= 2006 NACAC Under-23 Championships in Athletics – Results =

These are the full results of the 2006 NACAC Under-23 Championships in Athletics which took place between July 7 and July 9, 2006, at Estadio Olímpico Félix Sánchez in Santo Domingo, Dominican Republic.

== Men's results ==
=== 100 meters ===
Heats Wind: Heat 1: -1.3 m/s, Heat 2: -0.7 m/s, Heat 3: -0.1 m/s, Heat 4: 0.0 m/s

Rank	Heat	Name	Nationality	Time	Notes
1	4	Chris Hargrett	United States	10.42	Q
2	4	Richard Thompson	Trinidad and Tobago	10.43	Q
3	2	Derrick Atkins	Bahamas	10.51	Q
4	4	Andrew Hinds	Barbados	10.53	Q
5	1	Carlos Moore	United States	10.54	Q
6	3	Marcus Duncan	Trinidad and Tobago	10.54	Q
7	4	Jared Connaughton	Canada	10.59	q
8	3	Brian Mariano	Netherlands Antilles	10.61	Q
9	2	Daniel Bailey	Antigua and Barbuda	10.69	Q
10	3	Michael Herrera	Cuba	10.71	Q
11	2	Jesse Saunders	Jamaica	10.74	Q
12	3	Kawayne Fisher	Jamaica	10.74	q
13	4	Prince Kwidama	Netherlands Antilles	10.76	q
14	3	Adrian Durant	U.S. Virgin Islands	10.76	q
15	1	Adrian Griffith	Bahamas	10.82	Q
16	1	Darian Forbes	Turks and Caicos Islands	10.88	Q
17	4	Michael Henry	Montserrat	10.90	
18	1	Adam Rosenke	Canada	10.91	
19	2	Irving Guerrero	Dominican Republic	10.94	
20	3	Casnel Bushay	Saint Vincent and the Grenadines	10.95	
21	1	Geraldo González	Dominican Republic	10.99	
22	1	Jorge Arturo Alonso	Mexico	11.01	
23	1	Jeffrey Vélez	Puerto Rico	11.02	
24	2	Courtney Bascombe	Saint Vincent and the Grenadines	11.08	
25	2	Jorge Jiménez	Costa Rica	11.18	
26	3	Khalid Brooks	Anguilla	11.19	
27	2	Byron Frost	Belize	11.34	
28	1	Jermaine Williams	Belize	11.44	

Semifinals Wind: Semifinal 1: 0.0 m/s, Semifinal 2: +0.7 m/s

Rank	Heat	Name	Nationality	Time	Notes
1	2	Derrick Atkins	Bahamas	10.14	Q
2	2	Carlos Moore	United States	10.26	Q
3	1	Chris Hargrett	United States	10.28	Q
4	2	Marcus Duncan	Trinidad and Tobago	10.45	Q
5	1	Richard Thompson	Trinidad and Tobago	10.46	Q
6	1	Jared Connaughton	Canada	10.54	Q
7	2	Daniel Bailey	Antigua and Barbuda	10.55	q
8	1	Andrew Hinds	Barbados	10.57	q
9	1	Brian Mariano	Netherlands Antilles	10.58	
10	2	Jesse Saunders	Jamaica	10.59	
11	1	Adrian Griffith	Bahamas	10.63	
12	2	Michael Herrera	Cuba	10.66	
13	1	Darian Forbes	Turks and Caicos Islands	10.66	
14	1	Kawayne Fisher	Jamaica	10.70	
15	2	Prince Kwidama	Netherlands Antilles	10.87	
16	2	Adrian Durant	U.S. Virgin Islands	10.91	

Final
Wind: +1.2 m/s

Rank	Name	Nationality	Time	Notes
1st place, gold medalist(s)	Derrick Atkins	Bahamas	10.15	
2nd place, silver medalist(s)	Carlos Moore	United States	10.23	
3rd place, bronze medalist(s)	Chris Hargrett	United States	10.26	
4	Marcus Duncan	Trinidad and Tobago	10.40	
5	Richard Thompson	Trinidad and Tobago	10.42	
6	Andrew Hinds	Barbados	10.56	
7	Daniel Bailey	Antigua and Barbuda	10.64	
8	Jared Connaughton	Canada	10.66	

=== 200 meters ===
Heats Wind: Heat 1: +1.3 m/s, Heat 2: +1.3 m/s, Heat 3: +1.0 m/s, Heat 4: +1.7 m/s

Rank	Heat	Name	Nationality	Time	Notes
1	1	Darian Forbes	Turks and Caicos Islands	21.05	Q
2	1	Derrick Atkins	Bahamas	21.16	Q
3	1	Michael Herrera	Cuba	21.21	Q
4	4	Jared Connaughton	Canada	21.22	Q
5	1	Otis McDaniel	United States	21.28	q
6	4	Félix Martínez	Puerto Rico	21.51	Q
7	4	Robert Morton	Saint Kitts and Nevis	21.54	Q
8	3	Michael Cooley	United States	21.55	Q
9	2	Marcus Duncan	Trinidad and Tobago	21.64	Q
10	3	Geraldo González	Dominican Republic	21.66	Q
11	2	Jorge Arturo Alonso	Mexico	21.71	Q
12	3	Justin McLennan	Canada	21.81	Q
13	2	Courtney Bascombe	Saint Vincent and the Grenadines	22.26	Q
14	4	Jorge Jiménez	Costa Rica	22.37	q
15	2	Jermaine Williams	Belize	22.38	q
15	4	Carlos Guzmán	Dominican Republic	22.38	q
17	1	Byron Frost	Belize	22.71	
18	3	Kerron Harrigan	Anguilla	23.50	
	4	Richard Thompson	Trinidad and Tobago	DQ	False start

Semifinals Wind: Semifinal 1: +1.1 m/s, Semifinal 2: +1.1 m/s

Rank	Heat	Name	Nationality	Time	Notes
1	2	Derrick Atkins	Bahamas	20.97	Q
2	2	Otis McDaniel	United States	21.10	Q
3	1	Jared Connaughton	Canada	21.14	Q
4	2	Darian Forbes	Turks and Caicos Islands	21.35	Q
5	1	Robert Morton	Saint Kitts and Nevis	21.53	Q
6	1	Michael Cooley	United States	21.59	Q
7	1	Félix Martínez	Puerto Rico	21.67	q
8	1	Justin McLennan	Canada	21.84	q
9	2	Jorge Arturo Alonso	Mexico	21.89	
10	1	Geraldo González	Dominican Republic	22.02	
11	2	Carlos Guzmán	Dominican Republic	22.33	
12	1	Jorge Jiménez	Costa Rica	22.70	
	2	Michael Herrera	Cuba	DNF	

Final
Wind: -0.1 m/s

Rank	Name	Nationality	Time	Notes
1st place, gold medalist(s)	Otis McDaniel	United States	20.61	
2nd place, silver medalist(s)	Derrick Atkins	Bahamas	20.69	
3rd place, bronze medalist(s)	Jared Connaughton	Canada	21.14	
4	Michael Cooley	United States	21.32	
5	Robert Morton	Saint Kitts and Nevis	21.41	
6	Darian Forbes	Turks and Caicos Islands	21.42	
7	Justin McLennan	Canada	21.65	
8	Félix Martínez	Puerto Rico	21.66	

=== 400 meters ===
Heats

Rank	Heat	Name	Nationality	Time	Notes
1	3	Ricardo Chambers	Jamaica	45.95	Q
2	3	Lionel Larry	United States	46.33	Q
3	3	Michael Mathieu	Bahamas	46.34	q
4	2	Williams Collazo	Cuba	46.58	Q
5	3	Yoel Tapia	Dominican Republic	46.68	q
6	1	Leford Green	Jamaica	46.73	Q
7	3	Roger Polydore	Dominica	46.99	
8	2	Andretti Bain	Bahamas	47.15	Q
9	1	David Neville	United States	47.24	Q
10	1	Gavin Smellie	Canada	47.45	
11	1	Félix Martínez	Puerto Rico	47.46	
12	2	Israel Robles	Dominican Republic	48.14	
13	3	Jamil James	Trinidad and Tobago	48.21	
14	1	Melville Rogers	Saint Kitts and Nevis	48.25	
15	2	David Darmunt	Trinidad and Tobago	48.31	
16	3	Jamil Jones	Barbados	48.62	
17	2	Edennuel Reyes	Puerto Rico	48.99	
18	1	Carl Morgan	Cayman Islands	49.11	
19	2	Charmant Ollivierre	Saint Vincent and the Grenadines	49.79	
20	2	Ira Thomson	Canada	49.82	
21	2	Shaquan Been	Turks and Caicos Islands	51.15	
22	1	Ackim Lewis	British Virgin Islands	52.44	

Final

Rank	Name	Nationality	Time	Notes
1st place, gold medalist(s)	Ricardo Chambers	Jamaica	45.09	
2nd place, silver medalist(s)	Lionel Larry	United States	45.38	
3rd place, bronze medalist(s)	Williams Collazo	Cuba	45.72	
4	Michael Mathieu	Bahamas	46.04	
5	Leford Green	Jamaica	46.16	
6	Andretti Bain	Bahamas	46.17	
7	Yoel Tapia	Dominican Republic	46.54	

=== 800 meters ===
Heats

Rank	Heat	Name	Nationality	Time	Notes
1	1	Erasmel Soriano	Cuba	1:52.78	Q
2	1	Duane Solomon	United States	1:52.89	Q
3	1	Adam Currie	Canada	1:53.32	Q
4	1	Carlos Contreras	Dominican Republic	1:53.81	q
5	1	Jenner Pelicó	Guatemala	1:54.57	q
6	2	Geoff Martinson	Canada	1:55.46	Q
7	2	Ryan Brown	United States	1:55.51	Q
8	2	Andre Drummond	Jamaica	1:55.60	Q
9	1	David Vargas	Costa Rica	1:55.88	
10	2	Fidencio Florián	Dominican Republic	1:56.71	
11	2	David Darmunt	Trinidad and Tobago	2:02.59	
12	2	Maury Surel Castillo	Cuba	2:12.31	

Final

Rank	Name	Nationality	Time	Notes
1st place, gold medalist(s)	Duane Solomon	United States	1:48.96	
2nd place, silver medalist(s)	Adam Currie	Canada	1:49.22	
3rd place, bronze medalist(s)	Geoff Martinson	Canada	1:50.11	
4	Andre Drummond	Jamaica	1:50.16	
5	Carlos Contreras	Dominican Republic	1:54.02	
6	Jenner Pelicó	Guatemala	1:54.47	
7	Ryan Brown	United States	1:59.07	
	Erasmel Soriano	Cuba	DNF	

=== 1500 meters ===
Final

Rank	Name	Nationality	Time	Notes
1st place, gold medalist(s)	Maury Surel Castillo	Cuba	3:47.52	
2nd place, silver medalist(s)	Leonel Manzano	United States	3:47.64	
3rd place, bronze medalist(s)	Raúl Neyra	Cuba	3:48.10	
4	Shane Stroup	United States	3:48.15	
5	Geoff Kerr	Canada	3:48.89	
6	Andrew Coates	Canada	3:51.65	
7	Ricardo Estremera	Puerto Rico	3:55.43	
8	Carlan Arthur	Trinidad and Tobago	3:59.59	
9	Carlos Contreras	Dominican Republic	3:59.60	
10	David Vargas	Costa Rica	4:05.97	
11	Jenner Pelicó	Guatemala	4:07.29	
12	David Colón	Puerto Rico	4:11.95	

=== 5000 meters ===
Final

Rank	Name	Nationality	Time	Notes
1st place, gold medalist(s)	Aaron Aguayo	United States	14:54.55	
2nd place, silver medalist(s)	Giliat Ghebray	United States	14:55.52	
3rd place, bronze medalist(s)	Mark Steeds	Canada	15:02.68	
4	Yovanni Adames	Dominican Republic	15:31.94	
5	Michael Salinas	Mexico	15:38.19	
6	Jairo Hernández	Dominican Republic	15:52.60	
7	Ricardo Estremera	Puerto Rico	16:10.28	
8	Domingo Álvarez	Guatemala	16:35.71	

=== 10,000 meters ===
Final

Rank	Name	Nationality	Time	Notes
1st place, gold medalist(s)	John Moore	United States	30:16.03	
2nd place, silver medalist(s)	Jhonatan Castañeda	Mexico	30:37.08	
3rd place, bronze medalist(s)	Joseph Campanelli	Canada	31:04.62	
4	Davis Jankowski	United States	31:07.17	
5	Adrian Lambert	Canada	32:15.98	
	Óscar Valdez	Dominican Republic	DNF	
	Francisco Vázquez	Dominican Republic	DQ	

=== 3000 meters steeplechase ===
Final

Rank	Name	Nationality	Time	Notes
1st place, gold medalist(s)	José Alberto Sánchez	Cuba	9:06.42	
2nd place, silver medalist(s)	Corey Nowitzke	United States	9:08.63	
3rd place, bronze medalist(s)	Ryan Warrenberg	United States	9:11.36	
4	James Poulin-Cadovius	Canada	9:15.10	
5	Yovanni Adames	Dominican Republic	9:22.26	
6	Noé Jurado	Mexico	9:28.66	
7	Ricardo Estremera	Puerto Rico	9:28.71	
8	Jairo Hernández	Dominican Republic	9:42.91	
9	David Colón	Puerto Rico	10:07.71	
10	Domingo Álvarez	Guatemala	10:15.27	

=== 110 meters hurdles ===
Heats Wind: Heat 1: +1.1 m/s, Heat 2: +1.4 m/s

Rank	Heat	Name	Nationality	Time	Notes
1	1	Dominic Berger	United States	13.61	Q
2	1	Mark Stewart	Canada	14.37	Q
3	1	Christopher Bethel	Bahamas	14.50	Q
4	2	Jason Richardson	United States	14.52	Q
5	2	Adalberto Amador	Puerto Rico	14.66	Q
6	2	Ronald Forbes	Cayman Islands	14.74	Q
7	2	Ronald Benneth	Honduras	14.75	q
8	2	Ricardo Barlus	Dominican Republic	14.94	q
9	2	Norhiher Marín	Mexico	14.95	
10	1	Luis Carlos Bonilla	Guatemala	15.50	
	1	Carlos Jorge	Dominican Republic	DNF	

Final
Wind: +1.1 m/s

Rank	Name	Nationality	Time	Notes
1st place, gold medalist(s)	Dominic Berger	United States	13.78	
2nd place, silver medalist(s)	Jason Richardson	United States	13.87	
3rd place, bronze medalist(s)	Adalberto Amador	Puerto Rico	14.37	
4	Christopher Bethel	Bahamas	14.39	
5	Mark Stewart	Canada	14.43	
6	Ronald Forbes	Cayman Islands	14.44	
7	Ronald Benneth	Honduras	14.61	
8	Ricardo Barlus	Dominican Republic	15.10	

=== 400 meters hurdles ===
Heats

Rank	Heat	Name	Nationality	Time	Notes
1	1	Kenneth Ferguson	United States	49.31	Q
2	1	Bryan Steele	Jamaica	49.49	Q
3	2	Ruben McCoy	United States	49.82	Q
4	2	Isa Phillips	Jamaica	49.92	Q
5	1	Yasser Lismet	Cuba	51.14	Q
6	1	Argenis Batista	Dominican Republic	52.55	q
7	2	Luis Constanzo	Dominican Republic	52.71	Q
8	1	Camilo Quevedo	Guatemala	52.79	q
9	2	Lorenzo Wickham	Barbados	53.52	
10	2	Allan Ayala	Guatemala	53.55	
11	2	Manuel García	Puerto Rico	54.35	
12	2	Kwesy Toney	Trinidad and Tobago	54.57	
13	1	Akido Noel	Grenada	56.19	

Final

Rank	Name	Nationality	Time	Notes
1st place, gold medalist(s)	Kenneth Ferguson	United States	48.80	
2nd place, silver medalist(s)	Ruben McCoy	United States	49.56	
3rd place, bronze medalist(s)	Isa Phillips	Jamaica	49.80	
4	Bryan Steele	Jamaica	50.04	
5	Yasser Lismet	Cuba	50.83	
6	Luis Constanzo	Dominican Republic	52.27	
7	Argenis Batista	Dominican Republic	52.69	
8	Camilo Quevedo	Guatemala	52.77	

=== High jump ===
Final

Rank	Name	Nationality	Result	Notes
1st place, gold medalist(s)	Keith Moffatt	United States	2.27m	
2nd place, silver medalist(s)	Donald Thomas	Bahamas	2.21m	
3rd place, bronze medalist(s)	Mike Mason	Canada	2.19m	
4	Mark Dillon	Canada	2.19m	
5	Dusty Jonas	United States	2.14m	
6	James Grayman	Antigua and Barbuda	2.11m	
7	Deon Brangman	Bermuda	2.11m	
8	Omar Wright	Cayman Islands	2.11m	
9	Eduardo Santos	Puerto Rico	2.08m	
10	Adolphus Jones	Saint Kitts and Nevis	2.05m	
11	Abdiel Ruíz	Puerto Rico	2.00m	
12	Pedro Piñeira	Mexico	2.00m	
13	Isaac Carrillo	Mexico	1.95m	
14	Juan Mateo	Dominican Republic	1.85m	

=== Pole vault ===
Final

Rank	Name	Nationality	Result	Notes
1st place, gold medalist(s)	Brad Gabauer	United States	5.51m	
2nd place, silver medalist(s)	Lázaro Borges	Cuba	5.25m	
3rd place, bronze medalist(s)	Jimmie Heath	United States	5.05m	
4	Jason Wurster	Canada	5.05m	
5	Natanael Semeis	Dominican Republic	4.50m	
	Jorge Reynoso	Dominican Republic	NH	
	Marcos Mira	El Salvador	NH	
	Erick Foley	Canada	NH	

=== Long jump ===
Final

Rank	Name	Nationality	Result	Notes
1st place, gold medalist(s)	Wilfredo Martínez	Cuba	8.03m (+0.1 m/s)	
2nd place, silver medalist(s)	Carlos Jorge	Dominican Republic	7.96m (+0.9 m/s)	
3rd place, bronze medalist(s)	Tyrone Smith	Bermuda	7.90m (+0.7 m/s)	
4	Wilbert Walker	Jamaica	7.65m (+1.2 m/s)	
5	Michael Morrison	United States	7.61m (+0.4 m/s)	
6	Reggie Lazenby	United States	7.55m (+0.2 m/s)	
7	Adrian Griffith	Bahamas	7.49m (+0.7 m/s)	
8	Carlos Morgan	Cayman Islands	7.46m (+1.0 m/s)	
9	Carl Morgan	Cayman Islands	7.15m (+0.6 m/s)	
10	Benjamin Warnock	Canada	6.76m (+0.9 m/s)	
11	Willah Gray	Turks and Caicos Islands	5.80m (+0.6 m/s)	
	Wade Huber	Canada	NM	
	Kenrick Braithwaite	Bahamas	NM	

=== Triple jump ===
Final

Rank	Name	Nationality	Result	Notes
1st place, gold medalist(s)	Osniel Tosca	Cuba	17.01m (+0.5 m/s)	
2nd place, silver medalist(s)	Wilbert Walker	Jamaica	16.18m (+1.0 m/s)	
3rd place, bronze medalist(s)	Mike Whitehead	United States	15.85m (+0.9 m/s)	
4	John Tremidara	United States	15.75m (+0.3 m/s)	
5	Ayata Joseph	Antigua and Barbuda	15.45m (+0.8 m/s)	
6	Jamal Cumberbatch	Barbados	14.93m (+1.1 m/s)	
7	Ahmad Rolle	Bahamas	14.25m (+1.0 m/s)	
8	Maxwell Álvarez	Guatemala	14.18m (+0.0 m/s)	
9	Olbert Lara	Dominican Republic	14.12m (+0.7 m/s)	
10	Luis Cherry	Dominican Republic	13.66m (+0.6 m/s)	

=== Shot put ===
Final

Rank	Name	Nationality	Result	Notes
1st place, gold medalist(s)	Garrett Johnson	United States	20.64m	
2nd place, silver medalist(s)	Russell Winger	United States	19.35m	
3rd place, bronze medalist(s)	Reynaldo Proenza	Cuba	18.41m	
4	Kyle Helf	Canada	17.71m	
5	Walt Williams	Grenada	15.49m	

=== Discus throw ===
Final

Rank	Name	Nationality	Result	Notes
1st place, gold medalist(s)	Adam Kuehl	United States	59.04m	
2nd place, silver medalist(s)	Rashaud Scott	United States	53.36m	
3rd place, bronze medalist(s)	Adonson Shallow	Saint Vincent and the Grenadines	50.19m	
4	Jesús Sánchez Villa	Mexico	50.03m	
5	Walt Williams	Grenada	48.75m	
6	Michael Letterlough	Cayman Islands	44.30m	
7	Ramón Cotes	Dominican Republic	40.60m	
8	Kyle Francis	British Virgin Islands	40.14m	
9	Pablo Mercedes	Dominican Republic	35.68m	

=== Hammer throw ===
Final

Rank	Name	Nationality	Result	Notes
1st place, gold medalist(s)	Nick Owens	United States	67.87m	
2nd place, silver medalist(s)	Jake Dunkleberger	United States	66.91m	
3rd place, bronze medalist(s)	Roberto Janet	Cuba	66.28m	
4	Santiago de Jesús Loera	Mexico	60.95m	
5	Kyle Helf	Canada	56.06m	
6	Sean Steacy	Canada	55.99m	
7	David Valdés	Mexico	55.06m	
8	Diego Berríos	Guatemala	53.43m	
9	Roberto Sawyers	Costa Rica	50.34m	
10	Jormy Rodríguez	Puerto Rico	49.86m	
11	Michael Letterlough	Cayman Islands	49.81m	
12	Evangelisto Fermín	Dominican Republic	46.67m	
13	José Núñez	Dominican Republic	42.60m	

=== Javelin throw ===
Final

Rank	Name	Nationality	Result	Notes
1st place, gold medalist(s)	Eric Brown	United States	68.79m	
2nd place, silver medalist(s)	Andrew Vogelsberg	United States	66.69m	
3rd place, bronze medalist(s)	Roberto Blanco	Mexico	64.57m	
4	Darwin García	Dominican Republic	64.36m	
5	Kenley Olivos	Nicaragua	63.58m	
6	Juan Castro	Dominican Republic	55.96m	
7	Julio Lojo	Puerto Rico	55.45m	
8	Andre Andrews	Trinidad and Tobago	53.41m	
9	Adonson Shallow	Saint Vincent and the Grenadines	52.53m	
10	Ramon Farrington	Bahamas	51.35m	
11	Carlos Morgan	Cayman Islands	44.21m	

=== Decathlon ===
Final

Rank	Name	Nationality	100m	LJ	SP	HJ	400m	110m H	DT	PV	JT	1500m	Points	Notes
1st place, gold medalist(s)	Chris Richardson	United States	11.35 (1.2); 784pts	7.50m (0.4); 935pts	13.46m 695pts	1.96m 767pts	51.51; 746pts	15.61 (0.8); 777pts	44.30m 752pts	4.00m 617pts	53.64m 643pts	5:05.80; 527pts	7243	
2nd place, silver medalist(s)	Brandon Hoskins	United States	10.84 (1.2); 897pts	6.66m (1.6); 734pts	13.70m 710pts	1.87m 687pts	49.03; 860pts	15.68 (0.8); 769pts	40.88m 682pts	4.20m 673pts	45.13m 517pts	5:00.44; 557pts	7086	
3rd place, bronze medalist(s)	Marcos Sánchez	Puerto Rico	11.15 (1.2); 827pts	6.39m (-0.1); 673pts	12.22m 620pts	1.87m 687pts	49.17; 853pts	15.89 (0.8); 745pts	39.61m 657pts	3.80m 562pts	50.52m 596pts	5:04.11; 536pts	6756	
4	Gamalier Semeis	Dominican Republic	11.42 (1.2); 769pts	6.28m (0.7); 648pts	12.25m 622pts	1.84m 661pts	54.60; 615pts	16.77 (0.8); 648pts	30.43m 473pts	3.40m 457pts	47.71m 555pts	5:03.39; 540pts	5988	
5	Joe Smith	Dominican Republic	11.51 (1.2); 750pts	5.01m (0.0); 384pts	10.36m 507pts	1.45m 352pts	56.28; 548pts	21.10 (0.8); 267pts	29.14m 448pts	2.60m 264pts	42.12m 473pts	5:08.22; 513pts	4506	

=== 20,000 meters walk ===
Final

Rank	Name	Nationality	Time	Notes
1st place, gold medalist(s)	Salvador Mira	El Salvador	1:31:42	
2nd place, silver medalist(s)	Alejandro Rojas	Mexico	1:32:01	
3rd place, bronze medalist(s)	Juan Guerrero	Mexico	1:33:27	
4	Walter Sandoval	El Salvador	1:37:50	
5	Zachary Pollinger	United States	1:41:17	
6	Patrick Stroupe	United States	1:43:02	
	Noel Santini	Puerto Rico	DNF	
	Wander Jose	Dominican Republic	DNF	
	Luis Gómez	Guatemala	DQ	

=== 4x100 meters relay ===
Final

Rank	Nation	Competitors	Time	Notes
1st place, gold medalist(s)	United States	Gary Jones; Greg Bolden; Chris Hargrett; Carlos Moore	39.38	
2nd place, silver medalist(s)	Bahamas	Adrian Griffith; Ravanno Ferguson; Derek Carey; Derrick Atkins	39.74	
3rd place, bronze medalist(s)	Trinidad and Tobago	Rondel Sorrillo; Marcus Duncan; Richard Thompson; Emmanuel Callander	39.98	
4	Canada	Adam Rosenke; Gavin Smellie; Justin McLennan; Jared Connaughton	40.32	
5	Puerto Rico	Jeffrey Vélez; Yavid Zackey; Roberto Rivera; Félix Martínez	40.49	
6	Netherlands Antilles	Kleford Britt; Prince Kwidama; Christopher Adamus; Brian Mariano	41.54	
	Dominican Republic	Irving Guerrero; Carlos Jorge; Geraldo González; Carlos Guzmán	DQ	Drop Baton

=== 4x400 meters relay ===
Final

Rank	Nation	Competitors	Time	Notes
1st place, gold medalist(s)	Jamaica	Huntley Thomas; Leford Green; Bryan Steele; Ricardo Chambers	3:03.86	
2nd place, silver medalist(s)	United States	Reggie Dardar; Kenneth Ferguson; Carey Lacour; Lionel Larry	3:05.10	
3rd place, bronze medalist(s)	Bahamas	Jamal Moss; Michael Mathieu; Oscar Green; Andretti Bain	3:06.95	
4	Puerto Rico	Edennuel Reyes; Manuel García; Félix Martínez; Fabián Martínez	3:12.98	
5	Dominican Republic	Israel Robles; Eddy Batista; Luis Constanzo; Yoel Tapia	3:14.10	
6	Canada	Benjamin Warnock; Adam Rosenke; Geoff Martinson; Ira Thomson	3:14.62	
7	Trinidad and Tobago	Jamil James; Quincy Roberts; Kwesy Toney; David Darmunt	3:16.75	

== Women's results ==
=== 100 meters ===
Heats Wind: Heat 1: +0.2 m/s, Heat 2: +0.1 m/s

Rank	Heat	Name	Nationality	Time	Notes
1	2	Carol Rodríguez	Puerto Rico	11.42	Q
2	1	Shalonda Solomon	United States	11.42	Q
3	2	Cleo Tyson	United States	11.45	Q
4	2	Nyoka Cole	Jamaica	11.66	Q
5	1	Rosemarie Whyte	Jamaica	11.69	Q
6	1	Celiangeli Morales	Puerto Rico	11.73	Q
7	1	Geneviève Thibault	Canada	11.77	q
8	2	Nelsy Delgado	Dominican Republic	12.05	q
9	1	Ruth Asencio	Dominican Republic	12.30	
10	2	Kaina Martinez	Belize	12.70	

Final
Wind: +1.0 m/s

Rank	Name	Nationality	Time	Notes
1st place, gold medalist(s)	Cleo Tyson	United States	11.25	
2nd place, silver medalist(s)	Shalonda Solomon	United States	11.30	
3rd place, bronze medalist(s)	Carol Rodríguez	Puerto Rico	11.40	
4	Nyoka Cole	Jamaica	11.57	
5	Geneviève Thibault	Canada	11.70	
6	Rosemarie Whyte	Jamaica	11.74	
7	Celiangeli Morales	Puerto Rico	12.03	
8	Nelsy Delgado	Dominican Republic	12.05	

=== 200 meters ===
Final
Wind: +0.5 m/s

Rank	Name	Nationality	Time	Notes
1st place, gold medalist(s)	Shalonda Solomon	United States	22.90	
2nd place, silver medalist(s)	Antonette Carter	United States	23.05	
3rd place, bronze medalist(s)	Carol Rodríguez	Puerto Rico	23.27	
4	Nelsy Delgado	Dominican Republic	24.67	
5	Jennifer Gutiérrez	Puerto Rico	24.99	
6	Kerry Barrow	Trinidad and Tobago	25.78	
7	Saira Fernández	Dominican Republic	25.92	
8	Kaina Martinez	Belize	26.59	

=== 400 meters ===
Heats

Rank	Heat	Name	Nationality	Time	Notes
1	2	Shana Cox	United States	52.34	Q
2	1	Natasha Hastings	United States	52.99	Q
3	1	Clora Williams	Jamaica	53.69	Q
4	2	Nathandra John	Saint Kitts and Nevis	54.23	Q
5	1	Kineke Alexander	Saint Vincent and the Grenadines	54.33	Q
6	1	Ginou Etienne	Haiti	54.64	q
7	2	Nallely Vela	Mexico	56.04	Q
8	1	Maribel Pie	Dominican Republic	56.72	q
9	1	Ana Martha Coutiño	Mexico	58.29	
10	2	Janelle Clarke	Trinidad and Tobago	58.70	
11	2	Joeisla Laureano	Puerto Rico	59.41	
	2	Venecia Senyois	Dominican Republic	DQ	

Final

Rank	Name	Nationality	Time	Notes
1st place, gold medalist(s)	Shana Cox	United States	51.15	
2nd place, silver medalist(s)	Natasha Hastings	United States	52.11	
3rd place, bronze medalist(s)	Clora Williams	Jamaica	52.40	
4	Kineke Alexander	Saint Vincent and the Grenadines	52.95	
5	Ginou Etienne	Haiti	53.64	
6	Nathandra John	Saint Kitts and Nevis	53.68	
7	Nallely Vela	Mexico	56.11	
8	Maribel Pie	Dominican Republic	56.31	

=== 800 meters ===
Heats

Rank	Heat	Name	Nationality	Time	Notes
1	2	Alysia Johnson	United States	2:09.52	Q
2	1	Leslie Treherne	United States	2:09.63	Q
3	1	Gabriela Medina	Mexico	2:10.84	Q
4	1	Yuneysi Santiusty	Cuba	2:11.04	Q
5	2	Megan Brown	Canada	2:11.22	Q
6	2	Sonny García	Dominican Republic	2:12.13	Q
7	2	Evamarie Guzmán	Puerto Rico	2:12.36	q
8	2	Irma Durán	Mexico	2:12.98	q
9	1	Nichelle Gibbs	U.S. Virgin Islands	2:14.62	
10	1	Raquel Barquero	Costa Rica	2:14.99	
11	1	Francia Green	Dominican Republic	2:15.37	
12	2	Wendy Zúñiga	Costa Rica	2:17.27	

Final

Rank	Name	Nationality	Time	Notes
1st place, gold medalist(s)	Alysia Johnson	United States	2:03.87	
2nd place, silver medalist(s)	Gabriela Medina	Mexico	2:05.02	
3rd place, bronze medalist(s)	Yuneysi Santiusty	Cuba	2:05.13	
4	Leslie Treherne	United States	2:05.74	
5	Megan Brown	Canada	2:08.85	
6	Sonny García	Dominican Republic	2:11.71	
7	Irma Durán	Mexico	2:12.04	
8	Evamarie Guzmán	Puerto Rico	2:12.81	

=== 1500 meters ===
Final

Rank	Name	Nationality	Time	Notes
1st place, gold medalist(s)	Shannon Rowbury	United States	4:20.57	
2nd place, silver medalist(s)	Yuneysi Santiusty	Cuba	4:21.94	
3rd place, bronze medalist(s)	Jacqueline Malette	Canada	4:24.33	
4	Megan Brown	Canada	4:24.41	
5	Amy Lia	United States	4:31.60	
6	Anayeli Navarro	Mexico	4:31.68	
7	María Guadalupe Estrada	Mexico	4:33.86	
8	Sonny García	Dominican Republic	4:36.77	
9	Raquel Barquero	Costa Rica	4:46.56	
10	Wendy Zúñiga	Costa Rica	4:50.48	
	Francia Green	Dominican Republic	DNF	

=== 5000 meters ===
Final

Rank	Name	Nationality	Time	Notes
1st place, gold medalist(s)	Yudileyvis Castillo	Cuba	16:22.39	
2nd place, silver medalist(s)	Desiraye Osburn	United States	16:22.61	
3rd place, bronze medalist(s)	Jacqueline Malette	Canada	16:45.49	
4	Laura Moulton	Canada	16:57.79	
5	Jenna Kingma	United States	17:07.54	
6	María Guadalupe Estrada	Mexico	17:20.41	
7	Anayeli Navarro	Mexico	17:30.73	
8	Leomaris Herrera	Dominican Republic	17:34.56	
9	Andreina de la Rosa	Dominican Republic	17:35.57	
10	Érika Méndez	Puerto Rico	17:42.44	

=== 10,000 meters ===
Final

Rank	Name	Nationality	Time	Notes
1st place, gold medalist(s)	Stephanie Rothstein	United States	37:57.94	
2nd place, silver medalist(s)	Shannon Elmer	Canada	38:42.87	
3rd place, bronze medalist(s)	Érika Méndez	Puerto Rico	39:21.60	
4	Yohanna Joseph	Dominican Republic	40:48.22	

=== 3000 meters steeplechase ===
Final

Rank	Name	Nationality	Time	Notes
1st place, gold medalist(s)	Anna Willard	United States	10:23.23	
2nd place, silver medalist(s)	Cassie King	United States	10:36.97	
3rd place, bronze medalist(s)	Bevin Kennelly	Canada	10:43.74	
4	Sandra López	Mexico	10:57.90	
5	Violeta Gómez	Mexico	11:26.17	
6	Yohanna Joseph	Dominican Republic	12:28.94	

=== 100 meters hurdles ===
Heats Wind: Heat 1: -0.2 m/s, Heat 2: 0.0 m/s

Rank	Heat	Name	Nationality	Time	Notes
1	2	Dawn Harper	United States	13.36	Q
2	1	Yenima Arencibia	Cuba	13.44	Q
3	2	Josanne Lucas	Trinidad and Tobago	13.60	Q
4	1	Ashley Lodree	United States	13.65	Q
5	2	Nickiesha Wilson	Jamaica	13.84	Q
6	2	Juana Castillo	Dominican Republic	13.99	q
7	1	Jeimy Bernárdez	Honduras	14.37	Q
8	2	Violeta Ávila	Mexico	14.46	q
9	1	Coralys Ortiz	Puerto Rico	15.11	
10	1	Angélica Perdomo	Dominican Republic	16.33	

Final
Wind: +0.4 m/s

Rank	Name	Nationality	Time	Notes
1st place, gold medalist(s)	Dawn Harper	United States	13.06	
2nd place, silver medalist(s)	Josanne Lucas	Trinidad and Tobago	13.26	
3rd place, bronze medalist(s)	Ashley Lodree	United States	13.31	
4	Yenima Arencibia	Cuba	13.35	
5	Nickiesha Wilson	Jamaica	13.64	
6	Jeimy Bernárdez	Honduras	14.21	
7	Violeta Ávila	Mexico	14.32	

=== 400 meters hurdles ===
Heats

Rank	Heat	Name	Nationality	Time	Notes
1	2	Josanne Lucas	Trinidad and Tobago	57.76	Q
2	1	Erin Crawford	United States	58.43	Q
3	2	Julianna Reed	United States	58.99	Q
4	1	Nickiesha Wilson	Jamaica	59.03	Q
5	1	Lauren Welch	Canada	1:00.48	Q
6	1	Dayianna Vázquez	Puerto Rico	1:01.53	q
7	2	Ennyd Díaz	Puerto Rico	1:04.11	Q
8	2	Anna Lovell	Barbados	1:05.22	q
	1	Mercedes Ocalina	Dominican Republic	DNF	

Final

Rank	Name	Nationality	Time	Notes
1st place, gold medalist(s)	Josanne Lucas	Trinidad and Tobago	55.99	
2nd place, silver medalist(s)	Nickiesha Wilson	Jamaica	56.77	
3rd place, bronze medalist(s)	Erin Crawford	United States	58.70	
4	Julianna Reed	United States	59.34	
5	Dayianna Vázquez	Puerto Rico	1:00.49	
6	Lauren Welch	Canada	1:00.74	
7	Ennyd Díaz	Puerto Rico	1:02.69	
8	Anna Lovell	Barbados	1:02.73	

=== High jump ===
Final

Rank	Name	Nationality	Result	Notes
1st place, gold medalist(s)	Levern Spencer	Saint Lucia	1.81m	
2nd place, silver medalist(s)	Fabiola Ayala	Mexico	1.78m	
3rd place, bronze medalist(s)	Natalie Sako	United States	1.78m	
4	Sarah Wilfred	United States	1.78m	
5	Wanda Hidalgo	Dominican Republic	1.70m	
	Sandra Ogando	Dominican Republic	NH	

=== Pole vault ===
Final

Rank	Name	Nationality	Result	Notes
1st place, gold medalist(s)	Maryoris Sánchez	Cuba	4.20m	
2nd place, silver medalist(s)	Jodi Unger	United States	3.90m	
3rd place, bronze medalist(s)	Adrianne Vangool	Canada	3.80m	
4	Rudyleidy Wilmore	Dominican Republic	3.15m	
	Sue Kupper	Canada	NH	
	Pamela Villagómez	Mexico	NH	
	Emily Enders	United States	NH	
	Candy Zayas	Dominican Republic	DQ	

=== Long jump ===
Final

Rank	Name	Nationality	Result	Notes
1st place, gold medalist(s)	Yudelkis Fernández	Cuba	6.60m (+1.0 m/s)	
2nd place, silver medalist(s)	Kierra Foster	United States	6.48m (+1.0 m/s)	
3rd place, bronze medalist(s)	Brenda Falude	United States	6.43m (+1.9 m/s)	
4	Tabia Charles	Canada	6.34m (+1.3 m/s)	
5	Rosemarie Whyte	Jamaica	5.96m (+0.5 m/s)	
6	Sheron Mark	Trinidad and Tobago	5.75m (+0.9 m/s)	
7	Silvienne Krosendijk	Aruba	5.66m (+1.3 m/s)	
8	Érika Rivera	Puerto Rico	5.62m (+0.0 m/s)	
9	Sandra Ogando	Dominican Republic	5.56m (+0.9 m/s)	
10	Claudia Lugo	Mexico	5.52m (+1.1 m/s)	
	Candy Zayas	Dominican Republic	DQ	

=== Triple jump ===
Final

Rank	Name	Nationality	Result	Notes
1st place, gold medalist(s)	Yarianna Martínez	Cuba	14.28m (+0.3 m/s)	
2nd place, silver medalist(s)	Erica McLain	United States	13.92m (+0.8 m/s)	
3rd place, bronze medalist(s)	Tabia Charles	Canada	13.62m (+0.8 m/s)	
4	Yvette Lewis	United States	13.30m (+0.8 m/s)	
5	Sheron Mark	Trinidad and Tobago	12.62m (+1.0 m/s)	
6	Claudia Lugo	Mexico	12.31m (-0.3 m/s)	
7	Seidre Forde	Barbados	12.10m (+1.0 m/s)	
	Sandra Ogando	Dominican Republic	NM	

=== Shot put ===
Final

Rank	Name	Nationality	Result	Notes
1st place, gold medalist(s)	Amarachi Ukabam	United States	16.82m	
2nd place, silver medalist(s)	Michelle Carter	United States	16.74m	
3rd place, bronze medalist(s)	Sultana Frizell	Canada	15.18m	
4	Yaniuvis López	Cuba	15.09m	
5	Zara Northover	Jamaica	14.90m	
6	Shernelle Nicholls	Barbados	13.93m	
7	Joeanne Jadote	Haiti	12.89m	
8	Yaniris Sánchez	Dominican Republic	11.02m	
9	Elizabeth del Carmen	Dominican Republic	10.43m	

=== Discus throw ===
Final

Rank	Name	Nationality	Result	Notes
1st place, gold medalist(s)	Amarachi Ukabam	United States	53.45m	
2nd place, silver medalist(s)	Novelle Murray	Canada	51.26m	
3rd place, bronze medalist(s)	Kate Hutchinson	United States	50.09m	
4	Keisha Walkes	Barbados	49.11m	
5	Chantal Spies	Canada	44.73m	
6	Shernelle Nicholls	Barbados	43.74m	
7	Norimar Llanos	Puerto Rico	40.38m	
8	Joeanne Jadote	Haiti	40.07m	
9	Yahaira de la Cruz	Dominican Republic	38.55m	
	Odra Peguero	Dominican Republic	NM	
	Lizandra Rodríguez	Cuba	52.73m	^{†}

^{†}: Lizandra Rodríguez is listed 2nd in the result lists. However, she does not appear as medallist in Athletics Weekly. She might have been disqualified. Further details could not be retrieved.

=== Hammer throw ===
Final

Rank	Name	Nationality	Result	Notes
1st place, gold medalist(s)	Brittany Riley	United States	66.30m	
2nd place, silver medalist(s)	Arasay Thondike	Cuba	66.28m	
3rd place, bronze medalist(s)	Britney Henry	United States	65.41m	
4	Sultana Frizell	Canada	60.61m	
5	Marie-Eve Boiselle	Canada	55.04m	
6	Walkiria Rivera	Puerto Rico	51.94m	
7	Reyna Campoy	Mexico	49.88m	
8	Norimar Llanos	Puerto Rico	46.05m	
	Josefina Núñez	Dominican Republic	NM	
	Joeanne Jadote	Haiti	NM	
	María Cruz	Dominican Republic	NM	

=== Javelin throw ===
Final

Rank	Name	Nationality	Result	Notes
1st place, gold medalist(s)	Dana Pounds	United States	55.24m	
2nd place, silver medalist(s)	Krista Woodward	Canada	50.63m	
3rd place, bronze medalist(s)	Dayamit Delgado	Cuba	50.17m	
4	Emma-Gene Evans	Saint Lucia	49.72m	
5	Dalila Rugama	Nicaragua	49.31m	
6	Gleni Florián	Dominican Republic	42.46m	
7	Kara Patterson	United States	41.76m	
8	Coralys Ortiz	Puerto Rico	41.72m	
9	Olga Cabral	Dominican Republic	31.32m	

=== Heptathlon ===
Final

Rank	Name	Nationality	100m H	HJ	SP	200m	LJ	JT	800m	Points	Notes
1st place, gold medalist(s)	Gretchen Quintana	Cuba	13.60 (1.2); 1036pts	1.71m 867pts	11.99m 660pts	24.27 (0.8); 955pts	6.10m (-0.6); 880pts	33.37m 541pts	2:16.58; 871pts	5810	
2nd place, silver medalist(s)	Juana Castillo	Dominican Republic	13.80 (0.9); 1007pts	1.71m 867pts	13.36m 751pts	24.87 (0.8); 899pts	5.61m (-1.4); 732pts	40.95m 686pts	2:19.93; 824pts	5766	
3rd place, bronze medalist(s)	Yasmiany Pedroso	Cuba	13.90 (0.9); 993pts	1.71m 867pts	13.74m 777pts	25.73 (0.5); 821pts	5.71m (-0.6); 762pts	38.07m 630pts	2:27.88; 720pts	5570	
4	Jacquelyn Johnson	United States	13.60 (0.9); 1036pts	1.74m 903pts	11.58m 633pts	25.18 (0.8); 870pts	5.24m (-0.8); 626pts	40.18m 671pts	2:29.64; 697pts	5436	
5	Tracy Partain	United States	13.60 (1.2); 1036pts	1.71m 867pts	11.32m 616pts	25.22 (0.5); 867pts	5.52m (-1.8); 706pts	35.75m 586pts	2:28.77; 708pts	5386	
6	María Gabriela Carillo	El Salvador	14.70 (0.9); 882pts	1.68m 830pts	9.08m 469pts	26.93 (0.5); 718pts	5.59m (-0.6); 726pts	34.64m 565pts	2:29.07; 705pts	4895	
7	Cloe Hewitt	Canada	15.20 (1.2); 815pts	1.44m 555pts	10.58m 567pts	25.82 (0.5); 813pts	5.15m (-1.0); 601pts	35.63m 584pts	2:30.06; 692pts	4627	
8	Cuquie Melville	Trinidad and Tobago	14.70 (1.2); 882pts	1.59m 724pts	9.49m 496pts	26.73 (0.5); 734pts	4.67m (-1.0); 472pts	29.33m 464pts	2:24.89; 758pts	4530	
9	Adelle Johns	Canada	14.90 (0.9); 855pts	1.62m 759pts	8.80m 451pts	27.80 (0.8); 647pts	5.15m (-1.3); 601pts	26.12m 403pts	2:42.38; 546pts	4262	
10	Miriam Lizarraga	Mexico	15.90 (1.2); 727pts	1.56m 689pts	9.92m 524pts	28.01 (0.5); 630pts	4.85m (-0.7); 519pts	30.61m 488pts	2:30.85; 682pts	4259	
11	Natoya Baird	Trinidad and Tobago	15.60 (0.9); 764pts	1.62m 759pts	10.23m 545pts	28.17 (0.8); 617pts	4.72m (-1.5); 485pts	27.27m 425pts	2:58.03; 384pts	3979	
12	Marilyn Núñez	Dominican Republic	19.10 (1.2); 381pts	1.38m 491pts	9.03m 466pts	28.97 (0.5); 556pts	4.37m (-1.7); 396pts	30.41m 484pts	2:52.35; 439pts	3213	
	Kytzzia Vázquez	Mexico	15.70 (0.9); 751pts	1.50m 621pts	9.66m 507pts	DNS; 0pts	DNS; 0pts	DNS; 0pts	DNS; 0pts	DNF	

=== 10,000 meters walk ===
Final

Rank	Name	Nationality	Time	Notes
1st place, gold medalist(s)	Verónica Colindres	El Salvador	50:29	
2nd place, silver medalist(s)	Leisy Rodríguez	Cuba	50:51	
3rd place, bronze medalist(s)	Tatiana González	Mexico	51:06	
4	Rachel Lavallée	Canada	51:53	
5	Maria Michta	United States	52:26	
6	Tania Anchondo	Mexico	53:36	
7	Yolanda Quezada	Dominican Republic	56:51	
8	Lauren Davis	United States	1:04:26	

=== 4x100 meters relay ===
Final

Rank	Nation	Competitors	Time	Notes
1st place, gold medalist(s)	United States	Brooklyn Morris; Cleo Tyson; Shareese Woods; Shalonda Solomon	43.53	
2nd place, silver medalist(s)	Puerto Rico	Ericka Navas; Celiangeli Morales; Jennifer Gutiérrez; Érika Rivera	46.60	
	Dominican Republic	Nelsy Delgado; Perla Massiel; Saira Fernández; Ruth Asencio	DQ	Exchange zone violation

=== 4x400 meters relay ===
Final

Rank	Nation	Competitors	Time	Notes
1st place, gold medalist(s)	United States	Ashley Kidd; Natasha Hastings; Deonna Lawrence; Shana Cox	3:29.05	
2nd place, silver medalist(s)	Mexico	Ana Martha Coutiño; Nallely Vela; Irma Durán; Gabriela Medina	3:41.66	
3rd place, bronze medalist(s)	Trinidad and Tobago	Kerry Barrow; Josanne Lucas; Abagail David; Janelle Clarke	3:44.23	
4	Dominican Republic	Saira Fernández; Ruth Asencio; Nelsy Delgado; Perla Massiel	3:49.85	
5	Puerto Rico	Joeisla Laureano; Dayianna Vázquez; Ennyd Díaz; Érika Rivera	3:53.46	
6	Canada	Lauren Welch; Bevin Kennelly; Jacqueline Malette; Megan Brown	3:59.93	
