= 2005 Central American and Caribbean Championships in Athletics – Results =

These are the official results of the 2005 Central American and Caribbean Championships in Athletics which took place on July 8–11, 2005 in Nassau, Bahamas.

== Men's results ==
=== 100 meters ===
Heats – July 9
Wind:
Heat 1: +2.3 m/s, Heat 2: -0.2 m/s, Heat 3: +0.3 m/s, Heat 4: 0.0 m/s, Heat 5: -0.4 m/s

Rank	Heat	Name	Nationality	Time	Notes
1	4	Henry Vizcaíno	Cuba	10.46	Q
1	5	Marc Burns	Trinidad and Tobago	10.46	Q
3	4	Churandy Martina	Netherlands Antilles	10.47	Q
4	2	Daniel Bailey	Antigua and Barbuda	10.48	Q
5	3	Darrel Brown	Trinidad and Tobago	10.49	Q
6	2	Lerone Clarke	Jamaica	10.51	Q
7	1	Derrick Atkins	Bahamas	10.55	Q
8	5	Jorge Richardson	Puerto Rico	10.62	Q
9	3	Juan Sainfleur	Dominican Republic	10.63	Q
10	3	Kurt Watson	Jamaica	10.64	q
11	3	Jamial Rolle	Bahamas	10.66	q
12	4	Adrian Durant	United States Virgin Islands	10.67	q
13	1	José Ángel César	Cuba	10.69	Q
13	5	Xavier James	Bermuda	10.69	q
15	1	Brian Mariano	Netherlands Antilles	10.71	q
16	1	Jamal Simmons	Barbados	10.74	q
17	5	Stephen Johnson	Cayman Islands	10.75	
18	1	Abassy Ralph	Saint Vincent and the Grenadines	10.78	
18	5	Dion Crabbe	British Virgin Islands	10.78	
20	3	Yavid Zackey	Puerto Rico	10.80	
21	2	Jayson Jones	Belize	10.82	
22	2	Wladimir Afriani	Haiti	10.91	
23	5	Jorge Arturo Alonso	Mexico	10.94	
24	3	Julio Felix	United States Virgin Islands	10.95	
25	4	Ramon Gittens	Barbados	10.98	
26	3	Darian Forbes	Turks and Caicos Islands	11.08	
27	4	Michael Henry	Montserrat	11.10	
28	1	Khalid Brooks	Anguilla	11.19	
29	4	Carbiniere Whyte	Anguilla	11.36	
30	4	Stephane Rabel	Haiti	11.38	
31	2	Odingo Gordon	Montserrat	11.65	

Semi-finals – July 9
Wind:
Heat 1: +0.5 m/s, Heat 2: -0.4 m/s

Rank	Heat	Name	Nationality	Time	Notes
1	1	Darrel Brown	Trinidad and Tobago	10.16	Q
2	2	Marc Burns	Trinidad and Tobago	10.17	Q
3	1	Churandy Martina	Netherlands Antilles	10.23	Q
4	1	Henry Vizcaíno	Cuba	10.29	Q
5	1	Daniel Bailey	Antigua and Barbuda	10.39	q
5	2	Derrick Atkins	Bahamas	10.39	Q
7	2	Lerone Clarke	Jamaica	10.47	Q
8	1	Kurt Watson	Jamaica	10.51	q
9	1	Jamial Rolle	Bahamas	10.53	
10	2	Juan Sainfleur	Dominican Republic	10.54	
11	2	Jorge Richardson	Puerto Rico	10.58	
12	2	Adrian Durant	United States Virgin Islands	10.59	
13	1	Jamal Simmons	Barbados	10.69	
14	2	José Ángel César	Cuba	10.78	
15	2	Brian Mariano	Netherlands Antilles	10.85	
	2	Xavier James	Bermuda	DQ	FS

Final – July 9
Wind: +1.9 m/s

Rank	Name	Nationality	Time	Notes
1st place, gold medalist(s)	Darrel Brown	Trinidad and Tobago	10.02	CR
2nd place, silver medalist(s)	Marc Burns	Trinidad and Tobago	10.02	CR
3rd place, bronze medalist(s)	Churandy Martina	Netherlands Antilles	10.10	NR
4	Henry Vizcaíno	Cuba	10.20	
5	Derrick Atkins	Bahamas	10.21	
6	Lerone Clarke	Jamaica	10.24	
7	Kurt Watson	Jamaica	10.54	
	Daniel Bailey	Antigua and Barbuda	DNS	

=== 200 meters ===
Heats – July 10
Wind:
Heat 1: +0.5 m/s, Heat 2: +0.8 m/s, Heat 3: +1.1 m/s, Heat 4: -0.4 m/s, Heat 5: +3.0 m/s

Rank	Heat	Name	Nationality	Time	Notes
1	1	Yunier Pérez	Cuba	NT	q
1	1	Jamal Simmons	Barbados	NT	q
1	1	Stephen Johnson	Cayman Islands	NT	q
1	1	Larry Inanga	Saint Kitts and Nevis	NT	q
1	1	Abassy Ralph	Saint Vincent and the Grenadines	NT	
1	1	Jean-Yves Benoit	Haiti	NT	
	1	Daniel Bailey	Antigua and Barbuda	DNS	
	1	Adrian Durant	United States Virgin Islands	DNS	
1	2	Julien Raeburn	Trinidad and Tobago	20.82	Q
2	2	DeWayne Barrett	Jamaica	20.88	Q
3	2	Michael Herrera	Cuba	20.89	q
4	2	Jorge Richardson	Puerto Rico	20.99	q
5	2	Keita Cline	British Virgin Islands	21.48	
6	2	Odingo Gordon	Montserrat	23.44	
	2	Alex Navas	Honduras	DNS	
	2	Stephane Rabel	Haiti	DNS	
1	3	Dominic Demeritte	Bahamas	20.84	Q
2	3	Churandy Martina	Netherlands Antilles	20.95	Q
3	3	Dion Crabbe	British Virgin Islands	21.21	q
4	3	Félix Martínez	Puerto Rico	21.27	q
5	3	Jayson Jones	Belize	21.30	q
6	3	Darian Forbes	Turks and Caicos Islands	21.49	NR
7	3	Carbiniere Whyte	Anguilla	22.86	
1	4	Usain Bolt	Jamaica	21.00	Q
2	4	Derrick Atkins	Bahamas	21.73	Q
3	4	Michael Henry	Montserrat	22.09	
4	4	Khalid Brooks	Anguilla	22.23	
5	4	Mario Trillo	Mexico	22.25	
6	4	Delano Fulford	Turks and Caicos Islands	22.42	
	4	Rolando Palacios	Honduras	DNS	
	4	Julio Felix	United States Virgin Islands	DNS	
1	5	Aaron Armstrong	Trinidad and Tobago	20.82	Q
2	5	Obadele Thompson	Barbados	20.84	Q
3	5	Jairo Duzant	Netherlands Antilles	21.08	q
4	5	Delwayne Delaney	Saint Kitts and Nevis	21.14	q
5	5	Jorge Arturo Alonso	Mexico	21.41	q
6	5	Xavier James	Bermuda	21.66	
7	5	Robert Ibeh	Cayman Islands	21.68	
	5	Casnel Busnay	Saint Vincent and the Grenadines	DNS	

Semi-finals – July 10
Wind:
Heat 1: +0.3 m/s, Heat 2: +2.8 m/s, Heat 3: +1.3 m/s

Rank	Heat	Name	Nationality	Time	Notes
1	3	Dominic Demeritte	Bahamas	20.54	Q
2	2	Julien Raeburn	Trinidad and Tobago	20.56	Q
3	1	Aaron Armstrong	Trinidad and Tobago	20.67	Q
4	1	Usain Bolt	Jamaica	20.69	Q
5	2	Obadele Thompson	Barbados	20.73	Q
6	3	DeWayne Barrett	Jamaica	20.75	Q
7	3	Michael Herrera	Cuba	21.04	q
8	1	Churandy Martina	Netherlands Antilles	21.12	q
9	1	Yunier Pérez	Cuba	21.13	
10	3	Delwayne Delaney	Saint Kitts and Nevis	21.19	
11	1	Jorge Richardson	Puerto Rico	21.22	
12	1	Dion Crabbe	British Virgin Islands	21.23	
13	3	Jayson Jones	Belize	21.41	
14	2	Jamal Simmons	Barbados	21.45	
15	3	Stephen Johnson	Cayman Islands	21.50	
16	1	Larry Inanga	Saint Kitts and Nevis	21.57	
17	3	Jorge Arturo Alonso	Mexico	21.99	
	2	Jairo Duzant	Netherlands Antilles	DQ	FS
	2	Derrick Atkins	Bahamas	DQ	FS
	2	Félix Martínez	Puerto Rico	DNS	

Final – July 11
Wind: +1.9 m/s

Rank	Name	Nationality	Time	Notes
1st place, gold medalist(s)	Usain Bolt	Jamaica	20.03	CR
2nd place, silver medalist(s)	Aaron Armstrong	Trinidad and Tobago	20.35	
3rd place, bronze medalist(s)	Dominic Demeritte	Bahamas	20.47	
4	Obadele Thompson	Barbados	20.53	
5	Julien Raeburn	Trinidad and Tobago	20.80	
6	Michael Herrera	Cuba	20.91	
7	DeWayne Barrett	Jamaica	21.00	
	Churandy Martina	Netherlands Antilles	DNS	

=== 400 meters ===
Heats – July 9

Rank	Heat	Name	Nationality	Time	Notes
1	1	Glauder Garzón	Cuba	45.88	Q
2	1	Damion Barry	Trinidad and Tobago	45.94	Q
3	3	Ato Stephens	Trinidad and Tobago	46.10	Q
4	1	Andrae Williams	Bahamas	46.20	q
5	3	Lansford Spence	Jamaica	46.36	Q
6	3	Arismendy Peguero	Dominican Republic	46.72	q
7	2	Chris Brown	Bahamas	46.94	Q
8	3	Chris Lloyd	Dominica	47.20	
9	2	Williams Collazo	Cuba	47.25	Q
10	1	Geronimo Goeloe	Netherlands Antilles	47.26	
11	1	Larry Inanga	Saint Kitts and Nevis	47.40	
12	2	Antonio Side	Dominican Republic	47.60	
13	1	Félix Martínez	Puerto Rico	48.22	
14	3	Melville Rogers	Saint Kitts and Nevis	48.26	
15	2	Kevin Fahie	British Virgin Islands	48.65	
16	1	Roger Polydore	Dominica	49.00	
17	2	Mario Trillo	Mexico	49.91	
	3	Wilan Louis	Barbados	DNF	

Final – July 10

Rank	Name	Nationality	Time	Notes
1st place, gold medalist(s)	Lansford Spence	Jamaica	45.29	
2nd place, silver medalist(s)	Ato Stephens	Trinidad and Tobago	45.46	
3rd place, bronze medalist(s)	Chris Brown	Bahamas	45.57	
4	Damion Barry	Trinidad and Tobago	45.60	
5	Glauder Garzón	Cuba	46.14	
6	Arismendy Peguero	Dominican Republic	46.44	
7	Andrae Williams	Bahamas	46.49	
8	Williams Collazo	Cuba	46.58	

=== 800 meters ===
Heats – July 10

Rank	Heat	Name	Nationality	Time	Notes
1	1	Sherridan Kirk	Trinidad and Tobago	1:51.53	Q
2	1	Yeimer López	Cuba	1:51.54	Q
3	1	Aldwyn Sappleton	Jamaica	1:51.95	Q
4	2	Moise Joseph	Haiti	1:51.97	Q
5	1	Amado Amador	Mexico	1:52.20	q
6	2	Heleodoro Navarro	Mexico	1:52.56	Q
7	2	Ricardo Cunningham	Jamaica	1:53.36	Q
8	1	Alexis Roberts	Bahamas	1:53.69	q (1:53.685)
9	2	José Vargas	Puerto Rico	1:53.69	(1:53.687)
10	2	Ramon Miller	Bahamas	1:55.90	
11	2	Michael Donawa	Bermuda	1:56.60	
12	2	Francis Jiménez	El Salvador	1:58.37	
13	1	Ludence Smith	British Virgin Islands	1:59.98	
	1	Thomas Watkins	Turks and Caicos Islands	DNF	

Final – July 11

Rank	Name	Nationality	Time	Notes
1st place, gold medalist(s)	Yeimer López	Cuba	1:47.64	
2nd place, silver medalist(s)	Sherridan Kirk	Trinidad and Tobago	1:48.31	
3rd place, bronze medalist(s)	Moise Joseph	Haiti	1:49.60	
4	Amado Amador	Mexico	1:49.68	
5	Ricardo Cunningham	Jamaica	1:50.89	
6	Heleodoro Navarro	Mexico	1:50.92	
7	Alexis Roberts	Bahamas	1:52.19	
8	Aldwyn Sappleton	Jamaica	1:53.00	

=== 1500 meters ===
July 10

Rank	Name	Nationality	Time	Notes
1st place, gold medalist(s)	Maury Surel Castillo	Cuba	3:47.89	
2nd place, silver medalist(s)	David Freeman	Puerto Rico	3:48.01	
3rd place, bronze medalist(s)	Luis Daniel Soto	Puerto Rico	3:52.60	
4	Salvador Miranda	Mexico	3:53.83	
5	Juan Odalis Almonte	Dominican Republic	3:54.31	
6	Raúl Neyra	Cuba	3:58.64	
7	O'Neil Williams	Bahamas	3:59.71	
8	Jason Williams	Bahamas	4:00.87	
9	Francis Jiménez	El Salvador	4:03.84	

=== 5000 meters ===
July 10

Rank	Name	Nationality	Time	Notes
1st place, gold medalist(s)	Juan Luis Barrios	Mexico	14:22.57	
2nd place, silver medalist(s)	Juan Carlos Romero	Mexico	14:36.18	
3rd place, bronze medalist(s)	Liván Luque	Cuba	14:38.02	
4	Henry Jaens	Cuba	14:39.99	
5	Alfredo Arévalo	Guatemala	14:42.58	
6	Elliot Mason	Antigua and Barbuda	16:24.36	
7	Jean-Robert Baptiste	Haiti	18:15.80	
	Valnet Gedeon	Haiti	DNF	

=== 10,000 meters ===
July 9

Rank	Name	Nationality	Time	Notes
1st place, gold medalist(s)	Aguelmis Rojas	Cuba	30:14.75	
2nd place, silver medalist(s)	Juan Carlos Romero	Mexico	30:41.87	
3rd place, bronze medalist(s)	Henry Jaens	Cuba	31:38.63	
4	Curtis Cox	Trinidad and Tobago	32:24.38	
5	Denzel Ramirez	Trinidad and Tobago	33:25.81	
6	Steeve Gabart	Haiti	33:56.12	

=== 110 meters hurdles ===
Heats – July 10
Wind:
Heat 1: +0.6 m/s, Heat 2: -0.7 m/s

Rank	Heat	Name	Nationality	Time	Notes
1	1	Yoel Hernández	Cuba	13.51	Q
2	2	Dayron Robles	Cuba	13.59	Q
3	1	Chris Pinnock	Jamaica	13.66	Q
4	1	Dudley Dorival	Haiti	13.67	Q
5	1	Alleyne Lett	Grenada	13.69	q
6	2	Enrique Llanos	Puerto Rico	13.86	Q
7	2	Decosma Wright	Jamaica	13.98	Q
8	1	Héctor Cotto	Puerto Rico	14.01	q
9	1	Sanchez Ross	Trinidad and Tobago	14.21	
10	2	Christopher Bethel	Bahamas	14.41	
11	2	Ronald Forbes	Cayman Islands	14.49	
12	1	Norhiher Marín	Mexico	14.75	

Final – July 10
Wind:
+2.6 m/s

Rank	Name	Nationality	Time	Notes
1st place, gold medalist(s)	Yoel Hernández	Cuba	13.32	
2nd place, silver medalist(s)	Dayron Robles	Cuba	13.41	
3rd place, bronze medalist(s)	Alleyne Lett	Grenada	13.49	
4	Dudley Dorival	Haiti	13.50	
5	Chris Pinnock	Jamaica	13.55	
6	Enrique Llanos	Puerto Rico	13.69	
7	Decosma Wright	Jamaica	13.81	
8	Héctor Cotto	Puerto Rico	14.05	

=== 400 meters hurdles ===
Heats – July 9

Rank	Heat	Name	Nationality	Time	Notes
1	1	Dean Griffiths	Jamaica	50.27	Q
2	2	Yacnier Luis	Cuba	50.49	Q
3	1	Sergio Hierrezuelo	Cuba	50.50	Q
4	2	Lueroy Colquhoun	Jamaica	50.69	Q
5	1	Javier Culson	Puerto Rico	50.71	Q
6	2	Douglas Lynes-Bell	Bahamas	51.79	Q
7	2	Sanchez Ross	Trinidad and Tobago	51.79	q
8	1	Ednol Rolle	Bahamas	52.38	q
9	1	Ryan King	Barbados	52.97	
	2	Miguel García	Dominican Republic	DNF	
	2	Ronald Forbes	Cayman Islands	DNF	

Final – July 9

Rank	Name	Nationality	Time	Notes
1st place, gold medalist(s)	Dean Griffiths	Jamaica	48.99	CR
2nd place, silver medalist(s)	Yacnier Luis	Cuba	49.12	
3rd place, bronze medalist(s)	Lueroy Colquhoun	Jamaica	49.23	
4	Sergio Hierrezuelo	Cuba	49.66	
5	Javier Culson	Puerto Rico	50.62	
6	Sanchez Ross	Trinidad and Tobago	51.32	
7	Douglas Lynes-Bell	Bahamas	51.66	
8	Ednol Rolle	Bahamas	52.70	

=== 3000 meters steeplechase ===
July 9

Rank	Name	Nationality	Time	Notes
1st place, gold medalist(s)	Alexander Greaux	Puerto Rico	8:56.15	
2nd place, silver medalist(s)	José Alberto Sánchez	Cuba	9:07.44	
3rd place, bronze medalist(s)	Salvador Miranda	Mexico	9:11.67	
4	O'Neil Williams	Bahamas	10:01.57	
5	Jason Williams	Bahamas	10:17.96	

=== 4 x 100 meters relay ===
Heats – July 10

Rank	Heat	Nation	Competitors	Time	Notes
1	1	Trinidad and Tobago	Kevon Pierre, Marc Burns, Jacey Harper, Darrel Brown	39.04	Q
2	2	Netherlands Antilles	Geronimo Goeloe, Charlton Raffaela, Jairo Duzant, Churandy Martina	39.40	Q
3	1	Bahamas	Jamial Rolle, Ryan Moseley, Troy McIntosh, Grafton Ifill	39.65	Q
4	2	Jamaica	Lerone Clarke, Kevin Stewart, Kurt Watson, Llewellyn Bredwood	39.76	Q
5	1	Cuba	José Ángel César, Michael Herrera, Carlos Patterson, Henry Vizcaíno	40.24	Q
6	2	Dominican Republic	Joel Báez, Danny García, Juan Sainfleur, Franklin Sánchez	40.42	Q
7	2	British Virgin Islands	Ralston Henry, Keita Cline, Kevin Fahie, Dion Crabbe	40.71	q, NR
8	1	Saint Kitts and Nevis	Irvin Browne, Melville Rogers, Larry Inanga, Delwayne Delaney	41.50	q
9	2	Turks and Caicos Islands	Ronald Parker, Darian Forbes, Delano Seymour, Delano Fulford	43.01	
	1	Haiti	Jean Oliver Ferry, Stephann Desulme, Stephane Rabel, Jonathan Molebranche	DNF	

Final – July 10

Rank	Nation	Competitors	Time	Notes
1st place, gold medalist(s)	Trinidad and Tobago	Aaron Armstrong, Marc Burns, Jacey Harper, Darrel Brown	38.47	CR, NR
2nd place, silver medalist(s)	Netherlands Antilles	Geronimo Goeloe, Charlton Raffaela, Jairo Duzant, Churandy Martina	38.92	NR
3rd place, bronze medalist(s)	Bahamas	Jamial Rolle, Dominic Demeritte, Grafton Ifill, Derrick Atkins	39.08	
4	Cuba	José Ángel César, Yoel Hernández, Michael Herrera, Henry Vizcaíno	39.40	
5	Jamaica	Lerone Clarke, Kurt Watson, Kevin Stewart, Llewellyn Bredwood	39.48	
	Dominican Republic	Joel Báez, Danny García, Juan Sainfleur, Raymundo Sido	DQ	R 170.14
	British Virgin Islands	Ralston Henry, Keita Cline, Kevin Fahie, Dion Crabbe	DNF	
	Saint Kitts and Nevis		DNS	

=== 4 x 400 meters relay ===
July 11

Rank	Nation	Competitors	Time	Notes
1st place, gold medalist(s)	Bahamas	Aaron Cleare, Andrae Williams, Nathaniel McKinney, Chris Brown	3:01.08	
2nd place, silver medalist(s)	Trinidad and Tobago	Ato Stephens, Renny Quow, Sherridan Kirk, Damion Barry	3:01.43	
3rd place, bronze medalist(s)	Cuba	Williams Collazo, Dayron Martínez, Glauder Garzón, Yeimer López	3:02.33	
4	Jamaica	Sékou Clarke, Marvin Essor, Lancford Davis, Lansford Spence	3:03.51	
5	Dominican Republic	Arismendy Peguero, Antonio Side, Danny García, Pedro Mejía	3:06.69	

=== 20,000 meters walk ===
July 9

Rank	Name	Nationality	Time	Notes
1st place, gold medalist(s)	Julio René Martínez	Guatemala	1:30:38.07	
2nd place, silver medalist(s)	Gabriel Ortiz	Mexico	1:32:46.32	
3rd place, bronze medalist(s)	Walter Sandoval	El Salvador	1:37:38.64	
4	Víctor Álvarez	Cuba	1:43:10.13	
	José Ramón Henríquez	Dominican Republic	DQ	

=== High jump ===
July 11

Rank	Name	Nationality	1.95	2.00	2.05	2.10	2.15	2.20	2.23	2.26	2.29	2.32	Result	Notes
1st place, gold medalist(s)	Víctor Moya	Cuba	–	–	–	–	o	o	–	xo	xxx		2.26	
2nd place, silver medalist(s)	Lisvany Pérez	Cuba	–	–	–	–	o	o	–	xxo	–	xx–	2.26	
3rd place, bronze medalist(s)	Gerardo Martínez	Mexico	–	–	o	o	o	o	o	xxx			2.23	
4	Trevor Barry	Bahamas	–	–	o	o	o	xxo	xxx				2.20	
5	Henderson Dottin	Barbados	–	–	–	o	xo	xxx					2.15	
6	James Grayman	Antigua and Barbuda	–	o	xxo	xo	xo	xxx					2.15	NR
7	Omar Wright	Cayman Islands	–	o	o	o	xxx						2.10	
8	Pedro Antonio Pinera	Mexico	o	o	xo	xo	xxx						2.10	
9	James Rolle	Bahamas	o	o	xo	xxx							2.05	
9	Deon Brangman	Bermuda	–	o	xo	xxx							2.05	

=== Pole vault ===
July 11

Rank	Name	Nationality	4.30	4.40	4.50	4.60	4.70	4.80	4.90	Result	Notes
1st place, gold medalist(s)	Lázaro Borges	Cuba	–	–	–	o	o	o	xxx	4.80	
2nd place, silver medalist(s)	Abiexer Vega	Puerto Rico	–	–	o	o	xo	o	xxx	4.80	
3rd place, bronze medalist(s)	Steven Marrero	Puerto Rico	–	o	–	xxx				4.40	
4	Kenny Moxey	Bahamas	xxo	xxx						4.30	
	Alberto Juantorena Jr.	Cuba	xxx							NM	
	Edwin Barrientos	Guatemala	–	xxx						NM	

=== Long jump ===
July 10

Rank	Name	Nationality	#1	#2	#3	#4	#5	#6	Result	Notes
1st place, gold medalist(s)	Leevan Sands	Bahamas	8.00w	7.94w	x	8.13	x	7.98	8.13	=CR
2nd place, silver medalist(s)	Osbourne Moxey	Bahamas	8.03w	7.61w	7.89w	7.84	7.88	7.68	8.03w	
3rd place, bronze medalist(s)	Ibrahim Camejo	Cuba	7.25w	7.68w	7.55w	7.87w	7.82w	7.88	7.88	
4	Wilfredo Martínez	Cuba	7.05w	x	7.56w	7.47w	x	x	7.56w	
5	Herbert McGregor	Jamaica	7.39w	7.56w	7.40w	7.42w	x	4.95	7.56w	
6	Allen Simms	Puerto Rico	x	7.15w	7.54w	7.34w	7.49w	x	7.54w	
7	Carlos Jorge	Dominican Republic	7.47w	7.42w	7.01w	x	7.01w	x	7.47w	
8	Maxwell Álvarez	Guatemala	7.19w	7.08w	x				7.19w	
9	Ralston Henry	British Virgin Islands	7.00w	6.86w	7.08w				7.08w	
10	Robert Ibeh	Cayman Islands	6.75w	6.75w	6.67w				6.75w	
11	Keita Cline	British Virgin Islands	x	4.24w	x				4.24w	

=== Triple jump ===
July 11

Rank	Name	Nationality	#1	#2	#3	#4	#5	#6	Result	Notes
1st place, gold medalist(s)	Yoandri Betanzos	Cuba	17.33w	16.66	16.97w	17.09w	x	w	17.33w	
2nd place, silver medalist(s)	Allen Simms	Puerto Rico	16.41w	16.92w	16.60w	16.65w	16.77	17.19w	17.19w	
3rd place, bronze medalist(s)	Leevan Sands	Bahamas	16.83	x	16.77w	16.60w	x	17.14w	17.14w	
4	Alexis Copello	Cuba	16.90w	17.09w	16.89w	x	15.90w	x	17.09w	
5	Randy Lewis	Grenada	16.83w	x	16.47w	x	16.59w	x	16.83w	
6	Wilbert Walker	Jamaica	15.91w	x	15.83w	15.64w	15.62w	16.03w	16.03w	
7	Antonio Saunders	Bahamas	15.46w	15.45w	15.87w	14.93w	14.35w	15.54w	15.87w	
8	Fabian Florant	Dominica	14.99w	15.17w	x	14.85w	–	–	15.17w	
9	Juan Carlos Nájera	Guatemala	x	13.92w	13.53w				13.92w	

=== Shot put ===
July 10

Rank	Name	Nationality	#1	#2	#3	#4	#5	#6	Result	Notes
1st place, gold medalist(s)	Dorian Scott	Jamaica	19.61	17.95	18.61	19.29	19.74	20.21	20.21	CR, NR
2nd place, silver medalist(s)	Alexis Paumier	Cuba	18.66	18.91	18.35	18.90	18.93	19.06	19.06	
3rd place, bronze medalist(s)	Yioser Toledo	Cuba	17.80	18.28	17.99	18.21	x	17.63	18.28	
4	Kimani Kirton	Jamaica	x	x	16.00	x	x	x	16.00	
5	Expedi Pena	Dominican Republic	14.26	14.49	14.84	15.40	14.58	x	15.40	
6	Reginald Sands	Bahamas	x	11.73	x	x	15.14	14.71	15.14	

=== Discus throw ===
July 9

Rank	Name	Nationality	#1	#2	#3	#4	#5	#6	Result	Notes
1st place, gold medalist(s)	Yunior Lastre	Cuba	54.41	x	57.05	60.10	x	x	60.10	
2nd place, silver medalist(s)	Lois Maikel Martínez	Cuba	56.00	55.13	57.64	x	x	59.35	59.35	
3rd place, bronze medalist(s)	Héctor Hurtado	Venezuela	51.29	50.21	50.90	52.00	51.75	55.05	55.05	
4	Maurice Smith	Jamaica	50.50	51.15	49.71	x	49.46	x	51.15	
5	Expedi Pena	Dominican Republic	4.22	42.86	47.96	x	47.77	45.49	47.96	
6	Alleyne Lett	Grenada	46.52	x	x	x	x	x	46.52	
7	Raúl Rivera	Guatemala	x	x	39.72	x	x	x	39.72	

=== Hammer throw ===
July 10

Rank	Name	Nationality	#1	#2	#3	#4	#5	#6	Result	Notes
1st place, gold medalist(s)	Yosvany Suárez	Cuba	68.97	x	x	69.47	67.09	x	69.47	
2nd place, silver medalist(s)	Erik Jiménez	Cuba	x	68.20	x	68.42	x	x	68.42	
3rd place, bronze medalist(s)	Santos Vega	Puerto Rico							64.53	
4	Raúl Rivera	Guatemala	x	x	58.19	61.77	62.82	x	62.82	
5	Santiago Helena	Dominican Republic	50.67	55.10	54.68	56.53	x	54.70	56.53	
6	Gabriel Wilkinson	Bermuda	51.94	51.06	x	x	x	x	51.94	NR

=== Javelin throw ===
July 9

Rank	Name	Nationality	#1	#2	#3	#4	#5	#6	Result	Notes
1st place, gold medalist(s)	Emeterio González	Cuba	71.45	76.44	x	x	x	76.09	76.44	
2nd place, silver medalist(s)	Yudel Moreno	Cuba	73.95	x	x	x	68.49	x	73.95	
3rd place, bronze medalist(s)	Justin Cummins	Barbados	59.32	x	61.92	x	x	x	61.92	
4	Ramon Farrington	Bahamas	x	x	57.57	59.47	56.24	61.66	61.66	
5	Henry Butler	Bahamas	52.11	47.54	50.43	51.12	51.81	x	52.11	

=== Decathlon ===
July 9–10

The highest mark recorded in each event is highlighted in yellow

Rank	Athlete	Nationality	100m	LJ	SP	HJ	400m	110m H	DT	PV	JT	1500m	Points	Notes
1st place, gold medalist(s)	Claston Bernard	Jamaica	10.89	7.13	13.50	2.12	49.94	14.55	47.44	4.30	54.15	4:45.97	7877	CR
2nd place, silver medalist(s)	Alberto Juantorena Jr.	Cuba	10.95	7.35	12.23	2.09	49.59	14.80	40.03	4.40	53.57	4:45.09	7672	
3rd place, bronze medalist(s)	Alexis Chivás	Cuba	11.16	7.24	14.75	1.94	53.28	14.80	50.83	4.00	61.89	4:54.85	7624	
4	Steven Marrero	Puerto Rico	11.34	6.82	11.99	1.91	49.66	15.85	41.13	4.70	54.11	4:34.38	7339	
5	Octavius Gillespie	Guatemala	11.62	6.91	13.76	2.00	52.84	15.42	39.50	4.50	22.70	5:11.95	6629	
	Alan Mitchell	Trinidad and Tobago	11.66	6.43	13.43	1.79	53.43	15.62	43.10	3.20	DNS	–	DNF	
	Adrian Griffith	Bahamas	11.17	7.07	10.58	1.91	52.19	16.63	DNS	–	–	–	DNF	
	Darwin Colón	Honduras	DNS	–	–	–	–	–	–	–	–	–	DNS	
	Maurice Smith	Jamaica	DNS	–	–	–	–	–	–	–	–	–	DNS	

== Women's results ==
=== 100 meters ===
Heats – July 9
Wind:
Heat 1: +0.1 m/s, Heat 2: +0.4 m/s, Heat 3: +3.2 m/s

Rank	Heat	Name	Nationality	Time	Notes
1	3	Tahesia Harrigan	British Virgin Islands	11.28	Q
2	3	Fana Ashby	Trinidad and Tobago	11.32	Q
3	3	LaVerne Jones-Ferrette	United States Virgin Islands	11.35	q
4	2	Chandra Sturrup	Bahamas	11.37	Q
4	3	Beverly McDonald	Jamaica	11.37	q
6	3	Virgil Hodge	Saint Kitts and Nevis	11.43	
7	1	Sheri-Ann Brooks	Jamaica	11.56	Q
8	1	Tamicka Clarke	Bahamas	11.68	Q
9	3	Misleidys Lazo	Cuba	11.69	
10	2	Valma Bass	United States Virgin Islands	11.81	Q
11	3	Libia Jackson	Dominican Republic	11.83	
12	1	Astrid Nassar	Mexico	11.89	
13	1	Tanika Liburd	Saint Kitts and Nevis	11.89	
14	2	Nelsy Delgado	Dominican Republic	11.98	
15	2	Carol Rodríguez	Puerto Rico	12.11	
16	2	Lian Lucas	Barbados	12.16	
17	1	Jade Bailey	Barbados	12.40	
18	1	Silvienne Krosendijk	Aruba	12.75	
19	2	Ayanna Hutchinson	Trinidad and Tobago	13.34	

Final – July 9
Wind:
+1.1 m/s

Rank	Name	Nationality	Time	Notes
1st place, gold medalist(s)	Chandra Sturrup	Bahamas	11.02	CR
2nd place, silver medalist(s)	Tahesia Harrigan	British Virgin Islands	11.29	NR
3rd place, bronze medalist(s)	Fana Ashby	Trinidad and Tobago	11.40	
4	LaVerne Jones-Ferrette	United States Virgin Islands	11.45	
5	Beverly McDonald	Jamaica	11.46	
6	Tamicka Clarke	Bahamas	11.50	
7	Sheri-Ann Brooks	Jamaica	11.52	
8	Valma Bass	United States Virgin Islands	11.81	

=== 200 meters ===
Heats – July 10
Wind:
Heat 1: +1.1 m/s, Heat 2: -0.2 m/s, Heat 3: +2.7 m/s

Rank	Heat	Name	Nationality	Time	Notes
1	1	Cydonie Mothersill	Cayman Islands	22.39	Q, NR
2	2	Christine Amertil	Bahamas	22.58	Q
3	3	Peta-Gaye Dowdie	Jamaica	22.87	Q
4	3	Virgil Hodge	Saint Kitts and Nevis	23.05	Q
5	1	Sheri-Ann Brooks	Jamaica	23.17	Q
6	1	LaVerne Jones-Ferrette	United States Virgin Islands	23.23	q
7	3	Wilmary Álvarez	Venezuela	23.26	q
8	2	Roxana Díaz	Cuba	23.32	Q
9	3	Philippa Arnette-Willie	Bahamas	23.63	
10	2	Ruth Grajeda	Mexico	23.70	
11	2	Valma Bass	United States Virgin Islands	23.89	
12	1	Desarie Walwyn	Saint Kitts and Nevis	24.05	
13	2	Lian Lucas	Barbados	24.75	
14	1	Verónica Quijano	El Salvador	25.97	

Final – July 11
Wind:
+3.8 m/s

Rank	Name	Nationality	Time	Notes
1st place, gold medalist(s)	Cydonie Mothersill	Cayman Islands	22.26	
2nd place, silver medalist(s)	Christine Amertil	Bahamas	22.64	
3rd place, bronze medalist(s)	Peta-Gaye Dowdie	Jamaica	22.72	
4	Sheri-Ann Brooks	Jamaica	22.99	
5	Roxana Díaz	Cuba	23.14	
6	LaVerne Jones-Ferrette	United States Virgin Islands	23.15	
7	Wilmary Álvarez	Venezuela	23.25	
8	Virgil Hodge	Saint Kitts and Nevis	23.54	

=== 400 meters ===
Heats – July 9

Rank	Heat	Name	Nationality	Time	Notes
1	2	Libania Grenot	Cuba	51.62	Q
2	2	Tiandra Ponteen	Saint Kitts and Nevis	51.65	Q
3	1	Aliann Pompey	Guyana	52.50	Q
4	3	Tonique Williams-Darling	Bahamas	52.63	Q
5	1	Ginou Etienne	Haiti	52.69	Q
6	2	Hazel-Ann Regis	Grenada	52.76	q
7	3	Shellene Williams	Jamaica	53.10	Q
8	2	Moya Thompson	Jamaica	53.22	q
9	3	Kineke Alexander	Saint Vincent and the Grenadines	53.43	
10	1	Ruth Grajeda	Mexico	53.60	
11	1	Nickeisha Charles	Trinidad and Tobago	53.65	
12	3	Magali Yánez	Mexico	54.05	
13	3	Kelsey Toussaint	Trinidad and Tobago	54.13	
14	1	Nathandra John	Saint Kitts and Nevis	54.18	
15	1	Indira Terrero	Cuba	55.47	
16	3	Lorena de la Rosa	Dominican Republic	55.50	
17	2	Sharon Larrier	Barbados	56.06	
18	2	Verónica Quijano	El Salvador	58.81	

Final – July 10

Rank	Name	Nationality	Time	Notes
1st place, gold medalist(s)	Tonique Williams-Darling	Bahamas	50.97	
2nd place, silver medalist(s)	Tiandra Ponteen	Saint Kitts and Nevis	51.41	
3rd place, bronze medalist(s)	Libania Grenot	Cuba	51.53	
4	Aliann Pompey	Guyana	52.21	
5	Shellene Williams	Jamaica	52.78	
6	Moya Thompson	Jamaica	52.79	
7	Hazel-Ann Regis	Grenada	52.79	
8	Ginou Etienne	Haiti	52.87	

=== 800 meters ===
Heats – July 10

Rank	Heat	Name	Nationality	Time	Notes
1	1	Yuneisi Santiusti	Cuba	2:04.37	Q
2	1	Neisha Bernard-Thomas	Grenada	2:04.39	Q
2	1	Aneita Denton	Jamaica	2:04.39	Q
4	2	Adriana Muñoz	Cuba	2:08.87	Q
5	2	Sheena Gooding	Barbados	2:08.97	Q
6	2	Kay-Ann Thompson	Jamaica	2:11.43	Q
7	1	Lizaira del Valle	Puerto Rico	2:13.21	q
8	1	Janill Williams	Antigua and Barbuda	2:17.99	q
9	2	Nichelle Gibbs	United States Virgin Islands	2:20.35	
10	1	Snany Eugene	United States Virgin Islands	2:23.89	
11	2	Tikisha Walwyn	Saint Kitts and Nevis	2:27.53	
	1	Melissa de Leon	Trinidad and Tobago	DNF	

Final – July 11

Rank	Name	Nationality	Time	Notes
1st place, gold medalist(s)	Neisha Bernard-Thomas	Grenada	2:01.07	NR
2nd place, silver medalist(s)	Aneita Denton	Jamaica	2:01.66	
3rd place, bronze medalist(s)	Yuneisi Santiusti	Cuba	2:02.38	
4	Sheena Gooding	Barbados	2:03.59	NR
5	Adriana Muñoz	Cuba	2:04.17	
6	Lizaira del Valle	Puerto Rico	2:05.46	
	Kay-Ann Thompson	Jamaica	DNF	
	Janill Williams	Antigua and Barbuda	DNS	

=== 1500 meters ===
July 10

Rank	Name	Nationality	Time	Notes
1st place, gold medalist(s)	Yadira Bataille	Cuba	4:26.43	
2nd place, silver medalist(s)	Ashley Couper	Bermuda	4:26.91	
3rd place, bronze medalist(s)	Yudileyvis Castillo	Cuba	4:30.83	
4	Jacqueline Núnez	Dominican Republic	4:37.31	
5	Angélica Sánchez	Mexico	5:00.44	
	Janill Williams	Antigua and Barbuda	DNF	

=== 5000 meters ===
July 9

Rank	Name	Nationality	Time	Notes
1st place, gold medalist(s)	Yudelkis Martínez	Cuba	17:12.58	
2nd place, silver medalist(s)	Angélica Sánchez	Mexico	17:15.00	
3rd place, bronze medalist(s)	Yudileyvis Castillo	Cuba	17:32.37	
4	Dina Judith Cruz	Guatemala	17:51.92	
5	Elsa Monterroso	Guatemala	18:03.15	
6	Lisha Hamilton	United States Virgin Islands	18:45.57	

=== 10,000 meters ===
July 11

Rank	Name	Nationality	Time	Notes
1st place, gold medalist(s)	Yudelkis Martínez	Cuba	34:53.50	
2nd place, silver medalist(s)	Mariela González	Cuba	35:09.62	
3rd place, bronze medalist(s)	Angélica Sánchez	Mexico	36:36.79	
4	Dina Judith Cruz	Guatemala	36:47.71	
5	Lourdes Cruz	Puerto Rico	37:27.47	
6	Elsa Monterroso	Guatemala	39:59.45	

=== 100 meters hurdles ===
Heats – July 10
Wind:
Heat 1: +1.0 m/s, Heat 2: +1.7 m/s

Rank	Heat	Name	Nationality	Time	Notes
1	2	Nadine Faustin-Parker	Haiti	13.00	Q
2	1	Andrea Bliss	Jamaica	13.14	Q
3	1	Yahumara Neyra	Cuba	13.30	Q
4	2	Yenima Arencibia	Cuba	13.60	Q
5	1	Zolymar Febles	Puerto Rico	13.69	Q
6	1	Tiavannia Thompson	Bahamas	14.15	q
7	1	Lauren Maul	Barbados	14.32	q
8	2	Janelle Brathwaite	Barbados	14.48	Q

Final – July 10
Wind:
+1.5 m/s

Rank	Name	Nationality	Time	Notes
1st place, gold medalist(s)	Nadine Faustin-Parker	Haiti	12.83	
2nd place, silver medalist(s)	Andrea Bliss	Jamaica	12.86	
3rd place, bronze medalist(s)	Yahumara Neyra	Cuba	13.09	
4	Zolymar Febles	Puerto Rico	13.50	
5	Tiavannia Thompson	Bahamas	13.78	NR
6	Lauren Maul	Barbados	14.02	
7	Janelle Brathwaite	Barbados	14.30	
	Yenima Arencibia	Cuba	DNF	

=== 400 meters hurdles ===
July 9

Rank	Name	Nationality	Time	Notes
1st place, gold medalist(s)	Debbie-Ann Parris-Thymes	Jamaica	55.26	
2nd place, silver medalist(s)	Andrea Blackett	Barbados	56.47	
3rd place, bronze medalist(s)	Shevon Stoddart	Jamaica	56.64	
4	Josanne Lucas	Trinidad and Tobago	57.63	
5	Yaniuska Pérez	Cuba	59.88	
6	Yadira Isaac	Cuba	1:01.23	
7	Verónica Quijano	El Salvador	1:01.63	

=== 3000 meters steeplechase ===
July 10

Rank	Name	Nationality	Time	Notes
1st place, gold medalist(s)	Mardrea Hyman	Jamaica	9:54.01	CR
2nd place, silver medalist(s)	Korene Hinds	Jamaica	9:58.05	

=== 4 x 100 meters relay ===
July 10

Rank	Nation	Competitors	Time	Notes
1st place, gold medalist(s)	Jamaica	Danielle Browning, Sheri-Ann Brooks, Beverly McDonald, Peta-Gaye Dowdie	43.21	
2nd place, silver medalist(s)	Bahamas	Tamicka Clarke, Philippa Arnette-Willie, Savatheda Fynes, Chandra Sturrup	43.48	
3rd place, bronze medalist(s)	Cuba	Yahumara Neyra, Roxana Díaz, Misleidys Lazo, Yenima Arencibia	45.07	
4	Dominican Republic	Marleny Mejía, Nelsy Delgado, Yelmi Martínez, Libia Jackson	45.12	NR
	Trinidad and Tobago	Kelsey Toussaint, Nickeisha Charles, Monique Cabral, Fana Ashby	DNF	
	Saint Kitts and Nevis	Nathandra John, Desarie Walwyn, Tanika Liburd, Virgil Hodge	DNF	
	Haiti		DNS	

=== 4 x 400 meters relay ===
July 11

Rank	Nation	Competitors	Time	Notes
1st place, gold medalist(s)	Jamaica	Moya Thompson, Sonita Sutherland, Shellene Williams, Allison Beckford	3:30.63	
2nd place, silver medalist(s)	Bahamas	Sasha Rolle, Christine Amertil, Shakeitha Henfield, Tonique Williams-Darling	3:33.14	NR
3rd place, bronze medalist(s)	Cuba	Indira Terrero, Yaniuska Pérez, Yadira Isaac, Libania Grenot	3:33.85	
4	Trinidad and Tobago	Nickeisha Charles, Kelsey Toussaint, Monique Cabral, Josanne Lucas	3:35.55	
5	Dominican Republic	Lorena de la Rosa, Libia Jackson, Nelsy Delgado, Yelmi Martínez	3:43.20	

=== 10,000 meters walk ===
July 10

Rank	Name	Nationality	Time	Notes
1st place, gold medalist(s)	Cristina López	El Salvador	45:52.32	
2nd place, silver medalist(s)	Evelyn Núnez	Guatemala	47:23.58	
3rd place, bronze medalist(s)	Yarelis Sánchez	Cuba	50:57.73	
4	Verónica Colindres	El Salvador	53:12.47	
	Milexsis Sepúlveda	Puerto Rico	DNF	
	Marángelis Arroyo	Puerto Rico	DNF	

=== High jump ===
July 10

Rank	Name	Nationality	1.55	1.60	1.65	1.70	1.75	1.80	1.85	1.88	1.91	1.94	1.96	Result	Notes
1st place, gold medalist(s)	Levern Spencer	Saint Lucia	–	–	–	–	–	o	o	o	o	xo	xxx	1.94	CR, NR
2nd place, silver medalist(s)	Karen Beautle	Jamaica	–	–	–	o	o	o	o	xxx				1.85	
2nd place, silver medalist(s)	Juana Arrendel	Dominican Republic	–	–	–	–	o	o	o	xxx				1.85	
4	Romary Rifka	Mexico	–	–	–	–	o	o	xxx					1.80	
4	Sheree Francis	Jamaica	–	–	–	o	o	o	xxx					1.80	
6	Yarianny Argüelles	Cuba	–	–	–	–	–	xo	xxx					1.80	
7	Zindzi Swan	Bermuda	–	–	–	xo	o	xo	xxx					1.80	=NR
8	Rhonda Watkins	Trinidad and Tobago	–	–	–	o	o	xxo	xxx					1.80	
9	Fabiola Ayala	Mexico	–	–	o	xo	o	xxo	xxx					1.80	
10	Jhoris Luque	Venezuela	–	–	–	o	o	xxx						1.75	
10	Linda Louissaint	Haiti												1.75	
12	Krishanda Campbell	Bahamas	o	o	o	xo	xxx							1.70	

=== Pole vault ===
July 9

Rank	Name	Nationality	3.70	3.80	3.90	4.00	4.05	4.10	4.15	4.25	4.30	Result	Notes
1st place, gold medalist(s)	Katiuska Pérez	Cuba	–	o	o	o	o	xo	xo	xo	xxx	4.25	CR, =AR
2nd place, silver medalist(s)	Dennise Orengo	Puerto Rico	–	o	o	o	xxo	xo	xxx			4.10	
3rd place, bronze medalist(s)	Maryoris Sánchez	Cuba										4.00	
	Andrea Zambrana	Puerto Rico	xxx									NM	

=== Long jump ===
July 11

Rank	Name	Nationality	#1	#2	#3	#4	#5	#6	Result	Notes
1st place, gold medalist(s)	Yargelis Savigne	Cuba	6.68w	6.43w	x	6.88w	x	6.59w	6.88w	
2nd place, silver medalist(s)	Elva Goulbourne	Jamaica	6.48w	6.78w	x	6.77w	x	6.50	6.78w	
3rd place, bronze medalist(s)	Jackie Edwards	Bahamas	6.56w	6.71w	x	x	3.46w	x	6.71w	
4	Tanika Liburd	Saint Kitts and Nevis	5.94	6.45w	6.23w	6.23w	x	6.41w	6.45w	
5	Peta-Gaye Beckford	Jamaica	5.85w	x	6.43w	x	6.11w	6.24w	6.43w	
6	Seidre Forde	Barbados	x	x	5.87	5.98	5.83w	5.76w	5.98	
7	Claudette Martínez	Mexico	x	5.42w	5.95w	5.74w	x	5.76w	5.95w	
8	Adriana Severino	Dominican Republic	5.87	5.72w	5.80w	x	5.32w	x	5.87	
9	Rhonda Watkins	Trinidad and Tobago	5.86w	x	5.82w				5.86w	
10	Zindzi Swan	Bermuda	5.86	x	x				5.86	
11	Linda Louissaint	Haiti	x	x	5.81w				5.81w	
12	Jennifer Arveláez	Venezuela	5.43	5.54w	5.75w				5.75w	
13	Tahesia Harrigan	British Virgin Islands	x	5.73w	x				5.73w	
14	Silvienne Krosendijk	Aruba	5.62w	5.63	5.22w				5.63	
15	Sabrina Asturias	Guatemala	x	5.50w	5.49w				5.50w	

=== Triple jump ===
July 9

Rank	Name	Nationality	#1	#2	#3	#4	#5	#6	Result	Notes
1st place, gold medalist(s)	Yarianna Martínez	Cuba	13.90	13.70	13.70	13.63	13.15	14.18	14.18	CR
2nd place, silver medalist(s)	Mabel Gay	Cuba	13.74	13.76	13.60	13.90	x	13.97	13.97	
3rd place, bronze medalist(s)	Jennifer Arveláez	Venezuela	13.09	13.03	13.01	x	12.81	x	13.09	
4	Seidre Forde	Barbados	12.90	12.80	x	12.67	13.09	12.39	13.09	
5	Sheron Mark	Trinidad and Tobago	12.84	x	12.36	x	x	12.44	12.84	
6	Linda Toussaint	Haiti	x	12.58	12.44	12.11	11.81	12.83	12.83	
7	Andrea Linton	Jamaica	12.22	12.15	12.68	12.26	11.90	x	12.68	
8	Donnavette Martin	Bahamas	12.51	x	11.81	–	12.22	x	12.51	
9	Luan Weekes	Barbados	12.06	x	12.21				12.21	
10	Claudia Lugo	Mexico	x	x	12.13				12.13	
11	María Carrillo	El Salvador	11.91	x	x				11.91	
12	Zindzi Swan	Bermuda	11.81	x	x				11.81	

=== Shot put ===
July 11

Rank	Name	Nationality	#1	#2	#3	#4	#5	#6	Result	Notes
1st place, gold medalist(s)	Yumileidi Cumbá	Cuba	17.59	18.61	x	18.98	18.57	18.98	18.98	CR
2nd place, silver medalist(s)	Cleopatra Borel-Brown	Trinidad and Tobago	16.74	17.37	18.02	17.68	18.05	17.83	18.05	
3rd place, bronze medalist(s)	Kimberly Barrett	Jamaica	17.19	17.93	17.48	16.92	18.03	16.48	18.03	
4	Mailín Vargas	Cuba	16.31	x	x	16.70	15.72	16.51	16.70	
5	Candice Scott	Trinidad and Tobago	16.04	16.20	x	x	16.21	16.43	16.43	
6	Aymara Albury	Bahamas	16.03	x	14.96	x	14.49	x	16.03	
7	Mary Mercedes	Dominican Republic	13.94	13.43	14.33	14.47	13.97	14.10	14.47	
8	Shernelle Nicholls	Barbados	13.52	13.83	13.39	12.51	13.51	x	13.83	
9	Tamara Lechuga	Mexico	13.24	12.89	13.07				13.24	
10	Keisha Walkes	Barbados	12.59	12.64	x				12.64	
11	Doroty López	Guatemala	11.80	11.66	11.95				11.95	

=== Discus throw ===
July 9

Rank	Name	Nationality	#1	#2	#3	#4	#5	#6	Result	Notes
1st place, gold medalist(s)	Yarelys Barrios	Cuba	x	x	55.29	x	56.59	x	56.59	
2nd place, silver medalist(s)	Lisandra Rodríguez	Cuba	53.07	x	50.41	49.84	x	47.88	53.07	
3rd place, bronze medalist(s)	Chafree Bain	Bahamas	47.36	x	x	44.39	43.79	x	47.36	
4	Annie Alexander	Trinidad and Tobago	46.09	44.35	x	39.43	x	45.35	46.09	NJR
5	Melisa Mojica	Puerto Rico	43.46	44.38	x	x	x	43.45	44.38	
6	Keisha Walkes	Barbados	42.25	x	33.90	42.83	41.09	38.58	42.83	
7	Doroty López	Guatemala	41.20	41.24	39.89	40.23	38.29	x	41.24	
8	Shernelle Nicholls	Barbados	34.35	x	40.96	41.08	37.26	39.89	41.08	
9	Mary Mercedes	Dominican Republic	x	38.34	x				38.34	

=== Hammer throw ===
July 9

Rank	Name	Nationality	#1	#2	#3	#4	#5	#6	Result	Notes
1st place, gold medalist(s)	Candice Scott	Trinidad and Tobago	62.91	58.43	64.00	64.93	x	67.44	67.44	
2nd place, silver medalist(s)	Yunaika Crawford	Cuba	65.58	63.94	65.36	66.75	x	66.52	66.75	CR
3rd place, bronze medalist(s)	Natalie Grant	Jamaica	x	x	50.64	61.34	56.69	59.62	61.34	
4	Arasay Thondike	Cuba	60.49	x	x	x	x	x	60.49	
5	Caltha Seymour	Jamaica	56.33	x	56.77	x	57.69	55.90	57.69	
6	Chafree Bain	Bahamas	52.92	x	54.70	x	x	x	54.70	
7	Aymara Albury	Bahamas	x	46.32	50.48	48.84	49.54	53.51	53.51	
8	Jéssica Ponce De León	Mexico	x	52.28	x	x	x	x	52.28	
9	Amarilys Alméstica	Puerto Rico	x	x	48.66				48.66	

=== Javelin throw ===
July 10

Rank	Name	Nationality	#1	#2	#3	#4	#5	#6	Result	Notes
1st place, gold medalist(s)	Laverne Eve	Bahamas	56.53	57.07	x	60.52	61.11	59.78	61.11	
2nd place, silver medalist(s)	Olivia McKoy	Jamaica	52.24	60.58	x	59.48	57.30	61.10	61.10	NR
3rd place, bronze medalist(s)	Noraida Bicet	Cuba	x	55.38	59.05	58.98	58.10	x	59.05	
4	Ana Erika Gutiérrez	Mexico	51.64	51.88	54.35	50.09	49.51	x	54.35	NR
5	Kateema Riettie	Jamaica	x	50.68	51.61	47.81	47.65	47.70	51.61	
6	Tracy Morrison	Bahamas	44.90	43.31	x	41.39	42.57	x	44.90	NJR

=== Heptathlon ===
July 10–11

The highest mark recorded in each event is highlighted in yellow

Rank	Athlete	Nationality	100m H	HJ	SP	200m	LJ	JT	800m	Points	Notes
1st place, gold medalist(s)	Juana Castillo	Dominican Republic	14.17	1.72	13.01	25.30w	5.59w	44.59	2:17.45	5760	
2nd place, silver medalist(s)	Yasmiany Pedroso	Cuba	14.21	1.75	12.74	26.04w	5.66w	41.83	2:32.57	5479	
3rd place, bronze medalist(s)	Cheilín Povea	Cuba	14.32	1.72	9.79	24.29w	5.50w	30.22	2:20.14	5285	
4	Coralys Ortiz	Puerto Rico	14.62	1.63	11.33	25.45w	5.48w	44.39	2:51.60	5019w	
5	Yaritza Rivera	Puerto Rico	15.02	1.66	11.31	26.21w	5.75w	29.59	2:33.99	4927	
6	María Gabriela Carrillo	El Salvador	15.50	1.66	8.72	27.12w	5.56w	28.59	2:39.10	4481	
7	Kim Carter	Barbados	15.38	1.48	10.46	25.47w	4.80w	35.08	2:40.40	4442	
