= Miami Hurricanes track and field =

College track and field team

- University: University of Miami
- Head coach: Amy Deem
- Conference: ACC
- Location: Miami, Florida
- Outdoor track: Cobb Stadium
- Nickname: Hurricanes
- Colors: Orange, green, and white

The Miami Hurricanes track and field team is the track and field program that represents University of Miami. The Hurricanes compete in NCAA Division I as a member of the Atlantic Coast Conference. The team is based in Miami, Florida at the Cobb Stadium.

The program is coached by Amy Deem. The track and field program officially encompasses four teams, as the NCAA regards men's and women's indoor track and field and outdoor track and field as separate sports.

Gillian Russell is the Hurricanes' most successful athlete at the collegiate level, winning five NCAA titles in the sprint hurdles.

== Postseason ==
As of 2024, a total of 14 men and 39 women have achieved individual first-team All-American status at the Division I men's outdoor, women's outdoor, men's indoor, or women's indoor national championships.

First team All-Americans
Team	Championships	Name	Event	Place	Ref.
Women's	1992 Indoor	Gillian Russell	55 meters hurdles	1st	
Men's	1992 Outdoor	Bill Deering	Pole vault	4th	
Men's	1992 Outdoor	Horace Copeland	Long jump	5th	
Women's	1992 Outdoor	Gillian Russell	100 meters hurdles	7th	
Women's	1993 Indoor	Gillian Russell	55 meters hurdles	4th	
Women's	1993 Outdoor	Gillian Russell	100 meters hurdles	1st	
Men's	1994 Outdoor	Bill Deering	Pole vault	2nd	
Women's	1994 Outdoor	Gillian Russell	100 meters hurdles	1st	
Women's	1994 Outdoor	Lakeya Avant	4 × 100 meters relay	7th	
Women's	1994 Outdoor	Latesha Grier	4 × 100 meters relay	7th	
Women's	1994 Outdoor	Jeanette Williams	4 × 100 meters relay	7th	
Women's	1994 Outdoor	Gillian Russell	4 × 100 meters relay	7th	
Men's	1995 Indoor	Ronald Thorne	800 meters	5th	
Women's	1995 Indoor	Gillian Russell	55 meters hurdles	1st	
Women's	1995 Indoor	Patrina Allen	55 meters hurdles	7th	
Men's	1995 Outdoor	Davian Clarke	400 meters	5th	
Women's	1995 Outdoor	Gillian Russell	100 meters hurdles	1st	
Women's	1995 Outdoor	Patrina Allen	100 meters hurdles	7th	
Women's	1995 Outdoor	LaKeya Avant	4 × 100 meters relay	6th	
Women's	1995 Outdoor	Patrina Allen	4 × 100 meters relay	6th	
Women's	1995 Outdoor	Gillian Russell	4 × 100 meters relay	6th	
Women's	1995 Outdoor	Latesha Grier	4 × 100 meters relay	6th	
Men's	1996 Indoor	Davian Clarke	400 meters	4th	
Women's	1996 Indoor	Patrina Allen	55 meters hurdles	6th	
Men's	1996 Outdoor	Davian Clarke	400 meters	1st	
Women's	1996 Outdoor	Yolanda McCray	100 meters hurdles	7th	
Men's	1997 Indoor	Caldrequis Lesley	55 meters hurdles	6th	
Women's	1997 Indoor	Yolanda McCray	55 meters hurdles	4th	
Men's	1997 Outdoor	Davian Clarke	400 meters	6th	
Women's	1997 Outdoor	Yolanda McCray	100 meters hurdles	5th	
Men's	1998 Indoor	Davian Clarke	400 meters	1st	
Women's	1998 Indoor	Patrina Allen	55 meters hurdles	5th	
Men's	1998 Outdoor	Davian Clarke	400 meters	2nd	
Women's	1998 Outdoor	Patrina Allen	400 meters hurdles	5th	
Women's	1998 Outdoor	Ronalee Davis	Long jump	6th	
Women's	1999 Indoor	Yolanda McCray	60 meters hurdles	3rd	
Women's	1999 Outdoor	Yolanda McCray	100 meters hurdles	1st	
Women's	2000 Indoor	Natalie Watson	800 meters	6th	
Women's	2000 Indoor	Kareen Clarke	Triple jump	5th	
Women's	2001 Indoor	Natalie Watson	800 meters	4th	
Women's	2001 Indoor	Patricia Pearson	800 meters	5th	
Women's	2001 Indoor	Kareen Clarke	Triple jump	7th	
Women's	2001 Outdoor	Kareen Clarke	Triple jump	6th	
Women's	2002 Indoor	Lauryn Williams	60 meters	7th	
Women's	2002 Indoor	Kareen Clarke	Triple jump	3rd	
Women's	2002 Outdoor	Lauryn Williams	100 meters	6th	
Women's	2002 Outdoor	Wyllesheia Myrick	100 meters	8th	
Women's	2002 Outdoor	Saraque Whittaker	4 × 400 meters relay	7th	
Women's	2002 Outdoor	Jamillah Wade	4 × 400 meters relay	7th	
Women's	2002 Outdoor	Jenise Winston	4 × 400 meters relay	7th	
Women's	2002 Outdoor	Kitoya Carter	4 × 400 meters relay	7th	
Women's	2002 Outdoor	Kareen Clarke	Triple jump	3rd	
Women's	2003 Indoor	Lauryn Williams	60 meters	4th	
Women's	2003 Indoor	Sharianne Lawson	60 meters hurdles	4th	
Women's	2003 Indoor	Dominique Darden	4 × 400 meters relay	5th	
Women's	2003 Indoor	Jamillah Wade	4 × 400 meters relay	5th	
Women's	2003 Indoor	Kitoya Carter	4 × 400 meters relay	5th	
Women's	2003 Indoor	Charlette Greggs	4 × 400 meters relay	5th	
Women's	2003 Outdoor	Lauryn Williams	100 meters	3rd	
Women's	2003 Outdoor	Charlette Greggs	400 meters	8th	
Women's	2003 Outdoor	Lauryn Williams	4 × 100 meters relay	7th	
Women's	2003 Outdoor	Charlette Greggs	4 × 100 meters relay	7th	
Women's	2003 Outdoor	Dominique Darden	4 × 100 meters relay	7th	
Women's	2003 Outdoor	Sashanie Simpson	4 × 100 meters relay	7th	
Women's	2003 Outdoor	Kitoya Carter	4 × 400 meters relay	4th	
Women's	2003 Outdoor	Jamillah Wade	4 × 400 meters relay	4th	
Women's	2003 Outdoor	Dominique Darden	4 × 400 meters relay	4th	
Women's	2003 Outdoor	Charlette Greggs	4 × 400 meters relay	4th	
Women's	2004 Indoor	Lauryn Williams	60 meters	5th	
Women's	2004 Indoor	Lauryn Williams	200 meters	4th	
Women's	2004 Indoor	Lauryn Williams	200 meters	4th	
Women's	2004 Indoor	Tabia Charles	Long jump	4th	
Women's	2004 Indoor	Tabia Charles	Triple jump	4th	
Women's	2004 Indoor	Kim Barrett	Shot put	8th	
Women's	2004 Outdoor	Lauryn Williams	100 meters	1st	
Women's	2004 Outdoor	Lauryn Williams	100 meters	1st	
Women's	2004 Outdoor	Dominique Darden	400 meters hurdles	5th	
Women's	2004 Outdoor	Chinela Davis	4 × 100 meters relay	3rd	
Women's	2004 Outdoor	Lauryn Williams	4 × 100 meters relay	3rd	
Women's	2004 Outdoor	Dominique Darden	4 × 100 meters relay	3rd	
Women's	2004 Outdoor	India Ransom	4 × 100 meters relay	3rd	
Women's	2004 Outdoor	Wiande Moore	4 × 400 meters relay	8th	
Women's	2004 Outdoor	Ginou Etienne	4 × 400 meters relay	8th	
Women's	2004 Outdoor	Kitoya Carter	4 × 400 meters relay	8th	
Women's	2004 Outdoor	Charlette Greggs	4 × 400 meters relay	8th	
Women's	2004 Outdoor	Tabia Charles	Long jump	8th	
Women's	2005 Indoor	Dominique Darden	60 meters hurdles	7th	
Women's	2005 Indoor	Ginou Etienne	400 meters	5th	
Women's	2005 Indoor	Wiande Moore	4 × 400 meters relay	6th	
Women's	2005 Indoor	Dominique Darden	4 × 400 meters relay	6th	
Women's	2005 Indoor	Lauren Austin	4 × 400 meters relay	6th	
Women's	2005 Indoor	Charlette Greggs	4 × 400 meters relay	6th	
Women's	2005 Indoor	Tabia Charles	Long jump	7th	
Women's	2005 Indoor	Tabia Charles	Triple jump	6th	
Women's	2005 Indoor	Kim Barrett	Shot put	1st	
Women's	2005 Indoor	Kim Barrett	Weight throw	5th	
Women's	2005 Indoor	Amber Williams	Pentathlon	5th	
Women's	2005 Outdoor	Dominique Darden	400 meters hurdles	6th	
Women's	2005 Outdoor	Dominique Darden	4 × 100 meters relay	7th	
Women's	2005 Outdoor	Wiande Moore	4 × 100 meters relay	7th	
Women's	2005 Outdoor	India Ransom	4 × 100 meters relay	7th	
Women's	2005 Outdoor	Lauren Austin	4 × 100 meters relay	7th	
Women's	2005 Outdoor	Wiande Moore	4 × 400 meters relay	4th	
Women's	2005 Outdoor	Ginou Etienne	4 × 400 meters relay	4th	
Women's	2005 Outdoor	Dominique Darden	4 × 400 meters relay	4th	
Women's	2005 Outdoor	Lauren Austin	4 × 400 meters relay	4th	
Women's	2005 Outdoor	Tabia Charles	Triple jump	6th	
Women's	2005 Outdoor	Kim Barrett	Shot put	1st	
Women's	2006 Indoor	Dominique Darden	400 meters	2nd	
Women's	2006 Indoor	Ginou Etienne	4 × 400 meters relay	4th	
Women's	2006 Indoor	Charlette Greggs	4 × 400 meters relay	4th	
Women's	2006 Indoor	Dominique Darden	4 × 400 meters relay	4th	
Women's	2006 Indoor	Krista Simkins	4 × 400 meters relay	4th	
Women's	2006 Indoor	Brenda Faluade	Long jump	7th	
Women's	2006 Indoor	Tabia Charles	Long jump	8th	
Women's	2006 Indoor	Tabia Charles	Triple jump	3rd	
Women's	2006 Indoor	Brenda Faluade	Triple jump	4th	
Men's	2006 Outdoor	Tim Harris	800 meters	7th	
Women's	2006 Outdoor	Dominique Darden	400 meters hurdles	3rd	
Women's	2006 Outdoor	Amy Seward	4 × 100 meters relay	7th	
Women's	2006 Outdoor	Krista Simkins	4 × 100 meters relay	7th	
Women's	2006 Outdoor	Dominique Darden	4 × 100 meters relay	7th	
Women's	2006 Outdoor	India Ransom	4 × 100 meters relay	7th	
Women's	2006 Outdoor	Krista Simkins	4 × 400 meters relay	2nd	
Women's	2006 Outdoor	Ginou Etienne	4 × 400 meters relay	2nd	
Women's	2006 Outdoor	Ena Leufroy	4 × 400 meters relay	2nd	
Women's	2006 Outdoor	Dominique Darden	4 × 400 meters relay	2nd	
Women's	2006 Outdoor	Tabitha Charles	Long jump	8th	
Women's	2006 Outdoor	Tabia Charles	Triple jump	1st	
Women's	2006 Outdoor	Brenda Faluade	Triple jump	6th	
Women's	2007 Indoor	Ginou Etienne	400 meters	4th	
Women's	2007 Indoor	Brenda Faluade	Long jump	2nd	
Women's	2007 Outdoor	Amy Seward	Long jump	7th	
Women's	2007 Outdoor	Brenda Faluade	Triple jump	7th	
Men's	2008 Indoor	Tim Harris	800 meters	4th	
Women's	2008 Indoor	Krista Simkins	400 meters	1st	
Women's	2008 Outdoor	Takecia Jameson	400 meters hurdles	3rd	
Women's	2008 Outdoor	T'erea Brown	400 meters hurdles	8th	
Women's	2008 Outdoor	Khadija Talley	Discus throw	4th	
Men's	2009 Indoor	Mikese Morse	Long jump	5th	
Women's	2009 Indoor	Murielle Ahouré-Demps	60 meters	5th	
Women's	2009 Indoor	Murielle Ahouré-Demps	200 meters	1st	
Women's	2009 Outdoor	Murielle Ahouré-Demps	100 meters	7th	
Women's	2009 Outdoor	Murielle Ahouré-Demps	200 meters	4th	
Women's	2009 Outdoor	T'erea Brown	400 meters hurdles	2nd	
Women's	2010 Indoor	T'erea Brown	60 meters hurdles	3rd	
Women's	2010 Outdoor	T'erea Brown	100 meters hurdles	2nd	
Women's	2010 Outdoor	T'erea Brown	400 meters hurdles	2nd	
Women's	2010 Outdoor	Tameka Johnson	400 meters hurdles	3rd	
Women's	2010 Outdoor	Takecia Jameson	400 meters hurdles	7th	
Men's	2011 Indoor	Devon Hill	60 meters hurdles	3rd	
Women's	2011 Outdoor	T'erea Brown	100 meters hurdles	8th	
Women's	2011 Outdoor	T'erea Brown	400 meters hurdles	1st	
Men's	2012 Indoor	Devon Hill	60 meters hurdles	2nd	
Women's	2012 Outdoor	Thandi Stewart	400 meters hurdles	4th	
Women's	2012 Outdoor	Samantha Williams	Triple jump	7th	
Women's	2014 Indoor	Alysha Newman	Pole vault	5th	
Women's	2014 Outdoor	Alysha Newman	Pole vault	7th	
Women's	2015 Indoor	Lea Johnson	Weight throw	8th	
Women's	2015 Outdoor	Shakima Wimbley	400 meters	5th	
Women's	2015 Outdoor	Kelsey Balkwill	4 × 400 meters relay	5th	
Women's	2015 Outdoor	Taneisha Cordell	4 × 400 meters relay	5th	
Women's	2015 Outdoor	Anthonia Moore	4 × 400 meters relay	5th	
Women's	2015 Outdoor	Shakima Wimbley	4 × 400 meters relay	5th	
Women's	2016 Indoor	Dakota Dailey-Harris	High jump	3rd	
Women's	2016 Indoor	Alysha Newman	Pole vault	4th	
Women's	2016 Outdoor	Shakima Wimbley	400 meters	3rd	
Women's	2016 Outdoor	Erin Ford	4 × 400 meters relay	7th	
Women's	2016 Outdoor	Aiyanna Stiverne	4 × 400 meters relay	7th	
Women's	2016 Outdoor	Brittny Ellis	4 × 400 meters relay	7th	
Women's	2016 Outdoor	Shakima Wimbley	4 × 400 meters relay	7th	
Women's	2016 Outdoor	Alysha Newman	Pole vault	2nd	
Women's	2017 Indoor	Shakima Wimbley	400 meters	1st	
Women's	2017 Indoor	Brittny Ellis	400 meters	8th	
Women's	2017 Indoor	Aiyanna Stiverne	4 × 400 meters relay	7th	
Women's	2017 Indoor	Brittny Ellis	4 × 400 meters relay	7th	
Women's	2017 Indoor	Michelle Atherley	4 × 400 meters relay	7th	
Women's	2017 Indoor	Shakima Wimbley	4 × 400 meters relay	7th	
Women's	2017 Indoor	Michelle Atherley	Pentathlon	4th	
Women's	2017 Outdoor	Shakima Wimbley	400 meters	2nd	
Women's	2017 Outdoor	Anna Runia	4 × 400 meters relay	7th	
Women's	2017 Outdoor	Aiyanna Stiverne	4 × 400 meters relay	7th	
Women's	2017 Outdoor	Brittny Ellis	4 × 400 meters relay	7th	
Women's	2017 Outdoor	Shakima Wimbley	4 × 400 meters relay	7th	
Women's	2018 Indoor	Michelle Atherley	Pentathlon	6th	
Women's	2019 Indoor	Symone Mason	4 × 400 meters relay	7th	
Women's	2019 Indoor	Brittny Ellis	4 × 400 meters relay	7th	
Women's	2019 Indoor	Kayla Johnson	4 × 400 meters relay	7th	
Women's	2019 Indoor	Samantha Gonzalez	4 × 400 meters relay	7th	
Women's	2019 Indoor	Michelle Atherley	Pentathlon	1st	
Women's	2019 Outdoor	Tiara McMinn	100 meters hurdles	7th	
Women's	2019 Outdoor	Samantha Gonzalez	400 meters hurdles	8th	
Women's	2019 Outdoor	Deborah Ajagbe	Discus throw	5th	
Women's	2019 Outdoor	Michelle Atherley	Heptathlon	3rd	
Women's	2021 Indoor	Alfreda Steele	60 meters	5th	
Women's	2021 Indoor	Tiara McMinn	60 meters hurdles	4th	
Women's	2021 Outdoor	Alfreda Steele	100 meters	5th	
Women's	2021 Outdoor	Alfreda Steele	200 meters	7th	
Women's	2021 Outdoor	Michelle Atherley	Heptathlon	2nd	
Men's	2022 Outdoor	Jeff Williams	Discus throw	6th	
Men's	2022 Outdoor	Décio Andrade	Hammer throw	7th	
Women's	2022 Outdoor	Deborah Ajagbe	Discus throw	7th	
Men's	2023 Indoor	Russell Robinson	Triple jump	8th	
Men's	2023 Indoor	Décio Andrade	Weight throw	4th	
Men's	2023 Outdoor	Russell Robinson	Triple jump	2nd	
Men's	2023 Outdoor	Décio Andrade	Hammer throw	4th	
Women's	2023 Outdoor	Hannah Hall	Shot put	8th	
Men's	2024 Indoor	Russell Robinson	Triple jump	1st	
Men's	2024 Outdoor	Russell Robinson	Triple jump	2nd	
Men's	2024 Outdoor	Milton Ingraham II	Discus throw	7th	
Men's	2024 Outdoor	Devoux Deysel	Javelin throw	3rd	
Men's	2024 Outdoor	Edgar Campré	Decathlon	3rd	
Women's	2024 Outdoor	Deisiane Teixeira	Javelin throw	8th	

== See also ==
- Category:Miami Hurricanes men's track and field athletes (10)
- Category:Miami Hurricanes women's track and field athletes (16)
