= 2005 World Championships in Athletics – Women's shot put =

The Women's Shot Put event at the 2005 World Championships in Athletics was held at the Helsinki Olympic Stadium on August 12 and August 13. The event was won by Nadzeya Ostapchuk of Belarus but when samples taken from her during those games were retested in 2013, they revealed she had been doping.

After revision, Olga Ryabinkina from Russia and Valerie Vili from New Zealand were promoted to gold and silver respectively. The bronze medal was awarded to Nadine Kleinert from Germany who originally finished fifth since all the results of the fourth-placer Svetlana Krivelyova of Russia between August 18, 2004, and August 17, 2006, were annulled in a separate doping case.

The winning margin was 2 cm which as of 2024 remains the only time the women's shot put has been won by less than 3 cm at these championships.

== Medalists ==
Gold	Olga Ryabinkina; Russia (RUS)
Silver	Valerie Vili; New Zealand (NZL)
Bronze	Nadine Kleinert; Germany (GER)

== Schedule ==
- All times are Eastern European Time (UTC+2)

Qualification Round
Group A	Group B
12.08.2005 – 18:30h	12.08.2005 – 17:30h
Final Round
13.08.2005 – 18:40h

== Abbreviations ==
- All results shown are in metres

Q	automatic qualification
q	qualification by rank
DNS	did not start
NM	no mark
WR	world record
AR	area record
NR	national record
PB	personal best
SB	season best

== Records ==
Standing records prior to the 2005 World Athletics Championships
World Record	Natalya Lisovskaya (URS)	22.63 m	June 7, 1987	Moscow, Soviet Union
Event Record	Natalya Lisovskaya (URS)	21.24 m	September 5, 1987	Rome, Italy

== Qualification ==
=== Group A ===
Rank	Athlete	Attempts			Result	Note
Rank	Athlete	1	2	3	Result	Note
1	Yumileidi Cumbá (CUB)	X	18.94	—	18.94 m	
2	Olga Ryabinkina (RUS)	17.65	18.72	—	18.72 m	
3	Li Meiju (CHN)	17.30	17.31	18.35	18.35 m	
4	Assunta Legnante (ITA)	17.46	17.80	18.06	18.06 m	
5	Lieja Tunks (NED)	17.75	17.62	17.87	17.87 m	
6	Olga Ivanova (RUS)	X	17.21	17.80	17.80 m	
7	Petra Lammert (GER)	X	17.72	17.56	17.72 m	
8	Kristin Heaston (USA)	17.53	X	X	17.53 m	
9	Vivian Chukwuemeka (NGR)	X	17.50	17.35	17.50 m	
10	Elisângela Adriano (BRA)	15.86	16.18	16.94	16.94 m	
11	Cristiana Checchi (ITA)	X	16.35	16.67	16.67 m	
12	Ana Po'uhila (TGA)	X	15.14	X	15.14 m	
	~~Nadezhda Ostapchuk (BLR)~~	~~19.65~~	—	—	~~19.65 m~~	DQ

=== Group B ===
Rank	Athlete	Attempts			Result	Note
Rank	Athlete	1	2	3	Result	Note
1	Valerie Vili (NZL)	19.87	—	—	19.87 m	AR
2	Nadine Kleinert (GER)	18.90	—	—	18.90 m	
3	Natallia Kharaneka (BLR)	18.83	—	—	18.83 m	
4	Misleydis González (CUB)	18.53	—	—	18.53 m	
5	Christina Schwanitz (GER)	17.82	18.17	18.35	18.35 m	
6	Kimberly Barrett (JAM)	17.14	17.85	17.34	17.85 m	
7	Chiara Rosa (ITA)	17.32	X	X	17.32 m	
8	Cleopatra Borel-Brown (TRI)	17.31	X	16.96	17.31 m	
9	Oksana Chibisova (RUS)	16.67	16.30	16.41	16.67 m	
10	Lee Mi-Young (KOR)	16.18	X	16.69	16.60 m	
11	Yoko Toyonaga (JPN)	16.51	15.96	16.24	16.51 m	
12	Elizabeth Wanless (USA)	16.50	15.98	15.73	16.50 m	
	~~Svetlana Krivelyova (RUS)~~	~~19.28~~	—	—	~~19.28 m~~	DQ

== Final ==
Rank	Athlete	Attempts						Result	Note
Rank	Athlete	1	2	3	4	5	6	Result	Note
1st place, gold medalist(s)	Olga Ryabinkina (RUS)	X	19.34	19.64	X	19.06	18.76	19.64 m	
2nd place, silver medalist(s)	Valerie Vili (NZL)	X	18.23	19.62	19.33	X	19.62	19.62 m	
3rd place, bronze medalist(s)	Nadine Kleinert (GER)	X	17.92	18.70	18.87	19.07	X	19.07 m	
4	Yumileidi Cumbá (CUB)	18.37	X	X	18.57	X	18.64	18.64 m	
5	Li Meiju (CHN)	17.51	18.20	18.35	X	18.10	X	18.35 m	
6	Natallia Khoroneko (BLR)	16.91	17.85	18.25	18.02	18.34	X	18.34 m	
7	Christina Schwanitz (GER)	17.55	18.02	X				18.02 m	
8	Misleydis González (CUB)	17.85	18.01	17.82				18.01 m	
9	Lieja Tunks (NED)	17.83	17.60	X				17.83 m	
10	Assunta Legnante (ITA)	X	16.99	X				16.99 m	
	~~Nadezhda Ostapchuk (BLR)~~	~~20.30~~	~~20.13~~	~~X~~	~~X~~	~~20.23~~	~~20.51~~	~~20.51 m~~	
	~~Svetlana Krivelyova (RUS)~~	~~17.35~~	~~18.47~~	~~19.16~~	~~18.59~~	~~19.10~~	~~18.94~~	~~19.16 m~~	

== See also ==
- 2005 Shot Put Year Ranking
