= Elizabeth Wanless =

American shot putter

Elizabeth Wanless (born November 18, 1981) is an American shot putter from Belville, Illinois who competed at the 2005 World Championships without reaching the final round.

Her personal best throw is 18.64 metres (61.2 feet), achieved in June 2009 in Marietta, Georgia.
