= Carlos Jorge (track athlete) =

Athlete from the Dominican Republic

Personal information
- Born: 24 September 1986 (age 39) Monte Plata, Dominican Republic

Sport
- Sport: Track and field

Carlos Rafael Jorge (born 24 September 1986) is a Dominican Republic athlete, competing in sprinting events and the long jump.

His personal best jump is 7.96 metres, achieved in July 2006 in Santo Domingo. This is the current Dominican Republic record. His 200 m best is 20.63 seconds, set in Mayagüez in 2012.

== Competition record ==
Year	Competition	Venue	Position	Event	Notes
Representing Dominican Republic
2003	World Youth Championships	Sherbrooke, Canada	4th	110 m hurdles (91.4 cm)	13.85
2004	World Junior Championships	Grosseto, Italy	25th (h)	110m hurdles	14.50 (wind: +1.3 m/s)
2005	Central American and Caribbean Championships	Nassau, Bahamas	7th	Long jump	7.47 m (w)
2006	Ibero-American Championships	Ponce, Puerto Rico	5th	110 m hurdles	13.95
2006	Ibero-American Championships	Ponce, Puerto Rico	2nd	Long jump	7.84 m
2006	NACAC U-23 Championships	Santo Domingo, Dominican Republic	—	110m hurdles	DNF
2006	NACAC U-23 Championships	Santo Domingo, Dominican Republic	2nd	Long jump	7.96 m (wind: +0.9 m/s)
2006	NACAC U-23 Championships	Santo Domingo, Dominican Republic	—	4 × 100 m relay	DQ
2006	Central American and Caribbean Games	Cartagena, Colombia	6th	110 m hurdles	14.03
2006	Central American and Caribbean Games	Cartagena, Colombia	8th	Long jump	7.33 m
2007	NACAC Championships	San Salvador, El Salvador	1st	Long jump	7.89 m
2007	Pan American Games	Rio de Janeiro, Brazil	6th	Long jump	7.63 m
2008	Central American and Caribbean Championships	Cali, Colombia	10th	Long jump	7.36 m
2008	NACAC U-23 Championships	Toluca, Mexico	3rd	Long jump	7.61m (wind: NWI) A
2008	NACAC U-23 Championships	Toluca, Mexico	5th	4 × 100 m relay	40.87 A
2009	Central American and Caribbean Championships	Havana, Cuba	16th (h)	100 m	10.54
2009	Central American and Caribbean Championships	Havana, Cuba	4th	4 × 100 m relay	39.52
2009	World Championships	Berlin, Germany	—	Long jump	NM
2010	Ibero-American Championships	San Fernando, Spain	16th (h)	100 m	10.72
2010	Ibero-American Championships	San Fernando, Spain	5th	4 × 100 m relay	40.15
2011	Central American and Caribbean Championships	Mayagüez, Puerto Rico	6th	100 m	10.33
2011	Central American and Caribbean Championships	Mayagüez, Puerto Rico	5th	100 m hurdles	13.76
2011	Central American and Caribbean Championships	Mayagüez, Puerto Rico	6th	4 × 100 m relay	40.14
2011	World Championships	Daegu, South Korea	41st (h)	100 m	10.62
2011	Pan American Games	Guadalajara, Mexico	4th	100 m	10.26
2011	Pan American Games	Guadalajara, Mexico	10th (sf)	100 m hurdles	13.80
2012	Olympic Games	London, United Kingdom	42nd (h)	200 m	21.02
2017	IAAF World Relays	Nassau, Bahamas	4th (B)	4 × 100 m relay	39.57
