= Patrina Allen =

Jamaican hurdler

Personal information
- Born: 17 April 1975 (age 51) Kingston, Jamaica

Sport
- Sport: Track and field
- Event: 400 metres hurdles

Patrina Allen (born 17 April 1975) is a Jamaican hurdler. She competed in the 400 metres hurdles at the 2000 Summer Olympics and the 2004 Summer Olympics.

Allen was also a six-time All American for the Miami Hurricanes track and field team, with a best finish of 5th at the 1988 indoor 60 m hurdles and outdoor 400 m hurdles championships.
