= Henry Vizcaíno =

Cuban sprinter

Personal information
- Full name: Henry Máximo Vizcaíno Monteliel
- Born: May 16, 1980 (age 46) Santa Clara, Villa Clara
- Height: 1.76 m (5 ft 9 in)
- Weight: 67 kg (148 lb)

Sport
- Country: Cuba
- Sport: Athletics
- Updated on 21 May 2013

Henry Máximo Vizcaíno Monteliel (born 16 May 1980 in Santa Clara, Villa Clara) is a Cuban sprinter who specializes in the 100 metres. His personal best time over 100 m is 10.18 seconds, achieved in July 2007 in Rio de Janeiro.

== Career ==
He finished eighth in the 60 metres at the 2006 IAAF World Indoor Championships in Moscow. He also competed at the 2007 World Championships, the 2008 World Indoor Championships and the 2008 Olympic Games without reaching the final. However, in Beijing he qualified for the second round after finishing fourth in his heat behind Usain Bolt, Daniel Bailey and Vicente de Lima. His time of 10.28 was the second fastest losing time after the 10.25 of Nobuharu Asahara, advancing them to the second round. In that second round he only came to 10.33 seconds, which was the fifth time of the heat, causing elimination.

== Personal best ==
- 100 m: 10.18 s – (Brazil) Rio de Janeiro, 23 July 2007
- 200 m: 20.91 s – (Colombia) Cali, 5 July 2008

== Competition record ==
Year	Competition	Venue	Position	Event	Notes
Representing Cuba
2005	ALBA Games	La Habana, Cuba	1st	100 m	10.35 s (wind: -0.8 m/s)
2005	ALBA Games	La Habana, Cuba	1st	4 × 100 m relay	40.08 s
2005	Central American and Caribbean Championships	Nassau, Bahamas	4th	100 m	10.20 s (wind: +1.9 m/s)
2005	Central American and Caribbean Championships	Nassau, Bahamas	4th	4 × 100 m relay	39.40 s
2006	World Indoor Championships	Moscow, Russia	8th	60 m	6.84 s
2006	Central American and Caribbean Games	Cartagena, Colombia	12th (sf)	100 m	10.42 s (wind: +2.0 m/s)
2007	ALBA Games	Caracas, Venezuela	2nd	100 m	10.30 s w (wind: +2.3 m/s)
2007	ALBA Games	Caracas, Venezuela	1st	4 × 100 m relay	39.23 s
2007	Pan American Games	Rio de Janeiro, Brazil	4th	100 m	10.31 s (wind: +1.0 m/s)
2007	Pan American Games	Rio de Janeiro, Brazil	5th	4 × 100 m relay	39.46 s
2007	World Championships	Osaka, Japan	28th (qf)	100 m	10.40 s (wind: -0.3 m/s)
2008	World Indoor Championships	Valencia, Spain	22nd (sf)	60 m	6.77 s
2008	Ibero-American Championships	Iquique, Chile	5th	100 m	10.70 s (wind: -2.3 m/s)
2008	Central American and Caribbean Championships	Cali, Colombia	3rd	100 m	10.34 s A (wind: +0.6 m/s)
2008	Central American and Caribbean Championships	Cali, Colombia	14th (sf)	200 m	21.28 s A (wind: +1.1 m/s)
2008	Olympic Games	Beijing, China	30th (qf)	100 m	10.33 s (wind: -0.1 m/s)
2009	ALBA Games	La Habana, Cuba	2nd (h)	100 m	10.79 s (wind: -0.7 m/s)
