= Kimberly Barrett =

Puerto Rican shot putter

Personal information
- Born: 18 November 1981 (age 44) Montego Bay, Saint James Parish, Jamaica

Sport
- Sport: Track and field
- Club: Miami Hurricanes

Kimberly Barrett (born 18 November 1981) is a Puerto Rican shot putter. Her personal best throw is 18.28 metres, achieved in May 2004 in Gainesville, Florida. She originally represented Jamaica. She changed nationality to Puerto Rico in 2006.

Barret first competed for the Florida Gators track and field team. She spent her final year competing for the Miami Hurricanes track and field team, where she won the 2005 NCAA Division I Outdoor Track and Field Championships in the shot put.

For Jamaica she won the bronze medal at the 2005 Central American and Caribbean Championships, and competed at the 2004 Olympic Games and the 2005 World Championships without reaching the final.

== Competition record ==
Year	Competition	Venue	Position	Event	Notes
Representing Jamaica
2004	Olympic Games	Athens, Greece	27th (q)	Shot put	16.45 m
2005	Central American and Caribbean Championships	Nassau, Bahamas	3rd	Shot put	18.03 m
2005	World Championships	Helsinki, Finland	13th (q)	Shot put	17.85 m
Representing Puerto Rico
2011	Central American and Caribbean Championships	Mayagüez, Puerto Rico	6th	Shot put	15.22 m
