= Athletics at the 2007 Pan American Games – Men's 100 metres =

Men's 100 metres at the Pan American Games

The men's 100 metres event at the 2007 Pan American Games was held on July 23–24.

== Medalists ==
Gold	Silver	Bronze
Churandy Martina; Netherlands Antilles	Darvis Patton; United States	Brendan Christian; Antigua and Barbuda

== Results ==
=== Heats ===
Qualification: First 3 of each heat (Q) and the next 4 fastest (q) qualified for the semifinals.

Wind:
Heat 1: +1.6 m/s, Heat 2: +0.6 m/s, Heat 3: +1.5 m/s, Heat 4: +1.5 m/s

Rank	Heat	Name	Nationality	Time	Notes
1	1	Churandy Martina	Netherlands Antilles	10.15	Q
2	1	Jenris Vizcaino	Cuba	10.18	Q, SB
3	4	Keston Bledman	Trinidad and Tobago	10.19	Q
4	4	Vicente de Lima	Brazil	10.23	Q
5	1	Kim Collins	Saint Kitts and Nevis	10.30	Q, SB
6	4	Kael Becerra	Chile	10.32	Q
7	2	Brendan Christian	Antigua and Barbuda	10.34	Q
8	3	Darvis Patton	United States	10.35	Q
9	2	Anson Henry	Canada	10.37	Q
10	4	Rolando Palacios	Honduras	10.38	q, PB
11	3	Franklin Nazareno	Ecuador	10.39	Q
11	1	Rafael Ribeiro	Brazil	10.39	q
13	2	J-Mee Samuels	United States	10.41	Q
14	4	Daniel Bailey	Antigua and Barbuda	10.46	q
15	3	Delwayne Delaney	Saint Kitts and Nevis	10.47	Q
16	1	Xavier Brown	Jamaica	10.50	q
17	1	Adrian Griffith	Bahamas	10.56	
17	2	Yoan Frías	Cuba	10.56	SB
17	3	Brian Mariano	Netherlands Antilles	10.56	
20	4	Jorge Luis Solórzano	Guatemala	10.63	
21	4	Jason Livermore	Jamaica	10.86	
22	3	Lionel Jones	Belize	10.94	
23	2	Joel Báez	Dominican Republic	10.99	
24	2	José Garaventa	Argentina	11.09	
25	3	Jurgen Themen	Suriname	11.13	
26	2	Richard Thompson	Trinidad and Tobago	12.06	
27	1	Nicolas Lopez Moreira	Paraguay	42.08	
	1	Michael LeBlanc	Canada	DNS	
	3	Kareem Streete-Thompson	Cayman Islands	DNS	

=== Semifinals ===
Qualification: First 4 of each semifinal (Q) qualified directly for the final.

Wind:
Heat 1: +0.1 m/s, Heat 2: -0.5 m/s

Rank	Heat	Name	Nationality	Time	Notes
1	1	Churandy Martina	Netherlands Antilles	10.06	Q, =GR
2	2	Darvis Patton	United States	10.21	Q
3	2	Brendan Christian	Antigua and Barbuda	10.24	Q, SB
4	2	Jenris Vizcaino	Cuba	10.30	Q
5	2	Vicente de Lima	Brazil	10.31	Q
6	1	J-Mee Samuels	United States	10.31	Q
7	1	Kim Collins	Saint Kitts and Nevis	10.32	Q
8	1	Anson Henry	Canada	10.32	Q
9	1	Keston Bledman	Trinidad and Tobago	10.34	
10	1	Rafael Ribeiro	Brazil	10.39	
11	2	Delwayne Delaney	Saint Kitts and Nevis	10.42	
12	2	Kael Becerra	Chile	10.43	
13	1	Franklin Nazareno	Ecuador	10.44	
14	2	Rolando Palacios	Honduras	10.48	
15	2	Xavier Brown	Jamaica	10.61	
	1	Daniel Bailey	Antigua and Barbuda	DNF	

=== Final ===
Wind: +1.0 m/s

Rank	Lane	Name	Nationality	Time	Notes
1st place, gold medalist(s)	4	Churandy Martina	Netherlands Antilles	10.15	
2nd place, silver medalist(s)	5	Darvis Patton	United States	10.17	
3rd place, bronze medalist(s)	6	Brendan Christian	Antigua and Barbuda	10.26	
4	2	Jenris Vizcaino	Cuba	10.31	
5	7	Kim Collins	Saint Kitts and Nevis	10.31	
6	3	J-Mee Samuels	United States	10.33	
7	1	Vicente de Lima	Brazil	10.37	
7	8	Anson Henry	Canada	10.38	
