= Adam Rosenke =

Canadian bobsledder (born 1984)

Adam Rosenke (born July 8, 1984, in Edmonton, Alberta) is a Canadian bobsledder whom competed from 2008 to 2013. After a successful track and field career, Rosenke transitioned into bobsled, competing on the World Cup circuit for 3 seasons.

== Career ==
Rosenke was a Lyndon Rush and Christopher Spring team member on the World Cup Bobsleigh circuit in 2008-09 and 2012–13. He has a sprinting background at the University of Alberta and placed 5th at nationals in 2008, after spending a year at the University of Louisiana-Monroe on a full track and field scholarship. Rosenke now considers himself a retired athlete and operates a successful family law practice in Calgary, Canada. At age 36, he has yet to rule out a comeback to competitive athletics.
