= Derrick Atkins =

Bahamian sprinter (born 1984)

Personal information
- Nationality: The Bahamas
- Born: 5 January 1984 (age 42) Jamaica
- Height: 1.85 m (6 ft 1 in)

Sport
- Sport: Running
- Event(s): 100 metres, 200 metres

Achievements and titles
- Personal best(s): 100m: 9.91 s (Osaka 2007); 200m: 20.35 s (Athens 2009)
Medal record
Men's athletics
Representing Bahamas
World Championships
| Silver medal – second place | 2007 Osaka | 100 m |
Central American and Caribbean Games
| Silver medal – second place | 2006 Cartagena | 100 m |
| Silver medal – second place | 2006 Cartagena | 4×100 m relay |
CAC Championships
| Silver medal – second place | 2008 Cali | 4x100 m relay |
| Bronze medal – third place | 2005 Nassau | 4x100 m relay |
| Bronze medal – third place | 2009 Havana | 4x100 m relay |

Derrick Atkins (born 5 January 1984) is a Bahamian sprinter. Atkins specializes in the 100 metres event and also holds the national record, with a time of 9.91 seconds. He is the second cousin of former world record holder Asafa Powell.

Atkins is now a head coach for the women's Track and field team at Utah Tech University, formerly known as Dixie State University.

== University ==
While attending Dickinson State University in Dickinson, North Dakota, Atkins was a 3 time National Association of Intercollegiate Athletics (NAIA) national champion in the 100 meter dash, 2 times national champion in the 200 meter dash and also 2 times national champion in the 55m meter dash indoor. He helped lead those DSU track teams to back-to-back national team titles. He was also inducted into the National Association of Intercollegiate Athletics (NAIA) Hall of fame in Track and field 2013 class.

== Career ==
=== 2005 ===
Atkins participated at the 2005 World Championships but failed to progress past the first round.

With the Bahamian 4 x 100 metres relay team he finished fourth at the 2003 Central American and Caribbean Championships and won a bronze medal at the 2005 Central American and Caribbean Championships.

=== 2006 ===
At the 2006 Central American and Caribbean Games, Atkins won the silver medal, having established a national record of 10.08 seconds during the heats.

=== 2007 ===
On 28 April 2007 in Berkeley, California, Atkins again lowered the national record, to 9.98 seconds. He also ran 9.86 s and 9.83 s, though with tail winds of 2.3 and 2.4 m/s.

On 26 August 2007 at the 2007 World Championships, Atkins came second with a national record time of 9.91s (wind speed -0.5 m/s). The event was won by Tyson Gay who ran 9.85 s. Atkins beat the world record holder and favorite for the event, Asafa Powell who ran 9.96 seconds.

=== 2008 ===
Atkins represented the Bahamas at the 2008 Summer Olympics in Beijing where he competed at the 100 metres sprint and placed 1st in his heat in a time of 10.28 seconds in front of Andrey Yepishin and Jaysuma Saidy Ndure. In the second round he improved his time to 10.14 seconds, finishing third in his heat behind Asafa Powell and Walter Dix, qualifying for the semi-finals. There a 10.13 seconds race was unable to bring him in the final, finishing in sixth place of his semi final.

=== 2012 ===
Atkins represented the Bahamas at the 2012 Summer Olympics in London where he competed at the 100 metres sprint and placed 4th in his semi finals in a time of 10.08.

=== 2013 ===
Derrick Atkins was inducted in the National Association of Intercollegiate Athletics NAIA Hall of fame, His College career includes 3 Team National Track and field Championships, 7 time individual National champion, 15 National NAIA All-American Honors, 9 times DAC-10 All Conference Honors and Dickinson State University Male Athlete of the year.
