= Darian Forbes =

Darian Forbes (born 3 May 1984) is a sprinter from Turks and Caicos Islands who specializes in the 200 metres.

== Early life ==
Grew up in Grand Turk, Turks and Caicos Islands. He became the top sprinter throughout Inter-High, Inter-School, Annual Relays Competitions, competing for the H.J. Robinson High School.

After graduating he went to college to further his athletic passion.

== Athletic career ==
He participated at the 2002 World Junior Championships, the 2003 World Championships and the 2006 Commonwealth Games.

His personal best times:

(Outdoor) 100m - 10.46 seconds on 15 May 2005 in St. Charles, Missouri; 200m - 21.05 seconds on 8 July 2006 in Santo Domingo

(Indoor) 60m - 6.97 seconds on 6 February 2004 in Warrensburg, MO; 200m - 21.86 seconds on 10 March 2006 in Roxbury, MA; 400m - 50.12 seconds on 3 February 2006 in Bloomington, IN

== Personal life ==
Darian Forbes teaches as a sports teacher at the Enid Capron Primary School. Darian Forbes is now a Facility Manager at the TCI Sports Commission.
