= Félix Martínez (athlete) =

Puerto Rican sprinter

Personal information
- Full name: Félix Adolfo Martínez Cuevas
- Nationality: Puerto Rico
- Born: 4 February 1985 (age 41)
- Height: 1.85 m (6 ft 1 in)
- Weight: 75 kg (165 lb)

Sport
- Sport: Athletics
- Event: Sprint

Achievements and titles
- Personal best(s): 200 m: 21.09 s (2004); 200 m: 20.93 s (2007); 400 m: 45.92 s (2007)

Félix Adolfo Martínez Cuevas (born February 4, 1985) is a Puerto Rican sprinter, who specialized in the 400 metres. He set both a national record and a personal best time of 45.92 seconds by finishing third for the 400 metres at the 2007 Ponce Grand Prix (NACAC Permit) in Ponce.

Martínez represented his nation Puerto Rico at the 2008 Summer Olympics in Beijing, where he competed for the men's 400 metres. He ran in the sixth heat against seven other athletes, including Trinidad and Tobago's Renny Quow and Bahamas' Michael Mathieu. He finished the race in seventh place by sixteen hundredths of a second (0.16) behind Grenada's Joel Phillip, outside his personal best time of 46.46 seconds. Martínez, however, failed to advance into the semi-finals, as he placed forty-fourth overall, and was ranked farther below three mandatory slots for the next round.
