= Ginou Etienne =

Haitian sprinter

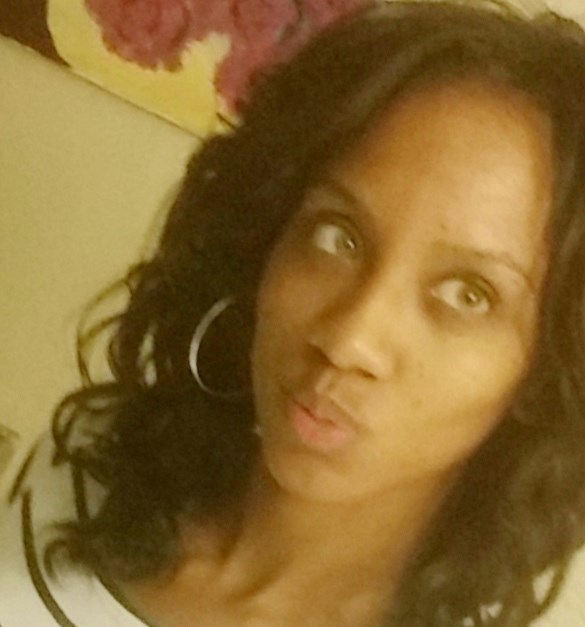
- Etienne in 2015

Personal information
- Born: 12 January 1985 (age 40) Miami, Florida, United States

Sport
- Sport: Track and field
- Club: Miami Hurricanes

Ginou Etienne (born 12 January 1985) is a track and field athlete who specialises in the 400 metres. She has competed both for the Miami Hurricanes track and field team and internationally on Haiti's behalf. Etienne was one of seven Haitian athletes who competed at the 2008 Summer Olympics. She also competed at the 2007 World Championships in Athletics.
