= Tabia Charles =

Canadian long jumper (born 1985)

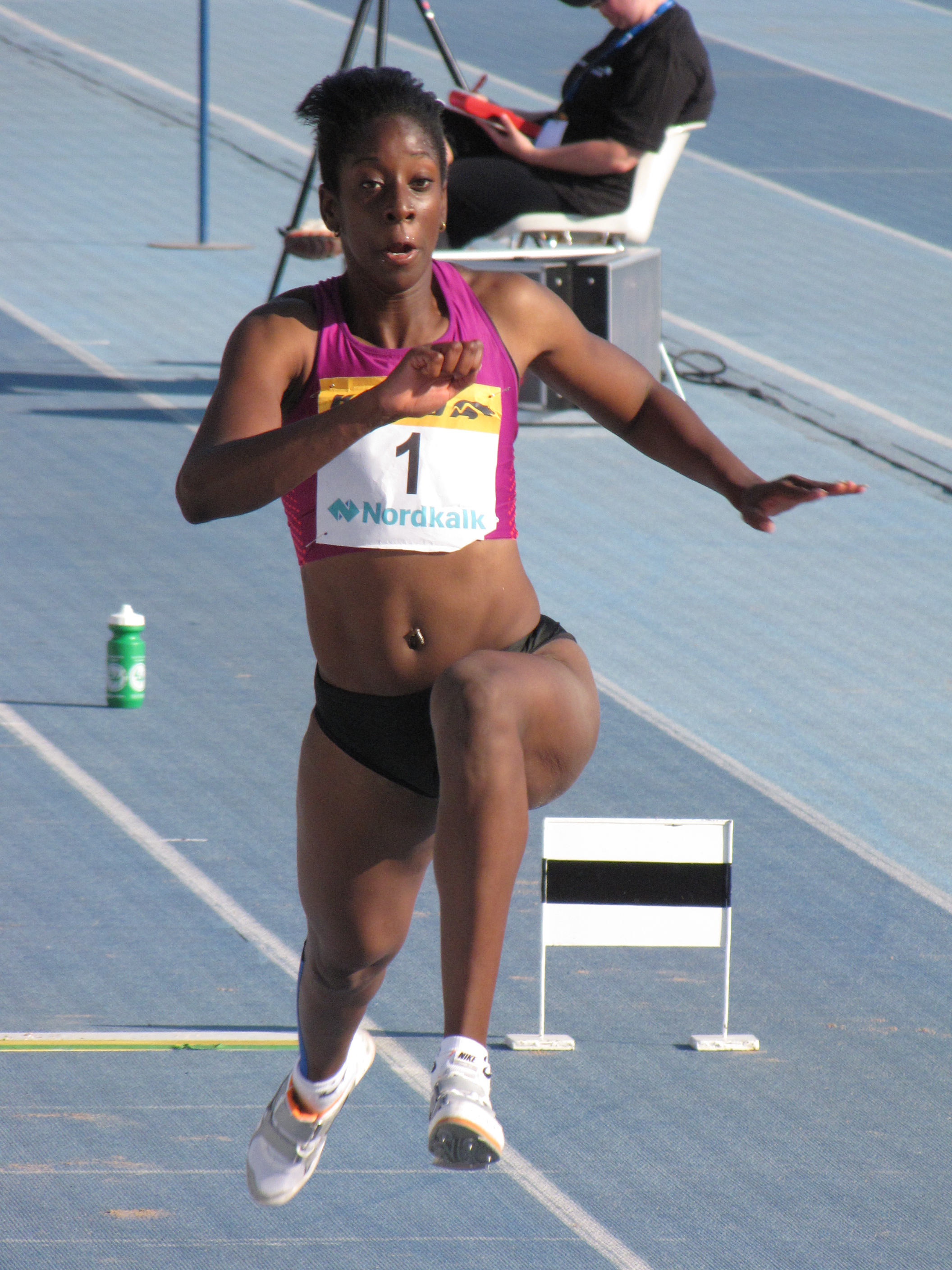

Personal information
- Born: 6 April 1985 (age 41) Toronto, Ontario, Canada
- Height: 5 ft 10 in (1.78 m)
- Weight: 148 lb (67 kg)

Sport
- Country: Canada
- Sport: Long jump

Achievements and titles
- Personal bests: Long jump: 6.82 m NR, Chania, 2008; Triple jump: 13.99 m NR, Eugene, 2010

Tabia Charles (born 6 April 1985 in Toronto, Ontario, Canada) is a Canadian long jumper.

She finished tenth in the final round at the 2008 Olympic Games.

Her personal best is 6.82 metres, achieved in June 2008 in Chania. This is the current Canadian record. She also has 14.02 metres in the triple jump, achieved in March 2007 in South Bend; her outdoor personal best is 13.94 metres, achieved in April 2006 in Philadelphia.

On October 4, 2018, The University of Miami announced that Tabia Charles-Collins will be one of eight athletes inducted into the Sports Hall of Fame as part of its 51st Annual ceremony. The Class of 2019 ceremony is set to take place in April 2019.

Charles is the cousin of Antigua and Barbuda sprinter Ruperta Charles and is also related to Afia Charles and Kaila Charles.
