= Athletics at the ALBA Games =

Athletics competitions have been held at the biennial ALBA Games since the inaugural edition 2005 in Havana, Cuba. The Games are not only open for the member federations of the ALBA, but also for athletes from other nations.

== Editions ==
The host cities were published.

Games	Year	Host city	Country	Events	
Games	Year	Host city	Country	Men	Women
I	2005	Havana	Cuba	22	21
II	2007	Caracas	Venezuela	23	23
III	2009	Havana	Cuba	22	22
IV	2011	Barquisimeto	Venezuela	22	21
–	2013	Quito	Ecuador		
–	2015	Cochabamba	Bolivia		
V	2023		Venezuela		

== Records ==
The list is compiled from the published results lists.

=== Men ===
Event	Record	Athlete	Nationality	Date	Meet	Place	Notes
100 m	10.16 (+1.3 m/s)	Michael Herrera	Cuba	23 April 2009	2009 Games	Havana, Cuba	
200 m	20.31 (+2.0 m/s)	Michael Herrera	Cuba	10 May 2007	2007 Games	Caracas, Venezuela	
200 m	20.27w (+2.6 m/s)	Roberto Skyers	Cuba	24 April 2009	2009 Games	Havana, Cuba	
400 m	45.53	Noel Ruíz	Cuba	27 July 2011	2011 Games	Barquisimeto, Venezuela	
800 m	1:45.00	Yeimer López	Cuba	24 April 2009	2009 Games	Havana, Cuba	
1500 m	3:42.43	Maury Surel Castillo	Cuba	9 May 2007	2007 Games	Caracas, Venezuela	
5000 m	14:03.13	Byron Piedra	Ecuador	25 April 2009	2009 Games	Havana, Cuba	
10,000 m	30:14.33	Aguelmis Rojas	Cuba	9 May 2007	2007 Games	Caracas, Venezuela	
Half marathon	1:06:30.94	Henry Jaens	Cuba	30 July 2011	2011 Games	Barquisimeto, Venezuela	
3000 m steeplechase	8:40.87	José Alberto Sánchez	Cuba	24 April 2009	2009 Games	Havana, Cuba	
110 m hurdles	13.58 (+1.3 m/s)	Yuniel Hernández	Cuba	28 July 2011	2011 Games	Barquisimeto, Venezuela	
400 m hurdles	49.49	Omar Cisneros	Cuba	24 April 2009	2009 Games	Havana, Cuba	
High jump	2.31 m	Víctor Moya	Cuba	9 May 2007	2007 Games	Caracas, Venezuela	
Pole vault	5.20 m	Lázaro Borges	Cuba	24 April 2009	2009 Games	Havana, Cuba	
Long jump	8.17 m (+0.9 m/s)	Wilfredo Martínez	Cuba	11 May 2007	2007 Games	Caracas, Venezuela	
Triple jump	17.65 m (+1.4 m/s)	Yoandri Betanzos	Cuba	25 April 2009	2009 Games	Havana, Cuba	
Triple jump	17.69 m w (+3.9 m/s)	Alexis Copello	Cuba	25 April 2009	2009 Games	Havana, Cuba	
Shot put	19.54 m	Carlos Véliz	Cuba	10 May 2007	2007 Games	Caracas, Venezuela	
Discus throw	61.61 m	Jorge Fernández	Cuba	23 April 2009	2009 Games	Havana, Cuba	
Hammer throw	72.18 m	Erik Jiménez	Cuba	23 June 2005	2005 Games	Havana, Cuba	
Javelin	83.02 m (Current design)	Guillermo Martínez	Cuba	10 May 2007	2007 Games	Caracas, Venezuela	
Decathlon	7800 pts	Júnior Díaz	Cuba	27–28 July 2011	2011 Games	Barquisimeto, Venezuela	
Decathlon	100m / Long jump / Shot put / High jump / 400m / 110m H / Discus / Pole vault / Javelin / 1500m; 10.84 (+2.1 m/s) / 7.54 m (+1.0 m/s) / 14.41 m / 1.99 m / 47.58 / 14.99 (+1.1 m/s) / 43.55 m / 4.40 m / 55.03 m / 5:10.84						
20 km walk (road)	1:28:20.13	Rolando Saquipay	Ecuador	27 July 2011	2011 Games	Barquisimeto, Venezuela	
4 × 100 m relay	39.23	David Lescay; Yoel Hernández; Michael Herrera; Henry Vizcaíno	Cuba	9 May 2007	2007 Games	Caracas, Venezuela	
4 × 400 m relay	3:04.91	Omar Longart; Alberto Aguilar; José Acevedo; Arturo Ramírez	Venezuela	29 July 2011	2011 Games	Barquisimeto, Venezuela	

=== Women ===
Event	Record	Athlete	Nationality	Date	Meet	Notes
100 metres	11.33 s (−3.9 m/s)	Virgen Benavides	Cuba	23 April 2009	Havana, Cuba	
200 metres	22.97 s	Nelkis Casabona	Cuba	29 July 2011	Barquisimeto, Venezuela	
400 metres	51.79 s	Indira Terrero	Cuba	23 April 2009	Havana, Cuba	
800 metres	2:02.55 min	Adriana Muñoz	Cuba	29 July 2011	Barquisimeto, Venezuela	
1500 metres	4:23.28 min	Adriana Muñoz	Cuba	27 July 2011	Barquisimeto, Venezuela	
5000 metres	16:24.82 min	Yudelkis Martínez	Cuba	24 June 2005	Havana, Cuba	
10,000 metres	34:36.2 min	Yudileyvis Castillo	Cuba	23 April 2009	Havana, Cuba	
Half marathon	1:14:45.84 min	Dailín Belmonte	Cuba	30 July 2011	Barquisimeto, Cuba	
3000 m steeplechase	10:23.14 min	Milena Pérez	Cuba	25 April 2009	Havana, Cuba	
100 m hurdles	12.98 s (−3.3 m/s)	Anay Tejeda	Cuba	23 April 2009	Havana, Cuba	
400 m hurdles	56.98 s	Daimí Pernía	Cuba	10 May 2007	Caracas, Venezuela	
High jump	1.87 m	Yarianny Argüelles	Cuba	23 June 2005	Havana, Cuba	
Pole vault	4.15 m	Yarisley Silva	Cuba	10 May 2007	Caracas, Venezuela	
Long jump	6.60 m (+0.0 m/s)	Yargelis Savigne	Cuba	9 May 2007	Caracas, Venezuela	
Triple jump	14.99 m	Yargelis Savigne	Cuba	11 May 2007	Caracas, Venezuela	
Shot put	18.77 m	Mailín Vargas	Cuba	27 July 2011	Barquisimeto, Cuba	
Discus	64.18 m	Yania Ferrales	Cuba	9 May 2007	Caracas, Venezuela	
Hammer	70.66 m	Yunaika Crawford	Cuba	25 April 2009	Havana, Cuba	
Javelin	59.95 m (Current design)	María de la Caridad Álvarez	Cuba	10 May 2007	Caracas, Venezuela	
Heptathlon	6076 pts	Gretchen Quintana	Cuba	10/11 May 2007	Caracas, Venezuela	
Heptathlon	100m H / High jump / Shot put / 200m / Long jump / Javelin / 800m; 13.65 (+0.0 m/s) / 1.74 m / 13.53 m / 24.32 / 6.36 m (+1.2 m/s) / 34.05 m / 2:13.34					
10 km walk (road)	46:19 min	Yanelis Conte	Cuba	24 April 2009	Havana, Cuba	
20 km walk (road)	1:38:15 hrs	Leisy Rodríguez	Cuba	10 May 2007	Caracas, Venezuela	
4 × 100 m relay	43.86 s	Virgen Benavides; Roxana Díaz; Misleidys Lazo; Aymée Martínez	Cuba	11 May 2007	Caracas, Venezuela	
4 × 400 m relay	3:34.91 min	Aymée Martínez; Diosmely Peña; Susana Clement; Daysurami Bonne	Cuba	29 July 2011	Barquisimeto, Venezuela	
