= Athletics at the 2009 ALBA Games =

Athletics at the III ALBA Games
- Dates: April 23–25
- Host city: La Habana, Cuba
- Venue: Estadio Panamericano
- Level: Senior
- Events: 44 (22 men, 22 women)

Athletics competitions at the 2009 ALBA Games were held at the Estadio Panamericano in La Habana, Cuba, between April 23–25, 2009.

A total of 44 events were contested, 22 by men and 22 by women.

== Medal summary ==
Medal winners and their results were published. Complete results can be found on the FEDACHI webpage.

=== Men ===
Event	Gold		Silver		Bronze	
100 metres (wind: +1.3 m/s)	Michael Herrera (CUB)	10.16	Franklin Nazareno (ECU)	10.39	Víctor Angel González (CUB)	10.46
200 metres (wind: +2.3 m/s)	Roberto Skyers (CUB)	20.27 w	Franklin Nazareno (ECU)	21.08 w	Jorge Valcárcel (CUB)	21.12 w
400 metres	William Collazo (CUB)	45.74	Noel Ruíz (CUB)	46.26	Said Boni (VEN)	47.44
800 metres	Yeimer López (CUB)	1:45.00	Raidel Acea (CUB)	1:47.51	Eduard Villanueva (VEN)	1:48.01
1500 metres	Maury Surel Castillo (CUB)	3:44.12	Bayron Piedra (ECU)	3:44.74	Eduard Villanueva (VEN)	3:45.47
5000 metres	Bayron Piedra (ECU)	14:03.13	Maury Surel Castillo (CUB)	14:21.29	Liván Luque (CUB)	14:22.55
10,000 metres	Liván Luque (CUB)	30:25.07	Miguel Almachi (ECU)	30:28.32	Henry Jaens (CUB)	30:32.30
3000 metres steeplechase	José Alberto Sánchez (CUB)	8:40.87	José Peña (VEN)	8:44.47	Osmany Calzado (CUB)	9:03.24
110 metres hurdles (wind: +0.9 m/s)	Dayron Capetillo (CUB)	13.61	Yuniel Hernández (CUB)	13.80	Ignacio Morales (CUB)	13.85
400 metres hurdles	Omar Cisneros (CUB)	49.49	Yasmani Copello (CUB)	50.13	Víctor Solarte (VEN)	51.07
High jump	Albert Bravo (VEN)	2.15	Raudelis Rodríguez (CUB)	2.10	James Grayman (ATG)	2.10
Pole vault	Lázaro Borges (CUB)	5.20	Gilberto Cabrera (CUB)	4.80	Yanquier Lara (CUB)	4.40
Long jump	Ibrain Camejo (CUB)	8.14 w (wind: +5.0 m/s)	Wilfredo Martínez (CUB)	8.05 w (wind: +4.2 m/s)	Oslay Vilches (CUB)	7.72 w (wind: +5.4 m/s)
Triple jump	Alexis Copello (CUB)	17.69 w (wind: +3.9 m/s)	Yoandri Betanzos (CUB)	17.65 (wind: +1.4 m/s)	Arnie David Giralt (CUB)	17.62 (wind: -0.2 m/s)
Shot put	Reinaldo Proenza (CUB)	19.37	Carlos Véliz (CUB)	19.28	Aldo Luis González (BOL)	16.39
Discus throw	Jorge Fernández (CUB)	61.61	Yunio Lastre (CUB)	60.06	Jesús Parejo (VEN)	56.44
Hammer throw	Noleisis Bicet (CUB)	70.88	Roberto Janet (CUB)	70.66	Robero Eduardo Sáez (CHI)	66.99
Javelin throw	Guillermo Martínez (CUB)	80.14	Jesús García (VEN)	69.34	Yudel Moreno (CUB)	69.28
Decathlon	Yosley Azcuy (CUB)	7326	William Valor (VEN)	7172	Juan Gilberto Alcázar (CUB)	6805
20 Kilometres Road Walk	Ricardo Loján (ECU)	1:30:04	Yurbraile Hernández (CUB)	1:30:30	Wilman Vera (VEN)	1:35:32
4 × 100 metres relay	Cuba; Michael Herrera; Roberto Skyers; Yuniel Hernández; Víctor Angel González	39.77	Ecuador; John Tamayo; Hugo Chila; Franklin Nazareno; Álex Quiñónez	40.67	Cuba; Reinier Valdés; Jenris Vizcaíno; Jorge Valcárcel; Raiko Suárez	41.03
4 × 400 metres relay	Cuba; Noel Ruíz; Víctor Angel González; Omar Cisneros; Yasmani Copello	3:08.17	Venezuela; Omar Longart; Said Boni; Freddy Mezones; Rubén Headly	3:10.04	Cuba; Miguel Laugart; Arniel Osorio; Raidel Acea; Jorge Valcárcel	3:14.19

=== Women ===
Event	Gold		Silver		Bronze	
100 metres (wind: +3.9 m/s)	Virgen Benavides (CUB)	11.33 w	Dayneris Bience (CUB)	11.61 w	Anisleidis Luis (CUB)	11.78 w
200 metres (wind: +0.7 m/s)	Roxana Díaz (CUB)	23.31	Nelkis Casabona (CUB)	23.83	Nancy Garcés (VEN)	24.91
400 metres	Indira Terrero (CUB)	51.79	Daysurami Bonne (CUB)	53.19	Yaneisi Borlot (CUB)	55.43
800 metres	Zulia Calatayud (CUB)	2:05.58	Diosmely Peña (CUB)	2:06.74	Yanelis Lara (CUB)	2:06.84
1500 metres	Yadira Bataille (CUB)	4:25.92	María Osorio (VEN)	4:28.31	Viviana Acosta (ECU)	4:29.51
5000 metres	Yudileyvis Castillo (CUB)	16:27.1	Yudisleidis Fuente (CUB)	16:42.6	Viviana Acosta (ECU)	17:14.8
10,000 metres	Yudileyvis Castillo (CUB)	34:36.2	Yudisleidis Fuente (CUB)	34:59.1	Rosa Chacha (ECU)	35:58.8
3000 metres steeplechase	Milena Pérez (CUB)	10:23.14	Yoslín Ocampo (CUB)	10:25.22	Rosmery Alfonso (CUB)	11:43.59
100 metres hurdles (wind: +3.3 m/s)	Anay Tejeda (CUB)	12.98	Yenima Arencibia (CUB)	13.10	Belkis Milanés (CUB)	13.38
400 metres hurdles	Yadisleidy Pedroso (CUB)	58.23	Dayani Lara (CUB)	58.35	Yisel Velazco (CUB)	59.09
High jump	Lesyaní Mayor (CUB)	1.84	Nulfa Palacios (COL)	1.60	Kirenia Pedro (CUB)	1.55
Pole vault	Dailis Caballero (CUB)	4.00	Maryoris Sánchez (CUB)	3.90	Irusneidis Cobas (CUB)	3.60
Long jump	Dailenis Alcántara (CUB)	6.33 (wind: +0.5 m/s)	Verónica Davis (VEN)	5.98 w (wind: +3.7 m/s)	Lorena Mina (ECU)	5.95 w (wind: +5.5 m/s)
Triple jump	Yargelis Savigne (CUB)	14.70 (wind: -0.8 m/s)	Mabel Gay (CUB)	14.52 w (wind: +3.0 m/s)	Yarianna Martínez (CUB)	14.34 w (wind: +3.3 m/s)
Shot put	Mailín Vargas (CUB)	18.62	Yaniuvis López (CUB)	18.47	Misleydis González (CUB)	18.41
Discus throw	Yarisley Collado (CUB)	63.86	Yarelis Barrios (CUB)	63.24	Karen Gallardo (CHI)	57.48
Hammer throw	Yunaika Crawford (CUB)	70.66	Arasay Thondike (CUB)	68.89	Amélie Perrin (FRA)	66.86
Javelin throw	Yanet Cruz (CUB)	59.47	Osleidys Menéndez (CUB)	58.09	Yainelis Ribeaux (CUB)	55.65
Heptathlon	Yusleydis Limonta (CUB)	5326	Macarena Reyes (CHI)	5322	Lisandra Carrión (CUB)	5102
10 Kilometres Road Walk	Yanelis Conte (CUB)	46:19	Leisis Rodríguez (CUB)	46:23	Milanggela Rosales (VEN)	47:49
4 × 100 metres relay	Cuba; Virgen Benavides; Nelkis Casabona; Dayneris Bience; Anisleidis Luis	44.93	Venezuela; Jesika Bermúdez; Patricia Blanco; Prisciliana Chourio; Nancy Garcés	46.26	Cuba; Ediagne Santana; Yaneisis Riveaux; Yilian Durruthy; Indira Torres	46.55
4 × 400 metres relay	Cuba; Zulia Calatayud; Dayani Lara; Diosmely Peña; Daysurami Bonne	3:35.04	Cuba; Cheilín Povea; Yaneisi Borlot; Yaneisis Riveaux; Yanelis Lara	3:40.42	Ecuador; Liliana Núñez; María Corozo; Erika Chávez; Lucy Jaramillo	3:45.70

== Medal table (unofficial) ==
* Host nation (Cuba)

Rank	Nation	Gold	Silver	Bronze	Total
1	Cuba*	41	30	26	97
2	Ecuador	2	5	5	12
3	Venezuela	1	7	8	16
4	Chile	0	1	2	3
5	Colombia	0	1	0	1
6	Bolivia	0	0	1	1
6	France	0	0	1	1
6	Netherlands Antilles	0	0	1	1
Totals (8 entries)		44	44	44	132

== Participation (unofficial) ==
An unofficial count yields the participation of athletes from the following 9 countries:

- Antigua and Barbuda
- Bolivia
- Chile
- Colombia
- Cuba
- Ecuador
- France
- (Mexico) México
- Venezuela

Cuban athletes were distributed over different teams Cuba, Cuba B, Cuba C, and Cuba D. In addition, there were a number of athletes competing as EIEFD. Some of them were tentatively assigned to the following countries (incomplete):

- Barbados
- Botswana
- Guatemala
- (Panama) Panamá
- Saint Vincent and the Grenadines
- Sri Lanka
