= Michael Herrera =

Cuban sprinter (born 1985)

Personal information
- Full name: Michael Herrera Flores
- Born: 5 June 1985 (age 41) Los Palacios, Pinar del Río, Cuba
- Height: 1.78 m (5 ft 10 in)
- Weight: 70 kg (154 lb)

Sport
- Country: Cuba
- Sport: Athletics
- Updated on 4 June 2013

Michael Herrera (born 5 June 1985) is a Cuban track and field sprinter who specialises in the 200 metres. He has a personal best of 20.31 seconds for the event and has also recorded 10.16 seconds for the 100 metres. He was a semi-finalist at the 2011 World Championships in Athletics and has represented Cuba at the Pan American Games in 2007 and 2011.

== Biography ==
Born in Los Palacios, Pinar del Río, he began competing at the senior level in 2005 and finished third in both the 100 m and 200 m at the Cuban Championships that year. He won the 200 m and the 4×100 metres relay at the 2005 ALBA Games. He was selected for these events at the 2005 Central American and Caribbean Championships and came sixth and fourth, respectively. He won the 200 m at the Barrientos Memorial in 2006. He reached the semi-finals of both the sprints at the 2006 NACAC Under-23 Championships in Athletics. At the 2006 CAC Games he helped the relay team to fourth (running alongside Yoel Hernández and Dayron Robles) and was a 200 m semi-finalist.

Herrera defended both his titles at the 2007 ALBA Games in Caracas and ran a personal best of 20.31 seconds. He was a finalist in the 200 m at the 2007 Pan American Games and helped the relay team reach the final. He only had a season's best of 20.81 seconds in 2008 and did not compete internationally. Herrera switched his focus to the 100 m event in the 2009 season and was rewarded with a personal best of 10.16 seconds, wins at the Barrientos Memorial and the 2009 ALBA Games. He placed seventh in the final at the 2009 CAC Championships.

A quiet 2010 was highlighted by a 100 m win at the Barrientos Memorial with a hand-timed 9.7 seconds. He began doubling up in the sprint events for the 2011 season and won both events at the Barrientos meet. He won silver medals in both events at the 2011 ALBA Games and helped Cuba take the relay title. His season's best of 20.52 seconds for the 200 m was enough for a place on the Cuban team for the 2011 World Championships in Athletics and ended the competition in fourth in the semi-finals. He was also selected for the 2011 Pan American Games and was a semi-finalist in both the individual sprints, as well as running Cuba to fourth in the relay final with Roberto Skyers. In 2012 he placed fifth in the 200 m at the Ibero-American Championships, and a run of 20.64 seconds in Havana gained him a place in the Cuban squad for the 2012 London Olympics.

== Personal best ==
- 100 m: 10.16 s (wind: -1.3 m/s) – Havana, Cuba, 23 April 2009
- 200 m: 20.31 s (wind: +2.0 m/s) – Caracas, Venezuela, 11 May 2007

== Achievements ==
Year	Competition	Venue	Position	Event	Notes
Representing Cuba
2005	ALBA Games	Havana, Cuba	1st	200 m	20.98 s (wind: +0.0 m/s)
2005	ALBA Games	Havana, Cuba	1st	4 × 100 m relay	40.08 s
2005	Central American and Caribbean Championships	Nassau, Bahamas	6th	200 m	20.91 s (wind: +1.9 m/s)
2005	Central American and Caribbean Championships	Nassau, Bahamas	4th	4 × 100 m relay	39.40 s
2006	NACAC U-23 Championships	Santo Domingo, Dominican Republic	12th (sf)	100m	10.66 (wind: +0.7 m/s)
2006	NACAC U-23 Championships	Santo Domingo, Dominican Republic	3rd (h)	200m	21.21(wind: +1.3 m/s)
2006	Central American and Caribbean Games	Cartagena, Colombia	12th (sf)	200 m	21.15 s (wind: -0.1 m/s)
2006	Central American and Caribbean Games	Cartagena, Colombia	4th	4 × 100 m relay	39.63 s
2007	ALBA Games	Caracas, Venezuela	1st	200 m	20.31 s (wind: +2.0 m/s)
2007	ALBA Games	Caracas, Venezuela	1st	4 × 100 m relay	39.23 s
2007	Pan American Games	Rio de Janeiro, Brazil	5th (sf)	200 m	20.74 s (wind: +0.7 m/s)
2007	Pan American Games	Rio de Janeiro, Brazil	6th (h)	4 × 100 m relay	39.54 s
2009	ALBA Games	Havana, Cuba	1st	100 m	10.16 s (wind: -1.3 m/s)
2009	ALBA Games	Havana, Cuba	1st	4 × 100 m relay	39.77 s
2009	Central American and Caribbean Championships	Havana, Cuba	7th	100 m	10.31 s (wind: +0.9 m/s)
2011	ALBA Games	Barquisimeto, Venezuela	2nd	100 m	10.35 s (wind: +0.1 m/s)
2011	ALBA Games	Barquisimeto, Venezuela	2nd	200 m	20.67 s w (wind: +2.4 m/s)
2011	ALBA Games	Barquisimeto, Venezuela	1st	4 × 100 m relay	39.34 s
2011	World Championships	Daegu, South Korea	13th (sf)	200 m	20.75 s (wind: -0.7 m/s)
2011	Pan American Games	Guadalajara, Mexico	13th (sf)	100 m	10.52 s (wind: -1.9 m/s)
2011	Pan American Games	Guadalajara, Mexico	8th (sf)	200 m	20.66 s (wind: +0.5 m/s)
2011	Pan American Games	Guadalajara, Mexico	4th	4 × 100 m relay	39.75 s
2012	Ibero-American Championships	Barquisimeto, Venezuela	5th	200 m	20.78 s (wind: -0.9 m/s)
2012	Olympic Games	London, United Kingdom	6th (h)	200 m	21.05 s
