= Athletics at the 2005 ALBA Games =

Athletics at the I ALBA Games
- Dates: June 23-24
- Host city: La Habana, Cuba
- Level: Senior
- Events: 43 (22 men, 21 women)

Athletics competitions at the 2005 ALBA Games were held in La Habana, Cuba, between June 23-24, 2005.

A total of 43 events were contested, 22 by men and 21 by women.

== Medal summary ==
Medal winners and their results were published.

=== Men ===
| Event | Gold | | Silver | | Bronze | |
|---|---|---|---|---|---|---|
| 100 metres (wind: -0.8 m/s) | Henry Vizcaíno (CUB) | 10.35 | Luis Alexander Reyes (CUB) | 10.48 | José Ángel César (CUB) | 10.67 |
| 200 metres (wind: +0.0 m/s) | Michael Herrera (CUB) | 20.98 | Yunier Pérez (CUB) | 21.16 | José Eduardo Acevedo (VEN) | 21.27 |
| 400 metres | Williams Collazo (CUB) | 47.16 | Glauder Garzón (CUB) | 47.19 | Dayron Martínez (CUB) | 47.61 |
| 800 metres | Erasmel Soriano (CUB) | 1:48.68 | José Manuel González (VEN) | 1:49.25 | José Leonardo Peña (VEN) | 1:49.48 |
| 1500 metres | Raúl Neyra (CUB) | 3:47.26 | Nico Herrera (VEN) | 3:48.97 | Liván Luque (CUB) | 3:50.92 |
| 5000 metres | Raúl Neyra (CUB) | 14:34.95 | Liván Luque (CUB) | 14:35.77 | Manuel Bellorín (VEN) | 14:49.16 |
| 10000 metres | Alexei García (CUB) | 31:22.5 | Richard Pérez (CUB) | 31:40.8 | Énder Moreno (VEN) | 31:49.5 |
| 3000 metres steeplechase | José Alberto Sánchez (CUB) | 8:56.00 | | | | |
| 110 metres hurdles (wind: +0.4 m/s) | Carlos Navarro (CUB) | 13.96 | Jesús Costa (CUB) | 14.12 | Ignacio Morales (CUB) | 14.33 |
| 400 metres hurdles | Yasser Lismet (CUB) | 51.20 | Yaudel Poll (CUB) | 51.61 | Frank Gómez (CUB) | 51.69 |
| High jump | Daniel Rodríguez (VEN) | 2.23 | Dailen Ortega (CUB); Raúl Touset (CUB) | 2.15 | | |
| Pole vault | Lázaro Eduardo Borges (CUB) | 5.00 | Reidelis González (CUB) | 4.90 | | |
| Long jump | Esteban Copland (VEN) | 7.70 (wind: +0.3 m/s) | Wilfredo Martínez (CUB) | 7.67 (wind: +0.0 m/s) | Reinier Reyes (CUB) | 7.60 (wind: +0.2 m/s) |
| Triple jump | Osniel Tosca (CUB) | 16.58 (wind: 1.4 m/s) | Alexis Copello (CUB) | 16.57 (wind: 0.3 m/s) | Dennis Fernández (CUB) | 16.52 (wind: 0.7 m/s) |
| Shot put | Alexis Paumier (CUB) | 19.23 | Yioser Toledo (CUB) | 18.30 | Reynaldo Proenza (CUB) | 17.93 |
| Discus throw | Lois Maikel Martínez (CUB) | 61.31 | Yunio Lastre (CUB) | 60.28 | Héctor Hurtado (VEN) | 56.61 |
| Hammer throw | Erik Jiménez (CUB) | 72.18 | Yosmel Monte (CUB) | 71.64 | Noleysi Vicet (CUB) | 71.35 |
| Javelin throw | Isbel Luaces (CUB) | 79.23 | Máximo Rigondeaux (CUB) | 78.59 | Yudel Moreno (CUB) | 77.97 |
| Decathlon | Alberto Juantorena Jr. (CUB) | 7662 | Yosley Azcuy (CUB) | 7328 | Carlos Patterson (CUB) | 7321 |
| 20 Kilometres Road Walk | Loisel Gutiérrez (CUB) | 1:33:10 | Víctor Álvarez (CUB) | 1:34:48 | Yubraile Hernández (CUB) | 1:36:49 |
| 4 x 100 metres relay | Cuba; José Ángel César; Michael Herrera; Henry Vizcaíno; Juan Pita | 40.08 | Cuba; Yunier Betanzos; Alejandro Valdés; Alexander González; Maikel Gómez | 40.75 | | |
| 4 x 400 metres relay | Cuba; Glauder Garzón; Williams Collazo; Yunier Pérez; Dayron Martínez | 3:08.14 | Venezuela; José Eduardo Acevedo; José Faneite; William Hernández; Josner Rodríguez | 3:10.21 | Cuba; Jorge Valcárcel; Jorge Lucas; Frank Gómez; Yordano Glemont | 3:11.37 |

=== Women ===
| Event | Gold | | Silver | | Bronze | |
|---|---|---|---|---|---|---|
| 100 metres (wind: +0.1 m/s) | Roxana Díaz (CUB) | 11.53 | Misleidys Lazo (CUB) | 11.80 | Leydis Molero (VEN) | 12.22 |
| 200 metres (wind: +0.0 m/s) | Roxana Díaz (CUB) | 23.34 | Aymeé Martínez (CUB) | 23.67 | Wilmary Álvarez (VEN) | 23.75 |
| 400 metres | Aymeé Martínez (CUB) | 52.6 | Indira Terrero (CUB) | 53.5 | Wilmary Álvarez (VEN) | 53.9 |
| 800 metres | Yuneisy Santiusty (CUB) | 2:04.60 | Yadira Vataille (CUB) | 2:04.96 | Yanelis Lara (CUB) | 2:05.07 |
| 1500 metres | Yuneisy Santiusty (CUB) | 4:28.5 | Yadira Vataille (CUB) | 4:29.2 | Yudileyvis Castillo (CUB) | 4:30.0 |
| 5000 metres | Yudelkis Martínez (CUB) | 16:24.82 | Yudileyvis Castillo (CUB) | 16:34.27 | Dailín Belmonte (CUB) | 16:35.58 |
| 10000 metres | Yudelkis Martínez (CUB) | 34:55.3 | Dailín Belmonte (CUB) | 35:10.2 | Mariolis Figueroa (CUB) | 36:52.2 |
| Half Marathon | Mariela González (CUB) | 1:17:50 | Yailén García (CUB) | 1:23:05 | Emperatriz Wilson (CUB) | 1:31:45 |
| 100 metres hurdles (wind: -1.1 m/s) | Yenima Arencibia (CUB) | 13.29 | Bertha Peñalver (CUB) | 13.53 | Sandrine Legenort (VEN) | 14.17 |
| 400 metres hurdles | Yaniuska Pérez (CUB) | 58.48 | Yadira Isaac (CUB) | 59.67 | Alina Sánchez (CUB) | 59.75 |
| High jump | Yarianny Argüelles (CUB) | 1.87 | Yanisleidi Fernández (CUB) | 1.84 | Jhoris Luque (VEN) | 1.81 |
| Pole vault | Maryoris Sánchez (CUB) | 3.90 | Katiuska Pérez (CUB) | 3.90 | Dailys Caballero (CUB) | 3.80 |
| Long jump | Daniela Coronel (VEN) | 5.92 | Iraisis Pérez (CUB) | 5.80 | Yirsi Potrillé (CUB) | 5.80 |
| Triple jump | Yarianna Martínez (CUB) | 13.80 w | Jennifer Arveláez (VEN) | 13.32 | Suanly Larrinaga (CUB) | 13.18 |
| Shot put | Mailín Vargas (CUB) | 17.30 | Ahymará Espinoza (VEN) | 15.81 | Yaniuvis López (CUB) | 15.19 |
| Discus throw | Yarelis Barrios (CUB) | 60.41 | Anaelys Fernández (CUB) | 55.82 | Yarisley Collado (CUB) | 53.47 |
| Hammer throw | Arasay Thondike (CUB) | 63.30 | Ariannys Bichy (CUB) | 60.22 | Rosa Andreína Rodríguez (VEN) | 60.02 |
| Heptathlon | Cheilyn Povea (CUB) | 5406 | Gretchen Quintana (CUB) | 5295 | Yasmiany Pedroso (CUB) | 5252 |
| 10 Kilometres Road Walk | Yarelis Sánchez (CUB) | 47:38 | Leisy Rodríguez (CUB) | 49:28 | Merlin Soyet (CUB) | 51:24 |
| 4 x 100 metres relay | Cuba | 45.32 | Venezuela | 46.74 | Cuba | 47.89 |
| 4 x 400 metres relay | Cuba | 3:37.03 | Venezuela | 3:40.59 | Cuba | 3:42.20 |

== Medal table (unofficial) ==
* Host nation (Cuba)

| Rank | Nation | Gold | Silver | Bronze | Total |
|---|---|---|---|---|---|
| 1 | Cuba* | 40 | 36 | 28 | 104 |
| 2 | Venezuela | 3 | 7 | 11 | 21 |
| Totals (2 entries) | | 43 | 43 | 39 | 125 |

== Participation (unofficial) ==
- Cuba
- (Mexico) México (2)
- (Panama) Panamá (3)
- Venezuela
