= Daisurami Bonne =

Cuban track and field sprint athlete

Personal information
- Full name: Daisurami Bonne Rousseau
- Born: 9 March 1988 (age 38) Guantánamo, Cuba
- Height: 1.71 m (5 ft 7 in)
- Weight: 60 kg (132 lb)

Sport
- Country: Cuba
- Sport: Athletics
- Event: 4 × 400m Relay
Medal record
Pan American Games
Gold medal – first place	2011 Guadalajara	4×400 m relay
Silver medal – second place	2011 Guadalajara	400 m
CAC Championships
Bronze medal – third place	2009 Havana	400 m
- Updated on 29 December 2014

Daisurami Bonne Rousseau (born 9 March 1988) is a Cuban track and field sprint athlete who specialises in the 400 metres. A two-time participant at the World Championships in Athletics (2009 and 2011), her personal best for the event is 51.69 seconds. At the 2011 Pan American Games, she was the 400 m silver medallist and a relay gold medallist. She has also won medals at the Central American and Caribbean Championships in Athletics.

== Life and career ==
Born in Guantánamo and raised in Villa Clara Province, she is the daughter of Idalmis Bonne, who was also a sprinter and Pan American Games gold medallist. Her first international appearance came at the 2008 Central American and Caribbean Championships. Although she was knocked out in the early rounds of the 200 metres, she teamed up with Aymeé Martínez, Diosmely Peña and Indira Terrero to win the gold medal in the 4×400 metres relay. Further success came in 2009: she won the 400 m silver medal and relay gold at the 2009 ALBA Games and ran under 52 seconds for the first time at the Barrientos Memorial (where she came second with a time of 51.81 sec). An individual bronze and another relay win came at the 2009 Central American and Caribbean Championships in Athletics in Havana and the team's winning time of 3:29.94 minutes enabled them to compete at the 2009 World Championships in Athletics. Bonne helped the Cubans to qualify for the final as the fastest losers with a time of 3:27.36 minutes, but the squad were almost ten seconds slower in the relay final and finished last by some distance.

With no major championships to prepare for, Bonne largely competed in Cuba in 2010 and won 400 m races at the Barrientos meet and the Olimpiada del Deporte Cubano. Her sole outing abroad that year was in San Fernando in Spain at the 2010 Ibero-American Championships in Athletics. This marked the peak of her season as she had her year's best run of 52.25 seconds to win the 400 m title before going on to anchor the Cuba relay team to a second gold medal. Her 2011 season began with a win at the Copa Cuba and later that year she ran a time of 52.04 seconds for the silver at the 2011 ALBA Games (where she also won a relay gold). She returned again to the global stage at the 2011 World Championships in Athletics and was eliminated in the heats of both the individual and relay events.

She achieved a personal best at the 2011 Pan American Games in Guadalajara in October – her time of 51.69 seconds was enough for the silver medal behind Jennifer Padilla. Bonne then anchored the 4 × 400 m Cuban relay team to the gold medal.

== Personal bests ==
- 200 m: 23.65 s (wind: 0.0 m/s) – Havana, Cuba, 21 June 2014
- 400 m: 51.69 s A – Guadalajara, Mexico, 26 October 2011

== Achievements ==
Year	Competition	Venue	Position	Event	Notes
Representing Cuba
2008	Central American and Caribbean Championships	Cali, Colombia	6th (h)	200 m	23.90 s A (wind: +0.7 m/s)
2008	Central American and Caribbean Championships	Cali, Colombia	1st	4 × 400 m relay	3:27.97 min A
2009	ALBA Games	Havana, Cuba	2nd	400 m	53.19 s
2009	ALBA Games	Havana, Cuba	1st	4 × 400 m relay	3:35.04 min
2009	Central American and Caribbean Championships	Havana, Cuba	3rd	400 m	52.31 s
2009	Central American and Caribbean Championships	Havana, Cuba	1st	4 × 400 m relay	3:29.94 min
2009	World Championships	Berlin, Germany	8th	4 × 400 m relay	3:36.99 min
2010	Ibero-American Championships	San Fernando, Spain	1st	400 m	52.25 s
2010	Ibero-American Championships	San Fernando, Spain	1st	4 × 400 m relay	3:30.73 min
2011	ALBA Games	Barquisimeto, Venezuela	2nd	400 m	52.04 s
2011	ALBA Games	Barquisimeto, Venezuela	1st	4 × 400 m relay	3:34.91 min
2011	World Championships	Daegu, South Korea	6th (h)	400 m	53.69 s
2011	World Championships	Daegu, South Korea	4th (h)	4 × 400 m relay	3:26.74 min
2011	Pan American Games	Guadalajara, Mexico	2nd	400 m	51.69 s A
2011	Pan American Games	Guadalajara, Mexico	1st	4 × 400 m relay	3:28.09 min A
2012	Ibero-American Championships	Barquisimeto, Venezuela	1st	400 m	52.27 s
2012	Ibero-American Championships	Barquisimeto, Venezuela	2nd	4 × 400 m relay	3:29.13 min
2012	Olympic Games	London, United Kingdom	6th (h)	4 × 400 m relay	3:27.41 min
2014	Pan American Sports Festival	Mexico City, Mexico	2nd	400m	51.78 s A
2014	Central American and Caribbean Games	Xalapa, Mexico	2nd	400m	52.49 s A
2014	Central American and Caribbean Games	Xalapa, Mexico	1st	4 × 400 m relay	3:29.69 min A
2015	NACAC Championships	San José, Costa Rica	—	400m	DNF
2016	Olympic Games	Rio de Janeiro, Brazil	15th (h)	4 × 400 m relay	3:30.11 min
