= Athletics at the 2007 ALBA Games =

Athletics at the II ALBA Games
- Dates: May 9-12
- Host city: Caracas, Venezuela
- Venue: Estadio Brígido Iriarte
- Level: Senior
- Events: 46 (23 men, 23 women)

Athletics competitions at the 2007 ALBA Games were held at the Estadio Brígido Iriarte in Caracas, Venezuela, between May 9-12, 2007.

A total of 46 events were contested, 23 by men and 23 by women.

== Medal summary ==
Medal winners and their results were published. Complete results can be found on the CACAC webpage.

=== Men ===
Event	Gold		Silver		Bronze	
100 metres (wind: +2.3 m/s)	Alonso Edward (PAN)	10.25 w	Henry Vizcaíno (CUB)	10.30 w	Kael Becerra (CHI)	10.35 w
200 metres (wind: +2.0 m/s)	Michael Herrera (CUB)	20.31	Alonso Edward (PAN)	20.62 NR NR-j	David Lescay (CUB)	20.97
400 metres	Williams Collazo (CUB)	45.68	Angelo Edmund (PAN)	46.68	Josner Rodríguez (VEN)	46.79
800 metres	Yeimer López (CUB)	1:47.25	Andy González (CUB)	1:48.51	Simoncito Silvera (VEN)	1:49.13
1500 metres	Maury Surel Castillo (CUB)	3:42.43	Nico Herrera (VEN)	3:44.91	Eduard Villanueva (VEN)	3:46.22
5000 metres	Freddy González (VEN)	14:06.40	Aguelmis Rojas (CUB)	14:21.90	Didimo Sánchez (VEN)	14:24.06
10000 metres	Aguelmis Rojas (CUB)	30:14.33	Didimo Sánchez (VEN)	30:17.86	Juan Diego Contreras (PER)	30:33.48
Half Marathon	Lervis Arias (VEN)	1:07:18	Roberth Enrique Lugo (VEN)	1:08:19	Deivis Sánchez (VEN)	1:08:52
3000 metres steeplechase	José Alberto Sánchez (CUB)	8:49.12	José Gregorio Peña (VEN)	8:51.42	Emigdio Delgado (VEN)	8:55.83
110 metres hurdles (wind: +0.6 m/s)	Yoel Hernández (CUB)	13.70	Ryan Brathwaite (BAR)	13.91	Jonathan Davis (VEN)	14.47
400 metres hurdles	Omar Cisneros (CUB)	49.57	Yasmany Copello (CUB)	49.99	Luis Montenegro (CHI)	50.18
High jump	Víctor Moya (CUB)	2.31	Beltrán León (VEN)	2.16	Albert Bravo (VEN)	2.10
Pole vault	José Francisco Nava (CHI)	4.95	César González (VEN)	4.95	Junior Angulo (VEN)	4.70
Long jump	Wilfredo Martínez (CUB)	8.17 (wind: +0.9 m/s)	Jairo Guibert (CUB)	7.69 (wind: +1.9 m/s)	Esteban Copland (VEN)	7.55 (wind: -0.1 m/s)
Triple jump	Osniel Tosca (CUB)	17.52 (wind: +1.0 m/s)	Yoelbi Quesada (CUB)	16.87 (wind: +0.0 m/s)	Ronald Belisario (VEN)	15.99 (wind: +0.0 m/s)
Shot put	Carlos Véliz (CUB)	19.54	Alexis Paumier (CUB)	19.26	Yojer Enrique Medina (VEN)	18.36
Discus throw	Jorge Fernández (CUB)	56.83	Yunio Lastre (CUB)	56.31	Jesús Parejo (VEN)	53.43
Hammer throw	Noleysi Vicet (CUB)	70.74	Patricio Palma (CHI)	67.65	Iosvany Suárez (CUB)	67.52
Javelin throw	Guillermo Martínez (CUB)	83.02	Anier Boué (CUB)	79.14	Arley Ibargüen (COL)	76.97
Decathlon	Yosley Azcuy (CUB)	7526	Alexis Chivás (CUB)	7061	Juan Jaramillo (VEN)	6789
20 Kilometres Road Walk	Salvador Ernesto Mira (ESA)	1:29:44	Édison Moreno (ECU)	1:30:32	Yubraile Hernández (CUB)	1:31:56
4 x 100 metres relay	Cuba; David Lescay; Yoel Hernández; Michael Herrera; Henry Vizcaíno	39.23	(Panama) Panamá; Andrés Rodríguez; Angelo Edmund; Jonathan Gibson; Alonso Edward	40.07	Venezuela	40.19
4 x 400 metres relay	Cuba; Williams Collazo; Omar Cisneros; Yasmany Copello; Yeimer López	3:06.84	Venezuela	3:10.93		

=== Women ===
Event	Gold		Silver		Bronze	
100 metres (wind: +1.5 m/s)	Virgen Benavides (CUB)	11.35	Misleidys Lazo (CUB)	11.38	Marleni Mejía (DOM)	11.71
200 metres (wind: +1.9 m/s)	Roxana Díaz (CUB)	22.98	Aymeé Martínez (CUB)	23.18	María Navas (VEN)	24.83
400 metres	Indira Terrero (CUB)	51.99	Susana Clement (CUB)	53.15	Madeleine Rondón (VEN)	55.01
800 metres	Ana Hachy Peña (CUB)	2:07.14	Sheena Gooding (BAR)	2:10.06	Mercedes Nayarí Cedeño (VEN)	2:15.70
1500 metres	Yadira Vataille (CUB)	4:29.89	Yudisleidis Fuente (CUB)	4:30.56	Yeisy Álvarez (VEN)	4:31.00
5000 metres	Yudileyvis Castillo (CUB)	16:57.98	Yeisy Álvarez (VEN)	17:01.24	Zuleima Amaya (VEN)	17:06.25
10000 metres	Norelis Lugo (VEN)	35:42.01	Dailín Belmonte (CUB)	36:04.64	Zuleima Amaya (VEN)	36:14.93
Half Marathon	Mariela González (CUB)	1:17:53	Yailén García (CUB)	1:19:17	Yolimar Pineda (VEN)	1:22:12
3000 metres steeplechase	Rocío Huillca (PER)	11:32.24	Princesa Fiume (VEN)	11:38.93	Miliani Graterol (VEN)	13:55.93
100 metres hurdles (wind: +0.1 m/s)	Jeimy Bernárdez (HON)	14.31	Sandrine Legenort (VEN)	14.37	Ada Hernández (VEN)	14.47
400 metres hurdles	Daimí Pernía (CUB)	56.98	Magdalena Mendoza (VEN)	59.79	Daisy Ugarte (BOL)	61.24
High jump	Caterine Ibargüen (COL)	1.85	Marierlis Rojas (VEN)	1.82	Yarianny Argüelles (CUB)	1.82
Pole vault	Yarisley Silva (CUB)	4.15	Keisa Monterola (VEN)	4.10	Milena Agudelo (COL)	4.00
Long jump	Yargelis Savigne (CUB)	6.60 (wind: +0.0 m/s)	Yudelkis Fernández (CUB)	6.37 (wind: -1.5 m/s)	Jéssica Morillo (VEN)	5.82 (wind: -1.3 m/s)
Triple jump	Yargelis Savigne (CUB)	14.99 (wind: +0.7 m/s) NR	Mabel Gay (CUB)	14.57 (wind: +2.0 m/s)	Jennifer Arveláez (VEN)	13.63 (wind: +1.1 m/s)
Shot put	Yumileidi Cumbá (CUB)	18.24	Mailín Vargas (CUB)	18.08	Natalia Ducó (CHI)	16.59
Discus throw	Yania Ferrales (CUB)	64.18	Yarisley Collado (CUB)	54.47	Ximena Araneda (CHI)	47.71
Hammer throw	Yipsi Moreno (CUB)	70.44	Rosa Andreína Rodríguez (VEN)	61.93	Johana Moreno (COL)	61.20
Javelin throw	María de la Caridad Álvarez (CUB)	59.95	Osleidys Menéndez (CUB)	58.98	Zuleima Araméndiz (COL)	55.69
Heptathlon	Gretchen Quintana (CUB)	6076	Yasmiany Pedroso (CUB)	5942	Thaimara Solsiree Rivas (VEN)	5024
20 Kilometres Road Walk	Leisy Rodríguez (CUB)	1:38:15	Geovana Irusta (BOL)	1:39:20	Yarelis Sánchez (CUB)	1:40:56
4 x 100 metres relay	Cuba; Virgen Benavides; Roxana Díaz; Misleidys Lazo; Aymée Martínez	43.86	Venezuela	46.28	Nicaragua	49.22
4 x 400 metres relay	Cuba; Susana Clement; Daimí Pernía; Indira Terrero; Ana Hachy Peña	3:38.77	Venezuela	3:41.30	Nicaragua	4:13.77

== Medal table (unofficial) ==
* Host nation (Venezuela)

Rank	Nation	Gold	Silver	Bronze	Total
1	Cuba (CUB)	37	22	5	64
2	Venezuela (VEN)*	3	16	27	46
3	Panama (PAN)	1	3	0	4
4	Chile (CHI)	1	1	4	6
5	Colombia (COL)	1	0	4	5
6	Peru (PER)	1	0	1	2
7	El Salvador (ESA)	1	0	0	1
7	Honduras (HON)	1	0	0	1
9	Barbados (BAR)	0	2	0	2
10	Bolivia (BOL)	0	1	1	2
11	Ecuador (ECU)	0	1	0	1
12	Nicaragua (NIC)	0	0	2	2
13	Dominican Republic (DOM)	0	0	1	1
Totals (13 entries)		46	46	45	137

== Participation (unofficial) ==
An unofficial count yields the participation of athletes from the following 15 countries:

- Barbados
- Bolivia
- Chile
- Colombia
- Cuba
- Dominican Republic
- Ecuador
- El Salvador
- Guatemala
- (Haiti) Haïti
- Honduras
- Nicaragua
- (Panama) Panamá
- (Peru) Perú
- Venezuela
