= Raidel Acea =

Cuban-born track and field athlete

Personal information
- Full name: Raidel Acea Morales
- Born: 31 October 1990 (age 35) Cienfuegos, Cuba

Sport
- Country: Portugal
- Sport: Running
- Event: Middle distances
- Club: Benfica
Medal record
Men's athletics
Representing Cuba
Pan American Games
Gold medal – first place	2011 Guadalajara	4×400 m relay
Bronze medal – third place	2011 Guadalajara	800 m
- Updated on 15 December 2014

Raidel Acea Morales (born 31 October 1990) is a Cuban-born track and field athlete who competes for Portugal in the 400 metres and 800 metres events. The 2009 Pan American junior champion over 800 m, he won the bronze medal in the event at the 2011 Pan American Games.

Born and raised in the Cuban city of Cienfuegos, Acea began taking part in athletics at the age of ten and started out as a 400 m runner. As he grew older, he began running in the 800 m as well upon the advice of the coaches at his local high performance sports centre. His first successes came at the age of eighteen in the 2009 season. After placing third at the Rafael Fortún Memorial he claimed the 800 m silver medal at the 2009 ALBA Games. He ran an 800 m best of 1:46.68 minutes for third at the Barrientos Memorial in May then ran a 400 m personal best of 46.19 seconds the following month. His season ended on a high as he won the 800 m title for Cuba at the 2009 Pan American Junior Athletics Championships.

In 2010, Acea faltered in his first year as a senior athlete. He managed third over 800 m at both the Barrientos meet and the Olimpiada del Deporte Cubano, but did not improve in his performances. Acea judged that he needed the season to adjust to the higher senior level. He made his senior breakthrough the very next season, starting with an 800 m win at the Copa Cuba national championships, where he was also second over 400 m. A duel between Acea and his more senior rival Andy González proved to be a highlight of the Barrientos Memorial, and it was the younger Cuban who won and set a personal best of 1:45.62 minutes. He won medals at the 2011 ALBA Games, claiming the 800 m title and taking a silver medal with Cuba's 4×400 metres relay team. He was chosen to represent Cuba at the 2011 Pan American Games and while his older compatriot González won the 800 m title, Acea earned the bronze medal with his sprint finish. He reached the podium for a second time at the event as part of Cuba's 4 × 400 m relay squad: Noel Ruíz, Acea, Omar Cisneros and William Collazo dipped under three minutes to win the relay gold.

== Personal bests ==
- 400 m: 45.18 s – Havana, Cuba, 26 May 2015
- 800 m: 1:45.62 min – Havana, Cuba, 28 May 2011

== Achievements ==
Year	Competition	Venue	Position	Event	Notes
Representing Cuba
2009	ALBA Games	Havana, Cuba	2nd	800 m	1:47.51 min
2009	ALBA Games	Havana, Cuba	3rd	4 × 400 m relay	3:14.19 min
2009	Pan American Junior Championships	Port of Spain, Trinidad and Tobago	1st	800 m	1:48.09 min
2011	ALBA Games	Barquisimeto, Venezuela	1st	800 m	1:47.06 min
2011	ALBA Games	Barquisimeto, Venezuela	2nd	4 × 400 m relay	3:05.73 min
2011	Pan American Games	Guadalajara, Mexico	3rd	800 m	1:46.23 min A
2011	Pan American Games	Guadalajara, Mexico	1st	4 × 400 m relay	2:59.43 min A
2012	Ibero-American Championships	Barquisimeto, Venezuela	1st	4 × 400 m relay	3:00.43 min
2012	Olympic Games	London, United Kingdom	–	4 × 400 m relay	DNF
2013	Central American and Caribbean Championships	Morelia, Mexico	4th	4 × 400 m relay	3:03.17 A
2013	World Championships	Moscow, Russia	17th (h)	4 × 400 m relay	3:04.26
2014	World Relays	Nassau, Bahamas	5th	4 × 400 m relay	3:00.61
2014	Pan American Sports Festival	Mexico City, Mexico	8th	800m	1:56.34 A
2014	Central American and Caribbean Games	Xalapa, Mexico	1st	400m	45.36 A
2014	Central American and Caribbean Games	Xalapa, Mexico	1st	4 × 400 m relay	3:00.70 A
2015	IAAF World Relays	Nassau, Bahamas	10th	4 × 400 m relay	3:03.73
2015	World Championships	Beijing, China	7th	4 × 400 m relay	3:03.05
