= Athletics at the 2011 ALBA Games =

Athletics at the IV ALBA Games
- Dates: July 27-30
- Host city: Barquisimeto, Venezuela
- Venue: Polideportivo Máximo Viloria
- Level: Senior
- Events: 43 (22 men, 21 women)

Athletics competitions at the 2011 ALBA Games were held at the Polideportivo Máximo Viloria in Barquisimeto, Venezuela, between July 27-30, 2011.

A total of 43 events were contested, 22 by men and 21 by women.

== Medal summary ==
Medal winners and complete results were published. Some wind info was retrieved.

=== Men ===
Event	Gold		Silver		Bronze	
100 metres (wind: +0.9 m/s)	David Lescay (CUB)	10.28	Michael Herrera (CUB)	10.35	Quinse Clarke (GUY)	10.68
200 metres (wind: 2.4 m/s)	Roberto Skyers (CUB)	20.44 w	Michael Herrera (CUB)	20.67 w	Winston George (GUY)	20.84 w
400 metres	Noel Ruíz (CUB)	45.53	Winston George (GUY)	45.86	Omar Longart (VEN)	46.33
800 metres	Raidel Acea (CUB)	1:47.06	Nico Herrera (VEN)	1:48.07	Anthony Harlequin (GUY)	1:50.36
1500 metres	Nico Herrera (VEN)	3:47.57	Erick Rodríguez (NCA)	3:58.82	Cleveland Thomas (GUY)	4:06.01
5000 metres	Marvin Blanco (VEN)	15:08.61	Daniel Toroya (BOL)	15:32.44	Dimas Castro (NCA)	16:41.19
10000 metres	Sánchez Deivis (GUA)	32:48.53	Dimas Castro (NCA)	35:00.81		
Half Marathon	Henry Jaens (CUB)	1:06:30.94				
3000 metres steeplechase	José Peña (VEN)	8:45.25	Erick Rodríguez (NCA)	9:15.28	Cristián Patiño (ECU)	9:18.19
110 metres hurdles (wind: 1.3 m/s)	Yuniel Hernández (CUB)	13.58	Jhoanis Portilla (CUB)	13.90	Jhon Tamayo (ECU)	14.51
400 metres hurdles	Amaurys Valle (CUB)	51.38	Víctor Solarte (VEN)	53.68		
High jump	Víctor Moya (CUB)	2.28	Yordano Glemaud (CUB)	2.17	Diego Ferrín (ECU)	2.14
Long jump	Víctor Castillo (VEN)	8.03 (wind: 2.0 m/s)	Hugo Chila (ECU)	7.66 (wind: 0.1 m/s)	Yender Cardona (VEN)	6.84
Triple jump	Hugo Chila (ECU)	15.69	Yender Cardona (VEN)	14.75 (wind: 1.0 m/s)		
Shot put	Reinaldo Proenza (CUB)	18.72	Jesús Parejo (VEN)	17.56	Aldo Gonzales (BOL)	17.08
Discus throw	Yunio Lastre (CUB)	60.97	Jesús Parejo (VEN)	54.85	Donald Olmos (BOL)	52.11
Hammer throw	Noleisis Bicet (CUB)	71.14	Guillermo Braulio (ECU)	56.34		
Javelin throw	Michel Miranda (CUB)	75.13	Víctor Fatecha (PAR)	71.85	José Escobar (ECU)	69.17
Decathlon	Júnior Díaz (CUB)	7800	Geormi Jaramillo (VEN)	7297	Ricardo Herrada (VEN)	7070
20 Kilometres Road Walk	Rolando Saquipay (ECU)	1:28:20.13	Mauricio Arteaga (ECU)	1:32:31.38	Ronal Quispe (BOL)	1:33:32.46
4 x 100 metres relay	Cuba; Yuniel Hernández; Michael Herrera; David Lescay; Roberto Skyers	39.34	Guyana; Rupert Andel Perry; Chavez Ageday; Winston George; Quinse Clarke	40.07	Ecuador; Franklin Nazareno; Hugo Chila; Álex Quiñónez; Jhon Tamayo	40.73
4 x 400 metres relay	Venezuela; Omar Longart; Alberto Aguilar; José Acevedo; Arturo Ramírez	3:04.91	Cuba; David Lescay; Raidel Acea; Amaurys Valle; Noel Ruíz	3:05.75	Guyana; Anthony Harlequin; Patrick King; Cleveland Thomas; Winston George	3:10.49

=== Women ===
Event	Gold		Silver		Bronze	
100 metres (wind: -0.7 m/s)	Nelkis Casabona (CUB)	11.34	Lexabeth Hidalgo (VEN)	11.96	Wilmary Álvarez (VEN)	12.04
200 metres (wind: 2.0 m/s)	Nelkis Casabona (CUB)	22.97	Érika Chávez (ECU)	23.72	Yameisi Borlot (CUB)	24.06
400 metres	Aymée Martínez (CUB)	52.01	Daysurami Bonne (CUB)	52.04	Lucy Jaramillo (ECU)	55.97
800 metres	Adriana Muñoz (CUB)	2:02.55	Diosmely Peña (CUB)	2:04.45	María Osorio (VEN)	2:08.65
1500 metres	Adriana Muñoz (CUB)	4:23.28	María Osorio (VEN)	4:27.55	Nubia Arteaga (VEN)	4:33.36
5000 metres	Nubia Arteaga (VEN)	17:18.20	Helen Daniela Baltazar (BOL)	18:29.80	Cassie Vitalis (ATG)	20:20.33
10000 metres	Dailín Belmonte (CUB)	34:52.59	Rosa Chacha (ECU)	35:37.64		
Half Marathon	Dailín Belmonte (CUB)	1:14:45.84	Zuleima Amaya (VEN)	1:15:55.97	Yailén García (CUB)	1:18:13.97
3000 metres steeplechase	Marlene Acuña (ECU)	11:12.05	Hilaria Patzi (BOL)	11:34.32	Dayana Pérez (VEN)	12:03.40
100 metres hurdles (wind: 0.8 m/s)	Yenima Arencibia (CUB)	13.36	Winnie Castillo (ECU)	14.28		
400 metres hurdles	Lucy Jaramillo (ECU)	61.27	Jessica Aguilera (NCA)	62.83		
Long jump	Suslaidy Girat (CUB)	6.36 (wind: 0.2 m/s)	Munich Tovar (VEN)	6.05 (wind: 1.3 m/s)	Verónica Davis (VEN)	5.89
Triple jump	Yarianna Martínez (CUB)	14.19 (wind: -0.8 m/s)	Yudelsi González (VEN)	12.94 (wind: -0.7 m/s)	Munich Tovar (VEN)	12.92 (wind: 2.0 m/s)
Shot put	Mailín Vargas (CUB)	18.77	Ahymará Espinoza (VEN)	15.98		
Discus throw	Yaime Pérez (CUB)	55.26	María Cubillán (VEN)	50.65	Natalia Alfonso (VEN)	41.53
Hammer throw	Rosa Rodríguez (VEN)	67.25	Ariannis Vichy (CUB)	62.08	Dukina Freytters (VEN)	58.71
Javelin throw	Yainelis Ribeaux (CUB)	58.93	Leryn Franco (PAR)	56.17	Dalila Rugama (NCA)	49.63
Heptathlon	Yasmiany Pedroso (CUB)	5356	Gillerci González (VEN)	5276	Inaly Morazán (NCA)	3983
20 Kilometres Road Walk	Claudia Balderrama (BOL)	1:39:06.55	Leisis Rodríguez (CUB)	1:39:24.78	Paola Pérez (ECU)	1:41:26.32
4 x 100 metres relay	Cuba; Yenima Arencibia; Yameisi Borlot; Nelkis Casabona; Yarianna Martínez	45.33	Venezuela; Munich Tovar; Prisciliana Chourio; Lexabeth Hidalgo; Wilmary Álvarez	45.79	Ecuador; Lucy Jaramillo; Winnie Castillo; Mayra Pachito; Érika Chávez	48.02
4 x 400 metres relay	Cuba; Aymée Martínez; Diosmely Peña; Susana Clement; Daysurami Bonne	3:34.91	Venezuela; Ángela Alfonso; María Osorio; Nubia Arteaga; Wilmary Álvarez	3:53.11		

== Medal table ==
The medal table was published.

* Host nation (Venezuela)

Rank	Nation	Gold	Silver	Bronze	Total
1	Cuba	30	9	2	41
2	Venezuela*	7	16	11	34
3	Ecuador	4	6	8	18
4	Bolivia	1	3	3	7
5	Guatemala	1	0	0	1
6	Nicaragua	0	4	3	7
7	Guyana	0	2	5	7
8	Paraguay	0	2	0	2
9	Netherlands Antilles	0	0	1	1
Totals (9 entries)		43	42	33	118

== Participation (unofficial) ==
An unofficial count yields the participation of athletes from the following 11 countries:

- Antigua and Barbuda
- Barbados
- Bolivia
- Cuba
- Ecuador
- El Salvador
- Guatemala
- Guyana
- Nicaragua
- Paraguay
- Venezuela
