= Nelkis Casabona =

Cuban sprinter

Personal information
- Full name: Nelkis Teresa Casabona González
- Born: 12 January 1984 (age 42) Pueblo Nuevo, Matanzas, Cuba

Sport
- Country: Cuba
- Sport: Athletics
- Updated on 24 June 2013

Nelkis Teresa Casabona González (born 12 May 1984) is a Cuban track and field sprinter who specialises in the 200 metres. She has a personal best of 22.97 seconds for the event. She represented Cuba at the World Championships in Athletics and Pan American Games in 2011.

== Life and career ==
Casabona was born and raised in Pueblo Nuevo, one of three wards of Matanzas in Cuba. In her first international appearance she finished fourth in the 200 m final at the 2001 World Youth Championships in Athletics, but was disqualified for a lane infraction. It was not until 2009 that she began to make her impact on the Cuban senior ranks. That year she ran personal bests of 11.62 seconds for the 100 metres and 23.84 seconds for the 200 m. She was runner-up over 200 m at the 2009 ALBA Games, held in Havana, and helped the Cuban women win the 4×100 metres relay. She did not run abroad in 2010; her season was highlighted by a 100 m win at the Barrientos Memorial and new best of 11.39 seconds for the distance.

The 2011 season proved to be a breakthrough one for Casabona. She improved her 100 m best to 11.31 seconds then won both sprints at the Barrientos Memorial. She won the 100 m, 200 m and 4 × 100 m relay events at the 2011 ALBA Games. She broke the games record times in the events and dipped under twenty-three seconds for the first time in the 200 m final, running 22.97 seconds. Her global senior debut followed at the 2011 World Championships in Athletics: she was knocked out in the 100 m heats, but reached the 200 m final. An appearance at the 2011 Pan American Games closed her season and she was a finalist in both sprints as well as part of the fourth-placed Cuban relay team.

She won both Cuban sprint titles in 2012 and placed seventh in the 200 m at the 2012 Ibero-American Championships in Athletics. She was chosen to run the 200 m for the Cuban team at the 2012 London Olympics.

== Personal bests ==
- 100 m: 11.31 s – Havana, Cuba, 12 May 2011
- 200 m: 22.97 s (wind: +2.0 m/s) – Barquisimeto, Venezuela, 29 July 2011

== Achievements ==
Year	Competition	Venue	Position	Event	Notes
Representing Cuba
2001	World Youth Championships	Debrecen, Hungary	–	200 m	DQ (f)
2009	ALBA Games	Havana, Cuba	2nd	200 m	23.83 s (+0.7 m/s)
2009	ALBA Games	Havana, Cuba	1st	4 × 100 m relay	44.93 s
2009	Central American and Caribbean Championships	Havana, Cuba	4th (h)	200 m	24.25 s (-1.8 m/s)
2011	ALBA Games	Barquisimeto, Venezuela	1st	100 m	11.34 s (-0.7 m/s)
2011	ALBA Games	Barquisimeto, Venezuela	1st	200 m	22.97 s (+2.0 m/s)
2011	ALBA Games	Barquisimeto, Venezuela	1st	4 × 100 m relay	45.33 s
2011	World Championships	Daegu, South Korea	4th (h)	100 m	11.47 s (+0.3 m/s)
2011	World Championships	Daegu, South Korea	7th (sf)	200 m	23.32 s (-0.7 m/s)
2011	Pan American Games	Guadalajara, Mexico	7th	100 m	11.56 s A
2011	Pan American Games	Guadalajara, Mexico	5th	200 m	23.43 s A
2011	Pan American Games	Guadalajara, Mexico	4th	4 × 100 m relay	43.97 s A
2012	Ibero-American Championships	Barquisimeto, Venezuela	7th	200 m	23.65 s (+0.9 m/s)
2012	Olympic Games	London, United Kingdom	8th (h)	200 m	23.82 s (+0.8 m/s)
