= Athletics at the 2014 Pan American Sports Festival – Results =

These are the results of the athletics competition at the 2014 Pan American Sports Festival which took place from August 15 to 16, 2014 at the Estadio Jesús Martínez "Palillo" in Mexico City, Mexico.

== Men's results ==
=== 100 meters ===
Heats – 15 August

Rank	Name	Nationality	Time	Notes
1	Daniel Bailey	Antigua and Barbuda	10.17 (-1.6 m/s)	q
2	Jason Rogers	Saint Kitts and Nevis	10.24 (-0.3 m/s)	q
3	Bernado Brady	Jamaica	10.35 (-0.3 m/s)	q
4	Isidro Montoya	Colombia	10.36 (-0.3 m/s)	q
5	Miguel López	Puerto Rico	10.37 (-1.6 m/s)	q
6	Rolando Palacios	Honduras	10.41 (-1.7 m/s)	q
6	Diego Palomeque	Colombia	10.41 (-1.6 m/s)	q
8	Oshane Bailey	Jamaica	10.42 (-1.7 m/s)	q
9	Yadier Cuéllar	Cuba	10.44 (-1.7 m/s)	
10	Courtney Carl Williams	Saint Vincent and the Grenadines	10.69 (-0.3 m/s)	
11	Michael Wilson	Grenada	10.80 (-1.6 m/s)	
12	Elton Bollers	Guyana	10.84 (-1.7 m/s)	
13	Ángel Ayala	Paraguay	10.84 (-1.7 m/s)	
14	Kimorie Sherman	Saint Vincent and the Grenadines	10.86 (-1.7 m/s)	
15	Jurgen Themen	Suriname	11.05 (-1.6 m/s)	

Final – 15 August – Wind: -1.3 m/s

Rank	Name	Nationality	Time	Notes
1st place, gold medalist(s)	Jason Rogers	Saint Kitts and Nevis	10.08	
2nd place, silver medalist(s)	Daniel Bailey	Antigua and Barbuda	10.10	
3rd place, bronze medalist(s)	Isidro Montoya	Colombia	10.31	
4	Oshane Bailey	Jamaica	10.39	
4	Rolando Palacios	Honduras	10.39	
6	Miguel López	Puerto Rico	10.40	
7	Bernado Brady	Jamaica	10.41	
8	Diego Palomeque	Colombia	10.51	

=== 200 meters ===
Heats – 16 August

Rank	Name	Nationality	Time	Notes
1	José Carlos Herrera	Mexico	20.41 (-0.6 m/s)	q
2	Sheldon Mitchell	Jamaica	20.54 (-0.6 m/s)	q
2	Roberto Skyers	Cuba	20.54 (-0.6 m/s)	q
4	Jermaine Brown	Jamaica	20.58 (0.2 m/s)	q
5	Brijesh Lawrence	Saint Kitts and Nevis	20.61 (0.9 m/s)	q
6	Rolando Palacios	Honduras	20.73 (0.2 m/s)	q
7	Daniel Bailey	Antigua and Barbuda	20.90 (0.9 m/s)	q
8	Jason Rogers	Saint Kitts and Nevis	20.96 (-0.6 m/s)	q
9	Diego Palomeque	Colombia	21.09 (-0.6 m/s)	
10	Fredy Maidana	Paraguay	21.12 (0.2 m/s)	
11	Juander Santos	Dominican Republic	21.17 (0.9 m/s)	
12	Courtney Carl Williams	Saint Vincent and the Grenadines	21.19 (0.2 m/s)	
13	Kimorie Sherman	Saint Vincent and the Grenadines	21.21 (0.9 m/s)	
14	Kegan Campbell	Jamaica	21.56 (0.2 m/s)	
15	Elton Bollers	Guyana	21.63 (-0.6 m/s)	
16	Michael Wilson	Grenada	21.79 (0.9 m/s)	
17	Jurgen Themen	Suriname	22.77 (-0.6 m/s)	
	Akeem Williams	Jamaica	DSQ (0.9 m/s)	

Final – 16 August – Wind: +0.6 m/s

Rank	Name	Nationality	Time	Notes
1st place, gold medalist(s)	Sheldon Mitchell	Jamaica	20.14	
2nd place, silver medalist(s)	Roberto Skyers	Cuba	20.28	
3rd place, bronze medalist(s)	Jermaine Brown	Jamaica	20.28	
4	José Carlos Herrera	Mexico	20.36	
5	Daniel Bailey	Antigua and Barbuda	20.40	
6	Brijesh Lawrence	Saint Kitts and Nevis	20.46	
7	Rolando Palacios	Honduras	20.50	
8	Jason Rogers	Saint Kitts and Nevis	20.84	

=== 400 meters ===
Heats – 15 August

Rank	Name	Nationality	Time	Notes
1	Luguelín Santos	Dominican Republic	45.60	q
2	Pedro de Oliveira	Brazil	45.74	q
3	Carlos Lemos	Colombia	46.13	q
4	Yoandys Lescay	Cuba	46.14	q
5	Stephan James	Guyana	46.18	q
6	Allodin Fothergill	Jamaica	46.34	q
7	Chumaine Fitten	Jamaica	46.37	q
8	Alvin Green	Jamaica	46.38	q
9	Erison Hurtault	Dominica	46.51	
10	Miguel Barton	Jamaica	47.23	
11	Juander Santos	Dominican Republic	47.41	

Final – 16 August

Rank	Name	Nationality	Time	Notes
1st place, gold medalist(s)	Luguelín Santos	Dominican Republic	45.06	
2nd place, silver medalist(s)	Allodin Fothergill	Jamaica	45.47	
3rd place, bronze medalist(s)	Yoandys Lescay	Cuba	45.54	
4	Chumaine Fitten	Jamaica	45.56	
5	Pedro de Oliveira	Brazil	45.69	
6	Carlos Lemos	Colombia	45.71	
7	Stephan James	Guyana	46.54	
8	Alvin Green	Jamaica	46.78	

=== 800 meters ===
Final – 16 August

Rank	Name	Nationality	Time	Notes
1st place, gold medalist(s)	Andy González	Cuba	1:49.61	
2nd place, silver medalist(s)	Tayron Reyes	Dominican Republic	1:50.06	
3rd place, bronze medalist(s)	James Eichberger	Mexico	1:50.26	
4	Harun Abda	United States	1:50.60	
5	Alexis Sotelo	Mexico	1:52.66	
6	Bryan Martínez	Mexico	1:53.58	
7	Anthony Tulloch	Jamaica	1:53.92	
8	Raidel Acea	Cuba	1:56.34	

=== 1500 meters ===
Final – 16 August

Rank	Name	Nationality	Time	Notes
1st place, gold medalist(s)	Marvin Blanco	Venezuela	3:47.39	
2nd place, silver medalist(s)	Christopher Sandoval	Mexico	3:48.75	
3rd place, bronze medalist(s)	Carlos Díaz	Chile	3:49.20	
4	Jack Bolas	United States	3:49.24	
5	Freddy Espinoza	Colombia	3:50.86	
6	José Juan Esparza	Mexico	3:50.90	
7	Edgar Alan García	Mexico	4:00.89	
8	Alfredo Santana	Puerto Rico	4:04.63	
9	Álvaro Abreu	Dominican Republic	4:04.72	
10	José María Martínez	Mexico	4:05.05	
11	Erick Rodríguez	Nicaragua	4:09.85	
	Diego Borrego	Mexico	DNF	

=== 5000 meters ===
Final – 16 August

Rank	Name	Nationality	Time	Notes
1st place, gold medalist(s)	Juan Luis Barrios	Mexico	14:22.24	
2nd place, silver medalist(s)	Saby Luna	Mexico	14:28.84	
3rd place, bronze medalist(s)	Juan Carlos Romero	Mexico	14:31.65	
4	Miguel Ángel Hernández	Mexico	14:46.90	
5	Sergio Pedraza	Mexico	15:00.44	
6	Víctor Alfredo Montañez	Mexico	15:22.80	
	Osmar Pacheco	Mexico	DNF	

=== 3000 meters steeplechase ===
Final – 15 August

Rank	Name	Nationality	Time	Notes
1st place, gold medalist(s)	Marvin Blanco	Venezuela	9:18.44	
2nd place, silver medalist(s)	Gerard Giraldo	Colombia	9:19.91	
3rd place, bronze medalist(s)	Luis Enrique Ibarra	Mexico	9:20.42	
4	Javier Quintana	Mexico	9:30.30	
5	Álvaro Abreu	Dominican Republic	9:34.21	
6	Mauricio Valdivia	Chile	9:42.21	
7	Erick Rodríguez	Nicaragua	10:41.74	

=== 110 meters hurdles ===
Heats – 16 August

Rank	Name	Nationality	Time	Notes
1	Ryan Brathwaite	Barbados	13.43 (-0.2 m/s)	q
2	Javier McFarlane	Peru	13.57 (-0.2 m/s)	q
3	Jhoanis Portilla	Cuba	13.60 (-0.2 m/s)	q
4	Eddie Lovett	U.S. Virgin Islands	13.61 (-0.2 m/s)	q
5	Yordan O'Farrill	Cuba	13.72 (-0.2 m/s)	q
6	Deuce Carter	Jamaica	13.76 (-0.2 m/s)	q
7	Jorge McFarlane	Peru	13.78 (-0.2 m/s)	q
8	Agustín Carrera	Argentina	13.88 (-0.2 m/s)	q
9	Genaro Rodríguez	Mexico	13.98 (-0.2 m/s)	
10	Héctor Cotto	Puerto Rico	14.31 (-0.2 m/s)	

Final – 16 August – Wind: -0.1 m/s

Rank	Name	Nationality	Time	Notes
1st place, gold medalist(s)	Ryan Brathwaite	Barbados	13.41	
2nd place, silver medalist(s)	Deuce Carter	Jamaica	13.51	
3rd place, bronze medalist(s)	Eddie Lovett	U.S. Virgin Islands	13.62	
4	Javier McFarlane	Peru	13.68	
5	Jhoanis Portilla	Cuba	13.72	
6	Jorge McFarlane	Peru	13.81	
7	Agustín Carrera	Argentina	14.01	
	Yordan O'Farrill	Cuba	FS	

=== 400 meters hurdles ===
Final – 16 August

Rank	Name	Nationality	Time	Notes
1st place, gold medalist(s)	Jeffery Gibson	Bahamas	48.91	
2nd place, silver medalist(s)	Joseph Robertson	Jamaica	49.04	
3rd place, bronze medalist(s)	Andrés Silva	Uruguay	49.08	
4	Isa Phillips	Jamaica	50.42	
5	Leslie Murray	U.S. Virgin Islands	51.12	
6	Amaury Valle	Cuba	52.21	

=== High jump ===
Final – 16 August

Rank	Name	Nationality	Result	Notes
1st place, gold medalist(s)	Nick Ross	United States	2.26m	
2nd place, silver medalist(s)	Jamal Wilson	Bahamas	2.26m	
3rd place, bronze medalist(s)	Edgar Rivera	Mexico	2.23m	
4	Luis Joel Castro	Puerto Rico	2.23m	
5	Eure Yánez	Venezuela	2.20m	
6	Talles Silva	Brazil	2.15m	
7	Alexander Bowen	Panama	2.10m	
8	Henry Edmon	Panama	2.10m	
9	Humberto Areola	Mexico	2.05m	
	Ashawni Wright	Jamaica	NH	

=== Pole vault ===
Final – 15 August

Rank	Name	Nationality	Result	Notes
1st place, gold medalist(s)	Germán Chiaraviglio	Argentina	5.20m	
2nd place, silver medalist(s)	Lázaro Borges	Cuba	5.15m	
3rd place, bronze medalist(s)	Yankier Lara	Cuba	5.00m	
4	José Rodolfo Pacho	Ecuador	5.00m	
5	Víctor Castillero	Mexico	4.90m	
6	Pedro Daniel Figueroa	El Salvador	4.60m	
	Raúl Ríos	Mexico	NH	
	Xavier Boland	Jamaica	NH	

=== Long jump ===
Final – 15 August

Rank	Name	Nationality	Result	Notes
1st place, gold medalist(s)	David Registe	Dominica	8.06m (1.8 m/s))	
2nd place, silver medalist(s)	Jorge McFarlane	Peru	8.01m (1.0 m/s)	
3rd place, bronze medalist(s)	Yunior Díaz	Cuba	7.83m (1.3 m/s)	
4	Jhamal Bowen	Panama	7.79m (1.4 m/s)	
5	Emiliano Lasa	Uruguay	7.77m (-0.4 m/s)	
6	Raymond Higgs	Bahamas	7.76m (0.4 m/s)	
7	Álvaro Cortez	Chile	7.57m (0.8 m/s)	
8	La'Derick Ward	United States	7.54m (-0.8 m/s)	
9	Javier McFarlane	Peru	7.28m (0.7 m/s)	
10	Quincy Breell	Aruba	7.19m (0.6 m/s)	

=== Triple jump ===
Final – 16 August

Rank	Name	Nationality	Result	Notes
1st place, gold medalist(s)	Yordanys Durañona	Dominica	17.20m (-1.0 m/s)	
2nd place, silver medalist(s)	Samyr Lainé	Haiti	17.10m (0.2 m/s)	
3rd place, bronze medalist(s)	Lázaro Martínez	Cuba	16.53m (-0.1 m/s)	
4	Chris Carter	United States	16.50m (0.6 m/s)	
5	Kauam Bento	Brazil	16.43m (-0.1 m/s)	
6	Alberto Álvarez	Mexico	16.42m (-1.1 m/s)	
6	Jhon Murillo	Colombia	16.42m (-1.1 m/s)	
8	Álvaro Cortez	Chile	15.46m (-0.3 m/s)	

=== Shot put ===
Final – 16 August

Rank	Name	Nationality	Result	Notes
1st place, gold medalist(s)	Jordan Clarke	United States	20.57m	
2nd place, silver medalist(s)	Darlan Romani	Brazil	20.03m	
3rd place, bronze medalist(s)	Stephen Sáenz	Mexico	19.91m	
4	Raymond Brown	Jamaica	18.62m	
5	Aldo González	Bolivia	16.86m	
6	Delron Innis	Bahamas	15.26m	
7	Khyle Higgs	Bahamas	13.56m	

=== Discus throw ===
Final – 15 August

Rank	Name	Nationality	Result	Notes
1st place, gold medalist(s)	Jorge Fernández	Cuba	64.94m	
2nd place, silver medalist(s)	Jared Schuurmans	United States	59.90m	
3rd place, bronze medalist(s)	Ronald Julião	Brazil	59.40m	
4	Mario Cota	Mexico	57.64m	
5	Maximiliano Alonso	Chile	54.00m	
6	Khyle Higgs	Bahamas	38.39m	

=== Hammer throw ===
Final – 16 August

Rank	Name	Nationality	Result	Notes
1st place, gold medalist(s)	Roberto Janet	Cuba	73.94m	
2nd place, silver medalist(s)	Roberto Sawyer	Costa Rica	73.85m	
3rd place, bronze medalist(s)	Wagner Domingos	Brazil	73.77m	
4	Reinier Mejías	Cuba	72.94m	
5	Roberto Sáez	Chile	65.10m	
6	Humberto Mansilla	Chile	64.20m	
7	Diego Berríos	Guatemala	62.78m	
	Delron Innis	Bahamas	FOUL	

=== Javelin throw ===
Final – 16 August

Rank	Name	Nationality	Result	Notes
1st place, gold medalist(s)	Júlio César de Oliveira	Brazil	79.10m	
2nd place, silver medalist(s)	Craig Kinsley	United States	78.76m	
3rd place, bronze medalist(s)	Sean Furey	United States	77.23m	
4	Guillermo Martínez	Cuba	77.20m	
5	Dayron Márquez	Colombia	76.23m	
6	Víctor Fatecha	Paraguay	75.68m	
7	Osmany Laffita	Cuba	75.60m	
8	Juan José Méndez	Mexico	73.98m	
9	Albert Reynolds	Saint Lucia	68.85m	
10	David Ocampo	Mexico	67.62m	
11	Arley Ibargüen	Colombia	67.30m	

== Women's results ==
=== 100 meters ===
Heats – 15 August

Rank	Name	Nationality	Time	Notes
1	Audra Segree	Jamaica	11.56 (-1.4 m/s)	q
2	Ángela Tenorio	Ecuador	11.60 (-0.4 m/s)	q
3	Gayon Evans	Jamaica	11.71 (-0.4 m/s)	q
4	Lesline Gilzene	Jamaica	11.73 (-0.4 m/s)	q
4	Marecia Pemberton	Saint Kitts and Nevis	11.73 (-1.4 m/s)	q
6	María Alejandra Idrobo	Colombia	11.74 (-1.4 m/s)	q
7	María Victoria Woodward	Argentina	11.78 (-1.4 m/s)	q
8	Genoiska Cancel	Puerto Rico	11.83 (-1.4 m/s)	q
9	Beatriz Cruz	Puerto Rico	11.94 (-0.4 m/s)	
10	Shantely Scott	Costa Rica	12.08 (-1.4 m/s)	
11	Sunayna Wahi	Suriname	12.24 (-0.4 m/s)	
12	Noelia Vera	Paraguay	12.83 (-1.4 m/s)	
13	Beatriz Flamenco	El Salvador	12.90 (-0.4 m/s)	
14	Beatrice Derose	Haiti	14.75 (-0.4 m/s)	

Final – 15 August – Wind: -2.5 m/s

Rank	Name	Nationality	Time	Notes
1st place, gold medalist(s)	Ángela Tenorio	Ecuador	11.48	
2nd place, silver medalist(s)	Audra Segree	Jamaica	11.57	
3rd place, bronze medalist(s)	Gayon Evans	Jamaica	11.72	
4	María Victoria Woodward	Argentina	11.73	
5	Marecia Pemberton	Saint Kitts and Nevis	11.74	
6	María Alejandra Idrobo	Colombia	11.82	
7	Lesline Gilzene	Jamaica	11.83	
8	Genoiska Cancel	Puerto Rico	11.88	

=== 200 meters ===
Heats – 16 August

Rank	Name	Nationality	Time	Notes
1	Allison Peter	U.S. Virgin Islands	23.31 (-0.1 m/s)	q
2	Samantha Curtis	Jamaica	23.50 (-0.1 m/s)	q
3	Ángela Tenorio	Ecuador	23.53 (-0.1 m/s)	q
3	Audra Segree	Jamaica	23.53 (-0.1 m/s)	q
5	Arialis Gandulla	Cuba	23.56 (-0.1 m/s)	q
6	María Alejandra Idrobo	Colombia	23.68 (-0.1 m/s)	q
7	Venicha Baker	Jamaica	23.93 (-0.1 m/s)	q
8	Shantely Scott	Costa Rica	24.08 (-0.1 m/s)	q
9	Genoiska Cancel	Puerto Rico	24.10 (-0.1 m/s)	
10	María Victoria Woodward	Argentina	24.17 (-0.1 m/s)	
11	María Fernanda Mackena	Chile	24.56 (-0.1 m/s)	
12	Sunayna Wahi	Suriname	25.36 (-0.1 m/s)	
13	Noelia Vera	Paraguay	26.73 (-0.1 m/s)	

Final – 16 August – Wind: +2.1 m/s

Rank	Name	Nationality	Time	Notes
1st place, gold medalist(s)	Ángela Tenorio	Ecuador	22.82 w	
2nd place, silver medalist(s)	Allison Peter	U.S. Virgin Islands	23.03 w	
3rd place, bronze medalist(s)	Audra Segree	Jamaica	23.15 w	
4	Arialis Gandulla	Cuba	23.15 w	
5	Samantha Curtis	Jamaica	23.40 w	
6	María Alejandra Idrobo	Colombia	23.92 w	
7	Shantely Scott	Costa Rica	23.99 w	
8	Venicha Baker	Jamaica	24.01 w	

=== 400 meters ===
Heats – 15 August

Rank	Name	Nationality	Time	Notes
1	Daysiurami Bonne	Cuba	52.59	q
2	Bobby-Gaye Wilkins	Jamaica	52.60	q
3	Kineke Alexander	Saint Vincent and the Grenadines	52.68	q
4	Yaimeisi Borlot	Cuba	53.28	q
5	Anastasia Le-Roy	Jamaica	53.70	q
6	Gilda Casanova	Cuba	54.07	q
7	Jennifer Padilla	Colombia	54.49	q
8	Nercely Soto	Venezuela	54.89	q
9	María Fernanda Mackena	Chile	55.69	
10	Jonique Day	Jamaica	56.50	
11	Natrena Hooper	Guyana	58.38	
12	Fátima Amarilla	Paraguay	58.95	

Final – 16 August

Rank	Name	Nationality	Time	Notes
1st place, gold medalist(s)	Anastasia Le-Roy	Jamaica	51.28	
2nd place, silver medalist(s)	Daysiurami Bonne	Cuba	51.78	
3rd place, bronze medalist(s)	Bobby-Gaye Wilkins	Jamaica	51.84	
4	Kineke Alexander	Saint Vincent and the Grenadines	51.94	
5	Gilda Casanova	Cuba	52.75	
6	Yaimeisi Borlot	Cuba	53.44	
7	Jennifer Padilla	Colombia	55.91	
	Nercely Soto	Venezuela	DNF	

=== 800 meters ===
Final – 16 August

Rank	Name	Nationality	Time	Notes
1st place, gold medalist(s)	Rose Mary Almanza	Cuba	2:03.56	
2nd place, silver medalist(s)	Sahily Diago	Cuba	2:04.30	
3rd place, bronze medalist(s)	Gabriela Medina	Mexico	2:04.47	
4	Charlene Lipsey	United States	2:04.58	
5	Cristina Guevara	Mexico	2:04.59	
6	Gabriela Eleno	Mexico	2:09.54	
	Mariana Barrios	Mexico	DNF	
	Fátima Amarilla	Paraguay	DNF	

=== 1500 meters ===
Final – 15 August

Rank	Name	Nationality	Time	Notes
1st place, gold medalist(s)	Cristina Guevara	Mexico	4:24.37	
2nd place, silver medalist(s)	María Mancebo	Dominican Republic	4:25.48	
3rd place, bronze medalist(s)	Gabriela Eleno	Mexico	4:28.89	
4	Estefany Paredes	Mexico	4:49.49	

=== 5000 meters ===
Final – 15 August

Rank	Name	Nationality	Time	Notes
1st place, gold medalist(s)	Brenda Flores	Mexico	16:54.60	
2nd place, silver medalist(s)	Margarita Hernández	Mexico	17:06.27	
3rd place, bronze medalist(s)	Anayelli Navarro	Mexico	17:10.13	
4	Sandra López	Mexico	17:16.24	
5	Maritza Arenas	Mexico	17:17.30	
6	Tatiele de Carvalho	Brazil	17:30.49	
7	Martha Iris Vázquez	Mexico	17:36.20	
8	Dailín Belmonte	Cuba	17:53.20	

=== 3000 meters steeplechase ===
Final – 16 August

Rank	Name	Nationality	Time	Notes
1st place, gold medalist(s)	Zulema Arenas	Peru	10:21.05	
2nd place, silver medalist(s)	María Mancebo	Dominican Republic	10:46.05	
3rd place, bronze medalist(s)	Cinthya Paucar	Peru	11:02.55	
4	Sara Prieto	Mexico	11:08.24	
5	Esmeralda Rebollo	Mexico	11:11.45	
6	Azucena Ríos	Mexico	11:47.01	
7	Aldy Gonzales	Honduras	13:00.82	

=== 100 meters hurdles ===
Heats – 16 August

Rank	Name	Nationality	Time	Notes
1	Yvette Lewis	Panama	12.99 (0.6 m/s)	q
2	Shermaine Williams	Jamaica	13.02 (0.1 m/s)	q
3	Lina Flórez	Colombia	13.22 (0.6 m/s)	q
4	Belkis Milanes	Cuba	13.25 (0.6 m/s)	q
5	Brigitte Merlano	Colombia	13.28 (0.1 m/s)	q
6	Fabiana Moraes	Brazil	13.32 (0.1 m/s)	q
7	Kierre Beckles	Barbados	13.33 (0.1 m/s)	q
8	Andrea Bliss	Jamaica	13.44 (0.6 m/s)	q
9	Beatriz Flamenco	El Salvador	15.20 (0.6 m/s)	
	Litzi Vázquez	Puerto Rico	DNF (0.1 m/s)	

Final – 16 August – Wind: +0.9 m/s

Rank	Name	Nationality	Time	Notes
1st place, gold medalist(s)	Yvette Lewis	Panama	12.86 (0.9 m/s)	
2nd place, silver medalist(s)	Shermaine Williams	Jamaica	12.91 (0.9 m/s)	
3rd place, bronze medalist(s)	Andrea Bliss	Jamaica	13.18 (0.9 m/s)	
4	Fabiana Moraes	Brazil	13.20 (0.9 m/s)	
5	Brigitte Merlano	Colombia	13.29 (0.9 m/s)	
6	Belkis Milanes	Cuba	13.29 (0.9 m/s)	
	Kierre Beckles	Barbados	DNF (0.9 m/s)	
	Lina Flórez	Colombia	FS (0.9 m/s)	

=== 400 meters hurdles ===
Final – 16 August

Rank	Name	Nationality	Time	Notes
1st place, gold medalist(s)	Zudikey Rodríguez	Mexico	55.78	
2nd place, silver medalist(s)	Zuriam Hechavarria	Cuba	56.54	
3rd place, bronze medalist(s)	Nickiesha Wilson	Jamaica	56.64	
4	Shevon Stoddart	Jamaica	56.88	
5	Déborah Rodríguez	Uruguay	58.35	
6	Yadira Moreno	Colombia	1:01.12	
7	Yulieth Caballero	Colombia	1:02.55	

=== High jump ===
Final – 15 August

Rank	Name	Nationality	Result	Notes
1st place, gold medalist(s)	Levern Spencer	Saint Lucia	1.88m	
2nd place, silver medalist(s)	Jeannelle Scheper	Saint Lucia	1.85m	
3rd place, bronze medalist(s)	Tynita Butts	United States	1.80m	
4	Kashany Ríos	Panama	1.80m	
4	Priscilla Frederick	Antigua and Barbuda	1.80m	
4	Daniellys Dutil	Cuba	1.80m	
4	Susane Jackson	United States	1.80m	
8	Sheree Francis-Ruff	Jamaica	1.70m	

=== Pole vault ===
Final – 16 August

Rank	Name	Nationality	Result	Notes
1st place, gold medalist(s)	Valeria Chiaraviglio	Argentina	4.00m	
2nd place, silver medalist(s)	Jocelyn Villegas	Mexico	3.50m	
	Martha Olimpia Villalobos	Mexico	NH	

=== Long jump ===
Final – 15 August

Rank	Name	Nationality	Result	Notes
1st place, gold medalist(s)	Yulimar Rojas	Venezuela	6.53m w (2.1 m/s)	
2nd place, silver medalist(s)	Irisdaymi Herrera	Cuba	6.43m (1.5 m/s)	
3rd place, bronze medalist(s)	Vanessa Seles	Brazil	6.36m w (2.2 m/s)	
4	Alitta Boyd	United States	6.26m (0.1 m/s)	
5	Valeria Quispe	Bolivia	5.93m w (2.7 m/s)	

=== Triple jump ===
Final – 16 August

Rank	Name	Nationality	Result	Notes
1st place, gold medalist(s)	Mabel Gay	Cuba	14.53m (-0.1 m/s)	
2nd place, silver medalist(s)	Yarianna Martínez	Cuba	14.29m (-0.5 m/s)	
3rd place, bronze medalist(s)	Dailenys Alcántara	Cuba	14.29m (0.8 m/s)	
4	Keila Costa	Brazil	13.95m (0.5 m/s)	
5	Tori Franklin	United States	13.49m (1.3 m/s)	
6	Ayanna Alexander	Trinidad and Tobago	13.49m (1.3 m/s)	
7	Toni Smith	United States	13.07m (1.2 m/s)	
8	Valeria Quispe	Bolivia	12.63m (0.1 m/s)	
9	Natrena Hooper	Guyana	12.30m (0.1 m/s)	

=== Shot put ===
Final – 15 August

Rank	Name	Nationality	Result	Notes
1st place, gold medalist(s)	Yaniuvis López	Cuba	17.96m	
2nd place, silver medalist(s)	Natalia Ducó	Chile	17.88m	
3rd place, bronze medalist(s)	Brittany Smith	United States	17.60m	
4	Kearsten Peoples	United States	16.92m	
5	Anyela Rivas	Colombia	16.21m	
6	Keely Pinho	Brazil	16.18m	
7	Saily Viart	Cuba	16.13m	
8	Geneva Greaves	Jamaica	14.47m	
9	Devene Brown	Jamaica	14.18m	
10	Gleneve Grange	Jamaica	13.35m	

=== Discus throw ===
Final – 16 August

Rank	Name	Nationality	Result	Notes
1st place, gold medalist(s)	Denia Caballero	Cuba	62.19m	
2nd place, silver medalist(s)	Fernanda Raquel Borges	Brazil	60.87m	
3rd place, bronze medalist(s)	Karen Gallardo	Chile	58.24m	
4	Yanisley Collado	Cuba	57.47m	
5	Bárbara Rocío Comba	Argentina	57.11m	
6	Elizabeth Podominick	United States	56.14m	
7	Tarasue Barnett	Jamaica	54.91m	
8	Gleneve Grange	Jamaica	52.69m	
	Yaimí Pérez	Cuba	FOUL	
	Shanice Brown	Jamaica	FOUL	

=== Hammer throw ===
Final – 15 August

Rank	Name	Nationality	Result	Notes
1st place, gold medalist(s)	Gwen Berry	United States	72.04m	
2nd place, silver medalist(s)	Yipsi Moreno	Cuba	69.65m	
3rd place, bronze medalist(s)	Brittany Smith	United States	69.50m	
4	Arianni Vichy	Cuba	68.74m	
5	Yirisleydi Ford	Cuba	68.44m	
6	Jennifer Dahlgren	Argentina	68.37m	
7	Johana Moreno	Colombia	64.13m	
8	Paola Miranda	Paraguay	59.08m	
9	Odette Palma	Chile	56.67m	
	Rachel Peña	Puerto Rico	FOUL	

=== Javelin throw ===
Final – 15 August

Rank	Name	Nationality	Result	Notes
1st place, gold medalist(s)	Jucilene de Lima	Brazil	59.86m	
2nd place, silver medalist(s)	Lismania Muñoz	Cuba	58.40m	
3rd place, bronze medalist(s)	Coralys Ortiz	Puerto Rico	58.20m	
4	Abigail Gómez	Mexico	52.25m	
5	María Mello	Uruguay	51.04m	
6	Laura Paredes	Paraguay	48.80m	
