= Athletics at the 2005 Summer Universiade – Men's hammer throw =

The men's hammer throw event at the 2005 Summer Universiade was held on 20 August in İzmir, Turkey.

== Results ==
| Rank | Athlete | Nationality | #1 | #2 | #3 | #4 | #5 | #6 | Result | Notes |
|---|---|---|---|---|---|---|---|---|---|---|
| 1st place, gold medalist(s) | Vadim Devyatovskiy | Belarus | x | x | 73.21 | x | 77.05 | 79.13 | 79.13 | |
| 2nd place, silver medalist(s) | Eşref Apak | Turkey | 75.02 | x | x | 76.18 | x | 72.13 | 76.18 | |
| 3rd place, bronze medalist(s) | Valeriy Sviatokha | Belarus | 73.14 | 74.71 | 74.17 | 72.50 | 73.65 | 72.13 | 74.71 | |
| 4 | David Söderberg | Finland | 73.10 | 73.55 | 73.51 | 70.89 | 73.50 | 71.43 | 73.55 | |
| 5 | Grigoriy Khatantsev | Russia | 70.88 | 72.54 | 70.06 | 68.83 | 71.86 | 69.11 | 72.54 | |
| 6 | Frédéric Pouzy | France | x | 67.82 | 70.31 | 68.65 | 68.91 | 70.32 | 70.32 | |
| 7 | Jarkko Paljakka | Finland | x | 67.36 | 69.07 | 64.66 | 70.20 | x | 70.20 | |
| 8 | Erik Jiménez | Cuba | x | 68.79 | 68.28 | x | x | x | 68.79 | |
| 9 | Andrew Frost | Great Britain | 65.66 | 67.18 | 67.36 | | | | 67.36 | |
| 10 | Jim Steacy | Canada | 65.80 | 66.51 | 65.75 | | | | 66.51 | |
| 11 | Ainārs Vaičulens | Latvia | 59.97 | x | 60.08 | | | | 60.08 | |
| 12 | Li Zhenhua | China | x | 57.76 | 57.19 | | | | 57.76 | |
| 13 | Bakhodur Safarov | Tajikistan | x | 52.45 | 51.32 | | | | 52.45 | |
| | Mohamed Omar Al-Khatib | United Arab Emirates | | | | | | | DNS | |
