= Roberto Skyers =

Cuban sprinter

Personal information
- Full name: Roberto Skyers Pérez
- Born: 12 November 1991 (age 34) Minas, Camagüey Province, Cuba
- Height: 1.83 m (6 ft 0 in)
- Weight: 83 kg (183 lb)

Sport
- Country: Cuba
- Sport: Athletics
Medal record
Men's athletics
Representing Cuba
Pan American Games
Gold medal – first place	2011 Guadalajara	200 m
Central American and Caribbean Games
Gold medal – first place	2014 Xalapa	200 m
- Updated on 12 December 2014

Roberto Skyers Pérez (born 12 November 1991) is a Cuban track and field athlete who competes in the sprinting events. He won the gold medal in the 200 metres at the 2011 Pan American Games. His personal bests are 9.98 seconds for the 100 metres and 20.02 seconds for the 200 m.

== Career ==
At the age of seventeen, he ran a national junior record of 20.24 seconds for the 200 metres that year and also ran a 100 metres best of 10.31 seconds. This represented a significant improvement upon his 2008 best of 21.65 seconds and led to athletics statisticians A. Lennart Julin and Mirko Jalava identifying him as one of the world's most promising sprinters. Skyers began competing internationally in 2009, making his debut at the ALBA Games, where he claimed the 200 m title. He ran in the Cuban 4×100 metres relay team at the 2009 Central American and Caribbean Championships in Athletics, but the quartet failed to finish the race. He claimed the 200 m national title at the Barrientos Memorial in June.

Having finished third at the 2010 Barrientos meet and improved his 100 m to 10.29 seconds, Skyers represented Cuba in that event at the 2010 Ibero-American Championships and went on to place fourth overall. He completed a 200 m and relay double at the 2011 ALBA Games the following July. He established himself on the regional scene at the 2011 Pan American Games: although he suffered a muscular twitch during the heats of the relay, he ran in the 200 m a few hours later and was the surprise gold medalist in the event, defeating Lansford Spence and Bruno de Barros.

== Personal bests ==
- 100 m: 9.98 s (wind: +1.0 m/s) – Camagüey, Cuba, 22 February 2019
- 200 m: 20.02 s NR (wind: +0.3 m/s) – Toronto, Canada, 24 July 2015

== International competitions ==
Year	Competition	Venue	Position	Event	Notes
Representing Cuba
2009	ALBA Games	Havana, Cuba	1st	200 m	20.27 s w (+2.3 m/s)
2009	ALBA Games	Havana, Cuba	1st	4 × 100 m relay	39.77 s
2009	Central American and Caribbean Championships	Havana, Cuba	–	4 × 100 m relay	DNF
2010	Ibero-American Championships	San Fernando, Spain	4th	100 m	10.40 s (-0.2 m/s)
2011	ALBA Games	Barquisimeto, Venezuela	1st	200 m	20.44 s w (+2.4 m/s)
2011	ALBA Games	Barquisimeto, Venezuela	1st	4 × 100 m relay	39.34 s
2011	Pan American Games	Guadalajara, Mexico	1st	200 m	20.37 s A (-1.0 m/s)
2011	Pan American Games	Guadalajara, Mexico	4th	4 × 100 m relay	39.75 s A
2012	Olympic Games	London, United Kingdom	4th (h)	200 m	20.66 s (+1.1 m/s)
2014	World Relays	Nassau, Bahamas	10th (B)	4 × 100 m relay	38.60
2014	Pan American Sports Festival	Mexico City, Mexico	2nd	200m	20.28 A (+0.6 m/s)
2014	Central American and Caribbean Games	Xalapa, Mexico	1st	200m	20.47 A (-1.8 m/s)
2015	World Championships	Beijing, China	12th (sf)	200 m	20.23
2016	Ibero-American Championships	Rio de Janeiro, Brazil	2nd (h)	200 m	20.69^{1}
2016	Ibero-American Championships	Rio de Janeiro, Brazil	3rd	4 × 100 m relay	38.93
2016	Olympic Games	Rio de Janeiro, Brazil	22nd (sf)	200 m	20.60
2016	Olympic Games	Rio de Janeiro, Brazil	13th (h)	4 × 100 m relay	38.47
2017	World Championships	London, United Kingdom	13th (h)	4 × 100 m relay	39.01
2018	Central American and Caribbean Games	Barranquilla, Colombia	5th	4 × 100 m relay	39.03
2019	Pan American Games	Lima, Peru	7th	200 m	20.67
2019	Pan American Games	Lima, Peru	7th	4 × 100 m relay	39.19

^{1}Did not finish in the semifinals
