= Yameisi Borlot =

Cuban sprinter

Personal information
- Full name: Yameisi Borlot Simón
- Born: 18 February 1991 (age 35) Santiago de Cuba, Cuba

Sport
- Country: Cuba
- Sport: Athletics
- Updated on 5 January 2015

Yameisi Borlot Simón (also Yaneisi or Yaimeisi; born 18 February 1991) is a Cuban sprinter. She competed in the 4 × 400 m relay event at the 2012 Summer Olympics.

== Personal bests ==
- 200 m: 24.06 s (wind: +2.0 m/s) – Barquisimeto, Venezuela, 29 July 2011
- 400 m: 52.49 s – Havana, Cuba, 29 June 2012

== Achievements ==
Year	Competition	Venue	Position	Event	Notes
Representing Cuba
2009	ALBA Games	Havana, Cuba	3rd	400 m	55.43 s
2009	ALBA Games	Havana, Cuba	2nd	4 × 400 m relay	3:40.42 min
2011	ALBA Games	Barquisimeto, Venezuela	3rd	200 m	24.06 s (wind: +2.0 m/s)
2011	ALBA Games	Barquisimeto, Venezuela	1st	4 × 100 m relay	45.33 s
2012	Olympic Games	London, United Kingdom	6th (h)	4 × 400 m relay	3:27.41 min
2014	Pan American Sports Festival	Mexico City, Mexico	6th	400m	53.44 A
2014	Central American and Caribbean Games	Xalapa, Mexico	1st	4 × 400 m relay	3:29.69 A
