= Dailín Belmonte =

Cuban long-distance runner

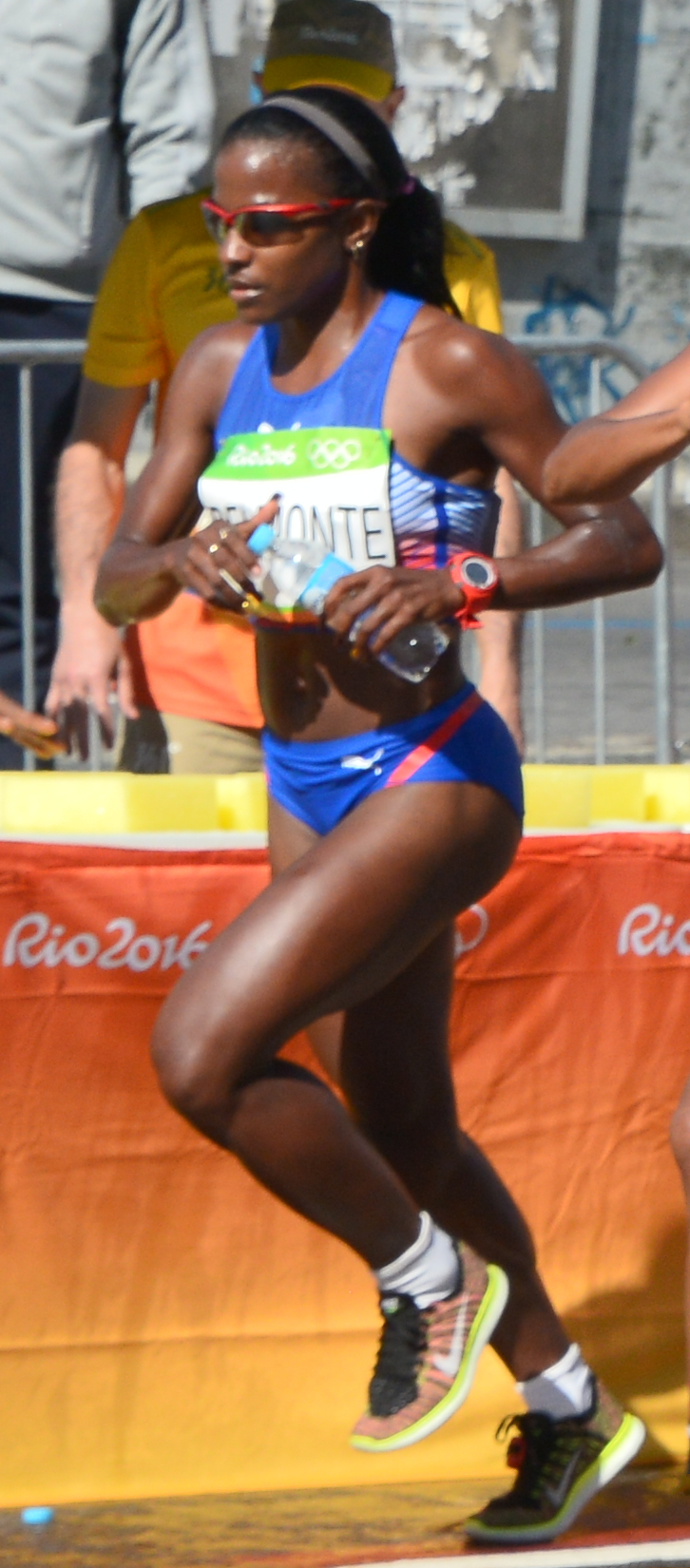
- Belmonte at the 2016 Olympics

Personal information
- Full name: Dailín Belmonte Torres
- Born: October 15, 1985 (age 40) Santiago de Cuba, Cuba
- Education: Universidad de Oriente
- Height: 158 cm (5 ft 2 in)
- Weight: 52 kg (115 lb)

Sport
- Country: Cuba
- Sport: Athletics
- Events: 3000 to half marathon and marathon
- Coached by: Rafael McBeath

Achievements and titles
- Personal bests: 3000 m – 9:39.9 (2005); 5000 m – 16:14.01 (2011); 10,000 m – 34:16.6 (2008); HM – 1:14:11 (2009); Mar – 2:38:08 (2012)
Medal record
Representing Cuba
CAC Championships
Gold medal – first place	2009 Havana	Half marathon
Silver medal – second place	2009 Havana	10,000 m
- Updated on 1 January 2015

Dailín Belmonte Torres (born October 15, 1985) is a Cuban long-distance runner who specialises in marathon running. She won two medals at the 2009 Central American and Caribbean Championships in Athletics and was fourth at the 2011 Pan American Games. She has a personal best of 2:38:08 hours for the marathon, set at the 2012 Summer Olympics.

== Biography ==
Belmonte began to establish herself on the track in 2003, when she ran a national junior record of 35:20.14 minutes for the 10,000 metres. The 2005 ALBA Games was hosted in Havana and she ran in both the 5000 metres and the 10,000 m, picking up bronze and silver medals respectively. She made her half marathon debut in Havana in February 2007 and ran a time of 76:48 minutes. She won another track silver at the 2007 ALBA Games in the 10,000 m and won the 5000 m at the Barrientos Memorial. In November she won the Marabana half marathon. She stepped up to the marathon distance in running a time of 2:47:56 hours in February,

Belmonte ran a half marathon best of 74:11 minutes in February 2009, then moved up to fourth on the Cuban all-time lists with a run of 2:39:57 hours in Santa Clara, Cuba. At the 2009 Central American and Caribbean Championships in Athletics, held in Havana, she topped the half marathon podium and claimed second in the 10,000 m behind fellow Cuban Yudileyvis Castillo. She ended her season with a half marathon win at the Marabana. She was the 5000 m champion at the Barrientos Memorial in 2010. In the marathon that year, she won at the Olimpiada del Deporte Cubano and was runner-up at the Panama City Marathon.

She completed a half marathon/10,000 m double at the 2011 ALBA Games in Barquisimeto. Her best marathon time of the season came in Artemisa, where she won in 2:41:57 hours. She gained her selection for the 2011 Pan American Games and she came fourth in that race, behind Peru's Gladys Tejeda. She was fourth at the 2012 Madrid Marathon and her time of 2:41:07 was enough to gain a place on the Cuban Olympic team. She ran a personal best at the 2012 London Olympics, placing 69th. She finished 102nd at the 2016 Olympics.

== Achievements ==
Year	Competition	Venue	Position	Event	Notes
Representing Cuba
2005	ALBA Games	Havana, Cuba	3rd	5000 m	16:35.58
2005	ALBA Games	Havana, Cuba	2nd	10,000 m	35:10.2
2007	ALBA Games	Caracas, Venezuela	2nd	10,000 m	36:04.64
2009	Central American and Caribbean Championships	Havana, Cuba	2nd	10,000 m	36:40.32
2009	Central American and Caribbean Championships	Havana, Cuba	1st	Half marathon	1:20:21 hrs
2011	ALBA Games	Barquisimeto, Venezuela	1st	10,000 m	34:52.59
2011	ALBA Games	Barquisimeto, Venezuela	1st	Half marathon	1:14:45.84
2011	Pan American Games	Guadalajara, Mexico	4th	Marathon	2:43:39
2012	Olympic Games	London, United Kingdom	70th	Marathon	2:38:08 hrs PB
2014	Pan American Sports Festival	Mexico City, Mexico	8th	5000m	17:53.20 A
2014	Central American and Caribbean Games	Xalapa, Mexico	2nd	Marathon	2:42:01 A
2015	World Championships	Beijing, China	51st	Marathon	2:56:18
2018	Central American and Caribbean Games	Barranquilla, Colombia	2nd	Marathon	2:59:49
2019	Pan American Games	Lima, Peru	13th	10,000 m	35:01.01
2019	Pan American Games	Lima, Peru	10th	Marathon	2:45:08
