= Erik Jiménez =

Cuban hammer thrower (born 1981)

Personal information
- Full name: Erick Jiménez Chacón
- Born: 17 September 1981 (age 44)

Sport
- Country: Cuba
- Sport: Athletics
- Updated on 23 May 2013

Erik Jiménez (or Erick Jiménez; born 17 September 1981) is a Cuban retired hammer thrower.

He won the silver medal at the 2005 Central American and Caribbean Championships, and finished eighth at the 2005 Summer Universiade. He became Cuban champion in 2005.

His personal best throw is 75.38 metres, achieved in May 2005 in Havana.

== Achievements ==
| Year | Competition | Venue | Position | Event | Notes |
Representing Cuba
| 2005 | ALBA Games | Havana, Cuba | 1st | Hammer throw | 72.18 m |
| 2005 | Central American and Caribbean Championships | Nassau, Bahamas | 2nd | Hammer throw | 68.42 m |
| 2005 | Universiade | İzmir, Turkey | 8th | Hammer throw | 68.79 m |
