= 2023 ALBA Games =

Multi-sport event for countries of the ALBA community

V ALBA Games
- Host city: Caracas, Venezuela
- Nations: 11
- Athletes: ~3,500
- Events: 23 in 35 sports
- Opening: 21 April 2023
- Closing: 29 April 2023
- Opened by: Nicolás Maduro
- Main venue: Jorge Luis García Carneiro Stadium

The 2023 ALBA Games (Spanish: Juegos del ALBA Bicentenario) was a multi-sport event held between 21 and 29 April 2023 in ten different states of Venezuela. The games are organized by the Bolivarian Alliance for the Americas (ALBA).

== Participating nations ==
The following countries are expected to compete. The number of competitors qualified by each delegation is indicated in parentheses.

Amid the international isolation Russia is facing due to the invasion of Ukraine, ALBA invited Russia to participate at the 2023 Games. Russia sent 48 athletes to the 2023 ALBA Games and competed under its national flag.

- Antigua and Barbuda
- Bolivia (157)
- Cuba (368)
- Dominica
- Grenada
- Nicaragua (134)
- Saint Kitts and Nevis
- Saint Lucia
- Saint Vincent and the Grenadines
- Russia (48)
- Venezuela (806)

== Sports ==
- Archery
- Athletics
- Badminton
- Basketball
- Baseball
- Basque Pelota
- Beach volleyball
- Boxing
- Canoeing
- Cycling
  - BMX racing
  - Mountain biking
  - Road cycling
  - Track cycling
- Diving
- Fencing
- Football
- Gymnastics
  - Artistic gymnastics
  - Rhythmic gymnastics
- Handball
- Judo
- Karate
- Racquetball
- Rowing
- Shooting
- Softball
- Speed skating
- Swimming
- Taekwondo
- Tennis
- Table tennis
- Triathlon
- Volleyball
- Water polo
- Weightlifting
- Wrestling

== Medal table ==
* Host nation (Venezuela)

Rank	Nation	Gold	Silver	Bronze	Total
1	Venezuela (VEN)*	255	254	226	735
2	Cuba (CUB)	76	65	53	194
3	Russia (RUS)	36	24	10	70
4	Nicaragua (NCA)	7	25	113	145
5	Bolivia (BOL)	6	5	8	19
6	Dominica (DMA)	2	2	5	9
7	Saint Vincent and the Grenadines (VCT)	1	0	4	5
8	Saint Kitts and Nevis (SKN)	0	1	2	3
9	Antigua and Barbuda (ATG)	0	1	0	1
10	Grenada (GRN)	0	0	0	0
10	Saint Lucia (LCA)	0	0	0	0
Totals (11 entries)		383	377	421	1,181
