= Yuniel Hernández =

Cuban hurdler (born 1981)

Personal information
- Full name: Yuniel Hernández Solar
- Born: March 28, 1981 (age 45) Caimito, Artemisa
- Height: 1.85 m (6 ft 1 in)
- Weight: 86 kg (190 lb)

Sport
- Country: Cuba
- Sport: Athletics
Medal record
Representing Cuba
Pan American Games
Gold medal – first place	2003 Santo Domingo	110m hurdles
- Updated on 20 June 2013

Yuniel Hernández Solar (born 28 March 1981) is a Cuban hurdler.

His personal best time is 13.26 seconds, achieved in July 2001 in Salamanca when he was still only 20 years old. The result places him sixth (joint with Erik Batte) among Cuban 110 m hurdlers, behind Anier García, Dayron Robles, Emilio Valle, Alejandro Casañas and Yoel Hernández.

== Personal bests ==
Outdoor

- 200 m: 21.24 s (wind: +1.2 m/s) – (Cuba) Havana, 18 March 2005
- 110 m hurdles: 13.26 s (wind: +0.6 m/s) – (Spain) Salamanca, 18 March 2005

Indoor

- 50 m hurdles: 6.56 s – (Germany) Stuttgart, 4 February 2001
- 60 m hurdles: 7.54 s – (Greece) Pireás, 20 February 2002

== Achievements ==
Year	Competition	Venue	Position	Event	Notes
Representing Cuba
1997	Pan American Junior Championships	Havana, Cuba	6th	110 m hurdles	14.90 s (wind: -0.4 m/s)
1998	World Youth Games	Moscow, Russia	4th	110 m hurdles	14.19 s (wind: +0.0 m/s)
2000	World Junior Championships	Santiago, Chile	1st	110 m hurdles	13.60 s (wind: -0.1 m/s)
2001	World Championships	Edmonton, Canada	5th (sf)	110 m hurdles	13.56 s (wind: +0.8 m/s)
2001	Universiade	Beijing, China	1st (sf)	110 m hurdles	13.66 s (wind: -2.3 m/s)
2001	Universiade	Beijing, China	2nd (h)	4 × 100 m relay	39.34 s
2003	Pan American Games	Santo Domingo, Dominican Republic	1st	110 m hurdles	13.35 s (wind: -0.2 m/s)
2004	World Indoor Championships	Budapest, Hungary	5th	60 m hurdles	7.58 s
2004	Ibero-American Championships	Huelva, Spain	1st (h)	110 m hurdles	13.65 s (wind: -0.4 m/s)
2004	Olympic Games	Athens, Greece	4th (qf)	110 m hurdles	13.46 s (wind: +0.0 m/s)
2009	ALBA Games	Havana, Cuba	2nd	110 m hurdles	13.80 s (wind: +0.9 m/s)
2009	ALBA Games	Havana, Cuba	1st	4 × 100 m relay	39.77 s
2011	ALBA Games	Barquisimeto, Venezuela	1st	110 m hurdles	13.58 s (wind: +1.3 m/s)
2011	ALBA Games	Barquisimeto, Venezuela	1st	4 × 100 m relay	39.34 s
