= Diosmely Peña =

Cuban sprinter

Personal information
- Full name: Diosmelys Peña Contreras
- Born: 12 June 1985 (age 41) Consolación del Sur, Pinar del Río, Cuba

Sport
- Country: Cuba
- Sport: Athletics
Medal record
Representing Cuba
Pan American Games
Gold medal – first place	2011 Guadalajara	4x400m relay
- Updated on 25 June 2013

Diosmely Peña Contreras (born 12 June 1985) is a Cuban sprinter. She competed in the 4 × 400 m relay event at the 2012 Summer Olympics.

== Personal bests ==
- 400 m: 51.88 s A – Cali, Colombia, 4 July 2008
- 800 m: 2:02.41 min – Havana, Cuba, 28 May 2011
- 1000 m: 2:43.95 min – Havana, Cuba, 23 September 2011

== Achievements ==
Year	Competition	Venue	Position	Event	Notes
Representing Cuba
2005	ALBA Games	Havana, Cuba	4th	800 m	2:06.21 min
2008	Central American and Caribbean Championships	Cali, Colombia	5th	400 m	52.58 s A
2008	Central American and Caribbean Championships	Cali, Colombia	1st	4 × 400 m relay	3:27.97 min A
2009	ALBA Games	Havana, Cuba	2nd	800 m	2:06.74 min
2009	ALBA Games	Havana, Cuba	1st	4 × 400 m relay	3:35.04 min
2009	Central American and Caribbean Championships	Havana, Cuba	3rd	800 m	2:03.87 min
2009	World Championships	Berlin, Germany	8th	4 × 400 m relay	3:36.99 min
2011	ALBA Games	Barquisimeto, Venezuela	2nd	800 m	2:04.45 min
2011	ALBA Games	Barquisimeto, Venezuela	1st	4 × 400 m relay	3:34.91 min
2011	World Championships	Daegu, South Korea	4th (h)	4 × 400 m relay	3:26.74 min
2011	Pan American Games	Guadalajara, Mexico	1st	4 × 400 m relay	3:28.09 min A
2012	Olympic Games	London, United Kingdom	6th (h)	4 × 400 m relay	3:27.41 min
