= Alina Sánchez =

Argentinian physician (1986–2018

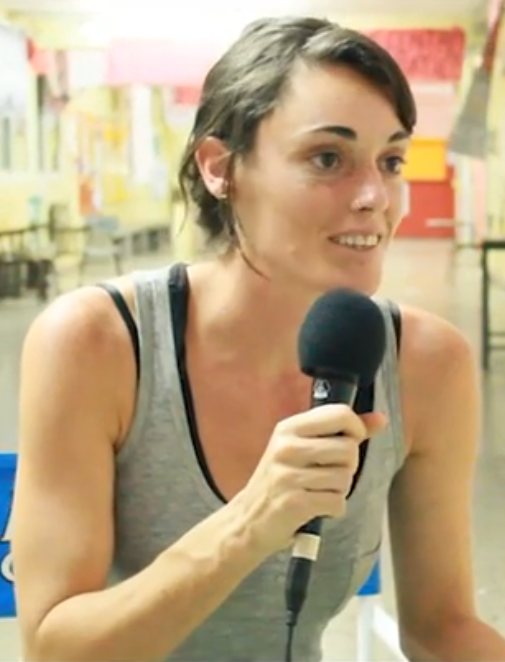
- In a 2014 interview
- Born: 4 September 1986; San Martín de los Andes, Neuquén, Argentina
- Died: 17 March 2018 (aged 31); Al-Hasakah
- Other names: Lêgerîn Çiya
- Occupations: Physician, volunteer
- Known for: Volunteering in the People's Defense Units and Women's Protection Units in Syria

Alina Sánchez (4 September 1986 – 17 March 2018) was an Argentinian physician best known for her volunteer work in the People's Defense Units and the Women's Protection Units as health personnel for the Kurdish militia.

== Life ==
Sanchez was born in southern Argentina. In 2006, while studying anthropology in Córdoba, she was given the opportunity to study in the Latin American School of Medicine in Cuba. There, she learned of community medicine and started participating in various community projects throughout Latin America.

In 2011, she went to Turkish Kurdistan for the first time before returning to Latin America, where in 2014 she received her medical degree.

From 2015 until her death she worked in Rojava as a medic, working to create a primary care system during the war. She was affiliated with the Kurdish Freedom Movement, and went by her Kurdish name Legerin Ciya.

She died in 2018, in a car crash in Al-Hasakah.

== Legacy ==
The Espacio Alina in Córdoba is used since 2020 as a space for popular education and a refuge for the memory of freedom fighters.
