= Aymée Martínez =

Cuban sprinter (born 1988)

Personal information
- Full name: Aymée Martínez Viart
- Born: November 17, 1988 (age 37) San Cristóbal, Pinar del Río
- Height: 1.68 m (5 ft 6 in)
- Weight: 52 kg (115 lb)

Sport
- Country: Cuba
- Sport: Athletics
- Event: 4 × 400 metres relay
Medal record
Representing Cuba
Pan American Games
| Gold medal – first place | 2007 Rio de Janeiro | 4x400m relay |
| Gold medal – first place | 2011 Guadalajara | 4x400m relay |
World Youth Championships
| Gold medal – first place | 2005 Marrakesh | 200m |
- Updated on 10 June 2013

Aymée Martínez Viart (Spanish pronunciation: [ajˈme maɾˈtines]; born 17 November 1988) is a Cuban sprinter who specializes in the 400 metres.

Her personal best time is 51.74 seconds, achieved during the heats at the 2007 World Championships in Osaka.

== Personal best ==
- 100 m: 11.79 s (wind: +0.0 m/s) – Havana, 17 June 2011
- 200 m: 22.99 s (wind: +0.7 m/s) – Marrakesh, 17 July 2005
- 400 m: 51.74 s – Osaka, 26 August 2007

== Competition record ==
| Year | Competition | Venue | Position | Event | Notes |
Representing Cuba
| 2005 | ALBA Games | Havana, Cuba | 2nd | 200 m | 23.67 s (wind: +0.0 m/s) |
| 2005 | ALBA Games | Havana, Cuba | 1st | 400 m | 52.6 s |
| 2005 | World Youth Championships | Marrakesh, Morocco | 1st | 200 m | 22.99 s |
| 2005 | World Youth Championships | Marrakesh, Morocco | 3rd | 400 m | 52.04 s |
| 2005 | Pan American Junior Championships | Windsor, Canada | 4th | 200 m | 23.38 s (wind: +2.0 m/s) |
| 2007 | ALBA Games | Caracas, Venezuela | 2nd | 200 m | 23.18 s (wind: +1.9 m/s) |
| 2007 | ALBA Games | Caracas, Venezuela | 1st | 4 × 100 m relay | 43.86 s |
| 2007 | Pan American Games | Rio de Janeiro, Brazil | 9th (sf) | 200 m | 23.37 s |
| 2007 | Pan American Games | Rio de Janeiro, Brazil | 1st | 4 × 400 m relay | 3:27.51 min |
| 2007 | World Championships | Osaka, Japan | 24th (sf) | 400 m | 57.77 s |
| 2007 | World Championships | Osaka, Japan | 7th | 4 × 400 m relay | 3:27.05 min |
| 2008 | Central American and Caribbean Championships | Cali, Colombia | 1st | 4 × 400 m relay | 3:27.97 min |
| 2011 | ALBA Games | Barquisimeto, Venezuela | 1st | 400 m | 52.01 s |
| 2011 | ALBA Games | Barquisimeto, Venezuela | 1st | 4 × 400 m relay | 3:34.91 min |
| 2011 | World Championships | Daegu, South Korea | 27th (h) | 400 m | 53.67 s |
| 2011 | World Championships | Daegu, South Korea | 10th (h) | 4 × 400 m relay | 3:26.74 min |
| 2011 | Pan American Games | Guadalajara, Mexico | 4th | 400 m | 52.09 s |
| 2011 | Pan American Games | Guadalajara, Mexico | 1st | 4 × 400 m relay | 3:28.09 min |
| 2012 | Ibero-American Championships | Barquisimeto, Venezuela | 5th | 400 m | 53.15 s |
| 2012 | Ibero-American Championships | Barquisimeto, Venezuela | 2nd | 4 × 400 m relay | 3:29.13 min |
| 2012 | Olympic Games | London, United Kingdom | 6th (h) | 4 × 400 m relay | 3:27.41 min |
