= Noel Ruíz =

Cuban sprinter

Personal information
- Born: 18 January 1987 (age 39) Santiago de Cuba Province, Cuba

Sport
- Country: Cuba
- Sport: Athletics
Medal record
Representing Cuba
Pan American Games
Gold medal – first place	2011 Guadalajara	4x400m relay
- Updated on 18 June 2013

Noel Ruíz Campanioni (born 18 January 1987) is a Cuban sprinter. He won the gold medal in the 4 × 400 metres relay at the 2011 Pan American Games.

== Personal bests ==
- 200 m: 20.70 s (wind: -0.9 m/s) – Havana, Cuba, 27 May 2011
- 400 m: 45.53 s – Barquisimeto, Venezuela, 27 July 2011

== Achievements ==
Year	Competition	Venue	Position	Event	Notes
Representing Cuba
2009	ALBA Games	Havana, Cuba	2nd	400 m	46.26 s
2009	ALBA Games	Havana, Cuba	1st	4 × 400 m relay	3:08.17 min
2009	Central American and Caribbean Championships	Havana, Cuba	6th (h)	400 m	47.92 s
2009	Central American and Caribbean Championships	Havana, Cuba	1st	4 × 400 m relay	3:03.26 min
2011	ALBA Games	Barquisimeto, Venezuela	1st	400 m	45.53 s PB
2011	ALBA Games	Barquisimeto, Venezuela	2nd	4 × 400 m relay	3:05.73 min
2011	Pan American Games	Guadalajara, Mexico	5th	400 m	45.69 s A
2011	Pan American Games	Guadalajara, Mexico	1st	4 × 400 m relay	2:59.43 min A
2012	Ibero-American Championships	Barquisimeto, Venezuela	3rd (h)	400 m	46.49 s
2012	Olympic Games	London, United Kingdom	–	4 × 400 m relay	DNF
