= 2009 Central American and Caribbean Championships in Athletics =

22nd Central American and Caribbean Championships
- Dates: 3 – 7 July
- Host city: Havana, Cuba
- Venue: Estadio Panamericano
- Level: Senior
- Events: 46
- Participation: 422 athletes from 27 nations
- Records set: 10 Championship records

The 2009 Central American and Caribbean Championships (Spanish: XXII Campeonato CAC Atletismo) was the twenty second edition of the tournament and was held between 3 and 7 July in Havana, Cuba.

== Event summary ==
The host country Cuba dominated the tournament, winning the most gold, silver, and bronze medals, and finishing with a total of 53 medals. Jamaica and Trinidad and Tobago were joint second with two gold, five silver and seven bronze medals. Colombia, Puerto Rico and Saint Kitts and Nevis also picked up two gold medals.

Championships records were broken in over a quarter of the athletics events, bringing a total of 11 new records. A handful of national records were also broken at the Championships.

Three athletes won double golds: Virgil Hodge won the 200 metres and 4×100 metres relay titles, Emmanuel Callender won the 100 metres then helped the Trinidad and Tobago relay team to victory, while Yudileyvis Castillo completed a 5000 and 10,000 metres double.

The 2009 edition of the Championships saw a number of nations win their first gold medal in the history of the competition. Shara Proctor took the long jump gold for Anguilla, Tahesia Harrigan won the British Virgin Islands' first gold in the 100 metres, and the Saint Kitts and Nevis relay team won the country's first ever gold medal in women's events.

A number of invitational guest athletes competed at the Championships. Although each country could only have two representatives, it could also enter additional athletes. Their performances, however, were not eligible for medals at the competition. Cuba entered a number of athletes and relay teams in this way. One such competitor, Arnie David Giralt, recorded 17.46 m in the triple jump, which was ultimately better than gold medallist Alexis Copello's best jump.

== Records ==
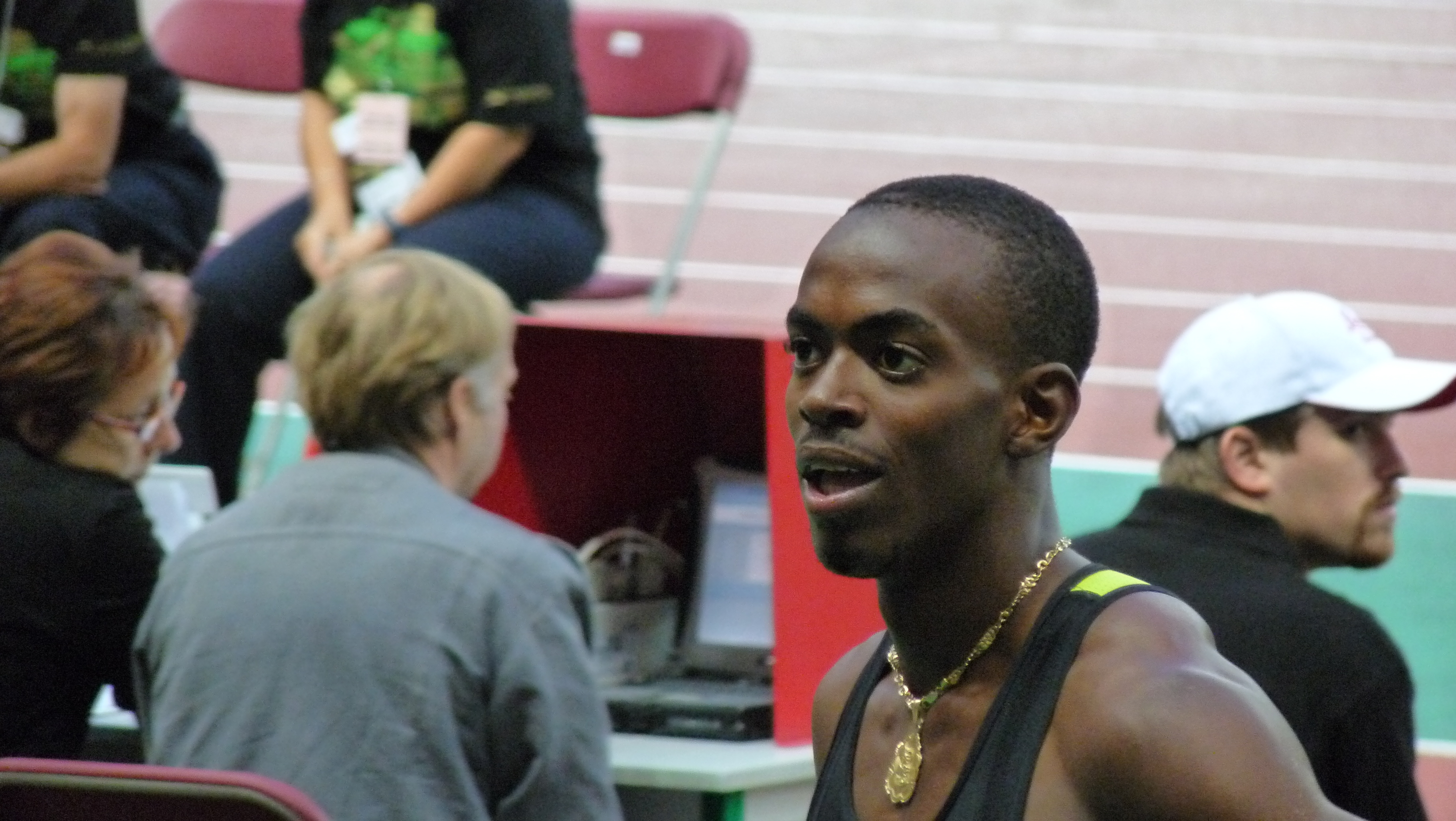
Cuban Alexis Copello (above) took the men's triple jump gold medal establishing a new championship record.

Key

Name	Event	Country	Record	Type
Yeimer López	800 metres	Cuba	1:45.56 min	CR
Ryan Brathwaite	110 metres hurdles	Barbados	13.43 s	CR
Javier Culson	400 metres hurdles	Puerto Rico	48.51 s	CR
José Alberto Sánchez	3000 metres steeplechase	Cuba	8:30.08 min	CR
Alexis Copello	Triple jump	Cuba	17.33 m	CR
Guillermo Martínez	Javelin throw	Cuba	82.16 m	CR
Leonel Suárez	Decathlon	Cuba	8654 pts	CR NR
Yudileyvis Castillo	10,000 metres	Cuba	33:50.68 min	CR
Tanika Liburd; Meritzer Williams; Tameka Williams; Virgil Hodge	4×100 metres relay	Saint Kitts and Nevis	43.53 s	NR
Kemar Hyman; Tyrell Cuffy; David Hamil; Carlos Morgan	4×100 metres relay	Cayman Islands	39.54 s	NR
Adrian Durant; Tabarie Henry; David Walters; Calvin Dascent	4×100 metres relay	United States Virgin Islands	39.89 s	NR
Yarisley Silva	Pole vault	Cuba	4.40 m	CR
Yargelis Savigne	Triple jump	Cuba	14.97 m	CR
Misleydis González	Shot put	Cuba	19.13 m	CR
Arasay Thondike	Hammer throw	Cuba	71.32 m	CR
Rosa Rodríguez	Hammer throw	Venezuela	69.06 m	NR

Key

AR — Area record • CR — Championship record • NR — National record

== Medal summary ==
=== Men ===
Event	Gold		Silver		Bronze	
100 metres	Emmanuel Callander (TRI)	10.08 s PB	Lerone Clarke (JAM)	10.08 s PB	Andrew Hinds (BAR)	10.12 s
200 metres	Nickel Ashmeade (JAM)	20.54 s	Rondel Sorrillo (TRI)	20.72 s	Ramone McKenzie (JAM)	20.74 s
400 metres	William Collazo (CUB)	44.96 s	Dane Hyatt (JAM)	45.57	Arismendy Peguero (DOM)	45.62 s
800 metres	Yeimer López (CUB)	1:45.56 min CR	Andy González (CUB)	1:46.62 min	Gavyn Nero (TRI)	1:47.51 min
1500 metres	Eduar Villanueva (VEN)	3:42.23 min	Maury Surel Castillo (CUB)	3:42.49 min	José Rivera (PUR)	3:42.86 min
5000 metres	José Alberto Sánchez (CUB)	14:23.73 min	Teodoro Vega (MEX)	14:28.06 min	Denides Vélez (PUR)	14:32.92 min
10,000 metres	Liván Luque (CUB)	29:55.16 min	Henry Jaens (CUB)	30:08.76 min	Teodoro Vega (MEX)	30:13.21 min
Half marathon	Henry Jaens (CUB)	1:06:32	Liván Luque (CUB)	1:07:26	Sean Trott (BER)	1:19:16
110 metres hurdles (+2.5 m/s wind)	Dayron Robles (CUB)	13.18 s	Ryan Brathwaite (BAR)	13.31 s (13.43 s CR in semis)	Dayron Capetillo (CUB)	13.39 s
400 metres hurdles	Javier Culson (PUR)	48.51 s CR	Félix Sánchez (DOM)	48.85 s	Jehue Gordon (TRI)	49.45 s
3000 metres steeplechase	José Alberto Sánchez (CUB)	8:30.08 min CR	José Peña (VEN)	8:51.03 min	Osmany Calzado (CUB)	8:54.15 min
High jump	James Grayman (ATG)	2.19 m	Warner Miller (COL)	2.19 m	Yordano Glemaud (CUB)	2.16 m
Pole vault	David Díaz (PUR)	5.00 m	Natanael Semeis (DOM)	4.80 m	César González (VEN)	4.80 m
Long jump	Osbourne Moxey (BAH)	7.96 m	Carlos Morgan (CYM)	7.87 m	Rudon Bastian (BAH)	7.57 m
Triple jump	Alexis Copello (CUB)	17.33 m CR	Yoandri Betanzos (CUB)	17.24 m	Chris Hercules (TRI)	15.91 m
Shot put	Carlos Véliz (CUB)	20.10 m	Reinaldo Proenza (CUB)	18.81 m	Yojer Medina (VEN)	17.05 m
Discus throw	Jorge Fernández (CUB)	61.79 m	Yunior Lastre (CUB)	59.80 m	Jason Morgan (JAM)	57.47 m
Hammer throw	Roberto Janet (CUB)	73.80 m	Noleisis Bicet (CUB)	72.46 m	Raúl Rivera (GTM)	66.02 m
Javelin throw	Guillermo Martínez (CUB)	82.16 m CR	Dayron Márquez (COL)	78.91 m	Arley Ibargüen (COL)	75.16 m
Decathlon	Leonel Suárez (CUB)	8654 pts CR NR	Yunior Díaz (CUB)	8013 pts	Claston Bernard (JAM)	7698 pts
20 km road walk	Walter Sandoval (SLV)	1:33:10 min	Allan Segura (CRI)	1:34:58 min	Yosley Soto (PUR)	1:36:19 min
4×100 metres relay	Trinidad and Tobago (TRI); Rondel Sorrillo; Emmanuel Callender; Jovon Toppin; Keston Bledman	38.73 s	Jamaica (JAM); Lerone Clarke; Kwayne Fisher; Rasheed Dwyer; Rayon Lawrence	39.31 s	Bahamas (BAH); Adrian Griffith; Derrick Atkins; Rodney Green; Karlton Rolle	39.45 s
4×400 metres relay	Cuba (CUB); William Collazo; Yeimer López; Omar Cisneros; Noel Ruíz	3:03.26 min	Dominican Republic (DOM); Félix Sánchez; Arismendy Peguero; Ramón Frías; Yoel Tapia	3:03.30 min	Jamaica (JAM); Dane Hyatt; Marvin Essor; Leford Green; Oral Thompson	3:04.09 min

=== Women ===
Event	Gold		Silver		Bronze	
100 metres	Tahesia Harrigan (IVB)	11.21 s	Semoy Hackett (TRI)	11.35 s	Carol Rodríguez (PUR)	11.38 s
200 metres	Virgil Hodge (SKN)	23.41 s	Roxana Díaz (CUB)	23.56 s	Reyare Thomas (TRI)	23.61 s
400 metres	Indira Terrero (CUB)	51.64 s	Norma González (COL)	51.90 s	Daisurami Bonne (CUB)	52.31 s
800 metres	Zulia Calatayud (CUB)	2:01.63 min	Pilar McShine (TRI)	2:02.79 min	Diosmely Peña (CUB)	2:03.87 min
1500 metres	Yadira Bataille (CUB)	4:23.82 min	Anayelli Navarro (MEX)	4:25.82 min	María Osorio (VEN)	4:29.83 min
5000 metres	Yudileyvis Castillo (CUB)	16:03.68 min	Yudisleidis Fuente (CUB)	16:08.63 min	Anayelli Navarro (MEX)	16:24.15 min
10,000 metres	Yudileyvis Castillo (CUB)	33:50.68 min CR	Dailín Belmonte (CUB)	36:40.32 min	—	—
Half marathon	Dailín Belmonte (CUB)	1:20:21	Yailén García (CUB)	1:21:50	—	—
100 metres hurdles	Anay Tejeda (CUB)	12.95 s	Aleesha Barber (TRI)	13.12 s	Tony Doyley (JAM)	13.13 s
400 metres hurdles	Nickiesha Wilson (JAM)	56.95 s	Yadisleidy Pedroso (CUB)	57.73 s	Nikita Tracey (JAM)	58.14 s
3000 metres steeplechase	Ángela Figueroa (COL)	10:03.44 min	Milena Pérez (CUB)	10:12.96 min	Yoslín Ocampo (CUB)	10:22.35 min
High jump	Lavern Spencer (LCA)	1.91 m	Sheree Francis (JAM)	1.88 m	Lesyaní Mayor (CUB)	1.76 m
Pole vault	Yarisley Silva (CUB)	4.40 m CR	Dailis Caballero (CUB)	4.10 m	—	—
Long jump	Shara Proctor (AIA)	6.61 m	Rhonda Watkins (TRI)	6.47 m	Tanika Liburd (SKN)	6.42 m
Triple jump	Yargelis Savigne (CUB)	14.97 m CR	Mabel Gay (CUB)	14.48 m	Kimberly Williams (JAM)	13.78 m
Shot put	Misleydis González (CUB)	19.13 m CR	Yaniuvis López (CUB)	18.81 m PB	Cleopatra Borel-Brown (TRI)	17.98 m
Discus throw	Yarelis Barrios (CUB)	62.10 m	Yarisley Collado (CUB)	61.33 m	María Cubillán (VEN)	55.57 m
Hammer throw	Arasay Thondike (CUB)	71.32 m CR	Rosa Rodríguez (VEN)	69.06 m NR	Johana Moreno (COL)	67.66 m
Javelin throw	Yainelis Ribeaux (CUB)	61.28 m	Osleidys Menéndez (CUB)	59.68 m	Laverne Eve (BAH)	58.69 m
Heptathlon	Gretchen Quintana (CUB)	5710 pts	Yarianny Argüelles (CUB)	5669 pts	Shianne Smith (BMU)	4988 pts
10 km road walk	Yanelis Conte (CUB)	46:46 min	Leisis Rodríguez (CUB)	47:42 min	Cristina López (SLV)	49:30 min
4×100 metres relay	Saint Kitts and Nevis (SKN); Tanika Liburd; Meritzer Williams; Tameka Williams; Virgil Hodge	43.53 s NR	Colombia (COL); Yomara Hinestroza; Felipa Palacios; Darlenis Obregón; Norma González	43.67 s	Trinidad and Tobago (TRI); Sasha Springer; Semoy Hackett; Reyare Thomas; Ayanna Hutchinson	43.75 s
4×400 metres relay	Cuba (CUB); Roxana Díaz; Daisurami Bonne; Susana Clement; Indira Terrero	3:29.94 min	Jamaica (JAM); Sonita Sutherland; Anastasia Le-Roy; Nickiesha Wilson; Nikita Tracey	3:34.02 min	Trinidad and Tobago (TRI); Karla Hope; Aleesha Barber; Melissa DeLeon; Natalie Dixon	3:35.18 min

== Medal table ==
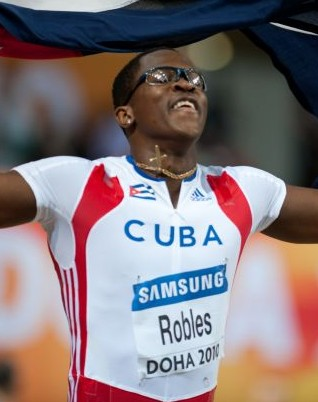
Dayron Robles' hurdles gold medal helped Cuba top the table.

* Host nation (Cuba)

Rank	Nation	Gold	Silver	Bronze	Total
1	Cuba (CUB)*	27	19	7	53
2	Jamaica (JAM)	2	5	7	14
2	Trinidad and Tobago (TTO)	2	5	7	14
4	Colombia (COL)	2	3	2	7
5	Puerto Rico (PUR)	2	0	4	6
6	Saint Kitts and Nevis (SKN)	2	0	1	3
7	Venezuela (VEN)	1	2	4	7
8	Bahamas (BAH)	1	0	3	4
9	El Salvador (ESA)	1	0	1	2
10	British Virgin Islands (IVB)	1	0	0	1
10	Commonwealth Games Federation (CGF)	1	0	0	1
10	Saint Lucia (LCA)	1	0	0	1
13	Dominican Republic (DOM)	0	3	1	4
14	Mexico (MEX)	0	2	2	4
15	Barbados (BAR)	0	1	1	2
16	Antigua and Barbuda (ATG)	0	1	0	1
16	Cayman Islands (CAY)	0	1	0	1
16	Costa Rica (CRC)	0	1	0	1
19	Bermuda (BER)	0	0	2	2
20	Guatemala (GUA)	0	0	1	1
Totals (20 entries)		43	43	43	129

== Participating nations ==
- Antigua and Barbuda (3)
- Aruba (2)
- Bahamas (26)
- Barbados (12)
- Belize (1)
- Bermuda (6)
- British Virgin Islands (9)
- Cayman Islands (6)
- Colombia (16)
- Costa Rica (14)
- Cuba (114)
- Dominican Republic (27)
- Grenada (3)
- Guatemala (10)
- Haiti (5)
- Honduras (4)
- Jamaica (33)
- Mexico (19)
- Netherlands Antilles (5)
- Nicaragua (3)
- Puerto Rico (26)
- Saint Kitts and Nevis (9)
- Saint Lucia (2)
- El Salvador (6)
- Trinidad and Tobago (28)
- United States Virgin Islands (9)
- Venezuela (24)

== See also ==
- 2009 in athletics (track and field)
