= Pan American Stadium (Havana) =

Multi-purpose stadium in Havana, Cuba

Coordinates: 23°9′27″N 82°19′00″W

Estadio Panamericano
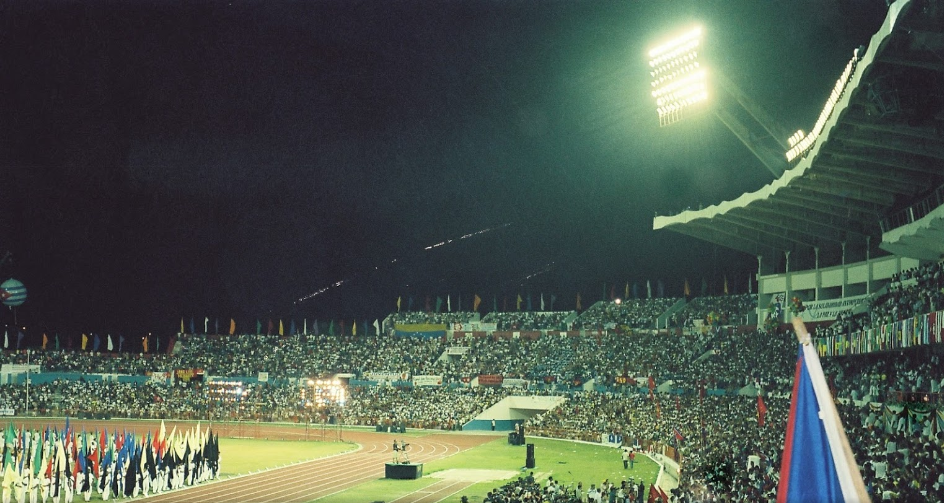
- Location: Havana, Cuba
- Owner: Government of Cuba
- Operator: Asociación de Fútbol de Cuba
- Capacity: 45,000
- Surface: Grass

Construction
- Built: 1990
- Opened: 1991
- Renovated: 2008

Tenants
- Cuba national football team

Pan American Stadium (Spanish: Estadio Panamericano) is a multi-use stadium located near Cojimar, a city ward of Havana, Cuba. It is used mostly for athletics.

== History ==
It was first used as the main stadium for the 1991 Pan American Games. The stadium opened August 1, 1991 and is able to hold 34,000.

It served as the site of an episode of the American version of Top Gear in 2016. The episode showed the stadium in disrepair and mostly abandoned.

=== Renovations ===
The stadium was renovated in 2008 with an artificial turf replacing the original grass turf.

== Structure ==
The stadium is surrounded by a park and faces nearby Boca de Cojimar (Havana Bay).

Seating is mainly open air with a partially covered grandstand to the east side.

Surrounding the football field is an oval track.

== See also ==
- Estadio Latinoamericano
- Estadio Pedro Marrero

Preceded by Indianapolis Motor Speedway; Indianapolis	Pan American Games; Opening and Closing Ceremonies; 1991	Succeeded by Estadio José María Minella; Mar del Plata
