= ALBA Games =

Multi-sport event

Map of member states (Bolivarian Alliance for the Americas (ALBA) members)

The ALBA Games (Spanish: Juegos Deportivos del ALBA) are a multi-sport event organized by the Bolivarian Alliance for the Americas (ALBA). The games are held once every two years. It was originally intended only for athletes of the ALBA member states but it has expanded to other countries in the Americas.

The first edition was held in 2005 in Havana, Cuba. Since then it was decided that Cuba and Venezuela will be switching editions every two years. However, there is a possibility that other countries may host the games in future editions.

Amid the international isolation Russia is facing due to the invasion of Ukraine, ALBA invited Russia to participate at the 2023 Games. Russia sent 48 athletes to the 2023 ALBA Games and competed under its national flag.

== Nations ==
ALBA's 10 member states are Antigua and Barbuda, Bolivia, Cuba, Dominica, Grenada, Nicaragua, Saint Kitts and Nevis, Saint Lucia, Saint Vincent and the Grenadines, and Venezuela.

- Antigua and Barbuda
- Bolivia
- Cuba
- Dominica
- Grenada
- Nicaragua
- Saint Kitts and Nevis
- Saint Lucia
- Saint Vincent and the Grenadines
- Venezuela

=== Observer members ===
- Iran
- Haiti
- Syria

=== Former members ===
- Honduras
- Ecuador

=== Guests ===
- Argentina
- Bahamas
- Barbados
- Brazil
- Chile
- Colombia
- Curaçao
- Dominican Republic
- El Salvador
- Guatemala
- Guyana
- Mexico
- Panama
- Paraguay
- Peru
- Puerto Rico
- Russia
- Spain
- Trinidad and Tobago

== Games ==
Year	Games	Host city	Host country	Dates	Athletes	Nations	Sports	Top Medalling Nation
2005	1	Havana	Cuba	17 June – 30 June	441	8	31	Cuba
2007	2	Caracas	Venezuela	27 April – 12 May	1,659	30	38	Cuba
2009	3	Havana	Cuba	15 April – 18 April	691	28	38	Cuba
2011	4	Barquisimeto	Venezuela	17 July – 30 July	~2,500	~23	35	Venezuela
2013	-	Quito	Ecuador	June – July	not held			
2015	-	Cochabamba	Bolivia	August – September	not held			
2023	5	Caracas	Venezuela	21–29 April	~3,500	11	33	Venezuela
2025	-	Roseau	Dominica	3–20 July	not held			
2026	6	Caracas	Venezuela	April,24-May,2				

- Not held in 2017, 2019, 2021 and 2025.

== 2023 ==
The athletes marched on behalf of their respective delegations representing Antigua and Barbuda, Bolivia, Cuba, Dominica, Grenada, Nicaragua, St. Kitts and Nevis, St. Lucia, St. Vincent and the Grenadines, Venezuela. Russia was due to take part in boxing, beach volleyball, karate, table tennis, trampolining, weightlifting and rhythmic gymnastics. The Games were set to see approximately 3,500 athletes from 11 countries compete in 35 sports. Russian athletes were invited as special guests thanks to an agreement signed by Russia and Venezuela in October 2021. Russia sent 48 athletes to the 2023 ALBA Games and competed under its national flag. Athletes from host nation Venezuela won the most medals.

=== Medal table ===
* Host nation (Venezuela)

Rank	Nation	Gold	Silver	Bronze	Total
1	Venezuela (VEN)*	255	254	226	735
2	Cuba (CUB)	76	65	53	194
3	Russia (RUS)	36	24	10	70
4	Nicaragua (NCA)	7	25	113	145
5	Bolivia (BOL)	6	5	8	19
6	Dominica (DMA)	2	2	5	9
7	Saint Vincent and the Grenadines (VCT)	1	0	4	5
8	Saint Kitts and Nevis (SKN)	0	1	2	3
9	Antigua and Barbuda (ATG)	0	1	0	1
10	Grenada (GRN)	0	0	0	0
10	Saint Lucia (LCA)	0	0	0	0
Totals (11 entries)		383	377	421	1,181

== All-time medal table ==
As of 2011 – note that records for the 2005 Games are incomplete. The 2023 ALBA Games medal table.

Rank	Nation	Gold	Silver	Bronze	Total
1	Cuba (CUB)	948	562	532	2,042
2	Venezuela (VEN)	611	771	695	2,077
3	Chile (CHI)	49	54	79	182
4	Ecuador (ECU)	43	77	110	230
5	Colombia (COL)	36	51	64	151
6	Russia (RUS)	30	22	9	61
7	El Salvador (SLV)	14	14	21	49
8	Mexico (MEX)	8	8	12	28
9	Bolivia (BOL)	7	15	35	57
10	Panama (PAN)	7	6	4	17
11	Dominican Republic (DOM)	6	23	48	77
12	Argentina (ARG)	6	7	16	29
13	Guatemala (GUA)	3	6	15	24
14	Nicaragua (NIC)	2	1	18	21
15	Peru (PER)	1	5	10	16
16	Brazil (BRA)	1	4	4	9
17	Honduras (HON)	1	1	5	7
18	Barbados (BAR)	0	2	2	4
19	Puerto Rico (PRI)	0	1	5	6
20	Costa Rica (CRI)	0	1	1	2
21	Guyana (GUY)	0	1	0	1
21	Spain (ESP)	0	1	0	1
23	Haiti (HAI)	0	0	2	2
Totals (23 entries)		1,773	1,633	1,687	5,093

== See also ==
- Athletics at the ALBA Games
- Pan American Games
- South American Games
