= Athletics at the 2006 Central American and Caribbean Games – Results =

These are the official results of the athletics competition at the 2006 Central American and Caribbean Games which took place on July 25–29, 2006 in Cartagena, Colombia.

== Men's results ==
=== 100 meters ===
Heats – July 25
Wind
Heat 1: +1.1 m/s, Heat 2: +1.1 m/s, Heat 3: +1.9 m/s, Heat 4: +1.4 m/s

Rank	Heat	Name	Nationality	Time	Notes
1	1	Jacey Harper	Trinidad and Tobago	10.5	Q
2	1	Juan Sainfleur	Dominican Republic	10.5	Q
3	1	Dion Crabbe	British Virgin Islands	10.6	Q
4	1	Luis Reyes	Cuba	10.6	
5	1	Daniel Bailey	Antigua and Barbuda	10.7	
6	1	Mario Trillo	Mexico	11.1	
1	2	Lerone Clarke	Jamaica	10.45	Q
2	2	Brendan Christian	Antigua and Barbuda	10.51	Q
3	2	Henry Vizcaíno	Cuba	10.59	Q
4	2	Daniel Grueso	Colombia	10.62	q
5	2	Rawle Greene	Guyana	10.69	
6	2	Stephen Johnson	Cayman Islands	10.99	
7	2	Jorge Luis Solórzano	Guatemala	11.05	
8	2	Aaron Oliva	Honduras	11.51	
1	3	Melvin Nero	Trinidad and Tobago	10.41	Q
2	3	Harlin Echavarría	Colombia	10.43	Q
3	3	Jamial Rolle	Bahamas	10.54	Q
4	3	Brian Mariano	Netherlands Antilles	10.57	q
5	3	Adrian Durant	United States Virgin Islands	10.79	
6	3	Tristan Hensley	Saint Kitts and Nevis	11.01	
	3	Andrew Hinds	Barbados	DNF	
	3	Marvin Bien-Aime	Haiti	DNS	
1	4	Churandy Martina	Netherlands Antilles	10.33	Q
2	4	Derrick Atkins	Bahamas	10.37	Q
3	4	Joel Báez	Dominican Republic	10.46	Q
4	4	Delwayne Delaney	Saint Kitts and Nevis	10.60	q
5	4	Kareem Streete-Thompson	Cayman Islands	10.64	q
6	4	Rolando Palacios	Honduras	10.73	
7	4	Christian Desulme	Haiti	11.06	
	4	Keita Cline	British Virgin Islands	DNF	

Semifinals – July 25
Wind:
Heat 1: +2.0 m/s, Heat 2: +1.8 m/s

Rank	Heat	Name	Nationality	Time	Notes
1	1	Churandy Martina	Netherlands Antilles	10.07	Q, GR
2	1	Derrick Atkins	Bahamas	10.08	Q, NR
3	1	Jacey Harper	Trinidad and Tobago	10.20	Q
4	2	Lerone Clarke	Jamaica	10.28	Q
5	1	Juan Sainfleur	Dominican Republic	10.31	q
6	2	Melvin Nero	Trinidad and Tobago	10.34	Q
7	2	Jamial Rolle	Bahamas	10.35	Q
8	1	Dion Crabbe	British Virgin Islands	10.36	q
9	2	Harlin Echavarría	Colombia	10.39	
10	2	Brendan Christian	Antigua and Barbuda	10.40	
11	2	Joel Báez	Dominican Republic	10.41	
12	1	Henry Vizcaíno	Cuba	10.42	
13	1	Daniel Grueso	Colombia	10.46	
14	2	Kareem Streete-Thompson	Cayman Islands	10.47	
15	1	Delwayne Delaney	Saint Kitts and Nevis	10.48	
16	2	Brian Mariano	Netherlands Antilles	10.51	

Final – July 26
Wind: +0.6 m/s

Rank	Name	Nationality	Time	Notes
1st place, gold medalist(s)	Churandy Martina	Netherlands Antilles	10.06	GR
2nd place, silver medalist(s)	Derrick Atkins	Bahamas	10.13	
3rd place, bronze medalist(s)	Jacey Harper	Trinidad and Tobago	10.33	
4	Lerone Clarke	Jamaica	10.34	
5	Juan Sainfleur	Dominican Republic	10.46	
6	Dion Crabbe	British Virgin Islands	10.48	
7	Melvin Nero	Trinidad and Tobago	10.52	
7	Jamial Rolle	Bahamas	10.52	

=== 200 meters ===
Heats – July 27
Wind:
Heat 1: -2.0 m/s, Heat 2: -2.0 m/s, Heat 3: -2.0 m/s, Heat 4: -2.0 m/s

Rank	Heat	Name	Nationality	Time	Notes
1	1	Brendan Christian	Antigua and Barbuda	21.26	Q
2	1	Chris Lloyd	Dominica	21.27	Q
3	4	Xavier Brown	Jamaica	21.33	Q
4	1	Dion Crabbe	British Virgin Islands	21.35	Q
5	4	Wilan Louis	Barbados	21.39	Q
6	4	Michael Herrera	Cuba	21.40	Q
7	1	Daniel Grueso	Colombia	21.41	q
8	3	Hawar Murillo	Colombia	21.49	Q
9	3	Carlos Santa	Dominican Republic	21.54	Q
10	3	Andrew Hinds	Barbados	21.59	Q
11	1	Delwayne Delaney	Saint Kitts and Nevis	21.61	q
12	3	Dominic Demeritte	Bahamas	21.62	q
13	4	Dennis Darling	Bahamas	21.66	q
14	2	Juan Sainfleur	Dominican Republic	21.69	Q
15	2	José Acevedo	Venezuela	21.69	Q
16	3	Nery Brenes	Costa Rica	21.94	
17	4	Rawle Greene	Guyana	22.04	
18	2	Rolando Palacios	Honduras	22.05	Q
19	1	Mario Trillo	Mexico	22.13	
20	4	Angelo Edmund	Panama	22.19	
21	4	Marcus Duncan	Trinidad and Tobago	22.28	
22	2	Robert Morton	Saint Kitts and Nevis	22.30	
23	2	Ivan Miller	Antigua and Barbuda	22.36	
24	3	Stephen Johnson	Cayman Islands	22.39	
25	2	Christian Desulme	Haiti	22.87	
	1	Jean-Homère Fevry	Haiti	DNS	
	2	Aaron Armstrong	Trinidad and Tobago	DNS	
	3	Churandy Martina	Netherlands Antilles	DNS	
	3	Keita Cline	British Virgin Islands	DNS	
	4	Aaron Oliva	Honduras	DNS	

Semifinals – July 27
Wind:
Heat 1: -0.1 m/s, Heat 2: -0.1 m/s

Rank	Heat	Name	Nationality	Time	Notes
1	1	Brendan Christian	Antigua and Barbuda	20.70	Q
2	2	Hawar Murillo	Colombia	20.79	Q
3	2	Xavier Brown	Jamaica	20.81	Q
4	1	Andrew Hinds	Barbados	20.82	Q
4	2	Dominic Demeritte	Bahamas	20.82	Q
6	2	Carlos Santa	Dominican Republic	20.92	q
7	2	Chris Lloyd	Dominica	20.97	q
8	2	Wilan Louis	Barbados	20.98	
9	1	Juan Sainfleur	Dominican Republic	21.00	Q
10	1	Dion Crabbe	British Virgin Islands	21.02	
11	1	José Acevedo	Venezuela	21.12	
12	1	Michael Herrera	Cuba	21.15	
13	1	Daniel Grueso	Colombia	21.25	
14	2	Delwayne Delaney	Saint Kitts and Nevis	21.34	
15	1	Dennis Darling	Bahamas	21.35	
16	2	Rolando Palacios	Honduras	21.36	

Final – July 28
Wind: +1.1 m/s

Rank	Name	Nationality	Time	Notes
1st place, gold medalist(s)	Xavier Brown	Jamaica	20.74	
2nd place, silver medalist(s)	Hawar Murillo	Colombia	20.78	
3rd place, bronze medalist(s)	Andrew Hinds	Barbados	20.83	
4	Brendan Christian	Antigua and Barbuda	20.86	
5	Chris Lloyd	Dominica	21.06	
6	Carlos Santa	Dominican Republic	21.14	
7	Dominic Demeritte	Bahamas	21.17	
8	Juan Sainfleur	Dominican Republic	21.21	

=== 400 meters ===
Heats – July 25

Rank	Heat	Name	Nationality	Time	Notes
1	3	Alleyne Francique	Grenada	46.18	Q
2	4	Yeimer López	Cuba	46.35	Q
3	3	Arismendy Peguero	Dominican Republic	46.40	Q
4	1	Carlos Santa	Dominican Republic	46.58	Q
5	2	Ricardo Chambers	Jamaica	46.76	Q
6	1	Williams Collazo	Cuba	46.77	Q
7	1	Michael Mathieu	Bahamas	47.00	Q
7	4	Roger Polydore	Dominica	47.00	Q
9	2	Andretti Bain	Bahamas	47.02	Q
10	1	Josner Rodríguez	Venezuela	47.06	q
11	1	Leford Green	Jamaica	47.11	q
12	4	Damion Barry	Trinidad and Tobago	47.13	Q
13	3	Renny Quow	Trinidad and Tobago	47.21	Q
14	2	Luis Luna	Venezuela	47.39	Q
15	4	Geiner Mosquera	Colombia	47.42	q
16	3	Carlos Andrés Peña	Colombia	47.47	q
17	2	Larry Inanga	Saint Kitts and Nevis	47.54	
18	4	Nery Brenes	Costa Rica	47.57	
19	3	Melville Rogers	Saint Kitts and Nevis	47.76	
20	4	Fabian Felix	Saint Lucia	48.65	
21	3	Andrés Rodríguez	Panama	49.49	
22	2	Trevor Scotland	Guyana	49.63	
23	1	N'Kosie Barnes	Antigua and Barbuda	49.64	
24	1	Charmant Ollivierre	Saint Vincent and the Grenadines	49.96	
	2	Ato Stephens	Trinidad and Tobago	DNS	

Semifinals – July 25

Rank	Heat	Name	Nationality	Time	Notes
1	1	Alleyne Francique	Grenada	45.41	Q
2	1	Arismendy Peguero	Dominican Republic	45.48	Q
3	1	Ricardo Chambers	Jamaica	45.50	Q
4	1	Michael Mathieu	Bahamas	45.90	q
5	1	Williams Collazo	Cuba	45.97	q
6	2	Yeimer López	Cuba	46.02	Q
7	1	Renny Quow	Trinidad and Tobago	46.30	
8	2	Carlos Santa	Dominican Republic	46.37	Q
9	2	Luis Luna	Venezuela	46.58	Q
10	2	Roger Polydore	Dominica	46.65	
11	2	Andretti Bain	Bahamas	46.82	
12	2	Leford Green	Jamaica	47.14	
13	1	Josner Rodríguez	Venezuela	47.22	
14	1	Carlos Andrés Peña	Colombia	47.33	
15	2	Geiner Mosquera	Colombia	48.15	
	2	Damion Barry	Trinidad and Tobago	DNS	

Final – July 26

Rank	Name	Nationality	Time	Notes
1st place, gold medalist(s)	Yeimer López	Cuba	45.28	
2nd place, silver medalist(s)	Alleyne Francique	Grenada	45.44	
3rd place, bronze medalist(s)	Arismendy Peguero	Dominican Republic	45.55	
4	Carlos Santa	Dominican Republic	45.65	
5	Ricardo Chambers	Jamaica	45.73	
6	Michael Mathieu	Bahamas	46.13	
7	Williams Collazo	Cuba	46.95	
8	Luis Luna	Venezuela	47.24	

=== 800 meters ===
Heats – July 25

Rank	Heat	Name	Nationality	Time	Notes
1	2	Eduar Villanueva	Venezuela	1:48.34	Q
2	2	Moise Joseph	Haiti	1:48.53	Q
3	2	Jamaal James	Trinidad and Tobago	1:48.62	q
4	1	Sherridan Kirk	Trinidad and Tobago	1:49.57	Q
5	1	Maury Surel Castillo	Cuba	1:49.60	Q
6	1	Martell Munguía	Mexico	1:49.76	q
7	1	Jhon Chávez	Colombia	1:50.26	
7	2	Evan Allen	Jamaica	1:50.26	
9	3	Andy González	Cuba	1:51.35	Q
10	3	Simoncito Silvera	Venezuela	1:51.65	Q
11	2	Juan Odalis Almonte	Dominican Republic	1:52.15	
12	1	Andre Drummond	Jamaica	1:52.65	
13	3	Frank Bobadilla	Dominican Republic	1:52.66	
14	3	Nigel Leonce	Saint Lucia	1:52.68	
15	3	Jenner Pelicó	Guatemala	1:55.46	
16	2	Trevor Scotland	Guyana	1:55.90	
17	3	Adolphus Jones	Saint Kitts and Nevis	1:59.59	
	3	Michael Donawa	Bermuda	DNF	

Final – July 27

Rank	Name	Nationality	Time	Notes
1st place, gold medalist(s)	Andy González	Cuba	1:46.26	CACJR
2nd place, silver medalist(s)	Sherridan Kirk	Trinidad and Tobago	1:46.55	
3rd place, bronze medalist(s)	Maury Surel Castillo	Cuba	1:47.60	
4	Moise Joseph	Haiti	1:47.93	
5	Eduar Villanueva	Venezuela	1:48.21	
6	Jamaal James	Trinidad and Tobago	1:48.98	
7	Martell Munguía	Mexico	1:50.57	
8	Simoncito Silvera	Venezuela	1:52.46	

=== 1500 meters ===
July 25

Rank	Name	Nationality	Time	Notes
1st place, gold medalist(s)	Juan Luis Barrios	Mexico	3:42.52	
2nd place, silver medalist(s)	David Freeman	Puerto Rico	3:43.84	
3rd place, bronze medalist(s)	Maury Surel Castillo	Cuba	3:43.93	
4	Eduar Villanueva	Venezuela	3:44.27	
5	Nico Herrera	Venezuela	3:46.56	
6	Luis Daniel Soto	Puerto Rico	3:48.13	
7	Jhon Chávez	Colombia	3:49.29	
8	Andy González	Cuba	3:49.78	
9	Miguel Ángel Orduña	Mexico	3:50.24	
10	Juan Odalis Almonte	Dominican Republic	3:51.31	
11	Kerone Fairweather	Jamaica	4:01.14	
12	Alex Morgan	Jamaica	4:01.75	

=== 5000 meters ===
July 29

Rank	Name	Nationality	Time	Notes
1st place, gold medalist(s)	Juan Luis Barrios	Mexico	14:09.08	
2nd place, silver medalist(s)	Alejandro Suárez	Mexico	14:10.58	
3rd place, bronze medalist(s)	Norbert Gutiérrez	Cuba	14:13.50	
4	Freddy González	Venezuela	14:19.02	
5	Javier Guarín	Colombia	14:24.00	
6	José Amado García	Guatemala	14:27.54	
7	Yausbel Arbolaez	Cuba	14:28.76	
8	Luis Fonseca	Venezuela	14:37.02	
9	Víctor Hernández	Guatemala	15:13.37	
10	Denzel Ramirez	Trinidad and Tobago	15:18.72	
11	Jesús Ramírez	Dominican Republic	15:25.23	
	César Lam	Puerto Rico	DNS	
	Johnny Loria	Costa Rica	DNS	
	Francisco Gómez Vega	Costa Rica	DNS	

=== 10,000 meters ===
July 26

Rank	Name	Nationality	Time	Notes
1st place, gold medalist(s)	David Galván	Mexico	29:40.08	
2nd place, silver medalist(s)	Javier Guarín	Colombia	29:41.51	
3rd place, bronze medalist(s)	Norbert Gutiérrez	Cuba	29:50.53	
4	José Amado García	Guatemala	30:09.31	
5	Yausbel Arbolaez	Cuba	30:19.91	
6	Luis Fonseca	Venezuela	30:30.28	
7	Juan Carlos Romero	Mexico	30:44.23	
8	César Lam	Puerto Rico	31:38.81	
9	Johnny Loria	Costa Rica	32:12.53	
10	Jason Saunders	Jamaica	33:47.94	
11	Wainard Talbert	Jamaica	34:55.65	
	Víctor Hernández	Guatemala	DNF	
	Francisco Gómez Vega	Costa Rica	DNS	

=== Marathon ===
July 29

Rank	Name	Nationality	Time	Notes
1st place, gold medalist(s)	Procopio Franco	Mexico	2:24:35	
2nd place, silver medalist(s)	Juan Carlos Cardona	Colombia	2:27:43	
3rd place, bronze medalist(s)	Alfredo Arévalo	Guatemala	2:28:27	
4	Diego Colorado	Colombia	2:30:19	
5	Aguelmis Rojas	Cuba	2:34:00	
6	Luis Rivera	Puerto Rico	2:36:51	
7	Rubén Maza	Venezuela	2:38:10	
8	Carlos Tarazona	Venezuela	2:39:48	
9	Henry Jaen	Cuba	2:39:48	
10	Pamenos Ballantyne	Saint Vincent and the Grenadines	2:44:50	
11	Andrew Gutzmore	Jamaica	2:58:15	
12	Lindson Lynch	Dominica	3:18:24	NR
13	Billy Boehlke	United States Virgin Islands	3:32:25	
	Luis Collazo	Puerto Rico	DNF	

=== 110 meters hurdles ===
Heats – July 25
Wind:
Heat 1: +0.2 m/s, Heat 2: +2.1 m/s

Rank	Heat	Name	Nationality	Time	Notes
1	2	Dayron Robles	Cuba	13.32	Q
2	2	Paulo Villar	Colombia	13.45	Q
3	1	Yoel Hernández	Cuba	13.60	Q
4	1	Stephen Jones	Barbados	13.61	Q
5	2	Dudley Dorival	Haiti	13.78	Q
6	1	Carlos Jorge	Dominican Republic	13.99	Q
7	1	Sanchez Ross	Trinidad and Tobago	14.24	q
8	1	Sadros Sánchez	Panama	14.29	q
9	2	Ronald Bennett	Honduras	14.31	
10	2	Ronald Forbes	Cayman Islands	14.42	
11	2	Jorge Ricardo González	Honduras	14.98	

Final – July 26
Wind:
+0.7 m/s

Rank	Name	Nationality	Time	Notes
1st place, gold medalist(s)	Dayron Robles	Cuba	13.12	GR
2nd place, silver medalist(s)	Paulo Villar	Colombia	13.29	=AR
3rd place, bronze medalist(s)	Yoel Hernández	Cuba	13.29	
4	Stephen Jones	Barbados	13.67	
5	Dudley Dorival	Haiti	13.68	
6	Carlos Jorge	Dominican Republic	14.03	
7	Sanchez Ross	Trinidad and Tobago	14.39	
8	Sadros Sánchez	Panama	14.50	

=== 400 meters hurdles ===
Heats – July 26

Rank	Heat	Name	Nationality	Time	Notes
1	1	Bayano Kamani	Panama	50.27	Q
2	1	Félix Sánchez	Dominican Republic	50.43	Q
3	1	Bryan Steele	Jamaica	50.56	Q
4	1	Jonathan Williams	Belize	50.70	q, NR
5	2	Ian Weakley	Jamaica	50.95	Q
6	2	Javier Culson	Puerto Rico	51.31	Q
7	2	Jonathan Gibson	Panama	51.96	Q
8	1	Amílcar Torres	Colombia	52.26	q
9	1	Douglas Lynes-Bell	Bahamas	52.46	
10	1	Jonnie Lowe	Honduras	52.96	
11	2	Yacnier Luis	Cuba	55.92	
12	2	Luis Constanzo	Dominican Republic	58.46	

Final – July 27

Rank	Name	Nationality	Time	Notes
1st place, gold medalist(s)	Bayano Kamani	Panama	49.44	
2nd place, silver medalist(s)	Ian Weakley	Jamaica	49.74	
3rd place, bronze medalist(s)	Bryan Steele	Jamaica	50.12	
4	Félix Sánchez	Dominican Republic	50.45	
5	Javier Culson	Puerto Rico	50.56	
6	Jonathan Williams	Belize	50.92	
7	Jonathan Gibson	Panama	52.14	
8	Amílcar Torres	Colombia	52.70	

=== 3000 meters steeplechase ===
July 28

Rank	Name	Nationality	Time	Notes
1st place, gold medalist(s)	Alexander Greaux	Puerto Rico	8:44.51	
2nd place, silver medalist(s)	Néstor Nieves	Venezuela	8:44.86	
3rd place, bronze medalist(s)	José Alberto Sánchez	Cuba	8:46.05	
4	José Salvador Miranda	Mexico	8:53.31	
5	Josafath González	Mexico	8:54.53	
6	Emigdio Delgado	Venezuela	9:09.11	
7	Yoandry Caraballo	Cuba	9:15.81	
8	Jhon Jairo Vargas	Colombia	9:19.37	

=== 4 × 100 meters relay ===
Heats – July 28

Rank	Heat	Nation	Athletes	Time	Notes
1	2	Jamaica	Lerone Clarke, Leford Green, Carl Barrett, Xavier Brown	39.35	Q
2	2	Netherlands Antilles	Brian Mariano, Prince Kwidama, Jairo Duzant, Churandy Martina	39.47	Q
3	2	Bahamas	Adrian Griffith, Derrick Atkins, Rodney Green, Dominic Demeritte	39.49	Q
4	1	Dominican Republic	Juan Sainfleur, Joel Báez, Carlos García, Irving Guerrero	39.82	Q
5	1	Trinidad and Tobago	Melvin Nero, Kevon Pierre, Jamil James, Jacey Harper	39.85	Q
6	1	Colombia	Néstor Miller, Daniel Grueso, Hawar Murillo, Harlin Echavarría	40.17	Q
6	2	Cuba	Luis Reyes, Yoel Hernández, Dayron Robles, Michael Herrera	40.17	q
8	2	Saint Kitts and Nevis	Tristan Hensley, Delwayne Delaney, Larry Inanga, Robert Morton	40.63	q
9	1	Honduras	Darwin Colón, Ronald Bennett, Jonnie Lowe, Rolando Palacios	41.47	NR
	1	Antigua and Barbuda	N'Kosie Barnes, Daniel Bailey, Ivan Miller, Brendan Christian	DNF	
	1	Haiti		DNS	

Final – July 29

Rank	Team	Name	Time	Notes
1st place, gold medalist(s)	Netherlands Antilles	Brian Mariano, Prince Kwidama, Jairo Duzant, Churandy Martina	39.29	
2nd place, silver medalist(s)	Bahamas	Adrian Griffith, Derrick Atkins, Rodney Green, Dominic Demeritte	39.44	
3rd place, bronze medalist(s)	Jamaica	Lerone Clarke, Xavier Brown, Herbert McGregor, Carl Barrett	39.45	
4	Cuba	Luis Reyes, Yoel Hernández, Dayron Robles, Michael Herrera	39.63	
5	Dominican Republic	Juan Sainfleur, Joel Báez, Carlos García, Irving Guerrero	39.83	
6	Trinidad and Tobago	Melvin Nero, Kevon Pierre, Jamil James, Jacey Harper	39.92	
7	Colombia	Néstor Miller, Daniel Grueso, Hawar Murillo, John Córdoba	40.30	
8	Saint Kitts and Nevis	Tristan Hensley, Delwayne Delaney, Larry Inanga, Robert Morton	41.00	

=== 4 × 400 meters relay ===
Heats – July 28

Rank	Heat	Nation	Athletes	Time	Notes
1	2	Jamaica	Sanjay Ayre, Leford Green, Ricardo Chambers, Bryan Steele	3:04.59	Q
2	1	Dominican Republic	Félix Sánchez, Arismendi Peguero, Pedro Mejía, Yoel Tapia	3:05.99	Q
3	1	Venezuela	Danny Núñez, Josner Rodríguez, José Acevedo, Luis Luna	3:06.48	Q
4	1	Bahamas	Andretti Bain, Jamal Moss, Douglas Lynes-Bell, Michael Mathieu	3:06.51	Q
5	2	Saint Kitts and Nevis	Larry Inanga, Delwayne Delaney, Kadeem Smith, Melville Rogers	3:08.36	Q
6	2	Cuba	Williams Collazo, Yacnier Luis, Carlos Patterson, Yeimer López	3:08.71	Q
7	1	Colombia	Geiner Mosquera, Javier Mosquera, Jhon Franklin López, Carlos Andrés Peña	3:10.53	q
8	2	Trinidad and Tobago	Renny Quow, Kevon Pierre, Jamil James, Damion Barry	3:12.25	q
9	1	Panama	Angelo Edmund, Andrés Rodríguez, Jonathan Gibson, Sadros Sánchez	3:17.05	
	2	Grenada		DNS	

Final – July 29

Rank	Team	Name	Time	Notes
1st place, gold medalist(s)	Jamaica	Sanjay Ayre, Leford Green, Ricardo Chambers, Bryan Steele	3:01.78	GR
2nd place, silver medalist(s)	Trinidad and Tobago	Renny Quow, Kevon Pierre, Jamil James, Damion Barry	3:02.65	
3rd place, bronze medalist(s)	Dominican Republic	Félix Sánchez, Arismendi Peguero, Carlos Santa, Yoel Tapia	3:03.25	
4	Bahamas	Andretti Bain, Jamal Moss, Douglas Lynes-Bell, Michael Mathieu	3:05.73	
5	Venezuela	Danny Núñez, Josner Rodríguez, José Acevedo, Luis Luna	3:05.82	
6	Saint Kitts and Nevis	Larry Inanga, Delwayne Delaney, Kadeem Smith, Melville Rogers	3:07.32	NR
7	Colombia	Geiner Mosquera, Javier Mosquera, Jhon Franklin López, Carlos Andrés Peña	3:09.47	
	Cuba	Williams Collazo, Yacnier Luis, Carlos Patterson, Yeimer López	DQ	

=== 20 kilometers walk ===
July 25

Rank	Name	Nationality	Time	Notes
1st place, gold medalist(s)	Luis Fernando López	Colombia	1:24:11	
2nd place, silver medalist(s)	Éder Sánchez	Mexico	1:26:23	
3rd place, bronze medalist(s)	Luis Fernando García	Guatemala	1:29:45	
4	Gabriel Ortiz	Mexico	1:32:00	
5	Julio René Martínez	Guatemala	1:33:00	
6	Walter Sandoval	El Salvador	1:39:10	
7	Allan Segura	Costa Rica	1:47:00	
	Gustavo Restrepo	Colombia	DQ	
	Salvador Mira	El Salvador	DQ	

=== High jump ===
July 26

Rank	Athlete	Nationality	1.95	2.00	2.05	2.10	2.13	2.16	2.19	2.25	Result	Notes
1st place, gold medalist(s)	Gilmar Mayo	Colombia	–	–	–	xo	xo	o	xo	xxx	2.19	
2nd place, silver medalist(s)	Trevor Barry	Bahamas	–	–	o	xo	o	o	xxx		2.16	
3rd place, bronze medalist(s)	Gerardo Martínez	Mexico	–	–	o	o	–	xo	xxx		2.16	
4	James Grayman	Antigua and Barbuda	o	o	xo	xo	o	xxx			2.13	
4	Julio Luciano	Dominican Republic	–	–	o	xxo	o	xxx			2.13	
4	Donald Thomas	Bahamas	–	–	xxo	o	o	xxx			2.13	
7	Daniel Rodríguez	Venezuela	–	–	o	o	xxo	xxx			2.13	
8	Yunier Carrillo	Cuba	–	–	–	xxo	–	xxx			2.10	
9	Brandon Williams	Dominica	o	o	xo	xxx					2.05	=NJR
10	Damon Thompson	Barbados	–	–	xxo	xxx					2.05	
11	Jorge Rouco	Mexico	–	xo	xxx						2.00	
12	Adolphus Jones	Saint Kitts and Nevis	o	xxx							1.95	
	Albert Bravo	Venezuela	–	–	–	xxx					NM	
	Henderson Dottin	Barbados	–	x							NM	

=== Pole vault ===
July 29

Rank	Athlete	Nationality	4.60	4.75	4.90	5.00	5.20	5.35	5.40	5.50	5.60	Result	Notes
1st place, gold medalist(s)	Robison Pratt	Mexico	–	–	–	–	o	o	–	o	xxx	5.50	GR
2nd place, silver medalist(s)	Dominic Johnson	Saint Lucia	–	–	–	xo	o	x–	xx			5.20	
3rd place, bronze medalist(s)	David Rojas	Colombia	xxo	xxx								4.60	
	Giovanni Lanaro	Mexico	–	–	–	–	xxx					NM	
	Lázaro Borges	Cuba	–	–	xxx							NM	
	Natanael Semeis	Dominican Republic	xxx									NM	

=== Long jump ===
Qualification – July 26

Rank	Athlete	Nationality	#1	#2	#3	Result	Notes
1	Irving Saladino	Panama	7.97			7.97	Q
2	Ibrahim Camejo	Cuba	7.32	7.63	7.84	7.84	Q
3	Keita Cline	British Virgin Islands	x	6.92	7.78	7.78	q
4	Trevor Barry	Bahamas	7.78	–	–	7.78	q
5	Herbert McGregor	Jamaica	7.37	7.38	7.72	7.72	q
6	Iván Pedroso	Cuba	x	7.64	–	7.64	q
7	Osbourne Moxey	Bahamas	7.60	7.59	–	7.60	q
8	LeJuan Simon	Trinidad and Tobago	6.82	7.53	–	7.53	q
9	Esteban Copland	Venezuela	7.41	7.44	7.47	7.47	q
10	Carlos Jorge	Dominican Republic	7.45	7.41	x	7.45	q
11	Wilbert Walker	Jamaica	7.24	7.40	x	7.40	q
12	Maxwell Álvarez	Guatemala	6.89	x	7.24	7.24	q
13	Marco Antonio Ibargüen	Colombia	7.23	x	x	7.23	
14	Chris Hercules	Trinidad and Tobago	x	7.14	7.21	7.21	
15	Ralston Henry	British Virgin Islands	x	6.26	x	6.26	
16	Joel Wade	Belize	5.96	x	6.03	6.03	

Final – July 28

Rank	Athlete	Nationality	#1	#2	#3	#4	#5	#6	Result	Notes
1st place, gold medalist(s)	Irving Saladino	Panama	8.06	x	x	8.29	–	8.25	8.29	
2nd place, silver medalist(s)	Iván Pedroso	Cuba	8.06	x	7.61	7.74	x	7.92	7.92	
3rd place, bronze medalist(s)	Ibrahim Camejo	Cuba	7.44	7.64	7.63	7.77	7.58	7.83	7.83	
4	Herbert McGregor	Jamaica	7.16	7.69	7.37	7.19	7.78	7.56	7.78	
5	Osbourne Moxey	Bahamas	7.68	7.73	x	x	x	x	7.73	
6	Trevor Barry	Bahamas	x	7.40	7.35	7.39	x	7.59	7.59	
7	LeJuan Simon	Trinidad and Tobago	5.47	7.34	x	x	5.30	x	7.34	
8	Carlos Jorge	Dominican Republic	7.31	x	7.14	7.26	7.33	x	7.33	
9	Esteban Copland	Venezuela	7.00	7.31	x				7.31	
10	Keita Cline	British Virgin Islands	x	6.86	7.08				7.08	
11	Maxwell Álvarez	Guatemala	6.83	6.48	6.86				6.86	
	Wilbert Walker	Jamaica							DNS	

=== Triple jump ===
July 27

Rank	Athlete	Nationality	#1	#2	#3	#4	#5	#6	Result	Notes
1st place, gold medalist(s)	Yoandri Betanzos	Cuba	x	17.46	x	x	–	–	17.46	
2nd place, silver medalist(s)	Alexis Copello	Cuba	16.85	x	–	x	–	–	16.85	
3rd place, bronze medalist(s)	Wilbert Walker	Jamaica	16.35	16.16	x	15.97	15.71	16.06	16.35	
4	LeJuan Simon	Trinidad and Tobago	x	x	15.93	x	16.33	16.33	16.33	
5	Kenneth Sylvester	Jamaica	15.65	15.70	15.97	15.29	15.89	15.55	15.97	
6	Johnny Rodríguez	Venezuela	15.61	15.56	15.70	15.53	15.89	x	15.89	
7	Chris Hercules	Trinidad and Tobago	15.59	15.30	–	15.33	15.79	15.70	15.59	
8	Carlos Carabalí	Colombia	x	15.37	15.56	15.31	x	15.01	15.56	
9	Ayata Joseph	Antigua and Barbuda	15.25	14.87	–				15.25	
10	Maxwell Álvarez	Guatemala	15.16	x	14.48				15.16	
11	Kessel Campbell	Honduras	14.81	14.68	14.66w				14.81	
12	Juan Carlos Nájera	Guatemala	x	x	14.44				14.44	
	Fabian Florant	Dominica							DNS	
	Randy Lewis	Grenada							DNS	
	Allen Simms	Puerto Rico							DNS	

=== Shot put ===
July 29

Rank	Athlete	Nationality	#1	#2	#3	#4	#5	#6	Result	Notes
DQ	Dorian Scott	Jamaica	~~20.34~~	~~20.08~~	~~20.05~~	~~x~~	~~x~~	~~x~~	~~20.34~~	^{1}
1st place, gold medalist(s)	Alexis Paumier	Cuba	17.45	x	17.89	x	18.26	x	18.26	
2nd place, silver medalist(s)	Reynaldo Proenza	Cuba	17.97	18.00	18.03	x	x	x	18.03	
3rd place, bronze medalist(s)	Yojer Medina	Venezuela	17.17	17.47	17.35	x	17.90	17.94	17.94	
4	Jiovanny García	Colombia	17.01	17.40	17.15	16.79	17.53	17.63	17.63	
5	Manuel Repollet	Puerto Rico	16.81	17.28	x	x	17.04	x	17.28	
6	Jhonny Rodríguez	Colombia	17.06	x	16.73	16.43	x	x	17.06	
7	Paulino Ríos	Mexico	16.05	16.53	16.34	x	x	16.23	16.53	
8	Jason Morgan	Jamaica	16.47	x	x				16.47	
9	Tyron Benjamin	Dominica	14.05	14.68	14.23				14.68	NJR
10	Expedi Peña	Dominican Republic	14.38	14.64	14.59				14.64	

^{1} Dorian Scott originally won the gold medal with 20.34 metres but was later disqualified after he tested positive for cannabis.

=== Discus throw ===
July 27

Rank	Athlete	Nationality	#1	#2	#3	#4	#5	#6	Result	Notes
1st place, gold medalist(s)	Yunior Lastre	Cuba	55.33	x	55.88	56.52	57.00	56.40	57.00	
2nd place, silver medalist(s)	Jason Morgan	Jamaica	52.64	54.87	56.22	x	x	56.56	56.56	
3rd place, bronze medalist(s)	Héctor Hurtado	Venezuela	49.15	51.90	52.16	52.60	51.83	51.31	52.60	
4	Alfredo Romero	Puerto Rico	52.47	48.01	48.05	50.67	51.85	49.82	52.47	
5	Adonson Shallow	Saint Vincent and the Grenadines	x	51.51	x	x	52.33	x	52.33	NR
6	Expedi Peña	Dominican Republic	47.57	51.33	50.78	51.64	50.61	x	51.64	
7	Jesús Sánchez	Mexico	47.66	x	44.02	49.77	50.33	x	50.33	
8	Eric Mathias	British Virgin Islands	47.87	46.28	47.20	x	47.59	47.49	47.87	
9	Michael Letterlough	Cayman Islands	43.79	44.76	x				44.76	
	Alexis Paumier	Cuba	x	x	x				NM	
	Julián Angulo	Colombia							DNS	

=== Hammer throw ===
July 28

Rank	Athlete	Nationality	#1	#2	#3	#4	#5	#6	Result	Notes
1st place, gold medalist(s)	Noleysi Bicet	Cuba	x	66.33	69.56	x	x	x	69.56	
2nd place, silver medalist(s)	Yosvany Suárez	Cuba	67.62	x	x	x	66.91	x	67.62	
3rd place, bronze medalist(s)	Aldo Bello	Venezuela	60.47	61.74	x	61.97	62.55	62.05	62.55	
4	Raúl Rivera	Guatemala	61.53	62.43	61.89	58.80	61.24	60.28	62.43	
5	Jacobo D'León	Colombia	57.11	58.84	x	x	56.39	62.00	62.00	
6	Luis Martín	Mexico	60.28	x	61.75	61.57	x	x	61.75	
7	Santos Vega	Puerto Rico	58.99	60.77	x	x	x	59.83	60.77	
8	Santiago De Jesús Loera	Mexico	57.37	59.24	56.27	59.06	58.22	59.58	59.58	
9	Michael Letterlough	Cayman Islands	52.65	53.08	50.52				53.08	
9	Santiago Helena	Dominican Republic	x	x	x				NM	

=== Javelin throw ===
July 25

Rank	Athlete	Nationality	#1	#2	#3	#4	#5	#6	Result	Notes
1st place, gold medalist(s)	Guillermo Martínez	Cuba	80.28	82.16	82.39	–	84.91	–	84.91	GR
2nd place, silver medalist(s)	Yudel Moreno	Cuba	74.22	78.44	76.63	x	74.08	x	78.44	
3rd place, bronze medalist(s)	Noraldo Palacios	Colombia	x	71.36	71.55	67.30	74.10	70.37	74.10	
4	Rigoberto Calderón	Nicaragua	65.91	x	62.72	x	x	x	65.91	
5	Darwin García	Dominican Republic	x	63.53	64.06	60.63	x	65.14	65.14	
6	Justin Cummins	Barbados	58.38	63.48	60.54	64.45	x	64.10	64.45	
7	Mekel Downer	Jamaica	53.52	62.22	46.95	50.57	51.57	35.58	62.22	NJR
8	Luis Guzmán	Mexico	58.79	61.24	60.34	x	58.46	x	61.24	
9	Aundrae Clarke	Jamaica	59.70	58.01	60.51				60.51	

=== Decathlon ===
July 25–26

The highest mark recorded in each event is highlighted in yellow

Rank	Athlete	Nationality	100m	LJ	SP	HJ	400m	110m H	DT	PV	JT	1500m	Points	Notes
1st place, gold medalist(s)	Alexis Chivás	Cuba	10.97	7.31	14.99	1.81	53.16	15.10	46.60	4.20	59.04	4:42.76	7551	
2nd place, silver medalist(s)	Carlos Patterson	Cuba	10.85	7.17	12.83	1.81	49.36	13.92	37.32	4.10	48.94	5:09.68	7203	
3rd place, bronze medalist(s)	Andrés Mantilla	Colombia	11.30	6.47	13.14	1.99	51.62	15.32	41.84	4.20	49.69	4:38.45	7157	
4	Juan Carlos Jaramillo	Venezuela	11.53	7.01	12.21	1.99	51.49	15.10	36.18	3.80	58.67	4:37.12	7125	
5	Leandro López	Dominican Republic	11.25	6.46	11.66	1.72	51.13	16.33	30.29	3.90	49.94	4:55.38	6334	
6	Darwin Colón	Honduras	11.11	6.35	12.44	1.78	51.21	14.88	35.60	3.00	42.75	5:22.25	6220	NR
	Steven Marrero	Puerto Rico	11.55	6.26	13.02	NM	DNS	–	–	–	–	–	DNF	

== Women's results ==
=== 100 meters ===
Heats – July 25
Wind:
Heat 1: +3.2 m/s, Heat 2: +1.6 m/s, Heat 3: +2.3 m/s

Rank	Heat	Name	Nationality	Time	Notes
1	1	Tahesia Harrigan	British Virgin Islands	11.19	Q
2	2	LaVerne Jones-Ferrette	United States Virgin Islands	11.30	Q
3	2	Virgil Hodge	Saint Kitts and Nevis	11.34	Q
4	3	Virgen Benavides	Cuba	11.43	Q
5	1	Ayanna Hutchinson	Trinidad and Tobago	11.50	Q
6	1	Nyoka Cole	Jamaica	11.52	q
7	2	Marleny Mejía	Dominican Republic	11.54	q, NR
8	1	Tamicka Clarke	Bahamas	11.55	
9	3	Yomara Hinestroza	Colombia	11.59	Q
10	2	Jade Bailey	Barbados	11.61	
11	3	Tanika Liburd	Saint Kitts and Nevis	11.63	
12	3	Rosemarie Whyte	Jamaica	11.65	
13	2	Misleidys Lazo	Cuba	11.71	
14	3	Savatheda Fynes	Bahamas	11.75	
15	2	Semoy Hackett	Trinidad and Tobago	11.76	
16	1	Valma Bass	United States Virgin Islands	11.77	
17	3	Roxana Mercado	Puerto Rico	11.79	
18	1	Tricia Flores	Belize	12.28	
19	3	Karene King	British Virgin Islands	12.32	
20	1	Mirtha Martínez	Honduras	12.55	
21	3	Samanta Fernández	Honduras	12.94	
	2	Cydonie Mothersill	Cayman Islands	DNS	

Final – July 26
Wind:
+0.5 m/s

Rank	Name	Nationality	Time	Notes
1st place, gold medalist(s)	Tahesia Harrigan	British Virgin Islands	11.15	
2nd place, silver medalist(s)	LaVerne Jones-Ferrette	United States Virgin Islands	11.50	
3rd place, bronze medalist(s)	Virgil Hodge	Saint Kitts and Nevis	11.52	
4	Ayanna Hutchinson	Trinidad and Tobago	11.55	
5	Virgen Benavides	Cuba	11.61	
6	Yomara Hinestroza	Colombia	11.75	
7	Nyoka Cole	Jamaica	11.77	
8	Marleny Mejía	Dominican Republic	11.79	

=== 200 meters ===
Heats – July 27
Wind:
Heat 1: -1.0 m/s, Heat 2: -1.0 m/s, Heat 3: -1.0 m/s

Rank	Heat	Name	Nationality	Time	Notes
1	2	Roxana Díaz	Cuba	23.21	Q
2	2	Felipa Palacios	Colombia	23.52	Q
3	3	LaVerne Jones-Ferrette	United States Virgin Islands	23.57	Q
4	1	Virgil Hodge	Saint Kitts and Nevis	23.62	Q
5	1	Jade Bailey	Barbados	23.77	Q
6	3	Darlenys Obregón	Colombia	23.82	Q
7	2	Militza Castro	Puerto Rico	23.85	q
8	2	Valma Bass	United States Virgin Islands	24.16	q
9	2	Jenice Daley	Jamaica	24.25	
10	1	Ruth Grajeda	Mexico	24.27	
11	3	Marleny Mejía	Dominican Republic	24.31	
12	1	Marcia Woolery	Jamaica	24.42	
12	2	Ayanna Hutchinson	Trinidad and Tobago	24.42	
14	3	Semoy Hackett	Trinidad and Tobago	24.96	
15	3	Akilah King	Bermuda	25.16	
16	1	Jackel King	British Virgin Islands	26.00	
	3	Tahesia Harrigan	British Virgin Islands	DNS	

Final – July 27
Wind:
-0.4 m/s

Rank	Name	Nationality	Time	Notes
1st place, gold medalist(s)	Roxana Díaz	Cuba	22.76	GR
2nd place, silver medalist(s)	Virgil Hodge	Saint Kitts and Nevis	23.09	
3rd place, bronze medalist(s)	Jade Bailey	Barbados	23.32	
4	LaVerne Jones-Ferrette	United States Virgin Islands	23.33	
5	Militza Castro	Puerto Rico	23.67	
6	Felipa Palacios	Colombia	23.68	
7	Darlenys Obregón	Colombia	23.80	
8	Valma Bass	United States Virgin Islands	24.12	

=== 400 meters ===
Heats – July 25

Rank	Heat	Name	Nationality	Time	Notes
1	1	Hazel-Ann Regis	Grenada	52.64	Q
2	3	Ana Guevara	Mexico	52.92	Q
3	1	Kineke Alexander	Saint Vincent and the Grenadines	52.98	Q
4	2	Clora Williams	Jamaica	53.12	Q
5	2	Ginou Etienne	Haiti	53.46	Q
6	1	Aliann Pompey	Guyana	53.49	q
7	1	Mayra González	Mexico	53.75	q
8	2	Ana Hachy Peña	Cuba	53.78	
9	2	Nathandra John	Saint Kitts and Nevis	53.84	
10	3	Norma González	Colombia	54.51	Q
11	3	Nickeisha Charles	Trinidad and Tobago	55.03	
12	3	Lorena de la Rosa	Dominican Republic	55.41	
13	1	Maria Alejandra Idrobo	Colombia	55.93	
14	2	Romona Modeste	Trinidad and Tobago	55.70	
15	3	Merica Moncherry	Saint Lucia	56.00	
16	3	Tyfia Lee	United States Virgin Islands	57.18	
17	2	Libia Patricia Rodríguez	Dominican Republic	57.31	

Final – July 25

Rank	Name	Nationality	Time	Notes
1st place, gold medalist(s)	Ana Guevara	Mexico	50.99	
2nd place, silver medalist(s)	Hazel-Ann Regis	Grenada	51.16	
3rd place, bronze medalist(s)	Kineke Alexander	Saint Vincent and the Grenadines	52.04	
4	Norma González	Colombia	52.37	
5	Clora Williams	Jamaica	53.00	
6	Ginou Etienne	Haiti	53.28	
7	Mayra González	Mexico	53.48	
8	Aliann Pompey	Guyana	54.11	

=== 800 meters ===
July 29

Rank	Name	Nationality	Time	Notes
1st place, gold medalist(s)	Zulia Calatayud	Cuba	2:05.26	
2nd place, silver medalist(s)	Rosibel García	Colombia	2:05.78	
3rd place, bronze medalist(s)	Gabriela Medina	Mexico	2:06.15	
4	Marian Burnett	Guyana	2:06.20	
5	Yuneisy Santiusty	Cuba	2:07.69	
6	Muriel Coneo	Colombia	2:08.27	
7	Althea Chambers	Jamaica	2:08.90	
8	Lizaira Del Valle	Puerto Rico	2:08.95	
9	Sonny García	Dominican Republic	2:12.26	
10	Nichelle Gibbs	United States Virgin Islands	2:17.32	
	Neisha Bernard-Thomas	Grenada	DNS	
	Sheena Gooding	Barbados	DNS	

=== 1500 meters ===
July 25

Rank	Name	Nationality	Time	Notes
1st place, gold medalist(s)	Rosibel García	Colombia	4:18.29	GR, NR
2nd place, silver medalist(s)	Yuneisy Santiusty	Cuba	4:19.32	
3rd place, bronze medalist(s)	Lizaira Del Valle	Puerto Rico	4:21.84	
4	Ana Joaquina Rondón	Colombia	4:23.53	
5	Dulce María Rodríguez	Mexico	4:24.65	
6	Yeisy Álvarez	Venezuela	4:32.93	
7	Sonny García	Dominican Republic	4:38.33	
8	Angélica Sánchez	Mexico	4:40.16	
9	Liliani Méndez	Puerto Rico	4:41.99	

=== 5000 meters ===
July 29

Rank	Name	Nationality	Time	Notes
1st place, gold medalist(s)	Bertha Sánchez	Colombia	16:17.13	GR
2nd place, silver medalist(s)	Dulce María Rodríguez	Mexico	16:18.15	
3rd place, bronze medalist(s)	Madaí Pérez	Mexico	16:19.38	
4	Yudileyvis Castillo	Cuba	16:40.08	
5	Stella Castro	Colombia	17:21.64	
6	Yeisy Álvarez	Venezuela	17:26.00	
7	Yaremis Torres	Cuba	17:37.09	

=== Marathon ===
July 29

Rank	Name	Nationality	Time	Notes
1st place, gold medalist(s)	María Elena Valencia	Mexico	2:45:49	
2nd place, silver medalist(s)	Yailén García	Cuba	2:51:43	
3rd place, bronze medalist(s)	Iglandini González	Colombia	2:54:05	
4	Paula Apolonio	Mexico	2:56:39	
5	Yolanda Mercado	Puerto Rico	3:12:17	
6	Élida Hernández	Guatemala	3:16:48	
	Milagros Lugo	Venezuela	DNF	
	Arieta Martin	Jamaica	DNF	
	Mariela González	Cuba	DNF	

=== 100 meters hurdles ===
Heats – July 25
Wind:
Heat 1: +2.1 m/s, Heat 2: +2.1 m/s

Rank	Heat	Name	Nationality	Time	Notes
1	1	Anay Tejeda	Cuba	12.76	Q
2	2	Nadine Faustin-Parker	Haiti	12.86	Q
3	1	Toni-Ann D'Oyley	Jamaica	13.06	Q
4	2	Andrea Bliss	Jamaica	13.21	Q
5	1	Tiavannia Thompson	Bahamas	13.67	Q
6	1	Princesa Oliveros	Colombia	13.78	q
7	2	Brigitte Merlano	Colombia	13.89	Q
8	2	Zolymar Febles	Puerto Rico	13.94	q
9	1	Jeimy Bernárdez	Honduras	14.04	
10	1	Yenima Arencibia	Cuba	14.25	
11	1	Jéssica Lino	Honduras	16.12	

Final – July 26
Wind:
+0.4 m/s

Rank	Name	Nationality	Time	Notes
1st place, gold medalist(s)	Anay Tejeda	Cuba	12.86	
2nd place, silver medalist(s)	Nadine Faustin-Parker	Haiti	12.91	
3rd place, bronze medalist(s)	Toni-Ann D'Oyley	Jamaica	13.10	
4	Andrea Bliss	Jamaica	13.42	
5	Princesa Oliveros	Colombia	13.84	
6	Tiavannia Thompson	Bahamas	13.85	
7	Brigitte Merlano	Colombia	13.86	
8	Zolymar Febles	Puerto Rico	14.16	

=== 400 meters hurdles ===
July 27

Rank	Name	Nationality	Time	Notes
1st place, gold medalist(s)	Daimí Pernía	Cuba	55.32	
2nd place, silver medalist(s)	Josanne Lucas	Trinidad and Tobago	55.60	
3rd place, bronze medalist(s)	Melaine Walker	Jamaica	55.97	
4	Shevon Stoddart	Jamaica	57.13	
5	Princesa Oliveros	Colombia	58.07	
6	Yolanda Osana	Dominican Republic	1:02.34	
	Yvonne Harrison	Puerto Rico	DNF	

=== 4 × 100 meters relay ===
July 29

Rank	Team	Name	Time	Notes
1st place, gold medalist(s)	Cuba	Virgen Benavides, Misleidys Lazo, Roxana Díaz, Anay Tejeda	43.29	GR
2nd place, silver medalist(s)	Colombia	Yomara Hinestroza, Felipa Palacios, Darlenys Obregón, Norma González	44.32	
3rd place, bronze medalist(s)	Bahamas	Savatheda Fynes, Shandria Brown, Tamicka Clarke, T'Shonda Webb	44.34	
4	Puerto Rico	Roxana Mercado, Militza Castro, Jennifer Gutiérrez, Celiangeli Morales	45.05	
5	Saint Kitts and Nevis	Nathandra John, Tanika Liburd, Tameka Williams, Virgil Hodge	45.06	
6	Dominican Republic	Nelsy Delgado, Marleny Mejía, Patricia Rodríguez, María Carmona	45.09	
	Jamaica	Nyoka Cole, Rosemarie Whyte, Marcia Woolery, Jenice Daley	DQ	
	Honduras		DNS	

=== 4 × 400 meters relay ===
Rank	Team	Name	Time	Notes
1st place, gold medalist(s)	Mexico	Ruth Grajeda, Ana Guevara, Gabriela Medina, Mayra González	3:29.92	
2nd place, silver medalist(s)	Jamaica	Clora Williams, Shevon Stoddart, Melaine Walker, Althea Chambers	3:32.86	
3rd place, bronze medalist(s)	Cuba	Ana Hachy Peña, Daimí Pernía, Yenima Arencibia, Zulia Calatayud	3:36.34	
4	Dominican Republic	Lorena de la Rosa, Maribel Pie, Yahaira Pérez, Venecia Senyois	3:39.77	
5	Colombia	María Alejandra Idrobo, Princesa Oliveros, Rosibel García, Norma González	3:41.42	
6	Trinidad and Tobago	Nickeisha Charles, Natalie Dixon, Romona Modeste, Josanne Lucas	3:50.89	
	Grenada		DNS	
	Puerto Rico		DNS	

=== 20 kilometers walk ===
July 25

Rank	Name	Nationality	Time	Notes
1st place, gold medalist(s)	Cristina López	El Salvador	1:38:26	
2nd place, silver medalist(s)	Evelyn Núñez	Guatemala	1:39:37	
3rd place, bronze medalist(s)	Sandra Zapata	Colombia	1:41:37	
4	Verónica Colindres	El Salvador	1:44:11	
5	Yarelis Sánchez	Cuba	1:46:13	
6	Carolina Flores	Venezuela	1:47:05	
7	María Bohórquez	Colombia	1:49:24	
	María Esther Sánchez	Mexico	DNS	
	Fabiola Godínez	Mexico	DNS	

=== High jump ===
July 29

Rank	Athlete	Nationality	1.65	1.70	1.73	1.76	1.79	1.82	1.84	1.86	1.88	1.90	1.93	1.95	Result	Notes
1st place, gold medalist(s)	Juana Arrendel	Dominican Republic	–	–	–	xo	o	xo	o	xxo	o	xo	o	xxx	1.93	
2nd place, silver medalist(s)	Caterine Ibargüen	Colombia	–	o	o	–	o	o	o	o	xo	xxx			1.88	
3rd place, bronze medalist(s)	Levern Spencer	Saint Lucia	–	–	–	o	o	o	o	xo	xxo	xxx			1.88	
4	Karen Beautle	Jamaica	–	o	o	o	o	o	o	o	xxx				1.86	
5	Marielys Rojas	Venezuela	–	o	o	o	o	o	xxx						1.82	
6	Patricia Sylvester	Grenada	–	o	o	xo	xxo	xxx							1.79	
7	Fabiola Ayala	Mexico	–	o	–	xo	xxx								1.76	
8	Yuleidis Limonta	Cuba	o	xo	–	xxx									1.70	
	Linda Louissaint	Haiti													DNS	

=== Pole vault ===
July 29

Rank	Athlete	Nationality	3.30	3.45	3.60	3.75	3.85	3.95	4.10	Result	Notes
1st place, gold medalist(s)	Maryoris Sánchez	Cuba	–	–	–	–	o	o	o	4.10	GR
2nd place, silver medalist(s)	Yarisley Silva	Cuba	–	–	–	–	o	o	xxx	3.95	
3rd place, bronze medalist(s)	Keisa Monterola	Venezuela	–	–	–	–	o	xxx		3.85	
4	Milena Agudelo	Colombia	–	–	–	–	xxo	xxx		3.85	
5	Alexandra González	Puerto Rico	–	–	–	xo	–	xxx		3.75	
6	Consuelo Canino	Puerto Rico	–	o	xxx					3.45	
7	Peggy Ovalle	Guatemala	o	xxx						3.30	
	Cecilia Villar	Mexico	–	–	xxx					NM	

=== Long jump ===
July 26

Rank	Athlete	Nationality	#1	#2	#3	#4	#5	#6	Result	Notes
1st place, gold medalist(s)	Yudelkis Fernández	Cuba	6.21	6.19	x	6.37	6.37	6.31	6.37	
2nd place, silver medalist(s)	Caterine Ibargüen	Colombia	6.23	6.36	6.32	x	6.31	6.10	6.36	
3rd place, bronze medalist(s)	Tanika Liburd	Saint Kitts and Nevis	x	6.16	5.54	6.23	x	6.06	6.23	
4	Charisse Bacchus	Trinidad and Tobago	x	6.06	5.87	5.82	6.01	6.13	6.13	
5	Jovanee Jarrett	Jamaica	5.90	6.02	5.21	5.93	5.87	x	6.02	
6	Adriana Severino	Dominican Republic	5.54	5.91	x	5.80	5.63	x	5.91	
7	Sheron Mark	Trinidad and Tobago	5.73	5.68	5.50	5.88	5.66	5.52	5.88	
8	Claudette Martínez	Mexico	5.52	5.77	5.80	5.53	x	5.62	5.80	
9	Jennifer Arveláez	Venezuela	5.54	5.71	5.43				5.71	
10	Linda Louissaint	Haiti	5.50	5.65	x				5.65	
11	Tricia Flores	Belize	5.34	5.57	5.60				5.60	
12	Patricia Sylvester	Grenada	x	x	5.18				5.18	
13	Valerie Jintoena	Suriname	4.92	4.94	x				4.94	

=== Triple jump ===
July 29

Rank	Athlete	Nationality	#1	#2	#3	#4	#5	#6	Result	Notes
1st place, gold medalist(s)	Mabel Gay	Cuba	x	13.93	x	x	13.37	14.20	14.20	
2nd place, silver medalist(s)	Yudelkis Fernández	Cuba	x	13.36w	x	13.87	13.67	12.22w	13.87	
3rd place, bronze medalist(s)	Johanna Triviño	Colombia	x	x	13.12w	13.54w	13.46	13.71	13.71	
4	Jennifer Arveláez	Venezuela	12.36	12.92	13.23	13.31	13.48	13.39	13.48	
5	Seidre Forde	Barbados	12.81w	12.34	12.82	x	12.83	13.00	13.00	
6	Sheron Mark	Trinidad and Tobago	x	x	12.84	12.64	12.94w	12.70	12.94w	
7	Aidé Yesenia Villarreal	Mexico	x	x	x	12.12	12.30	12.22w	12.30	
8	Valerie Jintoena	Suriname	11.55	x	x	x	11.42w	11.17	11.55	NR
	Linda Louissaint	Haiti							DNS	
	Adriana Severino	Dominican Republic							DNS	
	Patricia Sylvester	Grenada							DNS	

=== Shot put ===
July 27

Rank	Athlete	Nationality	#1	#2	#3	#4	#5	#6	Result	Notes
1st place, gold medalist(s)	Yumileidi Cumbá	Cuba	18.92	x	x	x	18.84	19.31	19.31	
2nd place, silver medalist(s)	Misleydis González	Cuba	x	18.69	18.41	18.67	x	18.80	18.80	
3rd place, bronze medalist(s)	Cleopatra Borel-Brown	Trinidad and Tobago	18.25	18.06	x	17.89	18.33	17.61	18.33	
4	Margarita Bernardo	Dominican Republic	14.72	16.15	15.13	14.80	15.32	14.76	16.15	
5	Zara Northover	Jamaica	15.57	15.55	15.78	15.58	15.10	15.54	15.78	
6	Annie Alexander	Trinidad and Tobago	14.47	14.57	14.94	x	15.53	x	15.53	
7	Mary Mercedes	Dominican Republic	x	14.35	14.75	14.62	14.06	x	14.75	
8	Nadia Alexander	Jamaica	14.67	14.52	x	x	14.26	14.17	14.67	
9	Tamara Lechuga	Mexico	13.10	14.38	13.92				14.38	
10	Shernelle Nicholls	Barbados	13.40	x	13.08				13.40	
11	Irais Estrada	Mexico	12.38	13.22	12.97				13.22	
	Joeanne Jadote	Haiti							DNS	

=== Discus throw ===
July 28

Rank	Athlete	Nationality	#1	#2	#3	#4	#5	#6	Result	Notes
1st place, gold medalist(s)	Yania Ferrales	Cuba	57.50	57.99	59.70	59.60	59.39	58.73	59.70	
2nd place, silver medalist(s)	Yarelys Barrios	Cuba	54.12	x	58.22	54.43	x	x	58.22	
3rd place, bronze medalist(s)	Keisha Walkes	Barbados	x	46.03	x	47.69	48.10	x	48.10	NR
4	Joeanne Jadote	Haiti	38.70	45.02	x	40.99	47.22	44.86	47.22	
5	Annie Alexander	Trinidad and Tobago	44.17	x	42.50	42.07	46.57	39.55	46.57	
6	Mary Mercedes	Dominican Republic	x	x	44.94	x	43.53	x	44.94	
7	Irais Estrada	Mexico	37.03	x	44.80	x	44.13	41.71	44.80	
8	Shernelle Nicholls	Barbados	x	37.99	42.06	x	37.50	42.34	42.34	

=== Hammer throw ===
July 27

Rank	Athlete	Nationality	#1	#2	#3	#4	#5	#6	Result	Notes
1st place, gold medalist(s)	Yipsi Moreno	Cuba	x	70.22	68.75	x	x	x	70.22	GR
2nd place, silver medalist(s)	Yunaika Crawford	Cuba	64.12	x	66.21	67.34	67.35	67.88	67.88	
3rd place, bronze medalist(s)	Johana Moreno	Colombia	59.66	x	62.28	65.51	63.15	60.46	65.51	NR
4	Amarilys Alméstica	Puerto Rico	62.69	x	x	x	x	60.14	62.69	
5	Johana Ramírez	Colombia	58.18	x	x	x	x	57.08	58.18	
6	Jéssica Ponce De León	Mexico	56.27	53.78	57.40	52.11	x	52.30	57.40	
	Joeanne Jadote	Haiti	x	x	x	–	–	–	NM	
	Natalie Grant	Jamaica							DNS	

=== Javelin throw ===
July 29

Rank	Athlete	Nationality	#1	#2	#3	#4	#5	#6	Result	Notes
1st place, gold medalist(s)	Sonia Bisset	Cuba	56.29	63.30	60.35	63.00	59.27	59.18	63.30	GR
2nd place, silver medalist(s)	Osleidys Menéndez	Cuba	x	58.44	59.64	59.54	x	x	59.64	
3rd place, bronze medalist(s)	Laverne Eve	Bahamas	56.89	57.29	55.37	54.93	x	54.86	57.29	
4	Olivia McKoy	Jamaica	49.57	56.82	52.86	53.54	51.09	54.29	56.82	
5	Zuleima Araméndiz	Colombia	54.65	53.66	56.03	54.29	54.77	54.20	56.03	
6	Dalila Rugama	Nicaragua	50.36	49.56	46.90	53.05	x	49.16	53.05	
7	Erma-Gene Evans	Saint Lucia	45.03	x	46.28	46.58	43.39	x	46.58	

=== Heptathlon ===
July 26–27

The highest mark recorded in each event is highlighted in yellow

Rank	Athlete	Nationality	100m H	HJ	SP	200m	LJ	JT	800m	Points	Notes
1st place, gold medalist(s)	Yuleidis Limonta	Cuba	14.14	1.84	12.79	25.01	6.38	37.32	2:23.27	5952	GR
2nd place, silver medalist(s)	Juana Castillo	Dominican Republic	14.39	1.81	13.18	25.39	5.38	40.02	2:19.78	5664	
3rd place, bronze medalist(s)	Gretchen Quintana	Cuba	13.84	1.69	12.18	24.42	5.61	33.95	2:18.54	5584	
4	Thaimara Rivas	Venezuela	14.45	1.66	12.42	26.01	5.60	43.07	2:25.60	5411	
5	Nazlhy Perea	Colombia	14.45	1.66	11.05	26.22	5.45	42.24	2:26.98	5225	
6	Francia Manzanillo	Dominican Republic	14.21	1.48	11.30	24.84	5.26	42.27	2:26.52	5144	
7	Yaritza Rivera	Puerto Rico	14.61	1.60	11.28	25.86	5.27	32.29	2:31.07	4887	
	Coralys Ortiz	Puerto Rico	14.44	1.57	12.10	25.90	DNS	–	–	DNF	
