= 2006 NACAC U23 Championships in Athletics =

IV NACAC Under-23 Championships in Athletics
- Dates: July 7–9
- Host city: Santo Domingo, Dominican Republic
- Venue: Estadio Félix Sánchez
- Level: U-23
- Events: 44
- Participation: 373 athletes from 32 nations

The 4th NACAC Under-23 Championships in Athletics were held in Santo Domingo, Dominican Republic on July 7–9, 2006. A detailed report on the results was given.

== Medal summary ==
Medal winners are published. Complete results can be found on the Athletics Canada, the AtletismoCR, the CACAC and the USA Track & Field website.

=== Men ===
Event	Gold		Silver		Bronze	
100 metres	Derrick Atkins (BAH)	10.15 CR	Carlos Moore (USA)	10.23	Chris Hargrett (USA)	10.26
200 metres	Otis McDaniel (USA)	20.61	Derrick Atkins (BAH)	20.69	Jared Connaughton (CAN)	21.14
400 metres	Ricardo Chambers (JAM)	45.09 CR	Lionel Larry (USA)	45.38	William Collazo (CUB)	45.72
800 metres	Duane Solomon (USA)	1:48.96	Adam Currie (CAN)	1:49.22	Geoff Martinson (CAN)	1:50.11
1500 metres	Maury Castillo (CUB)	3:47.52 CR	Leonel Manzano (USA)	3:47.64	Raúl Neyra (CUB)	3:48.10
5000 metres	Aaron Aguayo (USA)	14:54.55	Giliat Ghebray (USA)	14:55.52	Mark Steeds (CAN)	15:02.68
10000 metres	John Moore (USA)	30:16.03	Jonathan Castañeda (MEX)	30:37.08	Joseph Campanelli (CAN)	31:04.62
3000 metres steeplechase	José Alberto Sánchez (CUB)	9:06.42	Corey Nowitzke (USA)	9:08.63	Ryan Warrenberg (USA)	9:11.36
110 metres hurdles	Dominic Berger (USA)	13.78 =CR	Jason Richardson (USA)	13.87	Adalberto Amador (PUR)	14.37
400 metres hurdles	Kenneth Ferguson (USA)	48.80 CR	Ruben McCoy (USA)	49.56	Isa Phillips (JAM)	49.80
High jump	Keith Moffatt (USA)	2.27m CR	Donald Thomas (BAH)	2.21m	Michael Mason (CAN)	2.19m
Pole vault	Brad Gebauer (USA)	5.51m CR	Lázaro Borges (CUB)	5.25m	Jimmie Heath (USA)	5.05m
Long jump	Wilfredo Martínez (CUB)	8.03m CR	Carlos Jorge (DOM)	7.96m	Tyrone Smith (BER)	7.90m
Triple jump	Osniel Tosca (CUB)	17.01m CR	Wilbert Walker (JAM)	16.18m	Mike Whitehead (USA)	15.85m
Shot put	Garrett Johnson (USA)	20.64m CR	Russell Winger (USA)	19.35m	Reynaldo Proenza (CUB)	18.41m
Discus throw	Adam Kuehl (USA)	59.04m CR	Rashaud Scott (USA)	53.36m	Adonson Shallow (VIN)	50.19m
Hammer throw	Nick Owens (USA)	67.87m	Jake Dunkleberger (USA)	66.91m	Roberto Durruty (CUB)	66.28m
Javelin throw	Eric Brown (USA)	68.79m	Andrew Vogelsberg (USA)	66.69m	Roberto Blanco (MEX)	64.57m
Decathlon	Chris Richardson (USA)	7243 pts CR	Brandon Hoskins (USA)	7086 pts	Marcos Sánchez (PUR)	6756 pts
20 Kilometres Road Walk	Salvador Mira (ESA)	1:31:42 CR	Alejandro Rojas (MEX)	1:32:01	Juan Guerrero (MEX)	1:33:27
4 x 100 metres relay	United States; Garry Jones; Greg Bolden; Chris Hargrett; Carlos Moore	39.38	Bahamas; Adrian Griffith; Ravanno Ferguson; Derek Carey; Derrick Atkins	39.74	Trinidad and Tobago; Rondel Sorrillo; Marcus Duncan; Richard Thompson; Emmanuel Callender	39.98
4 x 400 metres relay	Jamaica; Huntley Thomas; Leford Green; Bryan Steele; Ricardo Chambers	3:03.86	United States; Reggie Dardar; Kenneth Ferguson; Carey Lacour; Lionel Larry	3:05.10	Bahamas; Jamal Moss; Michael Mathieu; Oscar Greene; Andretti Bain	3:06.95

=== Women ===
Event	Gold		Silver		Bronze	
100 metres	Cleo Tyson (USA)	11.25 CR	Shalonda Solomon (USA)	11.30	Carol Rodríguez (PUR)	11.40
200 metres	Shalonda Solomon (USA)	22.90 CR	Antonette Carter (USA)	23.05	Carol Rodríguez (PUR)	23.27
400 metres	Shana Cox (USA)	51.15 CR	Natasha Hastings (USA)	52.11	Clora Williams (JAM)	52.40
800 metres	Alysia Johnson (USA)	2:03.87 CR	Gabriela Medina (MEX)	2:05.02	Yuneysi Santiusty (CUB)	2:05.13
1500 metres	Shannon Rowbury (USA)	4:20.57 CR	Yuneysi Santiusty (CUB)	4:21.94	Jacqueline Malette (CAN)	4:24.33
5000 metres	Yanisleidis Castillo (CUB)	16:22.39 CR	Desiraye Osburn (USA)	16:22.61	Jacqueline Malette (CAN)	16:45.49
10000 metres	Stephanie Rothstein (USA)	37:57.94	Shannon Elmer (CAN)	38:42.87	Erika Méndez (PUR)	39:21.60
3000 metres steeplechase	Anna Willard (USA)	10:23.23 CR	Cassie King (USA)	10:36.97	Bevin Kennelly (CAN)	10:43.74
100 metres hurdles	Dawn Harper (USA)	13.06	Josanne Lucas (TRI)	13.26	Ashley Lodree (USA)	13.31
400 metres hurdles	Josanne Lucas (TRI)	55.99 CR	Nickiesha Wilson (JAM)	56.77	Erin Crawford (USA)	58.70
High jump	Levern Spencer (LCA)	1.81m	Fabiola Ayala (MEX)	1.78m	Natalie Sako (USA)	1.78m
Pole vault	Marjorie Sánchez (CUB)	4.20m CR	Jodi Unger (USA)	3.90m	Adrianne Vangool (CAN)	3.80m
Long jump	Yudelkis Fernández (CUB)	6.60m CR	Kierra Foster (USA)	6.48m	Brenda Faluade (USA)	6.43m
Triple jump	Yarianna Martínez (CUB)	14.28m CR	Erica McLain (USA)	13.92m	Tabia Charles (CAN)	13.62m
Shot put	Amarachi Ukabam (USA)	16.82m	Michelle Carter (USA)	16.74m	Sultana Frizell (CAN)	15.18m
Discus throw	Amarachi Ukabam (USA)	53.45m CR	Novelle Murray (CAN)	51.26m	Kate Hutchinson (USA)	47.40m
Hammer throw	Brittany Riley (USA)	66.30m CR	Arasay Tondike (CUB)	66.28m	Britney Henry (USA)	65.41m
Javelin throw	Dana Pounds (USA)	55.24m CR	Krista Woodward (CAN)	50.63m	Dayami Delgado (CUB)	50.17m
Heptathlon	Gretchen Quintana (CUB)	5810 pts CR	Juana Castillo (DOM)	5766 pts	Yasmiani Pedroso (CUB)	5570 pts
10 Kilometres Road Walk	Verónica Colindres (ESA)	50:29 CR	Leisy Rodríguez (CUB)	50:51	Tatiana González (MEX)	51:06
4 x 100 metres relay	United States; Brooklin Morris; Cleo Tyson; Shareese Woods; Shalonda Solomon	43.53 CR	Puerto Rico; Éricka Navas; Celiangeli Morales; Jennifer Gutiérrez; Érika Rivera	46.60		
4 x 400 metres relay	United States; Ashlee Kidd; Natasha Hastings; Deonna Lawrence; Shana Cox	3:29.05 CR	Mexico; Ana Martha Coutiño; Nallely Vela; Irma Gladys Durán; Gabriela E. Medina	3:41.66	Trinidad and Tobago; Kerry Barrow; Josanne Lucas; Abigail David; Janelle Clarke	3:44.23

== Medal table (unofficial) ==
* Host nation (Dominican Republic)

Rank	Nation	Gold	Silver	Bronze	Total
1	United States	28	22	10	60
2	Cuba	9	4	7	20
3	Jamaica	2	2	2	6
4	El Salvador	2	0	0	2
5	Bahamas	1	3	1	5
6	Saint Lucia	1	0	0	1
7	Mexico	0	5	3	8
8	Canada	0	4	11	15
9	Dominican Republic*	0	2	0	2
10	Puerto Rico	0	1	5	6
11	Bermuda	0	0	1	1
11	Saint Vincent and the Grenadines	0	0	1	1
Totals (12 entries)		43	43	41	127

== Participation ==
The participation of 373 athletes from all 32 NACAC member federations was reported.

- Anguilla (2)
- Antigua and Barbuda (3)
- Aruba (1)
- Bahamas (10)
- Barbados (8)
- Belize (3)
- Bermuda (2)
- British Virgin Islands (2)
- Canada (41)
- Cayman Islands (5)
- Costa Rica (5)
- Cuba (25)
- Dominica (1)
- Dominican Republic (58)
- El Salvador (5)
- Grenada (2)
- Guatemala (7)
- (Haiti) Haïti (2)
- Honduras (2)
- Jamaica (14)
- (Mexico) México (31)
- Montserrat (1)
- Netherlands Antilles (3)
- Nicaragua (2)
- Puerto Rico (27)
- Saint Kitts and Nevis (4)
- Saint Lucia (2)
- Saint Vincent and the Grenadines (5)
- Trinidad and Tobago (15)
- Turks and Caicos Islands (3)
- United States (80)
- U.S. Virgin Islands (2)
