= Marc Burns =

Trinidad and Tobago sprinter

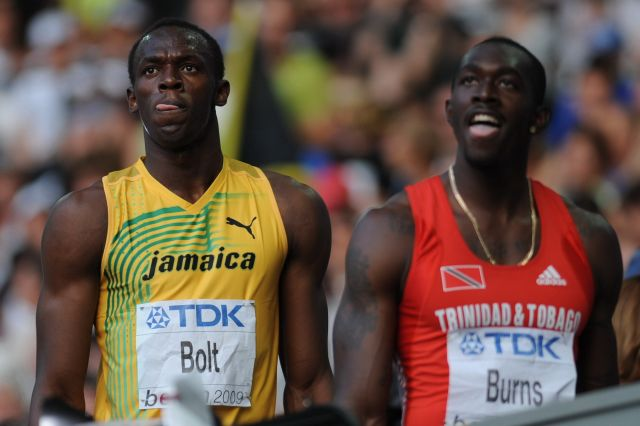
- Marc Burns (right) in Berlin 2009

Personal information
- Nationality: Trinidad and Tobago
- Born: 7 January 1983 (age 43) Port of Spain, Trinidad & Tobago
- Height: 1.85 m (6 ft 1 in)
- Weight: 84 kg (185 lb)

Sport
- Sport: Running

Achievements and titles
- Personal bests: 100 m: 9.96; 200 m: 20.57
Medal record
Men's athletics
Representing Trinidad and Tobago
Olympic Games
Gold medal – first place	2008 Beijing	4 × 100 m relay
Silver medal – second place	2012 London	4 × 100 m relay
World Championships
Silver medal – second place	2001 Edmonton	4 × 100 m relay
Silver medal – second place	2005 Helsinki	4 × 100 m relay
Silver medal – second place	2009 Berlin	4 × 100 m relay
Pan American Games
Silver medal – second place	2003 Santo Domingo	4 × 100 m relay
Commonwealth Games
Bronze medal – third place	2006 Melbourne	100 m
Bronze medal – third place	2014 Glasgow	4 × 100 m relay
World Junior Championships
Silver medal – second place	2002 Kingston	100 m
Pan American Junior Championships
Gold medal – first place	2001 Santa Fe	100 m
Bronze medal – third place	2001 Santa Fe	4 × 100 m relay
CAC Junior Championships (U20)
Silver medal – second place	2000 San Juan	4 × 100 m relay
Silver medal – second place	2002 Bridgetown	100 m
CAC Junior Championships (U17)
Silver medal – second place	1998 George Town	200 m
Silver medal – second place	1998 George Town	4 × 100 m relay
Silver medal – second place	1998 George Town	4 × 400 m relay
Bronze medal – third place	1998 George Town	100 m
CARIFTA Games Junior (U20)
Gold medal – first place	2002 Nassau	200 m
Silver medal – second place	2001 Bridgetown	100 m
CARIFTA Games Youth (U17)
Gold medal – first place	1998 Port of Spain	100 m
Gold medal – first place	1998 Port of Spain	200 m

Marc Burns (born 7 January 1983) is an athlete from Trinidad and Tobago specializing in the 100 metres and the 4 x 100 metres relay.

Burns competed for the Auburn Tigers track and field team in the NCAA.

Participating in the 2004 Summer Olympics, he was disqualified from his 100 metres heat due to a false start, thus failing to make it through to the second round.

Marc Burns placed second in the men's 100 metres dash at the Bislett Games IAAF Golden League meet in Oslo in July 2005, in preparation for the 2005 World Championships in Athletics. At the 2005 World Championships he won (together with Kevon Pierre, Jacey Harper and Darrel Brown) a silver medal. Later that year he won the World Athletics Final.

At the 2006 Commonwealth Games he won a bronze medal over 100 metres.

He was a finalist in the 100 m final at the 2007 World Championships in Osaka.

At the London Grand Prix he ran a season's best time of 9.97 seconds coming second behind former world record holder Asafa Powell.

In the 2008 Summer Olympics he competed at the 100 metres sprint and placed 2nd in his heat after Samuel Francis in a time of 10.46 seconds. He qualified for the second round in which he improved his time to 10.05 seconds, winning his race with opponents as Kim Collins and Tyrone Edgar. In the semi-finals he finished 3rd (9.97 seconds) in his heat behind Usain Bolt and Walter Dix and qualified for the final. There he finished his race in 7th place in a time of 10.01 seconds. Together with Keston Bledman, Aaron Armstrong and Richard Thompson he also competed at the 4 × 100 metres relay. In their qualification heat they placed first in front of Japan, the Netherlands and Brazil. Their time of 38.26 was the fastest of all sixteen teams participating in the first round and they qualified for the final. Armstrong was replaced by Emmanuel Callender for the final race and they sprinted to a time of 38.06 seconds, the second time after the Jamaican team, winning the silver medal. In 2022, Burns and his teammates received the gold medal due to Jamaica's Nesta Carter testing positive for the prohibited substance methylhexaneamine.

At the 2012 Summer Olympics, he was part of the Trinidad and Tobago team that won the silver medal in the men's 4 × 100 m relay. He was also part of the team that won the bronze medal at the 2014 Commonwealth Games.

Burns was coached most of his professional career by Henry Rolle.

== Personal bests ==
=== Outdoor ===
Distance	Time	Wind	Location / Date
100 m	9.96 s	+1.0 m/s	Port-of-Spain / 25 June 2005
200 m	20.57 s	—	Hermosillo / 21 May 2005

=== Indoor ===
Distance	Time	Location / Date
60 m	6.55 s	Birmingham /19 February 2011

Olympic Games
Preceded by George Bovell	Flagbearer for Trinidad and Tobago; London 2012	Succeeded by Keshorn Walcott
