= Denzel Ramirez =

Personal information
- Born: December 22, 1983 (age 42) Chaguanas, Trinidad and Tobago

Sport
- Sport: Track, Long-distance running
- Event(s): 1500 metres, 5000 metres
- College team: Troy

Achievements and titles
- Personal best(s): 1500 metres: 3:54.26; 5000 metres: 14:52.48; 10K run: 31:41; Half Marathon: 1:09:40

Denzel Ramirez (born 22 December 1983) is a long-distance runner. He represented Trinidad and Tobago at the 2005 Central American and Caribbean Championships and the 2006 Central American and Caribbean Games. He ran track with Colby Community College and Troy University.

== Running career ==
Ramirez grew up with one parent in Chaguanas and took up athletic in 2002. He first represented Trinidad and Tobago at the 2005 Central American and Caribbean Championships, where he ran 33:25 in the 10,000 metres race. In collegiate competition Ramirez first ran for Colby Community College; in 2005 he was named Colby's Men's Cross Country Athlete of the Year and Academic All-American by the National Junior College Athletic Association. Just months after the Kansas Relays, he competed for his country in the 5,000 metre race at the 2006 Central American and Caribbean Games, running 15:18.72 in hot weather. In 2007 he won the 5000 metres at the Sagicor National Open Track and Field Championship in a time of 14:54.16 ahead of Curtis Cox.

After his spell with Colby, Ramirez joined Troy University, where he earned a degree in Criminal Justice. Running for Troy, Ramirez ran a 3:54.26 in the 1500 metres at the 2009 Sun Belt Conference Outdoor Championships. In 2010, running for Trinidad and Tobago, Ramirez finished second in the IAAF South American Road Race Classic 10K, barely behind Guyana's Cleveland Forde.
