= 2005 World Championships in Athletics – Men's 4 × 100 metres relay =

2005 World athletics championships

The Men's 4 × 100 metres relay at the 2005 World Championships in Athletics was held at the Helsinki Olympic Stadium on August 12 and August 13. Great Britain just beat Jamaica (38.28, SB) and Australia (38.32, SB) to bronze medal position. The United States' team did not participate in the final, having bungled their first relay stick handoff in their qualification heat the previous day.

The winning margin was 0.02 seconds which as of 2024 remains the only time the men's 4 × 100 metres relay was won by less than 0.05 seconds at these championships.

== Medals ==
Gold:	Silver:	Bronze:
France: Ladji Doucouré; Ronald Pognon; Eddy De Lépine; Lueyi Dovy	Trinidad and Tobago: Kevon Pierre; Marc Burns; Jacey Harper; Darrel Brown	Great Britain: Jason Gardener; Marlon Devonish; Christian Malcolm; Mark Lewis-Francis

== Qualifying ==
From the initial two heats the first three teams in each plus two fastest losers progressed through to the final.

All times shown are in seconds.

- Q denotes automatic qualification.
- q denotes fastest losers.
- DNS denotes did not start.
- DNF denotes did not finish.
- AR denotes area record.
- NR denotes national record.
- SB denotes season's best.

=== Heat 1 ===
1. France (Oudéré Kankarafou, Ronald Pognon, Eddy De Lépine, Lueyi Dovy) 38.34s Q (WL)
2. Jamaica (Lerone Clarke, Dwight Thomas, Ainsley Waugh, Michael Frater) 38.37s Q (SB)
3. Germany (Alexander Kosenkow, Marc Blume, Tobias Unger, Marius Broening) 38.58 Q (SB)
4. Australia (Daniel Batman, Joshua Ross, Patrick Johnson, Matthew Shirvington) 38.65s q (SB)
5. Brazil (Cláudio Roberto Souza, Bruno Pacheco, Basílio de Moraes, André da Silva) 38.92s (SB)
6. Finland (Markus Pöyhönen, Nghi Tran, Jarkko Ruostekivi, Tommi Hartonen) 39.30s (NR)
- United States (Mardy Scales, Leonard Scott, Tyson Gay, Maurice Greene) DNF

=== Heat 2 ===
1. Trinidad and Tobago (Kevon Pierre, Marc Burns, Jacey Harper, Darrel Brown) 38.28s Q (WL)
2. Great Britain (Jason Gardener, Marlon Devonish, Christian Malcolm, Mark Lewis-Francis) 38.32s Q (SB)
3. Japan (Nobuharu Asahara, Shinji Takahira, Tatsuro Yoshino, Shingo Suetsugu) 38.46s Q (SB)
4. Netherlands Antilles (Geronimo Goeloe, Charlton Rafaela, Jairo Duzant, Churandy Martina) 38.60 q (NR)
5. Canada (Richard Adu-Bobie, Pierre Browne, Anson Henry, Nicolas Macrozonaris) 38.67s (SB)
6. Nigeria (Olusoji Fasuba, Uchenna Emedolu, Chinedu Oriala, Deji Aliu) 39.29s (SB)
- Italy (Luca Verdecchia, Simone Collio, Massimiliano Donati, Andrew Howe) DQ
- Poland (Michał Bielczyk, Marcin Jędrusiński, Marcin Nowak, Marcin Urbaś) DNF

== Final ==
1. France (Ladji Doucouré, Ronald Pognon, Eddy De Lépine, Lueyi Dovy) 38.08s (WL)
2. Trinidad and Tobago (Kevon Pierre, Marc Burns, Jacey Harper, Darrel Brown) 38.10s (NR)
3. Great Britain (Jason Gardener, Marlon Devonish, Christian Malcolm, Mark Lewis-Francis) 38.27s (SB)
4. Jamaica (Lerone Clarke, Dwight Thomas, Ainsley Waugh, Michael Frater) 38.28s (SB)
5. Australia (Daniel Batman, Joshua Ross, Kristopher Neofytou, Patrick Johnson) 38.32s (SB)
6. Netherlands Antilles (Geronimo Goeloe, Charlton Rafaela, Jairo Duzant, Churandy Martina) 38.45 (NR)
7. Germany (Alexander Kosenkow, Marc Blume, Tobias Unger, Marius Broening) 38.48 (SB)
8. Japan (Shingo Suetsugu, Shinji Takahira, Tatsuro Yoshino, Nobuharu Asahara) 38.77s (SB)
