= Patricia Sylvester =

Grenadian long jumper (born 1983)

Personal information
- Full name: Patricia Sylvester
- Nationality: Grenada
- Born: 3 February 1983 (age 43) St. George's, Grenada
- Height: 1.75 m (5 ft 9 in)
- Weight: 59 kg (130 lb)

Sport
- Sport: Athletics
- Events: Long Jump; High Jump
- College team: Georgia Bulldogs

Patricia Sylvester (born 3 February 1983) is a Grenadian long jumper, high jumper, and triple jumper.

Her personal best jump is 6.71 metres, achieved in March 2008 in Atlanta. This is the Grenadian record. She also holds the Grenadian records in the high jump, with 1.85 metres, and the triple jump with 13.87 metres.

== Competition record ==
Year	Competition	Venue	Position	Event	Notes
Representing Grenada
2001	CARIFTA Games (U20)	Bridgetown, Barbados	7th	High jump	1.65 m
2001	CARIFTA Games (U20)	Bridgetown, Barbados	9th	Long jump	5.17 m
2002	CARIFTA Games (U20)	Nassau, Bahamas	5th	High jump	1.74 m
2002	CARIFTA Games (U20)	Nassau, Bahamas	10th	Long jump	4.95 m
2006	Central American and Caribbean Games	Cartagena, Colombia	6th	High jump	1.79 m
2006	Central American and Caribbean Games	Cartagena, Colombia	12th	Long jump	5.18 m
2008	Olympic Games	Beijing, China	21st (q)	Long jump	6.44 m
2009	Central American and Caribbean Championships	Havana, Cuba	9th	Long jump	5.93 m
2009	Central American and Caribbean Championships	Havana, Cuba	4th	Triple jump	13.76 m
2009	World Championships	Berlin, Germany	36th (q)	Long jump	5.92 m
2009	World Championships	Berlin, Germany	33rd (q)	Triple jump	13.22 m
2010	Commonwealth Games	Delhi, India	15th (q)	Long jump	5.91 m
