= Tanika Liburd =

Saint Kitts and Nevis athlete (born 1982)

Personal information
- Born: 20 May 1982 (age 44)

Sport
- Sport: Track and field
Medal record
Representing Saint Kitts and Nevis
Central American and Caribbean Games
Bronze medal – third place	2006 Cartagena	Long jump
Bronze medal – third place	2010 Mayaguez	4x100m relay

Tanika Liburd (born 20 May 1982) is an athlete representing Saint Kitts and Nevis who specialized in the long jump.

Liburd competed for the Southern Miss Golden Eagles track and field team in the NCAA.

Her personal best in the event is 6.67 metres outdoors (2010) and 6.33 metres indoors (2008). Both are current national records.

== Competition record ==
Year	Competition	Venue	Position	Event	Notes
Representing Saint Kitts and Nevis
2004	NACAC U-23 Championships	Sherbrooke, Canada	6th	Long jump	6.02 m w (wind: +5.0 m/s)
2005	Central American and Caribbean Championships	Nassau, Bahamas	13th (h)	100 m	11.89
2005	Central American and Caribbean Championships	Nassau, Bahamas	–	4 × 100 m relay	DNF
2005	Central American and Caribbean Championships	Nassau, Bahamas	4th	Long jump	6.45 m (w)
2006	Commonwealth Games	Melbourne, Australia	10th (q)	Long jump	6.27 m
2006	Central American and Caribbean Games	Cartagena, Colombia	11th (h)	100 m	11.63
2006	Central American and Caribbean Games	Cartagena, Colombia	5th	4 × 100 m relay	45.06
2006	Central American and Caribbean Games	Cartagena, Colombia	3rd	Long jump	6.23 m
2007	NACAC Championships	San Salvador, El Salvador	5th	4 × 100 m relay	45.15
2007	NACAC Championships	San Salvador, El Salvador	3rd	Long jump	6.12 m
2007	Pan American Games	Rio de Janeiro, Brazil	5th	4 × 100 m relay	44.14
2007	Pan American Games	Rio de Janeiro, Brazil	11th	Long jump	5.61 m
2008	Central American and Caribbean Championships	Cali, Colombia	4th	Long jump	6.29 m
2009	Central American and Caribbean Championships	Havana, Cuba	1st	4 × 100 m relay	43.53 (NR)
2009	Central American and Caribbean Championships	Havana, Cuba	3rd	Long jump	6.42 m
2009	World Championships	Berlin, Germany	11th (h)	4 × 100 m relay	43.98
2010	Central American and Caribbean Games	Mayagüez, Puerto Rico	3rd	4 × 100 m relay	44.43
2010	Central American and Caribbean Games	Mayagüez, Puerto Rico	5th	Long jump	6.25 m
2010	Commonwealth Games	Delhi, India	9th	Long jump	6.17 m
2011	Central American and Caribbean Championships	Mayagüez, Puerto Rico	11th	Long jump	5.71 m
