= Prince Kwidama =

Dutch Antillean sprinter (born 1985)

Personal information
- Born: 23 March 1985 (age 41)

Sport
- Sport: Track and field
Medal record
Representing Netherlands Antilles
Central American and Caribbean Games
Gold medal – first place	2006 Cartagena	4x100m relay
Bronze medal – third place	2010 Mayaguez	4x100m relay

Prince Kwidama (born 23 March 1985) is a Dutch Antillean sprinter.

In the 100 metres he reached the quarter-final at the 2007 Summer Universiade, semi-final at the 2008 Central American and Caribbean Championships. In the 200 metres he was knocked out in the heats at the 2003 Central American and Caribbean Championships.

In the 4 x 100 metres relay he won a gold medal at the 2006 Central American and Caribbean Games, finished sixth at the 2007 Pan American Games, was disqualified at the 2007 NACAC Championships and won a bronze medal at the 2010 Central American and Caribbean Games.

His personal best times were the modest 10.43 seconds in the 100 metres, achieved in May 2007 in Caracas; and 21.65 seconds in the 200 metres, achieved in April 2007 in El Paso, Texas.
