= Ibrahim Camejo =

Cuban long jumper (born 1982)

Personal information
- Full name: Ibrahim Camejo Sayas
- Born: June 28, 1982 (age 44) Isla de la Juventud, Cuba
- Height: 1.80 m (5 ft 11 in)
- Weight: 79 kg (174 lb)
Medal record
Men's athletics
Representing Cuba
Olympic Games
| Bronze medal – third place | 2008 Beijing | Long jump |
- Updated on 21 June 2013

Ibrahim Camejo Sayas (also Ibrain Camejo Zayas, born 28 June 1982) is a Cuban long jumper.

He won the bronze medals at the 2005 Central American and Caribbean Championships and the 2006 Central American and Caribbean Games. He then won the more prestigious bronze medal at the 2008 Olympic Games. He also competed at the 2005 World Championships without reaching the final round.

== Personal bests ==
His personal best jump is 8.46 metres, achieved in June 2008 in Bilbao.

| Event | Best | Venue | Date |
Outdoor
| Long jump | 8.46 m (wind: +0.3 m/s) | (Spain) Bilbao | 21 June 2008 |
| Triple jump | 15.75 m (wind: -0.3 m/s) | (Argentina) Santa Fe | 20 October 2001 |
Indoor
| Long jump | 8.05 m | (Sweden) Stockholm | 18 February 2009 |

== Competition record ==
| Year | Competition | Venue | Position | Event | Notes |
Representing Cuba
| 2001 | Pan American Junior Championships (U20) | Santa Fe, Argentina | 3rd | Triple jump | 15.75 m (wind: -0.3 m/s) |
| 2002 | Ibero-American Championships | Guatemala City, Guatemala | 1st | Long jump | 7.83 m A (wind: -1.3 m/s) |
| 2005 | Central American and Caribbean Championships | Nassau, Bahamas | 3rd | Long jump | 7.88 m (wind: +1.3 m/s) |
| 2005 | World Championships | Helsinki, Finland | 15th (q) | Long jump | 7.78 m (wind: +0.3 m/s) |
| 2006 | Central American and Caribbean Games | Cartagena, Colombia | 3rd | Long jump | 7.83 m (wind: +0.2 m/s) |
| 2008 | Olympic Games | Beijing, China | 3rd | Long jump | 8.20 m (wind: +0.2 m/s) |
| 2009 | ALBA Games | Havana, Cuba | 1st | Long jump | 8.14 m w (wind: +5.0 m/s) |
| 2009 | Central American and Caribbean Championships | Havana, Cuba | 10th | Long jump | 7.43 m (wind: +0.0 m/s) |
| 2009 | World Championships | Berlin, Germany | 33rd (q) | Long jump | 7.71 m (wind: +1.4 m/s) |
