= Wilbert Walker =

Jamaican triple jumper

Medal record

Athletics

Representing Jamaica

CARIFTA Games Junior (U20)
Gold medal – first place	2004 Hamilton	Heptathlon
Gold medal – first place	2003 Port of Spain	Heptathlon
Silver medal – second place	2004 Hamilton	Long jump
Silver medal – second place	2004 Hamilton	Triple jump

CARIFTA Games Youth (U17)
Bronze medal – third place	2001 Bridgetown	Long jump

Wilbert Walker (born 7 January 1985) is a Jamaican triple jumper. His personal best jump is 16.47 metres (indoor), achieved in March 2006 in Boston. He also has 8.13 metres in the long jump, achieved in May 2006 in Emporia.

He finished twelfth at the 2004 World Junior Championships, won the bronze medal at the 2006 Central American and Caribbean Games and finished eighth at the 2006 Commonwealth Games. He recently achieved a new mark of 16.76 in the men's triple jump at the Jamaica national trials in June of this year, he went on to the cac games where he finished fourth with a leap of 16.65 meters.

== Achievements ==
Year	Competition	Venue	Position	Event	Notes
Representing Jamaica
2001	CARIFTA Games (U17)	Bridgetown, Barbados	3rd	Long jump	6.62m (1.9 m/s)
2003	CARIFTA Games (U20)	Port of Spain, Trinidad and Tobago	1st	Heptathlon	4837 pts
2003	Pan American Junior Championships	Bridgetown, Barbados	6th	Long jump	7.17 m
2003	Pan American Junior Championships	Bridgetown, Barbados	6th	Triple jump	14.88 m
2004	CARIFTA Games (U20)	Hamilton, Bermuda	1st	Heptathlon	4977 pts w
2004	CARIFTA Games (U20)	Hamilton, Bermuda	2nd	Long jump	7.49m w (2.4 m/s)
2004	CARIFTA Games (U20)	Hamilton, Bermuda	2nd	Triple jump	15.69 w (2.2 m/s)
2004	World Junior Championships	Grosseto, Italy	12th	Long jump	7.10 m (wind: +0.9 m/s)
2005	Central American and Caribbean Championships	Nassau, Bahamas	6th	Triple jump	16.03 m (w)
2006	Commonwealth Games	Melbourne, Australia	8th	Triple jump	16.33 m
2006	NACAC U-23 Championships	Santo Domingo, Dominican Republic	4th	Long jump	7.65 m (wind: +1.2 m/s)
2006	NACAC U-23 Championships	Santo Domingo, Dominican Republic	2nd	Triple jump	16.18 m (wind: +1.0 m/s)
2006	Central American and Caribbean Games	Cartagena, Colombia	11th (q)	Long jump	7.40 m
2006	Central American and Caribbean Games	Cartagena, Colombia	3rd	Triple jump	16.35 m
2010	Central American and Caribbean Games	Mayagüez, Puerto Rico	4th	Triple jump	16.65 m
2010	Commonwealth Games	Delhi, India	5th	Triple jump	16.85 m
2011	Central American and Caribbean Championships	Mayagüez, Puerto Rico	3rd	Triple jump	16.01 m
2011	World Championships	Daegu, South Korea	24th (q)	Triple jump	15.97 m
2013	Central American and Caribbean Championships	Morelia, Mexico	6th	Triple jump	15.73 m
