= Herbert McGregor =

Jamaican long jumper (born 1981)

Personal information
- Born: 13 September 1981 (age 44)

Sport
- Sport: Track and field
Medal record
Representing Jamaica
Central American and Caribbean Games
Bronze medal – third place	2006 Cartagena	4x100m relay

Herbert McGregor (born 13 September 1981) is a Jamaican long jumper. His personal best jump is 8.08 metres, achieved in May 2008 in Fort-de-France.

At the 2006 Central American and Caribbean Games he finished fourth in the long jump and won a bronze medal in the 4 x 100 metres relay. He also competed at the 2008 Olympic Games without reaching the final.

== Achievements ==
Year	Competition	Venue	Position	Event	Notes
Representing Jamaica
2005	Central American and Caribbean Championships	Nassau, Bahamas	5th	Long jump	7.56 m (w)
2006	Central American and Caribbean Games	Cartagena, Colombia	3rd	4 × 100 m relay	39.45
2006	Central American and Caribbean Games	Cartagena, Colombia	4th	Long jump	7.78 m
2008	Central American and Caribbean Championships	Cali, Colombia	2nd	Long jump	7.90 m
2008	Olympic Games	Beijing, China	30th (q)	Long jump	7.64 m
2011	Pan American Games	Guadalajara, Mexico	14th (q)	Long jump	7.46 m
