= Clora Williams =

Jamaican athlete

Clora Williams (born 26 November 1983) is a Jamaican sprinter who specialized in the 400 metres. She is also known as a relay runner, winning a gold medal at the 2010 Central American and Caribbean Games and a silver medal at the 2006 Central American and Caribbean Games. She was also disqualified from a relay bronze at the 2010 World Indoor Championships due to an infraction by a team member.

== Career ==
Williams competed collegiately for the Texas A&M Aggies in the mid-2000s. She is best known for winning the 400 meters event at the NCAA Division I Outdoor Track and Field Championships in 2006. She ran in 51.06 in the semi-final and 51.11 in the final. 51.06 seconds was a huge improvement from her personal best the year before, 54.24 seconds, and would remain her lifeteime best. It was also the school record for the Texas A&M University.

The same year, Williams also picked up a bronze medal in the 400 meters at the 2006 NACAC U23 Championships (52.40) and finished fifth at the 2006 Central American and Caribbean Games. She also won a silver medal in the 4 × 400 meters relay at the 2006 Central American and Caribbean Games.

In 2006 she took the Big 12 championship titles both indoor and outdoor. During the NCAA Division I indoor championships of 2007, she won a gold medal in the 4 × 400 metres relay. She also won the Big 12 indoor championships of 2007, took the silver medal at the Big 12 outdoor championships and finished fifth individually at the 2007 NCAA Division I Outdoor Championships. At the 2007 NACAC Championships she won the silver medals individually as well as in the 4 x 400 meters relay.

In 2008 and 2009 she competed extensively in Europe and the Americas, but at no international championships. She then participated in the 4 × 400 metres relay at the 2010 World Indoor Championships, but the Jamaican team was disqualified. Originally, Williams won a bronze medal together with Bobby-Gaye Wilkins, Davita Prendergast and Novlene Williams-Mills in a Jamaican indoor record of 3:28.49 (also a Central American and Caribbean record). However, Bobby-Gaye Wilkins failed her drug test at the competition, which caused the disqualification of the whole Jamaican team.

At the 2010 Central American and Caribbean Games Williams won a gold medal in the 4 × 400 metres relay and finished fourth in the individual 400 meters (53.04). In 2011 she switched to mainly competing in the 800 meters event. After a bronze medal in that event at the 2011 Jamaican championships, she competed in the same event at the 2011 Central American and Caribbean Championships, but did not finish the final race. Her lifetime best in the 800 meters was also from the same year, 2:03.90 minutes achieved in July 2011 in Halifax.

== Personal life ==
She is a sister of Novlene Williams.
