= Athletics at the 2007 Pan American Games – Women's long jump =

Women's long jump at the Pan American Games

The women's long jump event at the 2007 Pan American Games was held on July 25 at the Estádio Olímpico João Havelange in Rio de Janeiro. The gold medal was won by Maurren Maggi of Brazil.

== Results ==
Rank	Athlete	Nationality	#1	#2	#3	#4	#5	#6	Result	Notes
1st place, gold medalist(s)	Maurren Maggi	Brazil	6.69	6.84	x	x	6.76	6.76	6.84	
2nd place, silver medalist(s)	Keila Costa	Brazil	x	6.52	6.73	x	6.57	x	6.73	
3rd place, bronze medalist(s)	Yargelis Savigne	Cuba	6.66	6.44	6.45	x	x	6.58	6.66	SB
4	Elva Goulbourne	Jamaica	5.91	6.45	6.40	6.48	x	x	6.48	
5	Rhonda Watkins	Trinidad and Tobago	6.42	6.27	x	6.20	x	6.31	6.42	
6	Jackie Edwards	Bahamas	6.32	6.31	x	6.21	X	6.37	6.37	
7	Shameka Marshall	United States	6.25	x	x	5.32	x	x	6.25	
8	Arantxa King	Bermuda	x	6.18	5.96	6.16	6.03	x	6.18	SB
9	Tameka Williams	Saint Kitts and Nevis	5.54	6.10	5.80				6.10	
10	Janay DeLoach	United States	5.54	5.99	6.04				6.04	
11	Tanika Liburd	Saint Kitts and Nevis	5.61	5.61	5.52				5.61	
12	Tricia Flores	Belize	5.60	–	–				5.60	
13	Michelle Vaughn	Guyana	5.34	–	–				5.34	
	Yudelkis Fernández	Cuba	x	x	x				NM	
