= Yudelkis Fernández =

Cuban long jumper (born 1985)

Personal information
- Full name: Yudelkis Fernández Luis
- Born: February 28, 1985 (age 41) Minas, Camagüey
- Height: 1.74 m (5 ft 9 in)
- Weight: 63 kg (139 lb)

Sport
- Country: Cuba
- Sport: Athletics
Medal record
Representing Cuba
Central American and Caribbean Games
Gold medal – first place	2006 Cartagena	Long jump
Silver medal – second place	2006 Cartagena	Triple jump
- Updated on 13 June 2013

Yudelkis Fernández Luis (Spanish pronunciation: [ʝuˈðelkis feɾˈnandes]; born 28 February 1985 in Minas, Camagüey) is a Cuban long jumper.

== Personal bests ==
Outdoot

- Long jump: 6.74 m A (wind: +0.4 m/s) – (Mexico) México City, 22 May 2004
- Triple jump: 14.10 m (wind: +0.4 m/s) – (Cuba) Havana, 17 March 2007

Indoor

- Long jump: 6.40 m (wind: +0.4 m/s) – (Spain) Valencia, 10 February 2007

== Competition record ==
Year	Competition	Venue	Position	Event	Notes
Representing Cuba
2002	Ibero-American Championships	Guatemala City, Guatemala	3rd	Long jump	6.10 m (wind: +0.4 m/s)
2002	Central American and Caribbean Junior Championships	Bridgetown, Barbados	4th	Long jump	6.04 m (wind: -0.1 m/s)
2002	World Junior Championships	Kingston, Jamaica	8th	Long jump	6.16 m (wind: +0.1 m/s)
2003	Pan American Junior Championships	Bridgetown, Barbados	1st	Long jump	6.46 m (wind: -0.4 m/s)
2003	Pan American Junior Championships	Bridgetown, Barbados	1st	Triple jump	13.89 m (wind: +0.0 m/s)
2004	World Junior Championships	Grosseto, Italy	5th	Long jump	6.18 m (wind: -0.4 m/s)
2004	World Junior Championships	Grosseto, Italy	4th	Triple jump	13.65 m (wind: +0.4 m/s)
2004	Ibero-American Championships	Huelva, Spain	2nd	Long jump	6.45 m (wind: -0.4 m/s)
2004	Olympic Games	Athens, Greece	30th (q)	Long jump	6.36 m (wind: -0.1 m/s)
2006	World Indoor Championships	Moscow, Russia	15th (q)	Long jump	6.19 m
2006	NACAC U23 Championships	Santo Domingo, Dominican Republic	1st	Long jump	6.60 m (wind: +1.0 m/s)
2006	Central American and Caribbean Games	Cartagena, Colombia	1st	Long jump	6.37 m (wind: +0.1 m/s)
2006	Central American and Caribbean Games	Cartagena, Colombia	2nd	Triple jump	13.87 m (wind: +1.4 m/s)
2007	ALBA Games	Caracas, Venezuela	2nd	Long jump	6.37 m (wind: -1.5 m/s)
2007	Pan American Games	Rio de Janeiro, Brazil	–	Long jump	NM
