= Maury Surel Castillo =

Cuban middle-distance runner

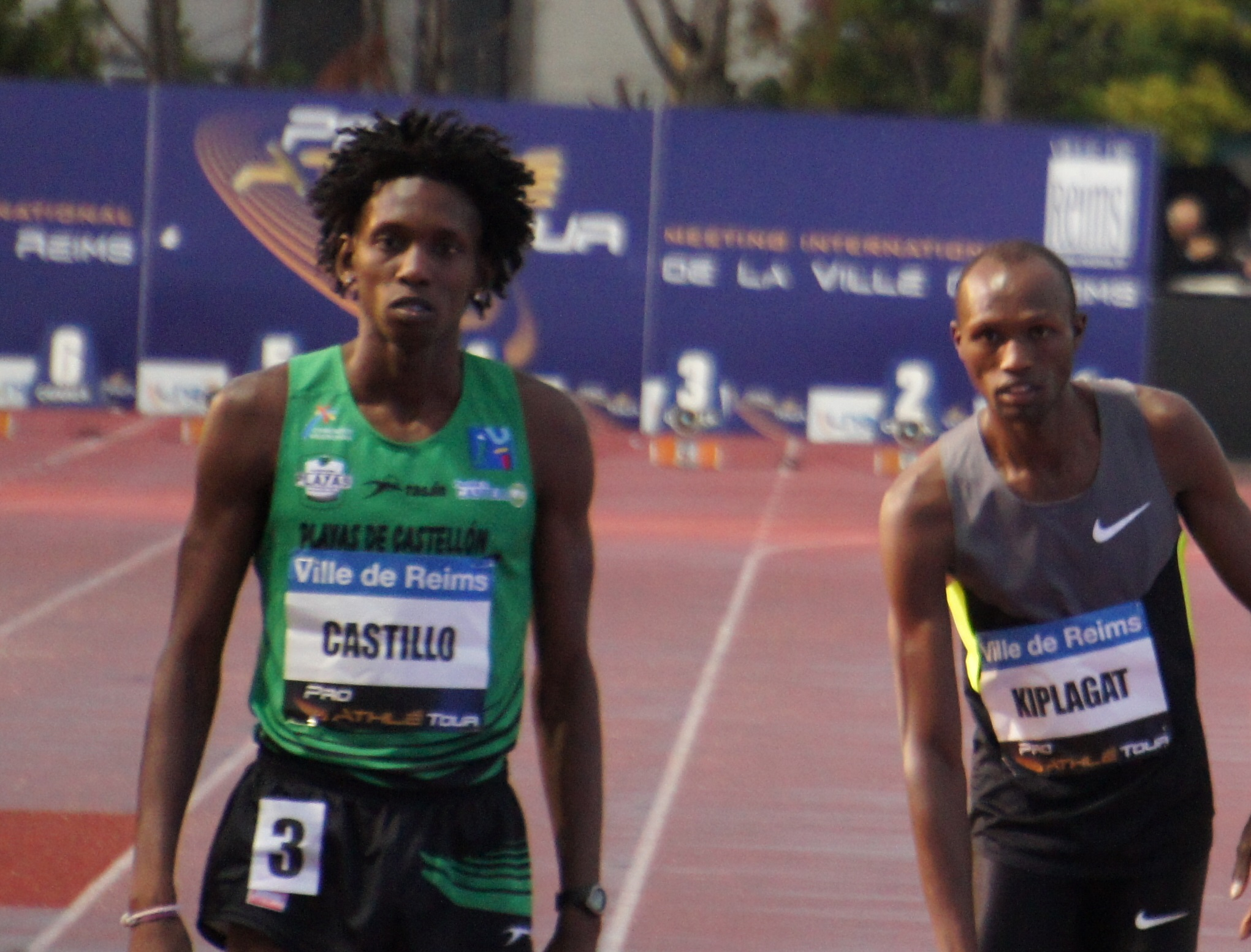
- Maury Surel Castillo (left) in 2013

Personal information
- Full name: Maury Surel Castillo Yera
- Born: October 19, 1984 (age 41)

Sport
- Country: Cuba
- Sport: Athletics
Medal record
Representing Cuba
Central American and Caribbean Games
Bronze medal – third place	2006 Cartagena	800m
Bronze medal – third place	2006 Cartagena	1500m
- Updated on 6 June 2013

Maury Surel Castillo (also Mauri, Mauris or Maurys; born 19 October 1984) is a Cuban athlete specializing in the 800 and 1500 metres events.

== Personal bests ==
- 800 metres: 1:44.89 min – (Spain) Huelva, 22 June 2012
- 1500 metres: 3:35.03 min – (Spain) Huelva, 7 June 2012
- 3000 metres: 7:58.3 min (ht) – (Cuba) Havana 20 June 2009
- 5000 metres: 14:08.3 min (ht) – (Cuba) Santa Clara 16 May 2008
- Half marathon: 1:07:50 hrs – (Cuba) Havana 28 January 2008

Indoor

- 800 metres: 1:47.85 min – (Belgium) Ghent, 18 February 2012
- 1500 metres: 3:43.06 min – (Spain) Antequera, 19 January 2013
- 3000 metres: 8:17.10 min – (Spain) Antequera, 7 January 2012

== Competition record ==
Year	Competition	Venue	Position	Event	Notes
Representing Cuba
2003	Pan American Junior Championships	Bridgetown, Barbados	1st	1500 m	3:47.13 min
2003	Pan American Junior Championships	Bridgetown, Barbados	3rd	5000 m	14:38.04 min
2005	Central American and Caribbean Championships	Nassau, Bahamas	1st	1500 m	3:47.89 min
2006	NACAC U-23 Championships	Santo Domingo, Dominican Republic	12th (h)	800m	2:12.31
2006	NACAC U-23 Championships	Santo Domingo, Dominican Republic	1st	1500m	3:47.52
2006	Central American and Caribbean Games	Cartagena, Colombia	3rd	800 m	1:47.60 min
2006	Central American and Caribbean Games	Cartagena, Colombia	3rd	1500 m	3:43.93 min
2007	ALBA Games	Caracas, Venezuela	1st	1500 m	3:42.43 min
2007	Pan American Games	Rio de Janeiro, Brazil	10th	1500 m	3:48.82 min
2008	Central American and Caribbean Championships	Cali, Colombia	8th	800 m	2:04.06 min
2008	Central American and Caribbean Championships	Cali, Colombia	3rd	1500 m	3:47.17 min
2009	ALBA Games	Havana, Cuba	1st	1500 m	3:44.12 min
2009	ALBA Games	Havana, Cuba	2nd	5000 m	14:21.29 min
2009	Central American and Caribbean Championships	Havana, Cuba	2nd	1500 m	3:42.49 min
2010	Ibero-American Championships	San Fernando, Spain	7th	1500 m	3:47.45 min
