= Reynaldo Proenza =

Cuban shot putter (born 1984)

Personal information
- Full name: Reynaldo Proenza Ribot
- Born: November 20, 1984 (age 41) San Antonio de los Baños, La Habana
- Height: 1.88 m (6 ft 2 in)
- Weight: 75 kg (165 lb)

Sport
- Country: Cuba
- Sport: Athletics
- Updated on 23 May 2013

Reynaldo Proenza Ribot (or Reinaldo Proenza Rivo, born 20 November 1984 in San Antonio de los Baños, La Habana) is a male shot putter from Cuba.

== Personal best ==
His personal best throw is 20.30 metres, achieved on 19 July 2008 in Havana.

== Achievements ==
Year	Competition	Venue	Position	Event	Notes
Representing Cuba
2001	World Youth Championships	Debrecen, Hungary	27th (q)	Discus throw (1.5 kg)	45.06 m
2003	Pan American Junior Championships	Bridgetown, Barbados	4th	Shot put (6 kg)	18.56 m
2005	ALBA Games	La Habana, Cuba	3rd	Shot put	17.93 m
2006	NACAC U-23 Championships	Santo Domingo, Dominican Republic	3rd	Shot put	18.41 m
2006	Central American and Caribbean Games	Cartagena, Colombia	2nd	Shot put	18.03 m
2008	Ibero-American Championships	Iquique, Chile	2nd	Shot put	19.42 m
2008	Olympic Games	Beijing, China	31st (q)	Shot put	19.20 m
2009	ALBA Games	La Habana, Cuba	1st	Shot put	19.37 m
2009	Central American and Caribbean Championships	Havana, Cuba	2nd	Shot put	18.81 m
2011	ALBA Games	Barquisimeto, Venezuela	1st	Shot put	18.72 m
2011	Pan American Games	Guadalajara, Mexico	7th	Shot put	19.19 m
