= Yuleidis Limonta =

Cuban heptathlete

Personal information
- Born: March 14, 1982 (age 44)

Sport
- Sport: Track and field
Medal record
Representing Cuba
Central American and Caribbean Games
Gold medal – first place	2006 Cartagena	Heptathlon

Yuleidis Limonta Ramírez (born March 14, 1982) is a female heptathlete from Cuba.

== Competition record ==
Year	Competition	Venue	Position	Event	Notes
Representing Cuba
2002	Ibero-American Championships	Guatemala City, Guatemala	1st	Heptathlon	5593 pts
2003	Pan American Games	Santo Domingo, Dominican Republic	5th	Heptathlon	5496 pts
2006	Central American and Caribbean Games	Cartagena, Colombia	8th	High jump	1.70 m
2006	Central American and Caribbean Games	Cartagena, Colombia	1st	Heptathlon	5952 pts
