= Rodney Green (athlete) =

Bahamian sprinter

Personal information
- Born: 8 December 1985 (age 40)

Sport
- Sport: Track and field
Medal record
Athletics
Representing Bahamas
Central American and Caribbean Games
Silver medal – second place	2006 Cartagena	4×100 m relay
CAC Championships
Silver medal – second place	2008 Cali	4x100 m relay
Bronze medal – third place	2009 Havana	4x100 m relay

Rodney Green (born 8 December 1985) is a Bahamian sprinter who specializes in the 100 metres.

He competed at the 2010 World Indoor Championships without reaching the final. In the 4 x 100 metres relay he won silver medals at the 2006 Central American and Caribbean Games and the 2008 Central American and Caribbean Championships.

His personal best times are 6.65 seconds in the 60 metres (indoor), achieved at the 2010 World Indoor Championships in Doha; and 10.28 seconds in the 100 metres, achieved in July 2008 in Winter Haven and June 2009 in Clermont. His 60 metres personal best was the Bahamian record at the time.

== Achievements ==
Year	Competition	Venue	Position	Event	Notes
Representing the Bahamas
2006	Central American and Caribbean Games	Cartagena, Colombia	2nd	4 × 100 m relay	39.44
2008	Central American and Caribbean Championships	Cali, Colombia	4th	100 m	10.34
2011	Central American and Caribbean Games	Mayagüez, Puerto Rico	4th	4 × 100 m relay	39.46
