= Jairo Duzant =

Personal information
- Born: 1 August 1979 (age 46) Willemstad, Netherlands Antilles

Sport
- Sport: Track and field
Medal record
Athletics
Representing the Netherlands Antilles
Central American and Caribbean Games
Gold medal – first place	2006 Cartagena	4x100 m relay
World Junior Championships
Silver medal – second place	1998 Annecy	200 m
CAC Junior Championships (U20)
Silver medal – second place	1998 George Town	200 m
Bronze medal – third place	1998 George Town	100 m

Jairo Duzant (born 1 August 1979) is a track and field sprinter from Curaçao. His personal best times are 10.37 seconds over 100 metres and 20.78 seconds over 200 metres.

== Achievements ==
Year	Competition	Venue	Position	Event	Notes
Representing Netherlands Antilles
1998	World Junior Championships	Annecy, France	6th	100 m	10.49 (wind: +1.6 m/s)
1998	World Junior Championships	Annecy, France	2nd	200 m	20.92 (wind: -0.2 m/s)
2000	NACAC U-25 Championships	Monterrey, Mexico	4th	200m	21.59 (wind: -3.9 m/s)
2004	South American U23 Championships	Barquisimeto, Venezuela	1st	4 × 100 m relay	39.18
2005	World Championships	Helsinki, Finland	6th	4 × 100 m relay	38.45
2006	Central American and Caribbean Games	Cartagena, Colombia	1st	4 × 100 m relay	39.29
