= Jacey Harper =

Trinidad and Tobago sprinter

Personal information
- Born: May 20, 1980 (age 46) Chaguanas, Trinidad and Tobago

Sport
- Sport: Track and field
- Club: Clemson Tigers
Medal record
Representing Trinidad and Tobago
World Championships
Silver medal – second place	2001 Edmonton	4x100m relay
Silver medal – second place	2005 Helsinki	4x100m relay
Central American and Caribbean Games
Bronze medal – third place	2006 Cartagena	100m

Jacey Harper (born May 20, 1980) is a male sprinter athlete from Trinidad and Tobago. He competed in the men's 4 × 100 metres relay at the 2000 Summer Olympics.

== Career ==
Harper was a two-time All-American sprinter for the Clemson Tigers track and field team.

A 100 metres specialist, Harper was a part of the Trinidad 4 × 100 m relay teams that won the bronze medal at the 2001 World Championships and the silver medal at the 2005 World Championships. He won the 100 m bronze medal at the 2006 CAC Games.

Following the ruling of December 13, 2005 which retroactively disqualified Tim Montgomery and henceforth the American team from the 2001 Championships, the Trinidad and Tobago athletes were promoted to silver medallists.

== Achievements ==
Year	Competition	Venue	Position	Event	Notes
Representing Trinidad and Tobago
1999	Pan American Games	Winnipeg, Canada	13th (h)	200 m	21.27
1999	Pan American Games	Winnipeg, Canada	5th	4 × 100 m relay	39.89
2000	Olympic Games	Sydney, Australia	12th (h)	4 × 100 m relay	39.12
2001	Central American and Caribbean Championships	Guatemala City, Guatemala	3rd	100 m	10.39
2001	World Championships	Edmonton, Canada	36th (qf)	100 m	10.45
2001	World Championships	Edmonton, Canada	2nd	4 × 100 m relay	38.58
2002	Commonwealth Games	Manchester, United Kingdom	21st (qf)	100 m	10.63
2002	Commonwealth Games	Manchester, United Kingdom	5th	4 × 100 m relay	38.97
2003	Central American and Caribbean Championships	St. George's, Grenada	4th	200 m	20.80
2003	Pan American Games	Santo Domingo, Dominican Republic	12th (sf)	100 m	10.63
2003	Pan American Games	Santo Domingo, Dominican Republic	4th	4 × 400 m relay	3:05.28
2003	World Championships	Paris, France	10th (sf)	4 × 100 m relay	38.84
2005	Central American and Caribbean Championships	Nassau, Bahamas	1st	4 × 100 m relay	38.47
2005	World Championships	Helsinki, Finland	18th (qf)	100 m	10.39
2005	World Championships	Helsinki, Finland	2nd	4 × 100 m relay	38.10
2006	Commonwealth Games	Melbourne, Australia	13th (sf)	100 m	10.46
2006	Central American and Caribbean Games	Cartagena, Colombia	3rd	100 m	10.33
2006	Central American and Caribbean Games	Cartagena, Colombia	6th	4 × 100 m relay	39.92
