= Andrew Hinds =

Barbadian sprinter (born 1984)

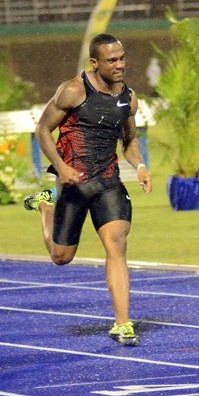

Personal information
- Nationality: Barbados
- Born: 25 April 1984 (age 42)
- Height: 5 ft 11 in (180 cm)

Sport
- Sport: Running
- Event(s): 100 metres, 200 metres
- Club: MVP Track & Field Club
- Coached by: Stephen Francis

Achievements and titles
- Personal best(s): 100 m: 10.03 s (Bridgetown 2009); 200 m: 20.38 s (Bridgetown 2009)
Medal record
Representing Barbados
Men's athletics
CAC Championships
Silver medal – second place	2013 Morelia	100 m
Bronze medal – third place	2009 Havanna	100 m
CAC Games
Bronze medal – third place	2006 Cartagena	200 m

Andrew Hinds (born 25 April 1984) is a Barbadian sprinter who specializes in the 100 metres. His personal best times are 10.03 seconds for the 100 metres, and 20.38 seconds for the 200 metres — both were achieved in Bridgetown, Barbados.

He was a bronze medalist in the 200 meters at the 2006 Central American and Caribbean Games, a bronze medalist in the 100m at the 2009 Central American and Caribbean Championships, and a silver medalist in the 100m at the 2013 Central American and Caribbean Championships.

Hinds has represented Barbados at the 2008 Summer Olympics in Beijing, qualified for the 2012 Summer Olympics in London, and competed at the IAAF 2011 World Championships in Athletics, where he reached the semi-finals.

His father Hadley Hinds is also an Olympian, having competed at the 1968 Summer Olympics in Mexico.
