= Leford Green =

Jamaican track and field athlete (born 1986)

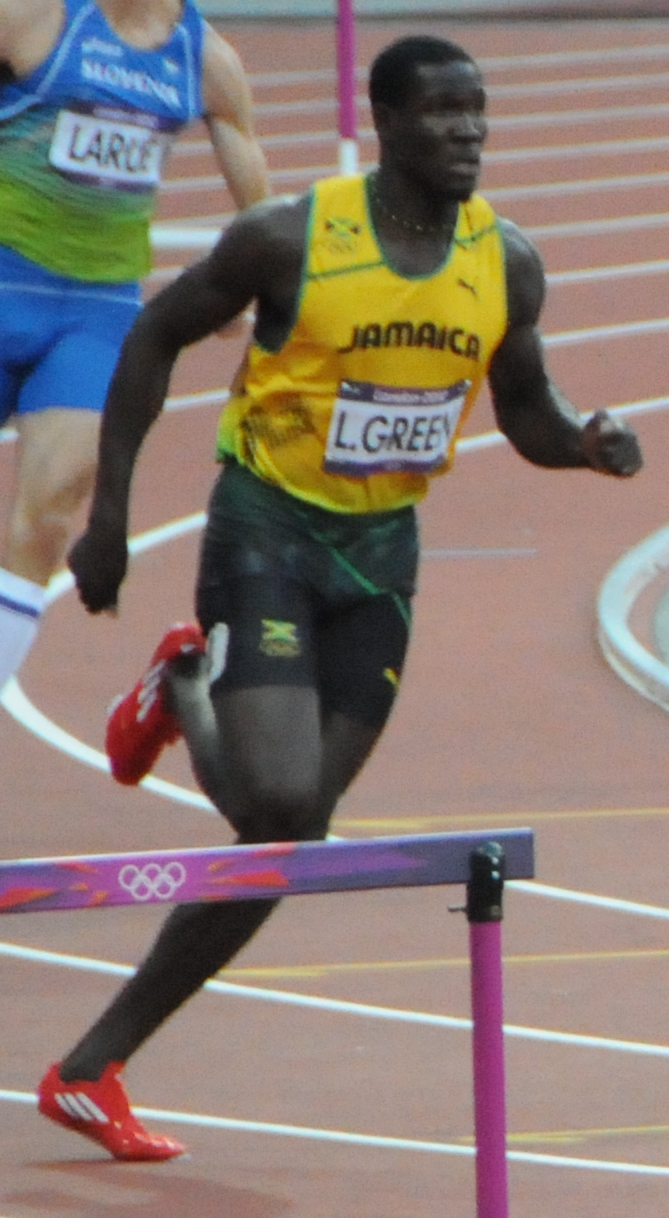
- Leford Green at the 2012 Summer Olympics

Personal information
- Born: 14 November 1986 (age 40)
- Height: 1.91 m (6 ft 3 in)
- Weight: 91 kg (201 lb)

Sport
- Country: Jamaica
- Sport: Athletics
- Event: 400m Hurdles
Medal record
World Championships
Bronze medal – third place	2011 Daegu	4×400 m relay
Central American and Caribbean Games
Gold medal – first place	2010 Mayagüez	400 m hurdles
Gold medal – first place	2010 Mayagüez	4×400 m relay
Gold medal – first place	2006 Cartagena	4×400 m relay
CAC Championships
Gold medal – first place	2011 Mayagüez	400 m hurdles
Bronze medal – third place	2011 Mayagüez	4x400 metres relay
CAC Junior Championships (U20)
Bronze medal – third place	2004 Coatzacoalcos	4x400 m relay
CARIFTA Games Junior (U20)
Bronze medal – third place	2005 Bacolet	400 m

Leford Green (born 14 November 1986, St. Mary, Jamaica) is a former Jamaican track and field athlete who specialised in the 400 metre hurdles and 400 metres. He is an alumnus of Johnson C. Smith University in Charlotte, North Carolina.

== Competition record ==
Year	Competition	Venue	Position	Event	Notes
Representing Jamaica
2004	Central American and Caribbean Junior Championships (U20)	Coatzacoalcos, Mexico	5th	400 m	49.17
2004	Central American and Caribbean Junior Championships (U20)	Coatzacoalcos, Mexico	3rd	4 × 400 m relay	3:12.92
2004	World Junior Championships	Grosseto, Italy	—	4 × 400 m relay	DQ
2005	CARIFTA Games	Bacolet, Trinidad and Tobago	3rd	400 m	47.52
2005	CARIFTA Games	Bacolet, Trinidad and Tobago	1st	4 × 400 m relay	3:09.94
2005	Pan American Junior Championships	Windsor, Canada	4th	400m	47.38
2005	Pan American Junior Championships	Windsor, Canada	2nd	4 × 400 m relay	3:08.64
2006	NACAC U-23 Championships	Santo Domingo, Dominican Republic	5th	400m	46.16
2006	NACAC U-23 Championships	Santo Domingo, Dominican Republic	1st	4 × 400 m relay	3:03.86
2006	Central American and Caribbean Games	Cartagena, Colombia	12th (sf)	400 m	47.14
2006	Central American and Caribbean Games	Cartagena, Colombia	1st (h)	4 × 100 m relay	39.35
2006	Central American and Caribbean Games	Cartagena, Colombia	1st	4 × 400 m relay	3:01.78
2007	Pan American Games	Rio de Janeiro, Brazil	14th (sf)	400 m	46.80
2007	Pan American Games	Rio de Janeiro, Brazil	6th	4 × 400 m relay	3:04.15
2007	World Championships	Osaka, Japan	4th	4 × 400 m relay	3:00.76
2009	Central American and Caribbean Championships	Havana, Cuba	10th (h)	400 m	47.11
2009	Central American and Caribbean Championships	Havana, Cuba	3rd	4 × 400 m relay	3:04.09
2009	World Championships	Berlin, Germany	11th (h)	4 × 400 m relay	3:04.45
2010	Central American and Caribbean Games	Mayagüez, Puerto Rico	1st	400 m hurdles	48.47
2010	Central American and Caribbean Games	Mayagüez, Puerto Rico	1st	4 × 400 m relay	3:01.68
2011	Central American and Caribbean Championships	Mayagüez, Puerto Rico	1st	400 m hurdles	49.03
2011	Central American and Caribbean Championships	Mayagüez, Puerto Rico	3rd	4 × 400 m relay	3:02.00
2011	World Championships	Daegu, South Korea	11th (sf)	400 m hurdles	49.29
2011	World Championships	Daegu, South Korea	3rd	4 × 400 m relay	3:00.10
2012	Olympic Games	London, United Kingdom	7th	400 m hurdles	49.12
2013	World Championships	Moscow, Russia	10th (sf)	400 m hurdles	48.88
2014	Commonwealth Games	Glasgow, United Kingdom	–	400 m hurdles	DQ
2015	World Championships	Beijing, China	20th (sf)	400 m hurdles	49.59
