= Ricardo Chambers =

Jamaican track and field athlete

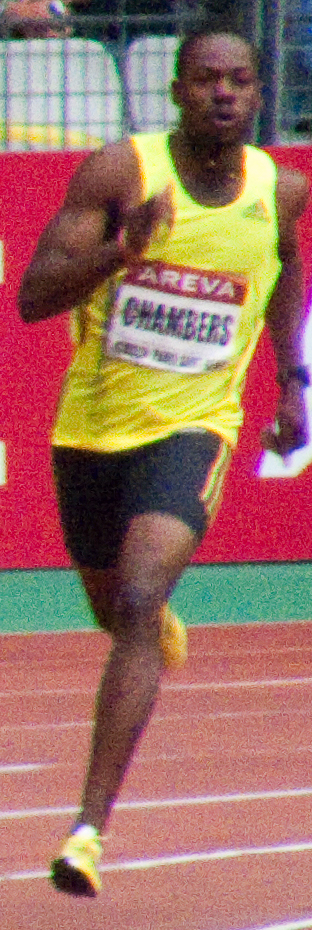
- Chambers at the 2009 Meeting Areva

Medal record

Men's athletics

Representing Jamaica

Continental Cup
Silver medal – second place	2010 Split	400 m

Ricardo Chambers (born 7 October 1984) is a Jamaican track and field athlete who specialises in the 400 metres.

Hailing from Trelawny Parish in Jamaica, he moved to the United States to study on a sports scholarship at Florida State University. Competing for the Florida State Seminoles, he won the silver medal over 400 m at the 2006 NCAA Championships, breaking the FSU record with a run of 44.71 seconds.

He enjoyed success at the NACAC Under-23 Championships later that year, setting a championship record of 45.09 seconds to win the 400 m and anchoring the Jamaican 4×400 metres relay team of Huntley Thomas, Leford Green and Bryan Steele to a second gold medal and record. He represented Jamaica at the 2006 Central American and Caribbean Games. He was fifth in the 400 m, easily beaten by Yeimer Lopez, but finished the competition on a high by winning the relay gold with Sanjay Ayre, Green and Steele, running a Games record of 3:01.78.

Chambers turned professional for the 2007 season and competed at the 2007 World Championships in Athletics. He made it to the semi-finals of the individual 400 m, but greater success came in the relay, as he took fourth place in the final for Jamaica. His next major competition was the 2008 Summer Olympics. He again was a semi-finalist in the men's 400 metres, but the Jamaican relay team performed poorly in the event final, failing to match their time from the heats and finishing in last place. He was the Jamaican champion the following year, but his third global appearance – at the 2009 World Championships in Athletics – held similar results; he finished third in his semi-final and was eliminated in the heats in the relay.

In the 2010 season he competed at the World Indoor Championships for the first time. He was a 400 m semifinalist but an injury to Ayre in the relay meant the Jamaican relay team did not finish. He improved his personal best to 44.54 seconds with a run at the Herculis meeting in Monaco, finishing second behind compatriot Jermaine Gonzales. He was selected to represent the Americas team over 400 m at the 2010 IAAF Continental Cup and he won his first medal at a global competition. He ran near his personal best, recording 44.59 seconds, to take the silver medal behind his teammate Jeremy Wariner. He closed the competition by running the anchor leg of the relay for the Americas team which won in a championship record of 2:59.00, breaking the USA's 29-year-old mark.
