= Gabriela Medina =

Gabriela Medina may refer to:

- Gabriela Medina (sprinter)
- Gabriela Medina (actress)

== See also ==
- Gabriel Medina, Brazilian surfer
