= Procopio Franco =

Mexican long-distance runner

Personal information
- Born: 8 July 1970 (age 55) Mexico City, Mexico

Sport
- Sport: Track and field
Medal record
Representing Mexico
Pan American Games
Bronze medal – third place	2007 Rio de Janeiro	Marathon
Central American and Caribbean Games
Gold medal – first place	2002 San Salvador	Marathon
Gold medal – first place	2006 Cartagena	Marathon

Procopio Franco Hernández (born 8 July 1970 in Mexico City) is a Mexican former long-distance runner who competed in the 2004 Summer Olympics and in the 2008 Summer Olympics.

== Achievements ==
Year	Competition	Venue	Position	Event	Notes
Representing Mexico
2002	Central American and Caribbean Games	San Salvador, El Salvador	1st	Marathon	2:17:38
