= Jamal Moss =

Bahamian sprinter (born 1986)

Personal information
- Born: 31 January 1986 (age 40)
Medal record
Athletics
Representing Bahamas
CARIFTA Games Junior (U20)
Bronze medal – third place	2005 Bacolet, Tobago	4 x 400 m relay

Jamal Moss (born 31 January 1986) is a male sprinter from Nassau, Bahamas, who mainly competes in the 400m. Moss competed for Hinds Community College. Moss ran the third leg of the 4 × 400 m Relay at the 2010 Commonwealth Games, as well as the third leg for the same event at the 2004 World Junior Championships in Athletics in Grosseto, Italy.

He won a bronze medal on the 4 × 400 m relay at the 2005 CARIFTA Games in Tobago. Moss also competed at the 2005 Pan American Junior Athletics Championships in Winnipeg, Canada.

== Personal bests ==
Event	Time (seconds)	Venue	Date
200m	21.63 (+1.1)	Nassau, Bahamas	26 June 2010
400m	46.81	Nassau, Bahamas	23 June 2007
400m Indoor	48.99	New York City, New York	20 February 2012
