= Athletics at the 2006 Central American and Caribbean Games =

Athletics at the XX CAC Games
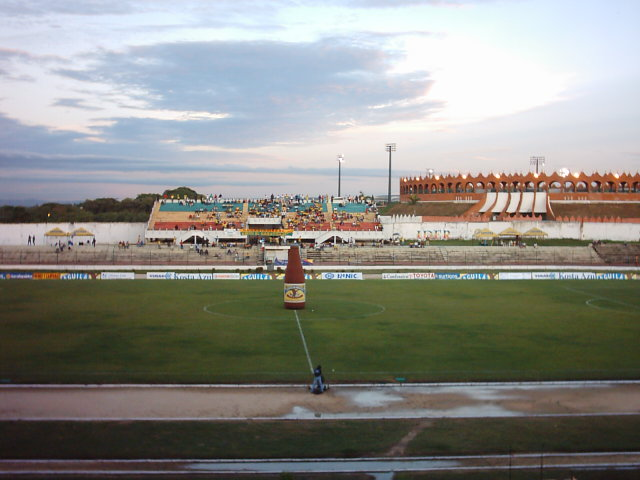
- The host stadium
- Dates: July 25–29
- Host city: Cartagena, Colombia
- Venue: Estadio Pedro de Heredia
- Events: 44
- Participation: 444 athletes from 31 nations
- Records set: 10 Games records

The athletics competition at the 2006 Central American and Caribbean Games took place at the Estadio Pedro de Heredia in Cartagena, Colombia and lasted from July 25 to July 29. There were 23 events for men and 21 for women. A total of ten Games records were broken at the competition, in addition to a number of national records.

The events were dominated by Cuban athletes, whereas teams like Jamaica did not send their strongest athletes. With 21 gold medals, Cuba won nearly half of the events and 45 medals were won by the country's athletes. Mexico was the next most successful nation, winning eight golds and fourteen medals overall. The hosts Colombia took third place on the medal tally, having won four golds, but also had the second greatest medal haul with nineteen in total. Jamaica, the Netherlands Antilles and Panama were the only other nations at the competition to win two golds or more.

== Results ==
=== Men ===
Games	Gold		Silver		Bronze	
100 metres	Churandy Martina; Netherlands Antilles	10.06 GR	Derrick Atkins; Bahamas	10.13	Jacey Harper; Trinidad and Tobago	10.33
200 metres	Xavier Brown; Jamaica	20.74	Hawar Murillo; Colombia	20.78	Andrew Hinds; Barbados	20.83
400 metres	Yeimer López; Cuba	45.28	Alleyne Francique; Grenada	45.44	Arismendy Peguero; Dominican Republic	45.55
800 metres	Andy González; Cuba	1:46.26	Sherridan Kirk; Trinidad and Tobago	1:46.55	Maury Castillo; Cuba	1:47.60
1500 metres	Juan Luis Barrios; Mexico	3:42.52	David Freeman; Puerto Rico	3:43.84	Maury Castillo; Cuba	3:43.93
5000 metres	Juan Luis Barrios; Mexico	14:09.08	Alejandro Suárez; Mexico	14:10.58	Norbert Gutiérrez; Cuba	14:13.50
10,000 metres	José David Galván; Mexico	29:40.08	Javier Alexander Guarín; Colombia	29:41.51	Norbert Gutiérrez; Cuba	29:50.53
110 m hurdles	Dayron Robles; Cuba	13.12 GR	Paulo Villar; Colombia	13.29 NR, =AR	Yoel Hernández; Cuba	13.51
400 m hurdles	Bayano Kamani; Panama	49.44	Ian Weakley; Jamaica	49.74	Bryan Steele; Jamaica	50.12
3000 m steeplechase	Alex Greaux; Puerto Rico	8:44.51	Néstor Nieves; Venezuela	8:44.86	José Alberto Sánchez; Cuba	8:46.05
Marathon	Procopio Franco; Mexico	2:24:35	Juan Carlos Cardona; Colombia	2:27:43	Alfredo Arevalo; Guatemala	2:28:27
4 × 100 m relay	Netherlands Antilles; Brian Mariano; Prince Kwidama; Jairo Duzant; Churandy Martina	39.29	Bahamas; Adrian Griffith; Derrick Atkins; Rodney Green; Dominic Demeritte	39.44	Jamaica; Lerone Clarke; Xavier Brown; Herbert McGregor; Carl Barrett	39.45
4 × 400 m relay	Jamaica; Sanjay Ayre; Leford Green; Ricardo Chambers; Bryan Steele	3:01.78 GR	Trinidad and Tobago; Renny Quow; Kevon Pierre; Jamil James; Damion Barry	3:02.65	Dominican Republic; Félix Sánchez; Arismendi Peguero; Carlos Santa; Yoel Tapia	3:03.25
20 km race walk	Luis Fernando López; Colombia	1:24:20	Eder Sánchez; Mexico	1:26:30	Luis Fernando García; Guatemala	1:29:50
High jump	Gilmar Mayo; Colombia	2.19	Trevor Barry; Bahamas	2.16	Gerardo Martínez; Mexico	2.16
Pole vault	Robinson Pratt; Mexico	5.50 NR	Dominic Johnson; Saint Lucia	5.20	David Rojas; Colombia	4.60
Long jump	Irving Saladino; Panama	8.29	Iván Pedroso; Cuba	7.92	Ibrahim Camejo; Cuba	7.83
Triple jump	Yoandri Betanzos; Cuba	17.46 GR	Alexis Copello; Cuba	16.85	Wilbert Walker; Jamaica	16.35
Shot put	Dorian Scott; Jamaica	20.34 NR	Alexis Paumier; Cuba	18.26	Reynaldo Proenza; Cuba	18.03
Discus throw	Yunior Lastre; Cuba	57.00	Jason Morgan; Jamaica	56.56	Héctor Hurtado; Venezuela	52.60
Hammer throw	Noleysi Bicet; Cuba	69.56	Iosvany Suárez; Cuba	67.62	Aldo Bello; Venezuela	62.55
Javelin throw	Guillermo Martínez; Cuba	84.91 GR	Yudel Moreno; Cuba	78.44	Noraldo Palacios; Colombia	74.10
Decathlon	Alexis Chivas; Cuba	7551	Carlos Paterson; Cuba	7203	Andrés Horacio Mantilla; Colombia	7157
WR world record | AR area record | CR championship record | GR games record | NR national record | OR Olympic record | PB personal best | SB season best | WL world leading (in a given season)

=== Women ===
Games	Gold		Silver		Bronze	
100 metres	Tahesia Harrigan; British Virgin Islands	11.15	Laverne Jones; U.S. Virgin Islands	11.50	Virgil Hodge; Saint Kitts and Nevis	11.52
200 metres	Roxana Díaz; Cuba	22.76 GR	Virgil Hodge; Saint Kitts and Nevis	23.09	Jade Bailey; Barbados	23.32
400 metres	Ana Guevara; Mexico	50.99	Hazel-Ann Regis; Grenada	51.16	Kineke Alexander; Saint Vincent and the Grenadines	52.04
800 metres	Zulia Calatayud; Cuba	2:05.26	Rosibel García; Colombia	2:05.78	Gabriela Medina; Mexico	2:06.15
1500 metres	Rosibel García; Colombia	4:18.29 GR	Yuneisy Santiusty; Cuba	4:19.32	Lysaira del Valle; Puerto Rico	4:21.84
5000 metres	Bertha Sánchez; Colombia	16:17:13	Dulce Maria Rodriguez; Mexico	16:18.15	Madaí Pérez; Mexico	16:19.38
Marathon	María Elena Valencia; Mexico	2:45:49	Yailén García; Cuba	2:51:43	Iglandini González; Colombia	2:54:05
100 m hurdles	Anay Tejeda; Cuba	12.86	Nadine Faustin; Haiti	12.91	Toni-Ann D'Oyley; Jamaica	13.10
400 m hurdles	Daimí Pernía; Cuba	55.32	Josanne Lucas; Trinidad and Tobago	55.60	Melaine Walker; Jamaica	55.97
4 × 100 m relay	Cuba; Virgen Benavides; Misleidys Lazo; Roxana Díaz; Anay Tejeda	43.29	Colombia; Yomara Hinestroza; Felipa Palacios; Darlenys Obregón; Norma González	44.32	Bahamas; Savatheda Fynes; Shandra Brown; Tamica Clarke; T-Shonda Webb	44.34
4 × 400 m relay	Mexico; Ruth Grajeda; Ana Guevara; Gabriela Medina; Mayra González	3:29.92	Jamaica; Clora Williams; Shevon Stoddart; Melaine Walker; Althea Chambers	3:32.86	Cuba; Ana Peña; Daimi Pernía; Yenima Arencibia; Zulia Calatayud	3:36.34
20 km race walk	Cristina López; El Salvador	1:38:26	Evelyn Núñez; Guatemala	1:39:37	Sandra Zapata; Colombia	1:41.37
High jump	Juana Arrendel; Dominican Republic	1.93	Caterine Ibargüen; Colombia	1.88	Levern Spencer; Saint Lucia	1.88
Pole vault	Maryoris Sánchez; Cuba	4.10 GR	Yarisley Silva; Cuba	3.95	Keisa Monterola; Venezuela	3.85
Long jump	Yudelkis Fernández; Cuba	6.37	Caterine Ibargüen; Colombia	6.36	Tanika Liburd; Saint Kitts and Nevis	6.23
Triple jump	Mabel Gay; Cuba	14.20	Yudelkis Fernández; Cuba	13.87	Johana Triviño; Colombia	13.71
Shot put	Yumileidi Cumbá; Cuba	19.31	Misleydis González; Cuba	18.80	Cleopatra Borel; Trinidad and Tobago	18.33
Discus throw	Yania Ferrales; Cuba	59.70	Yarelis Barrios; Cuba	58.22	Keisha Walkes; Barbados	48.10
Hammer throw	Yipsi Moreno; Cuba	70.22 GR	Yunaika Crawford; Cuba	67.88	Johana Moreno; Colombia	65.51 NR
Javelin throw	Sonia Bisset; Cuba	63.30 NR	Osleidys Menéndez; Cuba	59.94	Laverne Eve; Bahamas	57.29
Heptathlon	Yuleidis Limonta; Cuba	5952 GR	Juana Castillo; Dominican Republic	5664	Gretchen Quintana; Cuba	5584
WR world record | AR area record | CR championship record | GR games record | NR national record | OR Olympic record | PB personal best | SB season best | WL world leading (in a given season)

== Medal table ==
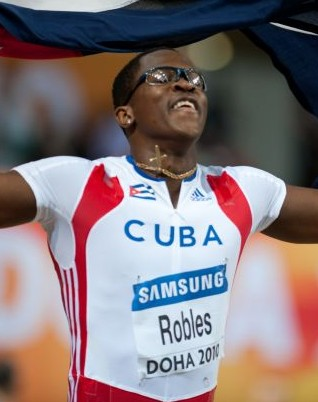
Cuban hurdler Dayron Robles broke a games record to win his gold medal.

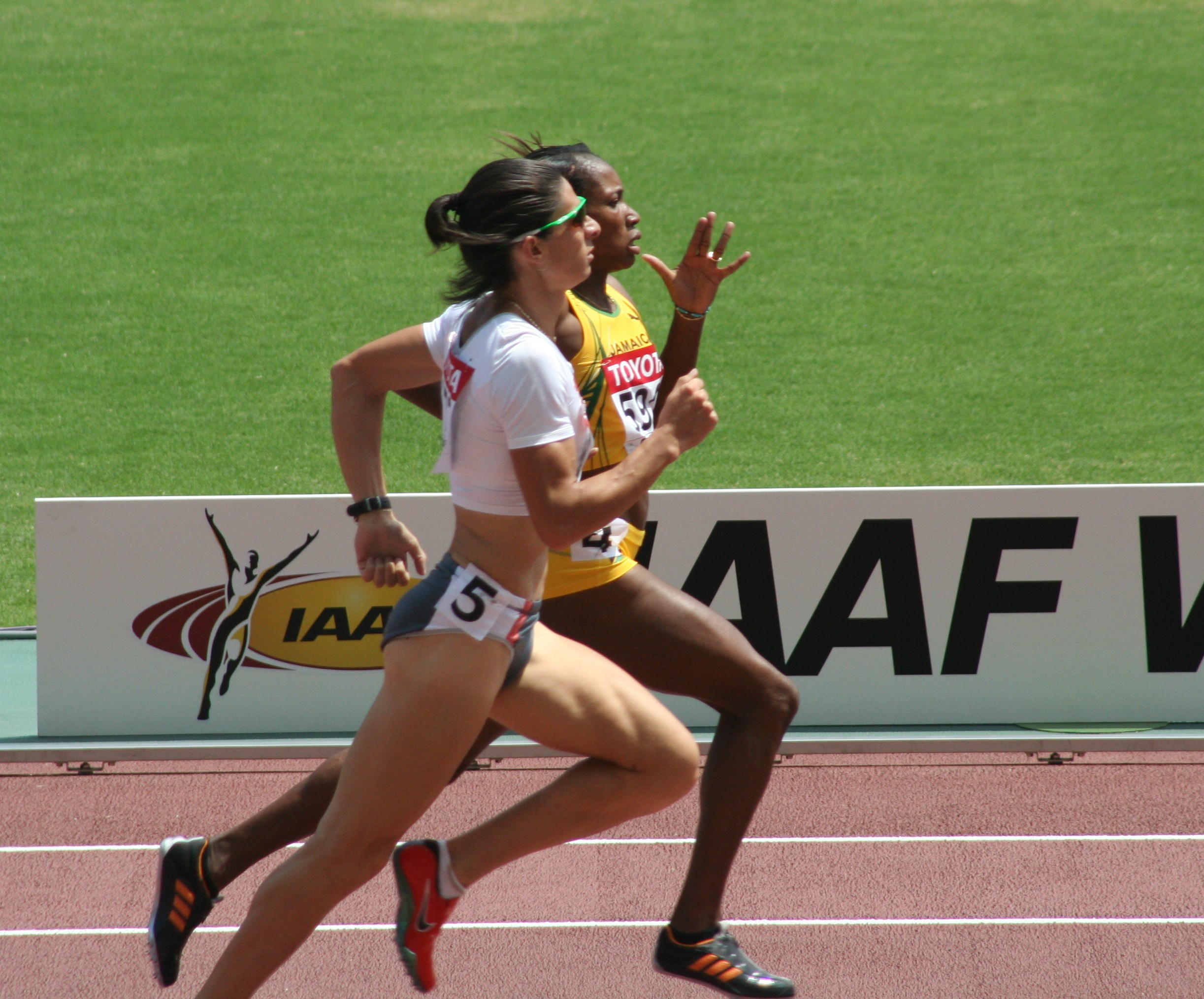
Ana Guevara of Mexico retained her 400 m title from 2002.

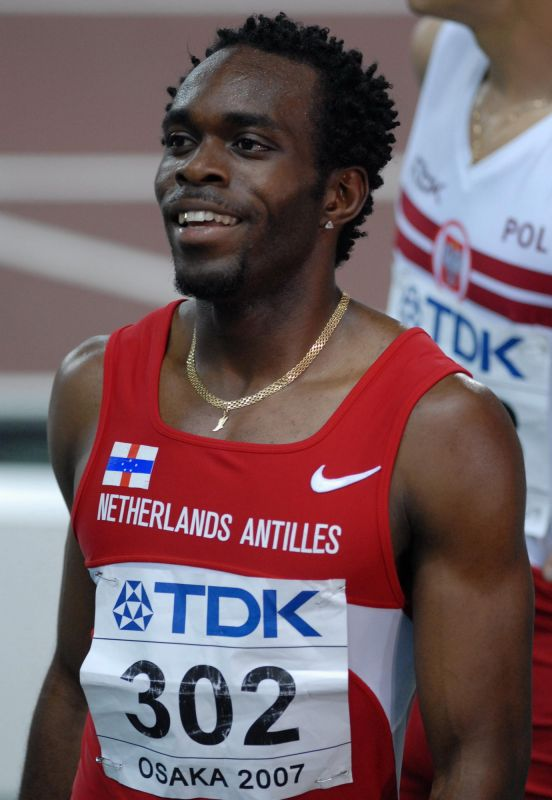
Churandy Martina won both golds for the Netherlands Antilles.

* Host nation (Colombia)

Rank	Nation	Gold	Silver	Bronze	Total
1	Cuba	21	14	10	45
2	Mexico	8	3	3	14
3	Colombia*	4	8	7	19
4	Jamaica	2	3	5	10
5	Netherlands Antilles	2	0	0	2
5	Panama	2	0	0	2
7	Dominican Republic	1	1	2	4
8	Puerto Rico	1	1	1	3
9	British Virgin Islands	1	0	0	1
9	El Salvador	1	0	0	1
11	Bahamas	0	3	2	5
11	Trinidad and Tobago	0	3	2	5
13	Grenada	0	2	0	2
14	Venezuela	0	1	3	4
15	Guatemala	0	1	2	3
15	Saint Kitts and Nevis	0	1	2	3
17	Saint Lucia	0	1	1	2
18	Haiti	0	1	0	1
18	U.S. Virgin Islands	0	1	0	1
20	Barbados	0	0	3	3
21	Saint Vincent and the Grenadines	0	0	1	1
Totals (21 entries)		43	44	44	131

- Note: Medal count excludes Dorian Scott's gold in the men's shot put as he was disqualified from the competition after a positive test for marijuana.

== Participating nations ==
- Antigua and Barbuda (6)
- Bahamas (19)
- Barbados (10)
- Belize (3)
- Bermuda (2)
- British Virgin Islands (7)
- Cayman Islands (4)
- Colombia (49)
- Costa Rica (3)
- Cuba (61)
- Dominica (5)
- Dominican Republic (36)
- Grenada (4)
- Guatemala (13)
- Guyana (3)
- Haiti (7)
- Honduras (11)
- Jamaica (39)
- Mexico (38)
- Netherlands Antilles (4)
- Nicaragua (2)
- Panama (7)
- Puerto Rico (26)
- Saint Kitts and Nevis (13)
- Saint Lucia (6)
- Saint Vincent and the Grenadines (4)
- El Salvador (4)
- Suriname (1)
- Trinidad and Tobago (23)
- United States Virgin Islands (6)
- Venezuela (28)
