= Kevon Pierre =

Trinidad and Tobago sprinter

Kevon Pierre (born March 30, 1982) is a sprinter from Trinidad and Tobago. Pierre traveled to the 2005 World Championships having set personal bests in both 100 and 200 metres (10.22 and 20.47) two months prior to the meet. He competed in the 200 metres contest, but was knocked out in the heats. In the 4 × 100 m relay event, however, he and the rest of the Trinidad and Tobago team won a silver medal. Kevon became a teacher at Coral Park Senior High School and coached track and field. He is currently pursuing a master's degree in biology and no longer teaches.

== Achievements ==
Year	Competition	Venue	Position	Notes
Representing Trinidad and Tobago
2005	World Championships	Helsinki, Finland	2nd	4 × 100 m relay
2006	Central American and Caribbean Games	Cartagena, Colombia	2nd	4 × 400 m relay
