= Yusneysi Santiusti =

Cuban-Italian middle-distance runner

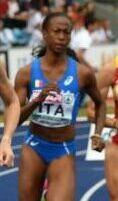
- Santiusti at 2017 European Team Championships

Personal information
- Born: 24 December 1984 (age 41) Havana, Cuba
- Height: 1.63 m (5 ft 4 in)
- Weight: 48 kg (106 lb)

Sport
- Sport: Track and field
- Event: 800 metres

Yusneysi Santiusti Caballero (born 24 December 1984) is an Italian middle-distance runner competing primarily in the 800 metres. She competed at the 2016 European Athletics Championships.

== Competition record ==
Year	Competition	Venue	Position	Event	Notes
Representing Italy
2016	European Championships	Amsterdam, Netherlands	5th	800 m	2:00.53
2016	Olympic Games	Rio de Janeiro, Brazil	18th (sf)	800 m	2:00.80
2017	World Championships	London, United Kingdom	32nd (h)	800 m	2:02.75
2018	Mediterranean Games	Tarragona, Spain	5th	800 m	2:04.24
2018	European Championships	Berlin, Germany	15h (h)	800 m	2:02.46

== See also ==
- Italian all-time top lists – 800 m
