= 2010 Ibero-American Championships in Athletics – Results =

These are the official results of the 2010 Ibero-American Championships in Athletics which took place on June 4–6, 2010 in San Fernando, Spain.

== Men's results ==
=== 100 meters ===
Heats – June 4
Wind:
Heat 1: -0.8 m/s, Heat 2: -1.0 m/s, Heat 3: +0.1 m/s

Rank	Heat	Name	Nationality	Time	Notes
1	1	Francis Obikwelu	Portugal	10.35	Q
2	2	Yunier Pérez	Cuba	10.40	Q
2	1	Roberto Skyers	Cuba	10.40	Q
4	2	Miguel López	Puerto Rico	10.43	Q
5	2	Daniel Grueso	Colombia	10.45	q
6	2	Nilson André	Brazil	10.45	q
7	3	Isidro Montoya	Colombia	10.54	Q
8	1	Sandro Viana	Brazil	10.55	
9	3	Yavid Zackey	Puerto Rico	10.58	Q
10	1	Rolando Palacios	Honduras	10.61	
11	2	Ricardo Monteiro	Portugal	10.62	
12	3	Franklin Nazareno	Ecuador	10.63	
13	3	Kael Becerra	Chile	10.64	
14	3	Daniel Molowny	Spain	10.65	
15	2	Cristián Reyes	Chile	10.69	
16	1	Carlos Jorge	Dominican Republic	10.72	
17	3	Miguel Wilken	Argentina	10.78	
18	1	Michel Mary	Uruguay	10.91	
19	3	Ancuiam Lopes	Guinea-Bissau	11.01	
20	1	Luis Morán	Ecuador	11.08	
21	2	Domingos Tomé	Guinea-Bissau	11.48	
22	1	Gilsson Tavares	Cape Verde	11.51	
23	3	Bonifacio Esono	Equatorial Guinea	11.61	
	2	Ángel David Rodríguez	Spain	DQ	FS1

Final – June 4
Wind:
-0.2 m/s

Rank	Lane	Name	Nationality	Time	Notes
1st place, gold medalist(s)	2	Nilson André	Brazil	10.24	
2nd place, silver medalist(s)	3	Yunier Pérez	Cuba	10.37	
3rd place, bronze medalist(s)	1	Daniel Grueso	Colombia	10.39	
4	6	Roberto Skyers	Cuba	10.40	
5	8	Yavid Zackey	Puerto Rico	10.43	
6	7	Miguel López	Puerto Rico	10.44	
7	5	Francis Obikwelu	Portugal	10.75	
8	4	Isidro Montoya	Colombia	10.85	

Extra – June 4
Wind:
+0.5 m/s

Rank	Lane	Name	Nationality	Time	Notes
1	2	Ángel David Rodríguez	Spain	10.35	SB
2	4	Ailson Feitosa	Brazil	10.53	
3	6	Fabiano Gilberto da Silva	Brazil	10.60	
4	8	Ricardo Monteiro	Portugal	10.64	
5	5	Iván Mocholí	Spain	10.70	
	3	Carlos Roberto de Moraes	Brazil	DQ	FS1
	7	Daniel Molowny	Spain	DNS	
	1	Francis Obikwelu	Portugal	DNS	

=== 200 meters ===
Heats – June 5
Wind:
Heat 1: -0.1 m/s, Heat 2: -0.6 m/s, Heat 3: -0.6 m/s

Rank	Heat	Name	Nationality	Time	Notes
1	3	Nilson André	Brazil	21.02	Q
2	3	Yazaldes Nascimento	Portugal	21.11	Q
3	3	Cristián Reyes	Chile	21.12	q
4	2	Sandro Viana	Brazil	21.13	Q
5	2	Gustavo Cuesta	Dominican Republic	21.35	Q
6	2	Rolando Palacios	Honduras	21.37	q
7	1	Yoel Tapia	Dominican Republic	21.40	Q
8	2	Yunier Pérez	Cuba	21.41	
9	2	Arnaldo Abrantes	Portugal	21.49	
10	1	Michel Mary	Uruguay	21.59	Q
11	3	Arturo Ramírez	Venezuela	21.61	
12	1	Luis Carlos Nuñez	Colombia	21.64	
13	1	Alberto Gavaldá	Spain	21.72	
14	3	Pau Fradera	Spain	21.74	
15	1	Franklin Nazareno	Ecuador	21.85	
16	1	Gracilino Barbosa	Cape Verde	23.02	
17	2	Gilsson Tavares	Cape Verde	23.08	
18	3	Enrique Ndong	Equatorial Guinea	24.68	
19	2	Ismael Bassangue	Guinea-Bissau	24.69	
	3	Daniel Grueso	Colombia	DNF	
	1	Roberto Skyers	Cuba	DNS	
	1	Domingos Tomé	Guinea-Bissau	DNS	
	2	Kael Becerra	Chile	DNS	

Final – June 6
Wind:
+0.2 m/s

Rank	Lane	Name	Nationality	Time	Notes
1st place, gold medalist(s)	6	Nilson André	Brazil	20.94	PB
2nd place, silver medalist(s)	1	Rolando Palacios	Honduras	21.20	
3rd place, bronze medalist(s)	5	Yazaldes Nascimento	Portugal	21.31	
4	2	Cristián Reyes	Chile	21.33	
5	7	Gustavo Cuesta	Dominican Republic	21.46	
6	4	Yoel Tapia	Dominican Republic	21.48	
	8	Michel Mary	Uruguay	DNF	
	3	Sandro Viana	Brazil	DQ	FS1

=== 400 meters ===
Heats – June 4

Rank	Heat	Name	Nationality	Time	Notes
1	2	Williams Collazo	Cuba	45.82	Q
2	2	Nery Brenes	Costa Rica	46.00	Q, SB
3	3	Eduardo Vasconceles	Brazil	46.17	Q
4	3	Freddy Mezones	Venezuela	46.56	Q
5	2	José Carlos Herrera	Mexico	46.76	q
6	3	Arismendy Peguero	Dominican Republic	46.78	q
7	2	Alvin Harrison	Dominican Republic	46.95	
8	1	Héctor Carrasquillo	Puerto Rico	46.97	Q
9	3	Takeshi Fujiwara	El Salvador	47.05	SB
10	1	Omar Longart	Venezuela	47.28	Q
11	1	Mark Ujakpor	Spain	47.37	
12	3	Mario Murguia	Mexico	47.47	
13	2	Wagner Cardoso	Brazil	47.50	
14	3	Marc Orozco	Spain	47.74	
15	1	António Rodrigues	Portugal	47.88	
16	1	Lenín Flores	Ecuador	48.30	SB
17	3	João Ferreira	Portugal	48.35	
18	2	Mariano Jiménez	Argentina	48.53	
19	2	Naiel de Almeida	São Tomé and Príncipe	50.36	
20	1	Enrique Ndong Nkara	Equatorial Guinea	56.54	
	1	Gracilino Barbosa	Cape Verde	DQ	FS1

Final – June 5

Rank	Lane	Name	Nationality	Time	Notes
1st place, gold medalist(s)	3	Nery Brenes	Costa Rica	45.19	PB
2nd place, silver medalist(s)	6	Williams Collazo	Cuba	45.33	SB
3rd place, bronze medalist(s)	5	Héctor Carrasquillo	Puerto Rico	45.60	NR
4	4	Eduardo Vasconceles	Brazil	46.05	
5	7	Freddy Mezones	Venezuela	46.25	
6	2	Arismendy Peguero	Dominican Republic	46.32	
7	8	Omar Longart	Venezuela	47.02	
8	1	José Carlos Herrera	Mexico	47.16	

=== 800 meters ===
June 6

Rank	Name	Nationality	Time	Notes
1st place, gold medalist(s)	Yeimer López	Cuba	1:45.36	CR
2nd place, silver medalist(s)	Kléberson Davide	Brazil	1:45.82	
3rd place, bronze medalist(s)	Antonio Manuel Reina	Spain	1:46.15	
4	Rafith Rodríguez	Colombia	1:46.97	PB
5	Fabiano Peçanha	Brazil	1:47.06	
6	Luis Alberto Marco	Spain	1:47.28	
7	James Eichberger	Mexico	1:47.42	PB
8	Nico Herrera	Venezuela	1:50.86	
9	Tiago Rodrigues	Portugal	1:52.70	
10	Tomás Squella	Chile	1:53.20	

=== 1500 meters ===
June 5

Rank	Name	Nationality	Time	Notes
1st place, gold medalist(s)	David Bustos	Spain	3:43.19	
2nd place, silver medalist(s)	Eduar Villanueva	Venezuela	3:43.72	SB
3rd place, bronze medalist(s)	Leandro de Oliveira	Brazil	3:44.08	
4	Diego Alberto Borrego	Mexico	3:45.12	
5	Nico Herrera	Venezuela	3:45.54	SB
6	Víctor Montaner	Spain	3:45.76	
7	Maury Surel Castillo	Cuba	3:47.45	
8	Iván López	Chile	3:49.13	
9	Bruno Albuquerque	Portugal	3:52.92	
10	Jose Carlos Campos	Angola	3:53.92	
11	Américo Monteiro	Cape Verde	4:20.10	

=== 3000 meters ===
June 6

Rank	Name	Nationality	Time	Notes
1st place, gold medalist(s)	Leandro de Oliveira	Brazil	8:15.55	
2nd place, silver medalist(s)	Reyes Estévez	Spain	8:15.58	
3rd place, bronze medalist(s)	Joilson da Silva	Brazil	8:16.58	
4	Marvin Blanco	Venezuela	8:16.88	
5	Álvaro Fernández	Spain	8:17.41	
6	Bruno Jesus	Portugal	8:22.46	
7	Josafat González	Mexico	8:23.21	PB
8	Santiago Figueroa	Argentina	8:25.41	PB
9	Mariano Mastromarino	Argentina	8:38.62	
10	Américo Monteiro	Cape Verde	8:56.02	
	Rui Silva	Portugal	DNS	

=== 5000 meters ===
June 4

Rank	Name	Nationality	Time	Notes
1st place, gold medalist(s)	Ayad Lamdassem	Spain	13:32.48	CR
2nd place, silver medalist(s)	Marílson Gomes dos Santos	Brazil	13:34.92	SB
3rd place, bronze medalist(s)	Miguel Barzola	Argentina	13:42.55	PB
4	Javier Guarín	Colombia	13:49.89	
5	David de Macedo	Brazil	13:53.47	PB
6	Eduardo Mbengani	Portugal	13:56.40	
7	Javier Carriqueo	Argentina	14:03.77	
8	Víctor Aravena	Chile	14:18.80	
9	Antonio Abadía	Spain	14:26.31	
10	Euclides Varela	Cape Verde	15:29.61	
	Bruno Jesus	Portugal	DNF	
	Tomás Luna	Mexico	DNS	

=== 110 meters hurdles ===
Heats – June 5
Wind:
Heat 1: -0.7 m/s, Heat 2: 0.0 m/s

Rank	Heat	Name	Nationality	Time	Notes
1	2	Jackson Quiñónez	Spain	13.80	Q
2	2	Hector Cotto	Puerto Rico	13.84	Q
3	1	Anselmo da Silva	Brazil	13.87	Q
4	1	Felipe Vivancos	Spain	13.94	Q
5	1	Jorge McFarlane	Peru	14.07	Q
6	2	Dayron Capetillo	Cuba	14.11	Q
7	2	Matheus Inocencio	Brazil	14.15	q
8	2	Rasul Dabó	Portugal	14.26	q
9	1	Ronald Bennett	Honduras	14.36	
10	1	Mariano Romero	Argentina	14.44	
11	1	Luís Sá	Portugal	14.58	
12	2	Renan Palma	El Salvador	14.61	

Final – June 6
Wind:
+0.1 m/s

Rank	Lane	Name	Nationality	Time	Notes
1st place, gold medalist(s)	6	Hector Cotto	Puerto Rico	13.54	NR
2nd place, silver medalist(s)	5	Jackson Quiñónez	Spain	13.65	SB
3rd place, bronze medalist(s)	4	Anselmo da Silva	Brazil	13.82	
4	2	Dayron Capetillo	Cuba	13.86	
5	3	Felipe Vivancos	Spain	13.94	
6	8	Matheus Inocencio	Brazil	13.95	
7	7	Rasul Dabó	Portugal	14.33	
	1	Jorge McFarlane	Peru	DNF	

=== 400 meters hurdles ===
Heats – June 4

Rank	Heat	Name	Nationality	Time	Notes
1	1	Omar Cisneros	Cuba	49.36	Q
2	2	Andrés Silva	Uruguay	50.57	Q
3	1	Mahau Suguimati	Brazil	51.18	Q
4	1	Ignacio Sarmieto	Spain	51.22	Q
5	1	Kurt Couto	Mozambique	51.23	q
6	2	José Ignacio Pignataro	Argentina	51.27	Q
7	2	Tiago Bueno	Brazil	51.55	Q
8	2	Allan Ayala	Guatemala	51.60	q
9	2	Diego Cabello	Spain	51.63	
10	1	Víctor Solarte	Venezuela	51.64	SB
11	2	Bruno Gualberto	Portugal	52.00	
12	1	Christian Deymonnaz	Argentina	52.88	
13	2	Pedro Semedo	Guinea-Bissau	53.40	

Final – June 5

Rank	Lane	Name	Nationality	Time	Notes
1st place, gold medalist(s)	4	Omar Cisneros	Cuba	49.19	SB
2nd place, silver medalist(s)	6	Andrés Silva	Uruguay	49.58	
3rd place, bronze medalist(s)	5	Mahau Suguimati	Brazil	49.87	
4	8	Tiago Bueno	Brazil	50.83	
5	1	Kurt Couto	Mozambique	51.47	
6	3	José Ignacio Pignataro	Argentina	51.55	
7	2	Allan Ayala	Guatemala	51.82	
8	7	Ignacio Sarmieto	Spain	52.26	SB

=== 3000 meters steeplechase ===
June 5

Rank	Name	Nationality	Time	Notes
1st place, gold medalist(s)	José Alberto Sánchez	Cuba	8:31.80	SB
2nd place, silver medalist(s)	Mario Teixeira	Portugal	8:32.21	
3rd place, bronze medalist(s)	Alberto Paulo	Portugal	8:34.52	PB
4	Francisco Javier Lara	Spain	8:34.83	SB
5	Marvin Blanco	Venezuela	8:41.40	
6	Alex Greaux	Puerto Rico	8:55.55	
7	Mariano Mastromarino	Argentina	9:02.62	
8	Álvaro Vásquez	Nicaragua	9:04.02	NR
9	Mauricio Valdivia	Chile	9:05.34	
10	Santiago Figueroa	Argentina	9:08.71	
11	Pep Sansa	Andorra	9:12.97	
	Mario Bazán	Peru	DNF	
	Antonio David Jiménez	Spain	DNF	

=== 4 x 100 meters relay ===
June 5

Rank	Lane	Nation	Competitors	Time	Notes
1st place, gold medalist(s)	4	Puerto Rico	Marcos Amalbert, Yavid Zackey, Luis López, Miguel López	39.31	
2nd place, silver medalist(s)	7	Spain	Iván Mocholí, Ángel David Rodríguez, Alberto Gavaldá, Daniel Molowny	39.45	SB
3rd place, bronze medalist(s)	5	Colombia	Álvaro Gómez, Luis Carlos Nuñez, Isidro Montoya, Daniel Grueso	39.76	SB
4	6	Argentina	Matias Robledo, Miguel Wilken, Pablo del Valle, Juan Manuel Jasid	40.08	
5	8	Dominican Republic	Carlos Jorge, Arismendy Peguero, Yoel Tapia, Gustavo Cuesta	40.15	
	3	Brazil	Carlos Roberto de Moraes Jr., Nilson André, Ailson Feitosa, Sandro Viana	DQ	IAAF 170.14
	2	Portugal	Ricardo Monteiro, Arnaldo Abrantes, Diogo Ferreira, Yasaldes Nascimento	DNS	

=== 4 x 400 meters relay ===
June 6

Rank	Nation	Competitors	Time	Notes
1st place, gold medalist(s)	Cuba	Omar Cisneros, Yeimer López, Yunier Pérez, Williams Collazo	3:04.86	SB
2nd place, silver medalist(s)	Brazil	Hederson Estefani, Wagner Cardoso, Kléberson Davide, Eduardo Vasconcelos	3:05.43	SB
3rd place, bronze medalist(s)	Venezuela	Freddy Mezones, Arturo Ramírez, Omar Longart, Alberth Bravo	3:05.53	SB
4	Dominican Republic	Gustavo Cuesta, Arismendy Peguero, Alvin Harrison, Yoel Tapia	3:05.99	
5	Spain	Marc Orozco, Mark Ujakpor, Pau Fradera, Adrian González	3:08.46	
	Argentina	José Ignacio Pignataro, Mariano Jiménez, Miguel Wilken, Christian Deymonnaz	DQ	IAAF 163.3b
	Portugal	Yazaldes Nascimento, Bruno Gualberto, João Ferreira, António Rodrigues	DNF	

=== 20,000 meters walk ===
June 5

Rank	Name	Nationality	Time	Notes
1st place, gold medalist(s)	Francisco Arcilla	Spain	1:24:38.4	PB
2nd place, silver medalist(s)	Yerko Araya	Chile	1:25:27.5	
3rd place, bronze medalist(s)	Pedro Isidro	Portugal	1:25:54.7	PB
4	Claudio Erasmo Vargas	Mexico	1:27:00.1	
5	Allan Segura	Costa Rica	1:27:51.5	SB
6	Juan Manuel Cano	Argentina	1:27:51.8	
7	José David Domínguez	Spain	1:29:31.4	
8	Moacir Zimmermann	Brazil	1:29:46.1	
9	Fabio González	Argentina	1:32:50.2	PB
10	Victor Mendoza	El Salvador	1:33:04.6	
	Mario José dos Santos	Brazil	DNF	
	Emerson Hernandez	El Salvador	DNF	
	Augusto Cardoso	Portugal	DQ	

=== High jump ===
June 5

Rank	Athlete	Nationality	2.00	2.06	2.09	2.12	2.15	2.18	2.20	2.24	2.29	Result	Notes
1st place, gold medalist(s)	Javier Bermejo	Spain	–	–	o	–	o	o	o	o	xxx	2.24	SB
2nd place, silver medalist(s)	Wanner Miller	Colombia	–	–	o	o	o	xxo	xxx			2.18	
3rd place, bronze medalist(s)	Carlos Layoy	Argentina	o	o	o	xo	xo	xxo	xxx			2.18	PB
4	Guilherme Cobbo	Brazil	–	–	o	o	o	xxx				2.15	
5	Santiago Guerci	Argentina	o	–	xo	xo	xo	xxx				2.15	
6	Roman Guliy	Portugal	o	o	o	o	xxx					2.12	
7	Simon Siverio	Spain	–	o	xo	o	xxx					2.12	
8	Diego Ferrín	Ecuador	–	o	–	xo	–	xxx				2.12	
9	Jorge Rouco	Mexico	–	o	xo	xxx						2.09	
10	Paulo Gonçalves	Portugal	xxo	xxx								2.00	

=== Pole vault ===
June 5

Rank	Athlete	Nationality	4.75	4.90	5.05	5.20	5.30	5.40	5.50	5.55	5.60	5.65	5.72	Result	Notes
1st place, gold medalist(s)	Lázaro Borges	Cuba	–	–	–	o	–	o	o	–	o	–	xxx	5.60	SB
2nd place, silver medalist(s)	Fábio Gomes da Silva	Brazil	–	–	–	xo	–	o	–	xo	–	xxx		5.55	
3rd place, bronze medalist(s)	Edi Maia	Portugal	–	xo	–	o	o	xxx						5.30	
4	Igor Bychkov	Spain	–	–	xo	–	xo	–	–	xx–	x			5.30	
5	Christian Sánchez	Mexico	–	–	xo	xo	xxx							5.20	
6	Javier Gazol	Spain	–	–	o	xxo	xxx							5.20	
7	Diogo Ferreira	Portugal	o	o	xo	xxx								5.05	
7	Henrique Martins	Brazil	o	o	xo	xxx								5.05	
9	César González	Venezuela	o	xxo	xxx									4.90	
10	Marcelo Terra	Argentina	xxo	–	xxx									4.75	

=== Long jump ===
June 6

Rank	Athlete	Nationality	#1	#2	#3	#4	#5	#6	Result	Notes
1st place, gold medalist(s)	Wilfredo Martínez	Cuba	7.84	5.76	x	7.94	7.94	8.04	8.04	
2nd place, silver medalist(s)	Joan Lino Martínez	Spain	7.46	7.11	7.35	7.68	7.43	7.68	7.68	SB
3rd place, bronze medalist(s)	Mauro Vinícius da Silva	Brazil	7.57	7.60	x	x	7.59	x	7.60	
4	Hugo Chila	Ecuador	7.58	7.58	7.44	7.30	7.34	7.39	7.58	
5	Marcos Chuva	Portugal	7.57	6.52	7.45	x	7.58	7.34	7.58	
6	Rubens dos Santos Junior	Brazil	7.55	7.50	7.58	7.56	x	x	7.58	
7	Jorge McFarlane	Peru	7.24	7.46	7.57	x	x	7.52	7.57	
8	Luis Rivera	Mexico	7.48	x	7.25	7.31	7.29	7.12	7.48	
9	Marcos Caldeira	Portugal	7.40	7.45	7.30				7.45	
10	Daniel Pineda	Chile	7.21	7.14	7.33				7.33	
11	Marcos Amalbert	Puerto Rico	6.82	7.10	7.12				7.12	
12	Maximiliano Díaz	Argentina	6.81	x	6.77				6.81	
13	Vicente Ríos	Mexico	6.79	6.52	6.76				6.79	

=== Triple jump ===
June 4

Rank	Athlete	Nationality	#1	#2	#3	#4	#5	#6	Result	Notes
1st place, gold medalist(s)	Alexis Copello	Cuba	17.28	–	–	–	–	–	17.28	CR
2nd place, silver medalist(s)	Yoandri Betanzos	Cuba	x	15.40	16.15	x	17.19	x	17.19	
3rd place, bronze medalist(s)	Jadel Gregório	Brazil	16.53	16.43	16.82	–	x	x	16.82	
4	Jefferson Sabino	Brazil	15.13	16.46	16.53	x	16.74	16.63	16.74	
5	Marcos Caldeira	Portugal	16.02	16.19	15.97	15.88	x	15.95	16.19	SB
6	Maximiliano Díaz	Argentina	14.92	15.45	15.60	15.12	15.50	x	15.60	
7	Jorge Gimeno	Spain	15.56	x	15.45	14.80	x	x	15.56	
8	Jair Cadenas	Mexico	x	x	15.29	x	–	x	15.29	
9	José Emilio Bellido	Spain	x	x	15.03				15.03	
10	Hugo Chila	Ecuador	x	13.61	–				13.61	

=== Shot put ===
June 4

Rank	Athlete	Nationality	#1	#2	#3	#4	#5	#6	Result	Notes
1st place, gold medalist(s)	Marco Fortes	Portugal	19.32	18.70	19.54	x	19.50	20.69	20.69	CR, NR
2nd place, silver medalist(s)	Germán Lauro	Argentina	18.25	18.52	20.43	x	20.05	x	20.43	PB
3rd place, bronze medalist(s)	Carlos Véliz	Cuba	19.11	20.20	19.96	20.04	20.18	20.13	20.20	SB
4	Borja Vivas	Spain	19.05	18.81	x	19.20	19.04	19.17	19.20	
5	Eder Moreno	Colombia	17.74	18.11	18.18	18.09	18.26	18.64	18.64	SB
6	Ronald Julião	Brazil	16.78	17.83	x	18.57	x	x	18.57	PB
7	António Vital e Silva	Portugal	17.60	18.25	x	x	x	x	18.25	
8	Mario Cota	Mexico	17.12	17.85	17.53	x	17.87	x	17.87	PB
9	Germán Millán	Spain	17.72	x	17.63				17.72	
10	Diego Osorio	Chile	16.73	16.59	17.50				17.50	PB
11	Maximiliano Alonso	Chile	17.36	17.35	16.84				17.36	
12	Javier Nieto	Peru	x	17.14	16.92				17.14	
13	Gustavo de Mendoça	Brazil	16.64	x	17.04				17.04	PB
14	Nicolas Martina	Argentina	16.94	x	16.97				16.97	
15	Aldo González	Bolivia	16.71	16.28	16.62				16.71	
	Carlos Martínez	Puerto Rico	x	x	x				NM	

=== Discus throw ===
June 5

Rank	Athlete	Nationality	#1	#2	#3	#4	#5	#6	Result	Notes
1st place, gold medalist(s)	Mario Pestano	Spain	62.32	63.01	62.31	x	x	62.16	63.01	
2nd place, silver medalist(s)	Frank Casañas	Spain	60.69	x	61.46	x	62.08	x	62.08	
3rd place, bronze medalist(s)	Jorge Fernández	Cuba	59.70	61.38	x	x	59.48	61.76	61.76	
4	Germán Lauro	Argentina	55.85	57.98	58.88	58.56	x	59.66	59.66	
5	Ronald Julião	Brazil	x	51.43	57.91	56.80	57.32	55.93	57.91	
6	Jorge Balliengo	Argentina	53.24	54.18	56.39	x	56.59	x	56.59	
7	Mario Cota	Mexico	54.77	54.35	x	54.75	55.35	x	55.35	
8	Jorge Grave	Portugal	x	54.28	53.07	x	x	53.39	54.28	
9	Jesús Parejo	Venezuela	53.40	53.18	52.32				53.40	
10	Maximiliano Alonso	Chile	53.26	x	52.72				53.26	
11	Gustavo de Mendoça	Brazil	49.90	51.68	51.57				51.68	SB
12	Alfredo Romero	Puerto Rico	50.78	50.75	48.97				50.78	
13	Rodolfo Casanova	Uruguay	45.93	46.08	x				46.08	
	Marco Fortes	Portugal							DNS	

=== Hammer throw ===
June 4

Rank	Athlete	Nationality	#1	#2	#3	#4	#5	#6	Result	Notes
1st place, gold medalist(s)	Roberto Janet	Cuba	73.33	73.76	x	70.80	70.80	73.82	73.82	
2nd place, silver medalist(s)	Juan Ignacio Cerra	Argentina	69.10	71.27	69.49	71.20	71.37	69.33	71.37	
3rd place, bronze medalist(s)	Wagner Domingos	Brazil	65.30	68.15	67.33	68.39	69.88	70.95	70.95	
4	Javier Cienfuegos	Spain	69.39	x	x	67.62	x	x	69.39	
5	Isaac Vicente	Spain	x	64.82	64.80	x	64.24	66.76	66.76	
6	Dário Manso	Portugal	x	65.90	64.21	x	65.11	65.47	65.90	
7	Pedro Muñoz	Venezuela	63.70	62.77	62.79	63.84	64.67	62.40	64.67	
8	Marcos dos Santos	Brazil	64.02	60.36	63.20	x	x	x	64.02	SB
9	Roberto Sáez	Chile	63.48	63.34	62.55				63.48	
10	Roberto Sawyers	Costa Rica	54.95	62.54	59.08				62.54	
11	Santiago de Jesús Loera	Mexico	60.87	60.51	60.39				60.87	
12	Jean Rosario	Puerto Rico	x	58.61	x				58.61	

=== Javelin throw ===
June 6

Rank	Athlete	Nationality	#1	#2	#3	#4	#5	#6	Result	Notes
1st place, gold medalist(s)	Guillermo Martínez	Cuba	81.71	79.49	–	–	–	–	81.71	CR
2nd place, silver medalist(s)	Víctor Fatecha	Paraguay	76.34	70.99	70.76	x	76.07	75.46	76.34	SB
3rd place, bronze medalist(s)	Dayron Márquez	Colombia	71.02	72.97	73.96	x	71.00	74.77	74.77	SB
4	Juan José Méndez	Mexico	71.49	72.24	71.63	x	74.17	66.46	74.17	
5	Rafael Baraza	Spain	x	70.66	73.02	74.16	70.42	x	74.16	
6	Luís Almeida	Portugal	71.28	x	x	x	x	68.42	71.28	
7	Luiz Fernando da Silva	Brazil	x	69.62	71.24	70.60	70.49	68.66	71.24	
8	José Lagunez	Mexico	62.64	67.80	64.68	63.38	x	x	67.80	
9	João Carlos Martins	Brazil	x	67.31	61.14				67.31	
10	Gustavo Dacal	Spain	67.13	x	67.06				67.13	
11	Felipe Ortiz	Puerto Rico	63.97	62.61	63.97				63.97	

=== Decathlon ===
June 4–5

The highest mark recorded in each event is highlighted in yellow

Rank	Athlete	Nationality	100m	LJ	SP	HJ	400m	110m H	DT	PV	JT	1500m	Points	Notes
1st place, gold medalist(s)	Luiz Alberto de Araújo	Brazil	11.08	7.33	14.48	1.91	49.37	14.44	44.17	4.60	51.71	4:39.53	7816	PB
2nd place, silver medalist(s)	Agustín Félix	Spain	11.68	7.26	13.58	2.03	52.70	15.03	39.85	4.80	52.86	4:55.10	7395	
3rd place, bronze medalist(s)	Román Gastaldi	Argentina	11.30	7.04	14.57	1.91	50.62	15.78	42.68	4.20	50.82	4:45.08	7290	
4	Alexis Chivás	Cuba	11.20	7.49	15.27	1.85	52.00	14.42	46.16	NM	58.87	4:55.11	6971	
5	Pedro Santos	Portugal	11.66	7.13	10.27	1.88	49.94	15.19	34.10	3.90	48.59	4:32.60	6838	
6	Fernando Korniejczuk	Argentina	11.82	6.64	12.14	1.88	53.56	16.36	35.68	4.30	47.14	5:14.61	6382	
7	Jhonatan Davis	Venezuela	11.41	6.66	12.28	1.82	DQ	14.64	39.37	3.50	58.69	5:26.97	5932	
	Marcos Sánchez-Valle	Puerto Rico	11.25	6.51	14.82	1.91	DQ	15.67	39.30	4.30	53.87	DNS	DNF	
	Willian Valor	Venezuela	DQ	6.58	12.50	1.82	51.56	15.54	39.90	4.00	56.32	DNS	DNF	
	Carlos Eduardo Chinin	Brazil	DNS	–	–	–	–	–	–	–	–	–	DNS	

== Women's results ==
=== 100 meters ===
Heats – June 4
Wind:
Heat 1: +0.1 m/s, Heat 2: +0.8 m/s

Rank	Heat	Name	Nationality	Time	Notes
1	2	Ana Cláudia Lemos Silva	Brazil	11.42	Q
2	2	Digna Luz Murillo	Spain	11.54	Q
3	2	Carol Rodríguez	Puerto Rico	11.56	Q
4	1	María Idrobo	Colombia	11.71	Q
5	2	Yomara Hinestroza	Colombia	11.73	q
6	2	Sonia Tavares	Portugal	11.74	q
7	1	Erika Rivera	Puerto Rico	11.81	Q
8	1	Thaissa Presti	Brazil	11.91	Q
9	1	Amparo María Cotán	Spain	11.92	
10	1	Gloria Diogo	São Tomé and Príncipe	12.06	
11	1	Carla Tavares	Portugal	21.56	
	2	Alice Có	Guinea-Bissau	DQ	FS1

Final – June 4
Wind:
+0.1 m/s

Rank	Lane	Name	Nationality	Time	Notes
1st place, gold medalist(s)	5	Ana Cláudia Lemos Silva	Brazil	11.38	
2nd place, silver medalist(s)	3	Erika Rivera	Puerto Rico	11.45	
3rd place, bronze medalist(s)	4	Digna Luz Murillo	Spain	11.49	
4	7	Carol Rodríguez	Puerto Rico	11.57	
5	2	Yomara Hinestroza	Colombia	11.65	
6	6	María Idrobo	Colombia	11.74	
7	1	Sonia Tavares	Portugal	11.74	
8	8	Thaissa Presti	Brazil	11.80	

Extra – June 4
Wind:
+0.6 m/s

Rank	Lane	Name	Nationality	Time	Notes
1	5	Celiangeli Morales	Puerto Rico	11.70	
2	6	Bárbara Leôncio	Brazil	11.78	
3	4	Beatriz Cruz	Puerto Rico	11.79	
	3	Kauiza Venâncio	Brazil	DNS	

=== 200 meters ===
Heats – June 5
Wind:
Heat 1: -1.1 m/s, Heat 2: -1.5 m/s

Rank	Heat	Name	Nationality	Time	Notes
1	1	Ana Cláudia Lemos Silva	Brazil	23.31	Q
2	2	Roxana Díaz	Cuba	23.50	Q
3	1	Erika Rivera	Puerto Rico	23.72	Q
4	2	Carol Rodríguez	Puerto Rico	23.86	Q
5	1	Erika Chávez	Ecuador	23.87	Q
6	2	Thaissa Presti	Brazil	23.99	Q
7	1	Sonia Tavares	Portugal	24.20	q, SB
8	1	Darlenys Obregón	Colombia	24.25	q
9	1	Estela García	Spain	24.51	
9	2	Ugundi Quiawacana	Portugal	24.51	PB
11	2	Belén Recio	Spain	24.67	
12	2	Natalia Santamaria	El Salvador	26.10	
13	2	Alice Có	Guinea-Bissau	28.29	

Final – June 6
Wind:
+0.5 m/s

Rank	Lane	Name	Nationality	Time	Notes
1st place, gold medalist(s)	5	Erika Rivera	Puerto Rico	23.18	
2nd place, silver medalist(s)	4	Roxana Díaz	Cuba	23.25	
3rd place, bronze medalist(s)	3	Carol Rodríguez	Puerto Rico	23.54	
4	8	Thaissa Presti	Brazil	23.90	
5	7	Erika Chávez	Ecuador	23.95	
6	2	Darlenys Obregón	Colombia	24.22	
7	1	Sonia Tavares	Portugal	24.37	
	6	Ana Cláudia Lemos Silva	Brazil	DNS	

=== 400 meters ===
Heats – June 4

Rank	Heat	Name	Nationality	Time	Notes
1	2	Daisurami Bonne	Cuba	52.92	Q
2	1	Yenifer Padilla	Colombia	53.43	Q
3	1	Bárbara de Oliveira	Brazil	53.49	Q
4	2	Jailma de Lima	Brazil	54.30	Q
5	1	Wilmary Álvarez	Venezuela	54.34	Q
6	2	Nallely Vela	Mexico	54.53	Q
7	1	Teresa Torres	Spain	55.22	q
8	2	Vera Barbosa	Portugal	55.33	q
9	1	Catia Nunes	Portugal	55.70	SB
10	2	Sharolyn Scott	Costa Rica	55.83	
11	2	Aauri Bokesa	Spain	56.05	
	1	Susana Clement	Cuba	DQ	IAAF 163.3b

Final – June 5

Rank	Lane	Name	Nationality	Time	Notes
1st place, gold medalist(s)	6	Daisurami Bonne	Cuba	52.25	SB
2nd place, silver medalist(s)	4	Yenifer Padilla	Colombia	52.68	
3rd place, bronze medalist(s)	3	Jailma de Lima	Brazil	52.86	
4	5	Bárbara de Oliveira	Brazil	53.57	
5	8	Wilmary Álvarez	Venezuela	53.88	SB
6	7	Nallely Vela	Mexico	54.03	
7	1	Vera Barbosa	Portugal	55.50	
8	2	Teresa Torres	Spain	55.66	

Extra – June 4

Rank	Lane	Name	Nationality	Time	Notes
1	6	Aline dos Santos	Brazil	53.89	
2	3	Begoña Garrido	Spain	54.89	
3	5	Natalia Romero	Spain	55.04	
	4	Perla Regina dos Santos	Brazil	DNS	

=== 800 meters ===
Heats – June 4

Rank	Heat	Name	Nationality	Time	Notes
1	1	Élian Périz	Spain	2:04.60	Q
2	1	Rosemary Almanza	Cuba	2:04.71	Q
3	1	Andrea Ferris	Panama	2:04.72	Q
4	1	Muriel Coneo	Colombia	2:04.87	q
5	2	Christiane dos Santos	Brazil	2:05.57	Q
6	2	Indira Terrero	Cuba	2:05.61	Q
7	2	Gabriela Medina	Mexico	2:06.32	Q, SB
8	1	Leonor Odete	Mozambique	2:06.39	q, SB
9	2	Sandra Teixeira	Portugal	2:06.42	
10	2	Isabel Macías	Spain	2:06.61	
11	2	Daisy Ugarte	Bolivia	2:06.96	SB
12	1	Perla Regina dos Santos	Brazil	2:07.74	
13	1	Neide Dias	Angola	2:13.63	

Final – June 6

Rank	Name	Nationality	Time	Notes
1st place, gold medalist(s)	Andrea Ferris	Panama	2:02.86	
2nd place, silver medalist(s)	Rosemary Almanza	Cuba	2:03.03	PB
3rd place, bronze medalist(s)	Indira Terrero	Cuba	2:03.24	SB
4	Élian Périz	Spain	2:04.25	
5	Christiane dos Santos	Brazil	2:04.25	
6	Muriel Coneo	Colombia	2:05.36	
7	Gabriela Medina	Mexico	2:05.50	SB
8	Leonor Odete	Mozambique	2:07.88	

=== 1500 meters ===
June 5

Rank	Name	Nationality	Time	Notes
1st place, gold medalist(s)	Nuria Fernández	Spain	4:05.71	CR
2nd place, silver medalist(s)	Juliana Paula dos Santos	Brazil	4:07.30	NR
3rd place, bronze medalist(s)	Jessica Augusto	Portugal	4:08.32	
4	Adriana Muñoz	Cuba	4:15.21	
5	Zenaide Vieira	Brazil	4:15.32	
6	Isabel Macías	Spain	4:18.33	SB
7	Sandra Amarillo	Argentina	4:21.36	PB
8	Anayeli Navarro	Mexico	4:21.64	PB
9	Daniela Cunha	Portugal	4:23.90	SB
10	Gladys Landaverde	El Salvador	4:28.19	
11	Liliani Méndez	Puerto Rico	4:29.53	
12	Rocío Huillca	Peru	4:33.49	SB
13	Valeria Rodríguez	Argentina	4:37.34	

=== 3000 meters ===
June 6

Rank	Name	Nationality	Time	Notes
1st place, gold medalist(s)	Jessica Augusto	Portugal	8:46.59	CR
2nd place, silver medalist(s)	Iris Fuentes-Pila	Spain	9:06.24	PB
3rd place, bronze medalist(s)	Diana Martín	Spain	9:06.53	PB
4	Simone da Silva	Brazil	9:09.41	
5	Rosa Godoy	Argentina	9:10.24	SB
6	Zenaide Vieira	Brazil	9:14.57	PB
7	Nadia Rodríguez	Argentina	9:18.18	PB
8	Carla Salomé Rocha	Portugal	9:19.46	PB
9	Adriana Muñoz	Cuba	9:34.64	
10	Yoni Ninahuaman	Peru	9:39.81	
	Daniela Cunha*	Portugal	9:36.54	PB
	Rocío Huillca	Peru	DNS	

=== 5000 meters ===
June 5

Rank	Name	Nationality	Time	Notes
1st place, gold medalist(s)	Judith Plá	Spain	15:43.20	
2nd place, silver medalist(s)	Simone da Silva	Brazil	15:49.79	PB
3rd place, bronze medalist(s)	Yolanda Caballero	Colombia	15:50.18	PB
4	Rosa Godoy	Argentina	15:53.76	PB
5	Paula González	Spain	16:19.97	
6	Nadia Rodríguez	Argentina	16:24.91	PB
7	Yoni Ninahuaman	Peru	16:36.47	
8	Rosa Chacha	Ecuador	16:39.16	SB
9	María Ferris	Panama	17:47.47	
	Silvia Felipo	Andorra	DNF	

=== 100 meters hurdles ===
Heats – June 5
Wind:
Heat 1: -0.6 m/s, Heat 2: -0.6 m/s, Heat 3: -0.1 m/s

Rank	Heat	Name	Nationality	Time	Notes
1	1	Anay Tejeda	Cuba	13.02	Q, CR
2	3	Brigitte Merlano	Colombia	13.34	Q
3	2	Belkis Milanes	Cuba	13.39	Q
4	1	Shantia Moss	Dominican Republic	13.40	Q
5	3	Ana Torrijos	Spain	13.52	Q, PB
6	3	Francisca Guzmán	Chile	13.61	q
6	2	Eliecit Palacios	Colombia	13.61	Q
8	1	Giselle Marculino	Brazil	13.73	q
9	2	Maíla Machado	Brazil	13.74	
10	1	Eva Vital	Portugal	13.81	
11	1	Marta Miro	Spain	14.07	SB
12	3	Monica Lopes	Portugal	14.18	
13	2	Violeta Avila	Mexico	14.49	
	1	Jeimmy Bernardez	Honduras	DQ	FS1
	3	Giuliana Franciosi	Peru	DQ	FS1
	2	Soledad Donzino	Argentina	DNS	
	2	Leocabela Quaresma	São Tomé and Príncipe	DNS	

Final – June 6
Wind:
+0.5 m/s

Rank	Lane	Name	Nationality	Time	Notes
1st place, gold medalist(s)	6	Anay Tejeda	Cuba	12.84	CR
2nd place, silver medalist(s)	3	Brigitte Merlano	Colombia	13.10	SB
3rd place, bronze medalist(s)	5	Shantia Moss	Dominican Republic	13.25	SB
4	7	Eliecit Palacios	Colombia	13.42	PB
5	8	Ana Torrijos	Spain	13.45	PB
6	1	Giselle Marculino	Brazil	13.78	
7	4	Belkis Milanes	Cuba	13.80	
8	2	Francisca Guzmán	Chile	13.85	

=== 400 meters hurdles ===
Heats – June 4

Rank	Heat	Name	Nationality	Time	Notes
1	1	Zudikey Rodríguez	Mexico	57.61	Q
2	2	Patrícia Lopes	Portugal	58.23	Q
3	2	Laia Forcadell	Spain	58.39	Q, SB
4	2	Karla Dueñas	Mexico	59.03	Q, SB
5	2	Lucy Jaramillo	Ecuador	59.07	q
6	1	Kathyenid Rivera	Puerto Rico	59.19	Q
7	1	Liliane Fernandes	Brazil	59.20	Q
8	1	Laura Sotomayor	Spain	59.38	q
9	2	Ana Paula Pereira	Brazil	1:00.19	SB
10	1	Deborah Rodríguez	Uruguay	1:00.96	

Final – June 5

Rank	Lane	Name	Nationality	Time	Notes
1st place, gold medalist(s)	3	Zudikey Rodríguez	Mexico	56.33	
2nd place, silver medalist(s)	6	Patrícia Lopes	Portugal	57.50	
3rd place, bronze medalist(s)	4	Laia Forcadell	Spain	57.73	SB
4	5	Kathyenid Rivera	Puerto Rico	58.89	
5	7	Karla Dueñas	Mexico	59.43	
6	8	Liliane Fernandes	Brazil	59.46	
7	1	Laura Sotomayor	Spain	59.67	
8	2	Lucy Jaramillo	Ecuador	1:00.35	

=== 3000 meters steeplechase ===
June 4

Rank	Name	Nationality	Time	Notes
1st place, gold medalist(s)	Rosa Morató	Spain	9:40.26	RC
2nd place, silver medalist(s)	Zulema Fuentes-Pila	Spain	9:53.75	SB
3rd place, bronze medalist(s)	Sabine Heitling	Brazil	9:56.02	
4	Carla Salomé Rocha	Portugal	10:02.02	PB
5	Ángela Figueroa	Colombia	10:11.77	
6	Rocío Huillca	Peru	10:25.42	PB
7	Yoni Ninahuaman	Peru	10:50.16	

=== 4 x 100 meters relay ===
June 5

Rank	Lane	Nation	Competitors	Time	Notes
1st place, gold medalist(s)	6	Brazil	Ana Cláudia Lemos Silva, Vanda Gomes, Thaissa Presti, Bárbara Leôncio	43.97	
2nd place, silver medalist(s)	5	Colombia	Eliecit Palacios, María Idrobo, Darlenys Obregón, Yomara Hinestroza	44.29	
3rd place, bronze medalist(s)	4	Spain	Ana Torrijos, Digna Luz Murillo, Estela García, Amparo Cotán	44.38	
	3	Puerto Rico	Carol Rodríguez, Erika Rivera, Beatriz Cruz, Celiangeli Morales	DQ	IAAF 170.13
	7	Portugal	Eva Vital, Ugundi Quiawacana, Carla Tavares, Sonia Tavares	DNS	

=== 4 x 400 meters relay ===
June 6

Rank	Nation	Competitors	Time	Notes
1st place, gold medalist(s)	Cuba	Roxana Díaz, Indira Terrero, Susana Clement, Daisurami Bonne	3:30.73	
2nd place, silver medalist(s)	Mexico	Karla Dueñas, Nallely Vela, Gabriela Medina, Zudikey Rodríguez	3:32.96	
3rd place, bronze medalist(s)	Brazil	Sheila Ferreira, Bárbara de Oliveira, Aline dos Santos, Jailma de Lima	3:33.17	
4	Spain	Aauri Bokesa, Natalia Romero, Begoña Garrido, Teresa Torres	3:37.49	
5	Colombia	María Idrobo, Muriel Coneo, Darlenys Obregón, Yenifer Padilla	3:38.94	
6	Portugal	Catia Nunes, Joceline Monteiro, Patricia Lopes, Vera Barbosa	3:39.37	
	Puerto Rico	Beatriz Cruz, Carol Rodríguez, Kathyenid Rivera, Erika Rivera	DQ	

=== 10,000 meters walk ===
June 4

Rank	Name	Nationality	Time	Notes
1st place, gold medalist(s)	Ana Cabecinha	Portugal	43:31.21	RC
2nd place, silver medalist(s)	Julia Takacs	Spain	43:35.50	
3rd place, bronze medalist(s)	Ines Henriques	Portugal	44:31.27	
4	Lorena Luaces	Spain	45:54.03	
5	Milangela Rosales	Venezuela	46:40.22	
6	Arabelly Orjuela	Colombia	47:34.21	
7	Cisiane Lopes	Brazil	48:49.19	
	Tania de Oliveira	Brazil	DNF	
	Verónica Colindres	El Salvador	DQ	

=== High jump ===
June 6

Rank	Athlete	Nationality	1.65	1.70	1.75	1.80	1.83	1.86	1.89	1.95	Result	Notes
1st place, gold medalist(s)	Ruth Beitia	Spain	–	–	–	–	o	–	xxo	xxx	1.89	
2nd place, silver medalist(s)	Lesyaní Mayor	Cuba	–	o	o	o	o	xxo	xxx		1.86	
3rd place, bronze medalist(s)	Romary Rifka	Mexico	–	o	o	o	o	xxx			1.83	
4	Gema Martín-Pouzelo	Spain	–	o	o	o	xo	xxx			1.83	
5	Paola Fuentes	Mexico	–	o	o	o	xxx				1.80	
5	Valdileia Martins	Brazil	–	o	o	o	xxx				1.80	
5	Betsabé Páez	Argentina	o	o	o	o	xxx				1.80	PB
8	Monica de Freitas	Brazil	–	xo	o	o	xxx				1.80	
9	Gabriela Saravia	Peru	xxo	xxx							1.65	

=== Pole vault ===
June 4

Rank	Athlete	Nationality	3.40	3.60	3.70	3.80	3.90	4.00	4.10	4.20	4.30	4.40	4.50	4.65	4.76	4.85	4.93	Result	Notes
1st place, gold medalist(s)	Fabiana Murer	Brazil	–	–	–	–	–	–	–	–	–	–	o	o	o	xxo	xxx	4.85	AR
2nd place, silver medalist(s)	Ana Pinero	Spain	–	–	–	o	–	o	–	xo	o	xxx						4.30	PB
2nd place, silver medalist(s)	Karla da Silva	Brazil	–	–	–	–	–	–	o	xo	o	xxx						4.30	SB
4	Naroa Agirre	Spain	–	–	–	–	o	–	xo	xo	xxx							4.20	
5	Alejandra García	Argentina	–	–	–	–	–	xo	o	xxx								4.10	
6	Daniela Inchausti	Argentina	–	o	o	xo	o	xxx										3.90	
7	Keisa Monterola	Venezuela	–	–	–	xo	xo	xxx										3.90	
8	Déborah Gyurcsek	Uruguay	o	o	xxx													3.60	
8	Andrea Zambrana	Puerto Rico	–	o	–	xxx												3.60	
10	Cecilia Villar	Mexico	xo	xo	xxx													3.60	

=== Long jump ===
June 4

Rank	Athlete	Nationality	#1	#2	#3	#4	#5	#6	Result	Notes
1st place, gold medalist(s)	Concepción Montaner	Spain	5.93	6.45	6.35	6.37	6.36	6.31	6.45	SB
2nd place, silver medalist(s)	Vanessa Seles	Brazil	5.83	6.24	6.29	6.18	6.10	5.85	6.29	SB
3rd place, bronze medalist(s)	Eliane Martins	Brazil	x	5.71	6.17	x	6.06	x	6.17	
4	Petra Mun Brekke	Spain	5.96	6.09	x	x	5.75	6.03	6.09	
5	Munich Tovar	Venezuela	5.82	x	6.01	5.63	5.55	5.56	6.01	
6	Andrea Morales	Argentina	x	5.79	5.60	5.58	x	5.42	5.79	
7	Aide Villareal	Mexico	5.55	5.49	5.60	5.69	x	5.28	5.69	

=== Triple jump ===
June 5

Rank	Athlete	Nationality	#1	#2	#3	#4	#5	#6	Result	Notes
1st place, gold medalist(s)	Yargelis Savigne	Cuba	14.25	14.41	x	11.97	14.62	x	14.62	CR
2nd place, silver medalist(s)	Caterine Ibargüen	Colombia	13.81	x	x	14.29	13.79	13.82	14.29	PB
3rd place, bronze medalist(s)	Patricia Sarrapio	Spain	13.70	x	13.56	13.85	14.10	13.69	14.10	PB
4	Gisele de Oliveira	Brazil	13.66	13.45	x	13.83	x	11.82	13.83	SB
5	Tania da Silva	Brazil	13.30	x	13.19	13.19	x	12.99	13.30	
6	Maitane Azpeitia	Spain	13.10	x	x	13.25	x	x	13.25	PB
7	Munich Tovar	Venezuela	12.71	x	12.55	12.77	12.98	12.98	12.98	
8	Aide Villareal	Mexico	12.55	12.93	12.88	12.79	12.82	x	12.93	
9	Leocabela Quaresma	São Tomé and Príncipe	x	12.44	12.59				12.59	

=== Shot put ===
June 5

Rank	Athlete	Nationality	#1	#2	#3	#4	#5	#6	Result	Notes
1st place, gold medalist(s)	Misleydis González	Cuba	18.09	18.32	18.38	18.34	18.21	18.52	18.52	
2nd place, silver medalist(s)	Natalia Ducó	Chile	16.98	16.85	17.10	x	x	16.99	17.10	
3rd place, bronze medalist(s)	Ursula Ruiz	Spain	15.80	16.56	x	x	16.97	x	16.97	PB
4	Geisa Arcanjo	Brazil	x	14.87	x	15.90	x	16.10	16.10	
5	Magnolia Iglesias	Spain	15.12	15.17	x	15.36	x	15.54	15.54	
6	Ahymara Espinoza	Venezuela	15.11	x	15.43	14.91	x	14.57	15.43	
7	Antonia Borges	Portugal	14.47	15.14	x	15.17	15.31	x	15.31	
8	Sónia Borges	Cape Verde	12.16	11.90	12.45	12.54	12.37	12.78	12.78	
	Keelly Medeiros	Brazil							DNS	

=== Discus throw ===
June 6

Rank	Athlete	Nationality	#1	#2	#3	#4	#5	#6	Result	Notes
1st place, gold medalist(s)	Misleydis González	Cuba	x	52.04	49.75	x	x	60.23	60.23	
2nd place, silver medalist(s)	Yarelis Barrios	Cuba	x	x	59.96	x	x	x	59.96	
3rd place, bronze medalist(s)	Elisângela Adriano	Brazil	56.72	x	x	58.86	56.58	x	58.86	SB
4	Karen Gallardo	Chile	54.30	49.50	x	x	51.78	x	54.30	
5	Andressa de Morais	Brazil	52.50	54.20	52.25	53.55	53.15	x	54.20	
6	Irina Rodrigues	Portugal	52.44	51.00	51.55	x	51.12	53.58	53.58	
7	María Cubillán	Venezuela	x	52.39	51.18	48.94	x	50.46	52.39	
8	Liliana Cá	Portugal	x	51.91	x	x	x	x	51.91	
9	Irache Quintanal	Spain	51.53	49.79	45.90				51.53	
10	Paulina Flores	Mexico	44.38	47.97	50.37				50.37	PB
11	Mercedes de Sántalo	Spain	49.14	49.29	48.83				49.29	
12	Rocío Comba	Argentina	x	47.98	48.66				48.66	
13	Sónia Borges	Cape Verde	41.65	43.79	43.16				43.79	
	Irais Estrada	Mexico	x	x	x				NM	
	Aixa Middleton	Panama	x	x	x				NM	

=== Hammer throw ===
June 4

Rank	Athlete	Nationality	#1	#2	#3	#4	#5	#6	Result	Notes
1st place, gold medalist(s)	Jennifer Dahlgren	Argentina	x	68.47	69.60	70.91	70.05	x	70.91	
2nd place, silver medalist(s)	Berta Castells	Spain	68.37	68.36	67.81	67.63	x	66.32	68.37	
3rd place, bronze medalist(s)	Rosa Rodríguez	Venezuela	65.84	64.19	x	65.25	x	67.58	67.58	SB
4	Laura Redondo	Spain	62.33	63.38	x	59.57	60.71	61.85	63.38	
5	Vânia Silva	Portugal	x	58.28	63.05	x	x	63.05	63.05	
6	Odette Palma	Chile	60.49	x	x	x	x	58.13	60.49	
7	Josiane Soares	Brazil	x	57.90	60.40	x	x	x	60.40	
8	Ana Paula Pereira	Brazil	57.96	56.92	58.92	53.42	58.23	56.85	58.92	
9	Reyna Campoy	Mexico	x	x	51.64				51.64	
10	Mafuta Maketa	Angola	49.09	x	46.71				49.09	PB
11	Paola Miranda	Paraguay	x	x	44.36				44.36	
	Sharon Ayala	Mexico	x	x	x				NM	
	Yipsi Moreno	Cuba	x	x	x				NM	

=== Javelin throw ===
June 5

Rank	Athlete	Nationality	#1	#2	#3	#4	#5	#6	Result	Notes
1st place, gold medalist(s)	Mercedes Chilla	Spain	x	58.92	62.39	58.41	x	58.74	62.39	SB
2nd place, silver medalist(s)	Silvia Cruz	Portugal	50.87	53.43	52.46	51.11	x	53.35	53.43	SB
3rd place, bronze medalist(s)	Nuria Ferrer	Spain	51.29	51.90	44.88	50.75	45.69	–	51.90	
4	Romina Maggi	Argentina	50.81	49.14	50.25	x	49.64	50.15	50.81	
5	Rafela Gonçalves	Brazil	45.94	49.85	49.87	49.45	50.28	47.78	50.28	SB
6	Katryna Cabrera	Paraguay	42.84	47.32	x	48.69	47.14	50.06	50.06	

=== Heptathlon ===
June 4–5

The highest mark recorded in each event is highlighted in yellow

Rank	Athlete	Nationality	100m H	HJ	SP	200m	LJ	JT	800m	Points	Notes
1st place, gold medalist(s)	Soledad Donzino	Argentina	13.89	1.72	10.49	25.18	6.05	38.95	2:34.14	5459	PB
2nd place, silver medalist(s)	Estefania Fortes	Spain	14.21	1.57	12.61	25.09	5.68	39.57	2:24.56	5406	PB
3rd place, bronze medalist(s)	Bárbara Hernando	Spain	14.35	1.66	11.58	26.48	5.45	37.61	2:15.75	5314	SB
4	Vanessa Spinola	Brazil	14.85	1.69	12.11	24.89	5.40	32.68	2:19.01	5304	
5	Melry Caldeira	Brazil	14.81	1.60	12.48	26.20	5.65	32.15	2:23.51	5113	
6	Catarina Costa	Portugal	15.02	1.72	9.64	25.02	5.23	29.79	2:14.63	5103	PB
7	Thaimara Rivas	Venezuela	15.52	1.54	11.69	27.46	5.13	37.60	2:32.68	4631	
8	Bibiana Olama	Equatorial Guinea	16.99	1.48	10.76	28.91	4.47	30.83	2:37.10	3857	PB
9	Maria Inaly Morazán	Nicaragua	16.47	1.45	7.93	27.36	4.96	21.65	2:36.66	3781	
	Ana Capdevila*	Spain	14.65	1.63	10.93	25.61	5.74	33.76	2:19.58	5230	
	Laura Ginés*	Spain	14.70	1.69	12.12	25.86	5.12	35.68	2:26.19	5120	SB
	Yaritza Rivera	Puerto Rico	14.36	1.63	11.38	25.94	4.67	NM	DNS	DNF	
	Gillerci González	Venezuela	14.86	NM	10.40	1:05.53	5.51	29.03	DNS	DNF	
	Gretchen Quintana	Cuba	DNF	DNS	–	–	–	–	–	DNF	
