= Ailson Feitosa =

Brazilian sprinter (born 1988)

Aílson Feitosa
Personal information
- Born: Aílson da Silva Feitosa; 13 August 1988 (age 37) Sítio Novo do Tocantins, Tocantins, Brazil
- Height: 1.76 m (5 ft 9 in)
- Weight: 74 kg (163 lb)
Medal record
Men's athletics
Representing Brazil
Pan American Games
Gold medal – first place	2011 Guadalajara	4×100 m relay
Military World Games
Gold medal – first place	2011 Rio de Janeiro	4×100 m relay
South American Championships
Gold medal – first place	2011 Buenos Aires	4×100 m relay
- Updated on 12 April 2014

Aílson da Silva Feitosa (born 13 August 1988) is a Brazilian track and field athlete who competes in the sprints, specialising in the 200 metres. He is a frequent member of the Brazilian 4×100 metres relay team and won three gold medals for his country in 2011, taking titles at the South American Championships in Athletics, Military World Games and Pan American Games.

Born in Sítio Novo do Tocantins, he began competing at national level in 2005 and won a number of medals in the 100 metres and 200 metres in the youth, junior and under-23 sections of the Brazilian championships. He represents the BM&F Bovespa club. Feitosa made his first international appearances in 2007: at the South American Junior Championships he was fourth in the 200 m and led off the Brazilian team to the 4×100 metres relay silver medal. He was also part of the relay team at the 2007 Pan American Junior Athletics Championships where Brazil finished fourth. In 2008 he broke the 21-second mark for the 200 m, running a time of 20.96 seconds. The following year he improved his 100 m best to 10.32 seconds at the São Paulo regionals.

The 2011 season saw Feitosa win a series of gold medals. In June he placed sixth in the individual 200 m at the 2011 South American Championships in Athletics before going on to win the 4 × 100 m relay title for Brazil. The 2011 Military World Games were held in Rio de Janeiro a month later and he won the relay title with a team of Vicente de Lima, Basílio Morais Junior and Nilson André. He also came sixth in the 200 m final. The 2011 Pan American Games was Feitosa's third international selection for the Brazilian relay squad that year and he led off the team including Sandro Viana, Nilson André and Bruno de Barros which went on to equal the Pan American Games record time of 38.18 seconds for the event.

== Personal bests ==
- 100 m: 10.30 (wind: +2.0 m/s) – São Paulo, Brazil, 5 April 2014
- 100 m (wind assisted): 10.19 w (wind: +2.1 m/s) – Campinas, Brazil, 4 May 2013
- 200 m: 20.62 (wind: +1.7 m/s) – São Paulo, Brazil, 12 May 2012
- 400 m: 46.79 – São Paulo, Brazil, 22 February 2014

== Achievements ==
Year	Competition	Venue	Position	Event	Notes
Representing Brazil
2007	South American Junior Championships	São Paulo, Brazil	4th	200 m	21.69 (wind: -0.2 m/s)
2007	South American Junior Championships	São Paulo, Brazil	2nd	4 × 100 m relay	40.66
2007	Pan American Junior Championships	São Paulo, Brazil	5th (h)	200 m	21.41 (wind: +0.0 m/s)
2007	Pan American Junior Championships	São Paulo, Brazil	4th	4 × 100 m relay	40.64
2008	South American U-23 Championships	Lima, Peru	1st	4 × 100 m relay	40.06
2010	Ibero-American Championships	San Fernando, Spain	–	4 × 100 m relay	DQ
2011	South American Championships	Buenos Aires, Argentina	6th	200 m	22.07 (wind: +1.7 m/s)
2011	South American Championships	Buenos Aires, Argentina	1st	4 × 100 m relay	39.87
2011	Military World Games	Rio de Janeiro, Brazil	6th	200 m	21.26 (wind: +1.2 m/s)
2011	Military World Games	Rio de Janeiro, Brazil	1st	4 × 100 m relay	39.53
2011	Pan American Games	Guadalajara, Mexico	1st	4 × 100 m relay	38.18 A
2014	South American Games	Santiago, Chile	1st	4 × 100 m relay	38.90
2014	South American Games	Santiago, Chile	1st	4 × 400 m relay	3:03.94
2016	Ibero-American Championships	Rio de Janeiro, Brazil	2nd	4 × 100 m relay	38.65
