= 2011 South American Championships in Athletics =

47th South American Championships
- Dates: 2–5 June
- Host city: Buenos Aires, Argentina
- Venue: CeNARD
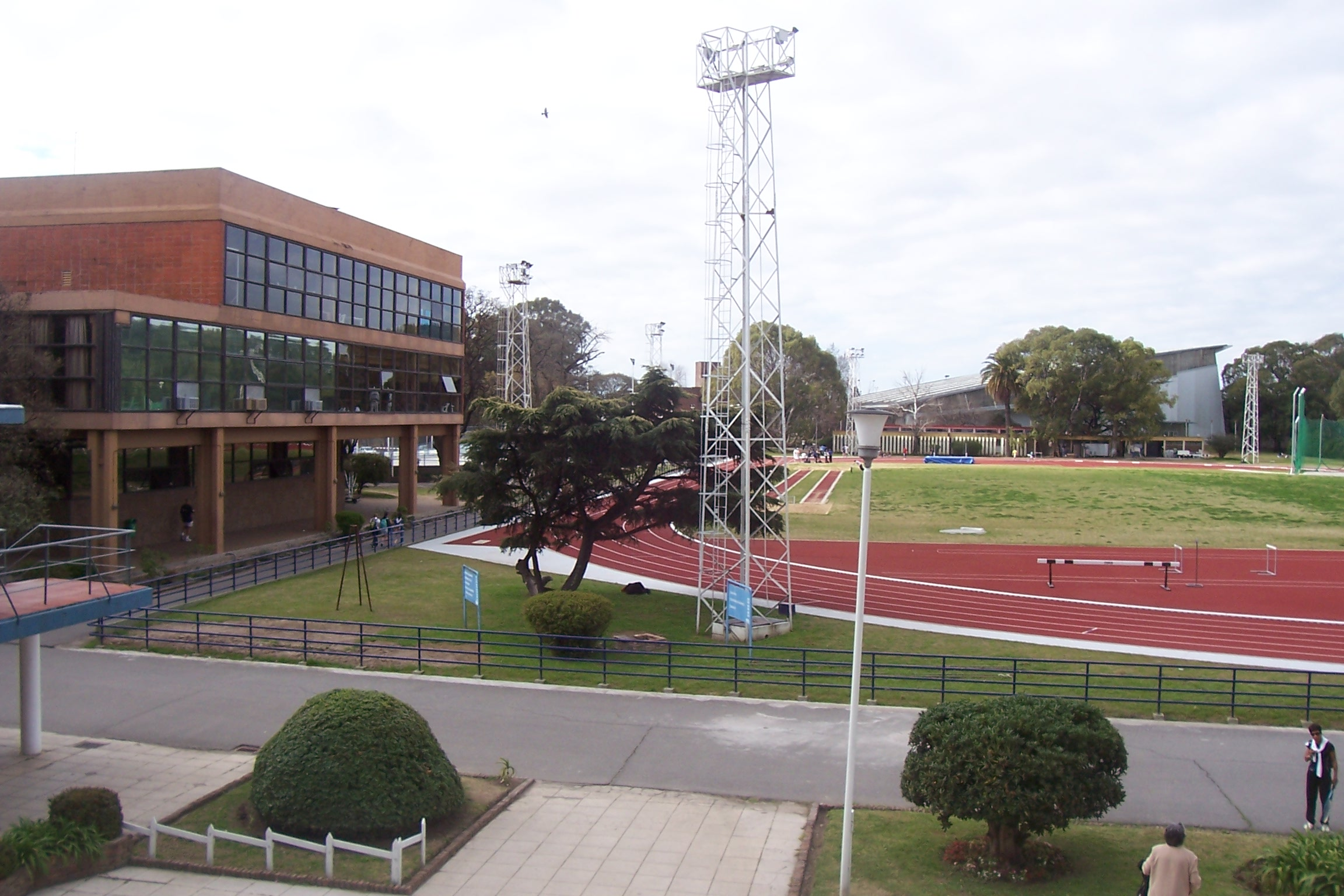
- Level: Senior
- Type: Outdoor
- Events: 44 (men: 22; women: 22)
- Participation: 345 athletes from 13 nations

The 2011 South American Championships in Athletics were the 47th edition of the South American Championships, organised under the supervision of the CONSUDATLE. They were held at the National Center of High Performance Athletics (Centro Nacional de Alto Rendimiento Deportivo, CeNARD) in Buenos Aires, Argentina from 2 to 5 June 2011. Forty-four track and field events were contested, with the number of contests split evenly between the sexes. A total of 345 athletes participated at the championships.

It was the first time since 1967 that the city had hosted the event. Brazil continued its dominance at the continental competition, winning the most medals of the fourteen participating countries (51 in total, 21 of them gold). It also retained both the men's and women's title on points. Colombia was the next most successful nation, taking twelve gold medals and thirty-three overall, while the host nation Argentina came third with five golds and twenty medals altogether.

In the events, two South American records were set in the men's and women's 20,000 m track walk competition. Although cold weather conditions affected performances, a total of eight Championships records were improved over the course of the four-day competition, which also saw ten national records beaten.

On the first day, Brazil's Fabiana Murer won the women's pole vault in a championship record, while Argentine Jennifer Dahlgren achieved the same feat in the women's shot put. Reigning Olympic champion Maurren Maggi won her sixth title in the long jump. On day two Juan Ignacio Cerra won his ninth hammer throw gold medal in the history of the event, while Luiz Alberto de Araújo made his breakthrough in the men's decathlon – a championship record of 7944 points made him the fourth best South American of all time.

The women's track events on day three saw Ana Cláudia Silva complete a sprint double over 100 and 200 metres. Rosibel García did the middle-distance equivalent, taking the titles over 800 and 1500 metres. On the final day, Simone da Silva of Brazil won the women's 10,000 metres in 31:59.11 minutes, making her the second fastest South American runner over the distance.

== Records ==
Event	Name	Country	Record	Type
20000 m walk (track)	Andrés Chocho	Ecuador	1:20:23.8	AR, NR
20000 m walk (track)	Gustavo Restrepo	Colombia	1:20:36.6	NR
20000 m walk (track)	Yerko Araya	Chile	1:20:47.2	NR
20000 m walk (track)	Caio Bonfim	Brazil	1:20:58.5	NR
20000 m walk (track)	Juan Manuel Cano	Argentina	1:23:09.0	NR
20000 m walk (track)	Ronald Quispe	Bolivia	1:25:59.2	NR
20000 m walk (track)	Ingrid Hernández	Colombia	1:32:09.4	AR, NR
20000 m walk (track)	Milángela Rosales	Venezuela	1:32:17.6	NR
Triple jump	Maximiliano Díaz	Argentina	16.51 m	NR
Discus throw	Ronald Julião	Brazil	62.72 m	CR
Decathlon	Luiz Alberto de Araújo	Brazil	7944 pts	CR
5000 metres	Fabiana Cristine da Silva	Brazil	15:39.67	CR
5000 metres	Rosa Godoy	Argentina	15:43.36	NR
10,000 metres	Simone da Silva	Brazil	31:59.11	CR
10,000 metres	Rosa Godoy	Argentina	32:51.10	NR
Pole vault	Fabiana Murer	Brazil	4.70 m	CR
Javelin throw	Leryn Franco	Paraguay	55.66 m	NR
Hammer throw	Jennifer Dahlgren	Argentina	72.70 m	CR
Key:WR — World record • AR — Area record • CR — Championship record • NR — National record

== Medal summary ==
=== Men's results ===
==== Track ====
Event	Gold		Silver		Bronze	
100 metres	Nilson André; Brazil	10.35	Kael Becerra; Chile	10.41	Sandro Viana; Brazil	10.44
200 metres	Daniel Grueso; Colombia	20.90	Mariano Jiménez; Argentina	21.06	Cristián Reyes; Chile	21.09
400 metres	Kléberson Davide; Brazil	46.74	Geiner Mosquera; Colombia	47.19	Luis Eduardo Ambrósio; Brazil	47.57
800 metres	Rafith Rodríguez; Colombia	1:51.38	Kléberson Davide; Brazil	1:52.42	Sebastián Vega; Argentina	1:52.43
1500 metres	Leandro de Oliveira; Brazil	3:45.55	Hudson de Souza; Brazil	3:46.35	Federico Bruno; Argentina	3:47.81
5000 metres	Javier Carriqueo; Argentina	13:58.27	Víctor Aravena; Chile	13.59.81	Javier Guarín; Colombia	14.00.64
10,000 metres	Giovani dos Santos; Brazil	28:41.02	Damião de Souza; Brazil	28.53.94	Jhon Tello; Colombia	28.56.46
110 metres hurdles	Matheus Inocêncio; Brazil	13.70	Jorge McFarlane; Peru	13.77	Paulo Villar; Colombia	13.85
400 metres hurdles	Andrés Silva; Uruguay	49.94	Mahau Suguimati; Brazil	51.11	Víctor Solarte; Venezuela	51.13
3000 metres steeplechase	Hudson de Souza; Brazil	8:36.53	Marvin Blanco; Venezuela	8:37.02	Mariano Mastromarino; Argentina	8:38.91
20,000 metres track walk	Andrés Chocho; Ecuador	1:20:23.8 AR	Gustavo Restrepo; Colombia	1:20:36.6 NR	Yerko Araya; Chile	1:20:47.2 NR
4×100 metres relay	Brazil; Carlos Roberto de Moraes, Jr. Sandro Viana; Nilson André; Ailson Feitosa	39.87	Colombia; Isidro Montoya; Geiner Mosquera; Luis Carlos Nuñez; Daniel Grueso	39.88	Chile; Ignacio Rojas; Cristián Reyes; Kael Becerra; Jorge Rojas	40.83
4×400 metres relay	Brazil; Luís Ambrosio; Kléberson Davide; Wagner Cardoso; Hederson Stefani	3:08.95	Colombia; Yeison Rivas; Geiner Mosquera; Diego Palomeque; Rafith Rodríguez	3:09.67	Argentina; Josué Iarritú; Fabio Martínez; Miguel Wilken; Mariano Jiménez	3:13.30
WR world record | AR area record | CR championship record | GR games record | NR national record | OR Olympic record | PB personal best | SB season best | WL world leading (in a given season)

==== Field ====
Event	Gold		Silver		Bronze	
High jump	Diego Ferrín; Ecuador	2.23	Guilherme Cobbo; Brazil	2.20	Carlos Layoy; Argentina	2.20
Pole vault	Fábio Gomes da Silva; Brazil	5.35	Germán Chiaraviglio; Argentina	5.30	Rubén Benítez; Argentina	4.90
Long jump	Jorge McFarlane; Peru	7.95	Rafael Mello; Brazil	7.85	Daniel Pineda; Chile	7.82
Triple jump	Maximiliano Díaz; Argentina	16.51 NR	Jonathan Henrique Silva; Brazil	16.45	Jefferson Sabino; Brazil	16.45
Shot put	Germán Lauro; Argentina	19.61	Eder Moreno; Colombia	18.93	Maximiliano Alonso; Chile	17.95
Discus throw	Ronald Julião; Brazil	62.72 CR	Germán Lauro; Argentina	59.98	Jesús Parejo; Venezuela	57.42
Hammer throw	Juan Ignacio Cerra; Argentina	72.12	Wagner Domingos; Brazil	70.65	Allan Wolski; Brazil	66.85
Javelin throw	Arley Ibargüen; Colombia	73.61	Dayron Márquez; Colombia	73.15	Víctor Fatecha; Paraguay	72.51
Decathlon	Luiz Alberto de Araújo; Brazil	7944 CR	Román Gastaldi; Argentina	7545	Georni Jaramillo; Venezuela	7051
WR world record | AR area record | CR championship record | GR games record | NR national record | OR Olympic record | PB personal best | SB season best | WL world leading (in a given season)

=== Women's results ===
==== Track ====
Event	Gold		Silver		Bronze	
100 metres	Ana Cláudia Lemos; Brazil	11.46	Yomara Hinestroza; Colombia	11.63	Rosemar Coelho Neto; Brazil	11.80
200 metres	Ana Cláudia Lemos; Brazil	23.18	Norma González; Colombia	23.22	Jailma de Lima; Brazil	23.54
400 metres	Norma González; Colombia	52.14	Jennifer Padilla; Colombia	52.55	Geisa Coutinho; Brazil	52.84
800 metres	Rosibel García; Colombia	2:04.76	Andrea Ferris; Panama	2:05.13	Muriel Coneo; Colombia	2:05.25
1500 metres	Rosibel García; Colombia	4:22.18	Tatiele de Carvalho; Brazil	4:22.94	Sandra Amarillo; Argentina	4:23.94
5000 metres	Fabiana Cristine da Silva; Brazil	15:39.67 CR	Rosa Godoy; Argentina	15:43.36 NR	Cruz Nonata da Silva; Brazil	15:43.91
10,000 metres	Simone da Silva; Brazil	31:59.11 CR	Rosa Godoy; Argentina	32:51.10 NR	Cruz Nonata da Silva; Brazil	32:53.72
100 metres hurdles	Brigitte Merlano; Colombia	13.07	Maíla Paula Machado; Brazil	13.22	Marcela Flórez; Colombia	13.23
400 metres hurdles	Jailma de Lima; Brazil	57.13	Princesa Oliveros; Colombia	58.07	Déborah Rodríguez; Uruguay	58.63
3000 metres steeplechase	Ángela Figueroa; Colombia	9:58.00	Eliane Luanda da Silva; Brazil	10:22.96	Jovana de la Cruz; Peru	10:24.67
20,000 metres track walk	Ingrid Hernández; Colombia	1:32:09.4 AR, CR	Milangela Rosales; Venezuela	1:32:17.6 NR	Arabelly Orjuela; Colombia	1:32:48.7
4×100 metres relay	Colombia; Eliecith Palacios; Alejandra Idrobo; Yomara Hinestroza; Norma González	44.11	Brazil; Rosemar Coelho Neto; Vanda Gomes; Ana Cláudia Lemos; Franciela Krasucki	44.56	Chile; María Carolina Díaz; María Fernanda Mackenna; Isidora Jiménez; Daniela Pavez	46.42
4x400 metres relay	Brazil; Geisa Coutinho; Aline dos Santos; Joelma Sousa; Jailma de Lima	3:31.66	Colombia; María Alejandra Idrobo; Evelis Aguilar; Princesa Oliveros; Jennifer Padilla	3:37.66	Chile; Javiera Errazuriz; Isidora Jiménez; Paula Goni; María Fernanda Mackenna	3:49.51
WR world record | AR area record | CR championship record | GR games record | NR national record | OR Olympic record | PB personal best | SB season best | WL world leading (in a given season)

==== Field ====
Event	Gold		Silver		Bronze	
High jump	Marielys Rojas; Venezuela	1.80	Betsabé Páez; Argentina	1.77	Aline Fernanda Santos; Brazil	1.77
Pole vault	Fabiana Murer; Brazil	4.70 CR, WL	Karla Rosa da Silva; Brazil	4.00	Milena Agudelo; Colombia	3.90
Long jump	Maurren Maggi; Brazil	6.52	Keila Costa; Brazil	6.45	Caterine Ibargüen; Colombia	6.45
Triple jump	Caterine Ibargüen; Colombia	14.59	Keila Costa; Brazil	13.96	Gisele de Oliveira; Brazil	13.43
Shot put	Natalia Ducó; Chile	17.15	Elisângela Adriano; Brazil	16.55	Anyela Rivas; Colombia	16.15
Discus throw	Andressa de Morais; Brazil	57.54	Karen Gallardo; Chile	54.91	Fernanda Martins; Brazil	54.18
Hammer throw	Jennifer Dahlgren; Argentina	72.70 CR	Johana Moreno; Colombia	68.53	Andreína Rodríguez; Venezuela	67.28
Javelin throw	María Lucelly Murillo; Colombia	55.85	Leryn Franco; Paraguay	55.66 NR	Alessandra Resende; Brazil	54.61
Heptathlon	Vanessa Spínola; Brazil	5428	Agustina Zerboni; Argentina	5226	Melry Caldeira; Brazil	5208
WR world record | AR area record | CR championship record | GR games record | NR national record | OR Olympic record | PB personal best | SB season best | WL world leading (in a given season)

== Medal table ==
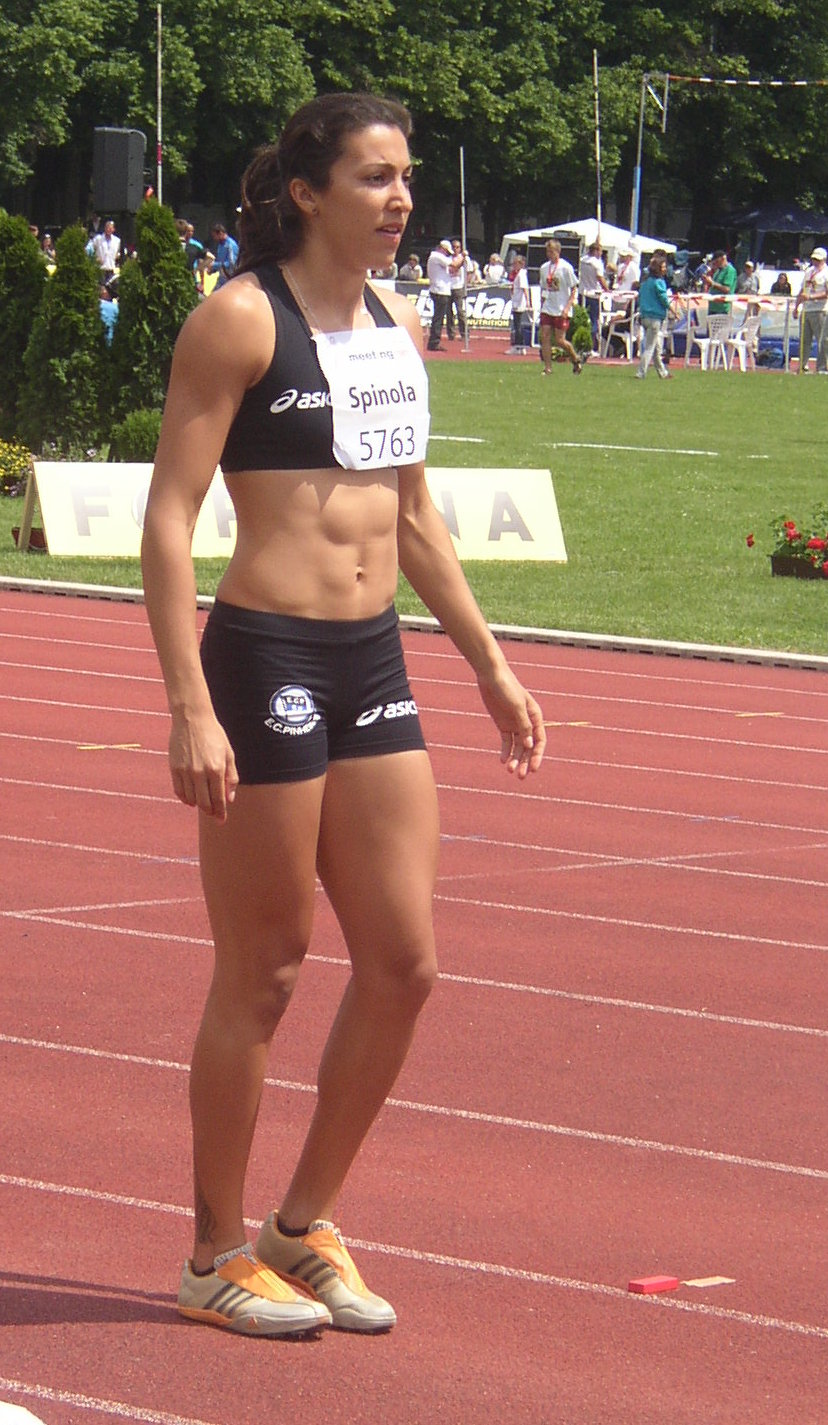
Vanessa Spínola was Brazil's gold medalist in the heptathlon.

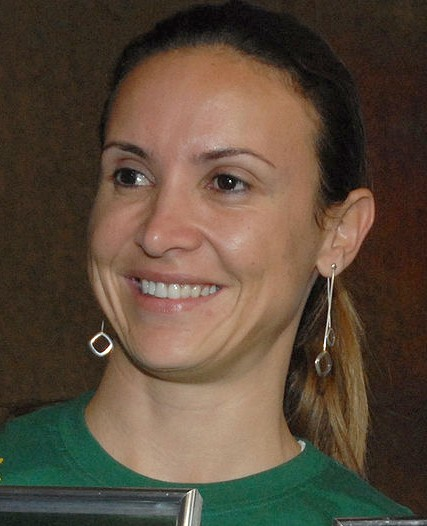
Maurren Maggi won a sixth South American gold for Brazil.

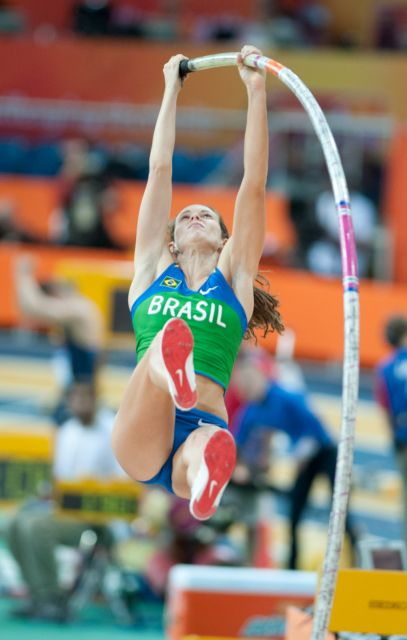
Fabiana Murer broke the championship record in the pole vault.

* Host nation (Argentina)

Rank	Nation	Gold	Silver	Bronze	Total
1	Brazil	21	16	14	51
2	Colombia	12	12	9	33
3	Argentina*	5	8	7	20
4	Ecuador	2	0	0	2
5	Chile	1	3	7	11
6	Venezuela	1	2	4	7
7	Peru	1	1	1	3
8	Uruguay	1	0	1	2
9	Paraguay	0	1	1	2
10	Panama	0	1	0	1
Totals (10 entries)		44	44	44	132

=== Points table ===
Rank	Nation	Total	Men	Women
1	Brazil	488	250	238
2	Colombia	292	189	103
3	Argentina	214.5	138	76.5
4	Chile	100.5	54	46.5
5	Venezuela	54	29	25
6	Peru	39	24	15
7	Ecuador	37	26	11
8	Paraguay	24	9	15
9	Uruguay	20	16	4
10	Panama	6	0	6
11	Bolivia	3	3	0
12=	Aruba	0	0	0
12=	Suriname	0	0	0

- Note: Points are scored by athlete's finishing positions in event finals. All data from official website.

== Participating nations ==
- Argentina (71) (Host nation)
- Aruba (1)
- Bolivia (11)
- Brazil (78)
- Chile (34)
- Colombia (56)
- Ecuador (22)
- Panama (3)
- Paraguay (25)
- Peru (15)
- Suriname (1)
- Uruguay (13)
- Venezuela (15)
