= Milangela Rosales =

Venezuelan race walker

Milángela Rosales
Personal information
- Full name: Milángela Franchesca Rosales Davila
- Born: 21 February 1987 (age 39) Mérida, Mérida, Mexico
- Height: 1.60 m (5 ft 3 in)
- Weight: 55 kg (121 lb)

Sport
- Country: Venezuela
- Sport: Athletics
- Updated on 27 June 2013

Milangela Rosales (born 21 February 1987) is a Venezuelan race walker. She competed in the 20 km kilometres event at the 2012 Summer Olympics.

== Personal bests ==
- 10,000 metres walk: 46:40.22 min – San Fernando, Spain, 4 June 2010
- 20,000 metres walk: 1:32:17.6 hrs – Buenos Aires, Argentina, 5 June 2011

== International competitions ==
Year	Competition	Venue	Position	Event	Notes
Representing Venezuela
2006	South American Race Walking Championships	Cochabamba, Bolivia	8th	10 km walk Junior (U-20)	56:41 min
2007	ALBA Games	Caracas, Venezuela	5th	20 km walk	1:48:06 hrs
2008	Ibero-American Championships	Iquique, Chile	4th	10,000 m walk	47:02.88 min
2008	Central American and Caribbean Championships	Cali, Colombia	2nd	10,000 m walk	51:06.83 min A
2008	South American Under-23 Championships	Lima, Peru	4th	20,000m walk	1:45:13.0 hrs A
2009	ALBA Games	Havana, Cuba	3rd	10 km walk	47:49 min
2009	South American Championships	Lima, Peru	5th	20,000 m walk	1:39:17.3 hrs A
2009	Central American and Caribbean Championships	Havana, Cuba	4th	10 km walk	50:11 min
2010	South American Race Walking Championships	Cochabamba, Bolivia	3rd	20 km walk	1:43:33 hrs A
2010	World Race Walking Cup	Chihuahua, Mexico	48th	20 km walk	1:48:12 hrs A
2010	Ibero-American Championships	San Fernando, Spain	1st	10,000 m walk	46:40.22 min
2010	Central American and Caribbean Games	Mayagüez, Puerto Rico	2nd	20 km walk	1:40:16 hrs
2011	Pan American Race Walking Cup	Envigado, Colombia	17th	20 km walk	1:45:17 hrs
2011	South American Championships	Buenos Aires, Argentina	2nd	20,000 m walk	1:32:17.6 hrs
2011	World Championships	Daegu, South Korea	35th	20 km walk	1:40:49 hrs
2011	Pan American Games	Guadalajara, Mexico	11th	20 km walk	1:43:17 hrs A
2012	World Race Walking Cup	Saransk, Russia	45th	20 km walk	1:38:43 hrs
2012	Ibero-American Championships	Barquisimeto, Venezuela	3rd	10,000 m walk	48:10.85 hrs
2012	Olympic Games	London, United Kingdom	55th	20 km walk	1:42:46 hrs
2013	Pan American Race Walking Cup	Guatemala City, Guatemala	–	20 km walk	DNF
2017	South American Championships	Asunción, Paraguay	5th	20,000 m walk	1:43:34.3 hrs
2017	Bolivarian Games	Santa Marta, Colombia	–	20 km walk	DNF
2023	Central American and Caribbean Games	San Salvador, El Salvador	7th	20 km walk	1:45:49
2026	Pan American Championships	Medellín, Colombia	–	Half marathon walk	DNF
2026	Central American and Caribbean Games	Santo Domingo, Dominican Republic	–	Half marathon walk	DNF
2026	Central American and Caribbean Games	Santo Domingo, Dominican Republic	4th	Marathon walk	4:11:52
