= Omar Cisneros =

Cuban track and field athlete

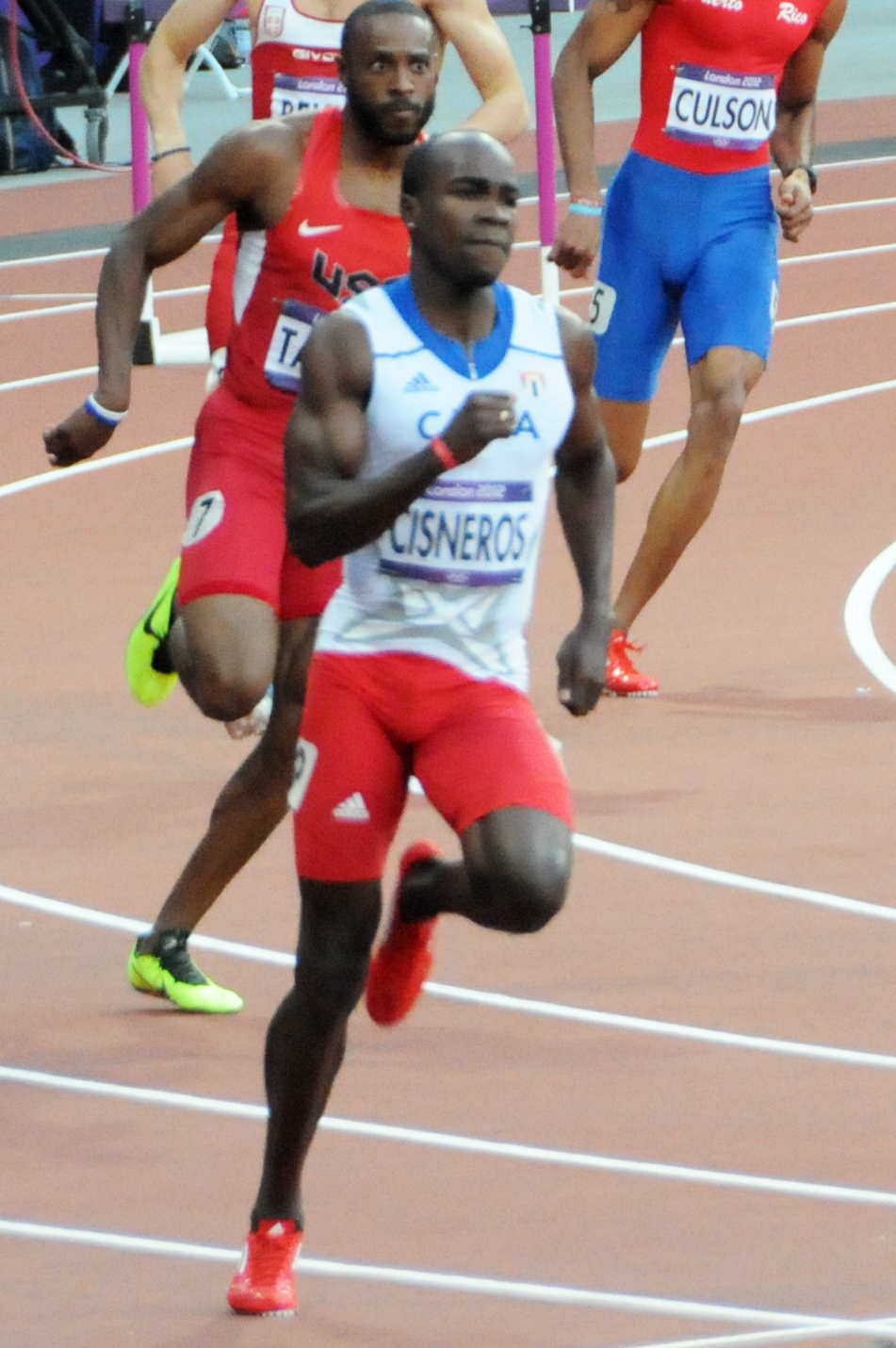

Personal information
- Full name: Omar Cisneros Bonora
- Born: 19 November 1989 (age 36) Nuevitas, Camagüey, Cuba
- Height: 1.80 m (5 ft 11 in)
- Weight: 67 kg (148 lb)

Sport
- Country: Cuba
- Sport: Athletics
- Event: 4 × 400m Relay
Medal record
Pan American Games
Gold medal – first place	2011 Guadalajara	400 m hurdles
Gold medal – first place	2011 Guadalajara	4×400 m relay
CAC Championships
Gold medal – first place	2008 Cali	4×400 m relay
Gold medal – first place	2009 Havana	4×400 m relay
Bronze medal – third place	2008 Cali	400 m
- Updated on 21 December 2014

Omar Cisneros Bonora (born 19 November 1989) is a Cuban track and field athlete who competes in the 400 metres hurdles. He is the Cuban national record holder for the event with his personal best of 47.99 seconds. He won gold medals in the hurdles and 4×400 metres relay at the Pan American Games in 2011.

Cisneros represented Cuba at the 2008 Summer Olympics at the age of eighteen and competed at the World Championships in Athletics in 2009 and 2011, and the 2012 Summer Olympics. He has also won gold medals with the Cuban relay team at the Central American and Caribbean Championships in Athletics.

== Early life ==
Born in Nuevitas, Camagüey, Cisneros is one of three children. His mother is a chemical engineer and his father, Omar Cisneros snr, was also a 400 m runner. His father encouraged him to take up athletics, but Cisneros originally wanted to play baseball. He took part in the 2004 National School Games and then the 2005 National Junior Championships. In 2006 he won his first medal at the National Junior Championships in the 400 m hurdles. At the end of that year, he joined the National Junior team under coach Ricardo Molina who still coached him in 2012.

== Career ==
Cisneros made his first international appearances in 2007. He began his career competing both the hurdles and the 400 metres sprint. After ran a personal best time of 46.05 seconds for the flat race at a local meeting in March, he won the national junior title in the event. He won two titles at the 2007 ALBA Games, running a national junior record of 49.57 seconds to win the 400 m hurdles before going on to help the Cuban 4×400 metres relay team take a second gold medal. He was chosen for the Cuban squad at the 2007 Pan American Games and managed to reach the semi-finals of the 400 m, although the relay team were disqualified in the heats.

He decided to focus solely on the 400 m flat in 2008 and dipped under 46 seconds (45.98) to take the bronze medal at the 2008 Central American and Caribbean Championships. A team comprising William Collazo, Yunier Pérez, Cisneros and Yeimer López also won the relay gold medal and their time of 3:02.10 minutes meant the team had achieved the Olympic qualifying time. Cisneros won another gold with the relay team at the 2008 Ibero-American Championships in Athletics and went on to make his Olympic debut at the age of eighteen at the 2008 Beijing Games, where he ran a split of 44.36 seconds in the heats.

A personal best of 45.76 seconds for the 400 m opened Cisneros' 2009 season, but it was at this point that he began to focus more on the 400 m hurdling event. He ran a personal best of 49.49 seconds to win the gold at the 2009 ALBA Games and also helped defend Cuba's relay title. At the Barrientos Memorial he improved his best by almost half a second, running a time of 48.87 seconds to become the second Cuban under 49 seconds after Yacnier Luis. He was a little short of this form at July's 2009 Central American and Caribbean Championships in Athletics, where he finished in fourth place, but he did win a consecutive relay gold medal for Cuba at the competition. He made his individual global debut at the 2009 World Championships in Athletics and came fifth in his 400 m hurdles semi-final, clocking a time of 49.21 seconds.

With no major competitions scheduled for 2010, he made his debut on the Diamond League circuit, coming fifth at the Doha meeting. He won gold medals at the 2010 Ibero-American Championships in Athletics both the hurdles and relay events. That July in Havana he improved his 400 m hurdles best by six tenths of a second, breaking the Cuban record held by Yacnier Luis with a run of 48.29 seconds. Two weeks later, the 20-year-old went even faster with a time of 48.21 seconds. In the first half of 2011 he won the Barrientos Memorial and two European meets in Cottbus and Celle Ligure. Cisneros represented Cuba in the hurdles at the 2011 World Championships in Athletics, but was some way off his best form and finished last in his semi-final with a run of 50.10 seconds. In spite of this modest season, the 2011 Pan American Games in October in Guadalajara saw Cisneros reach a new career peak. He won his hurdles heat with a time of 48.99 seconds – his fastest run away from Cuban soil. Although he entered the competition with a hope of reaching the top three, he dominated the final with a national and Pan American Games record run of 47.99 seconds, finishing almost a second ahead of the minor medalists Isa Phillips and Félix Sánchez. The time made him the fifth fastest hurdler in the world that year. He ended the competition with a second victory in the 4×400 m relay and the time of 2:59.43 minutes set by a team of Noel Ruíz, Yoandri Betanzos, Cisneros and Collazo was the fastest by a Cuban quartet since the 1992 Barcelona Olympics, where the country won Olympic silver.

At the 2012 Olympics, he competed in both the 400 m hurdles and the 4 × 400 m relay team.

He finished 4th in the 400 m hurdles at the 2013 World Championships.

== Personal bests ==
- 200 m: 21.36 s (wind: -0.1 m/s) – Havana, Cuba, 9 February 2007
- 400 m: 45.47 s – Padua, Italy, 2 September 2012
- 400 m hurdles: 47.93 s NR – Moscow, Russia, 13 August 2013

== Achievements ==
Year	Competition	Venue	Position	Event	Notes
Representing Cuba
2007	ALBA Games	Caracas, Venezuela	1st	400 m hurdles	49.57 s
2007	Pan American Games	Rio de Janeiro, Brazil	13th (sf)	400 m	46.62 s
2008	Ibero-American Championships	Iquique, Chile	1st	4 × 400 m relay	3:03.22 min
2008	Central American and Caribbean Championships	Cali, Colombia	3rd	400 m	45.98 s A
2008	Central American and Caribbean Championships	Cali, Colombia	1st	4 × 400 m relay	3:02.10 min A
2008	Olympic Games	Beijing, China	10th	4 × 400 m relay	3:02.24 min
2009	ALBA Games	Havana, Cuba	1st	400 m hurdles	49.49 s
2009	ALBA Games	Havana, Cuba	1st	4 × 400 m relay	3:08.17 min
2009	Central American and Caribbean Championships	Havana, Cuba	4th	400 m hurdles	49.99 s
2009	Central American and Caribbean Championships	Havana, Cuba	1st	4 × 400 m relay	3:03.26 min
2009	World Championships	Berlin, Germany	11th (sf)	400 m hurdles	49.21 s
2010	Ibero-American Championships	San Fernando, Spain	1st	400 m hurdles	49.19 s
2010	Ibero-American Championships	San Fernando, Spain	1st	4 × 400 m relay	3:04.86 min
2011	Pan American Games	Guadalajara, Mexico	1st	400 m hurdles	47.99 s A GR NR
2011	Pan American Games	Guadalajara, Mexico	1st	4 × 400 m relay	2:59.43 min SB
2011	World Championships	Daegu, South Korea	21st (sf)	400 m hurdles	50.10 s
2012	Olympic Games	London, United Kingdom	3rd (sf)	400 m hurdles	48.23 s SB
2012	Olympic Games	London, United Kingdom	3rd (h)^{1}	4 × 400 m relay	3:00.55
2013	World Championships	Moscow, Russia	4th	400m hurdles	48.12
2014	Central American and Caribbean Games	Xalapa, Mexico	1st	400m hurdles	49.56 A

^{1}: Did not finish in the final.
