= Yunier Pérez =

Cuban sprinter

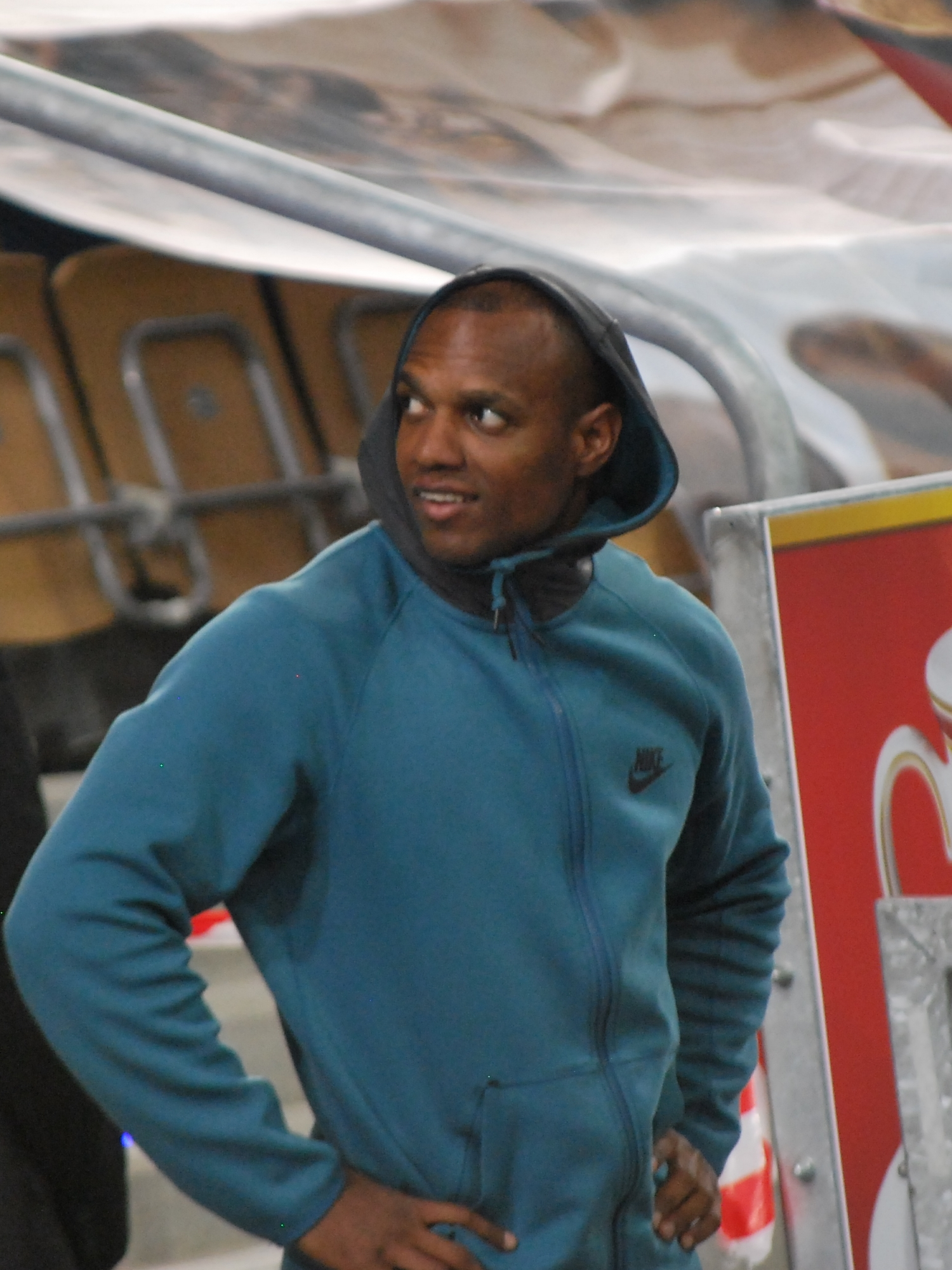
- Yunier Pérez in 2015

Personal information
- Full name: Yunier Pérez Romero
- Nationality: Spanish
- Born: 16 February 1985 (age 41) San José de las Lajas, La Habana
- Height: 1.76 m (5 ft 9 1/2 in)
- Weight: 70 kg (154 lb)

Sport
- Sport: Athletics
- Event: sprinting
Medal record
CAC Championships
Gold medal – first place	2008 Cali	4×400 m relay

Yunier Pérez Romero (born February 16, 1985, in San José de las Lajas) is a Cuban track and field athlete, who specializes in sprinting events.

He won gold medals with the Cuban relay team at the 2008 Central American and Caribbean Championships in Cali, Colombia, with an Olympic qualifying time of 3:02.10. Perez competed for the men's 4 × 400 m relay at the 2008 Summer Olympics in Beijing, along with his teammates Omar Cisneros, William Collazo, and Yunior Díaz. He ran on the starting leg of the first heat, with an individual-split time of 45.95 seconds. Perez and his national relay team, however, finished seventh in the preliminary heats, for a total time of 3:02.24, failing to advance into the final round.

== Personal bests ==
Event	Points	Venue	Date
60 metres	6.49	Moscow, Russia	February 2, 2014
100 metres	10.00	Madrid, Spain	July 17, 2017
200 metres	20.75	Cali, Colombia	July 5, 2008
400 metres	46.72	Havana, Cuba	June 3, 2006

- All information taken from IAAF profile.

== Achievements ==
Year	Competition	Venue	Position	Event	Notes
Representing Cuba
2005	ALBA Games	La Habana, Cuba	2nd	200 m	21.16 s (wind: +0.0 m/s)
2005	ALBA Games	La Habana, Cuba	1st	4 × 400 m relay	3:08.14 min
2005	Central American and Caribbean Championships	Nassau, Bahamas	9th (sf)	200 m	21.13 s (wind: +0.3 m/s)
2008	Central American and Caribbean Championships	Cali, Colombia	4th	200 m	20.84 s (wind: +0.5 m/s)
2008	Central American and Caribbean Championships	Cali, Colombia	1st	4 × 400 m relay	3:02.10 min
2008	Olympic Games	Beijing, China	8th	4 × 400 m relay	3:02.24 min
2009	Central American and Caribbean Championships	La Habana, Cuba	4th	200 m	20.83 s (wind: -1.1 m/s)
2010	Ibero-American Championships	San Fernando, Spain	2nd	100 m	10.37 s (wind: -0.2 m/s)
2010	Ibero-American Championships	San Fernando, Spain	8th (h)	200 m	21.41 s (wind: -0.6 m/s)
2010	Ibero-American Championships	San Fernando, Spain	1st	4 × 400 m relay	3:04.86 min
