= Patrícia Lopes =

Portuguese athlete (born 1982)

Patrícia Lopes (born 11 July 1982) is a Portuguese athlete who specialises in the 400 metres and 400 metres hurdles. She won the silver medal in the latter at the 2001 European Junior Championships.

== Competition record ==
Year	Competition	Venue	Position	Event	Notes
Representing Portugal
1999	World Youth Championships	Bydgoszcz, Poland	29th (h)	100 m hurdles	14.79
1999	World Youth Championships	Bydgoszcz, Poland	7th	400 m hurdles	59.86
1999	European Junior Championships	Riga, Latvia	7th	400 m hurdles	60.72
2000	World Junior Championships	Santiago, Chile	13th (h)	400 m hurdles	59.34
2001	European Junior Championships	Grosseto, Italy	2nd	400 m hurdles	57.93
2002	European Championships	Munich, Germany	9th (h)	4 × 400 m relay	3:35.36
2003	European U23 Championships	Bydgoszcz, Poland	11th (h)	400 m hurdles	58.95
2004	Ibero-American Championships	Huelva, Spain	7th (h)	400 m hurdles	58.24
2005	Universiade	İzmir, Turkey	17th (h)	400 m	58.73
2005	Universiade	İzmir, Turkey	16th (h)	400 m hurdles	55.33
2007	Universiade	Bangkok, Thailand	10th (h)	400 m hurdles	57.98
2009	European Indoor Championships	Turin, Italy	14th (h)	400 m	54.04
2009	Lusophony Games	Lisbon, Portugal	2nd	400 m hurdles	57.05
2009	Lusophony Games	Lisbon, Portugal	2nd	4 × 400 m relay	3:37.90
2010	Ibero-American Championships	San Fernando, Spain	2nd	400 m hurdles	57.50
2010	Ibero-American Championships	San Fernando, Spain	6th	4 × 400 m relay	3:39.37
2010	European Championships	Barcelona, Spain	18th (h)	400 m hurdles	56.78
2011	European Indoor Championships	Paris, France	11th (sf)	400 m	55.09

== Personal bests ==
Outdoor

- 200 metres – 25.14 (+0.1 m/s) (Leiria 2007)
- 400 metres – 55.33 (Izmir 2005)
- 400 metres hurdles – 56.78 (Barcelona 2010)

Indoor

- 400 metres – 54.04 (Turin 2009)
