= Miguel López (athlete) =

Puerto Rican sprinter (born 1990)

Personal information
- Full name: Miguel López Correa
- Born: April 9, 1990 (age 36) Santurce, Puerto Rico

Sport
- Country: Puerto Rico
- Sport: Athletics
- Event: Sprinting
- Updated on 21 January 2015

Miguel López Correa (born April 9, 1990) is a Puerto Rican sprinter. At the 2012 Summer Olympics, he competed in the Men's 100 metres.

== Personal bests ==
Event	Result	Wind	Venue	Date
100 m	10.21 s A	+1.4 m/s	Cochabamba, Bolivia	27 May 2012
200 m	20.70 s	+0.1 m/s	Ponce, Puerto Rico	12 May 2012

== Competition record ==
Year	Competition	Venue	Position	Event	Notes
Representing Puerto Rico
2007	World Youth Championships	Ostrava, Czech Republic	54th (h)	100m	11.22 (wind: -1.3 m/s)
2007	World Youth Championships	Ostrava, Czech Republic	53rd (h)	200m	22.98 (wind: -3.0 m/s)
2008	World Junior Championships	Bydgoszcz, Poland	18th (sf)	100m	10.75 (wind: -0.4 m/s)
2008	World Junior Championships	Bydgoszcz, Poland	18th (h)	4 × 400 m relay	3:12.58
2009	Central American and Caribbean Championships	Havana, Cuba	17th (h)	100 m	10.55 (wind: 0.0 m/s)
2009	Central American and Caribbean Championships	Havana, Cuba	17th (h)	200 m	21.45 (wind: +0.5 m/s)
2009	Pan American Junior Championships	Port of Spain, Trinidad and Tobago	8th	100m	10.50 (wind: +0.7 m/s)
2009	Pan American Junior Championships	Port of Spain, Trinidad and Tobago	2nd (h)	200m	21.52 (wind: -0.1 m/s)
2010	Ibero-American Championships	San Fernando, Spain	6th	100m	10.44 (wind: -0.2 m/s)
2010	Ibero-American Championships	San Fernando, Spain	1st	4 × 100 m relay	39.31
2010	Central American and Caribbean Games	Mayagüez, Puerto Rico	12th (h)	100m	10.39 (wind: +1.1 m/s)
2010	Central American and Caribbean Games	Mayagüez, Puerto Rico	15th (h)	200m	21.22 (wind: -1.0 m/s)
2010	Central American and Caribbean Games	Mayagüez, Puerto Rico	4th	4 × 100 m relay	39.18
2011	Central American and Caribbean Championships	Mayagüez, Puerto Rico	9th (h)	100m	10.50 (wind: -1.3 m/s)
2011	Central American and Caribbean Championships	Mayagüez, Puerto Rico	5th	4 × 100 m relay	39.71
2011	World Championships	Daegu, South Korea	13th (h)	4 × 100 m relay	39.04
2011	Pan American Games	Guadalajara, Mexico	17th (h)	100m	10.48 (wind: -1.0 m/s)
2011	Pan American Games	Guadalajara, Mexico	—	4 × 100 m relay	DNF
2012	Ibero-American Championships	Barquisimeto, Venezuela	6th	200m	21.04 (wind: -0.9 m/s)
2012	Olympic Games	London, United Kingdom	34th (h)	100m	10.31 (wind: +2.0 m/s)
2013	Central American and Caribbean Championships	Morelia, Mexico	9th (h)	100m	10.24 A (wind: +1.7 m/s)
2013	Central American and Caribbean Championships	Morelia, Mexico	10th (h)	200m	21.02 A (wind: -0.9 m/s)
2013	Central American and Caribbean Championships	Morelia, Mexico	5th	4 × 100 m relay	39.72 A
2014	Pan American Sports Festival	Mexico City, Mexico	6th	100m	10.40 A (wind: -1.3 m/s)
