= Ana Cláudia Lemos =

Brazilian sprinter (born 1988)

Personal information
- Born: Ana Claudia Lemos Silva; 6 November 1988 (age 37) Jaguaretama, Ceará, Brazil
- Height: 158 cm (5 ft 2 in)
- Weight: 56 kg (123 lb)

Sport
- Sport: Athletics
- Event: Sprint

Achievements and titles
- Personal bests: 60 m: 7.36 s (2012); 100 m: 11.01 s (Walnut 2015); 100 m (wind assisted): 10.93 s (Campinas 2013); 200 m: 22.48 s (Guadalajara 2011); 4×100 m relay: 42.29
Medal record
Representing Brazil
Pan American Games
| Gold medal – first place | 2011 Guadalajara | 200 m |
| Gold medal – first place | 2011 Guadalajara | 4×100 m relay |
South American Championships
| Gold medal – first place | 2011 Buenos Aires | 100 m |
| Gold medal – first place | 2011 Buenos Aires | 200 m |
| Gold medal – first place | 2013 Cartagena | 100 m |
| Gold medal – first place | 2013 Cartagena | 200 m |
| Gold medal – first place | 2013 Cartagena | 4×100 m relay |
| Silver medal – second place | 2011 Buenos Aires | 4×100 m relay |
Military World Games
| Gold medal – first place | 2011 Rio de Janeiro | 200 m |
| Gold medal – first place | 2011 Rio de Janeiro | 4×100 m relay |
| Silver medal – second place | 2011 Rio de Janeiro | 100 m |

Ana Cláudia Lemos Silva (Brazilian Portuguese: [ˈɐ̃nɐ ˈklawdʒɐ ˈlẽmus]; born 6 November 1988) is a Brazilian track and field athlete who competes in sprinting events. She is the former South American record holder in the 100 metres (11.05 seconds) and the current (2017) record holder in the 200 metres (22.48 seconds). She also was part of the team that broke the 4×100 metres relay continental record with a time of 42.29 seconds.

She emerged on the international scene with gold medal wins at the 2010 South American Games and 2010 Ibero-American Championships. Lemos Silva is the reigning South American Champion over both 100 m and 200 m. She is also a three-time Military World Games medallist and two-time gold medallist at 2011 Pan American Games in the 200 metres and 4 × 100 m relay. She represented her country at the 2012 Summer Olympics and is known for her beauty as well.

== Career ==
Born in Jaguaretama, Ceará, her favorite sport initially was football. Given her speed in the games, she was encouraged to represent her school in athletics competitions. After much success in school competitions, she began to work with a sprinting coach, Roberto Bortollo.

She began competing at the national level around 2005 and made her international debut at the 2006 South American Games, where she ran in both the 100 metres and 200 metres. Her first medals for Brazil came the following year, as she took the 200 m bronze medal in a personal best of 24.05 seconds and won the 4×100 metres relay gold medal at the South American Junior Athletics Championships. Her 2008 season was highlighted by her first senior medal, a silver, which she won with the Brazilian relay team at the 2008 Ibero-American Championships.

=== South American records ===
Lemos Silva improved her 100 m best to 11.57 seconds in 2009 and was chosen as a backup relay runner for the 2009 World Championships in Athletics, although she did not compete. She chose to change coaching arrangements around this time, working with Brazilian Olympian Katsuhiko Nakaya and training under BM&F Bovespa's track club. The change saw Lemos Silva rapidly develop and at the 2010 South American Games, held at altitude in Medellín, she equalled Lucimar de Moura's South American record of 11.17 seconds. She won the 100 m individual and relay titles at the competition and took silver in the 4×400 metres relay. Later that season, she also completed a 100 m/4×100 m relay double at the 2010 Ibero-American Championships. She improved her 200 m best to 23.07 seconds at the Grande Premio Brasil Caixa de Atletismo and then claimed a national 100/200 m sprint double at the Brazilian championships – the Troféu Brasil de Atletismo. In 2010, she ran 11.15 in the 100m and broke the record that belonged to Lucimar Moura since 1999.

Lemos Silva began 2011 in good form, clocking 11.19 seconds and 23.09 seconds for the 100 and 200 m early in the year. At the 2011 South American Championships in Athletics, she won her first continental titles by defeating all comers in the 100 m and 200 m races and was also a runner-up in the relay. At the 2011 Military World Games in Rio de Janeiro she won three medals for Brazil: she set games records to win the 200 m and relay titles, but was narrowly beaten in the 100 m final by Ukraine's Mariya Ryemyen. She improved her 200 m best sixth tenths of a second at the 2011 Brazilian championships to set a South American record of 22.48 seconds breaking Lucimar de Moura's record, en route to retaining her national sprint titles. At the 2011 World Championships in Athletics, she was a semi-finalist in both individual sprints and the relay; she helped the team to a Brazilian record of 42.92 seconds in the heats and placed seventh in the final. Medals came at the 2011 Pan American Games, where she was fourth in the 100 m but won golds in the 200 m and relay events. In the relay, she led off a team including Vanda Gomes, Franciela Krasucki, and Rosângela Santos to break the national record yet again, crossing the line with 42.85 seconds.

== First Olympics ==
In the 2012 season, her outdoor times were down on the previous year (11.30 for the 100 m, 23.01 for the 200 m), but she did manage to set a 60 metres best of 7.36 seconds at the 2012 IAAF World Indoor Championships, where she was a semi-finalist. She was selected for the 200 m at the 2012 Summer Olympics but did not make it past the heats. Success came in the relay, however, as the Brazilian team improved the South American record to 42.55 seconds in the heats and placed seventh in the Olympic final.

== 2012–2016 ==
Her 2013 season started in peak form as she broke the 100 m continental record with a run of 11.05 at the Grande Premio Brasil Caixa de Atletismo. However, she broke 11 seconds, running an impressive 10.93 seconds at the 29th edition of the Grande Prêmio Brasil/Caixa Governo de Pará de Atletismo, an IAAF World Challenge meeting, which took place in the tropical city of Belem. Unfortunately, the wind gauge during the race was too high therefore her time can't be recorded as a legal time. At the 2013 World Championships in Moscow, the team composed of Ana Cláudia Lemos, Evelyn dos Santos, Franciela Krasucki and Rosângela Santos broke the South American record in the semifinals of the women's 4 × 100 m metres relay, with a time of 42.29 seconds. But, strangely and without official explanation, the CBAT (Brazilian Athletics Confederation) held a bizarre athlete change to the final, putting Vanda Gomes (who had never run the relay) instead of Rosangela Santos, to close the race. In the final, Brazil came second, almost tied with Jamaica and with great possibility to win the silver medal and knock the South American record when, at the last bat exchange, Vanda, who had been placed "in fire" in a World Championships final and without sufficient training to receive the baton, eventually leaving the baton fall.

Silva won gold in the 100 m, 200 m, and 4 × 100 m relay in the Brazil Trophy athletic contests held at Icarus Stadium Castro Mello. After winning the 100m dash in an interview she stated "Honestly, I liked the win but did not like the time" with her best recorded time for 2014 at 11.13.
