= Marcos Amalbert =

Puerto Rican long jumper

Personal information
- Nationality: Puerto Rican
- Born: April 9, 1988 (age 38) Puerto Rico

Sport
- Sport: Track and field
- Events: Long jump, 4 × 100 metres relay
- Retired: yes

Achievements and titles
- Personal best

Marcos Amalbert (born 9 April 1988) is a retired Puerto Rican long jumper.

As a junior he won the bronze medal at the 2004 Central American and Caribbean Junior Championships and also at the 2010 NACAC Under-23 Championships. He finished eleventh at the 2010 Ibero-American Championships, fifth at the 2010 Central American and Caribbean Games, eleventh at the 2011 Pan American Games, fifth at the 2011 Central American and Caribbean Championships and seventh at the 2012 Ibero-American Championships

Alambert also won a gold medal in the 4 × 100 metres relay at the 2010 Ibero-American Championships, and competed in the same event 2011 Pan American Games and the 2011 World Championships without reaching the final.

His personal best jump is 7.92 metres, achieved in May 2011 in Bogotá.
