= Simone Alves da Silva =

Brazilian long-distance runner (born 1984)

Medal record

Women's athletics

Representing Brazil

South American Championships
Gold medal – first place	2011 Buenos Aires	10,000 m

Simone Alves da Silva (born 12 September 1984) is a Brazilian long-distance runner. She won the 2011 South American title over 10,000 metres and broke South American records for the 5000 m and 10,000 m events in 2011, but was banned from competition for a doping offence that year.

Born in Morro do Chapéu, she had a rapid ascent in distance running beginning at the age of 24 after joining the BM&F Bovespa athletics club and working with coach Adauto Domingues. She won the Guaratingueta 10K and set a half marathon best of 77:47 minutes at the São Paulo Half Marathon in 2009. She began 2010 with another half marathon best run of 75:43 minutes in São Paulo, coming second in the race, then a 10,000 metres personal best of 33:25.6 minutes to win the State championships.

She was chosen to compete at the 2010 Ibero-American Championships in Athletics and she won the 5000 metres silver medal in a personal best of 15:49.79 minutes before running a 3000 metres best of 9:09.41 minutes for fourth in that contest. She failed a doping test at a 10-mile race in Brazil, being positive for the banned stimulant Oxilofrine, and was suspended from December 2010 to February 2011. She was retrospectively banned, but competed at the Saint Silvester Road Race in the meantime, taking second place behind Alice Timbilil.

Upon her return da Silva won the women's title at the 2011 South American Cross Country Championships, leading Brazil to the team title. That May she broke the South American record for the 5000 m with a run of 15:18.85 minutes at a small meet in São Paulo. At the 2011 South American Championships in Athletics in Buenos Aires she came sixth in the 1500 metres then made a career breakthrough by winning the 10,000 m with a time of 31:59.11 minutes – the second fastest by a South American and a championship record. At the Troféu Brasil de Atletismo later that year she won a 5000/10,000 m national title double. Her 10,000 metres time of 31:16.56 minutes was a new South American record and over half a minute faster than Carmem de Oliveira's previous mark set in 1993.

However, her doping sample at that competition came back positive for erythropoietin (EPO), a banned blood boosting substance. She was provisionally suspended from October 2011 onwards and Clube de Atletismo BM&F Bovespa cut ties with her. A Brazilian Disciplinary Committee acquitted her of the doping offence in January 2012, but the Brazilian Athletics Confederation lodged an appeal to instate a ban on da Silva. She remains banned from competition.
