= 2010 Ibero-American Championships in Athletics =

XIV Ibero-American Championships in Athletics
- Dates: 4–6 June
- Host city: San Fernando, Spain
- Venue: Estadio Municipal Bahía Sur
- Events: 44
- Participation: 449 athletes from 29 nations
- Records set: 12 Championship records

The 2010 Ibero-American Championships in Athletics (Spanish: XIV Campeonato Iberoamericano de Atletismo) was an athletics competition which was held at the Estadio Municipal Bahía Sur in San Fernando, Spain, from 4 to 6 June. A total of 44 events were contested, of which 22 by male and 22 by female athletes. A total of 459 athletes from 29 nations participated in the championships. Twelve championships records were set at the fourteenth edition of the competition.

Cuba topped the medal table with 15 golds and 25 medals in total. The hosts, Spain, were runners-up with 11 golds and 31 medals overall, while Brazil took third place in the final tally. The event was held to coincide with the city's celebration of the 200th anniversary of the meetings of the Cortes of Cádiz, which paved the way towards the liberation of Spanish America.

Brazil's Fabiana Murer provided the highlight of the championships by winning the pole vault with a South American record of 4.85 m – placing her in fourth on the all-time lists. Nilson André scored a sprint double by taking the men's 100 and 200 metres titles. The men's 4×400 metre relay provided Cubans Yeimer López and Omar Cisneros with their second gold medals of the competition, after having won the 800 metres and 400 metres hurdles, respectively. Jessica Augusto of Portugal set a championship record of 8:46.59 in the 3000 metres, along with winning a bronze medal in the 1500 metres.

== Records ==
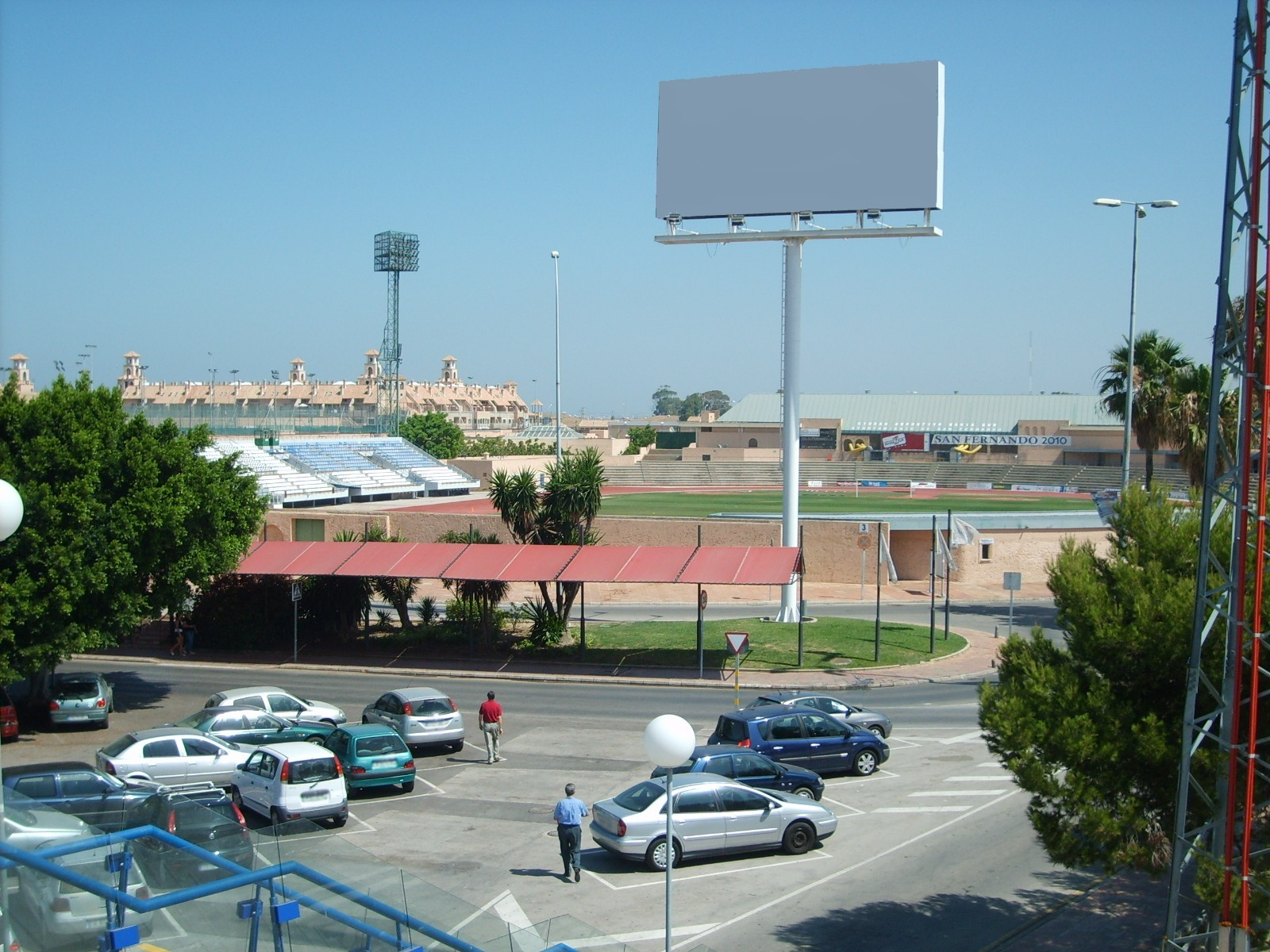
Host stadium in San Fernando.

Name	Event	Country	Record	Type
Men
Héctor Carrasquillo	400 metres	Puerto Rico	45.60	NR
Yeimer López	800 metres	Cuba	1:45.36	CR
Ayad Lamdassem	5000 metres	Spain	13:32.48	CR
Héctor Cotto	110 metres hurdles	Puerto Rico	13.54 m	NR
Alvaro Vásquez	3000 m steeplechase	Nicaragua	9:04.02	NR
Alexis Copello	Triple jump	Cuba	17.28 m	CR
Marco Fortes	Shot put	Portugal	20.69 m	CR NR
Guillermo Martínez	Javelin throw	Cuba	81.71 m	CR
Women
Nuria Fernández	1500 metres	Spain	4:05.71	CR
Juliana Paula Gomes dos Santos	1500 metres	Brazil	4:07.30	NR
Jessica Augusto	3000 metres	Portugal	8:46.59	CR
Rosa Morató	3000 metres steeplechase	Spain	9:40.26	CR
Anay Tejeda	100 metres hurdles	Cuba	12.84	CR
Fabiana Murer	Pole vault	Brazil	4.85	CR; AR
Yargelis Savigne	Triple jump	Cuba	14.62	CR
Ana Cabecinha	10 km walk	Portugal	43:31.21	CR

Key:	WR — World record • AR — Area record • CR — Championship record • NR — National record

== Medal summary ==
=== Men ===
Event	Gold		Silver		Bronze	
100 metres	Nilson André (BRA)	10.24	Yunier Pérez (CUB)	10.37	Daniel Grueso (COL)	10.39
200 metres	Nilson André (BRA)	20.94	Rolando Palacios (HON)	21.20	Yazaldes Nascimento (POR)	21.31
400 metres	Nery Brenes (CRC)	45.19	Williams Collazo (CUB)	45.33	Héctor Carrasquillo (PUR)	45.60 NR
800 metres	Yeimer López (CUB)	1:45.36 CR	Kléberson Davide (BRA)	1:45.82	Antonio Manuel Reina (ESP)	1:46.15
1500 metres	David Bustos (ESP)	3:43.19	Eduardo Villanueva (VEN)	3:43.72	Leandro de Oliveira (BRA)	3:44.08
3000 metres	Leandro de Oliveira (BRA)	8:15.55	Reyes Estévez (ESP)	8:15.58	Joilson da Silva (BRA)	8:16.58
5000 metres	Ayad Lamdassem (ESP)	13:32.48 CR	Marílson Gomes dos Santos (BRA)	13:34.92	Miguel Barzola (ARG)	13:42.55
110 metre hurdles	Héctor Cotto (PUR)	13.54 NR	Jackson Quiñónez (ESP)	13.65	Anselmo Gomes da Silva (BRA)	13.82
400 metre hurdles	Omar Cisneros (CUB)	49.19	Andrés Silva (URU)	49.58	Mahau Camargo Suguimati (BRA)	49.87
3000 metre steeplechase	José Alberto Sánchez (CUB)	8:31.80	Mário Teixeira (POR)	8:32.21	Alberto Paulo (POR)	8:34.52
4×100 metre relay	Puerto Rico (PUR); Marcos Amalbert; Yavid Zackey; Luis López; Miguel López	39.31	Spain (ESP); Iván Mocholí Calabuig; Ángel David Rodríguez; Alberto Gavaldá; Daniel Molowny	39.45	Colombia (COL); Álvaro Gómez; Luis Carlos Nuñez Julio; Isidro Montoya; Daniel Grueso	39.76
4×400 metre relay	Cuba (CUB); Omar Cisneros; Yeimer López; Yunier Pérez; Williams Collazo	3:04.86	Brazil (BRA); Hederson Estefani; Wagner Cardoso; Kléberson Davide; Eduardo Vasconcelos	3:05.43	Venezuela (VEN); Freddy Mezones; Arturo Ramírez; Omar Longart; Albert Bravo	3:05.53
20,000 metres walk	Francisco Arcilla (ESP)	1:24:38.4	Yerko Araya (CHI)	1:25:27.5	Pedro Isidro (POR)	1:25:54.7
High jump	Javier Bermejo (ESP)	2.24 m	Wanner Miller (COL)	2.18 m	Carlos Layoy (ARG)	2.18 m
Pole vault	Lázaro Borges (CUB)	5.60 m	Fábio Gomes da Silva (BRA)	5.55 m	Edi Maia (POR)	5.30 m
Long jump	Wilfredo Martínez (CUB)	8.04 m	Joan Lino Martínez (ESP)	7.68 m	Mauro Vinícius da Silva (BRA)	7.60 m
Triple jump	Alexis Copello (CUB)	17.28 m CR	Yoandri Betanzos (CUB)	17.19 m	Jadel Gregório (BRA)	16.82 m
Shot put	Marco Fortes (POR)	20.69 m CR, NR	Germán Lauro (ARG)	20.43 m	Carlos Véliz (CUB)	20.20 m
Discus throw	Mario Pestano (ESP)	63.01 m	Frank Casañas (ESP)	62.08 m	Jorge Fernández (CUB)	61.76 m
Hammer throw	Roberto Janet (CUB)	73.82 m	Juan Ignacio Cerra (ARG)	71.37 m	Wagner Domingos (BRA)	70.95 m
Javelin throw	Guillermo Martínez (CUB)	81.71 m CR	Víctor Fatecha (PAR)	76.34 m	Dayron Márquez (COL)	74.77 m
Decathlon	Luiz Alberto de Araújo (BRA)	7816 pts	Agustín Félix (ESP)	7395 pts	Román Gastaldi (ARG)	7290 pts

=== Women ===
Event	Gold		Silver		Bronze	
100 metres	Ana Claudia Lemos da Silva (BRA)	11.38	Erika Rivera (PUR)	11.45	Digna Luz Murillo (ESP)	11.49
200 metres	Erika Rivera (PUR)	23.18	Roxana Díaz (CUB)	23.25	Carol Rodríguez (PUR)	23.54
400 metres	Daisurami Bonne (CUB)	52.25	Jennifer Padilla (COL)	52.68	Jailma de Lima (BRA)	52.86
800 metres	Andrea Ferris (PAN)	2:02.86	Rosemary Almanza (CUB)	2:03.03	Indira Terrero (CUB)	2:03.24
1500 metres	Nuria Fernández (ESP)	4:05.71 CR	Juliana Paula dos Santos (BRA)	4:07.30 NR	Jéssica Augusto (POR)	4:08.32
3000 metres	Jéssica Augusto (POR)	8:46.59 CR	Iris Fuentes-Pila (ESP)	9:06.24	Diana Martín (ESP)	9:06.53
5000 metres	Judit Plá (ESP)	15:43.20	Simone da Silva (BRA)	15:49.79	Yolanda Caballero (COL)	15:50.18
100 metre hurdles	Anay Tejeda (CUB)	12.84 CR	Brigitte Merlano (COL)	13.10	Shantia Moss (DOM)	13.25
400 metre hurdles	Zudikey Rodríguez (MEX)	56.33	Patrícia Lopes (POR)	57.50	Laia Forcadell (ESP)	57.73
3000 metre steeplechase	Rosa Morató (ESP)	9:40.26 CR	Zulema Fuentes-Pila (ESP)	9:53.75	Sabine Heitling (BRA)	9:56.02
4×100 metre relay	Brazil (BRA); Ana Claudia Lemos da Silva; Thaíssa Presti; Vanda Gomes; Bárbara Leôncio	43.97	Colombia (COL); Maria Idrobo; Darlenys Obregón; Yomara Hinestroza; Eliecit Palacios	44.29	Spain (ESP); Ana Torrijos; Digna Luz Murillo; Estela García; Amparo María Cotán	44.38
4×400 metre relay	Cuba (CUB); Roxana Díaz; Indira Terrero; Susana Clement; Daisurami Bonne	3:30.73	Mexico (MEX); Karla Dueñas; Nallely Vela; Gabriela Medina; Zudikey Rodríguez	3:32.96	Brazil (BRA); Sheila Ferreira; Bárbara de Oliveira; Aline dos Santos; Jailma de Lima	3:33.17
10,000 metres walk	Ana Cabecinha (POR)	43:31.21 CR	Júlia Takács (ESP)	43:35.50	Inês Henriques (POR)	44:31.27
High jump	Ruth Beitia (ESP)	1.89 m	Lesyani Mayor (CUB)	1.86 m	Romary Rifka (MEX)	1.83 m
Pole vault	Fabiana Murer (BRA)	4.85 m AR CR	Ana Piñero (ESP)	4.30 m	Karla da Silva (BRA)	4.20 m
Long jump	Concepción Montaner (ESP)	6.45 m	Vanessa Seles (BRA)	6.29 m	Eliane Martins (BRA)	6.17 m
Triple jump	Yargelis Savigne (CUB)	14.62 m	Caterine Ibargüen (COL)	14.29 m	Patricia Sarrapio (ESP)	14.10 m
Shot put	Misleydis González (CUB)	18.52 m	Natalia Duco (CHI)	17.10 m	Úrsula Ruiz (ESP)	16.97 m
Discus throw	Yarisley Collado (CUB)	60.23 m	Yarelys Barrios (CUB)	59.96 m	Elisângela Adriano (BRA)	58.86 m
Hammer throw	Jennifer Dahlgren (ARG)	70.91 m	Berta Castells (ESP)	68.37 m	Rosa Rodríguez (VEN)	67.58 m
Javelin throw	Mercedes Chilla (ESP)	62.39 m	Silvia Cruz (POR)	53.43 m	Nuria Ferrer (ESP)	51.90 m
Heptathlon	Soledad Donzino (ARG)	5459 pts	Estefania Fortes (ESP)	5406 pts	Barbara Hernando (ESP)	5314 pts

== Medal table ==
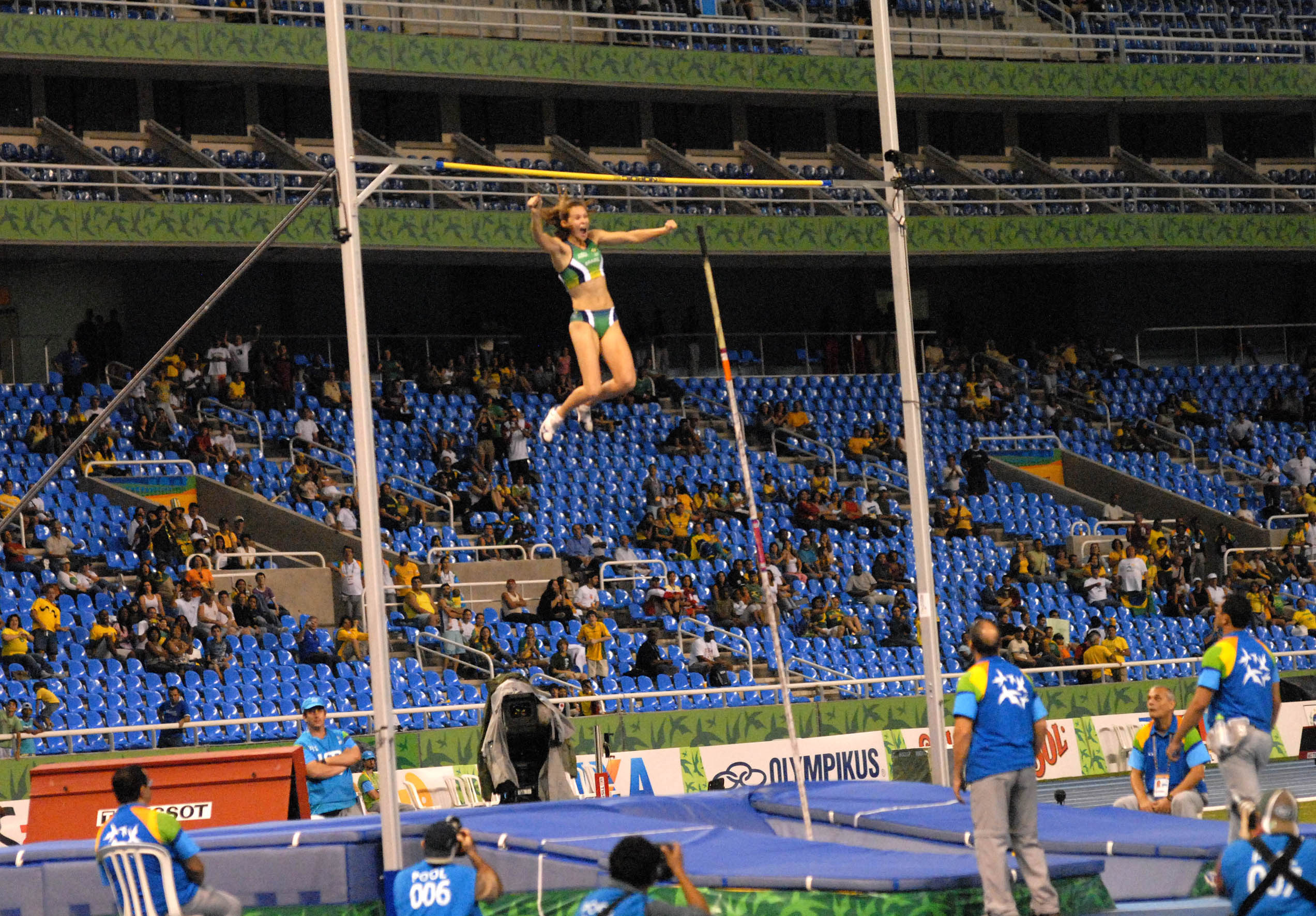
Fabiana Murer set a South American pole vault record

* Host nation (Spain)

Rank	Nation	Gold	Silver	Bronze	Total
1	Cuba	15	7	3	25
2	Spain*	11	12	9	32
3	Brazil	7	8	12	27
4	Portugal	3	3	6	12
5	Puerto Rico	3	1	2	6
6	Argentina	2	2	3	7
7	Mexico	1	1	1	3
8	Costa Rica	1	0	0	1
8	Panama	1	0	0	1
10	Colombia	0	5	4	9
11	Chile	0	2	0	2
12	Venezuela	0	1	2	3
13	Honduras	0	1	0	1
13	Paraguay	0	1	0	1
13	Uruguay	0	1	0	1
16	Dominican Republic	0	0	1	1
Totals (16 entries)		44	45	43	132

== Participating nations ==
The participation of all twenty-nine members Asociación Iberoamericana de Atletismo was a new record high for the championships. The level of athlete participation was also high: 449 athletes competed at the event, which was the second highest in history after the 1992 championships.

- Andorra (2)
- Angola (3)
- Argentina (36)
- Bolivia (2)
- Brazil (70)
- Cape Verde (5)
- Chile (15)
- Colombia (20)
- Costa Rica (4)
- Cuba (32)
- Dominican Republic (6)
- Ecuador (8)
- Equatorial Guinea (3)
- Guatemala (1)
- Guinea-Bissau (5)
- Honduras (3)
- Mexico (28)
- Mozambique (2)
- Nicaragua (2)
- Panama (3)
- Paraguay (3)
- Peru (7)
- Portugal (49)
- Puerto Rico (20)
- El Salvador (7)
- São Tomé and Príncipe (3)
- Spain (83)
- Uruguay (5)
- Venezuela (22)
