= Sítio Novo do Tocantins =

Municipality in Tocantins, Brazil

Coordinates: 5°31′S 47°28′W

- Municipality
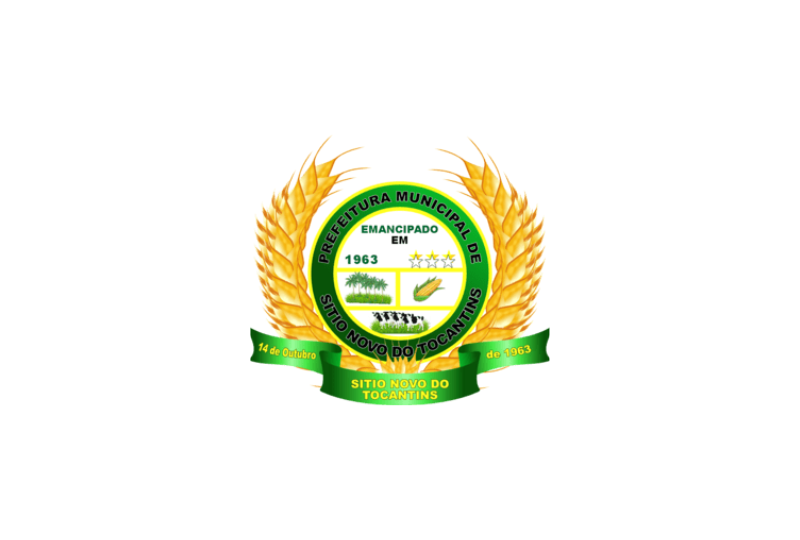
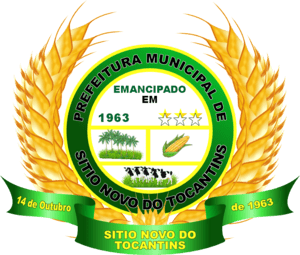
- Flag Coat of arms
- Interactive map of Sítio Novo do Tocantins
- Country: Brazil
- Region: Northern
- State: Tocantins
- Mesoregion: Ocidental do Tocantins

Population (2020)
  - Total: 8,997
- Time zone: UTC−3 (BRT)
- Website: https://sitionovodotocantins.to.gov.br/

Sítio Novo do Tocantins is a municipality in the state of Tocantins in the Northern region of Brazil.

== See also ==
- List of municipalities in Tocantins
