= Rosa Godoy =

Argentine long-distance runner

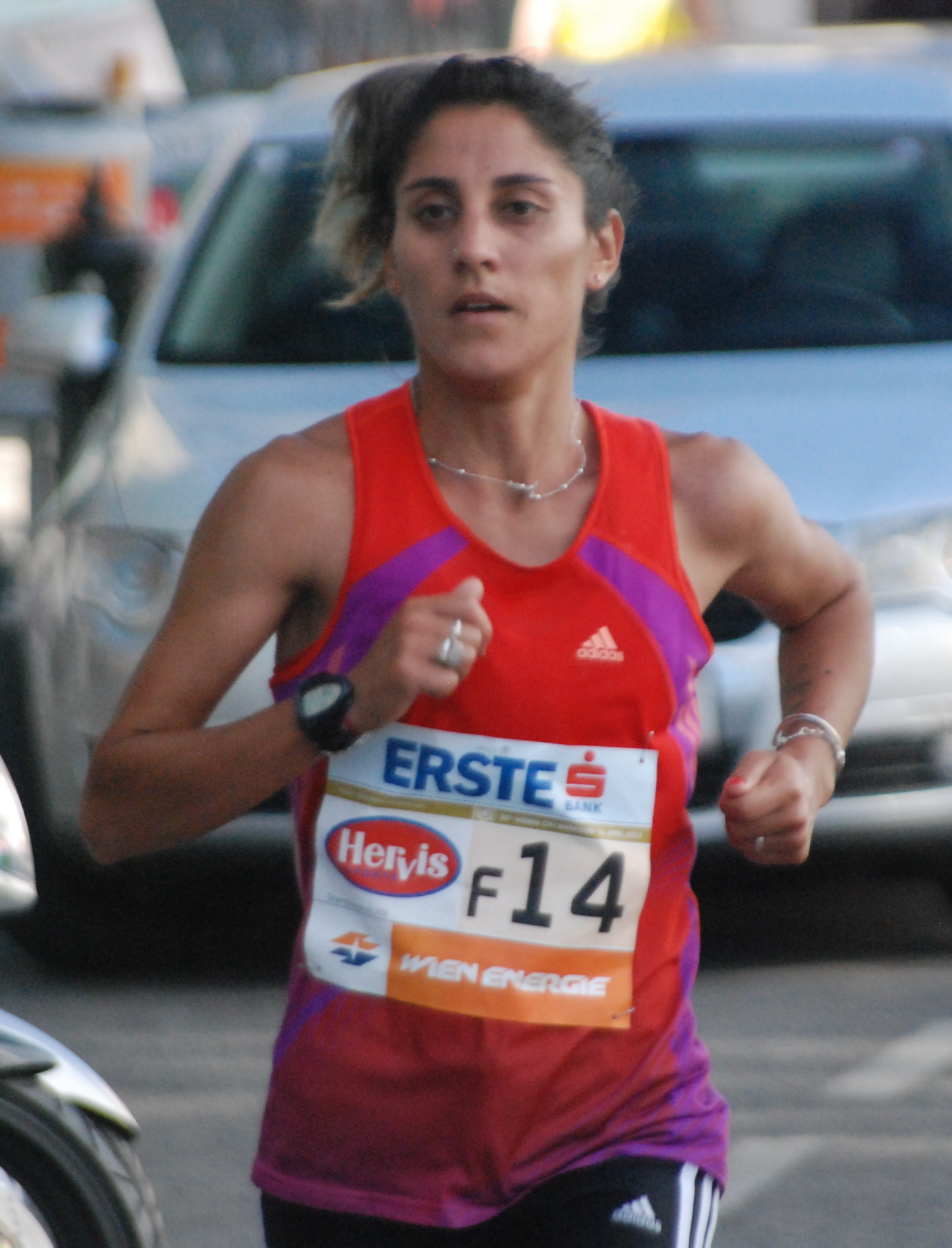
- Godoy at the 2013 Vienna City Marathon

Personal information
- Born: 19 March 1982 (age 44)
- Height: 160 cm (5 ft 3 in)
- Weight: 47 kg (104 lb)

Sport
- Sport: Track and field
- Event: 1500 m – marathon
- Coached by: Daniel Diaz (national); Martin Gonzalez (partner)

Achievements and titles
- Personal best: Marathon – 2:38:36 (2016)

Rosa Liliana Godoy (born 19 March 1982) is an Argentine runner. She placed 110th in the marathon at the 2016 Olympics. She also competed at the 2007 Pan American Games for the women's 3000 meters steeplechase.
