= Nilson André =

Brazilian sprinter (born 1986)

Nilson Andrè
Personal information
- Nationality: Brazilian
- Born: 30 January 1986 (age 40) Duque de Caxias, Rio de Janeiro
- Height: 1.72 m (5 ft 7 1/2 in)
- Weight: 70 kg (150 lb)

Sport
- Sport: Running
- Event: Sprints

Achievements and titles
- Personal best(s): 100 m: 10.18 (São Paulo 2011); 200 m: 20.41 (Rio de Janeiro 2010)
Medal record
Men's athletics
Representing Brazil
Pan American Games
Gold medal – first place	2011 Guadalajara	4×100 m
South American Championships
Gold medal – first place	2011 Buenos Aires	100 m
Gold medal – first place	2011 Buenos Aires	4×100 m
Military World Games
Gold medal – first place	2011 Rio de Janeiro	4×100 m relay
Bronze medal – third place	2011 Rio de Janeiro	100 m

Nilson de Oliveira André (born 30 January 1986) is a Brazilian track and field athlete who competes in the 100 metres and 200 metres events. He is the reigning South American champion in the 100 m and the 4×100 metres relay. He also won medals at the Military World Games in 2011.

Born in Duque de Caxias, Rio de Janeiro, he began sprinting as a schoolchild. His first international competitions came in 2003 and he won the a gold medal at the South American Junior Athletics Championships with the 4×100 metres relay team. He was a finalist in both the 100 m and 200 m at the 2003 World Youth Championships in Athletics. He won a second relay gold at the 2005 South American Junior Championships. André ran a personal best of 10.47 seconds at the Brazilian Championships in 2006, but failed to match this at the 2006 South American Games, being eliminated in the heats.

He further improved his 100 m and 200 m times in 2007 (running 10.35 and 20.77 seconds respectively), and also won his first senior medal at the 2007 South American Championships in Athletics, where he anchored home to victory the Brazilian 4×100 metres relay team of Sandro Viana, Vicente de Lima and Basílio de Morães. The following year, he took advantage of the altitude of the Julia Iriarte meeting in Cochabamba to run personal bests of 10.22 and 20.67 seconds. He won the 100 m title at the 2006 South American U23 Athletics Championships and also won the 200 m bronze medal. The highlights of his 2009 season came at the World Military Track and Field Championships, where he was a 200 m semi-finalist and won gold in the relay.

The Grande Premio Brasil Caixa de Atletismo in 2010 saw André produce personal bests of 10.21 and 20.61 seconds in the sprints, then at the 2010 Ibero-American Championships he won a 100/200 m sprint double. At the Troféu Brasil de Atletismo national event, was runner-up over 100 m and third in the 200 m. Although he did not improve upon his placings at the national event in 2011, he had a career breakthrough: he won his first individual medal at continental level at the 2011 South American Championships in Athletics, taking the 100 m gold medal, then won a second gold with the Brazilian relay team. He also reached the podium twice at the 2011 Military World Games, winning the bronze in the 100 m and gold in the relay for the host nation in Rio de Janeiro.
