= Aline dos Santos =

Brazilian sprinter (born 1985)

- Born: May 5, 1985; Rio de Janeiro
- Known for: Olympic sprinting

Aline dos Santos (born 5 May 1985 in Rio de Janeiro) is a Brazilian sprinter. She competed in the 4 × 400 m relay event at the 2012 Summer Olympics.
