= Chile at the 2025 World Athletics Championships =

- Flag of Chile
- WA code: CHI

in Tokyo, Japan 13 September 2025 – 21 September 2025
- Competitors: 14 (5 men and 9 women)
- Medals: Gold 0 Silver 0 Bronze 0 Total 0

World Athletics Championships appearances
- 1983; 1987; 1991; 1993; 1995; 1997; 1999; 2001; 2003; 2005; 2007; 2009; 2011; 2013; 2015; 2017; 2019; 2022; 2023; 2025

Chile competed at the 2025 World Athletics Championships in Tokyo, Japan, from 13 to 21 September 2025.

== Results ==
Chile entered 14 athletes to the championships: 9 women and 5 men.

Key

- Q = Qualified for the next round
- q = Qualified for the next round as a fastest loser or, in field events, by position without achieving the qualifying target
- NR = National record
- PB = Personal best
- SB = Season best
- N/A = Round not applicable for the event

=== Men ===
Track and road events

| Athlete | Event | Final | |
| Athlete | Event | Result | Rank |
|---|---|---|---|
| Ignacio Velásquez | 10,000 metres | Did not start | |
| Hugo Catrileo | Marathon | 2:23:29 | 54 |

Field events

| Athlete | Event | Qualification | | Final | |
| Athlete | Event | Distance | Position | Distance | Position |
|---|---|---|---|---|---|
| Claudio Romero | Discus throw | 60.48 | 29 | Did not start | |
| Gabriel Kehr | Hammer throw | 73.59 | 22 | Did not start | |
| Humberto Mansilla | Hammer throw | 73.34 | 23 | Did not start | |

=== Women ===
Track and road events

| Athlete | Event | Heat | | Semifinal | | Final | |
| Athlete | Event | Result | Rank | Result | Rank | Result | Rank |
|---|---|---|---|---|---|---|---|
| María Ignacia Montt | 100 metres | 11.68 | 8 | Did not advance | | | |
| Martina Weil | 400 metres | 50.61 | 2 Q | 49.88 | 4 | Did not advance | |
| Nicole Urra | Marathon | —N/a | | | | 2:58:05 | 59 |
| Macarena Borie; Anaís Hernández; Isidora Jiménez; María Ignacia Montt | 4 × 100 metres relay | 44.07 | 5 | —N/a | | Did not advance | |

Field events

| Athlete | Event | Qualification | | Final | |
| Athlete | Event | Distance | Position | Distance | Position |
|---|---|---|---|---|---|
| Ivana Xennia Gallardo | Shot put | 16.99 | 29 | Did not advance | |
