= 2019 World Athletics Championships – Men's hammer throw =

Men's hammer throw at the 2019 World Championships
- Venue: Khalifa International Stadium
- Dates: 1 October (qualification); 2 October (final)
- Competitors: 31 from 20 nations
- Winning distance: 80.50 m

Medalists
gold medal	Pawel Fajdek	Poland
silver medal	Quentin Bigot	France
bronze medal	Bence Halasz	Hungary
bronze medal	Wojciech Nowicki	Poland

The men's hammer throw at the 2019 World Athletics Championships was held at the Khalifa International Stadium in Doha, Qatar, from 1 to 2 October 2019.

== Summary ==
The finals opened with all but two already over 74 metres, three throwers over 76 metres, Eivind Henriksen, Wojciech Nowicki and Quentin Bigot; Bence Halász at 78.18m and Pawel Fajdek at 79.34m all in the first round. The second round saw the rest of the field over 74, Bigot solidifying his hold on third with a 78.06m and Fajdek improving to 80.16m. In the third, Henriksen challenged the podium with a 77.38m. It took exactly 76 metres just to get three more throws. In the fourth round Nowicki upped his challenge to 77.42m, Bigot edged into silver position with a 78.19m and then Fajdek landed the winner 80.50 m (264 ft 1 in). In the fifth round, Mykhaylo Kokhan threw a personal best 77.39m, then in the final frame, Nowicki dropped his best of 77.69m, originally not enough to get onto the podium.

However, after the competition, the Polish delegation protested the officials call on Halász in the first round, claiming his stepping outside of the circle, a foul, being missed. On further review, IAAF decided the officials acted improperly but the early call affected the rest of way Halász performed in the competition. Nowicki was awarded an additional bronze medal.

== Records ==
Before the competition records were as follows:

Record	Perf.	Athlete	Nat.	Date	Location
World	86.74	Yuriy Sedykh	URS	30 Aug 1986	Stuttgart, Germany
Championship	83.38	Szymon Ziółkowski	POL	5 Aug 2001	Edmonton, Canada
World leading	81.74	Wojciech Nowicki	POL	2 Jul 2019	Poznań, Poland
African	81.27	Mostafa El Gamel	EGY	21 Mar 2014	Cairo, Egyptz
Asian	84.86	Koji Murofushi	JPN	29 Jun 2003	Prague, Czech Republic
NACAC	82.52	Lance Deal	USA	7 Sep 1996	Milan, Italy
South American	78.63	Wagner Domingos	BRA	19 Jun 2016	Celje, Slovenia
European	86.74	Yuriy Sedykh	URS	30 Aug 1986	Stuttgart, Germany
Oceanian	79.29	Stuart Rendell	AUS	6 Jul 2002	Varaždin, Croatia

== Schedule ==
The event schedule, in local time (UTC+3), was as follows:

Date	Time	Round
1 October	16:30	Qualification
2 October	21:40	Final

== Results ==
=== Qualification ===
Qualification: Qualifying Performance 76.50 (Q) or at least 12 best performers (q) advanced to the final.

Rank	Group	Name	Nationality	Round			Mark	Notes
Rank	Group	Name	Nationality	1	2	3	Mark	Notes
1	B	Paweł Fajdek	Poland	79.24			79.24	Q
2	A	Wojciech Nowicki	Poland	77.89			77.89	Q
3	A	Quentin Bigot	France	77.44			77.44	Q
4	B	Rudy Winkler	United States	76.00	74.03	77.06	77.06	Q, PB
5	A	Javier Cienfuegos	Spain	74.87	75.06	76.90	76.90	Q
6	B	Bence Halász	Hungary	76.90			76.90	Q
7	B	Mykhaylo Kokhan	Ukraine	x	76.56		76.56	Q
8	B	Eivind Henriksen	Norway	76.21	75.48	76.46	76.46	q
9	A	Yevgeniy Korotovskiy	Authorised Neutral Athletes	74.96	75.90	76.36	76.36	q
10	A	Nick Miller	Great Britain & N.I.	x	76.36	x	76.36	q
11	A	Hleb Dudarau	Belarus	71.74	75.38	76.28	76.28	q
12	A	Ashraf Amgad El-Seify	Qatar	72.38	76.22	x	76.22	q, SB
13	B	Michail Anastasakis	Greece	72.75	73.62	75.07	75.07	
14	A	Conor McCullough	United States	74.26	74.88	72.82	74.88	
15	B	Zakhar Makhrosenka	Belarus	71.74	73.08	74.80	74.80	
16	B	Serghei Marghiev	Moldova	74.15	74.25	74.28	74.28	
17	A	Gabriel Kehr	Chile	73.99	73.80	71.79	73.99	
18	B	Marcel Lomnický	Slovakia	73.51	73.01	x	73.51	
19	B	Denis Lukyanov	Authorised Neutral Athletes	71.41	71.93	73.47	73.47	
20	B	Özkan Baltaci	Turkey	73.19	72.68	x	73.19	
21	A	Diego del Real	Mexico	71.90	73.15	71.62	73.15	
22	A	Krisztián Pars	Hungary	72.69	72.36	73.05	73.05	
23	A	Christos Frantzeskakis	Greece	72.96	x	72.81	72.96	
24	A	Daniel Haugh	United States	x	68.52	72.85	72.85	
25	B	Humberto Mansilla	Chile	71.71	x	72.68	72.68	
26	B	Roberto Sawyers	Costa Rica	x	70.58	72.41	72.41	
27	A	Serhiy Perevoznikov	Ukraine	x	72.16	71.26	72.16	
28	B	Alberto González	Spain	71.69	71.59	x	71.69	
29	B	Serhiy Reheda	Ukraine	x	x	71.28	71.28	
30	A	Mostafa El Gamel	Egypt	68.99	70.45	68.16	70.45	
31	A	Joaquín Gómez	Argentina	70.07	70.17	68.40	70.17	

=== Final ===
The final was started on 2 October at 21:40.

Rank	Name	Nationality	Round						Mark	Notes
Rank	Name	Nationality	1	2	3	4	5	6	Mark	Notes
1st place, gold medalist(s)	Paweł Fajdek	Poland	79.34	80.16	79.37	80.50	x	x	80.50	
2nd place, silver medalist(s)	Quentin Bigot	France	76.34	78.06	77.89	78.19	x	74.87	78.19	SB
3rd place, bronze medalist(s)	Bence Halász	Hungary	78.18	x	x	x	73.76	x	78.18	
3rd place, bronze medalist(s)	Wojciech Nowicki	Poland	76.25	76.50	x	77.42	x	77.69	77.69	
5	Mykhaylo Kokhan	Ukraine	74.52	72.58	75.83	76.21	77.39	76.50	77.39	PB
6	Eivind Henriksen	Norway	76.03	x	77.38	x	75.36	77.07	77.38	
7	Javier Cienfuegos	Spain	73.25	74.73	76.00	76.57	76.01	74.64	76.57	
8	Hleb Dudarau	Belarus	75.45	74.36	76.00	74.30	74.46	75.34	76.00	
9	Ashraf Amgad El-Seify	Qatar	75.28	75.41	75.09				75.41	
10	Nick Miller	Great Britain & N.I.	75.31	x	x				75.31	
11	Rudy Winkler	United States	74.42	75.20	73.47				75.20	
12	Yevgeniy Korotovskiy	Authorised Neutral Athletes	x	74.64	75.14				75.14	
