= Athletics at the 2019 Pan American Games – Men's hammer throw =

Men's hammer throw at the 2019 Pan American Games
- Venue: Athletics Stadium
- Dates: August 8
- Competitors: 11 from 7 nations
- Winning distance: 74.98

Medalists
Gold medal	Gabriel Kehr	Chile
Silver medal	Humberto Mansilla	Chile
Bronze medal	Sean Donnelly	United States

The men's hammer throw competition of the athletics events at the 2019 Pan American Games took place on the 8th of August at the 2019 Pan American Games Athletics Stadium. The defending Pan American Games champion was Kibwe Johnson from the United States.

== Records ==
Prior to this competition, the existing world and Pan American Games records were as follows:

World record	Yuriy Sedykh (URS)	86.74	Stuttgart, West Germany	August 30, 1986
Pan American Games record	Kibwe Johnson (USA)	79.63	Guadalajara, Mexico	October 26, 2011

== Schedule ==
Date	Time	Round
August 8, 2019	14:30	Final

== Results ==
All times shown are in meters.

KEY:	q	Fastest non-qualifiers	Q	Qualified	NR	National record	PB	Personal best	SB	Seasonal best	DQ	Disqualified

=== Final ===
The results were as follows:

Rank	Name	Nationality	#1	#2	#3	#4	#5	#6	Time	Notes
1st place, gold medalist(s)	Gabriel Kehr	Chile	74.50	74.98	73.88	x	72.85	74.00	74.98	
2nd place, silver medalist(s)	Humberto Mansilla	Chile	x	69.68	71.73	x	74.38	72.90	74.38	
3rd place, bronze medalist(s)	Sean Donnelly	United States	x	70.41	74.23	73.62	x	72.79	74.23	
4	Diego del Real	Mexico	66.78	71.57	x	71.69	74.16	73.98	74.16	
5	Joaquín Gómez	Argentina	69.19	71.27	71.86	73.06	70.79	73.92	73.92	SB
6	Allan Wolski	Brazil	70.84	70.91	70.37	69.76	x	73.25	73.25	
7	Roberto Janet	Cuba	70.30	71.56	71.19	69.54	70.73	71.93	71.93	
8	Rudy Winkler	United States	x	71.84	71.04	x	x	71.29	71.84	SB
9	Roberto Sawyers	Costa Rica	70.25	64.60	69.98				70.25	
10	Reinier Mejías	Cuba	x	67.50	x				67.50	
11	José Manuel Padilla	Mexico	64.21	66.40	62.63				66.40	
