= Chile at the 2022 World Athletics Championships =

- Flag of Chile
- WA code: CHI
- National federation: Chilean Athletics Federation
- Website: www.fedachi.cl

in Eugene, United States 15–24 July 2022
- Competitors: 6 (4 men and 2 women) in 4 events
- Medals: Gold 0 Silver 0 Bronze 0 Total 0

World Athletics Championships appearances
- 1983; 1987; 1991; 1993; 1995; 1997; 1999; 2001; 2003; 2005; 2007; 2009; 2011; 2013; 2015; 2017; 2019; 2022; 2023; 2025

Chile competed at the 2022 World Athletics Championships in Eugene, Oregon from 15 to 24 July 2022. Chile had entered 6 athletes.

== Results ==
Key

- Q = Qualified for the next round
- q = Not qualified for the next round as a fastest loser or, in field events, by position without achieving the qualifying target
- NR = National record
- PB = Personal best
- SB = Season best
- N/A = Round not applicable for the event

=== Men ===
Field events

Athlete	Event	Qualification		Final	
Athlete	Event	Distance	Position	Distance	Position
Claudio Romero	Discus throw	61.69	20	Did not advance	
Lucas Nervi	Discus throw	NM		Did not advance	
Humberto Mansilla	Hammer throw	75.33	11 q	73.91	10
Gabriel Kehr	Hammer throw	DNS		Did not advance	

=== Women ===
Field events

Athlete	Event	Qualification		Final	
Athlete	Event	Distance	Position	Distance	Position
Ivana Gallardo	Shot put	16.20	27	Did not advance	
Karen Gallardo	Discus throw	57.78	22	Did not advance	
