= Roberto Janet =

Cuban hammer thrower (born 1986)

Personal information
- Full name: Roberto Janet Durruty
- Born: August 29, 1986 (age 39) Santiago de Cuba
- Height: 1.87 m (6 ft 2 in)
- Weight: 95 kg (209 lb)

Sport
- Country: Cuba
- Sport: Athletics
- Event: Hammer throw
Medal record
Ibero-American Championships
Gold medal – first place	2010 San Fernando	Hammer throw
Gold medal – first place	2012 Barquisimeto	Hammer throw
CAC Championships
Gold medal – first place	2009 Havana	Hammer throw
Gold medal – first place	2011 Mayagüez	Hammer throw
- Updated on 27 December 2014

Roberto Janet Durruty (born 29 August 1986) is a Cuban track and field athlete who competes in the hammer throw. He has a personal best of 78.02 metres, set in 2015. He is a two-time champion at the Central American and Caribbean Championships in Athletics and the Ibero-American Championships in Athletics. He represented Cuba at the 2011 Pan American Games and the 2012 Summer Olympics, as well as the 2013 and 2015 Athletics World Championships.

== Life and career ==
Born in Santiago de Cuba Province, Janet began competing internationally in 2005 and was runner-up to Boldizsar Kocsor at the 2005 Pan American Junior Athletics Championships. He also came sixth at the 2005 ALBA Games. He set a best of 68.43 metres the following year and placed third at the 2006 NACAC Under-23 Championships in Athletics. His 2007 season was highlighted by a throw of 70.89 m (his first over seventy metres) at the Aurelio Janet Memorial. He continued this form into 2008 and improved to 71.92 metres.

Janet reached the top of the national scene in 2009 and won the Barrientos Memorial with a throw of 73.17 m. A personal best of 74.95 m preceded his first major win at the 2009 Central American and Caribbean Championships in Athletics, where he beat Cuban rival Noleysi Bicet. He won again at the Barriento Memorial in 2010 and a clearance of 75.98 m, continuing his upward trajectory. His second international title came at the 2010 Ibero-American Championships in Athletics as he broke Juan Ignacio Cerra's six-year dominance of the competition. He was chosen to represent the Americas at the 2010 IAAF Continental Cup and finished in fifth place overall.

Janet's progress stalled in 2011, as his seasonal best of 76.40 m was slightly short of his lifetime best. However, he performed well in international competition, defending his title at the 2011 CAC Championships and placed fifth at the Pan American Games. He won the 2012 Cuban Championships with a then personal best throw of 77.08 m. He won his second gold medal at the 2012 Ibero-American Championships and also won at the IAAF Centenary meet in Havana. He was selected for the Cuban team for the 2012 London Olympics but did not reach the final.

In 2013 he qualified for his first World Championships but did not reach the final.

2015 was better for him; he set a new personal best and reached the final of the 2015 World Championships.

== Personal best ==
- Hammer throw: 78.02 m – Havana, Cuba, 28 May 2015

== Achievements ==
Year	Competition	Venue	Position	Event	Notes
Representing Cuba
2005	ALBA Games	Havana, Cuba	6th	Hammer throw	61.30 m
2005	Pan American Junior Championships	Windsor, Canada	2nd	Hammer throw (6 kg)	66.76 m
2006	NACAC Under-23 Championships	Santo Domingo, Dominican Republic	3rd	Hammer throw	66.28 m
2009	ALBA Games	Havana, Cuba	2nd	Hammer throw	70.66 m
2009	Central American and Caribbean Championships	Havana, Cuba	1st	Hammer throw	73.80 m
2010	Ibero-American Championships	San Fernando, Spain	1st	Hammer throw	73.82 m
2010	Continental Cup	Split, Croatia	5th	Hammer throw	74.87 m
2011	Central American and Caribbean Championships	Mayagüez, Puerto Rico	1st	Hammer throw	71.65 m
2011	Pan American Games	Guadalajara, Mexico	5th	Hammer throw	69.46 m A
2012	Ibero-American Championships	Barquisimeto, Venezuela	1st	Hammer throw	72.74 m
2012	Olympic Games	London, United Kingdom	19th (q)	Hammer throw	73.34 m
2013	World Championships	Moscow, Russia	23rd (q)	Hammer throw	71.73 m
2014	Pan American Sports Festival	Mexico City, Mexico	1st	Hammer throw	73.94m A
2014	Continental Cup	Marrakesh, Morocco	6th	Hammer throw	71.98 m
2014	Central American and Caribbean Games	Xalapa, Mexico	1st	Hammer throw	74.11 m A
2015	Pan American Games	Toronto, Canada	2nd	Hammer throw	74.78 m
2015	NACAC Championships	San José, Costa Rica	1st	Hammer throw	72.72 m
2015	World Championships	Beijing, China	12th	Hammer throw	72.50 m
2016	Olympic Games	Rio de Janeiro, Brazil	14th (q)	Hammer throw	73.23 m
2018	Central American and Caribbean Games	Barranquilla, Colombia	3rd	Hammer throw	73.11 m
2019	Pan American Games	Lima, Peru	7th	Hammer throw	71.93 m
