= Chile at the 2023 World Athletics Championships =

- Flag of Chile
- WA code: CHI

in Budapest, Hungary 19 August 2023 – 27 August 2023
- Competitors: 9 (6 men and 3 women)
- Medals: Gold 0 Silver 0 Bronze 0 Total 0

World Athletics Championships appearances
- 1983; 1987; 1991; 1993; 1995; 1997; 1999; 2001; 2003; 2005; 2007; 2009; 2011; 2013; 2015; 2017; 2019; 2022; 2023

Chile competed at the 2023 World Athletics Championships in Budapest, Hungary, from 19 to 27 August 2023.

== Results ==
Chile entered 9 athletes.

Key

- Q = Qualified for the next round
- q = Qualified for the next round as a fastest loser or, in field events, by position without achieving the qualifying target
- NR = National record
- PB = Personal best
- SB = Season best
- N/A = Round not applicable for the event

=== Men ===
Track and road events

Athlete	Event	Final	
Athlete	Event	Result	Rank
Carlos Díaz	10,000 metres	DNF	

Field events

Athlete	Event	Qualification		Final	
Athlete	Event	Distance	Position	Distance	Position
Luis Reyes	Triple jump	15.75	28	Did not advance	
Lucas Nervi	Discus throw	58.76	32	Did not advance	
Claudio Romero	Discus throw	62.24	23	Did not advance	
Gabriel Kehr	Hammer throw	75.10	10 q	75.99	9
Humberto Mansilla	Hammer throw	72.80	20	Did not advance	

=== Women ===
Track and road events

Athlete	Event	Heat		Semifinal		Final	
Athlete	Event	Result	Rank	Result	Rank	Result	Rank
Martina Weil	400 metres	51.35	4	Did not advance			

Field events

Athlete	Event	Qualification		Final	
Athlete	Event	Distance	Position	Distance	Position
Ivana Gallardo	Shot put	16.55	30	Did not advance	
Karen Gallardo	Discus throw	56.74	27	Did not advance	
