= Athletics at the 2011 Pan American Games – Men's hammer throw =

Men's hammer throw at the 2011 Pan American Games
- Venue: Telmex Athletics Stadium
- Dates: October 26
- Competitors: 12 from 9 nations

Medalists
Gold medal	Kibwe Johnson	United States
Silver medal	Michael Mai	United States
Bronze medal	Noleysis Vicet	Cuba

The men's hammer throw event of the athletics events at the 2011 Pan American Games was held on the 26 of October at the Telmex Athletics Stadium. The defending Pan American Games champion is James Steacy of Canada.

== Records ==
Prior to this competition, the existing world and Pan American Games records were as follows:

World record	Yuriy Sedykh (URS)	86.74	Stuttgart, West Germany	August 30, 1986
Pan American Games record	Lance Deal (USA)	79.61	Winnipeg, Canada	July 27, 1999

== Qualification ==
Each National Olympic Committee (NOC) was able to enter up to two entrants providing they had met the minimum standard (62.00) in the qualifying period (January 1, 2010 to September 14, 2011).

== Schedule ==
Date	Time	Round
October 26, 2011	14:30	Final

== Results ==
All distances shown are in meters:centimeters

KEY:	q	Fastest non-qualifiers	Q	Qualified	NR	National record	PB	Personal best	SB	Seasonal best

=== Final ===
The final was held on October 26.

Rank	Athlete	Nationality	#1	#2	#3	#4	#5	#6	Result	Notes
1st place, gold medalist(s)	Kibwe Johnson	United States	73.87	77.24	76.56	76.82	79.63	77.19	79.63	PR
2nd place, silver medalist(s)	Michael Mai	United States	68.61	70.62	68.95	70.44	72.71	68.92	72.71	
3rd place, bronze medalist(s)	Noleysi Vicet	Cuba	69.68	70.68	72.57	71.56	72.02	72.03	72.57	
4	Wagner Domingos	Brazil	x	67.97	70.16	x	68.79	69.08	70.16	
5	Roberto Janet	Cuba	x	69.46	66.62	x	x	x	69.46	
6	Juan Ignacio Cerra	Argentina	x	65.16	65.08	66.26	66.80	66.37	66.80	
7	Roberto Sawyers	Costa Rica	x	65.09	x	x	x	64.91	65.09	
8	Aldo Bello	Venezuela	x	60.54	62.50	63.46	62.55	62.22	63.46	SB
9	Diego Berrios	Guatemala	x	60.82	57.76				60.82	
10	Diego Alan del Real	Mexico	55.16	59.41	x				59.41	
11	Edgar Florian	Guatemala	54.03	58.63	58.92				58.92	
12	Michael Letterlough	Cayman Islands	55.21	57.72	x				57.72	
