= Athletics at the 2015 Pan American Games – Men's hammer throw =

Men's hammer throw at the 2015 Pan American Games
- Venue: CIBC Pan Am and Parapan Am Athletics Stadium
- Dates: July 22
- Competitors: 10 from 7 nations
- Winning distance: 75.46

Medalists
Gold medal	Kibwe Johnson	United States
Silver medal	Roberto Janet	Cuba
Bronze medal	Conor McCullough	United States

The men's hammer throw competition of the athletics events at the 2015 Pan American Games took place on July 22 at the CIBC Pan Am and Parapan Am Athletics Stadium. The defending Pan American Games champion is Kibwe Johnson of the United States.

== Records ==
Prior to this competition, the existing world and Pan American Games records were as follows:

World record	Yuriy Sedykh (URS)	86.74	Stuttgart, West Germany	August 30, 1986
Pan American Games record	Kibwe Johnson (USA)	79.63	Guadalajara, Mexico	October 26, 2011

== Qualification ==
Each National Olympic Committee (NOC) was able to enter up to two entrants providing they had met the minimum standard (63.15) in the qualifying period (January 1, 2014 to June 28, 2015).

== Schedule ==
Date	Time	Round
July 22, 2015	20:03	Final

== Results ==
All results shown are in meters.

KEY:	q	Best non-qualifiers	Q	Qualified	NR	National record	PB	Personal best	SB	Seasonal best	DQ	Disqualified

=== Final ===
Rank	Name	Nationality	#1	#2	#3	#4	#5	#6	Mark	Notes
1st place, gold medalist(s)	Kibwe Johnson	United States	72.17	x	x	72.40	75.46	x	75.46	
2nd place, silver medalist(s)	Roberto Janet	Cuba	71.15	74.78	73.57	x	x	73.99	74.78	
3rd place, bronze medalist(s)	Conor McCullough	United States	69.93	73.74	73.19	71.61	x	72.55	73.74	
4	Wagner Domingos	Brazil	x	71.71	x	73.74	x	x	73.74	
5	Allan Wolski	Brazil	69.77	70.69	x	70.15	x	72.72	72.72	
6	Diego del Real	Mexico	x	68.43	71.72	71.74	x	70.08	71.74	
7	Roberto Sawyers	Costa Rica	66.17	68.34	67.84	69.51	70.95	68.06	70.95	
8	James Steacy	Canada	69.37	x	x	69.55	68.00	69.75	69.75	
9	Reinier Mejias	Cuba	67.76	x	x				67.76	
10	Humberto Mansilla	Chile	65.21	66.14	66.03				66.14	
