= Canoeing at the 2015 Pan American Games – Qualification =

== Qualification systems ==
A quota of 160 canoers (40 slalom and 120 sprint) will be allowed to qualify. Both slalom and sprint will have one qualification event each at the Pan American Olympic Festival, where a specific number of boats per event will qualify. For the sprint events a total of three athlete quotas have been reserved for nations that have not qualified an athlete. A nation may enter a maximum of six male kayakers, four male canoers, five female kayakers, and one female canoer. A maximum of fifteen athletes can compete for a nation in sprint, while a maximum of six can compete in slalom. In slalom nations may choose to have the same athlete in the same event, reducing the number of athletes from forty. The remaining quotas (after teams select their squads) in sprint will be reallocated to countries not already qualified. The host nation (Canada) is guaranteed participation in each event, granted it partakes in the qualification events. Countries qualifying athletes in the K-1 and C-1 slalom events for men but not the C-2 event may compete in the C-2 event using athletes qualified in the first two events.

== Qualification summary ==
| NOC | Slalom | | | | | Sprint | | | | | | | | | | | | | Total | |
| NOC | Men | | | Women | | Men | | | | | | | | Women | | | | | Boats | Athletes |
| NOC | K1 | C1 | C2 | K1 | C1 | K1 200 | K2 200 | K1 1000 | K2 1000 | K4 1000 | C1 200 | C1 1000 | C2 1000 | K1 200 | K1 500 | K2 500 | K4 500 | C1 200 | Boats | Athletes |
|---|---|---|---|---|---|---|---|---|---|---|---|---|---|---|---|---|---|---|---|---|
| Argentina | X | X | X | X | X | X | X | X | X | X | | | | X | X | | X | | 13 | 17 |
| Brazil | X | X | X | X | X | X | X | X | X | X | X | X | | | X | | X | X | 15 | 20 |
| Canada | X | X | X | X | X | X | X | X | X | X | X | X | X | X | X | X | X | X | 18 | 21 |
| Chile | X | | | X | | | | | | X | | X | X | X | | | | X | 7 | 10 |
| Colombia | X | X | | | | X | | | | | | X | | X | X | X | X | | 8 | 8 |
| Costa Rica | X | X | | | | | | | | | | | | | | | | | 2 | 2 |
| Cuba | | | | | | | | X | X | X | X | X | X | X | X | X | X | X | 11 | 15 |
| Dominican Republic | | | | | | | | | | | X | X | | | | | | | 2 | 1 |
| Ecuador | | | | | | X | | | | | X | | | X | X | | | X | 5 | 5 |
| Guatemala | | | | | | X | | X | | | | | | | | | | | 2 | 1 |
| Mexico | X | X | | X | | X | X | X | X | X | | X | X | | | X | X | X | 13 | 18 |
| Paraguay | | | | X | X | | | | | | | | | | | | | | 2 | 2 |
| Peru | | | | | | | | | | | | | | | | | | X | 1 | 1 |
| Puerto Rico | | | | | | | | | | | | | | | | X | | | 1 | 2 |
| United States | X | X | X | X | X | X | X | | | | | | | X | X | X | X | X | 12 | 14 |
| Uruguay | | | | | | | X | | | X | | | | | | | | | 2 | 6 |
| Venezuela | X | X | X | X | | | X | | | X | X | | X | | | | X | | 9 | 18 |
| Total: 17 NOCs | 9 | 8 | 5 | 8 | 5 | 8 | 7 | 6 | 5 | 8 | 6 | 6 | 5 | 7 | 7 | 6 | 8 | 8 | | 160 |

- Nations may enter boats in any of the sprint events, granted they have enough quotas for that discipline.

== Slalom ==
=== Qualification timeline ===
| Event | Date | Venue |
|---|---|---|
| 2014 Pan American Sports Festival | July 11–13, 2014 | Huauchinango, Mexico |

=== Qualification table ===
| Event | K1 Men | C1 Men | C2 Men | K1 Women | C1 Women |
|---|---|---|---|---|---|
| Pan American Olympic Festival | Brazil; Argentina; Canada; United States; Venezuela; Costa Rica; Colombia; Mexico; Chile | Brazil; Argentina; United States; Venezuela; Canada; Mexico; Colombia; Costa Rica | Brazil; Argentina; United States; Venezuela; Canada | Brazil; Argentina; Canada; United States; Paraguay; Mexico; Venezuela; Chile | Brazil; Paraguay; United States; Argentina; Canada |
| Total 10 NOC's | 9 | 8 | 5 | 8 | 5 |

== Sprint ==
17 countries took part in qualification races. Out of those 17, ten managed to qualify a single quota. The remaining seven who competed (Barbados, Dominican Republic, Guatemala, Nicaragua, Puerto Rico, Trinidad and Tobago and Uruguay) were eligible for the three remaining quotas reserved for countries not having any quotas at the qualification event. However the results of the Pan American Championships were used instead to determine the wildcards, with two of the previously nations not qualified (Guatemala and Dominican Republic) receiving a quota, along with the United States in the women's canoe event.

- Argentina had qualified ten male kayakers and six female kayakers (the maximum allowed is six for male and five for female), this created a further five athlete quotas.
- Canada had qualified 23 athletes, with the maximum being 15 athletes. This created a further eight athlete quotas.
- Cuba has qualified eight female athletes (with a maximum allowing for five female). This created an additional three athlete quotas.
- Mexico has qualified ten male kayakers and six female kayakers (the maximum allowed is six for male and five for female), this created an additional five athlete quotas.
- A minimum total of 21 athlete quotas had to be redistributed.

=== Qualification timeline ===
| Event | Date | Venue |
|---|---|---|
| 2014 Pan American Sports Festival | September 4–7, 2014 | Mexico City, Mexico |

=== Men's K1 200m ===
| Competition | Vacancies | Qualified |
|---|---|---|
| 2014 Pan American Championship | 4 | Argentina; Ecuador; Brazil; Mexico |
| Host nation | 1 | Canada |
| Reallocation | 2 | Colombia; United States |
| Wildcard | 1 | Guatemala |
| TOTAL | 8 | |

=== Men's K2 200m ===
| Competition | Vacancies | Qualified |
|---|---|---|
| 2014 Pan American Championship | 4 | Argentina; Brazil; Mexico; Venezuela |
| Host nation | 1 | Canada |
| Reallocation | 2 | United States; Uruguay |
| TOTAL | 7 | |

=== Men's K1 1000m ===
| Competition | Vacancies | Qualified |
|---|---|---|
| 2014 Pan American Championship | 5 | Cuba; Brazil; Argentina; Mexico; Canada |
| Wildcard | 1 | Guatemala |
| TOTAL | 6 | |

=== Men's K2 1000m ===
| Competition | Vacancies | Qualified |
|---|---|---|
| 2014 Pan American Championship | 4 | Cuba; Argentina; Mexico; Brazil |
| Host nation | 1 | Canada |
| TOTAL | 5 | |

=== Men's K4 1000m ===
| Competition | Vacancies | Qualified |
|---|---|---|
| 2014 Pan American Championship | 4 | Argentina; Mexico; Venezuela; Chile |
| Host nation | 1 | Canada |
| Reallocation | 3 | Brazil; Cuba; Uruguay |
| TOTAL | 8 | |

=== Men's C1 200m ===
| Competition | Vacancies | Qualified |
|---|---|---|
| 2014 Pan American Championship | 4 | Brazil; Cuba; Venezuela; Ecuador |
| Host nation | 1 | Canada |
| Wildcard | 1 | Dominican Republic |
| TOTAL | 6 | |

=== Men's C1 1000m ===
| Competition | Vacancies | Qualified |
|---|---|---|
| 2014 Pan American Championship | 4 | Brazil; Cuba; Colombia; Mexico |
| Host nation | 1 | Canada |
| Wildcard | 1 | Dominican Republic |
| TOTAL | 6 | |

=== Men's C2 1000m ===
| Competition | Vacancies | Qualified |
|---|---|---|
| 2014 Pan American Championship | 4 | Cuba; Mexico; Chile; Venezuela |
| Host nation | 1 | Canada |
| TOTAL | 5 | |

=== Women's K1 200m ===
| Competition | Vacancies | Qualified |
|---|---|---|
| 2014 Pan American Championship | 5 | Cuba; Argentina; Canada; Colombia; United States |
| Reallocation | 2 | Chile; Ecuador |
| TOTAL | 7 | |

=== Women's K1 500m ===
| Competition | Vacancies | Qualified |
|---|---|---|
| 2014 Pan American Championship | 5 | Cuba; United States; Brazil; Argentina; Colombia |
| Host nation | 1 | Canada |
| Reallocation | 1 | Ecuador |
| TOTAL | 7 | |

=== Women's K2 500m ===
| Competition | Vacancies | Qualified |
|---|---|---|
| 2014 Pan American Championship | 5 | Cuba; Colombia; United States; Mexico; Canada |
| Reallocation | 1 | Puerto Rico |
| TOTAL | 6 | |

=== Women's K4 500m ===
| Competition | Vacancies | Qualified |
|---|---|---|
| 2014 Pan American Championship | 5 | Cuba; Argentina; Mexico; Brazil; Canada |
| Reallocation | 3 | Colombia; United States; Venezuela |
| TOTAL | 8 | |

=== Women's C1 200m ===
| Competition | Vacancies | Qualified |
|---|---|---|
| 2014 Pan American Championship | 6 | Brazil; Ecuador; Canada; Chile; Mexico; Cuba |
| Wildcard | 2 | United States; Peru |
| TOTAL | 8 | |
