= 2014 World Junior Championships in Athletics – Men's hammer throw =

2014 junior hammer throw championship

The men's hammer throw event at the 2014 World Junior Championships in Athletics was held in Eugene, Oregon, USA, at Hayward Field on 24 and 25 July. A 6 kg (junior implement) hammer was used.

== Medalists ==
Gold	Ashraf Amgad Elseify; Qatar
Silver	Bence Pásztor; Hungary
Bronze	Ilya Terentyev; Russia

== Results ==
=== Final ===
25 July
Start time: 17:59 Temperature: 28 °C Humidity: 33 %
End time: 19:13 Temperature: 27 °C Humidity: 37 %

Rank	Name	Nationality	Attempts						Result	Notes
Rank	Name	Nationality	1	2	3	4	5	6	Result	Notes
1st place, gold medalist(s)	Ashraf Amgad Elseify	Qatar	81.82	84.51	83.39	82.87	84.71	81.56	84.71	WJL
2nd place, silver medalist(s)	Bence Pásztor	Hungary	76.61	79.14	76.77	x	77.36	79.99	79.99	
3rd place, bronze medalist(s)	Ilya Terentyev	Russia	x	76.31	x	x	x	x	76.31	
4	Alexei Mikhailov	Germany	69.42	5.74	74.11	75.88	73.95	73.36	75.88	PB
5	Matija Gregurić	Croatia	x	71.14	75.09	75.71	x	x	75.71	
6	Igor Evseev	Russia	67.94	74.65	x	x	70.55	71.19	74.65	
7	Maksim Mitskou	Belarus	73.12	71.67	x	73.93	74.11	72.12	74.11	
8	Joaquín Gómez	Argentina	64.85	73.36	71.64	67.30	x	73.67	73.67	
9	Taylor Campbell	United Kingdom	70.38	x	73.12				73.12	
10	Tshepang Makhethe	South Africa	70.54	72.36	72.94				72.94	
11	Denzel Comenentia	Netherlands	x	68.65	x				68.65	
	Hilmar Örn Jónsson	Iceland	x	x	x				NM	

=== Qualifications ===
24 July
With qualifying standard of 74.50 (Q) or at least the 12 best performers (q) advance to the Final

==== Summary ====
Rank	Name	Nationality	Result	Notes
1	Bence Pásztor	Hungary	79.26	Q
2	Ashraf Amgad Elseify	Qatar	77.65	Q
3	Hilmar Örn Jónsson	Iceland	76.03	Q NJR
4	Joaquín Gómez	Argentina	75.77	Q AJR
5	Ilya Terentyev	Russia	75.39	Q
6	Alexei Mikhailov	Germany	74.89	Q PB
7	Matija Gregurić	Croatia	74.28	q
8	Denzel Comenentia	Netherlands	73.11	q
9	Tshepang Makhethe	South Africa	72.99	q
10	Taylor Campbell	United Kingdom	72.87	q
11	Igor Evseev	Russia	72.52	q
12	Maksim Mitskou	Belarus	72.38	q
13	Tolgahan Yavuz	Turkey	72.27	
14	Bence Halász	Hungary	71.95	
15	Ahmed Amgad Elsify	Qatar	71.69	PB
16	Humberto Mansilla	Chile	71.28	
17	Raman Zholudzeu	Belarus	70.73	
18	Markus Kokkonen	Finland	70.47	
19	Artem Poleshko	Ukraine	69.96	
20	Charles Ionata	United States	69.93	PB
21	Gabriel Kehr	Chile	69.84	PB
22	Kevin Arreaga	Spain	69.65	
23	Matthew Denny	Australia	69.16	
24	Clarence Gallop	United States	65.95	
25	Costa Kousparis	Australia	65.93	
26	Miguel Alberto Blanco	Spain	62.67	
	Volodymyr Myslyvchuk	Ukraine	DNS	

==== Details ====
With qualifying standard of 74.50 (Q) or at least the 12 best performers (q) advance to the Final

===== Group A =====
25 July
Start time; 10:30 Temperature: 16 °C Humidity: 68 %
End time: 11:09 Temperature: 20 °C Humidity: 56 %

Rank	Name	Nationality	Attempts			Result	Notes
Rank	Name	Nationality	1	2	3	Result	Notes
1	Ashraf Amgad Elseify	Qatar	77.65			77.65	Q
2	Hilmar Örn Jónsson	Iceland	x	76.03		76.03	Q NJR
3	Alexei Mikhailov	Germany	74.89			74.89	Q PB
4	Tshepang Makhethe	South Africa	72.83	72.99	72.95	72.99	q
5	Igor Evseev	Russia	69.45	69.97	72.52	72.52	q
6	Maksim Mitskou	Belarus	72.38	x	72.26	72.38	q
7	Bence Halász	Hungary	x	71.95	71.64	71.95	
8	Markus Kokkonen	Finland	68.93	70.47	69.86	70.47	
9	Artem Poleshko	Ukraine	69.21	69.96	69.91	69.96	
10	Charles Ionata	United States	64.46	64.07	69.93	69.93	PB
11	Gabriel Kehr	Chile	68.87	69.38	69.84	69.84	PB
12	Costa Kousparis	Australia	65.24	62.20	65.93	65.93	
13	Miguel Alberto Blanco	Spain	62.67	x	x	62.67	

===== Group B =====
25 July
Start time; 11:59 Temperature: 20 °C Humidity: 56 %
End time: 12:41 Temperature: 21 °C Humidity: 53 %

Rank	Name	Nationality	Attempts			Result	Notes
Rank	Name	Nationality	1	2	3	Result	Notes
1	Bence Pásztor	Hungary	79.26			79.26	Q
2	Joaquín Gómez	Argentina	67.09	75.77		75.77	Q AJR
3	Ilya Terentyev	Russia	75.39			75.39	Q
4	Matija Gregurić	Croatia	74.02	74.28	x	74.28	q
5	Denzel Comenentia	Netherlands	67.71	73.11	67.40	73.11	q
6	Taylor Campbell	United Kingdom	72.19	72.87	x	72.87	q
7	Tolgahan Yavuz	Turkey	68.92	72.27	69.78	72.27	
8	Ahmed Amgad Elsify	Qatar	71.69	68.84	71.30	71.69	PB
9	Humberto Mansilla	Chile	69.87	71.28	70.06	71.28	
10	Raman Zholudzeu	Belarus	70.73	68.84	x	70.73	
11	Kevin Arreaga	Spain	x	x	69.65	69.65	
12	Matthew Denny	Australia	x	69.16	x	69.16	
13	Clarence Gallop	United States	65.95	65.20	63.23	65.95	
	Volodymyr Myslyvchuk	Ukraine				DNS	

== Participation ==
According to an unofficial count, 26 athletes from 18 countries participated in the event.

- Argentina (1)
- Australia (2)
- Belarus (2)
- Chile (2)
- Croatia (1)
- Finland (1)
- Germany (1)
- Hungary (2)
- Iceland (1)
- Netherlands (1)
- Qatar (2)
- Russia (2)
- South Africa (1)
- Spain (2)
- Turkey (1)
- Ukraine (1)
- United Kingdom (1)
- United States (2)
