= Chile at the 2015 World Championships in Athletics =

- WA code: CHI

in Beijing
- Competitors: 6
- Medals: Gold 0 Silver 0 Bronze 0 Total 0

World Championships in Athletics appearances
- 1983; 1987; 1991; 1993; 1995; 1997; 1999; 2001; 2003; 2005; 2007; 2009; 2011; 2013; 2015; 2017; 2019; 2022; 2023; 2025

Chile competed at the 2015 World Championships in Athletics in Beijing, China, from 22–30 August 2015.

== Results ==
(q – qualified, NM – no mark, SB – season best)

=== Men ===
Track and road events

Athlete	Event	Heat		Semifinal		Final	
Athlete	Event	Result	Rank	Result	Rank	Result	Rank
Carlos Díaz	1500 metres	3:39.75	18 q	3:47.48	24	did not advance	
Víctor Aravena	5000 metres	14:29.34	36	—N/a		did not advance	
Yerko Araya	20 kilometres walk	—N/a				1:29:12	50

=== Women ===
Track and road events

Athlete	Event	Heat		Semifinal		Final	
Athlete	Event	Result	Rank	Result	Rank	Result	Rank
Isidora Jiménez	100 metres	11.47	33	did not advance			
Isidora Jiménez	200 metres	23.22	28	did not advance			

Field events

Athlete	Event	Qualification		Final	
Athlete	Event	Distance	Position	Distance	Position
Natalia Ducó	Shot put	18.29	8 q	17.98	9
Karen Gallardo	Discus throw	58.32	22	did not advance	
