= Archery at the 2015 Pan American Games – Qualification =

== Qualification system ==
A total of 64 archers (32 per gender) will qualify to compete at the games. There was three qualification tournaments for countries to qualify their athletes. A nation may enter only three athletes per gender. If a nation does qualify the maximum number of athletes, it will also qualify for the team event in the respective gender.

The top five teams plus the host nation will qualify three athletes per respective gender at the Pan American Championships. The Top athletes in each gender will also qualify from the Pan American Olympic Festival. Eight individual slots are also up for qualification at the 2014 Pan American Championship. Finally, four slots per gender will also be available at a last chance qualification tournament in 2015. If a country winning a slot at the Pan American Olympic Festival, wins a team slot later, the individual quota is added to the eight available at the Pan American Championship.

A nation may also qualify a team if it managed to qualify up to three individuals at the three qualification tournaments. An archer may not compete in the last chance qualification event, if they have already qualified a quota for their country.

== Qualification timeline ==
Event	Date	Venue
2014 Pan American Sports Festival	July 17–19	(Mexico) Toluca
2014 Pan American Championship	October 19–25	(Argentina) Rosario
2015 Copa Merengue	March 16–22	(Dominican Republic) Santo Domingo

== Qualification summary ==
Nation	Men		Women		Total
Nation	Individual	Team	Individual	Team	Athletes
Argentina	2		3	X	5
Brazil	3	X	3	X	6
Canada	3	X	3	X	6
Chile	3	X	3	X	6
Colombia	3	X	3	X	6
Costa Rica			1		1
Cuba	3	X	3	X	6
Dominican Republic	2		2		4
Ecuador	1				1
El Salvador	1		1		2
Guatemala	2		1		3
Mexico	3	X	3	X	6
Puerto Rico	2				2
United States	3	X	3	X	6
Venezuela	1		3	X	4
Total: 15 NOCs	32	7	32	9	64

== Men ==
Event	Criterion	Qualified	Archers per NOC	Total
Host nation	–	Canada	3	3
2014 Pan American Olympic Festival^{1}	–	–	1	0
2014 Pan American Championship	Team event	Colombia; United States; Cuba; Chile; Mexico	3	15
2014 Pan American Championship	Individual event	Brazil; Guatemala; Dominican Republic	2	6
2014 Pan American Championship	Individual event	Venezuela; Ecuador; Puerto Rico; El Salvador	1	4
2015 Copa Merengue	Individual event	Argentina	2	2
2015 Copa Merengue	Individual event	Brazil; Puerto Rico	1	2
TOTAL				32

1. The United States and Mexico won individual spots at the Pan American Olympic Festival, but later won team spots. This mean the two individual quotas were added to the Pan American Championships.

== Women ==
Event	Criterion	Qualified	Archers per NOC	Total
Host nation	–	Canada	3	3
2014 Pan American Olympic Festival^{2}	–	–	1	0
2014 Pan American Championship	Team event	Colombia; Mexico; United States; Cuba; Venezuela	3	15
2014 Pan American Championship	Individual event	Brazil	3	3
2014 Pan American Championship	Individual event	Chile; Argentina	2	4
2014 Pan American Championship	Individual event	El Salvador; Costa Rica; Dominican Republic	1	3
2015 Copa Merengue	–	Argentina; Chile; Dominican Republic; Guatemala	1	4
TOTAL				32

1. ^2The United States and Colombia won individual spots at the Pan American Olympic Festival, but later won team spots. This mean the two individual quotas were added to the Pan American Championships.
