= Athletics at the 2007 Pan American Games – Men's hammer throw =

Men's hammer throw at the Pan American Games

The men's hammer throw event at the 2007 Pan American Games was held on July 25.

== Results ==
Rank	Athlete	Nationality	#1	#2	#3	#4	#5	#6	Result	Notes
1st place, gold medalist(s)	James Steacy	Canada	71.60	73.77	71.14	x	73.52	71.31	73.77	
2nd place, silver medalist(s)	Kibwe Johnson	United States	x	69.08	x	70.72	68.93	73.23	73.23	
3rd place, bronze medalist(s)	Juan Ignacio Cerra	Argentina	70.61	71.57	68.24	69.92	70.89	72.12	72.12	
4	A. G. Kruger	United States	66.31	65.82	68.48	68.71	66.74	67.40	68.71	
5	Patricio Palma	Chile	65.60	67.86	66.07	x	67.80	66.82	67.86	PB
6	Noleysi Bicet	Cuba	67.51	66.61	66.98	x	67.40	66.44	67.51	
7	Wagner Domingos	Brazil	62.50	63.38	64.11	62.18	64.03	65.27	65.27	
8	Aldo Bello	Venezuela	61.78	63.98	63.25	63.53	x	62.33	63.98	
9	Marcos dos Santos	Brazil	61.86	x	61.58				61.86	
10	Leonardo Pino	Chile	60.75	61.61	61.47				61.61	
11	Rául Rivera	Guatemala	60.10	x	57.66				60.10	
12	Roberto Sawyers	Costa Rica	x	x	57.45				57.45	
13	Michael Letterlough	Cayman Islands	x	55.30	x				55.30	
