= Chile at the 2017 World Championships in Athletics =

- Flag of Chile
- WA code: CHI
- National federation: Chilean Athletics Federation
- Website: atleticachilena.cl

in London, United Kingdom 4–13 August 2017
- Competitors: 9 (6 men and 3 women) in 7 events
- Medals: Gold 0 Silver 0 Bronze 0 Total 0

World Championships in Athletics appearances
- 1983; 1987; 1991; 1993; 1995; 1997; 1999; 2001; 2003; 2005; 2007; 2009; 2011; 2013; 2015; 2017; 2019; 2022; 2023; 2025

Chile competed at the 2017 World Championships in Athletics in London, United Kingdom, from 4 to 13 August 2017.

Consisting of nine athletes (six men and three women), the Chilean delegation was the largest in the history of the competition.

== Results ==
=== Men ===
Track and road events

Athlete	Event	Heat		Final	
Athlete	Event	Time	Rank	Time	Rank
Víctor Aravena	5000 metres	DNS	–	Did not advance	
Manuel Cabrera	Marathon	—N/a		2:24:08	55
Leslie Encina	Marathon	—N/a		2:22:10	49
Enzo Yáñez	Marathon	—N/a		DNF	–
Yerko Araya	20 kilometres walk	—N/a		1:23:46	39
Edward Araya	50 kilometres walk	—N/a		DQ	–

=== Women ===
Track and road events

Athlete	Event	Heat		Semifinal		Final	
Athlete	Event	Time	Rank	Time	Rank	Time	Rank
Isidora Jiménez	200 metres	23.89	41	Did not advance			

Field events

Athlete	Event	Qualification		Final	
Athlete	Event	Distance	Position	Distance	Position
Natalia Duco	Shot put	17.66	15	Did not advance	
Karen Gallardo	Discus throw	52.81	29	Did not advance	
