= Chile at the 2009 World Championships in Athletics =

- WA code: CHI

in Berlin
- Competitors: 4 (2 men, 2 women)
- Medals: Gold 0 Silver 0 Bronze 0 Total 0

World Championships in Athletics appearances
- 1983; 1987; 1991; 1993; 1995; 1997; 1999; 2001; 2003; 2005; 2007; 2009; 2011; 2013; 2015; 2017; 2019; 2022; 2023; 2025

Chile competed at the 2009 World Championships in Athletics from 15–23 August in Berlin.

== Team selection ==
Track and road events

| Event | Athletes | |
| Event | Men | Women |
|---|---|---|
| 20 km race walk | Yerko Araya | |
| Marathon | | Clara Morales |

Field and combined events

| Event | Athletes | |
| Event | Men | Women |
|---|---|---|
| Javelin throw | Ignacio Guerra | |
| Shot Put | | Natalia Ducó |

== Results ==
=== Men ===
Track and road events

| Event | Athletes | Final | |
| Event | Athletes | Result | Rank |
|---|---|---|---|
| 20km Walk | Yerko Araya | 1:24:49 | 29 |

Field and combined events

| Event | Athletes | Qualification | | Final | |
| Event | Athletes | Result | Rank | Result | Rank |
|---|---|---|---|---|---|
| Javelin throw | Ignacio Guerra | NM | | did not advance | |

=== Women ===
Track and road events

| Event | Athletes | Final | |
| Event | Athletes | Result | Rank |
|---|---|---|---|
| Marathon | Clara Morales | DNS | |

Field and combined events

| Event | Athletes | Qualification | | Final | |
| Event | Athletes | Result | Rank | Result | Rank |
|---|---|---|---|---|---|
| Shot put | Natalia Ducó | 17.61 | 19 | did not advance | |
