= Athletics at the 2014 Pan American Sports Festival =

- Dates: August 15–16
- Host city: Mexico City, Mexico
- Venue: Estadio Jesús Martínez "Palillo"
- Level: Senior
- Events: 34 (17 men, 17 women)
- Participation: 270 athletes from 36 nations

Athletics at the 2014 Pan American Sports Festival took place from August 15 to 16, 2014. The event was held at the Estadio Jesús Martínez "Palillo" in Mexico City, Mexico. A total of 34 events were contested, 17 by men and 17 by women. There were no road races, no relays, and no combined events.

The winner of each competition qualifies automatically for the 2015 Pan American Games in Toronto.

== Medal summary ==
The results and medal winners were published.

=== Men ===
Event	Gold		Silver		Bronze	
100 metres	Jason Rogers (SKN)	10.08	Daniel Bailey (ATG)	10.10	Isidro Montoya (COL)	10.31
200 metres	Sheldon Mitchell (JAM)	20.14	Roberto Skyers (CUB)	20.28	Jermaine Brown (JAM)	20.28
400 metres	Luguelín Santos (DOM)	45.06	Allodin Fothergill (JAM)	45.47	Yoandys Lescay (CUB)	45.54
800 metres	Andy González (CUB)	1:49.61	Tayron Reyes (DOM)	1:50.06	James Eichberger (MEX)	1:50.26
1500 metres	Marvin Blanco (VEN)	3:47.39	Christopher Sandoval (MEX)	3:48.75	Carlos Díaz (CHI)	3:49.20
5000 metres	Juan Luis Barrios (MEX)	14:22.24	Saby Luna (MEX)	14:28.84	Juan Carlos Romero (MEX)	14:31.65
3000 metres steeplechase	Marvin Blanco (VEN)	9:18.44	Gerard Giraldo (COL)	9:19.91	Luis Enrique Ibarra (MEX)	9:20.42
110 metres hurdles	Ryan Brathwaite (BAR)	13.41	Deuce Carter (JAM)	13.51	Eddie Lovett (ISV)	13.62
400 metres hurdles	Jeffery Gibson (BAH)	48.91	Joseph Robertson (JAM)	49.04	Andrés Silva (URU)	49.08
High jump	Nick Ross (USA)	2.26 m	Jamal Wilson (BAH)	2.26 m	Edgar Rivera (MEX)	2.23 m
Pole vault	Germán Chiaraviglio (ARG)	5.20 m	Lázaro Borges (CUB)	5.15 m	Yankier Lara (CUB)	5.00 m
Long jump	David Registe (DMA)	8.06 m	Jorge McFarlane (PER)	8.01 m	Yunior Díaz (CUB)	7.83 m
Triple jump	Yordanis Durañona (DMA)	17.20 m	Samyr Lainé (HAI)	17.10 m	Lázaro Martínez (CUB)	16.53 m
Shot put	Jordan Clarke (USA)	20.57 m	Darlan Romani (BRA)	20.03 m	Stephen Sáenz (MEX)	19.91 m
Discus throw	Jorge Fernández (CUB)	64.94 m	Jared Schuurmans (USA)	59.90 m	Ronald Julião (BRA)	59.40 m
Hammer throw	Roberto Janet (CUB)	73.94 m	Roberto Sawyer (CRC)	73.85 m	Wagner Domingos (BRA)	73.77 m
Javelin throw	Júlio César de Oliveira (BRA)	79.10 m	Craig Kinsley (USA)	78.76 m	Sean Furey (USA)	77.23 m

=== Women ===
Event	Gold		Silver		Bronze	
100 metres	Ángela Tenorio (ECU)	11.48	Audra Segree (JAM)	11.57	Gayon Evans (JAM)	11.72
200 metres (wind: +2.1 m/s)	Ángela Tenorio (ECU)	22.82w	Allison Peter (ISV)	23.03w	Audra Segree (JAM)	23.15w
400 metres	Anastasia Le-Roy (JAM)	51.28	Daysiurami Bonne (CUB)	51.78	Bobby-Gaye Wilkins (JAM)	51.84
800 metres	Rose Mary Almanza (CUB)	2:03.56	Sahily Diago (CUB)	2:04.30	Gabriela Medina (MEX)	2:04.47
1500 metres	Cristina Guevara (MEX)	4:24.37	María Mancebo (DOM)	4:25.48	Gabriela Eleno (MEX)	4:28.89
5000 metres	Brenda Flores (MEX)	16:54.60	Margarita Hernández (MEX)	17:06.27	Anayelli Navarro (MEX)	17:10.13
100 metres hurdles	Yvette Lewis (PAN)	12.86	Shermaine Williams (JAM)	12.91	Andrea Bliss (JAM)	13.18
400 metres hurdles	Zudikey Rodríguez (MEX)	55.78	Zuriam Hechavarria (CUB)	56.54	Nickiesha Wilson (JAM)	56.64
3000 metres steeplechase	Zulema Arenas (PER)	10:21.05	María Mancebo (DOM)	10:46.05	Cinthya Paucar (PER)	11:02.55
High jump	Levern Spencer (LCA)	1.88 m	Jeannelle Scheper (LCA)	1.85 m	Tynita Butts (USA)	1.80 m
Pole vault	Valeria Chiaraviglio (ARG)	4.00 m	Jocelyn Villegas (MEX)	3.50 m	Not awarded^{[nb1]}	
Long jump	Yulimar Rojas (VEN)	6.53 mw (wind: +2.1 m/s)	Irisdaymi Herrera (CUB)	6.43 m	Vanessa Seles (BRA)	6.36 mw (wind: +2.2 m/s)
Triple jump	Mabel Gay (CUB)	14.53 m	Yarianna Martínez (CUB)	14.29 m	Dailenys Alcántara (CUB)	14.29 m
Shot put	Yaniuvis López (CUB)	17.96 m	Natalia Ducó (CHI)	17.88 m	Brittany Smith (USA)	17.60 m
Discus throw	Denia Caballero (CUB)	62.19 m	Fernanda Raquel Borges (BRA)	60.87 m	Karen Gallardo (CHI)	58.24 m
Hammer throw	Gwen Berry (USA)	72.04 m	Yipsi Moreno (CUB)	69.65 m	Brittany Smith (USA)	69.50 m
Javelin throw	Jucilene de Lima (BRA)	59.86 m	Lismania Muñoz (CUB)	58.40 m	Coralys Ortiz (PUR)	58.20 m

- ^{nb1} Three competitors entered the pole vault but Mexico's Martha Olimpia Villalobos failed to record a valid height.

== Medal table ==
* Host nation (Mexico)

Rank	Nation	Gold	Silver	Bronze	Total
1	Cuba	7	9	5	21
2	Mexico*	4	4	8	16
3	United States	3	2	4	9
4	Venezuela	3	0	0	3
5	Jamaica	2	5	6	13
6	Brazil	2	2	3	7
7	Argentina	2	0	0	2
7	Dominica	2	0	0	2
7	Ecuador	2	0	0	2
10	Dominican Republic	1	3	0	4
11	Peru	1	1	1	3
12	Bahamas	1	1	0	2
12	Saint Lucia	1	1	0	2
14	Barbados	1	0	0	1
14	Panama	1	0	0	1
14	Saint Kitts and Nevis	1	0	0	1
17	Chile	0	1	2	3
18	Colombia	0	1	1	2
18	U.S. Virgin Islands	0	1	1	2
20	Costa Rica	0	1	0	1
20	Haiti	0	1	0	1
20	Netherlands Antilles	0	1	0	1
23	Puerto Rico	0	0	1	1
23	Uruguay	0	0	1	1
Totals (24 entries)		34	34	33	101

== Participation ==
According to an unofficial count, 270 athletes from 36 countries participated.

- Antigua and Barbuda (2)
- Argentina (6)
- Aruba (1)
- Bahamas (5)
- Barbados (2)
- Bolivia (2)
- Brazil (14)
- Chile (10)
- Colombia (16)
- Costa Rica (2)
- Cuba (40)
- Dominica (3)
- Dominican Republic (5)
- Ecuador (2)
- El Salvador (2)
- Grenada (1)
- Guatemala (1)
- Guyana (3)
- Haiti (2)
- Honduras (2)
- Jamaica (35)
- Mexico (46)
- Nicaragua (1)
- Panama (5)
- Paraguay (7)
- Peru (4)
- Puerto Rico (9)
- Saint Kitts and Nevis (3)
- Saint Lucia (3)
- Saint Vincent and the Grenadines (3)
- Suriname (2)
- Trinidad and Tobago (1)
- Uruguay (4)
- United States (19)
- U.S. Virgin Islands (3)
- Venezuela (4)
