= Joaquín Gómez (athlete) =

Argentine hammer thrower (born 1996)

Personal information
- Full name: Joaquín Gabriel Gómez
- Born: 14 October 1996 (age 29) Avellaneda, Buenos Aires, Argentina
- Height: 1.72 m (5 ft 8 in)
- Weight: 105 kg (231 lb)

Sport
- Country: Argentina
- Sport: Track and field
- Event: Hammer throw
Medal record
Men's athletics
Representing Argentina
South American Youth Championships
Gold medal – first place	2012 Mendoza	Hammer throw
- Updated on 20 January 2015

Joaquín Gabriel Gómez (born 14 October 1996) is an Argentine hammer thrower.

Gómez won the hammer throw event at the 2012 South American Youth Championships in Athletics in Mendoza, Argentina, breaking the championship record with an 81.15 metre throw.

His father, Daniel Gómez, was the 1977 and 1985 South American hammer throw champion.

== Personal bests ==
Event	Result	Venue	Date
Hammer throw	77.69 m	(Argentina) Mar del Plata	25 April 2025
Hammer throw (6 kg)	80.59 m	(Ecuador) Cuenca	31 May 2015
Hammer throw (5 kg)	85.38 m	(Argentina) Buenos Aires	30 Nov 2013

== Competition record ==
Year	Competition	Venue	Position	Event	Notes
Representing Argentina
2012	South American Youth Championships	Mendoza, Argentina	1st	Hammer (5 kg)	81.15 m
2013	World Youth Championships	Donetsk, Ukraine	—	Hammer (5 kg)	NM
2013	South American Junior Championships	Resistencia, Chaco, Argentina	1st	Hammer (6 kg)	70.90 m
2014	World Junior Championships	Eugene, Oregon, United States	8th	Hammer (6 kg)	73.67 m
2014	South American U23 Championships	Montevideo, Uruguay	1st	Hammer	67.98 m
2016	Ibero-American Championships	Rio de Janeiro, Brazil	5th	Hammer	67.34 m
2016	South American U23 Championships	Lima, Peru	2nd	Hammer	71.56 m
2017	South American Championships	Asunción, Paraguay	4th	Hammer	70.96 m
2017	Universiade	Taipei, Taiwan	9th	Hammer	69.49 m
2018	South American Games	Cochabamba, Bolivia	1st	Hammer	75.10 m
2018	Ibero-American Championships	Trujillo, Peru	2nd	Hammer	74.64 m
2018	South American U23 Championships	Cuenca, Ecuador	2nd	Hammer	75.96 m
2019	South American Championships	Lima, Peru	4th	Hammer	71.47 m
2019	Universiade	Naples, Italy	5th	Hammer	72.26 m
2019	Pan American Games	Lima, Peru	5th	Hammer	73.92 m
2019	World Championships	Doha, Qatar	31st (q)	Hammer	70.17 m
2021	South American Championships	Guayaquil, Ecuador	3rd	Hammer	71.32 m
2022	Ibero-American Championships	La Nucía, Spain	6th	Hammer	68.06 m
2022	World Championships	Eugene, United States	28th (q)	Hammer	69.03 m
2022	South American Games	Asunción, Paraguay	3rd	Hammer	73.56 m
2023	South American Championships	São Paulo, Brazil	3rd	Hammer	73.77 m
2023	World Championships	Budapest, Hungary	21st (q)	Hammer	72.77 m
2023	Pan American Games	Santiago, Chile	7th	Hammer	72.36 m
2024	Ibero-American Championships	Cuiabá, Brazil	10th	Hammer	66.37 m
2024	Olympic Games	Paris, France	23rd (q)	Hammer	72.10 m
2025	South American Championships	Mar del Plata, Argentina	1st	Hammer	77.69 m
2025	World Championships	Tokyo, Japan	27th (q)	Hammer	72.68 m
2026	Ibero-American Championships	Lima, Peru	2nd	Hammer	74.05 m
2026	Pan American Championships	Medellín, Colombia	6th	Hammer	73.38 m
2026	South American Games	Santa Fe, Argentina	3rd	Hammer	73.46 m
