= Athletics at the 2019 Summer Universiade – Men's hammer throw =

The men's hammer throw event at the 2019 Summer Universiade was held on 8 and 9 July at the Stadio San Paolo in Naples.

== Medalists ==
Gold	Silver	Bronze
Özkan Baltacı; Turkey	Serhii Reheda; Ukraine	Taylor Campbell; Great Britain

== Results ==
=== Qualification ===
Qualification: 73.00 m (Q) or at least 12 best (q) qualified for the final.

Rank	Group	Name	Nationality	#1	#2	#3	Result	Notes
1	B	Özkan Baltacı	Turkey	73.10			73.10	Q
2	A	Joaquín Gómez	Argentina	69.95	67.93	72.48	72.48	q
3	A	Serhii Reheda	Ukraine	68.50	72.35	x	72.35	q
4	A	Taylor Campbell	Great Britain	71.48	x	x	71.48	q
5	B	Henri Liipola	Finland	63.75	69.89	x	69.89	q
6	B	Gleb Dudarev	Belarus	x	69.54	x	69.54	q
7	A	Tommi Remes	Finland	67.06	68.19	x	68.19	q
8	B	Allan Cumming	South Africa	63.10	67.26	x	67.26	q
9	B	Tshepang Makhethe	South Africa	62.49	67.07	65.94	67.07	q
10	B	Joseph Ellis	Great Britain	x	64.80	65.67	65.67	q
11	A	Yury Vasilchanka	Belarus	64.30	x	64.60	64.60	q
12	A	Pradeep Kumar	India	59.40	x	57.99	59.40	q
13	A	Toomas Tankler	Estonia	54.39	57.04	57.37	57.37	
14	B	Youssef Abdalkalik	Egypt	57.06	57.24	x	57.24	
15	B	Gurkirat Singh	India	x	x	54.34	54.34	
	A	Basim Al-Aithan	Saudi Arabia	x	x	x	NM	
	A	Marcin Wrotyński	Poland	x	x	x	NM	
	B	Karol Končoš	Slovakia	x	x	x	NM	
	A	Daniel McArthur	United States				DNS	

=== Final ===
Official Video

Rank	Name	Nationality	#1	#2	#3	#4	#5	#6	Result	Notes
1st place, gold medalist(s)	Özkan Baltacı	Turkey	74.49	75.98	74.61	73.08	x	75.94	75.98	SB
2nd place, silver medalist(s)	Serhii Reheda	Ukraine	69.89	72.33	x	x	x	74.27	74.27	
3rd place, bronze medalist(s)	Taylor Campbell	Great Britain	73.86	72.31	73.64	x	x	x	73.86	PB
4	Gleb Dudarev	Belarus	70.80	71.10	71.83	x	72.35	x	72.35	
5	Joaquín Gómez	Argentina	x	68.46	72.26	x	x	72.16	72.26	
6	Yury Vasilchanka	Belarus	71.59	x	x	x	x	70.13	71.59	
7	Henri Liipola	Finland	70.32	x	70.11	x	x	x	70.32	
8	Allan Cumming	South Africa	x	66.49	65.16	65.64	64.77	65.50	66.49	
9	Joseph Ellis	Great Britain	66.27	x	x				66.27	
10	Tshepang Makhethe	South Africa	63.48	62.85	65.70				65.70	
11	Tommi Remes	Finland	x	x	63.73				63.73	
12	Pradeep Kumar	India	60.51	x	x				60.51	
