= Aldo Bello =

Venezuelan hammer thrower (born 1975)

Personal information
- Full name: Aldo Jonathan Bello Morillo
- Born: 23 May 1975 (age 51) Maracaibo, Zulia, Venezuela
- Height: 1.73 m (5 ft 8 in)
- Weight: 107 kg (236 lb)

Sport
- Country: Venezuela
- Sport: Men's Athletics
- Event: Hammer thrower
- Now coaching: club Atletismo Rinconada
Medal record
Athletics
Representing Venezuela
Bolivarian Games
Gold medal – first place	2001 Ambato	Hammer throw
Gold medal – first place	2005 Armenia	Hammer throw
Gold medal – first place	2009 Sucre	Hammer throw
Silver medal – second place	1997 Arequipa	Hammer throw
CAC Junior Championships (U20)
Gold medal – first place	1994 Port of Spain	Hammer throw
- Updated on 11 June 2014

Aldo Jonathan Bello Morillo (born 23 May 1975) is a Venezuelan hammer thrower. His personal best throw is 67.63 metres, achieved in August 2005 in Armenia.

== Biography ==
He won the silver medal at the 2001 Central American and Caribbean Championships, the bronze medal at the 2002 Central American and Caribbean Games, the gold medal at the 2003 Central American and Caribbean Championships, the bronze medal at the 2003 South American Championships and the bronze medal at the 2006 Central American and Caribbean Games. He also became Cuban champion in 2006.

== Personal bests ==
- Hammer throw: 68.34 m – Brežice, Slovenia, 27 August 2011

== Achievements ==
Year	Competition	Venue	Position	Event	Notes
Representing the Venezuela
1993	South American Junior Championships	Puerto la Cruz, Venezuela	4th	Hammer	53.10 m
1994	Central American and Caribbean Junior Championships (U-20)	Port of Spain, Trinidad and Tobago	1st	Hammer	54.68 m
1994	South American Junior Championships	Santa Fe, Argentina	2nd	Hammer	55.62 m
1997	Bolivarian Games	Arequipa, Peru	2nd	Hammer	60.70 m NR
1998	Central American and Caribbean Games	Maracaibo, Venezuela	4th	Hammer	62.12 m NR
1999	South American Championships	Bogotá, Colombia	4th	Hammer	63.19 m
2000	Ibero-American Championships	Rio de Janeiro, Brazil	7th	Hammer	63.19 m
2001	Central American and Caribbean Championships	Guatemala City, Guatemala	3rd	Hammer	61.80 m A
2001	Bolivarian Games	Ambato, Ecuador	1st	Hammer	65.95 m NR GR
2002	Central American and Caribbean Games	San Salvador, El Salvador	3rd	Hammer	65.35 m
2003	South American Championships	Barquisimeto, Venezuela	3rd	Hammer	65.27 m
2003	Central American and Caribbean Championships	St. George's, Grenada	2nd	Hammer	64.26 m
2005	ALBA Games	Havana, Cuba	5th	Hammer	63.29 m
2005	Bolivarian Games	Armenia, Colombia	1st	Hammer	67.63 m NR GR
2006	Central American and Caribbean Games	Cartagena, Colombia	3rd	Hammer	62.55 m
2007	ALBA Games	Caracas, Venezuela	4th	Hammer	66.63 m
2007	South American Championships	São Paulo, Brazil	5th	Hammer	64.68 m
2007	Pan American Games	Rio de Janeiro, Brazil	8th	Hammer	63.98 m
2009	ALBA Games	Havana, Cuba	5th	Hammer	65.98 m
2009	South American Championships	Lima, Peru	6th	Hammer	63.20 m
2009	Central American and Caribbean Championships	Havana, Cuba	4th	Hammer	65.24 m
2009	Bolivarian Games	Sucre, Bolivia	1st	Hammer	64.45 m
2010	Central American and Caribbean Games	Mayagüez, Puerto Rico	1st	Hammer	65.10 m
2011	Pan American Games	Guadalajara, Mexico	8th	Hammer	63.46 m SB
2012	Ibero-American Championships	Barquisimeto, Venezuela	6th	Hammer	64.79 m
2013	Bolivarian Games	Trujillo, Peru	2nd	Hammer	65.76 m
