= 2011 USA Outdoor Track and Field Championships =

- Dates: June 23–26
- Host city: Eugene, Oregon, United States
- Venue: Hayward Field
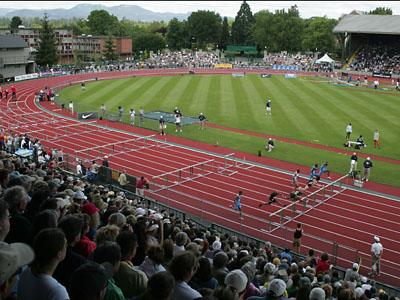
- Level: Senior
- Type: Outdoor
- Events: 40 (men: 20; women: 20)
- Records set: 5

The 2011 USA Outdoor Track and Field Championships were held at Hayward Field in Eugene, Oregon. Organised by USA Track and Field, the four-day competition took place from June 23–26 and served as the national championships in track and field for the United States. The results determined qualification for the American team at the 2011 World Championships in Athletics, to be held in Daegu.

The competition was broadcast on television by three networks: ESPN2, Universal Sports and NBC.

== Medal summary ==
=== Men track events ===
Event	Gold		Silver		Bronze	
100 m (Wind: +1.3 m/s)	Walter Dix	9.94	Justin Gatlin	9.95	Mike Rodgers	9.99
200 m (Wind: +2.4 m/s)	Walter Dix	19.95	Darvis Patton	19.98	Jeremy Dodson	20.07
400 m	Tony McQuay	44.68	Jeremy Wariner	44.98	Greg Nixon	44.98
800 m	Nicholas Symmonds	1:44.17	Khadevis Robinson	1:44.49	Charles Jock	1:44.67
1500 m	Matthew Centrowitz, Jr.	3:47.63	Bernard Lagat	3:47.96	Leonel Manzano	3:48.16
5000 m	Bernard Lagat	13:23.06	Chris Solinsky	13:23.65	Galen Rupp	13:25.52
10,000 m	Galen Rupp	28:38.17	Matt Tegenkamp	28:39.97	Scott Bauhs	28:40.51
110 m hurdles (Wind: +1.4 m/s)	David Oliver	13.04	Aries Merritt	13.12	Jason Richardson	13.15
400 m hurdles	Jeshua Anderson	47.93	Bershawn Jackson	47.93	Angelo Taylor	47.94
3000 m steeplechase	William Nelson	8:28.46	Daniel Huling	8:29.27	Kyle Alcorn	8:29.44
20000 m walk	Trevor Barron	1:23:25.10 NR CR	John Nunn	1:23:51.73	Patrick Stroupe	1:26:29.44

=== Men field events ===
Event	Gold		Silver		Bronze	
High jump	Jesse Williams	2.37 m CR	Dustin Jonas	2.31 m	Erik Kynard	2.28 m
Pole vault	Derek Miles	5.66 m	Jeremy Scott	5.60 m	Nick Mossberg	5.54 m
Long jump	Marquise Goodwin	8.33 m	William Claye	8.19 m	Jeremy Hicks	8.10 m
Triple jump	Christian Taylor	17.49 m	William Claye	17.09 m	Walter Davis	17.02 m
Shot put	Adam Nelson	22.09 m	Christian Cantwell	21.87 m	Reese Hoffa	21.86 m
Discus throw	Jarred Rome	63.99 m	Jason Young	63.81 m	Lance Brooks	63.42 m
Hammer throw	Kibwe Johnson	80.42 m	Michael Mai	74,69 m	Matthew Dibuono	73,06 m
Javelin throw	Mike Hazle	78,22 m	Sean Furey	77,99 m	Cyrus Hostetler	77,84 m
Decathlon	Ashton Eaton	8729 pts	Jon Harlan	8011 pts	Miller Moss	7878 pts

=== Women track events ===
Event	Gold		Silver		Bronze	
100 m (Wind: +2.7 m/s)	Carmelita Jeter	10.74 w	Marshevet Myers	10.83 w	Mikele Barber	10.96 w
200 m	Shalonda Solomon	22.15	Carmelita Jeter	22.23	Jeneba Tarmoh	22.28
400 m	Allyson Felix	50.40	Francena McCorory	50.49	Debbie Dunn	50.70
800 m	Alysia Montano	1:58.33	Maggie Vessey	1:58.86	Alice Schmidt	1:59.21
1500 m	Morgan Uceny	4:03.91	Jennifer Simpson	4:05.66	Shannon Rowbury	4:06.20
5000 m	Molly Huddle	15:10.01	Amy Hastings	15:14.31	Angela Bizzarri	15:16.04
10,000 m	Shalane Flanagan	30:59.97 CR	Kara Goucher	31:16.65	Jennifer Rhines	31:30.37
100 m hurdles (Wind: +1.8 m/s)	Kellie Wells	12.50	Danielle Carruthers	12.59	Dawn Harper	12.65
400 m hurdles	Lashinda Demus	54.21	Queen Harrison	54.78	Jasmine Chaney	55.22
3000 m steeplechase	Emma Coburn	9:44.11	Bridget Franek	9:44.90	Delilah DiCrescenzo	9:46.31
20000 m walk	Maria Michta	1:34:51.47	Teresa Vaill	1:35:35.92	Lauren Forgues	1:37:40.86

=== Women field events ===
Event	Gold		Silver		Bronze	
High jump	Brigetta Barrett	1.95 m	Elizabeth Patterson	1.89 m	Inika McPherson	1.86 m
Pole vault	Kylie Hutson	4.65 m	Jennifer Suhr	4.60 m	Lacy Janson	4.50 m
Long jump	Brittney Reese	7.19 m CR	Janay DeLoach	6.97 m	Funmi Jimoh	6.88 m
Triple jump	Amanda Smock	14.07 m	Crystal Manning	13.97 m	Toni Smith	13.52 m
Shot put	Michelle Carter	19.86 m CR	Jillian Camarena-Williams	19.85 m	Sarah Stevens-Walker	18.12 m
Discus throw	Stephanie Brown-Trafton	63.35 m	Aretha Thurmond	62.87 m	Gia Lewis-Smallwood	60.53 m
Hammer throw	Jessica Cosby	71.33 m	Amber Campbell	70.07 m	Keelin Godsey	68.90 m
Javelin throw	Kara Patterson	59.34 m	Rachel Yurkovich	54.91 m	Alicia DeShasier	54.01 m
Heptathlon	Sharon Day	6058 pts	Ryann Krais	6030 pts	Chantae McMillan	6003 pts
