= Sean Donnelly =

American hammer thrower (born 1993)

Personal information
- Born: 1 April 1993 (age 33) Willoughby, Ohio, United States
- Education: University of Minnesota

Sport
- Sport: Track and field
- Event: Hammer throw
- College team: Minnesota Golden Gophers
- Club: Adidas
- Coached by: John Dagata
Medal record
Representing United States
Pan American Games
Bronze medal – third place	2019 Lima	Hammer throw

Sean Donnelly (born April 1, 1993) is an American track and field athlete specializing in the hammer throw. He won a bronze medal at the 2019 Pan American Games. In addition, he represented the Americas at the 2018 IAAF Continental Cup. He graduated from Mount Union University in 2014 and continued his education at the University of Minnesota.

His personal best in the event is 79.27 meters set in Tucson, Arizona in 2021.

== International competitions ==
Year	Competition	Venue	Position	Event	Notes
Representing the United States
2018	Continental Cup	Ostrava, Czech Republic	–	Hammer throw	NM (Note: Representing the Americas)
2019	Pan American Games	Lima, Peru	3rd	Hammer throw	74.23 m
