= Michael Mai =

American hammer thrower (born 1977)

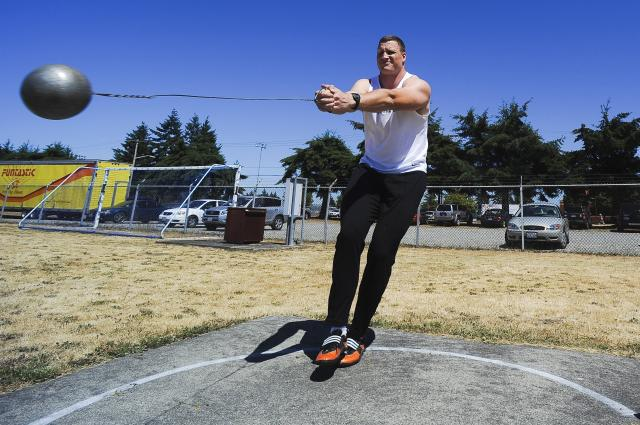

Personal information
- Born: September 27, 1977 (age 48) Le Mars, Iowa
- Height: 6 ft 4 in (193 cm)

Sport
- Country: United States
- Sport: Athletics
- Event: Hammer throw
Medal record
Pan American Games
| Silver medal – second place | 2011 Guadalajara | Hammer throw |

Michael Mai (born September 27, 1977) is a U.S. Army major and former athlete.

An Iowa native, Mai is the second youngest out of six siblings. One of his sisters was an Iowa state champion in the 800 meters and he has a brother who earned two state championships in shot put.

Mai, the 1996 valedictorian at Gehlen Catholic School in Le Mars, Iowa, competed in high school as a discus thrower, with the hammer throw not offered in the Iowa school system. It wasn't until he was at the United States Military Academy, West Point that he began in the hammer throw. He initially played football for the army but had to quit after two seasons due to injury, so decided to return to athletics.

During his career he never found a place on the U.S. Olympic team, but competed twice in hammer throw at the World Championships, in 2009 and 2011. He won a silver medal for the United States at the 2011 Pan American Games. His wife, Deirdre Mullen, competed at the same Pan American Games as a high jumper.

Mai had a personal best throw of 76.28m, set in Provo in 2008. His best indoor throw of 23.91m came at the 2012 national championships, where he finished second behind Olympian A. G. Kruger. He also had a second-place finish at the 2011 USA Outdoor Track and Field Championships.
