= Athletics at the 2023 Pan American Games – Men's hammer throw =

Men's hammer throw at the 2023 Pan American Games
- Venue: Julio Martínez National Stadium
- Dates: November 4
- Competitors: 11 from 9 nations
- Winning distance: 80.96

Medalists
| Gold medal | Ethan Katzberg | Canada |
| Silver medal | Daniel Haugh | United States |
| Bronze medal | Rudy Winkler | United States |

The men's hammer throw competition of the athletics events at the 2023 Pan American Games was held on November 4 at the Julio Martínez National Stadium of Santiago, Chile.

== Records ==
Prior to this competition, the existing world and Pan American Games records were as follows:

| World record | Yuriy Sedykh (URS) | 86.74 | Stuttgart, West Germany | August 30, 1986 |
| Pan American Games record | Johnson Kibwe (USA) | 79.63 | Guadalajara, Mexico | October 26, 2011 |

== Schedule ==
| Date | Time | Round |
|---|---|---|
| November 4, 2023 | 18:30 | Final |

== Results ==
All times shown are in seconds.

| KEY: | NR | National record | PB | Personal best | SB | Seasonal best | DQ | Disqualified |

=== Final ===
The results were as follows:

| Rank | Name | Nationality | #1 | #2 | #3 | #4 | #5 | #6 | Mark | Notes |
|---|---|---|---|---|---|---|---|---|---|---|
| 1st place, gold medalist(s) | Ethan Katzberg | Canada | 80.02 | X | 78.31 | 80.92 | 80.96 | 80.00 | 80.96 | GR |
| 2nd place, silver medalist(s) | Daniel Haugh | United States | 77.18 | 76.11 | 76.90 | 75.88 | 76.70 | 77.62 | 77.62 | |
| 3rd place, bronze medalist(s) | Rudy Winkler | United States | X | X | 72.78 | X | 76.65 | X | 76.65 | |
| 4 | Diego del Real | Mexico | 73.87 | 75.59 | 74.82 | 74.36 | 75.63 | 74.79 | 75.63 | |
| 5 | Humberto Mansilla | Chile | 72.95 | X | 73.72 | 70.95 | X | 74.35 | 74.35 | |
| 6 | Gabriel Kehr | Chile | 73.30 | 74.32 | 74.15 | X | 73.02 | X | 74.32 | |
| 7 | Joaquín Gómez | Argentina | 70.23 | 72.36 | 69.94 | X | X | X | 72.36 | |
| 8 | Ronald Mencía | Cuba | X | X | 71.52 | 71.52 | X | X | 71.52 | |
| 9 | Alencar Pereira | Brazil | 67.38 | 70.54 | X | | | | 70.54 | |
| 10 | Carlos Arteaga | Nicaragua | 55.10 | 59.75 | 56.26 | | | | 59.75 | |
| | Jerome Vega | Puerto Rico | X | X | X | | | | NM | |
