= Athletics at the 2010 South American Games – Men's hammer throw =

The Men's Hammer Throw event at the 2010 South American Games was held on March 22 at 18:00.

== Medalists ==
Gold	Silver	Bronze
Allan Wolski; Brazil	Prinston Quailey; Venezuela	Guillermo Braulio; Ecuador

== Records ==
Standing records prior to the 2010 South American Games
World record	Yuriy Sedykh	Soviet Union	86.74m	Stuttgart, Germany	30 August 1986
World Leading	Igors Sokolovs	Latvia	79.09m	Riga, Latvia	6 March 2010
South American record	Juan Ignacio Cerra	Argentina	76.42m	Trieste, Italy	25 July 2001
South American U23 record	Andrés Charadia	Argentina	71.34m	Prague, Czech Republic	17 May 1987

== Results ==
Results were published.

=== Final ===
Rank	Athlete	Nationality	Attempt						Best Result	Notes
Rank	Athlete	Nationality	1	2	3	4	5	6	Best Result	Notes
1st place, gold medalist(s)	Allan Wolski	Brazil	58.75	61.17	57.86	56.73	58.93	x	61.17	
2nd place, silver medalist(s)	Prinston Quailey	Venezuela	57.36	55.98	57.82	57.49	58.16	57.14	58.16	
3rd place, bronze medalist(s)	Guillermo Braulio	Ecuador	54.62	55.93	x	54.10	x	54.69	55.93	
4	Lucas Chareun	Argentina	53.25	x	x	x	55.09	x	55.09	
5	Alan Melo	Brazil	50.42	54.87	54.11	x	54.28	x	54.87	
6	Luciano del Rio	Argentina	51.74	x	53.29	51.22	52.10	51.58	53.29	
7	Fabián Serna	Colombia	44.79	x	51.71	50.36	x	x	51.71	

== See also ==
- 2010 South American Under-23 Championships in Athletics
