= Roberto Sawyers =

Costa Rican athletics competitor

Personal information
- Born: October 17, 1986 (age 39)
- Height: 1.82 m (5 ft 11 1/2 in)
- Weight: 111 kg (245 lb)

Sport
- Country: Costa Rica
- Sport: Athletics
- Event: Hammer throw

Roberto Sawyers Furtado (born 17 October 1986) is a Costa Rican athlete competing primarily in the hammer throw and occasionally in the shot put and discus throw. He has won multiple medals at the regional level. In addition, he competed at three consecutive Pan American Games.

His personal best in the event is 77.15 metres set in Liberec in 2016. This is the current national record.

== Competition record ==
Year	Competition	Venue	Position	Event	Notes
Representing Costa Rica
2004	Central American and Caribbean; Junior Championships (U20)	Coatzacoalcos, Mexico	2nd	Hammer (6 kg)	57.56 m
2004	Central American Championships	Managua, Nicaragua	3rd	Shot put	13.55 m
2004	Central American Championships	Managua, Nicaragua	3rd	Discus	39.15 m
2004	Central American Championships	Managua, Nicaragua	2nd	Hammer	47.20 m
2005	Central American Championships	San José, Costa Rica	3rd	Shot put	13.02 m
2005	Central American Championships	San José, Costa Rica	2nd	Hammer	54.20 m
2005	Pan American Junior Athletics Championships	Windsor, Canada	6th	Hammer (6 kg)	59.07 m
2006	NACAC U23 Championships	San Salvador, El Salvador	9th	Hammer	50.34 m
2007	Central American Championships	San José, Costa Rica	1st	Discus	44.87 m
2007	Central American Championships	San José, Costa Rica	1st	Hammer	62.42 m
2007	NACAC Championships	San Salvador, El Salvador	3rd	Hammer	61.98 m
2007	Pan American Games	Rio de Janeiro, Brazil	12th	Hammer	57.45 m
2009	Central American Championships	Guatemala City, Guatemala	2nd	Shot put	14.68 m
2009	Central American Championships	Guatemala City, Guatemala	1st	Discus	48.39 m
2009	Central American Championships	Guatemala City, Guatemala	2nd	Hammer	64.13 m
2009	Central American and Caribbean Championships	Havana, Cuba	5th	Hammer	63.88 m
2010	Ibero-American Championships	San Fernando, Spain	10th	Hammer	62.54 m
2010	Central American and Caribbean Games	Mayagüez, Puerto Rico	4th	Hammer	62.08 m
2011	Central American Championships	San José, Costa Rica	1st	Shot put	15.68 m
2011	Central American Championships	San José, Costa Rica	1st	Discus	48.16 m
2011	Central American Championships	San José, Costa Rica	1st	Hammer	65.38 m
2011	Central American and Caribbean Championships	Mayagüez, Puerto Rico	2nd	Hammer	65.96 m
2011	Pan American Games	Guadalajara, Mexico	7th	Hammer	65.09 m
2012	Central American Championships	Managua, Nicaragua	2nd	Shot put	14.64 m
2012	Central American Championships	Managua, Nicaragua	2nd	Discus	49.54 m
2012	Central American Championships	Managua, Nicaragua	1st	Hammer	67.71 m
2012	Ibero-American Championships	Barquisimeto, Venezuela	4th	Hammer	67.99 m
2013	Central American Games	San José, Costa Rica	2nd	Shot put	15.24 m
2013	Central American Games	San José, Costa Rica	2nd	Discus	46.93 m
2013	Central American and Caribbean Championships	Morelia, Mexico	1st	Hammer	68.92 m
2014	Ibero-American Championships	São Paulo, Brazil	4th	Hammer	69.11 m
2014	Pan American Sports Festival	Mexico City, Mexico	2nd	Hammer	73.85 m
2014	Central American and Caribbean Games	Xalapa, Mexico	3rd	Hammer	70.66 m
2015	Pan American Games	Toronto, Canada	7th	Hammer	70.95 m
2015	NACAC Championships	San José, Costa Rica	5th	Hammer	70.42 m
2015	World Championships	Beijing, China	30th (q)	Hammer	66.64 m
2016	Ibero-American Championships	Rio de Janeiro, Brazil	2nd	Hammer	72.15 m
2016	Olympic Games	Rio de Janeiro, Brazil	24th (q)	Hammer	70.08 m
2018	Central American and Caribbean Games	Barranquilla, Colombia	4th	Hammer	71.98 m
2018	NACAC Championships	Toronto, Canada	1st	Hammer	72.94 m
2018	Ibero-American Championships	Trujillo, Peru	3rd	Hammer	73.16 m
2019	Pan American Games	Lima, Peru	9th	Hammer	70.25 m
2019	World Championships	Doha, Qatar	26th (q)	Hammer	72.41 m
