= Daniel Haugh =

American hammer thrower (born 1995)

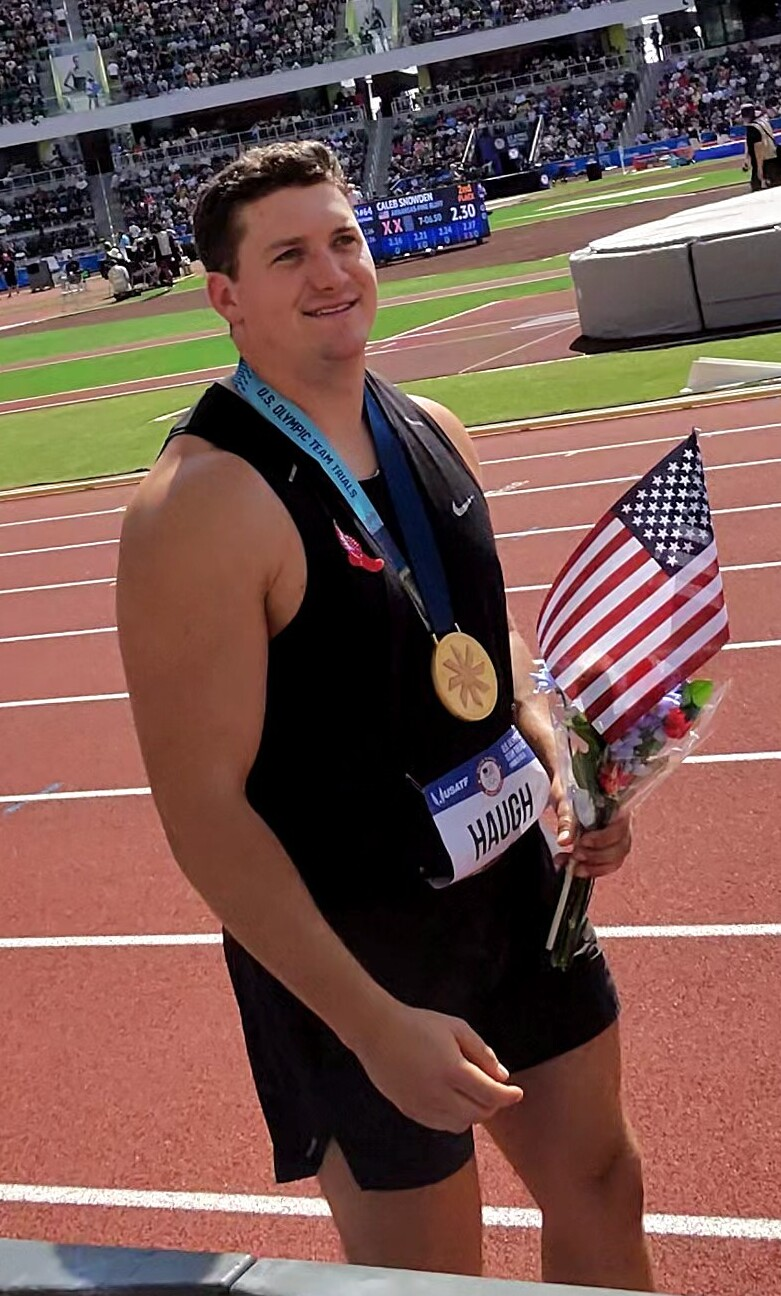
- Haugh in 2024

Personal information
- Citizenship: United States
- Born: May 3, 1995 (age 31) Marietta, Georgia, U.S.

Sport
- Country: United States
- Sport: Track and field
- Event: Hammer throw

Achievements and titles
- National finals: 2014 USA U20s; • Discus throw, 5th; • Hammer throw, 10th; 2016 NCAAs; • Discus throw, NM; 2017 NCAA Indoors; • Weight throw, 9th; 2018 NCAA Indoors; • Weight throw, 4th; 2018 NCAAs; • Hammer throw, 5th; • Discus throw, 11th; 2018 USA Champs; • Hammer throw, 7th; 2019 USA Indoors; • Weight throw, 1st (gold); 2019 NCAAs; • Hammer throw, 1st (gold); 2019 USA Champs; • Hammer throw, 3rd (bronze); 2020 USA Indoors; • Weight throw, 2nd (silver); 2021 USA Champs; • Hammer throw, 2nd (silver); 2022 USA Indoors; • Weight throw, 2nd (silver); 2022 USA Champs; • Hammer throw, 1st (gold); 2023 USA Indoors; • Weight throw, 1st (gold); 2023 USA Champs; • Hammer throw, 2nd (silver); 2024 USA Indoors; • Weight throw, 1st (gold)
Medal record
Men's athletics
Representing United States
NACAC Championships
Gold medal – first place	2025 Freeport	Discus throw
Pan American Games
Silver medal – second place	2023 Santiago	Hammer throw

Daniel Haugh (/ˈhɔː/ HAW; born May 3, 1995) is an American track and field athlete competing in the hammer throw. He competed in the men's hammer throw event at the 2020 Summer Olympics held in Tokyo, Japan.

Competing for the Kennesaw State Owls track and field team, he won the gold medal in the men's hammer throw event at the 2019 NCAA Division I Outdoor Track and Field Championships. In 2019, he also represented the United States in The Match Europe v USA where he finished in 5th place in the men's hammer throw event.

In that same year, he competed in the men's hammer throw at the 2019 World Athletics Championships held in Doha, Qatar. He did not qualify to compete in the final.
