= Allan Wolski =

Brazilian hammer thrower (born 1990)

Personal information
- Born: January 18, 1990 (age 36) São Paulo, Brazil
- Height: 1.86 m (6 ft 1 in)
- Weight: 125 kg (276 lb)

Sport
- Sport: Athletics
- Event: Hammer throw
- Club: Esporte Clube Pinheiros

Allan da Silva Wolski (born 18 January 1990) is a Brazilian athlete specialising in the hammer throw.

His personal best in the event is 75,22 metres set in São Bernardo do Campo in 2015.

== Competition record ==
Year	Competition	Venue	Position	Event	Notes
Representing Brazil
2008	South American U23 Championships	Lima, Peru	2nd	Hammer throw	56.30 m
2009	South American Championships	Lima, Peru	7th	Hammer throw	60.38 m
2009	South American Junior Championships	São Paulo, Brazil	1st	Hammer throw (6 kg)	64.98 m
2009	Pan American Junior Championships	Port of Spain, Trinidad and Tobago	1st	Hammer throw (6 kg)	65.37 m
2010	South American Games / South American U23 Championships	Medellín, Colombia	1st	Hammer throw	61.17 m
2011	South American Championships	Buenos Aires, Argentina	3rd	Hammer throw	66.85 m
2012	South American U23 Championships	São Paulo, Brazil	1st	Hammer throw	63.20 m
2013	South American Championships	Cartagena, Colombia	3rd	Hammer throw	66.25 m
2014	South American Games	Santiago, Chile	7th	Hammer throw	62.90 m
2014	Ibero-American Championships	São Paulo, Brazil	2nd	Hammer throw	70.81 m
2015	South American Championships	Lima, Peru	2nd	Hammer throw	69.82 m
2015	Pan American Games	Toronto, Canada	5th	Hammer throw	72.72 m
2016	Ibero-American Championships	Rio de Janeiro, Brazil	3rd	Hammer throw	71.69 m
2017	South American Championships	Asunción, Paraguay	3rd	Hammer throw	71.38 m
2017	World Championships	London, United Kingdom	19th (q)	Hammer throw	72.51 m
2018	South American Games	Cochabamba, Bolivia	5th	Hammer throw	71.51 m
2019	South American Championships	Lima, Peru	3rd	Hammer throw	72.51 m
2019	Pan American Games	Lima, Peru	6th	Hammer throw	73.25 m
2021	South American Championships	Guayaquil, Ecuador	4th	Hammer throw	70.71 m
2022	Ibero-American Championships	La Nucía, Spain	4th	Hammer throw	72.24 m
2022	World Championships	Eugene, United States	26th (q)	Hammer throw	71.27 m
2022	South American Games	Asunción, Paraguay	4th	Hammer throw	70.54 m
2023	South American Championships	São Paulo, Brazil	4th	Hammer throw	69.58 m
2024	Ibero-American Championships	Cuiabá, Brazil	5th	Hammer throw	71.89 m
2025	South American Championships	Mar del Plata, Argentina	5th	Hammer throw	71.97 m
2026	Ibero-American Championships	Lima, Peru	8th	Hammer throw	67.31 m
