= Taylor Campbell =

English hammer thrower (born 1996)

Personal information
- Born: 30 June 1996 (age 30) Slough, England
- Education: Loughborough University
- Height: 1.94 m (6 ft 4 in)
- Weight: 115 kg (254 lb)

Sport
- Sport: Athletics
- Event: Hammer throw
- Club: Windsor, Slough, Eton and Hounslow AC; City of Sheffield and Dearne AC
- Coached by: John Pearson (2016–); Paul Dickenson (2011–2016); Jamie Bath (–2011)
Medal record
Representing Great Britain
Summer Universiade
Bronze medal – third place	2019 Naples	Hammer Throw

Taylor Campbell (born 30 June 1996) is an English athlete specialising in the hammer throw. He finished fourth at the 2017 European U23 Championships and fifth at the 2018 Commonwealth Games. In addition, he won a bronze at the 2019 Summer Universiade.

== Biography ==
Campbell represented England at the 2018 Commonwealth Games in Gold Coast.

His personal best in the event is 74.98 m set in Loughborough 2020, improved with 76.97 m at the same venue on 23 May 2021. He then realised 78.23 metres at Grosics Gyula Stadion, Tatabánya, on 5 June 2021.

Campbell became the British hammer throw champion after winning the British Athletics Championships in 2021.

== International competitions ==
Year	Competition	Venue	Position	Event	Notes
Representing Great Britain and England
2013	World Youth Championships	Donetsk, Ukraine	14th (q)	Hammer throw (5 kg)	71.49 m
2014	World Junior Championships	Eugene, United States	9th	Hammer throw (6 kg)	73.12 m
2015	European Junior Championships	Eskilstuna, Sweden	6th	Hammer throw (6 kg)	75.63 m
2017	European U23 Championships	Bydgoszcz, Poland	4th	Hammer throw	70.59 m
2018	Commonwealth Games	Gold Coast, Australia	5th	Hammer throw	72.03 m
2019	Universiade	Naples, Italy	3rd	Hammer throw	73.86 m
2021	Olympic Games	Tokyo, Japan	28th (q)	Hammer throw	71.34 m
