= Hungary at the 2019 World Athletics Championships =

Hungary at the 2019 World Championships in Athletics
- WA code: HUN
- National federation: Magyar Atlétikai Szövetség
- Website: http://www.masz.hu/

in Doha, Qatar 27 September 2019 – 6 October 2019
- Competitors: 17 (7 men and 10 women) in 13 events
- Medals Ranked 31st: Gold 0 Silver 0 Bronze 1 Total 1

World Championships in Athletics appearances
- 1976; 1980; 1983; 1987; 1991; 1993; 1995; 1997; 1999; 2001; 2003; 2005; 2007; 2009; 2011; 2013; 2015; 2017; 2019; 2022; 2023; 2025

Hungary competed at the 2019 World Championships in Athletics in Doha, Qatar, from 27 September to 6 October 2019. Hungary was represented by 17 athletes.

== Medalists ==
| Medal | Name | Event | Date |
|---|---|---|---|
| Bronze | Bence Halász | Hammer throw | October 2 |

== Results ==
Key

- Q = Qualified for the next round
- q = Qualified for the next round as a fastest loser or, in field events, by position without achieving the qualifying target
- NR = National record
- PB = Personal best
- SB = Season best
- NM = No mark
- N/A = Round not applicable for the event

=== Men ===
Track and road events

| Athlete | Event | Heat | | Semifinal | | Final | |
| Athlete | Event | Result | Rank | Result | Rank | Result | Rank |
|---|---|---|---|---|---|---|---|
| Valdó Szűcs | 110 metres hurdles | 13.60 | 22 | Did not advance | | | |
| Máté Helebrandt | 50 kilometres walk | —N/a | | | | DNF | |
| Bence Venyercsán | 50 kilometres walk | —N/a | | | | 4:45:04 | 26 |

Field events

| Athlete | Event | Qualification | | Final | |
| Athlete | Event | Distance | Position | Distance | Position |
|---|---|---|---|---|---|
| János Huszák | Discus throw | 60.45 | 28 | Did not advance | |
| Bence Halász | Hammer throw | 76.90 | 6 Q | 78.18 | 3rd place, bronze medalist(s) |
| Krisztián Pars | Hammer throw | 73.05 | 22 | Did not advance | |
| Norbert Rivasz-Tóth | Javelin throw | 83.42 | 9 Q | 79.73 | 9 |

=== Women ===
Track and road events

| Athlete | Event | Heat | | Semifinal | | Final | |
| Athlete | Event | Result | Rank | Result | Rank | Result | Rank |
|---|---|---|---|---|---|---|---|
| Gréta Kerekes | 100 metres hurdles | 13.11 | 24 | Did not advance | | | |
| Luca Kozák | 100 metres hurdles | 13.00 | 21 Q | 12.87 | 13 | Did not advance | |
| Viktória Gyürkés | 3000 metres steeplechase | 9:52.11 | 37 | —N/a | | Did not advance | |
| Viktória Madarász | 20 kilometres walk | —N/a | | | | 1:47:38 | 39 |

Field events

| Athlete | Event | Qualification | | Final | |
| Athlete | Event | Distance | Position | Distance | Position |
|---|---|---|---|---|---|
| Petra Farkas | Long jump | 6.44 | 23 | Did not advance | |
| Anasztázia Nguyen | Long jump | 6.54 | 11 Q | 6.26 | 12 |
| Réka Gyurátz | Hammer throw | 67.41 | 23 | Did not advance | |
| Anita Márton | Shot put | 18.44 | 9 Q | 18.86 | 5 |
| Réka Szilágyi | Javelin throw | 56.26 | 25 | Did not advance | |
