= Chile at the 2011 World Championships in Athletics =

- WA code: CHI
- National federation: Federación Atlética de Chile
- Website: www.fedachi.cl/web/

in Daegu
- Competitors: 3
- Medals: Gold 0 Silver 0 Bronze 0 Total 0

World Championships in Athletics appearances
- 1983; 1987; 1991; 1993; 1995; 1997; 1999; 2001; 2003; 2005; 2007; 2009; 2011; 2013; 2015; 2017; 2019; 2022; 2023

Chile competed at the 2011 World Championships in Athletics from August 27 to September 4 in Daegu, South Korea. A team of 3 "athletes" was announced to represent the country in the event.

== Results ==
=== Men ===
Athlete	Event	Preliminaries		Heats		Semifinals		Final	
Athlete	Event	Time Width Height	Rank	Time Width Height	Rank	Time Width Height	Rank	Time Width Height	Rank
Yerko Araya	20 kilometres walk							1:27:47	33

=== Women ===
Athlete	Event	Preliminaries		Heats		Semifinals		Final	
Athlete	Event	Time Width Height	Rank	Time Width Height	Rank	Time Width Height	Rank	Time Width Height	Rank
Natalia Ducó	Shot put	17.42	20					Did not advance	
Karen Gallardo	Discus throw	53.69	24					Did not advance	
