= Noleysi Bicet =

Cuban hammer thrower (born 1981)

Personal information
- Full name: Noleysis Bicet Juan
- Born: 6 February 1981 (age 45) Santiago de Cuba, Cuba
- Height: 1.93 m (6 ft 4 in)
- Weight: 103 kg (227 lb)

Sport
- Country: Cuba
- Sport: Athletics
Medal record
Representing Cuba
Pan American Games
Bronze medal – third place	2011 Guadalajara	Hammer throw
Central American and Caribbean Games
Gold medal – first place	2006 Cartagena	Hammer throw
- Updated on 1 June 2013

Noleysi Bicet (or Noleysis Vicet, born 6 February 1981) is a Cuban hammer thrower. His personal best throw is 75.40 metres, achieved in May 2011 in Havana.

He won the gold medal at the 2006 Central American and Caribbean Games. He also became Cuban champion in 2006.

== Personal best ==
- Hammer throw: 75.40 – Havana, Cuba, 20 May 2011

== Achievements ==
Year	Competition	Venue	Position	Event	Notes
Representing Cuba
2005	ALBA Games	Havana, Cuba	3rd	Hammer throw	71.35 m
2006	Central American and Caribbean Games	Cartagena, Colombia	1st	Hammer throw	69.56 m
2007	ALBA Games	Caracas, Venezuela	1st	Hammer throw	70.74 m
2007	Pan American Games	Rio de Janeiro, Brazil	6th	Hammer throw	67.51 m
2008	Central American and Caribbean Championships	Cali, Colombia	1st	Hammer throw	71.61 m A
2009	ALBA Games	Havana, Cuba	1st	Hammer throw	70.88 m
2009	Central American and Caribbean Championships	Havana, Cuba	2nd	Hammer throw	72.46 m
2011	ALBA Games	Barquisimeto, Venezuela	1st	Hammer throw	71.14 m
2011	Pan American Games	Guadalajara, Mexico	3rd	Hammer throw	72.57 m A
