= Ciudad Jardín Bicentenario =

Sports and shopping complex in Mexico

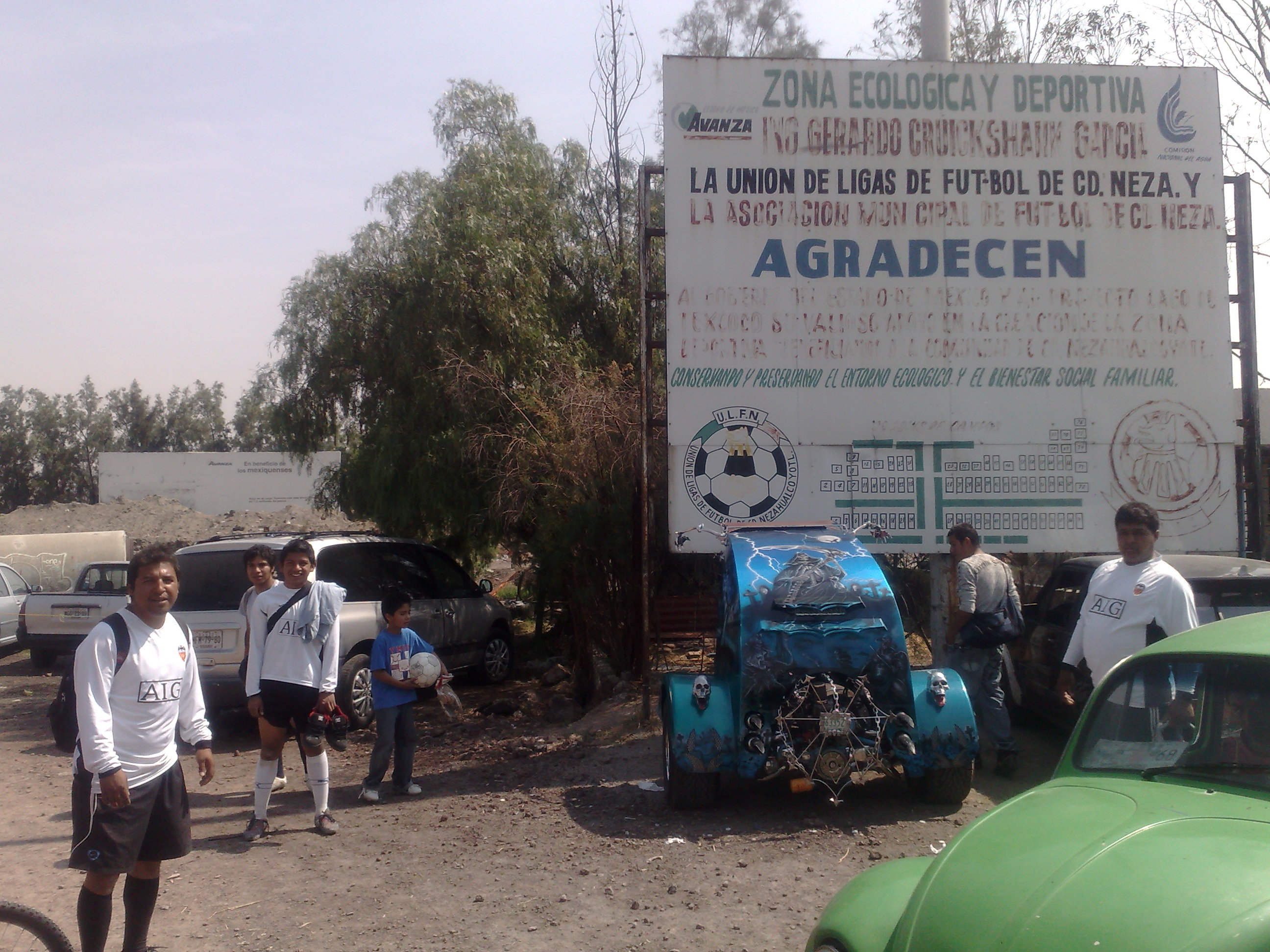
Entrance to the sports area of Ciudad Jardín

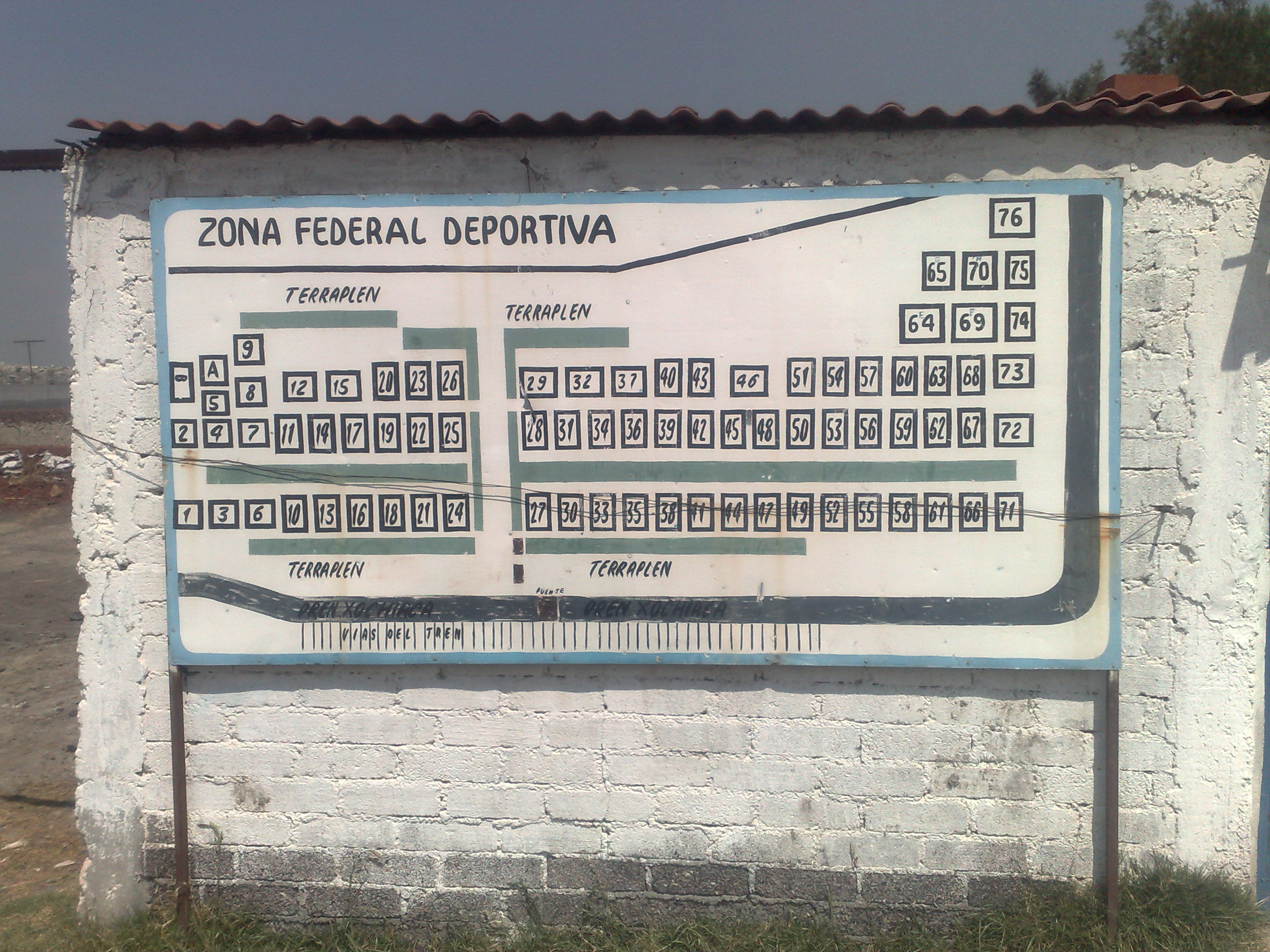
Map for the football courts in Ciudad Jardín

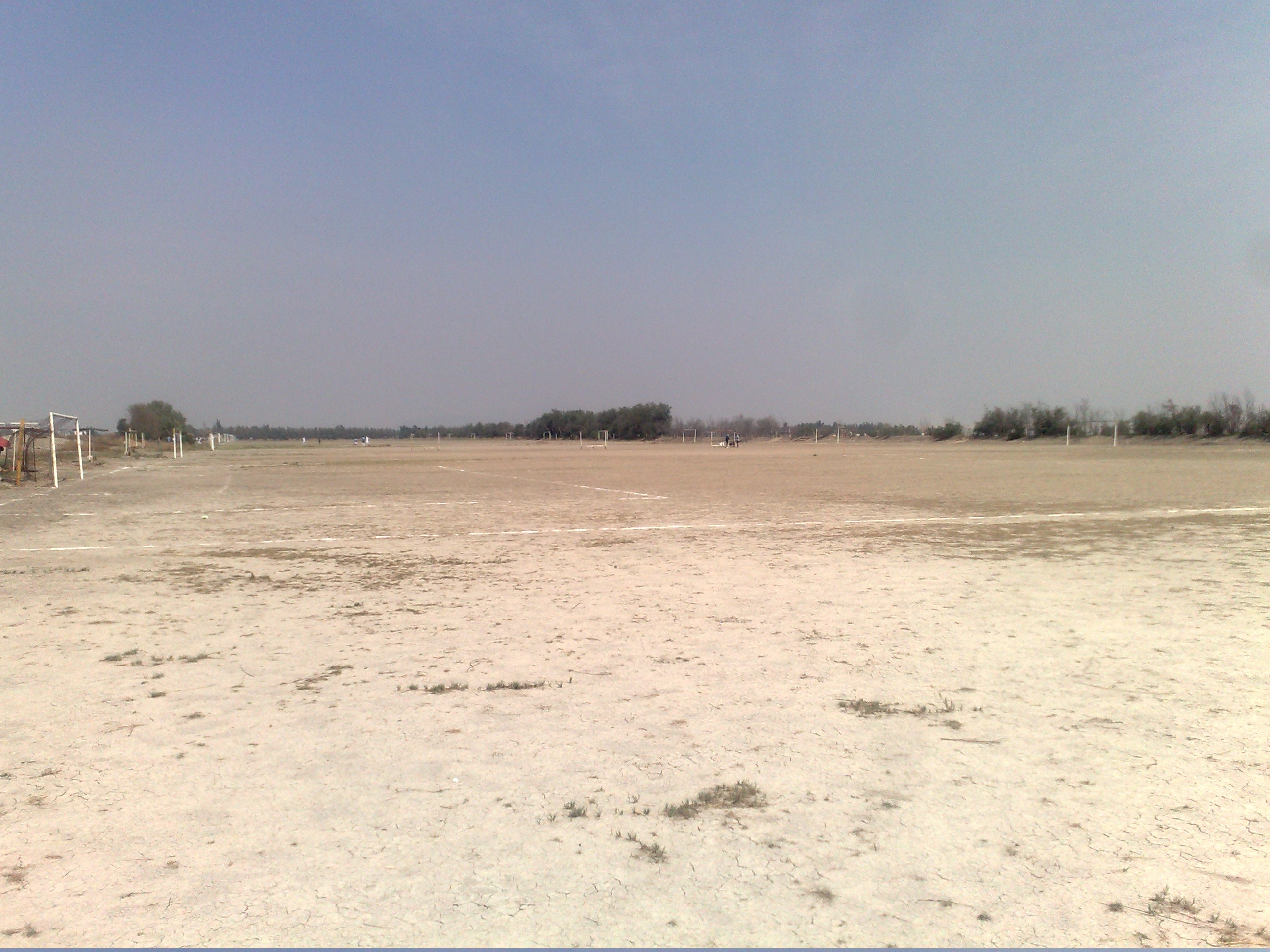
Landscape in the sports area

Ciudad Jardín Bicentenario, also known as Ciudad Jardín, is a sports and shopping complex in Ciudad Nezahualcóyotl ("Neza"), State of Mexico, part of Greater Mexico City. Opened in May 2009, it was developed on 250 hectares (620 acres) of what were the Neza I y II landfills, which in their 65 years of history received over 12,000 tonnes (13,000 short tons) of garbage from Mexico City. On 60 hectares (150 acres) a sports center was built, the largest in Greater Mexico City. On the second lot, a shopping center was built, inaugurated in late 2008, as well as a higher education institute, a hospital, medical offices, a community center and an entertainment area.

== History ==
=== Development ===
In the early decade of the 2000s, ideas were raised as to how to transform one of the largest landfills in the Americas into a center for shopping, ecology, education, and living, in the way that had already been accomplished in Santa Fe, Mexico City. Municipal and state authorities as well as private investors supported the idea.

About 200 million dollars in private capital was invested, 70% of which was that of Promotora Sanborn's and Constructora IDEAL (Impulsora para el Desarrollo y el Empleo en América Latina), both companies headed up by billionaire Carlos Slim Helú. Of the 200 million USD, about 400 million Mexican pesos went to build the sports complex.

Ciudad Jardín was opened by the State of Mexico governor (later Mexican president) Enrique Peña Nieto and by Slim on 22 May 2009.

=== Current ===
As of June 2013, it is reported that since 2009 the sports complex has been closed. The city of Neza is trying to gain control from the controlling Board of Trustees.

== Name ==
The name celebrates the Mexican bicentennial in 2010, as the complex was expected to be complete by that year.

== Shopping center ==
The shopping center in 2026

The shopping center areas have a total land area of 88,457 square metres (952,140 sq ft) and a total 175,635 square metres (1,890,520 sq ft) of built-up area. It is divided into two sections, 'Plaza Ciudad Jardín" and "Centro Comercial Ciudad Jardín", where two retail groups predominate: Wal-Mart with a Wal-Mart and Sams Club, restaurants Vips and El Portón and department store Suburbia; while Grupo Carso has Sears, Mixup and Sanborns. There are 194 stores and parking for 3750 cars.

== Ciudad Deportiva ==
The Sports Center covers 60 hectares (150 acres) and has 41 fields and courts: 25 soccer fields, five for indoor soccer, two American football fields, four tennis courts, four basketball courts, four volleyball courts, two jai alai courts, two baseball fields, an aerobics floor, playgrounds and recreational areas. It also contains a nearly Olympic-sized stadium, a cycling track and two gymnasiums. However, as of January 2010, it is closed to the public because state and municipal authorities have not regularized the title of the land on which it sits. Entrance to the facilities will be free, due to corporate sponsorship to cover administrative costs.

== Other amenities ==
Universidad La Salle and Universidad Autónoma del Estado de México have a presence here as well as a Rehabilitation center for Teletón México. The center is planned to be connected to route 3 of the Ferrocarril Suburbano de la Zona Metropolitana del Valle de México (suburban rail system) a line that should connect metro station Metro Nezahualcoyotl with Chalco.
