= Wagner Domingos =

Brazilian hammer thrower

Personal information
- Full name: Wagner José Alberto Carvalho Domingos
- Nickname: Montanha
- Born: March 26, 1983 (age 43) Recife, Pernambuco, Brazil
- Height: 1.87 m (6 ft 2 in)
- Weight: 118 kg (260 lb)

Sport
- Country: Brazil
- Sport: Athletics
- Event: Hammer throw
- Coached by: Abrão Nascimento; Pedro Rivail Atílio
- Updated on 25 January 2015

Wagner José Alberto Carvalho Domingos (born 26 March 1983 in Recife) is a Brazilian athlete specializing in the hammer throw. His personal best of 78.63 metres (2016) is the current South American record.

In the first half of 2016, Domingos broke 3 times the Brazilian record of Hammer Throw: launched the hammer to 75,60m in May in Zagreb; 75,62m in Varazdin, and 76,12m in Zagreb again. The first time he broke the Brazilian record in 2005, the best mark in the country was 66,30m. Until then, the record was not improved since 1978.

On June 20, 2016, he finally broke the South American record for the hammer throw with 78,63m. The South American record was 76.42m, belonged to the Argentine Juan Cerra until 2006. Brazil again had a representative at the Olympic Games in this event, which has not happened since Carmine Di Giorgi played it in Los Angeles 1932.

In December 2012, he married javelin thrower Laila Ferrer e Silva.

== Personal best ==
- Hammer throw: 78.63 m – (Slovenia) Celje, 19 June 2016

== Competition record ==
Year	Competition	Venue	Position	Event	Notes
Representing Brazil
2000	South American Youth Championships	Bogotá, Colombia	4th	Hammer throw (5 kg)	58.39 m
2001	South American Junior Championships	Santa Fe, Argentina	5th	Hammer throw (6 kg)	50.14 m
2002	South American Junior Championships / South American Games	Belém, Brazil	3rd	Hammer throw (6 kg)	65.15 m
2004	South American U23 Championships	Barquisimeto, Venezuela	2nd	Hammer throw	63.86 m
2005	South American Championships	Cali, Colombia	2nd	Hammer throw	67.33 m
2006	Ibero-American Championships	Ponce, Puerto Rico	3rd	Hammer throw	66.06 m
2006	South American Championships	Tunja, Colombia	3rd	Hammer throw	67.27 m
2007	South American Championships	São Paulo, Brazil	3rd	Hammer throw	65.15 m
2007	Pan American Games	Rio de Janeiro, Brazil	7th	Hammer throw	65.27 m
2008	Ibero-American Championships	Iquique, Chile	5th	Hammer throw	66.24 m
2009	South American Championships	Lima, Peru	4th	Hammer throw	67.10 m
2010	Ibero-American Championships	San Fernando, Spain	3rd	Hammer throw	70.95 m
2011	South American Championships	Buenos Aires, Argentina	2nd	Hammer throw	70.65 m
2011	Pan American Games	Guadalajara, Mexico	4th	Hammer throw	70.16 m
2012	Ibero-American Championships	Barquisimeto, Venezuela	2nd	Hammer throw	71.91 m
2013	South American Championships	Cartagena, Colombia	1st	Hammer throw	71.36 m
2014	South American Games	Santiago, Chile	1st	Hammer throw	70.62 m
2014	Ibero-American Championships	São Paulo, Brazil	1st	Hammer throw	74.12 m
2014	Pan American Sports Festival	Mexico City, Mexico	3rd	Hammer throw	73.77m A
2015	South American Championships	Lima, Peru	1st	Hammer throw	71.47 m
2015	Pan American Games	Toronto, Canada	4th	Hammer throw	73.74 m
2015	World Championships	Beijing, China	22nd (q)	Hammer throw	71.82 m
2016	Ibero-American Championships	Rio de Janeiro, Brazil	1st	Hammer throw	72.18 m
2016	Olympic Games	Rio de Janeiro, Brazil	12th	Hammer throw	72.28 m
2017	South American Championships	Asunción, Paraguay	1st	Hammer throw	73.79 m
2017	World Championships	London, United Kingdom	24th (q)	Hammer throw	71.69 m
2018	South American Games	Cochabamba, Bolivia	3rd	Hammer throw	72.53 m
2019	South American Championships	Lima, Peru	5th	Hammer throw	69.85 m
