= Chile at the 2013 World Championships in Athletics =

- WA code: CHI
- National federation: Federacion Atletica de Chile
- Website: www.fedachi.cl/web/

in Moscow
- Competitors: 7
- Medals: Gold 0 Silver 0 Bronze 0 Total 0

World Championships in Athletics appearances
- 1983; 1987; 1991; 1993; 1995; 1997; 1999; 2001; 2003; 2005; 2007; 2009; 2011; 2013; 2015; 2017; 2019; 2022; 2023

Chile competed at the 2013 World Championships in Athletics in Moscow, Russia, from 10–18 August 2013. A team of 7 athletes was announced to represent the country in the event.

== Results ==
(q – qualified, NM – no mark, SB – season best)

=== Men ===
| Athlete | Event | Preliminaries | | Heats | | Semifinals | | Final | |
| Athlete | Event | Time | Rank | Time | Rank | Time | Rank | Time | Rank |
|---|---|---|---|---|---|---|---|---|---|
| Yerko Araya | 20 kilometres walk | | | | | | | 1:24:42 | 22 |
| Edward Araya | 50 kilometres walk | | | | | | | DSQ | |

=== Women ===
Track and road events

| Athlete | Event | Preliminaries | | Heats | | Semifinals | | Final | |
| Athlete | Event | Time | Rank | Time | Rank | Time | Rank | Time | Rank |
|---|---|---|---|---|---|---|---|---|---|
| Isidora Jiménez | 200 metres | | | 24.06 | 40 | did not advance | | | |
| Erika Olivera | Marathon | | | | | | | DNF | |

Field events

| Athlete | Event | Preliminaries | | Final | |
| Athlete | Event | Width Height | Rank | Width Height | Rank |
|---|---|---|---|---|---|
| Macarena Reyes | Long jump | 5.93 | 29 | did not advance | |
| Natalia Ducó | Shot put | 18.28 | 8 q | 18.02 | 11 |
| Karen Gallardo | Discus throw | 57.03 | 18 | did not advance | |
