= Yevgeniy Korotovskiy =

Russian hammer thrower

Yevgeniy Korotovskiy (Russian: Евгений Геннадьевич Коротовский, born 1 June 1992 in Smolensk) is a Russian hammer thrower.

His personal best is of 77.29 m in Sochi, Russia on 24 February 2018. He finished third at the 2019 European Throwing Cup. He qualified as an ANA for the final at the 2019 World Athletics Championships in Doha, where he finished 12th.
