= Hleb Dudarau =

Belarusian hammer thrower

Personal information
- Born: 17 October 1996 (age 29)

Sport
- Country: Belarus
- Sport: Athletics
- Event: Hammer throw
- College team: Kansas Jayhawks

Achievements and titles
- Personal best: 78.29 m (256 ft 10 1/4 in) (2019)

Hleb Aliaksandravich Dudarau (Belarusian: Глеб Аляксандравіч Дудараў; born October 17, 1996), also spelled Gleb Dudarev, is a Belarusian hammer thrower. He represented his home country at the 2018 European Athletics Championships, finishing a meter out of qualifying for the final. His personal best 78.04 m (256 ft 1/4 in), set just three and a half months earlier, would have been the number one qualifier or a bronze medal behind the Polish duo of Wojciech Nowicki and Paweł Fajdek.

Dudarau was an accomplished junior hammer thrower. He holds the national junior record in both the hammer throw and weight throw in his home country. Dudarau competed at the 2019 World University Games hammer throw, where he was 4th.

Belarus has a strong tradition in hammer throw, winning 4 Olympic medals in the 6 Olympics of its existence. Prior to that, as part of the Soviet Union, Belorussian athletes added an additional 6 medals. Hleb came to the US to throw for the University of Kansas using the name Gleb Dudarev. He was the runner-up at the 2019 NCAA Championships.
