= Zakhar Makhrosenka =

Belarusian hammer thrower

Zakhar Makhrosenka (born 10 October 1991) is a Belarusian hammer thrower.

In age-specific categories he won the gold medal at the 2013 European U23 Championships. He also competed at the 2017 World Championships without reaching the final.

His personal best throw is 77.41 metres, achieved in July 2016 in Zhyrovichy.
