= Humberto Mansilla =

Chilean hammer thrower (born 1996)

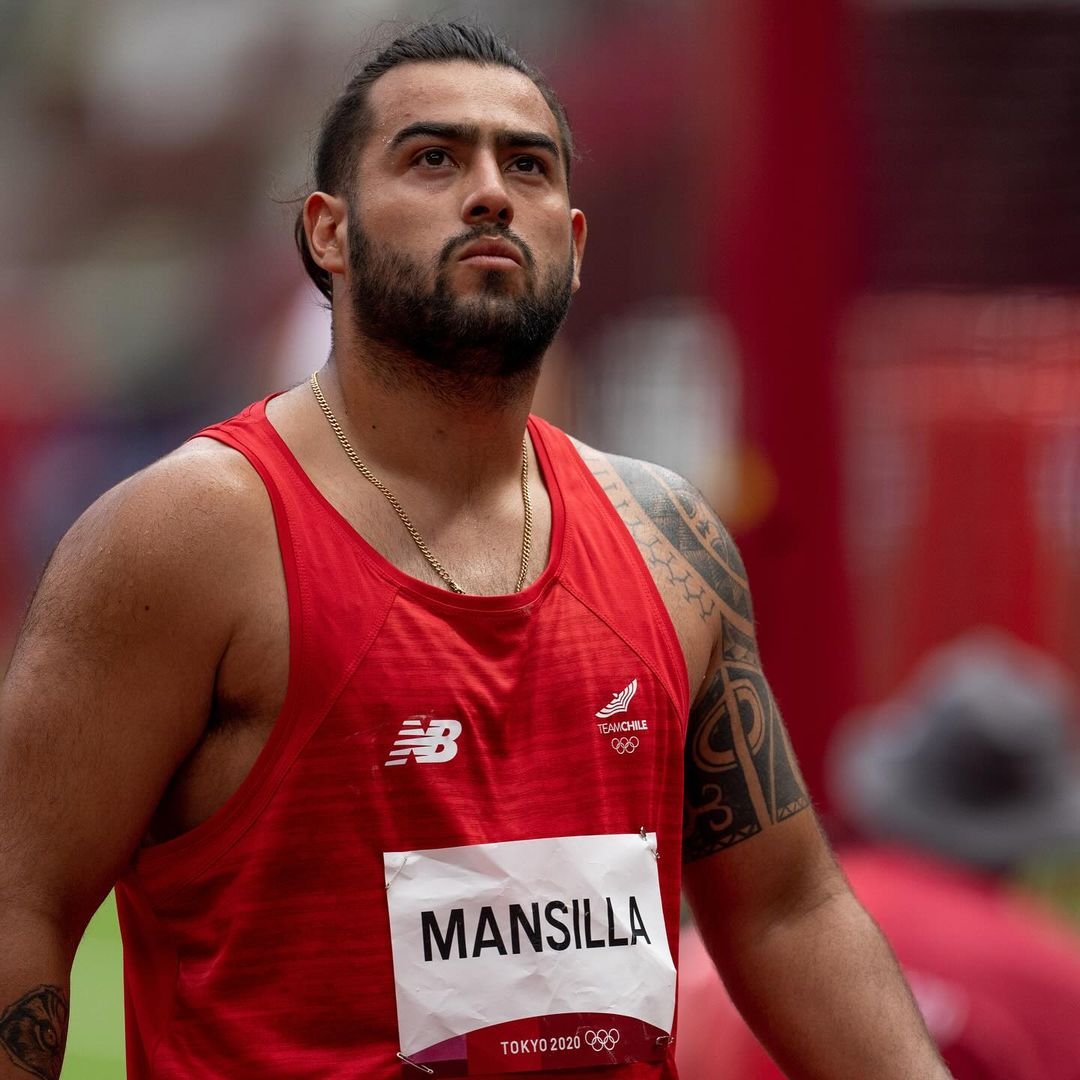
- Mansilla at the 2020 Olympics

Personal information
- Full name: Humberto Fernando Mansilla Arzola
- Born: May 22, 1996 (age 30) Temuco, Chile
- Height: 1.81 m (5 ft 11 in)
- Weight: 110 kg (243 lb)

Sport
- Sport: Athletics
- Event: Hammer throw
Medal record
Representing Chile
Pan American Games
Silver medal – second place	2019 Lima	Hammer throw
Pan American Championships
Gold medal – first place	2026 Medellín	Hammer throw
Ibero-American Championships
Gold medal – first place	2024 Cuiabá	Hammer throw
Gold medal – first place	2026 Lima	Hammer throw
Bronze medal – third place	2022 La Nucía	Hammer throw
South American Games
Gold medal – first place	2026 Santa Fe	Hammer throw
Silver medal – second place	2022 Asunción	Hammer throw
South American Championships
Gold medal – first place	2021 Guayaquil	Hammer throw
Gold medal – first place	2023 São Paulo	Hammer throw
Silver medal – second place	2017 Asunción	Hammer throw
Silver medal – second place	2019 Lima	Hammer throw
Bronze medal – third place	2025 Mar del Plata	Hammer throw

Humberto Fernando Mansilla Arzola (born 22 May 1996) is a Chilean athlete specialising in the hammer throw. He has won multiple medals at regional level including silvers at the 2017 South American Championships and 2018 South American Games.

His personal best in the event is 80.21 metres set in Cuenca in 2018 (6 kg hammer). His current national record is 77.70 m, set in his hometown in 2021.

He represented Chile at the 2020 Summer Olympics.

== International competitions ==
Year	Competition	Venue	Position	Event	Notes
Representing Chile
2012	South American Youth Championships	Mendoza, Argentina	2nd	Hammer throw (5 kg)	66.61 m
2013	World Youth Championships	Donetsk, Ukraine	21st (q)	Hammer throw (5 kg)	70.04 m
2013	Pan American Junior Championships	Medellín, Colombia	3rd	Hammer throw (6 kg)	68.44 m
2013	South American Junior Championships	Resistencia, Argentina	3rd	Hammer throw (6 kg)	66.82 m
2014	South American Games	Santiago, Chile	6th	Hammer throw	63.96 m
2014	World Junior Championships	Eugene, United States	16th (q)	Hammer throw (6 kg)	71.28 m
2014	Pan American Sports Festival	Mexico City, Mexico	6th	Hammer throw	64.20 m
2014	South American U23 Championships	Montevideo, Uruguay	2nd	Hammer throw	65.27 m
2015	South American Junior Championships	Cuenca, Ecuador	2nd	Hammer throw (6 kg)	78.69 m
2015	South American Championships	Lima, Peru	4th	Hammer throw	66.83 m
2015	Pan American Games	Toronto, Canada	10th	Hammer throw	66.14 m
2015	Pan American Junior Championships	Edmonton, Canada	1st	Hammer throw (6 kg)	80.21 m
2016	Ibero-American Championships	Rio de Janeiro, Brazil	4th	Hammer throw	68.15 m
2016	South American U23 Championships	Lima, Peru	1st	Hammer throw	72.67 m
2017	South American Championships	Asunción, Paraguay	2nd	Hammer throw	73.16 m
2018	South American Games	Cochabamba, Bolivia	2nd	Hammer throw	74.71 m
2018	Ibero-American Championships	Trujillo, Peru	4th	Hammer throw	72.60 m
2018	South American U23 Championships	Cuenca, Ecuador	1st	Hammer throw	76.87 m
2019	South American Championships	Lima, Peru	2nd	Hammer throw	73.00 m
2019	Pan American Games	Lima, Peru	2nd	Hammer throw	74.38 m
2019	World Championships	Doha, Qatar	25th (q)	Hammer throw	72.68 m
2021	South American Championships	Guayaquil, Ecuador	1st	Hammer throw	75.83 m
2021	Olympic Games	Tokyo, Japan	17th (q)	Hammer throw	74.76 m
2022	Ibero-American Championships	La Nucía, Spain	3rd	Hammer throw	73.14 m
2022	World Championships	Eugene, United States	10th	Hammer throw	73.91 m
2022	South American Games	Asunción, Paraguay	2nd	Hammer throw	74.12 m
2023	South American Championships	São Paulo, Brazil	1st	Hammer throw	75.92 m
2023	World Championships	Budapest, Hungary	20th (q)	Hammer throw	72.80 m
2023	Pan American Games	Santiago, Chile	5th	Hammer throw	74.35 m
2024	Ibero-American Championships	Cuiabá, Brazil	1st	Hammer throw	75.08 m
2024	Olympic Games	Paris, France	24th (q)	Hammer throw	71.83 m
2025	South American Championships	Mar del Plata, Argentina	3rd	Hammer throw	76.61 m
2025	World Championships	Tokyo, Japan	23rd (q)	Hammer throw	73.34 m
2026	Ibero-American Championships	Lima, Peru	1st	Hammer throw	74.70 m
2026	Pan American Championships	Medellín, Colombia	1st	Hammer throw	75.38 m
2026	South American Games	Santa Fe, Argentina	1st	Hammer throw	75.27 m
