= Kibwé Johnson =

American Olympic hammer thrower (born 1981)

Personal information
- Born: July 17, 1981 (age 44)
- Height: 1.88 m (6 ft 2 in)
- Weight: 107 kg (236 lb)

Sport
- Country: United States
- Sport: Athletics
- Event: Hammer throw
Medal record
Pan American Games
Gold medal – first place	2011 Guadalajara	Hammer throw
Gold medal – first place	2015 Toronto	Hammer throw
Silver medal – second place	2007 Rio de Janeiro	Hammer throw
- Updated on July 22, 2015

Kibwé Johnson (born July 17, 1981) is an American Olympic track and field athlete who specializes in the hammer throw. He has represented his country at the World Championships in Athletics three times (2007, 2011, and 2015). Competed in the 2012 London Olympics where he made the final and finished 9th. No American had made the final since 1996. Johnson competed in 2016 Rio de Janeiro Olympics.

He is a three-time medalist at the Pan American Games, having taken silver in 2007 and improved to the gold in 2011 (where he broke the Games record), and then repeated in 2015 in Toronto. He set his personal best of 80.31 meters (263 feet 6 inches) in 2011. He was the 2011 USA Outdoor Champion in the hammer throw and the 2008 USA Indoor Champion in the weight throw where he recorded the second best mark in US history.

== Career ==
Born in San Francisco, he initially started as a discus thrower, before starting to focus more on the hammer while studying at the University of Georgia. Johnson later moved to Moorpark Junior College in Moorpark, California before finishing at Ashland University where he later graduated and represented them in NCAA Division II competitions. He competed at the 2004 United States Olympic Trials in both the discus and hammer, placing eighth and 19th respectively. He placed third in the weight throw at the 2005 USA Indoor Track and Field Championships and threw a best of 24.54 meters (80 feet 6 inches) at the Oiler Open meet – a distance which ranked him as the third best American and eleventh best ever in the history of the event. A personal record hammer throw of 78.25 m in May saw him rank third nationally that year. He was the runner-up in the weight throw at the 2006 USA Indoors, then finished in fourth place in the hammer throw at the USA Outdoor Track and Field Championships later that year.

Johnson had his breakthrough season in 2007. He won the discus event at the Mt. SAC Relays then came runner-up in the hammer at the 2007 USA Outdoors. Making his international debut at the 2007 Pan American Games, he had a throw of 73.23 m on his final attempt, which brought him the silver medal behind Canada's James Steacy. Johnson was selected to represent the United States at the 2007 World Championships in Athletics, but failed to record a valid throw in the qualifying round. In spite of this he remained positive about the experience and fellow throwers Tore Gustafsson and Koji Murofushi offered him encouragement and technical advice. In 2008 he won the USA Indoors weight throw title – his first win at national level – but he fouled out at the 2008 Olympic Trials later in the season. This frustrating result was the catalyst for his move to train with Dr. Bondarchuk.

After missing much of 2009, he returned to form in 2010 as he finished as runner-up in the hammer at the 2010 USA Outdoor Track and Field Championships (throwing 76.31 m). A personal best throw of 80.31 m at the 2011 USA Outdoors saw Johnson take his first ever national outdoor title. As national champion, he gained his second opportunity to compete on the global stage at the 2011 World Championships in Athletics, but his best throw of 75.06 m in qualifying was not enough to reach the final. He was also chosen to represent his country at the 2011 Pan American Games in Guadalajara. At the competition he improved from his silver in 2007 to take the gold medal with a Pan American Games record mark of 79.63 m, improving Lance Deal's record from 1999.

In the last ten years, Kibwé has won 5 US Championships with 3 runner-up finishes. He competed at the 2012 Summer Olympics, finishing 8th in the men's hammer final. One of the most versatile throwers of all time, he has the unofficial world record for combination of Hammer throw (80.31 m; 263 ft 6 in), Discus (65.11 m; 213 ft 7 in), indoor weight throw (25.12 m; 82 ft 5 in).

Year	Competition	Venue	Position	Event	Notes
2016	USA Olympic Trials Track and Field	Eugene, Oregon	2nd	Hammer throw	75.11 m (246 ft 5 in)
2016	USA Indoor Track and Field Championships	Portland, Oregon	15th	Weight throw	0.00 m (0 in) NM
2015	USA Outdoor Track and Field Championships	Eugene, Oregon	1st	Hammer throw	76.95 m (252 ft 5 1/2 in)
2015	USA Indoor Track and Field Championships	Reggie Lewis Center, Boston, MA	5th	Weight throw	22.54 m (73 ft 11 1/4 in)
2014	USA Outdoor Track and Field Championships	Hornet Stadium (Sacramento)	1st	Hammer throw	74.16 m (243 ft 3 1/2 in)
2013	USA Outdoor Track and Field Championships	Drake Stadium Des Moines, Iowa	5th	Hammer throw	71.17 m (233 ft 5 3/4 in)
2012	USA Olympic Trials Track and Field	Eugene, Oregon	1st	Hammer throw	74.97 m (245 ft 11 1/2 in)
2011	USA Outdoor Track and Field Championships	Eugene, Oregon	1st	Hammer throw	80.31 m (263 ft 5 3/4 in)
2010	USA Outdoor Track and Field Championships	Drake Stadium Des Moines, Iowa	2nd	Hammer throw	76.31 m (250 ft 4 1/4 in)
2010	DécaNation	Annecy, France	1st	Hammer throw	75.12 m (246 ft 5 1/4 in)
2009	USA Outdoor Track and Field Championships	Eugene, Oregon	32nd	Hammer throw	0.00 m (0 in) NM
2009	USA Indoor Track and Field Championships	Reggie Lewis Center, Boston, MA	9th	Weight throw	18.92 m (62 ft 3/4 in)
2008	USA Olympic Trials Track and Field	Eugene, Oregon	12th	Hammer throw	0.00 m (0 in) NM
2008	USA Indoor Track and Field Championships	Reggie Lewis Center, Boston, MA	1st	Weight throw	25.12 m (82 ft 4 3/4 in)
2007	USA Outdoor Track and Field Championships	Eugene, Oregon	2nd	Hammer throw	75.12 m (246 ft 5 1/4 in)
2006	USA Outdoor Track and Field Championships	IUPUI, Carroll Stadium	4th	Hammer throw	71.87 m (235 ft 9 1/2 in)
2006	USA Indoor Track and Field Championships	Reggie Lewis Center, Boston, MA	2nd	Weight throw	23.72 m (77 ft 9 3/4 in)
2005	USA Outdoor Track and Field Championships	California State University, Dominguez Hills	13th	Hammer throw	54.40 m (178 ft 5 1/2 in)
2005	USA Indoor Track and Field Championships	Reggie Lewis Center, Boston, MA	3rd	Weight throw	22.27 m (73 ft 3/4 in)
2004	USA Olympic Trials Track and Field	California State University, Sacramento Alex G. Spanos Sports and Recreation Complex	19th	Hammer throw	65.39 m (214 ft 6 1/4 in)
2003	USA Outdoor Track and Field Championships	Stanford University Cobb Track & Angel Field	16th	Hammer throw	62.35 m (204 ft 6 1/2 in)

== Personal life ==
He is coached by former Soviet Olympic champion and coach, Dr. Anatoliy Bondarchuk. He is married to Crystal Smith Johnson, a former Canadian champion and record holder who also trained with Bondarchuk. They have two daughters, born on April 18, 2012, and September 6, 2015. Johnson resides in Bradenton, Florida, where he is a throws coach at IMG Academy.
