= Gabriel Kehr =

Chilean hammer thrower (born 1996)

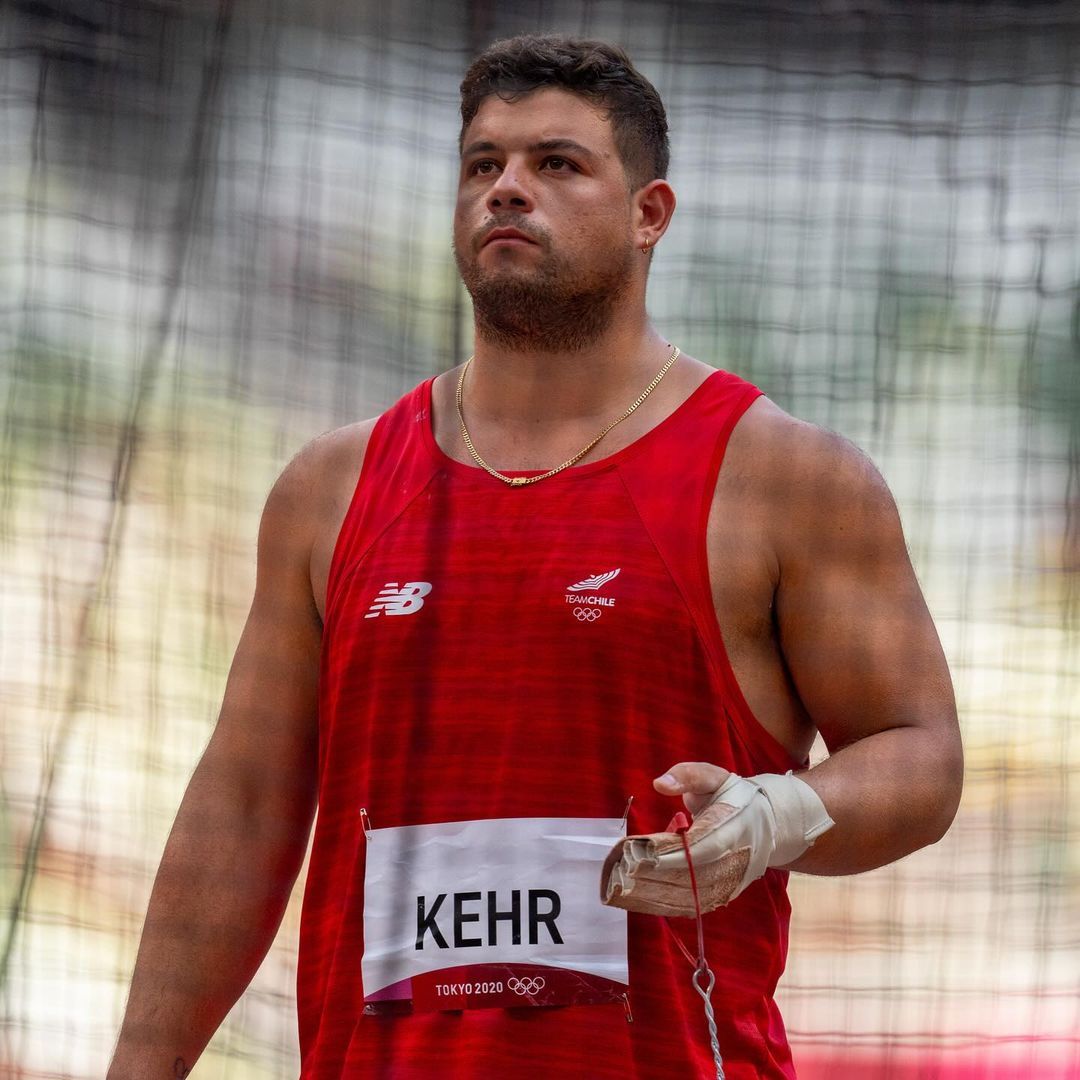
- Kehr at the 2020 Olympics

Personal information
- Full name: Gabriel Kehr Sabra
- Born: 3 September 1996 (age 30) Temuco, Chile

Sport
- Sport: Athletics
- Event: Hammer throw
Medal record
Representing Chile
Pan American Games
Gold medal – first place	2019 Lima	Hammer throw
South American Games
Gold medal – first place	2022 Asunción	Hammer throw
Silver medal – second place	2026 Santa Fe	Hammer throw

Gabriel Enrique Kehr Sabra (born 3 September 1996) is a Chilean athlete specialising in the hammer throw. He won the gold medal at the 2019 South American Championships with a new championships record of 75.27 metres.

His personal best in the event is 76.42 metres set in Temuco in 2019, mark he improved to 77.54 m on 29 April 2021, in the same place.

He represented Chile at the 2020 Summer Olympics.

== International competitions ==
Year	Competition	Venue	Position	Event	Notes
Representing Chile
2012	South American Youth Championships	Mendoza, Argentina	3rd	Hammer throw (5 kg)	66.49 m
2013	World Youth Championships	Donetsk, Ukraine	12th (q)	Hammer throw (5 kg)	71.68 m^{1}
2014	World Junior Championships	Eugene, United States	21st (q)	Hammer throw (6 kg)	69.84 m
2014	South American U23 Championships	Montevideo, Uruguay	3rd	Hammer throw	63.38 m
2015	South American Junior Championships	Cuenca, Ecuador	3rd	Hammer throw (6 kg)	77.54 m
2015	Pan American Junior Championships	Edmonton, Canada	2nd	Hammer throw (6 kg)	74.42 m
2016	Ibero-American Championships	Rio de Janeiro, Brazil	6th	Hammer throw	66.90 m
2016	South American U23 Championships	Lima, Peru	3rd	Hammer throw	69.80 m
2018	South American Games	Cochabamba, Bolivia	4th	Hammer throw	72.06 m
2018	Ibero-American Championships	Trujillo, Peru	5th	Hammer throw	71.54 m
2018	South American U23 Championships	Cuenca, Ecuador	3rd	Hammer throw	74.31 m
2019	South American Championships	Lima, Peru	1st	Hammer throw	75.27 m
2019	Pan American Games	Lima, Peru	1st	Hammer throw	74.98 m
2019	World Championships	Doha, Qatar	17th (q)	Hammer throw	73.99 m
2021	South American Championships	Guayaquil, Ecuador	2nd	Hammer throw	75.18 m
2021	Olympic Games	Tokyo, Japan	13th (q)	Hammer throw	75.60 m
2022	Ibero-American Championships	La Nucía, Spain	2nd	Hammer throw	74.61 m
2022	South American Games	Asunción, Paraguay	1st	Hammer throw	76.81 m
2023	South American Championships	São Paulo, Brazil	2nd	Hammer throw	75.57 m
2023	World Championships	Budapest, Hungary	9th	Hammer throw	75.99 m
2023	Pan American Games	Santiago, Chile	6th	Hammer throw	74.32 m
2024	Ibero-American Championships	Cuiabá, Brazil	4th	Hammer throw	72.48 m
2024	Olympic Games	Paris, France	20th (q)	Hammer throw	72.31 m
2025	South American Championships	Mar del Plata, Argentina	2nd	Hammer throw	76.90 m
2025	World Championships	Tokyo, Japan	22nd (q)	Hammer throw	73.59 m
2026	Ibero-American Championships	Lima, Peru	3rd	Hammer throw	74.03 m
2026	Pan American Championships	Medellín, Colombia	3rd	Hammer throw	74.28 m
2026	South American Games	Santa Fe, Argentina	2nd	Hammer throw	75.05 m

^{1}No mark in the final
