= 2010 NACAC Under-23 Championships in Athletics – Results =

These are the results of the 2010 NACAC Under-23 Championships in Athletics which took place from 9 to 11 July 2010 in Miramar, Florida, United States.

== Men's results ==
=== 100 meters ===
Heats Wind: Heat 1: -1.3 m/s, Heat 2: -0.8 m/s, Heat 3: +0.4 m/s

Rank	Heat	Name	Nationality	Time	Notes
1	3	Samuel Effah	Canada	10.35	Q
2	3	Luther Ambrose	United States	10.36	Q
3	2	Maurice Mitchell	United States	10.45	Q
4	1	Jacques Harvey	Jamaica	10.46	Q
5	2	Oshane Bailey	Jamaica	10.47	Q
6	3	Joel Dillon	Trinidad and Tobago	10.51	q
7	2	Brijesh Lawrence	Saint Kitts and Nevis	10.54	q
8	3	Antoine Adams	Saint Kitts and Nevis	10.57	
9	1	Keston Bledman	Trinidad and Tobago	10.61	Q
10	1	Tyrone Halstead	Canada	10.73	
11	3	Jamal Forbes	Bahamas	10.79	
12	2	Enmanuel Brioso	Dominican Republic	10.79	
13	1	Geovanny Felix	Dominican Republic	10.83	
14	2	Harold Houston	Bermuda	10.88	
15	2	Rico Tull	Barbados	10.93	
16	1	Jonathan Davis	Bahamas	10.98	
17	1	Roshano Cox	Turks and Caicos Islands	11.04	
18	3	Kieron Rogers	Anguilla	11.28	
19	1	Juan José Reyes	Mexico	11.32	
20	3	Richard Ibeh	Cayman Islands	11.40	
21	2	Arthur Lawrence	Saint Vincent and the Grenadines	11.41	
	3	George Bretous	Haiti	DNS	

Final Wind: +1.7 m/s

Rank	Name	Nationality	Time	Notes
1st place, gold medalist(s)	Samuel Effah	Canada	10.06	PB, CR
2nd place, silver medalist(s)	Oshane Bailey	Jamaica	10.11	PB
3rd place, bronze medalist(s)	Maurice Mitchell	United States	10.14	
4	Keston Bledman	Trinidad and Tobago	10.19	
5	Jacques Harvey	Jamaica	10.26	
6	Joel Dillon	Trinidad and Tobago	10.36	
7	Luther Ambrose	United States	10.40	
8	Brijesh Lawrence	Saint Kitts and Nevis	10.45	

=== 200 meters ===
Heats Wind: Heat 1: +2.0 m/s, Heat 2: +1.2 m/s, Heat 3: +2.8 m/s

Rank	Heat	Name	Nationality	Time	Notes
1	1	Curtis Mitchell	United States	19.99	Q, CR
2	2	Brandon Byram	United States	20.31	Q
3	2	Rasheed Dwyer	Jamaica	20.64	Q
4	1	Antoine Adams	Saint Kitts and Nevis	20.80	Q
5	2	Tyler Harper	Canada	20.91	PB, q
6	2	La'Sean Pickstock	Bahamas	21.03	PB, q
7	1	Harold Houston	Bermuda	21.04	
8	3	Terence Agard	Netherlands Antilles	21.06 w	Q
9	3	Ramone McKenzie	Jamaica	21.08 w	Q
10	3	Brijesh Lawrence	Saint Kitts and Nevis	21.10 w	
11	2	Rico Tull	Barbados	21.25	PB
12	1	Jonathan Davis	Bahamas	21.37	
13	1	Liemarvin Bonevacia	Netherlands Antilles	21.62	
14	1	Salvador Gómez	Mexico	22.10	
15	3	Juan José Reyes	Mexico	22.51 w	
16	3	Arthur Lawrence	Saint Vincent and the Grenadines	22.61 w	
	1	Tyrell Cuffy	Cayman Islands	DNF	
	2	George Bretous	Haiti	DNS	
	3	Samuel Effah	Canada	DNS	
	3	Gustavo Cuesta	Dominican Republic	DNS	

Final Wind: +2.8 m/s

Rank	Name	Nationality	Time	Notes
1st place, gold medalist(s)	Curtis Mitchell	United States	20.06 w	
2nd place, silver medalist(s)	Brandon Byram	United States	20.46 w	
3rd place, bronze medalist(s)	Rasheed Dwyer	Jamaica	20.64 w	
4	Ramone McKenzie	Jamaica	20.94 w	
5	Antoine Adams	Saint Kitts and Nevis	21.00 w	
6	Terence Agard	Netherlands Antilles	21.02 w	
7	Tyler Harper	Canada	21.03 w	
8	La'Sean Pickstock	Bahamas	21.07 w	

=== 400 meters ===
Heats

Rank	Heat	Name	Nationality	Time	Notes
1	1	Joey Hughes	United States	45.93	Q
2	2	Tavaris Tate	United States	45.98	Q
3	1	Zwade Hewitt	Trinidad and Tobago	46.23	Q
4	1	LaToy Williams	Bahamas	46.55	q
5	2	Demetrius Pinder	Bahamas	46.70	Q
6	1	Tyler Harper	Canada	46.71	q
7	2	Gustavo Cuesta	Dominican Republic	46.81	q
8	2	Teo Bennett	Jamaica	46.99	q
9	2	Jonathan Reid	Canada	47.05	
10	1	Terence Agard	Netherlands Antilles	47.37	
11	2	Ade Alleyne-Forte	Trinidad and Tobago	48.11	
12	2	Liemarvin Bonevacia	Netherlands Antilles	48.21	
13	1	Joel Mejia	Dominican Republic	48.33	
14	2	Alan Acosta	Mexico	48.85	
15	1	Salvador Gómez	Mexico	49.82	

Final

Rank	Name	Nationality	Time	Notes
1st place, gold medalist(s)	Tavaris Tate	United States	45.36	
2nd place, silver medalist(s)	Joey Hughes	United States	45.79	
3rd place, bronze medalist(s)	Demetrius Pinder	Bahamas	45.90	
4	Zwade Hewitt	Trinidad and Tobago	46.13	
5	Tyler Harper	Canada	46.24	
6	LaToy Williams	Bahamas	46.67	
7	Teo Bennett	Jamaica	46.69	PB
8	Gustavo Cuesta	Dominican Republic	47.93	

=== 800 meters ===
Heats

Rank	Heat	Name	Nationality	Time	Notes
1	1	Cory Primm	United States	1:50.12	Q
2	2	Charles Jock	United States	1:50.52	Q
3	1	Tayron Reyes	Dominican Republic	1:50.58	Q
4	2	James Eichberger	Mexico	1:50.62	Q
5	2	Aaron Evans	Bermuda	1:50.63	Q
6	1	Jaamal James	Trinidad and Tobago	1:50.66	Q
7	2	Garvin Nero	Trinidad and Tobago	1:50.68	q
8	1	Edgar Cortez	Nicaragua	1:51.01	q
9	1	Jairo Troeman	Netherlands Antilles	1:52.72	
10	2	Arnold Monge	Costa Rica	1:55.63	
11	2	LaQuardo Newbold	Bahamas	1:57.72	
	1	José Juan Esparza	Mexico	DNS	

Final

Rank	Name	Nationality	Time	Notes
1st place, gold medalist(s)	Charles Jock	United States	1:45:65	CR
2nd place, silver medalist(s)	Aaron Evans	Bermuda	1:47:79	
3rd place, bronze medalist(s)	Garvin Nero	Trinidad and Tobago	1:48:16	
4	James Eichberger	Mexico	1:48:34	
5	Cory Primm	United States	1:49:04	
6	Jaamal James	Trinidad and Tobago	1:49:79	
7	Tayron Reyes	Dominican Republic	1:51:12	
	Edgar Cortez	Nicaragua	DNF	

=== 1500 meters ===
Final

Rank	Name	Nationality	Time	Notes
1st place, gold medalist(s)	Olivier Collin	Canada	3:44:45	CR
2nd place, silver medalist(s)	Benja Blankenship	United States	3:45:43	
3rd place, bronze medalist(s)	Anthony Berkis	Canada	3:46:36	
4	Cory Nanni	United States	3:47:95	
5	José Juan Esparza	Mexico	3:50:65	
6	Diego Alberto Borrego	Mexico	3:54:53	
7	Álvaro Abreu	Dominican Republic	3:55:16	
8	George Smith	Trinidad and Tobago	4:06:97	
	Jairo Troeman	Netherlands Antilles	DNS	
	Garvin Nero	Trinidad and Tobago	SCR	

=== 5000 meters ===
Final

Rank	Name	Nationality	Time	Notes
1st place, gold medalist(s)	Diego Alberto Borrego	Mexico	14:32:90	CR
2nd place, silver medalist(s)	Mike Crouch	United States	14:33:33	
3rd place, bronze medalist(s)	Mohamed Ige	United States	14:38:95	
4	José Guadalupe Mireles	Mexico	14:39:75	
5	Adrián Rodríguez	Puerto Rico	15:04:05	
6	Pedro Carella	Dominican Republic	15:38:72	
	Jeremías Saloj	Guatemala	SCR	

=== 10,000 meters ===
Final

Rank	Name	Nationality	Time	Notes
1st place, gold medalist(s)	Ahmed Osman	United States	30:38:22	
2nd place, silver medalist(s)	Colin Mickow	United States	30:42:16	
3rd place, bronze medalist(s)	José Guadalupe Mireles	Mexico	32:38:44	
4	Alejandro Calderón Zúñiga	Costa Rica	33:48:14	
5	Kenneth Calvo	Costa Rica	35:15:49	
	Saby Luna	Mexico	SCR	
	Ismael Mondragón	Mexico	SCR	
	Jeremías Saloj	Guatemala	SCR	

=== 3000 meters steeplechase ===
Final

Rank	Name	Nationality	Time	Notes
1st place, gold medalist(s)	Donald Cabral	United States	8:52:67	
2nd place, silver medalist(s)	Álvaro Abreu	Dominican Republic	9:27:18	
3rd place, bronze medalist(s)	Stephen Finley	United States	9:57:49	
	José Rafael Bañales	Mexico	SCR	

=== 110 meters hurdles ===
Final Wind: +3.1 m/s

Rank	Name	Nationality	Time	Notes
1st place, gold medalist(s)	Ronnie Ash	United States	12.98 w	
2nd place, silver medalist(s)	Ryan Brathwaite	Barbados	13.10 w	
3rd place, bronze medalist(s)	Johnny Dutch	United States	13.30 w	
4	Shane Brathwaite	Barbados	13.80 w	
5	Emmanuel Mayers	Trinidad and Tobago	14.21 w	
6	Dennis Bain	Bahamas	14.38 w	
	Hansle Parchment	Jamaica	SCR	

=== 400 meters hurdles ===
Heats

Rank	Heat	Name	Nationality	Time	Notes
1	1	Jeshua Anderson	United States	48.85	Q
2	2	Reginald Wyatt	United States	50.18	Q
3	2	Roxroy Cato	Jamaica	50.27	Q
4	1	Winder Cuevas	Dominican Republic	50.94	Q
5	2	Nathan Arnett	Bahamas	51.01	Q
6	2	Emmanuel Mayers	Trinidad and Tobago	51.18	q
7	1	Sabiel Anderson	Jamaica	51.44	Q
8	2	Jeffery Gibson	Bahamas	51.80	q
9	1	Junior Hinds	Cayman Islands	52.45	PB
10	1	Alejandro Parada	Mexico	53.60	
11	2	Maxwell Hyman	Cayman Islands	1:00.96	
	2	Stefan Goodridge	Barbados	DNF	
	1	Kervin Morgan	Trinidad and Tobago	DNS	

Final

Rank	Name	Nationality	Time	Notes
1st place, gold medalist(s)	Jeshua Anderson	United States	49.33	
2nd place, silver medalist(s)	Winder Cuevas	Dominican Republic	50.13	
3rd place, bronze medalist(s)	Reginald Wyatt	United States	50.15	
4	Nathan Arnett	Bahamas	51.16	
5	Emmanuel Mayers	Trinidad and Tobago	51.77	
6	Sabiel Anderson	Jamaica	52.35	
7	Jeffery Gibson	Bahamas	52.43	
8	Roxroy Cato	Jamaica	53.73	

=== High jump ===
Final

Rank	Name	Nationality	1.90	1.95	2.00	2.05	2.10	2.13	2.16	2.19	2.21	2.23	2.25	Result	Notes
1st place, gold medalist(s)	Paul Hamilton	United States	-	-	-	O	O	O	XO	XO	XO	XO	XXX	2.23m	=PB
2nd place, silver medalist(s)	Ricky Robertson	United States	-	-	-	-	O	O	O	XO	XXO	XO	XXX	2.23m	
3rd place, bronze medalist(s)	Jamal Wilson	Bahamas	-	-	-	-	O	XXO	XXX					2.13m	
4	Thorrold Murray	Barbados	-	-	-	O	O	XXX						2.10m	
5	Keron Stout	British Virgin Islands	O	O	XXX									1.95m	
6	DaCosta Walbrook	Antigua and Barbuda	-	XO	XXX									1.95m	
7	Hugo César Ramírez	Mexico	O	XXX										1.90m	
8	Yoann Romney	Anguilla	XO	XXX										1.90m	
	Andrew Bachelor	Jamaica	-	-	-	XXX								NH	
	Akeame Mussington	Anguilla	XXX											NH	

=== Pole vault ===
Final

Rank	Name	Nationality	4.30	4.40	4.50	4.60	4.70	4.80	4.90	5.00	5.05	5.10	5.25	5.40	5.56	5.77	Result	Notes
1st place, gold medalist(s)	Jordan Scott	United States	-	-	-	-	-	-	-	-	O	-	O	XO	XXO	XXX	5.56m	CR
2nd place, silver medalist(s)	Deryk Theodore	Canada	-	-	-	-	-	O	-	O	-	XXO	XXX				5.10m	
3rd place, bronze medalist(s)	Ryan Vu	Canada	-	-	-	-	-	O	-	O	-	XXX					5.00m	
4	K'Don Samuels	Jamaica	O	-	-	-	O	-	O	XXX							4.90m	
5	Jorge Montes	Dominican Republic	-	-	-	O	XXX										4.60m	
6	Rick Valcin	Saint Lucia	XO	O	O	XO	XXX										4.60m	
	Yeisel Cintrón	Puerto Rico	-	-	-	-	-	XXX									NH	
	Jack Whitt	United States	-	-	-	-	-	-	-	-	XXX						NH	

=== Long jump ===
Final

Rank	Name	Nationality	#1	#2	#3	#4	#5	#6	Result	Notes
1st place, gold medalist(s)	Christian Taylor	United States	FOUL (2.0 m/s)	7.82m (+0.0 m/s)	FOUL (0.2 m/s)	7.66m (-0.7 m/s)	7.74m (-0.2 m/s)	FOUL (-0.1 m/s)	7.82m (+0.0 m/s)	
2nd place, silver medalist(s)	Chris Phipps	United States	FOUL (2.0 m/s)	7.70m (0.3 m/s)	7.74m (0.1 m/s)	7.80m (-1.0 m/s)	7.67m (-0.8 m/s)	FOUL (-0.6 m/s)	7.80m (-1.0 m/s)	
3rd place, bronze medalist(s)	Marcos Amalbert	Puerto Rico	7.22m (0.1 m/s)	7.25m (-0.5 m/s)	FOUL (-0.3 m/s)	7.20m (+0.0 m/s)	7.31m (-0.8 m/s)	7.50m (-0.4 m/s)	7.50m (-0.4 m/s)	
4	Kadeem Douglas	Canada	7.28m w (2.7 m/s)	FOUL (1.4 m/s)	FOUL (1.0 m/s)	7.36m (0.1 m/s)	7.24m (-0.7 m/s)	7.42m (-1.2 m/s)	7.42m (-1.2 m/s)	
5	Kyron Blaise	Trinidad and Tobago	7.33m (-0.2 m/s)	FOUL (0.3 m/s)	FOUL (-0.3 m/s)	7.30m (-0.4 m/s)	7.35m (-0.8 m/s)	FOUL (-1.7 m/s)	7.35m (-0.8 m/s)	
6	Miguel Hernández	Mexico	7.28m w (3.4 m/s)	7.06m (-0.9 m/s)	7.15m (0.5 m/s)	7.14m (-0.1 m/s)	7.08m (-0.7 m/s)	7.15m (-1.3 m/s)	7.28m w (3.4 m/s)	
7	Stanley Poitier	Bahamas	6.91m w (2.1 m/s)	6.71m (0.6 m/s)	6.82m (-1.8 m/s)	6.79m (-0.2 m/s)	6.71m (-1.1 m/s)	6.71m (-0.5 m/s)	6.91m w (2.1 m/s)	
8	Akeame Mussington	Anguilla	6.81m (1.4 m/s)	6.87m (1.0 m/s)	FOUL (1.0 m/s)	6.07m (0.2 m/s)	-	-	6.87m (1.0 m/s)	
	Roshano Cox	Turks and Caicos Islands	FOUL	FOUL	-				FOUL	
	Ramon Cooper	Jamaica							SCR	

=== Triple jump ===
Final

Rank	Name	Nationality	#1	#2	#3	#4	#5	#6	Result	Notes
1st place, gold medalist(s)	Christian Taylor	United States	16.16m w (2.6 m/s)	16.36m w (2.2 m/s)	FOUL w (2.6 m/s)	16.33m (1.6 m/s)	16.66m (1.2 m/s)	16.46m (1.5 m/s)	16.66m (1.2 m/s)	
2nd place, silver medalist(s)	Joshua Como	United States	15.62m w (2.1 m/s)	FOUL (2.0 m/s)	15.74m w (2.3 m/s)	15.78m (1.8 m/s)	15.95m (0.8 m/s)	15.50m (1.4 m/s)	15.95m (0.8 m/s)	
3rd place, bronze medalist(s)	J'Vente Deveaux	Bahamas	15.06m (1.4 m/s)	FOUL (2.0 m/s)	14.98m w (2.2 m/s)	FOUL (1.4 m/s)	15.55m (1.4 m/s)	15.49m (1.0 m/s)	15.55m (1.4 m/s)	
4	Antillio Bastian	Bahamas	FOUL w (2.1 m/s)	FOUL (1.2 m/s)	FOUL (2.0 m/s)	-	FOUL w (3.1 m/s)	14.92m (1.1 m/s)	14.92m (1.1 m/s)	
	Kyron Blaise	Trinidad and Tobago	FOUL (1.7 m/s)	-	-	-	-	-	FOUL	
	David Badilla	Mexico							SCR	

=== Shot put ===
Final

Rank	Name	Nationality	#1	#2	#3	#4	#5	#6	Result	Notes
1st place, gold medalist(s)	Kurt Roberts	United States	14.72m	17.29m	17.56m	17.67m	18.60m	FOUL	18.60m	
2nd place, silver medalist(s)	Aaron Studt	United States	17.65m	17.56m	18.21m	FOUL	18.00m	FOUL	18.21m	
3rd place, bronze medalist(s)	Odane Richards	Jamaica	16.43m	FOUL	17.85m	17.48m	FOUL	18.03m	18.03m	
4	Andrew Smith	Canada	17.75m	17.04m	16.91m	FOUL	FOUL	FOUL	17.75m	
5	Mario Cota	Mexico	17.38m	FOUL	17.39m	17.06m	17.61m	17.28m	17.61m	
6	Tim Hendry-Gallagher	Canada	FOUL	16.05m	FOUL	16.15m	FOUL	17.10m	17.10m	
7	Raymond Brown	Jamaica	16.24m	15.72m	FOUL	FOUL	FOUL	16.17m	16.24m	
8	Carlos Martínez Pérez	Puerto Rico	15.61m	FOUL	16.03m	FOUL	FOUL	FOUL	16.03m	

=== Discus throw ===
Final

Rank	Name	Nationality	#1	#2	#3	#4	#5	#6	Result	Notes
1st place, gold medalist(s)	Mason Finley	United States	58.55m	FOUL	56.04m	55.17m	58.10m	59.59m	59.59m	CR
2nd place, silver medalist(s)	Mario Cota	Mexico	54.92m	56.74m	FOUL	53.44m	58.01m	55.19m	58.01m	NR
3rd place, bronze medalist(s)	Nick Jones	United States	51.91m	56.84m	FOUL	FOUL	57.03m	54.54m	57.03m	
4	Odane Richards	Jamaica	53.95m	50.16m	52.38m	54.53m	55.00m	FOUL	55.00m	
5	Raymond Brown	Jamaica	FOUL	41.56m	FOUL	FOUL	-	-	41.56m	

=== Hammer throw ===
Final

Rank	Name	Nationality	#1	#2	#3	#4	#5	#6	Result	Notes
1st place, gold medalist(s)	Chris Cralle	United States	68.84m	69.61m	70.42m	68.39m	69.13m	70.71m	70.71m	CR
2nd place, silver medalist(s)	Walter Henning	United States	69.04m	FOUL	66.05m	FOUL	69.33m	FOUL	69.33m	
3rd place, bronze medalist(s)	Nolan Henderson	Canada	64.08m	65.98m	66.16m	65.81m	66.28m	66.22m	66.28m	
4	Jean Rosario	Puerto Rico	58.54m	FOUL	60.39m	61.90m	FOUL	61.41m	61.90m	
5	Ricardo Castilleja	Mexico	59.90m	FOUL	FOUL	59.52m	58.10m	FOUL	59.90m	
	Wilfredo DeJesus Elias	Puerto Rico							SCR	

=== Javelin throw ===
Final

Rank	Name	Nationality	#1	#2	#3	#4	#5	#6	Result	Notes
1st place, gold medalist(s)	Juan José Mendez	Mexico	69.94m	FOUL	62.82m	64.60m	67.26m	67.95m	69.94m	
2nd place, silver medalist(s)	Cooper Thompson	United States	63.14m	65.04m	FOUL	69.52m	FOUL	66.08m	69.52m	
3rd place, bronze medalist(s)	Brian Moore	United States	62.84m	FOUL	FOUL	FOUL	68.41m	63.96m	68.41m	
4	Kyle Nielsen	Canada	67.55m	64.40m	FOUL	FOUL	66.48m	FOUL	67.55m	
5	Felipe Ortiz	Puerto Rico	FOUL	61.45m	61.86m	63.61m	FOUL	66.95m	66.95m	
6	Emmanuel Stewart	Trinidad and Tobago	56.19m	63.50m	62.71m	58.58m	FOUL	60.14m	63.50m	
7	Casey Garbaty	Canada	60.42m	57.98m	FOUL	57.64m	FOUL	58.84m	60.42m	
8	Omar Jones	British Virgin Islands	57.75m	55.33m	53.24m	56.44m	59.07m	58.17m	59.07m	
9	Oraine Brown	Antigua and Barbuda	53.74m	50.22m	FOUL				53.74m	
	Josué Menéndez	Mexico							SCR	
	Albert Reynolds	Saint Lucia							SCR	

=== Decathlon ===
Final

The highest mark recorded in each event is highlighted in yellow

Rank	Name	Nationality	100m	LJ	SP	HJ	400m	110m H	DT	PV	JT	1500m	Points	Notes
1st place, gold medalist(s)	Gray Horn	United States	11.19 (-1.4); 819	7.17m (0.5); 854	12.87m 659	1.97m 776	51.13 763	14.57 (-0.6); 902	38.29m 630	4.60m 790	52.27m 622	4:37.73 695	7510	CR
2nd place, silver medalist(s)	Nicholas Trubachik	United States	11.40 (-1.4); 774	6.56m (1.7); 711	13.65m 707	2.03m 831	50.62 786	15.26 (-0.6); 818	39.75m 659	4.50m 760	60.40m 744	4:35.84 707	7497	
3rd place, bronze medalist(s)	Reid Gustavson	Canada	11.45 (-1.4); 763	6.86m (1.6); 781	11.65m 585	1.85m 670	49.55 835	16.16 (-0.6); 715	33.56m 535	4.20m 673	48.78m 571	4:31.04 738	6866	
4	Josué Raya	Mexico	11.80 (-1.4); 691	6.52m (0.1); 702	11.66m 586	1.88m 696	51.72 737	16.52 (-0.6); 675	33.85m 541	3.60m 509	36.90m 397	4:34.21 717	6251	
	Jorge Eduardo Rivera	Mexico											DNS	
	Nick Adcock	United States											SCR	

=== 20,000 meters walk ===
Final

Rank	Name	Nationality	Time	Notes
1st place, gold medalist(s)	Isaac Palma	Mexico	1:28:53:38	PB, CR
2nd place, silver medalist(s)	Jorge Humberto Zárate	Mexico	1:39:39:43	
3rd place, bronze medalist(s)	Dan Serianni	United States	1:41:29:23	
4	Jose Moncada	United States	1:45:14:51	
5	José Ledezma	Costa Rica	1:48:09:37	

=== 4 x 100 meters relay ===
Final

Rank	Nation	Competitors	Time	Notes
1st place, gold medalist(s)	United States	Fred Rose; Brandon Byram; Maurice Mitchell; Curtis Mitchell	38.96	
2nd place, silver medalist(s)	Jamaica	Oshane Bailey; Ramone McKenzie; Jacques Harvey; Rasheed Dwyer	39.36	
	Dominican Republic	Enmanuel Brioso; Winder Cuevas; Geovanny Felix; Joel Mejia	DNF	
	Bahamas	Cordero Bonamy; Jamal Forbes; Dennis Bain; Jonathan Davis	DNF	
	Cayman Islands	Richard Ibeh; Steven Reid; Maxwell Hyman; Junior Hinds	DNS	
	Trinidad and Tobago		SCR	
	Canada		SCR	
	Puerto Rico	Ángel Flores	SCR	

=== 4 x 400 meters relay ===
Final

Rank	Nation	Competitors	Time	Notes
1st place, gold medalist(s)	United States	LeJerald Betters; O'Neal Wilder; Joey Hughes; Tavaris Tate	2:58.83	CR
2nd place, silver medalist(s)	Bahamas	LaToy Williams; Demetrius Pinder; Jamal Butler; La'Sean Pickstock	3:02.91	
3rd place, bronze medalist(s)	Trinidad and Tobago	Ade Alleyne-Forte; Zwade Hewitt; Garvin Nero; Emmanuel Mayers	3:07.95	
4	Jamaica	Roxroy Cato; Teo Bennett; Jason Livermore; Ramone McKenzie	3:10.71	
5	Canada	Reid Gustavson; Olivier Collin; Anthony Berkis; Jonathan Reid	3:14.58	
6	Netherlands Antilles	Terence Agard; Liemarvin Bonevacia; Javier Agard; Jairo Troeman	3:15.66	NR
	Dominican Republic	Gustavo Cuesta; Winder Cuevas; Joel Mejia; Enmanuel Brioso	DNS	
	Mexico		DNS	

== Women's results ==
=== 100 meters ===
Heats Wind: Heat 1: -1.3 m/s, Heat 2: -1.1 m/s

Rank	Heat	Name	Nationality	Time	Notes
1	2	Jeneba Tarmoh	United States	11.51	Q
2	1	Samantha Henry	Jamaica	11.63	Q
3	2	Semoy Hackett	Trinidad and Tobago	11.65	Q
4	1	Kenyanna Wilson	United States	11.75	Q
5	2	Tricia Hawthorne	Jamaica	11.77	Q
6	1	Miana Griffiths	Canada	11.83	Q
7	2	Tameka Williams	Saint Kitts and Nevis	11.85	q
8	1	Shakera Reece	Barbados	11.93	q
9	1	Mariely Sánchez	Dominican Republic	12.41	
10	2	Charlesha Lightbourne	Bahamas	12.45	

Final Wind: +2.2 m/s

Rank	Name	Nationality	Time	Notes
1st place, gold medalist(s)	Jeneba Tarmoh	United States	11.00 w	
2nd place, silver medalist(s)	Samantha Henry	Jamaica	11.25 w	
3rd place, bronze medalist(s)	Kenyanna Wilson	United States	11.32 w	
4	Semoy Hackett	Trinidad and Tobago	11.33 w	
5	Tricia Hawthorne	Jamaica	11.53 w	
6	Shakera Reece	Barbados	11.71 w	
7	Miana Griffiths	Canada	11.73 w	
8	Tameka Williams	Saint Kitts and Nevis	12.78 w	

=== 200 meters ===
Heats Wind: Heat 1: +2.1 m/s, Heat 2: +3.5 m/s

Rank	Heat	Name	Nationality	Time	Notes
1	2	Candyce McGrone	United States	23.01 w	Q
2	2	Amonn Nelson	Canada	23.25 w	Q
3	1	Tiffany Townsend	United States	23.31 w	Q
4	1	Kimberly Hyacinthe	Canada	23.32 w	Q
5	2	Audra Segree	Jamaica	23.85 w	Q
6	2	Margarita Manzueta	Dominican Republic	24.39 w	q
7	1	Charlesha Lightbourne	Bahamas	24.41 w	Q
8	1	Mariely Sánchez	Dominican Republic	24.89 w	q
	1	Tricia Hawthorne	Jamaica	FS	
	1	Tameka Williams	Saint Kitts and Nevis	DNS	
	2	Semoy Hackett	Trinidad and Tobago	DNS	

Final Wind: +2.1 m/s

Rank	Name	Nationality	Time	Notes
1st place, gold medalist(s)	Tiffany Townsend	United States	22.92 w	
2nd place, silver medalist(s)	Kimberly Hyacinthe	Canada	23.14 w	
3rd place, bronze medalist(s)	Candyce McGrone	United States	23.16 w	
4	Amonn Nelson	Canada	23.17 w	
5	Audra Segree	Jamaica	23.65 w	
6	Charlesha Lightbourne	Bahamas	24.73 w	
7	Margarita Manzueta	Dominican Republic	24.97 w	
8	Mariely Sánchez	Dominican Republic	25.85 w	

=== 400 meters ===
Final

Rank	Name	Nationality	Time	Notes
1st place, gold medalist(s)	Shelise Williams	United States	53.08	
2nd place, silver medalist(s)	Ebony Collins	United States	53.31	
3rd place, bronze medalist(s)	Raysa Sánchez	Dominican Republic	54.08	
4	Afiya Walker	Trinidad and Tobago	54.48	
5	Verone Chambers	Jamaica	54.54	
6	Alecia Cutenar	Jamaica	55.72	
7	Karla Dueñas	Mexico	56.22	
8	Margarita Manzueta	Dominican Republic	56.78	
	Amonn Nelson	Canada	SCR	

=== 800 meters ===
Final

Rank	Name	Nationality	Time	Notes
1st place, gold medalist(s)	Jessica Smith	Canada	2:04:96	
2nd place, silver medalist(s)	Christina Rodgers	United States	2:05:00	
3rd place, bronze medalist(s)	Anna Layman	United States	2:05:39	
4	Melissa Bishop	Canada	2:05:66	
5	Shelleyka Rolle	Bahamas	2:13:40	
6	Romona Nicholls	Bahamas	2:14:58	
	Samantha John	British Virgin Islands	SCR	

=== 1500 meters ===
Final

Rank	Name	Nationality	Time	Notes
1st place, gold medalist(s)	Keri Bland	United States	4:24:38	
2nd place, silver medalist(s)	Jessica O'Connell	Canada	4:25:78	
3rd place, bronze medalist(s)	Ashley Verplank	United States	4:28:75	
4	Julieta Bautista	Mexico	4:34:62	

=== 5000 meters ===
Final

Rank	Name	Nationality	Time	Notes
1st place, gold medalist(s)	Jessica O'Connell	Canada	17:15:73	
2nd place, silver medalist(s)	Beatriz Hernández	Mexico	17:32:75	
3rd place, bronze medalist(s)	Tara Erdmann	United States	18:27:49	
	María Reyna Mota	Mexico	SCR	
	Sara Prieto	Mexico	SCR	

=== 10,000 meters ===
Final

Rank	Name	Nationality	Time	Notes
1st place, gold medalist(s)	Sarah Porter	United States	36:15:51	CR
2nd place, silver medalist(s)	Dianna Cisneros	Mexico	36:59:66	
3rd place, bronze medalist(s)	Amanda Goetschius	United States	37:18:81	
4	Beatriz Hernández	Mexico	39:43:05	

=== 3000 meters steeplechase ===
Final

Rank	Name	Nationality	Time	Notes
1st place, gold medalist(s)	Rebeka Stowe	United States	10:08:58	CR
2nd place, silver medalist(s)	Stephanie Garcia	United States	10:20:50	
3rd place, bronze medalist(s)	Sara Prieto	Mexico	10:54:34	

=== 100 meters hurdles ===
Final Wind: +2.3 m/s

Rank	Name	Nationality	Time	Notes
1st place, gold medalist(s)	Ti'erra Brown	United States	12.86 w	
2nd place, silver medalist(s)	Michaylin Golladay	United States	13.07 w	
3rd place, bronze medalist(s)	Rosemary Carty	Jamaica	13.22 w	
4	Noelle Montcalm	Canada	13.25 w	
5	Alyssa Costas	Puerto Rico	13.99 w	
6	Carla Gabriela Rodríguez	Mexico	14.60 w	
	Janelle Gordon	Jamaica	DNS	
	Litzy Vázquez	Puerto Rico	SCR	

=== 400 meters hurdles ===
Final

Rank	Name	Nationality	Time	Notes
1st place, gold medalist(s)	Ti'erra Brown	United States	55.14	CR
2nd place, silver medalist(s)	Tameka Jameson	United States	55.97	
3rd place, bronze medalist(s)	Nikita Tracey	Jamaica	56.89	
4	Janeil Bellille	Trinidad and Tobago	56.95	
5	Sarah Wells	Canada	57.64	
6	Michelle Cumberbatch	Bahamas	59.26	
7	Kathyenid Rivera	Puerto Rico	59.30	
8	Andrea Reid	Jamaica	1:01.08	
	Karla Dueñas	Mexico	SCR	
	Carla Gabriela Rodríguez	Mexico	SCR	

=== High jump ===
Final

Rank	Name	Nationality	1.65	1.70	1.73	1.76	1.79	1.81	1.83	1.86	1.90	Result	Notes
1st place, gold medalist(s)	Amber Kaufman	United States	-	-	O	O	O	XO	XO	XO	XXX	1.86m	
2nd place, silver medalist(s)	April Sinkler	United States	-	O	O	O	O	O	XXX			1.81m	
3rd place, bronze medalist(s)	Caleigh Bacchus	Trinidad and Tobago	-	O	O	O	XXX					1.76m	
3rd place, bronze medalist(s)	Paola Fuentes	Mexico	-	O	O	O	XXX					1.76m	
5	Leronique Ponteen	Saint Kitts and Nevis	O	XXX								1.65m	

=== Pole vault ===
Final

Rank	Name	Nationality	3.60	3.80	3.90	4.00	4.10	4.20	4.30	4.40	Result	Notes
1st place, gold medalist(s)	Gabriella Duclos-Lasnier	Canada	-	-	-	-	O	XXO	XO	XXX	4.30m	
2nd place, silver medalist(s)	Melissa Gergel	United States	-	-	-	XO	O	XXX			4.10m	
3rd place, bronze medalist(s)	Rachel Laurent	United States	-	XXO	O	XXX					3.90m	
3rd place, bronze medalist(s)	Ariane Beaumont-Courteau	Canada	XO	XO	O	XXX					3.90m	

=== Long jump ===
Final

Rank	Name	Nationality	#1	#2	#3	#4	#5	#6	Result	Notes
1st place, gold medalist(s)	Shara Proctor	Anguilla	6.43m (0.9 m/s)	6.15m (-0.2 m/s)	6.21m (-0.5 m/s)	6.27m (-0.3 m/s)	FOUL (-1.2 m/s)	FOUL (0.1 m/s)	6.43m (0.9 m/s)	
2nd place, silver medalist(s)	Bianca Stuart	Bahamas	6.42m (-0.4 m/s)	FOUL (-0.7 m/s)	FOUL (0.1 m/s)	6.30m (-0.4 m/s)	4.43m (-0.6 m/s)	6.35m (0.3 m/s)	6.42m (-0.4 m/s)	
3rd place, bronze medalist(s)	April Sinkler	United States	6.08m (-0.1 m/s)	6.23m (-0.1 m/s)	6.33m (-1.5 m/s)	6.08m (-0.1 m/s)	6.22m (-0.4 m/s)	6.16m (0.2 m/s)	6.33m (-1.5 m/s)	
4	Lauryn Newson	United States	6.27m (-1.5 m/s)	6.25m (-0.1 m/s)	6.08m (-1.1 m/s)	6.22m (0.8 m/s)	6.32m (-0.8 m/s)	5.89m (0.1 m/s)	6.32m (-0.8 m/s)	
5	Sheriffa Whyte	Saint Kitts and Nevis	5.84m (-1.9 m/s)	5.41m (0.3 m/s)	5.82m (-2.1 m/s)	5.62m (+0.0 m/s)	5.59m (0.2 m/s)	5.70m (-0.6 m/s)	5.84m (-1.9 m/s)	
6	Yvonne Alejandra Treviño	Mexico	FOUL (-0.6 m/s)	5.69m (+0.0 m/s)	FOUL (-0.3 m/s)	FOUL (0.4 m/s)	5.59m (-0.5 m/s)	FOUL (-1.0 m/s)	5.69m (+0.0 m/s)	
7	Keythra Richards	Bahamas	5.46m (-0.8 m/s)	5.67m (-0.2 m/s)	5.55m (-0.3 m/s)	5.39m (0.2 m/s)	FOUL (-0.5 m/s)	5.33m (-0.3 m/s)	5.67m (-0.2 m/s)	
8	Liliana Hernández	Mexico	FOUL (-0.4 m/s)	FOUL (-0.6 m/s)	5.06m (-1.6 m/s)	4.66m (0.2 m/s)	FOUL (-1.0 m/s)	FOUL (-0.6 m/s)	5.06m (-1.6 m/s)	
	Salcia Slack	Jamaica	-	-	-				SCR	
	Kimberly Williams	Jamaica							DNS	
	Estefany Cruz	Guatemala							SCR	
	Ann-Marie Duffus	Jamaica							SCR	

=== Triple jump ===
Final

Rank	Name	Nationality	#1	#2	#3	#4	#5	#6	Result	Notes
1st place, gold medalist(s)	Kimberly Williams	Jamaica	14.14m w (3.1 m/s)	14.10m w (2.4 m/s)	14.13m w (2.5 m/s)	13.90m (2.0 m/s)	13.84m w (2.5 m/s)	13.79m (1.1 m/s)	14.14m w (3.1 m/s)	
2nd place, silver medalist(s)	Ashika Charan	United States	12.88m w (2.6 m/s)	13.35m w (2.8 m/s)	13.29m w (2.8 m/s)	13.00m w (2.6 m/s)	FOUL (1.7 m/s)	12.59m w (2.2 m/s)	13.35m w (2.8 m/s)	
3rd place, bronze medalist(s)	Melissa Ogbourne	Jamaica	FOUL w (2.6 m/s)	FOUL w (2.6 m/s)	13.14m w (2.3 m/s)	12.92m (1.6 m/s)	FOUL (1.5 m/s)	13.00m (1.9 m/s)	13.14m w (2.3 m/s)	
4	April Sinkler	United States	FOUL w (2.3 m/s)	12.64m w (2.8 m/s)	13.07m w (3.5 m/s)	13.07m w (2.6 m/s)	12.94m w (2.2 m/s)	12.98m (1.2 m/s)	13.07m w (3.5 m/s)	
5	Liliana Hernández	Mexico	12.34m (2.0 m/s)	12.50m w (2.2 m/s)	11.88m w (3.1 m/s)	11.52m (2.0 m/s)	FOUL (2.0 m/s)	11.90m w (2.1 m/s)	12.50m w (2.2 m/s)	
6	Keythra Richards	Bahamas	11.12m w (2.5 m/s)	FOUL (2.0 m/s)	FOUL (1.6 m/s)	11.55m (2.0 m/s)	FOUL w (3.3 m/s)	11.51m (1.3 m/s)	11.55m (2.0 m/s)	
	Estefany Cruz	Guatemala							SCR	

=== Shot put ===
Final

Rank	Name	Nationality	#1	#2	#3	#4	#5	#6	Result	Notes
1st place, gold medalist(s)	Karen Shump	United States	16.69m	16.33m	16.89m	16.95m	17.43m	FOUL	17.43m	PB, CR
2nd place, silver medalist(s)	Anna Jelmini	United States	15.58m	15.47m	16.45m	16.58m	FOUL	16.10m	16.58m	
3rd place, bronze medalist(s)	Julie Labonté	Canada	15.21m	15.32m	15.78m	15.89m	15.82m	15.66m	15.89m	
4	Paulina Flores	Mexico	12.51m	12.36m	FOUL	12.49m	FOUL	12.40m	12.51m	
	Melissa Alfred	Dominica							SCR	
	Althea Charles	Antigua and Barbuda							SCR	

=== Discus throw ===
Final

Rank	Name	Nationality	#1	#2	#3	#4	#5	#6	Result	Notes
1st place, gold medalist(s)	Anna Jelmini	United States	53.48m	54.91m	55.73m	56.08m	56.70m	55.10m	56.70m	CR
2nd place, silver medalist(s)	Jeneva McCall	United States	54.34m	FOUL	FOUL	54.89m	55.82m	56.16m	56.16m	
3rd place, bronze medalist(s)	Paulina Flores	Mexico	46.90m	46.89m	FOUL	44.22m	FOUL	47.49m	47.49m	
4	Julie Labonté	Canada	47.20m	FOUL	FOUL	45.36m	46.79m	43.83m	47.20m	

=== Hammer throw ===
Final

Rank	Name	Nationality	#1	#2	#3	#4	#5	#6	Result	Notes
1st place, gold medalist(s)	Heather Steacy	Canada	65.74m	67.20m	66.62m	62.27m	62.03m	FOUL	67.20m	CR
2nd place, silver medalist(s)	Jeneva McCall	United States	62.46m	64.17m	61.57m	61.06m	FOUL	61.18m	64.17m	
3rd place, bronze medalist(s)	Gwen Berry	United States	62.55m	FOUL	FOUL	FOUL	FOUL	FOUL	62.55m	
4	Annie Larose	Canada	49.80m	FOUL	FOUL	59.13m	FOUL	FOUL	59.13m	
5	Althea Charles	Antigua and Barbuda	49.97m	51.37m	48.75m	49.05m	51.64m	51.50m	51.64m	
6	Cristina Bello	Dominican Republic	FOUL	FOUL	46.73m	FOUL	45.94m	FOUL	46.73m	

=== Javelin throw ===
Final

Rank	Name	Nationality	#1	#2	#3	#4	#5	#6	Result	Notes
1st place, gold medalist(s)	Elizabeth Gleadle	Canada	53.72m	47.01m	49.77m	48.12m	50.06m	48.56m	53.72m	
2nd place, silver medalist(s)	Fresa Iris Núñez	Dominican Republic	52.03m	51.01m	46.34m	50.07m	49.07m	53.11m	53.11m	NR
3rd place, bronze medalist(s)	Marissa Tschida	United States	48.24m	47.00m	48.03m	49.36m	50.07m	49.54m	50.07m	
4	Brittany Borman	United States	47.11m	44.01m	47.01m	49.01m	47.02m	50.02m	50.02m	

=== Heptathlon ===
Final

The highest mark recorded in each event is highlighted in yellow

Rank	Name	Nationality	100m H	HJ	SP	200m	LJ	JT	800m	Points	Notes
1st place, gold medalist(s)	Kiani Profit	United States	14.21 (-1.6); 949	1.69m 842	12.11m 668	24.32 (2.3); 950	5.60m (-1.7); 729	36.62m 603	2:19.19 835	5576	
2nd place, silver medalist(s)	Dorcas Akinniyi	United States	14.46 (-1.6); 914	1.69m 842	11.71m 642	25.23 (2.3); 866	5.51m (-1.3); 703	27.45m 428	2:21.09 809	5204	
3rd place, bronze medalist(s)	Makeba Alcide	Saint Lucia	14.54 (-1.6); 903	1.66m 806	11.36m 619	25.37 (2.3); 853	4.98m (-1.1); 554	37.37m 617	2:20.24 820	5172	NR

=== 10,000 meters walk ===
Final

Rank	Name	Nationality	Time	Notes
1st place, gold medalist(s)	Erandi Magdalena Uribe	Mexico	50:12:27	
2nd place, silver medalist(s)	Lauren Forgues	United States	51:06:38	
3rd place, bronze medalist(s)	Lizbeth Silva	Mexico	52:31:78	
4	Miranda Melville	United States	53:03:30	

=== 4 x 100 meters relay ===
Final

Rank	Nation	Competitors	Time	Notes
1st place, gold medalist(s)	United States	Jeneba Tarmoh; Amber Purvis; Tiffany Townsend; Kenyanna Wilson	43.07	CR
2nd place, silver medalist(s)	Jamaica	Rosemary Carty; Samantha Henry; Audra Segree; Tricia Hawthorne	44.20	
3rd place, bronze medalist(s)	Bahamas	Charlesha Lightbourne; Yanique Clarke; Ashley Hanna; Michelle Cumberbatch	46.82	
	Canada		SCR	

=== 4 x 400 meters relay ===
Final

Rank	Nation	Competitors	Time	Notes
1st place, gold medalist(s)	United States	Ebony Collins; Amber Purvis; Shelise Williams; Tameka Jameson	3:29.80	
2nd place, silver medalist(s)	Jamaica	Verone Chambers; Nikita Tracey; Andrea Reid; Alecia Cutenar	3:38.05	
3rd place, bronze medalist(s)	Canada	Amonn Nelson; Jessica Smith; Miana Griffiths; Sarah Wells	3:40.09	
4	Dominican Republic	Stephany Jiménez; Raysa Sánchez; Mariely Sánchez; Margarita Manzueta	3:42.15	
5	Bahamas	Ashley Hanna; Michelle Cumberbatch; Yanique Clarke; Shelleyka Rolle	3:45.51	
