= Joel Mejia =

Dominican Republic sprinter

Joel Mejía
Personal information
- Full name: Joel Francisco Mejía de la Cruz
- Born: 18 August 1990 (age 35) Higüey, Dominican Republic
- Height: 1.78 m (5 ft 10 in)
- Weight: 65 kg (143 lb)

Sport
- Country: Dominican Republic
- Sport: Athletics
- Events: Sprint and Middle-distance running
- Updated on 16 December 2014

Joel Francisco Mejía de la Cruz (born 18 August 1990) is a Dominican Republic sprinter. He competed in the 4 × 400 m relay event at the 2012 Summer Olympics.

== Personal bests ==
- 400 m: 46.32 s A – Irapuato, Mexico, 7 July 2012
- 800 m: 1:49.67 min – Mayagüez, Puerto Rico, 17 July 2011

== Achievements ==
Year	Competition	Venue	Position	Event	Notes
Representing the Dominican Republic
2010	Central American and Caribbean Junior Championships (U20)	Santo Domingo, Dominican Republic	3rd	4 × 400 m relay	3:10.55
2010	NACAC Under-23 Championships	Miramar, United States	13th (h)	400m	48.33
2010	NACAC Under-23 Championships	Miramar, United States	—	4 × 100 m relay	DNF
2011	Central American and Caribbean Championships	Mayagüez, Puerto Rico	3rd	800m	1:54.07
2011	Central American and Caribbean Championships	Mayagüez, Puerto Rico	4th	4 × 400 m relay	3:04.10
2012	NACAC Under-23 Championships	Irapuato, Mexico	4th	400m	46.32 A
2012	NACAC Under-23 Championships	Irapuato, Mexico	3rd	4 × 400 m relay	3:07.88
2012	Olympic Games	London, United Kingdom	—	4 × 400 m relay	DQ
2014	World Relays	Nassau, Bahamas	11th (B)	4 × 400 m relay	3:03.41
2014	Ibero-American Championships	São Paulo, Brazil	10th	800m	1:56.51
2014	Central American and Caribbean Games	Xalapa, Mexico	—	800m	DNF
2014	Central American and Caribbean Games	Xalapa, Mexico	4th	4 × 400 m relay	3:02.86 A
2015	NACAC Championships	San José, Costa Rica	4th	4 × 400 m relay	3:01.73
