= Emanuel Mayers =

Trinidadian hurdler

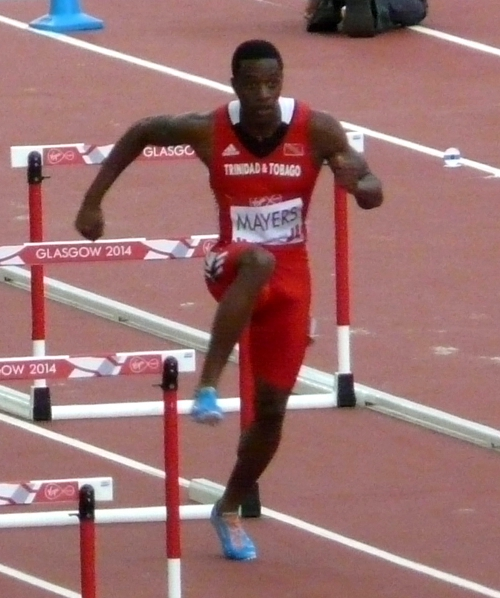
- Emanuel Mayers competing at the 2014 Commonwealth Games

Personal information
- Born: March 9, 1989 (age 37) Lakewood, New Jersey

Sport
- Country: Trinidad and Tobago
- Sport: Athletics
- Event: 400 m hurdles
- College team: Mississippi State University
Medal record
Pan American Games
Gold medal – first place	2015 Toronto	4x400 m relay

Emanuel Mayers (born 9 March 1989 in Lakewood, United States) is a Trinidadian athlete specialising in the 400 metres hurdles. He won several medals on regional medal, including two golds at the 2013 Central American and Caribbean Championships. He competed athletically for Mississippi State University as part of their Mississippi State Bulldogs track and field team.

His personal best in the event is 49.57 seconds (Port of Spain, 2014).

== Competition record ==
Year	Competition	Venue	Position	Event	Notes
Representing Trinidad and Tobago
2008	World Junior Championships	Bydgoszcz, Poland	17th (sf)	400 m hurdles	52.39
2008	World Junior Championships	Bydgoszcz, Poland	–	4 × 400 m relay	DQ
2009	Central American and Caribbean Championships	Havana, Cuba	7th	400 m hurdles	51.63
2009	Central American and Caribbean Championships	Havana, Cuba	6th	4 × 400 m relay	3:05.17
2010	NACAC U23 Championships	Miramar, United States	5th	110 m hurdles	14.21 (wind: +3.1 m/s) w
2010	NACAC U23 Championships	Miramar, United States	5th	400 m hurdles	51.77
2010	NACAC U23 Championships	Miramar, United States	3rd	4 × 400 m relay	3:07.95
2010	Central American and Caribbean Games	Mayagüez, Puerto Rico	13th (h)	400 m hurdles	55.38
2010	Central American and Caribbean Games	Mayagüez, Puerto Rico	1st	4 × 400 m relay	3:01.68
2011	Pan American Games	Guadalajara, Mexico	6th	400 m hurdles	50.00
2013	Central American and Caribbean Championships	Morelia, Mexico	1st	400 m hurdles	49.72
2013	Central American and Caribbean Championships	Morelia, Mexico	1st	4 × 400 m relay	3:02.19
2014	Commonwealth Games	Glasgow, United Kingdom	12th (h)	400 m hurdles	50.51
2015	NACAC Championships	San José, Costa Rica	4th	400m hurdles	49.95
