= Bonamy =

Bonamy is a given name and a surname that may refer to the following notable people:

== Given name ==
- Bonamy Dobrée (1891–1974), British academic, Professor of English Literature
- Bonamy Price (1807–1888), British political economist
- Vere Bonamy Fane (1863–1924), Major-General in the British Army

== Surname ==
- Cordero Bonamy (born 1988), Bahamian sprinter
- François Bonamy (1710–1786), French botanist and physician
- James Bonamy (born 1972), American pastor and former country music artist
- Olivia Bonamy (born 1972), French actress
