= LaShawn =

LaShawn is a given name. Notable people with the given name include:

- LaShawn Daniels (1977–2019), American songwriter
- LaShawn Merritt (born 1986), American track and field athlete
- La Shawn K. Ford (born 1971/72), American politician
- Lashawn Tináh Jefferies (born 1994), American actress

== See also ==
- La'Sean
- LeSean
- LeShon
