= LeSean =

LeSean is a given name. Notable people with the name include:

- LeSean McCoy (born 1988), American football player
- LeSean Thomas (born 1975), American animation producer, director, and writer

== See also ==
- La'Sean
- LaShawn
- LeShon
