= 2010 NACAC U23 Championships in Athletics =

VI NACAC Under-23 Championships in Athletics
- Dates: July 9–11
- Host city: Miramar, United States
- Venue: Ansin Sports Complex
- Level: U-23
- Events: 44
- Participation: 257 athletes from 21 nations

The 6th NACAC Under-23 Championships in Athletics were held in Miramar, Florida, United States, at the Ansin Sports Complex on July 9–11, 2010. A detailed report on the results was given.

== Medal summary ==
Detailed results can be found on the Athletics Canada website, on the Half-Mile Timing website, and on the Tilastopaja website.

=== Men ===
Event	Gold		Silver		Bronze	
100 metres (1.7 m/s)	Sam Effah (CAN)	10.06 CR	Oshane Bailey (JAM)	10.11	Maurice Mitchell (USA)	10.14
200 metres (2.8 m/s)	Curtis Mitchell (USA)	20.06w	Brandon Byram (USA)	20.46w	Rasheed Dwyer (JAM)	20.64w
400 metres	Tavaris Tate (USA)	45.36	Joey Hughes (USA)	45.79	Demetrius Pinder (BAH)	45.90
800 metres	Charles Jock (USA)	1:45.65 CR	Aaron Evans (BER)	1:47.79	Gavyn Nero (TRI)	1:48.16
1500 metres	Olivier Collin (CAN)	3:44.45 CR	Ben Blankenship (USA)	3:45.43	Anthony Berkis (CAN)	3:46.36
5000 metres	Diego Alberto Borrego (MEX)	14:32.90 CR	Mike Crouch (USA)	14:33.33	Mohamed Ige (USA)	14:38.95
10000 metres	Ahmed Osman (USA)	30:38.22	Colin Mickow (USA)	30:42.16	José Mireles (MEX)	32:38.44
3000 m steeplechase	Donn Cabral (USA)	8:52.67	Álvaro Abreu (DOM)	9:27.18	Stephen Finley (USA)	9:57.49
110 m hurdles (3.1 m/s)	Ronnie Ash (USA)	12.98w	Ryan Brathwaite (BAR)	13.10w	Johnny Dutch (USA)	13.30w
400 m hurdles	Jeshua Anderson (USA)	49.33	Winder Cuevas (DOM)	50.13	Reggie Wyatt (USA)	50.15
High jump	Paul Hamilton (USA)	2.23m	Ricky Robertson (USA)	2.23m	Jamal Wilson (BAH)	2.13m
Pole vault	Jordan Scott (USA)	5.56m CR	Deryk Theodore (CAN)	5.10m	Ryan Vu (CAN)	5.00m
Long jump	Christian Taylor (USA)	7.82m (0.0 m/s)	Chris Phipps (USA)	7.80m (-1.0 m/s)	Marcos Amalbert (PUR)	7.50m (-0.4 m/s)
Triple jump	Christian Taylor (USA)	16.66m (1.2 m/s)	Josh Como (USA)	15.95m (0.8 m/s)	J'Vente Deveaux (BAH)	15.55m (1.4 m/s)
Shot Put	Kurt Roberts (USA)	18.60m	Aaron Studt (USA)	18.21m	O'Dayne Richards (JAM)	18.03m
Discus Throw	Mason Finley (USA)	59.59 CR	Mario Cota (MEX)	58.01 NR	Nick Jones (USA)	57.03
Hammer throw	Chris Cralle (USA)	70.71m CR	Walter Henning (USA)	69.33m	Trey Henderson (CAN)	66.28m
Javelin throw	Juan José Méndez (MEX)	69.94m	Cooper Thompson (USA)	69.52m	Brian Moore (USA)	68.41m
Decathlon	Gray Horn (USA)	7510 pts CR	Nichola Trubachik (USA)	7497 pts	Reid Gustavson (CAN)	6866 pts
20000 m Walk	Isaac Palma (MEX)	1:28:53.38 CR	Jorge Zarate (MEX)	1:39:39.43	Dan Serianni (USA)	1:41:29.23
4 x 100 metres relay	United States; Fred Rose; Brandon Byram; Maurice Mitchell; Curtis Mitchell	38.96	Jamaica; Oshane Bailey; Ramone McKenzie; Jacques Harvey; Rasheed Dwyer	39.36		
4 x 400 metres relay	United States; LeJerald Betters; O'Neal Wilder; Joey Hughes; Tavaris Tate	2:58.83 CR	Bahamas; LaToy Williams; Demetrius Pinder; Jamaal Butler; La'Sean Pickstock	3:02.91	Trinidad and Tobago; Ade Alleyne-Forte; Zwede Hewitt; Gavyn Nero; Emanuel Mayers	3:07.95

=== Women ===
Event	Gold		Silver		Bronze	
100 metres (2.2 m/s)	Jeneba Tarmoh (USA)	11.00w	Samantha Henry-Robinson (JAM)	11.25w	Kenyanna Wilson (USA)	11.32w
200 metres (2.1 m/s)	Tiffany Townsend (USA)	22.92w	Kimberley Hyacinthe (CAN)	23.14w	Candyce McGrone (USA)	23.16w
400 metres	Shelise Williams (USA)	53.08	Ebony Collins (USA)	53.31	Raysa Sánchez (DOM)	54.08
800 metres	Jessica Smith (CAN)	2:04.96	Christina Rodgers (USA)	2:05.00	Anna Layman (USA)	2:05.39
1500 metres	Keri Bland (USA)	4:24.38	Jessica O'Connell (CAN)	4:25.78	Ashley Verplank (USA)	4:28.75
5000 metres	Jessica O'Connell (CAN)	17:15.73	Beatriz Hernández (MEX)	17:32.75	Tara Erdmann (USA)	18:27.49
10000 metres	Sarah Porter (USA)	36:15.51 CR	Dianna Cisneros (MEX)	36:59.66	Amanda Goetschius (USA)	37:18.81
3000 m steeplechase	Rebeka Stowe (USA)	10:08.58 CR	Stephanie Garcia (USA)	10:20.50	Sara Prieto (MEX)	10:54.34
100 m hurdles (2.3 m/s)	Tierra Brown (USA)	12.86w	Michaylin Golladay (USA)	13.07w	Rosemarie Carty (JAM)	13.22w
400 m hurdles	Tierra Brown (USA)	55.14 CR	Tameka Jameson (USA)	55.97	Nikita Tracey (JAM)	56.89
High jump	Amber Kaufman (USA)	1.86m	April Sinkler (USA)	1.81m	Paola Fuentes (MEX); Caleigh Bacchus (TRI)	1.76m
Pole vault	Gabriella Duclos-Lasnier (CAN)	4.30m	Melissa Gergel (USA)	4.10m	Ariane Beaumont-Courteau (CAN); Rachel Laurent (USA)	3.90m
Long jump	Shara Proctor (AIA)	6.43m (0.9 m/s)	Bianca Stuart (BAH)	6.42m (-0.4 m/s)	April Sinkler (USA)	6.33m (-1.5 m/s)
Triple jump	Kimberly Williams (JAM)	14.14m w (3.1 m/s)	Ashika Charan (USA)	13.35m w (2.8 m/s)	Melissa Ogbourne (JAM)	13.14m w (2.3 m/s)
Shot Put	Karen Shump (USA)	17.43m CR	Anna Jelmini (USA)	16.58m	Julie Labonté (CAN)	15.89m
Discus Throw	Anna Jelmini (USA)	56.70m CR	Jeneva McCall (USA)	56.16m	Paulina Flores (MEX)	47.49m
Hammer throw	Heather Steacy (CAN)	67.20m CR	Jeneva McCall (USA)	64.17m	Gwen Berry (USA)	62.55m
Javelin throw	Liz Gleadle (CAN)	53.72m	Fresa Núñez (DOM)	53.11m NR	Marissa Tschida (USA)	50.07m
Heptathlon	Kiani Profit (USA)	5576 pts	Dorcas Akinniyi (USA)	5204 pts	Makeba Alcide (LCA)	5172 pts NR
10000 m Walk	Erandi Uribe (MEX)	50:12.27	Lauren Forgues (USA)	51:06.38	Lizbeth Silva (MEX)	52:31.78
4 x 100 metres relay	United States; Jeneba Tarmoh; Amber Purvis; Tiffany Townsend; Kenyanna Wilson	43.07 CR	Jamaica; Rosemarie Carty; Samantha Henry-Robinson; Audrea Segree; Trisha-Ann Hawthorne	44.20	Bahamas; Charlesha Lightbourne; Yanique Clarke; Ashley Hanna; Michelle Cumberbatch	46.82
4 x 400 metres relay	United States; Ebony Collins; Amber Purvis; Shelise Williams; Tameka Jameson	3:29.80	Jamaica; Verone Chambers; Nikita Tracey; Andrea Reid; Alecia Cutenar	3:38.05	Canada; Amonn Nelson; Jessica Smith; Miana Griffiths; Sarah Wells	3:40.09

== Medal table ==
The medal count has been published.

* Host nation (United States)

Rank	Nation	Gold	Silver	Bronze	Total
1	United States*	31	25	18	74
2	Canada	7	3	7	17
3	Mexico	4	4	5	13
4	Jamaica	1	5	5	11
5	Anguilla	1	0	0	1
6	Dominican Republic	0	3	1	4
7	Bahamas	0	2	4	6
8	Barbados	0	1	0	1
8	Bermuda	0	1	0	1
10	Trinidad and Tobago	0	0	3	3
11	Puerto Rico	0	0	1	1
11	Saint Lucia	0	0	1	1
Totals (12 entries)		44	44	45	133

== Participation (unofficial) ==
A preliminary list of participating countries as of May 21, 2010, was published. According to an unofficial count, 257 athletes from 21 countries participated.

- Anguilla (4)
- Antigua and Barbuda (3)
- Bahamas (23)
- Barbados (6)
- Bermuda (2)
- British Virgin Islands (2)
- Canada (29)
- Cayman Islands (4)
- Costa Rica (4)
- Dominican Republic (15)
- Jamaica (22)
- (Mexico) México (29)
- Netherlands Antilles (4)
- Nicaragua (1)
- Puerto Rico (8)
- Saint Kitts and Nevis (5)
- Saint Lucia (2)
- Saint Vincent and the Grenadines (1)
- Trinidad and Tobago (14)
- Turks and Caicos Islands (1)
- United States (78)

Athletes from Dominica, Guatemala and Haiti appear on the result lists, but were scratched or did not show, while athletes from Cuba, El Salvador, and the United States Virgin Islands were initially announced, but do not appear on the result lists.
