= James Eichberger =

Mexican middle-distance runner

Personal information
- Nationality: Mexican
- Born: April 8, 1990 (age 35) Greenbrae, California, United States

Sport
- Sport: Athletics
- Event: 800 Meters

James Eichberger (born 4 August 1990) is a Mexican middle-distance runner who specialized in the 800 metres.

He finished fourth at the 2010 NACAC Under-23 Championships, seventh at the 2010 Ibero-American Championships, fourth at the 2013 Central American and Caribbean Championships, seventh at the 2014 Central American and Caribbean Games and eighth at the 2014 Ibero-American Championships. He also competed at the 2010 Central American and Caribbean Games, the 2013 World Championships and the 2015 Pan American Games without reaching the final.

His personal best times were 1:45.88 minutes in the 800 metres, achieved in July 2013 in Ninove; and 3:46.69 minutes in the 1500 metres, achieved in March 2012 in Tucson. Indoors he ran the 800 metres in 1:48.43 minutes in January 2011 in Fayetteville. This is the Mexican indoor record.

Eichberger competed for Catalina High School and the Arizona Wildcats track and field team. He was an All-American runner for Arizona, finishing 5th in the distance medley relay at the 2011 NCAA Division I Indoor Track and Field Championships.
