= 2014 Ibero-American Championships in Athletics – Results =

These are the results of the 2014 Ibero-American Championships in Athletics which took place from August 1 to 3, 2014, at the Estádio Ícaro de Castro Melo in São Paulo, Brazil.

== Men's results ==
=== 100 meters ===
Heats
Heat 1 – 1 August 16:10h – Temperature: 26.0 °C – Humidity: 50% – Wind: -0.2 m/s

Rank	Name	Nationality	Reaction time	Time	Notes
1	Andy Martínez	Peru	0.144	10.34	Q, NR
2	Jefferson Lucindo	Brazil	0.206	10.38	Q
3	Isidro Montoya	Colombia	0.175	10.47	q
4	Arturo Deliser	Panama	0.192	10.77	
5	Josef Norales	Honduras		10.85	

Heat 2 – 1 August 16:10h – Temperature: 25.5 °C – Humidity: 55% – Wind: +0.2 m/s

Rank	Name	Nationality	Reaction time	Time	Notes
1	Cruz Rolando Palacios	Honduras	0.213	10.59	Q
2	Matías Robledo	Argentina	0.173	10.78	Q
3	Ángel Ayala	Paraguay	0.213	10.83	
4	Enmanuel Brioso	Dominican Republic	0.217	10.87	
5	Osvaldo Alexandre	Angola	0.200	10.88	
	Álex Quiñónez	Ecuador		DNS	

Heat 3 – 1 August 16:10h – Temperature: 25.6 °C – Humidity: 55% – Wind: +0.3 m/s

Rank	Name	Nationality	Reaction time	Time	Notes
1	Jorge Vides	Brazil	0.201	10.45	Q
2	Yoandry Andújar	Dominican Republic	0.187	10.53	Q
3	Mateo Edward	Panama	0.184	10.66	q
4	Holder da Silva	Guinea-Bissau	0.204	10.72	
5	Mauro Gaspar	Angola	0.311	10.99	
6	Jesús Cáceres	Paraguay	0.230	11.38	

Final – 1 August 17:55h – Temperature: 24.0 °C – Humidity: 35% – Wind: +0.6 m/s

Rank	Name	Nationality	Reaction time	Time	Notes
1st place, gold medalist(s)	Andy Martínez	Peru	0.190	10.30	NR
2nd place, silver medalist(s)	Jorge Vides	Brazil	0.183	10.31	
3rd place, bronze medalist(s)	Isidro Montoya	Colombia	0.160	10.32	
4	Cruz Rolando Palacios	Honduras	0.190	10.34	
5	Jefferson Lucindo	Brazil	0.171	10.40	
6	Yoandry Andújar	Dominican Republic	0.216	10.43	
7	Mateo Edward	Panama	0.164	10.66	
8	Matías Robledo	Argentina	0.179	10.69	

=== 200 meters ===
Heats
Heat 1 – 2 August 15:50h – Temperature: 28.0 °C – Humidity: 25% – Wind: -1.5 m/s

Rank	Name	Nationality	Reaction time	Time	Notes
1	Bernardo Baloyes	Colombia	0.622	20.87	Q
2	Aldemir da Silva Junior	Brazil	0.211	20.94	Q
3	Luguelín Santos	Dominican Republic	0.238	21.23	Q
4	Holder da Silva	Guinea-Bissau	0.361	21.90	
5	John Zavala	Paraguay	0.300	22.01	
6	Josef Norales	Honduras	0.507	22.23	
7	Prisca Baltazar	Angola	0.233	22.41	
	Álex Quiñónez	Ecuador		DNS	

Heat 2 – 2 August 15:50h – Temperature: 28.0 °C – Humidity: 25% – Wind: -2.3 m/s

Rank	Name	Nationality	Reaction time	Time	Notes
1	Cruz Rolando Palacios	Honduras	0.256	20.91	Q
2	Jorge Vides	Brazil	0.186	20.94	Q
3	Yoandry Andújar	Dominican Republic	0.352	21.17	Q, PB
4	Andy Martínez	Peru	0.247	21.30	q, PB
5	Fredy Maidana	Paraguay	0.310	21.56	q
6	Kevin de Oliveira	Angola	0.264	22.14	PB
	Matías Robledo	Argentina		DNS	
	Joel Lynch	Panama		DNS	

Final – 3 August 10:20h – Temperature: 25.6 °C – Humidity: 45% – Wind: +0.7 m/s

Rank	Name	Nationality	Reaction time	Time	Notes
1st place, gold medalist(s)	Jorge Vides	Brazil	0.237	20.42	
2nd place, silver medalist(s)	Bernardo Baloyes	Colombia	0.565	20.43	NR
3rd place, bronze medalist(s)	Cruz Rolando Palacios	Honduras	0.245	20.60	
4	Aldemir da Silva Junior	Brazil	0.200	20.62	
5	Luguelín Santos	Dominican Republic	0.204	20.97	
6	Fredy Maidana	Paraguay	0.797	21.27	
	Yoandry Andújar	Dominican Republic	0.334	DQ	163.3
	Andy Martínez	Peru		DNS	

=== 400 meters ===
Final – 2 August 16:25h – Temperature: 24.9 °C – Humidity: 36%

Rank	Name	Nationality	Reaction time	Time	Notes
1st place, gold medalist(s)	Anderson Henriques	Brazil	0.260	45.40	
2nd place, silver medalist(s)	Pedro de Oliveira	Brazil	0.338	45.73	
3rd place, bronze medalist(s)	Nery Brenes	Costa Rica	0.210	45.97	
4	Héctor Carrasquillo	Puerto Rico	0.240	46.48	
5	Yon Soriano	Dominican Republic	0.535	47.37	
6	Juander Santos	Dominican Republic	0.366	48.06	
	Joel Lynch	Panama		DNS	

=== 800 meters ===
Final – 2 August 17:30h – Temperature: 24.0 °C – Humidity: 34%

Rank	Name	Nationality	Time	Notes
1st place, gold medalist(s)	Rafith Rodríguez	Colombia	1:44.77	CR
2nd place, silver medalist(s)	Thiago André	Brazil	1:45.99	PB
3rd place, bronze medalist(s)	Lucirio Antonio Garrido	Venezuela	1:46.60	PB
4	Jorge Liranzo	Cuba	1:47.35	
5	Álvaro de Arriba	Spain	1:47.50	
6	Tayron Reyes	Dominican Republic	1:47.72	
7	Lutimar Paes	Brazil	1:47.75	
8	James Eichberger	Mexico	1:47.78	
9	Víctor Ortíz	Costa Rica	1:53.83	
10	Joel Mejía	Dominican Republic	1:56.51	
	Tomás Squella	Chile	DNF	

=== 1500 meters ===
Final – 3 August 15:50h – Temperature: 28 °C – Humidity: 38%

Rank	Name	Nationality	Time	Notes
1st place, gold medalist(s)	Marvin Blanco	Venezuela	3:43.88	
2nd place, silver medalist(s)	Álvaro Rodríguez	Spain	3:43.91	
3rd place, bronze medalist(s)	Carlos Díaz	Chile	3:44.74	
4	Iván López	Chile	3:45.59	
5	Freddy Espinosa	Colombia	3:45.92	
6	José Juan Esparza	Mexico	3:46.48	
7	Iván Darío González	Colombia	3:47.91	
8	Lucirio Antonio Garrido	Venezuela	3:54.60	PB
9	Álvaro Abreu	Dominican Republic	3:54.70	
10	Daniel Toroya	Bolivia	3:54.95	PB
11	Georman Rivas	Costa Rica	4:00.25	
12	Thiago André	Brazil	4:14.27	
13	Tayron Reyes	Dominican Republic	4:21.19	
	Lutimar Paes	Brazil	DNF	
	Víctor Ortíz	Costa Rica	DNS	

=== 3000 meters ===
Final – 1 August 17:20h – Temperature: 27.0 °C – Humidity: 32%

Rank	Name	Nationality	Time	Notes
1st place, gold medalist(s)	Juan Luis Barrios	Mexico	7:59.50	
2nd place, silver medalist(s)	Bayron Piedra	Ecuador	7:59.55	
3rd place, bronze medalist(s)	Carlos dos Santos	Brazil	8:01.19	
4	Alberto Sánchez	Spain	8:01.22	PB
5	Joilson da Silva	Brazil	8:02.54	
6	Javier Carriqueo	Argentina	8:07.31	
7	Iván López	Chile	8:12.46	
8	Iván Darío González	Colombia	8:12.51	PB
9	Daniel Toroya	Bolivia	8:18.56	NR
	José Mauricio González	Colombia	DNF	
	Flavio Seholhe	Mozambique	DNS	

=== 5000 meters ===
Final – 3 August 09:30h – Temperature: 25.6 °C – Humidity: 45%

Rank	Name	Nationality	Time	Notes
1st place, gold medalist(s)	Bayron Piedra	Ecuador	13:50.20	
2nd place, silver medalist(s)	Altobeli da Silva	Brazil	13:54.65	
3rd place, bronze medalist(s)	Iván Fernández	Spain	13:59.61	
4	Víctor Aravena	Chile	14:08.81	
5	Gerad Giraldo	Colombia	14:17.04	PB
6	Nicolás Cuestas	Uruguay	14:39.50	
7	Andrés Zamora	Uruguay	14:55.62	PB
	Joilson da Silva	Brazil	DNF	
	Javier Carriqueo	Argentina	DNF	
	Rubén Sança	Cape Verde	DNS	
	José Mauricio González	Colombia	DNS	

=== 3000 meters steeplechase ===
Final – 1 August 16:45h – Temperature: 27.0 °C – Humidity: 32%

Rank	Name	Nationality	Time	Notes
1st place, gold medalist(s)	Marvin Blanco	Venezuela	8:35.87	
2nd place, silver medalist(s)	Fernando Carro	Spain	8:39.66	
3rd place, bronze medalist(s)	Tomás Tajadura	Spain	8:40.32	
4	Luis Enrique Ibarra	Mexico	8:50.03	
5	Gerard Giraldo	Colombia	8:51.55	
6	Leandro Oliveira	Brazil	8:52.18	PB
7	Mauricio Valdivia	Chile	8:58.51	
8	Álvaro Abreu	Dominican Republic	8:59.83	
9	Jean Machado	Brazil	9:11.87	

=== 110 meters hurdles ===
Heats
Heat 1 – 2 August 10:00h – Temperature: 21.8 °C – Humidity: 63% – Wind: -1.5 m/s

Rank	Name	Nationality	Reaction time	Time	Notes
1	Javier McFarlane	Peru	0.191	13.57	Q, NR
2	Jonatha Mendes	Brazil	0.120	13.72	Q
3	Agustín Carrera	Argentina	0.174	13.74	Q, =NR
4	Genaro Rodríguez	Mexico	0.197	14.09	q
5	Luis David Escobar	Ecuador	0.160	14.50	

Heat 2 – 2 August 10:00h – Temperature: 23.1° – Humidity: 63% – Wind: +1.2 m/s

Rank	Name	Nationality	Reaction time	Time	Notes
1	Eder Souza	Brazil	0.176	13.62	Q
2	Jorge McFarlane	Peru	0.197	13.63	Q
3	Javier Colomo	Spain	0.199	14.20	Q
4	Cristián Alzate	Colombia	0.200	14.28	q

Final – 2 August 18:30h – Temperature: 21.5 °C – Humidity: 51% – Wind: -0.3 m/s

Rank	Name	Nationality	Reaction time	Time	Notes
1st place, gold medalist(s)	Jorge McFarlane	Peru	0.176	13.53	NR
2nd place, silver medalist(s)	Javier McFarlane	Peru	0.259	13.57	=PB
3rd place, bronze medalist(s)	Jonatha Mendes	Brazil	0.164	13.70	
4	Eder Souza	Brazil	0.154	13.75	
5	Agustín Carrera	Argentina	0.167	13.80	
6	Cristián Alzate	Colombia	0.185	14.05	
	Javier Colomo	Spain	0.219	DNF	
	Genaro Rodríguez	Mexico	0.202	DQ	

=== 400 meters hurdles ===
Heats
Heat 1 – 1 August 15:30h – Temperature: 25.5 °C – Humidity: 50%

Rank	Name	Nationality	Reaction time	Time	Notes
1	Mahau Suguimati	Brazil	0.313	51.14	Q
2	Andrés Silva	Uruguay	0.228	51.22	Q
3	Emerson Chalá	Ecuador	0.328	51.26	Q
4	Winder Cuevas	Dominican Republic	0.482	52.08	q
5	Yeferson Valencia	Colombia	0.868	56.55	

Heat 2 – 1 August 15:30h – Temperature: 25.5 °C – Humidity: 55%

Rank	Name	Nationality	Reaction time	Time	Notes
1	Eric Alejandro	Puerto Rico	0.363	51.15	Q
2	Gerald Drummond	Costa Rica	0.303	51.58	Q
3	Artur Terezan	Brazil	0.222	51.85	Q
4	Robert Díez	Spain	0.274	52.23	q
5	Luis David Escobar	Ecuador	0.408	52.46	
6	Jaime Rodríguez	Argentina	0.411	52.71	

Final – 2 August 17:00h – Temperature: 23.9 °C – Humidity: 36%

Rank	Name	Nationality	Reaction time	Time	Notes
1st place, gold medalist(s)	Andrés Silva	Uruguay	0.227	48.65	CR, NR
2nd place, silver medalist(s)	Eric Alejandro	Puerto Rico	0.319	49.07	PB
3rd place, bronze medalist(s)	Mahau Suguimati	Brazil	0.326	49.99	
4	Gerald Drummond	Costa Rica	0.304	50.41	NR
5	Emerson Chalá	Ecuador	0.385	50.58	
6	Winder Cuevas	Dominican Republic	0.243	50.65	
7	Artur Terezan	Brazil	0.287	50.74	
8	Robert Diez	Spain	0.246	1.34.22	

=== High jump ===
Final – 3 August 15:05h – Temperature: 27.5–27.4 °C – Humidity: 23 – 20%

Rank	Name	Nationality	1.95	2.00	2.05	2.10	2.15	2.18	2.21	2.24	2.26	2.28	2.31	Result	Notes
1st place, gold medalist(s)	Edgar Rivera	Mexico	–	–	–	o	o	–	o	xo	x-	o	xxx	2.28	=PB
2nd place, silver medalist(s)	Luis Joel Castro	Puerto Rico	–	–	–	–	o	o	o	xxo	o	xxx		2.26	=NR
3rd place, bronze medalist(s)	Guilherme Cobbo	Brazil	–	–	–	o	o	–	o	xxo	xxx			2.24	
4	Carlos Layoy	Argentina	–	o	–	o	o	–	xxo	xxx				2.21	
5	Talles Silva	Brazil	–	–	–	o	o	o	xxx					2.18	
6	Alexander Bowen	Panama	–	–	–	o	o	xxx						2.15	
7	Paulo Conceição	Portugal	–	–	–	o	xxx							2.10	
	Marlon Colorado	El Salvador	xxx											NM	

=== Pole vault ===
Final – 3 August 09:05h – Temperature: 19.3–22.6 °C – Humidity: 70 – 55%

Rank	Name	Nationality	4.80	4.90	5.00	5.10	5.20	5.25	5.30	5.35	Result	Notes
1st place, gold medalist(s)	Germán Chiaraviglio	Argentina	–	–	–	–	o	–	–	xxx	5.20	
1st place, gold medalist(s)	José Rodolfo Pacho	Ecuador	–	–	o	o	o	–	xxx		5.20	NR
3rd place, bronze medalist(s)	João Gabriel Sousa	Brazil	–	–	–	–	xo	–	xxx		5.20	
4	Daniel Zupeuc	Chile	o	–	o	xxx					5.00	
5	Jorge Montes	Dominican Republic	xxo	–	xxx						4.80	
	Fábio Gomes da Silva	Brazil	–	–	–	–	–	–	xxx		NM	

=== Long jump ===
Final – 2 August 15:20h – Temperature: 26.4–24.9 °C – Humidity: 28 – 36%

Rank	Name	Nationality	#1	#2	#3	#4	#5	#6	Result	Notes
1st place, gold medalist(s)	Luis Alberto Rivera	Mexico	8.24 (0.1 m/s)	x (-0.2 m/s)	–	–	–	–	8.24 (0.1 m/s)	
2nd place, silver medalist(s)	Higor Alves	Brazil	7.74 (1.7 m/s)	x (0.9 m/s)	x (0.0 m/s)	8.00 (2.0 m/s)	7.86 (0.0 m/s)	7.73 (-0.1 m/s)	8.00 (2.0 m/s)	
3rd place, bronze medalist(s)	Luis Felipe Méliz	Spain	7.72 (0.0 m/s)	7.76 (-1.4 m/s)	x (0.9 m/s)	7.74 (1.4 m/s)	–	x (-1.3 m/s)	7.76 (-1.4 m/s)	
4	Emiliano Lasa	Uruguay	7.66 (-0.8 m/s)	x (0.7 m/s)	7.57 (-0.5 m/s)	7.56 w (2.6 m/s)	7.64 (1.0 m/s)	7.55 (0.0 m/s)	7.66 (-0.8 m/s)	
5	Jhamal Bowen	Panama	7.25 (-2.6 m/s)	x (1.0 m/s)	7.33 (0.7 m/s)	7.55 (1.3 m/s)	7.48 (-0.5 m/s)	7.60 w (2.4 m/s)	7.60 w (2.4 m/s)	
6	Mauro Vinícius da Silva	Brazil	x (2.0 m/s)	7.56 (0.1 m/s)	x (0.3 m/s)	4.07 (1.9 m/s)	7.51 (0.9 m/s)	7.47 (0.3 m/s)	7.56 (0.1 m/s)	
7	Eddy Florián	Dominican Republic	7.19 (0.0 m/s)	x (0.3 m/s)	7.01 (0.2 m/s)	7.23 (1.1 m/s)	7.26 (0.2 m/s)	x (0.8 m/s)	7.26 (0.2 m/s)	
8	Alaín Sotolongo	Cuba	7.24 (-0.8 m/s)	x (-2.7 m/s)	x (0.4 m/s)	6.62 (1.4 m/s)	7.22 (-1.5 m/s)	x (1.6 m/s)	7.24 (-0.8 m/s)	

=== Triple jump ===
Final – 3 August 15:10h – Temperature: 27.3–26.9 °C – Humidity: 24 – 24%

Rank	Name	Nationality	#1	#2	#3	#4	#5	#6	Result	Notes
1st place, gold medalist(s)	Jonathan Henrique Silva	Brazil	16.25 (0.4 m/s)	16.73 w (2.3 m/s)	16.65 (0.9 m/s)	16.84 (1.3 m/s)	16.70 (1.5 m/s)	x (-1.1 m/s)	16.84 (1.3 m/s)	
2nd place, silver medalist(s)	Kauam Bento	Brazil	16.19 (1.0 m/s)	16.37 (1.6 m/s)	16.79 (1.5 m/s)	x (- m/s)	x (- m/s)	x (-0.6 m/s)	16.79 (1.5 m/s)	
3rd place, bronze medalist(s)	Alberto Álvarez	Mexico	16.31 (0.7 m/s)	16.05 (0.3 m/s)	x (0.7 m/s)	16.29 (0.3 m/s)	16.21 (1.1 m/s)	x (1.8 m/s)	16.31 (0.7 m/s)	
4	Jhon Murillo	Colombia	16.15 (-1.1 m/s)	16.06 (1.5 m/s)	15.65 (0.3 m/s)	15.90 (-0.3 m/s)	–	16.09 (1.4 m/s)	16.15 (-1.1 m/s)	
5	Carlos Veiga	Portugal	15.78 (-0.3 m/s)	x (0.2 m/s)	15.86 (1.4 m/s)	13.97 (0.1 m/s)	15.84 (0.3 m/s)	x (0.9 m/s)	15.86 (1.4 m/s)	
6	José Bellido	Spain	15.76 (0.2 m/s)	x w (3.0 m/s)	15.53 (1.4 m/s)	x (-0.1 m/s)	x (0.3 m/s)	x (0.6 m/s)	15.76 (0.2 m/s)	
7	Eddy Florián	Dominican Republic	x (-0.8 m/s)	15.49 (0.6 m/s)	x (0.7 m/s)	x (-0.4 m/s)	x (0.4 m/s)	x (1.7 m/s)	15.49 (0.6 m/s)	

=== Shot put ===
Final – 3 August 15:35h – Temperature: 28.3–28.3 °C – Humidity: 20 – 20%

Rank	Name	Nationality	#1	#2	#3	#4	#5	#6	Result	Notes
1st place, gold medalist(s)	Germán Lauro	Argentina	18.35	19.57	20.14	x	x	x	20.14	
2nd place, silver medalist(s)	Darlan Romani	Brazil	x	19.54	19.06	19.64	x	x	19.64	
3rd place, bronze medalist(s)	Stephen Sáenz	Mexico	18.25	x	x	x	18.62	x	18.62	
4	Aldo González	Bolivia	17.14	17.12	x	16.93	16.98	17.01	17.14	
5	Maximiliano Alonso	Chile	x	16.70	16.69	x	16.24	16.67	16.70	
6	Raiber Pérez	Dominican Republic	14.75	15.54	16.06	x	x	x	16.06	PB
	Nelson Henrique Fernandes	Brazil							DNS	

=== Discus throw ===
Final – 2 August 19:00h – Temperature: 20.1–17.1 °C – Humidity: 59 – 72%

Rank	Name	Nationality	#1	#2	#3	#4	#5	#6	Result	Notes
1st place, gold medalist(s)	Germán Lauro	Argentina	59.13	x	60.40	61.62	59.39	58.62	61.62	
2nd place, silver medalist(s)	Felipe Lorenzon	Brazil	54.85	x	x	59.10	x	59.85	59.85	PB
3rd place, bronze medalist(s)	Ronald Julião	Brazil	56.24	56.05	57.59	58.44	59.75	57.66	59.75	
4	Mauricio Ortega	Colombia	x	58.91	59.10	x	58.87	58.88	59.10	
5	Andrés Rossini	Argentina	55.63	55.31	56.35	57.37	56.38	56.12	57.37	
6	Jorge Grave	Portugal	56.19	56.81	x	x	53.32	x	56.81	
7	Mario Cota	Mexico	55.37	56.59	56.50	55.55	56.80	x	56.80	
8	Juan Caicedo	Ecuador	x	x	54.55	x	x	x	54.55	
9	Maximiliano Alonso	Chile	53.73	x	x				53.73	

=== Hammer throw ===
Final – 1 August 15:40h – Temperature: 27.5–26.9 °C – Humidity: 31 – 32%

Rank	Name	Nationality	#1	#2	#3	#4	#5	#6	Result	Notes
1st place, gold medalist(s)	Wagner Domingos	Brazil	71.68	74.11	x	74.12	x	x	74.12	NR
2nd place, silver medalist(s)	Allan Wolski	Brazil	68.11	x	70.81	x	68.74	68.46	70.81	
3rd place, bronze medalist(s)	Dário Manso	Portugal	65.45	67.26	67.16	69.37	x	69.03	69.37	
4	Roberto Sawyers	Costa Rica	66.20	69.11	66.06	67.57	67.98	67.33	69.11	
5	Juan Ignacio Cerra	Argentina	67.96	x	67.94	66.16	67.06	x	67.96	
6	Roberto Sáez	Chile	62.80	62.63	61.51	63.29	x	61.05	63.29	
7	Guillermo Braulio	Ecuador	58.37	x	59.56	x	55.69	x	59.56	

=== Javelin throw ===
Final – 3 August 16:25h – Temperature: 26.7–25.2 °C – Humidity: 20 – 20%

Rank	Name	Nationality	#1	#2	#3	#4	#5	#6	Result	Notes
1st place, gold medalist(s)	Dayron Márquez	Colombia	77.18	76.77	77.24	78.30	78.80	76.52	78.80	
2nd place, silver medalist(s)	Júlio César de Oliveira	Brazil	77.20	x	x	x	73.11	78.04	78.04	
3rd place, bronze medalist(s)	Víctor Fatecha	Paraguay	70.66	72.82	74.73	–	–	x	74.73	
4	Juan José Méndez	Mexico	68.91	70.64	x	66.11	x	70.65	70.65	
5	Lucas da Silva	Brazil	63.57	x	64.21	69.35	x	66.47	69.35	
6	Dawin García	Dominican Republic	57.52	x	–	–	–	–	57.52	

=== Decathlon ===
Final

The highest mark recorded in each event is highlighted in yellow

Rank	Name	Nationality	100m	LJ	SP	HJ	400m	110m H	DT	PV	JT	1500m	Points	Notes
1st place, gold medalist(s)	Felipe Santos	Brazil	10.79 (0.7); 908	7.27 (1.1); 878	13.67 708	2.01 813	48.16 901	14.43 (+0.8); 920	38.52 635	4.40 731	58.52 716	4:53.17 600	7810	PB
2nd place, silver medalist(s)	Jorge Ureña	Spain	11.05 (0.7); 850	7.14 (0.6); 847	12.18 617	1.95 758	49.37 844	14.20 (+0.8); 949	34.09 545	4.70 819	56.63 687	4:32.59 728	7644	
3rd place, bronze medalist(s)	Guillermo Ruggeri	Argentina	11.00 (0.7); 861	6.91 (-0.4); 792	12.19 618	1.92 731	48.47 886	14.51 (+0.8); 910	39.88 662	4.00 617	50.80 600	4:53.59 597	7274	
4	Gonzalo Barroilhet	Chile	11.28 (0.7); 799	6.94 (1.5); 799	14.20 741	2.04 840	51.23 759	14.55 (+0.8); 905	44.50 757	4.80 849	54.93 662	DNF 0	7111	
5	Pedro Franco de Lima	Brazil	11.45 (0.7); 763	6.80 (0.2); 767	11.70 588	1.95 758	50.79 779	15.59 (+0.8); 780	37.32 610	4.40 731	48.76 570	4:46.11 642	6988	
6	Matías Dallaserra	Chile	11.31 (0.7); 793	6.45 (1.5); 686	13.47 696	1.86 679	50.48 793	15.80 (+0.8); 755	34.74 558	4.20 673	43.92 499	4:26.24 769	6901	PB
	Román Gastaldi	Argentina	11.03 (0.7); 854	7.03 (2.7); 821	13.99 728	1.95 758	50.22 804	15.42 (+0.8); 799	44.00 746	NM 0	DNS 0		DNF	
	Marcos Sánchez	Puerto Rico	11.30 (0.7); 795	6.93 (1.8); 797	DNS 0	–	–	–	–	–	–	–	DNF	

=== 20,000 meters walk ===
Final – 2 August 18:50h – Temperature: 17.0 °C – Humidity: 71%

Rank	Name	Nationality	Time	Notes
1st place, gold medalist(s)	Iván Garrido	Colombia	1:22:13.74	PB
2nd place, silver medalist(s)	Marc Tur	Spain	1:23:22.19	PB
3rd place, bronze medalist(s)	Yerko Araya	Chile	1:23:34.68	
4	Caio Bonfim	Brazil	1:24:49.52	
5	Richard Vargas	Venezuela	1:25:01.16	
6	Julio César Salazar	Mexico	1:26:01.13	PB
	Juan Manuel Cano	Argentina	DQ	230.1
	James Rendón	Colombia	DQ	230.1
	Moacir Zimmermann	Brazil	DQ	230.1
	Gabriel Calvo	Costa Rica	DNF	

=== 4 × 100 meters relay ===
Final – 3 August 16:50h – Temperature: 26.9 °C – Humidity: 24%

Rank	Nation	Competitors	Time	Notes
1st place, gold medalist(s)	Brazil	Luís Gabriel Silva; Jefferson Lucindo; Aldemir da Silva Junior; Jorge Vides	39.35	
2nd place, silver medalist(s)	Dominican Republic	Enmanuel Brioso; Carlos Oroza; Stanley del Carmen; Yoandry Andújar	39.92	
3rd place, bronze medalist(s)	Angola	Mauro Gaspar; Osvaldo Alexandre; Prisca Baltazar; Kevin de Oliveira	41.12	
4	Paraguay	John Zavala; Fredy Maidana; Jesús Cáceres; Ángel Ayala	41.34	NR
	Colombia	Bernardo Baloyes; Isidro Montoya	DNS	

=== 4 × 400 meters relay ===
Final – 3 August 11:20h – Temperature: 25.2 °C – Humidity: 47%

Rank	Nation	Competitors	Time	Notes
1st place, gold medalist(s)	Dominican Republic	Winder Cuevas; Yon Soriano; Juander Santos; Luguelín Santos	3:02.73	
2nd place, silver medalist(s)	Brazil	Pedro de Oliveira; Wagner Cardoso; Hederson Estefani; Anderson Henriques	3:02.80	
	Colombia	Jhon Murillo; Bernardo Baloyes; Isidro Montoya; Rafith Rodríguez	DNS	

== Women's results ==
=== 100 meters ===
Final – 1 August 17:40h – Temperature: 25.0 °C – Humidity: 35% – Wind: +0.0 m/s

Rank	Name	Nationality	Reaction time	Time	Notes
1st place, gold medalist(s)	Ana Cláudia Lemos Silva	Brazil	0.159	11.13	CR
2nd place, silver medalist(s)	Eliecit Palacios	Colombia	0.250	11.40	
3rd place, bronze medalist(s)	Franciela Krasucki Davide	Brazil	0.195	11.43	
4	María Victoria Woodward	Argentina	0.382	11.60	PB
5	Narcisa Landázuri	Ecuador	0.248	11.61	
6	Margarita Manzueta	Dominican Republic	0.248	11.83	
7	Fany Chalas	Dominican Republic	0.196	11.97	
8	Tracy Joseph	Costa Rica	0.351	12.18	

=== 200 meters ===
Heats
Heat 1 – 2 August 15:30h – Temperature: 28.0 °C – Humidity: 25% – Wind: -0.7 m/s

Rank	Name	Nationality	Reaction time	Time	Notes
1	Franciela Krasucki Davide	Brazil	0.239	24.05	Q
2	Narcisa Landázuri	Ecuador	0.284	24.05	Q
3	Margarita Manzueta	Dominican Republic	0.225	24.38	Q
4	Paola Mautino	Peru	0.319	25.66	
	Tracy Joseph	Costa Rica		DNS	
	Ruth-Cassandra Hunt	Panama		DNS	

Heat 2 – 2 August 15:30h – Temperature: 28.0 °C – Humidity: 25% – Wind: -0.7 m/s

Rank	Name	Nationality	Reaction time	Time	Notes
1	Vanusa dos Santos	Brazil	0.235	23.66	Q
2	María Alejandra Idrobo	Colombia	0.310	24.07	Q
3	Shantely Scott	Costa Rica	0.248	24.21	Q
4	María Victoria Woodward	Argentina	0.695	24.41	q, PB
5	Fany Chalas	Dominican Republic	0.259	24.62	q
	Maitte Torres	Peru		DQ	

Final – 3 August 10:00h – Temperature: 25.6 °C – Humidity: 45% – Wind: +0.2 m/s

Rank	Name	Nationality	Reaction time	Time	Notes
1st place, gold medalist(s)	Franciela Krasucki Davide	Brazil	0.202	23.41	
2nd place, silver medalist(s)	Narcisa Landázuri	Ecuador	0.279	23.60	PB
3rd place, bronze medalist(s)	Vanusa dos Santos	Brazil	0.229	23.64	
4	María Alejandra Idrobo	Colombia	0.254	23.68	
5	Shantely Scott	Costa Rica	0.259	24.12	
6	María Victoria Woodward	Argentina	0.533	24.13	PB
7	Margarita Manzueta	Dominican Republic	0.349	24.25	
	Fany Chalas	Dominican Republic		DQ	

=== 400 meters ===
Final – 2 August 16:10h – Temperature: 28.0 °C – Humidity: 25%

Rank	Name	Nationality	Reaction time	Time	Notes
1st place, gold medalist(s)	Geisa Coutinho	Brazil	0.279	51.76	
2nd place, silver medalist(s)	Jenifer Padilla	Colombia	0.268	52.72	
3rd place, bronze medalist(s)	Joelma Sousa	Brazil	0.680	53.04	
4	María Mackenna	Chile	0.324	54.47	
5	Desire Bermúdez	Costa Rica	0.415	55.36	
6	Maitte Torres	Peru	0.473	56.25	

=== 800 meters ===
Final – 2 August 17:15h – Temperature: 23.9 °C – Humidity: 36%

Rank	Name	Nationality	Time	Notes
1st place, gold medalist(s)	Gabriela Medina	Mexico	2:03.17	
2nd place, silver medalist(s)	Cristina Guevara	Mexico	2:03.22	PB
3rd place, bronze medalist(s)	Marta Pen	Portugal	2:05.18	PB
4	Jéssica dos Santos	Brazil	2:06.36	
5	Mariana Borelli	Argentina	2:06.96	PB
6	Tatiane da Silva	Brazil	2:07.61	
7	Felismina Cavela	Angola	2:12.34	
8	Evangelina Thomas	Argentina	2:16.05	
	Déborah Rodríguez	Uruguay	DNS	

=== 1500 meters ===
Final – 3 August 15:30h – Temperature: 30.0 °C – Humidity: 54%

Rank	Name	Nationality	Time	Notes
1st place, gold medalist(s)	Muriel Coneo	Colombia	4:14.42	
2nd place, silver medalist(s)	Cristina Guevara	Mexico	4:16.09	
3rd place, bronze medalist(s)	Juliana Paula dos Santos	Brazil	4:16.48	
4	Marta Pen	Portugal	4:20.00	PB
5	Solange Pereira	Spain	4:21.26	
6	Fabiana Cristine da Silva	Brazil	4:22.05	
7	Eliona Delgado	Peru	4:23.04	PB
8	María del Carmen Osorio	Venezuela	4:23.27	
9	Mariana Borelli	Argentina	4:24.13	PB
10	Yoni Ninahuamán	Peru	4:31.22	
11	María Mancebo	Dominican Republic	4:34.99	
12	Felismina Cavela	Angola	4:41.29	PB
13	Beverly Ramos	Puerto Rico	4:59.04	
	Evangelina Thomas	Argentina	DNF	

=== 3000 meters ===
Final – 1 August 17:00h – Temperature: 27.0 °C – Humidity: 32%

Rank	Name	Nationality	Time	Notes
1st place, gold medalist(s)	Juliana Paula dos Santos	Brazil	9:19.80	PB
2nd place, silver medalist(s)	Muriel Coneo	Colombia	9:22.10	PB
3rd place, bronze medalist(s)	Eliona Delgado	Peru	9:23.10	PB
4	Claudia Pereira	Portugal	9:25.56	
5	Tatiele de Carvalho	Brazil	9:32.91	
6	Soledad Torre	Peru	9:34.82	
7	María del Carmen Osorio	Venezuela	10:16.34	
	Aldy Gonzales	Honduras	DNS	

=== 5000 meters ===
Final – 3 August 16:10h – Temperature: 26.9 °C – Humidity: 24%

Rank	Name	Nationality	Time	Notes
1st place, gold medalist(s)	Inés Melchor	Peru	15:58.85	
2nd place, silver medalist(s)	Cruz Nonata da Silva	Brazil	16:02.40	
3rd place, bronze medalist(s)	Catarina Ribeiro	Portugal	16:05.45	
4	Sandra López	Mexico	16:05.51	
5	Tatiele de Carvalho	Brazil	16:12.32	
6	Carmen Martínez	Paraguay	16:13.28	PB
7	Maritza Arenas	Mexico	16:20.17	
8	Marta Silvestre	Spain	16:33.42	
9	Soledad Torre	Peru	16:41.41	
10	Claudia Pereira	Portugal	17:05.00	
	Ángela Figueroa	Colombia	DNS	

=== 3000 meters steeplechase ===
Final – 1 August 16:30h – Temperature: 27.0 °C – Humidity: 32%

Rank	Name	Nationality	Time	Notes
1st place, gold medalist(s)	María Mancebo	Dominican Republic	9:45.84	NR
2nd place, silver medalist(s)	Zulema Arenas	Peru	9:53.42	NR, AJR
3rd place, bronze medalist(s)	Beverly Ramos	Puerto Rico	10:03.12	
4	Eliane Pereira	Brazil	10:11.35	
5	Cynthia Paucar	Peru	10:12.18	
6	Tatiane da Silva	Brazil	10:17.00	PB
7	Rolanda Bell	Panama	10:24.74	
8	Ángela Figueroa	Colombia	10:29.83	
9	Melinda Martínez	Puerto Rico	10:36.63	
10	Azucena Ríos	Mexico	10:39.86	
11	Aldy Gonzales	Honduras	11:51.07	

=== 100 meters hurdles ===
Final – 3 August 15:15h – Temperature: 30.0 °C – Humidity: 33% – Wind: +0.1 m/s

Rank	Name	Nationality	Reaction time	Time	Notes
1st place, gold medalist(s)	LaVonne Idlette	Dominican Republic	0.237	12.99	
2nd place, silver medalist(s)	Yveth Lewis	Panama	0.208	13.05	
3rd place, bronze medalist(s)	Lina Flores	Colombia	0.159	13.18	
4	Briggite Merlano	Colombia	0.169	13.22	
5	Fabiana Moraes	Brazil	0.170	13.28	
6	Giselle de Albuquerque	Brazil	0.199	13.42	
7	Diana Bazalar	Peru	0.597	13.90	

=== 400 meters hurdles ===
Final – 2 August 16:45h – Temperature: 23.9 °C – Humidity: 36%

Rank	Name	Nationality	Reaction time	Time	Notes
1st place, gold medalist(s)	Zudikey Rodríguez	Mexico	0.501	56.64	
2nd place, silver medalist(s)	Déborah Rodríguez	Uruguay	0.635	57.56	
3rd place, bronze medalist(s)	Sharolyn Scott	Costa Rica	0.414	58.10	
4	Fernanda da Fonseca	Brazil	0.366	58.43	
5	Liliane Fernandes	Brazil	0.382	1:01.86	

=== High jump ===
Final – 1 August 17:30h – Temperature: 23.5–20.9 °C – Humidity: 41-48%

Rank	Name	Nationality	1.65	1.70	1.75	1.78	1.82	1.85	Result	Notes
1st place, gold medalist(s)	Mónica de Freitas	Brazil	–	–	o	o	xo	xxx	1.82	
2nd place, silver medalist(s)	Betsabé Páez	Argentina	o	o	o	xxx			1.75	
3rd place, bronze medalist(s)	Tamara de Sousa	Brazil	xo	o	xxo	xxx			1.75	
4	Kashany Ríos	Panama	–	xo	xxx				1.70	

=== Pole vault ===
Final – 1 August 15:45h – Temperature: 27.3–26.1 °C – Humidity: 29- 44%

Rank	Name	Nationality	3.40	3.60	3.80	3.90	4.00	4.10	4.20	Result	Notes
1st place, gold medalist(s)	Patrícia dos Santos	Brazil	–	–	o	xo	xo	o	xxx	4.10	
2nd place, silver medalist(s)	Karla Rosa da Silva	Brazil	–	–	–	–	–	xo	xxx	4.10	
3rd place, bronze medalist(s)	Valeria Chiaraviglio	Argentina	–	–	o	o	o	xxo	xxx	4.10	
	Hiyadilis Melo	Dominican Republic	xxx							NM	

=== Long jump ===
Final – 1 August 16:00h – Temperature: 27.0–23.5 °C – Humidity: 31 – 40%

Rank	Name	Nationality	#1	#2	#3	#4	#5	#6	Result	Notes
1st place, gold medalist(s)	Juliet Itoya	Spain	x (0.0 m/s)	6.32 (-0.4 m/s)	x (-0.3 m/s)	6.25 (0.0 m/s)	x (-0.1 m/s)	6.64 (0.0 m/s)	6.64 (0.0 m/s)	PB
2nd place, silver medalist(s)	Yuliana Angulo	Ecuador	x (-0.3 m/s)	6.11 (-0.9 m/s)	6.33 (-0.6 m/s)	6.32 (0.6 m/s)	x (-0.3 m/s)	x (0.5 m/s)	6.33 (-0.6 m/s)	NR
3rd place, bronze medalist(s)	Eliane Martins	Brazil	x (0.3 m/s)	x (-1.0 m/s)	5.86 (0.8 m/s)	6.31 (1.1 m/s)	6.00 (0.7 m/s)	6.13 (-0.2 m/s)	6.31 (1.1 m/s)	
4	Vanessa Seles	Brazil	6.02 (1.4 m/s)	6.01 (1.2 m/s)	6.03 (0.6 m/s)	6.17 (-1.2 m/s)	6.10 (0.0 m/s)	5.97 (0.1 m/s)	6.17 (-1.2 m/s)	
5	Paola Mautino	Peru	5.89 (0.0 m/s)	x (-0.5 m/s)	x (0.3 m/s)	x w (2.3 m/s)	5.76 (0.6 m/s)	6.04 (-0.8 m/s)	6.04 (-0.8 m/s)	
6	Munich Tovar	Venezuela	x w (2.9 m/s)	x (-0.5 m/s)	5.97 (-0.4 m/s)	x (0.1 m/s)	x (1.5 m/s)	x (-0.2 m/s)	5.97 (-0.4 m/s)	

=== Triple jump ===
Final – 2 August 16:55h – Temperature: 22.9–22.1 °C – Humidity: 43 – 51%

Rank	Name	Nationality	#1	#2	#3	#4	#5	#6	Result	Notes
1st place, gold medalist(s)	Yosiri Urrutia	Colombia	13.61 (1.5 m/s)	14.40 (0.8 m/s)	14.31 (0.7 m/s)	14.41 (1.2 m/s)	14.24 w (2.4 m/s)	13.91 (0.5 m/s)	14.41 (1.2 m/s)	
2nd place, silver medalist(s)	Gisele de Oliveira	Brazil	13.66 (1.3 m/s)	13.58 (1.3 m/s)	13.71 (0.7 m/s)	x (1.2 m/s)	13.51 (0.8 m/s)	13.60 (1.3 m/s)	13.71 (0.7 m/s)	
3rd place, bronze medalist(s)	Tânia da Silva	Brazil	12.58 w (2.3 m/s)	12.94 w (2.2 m/s)	13.39 (1.2 m/s)	13.47 (1.3 m/s)	x (1.0 m/s)	13.27 (1.1 m/s)	13.47 (1.3 m/s)	
4	Miriam Reyes	Peru	12.94 (1.7 m/s)	x (1.3 m/s)	13.02 (0.6 m/s)	12.96 (0.9 m/s)	13.19 (1.3 m/s)	x (1.2 m/s)	13.19 (1.3 m/s)	PB
5	Silvana Segura	Peru	12.36 (1.2 m/s)	12.49 (1.4 m/s)	12.33 (1.1 m/s)	12.57 (1.4 m/s)	12.45 (1.3 m/s)	x (1.3 m/s)	12.57 (1.4 m/s)	

=== Shot put ===
Final – 3 August 09:10h – Temperature: 19–25.6 °C – Humidity: 69% – 45%

Rank	Name	Nationality	#1	#2	#3	#4	#5	#6	Result	Notes
1st place, gold medalist(s)	Natalia Ducó	Chile	x	17.22	x	17.53	16.99	17.14	17.53	
2nd place, silver medalist(s)	Sandra Lemos	Colombia	x	16.84	17.10	x	x	x	17.10	
3rd place, bronze medalist(s)	Keely Medeiros	Brazil	x	16.49	16.87	16.95	x	x	16.95	
	Izabela da Silva	Brazil							DNS	
	Salome Mugabe	Mozambique							DNS	

=== Discus throw ===
Final – 2 August 15:15h – Temperature: 27.1–25.7 °C – Humidity: 20 – 33%

Rank	Name	Nationality	#1	#2	#3	#4	#5	#6	Result	Notes
1st place, gold medalist(s)	Karen Gallardo	Chile	57.79	57.11	56.13	59.66	57.11	57.95	59.66	
2nd place, silver medalist(s)	Fernanda Raquel Borges Martins	Brazil	x	59.08	x	57.67	x	x	59.08	
3rd place, bronze medalist(s)	Andressa de Morais	Brazil	54.28	x	57.60	57.82	x	54.88	57.82	
4	Bárbara Rocío Comba	Argentina	53.50	x	56.89	57.57	55.47	x	57.57	
5	Aixa Middleton	Panama	x	x	43.87	x	51.63	x	51.63	
	Salome Mugabe	Mozambique							DNS	

=== Hammer throw ===
Final – 1 August 17:10h – Temperature: 24.1–21.4 °C – Humidity: 42 – 52%

Rank	Name	Nationality	#1	#2	#3	#4	#5	#6	Result	Notes
1st place, gold medalist(s)	Jennifer Dahlgren	Argentina	x	x	x	62.59	63.85	66.84	66.84	
2nd place, silver medalist(s)	Eli Moreno	Colombia	62.86	66.01	x	63.95	64.22	63.95	66.01	
3rd place, bronze medalist(s)	Zuleima Mina	Ecuador	61.97	62.05	61.25	62.84	62.33	x	62.84	
4	Valeria Chiliquinga	Ecuador	58.48	56.93	62.57	60.93	61.20	59.76	62.57	PB
5	Carla Michel	Brazil	59.27	x	x	54.55	59.64	x	59.64	
6	Mariana Marcelino	Brazil	x	x	58.10	57.54	56.19	57.55	58.10	
7	Odette Palma	Chile	57.70	x	x	58.05	57.47	55.20	58.05	
8	Paola Miranda	Paraguay	53.65	54.35	56.75	55.29	54.04	55.44	56.75	

=== Javelin throw ===
Final – 3 August 15:00h – Temperature: 29.2–31.1 °C – Humidity: 20 – 20%

Rank	Name	Nationality	#1	#2	#3	#4	#5	#6	Result	Notes
1st place, gold medalist(s)	Jucilene de Lima	Brazil	56.78	59.04	61.71	58.65	59.12	x	61.71	
2nd place, silver medalist(s)	Laila Ferrer e Silva	Brazil	53.90	58.12	56.07	54.85	55.77	57.62	58.12	
3rd place, bronze medalist(s)	Flor Ruiz	Colombia	56.40	x	x	57.31	x	x	57.31	
4	Coraly Ortiz	Puerto Rico	51.40	x	52.63	53.68	x	53.33	53.68	
5	Lidia Parada	Spain	x	52.07	50.97	x	x	50.47	52.07	
6	María Mello	Uruguay	x	x	x	42.22	43.83	x	43.83	
	Salome Mugabe	Mozambique							DNS	

=== Heptathlon ===
Final

The highest mark recorded in each event is highlighted in yellow

Rank	Name	Nationality	100m H	HJ	SP	200m	LJ	JT	800m	Points	Notes
1st place, gold medalist(s)	Vanessa Spinola	Brazil	14.58 (+0.5); 898	1.72 879	12.85 717	24.77 (-0.9); 908	5.54 (0.6); 712	42.20 710	2:14.63 898	5722	
2nd place, silver medalist(s)	Alysbeth Felix	Puerto Rico	14.04 (+0.1); 973	1.78 953	9.98 528	24.66 (-0.9); 918	6.24 (1.0); 924	30.24 481	2:21.65 801	5578	NR
3rd place, bronze medalist(s)	Lecabela Quaresma	Portugal	13.96 (+0.5); 984	1.63 771	12.57 699	25.33 (-0.9); 857	5.98 (1.0); 843	33.09 535	2:15.58 885	5574	
4	Laura Ginés	Spain	14.41 (+0.5); 921	1.75 916	13.76 778	25.02 (-0.9); 885	5.42 (0.4); 677	40.16 670	2:28.76 709	5556	
5	Evelis Aguilar	Colombia	14.82 (+0.5); 866	1.63 771	12.30 681	24.51 (-1.0); 932	5.52 (0.4); 706	39.22 652	2:13.77 910	5518	
6	Agustina Zerboni	Argentina	13.69 (+0.1); 1023	1.57 701	13.51 761	25.19 (-0.9); 869	5.08 (0.2); 581	41.73 701	2:20.61 815	5451	
7	Estefania Fortes	Spain	13.98 (+0.1); 981	1.57 701	13.15 737	25.43 (-1.0); 848	5.49 (0.1); 697	42.41 714	DNF 0	4678	
8	Ana Laura Leite	Uruguay	15.89 (+0.1); 728	1.54 666	9.51 497	26.93 (-1.0); 718	5.46 (0.0); 688	31.17 499	2:26.75 734	4530	
	Carolina Castillo	Chile	14.25 (+0.5); 943	1.60 736	11.54 631	26.14 (-1.0); 785	5.76 (0.2); 777	DNS 0		DNF	
	Anna Camila Pirelli	Paraguay	DNF (+0.1); 0	DNS 0	–	–	–	–	–	DNF	
	Tamara Alexandrino de Sousa	Brazil	DNS 0	– 0	–	–	–	–	–	DNS	

=== 10,000 meters walk ===
Final – 1 August 18:45h – Temperature: 23.0 °C – Humidity: 35%

Rank	Name	Nationality	Time	Notes
1st place, gold medalist(s)	Júlia Takács	Spain	43:10.95	CR
2nd place, silver medalist(s)	Érica de Sena	Brazil	43:41.30	AR, NR
3rd place, bronze medalist(s)	Kimberly García	Peru	43:57.44	PB
4	Susana Feitor	Portugal	44:15.45	
5	Sandra Arenas	Colombia	44:58.26	NU23R
6	Ingrid Hernández	Colombia	45:25.06	PB
7	Cisiane Lopes	Brazil	46:23.22	PB
8	Ainhoa Pinedo	Spain	46:46.97	
9	Cristina López	El Salvador	47:54.88	
10	Ángela Castro	Bolivia	48:58.35	
	Bibiana Pérez	Ecuador	DQ	230.1

=== 4 × 100 meters relay ===
Final – 3 August 16:30h – Temperature: 26.9 °C – Humidity: 24%

Rank	Nation	Competitors	Time	Notes
1st place, gold medalist(s)	Brazil	Vanusa dos Santos; Ana Cláudia Lemos Silva; Franciela Krasucki Davide; Rosângela Santos	42.92	CR
2nd place, silver medalist(s)	Dominican Republic	LaVonne Idlette; Fany Chalas; Margarita Manzueta; Hiyadilis Melo	46.58	
	Peru	Miriam Reyes; Maitte Torres; Paola Mautino; Diana Bazalar	DQ	170.7

=== 4 × 400 meters relay ===
Final – 3 August 10:50h – Temperature: 25.2 °C – Humidity: 47%

Rank	Nation	Competitors	Time	Notes
1st place, gold medalist(s)	Brazil	Geisa Coutinho; Bárbara de Oliveira; Joelma Sousa; Jailma de Lima	3:29.66	
