= Winder Cuevas =

Personal information
- Full name: Winder Bolivar Cuevas Pérez
- Born: 1 August 1988 (age 37) Oviedo, Dominican Republic
- Height: 1.70 m (5 ft 7 in)
- Weight: 65 kg (143 lb)

Sport
- Country: Dominican Republic
- Sport: Athletics
- Event: 400m Hurdles
- Updated on 21 December 2014

Winder Bolivar Cuevas Pérez (born 1 August 1988) is a Dominican Republic hurdler. At the 2012 Summer Olympics, he competed in the Men's 400 metres hurdles.

== Personal bests ==
- 200 m: 21.25 s (wind: +0.4 m/s) – Cali, Colombia, 23 June 2013
- 400 m: 46.84 s – Mayagüez, Puerto Rico, 8 October 2011
- 400 m hurdles: 49.20 s A – Guadalajara, Mexico, 27 October 2011

== Competition record ==
Year	Competition	Venue	Position	Event	Notes
Representing Dominican Republic
2009	Central American and Caribbean Championships	Havana, Cuba	12th (h)	400 m hurdles	52.78
2010	NACAC U23 Championships	Miramar, United States	2nd	400m hurdles	50.13
2010	NACAC U23 Championships	Miramar, United States	—	4 × 100 m relay	DNF
2010	Central American and Caribbean Games	Mayagüez, Puerto Rico	7th	400 m hurdles	51.49
2010	Central American and Caribbean Games	Mayagüez, Puerto Rico	6th	4 × 100 m relay	39.42
2010	Central American and Caribbean Games	Mayagüez, Puerto Rico	4th	4 × 400 m relay	3:04.68
2011	Central American and Caribbean Championships	Mayagüez, Puerto Rico	7th	400 m hurdles	50.81
2011	Pan American Games	Guadalajara, Mexico	4th	400 m hurdles	49.20
2012	Ibero-American Championships	Barquisimeto, Venezuela	4th	400 m hurdles	50.16
2012	Ibero-American Championships	Barquisimeto, Venezuela	3rd	4 × 400 m relay	3:03.02
2012	Olympic Games	London, United Kingdom	29th (h)	400 m hurdles	50.15
2013	Central American and Caribbean Championships	Morelia, Mexico	8th	400 m hurdles	51.38
2014	Ibero-American Championships	São Paulo, Brazil	6th	400 m hurdles	50.65
2014	Ibero-American Championships	São Paulo, Brazil	1st	4 × 400 m relay	3:02.73
2014	Central American and Caribbean Games	Xalapa, Mexico	7th	400m hurdles	51.20 A
2015	IAAF World Relays	Nassau, Bahamas	23rd (h)	4 × 400 m relay	3:12.55
