= Dennis Bain =

Bahamian sprinter and hurdler

Personal information
- Born: December 15, 1990 (age 35) Freeport, Bahamas
Medal record
Athletics
Representing Bahamas
CARIFTA Games Junior (U20)
Silver medal – second place	2009 Vieux Fort	110 m hurdles

Dennis Bain (born 15 December 1990) is a Bahamian sprinter and hurdler from Freeport, Bahamas who competed in the 100m 200m and 110m Hurdles. He attended Jack Hayward High School in Freeport, Bahamas, before going on to compete for Abilene Christian Wildcats and later Claflin University.

Bain competed at the 2010 NACAC Under-23 Championships in Athletics in Miramar, Florida, and 2012 NACAC Under-23 Championships in Athletics in Mexico. Bain also got a silver medal at the 2009 CARIFTA Games.

== Personal bests ==
Event	Time	Venue	Date
100 m	10.53 (+1.9)	Rock Hill, South Carolina	25 APR 2014
200 m	21.30 (+0.9)	Greensboro, North Carolina	12 APR 2014
110 m hurdles	13.80 (0.0)	Pueblo, Colorado	25 MAY 2012
4 × 100 m relay	40.08	Pueblo, Colorado	24 MAY 2012
