= Athletics at the 2011 Pan American Games – Men's 400 metres hurdles =

Men's 400 metres hurdles at the 2011 Pan American Games
- Venue: Telmex Athletics Stadium
- Dates: October 26 – October 27
- Competitors: 19 from 15 nations

Medalists
Gold medal	Omar Cisneros	Cuba
Silver medal	Isa Phillips	Jamaica
Bronze medal	Felix Sanchez	Dominican Republic

The men's 400 metres hurdles sprint competition of the athletics events at the 2011 Pan American Games took place between the 26 and 27 of October at the Telmex Athletics Stadium. The defending Pan American Games champion was Adam Kunkel of Canada.

== Records ==
Prior to this competition, the existing world and Pan American Games records were as follows:

World record	Kevin Young (USA)	46.76	Barcelona, Spain	August 6, 1992
Pan American Games record	Felix Sanchez (DOM)	48.19	Santo Domingo, Dominican Republic	August 6, 2003

== Qualification ==
Each National Olympic Committee (NOC) was able to enter one athlete regardless if they had met the qualification standard. To enter two entrants both athletes had to have met the minimum standard (52.0) in the qualifying period (January 1, 2010 to September 14, 2011).

== Schedule ==
Date	Time	Round
October 26, 2011	15:35	Semifinals
October 27, 2011	18:05	Final

== Results ==
All times shown are in seconds.

KEY:	q	Fastest non-qualifiers	Q	Qualified	NR	National record	PB	Personal best	SB	Seasonal best	DQ	Disqualified

=== Semifinals ===
Held on October 26. The first two in each heat and the next two fastest advanced to the final.

Rank	Heat	Name	Nationality	Time	Notes
1	3	Omar Cisneros	Cuba	48.99	Q, SB
2	1	Isa Phillips	Jamaica	49.62	Q
3	1	Emanuel Mayers	Trinidad and Tobago	49.86	Q, PB
4	3	Winder Cuevas	Dominican Republic	50.12	Q, PB
5	2	Mahau Suguimati	Brazil	50.20	Q
6	2	Felix Sanchez	Dominican Republic	50.22	Q
7	1	Lee Moore	United States	50.58	q
8	2	Reuben McCoy	United States	50.60	q
9	1	Juan Stenner	Mexico	50.87	PB
10	2	Eric Alejandro	Puerto Rico	51.28	
11	2	Amaurys Valle	Cuba	51.29	
12	3	Victor Solarte	Venezuela	51.31	
13	2	Jose Ceballos	Mexico	51.33	PB
14	1	Alie Beauvais	Haiti	51.67	
15	3	Kenneth Medwood	Belize	51.90	
16	3	Junior Hines	Cayman Islands	52.36	
17	1	Emerson Chala	Ecuador	53.53	
	1	Allan Ayala	Guatemala	DNF	
	3	Andrés Silva	Uruguay	DNF	

=== Final ===
Held on October 27.

Rank	Name	Nationality	Time	Notes
1st place, gold medalist(s)	Omar Cisneros	Cuba	47.99	PR, NR
2nd place, silver medalist(s)	Isa Phillips	Jamaica	48.82	
3rd place, bronze medalist(s)	Felix Sanchez	Dominican Republic	48.85	
4	Winder Cuevas	Dominican Republic	49.20	PB
5	Mahau Suguimati	Brazil	49.61	
6	Emanuel Mayers	Trinidad and Tobago	50.00	
7	Reuben McCoy	United States	50.18	
8	Lee Moore	United States	51.10	
