= Jonathan Davis (sprinter) =

Bahamian sprinter (born 1988)

Personal information
- Born: March 20, 1988 (age 38) Eleuthera, Bahamas
Medal record
Athletics
CARIFTA Games (Youth)
Silver medal – second place	2004 Hamilton	long jump
Silver medal – second place	2004 Hamilton	4×100 m relay

Jonathan Davis (born 20 March 1988) is a Bahamian sprinter from Eleuthera Bahamas who competed in the 100m and 200 and long jump. He attended Tabernacle Baptist Academy in Freeport, Bahamas, before going on to compete for Hinds Community College.

Davis competed at the 2008 NACAC Under-23 Championships in Athletics and the 2010 NACAC Under-23 Championships in Athletics. Davis also competed at the 2007 Pan American Junior Athletics Championships. the 2004 CARIFTA Games and 2006 CARIFTA Games.

== Personal bests ==
Event	Time	Venue	Date
100 m	10.29 (0.0)	Mobile, Alabama	14 APR 2007
200 m	21.13 (-0.4)	Levelland, Texas	16 MAY 2008
400 m	47.82	Baton Rouge, Louisiana	19 APR 2008
