= Stephanie Garcia =

American runner (born 1988)

Personal information
- Nationality: American
- Born: May 3, 1988 (age 38) Austin, Texas, United States
- Height: 5 ft 6 in (1.68 m)

Sport
- Country: United States
- Sport: Track
- Event: 3000 metres steeplechase 1500 meters
- College team: Virginia Cavaliers
- Team: Furman University New Balance
- Turned pro: 2011
- Coached by: Robert Gary
Medal record
Women's athletics
Representing the United States
NACAC U23 Championships
Silver medal – second place	2010 Miramar	3000 m steeplechase

Stephanie Garcia (born May 3, 1988) is an American runner competing primarily in the 3000 metres steeplechase. She represented her country at the 2011 and 2015 World Championships reaching the final on the second occasion.

== Competition record ==
Year	Competition	Venue	Position	Event	Notes
Representing the United States
2010	NACAC U23 Championships	Miramar, United States	2nd	3000 m s'chase	10:20:50
2011	World Championships	Daegu, South Korea	18th (h)	3000 m s'chase	9:53.47
2015	World Championships	Beijing, China	9th	3000 m s'chase	9:31.06

== Personal bests ==
Outdoor

- 1500 metres – 4:05.39 (Greenville 2015)
- One mile – 4:28.84 (Raleigh 2015)
- 3000 metres – 8:58.09 (Ponce 2014)
- 5000 metres – 15:16.56 (Stanford 2016)
- 3000 metres steeplechase – 9:19.48 (Paris 2016)

Indoor

- 1500 metres – 4:09.97 (New York 2016)
- One mile – 4:28.47 (Winston-Salem 2016)
- 3000 metres – 8:53.20 (Glasgow 2016)
