= Eric Alejandro =

Puerto Rican Olympic hurdler (born 1986)

Personal information
- Full name: Eric Javier Alejandro
- Nationality: Puerto Rico
- Born: 15 April 1986 (age 40) Burlington, New Jersey, U.S.
- Education: Eastern Michigan University
- Weight: 183 lb (83 kg)

Sport
- Country: Puerto Rico
- Sport: Track and field
- Event: 400 meters hurdles
- University team: Eastern Michigan Eagles
- Coached by: Brad Fairchild

Achievements and titles
- Personal best: 400 m hurdles: 49.15 (2012)
Medal record
Men's athletics
Representing Puerto Rico
Central American and Caribbean Games
Silver medal – second place	2014 Veracruz	400 m hurdles
- Updated on 14 August 2016

Eric Javier Alejandro (born 15 April 1986) is a Puerto Rican athlete competing mostly in the 400 meters hurdles. He was born in Burlington, New Jersey, United States. An alumnus of Eastern Michigan University, he represented Puerto Rico in the men's 400 meters hurdles in the 2012 Summer Olympics.

== Personal bests ==
=== Outdoor ===
- 400 m: 47.75 s – Tampa, United States, 14 March 2014
- 110 m hurdles: 14.13 s (wind: 0.0 m/s) – Oxford, United States, 12 May 2007
- 400 m hurdles: 49.07 s – São Paulo, Brazil, 2 August 2014

=== Indoor ===
- 60 m: 6.99 s – Ypsilanti, United States, 12 January 2008
- 200 m: 22.21 s – Ann Arbor, United States, 17 February 2007
- 400 m: 47.56 s – Allendale, United States, 21 February 2014
- 60 m hurdles: 7.41 s – Ypsilanti, United States, 1 March 2008

== Competition record ==
Year	Competition	Venue	Position	Event	Notes
Representing Puerto Rico
2011	Central American and Caribbean Championships	Mayagüez, Puerto Rico	7th	4 × 400 m relay	3:05.76
2011	Pan American Games	Guadalajara, Mexico	10th (h)	400 m hurdles	51.28
2012	Ibero-American Championships	Barquisimeto, Venezuela	1st	400 m hurdles	49.36
2012	Olympic Games	London, United Kingdom	12th (sf)	400 m hurdles	49.15
2013	Central American and Caribbean Championships	Morelia, Mexico	5th	400 m hurdles	50.62
2013	Central American and Caribbean Championships	Morelia, Mexico	8th	4 × 400 m relay	3:12.15
2013	World Championships	Moscow, Russia	17th (sf)	400 m hurdles	49.44
2014	Ibero-American Championships	São Paulo, Brazil	2nd	400 m hurdles	49.07
2014	Central American and Caribbean Games	Xalapa, Mexico	2nd	400m hurdles	50.05 A
2015	Pan American Games	Toronto, Canada	12th (sf)	400 m hurdles	51.32
2015	World Championships	Beijing, China	32nd (h)	400 m hurdles	49.94
2016	Ibero-American Championships	Rio de Janeiro, Brazil	7th	400 m hurdles	49.94
2016	Olympic Games	Rio de Janeiro, Brazil	23rd (sf)	400 m hurdles	49.95
