= Anna Jelmini =

American athlete (born 1990)

Personal information
- Born: Anastasia Jelmini; July 15, 1990 (age 35) Bakersfield, California
- Height: 1.77 m (5 ft 9 1/2 in)

Sport
- Sport: Discus and Shot Put
- Club: World Athletic Center

Achievements and titles
- Personal best(s): Discus: 199 ft 6 in (60.80 m); Shot Put: 57 ft 10 in (17.63 m)

Anna Jelmini is an American female track and field athlete. On May 13, 2009 she set the US high school record in the discus throw with a toss of 190 feet 3 inches, breaking the existing record by US Olympian Suzy Powell set in 1994 and subsequently tied by Jelmini on April 24, 2009. On the same day she threw the shot put 54 feet 4-3/4 inches, the second longest toss in US high school history behind US Olympian Michelle Carter's 54 feet 10-3/4 inches, from 2003. Jelmini graduated from Shafter High School in Shafter, California in 2009 and attended Arizona State University. Due to these record breaking performances, at the end of the 2009 season she was named Gatorade's National Track and Field Female Athlete of the Year and Track and Field News "High School Athlete of the Year." Anna Jelmini also received the key to the city in 2009.

After four years at Arizona State University she won the 2013 NCAA Women's Outdoor Track and Field Championship. Anna Jelmini on the global stage earned two NACAC U23 championship discus titles (2010, 2012), one NACAC U23 Championship shot put silver medal and one World Junior Championships finalist.

== High School Personal Bests ==
Event	Mark	Date	All-time U.S. HS Rank
Discus	190 ft 3 in (57.99 m )	May 13, 2009	1
Shot Put	54 ft 4.75 in (16.58 m)	May 13, 2009	2
