= Cordero Bonamy =

Bahamian sprinter

Personal information
- Born: 13 September 1988 (age 37) Nassau, Bahamas

Cordero Bonamy (born 13 September 1988) is a Bahamian sprinter from Nassau, Bahamas who competed in the 100m and 200. He attended St. Johns College High School in Nassau, before going on to compete for Dickinson State University. He then went on to The University of the West Indies Mona in Jamaica to study Physical Therapy.

Bonamy competed at the 2010 NACAC Under-23 Championships in Athletics in Miramar, Florida.

== Personal bests ==
Event	Time	Venue	Date
100 m	10.69 (0.0)	Dickinson, North Dakota	13 MAY 2010
200 m	22.03 (0.0)	Spearfish, South Dakota	28 APR 2011
4 × 100 m relay	40.30	Marion, Indiana	28 MAY 2010
