= T'erea Brown =

American hurdler (born 1989)

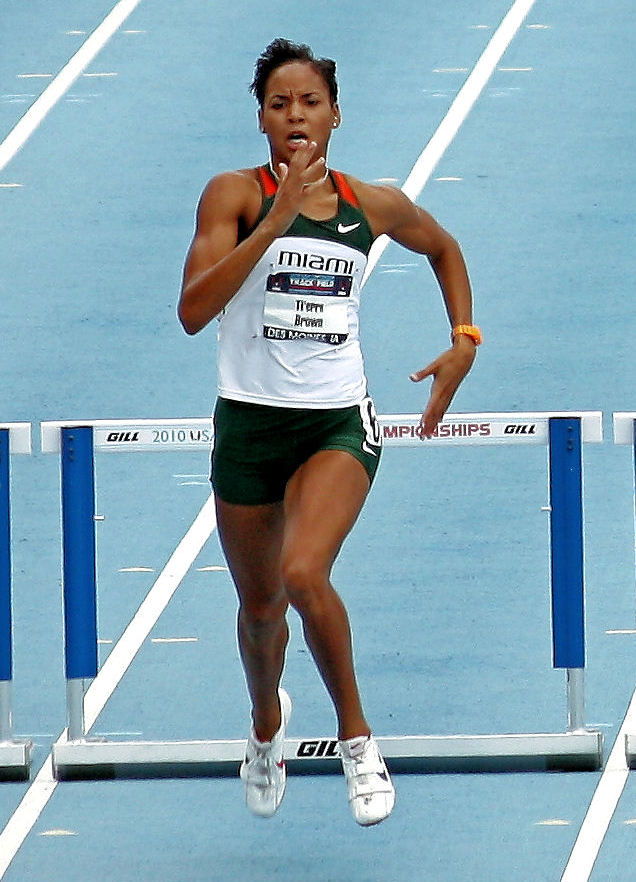
- T'erea Brown during the 2010 USA Outdoor Track and Field Championships

Personal information
- Born: October 24, 1989 (age 36) Charleston, South Carolina, U.S.
- Height: 1.75 m (5 ft 9 in)
- Weight: 64 kg (141 lb)

Sport
- Country: United States
- Sport: Athletics
- Events: 400m Hurdles; 100m Hurdles
Medal record
NACAC Under-23 Championships in Athletics
| Gold medal – first place | 2010 Miramar | 100 metre hurdles |
| Gold medal – first place | 2010 Miramar | 400 metre hurdles |

T'erea Brown (born October 24, 1989) is an American track and field athlete, specializing in hurdling events. She was the 2010 American champion in the 400-meter hurdles and the 2011 NCAA Outdoor champion in the event.

As a youth she ran for Hampton High School in Hampton, Virginia, where she was a three time Virginia State Champion in the 300-meter hurdles and set the state record in the 100-meter hurdles at 13.67 seconds. Her 300 m hurdles time of 41.62 was the second fastest in the nation that year. She moved on to attend the University of Miami and began to represent the school in collegiate competition with the Miami Hurricanes.

Brown reached her first NCAA final in the 400-meter hurdles in 2008, finishing in eighth place. She followed this with a runner-up finish in the event at the 2009 NCAA Outdoors and was a semi-finalist at that year's national championships. She made her breakthrough in 2010: she scored a 60-meter hurdles best of 8.00 seconds at the NCAA Indoor Championships, going on to take third place, then improved her 400 m hurdles best to 54.74 seconds at the NCAA Regionals outdoors. She doubled up in her hurdling at the NCAA Women's Outdoor Track and Field Championships and placed second in both the 100 m and 400 m hurdles events, setting a personal record of 12.84 seconds in the final at the shorter distance. She was the 2010 USA National Champion in the 400 m hurdles, becoming the first University of Miami alumna to do so. After the championships she secured a hurdles gold medal double at the 2010 NACAC Under-23 Championships in Athletics, held in Florida. At the end of her senior year, she was named the South Region Track Performer of the Year by the U.S. Track and Field and Cross Country Coaches Association (USTFCCCA).

In 2011, she again competed in both hurdles events at the NCAA Outdoor Championships and although she was eighth in the 100 m hurdles, she won her first collegiate title in her favoured 400 m event, taking the crown in 55.65 seconds. Brown focused more exclusively on the 400 m hurdles for the 2012 season and was rewarded with a win in 54.85 seconds at the Adidas Grand Prix in New York (her first victory on the Diamond League circuit).

Brown punched her ticket for the 2012 London Olympic Games after running through the line in the time of 54.81 seconds during the US Olympic trials. She reached the final of the 2012 Olympics, finishing in 6th place, after setting a personal best in the semifinal.

== Personal bests ==
- 100 m hurdles - 12.84 sec (Eugene, Oregon, 12 June 2010)
- 400 m hurdles - 54.21 sec (London, United Kingdom, 6 August 2012)
