= Ebony Collins =

American sprinter (born 1989)

Personal information
- Nationality: American
- Born: March 11, 1989 (age 37) Long Beach, California

Sport
- Sport: Running
- Event: Sprints

Achievements and titles
- Personal best(s): 100m: 11.44 (Marrakesh 2005); 200m: 23.42 (Greensboro 2005); 400m: 52.03 (Walnut 2010)
Medal record
Women's athletics
Representing the United States
NACAC Under-23 Championships
Gold medal – first place	2010 Miramar	4×400 m relay
Silver medal – second place	2010 Miramar	400 m
World Youth Championships
Gold medal – first place	2005 Marrakesh	Medley relay
Silver medal – second place	2005 Marrakesh	100 m

Ebony Collins (born March 11, 1989) is an American sprinter who specializes in the 400 metres and 400 metres hurdles.

After a successful track season in 2005, Collins was named USA Track & Field Youth Athlete of the Year. She holds USA Track and Field age group records in the 4 × 100 metres relay and 400 metres hurdles.

Collins attended Woodrow Wilson Classical High School in Long Beach, California. In 2005, she won four gold medals and ran national bests in three events at the CIF California state track and field championships in Sacramento.

Collins was a multiple time college All-American. Running for West Los Angeles College, she earned a Western State Conference and Southern California community college championship record 400m hurdles record in 57.67

Awards
Preceded by LaShawn Merritt	USA Track & Field Youth Athlete of the Year; 2005	Succeeded by Gabby Mayo
