= Lakewood (CDP), New Jersey =

Populated place in Ocean County, New Jersey, US

Lakewood, New Jersey
- Census-designated place
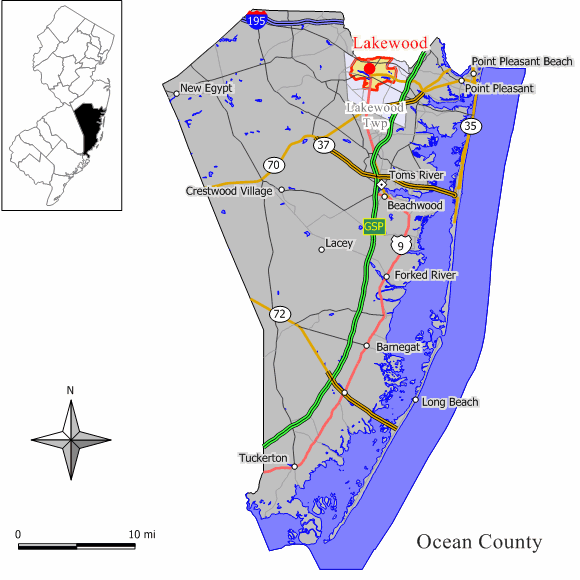
- Map of Lakewood CDP in Ocean County. Inset: Location of Ocean County in New Jersey.

- Location in Ocean County Location in New Jersey Location in the United States
- Coordinates: 40.093975°N 74.211478°W
- Country: United States
- State: New Jersey
- County: Ocean
- Township: Lakewood

Area
  - Total: 7.32 sq mi (18.97 km^{2})
  - Land: 7.08 sq mi (18.34 km^{2})
  - Water: 0.24 sq mi (0.63 km^{2}) 3.35%
- Elevation: 66 ft (20 m)

Population (2020)
  - Total: 69,398
  - Density: 9,803.4/sq mi (3,785.1/km^{2})
- Time zone: UTC−05:00 (Eastern (EST))
  - Summer (DST): UTC−04:00 (Eastern (EDT))
- ZIP Code: 08701
- Area codes: 732/848, 908
- FIPS code: 34-38580
- GNIS feature ID: 02390031

Lakewood is an unincorporated community and census-designated place (CDP) located within Lakewood Township, in Ocean County, in the U.S. state of New Jersey. As of the 2010 United States census, the CDP's population was 53,805.

== Geography ==
According to the United States Census Bureau, the CDP had a total area of 7.323 square miles (18.97 km^{2}), including 7.078 square miles (18.33 km^{2}) of land and 0.245 square miles (0.63 km^{2}) of water (3.35%).

== Demographics ==
Historical population
Census	Pop.	Note	%±
1950	9,970		—
1960	13,004		30.4%
1970	17,874		37.5%
1980	22,863		27.9%
1990	26,095		14.1%
2000	36,065		38.2%
2010	53,805		49.2%
2020	69,398		29.0%
Population sources: 1950; 1960-1970 1960-1980; 1990-2010 2000; 2010 2020

Lakewood was listed as an unincorporated community in the 1950 U.S. census; and then as a census designated place in the 1980 U.S. census.

=== 2020 census ===
Lakewood CDP, New Jersey – Racial and ethnic composition Note: the US Census treats Hispanic/Latino as an ethnic category. This table excludes Latinos from the racial categories and assigns them to a separate category. Hispanics/Latinos may be of any race.
Race / Ethnicity (NH = Non-Hispanic)	Pop 2000	Pop 2010	Pop 2020	% 2000	% 2010	% 2020
White alone (NH)	24,625	41,438	58,001	68.28%	77.02%	83.58%
Black or African American alone (NH)	4,181	2,262	1,197	11.59%	4.20%	1.72%
Native American or Alaska Native alone (NH)	21	21	46	0.06%	0.04%	0.07%
Asian alone (NH)	328	249	176	0.91%	0.46%	0.25%
Native Hawaiian or Pacific Islander alone (NH)	2	6	1	0.01%	0.01%	0.00%
Other race alone (NH)	75	63	1,112	0.21%	0.12%	1.60%
Mixed race or Multiracial (NH)	452	220	943	1.25%	0.41%	1.36%
Hispanic or Latino (any race)	6,381	9,546	7,922	17.69%	17.74%	11.42%
Total	36,065	53,805	69,398	100.00%	100.00%	100.00%

=== 2010 census ===
The 2010 United States census counted 53,805 people, 10,592 households, and 8,918 families in the CDP. The population density was 7,601.8 people per square mile (2,935.1 people/km^{2}). There were 11,226 housing units at an average density of 1,586.1 units per square mile (612.4 units/km^{2}). The racial makeup was 85.79% (46,160) White, 4.75% (2,556) Black or African American, 0.28% (149) Native American, 0.50% (270) Asian, 0.03% (14) Pacific Islander, 7.41% (3,986) from other races, and 1.25% (670) from two or more races. Hispanic or Latino of any race were 17.74% (9,546) of the population.

Of the 10,592 households, 62.7% had children under the age of 18; 70.5% were married couples living together; 9.3% had a female householder with no husband present and 15.8% were non-families. Of all households, 12.6% were made up of individuals and 6.5% had someone living alone who was 65 years of age or older. The average household size was 4.89 and the average family size was 5.23.

48.4% of the population were under the age of 18, 12.7% from 18 to 24, 25.4% from 25 to 44, 9.1% from 45 to 64, and 4.3% who were 65 years of age or older. The median age was 19.1 years. For every 100 females, the population had 106.8 males. For every 100 females ages 18 and older there were 107.2 males.

=== 2000 census ===
As of the 2000 United States census, there were 36,065 people, 8,984 households, and 6,971 families living in the CDP. The population density was 1,944.8 people/km^{2} (5,037 people/mi^{2}). There were 9,496 housing units at an average density of 512.1 units/km^{2} (1,326 units/mi^{2}). The racial make-up of the CDP was 77.64% White, 12.24% African American, 0.20% Native American, 0.96% Asian, 0.04% Pacific Islander, 5.55% from other races, and 3.37% from two or more races. Hispanic or Latino of any race were 17.69% of the population.

There were 8,984 households, out of which 49.7% had children under the age of 18 living with them, 60.3% were married couples living together, 13.0% had a female householder with no husband present, and 22.4% were non-families. 18.2% of all households were made up of individuals, and 10.1% had someone living alone who was 65 years of age or older. The average household size was 3.83 and the average family size was 4.36.

In the CDP, the population was spread out, with 41.4% under the age of 18, 13.0% from 18 to 24, 25.7% from 25 to 44, 11.7% from 45 to 64, and 8.3% who were 65 years of age or older. The median age was 23 years. For every 100 females, there were 101.6 males. For every 100 females age 18 and over, there were 99.7 males.

The median income for a household in the CDP was $30,769, and the median income for a family was $32,748. Males had a median income of $35,672, versus $24,265 for females. The per capita income for the CDP was $11,802. About 26.4% of families and 29.1% of the population were below the poverty line, including 34.0% of those under age 18, and 18.5% of those age 65 or over.
