= Ahmed Osman (runner) =

American long-distance runner

Personal information
- Born: January 1, 1988 (age 38)

Sport
- Country: United States
- Sport: Long-distance running

Ahmed Osman (born January 1, 1988) is an American long-distance runner. In 2019, he competed in the men's marathon at the 2019 World Athletics Championships held in Doha, Qatar. He finished in 23rd place.

In 2019, he also competed in the London Marathon held in London, United Kingdom. He did not finish his race. His P.R. for the marathon is 2:14:40, achieved in the 2018 Chicago Marathon.
