= Chris Cralle =

American hammer thrower

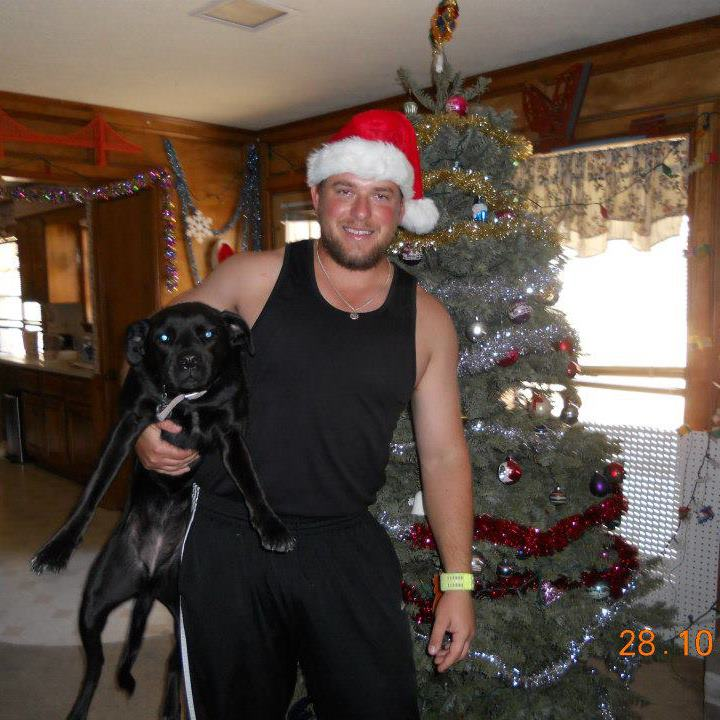

Personal information
- Born: Christopher James Cralle; June 13, 1988 (age 38) College Station, Texas, United States
- Education: Sam Houston State University
Medal record
Men's Athletics
Representing the United States
Southland Conference
Silver medal – second place	2007	Hammer throw
Gold medal – first place	2008	Hammer throw
Gold medal – first place	2009	Hammer throw
Gold medal – first place	2011	Hammer throw
NACAC Under-23 Championships in Athletics
Gold medal – first place	2010	Hammer Throw
United States Olympic Trials
Silver medal – second place	2012	Hammer throw

Christopher James Cralle (born 15 June 1988 in College Station, Texas) is a competitive USA hammer thrower, who is regarded as the most accomplished Sam Houston State athlete in Hammer Throw of all time.

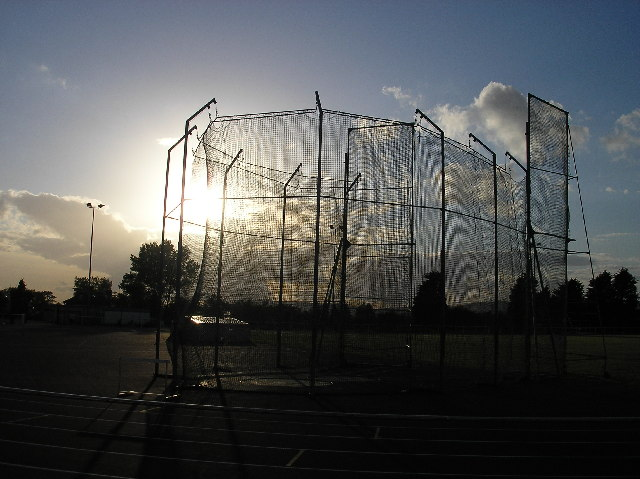
Throwing Cage – geograph.org.uk – 33131

== High school career ==
As an athlete Chris came on a scholarship from A&M Consolidated High School to Sam Houston State University. Cralle was the 2006 Texas 5A state champion in the discus but soon found greater success at the collegiate level in the hammer throw.

== Collegiate career ==
Cralle qualified for the NCAA National Championships in track and field as a Sophomore, Junior and fifth year Senior. Chris's top performance came at the USA track and field championships where he placed 8th with a Personal Record of 71.09

== 2012 Olympic trials ==
While most of Chris Cralle's friends would consider him a mad man for doing the same thing over and over expecting different results, he proved he was not mad. On June 21, 2012, Chris unleashed a massive personal record of 74.36 meters gaining a second-place finish at the 2012 US Olympic Trials. Chris is currently training at Sam Houston State University as a coach and athlete and looks forward to the 2016 Olympic Games.
