= Tara Welling =

American long-distance runner

Tara Welling (née Erdmann) is an American long-distance runner.

In college, she competed for Loyola Marymount University.

She finished 3rd at the 2013 USA Outdoor Track and Field Championships, but did not earn the "A" standard and therefore did not qualify for the World Championships.

In 2016, Welling won the US half marathon championship. That same year, she won the national 15 km championship.

In cross country, she helped her team to a second-place finish at the USATF National Club Cross Country Championships.
