= Charles Jock =

American middle-distance runner (born 1989)

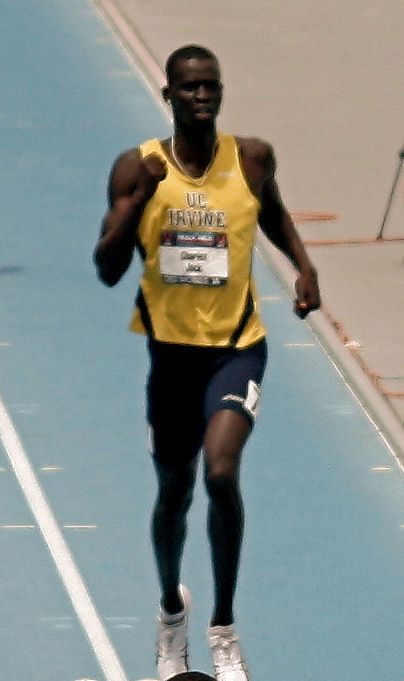
- Jock at the 2010 USATF Championships

Personal information
- Nationality: American
- Born: November 23, 1989 (age 36) Mekelle, Ethiopia
- Height: 6 ft 3 in (191 cm)
- Weight: 164 lb (74 kg)

Sport
- Sport: Track
- Event: 800 meters
- College team: UC Irvine

Achievements and titles
- Personal bests: 400m: 46.30; 800m: 1:44.67
- Updated on August 14, 2016

Charles Jock (born 23 November 1989) is an American middle-distance runner who specializes in the 800 meter discipline. He ran collegiately at UC Irvine. He is currently the NACAC U23 record holder for the 800 meter race. Jock represented the United States at the 2011 World Championships in Athletics.

== Early life ==
Jock was born in a refugee camp in Ethiopia after his parents, John and Mary, escaped the civil war in Sudan. He and his family would eventually reach asylum in the United States and move to San Diego, California. In 2005, his father died of liver cancer.

== Running career ==
=== High school ===
Jock attended Mission Bay High School. He first played basketball for the school, during which coach Emmitt Dodd insisted that Jock try track and field. He first began as a high jumper before being put into an 800-meter race, the distance he would succeed in 2008 he was the California State meet champion in the 800 running a time of 1:51.64. He currently holds both of Mission Bay's 400 and 800 meter records.

=== Collegiate ===
Jock attended University of California, Irvine and was given an athletic scholarship. He majored in Urban Studies and showed an interest in sustainable living. He became a member of Sigma Alpha Epsilon fraternity at UCI. While still in college, Jock qualified to represent the United States at the 2011 World Championships in Athletics, where he ran in the men's 800 meters. A year later, Jock won the men's 800 meters at the 2012 NCAA DI T&F Championships.

=== Post-collegiate ===
Jock qualified for the 2016 Rio Olympics in the 800 meters after a surprise 3rd-place finish in the event in the U.S. Olympic Trials. Jock ran in heat 4 of the men's 800 at the 2016 Summer Olympics, finishing in sixth place with a time of 1:47.06.
