= Heather Steacy =

Canadian hammer thrower

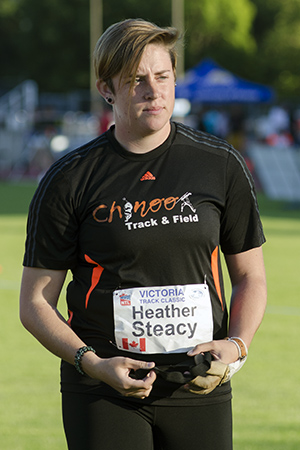

Personal information
- Born: April 14, 1988 (age 38) Saskatoon, Saskatchewan
- Height: 1.75 m (5 ft 9 in)
- Weight: 80 kg (176 lb)

Sport
- Country: Canada
- Sport: Athletics
- Event: Hammer throw

Achievements and titles
- Personal best: 72.16m

Heather Steacy (born April 14, 1988, in Saskatoon, Saskatchewan) is a Canadian track and field athlete competing in the hammer throw. She competed in the hammer throw event at the 2012 Summer Olympics where she finished 34th. She is the younger sister of Canadian Olympic hammer thrower James Steacy.

In July 2016 she was officially named to Canada's Olympic team. She finished in 23rd place.

During the University of Lethbridge's 50th anniversary, Heather Steacy was named #7 Pronghorn of all time, recognizing not only her Olympic success, but also her 2 time win of the prestigious Pronghorn of the Year award.

== Achievements ==
- 1st, 2012 and 2016 National Championships, Calgary, Canada (Olympic "A" Standard).
- 14th, q., 2011 IAAF World Championships in Athletics, Daegu, South Korea.
- Personal Best: 72.16; Tempe, AZ, 4 June 2012
