= La'Sean Pickstock =

Bahamian sprinter (born 1989)

Personal information
- Born: 4 August 1989 (age 37)
Medal record
Athletics
Representing Bahamas
Central American and Caribbean Games
Silver medal – second place	2010 Mayaguez	4 × 400 meters
NACAC U-23 Championships
Silver medal – second place	2010 Miramar	4 × 400 meters

La'Sean Pickstock (born 4 August 1989) is a male sprinter from Nassau, Bahamas, who mainly competed in the 400m. He ran second leg of the 4x400 relay at the 2010 IAAF World Indoor Championships in Athletics in Doha, Qatar and first leg of the 4 × 400 m relay at the 2010 Commonwealth Games that placed fourth in the final. He ran the anchor leg of the 4 × 400 m Relay at the NACAC U23 Championships in Athletics where the Bahamas won the silver medal in the final. He attended CR.Walker High School in the Bahamas before joining countryman and Olympic gold medalist Ramon Miller at Dickinson State University where he was an All American. He now works for the Dickinson Police Department in Dickinson, North Dakota.

== Personal bests ==
Event	Time (seconds)	Venue	Date
200m	21.03 (+1.2)	Miramar, Florida	10 JUL 2010
400m	46.25	Marion, Indiana	29 MAY 2010
400m Indoor	47.78	Birmingham, Alabama	11 FEB 2012
