= 2011 Central American and Caribbean Championships in Athletics – Results =

These are the official results of the 2011 Central American and Caribbean Championships in Athletics which took place on July 15–17, 2011 in Mayagüez, Puerto Rico.

== Men's results ==
=== 100 meters ===
Heats – July 15
Wind:
Heat 1: −0.9 m/s, Heat 2: −1.5 m/s, Heat 3: −1.3 m/s, Heat 4: −1.8 m/s, Heat 5: −1.3 m/s

Rank	Heat	Name	Nationality	Time	Notes
1	1	Keston Bledman	Trinidad and Tobago	10.32	Q
2	1	Kemar Hyman	Cayman Islands	10.40	q
2	3	Dexter Lee	Jamaica	10.40	Q
4	5	Carlos Jorge	Dominican Republic	10.41	Q
5	2	Daniel Bailey	Antigua and Barbuda	10.43	Q
6	4	Oshane Bailey	Jamaica	10.45	Q
7	4	Ramon Gittens	Barbados	10.47	q
7	5	Adrian Griffith	Bahamas	10.47	q
9	2	Aaron Armstrong	Trinidad and Tobago	10.50	
9	5	Miguel López	Puerto Rico	10.50	
11	1	Jonathan Juin	Haiti	10.53	
12	3	Antoine Adams	Saint Kitts and Nevis	10.57	
13	2	Brijesh Lawrence	Saint Kitts and Nevis	10.61	
14	5	Geronimo Goeloe	Aruba	10.68	
15	4	Carlos Rodriguez	Puerto Rico	10.78	
16	5	Juan Sainfleur	Dominican Republic	10.85	
17	2	Vladimir Valencia	Colombia	10.87	
17	3	Roberto Murillo	Colombia	10.87	
19	1	Adrian Durant	United States Virgin Islands	10.88	
20	1	Juan Reyes	Mexico	10.91	
21	4	Roudy Monrose	Haiti	10.92	
22	2	Rachmil Van Lamoen	Curaçao	10.97	
23	4	Jurgen Themen	Suriname	10.99	
24	4	Courtny Bascombe	Saint Vincent and the Grenadines	11.03	
25	3	Quammie Joseph	Antigua and Barbuda	11.04	
25	4	Hensley Paulina	Curaçao	11.04	
27	4	Shernyl Burns	Montserrat	11.11	
28	2	Pablo Jiménez	Mexico	11.20	
29	3	Malick Perugien	Martinique	11.31	
30	2	Amail Samuel	Saint Vincent and the Grenadines	11.39	
	3	Jamial Rolle	Bahamas	DQ	
	5	Harold Houston	Bermuda	DQ	
	5	Lester Ryan	Montserrat	DQ	
	1	Jeffrey Gomez	Aruba	DNS	
	1	David Registe	Dominica	DNS	

Final – July 15
Wind:
−0.5 m/s

Rank	Name	Nationality	Time	Notes
1st place, gold medalist(s)	Keston Bledman	Trinidad and Tobago	10.05	
2nd place, silver medalist(s)	Daniel Bailey	Antigua and Barbuda	10.11	
3rd place, bronze medalist(s)	Dexter Lee	Jamaica	10.18	
4	Oshane Bailey	Jamaica	10.28	
5	Ramon Gittens	Barbados	10.31	
6	Carlos Jorge	Dominican Republic	10.33	
7	Adrian Griffith	Bahamas	10.35	
	Kemar Hyman	Cayman Islands	DQ	

=== 200 meters ===
Heats – July 16
Wind:
Heat 1: +0.9 m/s, Heat 2: +1.1 m/s, Heat 3: +0.7 m/s, Heat 4: +1.5 m/s

Rank	Heat	Name	Nationality	Time	Notes
1	1	Michael Mathieu	Bahamas	20.64	Q
2	4	Demetrius Pinder	Bahamas	20.70	Q
3	4	Jason Young	Jamaica	20.77	q
4	1	Emmanuel Callender	Trinidad and Tobago	20.91	q
5	3	Brijesh Lawrence	Saint Kitts and Nevis	20.94	Q
6	4	Yoel Tapia	Dominican Republic	20.98	q
7	3	Joel Redhead	Grenada	21.01	q
8	4	José Acevedo	Venezuela	21.03	
9	1	Dwight Mullings	Jamaica	21.05	
9	2	Rondel Sorrillo	Trinidad and Tobago	21.05	Q
11	3	Jonathan Juin	Haiti	21.14	
12	3	Andrés Rodríguez	Panama	21.30	
13	1	Arturo Ramírez	Venezuela	21.31	
14	2	Calvin Dascent	United States Virgin Islands	21.33	
15	2	Roudy Monrose	Haiti	21.34	
16	2	Antoine Adams	Saint Kitts and Nevis	21.39	
17	4	Harold Houston	Bermuda	21.47	
18	3	Gustavo Cuesta	Dominican Republic	21.56	
19	4	Richard Richardson	Antigua and Barbuda	21.76	
20	4	Juan Reyes	Mexico	21.85	
21	2	Lester Ryan	Montserrat	21.93	
22	1	Shernyl Burns	Montserrat	22.32	
23	3	Nygell Dumfries	Curaçao	22.65	
24	1	Shakyll Lourens	Aruba	22.76	
25	3	Arthur Lawrence	Saint Vincent and the Grenadines	23.09	
26	4	Quincy Breell	Aruba	23.19	
27	2	Courtney Carl Williams	Saint Vincent and the Grenadines	23.25	
	1	Adrian Durant	United States Virgin Islands	DNS	

Final – July 17
Wind:
+1.1 m/s

Rank	Name	Nationality	Time	Notes
1st place, gold medalist(s)	Michael Mathieu	Bahamas	20.60	
2nd place, silver medalist(s)	Rondel Sorrillo	Trinidad and Tobago	20.64	
3rd place, bronze medalist(s)	Jason Young	Jamaica	20.78	
4	Brijesh Lawrence	Saint Kitts and Nevis	21.03	
5	Emmanuel Callender	Trinidad and Tobago	21.12	
6	Joel Redhead	Grenada	21.23	
	Yoel Tapia	Dominican Republic	DQ	
	Demetrius Pinder	Bahamas	DNS	

=== 400 meters ===
Heats – July 15

Rank	Heat	Name	Nationality	Time	Notes
1	1	Renny Quow	Trinidad and Tobago	46.11	Q
2	1	Erison Hurtault	Dominica	46.20	Q
3	2	Ramon Miller	Bahamas	46.28	Q
4	1	Dawayne Barrett	Jamaica	46.39	q
5	1	Andrae Williams	Bahamas	46.48	q
6	2	Lalonde Gordon	Trinidad and Tobago	46.98	Q
7	2	Takeshi Fujiwara	El Salvador	47.00	
8	3	Luguelín Santos	Dominican Republic	47.07	Q
9	3	Riker Hylton	Jamaica	47.10	Q
10	3	Alberto Aguilar	Venezuela	47.44	
11	2	Calvin Dascent	United States Virgin Islands	47.46	
12	2	Omar Longart	Venezuela	47.61	
13	3	Pascale Orelus	Haiti	47.83	
14	3	Liemarvin Bonevacia	Curaçao	48.04	
15	2	Erik Gomez	Puerto Rico	48.08	
16	1	Kelvin Herrera	Dominican Republic	48.20	
17	1	José Cruz	Puerto Rico	48.34	
18	3	Kerron Toussaint	Grenada	48.90	
19	1	Josh Charles	Grenada	49.30	
20	3	Yurnic Nanton	Saint Vincent and the Grenadines	50.65	
21	2	Wilveron Baptiste	Haiti	51.09	
22	2	Keron Arthur	Saint Vincent and the Grenadines	51.78	
	3	Mitchel Davis	Dominica	DNS	

Final – July 15

Rank	Name	Nationality	Time	Notes
1st place, gold medalist(s)	Renny Quow	Trinidad and Tobago	45.44	
2nd place, silver medalist(s)	Ramon Miller	Bahamas	45.56	
3rd place, bronze medalist(s)	Erison Hurtault	Dominica	45.93	
4	Riker Hylton	Jamaica	46.02	
5	Dawayne Barrett	Jamaica	46.67	
6	Andrae Williams	Bahamas	46.69	
	Lalonde Gordon	Trinidad and Tobago	DNF	
	Luguelín Santos	Dominican Republic	DNF	

=== 800 meters ===
Heats – July 15

Rank	Heat	Name	Nationality	Time	Notes
1	1	Moise Joseph	Haiti	1:48.96	Q
2	2	Edgard Cortez	Nicaragua	1:51.84	Q
3	1	Joel Mejia	Dominican Republic	1:52.00	Q
4	2	Andy González	Cuba	1:52.34	Q
5	2	José Esparza	Mexico	1:52.47	Q
6	1	Jenner Pelico	Guatemala	1:52.89	Q
7	2	Edgardo Martínez	Puerto Rico	1:52.90	q
8	2	Jon Rankin	Cayman Islands	1:52.92	q
9	1	Jesus Preciado	Mexico	1:53.44	
10	2	Wesley Neymour	Bahamas	1:54.07	
11	2	Arnoldo Monge	Costa Rica	1:54.34	
12	1	Seymour Walter	United States Virgin Islands	1:55.49	
13	1	Darico Clarke	Bermuda	1:58.69	
14	1	Alexis Torre-Santiago	Puerto Rico	1:59.54	
	2	Nico Herrera	Venezuela	DNS	

Final – July 16

Rank	Name	Nationality	Time	Notes
1st place, gold medalist(s)	Andy González	Cuba	1:48.15	
2nd place, silver medalist(s)	Moise Joseph	Haiti	1:48.94	
3rd place, bronze medalist(s)	Joel Mejia	Dominican Republic	1:49.67	
4	Edgard Cortez	Nicaragua	1:49.74	
5	José Esparza	Mexico	1:49.86	
6	Edgardo Martínez	Puerto Rico	1:52.62	
7	Jenner Pelico	Guatemala	1:53.04	
	Jon Rankin	Cayman Islands	DNF	

=== 1500 meters ===
July 15

Rank	Name	Nationality	Time	Notes
1st place, gold medalist(s)	Nico Herrera	Venezuela	3:44.92	
2nd place, silver medalist(s)	José Esparza	Mexico	3:45.78	
3rd place, bronze medalist(s)	Jon Rankin	Cayman Islands	3:46.09	NR
4	Samuel Vazquez	Puerto Rico	3:47.75	
5	Luis Orta	Venezuela	3:48.22	
6	Iván Darío González	Colombia	3:48.47	
7	Cleveland Forde	Guyana	3:49.17	
8	Christopher Sandoval	Mexico	3:49.28	
9	Jenner Pelico	Guatemala	3:52.16	
10	Alvaro Abreu	Dominican Republic	3:53.40	
11	Lamont Marshall	Bermuda	3:55.00	
12	Oneil Williams	Bahamas	4:00.69	
13	Harold Lamour	Haiti	4:02.24	
	Seymour Walter	United States Virgin Islands	DNF	

=== 5000 meters ===
July 16

Rank	Name	Nationality	Time	Notes
1st place, gold medalist(s)	José Uribe	Mexico	14:08.10	
2nd place, silver medalist(s)	Luis Orta	Venezuela	14:14.30	
3rd place, bronze medalist(s)	Julio Perez	Mexico	14:22.01	
4	Cleveland Forde	Guyana	14:36.21	
5	Iván Darío González	Colombia	14:36.21	
6	Lamont Marshall	Bermuda	14:53.67	
7	Milton Ayala	Colombia	14:59.92	
8	Jon Rankin	Cayman Islands	15:01.76	
9	Fernando Ojeda	Puerto Rico	15:47.54	
10	Leighton Spencer	Jamaica	15:49.76	

=== 10,000 meters ===
July 15

Rank	Name	Nationality	Time	Notes
1st place, gold medalist(s)	Juan Romero	Mexico	28:54.06	CR
2nd place, silver medalist(s)	Alejandro Suarez	Mexico	29:15.49	
3rd place, bronze medalist(s)	Milton Ayala	Colombia	30:55.71	
4	Denides Velez	Puerto Rico	31:51.79	
	Alfredo Arevalo	Guatemala	DNS	
	José Amado García	Guatemala	DNS	

=== Half marathon ===
July 17

Rank	Name	Nationality	Time	Notes
1st place, gold medalist(s)	Luis Collazo	Puerto Rico	1:07:08	
2nd place, silver medalist(s)	Luis Rivera	Puerto Rico	1:08:38	
3rd place, bronze medalist(s)	Oscar Ceron	Mexico	1:09:17	
4	Cesar Lizano	Costa Rica	1:10:38	
5	Nelson Rodríguez	Puerto Rico	1:11:45	
6	Jorge Castelblanco	Panama	1:14:47	
7	Pamenos Ballantyne	Saint Vincent and the Grenadines	1:17:08	
8	Alfonso Paula	Dominican Republic	1:17:16	
9	Mark Greenidge	Barbados	1:24:56	

=== 110 meters hurdles ===
Heats – July 17
Wind:
Heat 1: −3.9 m/s, Heat 2: −3.5 m/s

Rank	Heat	Name	Nationality	Time	Notes
1	2	Hansle Parchment	Jamaica	13.85	Q
2	1	Paulo Villar	Colombia	13.96	Q
3	1	Eric Keddo	Jamaica	13.99	Q
4	1	Enrique Llanos	Puerto Rico	14.05	Q
5	2	Hector Cotto	Puerto Rico	14.09	Q
6	1	Greggmar Swift	Barbados	14.09	q
7	2	Carlos Jorge	Dominican Republic	14.16	Q
8	2	Shane Brathwaite	Barbados	14.16	q
9	1	Ronald Forbes	Cayman Islands	14.18	
10	1	Jeffrey Julmis	Haiti	14.19	
11	2	Ronald Bennett	Honduras	14.39	
12	1	Estebán Guzmán	Honduras	14.40	
13	2	Rodrigo Casar	Mexico	15.16	
14	2	Jonathan Santiago	Puerto Rico	15.30	

Final – July 17
Wind:
+0.7 m/s

Rank	Name	Nationality	Time	Notes
1st place, gold medalist(s)	Eric Keddo	Jamaica	13.49	
2nd place, silver medalist(s)	Hector Cotto	Puerto Rico	13.54	
3rd place, bronze medalist(s)	Paulo Villar	Colombia	13.60	
4	Shane Brathwaite	Barbados	13.75	
5	Carlos Jorge	Dominican Republic	13.76	
6	Greggmar Swift	Barbados	13.84	
7	Enrique Llanos	Puerto Rico	13.88	
	Hansle Parchment	Jamaica	DQ	

=== 400 meters hurdles ===
Heats – July 15

Rank	Heat	Name	Nationality	Time	Notes
1	3	Leford Green	Jamaica	49.81	Q
2	2	Leslie Murray	United States Virgin Islands	49.95	Q
3	3	Jamele Mason	Puerto Rico	49.96	Q
4	1	Winder Cuevas	Dominican Republic	50.21	Q
5	1	Javier Culson	Puerto Rico	50.22	Q
6	2	Jehue Gordon	Trinidad and Tobago	50.22	Q
7	3	Félix Sánchez	Dominican Republic	50.31	q
8	2	Roxroy Cato	Jamaica	50.76	q
9	1	Kenneth Medwood	Belize	51.29	
10	2	Junior Hines	Cayman Islands	51.65	
11	3	Yeison Rivas	Colombia	51.70	
12	2	Alie Beauvais	Haiti	51.95	
13	3	Kelton Cumberbatch	Guyana	52.55	
14	1	Juan Stenner	Mexico	53.22	
15	1	Pedro Suazo	Honduras	53.74	
16	2	Jeffery Gibson	Bahamas	54.28	
	3	Nathan Arnett	Bahamas	DNF	
	1	Steve Delice	Haiti	DNS	
	1	Amilcar Torres	Colombia	DNS	

Final – July 16

Rank	Name	Nationality	Time	Notes
1st place, gold medalist(s)	Leford Green	Jamaica	49.03	
2nd place, silver medalist(s)	Félix Sánchez	Dominican Republic	49.41	
3rd place, bronze medalist(s)	Jehue Gordon	Trinidad and Tobago	50.10	
4	Javier Culson	Puerto Rico	50.27	
5	Jamele Mason	Puerto Rico	50.28	
6	Roxroy Cato	Jamaica	50.38	
7	Winder Cuevas	Dominican Republic	50.81	
8	Leslie Murray	United States Virgin Islands	51.64	

=== 3000 meters steeplechase ===
July 16

Rank	Name	Nationality	Time	Notes
1st place, gold medalist(s)	Luis Enrique Ibarra	Mexico	8:55.86	
2nd place, silver medalist(s)	Fernando Roman	Puerto Rico	8:58.95	
3rd place, bronze medalist(s)	Aaron Arias	Mexico	9:01.35	
4	Alvaro Abreu	Dominican Republic	9:04.97	
5	Juan Robles	United States Virgin Islands	9:43.19	

=== 4 × 100 meters relay ===
Heats – July 16

Rank	Heat	Nation	Competitors	Time	Notes
1	1	Trinidad and Tobago	Rondel Sorrillo, Darrel Brown, Emmanuel Callender, Aaron Armstrong	39.26	Q
2	1	Bahamas	Jamial Rolle, Adrian Griffith, Demetrius Pinder, Michael Mathieu	39.29	Q
3	2	Saint Kitts and Nevis	Jason Rogers, Kim Collins, Delwayne Delaney, Brijesh Lawrence	39.58	Q
4	1	Jamaica	Oshane Bailey, Dexter Lee, Dwight Mullings, Hansle Parchment	39.74	Q
5	2	Dominican Republic	Emmanuel Brioso, Yoel Tapia, Juan Sainfleur, Carlos Jorge	39.93	Q
6	2	Puerto Rico	Miguel López, Carlos Rodríguez, Sean Holston, Hector Cotto	39.96	Q
7	2	Colombia	Isidro Montoya, Geiner Mosquera, Vladimir Valencia, Daniel Grueso	40.22	q
8	2	Haiti	Dominique Degrammont, Jeffrey Julmis, Josue Louis, Jonathan Juin	40.76	q
9	2	Curaçao	Nygell Dumfries, Liemarvin Bonevacia, Hensley Paulina, Rachmil Van Lamoen	41.49	
10	2	Mexico	Luis Rivera, Juan Reyes, Rodrigo Casar, Juan Stenner	41.98	
11	1	Aruba	Geronimo Goeloe, Jeffrey Gomez, Shakyll Lourens, Quincy Breell	42.35	NR
	1	Saint Vincent and the Grenadines	Amail Samuel, Courtny Bascombe, Courtney Carl Williams, Yurnic Nanton	DQ	
	1	Antigua and Barbuda	Daniel Bailey, Brendan Christian, Richard Richardson, Quammie Joseph	DNS	

Final – July 16

Rank	Nation	Competitors	Time	Notes
1st place, gold medalist(s)	Jamaica	Lerone Clarke, Dexter Lee, Jason Young, Oshane Bailey	38.81	
2nd place, silver medalist(s)	Trinidad and Tobago	Aaron Armstrong, Darrel Brown, Emmanuel Callender, Keston Bledman	38.89	
3rd place, bronze medalist(s)	Saint Kitts and Nevis	Jason Rogers, Kim Collins, Antoine Adams, Brijesh Lawrence	39.07	NR
4	Bahamas	Warren Fraser, Adrian Griffith, Rodney Green, Jamial Rolle	39.46	
5	Puerto Rico	Miguel López, Carlos Rodríguez, Sean Holston, Hector Cotto	39.71	
6	Dominican Republic	Emmanuel Brioso, Yoel Tapia, Juan Sainfleur, Carlos Jorge	40.14	
7	Colombia	Isidro Montoya, Geiner Mosquera, Vladimir Valencia, Roberto Murillo	40.73	
8	Haiti	Dominique Degrammont, Jeffrey Julmis, Josue Louis, Jonathan Juin	40.82	

=== 4 × 400 meters relay ===
July 17

Rank	Nation	Competitors	Time	Notes
1st place, gold medalist(s)	Bahamas	LaToy Williams, Avard Moncur, Michael Mathieu, Ramon Miller	3:01.33	
2nd place, silver medalist(s)	Trinidad and Tobago	Lalonde Gordon, Jarrin Solomon, Deon Lendore, Renny Quow	3:01.65	
3rd place, bronze medalist(s)	Jamaica	Dwight Mullings, Riker Hylton, Dawayne Barrett, Leford Green	3:02.00	
4	Dominican Republic	Arismendy Peguero, Joel Mejia, Yoel Tapia, Félix Sánchez	3:04.10	
5	Grenada	Joel Redhead, Kirani James, Josh Charles, Rondell Bartholomew	3:04.27	
6	Venezuela	Omar Longart, Alberto Aguilar, José Acevedo, Arturo Ramírez	3:04.93	
7	Puerto Rico	Sean Holston, Jamele Mason, Eric Alejandro, José Cruz	3:05.76	
8	Haiti	Alie Beauvais, Moise Joseph, Roudy Monrose, Pascale Orelus	3:10.28	

=== 20,000 meters walk ===
July 17

Rank	Name	Nationality	Time	Notes
1st place, gold medalist(s)	Allan Segura	Costa Rica	1:28.56.08	
2nd place, silver medalist(s)	Joe Bonilla	Puerto Rico	1:40.18.94	
3rd place, bronze medalist(s)	Luis Ángel López	Puerto Rico	1:40.34.16	
	José Perez	Dominican Republic	DQ	

=== High jump ===
July 17

Rank	Athlete	Nationality	1.90	1.95	2.00	2.05	2.10	2.13	2.16	2.19	2.22	2.25	2.28	2.31	Result	Notes
1st place, gold medalist(s)	Trevor Barry	Bahamas	–	–	–	–	–	o	–	o	–	o	xo	xxx	2.28	
2nd place, silver medalist(s)	James Grayman	Antigua and Barbuda	–	–	–	o	o	–	o	–	o	xo	xxx		2.25	
3rd place, bronze medalist(s)	Darwin Edwards	Saint Lucia	–	–	–	–	xo	o	–	xo	xo	xxo	xxx		2.25	
4	Ryan Ingraham	Bahamas	–	–	–	–	–	o	–	–	xxo	–	xxx		2.22	
5	Wanner Miller	Colombia													2.16	
6	Domanique Missick	Turks and Caicos Islands	–	–	o	–	o	xxx							2.10	
6	Jorge Rouco	Mexico	–	–	–	o	o	xxx							2.10	
6	Thorrold Murray	Barbados	–	–	–	o	o	xxx							2.10	
9	Luis Castro	Puerto Rico	–	–	–	xo	o	–	xxx						2.10	
10	Brandon Williams	Dominica	–	o	–	xxo	xxo	xxx							2.10	
11	Hugo Ramirez	Mexico	–	–	o	o	xxx								2.05	
12	Kerron Stoute	British Virgin Islands	–	o	–	xxo	xxx								2.05	
13	Josue Louis	Haiti	–	o	o	xxx									2.00	
14	Henry Linton	Costa Rica	o	–	xxx										1.90	

=== Pole vault ===
July 16

Rank	Athlete	Nationality	4.60	4.70	4.80	4.90	4.95	5.00	5.20	Result	Notes
1st place, gold medalist(s)	Cristian Sánchez	Mexico	–	–	–	–	o	xo	xxx	5.00	
2nd place, silver medalist(s)	Alexander Castillo	Puerto Rico	–	–	o	o	xxx			4.90	
3rd place, bronze medalist(s)	César González	Venezuela	–	–	xo	o	xxx			4.90	
4	Jabari Ennis	Jamaica	xo	xo	xo	o	xxx			4.90	
5	Yeisel Cintron	Puerto Rico	o	xxo	o	xxx				4.80	
6	Natanael Semeis	Dominican Republic	o	–	xxx					4.60	
7	Rick Valcin	Saint Lucia	xo	xxx						4.60	
	Trevorvano Mackey	Bahamas								DNS	

=== Long jump ===
July 16

Rank	Athlete	Nationality	#1	#2	#3	#4	#5	#6	Result	Notes
1st place, gold medalist(s)	Tyrone Smith	Bermuda	X	7.84	7.74	7.73	7.94	8.06	8.06	
2nd place, silver medalist(s)	Damar Forbes	Jamaica	7.60	X	7.44	5.74	7.49	7.81	7.81	
3rd place, bronze medalist(s)	Raymond Higgs	Bahamas	7.66	7.65	7.56	7.34	X	7.75	7.75	
4	Carl Morgan	Cayman Islands	X	7.32	X	7.43	7.72	X	7.72	
5	Marcos Amalbert	Puerto Rico	7.54	X	7.35	7.54	7.37	7.54	7.54	
6	David Registe	Dominica	7.38	7.36	6.91	6.84	7.38	7.19	7.38	
7	Leon Hunt	United States Virgin Islands	7.29	7.14	7.38	6.85	7.22	7.10	7.38	
8	Luis Rivera	Mexico	7.14	7.24	7.31	7.32	7.23	6.77	7.32	
9	Campbell Kessel	Honduras	X	7.00	7.29				7.29	
10	Troy Bullard	Bahamas	6.61	7.22	7.17				7.22	
11	Jasson Castro	Honduras	7.21	X	7.03				7.21	
12	Eddy Florian	Dominican Republic	5.21	7.17	5.37				7.17	
13	Collister Fahie	United States Virgin Islands	X	X	7.13				7.13	
14	Quincy Breell	Aruba	6.75	6.59	6.69				6.69	
15	Carlos Morgan	Cayman Islands	X	X	5.51				5.51	
	Kyron Blaise	Trinidad and Tobago	X	X	X				NM	
	Joseph Couvertier	Puerto Rico	X	X	X				NM	
	Shakyll Lourens	Aruba	X	X	X				NM	

=== Triple jump ===
July 17

Rank	Athlete	Nationality	#1	#2	#3	#4	#5	#6	Result	Notes
1st place, gold medalist(s)	Samyr Lainé	Haiti	17.09	16.85	16.75	X	–	–	17.09	
2nd place, silver medalist(s)	Osniel Tosca	Cuba	15.97	16.22	16.41	16.20	16.53	16.35	16.53	
3rd place, bronze medalist(s)	Wilbert Walker	Jamaica	15.73	16.01	X	14.78	14.01	16.00	16.01	
4	Muhammad Halim	United States Virgin Islands	15.58	15.95	X	14.38	14.86	15.93	15.95	
5	Michael McCadney	Puerto Rico	X	X	15.52	X	X	15.72	15.72	
6	Jamal Wilson	Bahamas	X	15.14	X	15.21	15.28	15.32	15.32	
7	Barry Batson	Barbados	15.07	15.16	15.12	13.78	14.99	14.90	15.16	
8	Kyron Blaise	Trinidad and Tobago	13.31	15.10	X	X	X	X	15.10	
9	Hasheem Halim	United States Virgin Islands	14.98	14.46	14.94				14.98	
10	Jasson Castro	Honduras	14.86	14.03	14.77				14.86	
	Eddy Florian	Dominican Republic							DNS	

=== Shot put ===
July 15

Rank	Athlete	Nationality	#1	#2	#3	#4	#5	#6	Result	Notes
1st place, gold medalist(s)	O'Dayne Richards	Jamaica	17.78	17.90	18.78	X	X	19.16	19.16	
2nd place, silver medalist(s)	Stephen Saenz	Mexico	17.12	18.24	18.66	X	X	18.65	18.66	
3rd place, bronze medalist(s)	Eder Moreno	Colombia	18.06	18.52	X	18.23	X	X	18.52	
4	Robert Collingwood	Trinidad and Tobago	X	16.03	16.77	X	16.62	X	16.77	
5	Mario Cota	Mexico	15.89	16.52	X	16.23	16.06	X	16.52	
	Jesús Parejo	Venezuela							DNS	

=== Discus throw ===
July 15

Rank	Athlete	Nationality	#1	#2	#3	#4	#5	#6	Result	Notes
1st place, gold medalist(s)	Jason Morgan	Jamaica	59.38	57.85	60.20	57.96	59.68	60.20	60.20	
2nd place, silver medalist(s)	Mario Cota	Mexico	58.56	55.42	55.97	56.03	57.84	58.80	58.80	
3rd place, bronze medalist(s)	Quincy Wilson	Trinidad and Tobago	X	46.57	51.66	X	56.85	56.00	56.85	
4	Jesús Parejo	Venezuela	54.05	54.84	55.00	54.03	53.82	53.33	55.00	
5	Juan Infante	Dominican Republic	51.79	53.71	X	54.76	54.68	X	54.76	
6	Stephen Saenz	Mexico	51.19	X	50.37	50.61	51.52	51.17	51.52	
7	Winston Campbell	Honduras	46.96	44.85	X	X	X	X	46.96	
8	Giovanni Ramos	Puerto Rico	X	46.37	45.81	45.64	44.86	46.37	46.37	

=== Hammer throw ===
July 15

Rank	Athlete	Nationality	#1	#2	#3	#4	#5	#6	Result	Notes
1st place, gold medalist(s)	Roberto Janet	Cuba	71.65	X	X	68.27	70.38	69.89	71.65	
2nd place, silver medalist(s)	Roberto Sawyer	Costa Rica	64.12	65.14	65.96	X	X	64.69	65.96	
3rd place, bronze medalist(s)	Pedro Muñoz	Venezuela	60.73	62.50	X	63.63	X	62.20	63.63	
4	Michael Letterlough	Cayman Islands	53.81	57.32	59.54	61.78	57.92	58.51	61.78	
5	Diego Berrios	Guatemala	X	X	54.17	54.88	X	X	54.88	
	Juan Infante	Dominican Republic							DNS	

=== Javelin throw ===
July 16

Rank	Athlete	Nationality	#1	#2	#3	#4	#5	#6	Result	Notes
1st place, gold medalist(s)	Guillermo Martínez	Cuba	75.30	76.60	76.09	81.55	X	X	81.55	
2nd place, silver medalist(s)	Arley Ibargüen	Colombia	X	70.94	75.71	72.56	74.92	74.53	75.71	
3rd place, bronze medalist(s)	Jaime Dayron Marquez	Colombia	69.82	67.34	68.05	74.07	73.85	70.90	74.07	
4	Keshorn Walcott	Trinidad and Tobago	64.97	69.55	X	69.96	70.33	70.98	70.98	
5	José Lagunes	Mexico	X	64.31	69.37	X	65.26	68.62	69.37	
6	Justin Cummins	Barbados	53.86	68.09	X	66.96	67.18	64.00	68.09	
7	Felipe Ortiz	Puerto Rico	63.11	63.45	67.11	67.51	62.39	62.77	67.51	
8	Luís Taracena	Guatemala	60.10	63.05	57.94	X	57.47	59.71	63.05	
9	Albert Reynolds	Saint Lucia	62.03	56.49	61.69				62.03	
10	Socrates Agesta	Dominican Republic	58.91	49.53	51.04				58.91	
11	Juan Ayala	Puerto Rico	X	52.96	55.29				55.29	
12	Julio Lojo	Panama	50.42	54.99	49.54				54.99	
13	Daniel Bellerophon	Martinique	54.52	53.42	50.88				54.52	
14	Omar Jones	British Virgin Islands	X	49.95	X				49.95	
	Leslain Baird	Guyana							DNS	

=== Decathlon ===
July 15–16

The highest mark recorded in each event is highlighted in yellow

Rank	Athlete	Nationality	100m	LJ	SP	HJ	400m	110m H	DT	PV	JT	1500m	Points	Notes
1st place, gold medalist(s)	Marcos Sanchez	Puerto Rico	11.17	7.04	12.62	1.97	49.62	15.25	43.30	4.40	54.33	4:59.45	7397	
2nd place, silver medalist(s)	Claston Bernard	Jamaica	11.44	7.00	13.09	2.06	53.03	14.58	42.97	4.20	55.78	5:04.52	7299	
3rd place, bronze medalist(s)	Jonathan Davis	Venezuela	11.49	6.56	12.55	1.91	50.79	14.43	43.74	3.40	58.47	5:45.87	6766	
4	Leandro Lopez	Dominican Republic	11.51	6.54	12.25	1.79	50.91	15.94	35.99	3.70	55.37	4:51.83	6606	
5	Darvin Colon	Honduras	11.46	6.64	12.62	1.85	53.28	15.04	42.56	3.50	43.06	5:06.53	6528	
	Geormi Jaramillo	Venezuela	11.02	7.20	13.57	1.79	48.84	14.44	NM	4.00	DNS	–	DNF	
	Steven Marrero	Puerto Rico	11.83	6.83	13.68	1.82	DNF	DNS	–	–	–	–	DNF	

== Women's results ==
=== 100 meters ===
Heats – July 15
Wind:
Heat 1: −1.5 m/s, Heat 2: −1.4 m/s, Heat 3: −1.6 m/s

Rank	Heat	Name	Nationality	Time	Notes
1	2	Semoy Hackett	Trinidad and Tobago	11.48	Q
2	3	Simone Facey	Jamaica	11.57	Q
3	3	Yomara Hinestroza	Colombia	11.63	Q
4	2	Tameka Williams	Saint Kitts and Nevis	11.65	Q
5	1	Jura Levy	Jamaica	11.69	Q
6	2	Eliecit Palacios	Colombia	11.70	q
7	1	Ayanna Hutchinson	Trinidad and Tobago	11.72	Q
8	3	Natasha Joe-Mayers	Saint Vincent and the Grenadines	11.78	q
9	3	Virgil Hodge	Saint Kitts and Nevis	11.79	
10	1	Allison George	Grenada	11.80	
11	1	Shakera Reece	Barbados	11.85	
12	1	Courtney Patterson	United States Virgin Islands	11.88	
13	3	Beatriz Cruz	Puerto Rico	11.93	
14	3	Margarita Manzueta	Dominican Republic	11.94	
15	1	V'Alonne Robinson	Bahamas	11.98	
16	2	Allison Peter	United States Virgin Islands	12.05	
17	2	Hunt Ruth	Panama	12.11	
18	2	Darnetia Robinson	British Virgin Islands	12.23	
19	1	Sunayna Wahi	Suriname	12.37	
	2	Marangeli Cruz	Puerto Rico	DQ	
	3	Fany Chalas	Dominican Republic	DNS	

Final – July 15
Wind:
+0.5 m/s

Rank	Name	Nationality	Time	Notes
1st place, gold medalist(s)	Semoy Hackett	Trinidad and Tobago	11.27	
2nd place, silver medalist(s)	Jura Levy	Jamaica	11.36	
3rd place, bronze medalist(s)	Simone Facey	Jamaica	11.39	
4	Yomara Hinestroza	Colombia	11.46	
5	Ayanna Hutchinson	Trinidad and Tobago	11.56	
6	Eliecit Palacios	Colombia	11.59	
7	Tameka Williams	Saint Kitts and Nevis	11.75	
	Natasha Joe-Mayers	Saint Vincent and the Grenadines	DNS	

=== 200 meters ===
Heats – July 16
Wind:
Heat 1: +0.1 m/s, Heat 2: −0.1 m/s, Heat 3: +0.4 m/s, Heat 4: +1.1 m/s

Rank	Heat	Name	Nationality	Time	Notes
1	1	Nivea Smith	Bahamas	23.18	Q
2	3	Anthonique Strachan	Bahamas	23.29	Q
3	4	Allison Peter	United States Virgin Islands	23.30	Q
4	4	Simone Facey	Jamaica	23.36	q
5	1	Anastasia Le-Roy	Jamaica	23.43	q
6	3	Norma González	Colombia	23.45	q
7	1	Maria Alejandra Idrobo	Colombia	23.51	q
8	2	Janelle Redhead	Grenada	23.58	Q
9	2	Tameka Williams	Saint Kitts and Nevis	23.63	
10	3	Allison George	Grenada	23.71	
11	4	Mariely Sánchez	Dominican Republic	23.95	
12	1	Carol Rodriguez	Puerto Rico	23.98	
13	2	Marlena Wesh	Haiti	24.08	
14	1	Virgil Hodge	Saint Kitts and Nevis	24.28	
15	2	Genoiska Cancel	Puerto Rico	24.37	
16	4	Sunayna Wahi	Suriname	24.47	
17	1	Magnolia Howell	Trinidad and Tobago	24.60	
18	1	Hunt Ruth	Panama	24.66	
19	4	Karene King	British Virgin Islands	24.72	
20	3	Enirahs Martina	Curaçao	24.96	
21	2	Nayeli Vela	Mexico	24.97	
22	3	Courtney Patterson	United States Virgin Islands	25.02	
23	3	Britney Wattley	British Virgin Islands	25.85	
	2	Marleny Mejía	Dominican Republic	DQ	
	2	V'Alonne Robinson	Bahamas	DNS	

Final – July 17
Wind:
+1.4 m/s

Rank	Name	Nationality	Time	Notes
1st place, gold medalist(s)	Nivea Smith	Bahamas	22.80	
2nd place, silver medalist(s)	Anthonique Strachan	Bahamas	22.90	
3rd place, bronze medalist(s)	Anastasia Le-Roy	Jamaica	23.13	
4	Allison Peter	United States Virgin Islands	23.25	
5	Janelle Redhead	Grenada	23.58	
6	Maria Alejandra Idrobo	Colombia	23.79	
	Simone Facey	Jamaica	DNS	
	Norma González	Colombia	DNS	

=== 400 meters ===
Heats – July 15

Rank	Heat	Name	Nationality	Time	Notes
1	1	Jenifer Padilla	Colombia	52.20	Q
2	1	Shereefa Lloyd	Jamaica	52.21	Q
3	1	Aliann Pompey	Guyana	52.26	q
4	3	Norma González	Colombia	52.81	Q
5	3	Ashley Kelly	British Virgin Islands	53.40	Q
6	2	Patricia Hall	Jamaica	53.63	Q
7	1	Nayeli Vela	Mexico	53.86	q
8	2	Marlena Wesh	Haiti	54.11	Q
8	3	Raysa Sanchez	Dominican Republic	54.11	
10	2	Cache Armbrister	Bahamas	54.26	
11	1	Lanece Clarke	Bahamas	54.32	
12	1	Kanika Beckles	Grenada	54.61	
13	3	Grace Claxton	Puerto Rico	54.76	
14	3	Sade Sealy	Barbados	55.11	
15	2	Nadia Cummins	Barbados	55.26	
16	3	Kineke Alexander	Saint Vincent and the Grenadines	55.41	
17	2	Diana Taylor	Dominican Republic	55.95	
18	2	Trish Bartholomew	Grenada	56.47	

Final – July 15

Rank	Name	Nationality	Time	Notes
1st place, gold medalist(s)	Shereefa Lloyd	Jamaica	51.69	
2nd place, silver medalist(s)	Patricia Hall	Jamaica	51.85	
3rd place, bronze medalist(s)	Norma González	Colombia	51.90	
4	Aliann Pompey	Guyana	52.02	
5	Jenifer Padilla	Colombia	52.97	
6	Ashley Kelly	British Virgin Islands	54.00	
7	Nayeli Vela	Mexico	54.21	
8	Marlena Wesh	Haiti	54.49	

=== 800 meters ===
Heats – July 16

Rank	Heat	Name	Nationality	Time	Notes
1	1	Neisha Bernard-Thomas	Grenada	2:05.54	Q
2	1	Natoya Goule	Jamaica	2:05.83	Q
3	1	Cristina Guevara	Mexico	2:05.99	Q
4	1	Muriel Coneo	Colombia	2:06.08	q
5	2	Rosemary Almanza	Cuba	2:09.36	Q
6	2	Clora Williams	Jamaica	2:09.58	Q
7	2	Gabriela Medina	Mexico	2:09.75	Q
8	1	Belissa del Valle	Puerto Rico	2:10.22	q
9	2	María Mancebo	Dominican Republic	2:11.87	
10	2	Michelle Lopez	Puerto Rico	2:12.10	
11	2	Kimberly Piard	Haiti	2:18.77	
12	1	Ninfa Barnard	United States Virgin Islands	2:19.16	
13	1	Eline Van Den Broek	Curaçao	2:24.41	

Final – July 17

Rank	Name	Nationality	Time	Notes
1st place, gold medalist(s)	Gabriela Medina	Mexico	2:01.50	
2nd place, silver medalist(s)	Rosemary Almanza	Cuba	2:02.23	
3rd place, bronze medalist(s)	Natoya Goule	Jamaica	2:02.83	
4	Neisha Bernard-Thomas	Grenada	2:03.56	
5	Cristina Guevara	Mexico	2:05.26	
6	Muriel Coneo	Colombia	2:08.60	
7	Belissa del Valle	Puerto Rico	2:19.26	
	Clora Williams	Jamaica	DNF	

=== 1500 meters ===
July 15

Rank	Name	Nationality	Time	Notes
1st place, gold medalist(s)	Sandra Lopez	Mexico	4:22.65	
2nd place, silver medalist(s)	Korene Hinds	Jamaica	4:23.78	
3rd place, bronze medalist(s)	Pilar McShine	Trinidad and Tobago	4:24.93	
4	Muriel Coneo	Colombia	4:25.45	
5	María Mancebo	Dominican Republic	4:28.07	
6	Belissa del Valle	Puerto Rico	4:28.19	
7	Gladys Landaverde	El Salvador	4:30.07	
8	Iracema Parra	Mexico	4:33.32	
9	Evonne Marroquinn	Guatemala	4:37.03	
10	Hughnique Rolle	Bahamas	4:58.55	

=== 5000 meters ===
July 16

Rank	Name	Nationality	Time	Notes
1st place, gold medalist(s)	Marisol Romero	Mexico	16:05.68	
2nd place, silver medalist(s)	Sandra Lopez	Mexico	16:06.83	
3rd place, bronze medalist(s)	Johana Rivero	Colombia	17:23.01	
	Hunhique Rolle	Bahamas	DNF	

=== Half marathon ===
July 17

Rank	Name	Nationality	Time	Notes
1st place, gold medalist(s)	Michelle Coira	Puerto Rico	1:21:07	
2nd place, silver medalist(s)	Maria del Pilar Díaz	Puerto Rico	1:21:45	
3rd place, bronze medalist(s)	Maria Montilla	Venezuela	1:22:20	
4	Nora Flores	Mexico	1:23:48	
5	Zenaida Maldonado	Puerto Rico	1:32:27	
6	Ana Herrera	Dominican Republic	1:40:37	

=== 100 meters hurdles ===
Heats – July 15
Wind:
Heat 1: −3.3 m/s, Heat 2: −3.8 m/s, Heat 3: −1.9 m/s

Rank	Heat	Name	Nationality	Time	Notes
1	1	Vonette Dixon	Jamaica	13.51	Q
2	3	Brigitte Merlano	Colombia	13.53	Q
3	2	Lina Flórez	Colombia	13.63	Q
4	3	Aleesha Barber	Trinidad and Tobago	13.64	Q
5	2	Kierre Beckles	Barbados	13.70	Q
6	2	Andrea Bliss	Jamaica	13.79	q
7	3	Ivanique Kemp	Bahamas	13.81	q
8	3	LaVonne Idlette	Dominican Republic	13.92	
9	3	Alyssa Costas	Puerto Rico	14.13	
10	1	Petra McDonald	Bahamas	14.14	Q
11	1	Ana Lorenzo	Dominican Republic	14.27	
12	1	Litzy Vazquez	Puerto Rico	14.35	
13	2	Aida Villareal	Mexico	14.38	
14	2	Nashalie Issac	Puerto Rico	14.44	
15	3	Kenrisha Brathwaite	Barbados	14.63	
16	1	Jeimy Bernárdez	Honduras	14.64	
17	1	Carla Rodríguez	Mexico	14.72	
	2	Wanetta Kirby	United States Virgin Islands	DNS	

July 17
Wind:
+0.9 m/s

Rank	Name	Nationality	Time	Notes
1st place, gold medalist(s)	Vonette Dixon	Jamaica	12.77	
2nd place, silver medalist(s)	Brigitte Merlano	Colombia	12.89	NR
3rd place, bronze medalist(s)	Lina Flórez	Colombia	12.94	
4	Kierre Beckles	Barbados	13.24	
5	Aleesha Barber	Trinidad and Tobago	13.29	
6	Ivanique Kemp	Bahamas	13.37	
7	Andrea Bliss	Jamaica	13.50	
8	Petra McDonald	Bahamas	13.84	

=== 400 meters hurdles ===
Heats – July 15

Rank	Heat	Name	Nationality	Time	Notes
1	1	Josanne Lucas	Trinidad and Tobago	56.94	Q
2	1	Yolanda Osana	Dominican Republic	57.20	Q
3	1	Sharolyn Scott	Costa Rica	57.66	Q
4	2	Andrea Sutherland	Jamaica	57.71	Q
5	2	Katrina Seymour	Bahamas	57.99	Q
6	1	Sheryl Morgan	Jamaica	58.37	q
7	2	Princesa Oliveros	Colombia	58.57	Q
8	2	Latoya Griffith	Barbados	1:00.58	q
9	1	Erika Rodríguez	Mexico	1:00.80	
10	2	Karla Duenas	Mexico	1:02.03	
11	1	Alyssa Costas	Puerto Rico	1:03.27	
12	2	Silkia Vazquez	Puerto Rico	1:03.60	

Final – July 16

Rank	Name	Nationality	Time	Notes
1st place, gold medalist(s)	Andrea Sutherland	Jamaica	56.75	
2nd place, silver medalist(s)	Yolanda Osana	Dominican Republic	57.23	
3rd place, bronze medalist(s)	Katrina Seymour	Bahamas	57.24	
4	Sheryl Morgan	Jamaica	57.25	
5	Josanne Lucas	Trinidad and Tobago	58.27	
6	Princesa Oliveros	Colombia	58.52	
7	Sharolyn Scott	Costa Rica	58.86	
8	Latoya Griffith	Barbados	59.42	

=== 3000 meters steeplechase ===
July 17

Rank	Name	Nationality	Time	Notes
1st place, gold medalist(s)	Korene Hinds	Jamaica	9:54:67	
2nd place, silver medalist(s)	Beverly Ramos	Puerto Rico	9:58:11	
3rd place, bronze medalist(s)	Sara Prieto	Mexico	10:42:65	
4	Zuna Portillo	El Salvador	10:54:80	
5	Evonne Marroquinn	Guatemala	10:58:39	
6	Yolanda Ugalde	Mexico	11:09:51	
7	Melínda Martínez	Puerto Rico	11:30:41	
8	Scarla Nero	Trinidad and Tobago	11:33:66	

=== 4 × 100 meters relay ===
July 16

Rank	Nation	Competitors	Time	Notes
1st place, gold medalist(s)	Trinidad and Tobago	Magnolia Howell, Michelle-Lee Ayhe, Ayanna Hutchinson, Semoy Hackett	43.47	
2nd place, silver medalist(s)	Jamaica	Jura Levy, Anastasia Le-Roy, Simone Facey, Patricia Hall	43.63	
3rd place, bronze medalist(s)	Bahamas	V'Alonne Robinson, Nivea Smith, Cache Armbrister, Anthonique Strachan	43.74	
4	Colombia	Eliecit Palacios, Maria Alejandra Idrobo, Yomara Hinestroza, Darlenis Obregón	43.92	
5	Dominican Republic	LaVonne Idlette, Fany Chalas, Marleny Mejía, Margarita Manzueta	44.68	
	Puerto Rico	Beatriz Cruz, Genoiska Cancel, Marangeli Cruz, Carol Rodríguez	DNF	

=== 4 × 400 meters relay ===
July 17

Rank	Nation	Competitors	Time	Notes
1st place, gold medalist(s)	Jamaica	Andrea Sutherland, Shereefa Lloyd, Natoya Goule, Patricia Hall	3:29.86	
2nd place, silver medalist(s)	Dominican Republic	Raysa Sanchez, Diana Taylor, Rosa Fabian, Yolanda Osana	3:34.73	
3rd place, bronze medalist(s)	Trinidad and Tobago	Alena Harriman, Magnolia Howell, Josanne Lucas, Afiya Walker	3:34.84	
4	Mexico	Erika Rodríguez, Karla Duenas, Nayeli Vela, Gabriela Medina	3:35.12	
5	Puerto Rico	Grace Claxton, Beatriz Cruz, Genoiska Cancel, Michelle Lopez	3:39.37	
	Grenada	Trish Bartholomew, Janelle Redhead, Kanika Beckles, Neisha Bernard-Thomas	DNS	

=== 10,000 meters walk ===
July 17

Rank	Name	Nationality	Time	Notes
1st place, gold medalist(s)	Milanggela Rosales	Venezuela	47.19.91	CR
2nd place, silver medalist(s)	Sandra Galvis	Colombia	48.23.59	
3rd place, bronze medalist(s)	Wilane Cuebas	Puerto Rico	55.52.53	

=== High jump ===
July 16

Rank	Athlete	Nationality	1.60	1.65	1.70	1.73	1.76	1.79	1.82	1.85	1.88	Result	Notes
1st place, gold medalist(s)	Levern Spencer	Saint Lucia	–	–	–	–	–	–	o	x–	xx	1.82	
2nd place, silver medalist(s)	Marielys Rojas	Venezuela	–	–	o	xo	o	xo	o	xxx		1.82	
3rd place, bronze medalist(s)	Fabiola Ayala	Mexico	–	o	o	o	o	o	xxx			1.79	
4	Romary Rifka	Mexico	–	o	o	–	xo	o	xxx			1.79	
5	Alysbeth Felix	Puerto Rico	–	o	o	xxx						1.70	
5	Caterine Nina	Dominican Republic	–	o	o	xxx						1.70	
7	Yosually Ortiz	Puerto Rico	o	xxx								1.60	

=== Pole vault ===
July 15

Rank	Athlete	Nationality	3.30	3.40	3.50	3.60	3.70	3.80	3.90	3.95	4.00	4.10	4.20	Result	Notes
1st place, gold medalist(s)	Keisa Monterola	Venezuela	–	–	–	–	–	–	–	–	o	–	xxx	4.00	
2nd place, silver medalist(s)	Milena Agudelo	Colombia	–	–	–	–	–	–	o	o	xxx			3.95	
3rd place, bronze medalist(s)	Andrea Zambrana	Puerto Rico	–	–	–	xo	x–	o	xxx					3.80	
4	Cecilia Villar	Mexico	–	–	–	xo	o	xxo	xxx					3.80	
5	Carmelita Correa	Mexico	–	–	–	xo	o	xxx						3.70	
6	Alexandra Gonzalez	Puerto Rico	–	xo	–	o	xxx							3.60	
7	Carmen Díaz	Puerto Rico	o	–	o	xxx								3.50	
	Dailis Caballero	Cuba	–	–	–	–	–	–	–	–	–	xxx		NM	

=== Long jump ===
Final – July 17

Rank	Athlete	Nationality	#1	#2	#3	#4	#5	#6	Result	Notes
1st place, gold medalist(s)	Bianca Stuart	Bahamas	X	X	6.38	X	6.81	6.72	6.81	=CR, NR
2nd place, silver medalist(s)	Arantxa King	Bermuda	6.11	X	X	6.20	6.47	X	6.47	
3rd place, bronze medalist(s)	Yvonne Trevino	Mexico	6.01	6.20	6.19	6.30	X	6.09	6.30	
4	Chantel Malone	British Virgin Islands	X	6.05	6.23	X	6.20	6.21	6.23	
5	Yanique Levy	Jamaica	X	6.19w	5.90	X	6.07	6.18	6.19w	
6	Zoila Flores	Mexico	6.06	6.11w	X	X	6.08	5.91	6.11w	
7	Ayanna Alexander	Trinidad and Tobago	5.62	5.52	6.06w	5.91	5.71	5.80	6.06w	
8	Jasmine Brunson	Bermuda	X	X	6.01	X	X	X	6.01	
9	Euzhan Varlin	Martinique	5.54	X	5.95				5.95	
10	Francine Simpson	Jamaica	X	X	5.94				5.94	
11	Tanika Liburd	Saint Kitts and Nevis	X	X	5.71				5.71	
12	Yosiri Urrutia	Colombia	X	X	5.69				5.69	
13	Estefany Cruz	Guatemala	5.34	5.55	5.65				5.65	
14	Fabiola Taylor	Dominican Republic	X	5.64	5.33				5.64	
15	Ana José	Dominican Republic	5.50	X	5.63				5.63	
16	Enirahs Martina	Curaçao	4.94	5.47	5.59				5.59	
17	Ana Camargo	Guatemala	5.53	X	5.20				5.53	

=== Triple jump ===
July 15

Rank	Athlete	Nationality	#1	#2	#3	#4	#5	#6	Result	Notes
1st place, gold medalist(s)	Ayanna Alexander	Trinidad and Tobago	X	X	12.65	13.15	13.50	12.98	13.50	
2nd place, silver medalist(s)	Aida Villareal	Mexico	13.06	13.03	13.14	13.17	13.40	12.86	13.40	
3rd place, bronze medalist(s)	Ana José	Dominican Republic	11.66	12.66	13.11	12.87	13.07	13.10	13.11	
4	Estefany Cruz	Guatemala	12.65	X	13.08	12.93	12.63	11.73	13.08	
5	Pascale Delauney	Haiti	12.32	12.55	12.75	12.69	12.66	12.65	12.75	
6	Tamara Myers	Bahamas	11.94	X	12.45	X	12.03	11.89	12.45	
7	Fabiola Taylor	Dominican Republic	12.04	12.20	X	11.98	–	–	12.20	
	Ana Camargo	Guatemala	X	X	X	X	X	X	NM	

=== Shot put ===
July 17

Rank	Athlete	Nationality	#1	#2	#3	#4	#5	#6	Result	Notes
1st place, gold medalist(s)	Cleopatra Borel-Brown	Trinidad and Tobago	18.74	17.85	19.00	18.79	18.65	18.97	19.00	
2nd place, silver medalist(s)	Angela Rivas	Colombia	16.68	17.12	17.01	16.01	X	16.87	17.12	
3rd place, bronze medalist(s)	Annie Alexander	Trinidad and Tobago	16.57	17.05	X	16.86	16.32	16.38	17.05	
4	Sandra Lemos	Colombia	15.11	X	15.15	15.59	X	14.93	15.59	
5	Margarita Bernardo	Dominican Republic	X	15.07	X	14.36	15.35	X	15.35	
6	Kimberly Barrett	Puerto Rico	13.64	14.29	14.07	14.83	14.28	15.22	15.22	
7	Trisha Henry	Dominica	X	14.00	14.37	14.49	X	X	14.49	

=== Discus throw ===
July 15

Rank	Athlete	Nationality	#1	#2	#3	#4	#5	#6	Result	Notes
1st place, gold medalist(s)	Denia Caballero	Cuba	X	62.06	61.67	X	59.69	X	62.06	
2nd place, silver medalist(s)	Brittany Borrero	Puerto Rico	51.17	52.39	52.04	54.03	53.49	52.27	54.03	
3rd place, bronze medalist(s)	Allison Randall	Jamaica	48.59	48.89	50.84	49.24	52.75	48.53	52.75	
4	Annie Alexander	Trinidad and Tobago	51.15	X	X	51.62	X	52.28	52.28	
5	Maria Cubillan	Venezuela	49.10	X	52.13	X	49.08	47.74	52.13	
6	Joeane Jadotte	Haiti	48.74	X	50.00	48.28	X	48.94	50.00	
7	Ednie Limage	Haiti	X	45.84	43.14	X	44.22	44.59	45.84	
8	Irais Estrada	Mexico	45.21	X	42.66	X	X	X	45.21	
9	Paulina Flores	Mexico	45.09	43.62	X				45.09	
10	Marie-Christine Vulcain	Martinique	41.64	43.49	42.45				43.49	
11	Melissa Alfred	Dominica	40.30	X	36.49				40.30	

=== Hammer throw ===
July 15

Rank	Athlete	Nationality	#1	#2	#3	#4	#5	#6	Result	Notes
1st place, gold medalist(s)	Eli Johana Moreno	Colombia	64.78	65.39	67.97	64.74	X	66.98	67.97	
2nd place, silver medalist(s)	Rosa Rodríguez	Venezuela	65.74	62.85	63.20	X	X	65.09	65.09	
3rd place, bronze medalist(s)	Natalie Grant	Jamaica	60.38	60.83	59.15	62.46	60.76	X	62.46	
4	Sharon Ayala	Mexico	59.56	57.74	61.51	X	59.77	X	61.51	
5	Althea Charles	Antigua and Barbuda	X	50.89	X	X	49.79	56.45	56.45	

=== Javelin throw ===
July 17

Rank	Athlete	Nationality	#1	#2	#3	#4	#5	#6	Result	Notes
1st place, gold medalist(s)	Fresa Núñez	Dominican Republic	51.56	51.61	50.17	50.51	54.29	X	54.29	NR
2nd place, silver medalist(s)	Flor Ruiz	Colombia	53.58	53.85	52.89	52.45	48.51	54.02	54.02	
3rd place, bronze medalist(s)	Abigail Gomez	Mexico	52.11	48.32	53.13	X	50.52	X	53.13	
4	Coralys Ortiz	Puerto Rico	X	44.95	47.09	50.21	52.32	50.82	52.32	
5	Laverne Eve	Bahamas	50.41	X	49.57	X	50.28	50.06	50.41	
6	Daliadiz Ortiz	Puerto Rico	45.24	X	47.55	46.66	45.28	X	47.55	
	María Lucelly Murillo	Colombia							DNS	

=== Heptathlon ===
July 16–17

The highest mark recorded in each event is highlighted in yellow

Rank	Athlete	Nationality	100m H	HJ	SP	200m	LJ	JT	800m	Points	Notes
1st place, gold medalist(s)	Gretchen Quintana	Cuba	13.92w	1.68	13.01	24.80	5.85	37.02	2:19.00	5704	
2nd place, silver medalist(s)	Francia Manzanillo	Dominican Republic	14.20	1.62	12.64	24.72	5.65	40.45	2:17.72	5601	
3rd place, bronze medalist(s)	Peaches Roach	Jamaica	13.80	1.80	10.94	24.36	5.41	33.72	2:18.33	5589	
4	Makeba Alcide	Saint Lucia	14.16	1.74	11.05	25.54	5.33	32.94	2:22.90	5263	
5	Ana Lorenzo	Dominican Republic	14.04w	1.56	11.95	25.63	5.77	38.75	2:31.26	5250	
6	Shianne Smith	Bermuda	14.75	1.59	10.61	24.90	5.51	33.29	2:16.52	5177	
7	Wanetta Kirby	United States Virgin Islands	13.76w	1.71	9.49	24.58	5.89	21.22	2:44.72	4950	
8	Ana Maria Porras	Costa Rica	15.07w	1.62	9.32	26.74	5.57	25.40	2:26.69	4655	
9	Andrea Jackson	Bermuda	15.33w	1.56	11.98	26.99	4.75	23.51	3:10.82	3978	
