= Jeffrey Julmis =

Haitian-American hurdler

Personal information
- Full name: Jeffrey Michael Julmis
- Nationality: Haitian-American
- Born: September 30, 1987 (age 38) Fort Lauderdale, Florida, United States
- Height: 1.89 m (6 ft 2 in)
- Weight: 79 kg (174 lb)

Sport
- Country: Haiti
- Sport: Track and field
- Event: 110m Hurdles
- Updated on 21 December 2014

Jeffrey Michael Julmis (born September 30, 1987) is a Haitian-American hurdler. He was born in Fort Lauderdale, Florida, United States. He competed in the 110 m hurdles event at the 2016 Summer Olympics, and performed well enough in his heat to qualify for the semifinals. During the semifinal round, Julmis violently crashed and tumbled over the first hurdle, causing a disqualification. In spite of this, Julmis ran the remainder of the race and received a standing ovation as he left the track.

Before his Olympic debut, Julmis was an All-American hurdler for the Kansas State Wildcats track and field team, placing 4th in the 110 m hurdles at the 2011 NCAA Division I Outdoor Track and Field Championships.

== Personal bests ==
=== Outdoor ===
- 200 m: 21.64 s (wind: +1.8 m/s) – Arkansas City, Kansas, 9 May 2009
- 110 m hurdles: 13.47 s (wind: +2.0 m/s) – Clermont, FL, 14 May 2016

=== Indoor ===
- Ran a 6.37 60m time in February 26, 2016

== International competitions ==
Year	Competition	Venue	Position	Event	Notes
Representing Haiti
2011	Central American and Caribbean Championships	Mayagüez, Puerto Rico	10th (h)	110m hurdles	14.19 (-3.9 m/s)
2011	Central American and Caribbean Championships	Mayagüez, Puerto Rico	8th	4 × 100 m relay	40.82
2011	Pan American Games	Guadalajara, Mexico	13th (h)	110m hurdles	13.87 (+1.8 m/s)
2012	Olympic Games	London, United Kingdom	8th (h)	110m hurdles	13.87 (+0.5 m/s)
2013	Central American and Caribbean Championships	Morelia, Mexico	4th	110m hurdles	13.83 A (-3.4 m/s)
2014	Central American and Caribbean Games	Xalapa, Mexico	3rd (h)^{1}	110m hurdles	14.02 A (-1.6 m/s)
2015	NACAC Championships	San José, Costa Rica	5th (sf)	110m hurdles	13.67 (+1.2 m/s)
2015	Pan American Games	Toronto, Canada	13th (h)	110m hurdles	13.72 (-0.1 m/s)
2016	Olympic Games	Rio de Janeiro, Brazil	24th (h)	110m hurdles	13.66^{1}
2017	World Championships	London, United Kingdom	35th (h)	110 m hurdles	13.78
2018	Central American and Caribbean Games	Barranquilla, Colombia	–	110 m hurdles	DQ
2018	NACAC Championships	Toronto, Canada	4th	110 m hurdles	13.63
2019	Pan American Games	Lima, Peru	11th (h)	110 m hurdles	14.02
2019	World Championships	Doha, Qatar	–	110 m hurdles	DQ

^{1}Disqualified in the semifinals
