= Alberto Aguilar (sprinter) =

Venezuelan sprinter (born 1985)

Personal information
- Full name: Alberto Martín Aguilar Suárez
- Born: 9 March 1985 (age 41) San Fernando de Apure, Venezuela
- Height: 1.94 m (6 ft 4 in)
- Weight: 80 kg (176 lb)

Sport
- Country: Venezuela
- Sport: Athletics
- Updated on 22 December 2014

Alberto Martín Aguilar Suárez (Note: In this Spanish name, the first or paternal surname is Aguilar and the second or maternal family name is Suárez.) (born 9 March 1985) is a Venezuelan sprinter. He competed in the 4 × 400 m relay event at the 2012 Summer Olympics.

== Personal bests ==
- 100 m: 10.55 s (wind: +0.7 m/s) – Barquisimeto, Venezuela, 15 May 2014
- 200 m: 21.19 s (wind: +0.4 m/s) – San Felipe, Venezuela, 9 May 2014
- 400 m: 45.71 s – Barquisimeto, Venezuela, 15 May 2014

== International competitions ==
Year	Competition	Venue	Position	Event	Notes
Representing Venezuela
2009	Bolivarian Games	Sucre, Bolivia	1st	400 m	46.54 s A
2009	Bolivarian Games	Sucre, Bolivia	1st	4 × 400 m relay	3:06.91 min A
2010	Central American and Caribbean Games	Mayagüez, Puerto Rico	–	400 m	DNF
2010	Central American and Caribbean Games	Mayagüez, Puerto Rico	6th	4 × 400 m relay	3:07.98 min
2011	Central American and Caribbean Championships	Mayagüez, Puerto Rico	3rd (h)	400 m	47.44 s
2011	Central American and Caribbean Championships	Mayagüez, Puerto Rico	6th	4 × 400 m relay	3:04.93 min
2011	ALBA Games	Barquisimeto, Venezuela	6th	400 m	46.86 s
2011	ALBA Games	Barquisimeto, Venezuela	1st	4 × 400 m relay	3:04.83 min
2011	Pan American Games	Guadalajara, Mexico	5th (h)	400 m	46.39 s A
2011	Pan American Games	Guadalajara, Mexico	3rd	4 × 400 m relay	3:00.82 min A NR
2012	World Indoor Championships	Istanbul, Turkey	3rd (h)	4 × 400 m relay	3:11.11 min
2012	Olympic Games	London, United Kingdom	7th	4 × 400 m relay	3:02.18 min
2013	South American Championships	Cartagena, Colombia	3rd	4 × 100 m relay	39.76
2013	South American Championships	Cartagena, Colombia	1st	4 × 400 m relay	3:03.64
2013	World Championships	Moscow, Russia	9th (h)	4 × 400 m relay	3:02.04
2014	South American Games	Santiago, Chile	6th	400 m	47.03
2014	Central American and Caribbean Games	Xalapa, Mexico	3rd	4 × 100 m relay	39.22 A
2014	Central American and Caribbean Games	Xalapa, Mexico	2nd	4 × 400 m relay	3:01.80 A
2015	South American Championships	Lima, Peru	1st	4 × 400 m relay	3:04.96
2017	IAAF World Relays	Nassau, Bahamas	11th (h)	4 × 200 m relay	1:25.69
2017	South American Championships	Asunción, Paraguay	3rd	4 × 400 m relay	3:07.74
2017	Bolivarian Games	Santa Marta, Colombia	3rd	400 m	46.68
2017	Bolivarian Games	Santa Marta, Colombia	8th	800 m	1:54.54
2017	Bolivarian Games	Santa Marta, Colombia	2nd	4 × 400 m relay	3:06.32
2018	South American Games	Cochabamba, Bolivia	2nd	4 × 100 m relay	39.03
2018	South American Games	Cochabamba, Bolivia	2nd	4 × 400 m relay	3:05.75
2018	Central American and Caribbean Games	Barranquilla, Colombia	9th (sf)	200 m	20.96
2018	Central American and Caribbean Games	Barranquilla, Colombia	7th	4 × 100 m relay	39.63
2018	Central American and Caribbean Games	Barranquilla, Colombia	4th	4 × 400 m relay	3:06.62
2019	World Relays	Yokohama, Japan	21st (h)	4 × 100 m relay	39.76
2019	South American Championships	Lima, Peru	1st	4 × 100 m relay	39.56
2019	Pan American Games	Lima, Peru	8th	4 × 100 m relay	39.73
