= List of Central American and Caribbean Championships in Athletics records =

The Central American and Caribbean Championships in Athletics is an athletics event which began in 1967. Records set by athletes who are representing one of the Central American and Caribbean Athletic Confederation's member states.

== Men's records ==
Event	Record	Name	Nationality	Date	Championships	Ref.
100 m	10.02 (+1.9 m/s)	Darrel Brown	Trinidad and Tobago	9 July 2005	2005 Nassau	
100 m	10.02 (+1.9 m/s)	Marc Burns	Trinidad and Tobago	9 July 2005	2005 Nassau	
200 m	20.03 (+1.8 m/s)	Usain Bolt	Jamaica	11 July 2005	2005 Nassau	
400 m	44.84	Roberto Hernández	Cuba	28 July 1989	1989 San Juan	
800 m	1:45.56	Yeimer López	Cuba	5 July 2009	2009 Havana	
1500 m	3:41.27	Liston McKenzie	Jamaica	27 July 1989	1989 San Juan	
5000 m	13:53.30	Francisco Pacheco	Mexico	27 July 1985	1985 Havana	
10,000 m	28:54.06	Juan Romero	Mexico	15 July 2011	2011 Mayagüez	
Half marathon	1:02:11	Marcelino Crisanto	Mexico	1 August 1993	1993 Cali	
110 m hurdles	13.43 (−0.3 m/s)	Ryan Brathwaite	Barbados	3 July 2009	2009 Havana	
400 m hurdles	48.51	Javier Culson	Puerto Rico	5 July 2009	2009 Havana	
3000 m steeplechase	8:30.08	José Alberto Sánchez	Cuba	4 July 2009	2009 Havana	
High jump	2.44 m	Javier Sotomayor	Cuba	29 July 1989	1989 San Juan	
Pole vault	5.61 m	Dominic Johnson	Saint Lucia	27 June 1999	1999 Bridgetown	
Long jump	8.31 m (−0.1 m/s)	Wilfredo Martinez	Cuba	6 July 2008	2008 Cali	
Triple jump	17.33 m (−0.1 m/s)	Alexis Copello	Cuba	5 July 2009	2009 Havana	
Shot put	20.97 m	O'Dayne Richards	Jamaica	7 July 2013	2013 Morelia	
Discus throw	66.50 m	Luis Mariano Delis	Cuba	25 July 1985	1985 Havana	
Hammer throw	74.98 m	Alberto Sánchez	Cuba	1 August 1993	1993 Cali	
Javelin throw	82.16 m (Current design)	Guillermo Martínez	Cuba	4 July 2009	2009 Havana	
Javelin throw	82.24 m A (Old design)	Reinaldo Patterson	Cuba	July 1979	1979 Guadalajara	
Decathlon	8654 pts NR	Leonel Suárez	Cuba	3-4 July 2009	2009 Havana	
Decathlon	100m (wind) / Long jump (wind) / Shot put / High jump / 400m / 110m H (wind) / Discus / Pole vault / Javelin / 1500m; 11.07 (+0.7 m/s) / 7.42 m (+0.8 m/s) / 14.39 m / 2.09 m / 47.65 / 14.15 (−0.6 m/s) / 46.07 m / 4.70 m / 77.47 m / 4:27.29					
20,000 m (track)	1:20:54.9	Jéfferson Pérez	Ecuador	5 July 2008	2008 Cali	
20 km walk (road)	1:20:49	Noe Hernandez	Mexico	25 June 1999	1999 Bridgetown	
4 × 100 m relay	38.47	Aaron Armstrong; Marc Burns; Jacey Harper; Darrel Brown	Trinidad and Tobago	10 July 2005	2005 Nassau	
4 × 400 m relay	3:00.83	Orville Taylor; Brandon Simpson; Mario Watts; Danny McFarlane	Jamaica	22 July 2001	2001 Guatemala City	

Key:
^{WR} World record	^{CACR} Central American and Caribbean record	^{NR} National record	^{PB} Athlete's personal best

== Women's records ==
Event	Record	Name	Nationality	Date	Games	Ref.
100 m	11.02 (+1.1 m/s)	Chandra Sturrup	Bahamas	9 July 2005	2005 Nassau	
200 m	22.36	Grace Jackson	Jamaica	28 July 1989	1989 San Juan	
400 m	50.63	Ana Fidelia Quirot	Cuba	27 July 1989	1989 San Juan	
800 m	1.59.01	Ana Fidelia Quirot	Cuba	27 June 1997	1997 San Juan	
1500 m	4:18.00	Ana Fidelia Quirot	Cuba	28 June 1997	1997 San Juan	
5000 m	16.03.68	Yudileyvis Castillo	Cuba	5 July 2009	2009 Havana	
10,000 m	33:50.68	Yudileyvis Castillo	Cuba	3 July 2009	2009 Havana	
Half marathon	1:12:07	Stella Castro	Colombia	1 August 1993	1993 Cali	
100 m hurdles	12.61 (+1.4 m/s) NR	Anay Tejeda	Cuba	5 July 2008	2008 Cali	
400 m hurdles	55.12	Allison Beckford	Jamaica	5 July 2003	2003 Saint George's	
3000 m steeplechase	9.54.01	Mardrea Hyman	Jamaica	10 July 2005	2005 Nassau	
High jump	1.95 m	Levern Spencer	Saint Lucia	5 July 2013	2013 Morelia	
Pole vault	4.40 m	Yarisley Silva	Cuba	3 July 2009	2009 Havana	-
Long jump	6.81 m (+0.3 m/s)	Elva Goulbourne	Jamaica	5 July 2003	2003 Saint George's	
Long jump	6.81 m (+0.7 m/s) NR	Bianca Stuart	Bahamas	17 July 2011	2011 Mayagüez	
Triple jump	14.97 m (−0.5 m/s)	Yargelis Savigne	Cuba	3 July 2009	2009 Havana	
Shot put	19.13 m	Misleydis González	Cuba	5 July 2009	2009 Havana	
Discus throw	64.46 m	María Cristina Betancourt	Cuba	10 July 1981	1981 Santo Domingo	
Hammer throw	71.32 m	Arasay Thondike	Cuba	5 July 2009	2009 Havana	
Javelin throw	61.61 m (Current design)	Laverne Eve	Bahamas	27 June 1999	1999 Bridgetown	
Javelin throw	63.39 m (Old design)	Mayra Vila	Cuba	1985	1985 Nassau	
Heptathlon	6189 pts	Magalys García	Cuba	16 July 1995	1995 Guatemala City	
Heptathlon	100m H (wind) / High jump / Shot put / 200m (wind) / Long jump (wind) / Javelin / 800m; 13.18 / 1.72 m / 13.17 m / 23.70 / 5.82 m / 51.04 m / 2:22.59					
10,000 m walk (track)	45:52.32	Cristina López	El Salvador	July 2005	2005 Nassau	
10 km walk (road)	45:47	Maria del Rosario Sanchez	Mexico	20 July 2001	2001 Guatemala City	
4 × 100 m relay	43.06	Tamicka Clarke; Debbie Ferguson; Christine Amertil; Shandria Brown	Bahamas	5 July 2003	2003 Saint George's	
4 × 400 m relay	3:27.36	Revolie Campbell; Winsome Cole; Berenley Grant; Inez Turner	Jamaica	1 August 1993	1993 Cali	

Key:
^{WR} World record	^{CACR} Central American and Caribbean record	^{NR} National record	^{PB} Athlete's personal best

== Records in defunct events ==
=== Men's events ===
Event	Record	Name	Nation	Date	Venue	Ref.
30 km (road)	1:26:24 A	Mario Cuevas	Mexico	1979	1979 Guadalajara	
Marathon	2:23:15	Radamés González	Cuba	1981	1981 Santo Domingo	
10,000 m walk (track)	47:20.2	Lucas Lara	Cuba	1971	1971 Kingston	
50 km walk (road)	4:21:01	Rolando Hernández	Cuba	1983	1983 Havana	
Pentathlon	3440 A	Francisco Mena	Cuba	1967	1967 Xalapa	

=== Women's events ===
Event	Record	Name	Nation	Date	Venue	Ref.
3000 m	9:28.02 A	María Luisa Servín	Mexico	1991	1991 Xalapa	
80 m hurdles	11.6 A	Marlene Elejalde	Cuba	1967	1967 Xalapa	
200 m hurdles	28.0 (−3.9 m/s)	Lourdes Jones	Cuba	1971	1971 Kingston	
Pentathlon	4341 pts	Marlene Elejalde	Cuba	1971	1971 Kingston	

A = affected by altitude
