= Jamele Mason =

Puerto Rican hurdler

Personal information
- Born: October 19, 1989 (age 35) Houston, Texas

Sport
- Country: Puerto Rico
- Sport: Athletics
- Event: 400m Hurdles

Jamele Mason (born October 19, 1989) is a Puerto Rican hurdler. In 2012 he was the NCAA runner up in the 400 meter hurdles and ranked within the top 20 in the world. At the 2012 Summer Olympics, he competed in the Men's 400 meters hurdles. He attended Texas Tech University Lubbock, Texas, where he graduated magna cum laude with a degree in Corporate & Organizational Communications. Mason is the school record holder in the 400 meter hurdles being the only person in school history to run faster than 49 seconds. Mason's personal best is 48.89 which he ran at the 2012 NCAA championships. He was a member of the club Texas Tech Red Raiders.

== Competition record ==
Year	Competition	Venue	Position	Event	Notes
Representing Puerto Rico
2010	Central American and Caribbean Games	Mayagüez, Puerto Rico	–	400 m hurdles	DNF
2010	Central American and Caribbean Games	Mayagüez, Puerto Rico	5th	4 × 400 m relay	3:04.98
2011	Central American and Caribbean Championships	Mayagüez, Puerto Rico	5th	400 m hurdles	50.28
2011	Central American and Caribbean Championships	Mayagüez, Puerto Rico	7th	4 × 400 m relay	3:05.76
2011	World Championships	Daegu, South Korea	25th (h)	400 m hurdles	49.98
2012	NCAA Championships	Des Moines, Iowa	2nd (f)	400 m hurdles	48.89
2012	Olympic Games	London, United Kingdom	24th (h)	400 m hurdles	49.89
2013	Central American and Caribbean Championships	Morelia, Mexico	6th	400 m hurdles	50.65
