= Iván Darío González =

Colombian runner (born 1987)

Personal information
- Full name: Iván Darío González González
- Born: August 14, 1987 (age 38) Bogotá, Colombia
- Height: 1.70 m (5 ft 7 in)
- Weight: 69 kg (152 lb)

Sport
- Sport: Athletics
- Events: 1500 metres; 5000 metres; 10,000 metres; Half marathon; Marathon
Medal record
Representing Colombia
Men's athletics
Event	1st	2nd	3rd
CAC Games	0	2	2
South American Games	1	0	0
South American Championships	0	0	1
South American Cross Country Championships	0	0	1
Bolivarian Games	0	0	1
Total	1	2	5
Central American and Caribbean Games
Silver medal – second place	2014 Veracruz	5000 m
Silver medal – second place	2023 San Salvador	10,000 m
Bronze medal – third place	2014 Veracruz	10,000 m
Bronze medal – third place	2018 Barranquilla	10,000 m
South American Games
Gold medal – first place	2018 Cochabamba	10,000 m
South American Championships
Bronze medal – third place	2017 Asunción	5000 m
South American Cross Country Championships
Bronze medal – third place	2011 Asunción	12 km
Bolivarian Games
Bronze medal – third place	2022 Valledupar	5000 m

Iván Darío González González (born 14 August 1987) is a Colombian middle- and long-distance runner. He won a gold medal in the 10,000 metres at the 2018 South American Games.

He represented Colombia at the 2020 Summer Olympics.

== International competitions ==
Year	Competition	Venue	Position	Event	Notes
Representing Colombia
2011	South American Championships	Buenos Aires, Argentina	6th	1500 m	3:48.90
2011	Central American and Caribbean Championships	Mayagüez, Puerto Rico	6th	1500 m	3:48.47
2011	Central American and Caribbean Championships	Mayagüez, Puerto Rico	5th	5000 m	14:36.21
2012	Ibero-American Championships	Barquisimeto, Venezuela	13th	1500 m	3:56.88
2012	Ibero-American Championships	Barquisimeto, Venezuela	5th	3000 m	8:17.41
2014	Ibero-American Championships	São Paulo, Brazil	7th	1500 m	3:47.91
2014	Ibero-American Championships	São Paulo, Brazil	8th	3000 m	8:12.51
2014	Central American and Caribbean Games	Xalapa, Mexico	2nd	5000 m	14:25.16
2014	Central American and Caribbean Games	Xalapa, Mexico	3rd	10,000 m	29:41.31
2015	South American Championships	Lima, Peru	9th	5000 m	14:20.04
2016	Ibero-American Championships	Rio de Janeiro, Brazil	6th	3000 m	8:08.39
2016	Ibero-American Championships	Rio de Janeiro, Brazil	9th	5000 m	14:50.36
2017	South American Championships	Asunción, Paraguay	3rd	5000 m	14:15.76
2017	South American Championships	Asunción, Paraguay	—N/a	10,000 m	DNF
2017	Bolivarian Games	Santa Marta, Colombia	7th	5000 m	14:22.67
2018	South American Games	Cochabamba, Bolivia	5th	5000 m	15:14.69
2018	South American Games	Cochabamba, Bolivia	1st	10,000 m	30:25.10
2018	Central American and Caribbean Games	Barranquilla, Colombia	4th	5000 m	14:12.96
2018	Central American and Caribbean Games	Barranquilla, Colombia	3rd	10,000 m	30:15.23
2019	South American Championships	Lima, Peru	5th	5000 m	13:59.31
2019	Pan American Games	Lima, Peru	12th	5000 m	14:10.82
2019	Pan American Games	Lima, Peru	7th	10,000 m	28:39.15
2021	Olympic Games	Sapporo, Japan	—N/a	Marathon	DNF
2022	Bolivarian Games	Valledupar, Colombia	3rd	5000 m	14:35.70
2022	Bolivarian Games	Valledupar, Colombia	5th	10,000 m	30:08.56
2023	Central American and Caribbean Games	San Salvador, El Salvador	2nd	10,000 m	29:40.71
2023	Pan American Games	Santiago, Chile	10th	10,000 m	30:13.81
2026	Central American and Caribbean Games	Santo Domingo, Dominican Republic	5th	10,000 m	30:11.38
2026	Central American and Caribbean Games	Santo Domingo, Dominican Republic	5th	Half marathon	1:06:31

== Personal bests ==
Outdoor

- 1500 metres – 3:43.60 (Santander de Quilichao 2012)
- 3000 metres – 8:05.60 (Belém 2014)
- 5000 metres – 13:33.55 (Torrance 2019)
- 10,000 metres – 28:05.29 (Walnut 2022)
- 10 kilometres – 29:30 (Cali 2024)
- 15 kilometres – 47:01 (Bogotá 2019)
- Half marathon – 1:01:38 (Lisboa 2025)
- Marathon – 2:11:07 (Valencia 2020)
