= Joel Redhead =

Grenadian sprinter

Personal information
- Full name: Joel Michael Redhead
- Born: 3 July 1986 (age 40) Gouyave, Grenada
- Height: 1.87 m (6 ft 2 in)
- Weight: 60 kg (130 lb)

Sport
- Country: Grenada
- Sport: Athletics
- Event: Sprint
- Updated on 3 February 2017

Joel Redhead (born 3 July 1986) is a Grenadian sprinter. At the 2012 Summer Olympics, he competed in the Men's 200 metres. He came in eighth in the third heat and was therefore eliminated.

Redhead competed for the Bethune–Cookman Wildcats track and field team in the NCAA.

== Personal bests ==
=== Outdoor ===
- 100 m: 10.43 s (wind: -1.0 m/s) – New York City, United States, 16 May 2013
- 200 m: 20.49 s (wind: -0.2 m/s) – Fayetteville, United States, 11 June 2009
- 400 m: 46.20 s – Clermont, United States, 11 June 2011

=== Indoor ===
- 60 m: 6.85 s – New York City, United States, 18 January 2014
- 200 m: 20.91 s – Boston, United States, 8 February 2014
- 400 m: 47.55 s – New York City, United States, 29 February 2008

== International competitions ==
Year	Competition	Venue	Position	Event	Notes
Representing Grenada
2009	World Championships	Berlin, Germany	45th (h)	200 m	21.37 (wind: +0.2 m/s)
2011	Central American and Caribbean Championships	Mayagüez, Puerto Rico	6th	200 metres	21.23 (wind: +1.1 m/s)
2011	Central American and Caribbean Championships	Mayagüez, Puerto Rico	5th	4 × 400 m relay	3:04.27
2011	Pan American Games	Guadalajara, Mexico	25th (h)	200 m	21.60 A (wind: +1.2 m/s)
2012	Olympic Games	London, United Kingdom	8th (h)	200 m	21.22 (wind: +1.2 m/s)
2013	Central American and Caribbean Championships	Morelia, Mexico	8th (h)	200 m	20.99 A (wind: +0.3 m/s)
2014	Commonwealth Games	Glasgow, United Kingdom	6th (sf)	200 m	20.99 (wind: +0.3 m/s)
2014	Central American and Caribbean Games	Xalapa, Mexico	7th (sf)	200m	21.66 A (wind: -0.2 m/s)
2016
2016	NGC/SAGICOR/NAAA National Open Championships	Port of Spain, Trinidad and Tobago	2nd	4 × 400 m relay	3:10.97
2016	OECS Track & Field Championships	Tortola, British Virgin Islands	2nd	4 × 400 m relay	3:09.74
