= Janelle Redhead =

Grenadian sprinter

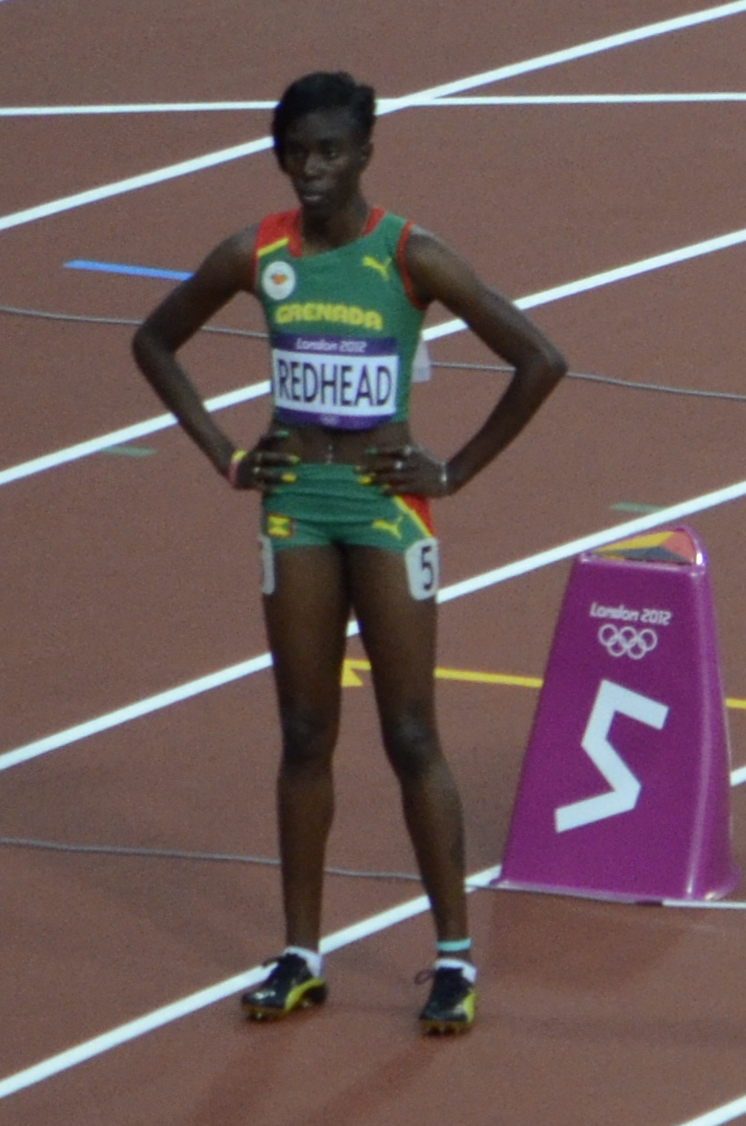
- Janelle Redhead at the 2012 Olympics

Personal information
- Born: 27 December 1989 (age 36)
- Height: 1.62 m (5 ft 4 in)
- Weight: 56 kg (123 lb)

Sport
- Country: Grenada
- Sport: Athletics
- Event: 200 metres

Achievements and titles
- National finals: Grenadian
- Personal best(s): 100 metres - 11.50s 200 metres - 22.91s
- Updated on 22 July 2012

Janelle Redhead (born 27 December 1989) in Gouyave, Saint John, is a Grenadian sprinter who specialises in the 200 metres.

She won the bronze medal at the 2008 World Junior Championships.

Her personal best times are 11.65 seconds in the 100 metres and 22.91 seconds in the 200 metres,

Janelle was a member of Grenada's track team for the 13th IAAF World Championships in Athletics in Daegu, South Korea, 27 August – 4 September 2011. She was a semi-finalist in the Women's 200m dash. Previously, she attended South Plains College in Texas where she was a member of the school's record 4x100 and 4 × 400 m relays teams at the National Junior College Athletic Association (NJCAA). She is currently a student/athlete at Wayland Baptist University in Texas. Her brother Joel has also represented Grenada at the Olympics.

She competed at the 2012 Summer Olympics in the 200 m reaching the semifinal.
