= Sandra López =

Mexican long-distance runner

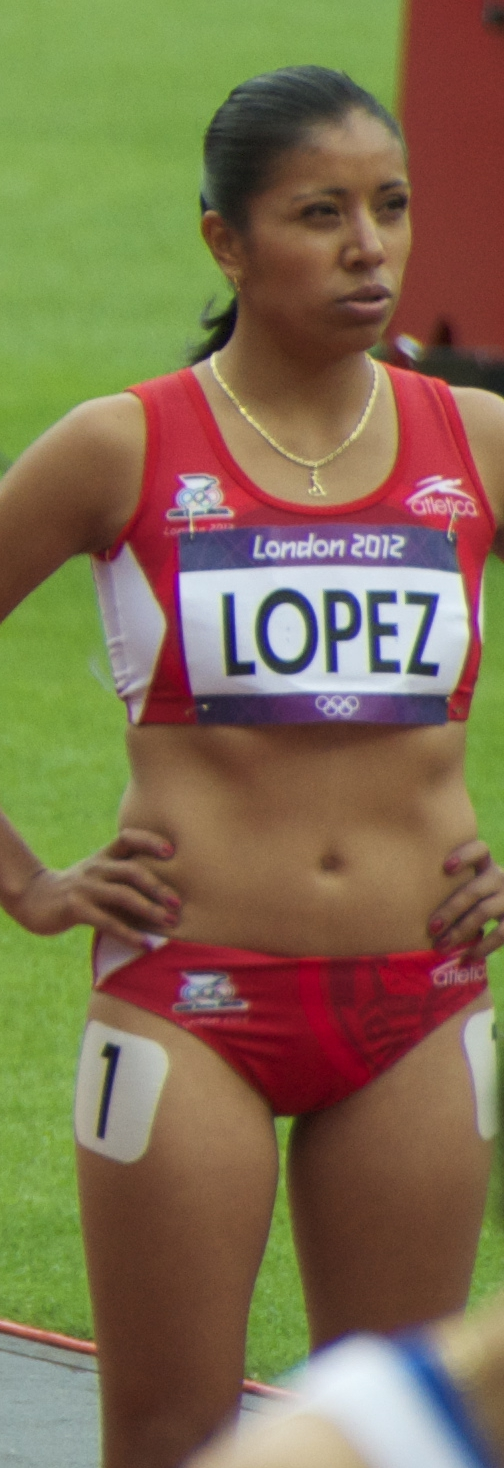
- Sandra López at the 2012 Summer Olympics

Personal information
- Full name: Sandra López Reyes
- Born: 16 April 1984 (age 42) Tlaxcala, Mexico
- Height: 1.54 m (5 ft 1 in)
- Weight: 47 kg (104 lb)

Sport
- Country: Mexico
- Sport: Athletics
- Events: Middle and Long-distance running
Medal record
Representing Mexico
Central American and Caribbean Games
Silver medal – second place	2014 Xalapa	5000m
Bronze medal – third place	2010 Mayagüez	3000m steeplechase
- Updated on 1 January 2015

Sandra López Reyes (born 16 April 1984) is a Mexican long-distance runner. At the 2012 Summer Olympics, she competed in the Women's 5000 metres, finishing 33rd overall in Round 1, failing to qualify for the final.

== Personal bests ==
Event	Result	Venue	Date
1500 m	4:19.10 min	Palo Alto, United States	6 April 2012
5000 m	15:28.71 min	Palo Alto, United States	1 May 2011
3000 m steeplechase	10:03.85 min	Walnut, United States	14 April 2011

== Achievements ==
Year	Competition	Venue	Position	Event	Notes
Representing Mexico
2006	NACAC Under-23 Championships	Santo Domingo, Dominican Republic	4th	3000m steeplechase	10:57.90
2007	NACAC Championships	San Salvador, El Salvador	2nd	3000m steeplechase	11:04.79
2010	Central American and Caribbean Games	Mayagüez, Puerto Rico	3rd	3000m steeplechase	10:18.88
2011	Central American and Caribbean Championships	Mayagüez, Puerto Rico	1st	1500m	4:22.65
2011	Central American and Caribbean Championships	Mayagüez, Puerto Rico	2nd	5000m	16:06.83
2011	Pan American Games	Guadalajara, Mexico	4th	5000m	16:47.19 A
2011	Pan American Games	Guadalajara, Mexico	6th	3000m steeplechase	10:34.90 A
2012	Ibero-American Championships	Barquisimeto, Venezuela	3rd	1500 m	4:21.00
2012	Ibero-American Championships	Barquisimeto, Venezuela	1st	5000 m	16:10.77
2012	Olympic Games	London, United Kingdom	33rd (h)	5000 m	15:55.16
2014	Ibero-American Championships	São Paulo, Brazil	4th	5000 m	16:05.51
2014	Pan American Sports Festival	Mexico City, Mexico	4th	5000m	17:16.24 A
2014	Central American and Caribbean Games	Xalapa, Mexico	2nd	5000m	16:13.23 A
