= Athletics at the 2011 Pan American Games – Men's 10,000 metres =

Men's 10,00 metres at the 2011 Pan American Games
- Venue: Telmex Athletics Stadium
- Dates: October 27
- Competitors: 13 from 8 nations

Medalists
| Gold medal | Marilson Santos | Brazil |
| Silver medal | Juan Romero | Mexico |
| Bronze medal | Giovani dos Santos | Brazil |

The men's 10,000 metres sprint competition of the athletics events at the 2011 Pan American Games took place on the 27th of October at the Telmex Athletics Stadium. The defending Pan American Games champion was José David Galván of Mexico.

== Records ==
Prior to this competition, the existing world and Pan American Games records were as follows:

| World record | Kenenisa Bekele (ETH) | 26:17.53 | Brussels, Belgium | August 26, 2005 |
| Pan American Games record | José David Galván (MEX) | 28:08.74 | Rio de Janeiro, Brazil | July 27, 2007 |

== Qualification ==
Each National Olympic Committee (NOC) was able to enter one athlete regardless if they had met the qualification standard. To enter two entrants both athletes had to have met the minimum standard (29:50.0) in the qualifying period (January 1, 2010 to September 14, 2011).

== Schedule ==
| Date | Time | Round |
|---|---|---|
| October 27, 2011 | 16:00 | Final |

== Results ==
All times shown are in seconds.

| KEY: | q | Fastest non-qualifiers | Q | Qualified | NR | National record | PB | Personal best | SB | Seasonal best | DQ | Disqualified |

=== Final ===
Held on October 26.

| Rank | Name | Nationality | Time | Notes |
|---|---|---|---|---|
| 1st place, gold medalist(s) | Marilson Santos | Brazil | 29:00.64 | |
| 2nd place, silver medalist(s) | Juan Romero | Mexico | 29:41.00 | |
| 3rd place, bronze medalist(s) | Giovani dos Santos | Brazil | 29:51.71 | |
| 4 | James Strang | United States | 29:51.93 | |
| 5 | Ryan Vail | United States | 29:52.04 | |
| 6 | Miguel Barzola | Argentina | 30:12.82 | |
| 7 | Raul Machahuay | Peru | 30:55.05 | |
| 8 | John Tello | Colombia | 31:04.32 | |
| 9 | Julio Perez | Mexico | 31:48.49 | |
| 10 | Santos Pirir | Guatemala | 32:30.64 | |
| | Jhon Cusi | Peru | DNF | |
| | Javier Guarin | Colombia | DNF | |
| | Byron Piedra | Ecuador | DNF | |
