= Stephen Sáenz =

Mexican shot putter (born 1990)

Personal information
- Full name: Stephen Christopher Sáenz Villarreal
- Born: 23 August 1990 (age 35) Mcallen, Texas, U.S.
- Height: 1.83 m (6 ft 0 in)
- Weight: 116 kg (256 lb)

Sport
- Country: Mexico
- Sport: Athletics
- Event: Shot put
Medal record
Representing Mexico
Central American and Caribbean Games
Silver medal – second place	2014 Xalapa	Shot put
- Updated on 27 December 2014

Stephen Christopher Saenz Villarreal (born 23 August 1990) is a Mexican athlete. Although born in the United States, he represents the Athletics Association of the State of Sonora (Asociación de Atletismo del Estado de Sonora). He competed for Mexico in shot put at the 2012 Summer Olympics.

Saenz competed for the Auburn Tigers track and field team in the NCAA. He was also an assistant track coach at Skyline High School in Ann Arbor, Michigan.

== Personal bests ==
Event	Result	Venue	Date
Outdoor
Shot put	20.35 m	La Jolla, United States	26 April 2014
Discus throw	55.92 m	Starkville, United States	26 March 2011
Indoor
Shot put	20.08 m	Nampa, United States	9 March 2012

== Achievements ==
Year	Competition	Venue	Position	Event	Notes
Representing Mexico
2011	Central American and Caribbean Championships	Mayagüez, Puerto Rico	2nd	Shot put	18.66 m
2011	Central American and Caribbean Championships	Mayagüez, Puerto Rico	6th	Discus throw	51.52 m
2011	Pan American Games	Guadalajara, Mexico	4th	Shot put	19.54 m A
2012	NACAC Under-23 Championships	Irapuato, Mexico	2nd	Shot put	19.31 m A
2012	Olympic Games	London, United Kingdom	31st (q)	Shot put	18.65 m
2014	Ibero-American Championships	São Paulo, Brazil	3rd	Shot put	18.62 m
2014	Pan American Sports Festival	Mexico City, Mexico	3rd	Shot put	19.91 m A
2014	Central American and Caribbean Games	Xalapa, Mexico	2nd	Shot put	19.27 m A
2015	Pan American Games	Toronto, Canada	8th	Shot put	18.58 m
