= Giovani dos Santos (athlete) =

Brazilian long-distance runner

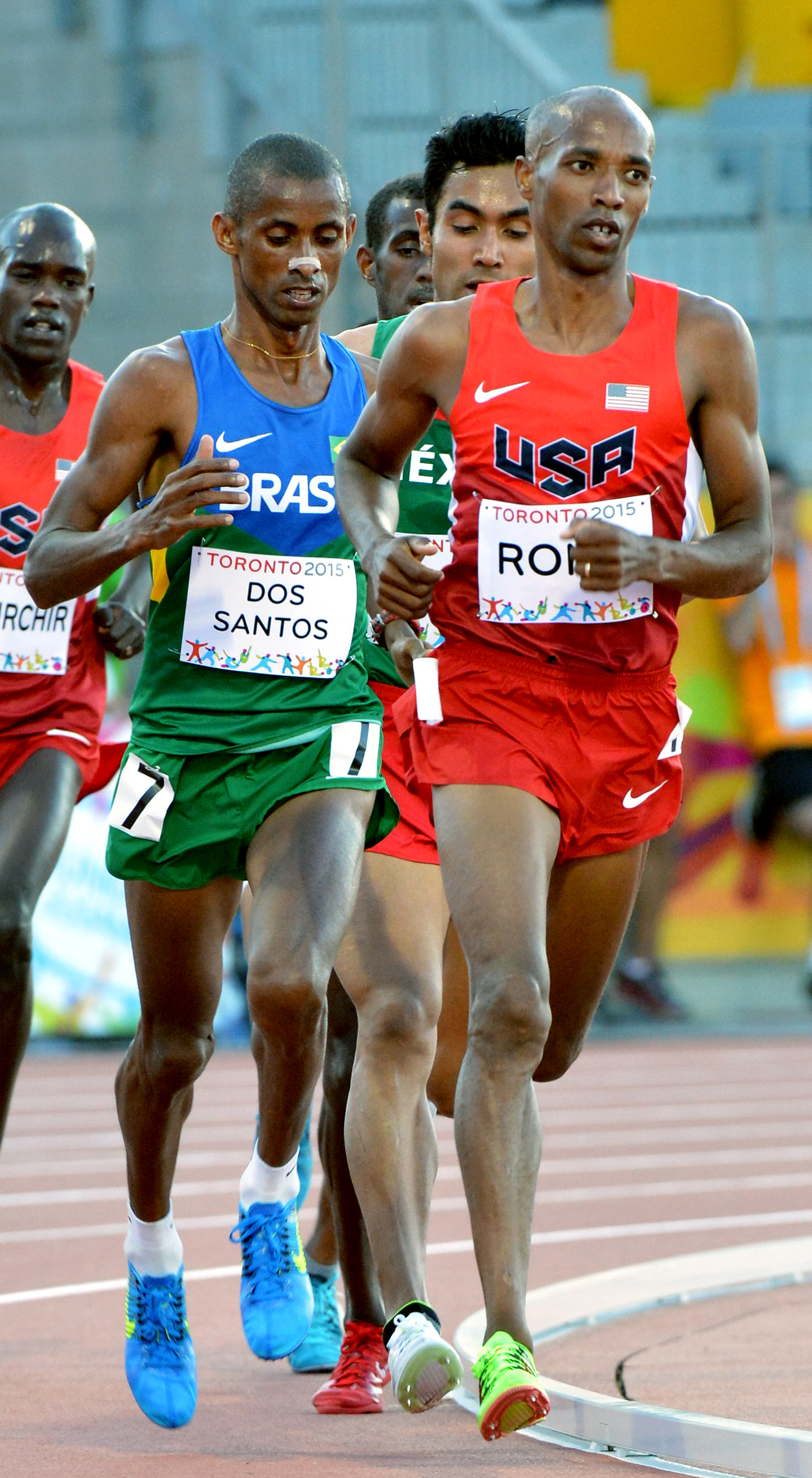
- Dos Santos (left) at the 2015 Pan American Games

Personal information
- Born: 1 July 1981 (age 45)

Sport
- Sport: Athletics
- Events: 10,000 m, half marathon, marathon

Achievements and titles
- Personal bests: 10,000 m – 28:20.9 (2013); HM – 1:01:37 (2013); Mar – 2:14:41 (2016)
Medal record
Representing Brazil
Pan American Games
Bronze medal – third place	2011 Guadalajara	10,000 m

Giovani dos Santos (born 1 July 1981) is a Brazilian long-distance runner who won a bronze medal in the 10,000 m event at the 2011 Pan American Games.
