= Lester Ryan (athlete) =

Montserratian sprinter

Personal information
- Nationality: Montserrat
- Born: 8 January 1993 (age 33) Plymouth, Montserrat

Sport
- Country: Montserrat
- Sport: Athletics
- Sprint: 100m 200m 4x100m

Achievements and titles
- Personal best(s): 60 m: 6.90 s (2018); 100 m: 10.75 s (2010); 200 m: 22.01 s (2009)

Lester Ryan (born January 8, 1993) is a Montserratian sprinter who specializes in the 100 metres, 200 metres and 4 x 100 metres relay. He represented Montserrat in the 100 metres, 200 metres and 4 x 100 metres relay at the 2014 Commonwealth Games in Glasgow, Scotland.
