= Juan Carlos Romero (athlete) =

Mexican long-distance runner

Personal information
- Full name: Juan Carlos Romero Bernal
- Nickname: El Garras
- Born: 15 December 1977 (age 48) Zacatecas, Mexico
- Height: 1.77 m (5 ft 10 in)
- Weight: 62 kg (137 lb)

Sport
- Country: Mexico
- Sport: Athletics
- Events: Long-distance and Cross country running
Medal record
Men's Athletics
Representing Mexico
CAC Championships
Gold medal – first place	2013 Morelia	10,000 m
- Updated on 17 December 2014

Juan Carlos Romero Bernal (born 15 December 1977) is a Mexican long-distance runner who competed in the 2008 Summer Olympics.

== Personal bests ==
=== Outdoor ===
- 1500 m: 3:47.41 min – Monterrey, Mexico, 12 March 2010
- 3000m: 8:14.68 min – Ponce, Puerto Rico, 27 May 2006
- 5000m: 13:29.40 min – Walnut, United States, 15 April 2011
- 10,000m: 27:47.46 min – Stanford, United States, 4 May 2008
- Half marathon: 1:01:48 hrs – Birmingham, United Kingdom, 11 October 2009
- Marathon: 2:14:47 hrs – Torreón, Mexico, 4 March 2012

== Competition record ==
Year	Competition	Venue	Position	Event	Notes
Representing Mexico
2005	Central American and Caribbean Championships	Nassau, Bahamas	2nd	5000 m	14:36.18
2005	Central American and Caribbean Championships	Nassau, Bahamas	2nd	10,000 m	30:41.87
2006	Ibero-American Championships	Ponce, Puerto Rico	5th	3000 m	8:14.68
2006	Ibero-American Championships	Ponce, Puerto Rico	4th	5000 m	14:15.57
2006	Central American and Caribbean Games	Cartagena, Colombia	7th	10,000 m	30:44.23
2006	World Road Running Championships	Debrecen, Hungary	52nd	20 km	1:01:57
2007	World Road Running Championships	Udine, Italy	42nd	Half marathon	1:03:20
2008	Ibero-American Championships	Iquique, Chile	3rd	5000 m	13:51.25
2008	Olympic Games	Beijing, China	29th	10,000 m	28:26.57
2009	World Championships	Berlin, Germany	14th	10,000 m	28:09.78
2009	World Half Marathon Championships	Birmingham, United Kingdom	9th	Half marathon	1:01:48
2010	Central American and Caribbean Games	Mayagüez, Puerto Rico	2nd	5000 m	13:56.17
2010	Central American and Caribbean Games	Mayagüez, Puerto Rico	1st	10,000 m	29:13.71
2011	World Cross Country Championships	Punta Umbría, Spain	27th	12 km	35:42
2011	Central American and Caribbean Championships	Mayagüez, Puerto Rico	1st	10,000 m	28:54.06
2011	World Championships	Daegu, South Korea	16th	10,000 m	29:38.38
2011	Pan American Games	Guadalajara, Mexico	4th	5000 m	14:16.13
2011	Pan American Games	Guadalajara, Mexico	2nd	10,000 m	29:41.00
2013	Central American and Caribbean Championships	Morelia, Mexico	1st	10,000 m	30:11.84
2014	World Half Marathon Championships	Copenhagen, Denmark	52nd	Half marathon	1:03:10
2014	Pan American Sports Festival	Mexico City, Mexico	3rd	5000m	14:31.65 A
2014	Central American and Caribbean Games	Xalapa, Mexico	2nd	10,000m	29:28.32 A
