= Jura Levy =

Jamaican sprinter (born 1990)

Personal information
- Nationality: Jamaican
- Born: 4 November 1990 (age 35)
- Height: 1.52 m (5 ft 0 in)
- Weight: 56 kg (123 lb)

Sport
- Sport: Running
- Events: 100 metres, 200 metres
Medal record
Women's athletics
Representing Jamaica
World Championships
Silver medal – second place	2011 Daegu	4 × 100 m relay
Bronze medal – third place	2017 London	4 × 100 m relay
World Athletics Relays
Gold medal – first place	2017 Nassau	4 × 200 m relay
NACAC Championships
Silver medal – second place	2018 Toronto	4 × 100 m relay
CAC Championships
Gold medal – first place	2018 Barranquilla	4 × 100 m relay
Silver medal – second place	2026 Santo Domingo	Mixed 4×100m relay
Silver medal – second place	2011 Mayagüez	100 m
Silver medal – second place	2011 Mayagüez	4 × 100 m relay
World Junior Championships
Silver medal – second place	2008 Bydgoszcz	4 × 100 m relay
CARIFTA Games (Junior)
Gold medal – first place	2009 Vieux Fort	200 m
Gold medal – first place	2009 Vieux Fort	4 × 100 m relay
Silver medal – second place	2008 Basseterre	4 × 100 m relay
Silver medal – second place	2009 Vieux Fort	100 m
Bronze medal – third place	2008 Basseterre	200 m
World Youth Championships
Silver medal – second place	2007 Ostrava	Medley relay
CARIFTA Games (Youth)
Gold medal – first place	2006 Les Abymes	4 × 100 m relay

Jura Lanconia Levy (born 4 November 1990) is a Jamaican sprinter who specializes in the 100 metres and 200 metres. Her personal bests for the events are 11.10 seconds and 22.76 seconds, respectively.

== Biography ==
She attended South Plains College and won four gold medals at the 2010 NJCAA championships, taking the 100 and 200 m titles and two relay titles. She has won a number of medals at the CARIFTA Games including a relay gold in 2006, 200 m bronze in 2008 and a sprints gold/silver double at the 2009 CARIFTA Games.

== Career ==
At international level, she was a finalist in both the individual sprints at the 2007 World Youth Championships in Athletics and reached the 200 m final at the 2008 World Junior Championships in Athletics. Her last appearance in the age group categories came at the 2009 Pan American Junior Athletics Championships, where she was a double sprints bronze medallist and took a silver medal in the 4 × 100 m relay.

Levy began competing at the senior level in 2011. At the 2011 Central American and Caribbean Championships in Athletics in July she won silver medals over 100 m in the individual and relay competitions. She was selected to represent Jamaica in the 100 m at the 2011 World Championships in Athletics in Daegu and reached the semi-finals of the event. She ran in the heat stage of the women's relay and although she did not race in the final, she received a world silver medal as part of the team.

== Personal bests ==
Event	Time	Venue	Date
100 m	11.06 (0.3 m/s)	Kingston, Jamaica	24 June 2017
200 m	22.76 (1.8 m/s)	Hutchinson, Kansas	25 May 2011
400 m	53.58	Lubbock, Texas	2 April 2011

== Achievements ==
Year	Competition	Venue	Position	Event	Notes
Representing Jamaica
2005	CARIFTA Games (U-17)	Bacolet, Trinidad and Tobago	5th	200 m	24.38 (-1.0 m/s)
2006	CARIFTA Games (U-17)	Les Abymes, Guadeloupe	4th	200 m	24.39 (-0.6 m/s)
2006	CARIFTA Games (U-17)	Les Abymes, Guadeloupe	5th	400 m	57.31
2006	CARIFTA Games (U-17)	Les Abymes, Guadeloupe	1st	4 × 100 m relay	45.66
2007	World Youth Championships	Ostrava, Czech Republic	7th (sf)	100 m	12.01 (0.8 m/s)
2007	World Youth Championships	Ostrava, Czech Republic	4th (sf)	200 m	24.28 (-1.5 m/s)
2007	World Youth Championships	Ostrava, Czech Republic	2nd	Medley relay (100 m + 200 m + 300 m + 400 m)	2:06.77
2008	CARIFTA Games (U-20)	Basseterre, Saint Kitts and Nevis	4th	100 m	11.52 w (2.5 m/s)
2008	CARIFTA Games (U-20)	Basseterre, Saint Kitts and Nevis	3rd	200 m	23.28 (1.4 m/s)
2008	CARIFTA Games (U-20)	Basseterre, Saint Kitts and Nevis	2nd	4 × 100 m relay	44.90
2008	World Junior Championships	Bydgoszcz, Poland	8th	200 m	23.95 (-0.9 m/s)
2008	World Junior Championships	Bydgoszcz, Poland	2nd	4 × 100 m relay	43.98
2009	CARIFTA Games (U-20)	Vieux Fort, Saint Lucia	2nd	100 m	11.33 w (2.5 m/s)
2009	CARIFTA Games (U-20)	Vieux Fort, Saint Lucia	1st	200 m	23.20 (1.5 m/s)
2009	CARIFTA Games (U-20)	Vieux Fort, Saint Lucia	1st	4 × 100 m relay	45.04
2017	World Championships	London, United Kingdom	15th (sf)	100 m	11.19
2017	World Championships	London, United Kingdom	3rd	4 × 100 m relay	42.19
2018	Central American and Caribbean Games	Barranquilla, Colombia	5th	100 m	11.52
2018	Central American and Caribbean Games	Barranquilla, Colombia	1st	4 × 100 m relay	43.41
2018	NACAC Championships	Toronto, Canada	2nd	4 × 100 m relay	43.33
