= Jon Rankin =

American track and field runner

Personal information
- Nationality: American and Caymanian
- Born: 9 February 1982 (age 44) Spring Valley, San Diego, California, U.S.
- Height: 1.78 m (5 ft 10 in)
- Weight: 65.8 kg (145 lb)

Sport
- Country: Cayman Islands
- Sport: Track and field
- University team: UCLA Bruins
- Club: Nike Team Run LA
- Coached by: Joaquim Cruz
- Retired: 2012

Achievements and titles
- National finals: 2001 USA Track & Field Junior National Championships (1,500 m – 1st)
- Personal bests: 800m: 1:47.01; 1500m: 3:35.26; Mile: 3:54.24
Medal record
Men's athletics
Representing United States (until September 2009) Cayman Islands (since October 2009)
CAC Championships
Bronze medal – third place	2011 Mayagüez	1500 m

Jon Byron Rankin (born 9 February 1982) is an American born retired Caymanian middle and long-distance track and field runner. The highlight of his track and field career was winning the USA Junior Outdoor Track & Field Championships at 1500 metres and the 2007 Emsley Carr Mile in England. He is the CEO of Go Be More, who design apparel. He is also a copywriter working for various organisations and for himself.

== Early life and amateur career ==
Rankin graduated from Monte Vista High School in Spring Valley, California. He then went on to attend the University of California, Los Angeles (UCLA) where he studied for a Bachelor of Arts degree in English language. In 2004 he became UCLA's number one runner for the season and was an All-American. On 9 April 2005, he became then the 17th African American and 268th American overall to run a sub four-minute mile. He graduated from UCLA in 2005.

== Professional career ==
=== Athletics career ===
After graduating, he turned professional as a sponsored athlete with Nike. Rankin trained and raced throughout the US and Europe. On 11 August 2007 he won the Emsley Carr Mile in Manchester, England in a personal best time of 3:54.24, A year later in 2008, at the time of the United States Olympic Trials, he was diagnosed with focal segmental glomerulosclerosis (FSGS), although his official diagnosis didn't come about until the end of 2008. FSGS is estimated to occur in 2-3 persons per million, with males and African peoples at higher risk. Later in 2011, Rankin underwent an experimental stem cell surgery to reverse his disease.

Earlier, on 1 October 2009, Rankin decided to switch his allegiance to the Cayman Islands, "Jon is eligible to do this because both of his parents were born in the Cayman Islands," wrote his manager, Merhawi Keflezighi. He retired from professional competitive racing at the end of 2012. In 2015 Rankin was inducted into the National Black Distance Running Hall of Fame by the National Black Marathoners’ Association.

==== Personal bests ====
Distance	Time	Place	Date
800 metres	1:47.01	Indianapolis, USA	11 June 2008
1500 metres	3:35.26	Stockholm, Sweden	26 July 2005
One mile	3:54.24	Stretford, England	11 August 2007
5,000 metres	14:08.09	Los Angeles, USA	11 March 2011
10k	30:44	New York City, USA	15 May 2010
15k	47:53	Jacksonville, FL, USA	9 March 2013
Half marathon	1:08:59	Carlsbad, CA, USA	24 January 2010
Marathon	2:34:29	Sacramento, CA, USA	5 December 2010

All Information taken from World Athletics profile.

==== Competitions ====
Year	Competition	Venue	Position	Event
Representing United States
2001	USA Track & Field Junior National Championships	Sports Backers Stadium, Richmond, Virginia, USA	1st	1500 metres
2007	Emsley Carr Mile	Stretford Stadium, Manchester, England	1st	Mile
2008	United States Olympic Trials	Hayward Field, Eugene, Oregon, USA	6th	1500 metres
2009	Fifth Avenue Mile	Fifth Avenue, New York City, USA	13th	Mile
Representing Cayman Islands
2010	UAE Healthy Kidney 10K	New York City, USA	23rd	10,000 metres
2010	Commonwealth Games	Jawaharlal Nehru Stadium, Delhi, India	14th	800 metres
2010	Commonwealth Games	Jawaharlal Nehru Stadium, Delhi, India	17th	1500 metres
2011	IAAF World Cross Country Championships	Punta Umbría, Spain	98th	Cross country
2011	Central American and Caribbean Championships	Mayagüez Athletics Stadium, Mayagüez, Puerto Rico	3rd	1500 metres
2011	Pan American Games	Estadio de Béisbol Charros de Jalisco y Atletismo, Zapopan, Mexico	7th	800 metres
2011	Pan American Games	Estadio de Béisbol Charros de Jalisco y Atletismo, Zapopan, Mexico	4th	1500 metres
2012	UW (University of Washington) Invitational	Dempsey Indoor, Seattle, Washington, USA	5th	Mile
2012	Retired From Professional Athletics			
2013	Jacksonville River Run	Jacksonville, Florida, USA	49th	15,000 metres

=== Career outside of athletics ===
Since graduating, outside of athletics, Rankin has been a freelance senior copywriter, and since 2018 he has been the chief executive officer of both Go Be More and Catchy Content Co.

== See also ==
- List of Caymanian records in athletics
