= Ana Lúcia Barros =

Brazilian volleyball player (born 1965)

Personal information
- Full name: Ana Lúcia de Camargo Barros
- Nationality: Brazilian
- Born: 16 December 1965 (age 60)
- Height: 176 cm (69 in)
- Weight: 71 kg (157 lb)

National team
1986–1992	Brazil

Ana Lúcia de Camargo Barros (born 16 December 1965) is a Brazilian female volleyball player.

She was part of the Brazil women's national volleyball team at the 1988 Summer Olympics and 1992 Summer Olympics. She also competed at the 1986 FIVB Volleyball Women's World Championship.
