= Magnolia Howell =

Trinidadian sprinter and artist

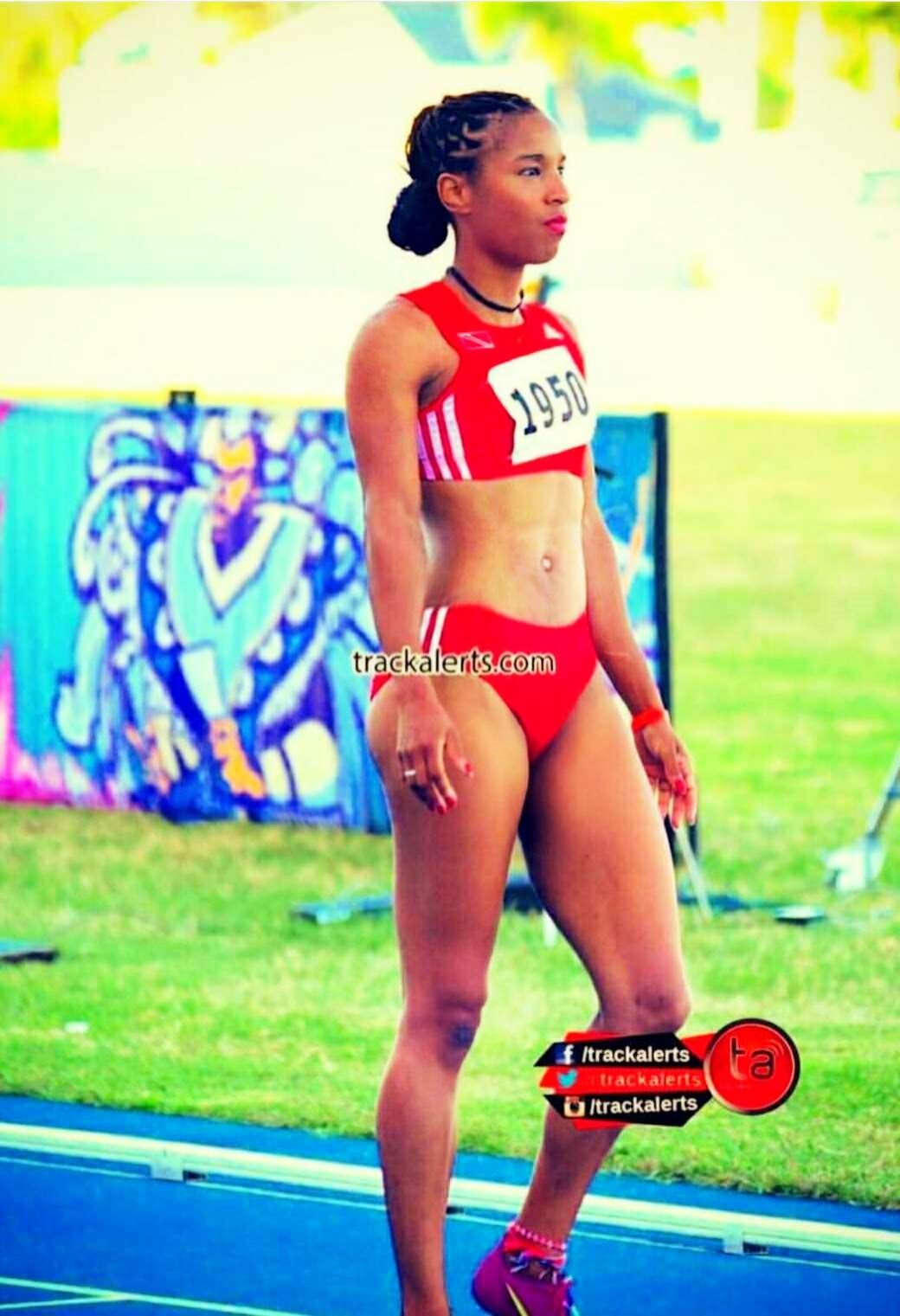

Personal information
- Nationality: Trinidad and Tobago
- Born: Sacramento, California
- Education: California State University, Long Beach, studying print journalism

Sport
- Sport: Athletics
- Events: 100 metres, 200 metres, 400 metres
- College team: Long Beach State 49ers
- Club: Team Bing; Nike, Inc.
- Turned pro: 2011
- Coached by: Bobby Kersee (2013); Darryl Woodson (2020)

Achievements and titles
- World finals: 2014 World Relays; • 4 × 400 m, 4th (B final); 2015 World Relays; • 4 × 400 m, 4th (B final)
- National finals: 2011 Trinidadian Champs; • 400 m, 2nd (silver); • 200 m, 4th; 2012 Trinidadian Champs; • 100 m, 6th; • 4 × 100 m, 1st (gold); 2013 Trinidadian Champs; • 400 m, 7th; • 200 m, 5th; 2015 Trinidadian Champs; • 200 m, 3rd (bronze)
- Personal bests: 100 m: 11.40 (+1.9) (2012); 200 m: 23.39 (+0.9) (2013); 400 m: 52.25 (2015)
Medal record
Women's athletics
Representing Trinidad and Tobago
Central American and Caribbean Champs
Gold medal – first place	2011 Mayagüez	4 × 100 m relay
Bronze medal – third place	2011 Mayagüez	4 × 400 m relay

Magnolia Howell is a former professional track and field sprinter and current writer and fine artist. Representing Trinidad and Tobago, she won the gold medal in the 4 × 400 metres at the 2011 Central American and Caribbean Championships.

== Biography ==
Born in Sacramento, California but raised in Guadalajara, Mexico, Howell started running at eight years old. She moved to Omaha, Nebraska and attended Westside High School, where she was a state champion in both the 100 m and 200 m.

In college she competed for the Long Beach State 49ers track and field team, setting a school record in the 4 × 100 metres while studying print journalism. After graduating, she began to focus more exclusively on running.

At the 2011 Central American and Caribbean Championships in Athletics, Howell competed in the 4 × 100 m, 4 × 400 m, and individual 200 m for Trinidad and Tobago. In the 200 m, Howell did not qualify for the finals, but she won the gold medal in the 4 × 100 m relay leading off for teammates Michelle-Lee Ahye, Ayanna Hutchinson, and Semoy Hackett. Howell was the only athlete from that team to also compete in the 4 × 400 m finals, where her team won the bronze medal.

At the 2012 NAAATT Trinidadian Olympic trials, Howell finished 6th in the 100 metres, narrowly missing an Olympic berth.

In 2014, Howell began to train at Drake Stadium under famed athletics and former Nike coach Bobby Kersee. Following her professional rise, she competed in the 2014 and 2015 IAAF World Relays, both times representing Trinidad and Tobago in the 4 × 400 m. At both championships, Howell's team finished 4th in the 'B' finals, posting an overall best mark of 3:33.21 at the 2014 edition.

Howell competed at the 2016 NAAATT Trials in the 400 m, but did not qualify for the 'A' final and missed out on another Olympic team spot. Following this setback, Howell took a year off from the sport and started an art company, Art On The Run, before moving to Austin, Texas to be coached by Darryl Woodson in preparation for the 2020 Olympic cycle. She stated that one of her goals was to break Janeil Bellille's Trinidadian record in the 400 m of 51.83 seconds.

After the COVID-19 pandemic of 2020 postponed the Olympics back one year, Howell retired from the sport and focused exclusively on writing and art. As an artist under the pen name Magnolia Lafleur, she has shown her work in Los Angeles-area galleries and has sold to international clients. As a journalist, she is a member of the Society of Professional Journalists and has worked for the Press-Telegram, the Grunion Gazette, the Long Beach Post, the Palisadian-Post, and the Orange County Register.

== Statistics ==
=== Personal bests ===
Event	Mark	Place	Competition	Venue	Date
100 metres	11.40 (+1.9 m/s)	3rd place, bronze medalist(s)	Tommy 'Tiny' Lister Classic	Los Angeles, California	7 April 2012
200 metres	23.39 (+0.9 m/s)	2rB	Oxy Invitational	Eagle Rock, California	4 May 2013
400 metres	52.25	1st place, gold medalist(s)	Oxy-Lu Last Chance Qualifier	Eagle Rock, California	12 May 2015
