= Athletics at the 2014 Central American and Caribbean Games =

Athletics at the XXII CAC Games
- Dates: November 23–30
- Host city: Veracruz, Mexico
- Venue: Heriberto Jara Corona Stadium
- Events: 47
- Participation: 417 athletes from 31 nations

The Athletics competition at the 2014 Central American and Caribbean Games was held in Veracruz, Mexico.

The tournament was held from 23 to 30 November at the Heriberto Jara Corona Stadium. Detailed reports and an appraisal of the results were given.

== Medal summary ==
=== Men's events ===
Event	Gold		Silver		Bronze	
100 m (w: +0.9 m/s)	Rolando Palacios; Honduras	10.27	Levi Cadogan; Barbados	10.27	Yaniel Carrero; Cuba	10.28
200 m (w: -1.8 m/s)	Roberto Skyers; Cuba	20.47	Reynier Mena; Cuba	20.54	José Carlos Herrera; Mexico	20.63
400 m	Raidel Acea; Cuba	45.36	Yoandys Lescay; Cuba	45.56	Alberth Bravo; Venezuela	45.82
800 m	Andy González; Cuba	1:45.73	Rafith Rodríguez; Colombia	1:45.74	Wesley Vázquez; Puerto Rico	1:46.05
1500 m	Andy González; Cuba	3:45.52	Pablo Solares; Mexico	3:45.62	Christopher Sandoval; Mexico	3:47.55
5000 m	Juan Luis Barrios; Mexico	14:15.98	Iván Darío González; Colombia	14:25.16	Mario Pacay; Guatemala	14:27.34
10,000 m	Juan Luis Barrios; Mexico	29:13.63	Juan Carlos Romero; Mexico	29:28.32	Iván Darío González; Colombia	29:41.31
110 m hurdles (w: +0.7 m/s)	Yordan Luis O'Farrill; Cuba	13.46	Jhoanis Portilla; Cuba	13.53	Greggmar Swift; Barbados	13.59
400 m hurdles	Omar Cisneros; Cuba	49.56	Eric Alejandro; Puerto Rico	50.05	Leslie Murray; U.S. Virgin Islands	50.21
3000 metres steeplechase	Marvin Blanco; Venezuela	8:43.76	José Peña; Venezuela	8:45.04	Luis Enrique Ibarra; Mexico	8:48.42
4 × 100 metres relay	Cuba; César Yadiel Ruiz; Reynier Mena; Yadier Luis; Yaniel Carrero	38.94	Dominican Republic; Gustavo Cuesta; Yoandry Andújar; Stanly del Carmen; Yancarlos Martínez	39.01	Venezuela; Alberto Aguilar; Dubeiker Cedeño; Álvaro Cassiani; Arturo Ramírez	39.22
4 × 400 metres relay	Cuba; William Collazo; Raidel Acea; Osmaidel Pellicier; Yoandys Lescay	3:00.70 GR	Venezuela; Alberto Aguilar; Alberth Bravo; José Meléndez; Freddy Mezones	3:01.80	Colombia; Bernardo Baloyes; Carlos Lemos; Diego Palomeque; Rafith Rodríguez	3:02.52
Marathon	Richer Pérez; Cuba	2:19:13	José Amado García; Guatemala	2:19:45	Daniel de Jesús Vargas; Mexico	2:20:27
20 km walk	Horacio Nava; Mexico	1:25:05	Éider Arévalo; Colombia	1:26:03	José Leonardo Montaña; Colombia	1:27:30
50 km walk	Erick Bernabé Barrondo; Guatemala	3:49:40 GR	Omar Zepeda; Mexico	3:52:45	Cristián David Berdeja; Mexico	3:53:39
High jump	Sergio Mestre; Cuba	2.26 m	Eure Yánez; Venezuela	2.24 m	Ryan Ingraham; Bahamas	2.24 m
Pole vault	Lázaro Borges; Cuba	5.30 m	Yankier Lara; Cuba	5.10 m	Raúl Alejandro Ríos; Mexico	5.00 m
Long jump	David Registe; Dominica	7.79 m (w: -0.2 m/s)	Muhammad Taqi Abdul-Halim; U.S. Virgin Islands	7.75 m (w: -0.6 m/s)	Yunior Díaz; Cuba	7.66 m (w: -0.9 m/s)
Triple jump	Ernesto Revé; Cuba	16.94 m (w: -0.1 m/s)	Lázaro Martínez; Cuba	16.91 m (w: -0.6 m/s)	Yordanys Durañona; Dominica	16.67 m (w: -0.4 m/s)
Shot put	Mario Cota; Mexico	19.30 m	Stephen Sáenz; Mexico	19.27 m	Raymond Brown; Jamaica	18.30 m
Discus	Jorge Yedián Fernández; Cuba	63.17 m	Mauricio Ortega; Colombia	60.69 m	Mario Cota; Mexico	58.21 m
Hammer	Roberto Janet; Cuba	74.11 m	Reinier Mejías; Cuba	71.81 m	Roberto Sawyers; Costa Rica	70.66 m
Javelin	Guillermo Martínez; Cuba	79.27 m	Juan José Méndez; Mexico	76.80 m	Osmany Laffita; Cuba	76.28 m
Decathlon	Yordanis García; Cuba	7854 pts	José Ángel Mendieta; Cuba	7517 pts	Roman Garibay; Mexico	7243 pts

=== Women's events ===
Event	Gold		Silver		Bronze	
100 m (w: +1.5 m/s)	Andrea Purica; Venezuela	11.29	Nediam Vargas; Venezuela	11.43	LaVerne Jones; U.S. Virgin Islands	11.54
200 m (w: -1.8 m/s)	Nercely Soto; Venezuela	23.14	María Alejandra Idrobo; Colombia	23.52	Allison Peter; U.S. Virgin Islands	23.54
400 m	Lisneidys Inés Veitía; Cuba	51.72	Daisiuramis Bonne; Cuba	52.49	Jennifer Padilla; Colombia	52.95
800 m	Rose Mary Almanza; Cuba	2:00.79	Cristina Guevara; Mexico	2:01.68	Gabriela Medina; Mexico	2:02.36
1500 m	Muriel Coneo; Colombia	4:14.84 GR	Cristina Guevara; Mexico	4:16.51	Adriana Muñoz; Cuba	4:20.50
5000 m	Brenda Flores; Mexico	16:02.64 GR	Sandra López; Mexico	16:13.23	Yudileyvis Castillo; Cuba	16:16.21
10,000 m	Brenda Flores; Mexico	35:54.44	Kathya García; Mexico	36:23.32	Yudileyvis Castillo; Cuba	36:29.04
100 m hurdles (w: -0.8 m/s)	Lina Marcela Flórez; Colombia	13.19	Brigitte Merlano; Colombia	13.19	Kierre Beckles; Barbados	13.47
400 m hurdles	Zudikey Rodríguez; Mexico	56.79	Magdalena Mendoza; Venezuela	57.67	Zurian Hechavarria; Cuba	57.74
3000 metres steeplechase	Ángela Figueroa; Colombia	10:05.25	Muriel Coneo; Colombia	10:07.94	Beverly Ramos; Puerto Rico	10:08.39
4 × 100 metres relay	Venezuela; Nediam Vargas; Andrea Purica; Nelsibeth Villalobos; Nercely Soto	43.53	Colombia; Lina Marcela Flórez; María Alejandra Idrobo; Darlenys Obregón; Eliecith Palacios	44.02	Cuba; Geylis Montes; Arialis Gandulla; Greter Guillén; Dulaimi Debora Odelin	44.19
4 × 400 metres relay	Cuba; Lisneidys Inés Veitía; Gilda Isbely Casanova; Yameisi Borlot; Daisiuramis Bonne	3:29.69	Mexico; Natali Brito; Gabriela Medina; Mariel Espinosa; Zudikey Rodríguez	3:33.16	Colombia; Norma González; Melisa Torres; Jennifer Padilla; Evelis Aguilar	3:34.14
Marathon	Margarita Hernández; Mexico	2:41:16 GR	Dailín Belmonte; Cuba	2:42:01	Zuleima Amaya; Venezuela	2:42:27
20 kilometres race walk	Mirna Ortiz; Guatemala	1:35:43 GR	Sandra Arenas; Colombia	1:36:29	Ingrid Hernández; Colombia	1:37:11
High jump	Levern Spencer; Saint Lucia	1.89 m	Priscilla Frederick; Antigua and Barbuda	1.83 m	Kashany Ríos; Panama	1.80 m
Pole vault	Yarisley Silva; Cuba	4.60 m GR	Diamara Planell; Puerto Rico	4.15 m	Robeilys Peinado; Venezuela	4.15 m
Long jump	Chantel Malone; British Virgin Islands	6.46 m (w: -0.3 m/s)	Irisdaymi Herrera; Cuba	6.36 m (w: +0.9 m/s)	Zoila Flores; Mexico	6.26 m (w: +1.0 m/s)
Triple jump	Caterine Ibargüen; Colombia	14.57 m (w: -0.4 m/s) GR	Dailenys Alcántara; Cuba	14.09 m (w: -0.3 m/s)	Yosiris Urrutia; Colombia	13.89 m (w: +0.3 m/s)
Shot put	Cleopatra Borel; Trinidad and Tobago	18.99 m	Yaniuvis López; Cuba	17.88 m	Sandra Lemos; Colombia	17.50 m
Discus	Denia Caballero; Cuba	64.47 m GR	Yaime Pérez; Cuba	62.42 m	Johana Martínez; Colombia	56.27 m
Hammer	Yipsi Moreno; Cuba	71.35 m GR	Yurisleydi Ford; Cuba	69.62 m	Johana Moreno; Colombia	67.77 m
Javelin	Flor Ruiz; Colombia	63.80 m GR	Abigail Gómez; Mexico	57.28	Coralys Ortiz; Puerto Rico	54.53
Heptathlon	Yorgelis Rodríguez; Cuba	5984 pts GR	Yusleidys Mendieta; Cuba	5819 pts	Alysbeth Felix; Puerto Rico	5721 pts

== Medal table ==
* Host nation (Mexico)

Rank	Nation	Gold	Silver	Bronze	Total
1	Cuba	23	15	8	46
2	Mexico*	8	11	10	29
3	Colombia	5	9	10	24
4	Venezuela	4	5	4	13
5	Guatemala	2	1	1	4
6	Dominica	1	0	1	2
7	British Virgin Islands	1	0	0	1
7	Honduras	1	0	0	1
7	Saint Lucia	1	0	0	1
7	Trinidad and Tobago	1	0	0	1
11	Puerto Rico	0	2	4	6
12	U.S. Virgin Islands	0	1	3	4
13	Barbados	0	1	2	3
14	Antigua and Barbuda	0	1	0	1
14	Dominican Republic	0	1	0	1
16	Bahamas	0	0	1	1
16	Costa Rica	0	0	1	1
16	Jamaica	0	0	1	1
16	Panama	0	0	1	1
Totals (19 entries)		47	47	47	141

== Participation ==
According to an unofficial count, 417 athletes from 31 countries participated in the event.

- Antigua and Barbuda (2)
- Aruba (1)
- Bahamas (11)
- Barbados (4)
- Belize (2)
- Bermuda (2)
- British Virgin Islands (2)
- Cayman Islands (3)
- Colombia (43)
- Costa Rica (15)
- Cuba (65)
- Dominica (3)
- Dominican Republic (23)
- El Salvador (4)
- Grenada (4)
- Guatemala (13)
- Guyana (4)
- Haiti (10)
- Honduras (2)
- Jamaica (15)
- Mexico (82)
- Nicaragua (5)
- Panama (10)
- Puerto Rico (17)
- Saint Kitts and Nevis (8)
- Saint Lucia (3)
- Saint Vincent and the Grenadines (6)
- Suriname (3)
- Trinidad and Tobago (11)
- U.S. Virgin Islands (10)
- Venezuela (34)
