= Yvonne Treviño =

Mexican long jumper (born 1989)

Personal information
- Born: 8 March 1989 (age 36) Monterrey, Mexico

Sport
- Sport: Track and field
- Event: Long jump

Yvonne Alejandra Treviño Hayek (born March 8, 1989) is a Mexican track and field athlete who competes in the long jump. She is the current holder of the Mexican record with 6.70 m (21 ft 11 3/4 in) and has qualified for the 2016 Rio Olympics.

She is a three-time Mexican national champion (2011, 2013, 2016) and Central American and Caribbean Championships bronze medalist (2011).

She is coached by Drew Fucci and Kyle Tellez, son of Tom Tellez.

== Early life ==
Born and raised in Monterrey, Mexico, Trevino started her career in athletics at the age of 8 where at a national meet she broke the long jump meet record for her age. Her coach at the time, Araceli (Chely) Castilleja, realized she had talent and told her parents (Rodolfo Treviño and Yvonne Hayek) that one day she could "make history in track and field" for Mexico. She practised the sport regularly in school and in 2007 got her first bronze medal in the Mexican National Championship in Morelia. She was 18 years old at the time. In 2008, she achieved bronze medal again in her home city of Monterrey followed by another bronze in 2010 in San Jose del Cabo. In 2011, she achieve her first gold medal and national championship with 6.22 meters in Mexico City qualifying to the 2011 Pan American Games.

== Professional ==
Trevino graduated as a Dietitian from Tec de Monterrey in 2013. She received the highest award given to athletes from the institution upon graduation.
