= Abigail Gómez Hernández =

Mexican javelin thrower

Personal information
- Born: 31 January 1991 (age 35) Veracruz, Mexico

Sport
- Country: Mexico
- Sport: Track and field
- Event: Javelin throw
Medal record
Track and field
Representing Mexico
NACAC U23 Championships
| Gold medal – first place | 2012 Irapuato | Javelin throw |
CAC Championships
| Bronze medal – third place | 2011 Mayaguez | Javelin throw |

Abigail Gómez Hernández (born 31 January 1991) is a Mexican javelin thrower who competes in international elite track and field events. She participated at the 2011 Pan American Games and she is also a triple Mexican champion in the javelin throw.
