= 2011 Central American and Caribbean Championships in Athletics =

23rd Central American and Caribbean Championships
- Dates: 15–17 July
- Host city: Mayagüez , Puerto Rico
- Venue: Estadio Centroamericano de Mayagüez
- Level: Senior
- Events: 46
- Participation: 449 athletes from 35 nations

The 2011 Central American and Caribbean Championships in Athletics were held in Mayagüez, Puerto Rico. The event served as classifiers for the 2011 World Championships in Athletics and took place from July 15–17, 2011. It was the fourth time Puerto Rico hosted the event; the first time in Ponce in 1975, and later in San Juan in 1989 and 1997.

The Jamaican delegation topped the medals table with 26 medals (ten of them gold). Mexico was the next most successful nation with ten golds and a total haul of twenty medals, while Trinidad and Tobago took third with five golds and fifteen medals. Cuba, which had dominated the previous three editions, sent a small, weakened delegation and finished fifth (although seven of its nine athletes won medals). The host nation, Puerto Rico, achieved a total of 14 medals, 3 of which were gold. This was a huge improvement for Puerto Rico since the last edition in 2009, winning 1 more gold medal and 8 more total medals than the previous championships.

Two Championship records were set at the competition: Bianca Stuart equalled the women's long jump best of 6.81 metres and Mexican Juan Romero improved the 10,000 metres record by 26 seconds. Further to this, twelve national records were bettered during the competition. Jamaica's Korene Hinds was the only athlete to medal twice in individual events, taking the steeplechase title and a silver medal in the women's 1500 metres.

Among the competition highlights were the men's 400 metres hurdles (featuring Leford Green, Félix Sánchez and Jehue Gordon) and a duel between Renny Quow and Ramon Miller in the 400 metres. Vonette Dixon won a quick women's 100 metres hurdles where Brigitte Merlano and Lina Flórez became the first Colombians under thirteen seconds for the event. Levern Spencer secured her fourth consecutive high jump title. Cuban throwers Guillermo Martínez and Roberto Janet were the only other athletes who defended their titles from the 2009 edition.

== Organisation ==
The event had a budget of $650,000.00, the municipal government of Mayagüez has made a commitment to give $300,000.00 of these and the rest were from private sponsors. By April 28, 2011, twenty three participating countries had confirmed there attendance.

The final day of the event marked the first anniversary of the 2010 Central American and Caribbean Games and included artistic presentation in an activity in the plaza in front of the Central American Torch. The event was attended by Lamine Diack, the president of the International Association of Athletics Federations (IAAF).

== Participation ==
There were 449 athletes from 35 countries (33 member federations of the Central American and Caribbean Athletic Confederation (CACAC) and 2 of the 4 observer nations – Curaçao and Martinique) competing in total. There were no athletes from Anguilla, French Guiana and Guadeloupe.

Athletes from Curaçao made their first appearance at the competition under their island's flag, following the dissolution of the Netherlands Antilles the previous year.

== Medal summary ==
=== Men's events ===
Event	Gold		Silver		Bronze	
100 metres	Keston Bledman (TRI)	10.05	Daniel Bailey (ATG)	10.11	Dexter Lee (JAM)	10.18
200 metres	Michael Mathieu (BAH)	20.60	Rondel Sorrillo (TRI)	20.64	Jason Young (JAM)	20.78
400 metres	Renny Quow (TRI)	45.44	Ramon Miller (BAH)	45.56	Erison Hurtault (DMA)	45.93
800 metres	Andy González (CUB)	1:48.15	Moise Joseph (HAI)	1:48.94	Joel Mejia (DOM)	1:49.67
1500 metres	Nico Herrera (VEN)	3:44.92	Jose Esparza (MEX)	3:45.78	Jon Rankin (CAY)	3:46.09 NR
5000 metres	José Uribe (MEX)	14:08.10	Luis Orta (VEN)	14:14.30	Julio Pérez (MEX)	14:22.01
10,000 metres	Juan Romero (MEX)	28:54.06 CR	Alejandro Suárez (MEX)	29:15.49	Milton Ayala (COL)	30:55.71
Half marathon	Luis Collazo (PUR)	1:07:08	Luis Rivera (PUR)	1:08:38	Oscar Ceron (MEX)	1:09:17
3000 m steeplechase	Luis Enrique Ibarra (MEX)	8:55.86	Fernando Roman (PUR)	8:58.95 NU20R	Aaron Arias (MEX)	9:01.35
110 m hurdles	Eric Keddo (JAM)	13.49	Hector Cotto (PUR)	13.54 NR	Paulo Villar (COL)	13.60
400 m hurdles	Leford Green (JAM)	49.03	Félix Sánchez (DOM)	49.41	Jehue Gordon (TRI)	50.10
High jump	Trevor Barry (BAH)	2.28 m	James Grayman (ATG)	2.25 m	Darwin Edwards (LCA)	2.25 m
Pole vault	Cristian Sanchez (MEX)	5.00 m	Alexander Castillo (PUR)	4.90 m	César González (VEN)	4.90 m
Long jump	Tyrone Smith (BER)	8.06 m	Damar Forbes (JAM)	7.81 m	Raymond Higgs (BAH)	7.75 m
Triple jump	Samyr Lainé (HAI)	17.09 m	Osniel Tosca (CUB)	16.22 m	Wilbert Walker (JAM)	16.01 m
Shot put	O'Dayne Richards (JAM)	19.16 m	Stephen Saenz (MEX)	18.66 m	Eder Moreno (COL)	18.52 m
Discus throw	Jason Morgan (JAM)	60.20 m	Mario Cota (MEX)	58.80 m	Quincy Wilson (TRI)	56.85 m
Hammer throw	Roberto Janet (CUB)	71.65 m	Roberto Sawyer (CRC)	65.96 m	Pedro Muñoz (VEN)	63.63 m
Javelin throw	Guillermo Martínez (CUB)	81.55 m	Arley Ibargüen (COL)	75.71 m	Dayron Márquez (COL)	74.07 m
Decathlon	Marcos Sanchez (PUR)	7397 pts	Claston Bernard (JAM)	7299 pts	Jonathan Davis (VEN)	6766 pts
20,000 m race walk	Allan Segura (CRC)	1:28:56.08	Joe Bonilla (PUR)	1:40:18.94	Luis Ángel López (PUR)	1:40:34.16
4 × 100 m relay	Jamaica; Lerone Clarke; Dexter Lee; Jason Young; Oshane Bailey	38.81	Trinidad and Tobago; Aaron Armstrong; Darrel Brown; Emmanuel Callender; Keston Bledman	38.89	Saint Kitts and Nevis; Jason Rogers; Kim Collins; Antoine Adams; Brijesh Lawrence	39.07 NR
4 × 400 m relay	Bahamas; LaToy Williams; Avard Moncur; Michael Mathieu; Ramon Miller	3:01.33	Trinidad and Tobago; Lalonde Gordon; Jarrin Solomon; Deon Lendore; Renny Quow	3:01.65	Jamaica; Dwight Mullings; Riker Hylton; Dawayne Barrett; Leford Green	3:02.00

=== Women's events ===
Event	Gold		Silver		Bronze	
100 metres	Semoy Hackett (TRI)	11.27	Jura Levy (JAM)	11.36	Simone Facey (JAM)	11.39
200 metres	Nivea Smith (BAH)	22.80	Anthonique Strachan (BAH)	22.90	Anastasia Le-Roy (JAM)	23.13
400 metres	Shereefa Lloyd (JAM)	51.69	Patricia Hall (JAM)	51.85	Norma González (COL)	51.90
800 metres	Gabriela Medina (MEX)	2:01.50	Rosemary Almanza (CUB)	2:02.23	Natoya Goule (JAM)	2:02.83
1500 metres	Sandra Lopez (MEX)	4:22.65	Korene Hinds (JAM)	4:23.78	Pilar McShine (TRI)	4:24.93
5000 metres	Marisol Romero (MEX)	16:05.68	Sandra Lopez (MEX)	16:06.83	Johana Rivero (COL)	17:23.01
Half marathon	Michelle Coira (PUR)	1:21:07	Maria del Pilar Diaz (PUR)	1:21:45	Maria Montilla (VEN)	1:22:20
3000 m steeplechase	Korene Hinds (JAM)	9:54.67	Beverly Ramos (PUR)	9:58.11	Sara Prieto (MEX)	10:42.65
100 m hurdles	Vonette Dixon (JAM)	12.77	Brigitte Merlano (COL)	12.89 NR	Lina Flórez (COL)	12.94
400 m hurdles	Andrea Sutherland (JAM)	56.75	Yolanda Osana (DOM)	57.23	Katrina Seymour (BAH)	57.24 NU20R
High jump	Levern Spencer (LCA)	1.82 m	Marielys Rojas (VEN)	1.82 m	Fabiola Ayala (MEX)	1.79 m
Pole vault	Keisa Monterola (VEN)	4.00 m	Milena Agudelo (COL)	3.95 m	Andrea Zambrana (PUR)	3.80 m
Long jump	Bianca Stuart (BAH)	6.81 m CR, NR	Arantxa King (BER)	6.47 m	Yvonne Trevino (MEX)	6.30 m
Triple jump	Ayanna Alexander (TRI)	13.50 m	Aida Villareal (MEX)	13.40 m	Ana José (DOM)	13.11 m
Shot put	Cleopatra Borel-Brown (TRI)	19.00 m	Angela Rivas (COL)	17.12 m NR	Annie Alexander (TRI)	17.05 m
Discus throw	Denia Caballero (CUB)	62.06 m	Brittany Borrero (PUR)	54.03 m	Allison Randall (JAM)	52.75 m
Hammer throw	Eli Johana Moreno (COL)	67.97 m	Rosa Rodríguez (VEN)	65.74 m	Natalie Grant (JAM)	62.46 m
Javelin throw	Fresa Nuñez (DOM)	54.29 m NR	Flor Ruiz (COL)	54.02 m	Abigail Gomez (MEX)	53.13 m
Heptathlon	Gretchen Quintana (CUB)	5704 pts	Francia Manzanillo (DOM)	5601 pts	Peaches Roach (JAM)	5589 pts
10,000 m track walk	Milangela Rosales (VEN)	47:19.91	Sandra Galvis (COL)	48:23.59	Wilane Cuebas (PUR)	55:52.53
4 × 100 m relay	Trinidad and Tobago; Magnolia Howell; Michelle-Lee Ahye; Ayanna Hutchinson; Semoy Hackett	43.47	Jamaica; Jura Levy; Anastasia Le-Roy; Simone Facey; Patricia Hall	43.63	Bahamas; V'Alonee Robinson; Nivea Smith; Cache Armbrister; Anthonique Strachan	43.74
4 × 400 m relay	Jamaica; Andrea Sutherland; Shereefa Lloyd; Natoya Goule; Patricia Hall	3:29.86	Dominican Republic; Raysa Sanchez; Diana Taylor; Rosa Fabian; Yolanda Osana	3:34.73	Trinidad and Tobago; Alena Harriman; Magnolia Howell; Josanne Lucas; Afiya Walker	3:34.84

== Medal table ==
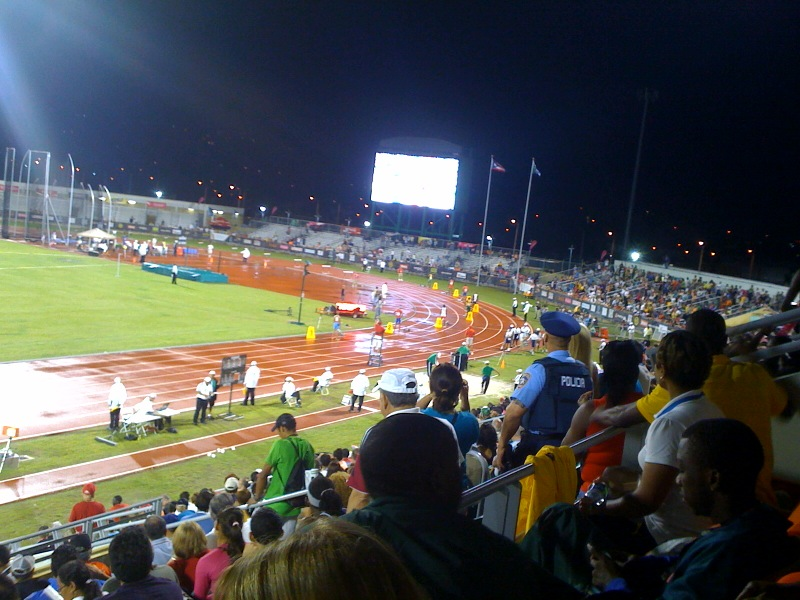
Men 400 metres hurdles final

* Host nation (Puerto Rico)

Rank	Nation	Gold	Silver	Bronze	Total
1	Jamaica	10	6	10	26
2	Mexico	7	6	7	20
3	Trinidad and Tobago	6	3	5	14
4	Bahamas	5	2	3	10
5	Cuba	5	2	0	7
6	Puerto Rico*	3	8	3	14
7	Venezuela	3	3	4	10
8	Colombia	1	6	7	14
9	Dominican Republic	1	4	2	7
10	Bermuda	1	1	0	2
10	Costa Rica	1	1	0	2
10	Haiti	1	1	0	2
13	Saint Lucia	1	0	1	2
14	Netherlands Antilles	0	2	0	2
15	Cayman Islands	0	0	1	1
15	Dominica	0	0	1	1
15	Saint Kitts and Nevis	0	0	1	1
Totals (17 entries)		45	45	45	135

== Participating nations ==
- Antigua and Barbuda (6)
- Aruba (4)
- Bahamas (29)
- Barbados (13)
- Belize (1)
- Bermuda (8)
- British Virgin Islands (7)
- Cayman Islands (7)
- Colombia (32)
- Costa Rica (7)
- Cuba (8)
- Curaçao (6)
- Dominica (5)
- Dominican Republic (37)
- Grenada (10)
- Guatemala (6)
- Guyana (3)
- Haiti (17)
- Honduras (8)
- Jamaica (34)
- Martinique (4)
- Mexico (46)
- Montserrat (2)
- Nicaragua (1)
- Panama (4)
- Puerto Rico (59)
- Saint Kitts and Nevis (8)
- Saint Lucia (5)
- Saint Vincent and the Grenadines (9)
- El Salvador (3)
- Suriname (2)
- Trinidad and Tobago (27)
- Turks and Caicos Islands (1)
- United States Virgin Islands (13)
- Venezuela (17)
