= 2012 NACAC Under-23 Championships in Athletics – Results =

These are the results of the 2012 NACAC Under-23 Championships in Athletics which took place from 6 to 8 July 2012 in Irapuato, Mexico.

== Men's results ==
=== 100 meters ===
Heats

Rank	Name	Nationality	Time	Notes
1	Charles Silmon	United States	10.19 wind: 0.8 m/s	Q
2	Jamol James	Trinidad and Tobago	10.20 wind: 0.8 m/s	Q
3	Jason Rogers	Saint Kitts and Nevis	10.22 wind: 0.8 m/s	Q
4	Keenan Brock	United States	10.23 wind: 1.2 m/s	Q
5	Warren Fraser	Bahamas	10.23 wind: 0.8 m/s	Q
6	Akeem Haynes	Canada	10.28 wind: 0.8 m/s	q
7	Lestrod Roland	Saint Kitts and Nevis	10.35 wind: 0.8 m/s	q
8	Alfred Higgs	Bahamas	10.40 wind: 0.8 m/s	PB
9	Ian Warner	Canada	10.43 wind: 1.2 m/s	Q
10	Shekeim Greaves	Barbados	10.45 wind: 0.8 m/s	=PB
11	Ramone McKenzie	Jamaica	10.46 wind: 1.2 m/s	
12	Harold Houston	Bermuda	10.48 wind: 1.2 m/s	PB
13	Shermund Allsop	Trinidad and Tobago	10.53 wind: 0.8 m/s	
14	Nicholas Deshong	Barbados	10.67 wind: 0.8 m/s	
15	Karl Williams	United States Virgin Islands	10.69 wind: 0.8 m/s	
16	Shernyl Burns	Montserrat	10.76 wind: 1.2 m/s	
17	Kemner Barrett	Costa Rica	10.77 wind: 0.8 m/s	
18	Daniel Villarreal	Mexico	10.87 wind: 0.8 m/s	
19	Josef Norales	Honduras	10.88 wind: 0.8 m/s	
20	Julián Alfonso Tamez	Mexico	11.15 wind: 1.2 m/s	
21	Roshano Cox	Turks and Caicos Islands	11.21 wind: 1.2 m/s	

Final – Wind: +0.9 m/s

Rank	Name	Nationality	Time	Notes
1st place, gold medalist(s)	Jason Rogers	Saint Kitts and Nevis	10.06	=CR
2nd place, silver medalist(s)	Keenan Brock	United States	10.15	
3rd place, bronze medalist(s)	Charles Silmon	United States	10.17	
4	Akeem Haynes	Canada	10.23	PB
5	Jamol James	Trinidad and Tobago	10.26	
6	Warren Fraser	Bahamas	10.30	
6	Ian Warner	Canada	10.30	
8	Lestrod Roland	Saint Kitts and Nevis	10.44	

=== 200 meters ===
Heats

Rank	Name	Nationality	Time	Notes
1	Tremaine Harris	Canada	20.53 wind: -0.9 m/s	Q
2	Keith Ricks	United States	20.67 wind: -0.1 m/s	Q
3	Trevorvano Mackey	Bahamas	20.89 wind: -1.1 m/s	Q
4	Prezel Hardy	United States	21.04 wind: -0.9 m/s	Q
5	Ramone McKenzie	Jamaica	21.06 wind: -0.1 m/s	Q
6	Lestrod Roland	Saint Kitts and Nevis	21.07 wind: -1.1 m/s	Q
7	Harold Houston	Bermuda	21.11 wind: -0.1 m/s	q
8	Nicholas Deshong	Barbados	21.23 wind: -0.1 m/s	q
9	Burkheart Ellis	Barbados	21.23 wind: -0.9 m/s	
10	Kasheem Colbourne	Antigua and Barbuda	21.60 wind: -0.1 m/s	
11	Salvador Gómez	Mexico	21.61 wind: -1.1 m/s	
12	Moriba Morain	Trinidad and Tobago	21.64 wind: -0.9 m/s	
13	Jonathan Santana	Dominican Republic	21.67 wind: -0.9 m/s	PB
14	Emmanuel Brioso	Dominican Republic	21.86 wind: -1.1 m/s	
15	Karl Williams	United States Virgin Islands	21.90 wind: -1.1 m/s	
16	Marcus Thompson	Bahamas	22.48 wind: -0.9 m/s	
17	Josef Norales	Honduras	22.75 wind: -0.9 m/s	
18	Roshano Cox	Turks and Caicos Islands	22.80 wind: -0.1 m/s	
	Shernyl Burns	Montserrat	DNF wind: -0.1 m/s	

Final – Wind: -0.5 m/s

Rank	Name	Nationality	Time	Notes
1st place, gold medalist(s)	Tremaine Harris	Canada	20.22	PB
2nd place, silver medalist(s)	Prezel Hardy	United States	20.40	
3rd place, bronze medalist(s)	Keith Ricks	United States	20.50	
4	Trevorvano Mackey	Bahamas	20.52	PB
5	Ramone McKenzie	Jamaica	20.75	
6	Lestrod Roland	Saint Kitts and Nevis	20.76	
7	Harold Houston	Bermuda	20.96	
8	Nicholas Deshong	Barbados	21.25	

=== 400 meters ===
Heats

Rank	Name	Nationality	Time	Notes
1	David Verburg	United States	45.95	Q
2	Brady Gehret	United States	46.25	Q
3	Jeffery Gibson	Bahamas	46.37	Q
4	Alonzo Russell	Bahamas	46.83	Q
5	Philip Osei	Canada	47.08	Q
6	Akheem Gauntlett	Jamaica	47.23	q
7	Joel Mejia	Dominican Republic	47.48	q
8	Burkheart Ellis	Barbados	48.06	Q
9	Luis Martín García	Mexico	48.29	
10	Salvador Gómez	Mexico	48.41	
11	Junior Acosta	Dominican Republic	48.42	
	Akino Ming	Jamaica	DNF	

Final

Rank	Name	Nationality	Time	Notes
1st place, gold medalist(s)	David Verburg	United States	45.14	
2nd place, silver medalist(s)	Philip Osei	Canada	45.51	PB
3rd place, bronze medalist(s)	Jeffery Gibson	Bahamas	46.30	PB
4	Joel Mejia	Dominican Republic	46.32	PB
5	Alonzo Russell	Bahamas	46.56	
6	Akheem Gauntlett	Jamaica	46.95	
7	Burkheart Ellis	Barbados	47.20	
	Brady Gehret	United States	DNF	

=== 800 meters ===
Heats

Rank	Name	Nationality	Time	Notes
1	Richard West	Jamaica	1:52.01	Q
2	Casimir Loxsom	United States	1:52.03	Q
3	Tayron Reyes	Dominican Republic	1:52.28	Q
4	Michael Preble	United States	1:52.50	Q
5	Thomas Riva	Canada	1:52.61	q
6	Sadiki White	Jamaica	1:52.77	Q
7	Christopher Antonio Sandoval	Mexico	1:52.93	q
8	Seymour Walter	United States Virgin Islands	1:53.57	Q
9	Scott Leitch	Canada	1:54.24	
10	Cerrio Rolle	Bahamas	1:55.87	
11	Henry Stevens-Carty	Bermuda	1:56.93	
12	Alberto Martínez	Mexico	1:59.15	
13	José Alberto Veras	Dominican Republic	2:03.12	

Final

Rank	Name	Nationality	Time	Notes
1st place, gold medalist(s)	Michael Preble	United States	1:48.69	
2nd place, silver medalist(s)	Tayron Reyes	Dominican Republic	1:49.09	
3rd place, bronze medalist(s)	Casimir Loxsom	United States	1:49.35	
4	Richard West	Jamaica	1:49.62	
5	Thomas Riva	Canada	1:52.84	
6	Christopher Antonio Sandoval	Mexico	1:53.96	
7	Seymour Walter	United States Virgin Islands	1:57.08	
	Sadiki White	Jamaica	DNF	

=== 1500 meters ===
Final

Rank	Name	Nationality	Time	Notes
1st place, gold medalist(s)	Kyle Merber	United States	3:51.61	
2nd place, silver medalist(s)	Charles Philibert-Thiboutot	Canada	3:52.00	
3rd place, bronze medalist(s)	Riley Masters	United States	3:52.15	
4	Ross Proufoot	Canada	3:52.47	
5	Jesús Arturo Esparza	Mexico	3:54.63	
6	Christopher Antonio Sandoval	Mexico	3:58.84	
	Álvaro Luis Abreu	Dominican Republic	DNF	

=== 5000 meters ===
Final

Rank	Name	Nationality	Time	Notes
1st place, gold medalist(s)	Andrew Bayer	United States	15:13.01	
2nd place, silver medalist(s)	George Alex	United States	15:28.27	
3rd place, bronze medalist(s)	Ezau Arias	Mexico	15:33.29	
4	Emmanuel Nava	Mexico	15:39.18	

=== 10,000 meters ===
Final

Rank	Name	Nationality	Time	Notes
1st place, gold medalist(s)	Gabe Proctor	United States	30:46.85	
2nd place, silver medalist(s)	Elliott Krause	United States	30:57.88	
3rd place, bronze medalist(s)	Alejandro Arroyo	Mexico	31:39.99	
4	Eloy Sánchez	Mexico	31:48.38	
5	Sean Trott	Bermuda	33:26.91	
6	Carlos Rivera	Costa Rica	34:22.31	
	Leighton Spencer	Jamaica	DNF	

=== 3000 meters steeplechase ===
Final

Rank	Name	Nationality	Time	Notes
1st place, gold medalist(s)	Luis Alberto Gallegos	Mexico	9:22.75	
2nd place, silver medalist(s)	Jared Bassett	United States	9:23.39	
3rd place, bronze medalist(s)	Javier Quintana	Mexico	9:23.44	
4	Alexander Brill	United States	9:43.82	
5	Álvaro Luis Abreu	Dominican Republic	10:05.77	
	Delohnni Nicol-Samuel	Saint Vincent and the Grenadines	DNF	

=== 110 meters hurdles ===
Heats

Rank	Name	Nationality	Time	Notes
1	Barrett Nugent	United States	13.61 wind: 1.5 m/s	Q
2	Eddie Lovett	United States	13.67 wind: 1.5 m/s	Q
3	Greggmar Swift	Barbados	13.69 wind: 1.5 m/s	Q
4	Shane Brathwaite	Barbados	13.75 wind: 1.5 m/s	Q
5	Nathan Arnett	Bahamas	13.83 wind: 1.5 m/s	Q PB
6	Sekou Kaba	Canada	13.94 wind: 1.5 m/s	q
7	Ingvar Moseley	Canada	13.98 wind: 1.5 m/s	Q
8	Genaro Rodríguez	Mexico	13.99 wind: 1.5 m/s	q
9	Dennis Bain	Bahamas	14.11 wind: 1.5 m/s	
10	Rodrigo Casar	Mexico	14.32 wind: 1.5 m/s	
11	Tristan Joynes	Bermuda	14.57 wind: 1.5 m/s	

Final – Wind: +1.8 m/s

Rank	Name	Nationality	Time	Notes
1st place, gold medalist(s)	Shane Brathwaite	Barbados	13.31	CR PB
2nd place, silver medalist(s)	Barrett Nugent	United States	13.32	PB
3rd place, bronze medalist(s)	Greggmar Swift	Barbados	13.54	
4	Eddie Lovett	United States	13.58	
5	Sekou Kaba	Canada	13.81	
6	Ingvar Moseley	Canada	13.87	
7	Genaro Rodríguez	Mexico	13.99	
8	Nathan Arnett	Bahamas	14.31	

=== 400 meters hurdles ===
Final

Rank	Name	Nationality	Time	Notes
1st place, gold medalist(s)	Jeffery Gibson	Bahamas	50.27	
2nd place, silver medalist(s)	Michael Stigler	United States	50.48	
3rd place, bronze medalist(s)	Leslie Murray	United States Virgin Islands	50.48	
4	Nathan Arnett	Bahamas	50.71	
5	Tait Nystuen	Canada	51.14	
6	Ali Arastu	United States	51.49	
7	Gabriel EL Hanbli	Canada	51.75	
8	Alejandro Parada	Mexico	52.36	
9	Kemar Norgrove	Barbados	55.39	

=== High jump ===
Final

Rank	Name	Nationality	Result	Notes
1st place, gold medalist(s)	Edgar Alejandro Rivera	Mexico	2.23m	
2nd place, silver medalist(s)	Luis Joel Castro	Puerto Rico	2.21m	
3rd place, bronze medalist(s)	Domanique Missick	Turks and Caicos Islands	2.19m	NR
4	Bryan McBride	United States	2.16m	
5	Django Lovett	Canada	2.10m	
6	James Harris	United States	2.00m	
7	Keron Stoute	British Virgin Islands	2.00m	
	Domingo Reyes	Dominican Republic	NH	
	Aldo Orlando Nieto	Mexico	NH	

=== Pole vault ===
Final

Rank	Name	Nationality	Result	Notes
1st place, gold medalist(s)	Michael Woepse	United States	5.40m	
2nd place, silver medalist(s)	K'don Samuels	Jamaica	5.35m	NR
3rd place, bronze medalist(s)	Logan Cunningham	United States	5.30m	
4	Rubén Viveros	Mexico	5.10m	PB
5	Rick Valcin	Saint Lucia	4.90m	
6	Pedro Daniel Figueroa	El Salvador	4.90m	
7	Roberto Patiño	Mexico	4.70m	

=== Long jump ===
Final

Rank	Name	Nationality	Result	Notes
1st place, gold medalist(s)	Marquis Dendy	United States	7.68m (-1.2 m/s)	
2nd place, silver medalist(s)	Kendall Spencer	United States	7.67m (-0.4 m/s)	
3rd place, bronze medalist(s)	Taylor Stewart	Canada	7.50m (-0.9 m/s)	
4	Jharyl Bowry	Canada	7.46m (-1.2 m/s)	
5	Alberto Álvarez	Mexico	7.24m (-0.7 m/s)	
6	Abraham Rodríguez	Mexico	7.11m (-0.9 m/s)	
7	Domingo Reyes	Dominican Republic	6.93m (-1.1 m/s)	
8	Chemikel Deangelo	Costa Rica	6.69m (-0.2 m/s)	
9	Daniel Herrera	Costa Rica	6.42m (-0.4 m/s)	

=== Triple jump ===
Final

Rank	Name	Nationality	Result	Notes
1st place, gold medalist(s)	Chris Phipps	United States	16.19 m (53 ft 1 1/4 in) (1.2 m/s)	=PB
2nd place, silver medalist(s)	Chris Benard	United States	15.90 m (52 ft 1 3/4 in) (0.8 m/s)	
3rd place, bronze medalist(s)	J'Vente Deveaux	Bahamas	15.90 m (52 ft 1 3/4 in) (0.9 m/s)	
4	Alberto Álvarez	Mexico	15.87 m (52 ft 3/4 in) (1.9 m/s)	
5	Hasheem Abdul-Halim	United States Virgin Islands	15.60 m (51 ft 2 in) w (2.3 m/s)	
6	Fabián Zavala	Mexico	15.06 m (49 ft 4 3/4 in) (0.4 m/s)	

=== Shot put ===
Final

Rank	Name	Nationality	Result	Notes
1st place, gold medalist(s)	Jacob Thormaehlen	United States	19.86m	
2nd place, silver medalist(s)	Stephen Sáenz	Mexico	19.31m	
3rd place, bronze medalist(s)	Hayden Baillio	United States	19.21m	
4	Timothy Nedow	Canada	18.99m	
5	Tim Hendry-Gallagher	Canada	18.53m	
6	Josué Santana	Mexico	17.31m	
7	Raybert Pérez	Dominican Republic	14.97m	

=== Discus throw ===
Final

Rank	Name	Nationality	Result	Notes
1st place, gold medalist(s)	Traves Smikle	Jamaica	62.11m	
2nd place, silver medalist(s)	Mason Finley	United States	59.00m	
3rd place, bronze medalist(s)	Quincy Wilson	Trinidad and Tobago	57.98m	
4	Chad Wright	Jamaica	56.92m	
5	Mario Cota	Mexico	56.02m	
6	Timothy Nedow	Canada	54.64m	
7	Jared Thomas	United States	53.72m	
8	Andrew Wells	Canada	48.10m	
9	Jorge Alan García	Mexico	46.01m	
10	Ángel Medina	Dominican Republic	43.40m	
	Winston Campbell	Honduras	NM	

=== Hammer throw ===
Final

Rank	Name	Nationality	Result	Notes
1st place, gold medalist(s)	Jeremy Postin	United States	68.32m	
2nd place, silver medalist(s)	Alec Faldermeyer	United States	65.41m	
3rd place, bronze medalist(s)	Ricardo Castilleja	Mexico	58.09m	
4	Michael McMillian	Mexico	52.01m	
5	Andrew Wells	Canada	51.18m	

=== Javelin throw ===
Final

Rank	Name	Nationality	Result	Notes
1st place, gold medalist(s)	Tim Glover	United States	78.28m	
2nd place, silver medalist(s)	Sam Humphreys	United States	77.04m	
3rd place, bronze medalist(s)	David Ocampo	Mexico	70.17m	
4	Brandon Heroux	Canada	70.02m	
5	Oraine Brown	Antigua and Barbuda	65.70m	NR
6	Josué Menéndez	Mexico	65.27m	

=== Decathlon ===
Final

The highest mark recorded in each event is highlighted in yellow

Rank	Name	Nationality	100m	LJ	SP	HJ	400m	110m H	DT	PV	JT	1500m	Points	Notes
1st place, gold medalist(s)	Jack Szmanda	United States	11.22; 812	6.70m 743	13.76m 714	1.91m 723	51.23; 759	15.81; 754	39.72m 659	4.90m 880	49.06m 575	5:21.64; 442	7061	
2nd place, silver medalist(s)	Brent Vogel	United States	11.33; 789	6.47m 691	12.44m 633	1.91m 723	49.71; 828	15.01; 848	37.63m 617	4.30m 702	36.53m 392	4:36.19; 704	6927	
3rd place, bronze medalist(s)	Gustavo Morua	Mexico	10.83; 899	6.64m 729	11.28m 563	1.88m 696	51.63; 741	16.53; 674	33.12m 526	3.70m 535	47.06m 545	5:03.44; 540	6448	
4	Juan Carlos de la Cruz	Dominican Republic	11.20; 817	6.77m 760	10.96m 543	1.85m 670	52.55; 701	15.75; 761	33.91m 542	3.55m 496	45.33m 520	5:19.55; 452	6262	
5	Juan Gibrán Vázquez	Mexico	11.24; 808	6.50m 697	7.62m 344	1.91m 723	50.94; 772	15.57; 782	31.47m 493	4.15m 659	36.35m 389	5:21.57; 442	6109	
	Martín Cedeño	Dominican Republic	11.31; 793	NM; 0	11.61m 583	1.64m 496	DNS; 0						DNF	

=== 20,000 meters walk ===
Final

Rank	Name	Nationality	Time	Notes
1st place, gold medalist(s)	Evan Dunfee	Canada	1:26:15.32	
2nd place, silver medalist(s)	Adrián Ochoa	Mexico	1:27:56.18	=PB
3rd place, bronze medalist(s)	Mauricio Calvo	Costa Rica	1:31:58.42	
4	Nick Christie	United States	1:33:45.85	
	Dan Serianni	United States	DNF	

=== 4 x 100 meters relay ===
Final

Rank	Nation	Competitors	Time	Notes
1st place, gold medalist(s)	United States	Darrell Wesh; Charles Silmon; Marcus Rowland; Keenan Brock	38.94	
2nd place, silver medalist(s)	Bahamas	Trevorvano Mackey; Warren Fraser; Marcus Thompson; Alfred Higgs	39.65	
3rd place, bronze medalist(s)	Jamaica	Paul McPearson; Ramone McKenzie; Akheem Gauntlett; Akino Ming	39.67	
4	Canada	Akeem Haynes; Ian Warner; Tremaine Harris; Philip Osei	39.82	
5	Barbados	Nicholas Deshong; Greggmar Swift; Burkheart Ellis; Shane Brathwaite	40.30	
	Mexico	Marco García; Alexis Benjahyr Viera; Genaro Rodríguez; Daniel Villarreal	DNF	

=== 4 x 400 meters relay ===
Final

Rank	Nation	Competitors	Time	Notes
1st place, gold medalist(s)	United States	James Harris; Chris Vaughn; Michael Preble; David Verburg	3:03.81	
2nd place, silver medalist(s)	Bahamas	Alfred Higgs; Danzell Forston; Jeffery Gibson; Alonzo Russell	3:04.33	
3rd place, bronze medalist(s)	Dominican Republic	Junior Acosta; Tayron Reyes; Jonathan Santana; Joel Mejia	3:07.88	
4	Mexico	Salvador Gómez; Óscar Omar Ramírez; José Jusacamea; Luis Martín García	3:11.90	

== Women's results ==
=== 100 meters ===
Final – Wind: +1.6 m/s

Rank	Name	Nationality	Time	Notes
1st place, gold medalist(s)	Aurieyall Scott	United States	11.19	CR
2nd place, silver medalist(s)	Octavious Freeman	United States	11.20	
3rd place, bronze medalist(s)	Crystal Emmanuel	Canada	11.43	
4	V'alonee Robinson	Bahamas	11.56	PB
5	Mara Weekes	Barbados	11.93	
6	Mercia Moncherry	Saint Lucia	12.01	
7	María del Consuelo Zamora	Mexico	12.13	
8	Perla Janeth Sánchez	Mexico	12.50	

=== 200 meters ===
Final – Wind: +0.9 m/s

Rank	Name	Nationality	Time	Notes
1st place, gold medalist(s)	Kimberlyn Duncan	United States	22.72	CR
2nd place, silver medalist(s)	Allison Peter	United States Virgin Islands	22.92	
3rd place, bronze medalist(s)	Cambrya Jones	United States	23.00	
4	Amara Jones	Bahamas	23.54	
5	Ashley Kelly	British Virgin Islands	23.77	
6	Britney Wattley	British Virgin Islands	24.17	
7	Maritza Heredia	Mexico	25.13	
8	Heidy Palacios	Honduras	25.23	
9	María Alejandra García-Cornejo	Mexico	25.38	

=== 400 meters ===
Heats

Rank	Name	Nationality	Time	Notes
1	Jodi-Ann Muir	Jamaica	53.21	Q
2	Marlena Wesh	Haiti	53.37	Q
3	Rebecca Alexander	United States	53.43	Q
4	Ashley Kelly	British Virgin Islands	53.56	Q
5	Sparkle McKnight	Trinidad and Tobago	53.78	Q
6	Amara Jones	Bahamas	53.89	Q
7	Shawna Fermin	Trinidad and Tobago	54.45	q
8	Althia Maximilien	Barbados	54.95	q
9	Sade Sealy	Barbados	55.38	
10	Yanique Haye	Jamaica	55.70	
11	Estefania de la Cruz	Mexico	56.07	
12	Heidy Palacios	Honduras	56.44	
13	Erika Rodríguez	Mexico	56.75	

Final

Rank	Name	Nationality	Time	Notes
1st place, gold medalist(s)	Rebecca Alexander	United States	51.13	CR PB
2nd place, silver medalist(s)	Marlena Wesh	Haiti	51.23	NR
3rd place, bronze medalist(s)	Jodi-Ann Muir	Jamaica	52.44	
4	Sparkle McKnight	Trinidad and Tobago	52.79	
5	Ashley Kelly	British Virgin Islands	53.35	
6	Shawna Fermin	Trinidad and Tobago	53.42	
7	Althia Maximilien	Barbados	53.65	
8	Amara Jones	Bahamas	54.04	

=== 800 meters ===
Heats

Rank	Name	Nationality	Time	Notes
1	Chanelle Price	United States	2:10.64	Q
2	Charlene Lipsey	United States	2:10.99	Q
3	Annie LeBlanc	Canada	2:11.17	Q
4	Rachel Francois	Canada	2:12.62	Q
5	Asia Henry	Jamaica	2:12.66	Q
6	Gladys Landaverde	El Salvador	2:13.56	q
7	Estefania de la Cruz	Mexico	2:14.98	Q
8	Thalia Márquez	Mexico	2:15.55	q
9	Ninfa Barnard	United States Virgin Islands	2:18.16	
10	Shelleyka Rolle	Bahamas	2:19.12	

Final

Rank	Name	Nationality	Time	Notes
1st place, gold medalist(s)	Chanelle Price	United States	2:04.48	
2nd place, silver medalist(s)	Annie LeBlanc	Canada	2:05.61	
3rd place, bronze medalist(s)	Rachel Francois	Canada	2:06.77	
4	Estefania de la Cruz	Mexico	2:10.57	
5	Charlene Lipsey	United States	2:11.15	
6	Gladys Landaverde	El Salvador	2:11.57	
7	Thalia Márquez	Mexico	2:11.95	
8	Asia Henry	Jamaica	2:28.60	

=== 1500 meters ===
Final

Rank	Name	Nationality	Time	Notes
1st place, gold medalist(s)	Jordan Hasay	United States	4:22.16	
2nd place, silver medalist(s)	Annie LeBlanc	Canada	4:24.97	
3rd place, bronze medalist(s)	Karla Díaz	Mexico	4:27.66	
4	Alejandra Rodríguez	Mexico	4:37.72	
5	Jennifer Bergman	United States	4:41.08	
6	Gladys Landaverde	El Salvador	4:44.85	
7	María Mancebo	Dominican Republic	4:45.89	

=== 5000 meters ===
Final

Rank	Name	Nationality	Time	Notes
1st place, gold medalist(s)	Karla Díaz	Mexico	16:54.83	
2nd place, silver medalist(s)	Jennifer Bergman	United States	17:22.18	
3rd place, bronze medalist(s)	Dani Stack	United States	18:07.87	

=== 10,000 meters ===
Final

Rank	Name	Nationality	Time	Notes
1st place, gold medalist(s)	Sarah Callister	United States	35:46.12	CR
2nd place, silver medalist(s)	Mayra Sánchez	Mexico	36:07.69	
3rd place, bronze medalist(s)	Katie Matthews	United States	36:21.29	
4	Carolina Macías	Mexico	38:38.29	

=== 3000 meters steeplechase ===
Final

Rank	Name	Nationality	Time	Notes
1st place, gold medalist(s)	Alyssa Kulik	United States	10:21.04	
2nd place, silver medalist(s)	Rebeka Stowe	United States	10:45.14	
3rd place, bronze medalist(s)	Jessica Furlan	Canada	10:51.26	
4	Geneviève Lalonde	Canada	10:56.38	
5	Norma Becerra	Mexico	11:01.33	
6	María Mancebo	Dominican Republic	11:20.06	
7	Ana Cristina Narváez	Mexico	11:28.16	

=== 100 meters hurdles ===
Final – Wind: +4.5 m/s

Rank	Name	Nationality	Time	Notes
1st place, gold medalist(s)	Brianna Rollins	United States	12.60 w	
2nd place, silver medalist(s)	Kierre Beckles	Barbados	13.05 w	
3rd place, bronze medalist(s)	Ashlea Maddex	Canada	13.21 w	
4	Ivanique Kemp	Bahamas	13.34 w	
5	Marissa Smith	Canada	13.34 w	
6	Kenrisha Brathwaite	Barbados	13.47 w	
7	Krystal Bodie	Bahamas	13.67 w	
8	Elizabeth López	Mexico	13.74 w	
9	Elisa María Barrón	Mexico	14.74 w	

=== 400 meters hurdles ===
Final

Rank	Name	Nationality	Time	Notes
1st place, gold medalist(s)	Cassandra Tate	United States	55.62	
2nd place, silver medalist(s)	Ellen Wortham	United States	57.10	
3rd place, bronze medalist(s)	Danielle Dowie	Jamaica	58.23	
4	Yanique Haye	Jamaica	58.35	
5	Christine Lowe	Canada	59.23	
6	Latoya Griffith	Barbados	59.42	
7	Erika Rodríguez	Mexico	59.80	PB
8	Eva María Chávez	Mexico	1:02.49	

=== High jump ===
Final

Rank	Name	Nationality	Result	Notes
1st place, gold medalist(s)	Tynita Butts	United States	1.82m	
2nd place, silver medalist(s)	Michelle Theophille	Canada	1.82m	
3rd place, bronze medalist(s)	Allison Barwise	United States	1.74m	
4	Kenya Culmer	Bahamas	1.74m	
5	Rachel Machin	Canada	1.74m	
6	Catherin Nina	Dominican Republic	1.70m	
7	Shinelle Proctor	Anguilla	1.70m	
8	Gloria Alejandra Maldonado	Mexico	1.65m	
	Saniel Atkinson-Grier	Jamaica	NH	

=== Pole vault ===
Final

Rank	Name	Nationality	Result	Notes
1st place, gold medalist(s)	Mélanie Blouin	Canada	4.36m	CR
2nd place, silver medalist(s)	Logan Miller	United States	4.25m	
3rd place, bronze medalist(s)	Martha Olimpia Villalobos	Mexico	3.60m	
	Stephanie Richartz	United States	NH	
	Isabella Smith	Mexico	NH	

=== Long jump ===
Final

Rank	Name	Nationality	Result	Notes
1st place, gold medalist(s)	Christabel Nettey	Canada	6.18m (0.8 m/s)	
2nd place, silver medalist(s)	Sonnisha Williams	United States	6.17m (-0.4 m/s)	
3rd place, bronze medalist(s)	Elizabeth López	Mexico	6.04m (-0.2 m/s)	
4	Sabrina Nettey	Canada	6.04m (-0.2 m/s)	
5	Sandisha Antoine	Saint Lucia	5.71m (-1.1 m/s)	
6	Shinelle Proctor	Anguilla	5.63m (1.6 m/s)	
7	Gloria Alejandra Maldonado	Mexico	5.20m (0.4 m/s)	

=== Triple jump ===
Final

Rank	Name	Nationality	Result	Notes
1st place, gold medalist(s)	Andrea Geubelle	United States	13.14m (-0.9 m/s)	
2nd place, silver medalist(s)	Michelle Jenije	United States	13.13m (-2.6 m/s)	
3rd place, bronze medalist(s)	Jasmine Brunson	Bermuda	12.62m (-1.2 m/s)	
4	Luz Adriana García	Mexico	12.42m (-0.8 m/s)	
5	Liliana Hernández	Mexico	12.35m (-1.1 m/s)	
6	Allison Outerbride	Bermuda	12.01m (-0.7 m/s)	

=== Shot put ===
Final

Rank	Name	Nationality	Result	Notes
1st place, gold medalist(s)	Brittany Smith	United States	17.03m	
2nd place, silver medalist(s)	Alyssa Hasslen	United States	16.86m	
3rd place, bronze medalist(s)	Taryn Suttie	Canada	16.22m	PB
4	Hilenn James	Trinidad and Tobago	15.88m	
5	Cynthia Appiah-Serwaah	Canada	14.87m	PB
6	Cecilia Dzul	Mexico	14.86m	
7	Mariela Hernández	Mexico	14.20m	
8	Julianna Duncanson	Bahamas	12.71m	

=== Discus throw ===
Final

Rank	Name	Nationality	Result	Notes
1st place, gold medalist(s)	Anna Jelmini	United States	53.93m	
2nd place, silver medalist(s)	Skylar White	United States	50.60m	
3rd place, bronze medalist(s)	Hilenn James	Trinidad and Tobago	48.90m	
4	Ashlee Smith	Trinidad and Tobago	48.73m	
5	Alanna Kovacs	Canada	47.66m	
6	Ana Daniela González	Mexico	44.05m	
7	Julianna Duncanson	Bahamas	40.00m	
8	María Joaquina Salazar	Mexico	39.43m	

=== Hammer throw ===
Final

Rank	Name	Nationality	Result	Notes
1st place, gold medalist(s)	Amanda Bingson	United States	71.39m	CR
2nd place, silver medalist(s)	Brittany Smith	United States	67.10m	
3rd place, bronze medalist(s)	Lauren Stuart	Canada	56.35m	
4	Cynthia Appiah-Serwaah	Canada	53.60m	
5	Judyth Alvarado	Mexico	50.15m	
6	Ana Margarita Sánchez	Mexico	49.80m	

=== Javelin throw ===
Final

Rank	Name	Nationality	Result	Notes
1st place, gold medalist(s)	Abigail Gómez	Mexico	56.89m	NR, CR
2nd place, silver medalist(s)	Tiffany Perkins	Canada	56.20m	PB
3rd place, bronze medalist(s)	Alanna Kovacs	Canada	51.70m	
4	Heather Bergman	United States	49.98m	
5	Paige Blackburn	United States	49.61m	
6	Diana Garza	Mexico	42.05m	

=== Heptathlon ===
Final

The highest mark recorded in each event is highlighted in yellow

Rank	Name	Nationality	100m H	HJ	SP	200m	LJ	JT	800m	Points	Notes
1st place, gold medalist(s)	Kiani Profit	United States	13.93; 988	1.58m 712	11.93m 656	24.08; 973	5.72m 765	40.86m 684	2:16.26; 875	5653	
2nd place, silver medalist(s)	Jessica Flax	United States	13.38; 1068	1.64m 783	12.49m 694	24.88; 898	5.33m 651	40.59m 679	2:23.92; 771	5544	
3rd place, bronze medalist(s)	Makeba Alcide	Saint Lucia	13.87; 997	1.76m 928	12.39m 687	24.87; 899	5.79m 786	30.79m 492	2:26.83; 733	5522	
4	Rachel McIntosh	Canada	14.12; 961	1.61m 747	12.06m 665	25.14; 874	5.45m 686	35.81m 587	2:18.68; 842	5362	
5	Milagros Montes de Oca	Dominican Republic	15.04; 836	1.58m 712	9.73m 512	26.71; 736	5.26m 631	42.92m 723	2:34.64; 636	4786	
6	Ana María Porras	Costa Rica	14.44; 917	1.64m 783	10.23m 545	25.96; 801	5.46m 688	25.65m 395	2:33.08; 655	4784	
7	Marcela Joely Díaz	Mexico	15.29; 804	1.52m 644	9.63m 505	26.73; 734	5.23m 623	35.57m 583	2:25.23; 754	4647	
8	Jessica Soto	Mexico	15.24; 810	1.55m 678	9.48m 495	26.69; 738	4.82m 511	32.98m 533	2:37.44; 603	4368	

=== 10,000 meters walk ===
Final

Rank	Name	Nationality	Time	Notes
1st place, gold medalist(s)	María Irais Mena	Mexico	52:52.54	
2nd place, silver medalist(s)	Rachael Tylock	United States	53:16.59	
3rd place, bronze medalist(s)	Nicole Bonk	United States	55:56.68	

=== 4 x 100 meters relay ===
Final

Rank	Nation	Competitors	Time	Notes
1st place, gold medalist(s)	United States	Cambrya Jones; Octavious Freeman; Aurieyall Scott; Kimberlyn Duncan	43.58	
2nd place, silver medalist(s)	Bahamas	V'alonee Robinson; Krystal Bodie; Ivanique Kemp; Amara Jones	45.71	
3rd place, bronze medalist(s)	Mexico	Mayra Hermosillo; Citlally Parra; Perla Janeth Sánchez; María del Consuelo Zamora	47.85	

=== 4 x 400 meters relay ===
Final

Rank	Nation	Competitors	Time	Notes
1st place, gold medalist(s)	United States	Ellen Wortham; Rebecca Alexander; Cassandra Tate; Diamond Dixon	3:28.64	
2nd place, silver medalist(s)	Trinidad and Tobago	Shawna Fermin; Alena Brooks; Jessica James; Sparkle McKnight	3:33.03	
3rd place, bronze medalist(s)	Jamaica	Yanique Haye; Danielle Dowie; Ladonna Richards; Jodi-Ann Muir	3:34.29	
4	Mexico	Jessica Acosta; Estefania de la Cruz; Erika Rodríguez; Eva María Chávez	3:44.90	
