= 2013 Central American and Caribbean Championships in Athletics – Results =

These are the results of the 2013 Central American and Caribbean Championships in Athletics which took place on July 5–7 in Morelia, Mexico.

== Men's results ==
=== 100 meters ===
Heats
Wind:
Heat 1: +3.0 m/s, Heat 2: +1.7 m/s, Heat 3: +1.2 m/s, Heat 4: +1.4 m/s

Rank	Heat	Name	Nationality	Time	Notes
1	2	Andrew Fisher	Jamaica	10.07	Q
2	4	Andrew Hinds	Barbados	10.13	Q
3	3	Shavez Hart	Bahamas	10.16	Q
4	1	Jason Rogers	Saint Kitts and Nevis	10.18	Q
5	1	Warren Fraser	Bahamas	10.19	q
5	2	Ramon Gittens	Barbados	10.19	q
7	4	Adam Harris	Guyana	10.20	q
8	2	Zharnel Hughes	Anguilla	10.23	q
9	2	Miguel López	Puerto Rico	10.24	
9	1	Rolando Palacios	Honduras	10.24	
11	3	Oshane Bailey	Jamaica	10.30	
12	4	Yoandry Andújar	Dominican Republic	10.39	
13	3	Carlos Rodríguez	Puerto Rico	10.40	
14	3	Corneil Lionel	Saint Lucia	10.42	
14	2	Jamol James	Trinidad and Tobago	10.42	
16	2	Brijesh Lawrence	Saint Kitts and Nevis	10.43	
17	4	Jonathan Juin	Haiti	10.47	
18	2	Julius Morris	Montserrat	10.54	
18	3	Alexis Viera	Mexico	10.54	
18	1	Chavaughn Walsh	Antigua and Barbuda	10.54	
21	1	Lester Ryan	Montserrat	10.56	
22	2	Julián Tamez	Mexico	10.58	
22	1	Emris Rogers	Anguilla	10.58	
22	3	Harold Houston	Bermuda	10.58	
25	4	Ayodele Taffe	Trinidad and Tobago	10.59	
26	4	Courtney Carl Williams	Saint Vincent and the Grenadines	10.60	
27	4	Paul Williams	Grenada	10.64	
28	3	Tyrell Cuffy	Cayman Islands	10.66	
28	4	Rhymeich Adolphus	Cayman Islands	10.66	
30	3	Michael Wilson	Grenada	10.74	
31	1	Roddy Monrose	Haiti	10.81	

Final
Wind:
+0.5 m/s

Rank	Name	Nationality	Time	Notes
1st place, gold medalist(s)	Andrew Fisher	Jamaica	10.14	
2nd place, silver medalist(s)	Andrew Hinds	Barbados	10.19	
3rd place, bronze medalist(s)	Ramon Gittens	Barbados	10.19	
4	Shavez Hart	Bahamas	10.23	
5	Jason Rogers	Saint Kitts and Nevis	10.24	
6	Adam Harris	Guyana	10.24	
7	Zharnel Hughes	Anguilla	10.25	
8	Warren Fraser	Bahamas	10.30	

=== 200 meters ===
Heats
Wind:
Heat 1: -0.1 m/s, Heat 2: +0.3 m/s, Heat 3: -0.9 m/s, Heat 4: -0.3 m/s, Heat 5: -1.2 m/s

Rank	Heat	Name	Nationality	Time	Notes
1	2	Lalonde Gordon	Trinidad and Tobago	20.57	Q
2	3	Antoine Adams	Saint Kitts and Nevis	20.68	Q
3	1	Jason Livermore	Jamaica	20.73	Q
4	4	Winston George	Guyana	20.78	Q
5	4	Jermaine Brown	Jamaica	20.82	q
6	1	Adam Harris	Guyana	20.87	q
7	3	Luguelín Santos	Dominican Republic	20.88	q
8	2	Joel Redhead	Grenada	20.99	
9	3	Trevorvano Mackey	Bahamas	21.01	
10	3	Miguel López	Puerto Rico	21.02	
11	5	Kyle Greaux	Trinidad and Tobago	21.11	Q
12	1	Carlos Rodríguez	Puerto Rico	21.14	
13	5	José Carlos Herrera	Mexico	21.20	
14	1	Rolando Palacios	Honduras	21.22	
15	2	Yoandry Andújar	Dominican Republic	21.25	
16	3	Harold Houston	Bermuda	21.37	
17	4	Corneil Lionel	Saint Lucia	21.38	
18	2	César Ramírez	Mexico	21.40	
19	2	Steven Lorrius	Haiti	21.45	
20	5	Gary Robinson	Costa Rica	21.50	
21	5	Julius Morris	Montserrat	21.66	
22	3	Courtney Carl Williams	Saint Vincent and the Grenadines	21.81	
23	5	Chavaughn Walsh	Antigua and Barbuda	22.08	
24	4	David Hamil	Cayman Islands	22.11	
25	4	Jordan Linch	Costa Rica	22.42	
26	2	Nicholas Deshong	Barbados	23.53	
	1	Burkheart Ellis	Barbados	DNF	
	1	Jonathan Juin	Haiti	DNF	

Final
Wind:
+0.5 m/s

Rank	Name	Nationality	Time	Notes
1st place, gold medalist(s)	Antoine Adams	Saint Kitts and Nevis	20.13	NR
2nd place, silver medalist(s)	Lalonde Gordon	Trinidad and Tobago	20.28	
3rd place, bronze medalist(s)	Jason Livermore	Jamaica	20.29	
4	Luguelín Santos	Dominican Republic	20.55	NR
5	Kyle Greaux	Trinidad and Tobago	20.58	
6	Adam Harris	Guyana	20.60	
7	Winston George	Guyana	20.67	
8	Jermaine Brown	Jamaica	20.92	

=== 400 meters ===
Heats

Rank	Heat	Name	Nationality	Time	Notes
1	2	Jarrin Solomon	Trinidad and Tobago	46.08	Q
2	1	Gustavo Cuesta	Dominican Republic	46.42	Q
3	1	LaToy Williams	Bahamas	46.50	Q
4	2	Wesley Neymour	Bahamas	46.66	Q
5	1	Omar Johnson	Jamaica	46.55	Q
6	2	Arismendy Peguero	Dominican Republic	46.69	Q
7	2	Akheem Gauntlett	Jamaica	46.79	q
8	2	Nery Brenes	Costa Rica	46.83	q
9	1	Winston George	Guyana	46.94	
10	2	José Fernando Martínez	Mexico	47.59	
11	1	Jarlex Lynch	Costa Rica	47.79	
12	2	Lestrod Roland	Saint Kitts and Nevis	48.17	
13	1	José de Jesús Fraire	Mexico	48.29	
14	2	Rolando Ayala	El Salvador	48.67	
15	1	Félix Martínez	Puerto Rico	50.59	
	1	Renny Quow	Trinidad and Tobago	DNF	

Final

Rank	Name	Nationality	Time	Notes
1st place, gold medalist(s)	Jarrin Solomon	Trinidad and Tobago	45.54	
2nd place, silver medalist(s)	Omar Johnson	Jamaica	45.67	
3rd place, bronze medalist(s)	Gustavo Cuesta	Dominican Republic	46.20	
4	Nery Brenes	Costa Rica	46.22	
5	Arismendy Peguero	Dominican Republic	46.90	
6	Akheem Gauntlett	Jamaica	51.16	
	LaToy Williams	Bahamas	DNF	
	Wesley Neymour	Bahamas	DQ	FS

=== 800 meters ===
Rank	Name	Nationality	Time	Notes
1st place, gold medalist(s)	Andy González	Cuba	1:49.54	
2nd place, silver medalist(s)	Ricardo Cunningham	Jamaica	1:49.97	
3rd place, bronze medalist(s)	Jowayne Hibbert	Jamaica	1:50.10	
4	James Eichberger	Mexico	1:50.13	
5	José Alberto Beras	Dominican Republic	1:50.25	
6	Aaron Evans	Bermuda	1:50.88	
7	César Belman	Mexico	1:51.86	
8	Masai Jeffers	Saint Kitts and Nevis	1:55.09	

=== 1500 meters ===
Rank	Name	Nationality	Time	Notes
1st place, gold medalist(s)	Christopher Sandoval	Mexico	3:52.94	
2nd place, silver medalist(s)	Fabián Guerrero	Mexico	3:53.53	
3rd place, bronze medalist(s)	José Alberto Beras	Dominican Republic	4:02.61	
4	DeLohnni Nicol-Samuel	Saint Vincent and the Grenadines	4:06.82	
5	Alvaro Abreu	Dominican Republic	4:17.14	

=== 5000 meters ===
Rank	Name	Nationality	Time	Notes
1st place, gold medalist(s)	Juan Luis Barrios	Mexico	14:08.19	
2nd place, silver medalist(s)	Fabián Guerrero	Mexico	14:48.94	
3rd place, bronze medalist(s)	Alfredo Arévalo	Guatemala	15:22.23	
4	Jeremías Saloj	Guatemala	15:22.24	
5	Denzil Ramirez	Trinidad and Tobago	16:26.17	
6	Elliot Mason	Antigua and Barbuda	16:53.84	

=== 10,000 meters ===
Rank	Name	Nationality	Time	Notes
1st place, gold medalist(s)	Juan Carlos Romero	Mexico	30:11.84	
2nd place, silver medalist(s)	Sergio Pedraza	Mexico	30:16.76	
3rd place, bronze medalist(s)	Alfredo Arévalo	Guatemala	32:23.55	
4	Richard Jones	Trinidad and Tobago	35:08.93	
5	Curtis Cox	Trinidad and Tobago	35:24.13	
	Daniel Vargas*	Mexico	30:24.24	
	Tomas Luna*	Mexico	30:46.91	
	Jeremías Saloj*	Guatemala	31:53.10	
	Luis Rivera*	Puerto Rico	32:08.28	
	Yeisel Cintrón	Puerto Rico	DNF	

=== 110 meters hurdles ===
Heats
Wind:
Heat 1: +1.9 m/s, Heat 2: +1.1 m/s

Rank	Heat	Name	Nationality	Time	Notes
1	1	Wayne Davis	Trinidad and Tobago	13.50	Q
2	2	Shane Brathwaite	Barbados	13.60	Q
3	2	Eric Keddo	Jamaica	13.62	Q
4	2	Yordan O'Farrill	Cuba	13.64	Q
5	1	Jeffrey Julmis	Haiti	13.67	Q
6	1	Enrique Llanos	Puerto Rico	13.76	Q
7	1	Genaro Rodríguez	Mexico	13.89	q
8	2	Héctor Cotto	Puerto Rico	14.03	q
9	1	Ackeem Smith	Jamaica	14.08	
10	2	José António Flores	Mexico	14.12	
11	2	Ronald Bennett	Honduras	14.32	
12	1	Luis Carlos Bonilla	Guatemala	14.63	

Final
Wind:
-3.4 m/s

Rank	Name	Nationality	Time	Notes
1st place, gold medalist(s)	Shane Brathwaite	Barbados	13.70	
2nd place, silver medalist(s)	Wayne Davis	Trinidad and Tobago	13.75	
3rd place, bronze medalist(s)	Yordan O'Farrill	Cuba	13.82	
4	Jeffrey Julmis	Haiti	13.83	
5	Eric Keddo	Jamaica	13.92	
6	Héctor Cotto	Puerto Rico	14.25	
7	Enrique Llanos	Puerto Rico	14.26	
8	Genaro Rodríguez	Mexico	14.39	

=== 400 meters hurdles ===
Heats

Rank	Heat	Name	Nationality	Time	Notes
1	2	Amaurys Valle	Cuba	50.43	Q
2	2	Emmanuel Mayers	Trinidad and Tobago	50.49	Q
3	2	Jamele Mason	Puerto Rico	50.53	Q
4	1	Jeffery Gibson	Bahamas	50.57	Q
5	2	Isa Phillips	Jamaica	50.64	q
6	1	Eric Alejandro	Puerto Rico	50.65	Q
7	1	Roxroy Cato	Jamaica	50.67	Q
8	2	Winder Cuevas	Dominican Republic	50.70	q
9	1	Leslie Murray	United States Virgin Islands	51.10	
10	1	Alie Beauvais	Haiti	52.50	
11	2	Gerald Drummond	Costa Rica	52.53	
12	2	José Luis Ceballos	Mexico	52.55	
13	1	Sergio Ríos	Mexico	53.72	
14	1	Kion Joseph	Barbados	54.34	
15	1	Luis Carlos Bonilla	Guatemala	57.16	

Final

Rank	Name	Nationality	Time	Notes
1st place, gold medalist(s)	Emmanuel Mayers	Trinidad and Tobago	49.72	
2nd place, silver medalist(s)	Jeffery Gibson	Bahamas	49.94	
3rd place, bronze medalist(s)	Amaurys Valle	Cuba	50.02	
4	Roxroy Cato	Jamaica	50.05	
5	Eric Alejandro	Puerto Rico	50.62	
6	Jamele Mason	Puerto Rico	50.65	
7	Isa Phillips	Jamaica	51.24	
8	Winder Cuevas	Dominican Republic	51.38	

=== 3000 meters steeplechase ===
Rank	Name	Nationality	Time	Notes
1st place, gold medalist(s)	Javier Quintana	Mexico	9:17.56	
2nd place, silver medalist(s)	Luis Enrique Ibarra	Mexico	9:27.92	
3rd place, bronze medalist(s)	Álvaro Abreu	Dominican Republic	9:42.51	
4	Miguel Ángel Chan	Guatemala	9:54.85	

=== 4 × 100 meters relay ===
Heats

Rank	Heat	Nation	Competitors	Time	Notes
1	2	Bahamas		38.92	Q
2	1	Trinidad and Tobago		39.03	Q
3	1	Jamaica		39.15	Q
4	1	Barbados		39.18	Q
5	2	Puerto Rico		39.38	Q
6	2	Saint Kitts and Nevis		39.68	Q
7	1	Mexico		40.05	q
8	2	Cayman Islands		40.27	q

Final

Rank	Nation	Competitors	Time	Notes
1st place, gold medalist(s)	Bahamas	Adrian Griffith, Jamial Rolle, Trevorvano Mackey, Shavez Hart	38.77	NR
2nd place, silver medalist(s)	Jamaica	Oshane Bailey, Andrew Fisher, Jermaine Brown, Jason Livermore	38.86	
3rd place, bronze medalist(s)	Trinidad and Tobago	Jamol James, Ayodele Taffe, Jereem Richards, Emmanuel Callender	39.26	
4	Barbados	Nicholas Deshong, Levi Cadogan, Shane Brathwaite, Andrew Hinds	39.56	
5	Puerto Rico	Enrique Llanos, Miguel López, Carlos Rodríguez, Christian Reeves	39.72	
6	Saint Kitts and Nevis	Allistar Clarke, Jason Rogers, Antoine Adams, Delwayne Delaney	39.82	
7	Mexico	César Ramírez, Juan Carlos Alanis, Julián Tamez, Alexis Viera	40.49	
8	Cayman Islands	Rhymeich Adolphus, David Hamil, Carl Morgan, Tyrell Cuffy	40.63	

=== 4 × 400 meters relay ===
Rank	Nation	Competitors	Time	Notes
1st place, gold medalist(s)	Trinidad and Tobago	Renny Quow, Emmanuel Mayers, Machel Cedenio, Jarrin Solomon	3:02.19	
2nd place, silver medalist(s)	Bahamas	Latoy Williams, O'Jay Ferguson, Jeffery Gibson, Wesley Neymour	3:02.66	
3rd place, bronze medalist(s)	Dominican Republic	Arismendy Peguero, Gustavo Cuesta, Félix Sánchez, Luguelín Santos	3:02.82	
4	Cuba	Noel Ruíz, Orestes Rodríguez, Yoandys Lescay, Raidel Acea	3:03.17	
5	Jamaica	Allodin Fothergill, Dane Hyatt, Dwayne Barret, Omar Johnson	3:03.69	
6	Costa Rica	Jarlex Lynch, Gary Robinson, Gerald Drummond, Nery Brenes	3:08.77	NR
7	Mexico	Orlando García, José de Jesús Fraire, Oscar Ramírez, José Fernando Martínez	3:10.38	
8	Puerto Rico	Héctor Carrasquillo, Eric Alejandro, Félix Martínez, Carlos Rodríguez	3:12.15	

=== 20 kilometers walk ===
Rank	Name	Nationality	Time	Notes
1st place, gold medalist(s)	Jorge Alejandro Martínez	Mexico	1:27:17	
2nd place, silver medalist(s)	Julio César Salazar	Mexico	1:29:51	
3rd place, bronze medalist(s)	Allan Segura	Costa Rica	1:39:14	
4	Salvador Mira	El Salvador	1:42:44	

=== High jump ===
Rank	Name	Nationality	Result	Notes
1st place, gold medalist(s)	Darrell Garwood	Jamaica	2.22	
2nd place, silver medalist(s)	Jamal Wilson	Bahamas	2.22	
3rd place, bronze medalist(s)	Arturo Abascal	Mexico	2.10	
4	Domanique Missick	Turks and Caicos Islands	2.10	
4	Brendan Williams	Dominica	2.10	
6	Enrique Esquer	Mexico	2.00	
7	Keron Stoute	British Virgin Islands	1.95	
	Donald Thomas	Bahamas	NM	
	Ryan Ingraham*	Bahamas	2.25	

=== Pole vault ===
Rank	Name	Nationality	Result	Notes
1st place, gold medalist(s)	Raúl Ríos	Mexico	5.10	
2nd place, silver medalist(s)	Víctor Castillero	Mexico	4.80	
3rd place, bronze medalist(s)	Jorge Montes	Dominican Republic	4.65	
4	Yeisel Cintrón	Puerto Rico	4.65	

=== Long jump ===
Rank	Name	Nationality	Result	Notes
1st place, gold medalist(s)	Alberto Álvarez	Mexico	7.85	
2nd place, silver medalist(s)	Eddy Florian	Dominican Republic	7.80	
3rd place, bronze medalist(s)	Kiron Blaise	Trinidad and Tobago	7.73	
4	Jermaine Jackson	Jamaica	7.72	
5	Nicholas Gordon	Jamaica	7.59	
6	Rudon Bastian	Bahamas	7.55	
7	Abraham Rodríguez	Mexico	7.31	
8	Jason Castro	Honduras	7.30	
9	Bavon Sylvain	Dominica	7.11	
10	David Registe	Dominica	7.02	
11	Dwain Herbert	Trinidad and Tobago	6.99	
	Charles Graves	Barbados	NM	
	Carl Morgan	Cayman Islands	NM	

=== Triple jump ===
Rank	Name	Nationality	Result	Notes
1st place, gold medalist(s)	Yordanys Durañona	Dominica	16.45	
2nd place, silver medalist(s)	Alberto Álvarez	Mexico	16.39	
3rd place, bronze medalist(s)	Christopher Hercules	Trinidad and Tobago	16.00	
4	Kiron Blaise	Trinidad and Tobago	15.82	
5	Jair Cadenas	Mexico	15.75	
6	Wilbert Walker	Jamaica	15.73	
7	Cameron Parker	Bahamas	15.67	
8	Jason Castro	Honduras	15.16	
9	Charles Graves	Barbados	15.09	

=== Shot put ===
Rank	Name	Nationality	Result	Notes
1st place, gold medalist(s)	O'Dayne Richards	Jamaica	20.97	CR
2nd place, silver medalist(s)	Josué Santana	Mexico	17.74	
3rd place, bronze medalist(s)	Mario Cota	Mexico	17.67	
4	Akeem Stewart	Trinidad and Tobago	17.12	
5	Luis Folgar	Guatemala	15.32	
6	Miguel Estrada	Guatemala	14.26	

=== Discus throw ===
Rank	Name	Nationality	Result	Notes
1st place, gold medalist(s)	Chad Wright	Jamaica	60.79	
2nd place, silver medalist(s)	Mario Cota	Mexico	58.58	
3rd place, bronze medalist(s)	Quincy Wilson	Trinidad and Tobago	55.83	
4	Rafael Ochoa	Mexico	50.66	
5	Dillon Simon	Dominica	49.36	
6	Ever Acajabón	Guatemala	40.17	

=== Hammer throw ===
Rank	Name	Nationality	Result	Notes
1st place, gold medalist(s)	Roberto Sawyers	Costa Rica	68.92	
2nd place, silver medalist(s)	Diego del Real	Mexico	65.35	
3rd place, bronze medalist(s)	Diego Berríos	Guatemala	61.88	
4	José Gatica	Mexico	61.19	
5	Wilfredo de Jesús	Puerto Rico	59.22	
6	Alexis Figueroa	Puerto Rico	57.80	

=== Javelin throw ===
Rank	Name	Nationality	Result	Notes
1st place, gold medalist(s)	Carlos Armenta	Mexico	72.49	
2nd place, silver medalist(s)	Alexander Pascal	Cayman Islands	71.85	
3rd place, bronze medalist(s)	José Lagunes	Mexico	69.64	
4	Emron Gibbs	Grenada	68.12	
5	Orrin Powell	Jamaica	67.10	

=== Decathlon ===
The highest mark recorded in each event is highlighted in yellow

Rank	Athlete	Nationality	100m	LJ	SP	HJ	400m	110m H	DT	PV	JT	1500m	Points	Notes
1st place, gold medalist(s)	Rodrigo Sagaón	Mexico	11.23w	6.41	11.77	1.80	48.94	15.64	39.17	4.50	56.48	4:57.59	7011	
2nd place, silver medalist(s)	Jorge Rivera	Mexico	11.60w	6.65	12.18	2.01	50.69	15.72	39.83	4.30	45.89	5:22.03	6773	
3rd place, bronze medalist(s)	Josué Louis	Haiti	11.24w	7.00	12.63	2.04	52.61	14.48	38.28	2.70	53.43	5:41.43	6619	
4	Juan de la Cruz	Dominican Republic	11.44w	6.36	12.39	1.89	50.87	15.49	29.74	4.10	48.12	5:05.09	6528	

== Women's results ==
=== 100 meters ===
Heats
Wind:
Heat 1: +0.3 m/s, Heat 2: +1.2 m/s, Heat 3: +1.2 m/s

Rank	Heat	Name	Nationality	Time	Notes
1	2	Aleen Bailey	Jamaica	11.31	Q
2	2	Cache Armbrister	Bahamas	11.35	Q
3	1	Marielis Sánchez	Dominican Republic	11.37	Q
4	3	Fany Chalas	Dominican Republic	11.38	Q
4	1	Sheri-Ann Brooks	Jamaica	11.38	Q
6	3	Debbie Ferguson-McKenzie	Bahamas	11.42	Q
7	2	Semoy Hackett	Trinidad and Tobago	11.45	q
7	3	Omhunique Browne	Saint Kitts and Nevis	11.45	q
9	2	Genoiska Cancel	Puerto Rico	11.56	
10	1	Reyare Thomas	Trinidad and Tobago	11.71	
11	3	Jade Bailey	Barbados	11.74	
12	2	Iza Daniela Flores	Mexico	11.76	
13	1	Arantxa King	Bermuda	11.89	
14	3	Isabel Franz	Mexico	11.94	
15	3	Shantely Scott	Costa Rica	12.11	
16	2	Glenda Davis	Costa Rica	12.21	

Final
Wind:
+0.1 m/s

Rank	Name	Nationality	Time	Notes
1st place, gold medalist(s)	Sheri-Ann Brooks	Jamaica	11.21	
2nd place, silver medalist(s)	Marielis Sánchez	Dominican Republic	11.24	NR
3rd place, bronze medalist(s)	Aleen Bailey	Jamaica	11.34	
4	Fany Chalas	Dominican Republic	11.41	
5	Cache Armbrister	Bahamas	11.42	
6	Omhunique Browne	Saint Kitts and Nevis	11.68	
7	Debbie Ferguson-McKenzie	Bahamas	11.85	
	Semoy Hackett	Trinidad and Tobago	DQ	FS

=== 200 meters ===
Heats
Wind:
Heat 1: -0.2 m/s, Heat 2: -0.1 m/s, Heat 3: +0.2 m/s

Rank	Heat	Name	Nationality	Time	Notes
1	3	Kineke Alexander	Saint Vincent and the Grenadines	23.09	Q
2	1	Aleen Bailey	Jamaica	23.55	Q
3	2	Marielis Sánchez	Dominican Republic	23.60	Q
4	3	Karene King	British Virgin Islands	23.64	Q
5	1	Carol Rodríguez	Puerto Rico	23.77	Q
5	2	Michelle-Lee Ahye	Trinidad and Tobago	23.77	Q
5	3	Nivea Smith	Bahamas	23.77	q
8	3	Audrea Segree	Jamaica	23.79	q
9	3	Kadecia Baird	Guyana	23.79	
10	3	Omhunique Browne	Saint Kitts and Nevis	23.86	
11	2	Genoiska Cancel	Puerto Rico	24.02	
12	3	Jade Bailey	Barbados	24.21	
13	2	Iza Daniela Flores	Mexico	24.25	
14	1	Ashley Kelly	British Virgin Islands	24.30	
15	2	Ariel Jackson	Barbados	24.41	
16	1	Claudia Soberanes	Mexico	24.54	
17	1	Shantely Scott	Costa Rica	25.20	
18	2	Glenda Davis	Costa Rica	25.59	
19	2	Cache Armbrister	Bahamas	49.43	

Final
Wind:
-0.6 m/s

Rank	Name	Nationality	Time	Notes
1st place, gold medalist(s)	Kineke Alexander	Saint Vincent and the Grenadines	23.00	
2nd place, silver medalist(s)	Aleen Bailey	Jamaica	23.08	
3rd place, bronze medalist(s)	Marielis Sánchez	Dominican Republic	23.15	
4	Audrea Segree	Jamaica	23.39	
5	Karene King	British Virgin Islands	23.56	
6	Carol Rodríguez	Puerto Rico	23.69	
	Michelle-Lee Ahye	Trinidad and Tobago	DQ	FS
	Nivea Smith	Bahamas	DNS	

=== 400 meters ===
Heats

Rank	Heat	Name	Nationality	Time	Notes
1	3	Kineke Alexander	Saint Vincent and the Grenadines	52.33	Q
2	1	Kadecia Baird	Guyana	52.73	Q
3	3	Chrisann Gordon	Jamaica	52.78	Q
4	2	Gabriela Medina	Mexico	52.92	Q
5	2	Raysa Sánchez	Dominican Republic	53.32	Q
6	3	Carol Rodríguez	Puerto Rico	53.37	q
7	3	Shawna Fermin	Trinidad and Tobago	53.47	q
8	1	Bobby-Gaye Wilkins	Jamaica	53.75	Q
9	2	Grace Claxton	Puerto Rico	53.98	
10	2	Sade Sealy	Barbados	54.09	
11	2	Lanece Clarke	Bahamas	54.38	
12	3	Claudia Soberanes	Mexico	54.43	
13	3	Samantha Edwards	Antigua and Barbuda	54.44	
14	1	Ramona Modeste	Trinidad and Tobago	54.52	
15	1	Amara Jones	Bahamas	54.63	
16	1	Sharolyn Scott	Costa Rica	54.73	
17	1	Arielle Fonrose	Haiti	56.31	

Final

Rank	Name	Nationality	Time	Notes
1st place, gold medalist(s)	Kadecia Baird	Guyana	51.32	
2nd place, silver medalist(s)	Chrisann Gordon	Jamaica	52.52	
3rd place, bronze medalist(s)	Kineke Alexander	Saint Vincent and the Grenadines	52.81	
4	Gabriela Medina	Mexico	52.90	
5	Bobby-Gaye Wilkins	Jamaica	53.01	
6	Shawna Fermin	Trinidad and Tobago	53.16	
7	Carol Rodríguez	Puerto Rico	53.81	
8	Raysa Sánchez	Dominican Republic	54.19	

=== 800 meters ===
Rank	Name	Nationality	Time	Notes
1st place, gold medalist(s)	Natoya Goule	Jamaica	2:02.02	
2nd place, silver medalist(s)	Simoya Campbell	Jamaica	2:03.08	
3rd place, bronze medalist(s)	Rose Mary Almanza	Cuba	2:03.10	
4	Gabriela Medina	Mexico	2:03.11	
5	Teshon Adderley	Bahamas	2:06.65	
6	Gladys Landaverde	El Salvador	2:10.46	
7	Verónica Cibrian	Mexico	2:11.39	
8	Michelle López	Puerto Rico	2:12.00	
9	Jocelyn Keen	Dominican Republic	2:14.87	
10	Dominique Williams	Trinidad and Tobago	2:17.45	

=== 1500 meters ===
Rank	Name	Nationality	Time	Notes
1st place, gold medalist(s)	Brenda Flores	Mexico	4:27.55	
2nd place, silver medalist(s)	Adriana Muñoz	Cuba	4:31.79	
3rd place, bronze medalist(s)	Alejandra Silis	Mexico	4:32.06	
4	María Mancebo	Dominican Republic	4:39.36	
5	Jocelyn Keen	Dominican Republic	5:00.88	
6	Tamika Williams	Bermuda	5:04.14	

=== 5000 meters ===
Rank	Name	Nationality	Time	Notes
1st place, gold medalist(s)	Marisol Romero	Mexico	16:04.93	
2nd place, silver medalist(s)	Brenda Flores	Mexico	17:11.89	
3rd place, bronze medalist(s)	Élida Hernández	Guatemala	18:17.55	
4	Xiomara Barrera	El Salvador	18:47.82	

=== 10,000 meters ===
Rank	Name	Nationality	Time	Notes
1st place, gold medalist(s)	Kathia García	Mexico	35:19.92	
2nd place, silver medalist(s)	Daniela Alonso	Mexico	36:05.94	
3rd place, bronze medalist(s)	Élida Hernández	Guatemala	37:44.35	
4	Dina Cruz	Guatemala	37:56.75	
5	Xiomara Barrera	El Salvador	39:45.01	
	Martha Vázquez*	Mexico	35:49.23	
	Violeta Gómez*	Mexico	37:14.57	

=== 100 meters hurdles ===
Wind: -1.5 m/s

Rank	Name	Nationality	Time	Notes
1st place, gold medalist(s)	Monique Morgan	Jamaica	13.25	
2nd place, silver medalist(s)	Kierre Beckles	Barbados	13.37	
3rd place, bronze medalist(s)	LaVonne Idlette	Dominican Republic	13.41	
4	Aleesha Barber	Trinidad and Tobago	13.44	
5	Indira Spence	Jamaica	13.49	
6	Alejandra Cárdenas	Mexico	13.97	
7	Georgina Tamez	Mexico	13.97	

=== 400 meters hurdles ===
Rank	Name	Nationality	Time	Notes
1st place, gold medalist(s)	Danielle Dowie	Jamaica	56.39	
2nd place, silver medalist(s)	Sharolyn Scott	Costa Rica	57.74	
3rd place, bronze medalist(s)	Zudikey Rodríguez	Mexico	58.12	
4	Fabiola Juárez	Mexico	1:00.76	

=== 3000 meters steeplechase ===
Rank	Name	Nationality	Time	Notes
1st place, gold medalist(s)	Azucena Ríos	Mexico	10:56.55	
2nd place, silver medalist(s)	María Mancebo	Dominican Republic	11:09.21	
3rd place, bronze medalist(s)	Elisa Hernández	Mexico	11:20.28	
4	Evonne Marroquín	Guatemala	12:18.06	
	Ashley Berry	Bermuda	DNF	

=== 4 × 100 meters relay ===
Rank	Nation	Competitors	Time	Notes
1st place, gold medalist(s)	Jamaica	Elaine Thompson, Nadine Palmer, Aleen Bailey, Sheri-Ann Brooks	43.58	
2nd place, silver medalist(s)	Trinidad and Tobago	Kamaria Durant, Kai Selvon, Reyare Thomas, Michelle-Lee Ahye	43.67	
3rd place, bronze medalist(s)	Bahamas	Tyla Carter, Cache Armbrister, Debbie Ferguson-McKenzie, Nivea Smith	44.08	
4	Dominican Republic	Marielis Sánchez, Fany Chalas, Marleny Mejía, Margarita Manzueta	44.12	
5	Mexico	Mayra Hermosillo, Isabel Franz, Melissa Flores, Iza Daniela Flores	45.72	
	British Virgin Islands	Britney Wattley, Karene King, Ashley Kelly, Chantel Malone	DNF	

=== 4 × 400 meters relay ===
Rank	Nation	Competitors	Time	Notes
1st place, gold medalist(s)	Trinidad and Tobago	Shawna Fermin, Sparkle McKnight, Ramona Modeste, Alena Brooks	3:30.64	NR
2nd place, silver medalist(s)	Mexico	Mariel Espinosa, Zudikey Rodríguez, Claudia Soberanes, Gabriela Medina	3:34.52	
3rd place, bronze medalist(s)	Bahamas	Shakeithra Henfield, Lanece Clarke, Miriam Byfield, Amara Jones	3:36.41	
4	Puerto Rico	Grace Claxton, Carol Rodríguez, Genoiska Cancel, Michelle López	3:38.13	
	Jamaica	Bobby-Gaye Wilkins, Chrisann Gordon, Natoya Goule, Kayon Robinson	DQ	

=== 10,000 meters walk ===
Rank	Name	Nationality	Time	Notes
1st place, gold medalist(s)	María Guadalupe González	Mexico	47:48.30	
2nd place, silver medalist(s)	Milangela Rosales	Venezuela	49:27.10	
3rd place, bronze medalist(s)	Zayra Jáuregui	Mexico	50:00.90	
4	Cristina López	El Salvador	52:23.40	

=== High jump ===
Rank	Name	Nationality	Result	Notes
1st place, gold medalist(s)	Levern Spencer	Saint Lucia	1.95	CR
2nd place, silver medalist(s)	Jeanelle Scheper	Saint Lucia	1.92	
3rd place, bronze medalist(s)	Saniel Atkinson-Grier	Jamaica	1.84	
4	Romary Rifka	Mexico	1.78	
5	Gloria Maldonado	Mexico	1.75	
6	Shinelle Proctor	Anguilla	1.70	

=== Pole vault ===
Rank	Name	Nationality	Result	Notes
1st place, gold medalist(s)	Carmelita Correa	Mexico	3.95	
2nd place, silver medalist(s)	Tiziana Ruiz	Mexico	3.90	
3rd place, bronze medalist(s)	Alexandra González	Puerto Rico	3.85	
4	Diamara Planell	Puerto Rico	3.85	
5	Andrea Velasco	El Salvador	3.25	

=== Long jump ===
Rank	Name	Nationality	Result	Notes
1st place, gold medalist(s)	Francine Simpson	Jamaica	6.49	
2nd place, silver medalist(s)	Arantxa King	Bermuda	6.45	
3rd place, bronze medalist(s)	Bianca Stuart	Bahamas	6.42	
4	Chantel Malone	British Virgin Islands	6.35	
5	Todea-Kay Willis	Jamaica	6.32	
6	Ivonne Treviño	Mexico	6.04	
7	Tamara Myers	Bahamas	5.79	
8	Chrystal Ruiz	Mexico	5.77	
9	Ayanna Alexander	Trinidad and Tobago	5.70	
10	Ismeralys Piesimonn	Dominican Republic	5.63	
11	Ana Lucia Camargo	Guatemala	5.39	
12	Estefany Cruz	Guatemala	5.34	

=== Triple jump ===
Rank	Name	Nationality	Result	Notes
1st place, gold medalist(s)	Tamara Myers	Bahamas	13.18	
2nd place, silver medalist(s)	Ayanna Alexander	Trinidad and Tobago	13.17	
3rd place, bronze medalist(s)	Liliana Hernández	Mexico	12.90	
4	Rita Rosado	Mexico	12.40	
5	Jasmine Brunson	Bermuda	12.26	
6	Estefany Cruz	Guatemala	11.91	
7	Ana Lucia Camargo	Guatemala	11.89	

=== Shot put ===
Rank	Name	Nationality	Result	Notes
1st place, gold medalist(s)	Cleopatra Borel-Brown	Trinidad and Tobago	17.56	
2nd place, silver medalist(s)	Cecilia Dzul	Mexico	16.33	
3rd place, bronze medalist(s)	Laura Pulido	Mexico	15.69	
4	Melissa Alfred	Dominica	13.15	

=== Discus throw ===
Rank	Name	Nationality	Result	Notes
1st place, gold medalist(s)	Allison Randall	Jamaica	55.26	
2nd place, silver medalist(s)	Paulina Flores	Mexico	50.16	
3rd place, bronze medalist(s)	Irais Estrada	Mexico	49.84	
4	Melissa Alfred	Dominica	42.73	

=== Hammer throw ===
Rank	Name	Nationality	Result	Notes
1st place, gold medalist(s)	Samantha Hernández	Mexico	54.27	
2nd place, silver medalist(s)	Yolanda González	Mexico	54.26	

=== Javelin throw ===
Rank	Name	Nationality	Result	Notes
1st place, gold medalist(s)	Coralis Ortiz	Puerto Rico	57.48	
2nd place, silver medalist(s)	Betzabet Menéndez	Mexico	48.90	
3rd place, bronze medalist(s)	Diana Martínez	Mexico	47.40	

=== Heptathlon ===
The highest mark recorded in each event is highlighted in yellow

Rank	Athlete	Nationality	100m H	HJ	SP	200m	LJ	JT	800m	Points	Notes
1st place, gold medalist(s)	Chrystal Ruiz	Mexico	14.11	1.69	10.00	24.69	5.95	33.15	2:18.19	5467	
2nd place, silver medalist(s)	Shianne Smith	Bermuda	14.27	1.54	11.69	24.77	5.24	36.79	2:19.24	5222	
3rd place, bronze medalist(s)	Milagros Montes de Oca	Dominican Republic	14.42	1.60	10.52	25.75	5.32	41.71	2:20.49	5204	
4	Jessamyn Sauceda	Mexico	14.63	1.66	11.10	25.28	5.66	32.89	2:27.38	5164	
5	Alysbeth Felix	Puerto Rico	14.75	1.75	8.75	25.41	5.89	33.48	2:36.18	5065	
6	Kanishque Todman	British Virgin Islands	15.26	1.51	9.38	26.73	5.45	23.83	2:48.55	4188	
	Ruth Morales	Guatemala	15.93	1.57	8.45	26.38	4.59	30.55	DNS	DNF	
