= Harold Houston =

Bermudian athlete

Personal information
- Nickname: Tre
- Born: 23 March 1990 (age 36) Charleston, South Carolina, United States
- Height: 1.78 m (5 ft 10 in)
- Weight: 79 kg (174 lb)

Sport
- Sport: Athletics
- Events: 100 m, 200 m

Harold "Tre" Houston (born 23 March 1990) is a Bermudian sprinter who specializes in the 100 and 200 metres. Houston competed in the 200 metres at the 2015 World Championships in Beijing without advancing from the first round. A year later Houston would compete at the 2016 Olympic Games in Rio de Janeiro. Houston, who qualified with a personal best of 20.42, would go on to place sixth in his heat with a time of 20.85. Houston's appearance in the 200 meters would mark the first time in over 20 years Bermuda had been represented in the event.

== Competition record ==
Year	Competition	Venue	Position	Event	Notes
Representing Bermuda
2005	CARIFTA Games (U17)	Bacolet, Trinidad and Tobago	13th (h)	100 m	11.49
2005	CARIFTA Games (U17)	Bacolet, Trinidad and Tobago	11th (h)	200 m	23.05
2006	CARIFTA Games (U17)	Les Abymes, Guadeloupe	10th (h)	100 m	11.19
2006	CARIFTA Games (U17)	Les Abymes, Guadeloupe	8th (h)	200 m	22.50
2006	Central American and Caribbean; Junior Championships (U17)	Port of Spain, Trinidad and Tobago	10th (h)	100 m	11.20
2006	Central American and Caribbean; Junior Championships (U17)	Port of Spain, Trinidad and Tobago	5th	200 m	21.94
2007	CARIFTA Games (U20)	Providenciales, Turks and Caicos Islands	10th (h)	100 m	10.75
2007	CARIFTA Games (U20)	Providenciales, Turks and Caicos Islands	12th (h)	200 m	21.92 (w)
2007	World Youth Championships	Ostrava, Czech Republic	15th (sf)	100 m	10.97
2007	World Youth Championships	Ostrava, Czech Republic	16th (sf)	200 m	21.87
2008	CARIFTA Games (U20)	Basseterre, Saint Kitts and Nevis	7th	100 m	10.70
2008	CARIFTA Games (U20)	Basseterre, Saint Kitts and Nevis	–	200 m	DQ
2008	CARIFTA Games (U20)	Basseterre, Saint Kitts and Nevis	7th	4 × 400 m	3:20.93
2008	World Junior Championships	Bydgoszcz, Poland	46th (h)	100 m	10.92
2008	World Junior Championships	Bydgoszcz, Poland	45th (h)	200 m	22.10
2009	CARIFTA Games (U20)	Vieux Fort, Saint Lucia	11th (h)	100 m	10.75 (w)
2009	CARIFTA Games (U20)	Vieux Fort, Saint Lucia	4th	200 m	21.30 (w)
2009	Central American and Caribbean Championships	Havana, Cuba	25th (h)	100 m	10.86
2009	Central American and Caribbean Championships	Havana, Cuba	19th (h)	200 m	21.69
2009	Pan American Junior Championships	Port of Spain, Trinidad and Tobago	11th (h)	200 m	21.57
2010	NACAC U23 Championships	Miramar, United States	14th (h)	100 m	10.88
2010	NACAC U23 Championships	Miramar, United States	7th (h)	200 m	21.04
2010	Commonwealth Games	Delhi, India	17th (qf)	100 m	10.45
2010	Commonwealth Games	Delhi, India	11th (sf)	200 m	21.25
2011	Central American and Caribbean Championships	Mayagüez, Puerto Rico	–	100 m	DQ
2011	Central American and Caribbean Championships	Mayagüez, Puerto Rico	17th (h)	200 m	21.47
2011	Pan American Games	Guadalajara, Mexico	11th (h)	100 m	10.40^{1}
2012	NACAC U23 Championships	Irapuato, Mexico	12th (h)	100 m	10.48
2012	NACAC U23 Championships	Irapuato, Mexico	7th	200 m	20.96
2013	Central American and Caribbean Championships	Morelia, Mexico	22nd (h)	100 m	10.58
2013	Central American and Caribbean Championships	Morelia, Mexico	16th (h)	200 m	21.37
2014	Commonwealth Games	Glasgow, United Kingdom	38th (h)	100 m	10.72
2014	Commonwealth Games	Glasgow, United Kingdom	41st (h)	200 m	21.39
2015	Pan American Games	Toronto, Canada	21st (h)	200 m	21.00
2015	NACAC Championships	San José, Costa Rica	19th (h)	100 m	10.47
2015	NACAC Championships	San José, Costa Rica	19th (sf)	200 m	21.72
2015	World Championships	Beijing, China	44th (h)	200 m	20.92
2016	Olympic Games	Rio de Janeiro, Brazil	63rd (h)	200 m	20.85
2018	Commonwealth Games	Gold Coast, Australia	40th (h)	200 m	21.67

^{1}Disqualified in the semifinals

== Personal bests ==
Outdoor

- 100 metres – 10.28 (+1.6 m/s, Leonara, Guyana 2016)
- 200 metres – 20.42 (+0.9 m/s, San Marcos 2015)
- 400 metres – 48.51 (Houston, Texas USA 2015)

Indoor

- 60 metres – 6.79 (Houston, Texas USA)
- 200 metres – 21.44 (College Station, Texas USA)
