= Athletics at the 2011 Pan American Games – Men's 4 × 400 metres relay =

Men's 4 × 400 metres relay at the 2011 Pan American Games
- Venue: Telmex Athletics Stadium
- Dates: October 27–28
- Competitors: 41 from 9 nations

Medalists
Gold medal	Noel Ruíz, Raidel Acea, Omar Cisneros, William Collazo, Júnior Díaz, Amaurys Valle	Cuba
Silver medal	Arismendy Peguero, Luguelín Santos, Yoel Tapia, Gustavo Cuesta	Dominican Republic
Bronze medal	Arturo Ramírez, Alberto Aguilar, José Acevedo, Omar Longart	Venezuela

The men's 4 × 400 metres relay competition of the athletics events at the 2011 Pan American Games took place on the 27 and 28 October at the Telmex Athletics Stadium. The defending Pan American Games champion were Andrae Williams, Avard Moncur, Michael Matheau and Chris Brown of Bahamas.

== Records ==
Prior to this competition, the existing world and Pan American Games records were as follows:

World record	United States	2.54.29	Stuttgart, Germany	August 22, 1993
Pan American Games record	Jamaica	2.57.97	Winnipeg, Canada	July 30, 1999

== Qualification ==
Each National Olympic Committee (NOC) was able to enter one team.

== Schedule ==
Date	Time	Round
October 27, 2011	15:35	Semifinals
October 28, 2011	18:50	Final

== Results ==
All times shown are in seconds.

KEY:	q	Fastest non-qualifiers	Q	Qualified	NR	National record	PB	Personal best	SB	Seasonal best	DQ	Disqualified

=== Semifinals ===
The semifinals were held on October 27. Qualification: First 3 teams of each heat (Q) plus the next 2 fastest (q) qualified for the final.

Rank	Heat	Nation	Athletes	Time	Notes
1	2	Cuba	Júnior Díaz, Noel Ruíz, Amaurys Valle, William Collazo	3:04.33	Q, SB
2	2	Venezuela	Arturo Ramírez, Alberto Aguilar, José Acevedo, Omar Longart	3:04.67	Q, SB
3	1	Dominican Republic	Gustavo Cuesta, Arismendy Peguero, Yoel Tapia, Luguelín Santos	3:06.33	Q
4	2	United States	Bryan Miller, Jeremy Dodson, Perrisan White, Joshua Scott	3:07.57	Q
5	1	Canada	Philip Osei, Dontae Richards, Tremaine Harris, Michael Robertson	3:08.51	Q
6	2	Bahamas	Wesley Neymour, Chris Brown, Jamial Rolle, Ramon Miller	3:09.68	q
7	1	Jamaica	Michael Mason, Omar Johnson, Annert Whyte, Jason Livermore	3:10.05	Q
8	1	Mexico	José Luis Ceballos, Orlando Garcia, Juan Stenner, Jorge Alonzo	3:12.18	q
	2	Belize	Kenneth Medwood, Jayson Jones, Linford Avila, Kenneth Brackett	DNF	

=== Final ===
Held on October 28.

Rank	Nation	Athletes	Time	Notes
1st place, gold medalist(s)	Cuba	Noel Ruíz, Raidel Acea, Omar Cisneros, William Collazo	2:59.43	SB
2nd place, silver medalist(s)	Dominican Republic	Arismendy Peguero, Luguelín Santos, Yoel Tapia, Gustavo Cuesta	3:00.44	SB
3rd place, bronze medalist(s)	Venezuela	Arturo Ramírez, Alberto Aguilar, José Acevedo, Omar Longart	3:00.82	SB
4	United States	Joshua Scott, Bryan Miller, Lee Moore, Reuben McCoy	3:03.91	
5	Canada	Philip Osei, Dontae Richards, Tremaine Harris, Michael Robertson	3:07.12	SB
6	Mexico	José Luis Ceballos, José Juan Esparza, Juan Stenner, Orlando Garcia	3:11.52	
