= 2012 NACAC U23 Championships in Athletics =

VII NACAC Under-23 Championships
- Dates: 6 – 8 July
- Host city: Irapuato, Mexico
- Venue: Centro Paralímpico Nacional
- Level: Under-23
- Events: 44
- Participation: 303 athletes from 23 nations
- Records set: 11 Championship records

The 2012 NACAC Under-23 Championships in Athletics were held at the Centro Paralímpico Nacional in Irapuato, Mexico from 6 to 8 July. It was the seventh edition of the biennial athletics competition for NACAC area athletes under 23 years of age. A total of 44 track and field events were contested, divided evenly between the sexes. It was the third time that Mexico had hosted the event, having done so in 2000 and 2008.

Over 400 athletes from 23 nations competed at the championships. Eleven championship records were broken at the competition, with particularly strong performances in the sprint events. Jason Rogers equalled the 100 metres record while Auriyall Scott improved the women's time. Kimberlyn Duncan and Rebecca Alexander made it an American sweep of the women's sprints with two more records.

Shane Brathwaite won the men's 110 metres hurdles with a record run of 13.31 seconds. Jamaica's Traves Smikle gave a strong performance in the discus throw, becoming the first athlete to clear sixty metres in the history of the meet. Amanda Bingson added more than four metres to the women's hammer throw record, while Mexico's Abigail Gomez claimed the javelin throw record for the host nation.

The United States was dominant at the competition, winning all but five of the women's titles. Mexico managed five gold medals and Canada had the third most wins with four golds. Sixteen nations reached the medal table

== Medal summary ==
=== Men ===
Event	Gold		Silver		Bronze	
100 metres (Wind: 0.9 m/s)	Jason Rogers (SKN)	10.06 =CR	Keenan Brock (USA)	10.15	Charles Silmon (USA)	10.17
200 metres (Wind: -0.5 m/s)	Tremaine Harris (CAN)	20.22	Prezel Hardy (USA)	20.40	Keith Ricks (USA)	20.50
400 metres	David Verburg (USA)	45.14	Philip Osei (CAN)	45.51	Jeffery Gibson (BAH)	46.30
800 metres	Michael Preble (USA)	1:48.69	Tayron Reyes (DOM)	1:49.09	Casimir Loxsom (USA)	1:49.35
1500 metres	Kyle Merber (USA)	3:51.61	Charles Philibert-Thiboutot (CAN)	3:52.00	Riley Masters (USA)	3:52.15
5000 metres	Andrew Bayer (USA)	15:13.01	George Alex (USA)	15:28.27	Ezau Arias (MEX)	15:33.29
10,000 metres	Gabe Proctor (USA)	30:46.85	Elliott Krause (USA)	30:57.88	Alejandro Arroyo (MEX)	31:39.99
110 metres hurdles (Wind: 1.8 m/s)	Shane Brathwaite (BAR)	13.31 CR	Barrett Nugent (USA)	13.32	Greggmar Swift (BAR)	13.54
400 metres hurdles	Jeffery Gibson (BAH)	50.27	Michael Stigler (USA)	50.48	Leslie Murray (ISV)	50.48
3000 metres steeplechase	Luis Gallegos (MEX)	9:22.75	Jared Bassett (USA)	9:23.39	Javier Quintana (MEX)	9:23.44
4×100 metres relay	United States (USA); Darrell Wesh; Charles Silmon; Marcus Rowland; Keenan Brock	38.94	Bahamas (BAH); Trevorvano Mackey; Warren Fraser; Marcus Thompson; Alfred Higgs	39.65	Jamaica (JAM); Paul McPearson; Ramone McKenzie; Akheem Gauntlett; Akino Ming	39.67
4×400 metres relay	United States (USA); James Harris; Chris Vaughn; Michael Preble; David Verburg	3:03.81	Bahamas (BAH); Alfred Higgs; Danzell Forston; Jeffery Gibson; Alonzo Russell	3:04.33	Dominican Republic (DOM); Junior Acosta; Tayron Reyes; Jonathan Santana; Joel Mejia	3:07.88
20,000 metres walk	Evan Dunfee (CAN)	1:26:15.32 CR	Adrian Ochoa (MEX)	1:27:56.18	Mauricio Calvo (CRC)	1:31:58.42
High jump	Edgar Rivera (MEX)	2.23 m	Luis Joel Castro (PUR)	2.21 m	Domanique Missick (TCA)	2.19 m
Pole vault	Michael Woepse (USA)	5.40 m	K'Don Samuels (JAM)	5.35 m NR	Logan Cunningham (USA)	5.30 m
Long jump	Marquis Dendy (USA)	7.68 m (Wind: -1.2 m/s)	Kendall Spencer (USA)	7.67 m (Wind: -0.4 m/s)	Taylor Stewart (CAN)	7.50 m (Wind: -0.9 m/s)
Triple jump	Chris Phipps (USA)	16.19 m (Wind: 1.2 m/s)	Chris Benard (USA)	15.90 m (Wind: 0.8 m/s)	J'Vente Deveaux (BAH)	15.90 m (Wind: 0.9 m/s)
Shot put	Jacob Thormaehlen (USA)	19.86 m	Stephen Saenz (MEX)	19.31 m	Hayden Baillio (USA)	19.21 m
Discus throw	Traves Smikle (JAM)	62.11 m CR	Mason Finley (USA)	59.00 m	Quincy Wilson (TRI)	57.98 m
Hammer throw	Jeremy Postin (USA)	68.32 m	Alex Faldermeyer (USA)	65.41 m	Ricardo Castilleja (MEX)	58.09 m
Javelin throw	Tim Glover (USA)	78.28 m	Sam Humphreys (USA)	77.04 m	David Ocampo (MEX)	70.17 m
Decathlon	Jack Szmanda (USA)	7061 pts	Brent Vogel (USA)	6927 pts	Gustavo Morua (MEX)	6448 pts

=== Women ===
Event	Gold		Silver		Bronze	
100 metres (Wind: 1.6 m/s)	Aurieyall Scott (USA)	11.19 CR	Octavious Freeman (USA)	11.20	Crystal Emmanuel (CAN)	11.43
200 metres (Wind: 0.9 m/s)	Kimberlyn Duncan (USA)	22.72 CR	Allison Peter (ISV)	22.92	Cambrya Jones (USA)	23.00
400 metres	Rebecca Alexander (USA)	51.13 CR	Marlena Wesh (HAI)	51.23 NR	Jodi-Ann Muir (JAM)	52.44
800 metres	Chanelle Price (USA)	2:04.48	Annie LeBlanc (CAN)	2:05.61	Rachel Francois (CAN)	2:06.77
1500 metres	Jordan Hasay (USA)	4:22.16	Annie LeBlanc (CAN)	4:24.97	Karla Diaz (MEX)	4:27.66
5000 metres	Karla Diaz (MEX)	16:54.83	Jennifer Bergman (USA)	17:22.18	Dani Stack (USA)	18:07.87
10,000 metres	Sarah Callister (USA)	35:46.12 CR	Mayra Sanchez (MEX)	36:07.69	Katie Matthews (USA)	36:21.29
100 metres hurdles (Wind: +4.5 m/s)	Brianna Rollins (USA)	12.60	Kierre Beckles (BAR)	13.05	Ashlea Maddex (CAN)	13.21
400 metres hurdles	Cassandra Tate (USA)	55.62	Ellen Wortham (USA)	57.10	Danielle Dowie (JAM)	58.23
3000 metres steeplechase	Alyssa Kulik (USA)	10:21.04	Rebeka Stowe (USA)	10:45.14	Jessica Furlan (CAN)	10:51.26
4×100 metres relay	United States (USA); Cambrya Jones; Octavious Freeman; Aurieyall Scott; Kimberlyn Duncan	43.58	Bahamas (BAH); V'Alonee Robinson; Krystal Bodie; Ivanique Kemp; Amara Jones	45.71	Mexico (MEX); Mayra Hermilloso; Citlally Parra; Perla Sanchez; Maria Zamora	47.85
4×400 metres relay	United States (USA); Ellen Wortham; Rebecca Alexander; Cassandra Tate; Diamond Dixon	3:28.64	Trinidad and Tobago (TRI); Shawna Fermin; Alena Brooks; Jessica James; Sparkle McKnight	3:33.03	Jamaica (JAM); Yanique Haye; Danielle Dowie; Ladonna Richards; Jodi-Ann Muir	3:34.29
10,000 metres walk	Maria Irais Mena (MEX)	52:52.54	Rachael Tylock (USA)	53:16.59	Nichole Bonk (USA)	55:56.68
High jump	Tynita Butts (USA)	1.82 m	Michelle Theophille (CAN)	1.82 m	Allison Barwise (USA)	1.74 m
Pole vault	Melanie Blouin (CAN)	4.36 m CR	Logan Miller (USA)	4.25 m	Martha Villalobos (MEX)	3.60 m
Long jump	Christabel Nettey (CAN)	6.18 m (Wind: 0.8 m/s)	Sonnisha Williams (USA)	6.17 m (Wind: -0.4 m/s)	Elizabeth Lopez (MEX)	6.04 m (Wind: -0.2 m/s)
Triple jump	Andrea Geubelle (USA)	13.14 m (Wind: -0.9 m/s)	Michelle Jenije (USA)	13.13 m (Wind: -2.6 m/s)	Jasmine Brunsun (BER)	12.62 m (Wind: -1.2 m/s)
Shot put	Brittany Smith (USA)	17.03 m	Alyssa Hasslen (USA)	16.86 m	Taryn Suttie (CAN)	16.22 m
Discus throw	Anna Jelmini (USA)	53.93 m	Skylar White (USA)	50.60 m	Hilenn James (TRI)	48.90 m
Hammer throw	Amanda Bingson (USA)	71.39 m CR	Brittany Smith (USA)	67.10 m	Lauren Stuart (CAN)	56.35 m
Javelin throw	Abigail Gomez (MEX)	56.89 m CR, NR	Tiffany Perkins (CAN)	56.20 m	Alanna Kovacs (CAN)	51.70 m
Heptathlon	Kiani Profit (USA)	5653 pts	Jessica Flax (USA)	5544 pts	Makeba Alcide (LCA)	5522 pts

== Medal table (unofficial) ==
* Host nation (Mexico)

Rank	Nation	Gold	Silver	Bronze	Total
1	United States	31	25	11	67
2	Mexico*	5	3	10	18
3	Canada	4	6	8	18
4	Bahamas	1	3	2	6
5	Jamaica	1	1	4	6
6	Barbados	1	1	1	3
7	Saint Kitts and Nevis	1	0	0	1
Totals (7 entries)		44	39	36	119

== Participation ==
According to an unofficial count, 303 athletes from 23 countries participated.

- Anguilla (1)
- Antigua and Barbuda (2)
- Bahamas (18)
- Barbados (12)
- Bermuda (6)
- British Virgin Islands (3)
- Canada (39)
- Costa Rica (6)
- Dominican Republic (15)
- El Salvador (2)
- Haiti (1)
- Honduras (3)
- Jamaica (16)
- Mexico (73)
- Montserrat (1)
- Puerto Rico (1)
- Saint Kitts and Nevis (2)
- Saint Lucia (4)
- Saint Vincent and the Grenadines (1)
- Trinidad and Tobago (10)
- Turks and Caicos Islands (2)
- United States (79)
- U.S. Virgin Islands (6)
