= Ian Warner =

Canadian sprinter (born 1990)

Personal information
- Born: May 15, 1990 (age 36) Toronto, Ontario, Canada

Sport
- Sport: Running

Achievements and titles
- Personal best: 100m: 10.20s (Calgary 2012)
Medal record
Men's Athletics
Representing Canada

Ian Warner (born May 15, 1990) is a Canadian track athlete specializing in the 100 metres. Born in Toronto, Ontario, he is the younger brother of Justyn Warner.

On June 30, 2012, he finished second behind his brother on 100 meters at the 2012 Nationals Track & Field Championships in Calgary. He competed at the 2012 Summer Olympics in the Men's 4 x 100 metres relay event with his brother Justyn.

== Statistics ==
=== Personal bests ===
Event	Best	Location	Date
100m	10.20s	Calgary, Canada	June 29, 2012
60m	6.70s	Ames, United States	January 28, 2012

=== Competition record ===
Year	Competition	Venue	Position	Event	Notes
2007	World Youth Championships in Athletics	Ostrava, Czech Republic	7th	100m	10.81s
2012	NACAC U23 Championships	Irapuato, Mexico	6th	100m	10.30 (wind: +0.9 m/s) A
2012	NACAC U23 Championships	Irapuato, Mexico	4th	4 × 100 m relay	39.82 A
