= Darrell Wesh =

Haitian-American sprinter (born 1992)

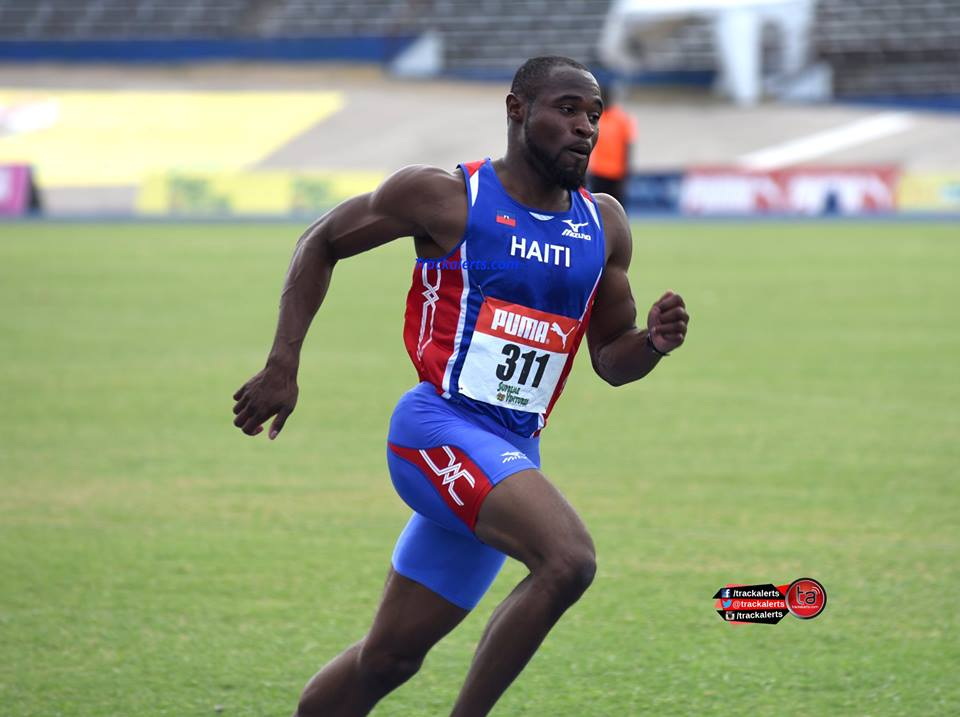
- Darrell Wesh in 2016

Personal information
- Born: 21 January 1992 (age 34)
- Education: Virginia Tech
- Height: 1.83 m (6 ft 0 in)
- Weight: 160 lb (73 kg)

Sport
- Country: Haiti and United States of America
- Sport: Athletics
- Events: 100 m, 200 m
- College team: Virginia Tech Hokies

Darrell Wesh (born 21 January 1992) is a Haitian-American athlete competing in sprinting events. Earlier he represented the United States. He is the Haitian 100m record holder at 10.16 seconds. He graduated from Landstown High School in Virginia Beach, Virginia in 2010 and Virginia Tech in 2015, earning a degree in property management. He competed in the 2016 Olympics for Haiti.

His sister Marlena is also a sprinter.He likes to ride unicycles in his free time.

== Competition record ==
Year	Competition	Venue	Position	Event	Notes
Representing the United States
2012	NACAC U23 Championships	Irapuato, Mexico	1st	4 × 100 m relay	38.94
Representing Haiti
2015	Pan American Games	Toronto, Canada	13th (sf)	100 m	10.32
2015	NACAC Championships	San José, Costa Rica	18th (h)	100 m	10.39
2016	World Indoor Championships	Portland, United States	32nd (h)	60 m	6.77
2016	Olympic Games	Rio de Janeiro, Brazil	54th (h)	100 m	10.39

== Personal bests ==
Outdoor

- 100 metres – 10.14 (+0.9 m/s, Raleigh 2013)
- 200 metres – 20.70 (-0.4 m/s, Raleigh 2013)

Indoor

- 60 metres – 6.57 (Fayetteville 2013)
