= Philip Osei =

Canadian sprinter (born 1990)

Personal information
- Born: 30 October 1990 (age 35) Toronto, Ontario, Canada

Sport
- Sport: Athletics
- Event: 400 m

Philip Osei (born 30 October 1990) is a Canadian sprinter specialising in the 400 metres. He represented his country at the 2016 World Indoor Championships

His personal bests in the event are 45.23 seconds outdoors (San José, CRC 2015) and 46.35 seconds indoors (New York 2016).

== Competition record ==
Year	Competition	Venue	Position	Event	Notes
Representing Canada
2011	Pan American Games	Guadalajara, Mexico	5th	4 × 400 m relay	3:07.12
2012	NACAC U23 Championships	Irapuato, Mexico	2nd	400 m	45.51
2012	NACAC U23 Championships	Irapuato, Mexico	4th	4 × 100 m relay	39.82
2013	Jeux de la Francophonie	Nice, France	4th	400 m	46.89
2014	IAAF World Relays	Nassau, Bahamas	6th (B)	4 × 400 m relay	3:04.67
2014	Commonwealth Games	Glasgow, United Kingdom	19th (sf)	400 m	47.16
2015	IAAF World Relays	Nassau, Bahamas	21st (h)	4 × 400 m relay	3:07.80
2015	Pan American Games	Toronto, Ontario, Canada	11th (h)	400 m	46.80
2015	Pan American Games	Toronto, Ontario, Canada	9th (h)	4 × 400 m relay	3:05.40
2015	NACAC Championships	San José, Costa Rica	6th	400 m	46.02
2016	World Indoor Championships	Portland, United States	14th (h)	400 m	47.00
2018	NACAC Championships	Toronto, Canada	4th	4 × 400 m relay	3:04.74
2019	Pan American Games	Lima, Peru	–	400 m	DNF
2019	World Championships	Doha, Qatar	19th (sf)	400 m	45.44
