= Jeffery Gibson =

Bahamian hurdler

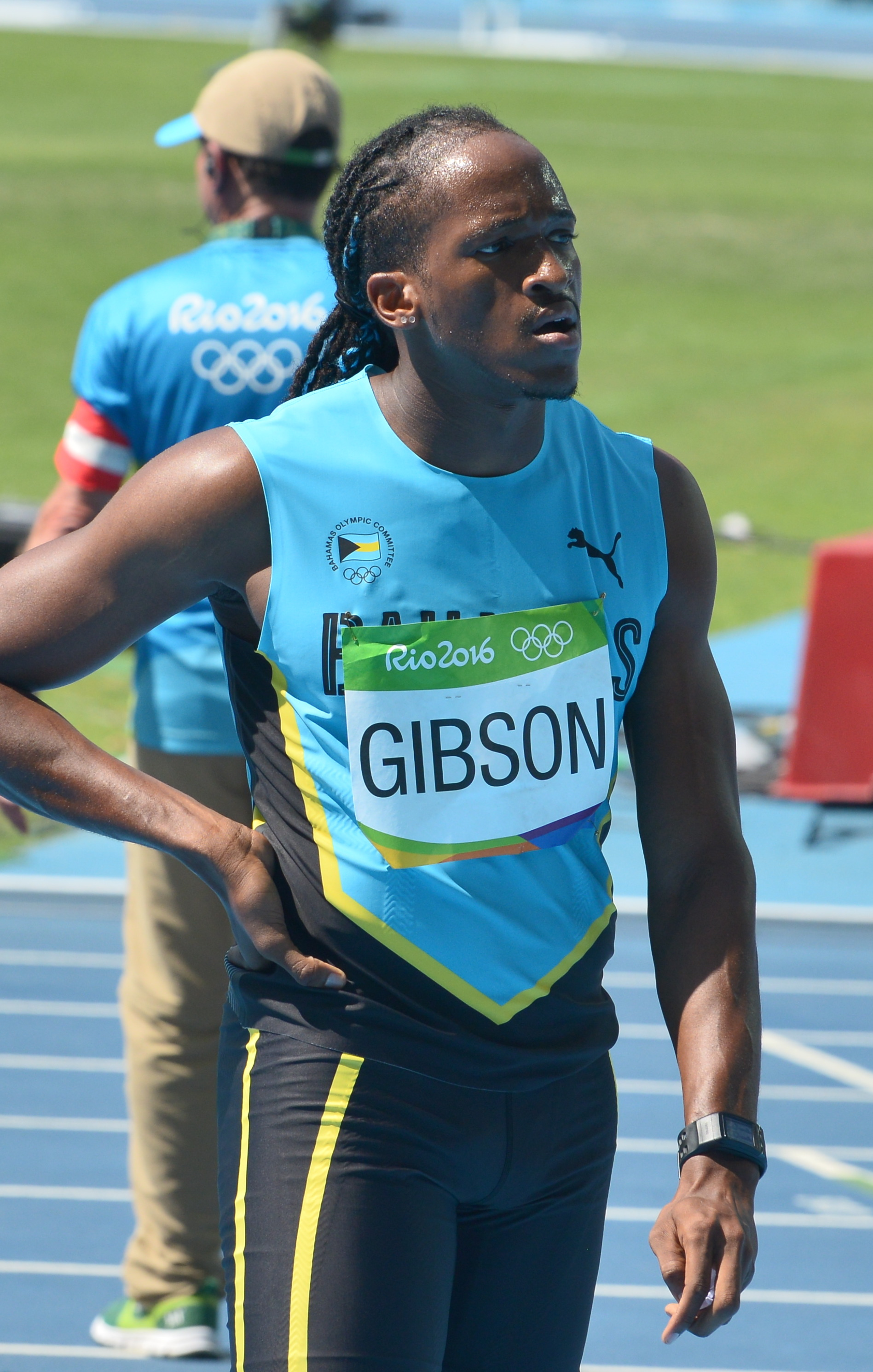
- Gibson at the 2016 Olympics

Personal information
- Nationality: Bahamian
- Born: August 15, 1990 (age 35) Freeport, Bahamas
- Education: Oral Roberts University
- Height: 6 ft 4 in (193 cm)

Sport
- Sport: Athletics
- Event: 400 m hurdles
Medal record
Representing the Bahamas
World Championships
Bronze medal – third place	2015 Beijing	400 m hurdles
Commonwealth Games
Silver medal – second place	2018 Gold Coast	400m Hurdles
Bronze medal – third place	2014 Glasgow	400m Hurdles
Pan American Games
Gold medal – first place	2015 Toronto	400 m hurdles
CAC Championships
Silver medal – second place	2013 Morelia	400 m hurdles
Silver medal – second place	2013 Morelia	4×400 m relay
NACAC U-23 Championships
Gold medal – first place	2012 Irapuato	400 m hurdles
Silver medal – second place	2012 Irapuato	4x400 m relay
Bronze medal – third place	2012 Irapuato	400 m
CARIFTA Games (Junior)
Bronze medal – third place	2008 Basseterre	4x400 m relay
CARIFTA Games (Youth)
Silver medal – second place	2006 Les Abymes	4x400 m relay

Jeffery Gibson (born 15 August 1990) is a Bahamian sprint athlete from Grand Bahama who mainly competes in the 400 metres and 400 metres hurdles. He is the Bahamian national record holder in the latter event with a 49.39 seconds clocking during the semi-finals of the 2013 NCAA Championships. He attended Bishop Michael Eldon School formerly Freeport Anglican High School. He later competed for Oral Roberts University following in the foot steps of compatriot Andretti Bain.

== Personal bests ==
Event	Time	Venue	Date
400 m	46.30	Irapuato, Mexico	7 July 2012
400 m hurdles	48.17	Beijing, China	25 August 2015

== Competition record ==
Year	Competition	Venue	Position	Event	Notes
Representing the Bahamas
2006	CARIFTA Games (U17)	Les Abymes, Guadeloupe	7th	400m	51.03
2006	CARIFTA Games (U17)	Les Abymes, Guadeloupe	3rd	4 × 400 m relay	3:19.80
2007	World Youth Championships	Ostrava, Czech Republic	14th (sf)	400m	48.86
2008	CARIFTA Games (U20)	Basseterre, Saint Kitts and Nevis	6th	400m	47.95
2008	CARIFTA Games (U20)	Basseterre, Saint Kitts and Nevis	3rd	4 × 400 m relay	3:12.09
2008	World Junior Championships	Bydgoszcz, Poland	36th (h)	400m hurdles	54.37
2008	World Junior Championships	Bydgoszcz, Poland	7th	4 × 400 m relay	3:21.75
2010	NACAC Under-23 Championships	Miramar, United States	7th	400m hurdles	52.43
2011	Central American and Caribbean Championships	Mayagüez, Puerto Rico	16th (h)	400m hurdles	54.28
2012	NACAC Under-23 Championships	Irapuato, Mexico	3rd	400 m	46.30
2012	NACAC Under-23 Championships	Irapuato, Mexico	1st	400m hurdles	50.27
2012	NACAC Under-23 Championships	Irapuato, Mexico	2nd	4 × 400 m relay	3:04.33
2013	Central American and Caribbean Championships	Morelia, Mexico	2nd	400m hurdles	49.94 A
2013	Central American and Caribbean Championships	Morelia, Mexico	2nd	4 × 400 m relay	3:02.66 A
2013	World Championships	Moscow, Russia	21st (sf)	400m hurdles	50.51
2014	Commonwealth Games	Glasgow, United Kingdom	3rd	400m hurdles	48.78
2014	Pan American Sports Festival	Mexico City, Mexico	1st	400m hurdles	48.91 A
2015	World Championships	Beijing, China	3rd	400 m hurdles	48.17 m
2016	Olympic Games	Rio de Janeiro, Brazil	46th (h)	400 m hurdles	52.77
2018	Commonwealth Games	Gold Coast, Australia	2nd	400 m hurdles	49.10
2019	Pan American Games	Lima, Peru	4th	400 m hurdles	49.53
2019	Pan American Games	Lima, Peru	7th	4 × 400 m relay	3:09.98
