= Mariel Espinosa =

Mexican athletics competitor

Personal information
- Full name: Mariel Espinosa Solís
- Born: January 24, 1987 (age 39) Morelia, Michoacán, Mexico
- Height: 1.70 m (5 ft 7 in)

Sport
- Sport: Athletics
- Event(s): Sprint, middle-distance
Medal record
Athletics
Representing Mexico
Central American and Caribbean Games
Silver medal – second place	2014 Veracruz	4 x 400 m relay
CAC Championships
Silver medal – second place	2013 Morelia	4 x 400 m relay
- Updated on 28 July 2015

Mariel Espinosa Solís (born 24 January 1987 in Morelia, Michoacán) is a female track and field athlete from Mexico who specializes in the 400 and 800 metres competitions.

Espinosa is one of the current Mexican athletics record-holders in the women's 4 × 800 metres relay since May 2014.
