= Sparkle McKnight =

Trinidadian athlete

Personal information
- Born: 21 December 1991 (age 34) Chaguanas, Trinidad and Tobago
- Education: University of Arkansas
- Height: 1.58 m (5 ft 2 in)
- Weight: 55 kg (121 lb)

Sport
- Country: Trinidad and Tobago
- Sport: Athletics
- Event: 400 metres hurdles
- College team: Arkansas Razorbacks

Sparkle Denise McKnight (born 21 December 1991) is a Trinidadian athlete specialising in the 400 metres hurdles. She represented her country at the 2013 and 2015 World Championships in Athletics reaching the semifinals on the second occasion. She was a reserve member of the Trinidadian 4 × 100 metres relay at the 2012 Summer Olympics but ultimately was not chosen to compete. However, she did compete in the 400 m hurdles at the 2016 and 2020 Olympics.

== International competitions ==
| Year | Competition | Venue | Position | Event | Notes |
Representing Trinidad and Tobago
| 2006 | CARIFTA Games (U17) | Les Abymes, Guadeloupe | 6th | 300 m hurdles | 45.76 |
| 2006 | Central American and Caribbean; Junior Championships (U20) | Port of Spain, Trinidad and Tobago | 3rd | 300 m hurdles | 43.36 |
| 2006 | Central American and Caribbean; Junior Championships (U20) | Port of Spain, Trinidad and Tobago | 2nd | 4 × 400 m relay | 3:47.28 |
| 2007 | CARIFTA Games (U17) | Providenciales, Turks and Caicos | 7th | 400 m | 56.80 |
| 2007 | CARIFTA Games (U17) | Providenciales, Turks and Caicos | 6th | 100 m hurdles (76.2 cm) | 14.88 |
| 2007 | CARIFTA Games (U17) | Providenciales, Turks and Caicos | 2nd | 300 m hurdles | 43.65 |
| 2008 | CARIFTA Games (U20) | Basseterre, Saint Kitts and Nevis | 5th | 400 m hurdles | 64.47 |
| 2008 | CARIFTA Games (U20) | Basseterre, Saint Kitts and Nevis | 2nd | 4 × 400 m relay | 3:43.65 |
| 2009 | CARIFTA Games (U20) | Vieux Fort, Saint Lucia | 9th (h) | 400 m | 56.82 |
| 2009 | CARIFTA Games (U20) | Vieux Fort, Saint Lucia | 4th | 4 × 400 m relay | 3:47.38 |
| 2009 | Pan American Junior Championships | Port of Spain, Trinidad and Tobago | 6th | 400 m | 55.05 |
| 2009 | Pan American Junior Championships | Port of Spain, Trinidad and Tobago | 8th | 400 m hurdles | 66.00 |
| 2010 | CARIFTA Games (U20) | George Town, Cayman Islands | 2nd | 400 m | 53.96 |
| 2010 | CARIFTA Games (U20) | George Town, Cayman Islands | 2nd | 4 × 400 m relay | 3:37.32 |
| 2010 | Central American and Caribbean; Junior Championships (U20) | Santo Domingo, Dom. Rep. | 5th | 400 m | 54.80 |
| 2010 | Central American and Caribbean; Junior Championships (U20) | Santo Domingo, Dom. Rep. | 2nd | 4 × 400 m relay | 3:38.49 |
| 2010 | World Junior Championships | Moncton, Canada | 25th (h) | 400 m | 55.01 |
| 2012 | NACAC U23 Championships | San José, Costa Rica | 4th | 400 m | 52.79 |
| 2012 | NACAC U23 Championships | San José, Costa Rica | 2nd | 4 × 400 m relay | 3:33.03 |
| 2013 | Central American and Caribbean Championships | Morelia, Mexico | 1st | 4 × 400 m relay | 3:30.64 |
| 2013 | World Championships | Moscow, Russia | 28th (h) | 400 m hurdles | 58.85 |
| 2013 | World Championships | Moscow, Russia | 13th (h) | 4 × 400 m relay | 3:33.50 |
| 2015 | Pan American Games | Toronto, Canada | 5th | 400 m hurdles | 57.30 |
| 2015 | Pan American Games | Toronto, Canada | 7th | 4 × 400 m relay | 3:33.31 |
| 2015 | NACAC Championships | San José, Costa Rica | 2nd | 400 m hurdles | 55.41 |
| 2015 | NACAC Championships | San José, Costa Rica | 5th | 4 × 400 m relay | 3:33.85 |
| 2015 | World Championships | Beijing, China | 17th (sf) | 400 m hurdles | 56.21 |
| 2016 | Olympic Games | Rio de Janeiro, Brazil | 30th (h) | 400 m hurdles | 56.80 |
| 2017 | World Championships | London, United Kingdom | 19th (sf) | 400 m hurdles | 56.59 |
| 2018 | Commonwealth Games | Gold Coast, Australia | 7th | 400 m hurdles | 57.45 |
| 2018 | Central American and Caribbean Games | Barranquilla, Colombia | 5th | 400 m hurdles | 55.56 |
| 2018 | NACAC Championships | Toronto, Canada | 6th | 400 m hurdles | 56.33 |
| 2019 | Pan American Games | Lima, Peru | 11th (h) | 400 m hurdles | 57.04 |

== Personal bests ==
Outdoor

- 200 metres – 23.29 (+1.9 m/s, Lubbock, Texas 2012)
- 400 metres – 52.17 (Tempe, Arizona 2013)
- 400 metres hurdles – 55.15 (Gold Coast, Australia 2018)

Indoor

- 400 metres – 52.52 (Fayetteville 2013) NR
