= Wesley Neymour =

Bahamian sprinter

Personal information
- Born: 1 September 1988 (age 37) Nassau, Bahamas
- Height: 1.93 m (6 ft 4 in)
- Weight: 82 kg (181 lb)

Sport
- Country: Bahamas
- Sport: Athletics
- Event: Sprint
Medal record
Men's Athletics
Representing Bahamas
CAC Championships
Silver medal – second place	2013 Morelia	4×400 m relay
NACAC Championships
Silver medal – second place	2015 Costa Rica	4x400m relay
- Updated on 15 December 2014

Wesley Neymour (born 1 September 1988) is a Bahamian sprinter. He was selected to be a part of the 2012 Summer Olympics as a reserve but did not compete.

== Personal bests ==
- 200 m: 21.43 s (wind: +1.4 m/s) – Nassau, Bahamas, 14 May 2011
- 400 m: 45.54 s – Freeport, Bahamas, 22 June 2013
- 800 m: 1:50.56 s – Coral Gables, United States, 16 April 2011

== Achievements ==
Year	Competition	Venue	Position	Event	Notes
Representing the Bahamas
2011	Central American and Caribbean Championships	Mayagüez, Puerto Rico	10th (h)	800m	1:54.07
2011	Pan American Games	Guadalajara, Mexico	6th (h)^{1}	4 × 100 m relay	40.05
2011	Pan American Games	Guadalajara, Mexico	6th (h)^{1}	4 × 400 m relay	3:09.68
2013	Central American and Caribbean Championships	Morelia, Mexico	4th (h)^{1}	400m	46.66
2013	Central American and Caribbean Championships	Morelia, Mexico	2nd	4 × 400 m relay	3:02.66 A
2013	World Championships	Moscow, Russia	13th (h)	4 × 400 m relay	3:02.67
2014	World Relays	Nassau, Bahamas	6th	4 × 200 m relay	1:23.19
2014	Central American and Caribbean Games	Xalapa, Mexico	5th (h)	400m	47.25 A
2015	NACAC Championships	San José, Costa Rica	2nd	4 × 400 m relay	3:00.53

^{1}: Did not show in the final.
^{2}: Disqualified in the final.
