= Alfred Higgs (sprinter) =

Bahamian sprinter

Personal information
- Born: December 31, 1991 (age 34) Freeport, Bahamas
Medal record
Athletics
Representing Bahamas
NACAC U-23 Championships
Silver medal – second place	2012 Irapuato	4x100 m relay
Silver medal – second place	2012 Irapuato	4x400 m relay

Alfred Higgs (born 31 December 1991) is a Bahamian sprinter from Freeport, Bahamas who competed in the 100m and 200. He attended Tabernacle Baptist High School in Freeport, Bahamas, before going on to compete for Iowa Central Community College and the University of South Florida. Higgs competed at the 2010 World Junior Championships in Athletics in Moncton, Canada and the 2015 IAAF World Relays in Nassau, Bahamas.

== Personal bests ==
Event	Time	Venue	Date
100 m	10.34	Council Bluffs, Iowa	26 APR 2012
200 m	21.21	Council Bluffs, Iowa	26 APR 2012
400m	48.73	Tampa, Florida	13 MAR 2015
