= Brittany Smith (shot putter) =

American shot put thrower

Personal information
- Nationality: American
- Born: 25 March 1991 (age 35)
- Home town: Oak Park, Illinois

Sport
- Sport: Athletics
- Event(s): Shot put, hammer throw
- College team: Illinois State Redbirds
- Club: Desert High Performance

Achievements and titles
- Personal bests: SP: 19.01 m i (2015); HT: 70.27 m (2014)
Medal record
Women's athletics
Representing United States
NACAC U23 Championships
Gold medal – first place	2012 Irapuato	Shot put
Silver medal – second place	2012 Irapuato	Hammer throw

Brittany Smith (born 25 March 1991) is an American shot put and hammer thrower. She was the 2023 NACAC U23 champion in the shot put.

== Biography ==
Smith grew up in Oak Park, Illinois, where she attended Oak Park River Forest High School. Her best high school state finish was fifth in the discus throw with a mark of 143 feet 2.6 inches.

In college, Smith competed for the Illinois State Redbirds track and field team from 2009 to 2013. She earned two runner-up performances at the 2012 NCAA Division I Outdoor Track and Field Championships in the shot put and hammer throw. During her junior year, she won two medals at the 2012 NACAC U23 Championships in Athletics, winning the shot put and taking the silver medal in the hammer throw.

Following graduation, Smith was the Director of Operations for track and cross country programs at Illinois State University. In 2015, Smith briefly was the world leader in the women's shot put, after she set her personal best mark of 19.01 metres at an indoor track meet on 17 January.

== Statistics ==
=== Personal bests ===
Event	Mark	Competition	Venue	Date
Shot put	19.01 m i	Titan Triangular	Bloomington, Illinois	17 January 2015
Hammer throw	70.27 m	Redbird Invite	Normal, Illinois	3 May 2014
