= Sarah Sellers =

American long-distance runner

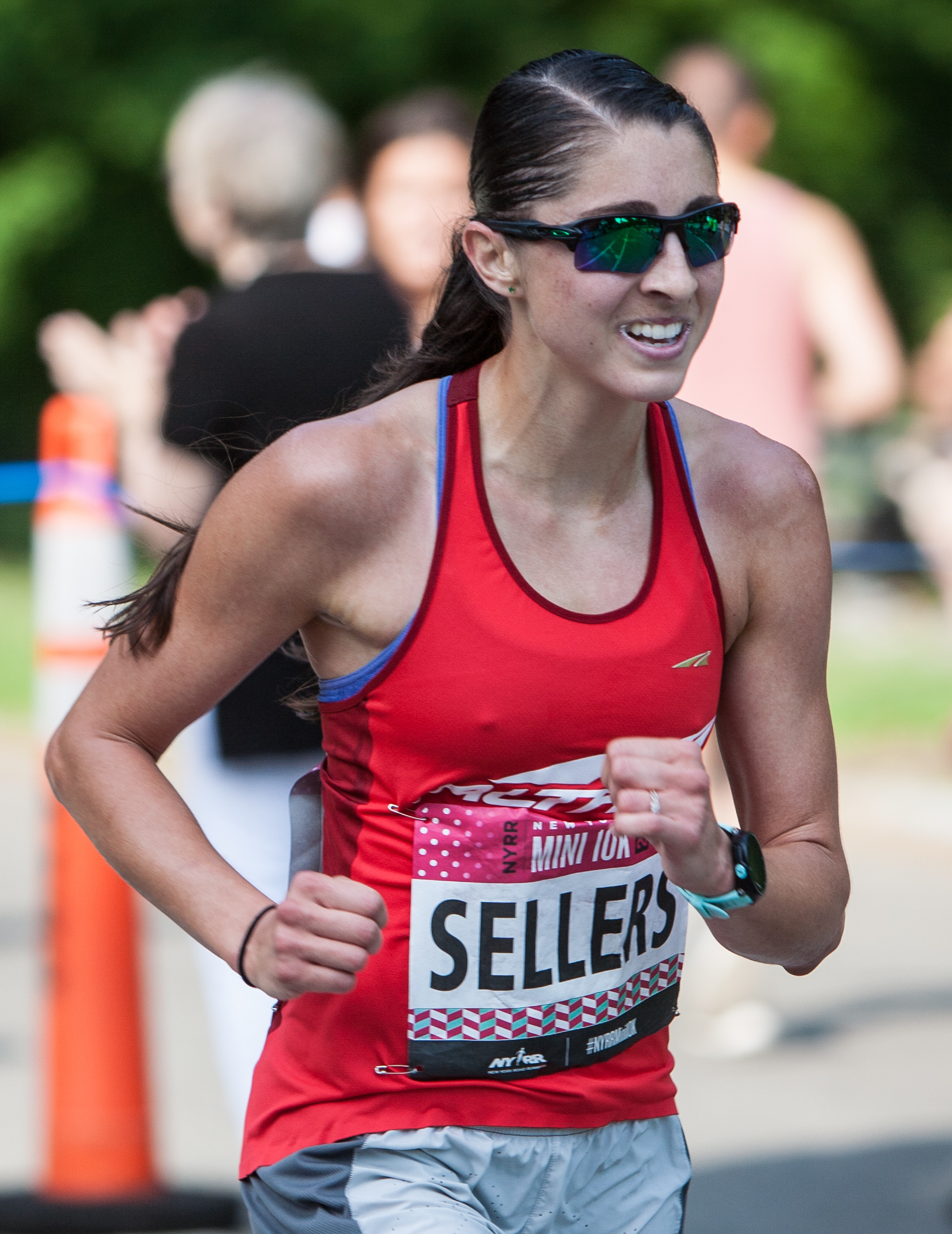
- Sellers at the 2018 New York Mini 10K

Personal information
- Born: Sarah Callister; July 10, 1991 (age 34)

Sport
- Country: United States
- Sport: Track and field
- Event(s): 10,000 metres, Marathon
- College team: Weber State University
- Coached by: Paul Pilkington

Achievements and titles
- Personal bests: 5000 meters: 16:00.95; 10,000 meters: 32:51.17; Half Marathon: 1:11:40; Marathon: 2:25:43
Medal record
Representing United States
Women's Athletics
World Marathon Majors
Silver medal – second place	2018 Boston	Marathon
NACAC U23 Championships in Athletics
Gold medal – first place	2012 Irapuato	10,000 m

Sarah Sellers (née Callister, born July 10, 1991) is an American long-distance runner.

== Running career ==
=== College career ===
Sellers ran at Weber State University from 2009 to 2012 where she was a nine-time Big Sky Conference champion, before a stress fracture of her left navicular bone forced her to cut her college career short. Her primary collegiate events were the 5K and 10K, while also competing in cross-country.

=== International career ===
In her marathon debut, she won the Huntsville Marathon in Utah to qualify for the 2018 Boston Marathon. At the 2018 Boston Marathon, she finished second to earn $75,000.

Her coach is Paul Pilkington (a marathon runner who won the LA marathon even though he was a pacer). The NYRR announced on May 8, 2018 that Sarah Sellers will be running in the NYRR Mini 10k race in Central Park at 8am on June 9, 2018.

Sellers placed 18th in a personal best time at 2018 New York City Marathon.

Sellers placed 19th in 2019 Boston Marathon.

Sellers placed second in 2022 Grandma's Marathon in 2:25:43 behind winner Dakotah Lindwurm.

Medal	Race	Place	Time
Gold medal	2017 Huntsville Marathon	1st	2:44:27
Silver medal	2018 Boston Marathon	2nd	2:44:04
Representing Altra Running
	2018 New York City Marathon	18th	2:36:37
	2019 Boston Marathon	19th	2:36:42
	2019 Chicago Marathon	12th	2:31:49
	2020 U.S. Olympic Trials (marathon)	11th	2:31:48
Silver medal	2022 Grandma's Marathon	2nd	2:25:43
	2024 U.S. Olympic Trials (marathon)	14th	2:30:17

== Personal life ==
Sellers' full-time job is as a certified registered nurse anesthetist (CRNA), working for Southern Arizona Anesthesia Services in Tucson, Arizona. Her husband is a resident orthopedic surgeon. They lived in Tucson, Arizona until moved to Ogden, Utah. Blake, and Sarah have two daughters - Emery (2021) and Brynn (2023 – 9 months before 2024 United States Olympic trials (marathon)). Sister-in-law, Natalie Callister, raced the 2024 United States Olympic trials (marathon) and finished 109th in the Trials.
