= Keenan Brock =

American sprinter

Personal information
- Nationality: American
- Born: January 6, 1992 (age 34) Birmingham, Alabama
- Height: 5 ft 10 in (1.78 m)
- Weight: 170

Sport
- Sport: Running
- Events: 100 metres, 200 metres
- College team: Auburn Tigers

Achievements and titles
- Personal bests: 100 m: 10.09 (Auburn 2012) SEC Champion 2012 at LSU ran 10.18 winning the men's 100 meters 200 m: 20.47 (Auburn 2012)
Medal record
Men's athletics
Representing the United States
Pan American Junior Championships
Gold medal – first place	2011 Miramar	4 × 100 m relay
Silver medal – second place	2011 Miramar	100 m
World Youth Championships
Gold medal – first place	2009 Brixen	Medley relay
Bronze medal – third place	2009 Brixen	200 m

Keenan Brock (born January 6, 1992) is an American sprinter who specializes in the 100 and 200 metres.

Brock ran for George Washington Carver High School in Birmingham, Alabama, where he won the Alabama State Championships twice at 100 and 200 and once in the triple jump. His time in the 100 his senior year was the state record 10.37. Between his junior and senior years, he won an individual bronze medal in the 200 metres and was on the winning American team in the Medley Relay at the 2009 World Youth Championships in Athletics in Brixen.

Next he went to the University of Auburn. He ran for the USA at the 2011 Pan American Junior Athletics Championships taking an individual silver medal in the 100 metres and being part of the American gold medal winning 4 × 100 metres relay. The following year he again was on the American squad at the 2012 NACAC Under-23 Championships in Athletics, taking the same combination of 100 metres silver and anchoring the 4 × 100. His 10.09 personal record that year got him into the 2012 United States Olympic Trials.
