= Allison Randall =

Jamaican discus thrower

Personal information
- Born: 25 February 1988 (age 38) Baltimore, Maryland, United States
- Education: Morgan State University (2011); Pittsburg State University (2013); Virginia Polytechnic Institute & State University (2018)
- Height: 1.80 m (5 ft 11 in)
- Weight: 86 kg (190 lb)

Sport
- Country: Jamaica
- Sport: Athletics
- Event: Discus

Achievements and titles
- Personal best: 61.21m
Medal record
Central American and Caribbean Championships
Gold medal – first place	2013 Morelia	Discus throw
Bronze medal – third place	2011 Mayaguez	Discus throw
- Updated on 5 January 2022

Allison Randall (born 25 February 1988) is an American-born Jamaican athlete. She competed for Jamaica in the discus throw at the 2012 Summer Olympics the year after winning a gold medal at the Central American and Caribbean Championships.

In 2012, Randall held the Jamaican discus record for a throw of 61.21 meters.

Randall competed multiple times in the discus throw for Jamaica on the international stage, including the 2013 Central American and Caribbean Games (gold medalist), 2012 London Olympics, 2011 Pan American Games and the 2011 Central American and Caribbean Games (bronze medalist). She also represented Morgan State at the 2010 NCAA Outdoor Track and Field Championships.
