= Ivanique Kemp =

Bahamian athlete and hurdler

Personal information
- Born: June 11, 1991 (age 35) Nassau, New Providence, Bahamas
Medal record
Athletics
Representing Bahamas
NACAC U-23 Championships
Silver medal – second place	2012 Irapuato	4x100 m relay
CAC Junior Championships (Junior)
Silver medal – second place	2010 Santo Domingo	100m Hurdles
Silver medal – second place	2010 Santo Domingo	4×100 m relay
CARIFTA Games Junior (U20)
Silver medal – second place	2009 Vieux Fort	100 m Hurdles
Silver medal – second place	2009 Vieux Fort	4x100 m relay
Bronze medal – third place	2010 George Town	100 m Hurdles

Ivanique Kemp (born June 11, 1991) in Nassau, Bahamas) is a Bahamian female athlete. She participated in the 2012 Summer Olympics at London for the women's 100m hurdles event. She got through to the semi-finals with a time of 13.51 seconds in heat 2. In the semis, she recorded a poorer time of 13.56 seconds and came last in the second semi final.

== Personal bests ==
Event	Time	Venue	Date
100 m	11.80 (0.0)	Tempe, Arizona	06 APR 2013
200 m	24.44 (0.0)	Tempe Arizona	06 APR 2013
100m Hurdles	13.13 (+1.1)	Des Moines, Iowa	07 JUN 2012
