= Annie LeBlanc (athlete) =

Canadian middle-distance runner

Personal information
- Born: 29 April 1992 (age 34) Repentigny, Quebec, Canada

Sport
- Sport: Middle-distance running
- Event: 800 metres

Annie LeBlanc (born 29 April 1992) is a Canadian middle-distance runner. She competed in the women's 800 metres at the 2017 World Championships in Athletics.

LeBlanc competed for the Oregon Ducks track and field team in the NCAA.
