= 2013 Central American and Caribbean Championships in Athletics =

24th Central American and Caribbean Championships
- Dates: July 5–7
- Host city: Morelia, Michoacán, Mexico
- Venue: Pista de Atletismo "Ernesto Canto" del Complejo Olímpico Bicentenario
- Level: Senior
- Events: 44 (22 men, 22 women)
- Participation: about 338 athletes from 28 nations
- Records set: 2

The 24th Central American and Caribbean Championships in Athletics were held at the Pista de Atletismo "Ernesto Canto" del Complejo Olímpico Bicentenario in Morelia, Michoacán, Mexico, between July 5–7, 2013.

A total of 44 events were contested, 22 by men and 22 by women.

A detailed analysis of the championships was published by Javier Clavelo Robinson.

== Records ==
Two new Central American and Caribbean Championships records and a couple of other (mainly national) records were set.

Name	Event	Country	Record	Type
O'Dayne Richards	Shot put	Jamaica	20.97m	CR
Levern Spencer	High jump	Saint Lucia	1.95m	CR

Key:	WR — World record • AR — Area record • CR — Championship record • NR — National record

== Medal summary ==
The results were published.

=== Men ===
Event	Gold		Silver		Bronze	
100 metres (wind: +0.5 m/s)	Andrew Fisher (JAM)	10.14	Andrew Hinds (BAR)	10.19	Ramon Gittens (BAR)	10.19
200 metres (wind: +0.5 m/s)	Antoine Adams (SKN)	20.13 NR	Lalonde Gordon (TRI)	20.28	Jason Livermore (JAM)	20.29
400 metres	Jarrin Solomon (TRI)	45.54	Omar Johnson (JAM)	45.67	Gustavo Cuesta (DOM)	46.20
800 metres	Andy González (CUB)	1:49.54	Ricardo Cunningham (JAM)	1:49.97	Jowayne Hibbert (JAM)	1:50.10
1500 metres	Christopher Sandoval (MEX)	3:52.94	Fabián Guerrero (MEX)	3:53.53	José Alberto Beras (DOM)	4:02.61
5000 metres	Juan Luis Barrios (MEX)	14:08.19	Fabián Guerrero (MEX)	14:48.94	Alfredo Arévalo (GUA)	15:22.23
10,000 metres	Juan Carlos Romero (MEX)	30:11.84	Sergio Pedraza (MEX)	30:16.76	Alfredo Arévalo (GUA)	32:23.55
3000 metres steeplechase	Javier Quintana (MEX)	9:17.56	Luis Enrique Ibarra (MEX)	9:27.92	Álvaro Abreu (DOM)	9:42.51
110 metres hurdles (wind: -3.4 m/s)	Shane Brathwaite (BAR)	13.70	Wayne Davis (TRI)	13.75	Yordan O'Farrill (CUB)	13.82
400 metres hurdles	Emmanuel Mayers (TRI)	49.72	Jeffery Gibson (BAH)	49.94	Amaury Valle (CUB)	50.02
High jump	Darrell Garwood (JAM)	2.22m	Jamal Wilson (BAH)	2.22m	Arturo Abascal (MEX)	2.10m
Pole vault	Raúl Ríos (MEX)	5.10m	Víctor Castillero (MEX)	4.80m	Jorge Montes (DOM)	4.65m
Long jump	Alberto Álvarez (MEX)	7.85m (wind: +1.1 m/s)	Eddy Florian (DOM)	7.80m (wind: +0.8 m/s)	Kiron Blaise (TRI)	7.73m (wind: +1.5 m/s)
Triple jump	Yordanis Durañona (DMA)	16.45m (wind: -1.2 m/s)	Alberto Álvarez (MEX)	16.39m (wind: +0.6 m/s)	Christopher Hercules (TRI)	16.00 (wind: -0.5 m/s)
Shot put	O'Dayne Richards (JAM)	20.97m CR	Josué Santana (MEX)	17.74m	Mario Cota (MEX)	17.67m
Discus throw	Chad Wright (JAM)	60.79m	Mario Cota (MEX)	58.58m	Quincy Wilson (TRI)	55.83m
Hammer throw	Roberto Sawyers (CRC)	68.92m	Diego del Real (MEX)	65.35m	Diego Berrios (GUA)	61.88m
Javelin throw	Carlos Armenta (MEX)	72.49m	Alexander Pascal (CAY)	71.85m	José Lagunes (MEX)	69.64m
Decathlon	Rodrigo Sagaón (MEX)	7011 pts	Jorge Eduardo Rivera (MEX)	6773 pts	Josué Louis (HAI)	6619 pts
20 Kilometres Road Walk	Jorge Alejandro Martínez (MEX)	1:27:17	Julio César Salazar (MEX)	1:29:51	Allan Segura (CRC)	1:39:14
4 × 100 metres relay	Bahamas; Adrian Griffith; Jamial Rolle; Trevorvano Mackey; Shavez Hart	38.77 NR	Jamaica; Oshane Bailey; Andrew Fisher; Jermaine Brown; Jason Livermore	38.86	Trinidad and Tobago; Jamol James; Ayodele Taffe; Jereem Richards; Emmanuel Callender	39.26
4 × 400 metres relay	Trinidad and Tobago; Renny Quow; Emmanuel Mayers; Machel Cedenio; Jarrin Solomon	3:02.19	Bahamas; Latoy Williams; O'Jay Ferguson; Jeffery Gibson; Wesley Neymour	3:02.66	Dominican Republic; Arismendy Peguero; Gustavo Cuesta; Félix Sánchez; Luguelín Santos	3:02.82

=== Women ===
Event	Gold		Silver		Bronze	
100 metres (wind: +0.1 m/s)	Sheri-Ann Brooks (JAM)	11.21	Marielys Sánchez (DOM)	11.24	Aleen Bailey (JAM)	11.34
200 metres (wind: -0.6 m/s)	Kineke Alexander (VIN)	23.00	Aleen Bailey (JAM)	23.08	Marielys Sánchez (DOM)	23.15
400 metres	Kadecia Baird (GUY)	51.32	Chrisann Gordon (JAM)	52.52	Kineke Alexander (VIN)	52.81
800 metres	Natoya Goude (JAM)	2:02.02	Semoya Campbell (JAM)	2:03.08	Rose Mary Almanza (CUB)	2:03.10
1500 metres	Brenda Flores (MEX)	4:27.55	Adriana Muñoz (CUB)	4:31.79	Alejandra Silis (MEX)	4:32.06
5000 metres	Marisol Romero (MEX)	16:04.93	Brenda Flores (MEX)	17:11.89	Elida Hernández (GUA)	18:17.55
10,000 metres ^{†}	Kathia García (MEX)	35:19.92	Daniela Alonso (MEX)	36:05.94	Elida Hernández (GUA)	37:44.35
3000 metres steeplechase	Azucena Ríos (MEX)	10:56.55	María Mancebo (DOM)	11:09.21	Elisa Hernández (MEX)	11:20.28
100 metres hurdles (wind: -1.5 m/s)	Monique Morgan (JAM)	13.25	Kierre Beckles (BAR)	13.37	LaVonne Idlette (DOM)	13.41
400 metres hurdles	Danielle Dowie (JAM)	56.39	Sharolyn Scott (CRC)	57.74	Zudikey Rodríguez (MEX)	58.12
High jump	Levern Spencer (LCA)	1.95m CR	Jeanelle Scheper (LCA)	1.92m NJR	Saniel Atkinson-Grier (JAM)	1.84m
Pole vault	Carmelita Correa (MEX)	3.95m	Tiziana Ruiz (MEX)	3.90m	Alexandra González (PUR)	3.85m
Long jump	Francine Simpson (JAM)	6.49m (wind: -0.2 m/s)	Arantxa King (BER)	6.45m (wind: -0.3 m/s)	Bianca Stuart (BAH)	6.42m (wind: -0.5 m/s)
Triple jump	Tamara Myers (BAH)	13.18m (wind: -0.6 m/s)	Ayanna Alexander (TRI)	13.17m (wind: -1.6 m/s)	Liliana Hernández (MEX)	12.90m (wind: -1.4 m/s)
Shot put	Cleopatra Borel (TRI)	17.56m	Cecilia Dzul (MEX)	16.33m	Laura Pulido (MEX)	15.69m
Discus throw	Allison Randall (JAM)	55.26m	Paulina Flores (MEX)	50.16m	Irais Estrada (MEX)	49.84m
Hammer throw	Samantha Hernández (MEX)	54.27m	Yolanda González (MEX)	54.26m		
Javelin throw	Coralis Ortiz (PUR)	57.48m	Betzabet Menéndez (MEX)	48.90m	Diana Martínez (MEX)	47.40m
Heptathlon	Chrystal Ruiz (MEX)	5467 pts	Shianne Smith (BER)	5222 pts	Milagros Montes de Oca (DOM)	5204 pts
10,000 metres Walk	María Guadalupe González (MEX)	47:48.30	Milangela Rosales (VEN)	49:27.10	Zayra Jáuregui (MEX)	50:00.90
4 × 100 metres relay	Jamaica; Elaine Thompson; Nadine Palmer; Aleen Bailey; Sheri-Ann Brooks	43.58	Trinidad and Tobago; Kamaria Durant; Kai Selvon; Reyare Thomas; Michelle-Lee Ahye	43.67	Bahamas; Tyla Carter; Cache Armbrister; Debbie Ferguson-McKenzie; Nivea Smith	44.08
4 × 400 metres relay	Trinidad and Tobago; Shawna Fermin; Sparkle McKnight; Ramona Modeste; Alena Brooks	3:30.64 NR	Mexico; Mariel Espinosa; Zudikey Rodríguez; Claudia Soberanes; Gabriela Medina	3:34.52	Bahamas; Shakeithra Henfield; Lanece Clarke; Miriam Byfield; Amara Jones	3:36.41

^{†}: In women's 10000 m, some athletes were invited to start out of competition. Martha Iris Vázquez from Mexico came in second in 35:49.23 min, and Violeta Gómez, also from Mexico, came in 4th in 37:14.57 min.

== Medal table ==
* Host nation (Mexico)

The unofficial medal count is in accordance with the published medal table.
Rank	Nation	Gold	Silver	Bronze	Total
1	Mexico*	17	19	11	47
2	Jamaica	11	6	4	21
3	Trinidad and Tobago	5	4	4	13
4	Bahamas	2	3	3	8
5	Barbados	1	2	1	4
6	Cuba	1	1	3	5
7	Costa Rica	1	1	1	3
8	Saint Lucia	1	1	0	2
9	Puerto Rico	1	0	1	2
9	Saint Vincent and the Grenadines	1	0	1	2
11	Dominica	1	0	0	1
11	Guyana	1	0	0	1
11	Saint Kitts and Nevis	1	0	0	1
14	Dominican Republic	0	3	8	11
15	Bermuda	0	2	0	2
16	Cayman Islands	0	1	0	1
16	Venezuela	0	1	0	1
18	Guatemala	0	0	5	5
19	Haiti	0	0	1	1
Totals (19 entries)		44	44	43	131

== Participation ==
The published competition results report the participation of about 338 athletes from 28 countries. Colombia, Panama and Suriname sent their athletes to the South American Championships held in Cartagena de Indias, Colombia at the same weekend. Aruba, Belize and Nicaragua did not participate.

- Anguilla (3)
- Antigua and Barbuda (3)
- Bahamas (25)
- Barbados (12)
- Bermuda (7)
- British Virgin Islands (6)
- Cayman Islands (5)
- Costa Rica (10)
- Cuba (9)
- Dominica (6)
- Dominican Republic (21)
- Grenada (4)
- Guatemala (14)
- Guyana (3)
- Haiti (7)
- Honduras (3)
- Jamaica (39)
- Mexico (82)
- Montserrat (2)
- Puerto Rico (22)
- Saint Kitts and Nevis (8)
- Saint Lucia (3)
- Saint Vincent and the Grenadines (3)
- El Salvador (6)
- Trinidad and Tobago (32)
- Turks and Caicos Islands (1)
- U.S. Virgin Islands (1)
- Venezuela (1)
