= Mélanie Blouin =

Canadian pole vaulter (born 1990)

Personal information
- Born: July 14, 1990 (age 36) Alma, Quebec, Canada
- Height: 1.75 m (5 ft 9 in)
- Weight: 64 kg (141 lb)

Sport
- Country: Canada
- Sport: Athletics
- Event: Pole Vault
- Coached by: Arye Rosenoer

Achievements and titles
- Personal bests: 4.50 m (outdoor), 4.35 m (indoor)
- Updated on December 9, 2022

Mélanie Blouin (born July 14, 1990) is a Canadian track and field athlete competing in the pole vault. Born in Alma, Quebec, she competed in the pole vault event at the 2012 Summer Olympics, where she finished in 19th place. Blouin also competed in the pole vault event at the 2015 Pan American Games, where she tied for 7th place.

== Achievements ==
- 2012: National Championships, Calgary, Canada (Olympic "A" Standard) – first place
- 2012 NACAC Champion and record holder (4.35m)
- Quebec Provincial record holder - senior women's pole vault (indoor) 4.35m, (outdoor) 4.40m
- Personal best: 4.50 meters Bolton, Ontario, Canada, 2015
