= Amara Jones =

Bahamian sprinter

Personal information
- Born: September 18, 1991 (age 34)
Medal record
Athletics
Representing Bahamas
CAC Championships
Bronze medal – third place	2013 Morelia	4×400 m relay
NACAC U-23 Championships
Silver medal – second place	2012 Irapuato	4x100 m relay

Amara Jones (born September 18, 1991) is a Bahamian sprinter from Freeport, Bahamas who competed in the 200m and 400. She attended Sunland Baptist Academy in Freeport, Bahamas, before competing for the Savannah State University. She was selected to the 2012 Olympic Games team for the Bahamas but did not compete. Jones also competed at 2013 World Championships in Athletics in Moscow, Russia.

== Personal bests ==
Event	Time	Venue	Date
200 m	23.28 (+1.0)	Greensboro, North Carolina	05 MAY 2012
400 m	52.43	Greensboro, North Carolina	05 MAY 2012
4x 400 Metres Relay	3:32.90	Philadelphia, Pennsylvania	27 APR 2013
