= Tremaine Harris =

Canadian track and field athlete

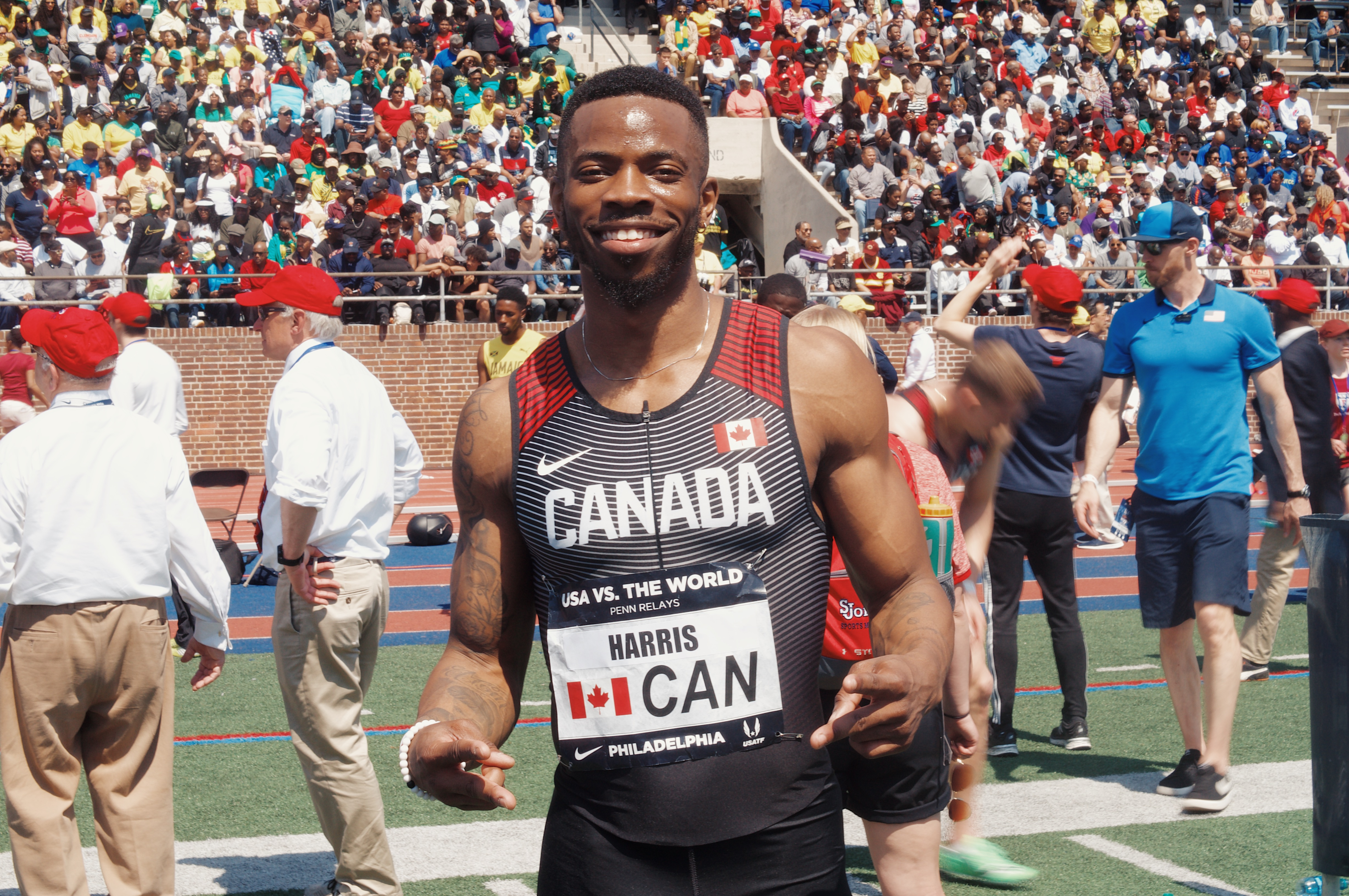
- Harris at the 2018 Penn Relays

Personal information
- Full name: Tremaine Ryan Alexander Harris
- Nickname: Tre
- Nationality: Canada
- Born: February 10, 1992 (age 34) Toronto, Ontario, Canada
- Height: 1.81 m (5 ft 11 in)
- Weight: 81 kg (179 lb; 12.8 st)

Sport
- Sport: Running
- Club: Project Athletics Track and Field Club

Achievements and titles
- Personal best: 200m: 20.22s (Irapuato 2012) 400m: 46.22s (Victoria 2011)
Medal record
Men's Athletics
Representing Canada
NACAC U-23 Championships
Gold medal – first place	2012 Irapuato	200 m
Pan American Junior Championships
Silver medal – second place	2011 Guadalajara	4×400 m relay

Tremaine Harris (born February 10, 1992) is a Canadian track and field athlete who specializes in the sprint distances. He is of Jamaican descent and is fluent in English and French. His personal best for the 200 m (20.22 seconds) is the sixth fastest in Canadian history. He is coached by Anthony McCleary and Desai Williams.

== Early life ==
Born in Toronto, Ontario, Harris attended several schools growing up across the Greater Toronto Area, such as Father Henry Carr Secondary School, Markham District High School, and Bur Oak Secondary School, to pursue his track career.

== Career ==
Harris competed in his first international competition at the 2010 World Junior Championships in Athletics in the 400 m sprint. He competed in the 2011 Canadian Junior Track and Field Championships in the 200 m and 400 m events winning gold in both. Though he was still a junior, he competed in the 2011 Canadian Track and Field Championships winning gold in the 400 m with a time of 46.24 seconds, becoming the first Canadian to win gold in the same event in both the junior and senior championships in the same year. Less than a month later, Harris received his first international medal at the 2011 Pan American Junior Athletics Championships in the 4 × 100 m relay winning the silver medal. Harris competed in the 200 m event at the 2012 Summer Olympics, finishing 5th in his heat. At the 2013 World Championships in Moscow, Harris again ran in the 200 m event, finishing 5th in his heat with a time of 20.68 s.

== Achievements ==
- 1st, men's 200 m, 2012 National Championships, Calgary, Canada .
- 13th, 200 m 2010 IAAF World Junior Championships
- Personal Best: 20.22, Guadalajara 8 July 2012
