= 2004 NACAC Under-23 Championships in Athletics – Results =

These are the full results of the 2004 NACAC Under-23 Championships in Athletics which took place between July 30 and August 1, 2004, at Université de Sherbrooke Stadium in Sherbrooke, Québec, Canada.

== Men's results ==
=== 100 meters ===
Heats
Wind: Heat 1: 0.0 m/s, Heat 2: -0.4 m/s, Heat 3: 0.0 m/s

| Rank | Heat | Name | Nationality | Time | Notes |
|---|---|---|---|---|---|
| 1 | 1 | Churandy Martina | Netherlands Antilles | 10.30 | Q |
| 2 | 3 | Sean Lambert | Grenada | 10.39 | Q |
| 3 | 1 | Wes Felix | United States | 10.45 | Q |
| 4 | 2 | Ernest Wiggins | United States | 10.47 | Q |
| 5 | 1 | Adrian Durant | U.S. Virgin Islands | 10.53 | q |
| 6 | 1 | Andrew Hinds | Barbados | 10.55 | q |
| 7 | 3 | Emanuel Parris | Canada | 10.56 | Q |
| 8 | 3 | Xavier Brown | Jamaica | 10.64 | |
| 9 | 2 | Derrick Atkins | Bahamas | 10.65 | Q |
| 10 | 3 | Delwayne Delaney | Saint Kitts and Nevis | 10.69 | |
| 11 | 2 | Julio Calderón | Puerto Rico | 10.96 | |
| 12 | 3 | Pierre de Windt | Aruba | 10.97 | |
| 13 | 2 | Jamal Simmons | Barbados | 11.04 | |
| 14 | 1 | Robert Ibeh | Cayman Islands | 11.08 | |
| 15 | 3 | Darian Forbes | Turks and Caicos Islands | 11.09 | |
| 15 | 3 | Stéphane Rabel | Haiti | 11.09 | |
| 17 | 1 | Jorge Luis Solórzano | Guatemala | 12.13 | |
| 18 | 1 | Marvin Anderson | Jamaica | 12.73 | |

Final
Wind: +0.1 m/s

| Rank | Name | Nationality | Time | Notes |
|---|---|---|---|---|
| 1st place, gold medalist(s) | Churandy Martina | Netherlands Antilles | 10.21 | |
| 2nd place, silver medalist(s) | Ernest Wiggins | United States | 10.33 | |
| 3rd place, bronze medalist(s) | Sean Lambert | Grenada | 10.40 | |
| 4 | Wes Felix | United States | 10.47 | |
| 5 | Derrick Atkins | Bahamas | 10.49 | |
| 6 | Emanuel Parris | Canada | 10.52 | |
| 7 | Andrew Hinds | Barbados | 10.52 | |
| | Adrian Durant | U.S. Virgin Islands | DQ | |

=== 200 meters ===
Heats
Wind: Heat 1: -0.5 m/s, Heat 2: +0.1 m/s, Heat 3: -1.4 m/s

| Rank | Heat | Name | Nationality | Time | Notes |
|---|---|---|---|---|---|
| 1 | 1 | Brendan Christian | Antigua and Barbuda | 20.67 | Q |
| 2 | 2 | Wallace Spearmon | United States | 20.71 | Q |
| 3 | 2 | Churandy Martina | Netherlands Antilles | 20.90 | Q |
| 4 | 3 | Kyle Farmer | United States | 21.01 | Q |
| 5 | 1 | Oral Thompson | Jamaica | 21.13 | Q |
| 6 | 3 | Adrian Durant | U.S. Virgin Islands | 21.14 | Q |
| 7 | 1 | Jason Hunte | Barbados | 21.15 | q |
| 8 | 2 | Emanuel Parris | Canada | 21.38 | q |
| 9 | 3 | Delwayne Delaney | Saint Kitts and Nevis | 21.46 | |
| 10 | 2 | Andrew Hinds | Barbados | 21.52 | |
| 11 | 1 | Robert Ibeh | Cayman Islands | 21.92 | |
| 12 | 3 | Derrick Atkins | Bahamas | 21.95 | |
| 13 | 3 | Darian Forbes | Turks and Caicos Islands | 21.99 | |
| 14 | 2 | Esteban Santiago | Puerto Rico | 22.01 | |

Final
Wind: +0.0 m/s

| Rank | Name | Nationality | Time | Notes |
|---|---|---|---|---|
| 1st place, gold medalist(s) | Wallace Spearmon | United States | 20.59 | |
| 2nd place, silver medalist(s) | Churandy Martina | Netherlands Antilles | 20.75 | |
| 3rd place, bronze medalist(s) | Kyle Farmer | United States | 20.85 | |
| 4 | Brendan Christian | Antigua and Barbuda | 20.90 | |
| 5 | Adrian Durant | U.S. Virgin Islands | 21.16 | |
| 6 | Oral Thompson | Jamaica | 21.39 | |
| 7 | Jason Hunte | Barbados | 21.46 | |
| 8 | Emanuel Parris | Canada | 21.57 | |

=== 400 meters ===
Heats

| Rank | Heat | Name | Nationality | Time | Notes |
|---|---|---|---|---|---|
| 1 | 1 | Nathaniel McKinney | Bahamas | 46.50 | Q |
| 2 | 1 | Sekou Clarke | Jamaica | 46.72 | Q |
| 3 | 2 | Andrae Williams | Bahamas | 46.77 | Q |
| 4 | 2 | Tyler Christopher | Canada | 46.93 | Q |
| 5 | 2 | Wilan Louis | Barbados | 47.06 | Q |
| 6 | 2 | Craig Everhart | United States | 47.53 | q |
| 7 | 1 | Nathan Vadeboncoeur | Canada | 47.68 | Q |
| 8 | 2 | Melville Rogers | Saint Kitts and Nevis | 48.97 | q |
| 9 | 1 | René Marcelo Figueroa | El Salvador | 48.99 | |

Final

| Rank | Name | Nationality | Time | Notes |
|---|---|---|---|---|
| 1st place, gold medalist(s) | Tyler Christopher | Canada | 45.25 | |
| 2nd place, silver medalist(s) | Andrae Williams | Bahamas | 45.91 | |
| 3rd place, bronze medalist(s) | Sekou Clarke | Jamaica | 45.98 | |
| 4 | Craig Everhart | United States | 46.02 | |
| 5 | Wilan Louis | Barbados | 47.75 | |
| 6 | Fabián Martínez | Puerto Rico | 47.92 | |
| 7 | Melville Rogers | Saint Kitts and Nevis | 49.02 | |
| | Nathaniel McKinney | Bahamas | DNS | |

=== 800 meters ===
Heats

| Rank | Heat | Name | Nationality | Time | Notes |
|---|---|---|---|---|---|
| 1 | 1 | Martell Munguía | Mexico | 1:50.32 | Q |
| 2 | 1 | Erik Sproll | Canada | 1:50.71 | Q |
| 3 | 1 | James Hatch | United States | 1:50.90 | Q |
| 4 | 2 | John Carle | Canada | 1:50.94 | Q |
| 5 | 1 | Juan Almonte | Dominican Republic | 1:51.52 | q |
| 6 | 2 | Shaun Smith | Jamaica | 1:51.62 | Q |
| 7 | 2 | Marc Sylvester | United States | 1:52.00 | Q |
| 8 | 1 | Joewel Maldonado | Puerto Rico | 1:52.01 | q |
| 9 | 2 | José Vargas | Puerto Rico | 1:53.85 | |
| 10 | 1 | Andy Grant | Saint Vincent and the Grenadines | 1:54.53 | |
| 11 | 2 | Marco Vinicio Pérez | Costa Rica | 1:57.13 | |
| 12 | 2 | Rubén Quintanilla | El Salvador | 1:57.18 | |
| 13 | 1 | Ludence Smith | British Virgin Islands | 1:57.38 | |

Final

| Rank | Name | Nationality | Time | Notes |
|---|---|---|---|---|
| 1st place, gold medalist(s) | Marc Sylvester | United States | 1:48.60 | |
| 2nd place, silver medalist(s) | Shaun Smith | Jamaica | 1:49.28 | |
| 3rd place, bronze medalist(s) | Erik Sproll | Canada | 1:49.38 | |
| 4 | John Carle | Canada | 1:50.22 | |
| 5 | Martell Munguía | Mexico | 1:51.33 | |
| 6 | Juan Almonte | Dominican Republic | 1:51.59 | |
| 7 | James Hatch | United States | 1:51.70 | |
| 8 | Joewel Maldonado | Puerto Rico | 1:52.15 | |

=== 1500 meters ===
Final

| Rank | Name | Nationality | Time | Notes |
|---|---|---|---|---|
| 1st place, gold medalist(s) | Graeme Wells | Canada | 3:49.30 | |
| 2nd place, silver medalist(s) | Juan Almonte | Dominican Republic | 3:51.29 | |
| 3rd place, bronze medalist(s) | David Roulston | Canada | 3:52.12 | |
| 4 | Sean Jefferson | United States | 3:55.68 | |
| 5 | Julio César Pérez | Mexico | 3:57.63 | |
| 6 | José Vargas | Puerto Rico | 4:01.48 | |
| 7 | Andy Grant | Saint Vincent and the Grenadines | 4:08.27 | |

=== 5000 meters ===
Final

| Rank | Name | Nationality | Time | Notes |
|---|---|---|---|---|
| 1st place, gold medalist(s) | Edher Cortés | Mexico | 14:47.32 | |
| 2nd place, silver medalist(s) | Julio César Pérez | Mexico | 14:53.98 | |
| 3rd place, bronze medalist(s) | Ryan Sheehan | United States | 14:59.84 | |
| 4 | Víctor Nicolás Hernández | Guatemala | 15:16.39 | |
| | Ryan Weber | Canada | DNF | |
| | Kristjan Hunter | Canada | DNF | |

=== 3000 meters steeplechase ===
Final

| Rank | Name | Nationality | Time | Notes |
|---|---|---|---|---|
| 1st place, gold medalist(s) | Noé Durado | Mexico | 8:52.42 | |
| 2nd place, silver medalist(s) | Steve Zieminski | United States | 8:56.35 | |
| 3rd place, bronze medalist(s) | Ian Dobson | United States | 8:58.82 | |
| 4 | Johan Méndez | Puerto Rico | 9:11.66 | |
| 5 | Ryan Weber | Canada | 9:29.90 | |
| | Kristjan Hunter | Canada | DNF | |
| | Adilberto Méndez | Mexico | DQ | |

=== 110 meters hurdles ===
Final
Wind: -0.8 m/s

| Rank | Name | Nationality | Time | Notes |
|---|---|---|---|---|
| 1st place, gold medalist(s) | Joshua Walker | United States | 13.78 | |
| 2nd place, silver medalist(s) | Michael Mitchum | United States | 13.86 | |
| 3rd place, bronze medalist(s) | Ricardo Melbourne | Jamaica | 14.10 | |
| 4 | Richard Phillips | Jamaica | 14.14 | |
| 5 | Alleyne Lett | Grenada | 14.43 | |
| 6 | Javier Culson | Puerto Rico | 14.54 | |
| 7 | Christopher Bethel | Bahamas | 14.62 | |
| 8 | Andrés Amador | Puerto Rico | 14.96 | |

=== 400 meters hurdles ===
Heats

| Rank | Heat | Name | Nationality | Time | Notes |
|---|---|---|---|---|---|
| 1 | 2 | LaRon Bennett | United States | 49.88 | Q |
| 2 | 1 | Benjamin Wiggins | United States | 50.35 | Q |
| 3 | 2 | Douglas Lynes-Bell | Bahamas | 50.61 | Q |
| 4 | 2 | Isa Phillips | Jamaica | 50.64 | Q |
| 5 | 1 | Adrian Findlay | Jamaica | 51.45 | Q |
| 6 | 2 | Javier Culson | Puerto Rico | 52.03 | q |
| 7 | 1 | Wesley Rehel | Canada | 52.69 | Q |
| 8 | 1 | Shane Charles | Grenada | 53.24 | q |
| 9 | 1 | Paul Dennehy | El Salvador | 55.67 | |

Final

| Rank | Name | Nationality | Time | Notes |
|---|---|---|---|---|
| 1st place, gold medalist(s) | LaRon Bennett | United States | 49.40 | |
| 2nd place, silver medalist(s) | Benjamin Wiggins | United States | 49.93 | |
| 3rd place, bronze medalist(s) | Adrian Findlay | Jamaica | 49.95 | |
| 4 | Douglas Lynes-Bell | Bahamas | 50.66 | |
| 5 | Isa Phillips | Jamaica | 51.00 | |
| 6 | Javier Culson | Puerto Rico | 52.03 | |
| 7 | Shane Charles | Grenada | 53.05 | |

=== High jump ===
Final

| Rank | Name | Nationality | Attempts | | | | | | Result | Notes |
| Rank | Name | Nationality | 2.00 | 2.05 | 2.10 | 2.15 | 2.18 | 2.21 | Result | Notes |
|---|---|---|---|---|---|---|---|---|---|---|
| 1st place, gold medalist(s) | Keith Moffatt | United States | - | - | o | o | - | xxx | 2.15m | |
| 2nd place, silver medalist(s) | Teak Wilburn | United States | - | - | o | xxo | - | xxx | 2.15m | |
| 3rd place, bronze medalist(s) | Damon Thompson | Barbados | o | - | o | xxx | | | 2.10m | |
| 4 | Trevor Barry | Bahamas | - | - | xo | xxx | | | 2.10m | |

=== Pole vault ===
Final

| Rank | Name | Nationality | Attempts | | | | | | | Result | Notes |
| Rank | Name | Nationality | 4.60 | 4.75 | 4.90 | 5.00 | 5.10 | 5.20 | 5.30 | Result | Notes |
|---|---|---|---|---|---|---|---|---|---|---|---|
| 1st place, gold medalist(s) | Jonathan Takahashi | United States | - | - | xo | xxo | o | o | xxx | 5.20m | |
| 2nd place, silver medalist(s) | Christian Sánchez | Mexico | - | - | - | xo | xo | xxx | | 5.10m | |
| 3rd place, bronze medalist(s) | David Foley | Canada | o | o | xo | o | xxx | | | 5.00m | |
| 4 | Robert Hanson | Canada | o | xo | xxx | | | | | 4.75m | |

=== Long jump ===
Final

| Rank | Name | Nationality | Attempts | | | | | | Result | Notes |
| Rank | Name | Nationality | 1 | 2 | 3 | 4 | 5 | 6 | Result | Notes |
|---|---|---|---|---|---|---|---|---|---|---|
| 1st place, gold medalist(s) | Juaune Armon | United States | 7.42m (1.4) | 7.21m (-0.3) | 7.52m (1.1) | 7.20m (-1.4) | x (-0.7) | 7.32m w (2.1) | 7.52m (+1.1 m/s) | |
| 2nd place, silver medalist(s) | Matthew Mason | United States | x (-0.3) | 7.34m (-0.3) | 7.30m (-1.1) | 7.43m (-0.6) | 7.38m (-1.0) | 7.19m (0.2) | 7.43m (-0.6 m/s) | |
| 3rd place, bronze medalist(s) | Adrian Griffith | Bahamas | x (-1.0) | x (-0.3) | x (0.7) | 6.55m (-2.0) | x (-0.2) | 7.20m (0.3) | 7.20m (+0.3 m/s) | |
| 4 | Stephan Johnson | Cayman Islands | 7.01m (0.8) | x (1.7) | 6.84m (-0.6) | 5.15m (-1.5) | 5.71m (-0.9) | 7.15m (1.2) | 7.15m (+1.2 m/s) | |
| 5 | Stephane Richard | Canada | x (-0.5) | 6.23m (0.2) | 4.79m (-0.5) | x (-0.1) | x (-0.2) | 6.70m (-1.8) | 6.70m (-1.8 m/s) | |

=== Triple jump ===
Final

| Rank | Name | Nationality | Attempts | | | | | | Result | Notes |
| Rank | Name | Nationality | 1 | 2 | 3 | 4 | 5 | 6 | Result | Notes |
|---|---|---|---|---|---|---|---|---|---|---|
| 1st place, gold medalist(s) | Aarik Wilson | United States | x (-0.7) | 16.60m (-1.2) | 16.66m (0.4) | 15.52m (-0.4) | 16.52m (-0.9) | 16.69m (-0.6) | 16.69m (-0.6 m/s) | |
| 2nd place, silver medalist(s) | Allen Simms | United States | 15.79m (-0.6) | x (NWI) | 16.24m (-0.6) | x (NWI) | x (NWI) | x (NWI) | 16.24m (-0.6 m/s) | |
| 3rd place, bronze medalist(s) | Kenneth Sylvester | Jamaica | 14.94m (-0.5) | 15.67m (-0.4) | 15.73m (-0.6) | 15.52m (-0.5) | x (NWI) | 15.34m (-0.3) | 15.73m (-0.6 m/s) | |
| 4 | Samuel Payne | Barbados | x (NWI) | 15.00m (-0.6) | 15.03m (-0.1) | 14.95m (-0.0) | x (NWI) | 15.08m (-0.2) | 15.08m (-0.2 m/s) | |
| 5 | Fabian Florant | Dominica | x (NWI) | x (NWI) | 14.31m (-0.3) | x (NWI) | x (NWI) | 14.67m (-1.2) | 14.67m (-1.2 m/s) | |
| 6 | Stephane Richard | Canada | x (NWI) | x (NWI) | 14.42m (0.0) | x (NWI) | x (NWI) | 14.49m (0.0) | 14.49m (+0.0 m/s) | |

=== Shot put ===
Final

| Rank | Name | Nationality | Attempts | | | | | | Result | Notes |
| Rank | Name | Nationality | 1 | 2 | 3 | 4 | 5 | 6 | Result | Notes |
|---|---|---|---|---|---|---|---|---|---|---|
| 1st place, gold medalist(s) | Jeff Chakouian | United States | 18.36m | 18.05m | 18.48m | 18.74m | x | 18.32m | 18.74m | |
| 2nd place, silver medalist(s) | Dan Taylor | United States | 18.73m | 18.37m | x | x | 18.41m | x | 18.73m | |
| 3rd place, bronze medalist(s) | Dorian Scott | Jamaica | 17.62m | 17.28m | x | x | x | x | 17.62m | |
| 4 | James Steacy | Canada | x | 15.85m | 16.60m | 16.68m | 16.32m | 16.84m | 16.84m | |
| 5 | Jeff Wallis | Canada | x | 15.52m | 16.25m | x | 16.43m | 15.87m | 16.43m | |
| 6 | Jason Morgan | Jamaica | 15.05m | x | 15.23m | x | x | 14.95m | 15.23m | |

=== Discus throw ===
Final

| Rank | Name | Nationality | Attempts | | | | | | Result | Notes |
| Rank | Name | Nationality | 1 | 2 | 3 | 4 | 5 | 6 | Result | Notes |
|---|---|---|---|---|---|---|---|---|---|---|
| 1st place, gold medalist(s) | Michael Robertson | United States | x | 54.85m | 56.09m | x | 56.16m | 58.57m | 58.57m | |
| 2nd place, silver medalist(s) | Karl Erickson | United States | 54.58m | 54.27m | 55.83m | 54.50m | x | x | 55.83m | |
| 3rd place, bronze medalist(s) | James Steacy | Canada | x | 53.11m | x | x | x | 52.26m | 53.11m | |
| 4 | Eric Mathias | British Virgin Islands | 52.89m | 51.38m | 51.33m | 51.91m | x | x | 52.89m | |
| 5 | Jason Morgan | Jamaica | 50.17m | x | x | x | x | x | 50.17m | |
| 6 | Arthur Turland | Canada | 49.09m | 49.57m | 49.38m | 49.71m | 50.15m | x | 50.15m | |
| 7 | José Gonzalo May | Mexico | 42.60m | x | 46.19m | 46.53m | 46.00m | 47.54m | 47.54m | |

=== Hammer throw ===
Final

| Rank | Name | Nationality | Attempts | | | | | | Result | Notes |
| Rank | Name | Nationality | 1 | 2 | 3 | 4 | 5 | 6 | Result | Notes |
|---|---|---|---|---|---|---|---|---|---|---|
| 1st place, gold medalist(s) | James Steacy | Canada | x | 67.99m | 69.54m | x | 64.41m | 69.82m | 69.82m | |
| 2nd place, silver medalist(s) | Dan Taylor | United States | 62.47m | 63.13m | x | - | - | - | 63.13m | |
| 3rd place, bronze medalist(s) | Luis Martín García | Mexico | x | 58.27m | x | 58.23m | x | x | 58.27m | |
| 4 | John Smolenski | United States | 54.39m | x | x | 57.73m | x | x | 57.73m | |
| 5 | David Valdez | Mexico | 53.01m | 50.78m | x | 50.92m | 53.47m | x | 53.47m | |
| 6 | Diego Berríos | Guatemala | 49.76m | 49.86m | 50.37m | 49.77m | 49.89m | 52.85m | 52.85m | |
| 7 | Arthur Turland | Canada | x | 47.37m | 48.67m | x | 46.15m | x | 48.67m | |
| 8 | Gabriel Wilkenson | Bermuda | 47.42m | x | x | x | x | x | 47.42m | |

=== Javelin throw ===
Final

| Rank | Name | Nationality | Attempts | | | | | | Result | Notes |
| Rank | Name | Nationality | 1 | 2 | 3 | 4 | 5 | 6 | Result | Notes |
|---|---|---|---|---|---|---|---|---|---|---|
| 1st place, gold medalist(s) | Eric Brown | United States | 73.11m | 68.74m | 65.86m | x | 66.66m | 66.04m | 73.11m | |
| 2nd place, silver medalist(s) | Paul Pisano | United States | 70.37m | x | 68.38m | x | - | 63.97m | 70.37m | |
| 3rd place, bronze medalist(s) | Michael Harber | Canada | x | 64.06m | 63.06m | x | 61.65m | 66.37m | 66.37m | |
| 4 | Luis Enrique Guzmán | Mexico | x | 61.51m | x | 60.28m | 63.80m | x | 63.80m | |
| 5 | Robert Edwards | Canada | 56.49m | x | 54.42m | x | x | 53.71m | 56.49m | |
| 6 | Robert Kidd | Belize | x | 44.86m | 43.21m | x | 44.03m | 41.69m | 44.86m | |

=== Decathlon ===
Final

The highest mark recorded in each event is highlighted in yellow

| Rank | Name | Nationality | 100m | LJ | SP | HJ | 400m | 110m H | DT | PV | JT | 1500m | Points | Notes |
|---|---|---|---|---|---|---|---|---|---|---|---|---|---|---|
| 1st place, gold medalist(s) | James Hardee | United States | 10.94 (-1.3); 874pts | 6.72m (0.1); 748pts | 12.56m 640pts | 1.96m 767pts | 49.12; 856pts | 14.41 (-0.2); 922pts | 41.63m 698pts | 4.30m 702pts | 46.39m 535pts | 5:15.00; 476pts | 7218 | |
| 2nd place, silver medalist(s) | Travis Brandstatter | United States | 11.61 (-1.3); 730pts | 6.52m (0.6); 702pts | 12.26m 622pts | 1.96m 767pts | 50.74; 781pts | 14.44 (-0.2); 918pts | 35.56m 575pts | 4.60m 790pts | 55.84m 675pts | 4:59.75; 561pts | 7121 | |
| 3rd place, bronze medalist(s) | Jamie Adjetey-Nelson | Canada | 11.14 (-1.3); 830pts | 7.00m (-0.3); 814pts | 13.08m 672pts | 1.99m 794pts | 48.39; 890pts | 15.73 (-0.2); 763pts | 32.43m 512pts | 3.70m 535pts | 38.90m 426pts | 5:11.21; 497pts | 6733 | |
| 4 | Daniel Mezheritsky | Canada | 12.07 (-1.3); 637pts | 6.28m (0.6); 648pts | 13.15m 676pts | 1.84m 661pts | 53.53; 659pts | 15.68 (-0.2); 769pts | 36.76m 599pts | 4.30m 702pts | 48.24m 563pts | 5:11.24; 497pts | 6411 | |
| 5 | Luis Ríos | Mexico | 11.82 (-1.3); 687pts | 6.42m (0.1); 679pts | 10.20m 498pts | 1.75m 585pts | 52.93; 685pts | 17.67 (-0.2); 556pts | 28.93m 443pts | 4.30m 702pts | 48.35m 564pts | 4:38.41; 690pts | 6089 | |
| | Steven Marrero | Puerto Rico | 11.62 (-1.3); 728pts | 6.85m (0.9); 778pts | 13.11m 674pts | 1.78m 610pts | 50.26; 803pts | 17.25 (-0.2); 598pts | 40.13m 667pts | NH; 0pts | 47.00m 544pts | DNS; 0pts | DNF | |

=== 20,000 meters walk ===
Final

| Rank | Name | Nationality | Time | Notes |
|---|---|---|---|---|
| 1st place, gold medalist(s) | Horacio Nava | Mexico | 1:33:29 | |
| 2nd place, silver medalist(s) | Matthew Boyles | United States | 1:34:36 | |
| 3rd place, bronze medalist(s) | Álvaro García | Mexico | 1:36:15 | |
| 4 | Bernardo Calvo | Costa Rica | 1:38:15 | |
| 5 | Michael Tarantino | United States | 1:47:03 | |
| 6 | Donald Cote | Canada | 1:57:56 | |
| | Daniel Pendergast | United States | DNF | Guest |

=== 4x100 meters relay ===
Final

| Rank | Nation | Competitors | Time | Notes |
|---|---|---|---|---|
| 1st place, gold medalist(s) | United States | Wes Felix; Wallace Spearmon; Kyle Farmer; Ernest Wiggins | 39.03 | |
| 2nd place, silver medalist(s) | Barbados | Jamal Simmons; Andrew Hinds; Wilan Louis; Jason Hunte | 39.83 | |
| 3rd place, bronze medalist(s) | Bahamas | Fernander Lowell; Jarrell Forbes; Adrian Carey; Derrick Atkins | 40.24 | |
| 4 | Puerto Rico | Julio Calderón; Esteban Santiago; Andrés Amador; Adalberto Amador | 40.69 | |
| 5 | Dominican Republic | Irving Guerrero; John Smith; Juan Wilfredo; Juan Sainfleur | 41.30 | |
| 6 | Cayman Islands | Robert Ibeh; Stephan Johnson; Andre Burton; Keswick Wright | 42.21 | |
| | Canada | Anthony Garber; Curtis Fraser; Steven Wood; Emanuel Parris | DQ | |

=== 4x400 meters relay ===
Final

| Rank | Nation | Competitors | Time | Notes |
|---|---|---|---|---|
| 1st place, gold medalist(s) | United States | Craig Everhart; Benjamin Wiggins; LaRon Bennett; Andrew Rock | 3:02.36 | |
| 2nd place, silver medalist(s) | Jamaica | Orlando Reid; Oral Thompson; Isa Phillips; Adrian Findlay | 3:05.79 | |
| 3rd place, bronze medalist(s) | Barbados | Jason Hunte; Wilan Louis; Samuel Payne; Jamal Simmons | 3:11.54 | |
| 4 | Puerto Rico | Fabián Martínez; Adalberto Amador; Joewel Maldonado; Javier Culson | 3:13.66 | |
| 5 | Dominican Republic | Irving Guerrero; Juan Wilfredo; Juan Sainfleur; Juan Almonte | 3:18.00 | |
| | Bahamas | Michael Mathieu; Aaron Cleare; Nathaniel McKinney; Andrae Williams | DQ | |

== Women's results ==
=== 100 meters ===
Heats
Wind: Heat 1: -0.9 m/s, Heat 2: -2.5 m/s

| Rank | Heat | Name | Nationality | Time | Notes |
|---|---|---|---|---|---|
| 1 | 1 | Nadine Palmer | Jamaica | 11.47 | Q |
| 2 | 2 | Kerron Stewart | Jamaica | 11.64 | Q |
| 3 | 2 | Virginia Powell | United States | 11.78 | Q |
| 4 | 2 | Shandria Brown | Bahamas | 11.85 | Q |
| 5 | 1 | Genna Williams | Barbados | 11.92 | Q |
| 6 | 1 | Tonette Dyer | United States | 11.93 | Q |
| 7 | 1 | Nicole Buchholz | Canada | 12.03 | q |
| 8 | 2 | Jade Bailey | Barbados | 12.12 | q |
| 9 | 1 | María Carrión | Dominican Republic | 12.38 | |
| 10 | 2 | Yelmy Martínez | Dominican Republic | 12.45 | |
| 11 | 2 | Kettie Williams | Saint Vincent and the Grenadines | 12.73 | |
| 12 | 1 | Melissa Moraga | Costa Rica | 12.84 | |

Final
Wind: +0.0 m/s

| Rank | Name | Nationality | Time | Notes |
|---|---|---|---|---|
| 1st place, gold medalist(s) | Nadine Palmer | Jamaica | 11.39 | |
| 2nd place, silver medalist(s) | Kerron Stewart | Jamaica | 11.40 | |
| 3rd place, bronze medalist(s) | Virginia Powell | United States | 11.60 | |
| 4 | Shandria Brown | Bahamas | 11.77 | |
| 5 | Genna Williams | Barbados | 11.83 | |
| 6 | Nicole Buchholz | Canada | 11.95 | |
| 7 | Tonette Dyer | United States | 11.96 | |
| 8 | Jade Bailey | Barbados | 12.00 | |

=== 200 meters ===
Heats
Wind: Heat 1: -3.0 m/s, Heat 2: -3.5 m/s

| Rank | Heat | Name | Nationality | Time | Notes |
|---|---|---|---|---|---|
| 1 | 2 | Lakadron Ivery | United States | 24.37 | Q |
| 2 | 2 | Kerron Stewart | Jamaica | 24.66 | Q |
| 3 | 1 | Shernette Hyatt-Davis | Jamaica | 24.79 | Q |
| 4 | 1 | Amandi Rhett | United States | 25.01 | Q |
| 5 | 1 | Jade Bailey | Barbados | 25.06 | Q |
| 6 | 1 | Esther Akinsulie | Canada | 25.35 | q |
| 7 | 2 | Lian Lucas | Barbados | 25.51 | Q |
| 8 | 2 | Melissa Moraga | Costa Rica | 25.97 | q |
| 9 | 2 | Marleny Mejía | Dominican Republic | 26.03 | |
| 10 | 1 | Yelmy Martínez | Dominican Republic | 26.36 | |
| 11 | 1 | Amada Martínez | El Salvador | 27.45 | |

Final
Wind: -4.0 m/s

| Rank | Name | Nationality | Time | Notes |
|---|---|---|---|---|
| 1st place, gold medalist(s) | Lakadron Ivery | United States | 24.42 | |
| 2nd place, silver medalist(s) | Shernette Hyatt-Davis | Jamaica | 24.63 | |
| 3rd place, bronze medalist(s) | Amandi Rhett | United States | 24.71 | |
| 4 | Esther Akinsulie | Canada | 25.11 | |
| 5 | Kerron Stewart | Jamaica | 25.18 | |
| 6 | Lian Lucas | Barbados | 25.34 | |
| 7 | Jade Bailey | Barbados | 25.56 | |

=== 400 meters ===
Final

| Rank | Name | Nationality | Time | Notes |
|---|---|---|---|---|
| 1st place, gold medalist(s) | Tiandra Ponteen | Saint Kitts and Nevis | 51.19 | |
| 2nd place, silver medalist(s) | De'Hashia Trotter | United States | 51.46 | |
| 3rd place, bronze medalist(s) | Monique Henderson | United States | 51.67 | |
| 4 | Moya Thompson | Jamaica | 54.76 | |
| 5 | Mandy Upuu | Canada | 55.35 | |
| 6 | Melissa Moraga | Costa Rica | 58.37 | |

=== 800 meters ===
Final

| Rank | Name | Nationality | Time | Notes |
|---|---|---|---|---|
| 1st place, gold medalist(s) | Carlene Robinson | Jamaica | 2:04.04 | |
| 2nd place, silver medalist(s) | Julia Howard | Canada | 2:05.81 | |
| 3rd place, bronze medalist(s) | Brooke Patterson | United States | 2:06.62 | |
| 4 | Letitia Gilkes | Barbados | 2:07.74 | |
| 5 | Aneita Denton | Jamaica | 2:08.45 | |
| 6 | Lizaira del Valle | Puerto Rico | 2:11.16 | |
| 7 | Wendy Zúñiga | Costa Rica | 2:16.22 | |

=== 1500 meters ===
Final

| Rank | Name | Nationality | Time | Notes |
|---|---|---|---|---|
| 1st place, gold medalist(s) | Darolyn Trembath | Canada | 4:29.20 | |
| 2nd place, silver medalist(s) | Shannon Slater | Canada | 4:31.88 | |

=== 5000 meters ===
Final

| Rank | Name | Nationality | Time | Notes |
|---|---|---|---|---|
| 1st place, gold medalist(s) | Jamie Krzyminski | United States | 16:26.51 | |
| 2nd place, silver medalist(s) | Emily Kroshus | Canada | 16:54.53 | |
| 3rd place, bronze medalist(s) | María Elena Valencia | Mexico | 17:05.90 | |
| 4 | Karina Pérez | Mexico | 17:59.97 | |

=== 3000 meters steeplechase ===
Final

| Rank | Name | Nationality | Time | Notes |
|---|---|---|---|---|
| 1st place, gold medalist(s) | Amber Ferner | United States | 10:33.03 | |
| 2nd place, silver medalist(s) | Jinny Hanifan | United States | 10:48.54 | |
| 3rd place, bronze medalist(s) | Kristin Carpenter | Canada | 11:46.94 | |

=== 100 meters hurdles ===
Final
Wind: +0.0 m/s

| Rank | Name | Nationality | Time | Notes |
|---|---|---|---|---|
| 1st place, gold medalist(s) | Lori Jones | United States | 13.05 | |
| 2nd place, silver medalist(s) | Kasia Williams | Jamaica | 13.27 | |
| 3rd place, bronze medalist(s) | Hasani Roseby | United States | 13.27 | |
| 4 | Solymar Febles | Puerto Rico | 13.57 | |
| 5 | Melaine Walker | Jamaica | 13.86 | |
| 6 | Davina McKenzie | Bahamas | 14.31 | |
| 7 | Melanie Lachapelle | Canada | 14.65 | |

=== 400 meters hurdles ===
Final

| Rank | Name | Nationality | Time | Notes |
|---|---|---|---|---|
| 1st place, gold medalist(s) | Shevon Stoddart | Jamaica | 56.86 | |
| 2nd place, silver medalist(s) | Dominique Darden | United States | 57.02 | |
| 3rd place, bronze medalist(s) | Camille Robinson | Jamaica | 58.00 | |
| 4 | Holly Ratzlaff | Canada | 1:02.38 | |
| 5 | Marie-Claude Foley | Canada | 1:02.82 | |

=== High jump ===
Final

| Rank | Name | Nationality | Attempts | | | | | | | | | | Result | Notes |
| Rank | Name | Nationality | 1.65 | 1.70 | 1.73 | 1.76 | 1.79 | 1.82 | 1.85 | 1.87 | 1.89 | 1.91 | Result | Notes |
|---|---|---|---|---|---|---|---|---|---|---|---|---|---|---|
| 1st place, gold medalist(s) | Kaylene Wagner | United States | - | - | - | o | xo | xo | o | o | xo | xxx | 1.89m | |
| 2nd place, silver medalist(s) | Levern Spencer | Saint Lucia | - | - | o | o | o | o | xo | xxx | | | 1.85m | |
| 3rd place, bronze medalist(s) | Deirdre Mullen | United States | - | - | - | o | xo | xxx | | | | | 1.79m | |
| 4 | Kristen Matthews | Canada | - | - | o | - | xxo | xxx | | | | | 1.79m | |
| 5 | Desiree Crichlow | Barbados | - | xxo | xo | xxo | xxx | | | | | | 1.76m | |

=== Pole vault ===
Final

| Rank | Name | Nationality | Attempts | | | | | Result | Notes |
| Rank | Name | Nationality | 3.55 | 3.60 | 3.65 | 3.70 | 3.90 | Result | Notes |
|---|---|---|---|---|---|---|---|---|---|
| 1st place, gold medalist(s) | Cecilia Villar | Mexico | xxo | o | - | xxx | | 3.60m | |
| 2nd place, silver medalist(s) | Sue Kupper | Canada | - | xxo | xxx | | | 3.60m | |
| | Citlalli Huerta | Mexico | xxx | | | | | NH | |
| | Kate Soma | United States | - | - | - | - | xxx | NH | |
| | Chelsea Johnson | United States | - | - | - | - | xxx | NH | |
| | Kelsie Hendry | Canada | - | - | - | - | xxx | NH | |

=== Long jump ===
Final

| Rank | Name | Nationality | Attempts | | | | | | Result | Notes |
| Rank | Name | Nationality | 1 | 2 | 3 | 4 | 5 | 6 | Result | Notes |
|---|---|---|---|---|---|---|---|---|---|---|
| 1st place, gold medalist(s) | April Holliness | United States | 6.19m w (2.8) | 6.04m w (3.1) | x w (3.7) | x w (4.7) | 5.92m w (2.9) | 6.28m w (3.3) | 6.28m w (+3.3 m/s) | |
| 2nd place, silver medalist(s) | Kedine Geddes | Jamaica | 6.04m w (5.2) | 6.03m w (4.0) | 6.26m w (6.5) | 5.81m w (4.6) | 5.86m w (3.1) | 5.54m w (4.8) | 6.26m w (+6.5 m/s) | |
| 3rd place, bronze medalist(s) | Chelsea Hammond | Jamaica | x w (5.1) | 6.24m w (3.9) | x w (3.9) | 6.07m w (3.9) | 6.05m w (3.6) | 6.03m w (4.5) | 6.24m w (+3.9 m/s) | |
| 4 | María Espencer | Dominican Republic | 5.67m w (3.2) | 5.74m w (5.0) | 5.56m w (2.8) | x w (5.0) | 5.88m w (5.1) | 6.20m w (5.2) | 6.20m w (+5.2 m/s) | |
| 5 | Chioma Aduba | United States | 5.64m w (2.9) | 4.56m w (4.2) | 6.14m w (4.0) | 4.00m w (6.2) | 5.80m w (4.3) | 5.75m w (4.6) | 6.14m w (+4.0 m/s) | |
| 6 | Tanika Liburd | Saint Kitts and Nevis | x w (3.5) | 5.94m w (4.3) | x w (3.2) | 5.66m w (5.0) | 5.86m w (3.5) | 6.02m w (5.0) | 6.02m w (+5.0 m/s) | |
| 7 | Yuridia Bustamante | Mexico | 5.71m w (3.3) | x w (3.4) | 5.92m w (2.3) | x (1.3) | x w (4.4) | x w (6.1) | 5.92m w (+2.3 m/s) | |
| 8 | Melanie Lachapelle | Canada | x w (3.0) | 5.57m w (4.2) | 5.49m w (3.5) | 5.45m w (4.9) | x w (7.3) | x w (2.6) | 5.57m w (+4.2 m/s) | |

=== Triple jump ===
Final

| Rank | Name | Nationality | Attempts | | | | | | Result | Notes |
| Rank | Name | Nationality | 1 | 2 | 3 | 4 | 5 | 6 | Result | Notes |
|---|---|---|---|---|---|---|---|---|---|---|
| 1st place, gold medalist(s) | Chioma Aduba | United States | x (1.3) | x (1.0) | 12.73m (1.2) | x (1.0) | x (0.4) | 13.32m (0.5) | 13.32m (+0.5 m/s) | |
| 2nd place, silver medalist(s) | María Espencer | Dominican Republic | 12.25m (1.6) | x w (2.2) | x (0.1) | 12.14m (0.8) | x (0.4) | 12.80m w (2.2) | 12.80m w (+2.2 m/s) | |
| 3rd place, bronze medalist(s) | Luan Weekes | Barbados | 11.92m (2.0) | x (1.0) | x (1.0) | x (1.1) | 11.91m (-0.0) | x (0.7) | 11.92m (+2.0 m/s) | |
| 4 | Alanna Boudreau | Canada | 11.73m (0.8) | x (0.7) | 11.79m (-0.2) | x (1.1) | 11.71m (1.5) | x (-0.1) | 11.79m (-0.2 m/s) | |

=== Shot put ===
Final

| Rank | Name | Nationality | Attempts | | | | | | Result | Notes |
| Rank | Name | Nationality | 1 | 2 | 3 | 4 | 5 | 6 | Result | Notes |
|---|---|---|---|---|---|---|---|---|---|---|
| 1st place, gold medalist(s) | Laura Gerraughty | United States | 17.32m | x | x | x | 16.57m | - | 17.32m | |
| 2nd place, silver medalist(s) | Jillian Camarena | United States | 15.94m | 17.11m | x | 16.82m | x | 16.87m | 17.11m | |
| 3rd place, bronze medalist(s) | Zara Northover | Jamaica | 15.34m | 15.91m | 15.62m | 15.35m | x | 15.16m | 15.91m | |
| 4 | Megan Reid | Canada | 12.24m | 13.02m | 13.26m | 13.14m | 13.77m | 12.90m | 13.77m | |
| 5 | Sultana Frizell | Canada | 13.72m | x | x | - | - | - | 13.72m | |

=== Discus throw ===
Final

| Rank | Name | Nationality | Attempts | | | | | | Result | Notes |
| Rank | Name | Nationality | 1 | 2 | 3 | 4 | 5 | 6 | Result | Notes |
|---|---|---|---|---|---|---|---|---|---|---|
| 1st place, gold medalist(s) | Rebecca Breisch | United States | x | x | 52.51m | x | x | 53.26m | 53.26m | |
| | Julie Bourgon | Canada | 46.38m | x | x | 49.92m | 48.86m | 48.30m | 49.92m | Guest |
| 2nd place, silver medalist(s) | Dayana Octavien | United States | x | 48.95m | 44.75m | 48.24m | x | x | 48.95m | |
| 3rd place, bronze medalist(s) | Novelle Murray | Canada | x | 43.46m | x | 44.35m | 46.51m | 44.97m | 46.51m | |
| 4 | Daisy Van Ravensway | Canada | x | x | 41.53m | 41.98m | 42.45m | 43.76m | 43.76m | |

=== Hammer throw ===
Final

| Rank | Name | Nationality | Attempts | | | | | | Result | Notes |
| Rank | Name | Nationality | 1 | 2 | 3 | 4 | 5 | 6 | Result | Notes |
|---|---|---|---|---|---|---|---|---|---|---|
| 1st place, gold medalist(s) | Loree Smith | United States | 58.73m | 63.83m | 61.30m | 60.15m | x | | 63.83m | |
| 2nd place, silver medalist(s) | Jessica Cosby | United States | 56.95m | x | 57.39m | 63.70m | x | x | 63.70m | |
| | Michelle Fournier | Canada | x | 58.14m | x | x | x | | 58.14m | Guest |
| | Nathalie Thénor | Canada | x | 55.34m | 50.95m | x | x | 57.82m | 57.82m | Guest |
| 3rd place, bronze medalist(s) | Sultana Frizell | Canada | x | 48.38m | x | x | 57.38m | x | 57.38m | |
| 4 | Megan Reid | Canada | x | x | x | x | 55.28m | | 55.28m | |
| | Marie-Eve Boisselle | Canada | x | 47.19m | 51.14m | x | 50.18m | 51.77m | 51.77m | Guest |
| 5 | Iris Cristal García | Mexico | 43.14m | 46.75m | 47.80m | x | 45.84m | | 47.80m | |

=== Javelin throw ===
Final

| Rank | Name | Nationality | Attempts | | | | | | Result | Notes |
| Rank | Name | Nationality | 1 | 2 | 3 | 4 | 5 | 6 | Result | Notes |
|---|---|---|---|---|---|---|---|---|---|---|
| 1st place, gold medalist(s) | Dana Pounds | United States | 51.31m | 51.50m | 53.15m | x | 50.72m | 50.92m | 53.15m | |
| 2nd place, silver medalist(s) | Ana Érika Gutiérrez | Mexico | 47.49m | 44.34m | 48.89m | 46.42m | 49.49m | 48.13m | 49.49m | |
| 3rd place, bronze medalist(s) | Erma-Gene Evans | Saint Lucia | 45.95m | 46.52m | 44.17m | 46.84m | 48.86m | 44.82m | 48.86m | |
| | Dominique Bilodeau | Canada | 47.22m | x | 46.46m | 48.84m | 48.62m | x | 48.84m | Guest |
| 4 | Neely Falgout | United States | x | x | 44.15m | x | x | x | 44.15m | |
| 5 | Daisy Van Ravensway | Canada | 37.66m | x | 39.78m | x | 39.26m | x | 39.78m | |

=== Heptathlon ===
Final

The highest mark recorded in each event is highlighted in yellow

| Rank | Name | Nationality | 100m H | HJ | SP | 200m | LJ | JT | 800m | Points | Notes |
|---|---|---|---|---|---|---|---|---|---|---|---|
| 1st place, gold medalist(s) | Jacquelyn Johnson | United States | 13.81 (-0.3); 1005pts | 1.72m 879pts | 10.74m 578pts | 25.52 (-0.8); 840pts | 5.77m (1.8); 780pts | 41.06m 688pts | 2:28.27; 715pts | 5485 | |
| 2nd place, silver medalist(s) | Brooke Meredith | United States | 15.20 (-0.3); 815pts | 1.57m 701pts | 11.35m 618pts | 25.90 (-0.8); 806pts | 5.38m (1.9); 665pts | 40.02m 668pts | 2:23.59; 775pts | 5048 | |
| 3rd place, bronze medalist(s) | Samantha Anderson | Canada | 14.48 (-0.3); 912pts | 1.57m 701pts | 9.46m 494pts | 26.21 (-0.8); 779pts | 5.95m (1.4); 834pts | 28.23m 443pts | 2:21.54; 803pts | 4966 | |
| 4 | Juana Castillo | Dominican Republic | 15.18 (-0.3); 818pts | 1.66m 806pts | 11.26m 612pts | 26.92 (-0.8); 718pts | 5.01m (1.7); 562pts | 34.56m 563pts | 2:27.76; 721pts | 4800 | |
| 5 | Lindsay Tasche | Canada | 15.34 (-0.3); 797pts | 1.54m 666pts | 10.18m 541pts | 27.05 (-0.8); 708pts | 5.34m (1.5); 654pts | 32.36m 521pts | 2:30.55; 686pts | 4573 | |
| 6 | Mariana Abuela | Mexico | 15.90 (-0.3); 727pts | 1.57m 701pts | 9.00m 464pts | 27.10 (-0.8); 704pts | 5.21m (2.2); 617pts | 30.44m 485pts | 2:30.67; 685pts | 4383 | |
| | Idalis Quiles | Puerto Rico | 15.23 (-0.3); 811pts | 1.57m 701pts | 9.11m 471pts | DNF (-0.8); 0pts | DNS; 0pts | | | DNF | |

=== 10,000 meters walk ===
Final

| Rank | Name | Nationality | Time | Notes |
|---|---|---|---|---|
| 1st place, gold medalist(s) | Anne Favolice | United States | 52:12 | |
| 2nd place, silver medalist(s) | Daisy González | Mexico | 52:21 | |
| 3rd place, bronze medalist(s) | Fabiola Pérez | Mexico | 53:48 | |
| 4 | Christine Tagliaferri | United States | 57:11 | |
| 5 | Jeditza Arroyo | Puerto Rico | 59:30 | |

=== 4x100 meters relay ===
Final

| Rank | Nation | Competitors | Time | Notes |
|---|---|---|---|---|
| 1st place, gold medalist(s) | Jamaica | Kerron Stewart; Nadine Palmer; Shernette Hyatt-Davis; Alecia Sewell | 43.62 | |
| 2nd place, silver medalist(s) | United States | Lori Jones; Virginia Powell; Hasani Roseby; Lakadron Ivery | 43.63 | |
| 3rd place, bronze medalist(s) | Barbados | Lyn-Marie Cox; Genna Williams; Jade Bailey; Lian Lucas | 44.34 | |
| 4 | Canada | Elaine Hua; Esther Akinsulie; Nicole Buchholz; Nathalie Cherubin | 45.98 | |
| 5 | Dominican Republic | María Carrión; Marleny Mejía; Yelmy Martínez; Nelsy Delgado | 46.45 | |

=== 4x400 meters relay ===
Final

| Rank | Nation | Competitors | Time | Notes |
|---|---|---|---|---|
| 1st place, gold medalist(s) | United States | De'Hashia Trotter; Charlette Griggs; Cassandra Reed; Monique Henderson | 3:29.10 | |
| 2nd place, silver medalist(s) | Jamaica | Moya Thompson; Carlene Robinson; Shevon Stoddart; Camille Robinson | 3:35.42 | |
| 3rd place, bronze medalist(s) | Barbados | Lyn-Marie Cox; Genna Williams; Letitia Gilkes; Lian Lucas | 3:50.62 | |
| | Dominican Republic | Yelmy Martínez; Marleny Mejía; Nelsy Delgado; Juana Castillo | DQ | |
