= 2004 NACAC U23 Championships in Athletics =

III NACAC Under-23 Championships in Athletics
- Dates: July 30-August 1
- Host city: Sherbrooke, Canada
- Venue: Université de Sherbrooke Stadium
- Level: U-23
- Events: 42
- Participation: 243 athletes from 26 nations

The 3rd NACAC Under-23 Championships in Athletics were held in Sherbrooke, Quebec, Canada, on July 30-August 1, 2004. For the first time the event was open for athletes younger than 23 years rather than 25 years. A detailed report on the results was given.

== Medal summary ==
Medal winners are published. Complete results can be found on the Athletics Canada, on the AtletismoCR, and the CACAC website.

=== Men ===
Event	Gold		Silver		Bronze	
100 metres	Churandy Martina (AHO)	10.21	Ernest Wiggins (USA)	10.33	Sean Lambert (GRN)	10.40
200 metres	Wallace Spearmon (USA)	20.59	Churandy Martina (AHO)	20.75	Kyle Farmer (USA)	20.85
400 metres	Tyler Christopher (CAN)	45.25	Andrae Williams (BAH)	45.91	Sekou Clarke (JAM)	45.98
800 metres	Marc Sylvester (USA)	1:48.60	Shaun Smith (JAM)	1:49.28	Erik Sproll (CAN)	1:49.38
1500 metres	Graeme Wells (CAN)	3:49.30	Juan Almonte (DOM)	3:51.29	David Roulston (CAN)	3:52.12
5000 metres	Antonio Cortez (MEX)	14:47.32	Julio César Pérez (MEX)	14:53.98	Ryan Sheehan (USA)	14:59.84
3000 metres steeplechase	Noé Durado (MEX)	8:52.42	Steve Zieminski (USA)	8:56.35	Ian Dobson (USA)	8:58.82
110 metres hurdles	Josh Walker (USA)	13.78	Eric Mitchum (USA)	13.86	Ricardo Melbourne (JAM)	14.10
400 metres hurdles	LaRon Bennett (USA)	49.40	Ben Wiggins (USA)	49.93	Adrian Findlay (JAM)	49.95
High jump	Keith Moffatt (USA)	2.15m	Teak Wilburn (USA)	2.15m	Damon Thompson (BAR)	2.10m
Pole vault	Jon Takahashi (USA)	5.20m	Christián Sánchez (MEX)	5.10m	David Foley (CAN)	5.00m
Long jump	Juane Armon (USA)	7.52m	Matt Mason (USA)	7.43m	Adrian Griffith (BAH)	7.20m
Triple jump	Aarik Wilson (USA)	16.69m	Allen Simms (USA)	16.24m	Kenneth Sylvester (JAM)	15.73m
Shot put	Jeff Chakouian (USA)	18.74m	Dan Taylor (USA)	18.73m	Dorian Scott (JAM)	17.62m
Discus throw	Michael Robertson (USA)	58.57m	Karl Erickson (USA)	55.83m	Jim Steacy (CAN)	53.11m
Hammer throw	Jim Steacy (CAN)	69.82m	Dan Taylor (USA)	63.13m	Luis García (MEX)	58.27m
Javelin throw	Eric Brown (USA)	73.11m	Paul Pisano (USA)	70.37m	Michael Harber (CAN)	66.37m
Decathlon	Trey Hardee (USA)	7218 pts	Travis Brandstatter (USA)	7121 pts	Jamie Adjetey-Nelson (CAN)	6733 pts
20 Kilometres Road Walk	Horacio Nava (MEX)	1:33:29	Matthew Boyles (USA)	1:34:36	Álvaro García (MEX)	1:36:15
4 x 100 metres relay	United States; Wes Felix; Wallace Spearmon; Kyle Farmer; Ernest Wiggins	39.03	Barbados; Jamal Simmons; Andrew Hinds; Wilan Louis; Jason Hunte	39.83	Bahamas; Fernarder Lowell; Jerrell Forbes; Adrian Carey; Derrick Atkins	40.24
4 x 400 metres relay	United States; Craig Everhart; Benjamin Wiggins; LaRon Bennett; Andrew Rock	3:02.36	Jamaica; Orlando Reid; Oral Thompson; Isa Phillips; Adrian Findlay	3:05.79	Barbados; Jason Hunte; Wilan Louis; Samuel Payne; Jamal Simmons	3:11.54

=== Women ===
Event	Gold		Silver		Bronze	
100 metres	Nadine Palmer (JAM)	11.39	Kerron Stewart (JAM)	11.40	Virginia Powell (USA)	11.60
200 metres	Lakadron Ivery (USA)	24.42	Shernette Hyatt-Davis (JAM)	24.63	Amandi Rhett (USA)	24.71
400 metres	Tiandra Ponteen (SKN)	51.19	DeeDee Trotter (USA)	51.46	Monique Henderson (USA)	51.67
800 metres	Carlene Robinson (JAM)	2:04.04	Julia Howard (CAN)	2:05.81	Brooke Patterson (USA)	2:06.62
1500 metres	Darolyn Trembath (CAN)	4:29.20	Shannon Slater (CAN)	4:31.88		
5000 metres	Jamie Krzyminski (USA)	16:26.51	Emily Kroshus (CAN)	16:54.53	María Elena Valencia (MEX)	17:05.90
3000 metres steeplechase	Amber Ferner (USA)	10:33.03	Jinny Hanifan (USA)	10:48.54	Kristin Carpenter (CAN)	11:46.94
100 metres hurdles	Lolo Jones (USA)	13.05	Kasia Williams (JAM)	13.27	Sani Roseby (USA)	13.27
400 metres hurdles	Shevon Stoddart (JAM)	56.86	Dominique Darden (USA)	57.02	Camile Robinson (JAM)	58.00
High jump	Kaylene Wagner (USA)	1.87m	Levern Spencer (LCA)	1.85m	Kristen Matthews (CAN); Deirdre Mullen (USA)	1.79m
Pole vault	Cecilia Villar (MEX)	3.60m	Sue Kupper (CAN)	3.60m		
Long jump	April Holliness (USA)	6.28m w	Kedine Geddes (JAM)	6.26m w	Chelsea Hammond (JAM)	6.24m w
Triple jump	Chi Chi Aduba (USA)	13.32m	María Espencer (DOM)	12.80m w	Luan Weekes (BAR)	11.92m
Shot put	Laura Gerraughty (USA)	17.32m	Jillian Camarena (USA)	17.11m	Zara Northover (JAM)	15.91m
Discus throw^{†}	Becky Breisch (USA)	53.26m	Dayana Octavien (USA)	48.95m	Novelle Murray (CAN)	46.51m
Hammer throw^{‡}	Loree Smith (USA)	63.83m	Jessica Cosby (USA)	63.70m	Sultana Frizell (CAN)	57.38m
Javelin throw	Dana Pounds (USA)	53.15m	Ana Gutiérrez (MEX)	49.49m	Erma Gene Evans (LCA)	48.86m
Heptathlon	Jackie Johnson (USA)	5485 pts	Brooke Meredith (USA)	5048 pts	Samantha Anderson (CAN)	4966 pts
10 Kilometres Road Walk	Anne Favolice (USA)	52:12	Daisy González (MEX)	52:21	Fabiola Pérez (MEX)	53:48
4 x 100 metres relay	Jamaica; Kerron Stewart; Nadine Palmer; Shernette Hyatt-Davis; Alecia Sewell	43.62	United States; Lolo Jones; Virginia Powell; Sani Roseby; Lakadron Ivery	43.63	Barbados; Lyn-Marie Cox; Geena Williams; Jade Bailey; Lian Lucas	44.34
4 x 400 metres relay	United States; DeeDee Trotter; Charlette Griggs; Cassandra Reed; Monique Henderson	3:29.10	Jamaica; Moya Thompson; Carlene Robinson; Shevon Stoddart; Camille Robinson	3:35.42	Barbados; Lyn-Marie Cox; Geena Williams; Letitia Gilkes; Lian Lucas	3:50.62

^{†}: Julie Bourgon from Canada started as guest in the discus throw event and became 2nd with 49.92 m.
^{‡}: Michelle Fournier and Nathalie Thénor, both from Canada, started as guests in the hammer throw event and became 3rd and 4th with 58.14 m and 57.82 m, respectively.

== Medal table (unofficial) ==
* Host nation (Canada)

Rank	Nation	Gold	Silver	Bronze	Total
1	United States	28	21	9	58
2	Jamaica	4	7	8	19
3	Canada*	4	4	11	19
4	Mexico	4	4	4	12
5	Netherlands Antilles	1	1	0	2
6	Saint Kitts and Nevis	1	0	0	1
7	Dominican Republic	0	2	0	2
8	Barbados	0	1	5	6
9	Bahamas	0	1	2	3
10	Saint Lucia	0	1	1	2
11	Grenada	0	0	1	1
Totals (11 entries)		42	42	41	125

== Participation ==
The participation of 243 athletes from 26 countries was reported.

- Antigua and Barbuda (1)
- Aruba (1)
- Bahamas (10)
- Barbados (14)
- Belize (1)
- Bermuda (1)
- British Virgin Islands (1)
- Canada (48)
- Cayman Islands (3)
- Costa Rica (4)
- Dominica (1)
- Dominican Republic (8)
- El Salvador (4)
- Grenada (3)
- Guatemala (3)
- (Haiti) Haïti (1)
- Jamaica (28)
- (Mexico) México (21)
- Netherlands Antilles (1)
- Puerto Rico (14)
- Saint Kitts and Nevis (4)
- Saint Lucia (2)
- Saint Vincent and the Grenadines (2)
- Turks and Caicos Islands (1)
- United States (64)
- U.S. Virgin Islands (1)
