= 2003 Pan American Junior Athletics Championships =

XII Pan American Junior Athletics Championships
- Dates: 18–20 July
- Host city: Bridgetown, Barbados
- Venue: Barbados National Stadium
- Level: Junior
- Events: 43
- Participation: about 352 athletes from 31 nations

The 12th Pan American Junior Athletics Championships were held in Bridgetown, Barbados at the National Stadium on 18–20 July 2003. Jamaican sprinter Usain Bolt had the outstanding performance equalling the 200m World Junior record, while the team of the USA dominated the championships gaining 48 medals.

== Participation (unofficial) ==
Detailed result lists can be found on the CACAC, the CFPI, the USA Track & Field, and the "World Junior Athletics History" website. An unofficial count yields the number of about 352 athletes from about 31 countries: Antigua and Barbuda (7), Argentina (12), Bahamas (6), Barbados (17), Bolivia (1), Brazil (22), British Virgin Islands (2), Canada (46), Cayman Islands (1), Chile (14), Colombia (11), Costa Rica (2), Cuba (6), Dominica (2), Dominican Republic (3), Ecuador (6), El Salvador (3), Grenada (4), Guyana (3), Jamaica (34), Mexico (21), Netherlands Antilles (1), Nicaragua (1), Peru (5), Puerto Rico (11), Saint Lucia (5), Saint Vincent and the Grenadines (2), Trinidad and Tobago (14), United States (72), U.S. Virgin Islands (1), Venezuela (17).

== Medal summary ==
Medal winners are published. Complete results can be found on the CACAC, the CFPI on the USA Track & Field and on the "World Junior Athletics History" website.

=== Men ===
Event	Gold		Silver		Bronze	
100 metres	Churandy Martina (AHO)	10.33	Kenny O'Neal (USA)	10.42	Tesfa Latty (JAM)	10.47
200 metres	Usain Bolt (JAM)	20.13 WYB, =WJR, CR	David Neville (USA)	20.63	Jorge Sena (BRA)	20.70
400 metres	Ashton Collins (USA)	45.59	Jeremy Wariner (USA)	45.63	Michael Mathieu (BAH)	46.47
800 metres	Thiago Chyaromont (BRA)	1:48.76	Simeon Bovell (TRI)	1:49.54	Michael McGrath (USA)	1:50.16
1500 metres	Maury Surel Castillo (CUB)	3:47.13	Kurt Benninger (CAN)	3:49.08	Mike Woods (CAN)	3:50.93
5000 metres	Galen Rupp (USA)	14:20.29	Arturo Merced (MEX)	14:30.68	Maury Surel Castillo (CUB)	14:38.04
10,000 metres	Brett Gotcher (USA)	30:39.51	Jonathan Castañeda (MEX)	30:40.04	Deivis Sanches (VEN)	30:40.66
3000 metres steeplechase	Cristian Patiño (ECU)	9:05.70	Kevin Davis (USA)	9:06.20	Jean Calzadilla (VEN)	9:06.25
110 metres hurdles (Wind: +0.0 m/s)	Kenneth Ferguson (USA)	13.60	Dexter Faulk (USA)	13.82	Jesse King (BAR)	14.46
400 metres hurdles	Kenneth Ferguson (USA)	50.07	Isa Phillips (JAM)	50.95	Javier Culson (PUR)	51.10
4 × 100 metres relay	United States; Carlos Moore; Aaron Collins; Ashton Collins; Willie Hordge	39.29 PB	Jamaica; Winston Hutton; Tesfa Latty; Adrian Cephas; Usain Bolt	39.40 PB	Canada Jamie Adjetey-Nelson; Jonathan Suddaby; Julien Dugal	41.74
4 × 400 metres relay	United States; Elzie Coleman; Jeremy Wariner; Kenneth Fergusson; Ashton Collins	3:02.88 PB	Canada; Nathan Vadeboncoeur; Hank Palmer; David Pedneault; Cameron Sahaduth	3:11.56	Jamaica; Melhard Brown; Kiel Browne; Rohan Phipps; Isa Phillips	3:12.41
10,000 metres track walk	Francisco Flores (MEX)	46:27.34	Eder Sánchez (MEX)	46:27.41	Carlos Borgoño (CHI)	46:28.70
High jump	Keith Moffatt (USA)	2.20	Mark Dillon (CAN)	2.15	Michael Morrison (USA)	2.10
Pole vault	Germán Chiaraviglio (ARG)	5.15	João Gabriel Sousa (BRA)	5.00	Jason Wurster (CAN)	4.90
Long jump	Wilfredo Martínez (CUB)	7.70 (+0.2 m/s)	David Giralt (CUB)	7.63 (+0.0 m/s)	Ronald Hill (USA)	7.58 (+0.0 m/s)
Triple jump	David Giralt (CUB)	16.93 PB (−0.5 m/s)	Ayata Joseph (ATG)	16.29 (+0.1 m/s)	Leonardo dos Santos (BRA)	15.66 (+0.1 m/s)
Shot put	Garrett Johnson (USA)	19.95	Noah Bryant (USA)	19.40	Gustavo de Mendonça (BRA)	19.24
Discus throw	Gustavo de Mendonça (BRA)	58.76	Adam Kuehl (USA)	55.41	Jim Steacy (CAN)	55.26
Hammer throw	Jim Steacy (CAN)	70.70	Nick Owens (USA)	65.13	Leandro Benetti (ARG)	64.76
Javelin throw	Júlio César de Oliveira (BRA)	68.42	Justin Ryncavage (USA)	68.30	Thomas Jordan (USA)	63.57
Decathlon	Donavan Kilmartin (USA)	7486 CR	Matías López (ARG)	6635	Freddy Díaz (VEN)	6616

=== Women ===
Event	Gold		Silver		Bronze	
100 metres	Shalonda Solomon (USA)	11.35	Sherone Simpson (JAM)	11.44	Wanda Hutson (TRI)	11.58
200 metres (Wind: +0.0 m/s)	Shalonda Solomon (USA)	22.93 CR	Anneisha McLaughlin (JAM)	23.34	Shana Cox (USA)	23.39
400 metres	Stephanie Smith (USA)	52.52	Angel Perkins (USA)	52.76	Sonita Sutherland (JAM)	53.56
800 metres	Yuneisi Santiusti (CUB)	2:04.78	Kayann Thompson (JAM)	2:05.54	Carlene Robinson (JAM)	2:06.51
1500 metres	Yuneisi Santiusti (CUB)	4:24.56	Chantelle Dron (USA)	4:26.66	Elizabeth Maloy (USA)	4:26.87
3000 metres	Inés Melchor (PER)	9:57.96	Laura Zeigle (USA)	10:04.18	Ángela Figueroa (COL)	10:06.95
5000 metres	Inés Melchor (PER)	16:53.37	Suzanna Larsen (USA)	17:09.20	Amber Sayer (USA)	17:46.34
2000 metres steeplechase (exhibition)	Angela Marvin (USA)	6:37.84	Kelly Siefker (USA)	6:40.87	Ángela Figueroa (COL)	6:51.31
100 metres hurdles	Dawn Harper (USA)	13.42	Alandra Sherman (USA)	13.80	Keisha Brown (JAM)	13.86
400 metres hurdles	Amanda Dias (BRA)	58.09	Josanne Lucas (TRI)	58.43	Mackenzie Hill (USA)	58.61
4 × 100 metres relay	United States; Ashley Owens; Juanita Broaddus; Alandra Sherman; Shalonda Solomon	44.00	Jamaica; Jodi-Ann Powell; Simone Facey; Anneisha McLaughlin; Sherone Simpson	44.24	Trinidad and Tobago; Kerry Barrow; Wanda Hutson; Monique Cabral; Kelly-Ann Baptiste	45.15
4 × 400 metres relay	United States; Jasmine Lee; Angel Perkins; Natasha Hastings; Stephanie Smith	3:34.08	Jamaica; Camille Robinson; Sonita Sutherland; Maxine Foster; Carlene Robinson	3:41.26	Canada; Alicia Brown; Bailey Lewis; Holly Ratzlaff; Patricia Mayers	3:43.54
10,000 metres track walk	Alessandra Picagevicz (BRA)	52:27.57	Josette Sepúlveda (CHI)	53:04.51	Johana Malla (ECU)	53:39.42
High jump	Sharon Day (USA)	1.85	Levern Spencer (LCA)	1.83	Chaunté Howard (USA)	1.81
Pole vault	Julene Bailey (USA)	4.05 CR	Kira Costa (USA); Karla da Silva (BRA)	4.00		
Long jump	Yudelkis Fernández (CUB)	6.46 CR (−0.4 m/s)	Yuridia Bustamante (MEX)	6.20 (+0.0 m/s)	Renee Williams (USA)	6.19 (−0.4 m/s)
Triple jump	Yudelkis Fernández (CUB)	13.89 CR (+0.0 m/s)	Alyce Williams (USA)	12.87 (+0.5 m/s)	Desiree Crichlow (BAR)	12.86 (+0.1 m/s)
Shot put	Michelle Carter (USA)	16.23	Zara Northover (JAM)	14.46	Jennifer Dahlgren (ARG)	14.26
Discus throw	Amarachi Ukabam (USA)	52.05	Beth Mallory (USA)	50.91	Shernelle Nicholls (BAR)	40.64
Hammer throw	Jennifer Dahlgren (ARG)	58.61	Beth Mallory (USA)	57.75	Adriana Benaventa (VEN)	56.81
Javelin throw	Erma Gene Evans (LCA)	49.67	Krista Woodward (CAN)	48.90	Dalila Rugama (NCA)	48.61
Heptathlon	Juana Castillo (DOM)	5381	Nadina Marsh (JAM)	5135	Janine Polischuk (CAN)	5101

== Medal table (unofficial) ==
The medal count has been published. It is in agreement with the following unofficial medal count.

* Host nation (Barbados)

Rank	Nation	Gold	Silver	Bronze	Total
1	United States	20	18	10	48
2	Cuba	7	1	1	9
3	Brazil	5	2	3	10
4	Argentina	2	1	2	5
5	Peru	2	0	0	2
6	Jamaica	1	9	5	15
7	Canada	1	4	6	11
8	Mexico	1	4	0	5
9	Saint Lucia	1	1	0	2
10	Ecuador	1	0	1	2
11	Dominican Republic	1	0	0	1
11	Netherlands Antilles	1	0	0	1
13	Trinidad and Tobago	0	2	2	4
14	Chile	0	1	1	2
15	Antigua and Barbuda	0	1	0	1
16	Venezuela	0	0	4	4
17	Barbados*	0	0	3	3
18	Bahamas	0	0	1	1
18	Colombia	0	0	1	1
18	Nicaragua	0	0	1	1
18	Puerto Rico	0	0	1	1
Totals (21 entries)		43	44	42	129
