= Adrian Durant =

Head coach for Cornell University Men's Cross Country and Track and Field teams

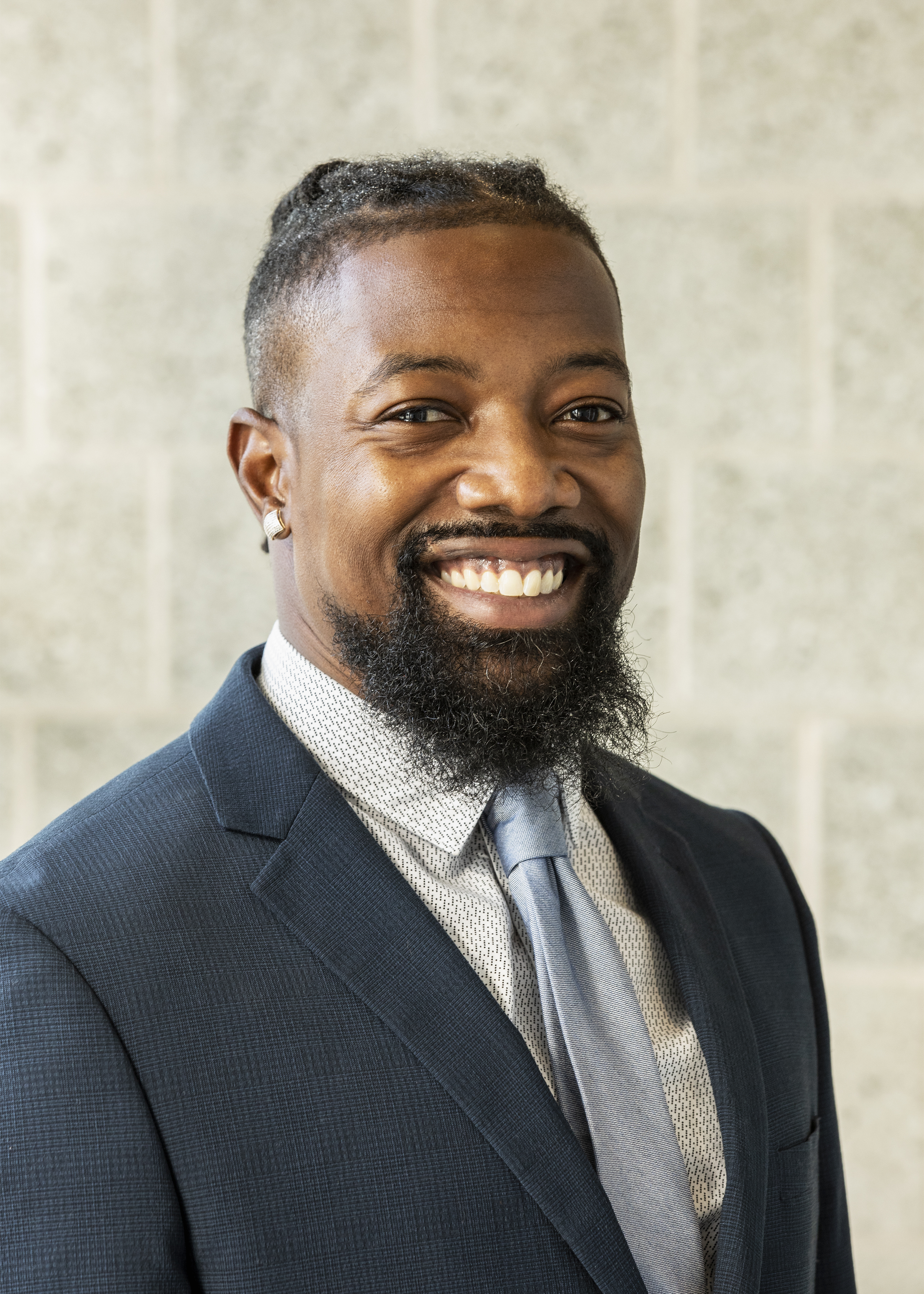

Current position
- Title: Head Coach
- Team: Cornell University
- Conference: Ivy League

Biographical details
- Born: October 16, 1984 (age 42); Saint Croix, U.S. Virgin Islands
- Education: University of South Carolina

Playing career
- Position: Sprinter

Coaching career (HC unless noted)
- 2010–2012: FAMU (assistant)
- 2012 - present: Cornell

Accomplishments and honors

Championships
- 2016 Outdoor Ivy League Heptagonal Championship

Awards
- 2016 Ivy League Northeast Region Men’s Coach of the Year 2017 Ivy League Northeast Region Men’s Coach of the Year

Records
- 2016: Highest Ivy League Point Score (211 points)

Adrian Durant (born October 16, 1984) is the head coach for the Cornell University Men’s Cross Country and Track and Field teams.

An Olympian and former world-class sprinter Durant and now specializes in coaching the sprints, hurdling events, and relays.

Durant served as head coach for the U.S. Virgin Islands track and field team at the 2016 Olympic Games. He also coached Cornell alumnus, Spanish National record holder, European Champion, and Olympic team member Bruno Hortelano who suffered a “catastrophic hand injury” in a drunk driving incident following the Rio Olympics.

Prior to Cornell Durant was a member the coaching staff of the Florida A&M Rattlers where he primarily coached jumps and sprints.

== Coaching career ==
In his first year at Cornell Durant’s athletes achieved were responsible for 68 of the Big Red’s points at the Outdoor Ivy League Heptagonal Championship. Durant led the men’s 4x100m relay to the NCAA Championship with a time of 39.85, the fastest time in the Ivy League since 1978.

As Assistant Coach in 2014, Durant helped lead the Men’s 4x100 and 4x400 relay teams to Ivy League Outdoor Heptagonal Titles. Durant’s athletes scored 79 of the Big Red’s 148.99 points to capture the Outdoor Heptagonal Championship.

At the 2015 Outdoor Heptagonal Championship, Durant’s athletes once again dominated the relay events claiming victory in both the 4x100m and 4x400m. His sprinters and hurdlers picked up 60 of the Big Reds points in a very close and competitive meet.

During Durant’s first year as head coach, his team won the 2016 Outdoor Ivy League Heptagonal Championship title with a record point score of 211.00 points - the only team in conference history to score over 200 points in a single championship.

In the 2016-17 year, Durant coached his team to a 2nd place finish at both the Indoor and the Outdoor Heptagonal Championships and ranked as the top team in the Northeast Region.

Before coming to Cornell, Durant was part of the coaching staff at Florida A&M University, where he coached All-American and MEAC Champions Leon Hunt (Long Jump) and Stephen Emere (Triple Jump).

Durant continues to work alongside former Cornell Head Coach Coach Nathan Taylor as a member of the U.S. Virgin Islands Track & Field Federation.

== Coaching achievements ==
- 2016 Outdoor Ivy League Heptagonal Championship
- 2016 Northeast Region Men’s Coach of the Year
- 2015-2016 Ivy League Men’s Outdoor Coach of the Year
- 2017 Northeast Region Men’s Coach of the Year
- Coached Bruno Hortelano European Champion in the 200m, Spanish National record holder in the 100m(10.06) and 200m (20.12) and 10th place overall at the 2016 Olympic Games
- Coached 4 Heptagonal Championship teams
- Coached 21 Ivy League Heptagonal individual Champions
- 11 Heptagonal relay titles6 Ivy League MVPs
- 5 Ivy League Records
- 15 NCAA All-Americans

== Early life ==
Born in Christiansted, St. Croix, U.S. Virgin Islands, Adrian was an athlete and captain of the United States Virgin National Team. He holds both junior and senior records in the US. Virgin Island national team.

Durant’s collegiate career began at University of South Carolina Gamecocks (2003-2007) where he earned All-American Status on the 4x400m relay team (2003) and ran the opening leg of the 4x400m relay team that finished 1st at the 2003 SEC Championships with a time of 3:04.66.

Durant also earned multiple All-Regional and Academic All-Conference Honors and made several appearances at NCAA Championship with personal bests of 10.37 in the 100m, 20.83 in the 200m and 6.69* in the 60m dashes.

== International competitions ==
Year	Competition	Venue	Position	Event	Notes
Representing the United States Virgin Islands
2002	World Junior Championships	Kingston, Jamaica	67th (h)	100m	11.30 (wind: +0.7 m/s)
2002	Central American and Caribbean Games	San Salvador, El Salvador	5th (h)	400m	49.04
2004	NACAC U-23 Championships	Sherbrooke, Canada	5th (h)	100m	10.53 (wind: 0.0 m/s)
2004	NACAC U-23 Championships	Sherbrooke, Canada	5th	200m	21.16 (wind: +0.0 m/s)
2006	NACAC U-23 Championships	Santo Domingo, Dominican Republic	16th (sf)	100m	10.91 (wind: +0.7 m/s)
