= Jade Bailey =

Jade Bailey may refer to:

- Jade Bailey (athlete) (born 1983), Barbadian track and field sprint athlete
- Jade Bailey (footballer) (born 1995), Jamaican footballer
