= Matthew Boyles =

American race walker

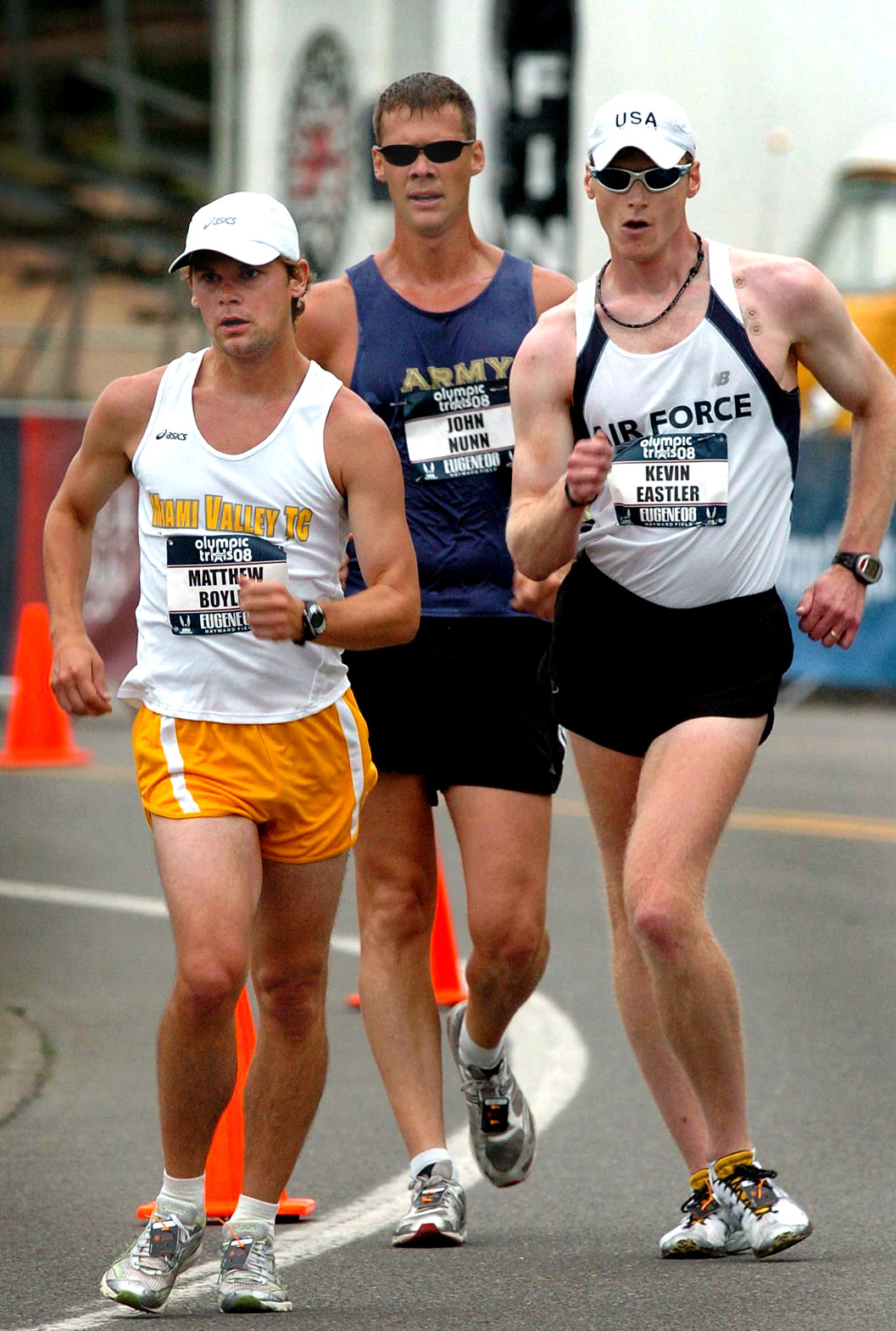
- Matthew Boyles (left), John Nunn and Kevin Eastler at the 20 km US Olympic Trials in 2008

Personal information
- Born: September 15, 1982 (age 43) Parkersburg, West Virginia, United States
- Education: University of Rio Grande
- Height: 5 ft 6 in (1.68 m)
- Weight: 135 lb (61 kg)

Sport
- Sport: Race walking
- Club: Miami Valley TC
- Coached by: Vince Peters

Matthew Boyles (born September 15, 1982) is an American race walker. He attended the University of Rio Grande and competed at the 2007 Pan American Games.

== Achievements ==
Year	Competition	Venue	Position	Event	Notes
2002	World Race Walking Cup	Turin, Italy	74th	20 km	1:39:02
2004	NACAC U-23 Championships	Sherbrooke, Canada	2nd	20,000 m	1:34:36
2006	World Race Walking Cup	A Coruña, Spain	74th	20 km	1:32:29
2007	Pan American Games	Rio de Janeiro, Brazil	5th	20 km	1:30:03
