= Shevon Nieto =

Jamaican hurdler and a singer

Personal information
- Full name: Shevon Kaiwana Stoddart
- Born: 21 November 1982 (age 43) Jamaica
- Height: 1.65 m (5 ft 5 in)
- Weight: 120

Sport
- Country: Jamaica
- Sport: Athletics
- Event: Hurdling
Medal record
Representing Jamaica
Central American and Caribbean Games
Silver medal – second place	2006 Cartagena	4 × 400 m relay
- Updated on 27 January 2015

Shevon Kaiwana Nieto (née Stoddart; born 21 November 1982) is a Jamaican former hurdler.

She won the bronze medal at the 2005 Central American and Caribbean Championships and finished fifth at the 2006 Commonwealth Games. At the 2006 Central American and Caribbean Games she won a silver medal in 4 × 400 metres relay.

She also competed at the 2004 Olympic Games and the 2005 World Championships without reaching the final.

She made her 2nd Olympic team in 2008 held in Beijing, China and represented Jamaica in the 400 hurdles. In 2015, she made her 3rd World Championship team in Beijing, China representing Jamaica in the 400 hurdles. Her personal best time is 54.47 seconds, achieved in June 2005 in Sacramento.

She attended the University of South Carolina on a track scholarship.

Shevon is also a singer and participant in the Art of the Olympians. In 2017, she married Olympic high jumper Jamie Nieto, who suffered a serious injury during a coaching mishap, leaving him partially paralyzed. In 2020, she sang an original song dedicated to her husband on America's Got Talent.

== Personal bests ==
Event	Result	Venue	Date
Outdoor
200 m	23.59 s (wind: +1.9 m/s)	San Diego, United States	29 March 2014
400 m	52.89 s	Ponce, Puerto Rico	19 May 2007
800 m	2:11.31	Pasadena, United States	23 March 2012
100 m hurdles	13.41 s (wind: +1.0 m/s)	Nashville, United States	15 May 2005
400 m hurdles	54.47 s	Sacramento, United States	11 June 2005
Indoor
200 m	23.55 s	Fayetteville, United States	26 February 2005
400 m	52.55 s	Fayetteville, United States	11 March 2005
60 m hurdles	8.48 s	Fayetteville, United States	24 February 2002

== Competition record ==
Year	Competition	Venue	Position	Event	Notes
Representing Jamaica
2004	NACAC Under-23 Championships	Sherbrooke, Canada	1st	400 m hurdles	56.86
2004	NACAC Under-23 Championships	Sherbrooke, Canada	2nd	4 × 400 m relay	3:35.42
2004	Olympic Games	Athens, Greece	28th (h)	400 m hurdles	56.61
2005	Central American and Caribbean Championships	Nassau, Bahamas	3rd	400 m hurdles	56.64
2005	World Championships	Helsinki, Finland	19th (sf)	400 m hurdles	56.49
2006	Commonwealth Games	Melbourne, Australia	5th	400 m hurdles	56.67
2006	Central American and Caribbean Games	Cartagena, Colombia	4th	400 m hurdles	57.13
2006	Central American and Caribbean Games	Cartagena, Colombia	2nd	4 × 400 m relay	3:32.86
2007	Pan American Games	Rio de Janeiro, Brazil	4th	400 m hurdles	55.42
2008	Olympic Games	Beijing, China	17th (h)	400 m hurdles	56.52
2014	Pan American Sports Festival	Mexico City, Mexico	4th	400 m hurdles	56.88 A
2015	World Championships	Beijing, China	27th (h)	400 m hurdles	56.60
