= Laura Gerraughty =

American shot putter (born 1983)

Personal information
- Born: July 29, 1983 (age 42) Nashua, New Hampshire, United States

Sport
- Sport: Track and field
Medal record
Representing United States
World Junior Championships
Bronze medal – third place	2002 Kingston	Shot put

Laura Gerraughty (born July 29, 1983) is an American former shot putter.

Laura began throwing as a sophomore in high school in her hometown of Nashua, New Hampshire. She went on to represent the University of North Carolina at Chapel Hill in the shot, discus, hammer, and weight throws under event coach Brian Blutreich and head coach Dennis Craddock. Gerraughty holds school records in each of these events. She holds a combined 13 Atlantic Coast Conference Championships individual event titles in these events, as well as 10 NCAA Division I All-America honors.

She finished fourth at the 2000 World Junior Championships in Santiago, Chile and won the bronze medal at the 2002 World Junior Championships in Kingston, Jamaica. She then competed at the 2004 Olympic Games without reaching the final round.

Her personal best throw is 19.15 metres, achieved in March 2004 at the NCAA Division I Indoor Track & Field Championships. This is the farthest throw by any NCAA Division I female shot putter, indoors or outdoors. In that same year, Laura also won the NCAA Division I Outdoor Track & Field Championships, the USA Track & Field Indoor National Championships, and the USA Track & Field Outdoor National Championships (the 2004 U.S. Olympic Trials).

Following her collegiate career, Laura competed briefly for Nike, Inc., representing the company at the 2005 USA Track & Field Outdoor National Championships. Her career was later ended due to injury. She went on to coach the throws for her alma mater for two seasons.

Laura Gerraughty, now Laura Ekstrand, lives with her family in Tyngsborough, Massachusetts.

== International competitions ==
Year	Competition	Venue	Position	Notes
Representing the United States
2000	World Junior Championships	Santiago, Chile	4th	15.71 m
2002	World Junior Championships	Kingston, Jamaica	3rd	16.62 m
2003	Pan American Games	Santo Domingo, Dominican Republic	5th	17.33 m
2004	NACAC U-23 Championships	Sherbrooke, Canada	1st	17.32m
2004	Olympic Games	Athens, Greece	26th	16.47 m
