= Jim Steacy =

Canadian hammer thrower

Personal information
- Born: 29 May 1984 (age 42) Saskatoon, Saskatchewan, Canada
- Height: 1.91 m (6 ft 3 in)
- Weight: 125 kg (276 lb)

Sport
- Country: Canada
- Sport: Athletics
- Event: Hammer throw
- Coached by: Larry Steinke

Achievements and titles
- Personal best: 79.13m

James Steacy (born 29 May 1984) is a Canadian hammer thrower from. His personal best of 79.13 metres, achieved in May 2008 in Lethbridge, Alberta, stood as the Canadian record until 2023. He represented Canada at the 2008 and 2012 Summer Olympics. With a top 12 finish at the 2008 Summer Olympics, he became the first Canadian in 84 years to reach the Olympic hammer throw final. Competing for University of Lethbridge, he is a five time CIS national champion in the weight throw and is the current CIS record holder in the event. He is the older brother of Canadian hammer thrower Heather Steacy. He currently serves as a police officer for Lethbridge Police Service, in Lethbridge, Alberta.

== Achievements ==
| Year | Competition | Venue | Position | Event | Notes |
Representing Canada
| 2001 | World Youth Championships | Debrecen, Hungary | 29th (q) | Discus throw (1.5 kg) | 43.03 m |
| 2001 | World Youth Championships | Debrecen, Hungary | 23rd (q) | Hammer throw (5 kg) | 63.40 m |
| 2003 | Pan American Junior Championships | Bridgetown, Barbados | 1st | Hammer throw (6 kg) | 70.70 m |
| 2004 | NACAC U-23 Championships | Sherbrooke, Canada | 4th | Shot put | 16.84 m |
| 2004 | NACAC U-23 Championships | Sherbrooke, Canada | 3rd | Discus | 53.11 m |
| 2004 | NACAC U-23 Championships | Sherbrooke, Canada | 1st | Hammer | 69.82 m |
| 2005 | Universiade | İzmir, Turkey | 18th (q) | Discus throw | 49.50 m |
| 2005 | Universiade | İzmir, Turkey | 10th | Hammer throw | 66.51 m |
| 2005 | Jeux de la Francophonie | Niamey, Niger | 5th | Discus throw | 50.99 m |
| 2005 | Jeux de la Francophonie | Niamey, Niger | 1st | Hammer throw | 71.90 m |
| 2006 | Commonwealth Games | Melbourne, Australia | 2nd | Hammer throw | 74.75 m |
| 2006 | World Cup | Athens, Greece | 6th | Hammer throw | 74.04 m |
| 2007 | Pan American Games | Rio de Janeiro, Brazil | 1st | Hammer throw | 73.77 m |
| 2007 | World Championships | Osaka, Japan | 13th (q) | Hammer throw | 74.11 m |
| 2008 | Olympic Games | Beijing, China | 12th | Hammer throw | 75.72 m |
| 2009 | Universiade | Belgrade, Serbia | 2nd | Hammer throw | 74.88 m |
| 2011 | World Championships | Daegu, South Korea | 19th (q) | Hammer throw | 73.32 m |
| 2012 | Olympic Games | London, United Kingdom | – | Hammer throw | NM |
| 2013 | Jeux de la Francophonie | Nice, France | 5th | Hammer throw | 70.34 m |
| 2014 | Commonwealth Games | Glasgow, United Kingdom | 1st | Hammer throw | 74.16 m |
| 2015 | Pan American Games | Toronto, Canada | 8th | Hammer throw | 69.75 m |

== See also ==
- Canadian records in track and field
