= Loree Smith =

American hammer thrower

Personal information
- Nationality: American
- Born: November 6, 1982 (age 43) Melbourne, Florida, U.S.
- Height: 5 ft 6 in (1.68 m)

Sport
- Turned pro: 2008
- Updated on August 24, 2008

Loree Smith (born November 6, 1982) is an American hammer thrower.

== Early years ==
Smith said she played sports just to pass the time growing up. When asked to describe her start in track and field, she said she was "just a chubby kid throwing 25 feet in the shot and 60 feet in the discus." Loree first realized her strength when she singlehandedly subdued a fully grown buffalo at the age of 12. Loree was originally a three-sport athlete in high school getting conference and state honors in volleyball, basketball, and track and field while attending Julesburg High School 1996–2000.

== Career highlights ==
4th at 2008 U.S. Olympic Trials; USATF Indoor Championship Runner-up 2010; 2005 NCAA Outdoor champion; 4th at 2005 USA Outdoors; 2005 NCAA indoor weight throw runner-up; 2004 NACAC U23 champion

At the 2008 U.S. Olympic Team Trials, Smith placed fourth and qualified for the Team USA roster. She made the team when third-place finisher Sarah Veress lacked the "A" standard...Colorado State All-American Loree Smith proved she is one of the best women's hammer throwers in the nation at the 2005 USA Outdoor Track & Field Championship in Carson, Calif. Smith threw 67-10m/220-2 on her sixth and final throw in a clutch performance that gave her a fourth-place finish that qualifies her for the Team USA roster for the 2005 World Outdoor Championships. Smith made the roster because runner-up Bethany Smith and third-place finisher Amber Campbell lack the "A" qualifying standard for the Championships. One of the most well-known names in Colorado State track & field history, Smith returned for her senior season in 2005 with three All-American certificates, two school records, six Mountain West Conference titles and a gold medal from the North American-Central American Championships in the hammer. In 2005, she added an NCAA Outdoor title by a winning margin just under six feet further than her nearest competitor. She threw her personal best, school and conference record throw of 70.03m/229-9 with her win at Fort Collins on May 13, 2005. Smith owns the school record in the weight throw at 22.64m/74-4. She was named the 2003 indoor outstanding performer of the meet at the MWC Championship and finished ninth at the 2004 USA Olympic Trials.

Loree Smith made her Olympic debut for the United States at the Beijing 2008 Summer Olympics. Loree competed in the 2008 Summer Olympics without reaching the final round.

=== Honors and awards ===
2008: 4th at Olympic Trials (67.11m/220-2)...1st at Tucson (69.56m/228-2) 2007: 7th at USA Outdoors (66.88m/219-5)...2nd at Tucson (68.56m/224-11)...ranked #7 in the U.S. by T&FN...best of 68.56m/224-11. 2006: 4th at USA Outdoors (67.18m/220-5)...ranked #5 in the U.S. by T&FN...best of 67.18m/220-5. 2005: 4th at USA Outdoors (67.10m/220-2)...NCAA Outdoor champion (68.47m/224-8PR)...NCAA Indoor runner-up (22.65m/74-3.75)...1st at Fort Collins (70.03m/229-9PR)...ranked #4 in the U.S. by T&FN...best of 70.03m/229-9. 2004: 9th at Olympic Trials (63.35m/207-10)...6th at NCAA Outdoors (63.51m/208-4)...Mountain West Outdoor champion...NACAC champion (63.83m/209-5)...ranked #10 in the U.S. by T&FN...best of (67.03m/219-11) 2003: Redshirt...best of 59.80m/196-2. 2002: Mountain West HT champ...21st at NCAA Outdoors (49.56m/162-7)...Mountain West DT champ...bests of 58.68m/192-6, 53.45m/175-4.

Her personal best throw is 70.64 metres, achieved in May 2009 in Tucson.

Year	Competition	Venue	Position	Notes
Representing the United States
2004	NACAC U-23 Championships	Sherbrooke, Canada	1st	63.83m
2008	Olympic Games	Beijing, PR China	39th	63.60 m
