= Michael Robertson (discus thrower) =

American discus thrower

Personal information
- Born: December 19, 1983 (age 42) Plantation, Florida, United States

Sport
- Sport: Track and field
- Club: Stanford Cardinals
Medal record
Representing United States
Pan American Games
Gold medal – first place	2007 Rio de Janeiro	Discus throw

Michael Robertson (born December 19, 1983) is a male athlete from the United States. He competes in the men's discus throw. Robertson set his personal best in the discus throw event (65.61 metres) in Denton, Texas on April 24, 2008.

Representing the Stanford Cardinal track and field team, Robertson won the 2005 NCAA Division I Outdoor Track and Field Championships in the discus. Before that, Robertson finished 3rd in the 2003 and 2004 NCAA Division I Outdoor Track and Field Championships for the SMU Mustangs track and field team.

Michael Robertson is currently an orthopedic surgeon practicing at Ortho Indy in Indianapolis, IN. Specializing in orthopedic trauma.

== Achievements ==
Year	Competition	Venue	Position	Notes
Representing the United States
2002	World Junior Championships	Kingston, Jamaica	20th (q)	53.58 m (1.75 kg)
2004	NACAC U-23 Championships	Sherbrooke, Canada	1st	58.57 m
2007	Pan American Games	Rio de Janeiro, Brazil	1st	59.24 m
2007	World Championships	Osaka, Japan	20th (q)	60.39 m
2008	Olympic Games	Beijing, PR China	16th (q)	61.64 m
