= Dan Taylor (shot putter) =

American shot putter

Daniel Taylor (born May 12, 1982) is an American shot putter. He is currently sponsored by Nike. He is currently competing around the world in track and field.

== High school ==
He attended Berkshire High School in Burton, Ohio, and was a letterman in football and track and field. In football, he garnered first team All-North East Ohio honors.

He was much more successful in track and field. In his sophomore year of high school he won the Division III state discus title with a throw of 167' 4". Taylor also holds the OHSAA Division III state discus record at 200' 11".

Taylor's best finish in the shot put in the state championship was 2nd in 1999, during this year Berkshire High School was a Division III school.

His personal best throw is 21.78 metres, achieved in May 2009 in Tucson.

== College ==
Taylor attended Ohio State University. He graduated in 2005 with a B.S. in agriculture. He majored in Construction Systems Management and minored in molecular microbiology and in City and Regional Planning. While at Ohio State University, He was a 2 time NCAA Champion, an 11 time NCAA All-American, and a 7 time Big Ten Champion.

== Achievements ==
- All results regarding shot put, unless stated otherwise

Year	Competition	Venue	Position	Event	Notes
Representing the United States
1999	World Youth Championships	Bydgoszcz, Poland	13th (q)	Shot put (5 kg)	17.58 m
1999	World Youth Championships	Bydgoszcz, Poland	5th	Discus (1.5 kg)	55.96 m
2003	Pan American Games	Santo Domingo, Dominican Republic	4th	Shot put	19.69 m
2004	NACAC U-23 Championships	Sherbrooke, Canada	2nd	Shot put	18.73 m
2004	NACAC U-23 Championships	Sherbrooke, Canada	2nd	Hammer	63.13 m
2006	World Athletics Final	Stuttgart, Germany	4th	Shot put	20.50 m
2009	World Championships	Berlin, Germany	26th	Shot put	19.39 m
