= Isa Phillips =

Jamaican hurdler

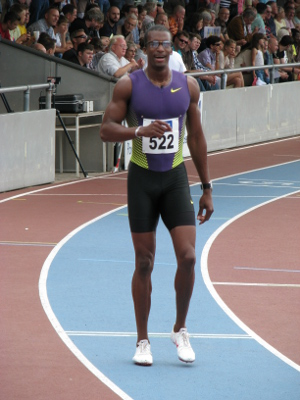
- Phillips at Mannheim DLV Competition 2011

Personal information
- Nationality: Jamaica
- Born: 22 April 1984 (age 42) Kingston, Jamaica
- Height: 1.93 m (6 ft 4 in)
- Weight: 84 kg (185 lb)

Sport
- Sport: Running
- Events: 400 metres, 400 metre hurdles
Medal record
Men's Athletics
Representing Jamaica
Pan American Games
Silver medal – second place	2011 Guadalajara	400 m hurdles
Central American and Caribbean Championships
Gold medal – first place	2008 Cali	400m hurdles
Pan American Junior Championships
Silver medal – second place	2003 Bridgetown	400 m hurdles
Bronze medal – third place	2003 Bridgetown	4×400 m relay
CARIFTA Games Junior (U20)
Gold medal – first place	2003 Port of Spain	4x400 m relay
Silver medal – second place	2003 Port of Spain	400 m hurdles
- Updated on 23 January 2015

Isa Phillips (born 22 April 1984) is a Jamaican hurdling athlete who specialises in the 400 metres hurdles.

The Kingston native made his international debut at the 2001 World Youth Championships in Athletics, finishing sixth in the 400 m hurdles semi-finals. He won the national under-18s championship in the event in 2001. Phillips took to the senior circuit in 2003 and broke the 50-second-barrier in 2005, setting a personal best of 49.96 seconds in Arlington, Texas.

His first major competition was the 2007 World Championships in Athletics where he finished fourth in the heats. The following year he represented Jamaica at the 2008 Summer Olympics and reached the semi-finals of the 400 m hurdles. He closed the season with a bronze medal win at the 2008 World Athletics Final, finishing behind compatriot Danny McFarlane and American Kerron Clement.

He lowered his personal best to 48.36 seconds at the Grande Prêmio Brasil Caixa meet in May 2009, making him the sixth fastest Jamaican in the event. He again improved at the Jamaican national championships, qualifying for the 2009 World Championships with a world-leading time of 48.05 s; Winthrop Graham and Danny McFarlane were the only Jamaicans who had faster times.

Phillips ran track collegiately at Louisiana State University.

== Personal bests ==
Event	Time (seconds)	Venue	Date
200 metres	21.05 (wind: +0.6 m/s)	Baton Rouge, United States	18 April 2009
400 metres hurdles	48.05	Kingston, Jamaica	27 June 2009
800 metres (indoor)	1:52.17	Albuquerque, United States	21 January 2006

- All information taken from IAAF profile.

== Competition record ==
Year	Competition	Venue	Position	Event	Notes
Representing Jamaica
2001	World Youth Championships	Debrecen, Hungary	13th (sf)	400m hurdles (84 cm)	54.03
2003	CARIFTA Games (U20)	Port of Spain, Trinidad and Tobago	2nd	400m hurdles	51.29
2003	CARIFTA Games (U20)	Port of Spain, Trinidad and Tobago	1st	4 × 400 m relay	3:09.70
2003	Pan American Junior Championships	Bridgetown, Barbados	2nd	400m hurdles	50.95
2003	Pan American Junior Championships	Bridgetown, Barbados	3rd	4 × 400 m relay	3:12.41
2004	NACAC Under-23 Championships	Sherbrooke, Canada	5th	400m hurdles	51.00
2004	NACAC Under-23 Championships	Sherbrooke, Canada	2nd	4 × 400 m relay	3:05.79
2006	NACAC Under-23 Championships	Santo Domingo, Dominican Republic	3rd	400m hurdles	49.80
2007	World Championships	Osaka, Japan	16th (sf)	400m hurdles	49.47
2008	Central American and Caribbean Championships	Cali, Colombia	1st	400m hurdles	49.98 A
2008	Olympic Games	Beijing, China	9th (sf)	400m hurdles	48.85
2008	World Athletics Final	Stuttgart, Germany	3rd	400m hurdles	49.22
2009	World Championships	Berlin, Germany	10th (sf)	400m hurdles	48.93
2009	World Championships	Berlin, Germany	11th (h)	4 × 400 m relay	3:04.45
2009	World Athletics Final	Thessaloniki, Greece	—	400m hurdles	DQ
2011	World Championships	Daegu, South Korea	10th (sf)	400m hurdles	49.16
2011	Pan American Games	Guadalajara, Mexico	2nd	400m hurdles	48.82 A
2013	Central American and Caribbean Championships	Morelia, Mexico	7th	400m hurdles	51.24 A
2013	World Championships	Moscow, Russia	13th (sf)	400m hurdles	49.28
2014	Pan American Sports Festival	Mexico City, Mexico	4th	400m hurdles	50.42 A
