= Wallace Spearmon =

American sprinter (born 1984)

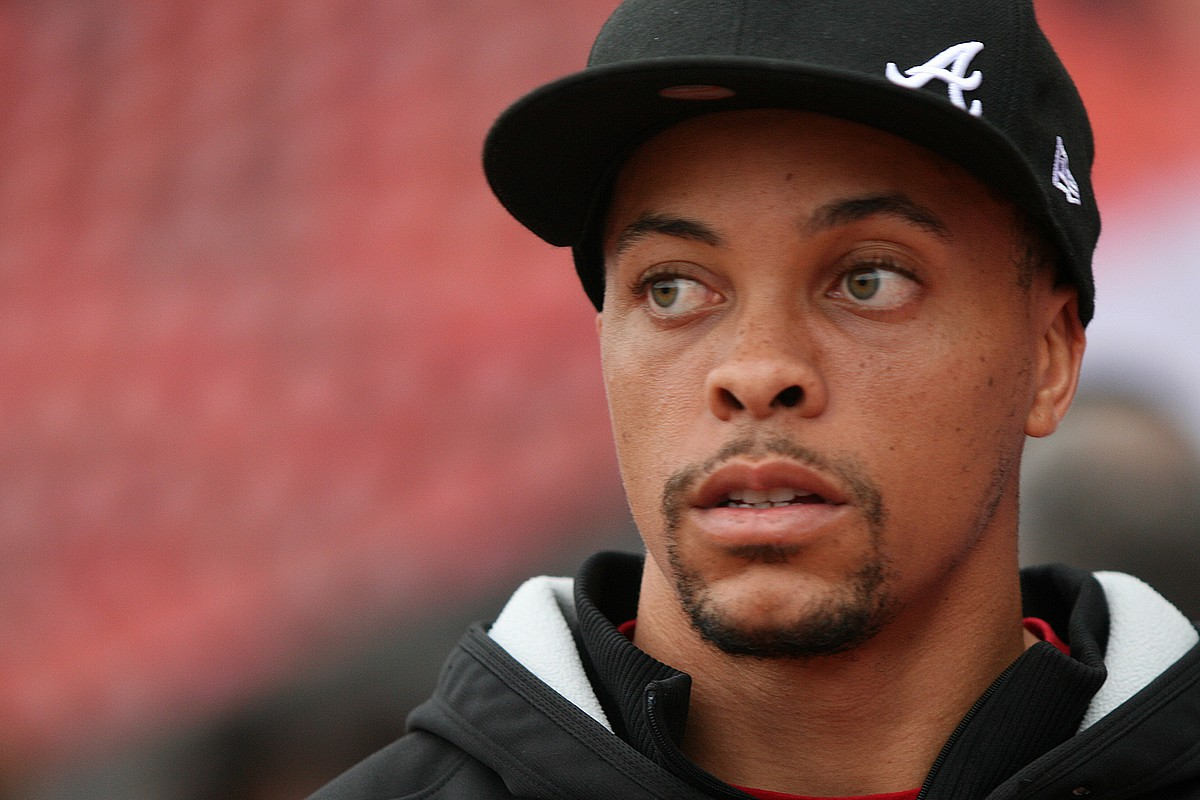
- Spearmon at 2010 Weltklasse Zürich

Personal information
- Full name: Wallace Spearmon Jr.
- Born: December 24, 1984 (age 41) Chicago, Illinois, U.S.
- Height: 6 ft 2 in (188 cm)
- Weight: 190 lb (86 kg)

Sport
- Sport: Running
- Events: 100 meters, 200 meters
Medal record
Men's athletics
Representing the United States
World Championships
| Gold medal – first place | 2007 Osaka | 4 × 100 m relay |
| Silver medal – second place | 2005 Helsinki | 200 m |
| Bronze medal – third place | 2007 Osaka | 200 m |
| Bronze medal – third place | 2009 Berlin | 200 m |
Pan American Games
| Gold medal – first place | 2015 Toronto | 4 × 100 m |
World Indoor Championships
| Gold medal – first place | 2006 Moscow | 4 × 400 m relay |
NACAC Under-23 Championships in Athletics
| Gold medal – first place | 2004 Sherbrooke | 200 m |
| Gold medal – first place | 2004 Sherbrooke | 4 × 100 m relay |
Representing Americas
Continental Cup
| Gold medal – first place | 2006 Athens | 200 m |
| Gold medal – first place | 2006 Athens | 4 × 100 m relay |
| Gold medal – first place | 2010 Split | 200 m |
| Gold medal – first place | 2010 Split | 4 × 100 m relay |

Wallace Spearmon Jr. (born December 24, 1984) is an American retired sprint athlete who specialized in the 200 meters. He is a two-time NCAA outdoor champion in the 200 m and won the silver medal in the event at the 2005 World Championships in Athletics. He has a personal best of 19.65 seconds for the distance, making him the fifteenth fastest 200 meter runner of all time, and he formerly held the indoor American record.

He won the bronze medal twice at the World Championships in Athletics in 2007 and 2009. He also finished third at the 2008 Summer Olympics, but was later disqualified for stepping out of his lane.

== Career ==
Spearmon is a graduate of Fayetteville High School and attended the University of Arkansas, where he competed collegiately for two seasons before turning pro. While at Arkansas, he won the 200 meters NCAA Outdoor title in 2004 and 2005 as well as the NCAA Indoor 200 m title in 2005. In August 2005, he won the silver medal in the 200 m at the 2005 World Championships and in August 2007, he won the bronze medal at the 2007 World Championships. Spearmon won the 200 m at the USA outdoor athletics championships in 2006 and finished second in 2007. At the 2009 World Championships in Berlin he won another bronze. He ran a world best time of 31.88 for the 300 m indoors in February 2006.

His personal best in the 200 m is 19.65 seconds. This time (achieved in Daegu, South Korea) made him the third fastest man over the distance at that point. He is currently ranked as the fifteenth fastest 200-meter runner ever. Only world record holder Usain Bolt (19.19), Yohan Blake (19.26), Noah Lyles (19.31), Michael Johnson (19.32), Letsile Tebogo (19.46), Erriyon Knighton (19.49), Walter Dix (19.53), Justin Gatlin (19.57), Kenny Bednarek (19.57), his training partner Tyson Gay (19.58), Andre de Grasse (19.62), Xavier Carter (19.63), Reynier Mena (19.63), and Bryan Levell (19.64) have run faster. Despite typically running a slower first half of his 200 m races, his 100 meters personal best is 9.96 s. He set that mark running in Shanghai on September 28, 2007, beating 100 m world champion Tyson Gay.

Spearmon initially finished in the bronze medal position in the 200 m in the 2008 Summer Olympics in Beijing, but was disqualified for stepping out of his lane. The second-place finisher, Churandy Martina of the Netherlands Antilles, was also disqualified, giving Americans Shawn Crawford and Walter Dix the silver and bronze medals, respectively.

He posted a time of 19.98 seconds in the 200 m in Kingston, Jamaica in April 2010, finishing behind Usain Bolt. He reached the 2010 IAAF Diamond League 200 m final at the Weltklasse Zurich meeting, and (in the absence of points leader Walter Dix) he won the first Diamond Race Trophy with a meeting record of 19.79 seconds. Following the Diamond League win, he ran 19.85 seconds to win at the Rieti IAAF Grand Prix.

At the start of the 2012 season, he broke Michael Johnson's 200 m meet record at the Drake Relays with a run of 20.02 seconds. He finished fourth in the 200 metres final at the 2012 London Olympics. His time of 19.90 seconds was 6/100 of a second outside of a medal placing.

Spearmon finished 21st at the 2013 World Championships, running a time of 20.66 seconds in the semi-final .

At a meeting in Edmonton in July, 2014, Spearmon tested positive for methylprednisolone contained in a medicine he was taking without asking for an exemption. USADA accepted the excuse so it was treated as a minor violation. On September 19, 2014, it was announced he would receive a 3-month suspension, backdated to August 27.

Spearmon attended the 2015 World Championships, but did not start his heat.

== Personal life ==
Spearmon's father, Wallace Spearmon Sr., was also a sprinter. He was the 1987 bronze medalist in the 200 meters at the Pan American Games.

He has spoken publicly about his friendship with fellow sprinter Usain Bolt.

On an April 2011 episode of MythBusters, he worked with Adam Savage and Jamie Hyneman to investigate the possibility of a human running on water. In May 2013 he returned to the show to race 30 ft against a race car.

== Personal bests ==
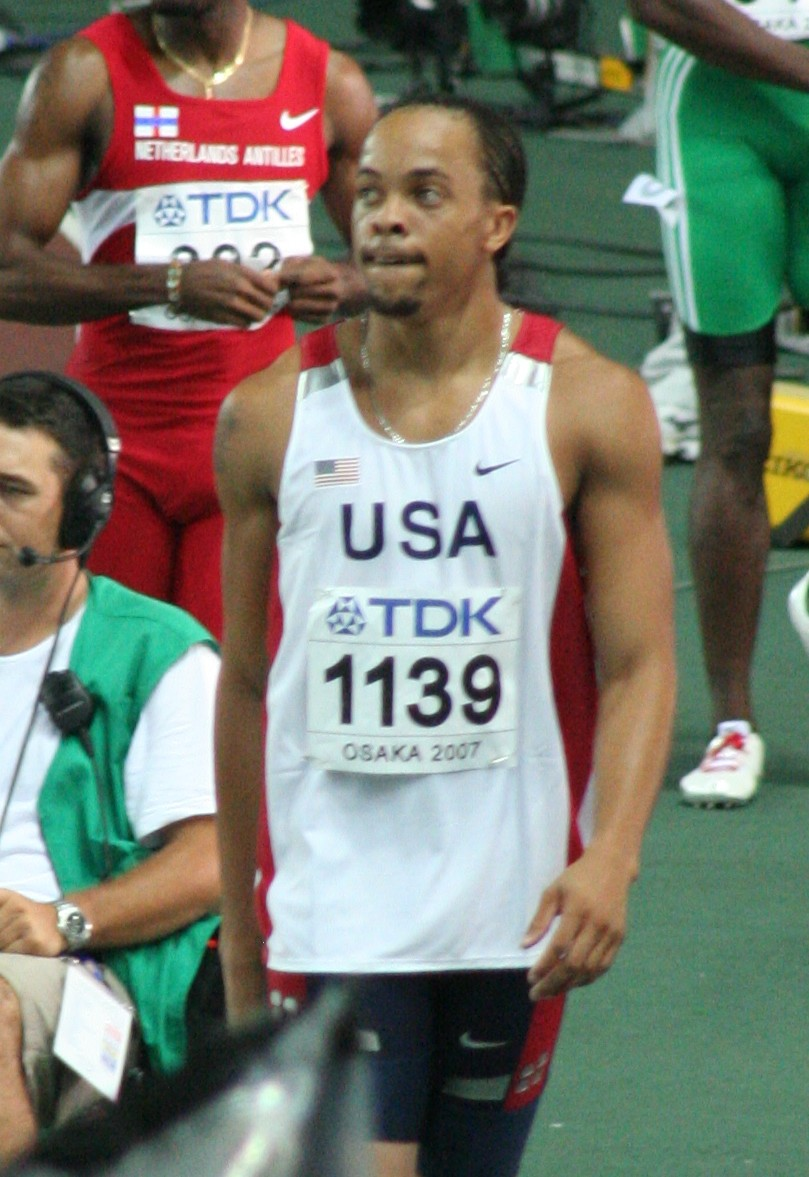
Spearmon at the 2007 World Championships

| Event | Time (sec) | Venue | Date |
|---|---|---|---|
| 60 meters | 6.66 | Fayetteville, United States | February 11, 2012 |
| 100 meters | 9.96 | Shanghai, China | September 28, 2007 |
| 200 meters | 19.65 | Daegu, South Korea | September 28, 2006 |
| 200 meters (indoors) | 20.10 World U-23 Record | Fayetteville, United States | March 11, 2005 |
| 300 meters (indoors) | 31.88 Former WR | Fayetteville, United States | February 10, 2006 |
| 400 meters | 45.22 | Paris, France | July 8, 2006 |

- All information taken from IAAF profile.

As of August 2024, Spearmon holds four track records for 200 metres including Arlington, United States (19.95, March 2012), Carson (19.91, May 2007), Rieti, Italy (19.85, August 2010) and Split, Croatia (19.95, September 2010).

Achievements
| Preceded by (United States) Shawn Crawford | Men's 200 m Best Year Performance; 2005 | Succeeded by (United States) Xavier Carter |
