= Moya Thompson =

Jamaican athlete

Moya Thompson (born 21 August 1982) is a Jamaican sprinter who specialized in the 400 metres. She is also known as a relay runner, winning a gold medal at the 2005 Central American and Caribbean Championships and setting a world best performance in the sprint medley relay.

== Career ==
From 2002 to 2005, Thompson competed collegiately for the Lincoln Blue Tigers. She won the individual 400 metres title at the NCAA Division II women's indoor track and field championships in 2005 and took the individual silver in 2004. At the NCAA Division II women's outdoor track and field championships, she won back-to-back gold medals in 2003 and 2004 (and finished fourth in the 200 metres both times). She was selected by the USTFCCCA to the NCAA Division II Athlete Hall of Fame in 2023.

She finished fourth at the 2004 NACAC U23 Championships and sixth at the 2005 Central American and Caribbean Championships. At the 2005 CACC, she also won a gold medal in the 4 × 400 metres relay.

She was selected for the relay team at the 2006 World Indoor Championships, finishing fifth, and competed individually at the 2008 World Indoor Championships without reaching the final. After finishing eighth in the Jamaican championships that summer, she was selected for the 2008 Central American and Caribbean Championships where she raced without reaching the final.

At the 2009 Penn Relays, she participated on a Jamaican team in the rarely contested sprint medley relay (200, 200, 400, 800). With Thompson unning the 400 metre leg, the team set a world best performance with 3:34.56 minutes. She also finished fifth at the 2009 Jamaican championships.

Her lifetime best result was 51.47 seconds, achieved in May 2006 in Atlanta, and later equalled during the semi-final of the 2008 Jamaican championships in Kingston.
