= Cristian Patiño =

Argentine footballer

Personal information
- Full name: Cristian Fabian Patino
- Date of birth: 3 July 1980 (age 45)
- Place of birth: Argentina
- Position: Defender

Senior career*
Years	Team	Apps	(Gls)
	Monaco	0	(0)
2001	Unión de Santa Fe	0	(0)
2002–2004	Raith Rovers	49	(3)
2008	Algeciras		
- * Club domestic league appearances and goals

Cristian Patino (born 3 July 1980) is an Argentine former professional footballer who played as a defender.

== Career ==
Patino started his senior career with Monaco. In 2002, he signed for Raith Rovers in the Scottish Championship, where he made forty-nine appearances and scored three goals. After that, he played for Spanish club Algeciras before retiring.
