= Wes Felix =

American sprinter and sports agent (born 1983)

Personal information
- Nationality: American
- Born: July 21, 1983 (age 42) Los Angeles, California
- Height: 6 ft 0 in (1.83 m)
- Weight: 160 lb (73 kg)

Sport
- Sport: Running
- Event(s): 100 metres, 200 metres

Achievements and titles
- Personal best(s): 100m: 10.23 s (Los Angeles 2005); 200m: 20.43 s (Tucson 2004)
Medal record
Representing United States
Men's athletics
NACAC Under-23 Championships in Athletics
| Gold medal – first place | 2004 Sherbrooke | 4×100 m relay |
World Junior Championships
| Gold medal – first place | 2002 Kingston | 4×100 m relay |
| Bronze medal – third place | 2002 Kingston | 200 m |

Paul Wesley Felix (born July 21, 1983) is an American sprinter who specialises in the 100 and 200 metres. He attended the University of Southern California from 2002 to 2005, where he was the Pac-10 200 metres champion in 2003 and 2004. He was also the Pac 10 champion in the 100m in 2005 in the time of 10.24 (wind: -0.1 m/s).

He was an All-American sprinter for the USC Trojans track and field team, finishing runner-up in the 100 m at the 2005 NCAA Division I Outdoor Track and Field Championships.

Felix is the older brother of Olympic medalist Allyson Felix and the agent for his sister.

== Personal best ==
| Distance | Time | venue |
|---|---|---|
| 100m | 10.23 s | Los Angeles, California (April 30, 2004) |
| 200m | 20.43 s | Tucson, Arizona (May 15, 2004) |
