= Athletics at the 2007 Pan American Games =

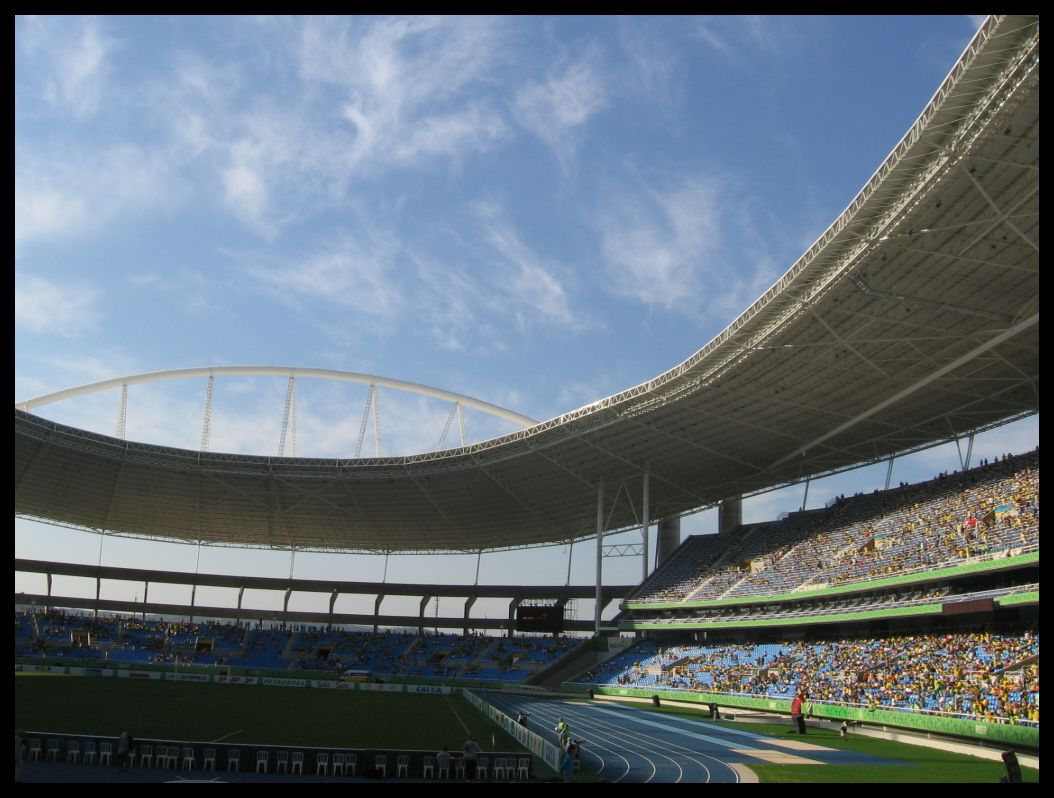
- The main stadium during the 2007 Games
- Dates: 22 – 29 July
- Host city: Rio de Janeiro, Brazil
- Venue: Estádio Olímpico João Havelange; Flamengo Park
- Level: Senior
- Events: 47
- Participation: 627 athletes from 41 nations
- Records set: 13 Games records

The athletics competition at the 2007 Pan American Games was held at the Flamengo Park and Estádio Olímpico João Havelange in Rio de Janeiro between 22 July and 29 July 2007. In the 47 events that took place, thirteen Games records in athletics were equalled or beaten at the 2007 edition.

Cuba fielded its best athletes and easily topped the medal table, winning twelve gold medals and also having the greatest medal haul overall with a total of 30. The hosts, Brazil, took second place on the table having won nine golds and 23 medals overall. The United States – continuing its tradition of fielding a far from full strength squad – had its worst performance ever in the Pan American athletics competition. With six golds for third place, it finished outside the top two for the first time in Games history (although its medal total of 24 was one greater than second-placed Brazil). Canada and Mexico were the next most successful nations, placing fourth and fifth in the medal tally, respectively.

== Medal summary ==
Key:
^{WR} World record	^{AR} Area record	^{GR} Games record	^{NR} National record	^{PB} Athlete's personal best

=== Men's events ===
Event	Gold		Silver		Bronze	
100 metres	Churandy Martina; Netherlands Antilles	10.15	Darvis Patton; United States	10.17	Brendan Christian; Antigua and Barbuda	10.26
200 metres	Brendan Christian; Antigua and Barbuda	20.37	Marvin Anderson; Jamaica	20.38	Rubin Williams; United States	20.57
400 metres	Chris Brown; Bahamas	44.85	Tyler Christopher; Canada	45.05	Chris Lloyd; Dominica	45.40
800 metres	Yeimer López; Cuba	1:44.58 GR PB	Kléberson Davide; Brazil	1:45.47	Fabiano Peçanha; Brazil	1:45.54
1500 metres	Hudson de Souza; Brazil	3:36.32 GR PB	Juan Barrios; Mexico	3:37.71	Byron Piedra; Ecuador	3:37.88 NR
5000 metres	Ed Moran; United States	13:25.60 GR PB	Juan Barrios; Mexico	13:29.87	Marílson Gomes dos Santos; Brazil	13:30.87
10,000 metres	José David Galván; Mexico	28:08.74 GR PB	Marílson Gomes dos Santos; Brazil	28:09.30	Alejandro Suárez; Mexico	28:09.95
Marathon	Franck de Almeida; Brazil	2:14:03	José Amado García; Guatemala	2:14:27	Procopio Franco; Mexico	2:15:18
3000 metres steeplechase	Joshua McAdams; United States	8:30.49	Michael Spence; United States	8:32.11	José Alberto Sánchez; Cuba	8:36.07
110 metres hurdles	Dayron Robles; Cuba	13.25	David Payne; United States	13.43	Yoel Hernández; Cuba	13.50
400 metres hurdles	Adam Kunkel; Canada	48.24	Bayano Kamani; Panama	48.70	LaRon Bennett; United States	49.07
4 × 100 m relay	Brazil; Vicente Lenilson, Rafael Ribeiro, Basílio de Moraes, Sandro Viana	38.81	Canada; Richard Adu-Bobie, Anson Henry, Jared Connaughton, Bryan Barnett	38.87	United States; J-Mee Samuels, Rae Edwards, Rubin Williams, Darvis Patton	38.88
4 × 400 m relay	Bahamas; Andrae Williams, Avard Moncur, Michael Mathieu, Chris Brown	3:01.94	United States; Greg Nixon, Jamaal Torrance, LaRon Bennett, David Neville	3:02.44	Dominican Republic; Carlos Santa; Arismendy Peguero; Yoel Tapia; Félix Sánchez	3:02.48
20 km race walk	Jefferson Pérez; Ecuador	1:22:08	Rolando Saquipay; Ecuador	1:23:28	Gustavo Restrepo; Colombia	1:24:51
50 km race walk	Xavier Moreno; Ecuador	3:52:07	Horacio Nava; Mexico	3:52:35	Omar Zepeda; Mexico	3:56:04
High jump	Víctor Moya; Cuba	2.32 m	Donald Thomas; Bahamas	2.30 m	James Grayman; Antigua and Barbuda	2.24 m
Pole vault	Fábio Gomes da Silva; Brazil	5.40 m	Giovanni Lanaro; Mexico	5.30 m	Germán Chiaraviglio; Argentina	5.20 m
Long jump	Irving Saladino; Panama	8.28 m	Wilfredo Martínez; Cuba	7.92 m	Bashir Ramzy; United States	7.90 m
Triple jump	Jadel Gregório; Brazil	17.27 m	Osniel Tosca; Cuba	16.92 m	Yoandri Betanzos; Cuba	16.90 m
Shot put	Dylan Armstrong; Canada	20.10 m	Dorian Scott; Jamaica	20.06 m	Carlos Véliz; Cuba	19.75 m
Discus throw	Michael Robertson; United States	59.24 m	Adam Kuehl; United States	57.50 m	Dariusz Slowik; Canada	57.37 m
Hammer throw	James Steacy; Canada	73.77 m	Kibwe Johnson; United States	73.23 m	Juan Ignacio Cerra; Argentina	72.12 m
Javelin throw	Guillermo Martínez; Cuba	77.66 m	Mike Hazle; United States	75.33 m	Alexon Maximiano; Brazil	75.04 m
Decathlon	Maurice Smith; Jamaica	8278 GR PB	Yordanis García; Cuba	8113	Carlos Chinin; Brazil	7977

=== Women's events ===
Event	Gold		Silver		Bronze	
100 metres	Mikele Barber; United States	11.02 GR PB	Mechelle Lewis; United States	11.24	Chandra Sturrup; Bahamas	11.29
200 metres	Roxana Díaz; Cuba	22.90	Sheri-Ann Brooks; Jamaica	22.92	Sherry Fletcher; Grenada	22.96
400 metres	Ana Guevara; Mexico	50.34	Christine Amertil; Bahamas	50.99	Indira Terrero; Cuba	51.09
800 metres	Diane Cummins; Canada	1:59.75	Rosibel García; Colombia	2:00.02	Zulia Calatayud; Cuba	2:00.34
1500 metres	Juliana Paula dos Santos; Brazil	4:13.36	Mary Jayne Harrelson; United States	4:15.24	Rosibel García; Colombia	4:15.78 (NR)
5000 metres	Megan Metcalfe; Canada	15:35.78	Catherine Ferrell; United States	15:42.01	Leticia Rocha de la Cruz; Mexico	15:43.80
10,000 metres	Sara Slattery; United States	32:54.11 GR PB	Maria Rodriguez de la Cruz; Mexico	32:56.75	Lucélia Peres; Brazil	33:19.48
Marathon	Mariela González; Cuba	2:43:11	Márcia Narloch; Brazil	2:45:10	Sirlene Pinho; Brazil	2:47:36
3000 metres steeplechase	Sabine Heitling; Brazil	9:51.13 GR PB	Talis Apud; Mexico	9:55.43 (NR)	Zenaide Vieira; Brazil	9:55.71
100 metres hurdles	Delloreen Ennis-London; Jamaica	12.65 GR PB	Perdita Felicien; Canada	12.65 GR	Angela Whyte; Canada	12.72
400 metres hurdles	Sheena Johnson; United States	54.64	Nickiesha Wilson; Jamaica	54.91	Nicole Leach; United States	54.97
4 × 100 m relay	Jamaica; Sheri-Ann Brooks; Tracy-Ann Rowe; Aleen Bailey; Peta-Gaye Dowdie	43.58	United States; Shareese Woods; Mechelle Lewis; Alexis Weatherspoon; Mikele Barber	43.62	Cuba; Virgen Benavides; Roxana Díaz; Misleidys Lazo; Anay Tejeda	43.80
4 × 400 m relay	Cuba; Aymée Martínez; Daimy Pernia; Zulia Calatayud; Indira Terrero	3:27.51	Mexico; Maria Teresa Rugerio; Gabriela E. Medina; Zudykey Rodriguez; Ana Guevara	3:27.75	United States; Debbie Dunn; Angel Perkins; Latonia Wilson; Nicole Leach	3:27.84
20 km race walk	Cristina Lopez; El Salvador	1:38:59	Miriam Ramón; Ecuador	1:40:03	Maria Sanchez; Mexico	1:41:47
High jump	Romary Rifka; Mexico	1.95 m PB	Nicole Forrester; Canada	1.95 m	Levern Spencer; Saint Lucia	1.87 m
Pole vault	Fabiana Murer; Brazil	4.60 m GR PB	April Steiner; United States	4.40 m	Yarisley Garcia; Cuba	4.30 m
Long jump	Maurren Higa Maggi; Brazil	6.84 m	Keila Costa; Brazil	6.73 m	Yargelis Savigne; Cuba	6.66 m
Triple jump	Yargelis Savigne; Cuba	14.80 m GR PB	Keila Costa; Brazil	14.38 m	Mabel Gay; Cuba	14.26 m
Shot put	Misleydis González; Cuba	18.83 m	Yumileidi Cumbá; Cuba	18.28 m	Cleopatra Borel-Brown; Trinidad and Tobago	18.22 m
Discus throw	Yarelis Barrios; Cuba	61.72 m	Yania Ferrales; Cuba	61.71 m	Elisângela Adriano; Brazil	60.27 m
Hammer throw	Yipsi Moreno; Cuba	75.20 m GR PB	Arasay Thondike; Cuba	68.70 m	Jennifer Dahlgren; Argentina	68.37 m
Javelin throw	Osleidys Menéndez; Cuba	62.34 m	Sonia Bisset; Cuba	60.68 m	Laverne Eve; Bahamas	58.10 m
Heptathlon	Jessica Zelinka; Canada	6136	Gretchen Quintana; Cuba	6000	Lucimara da Silva; Brazil	5873

== Medal table ==
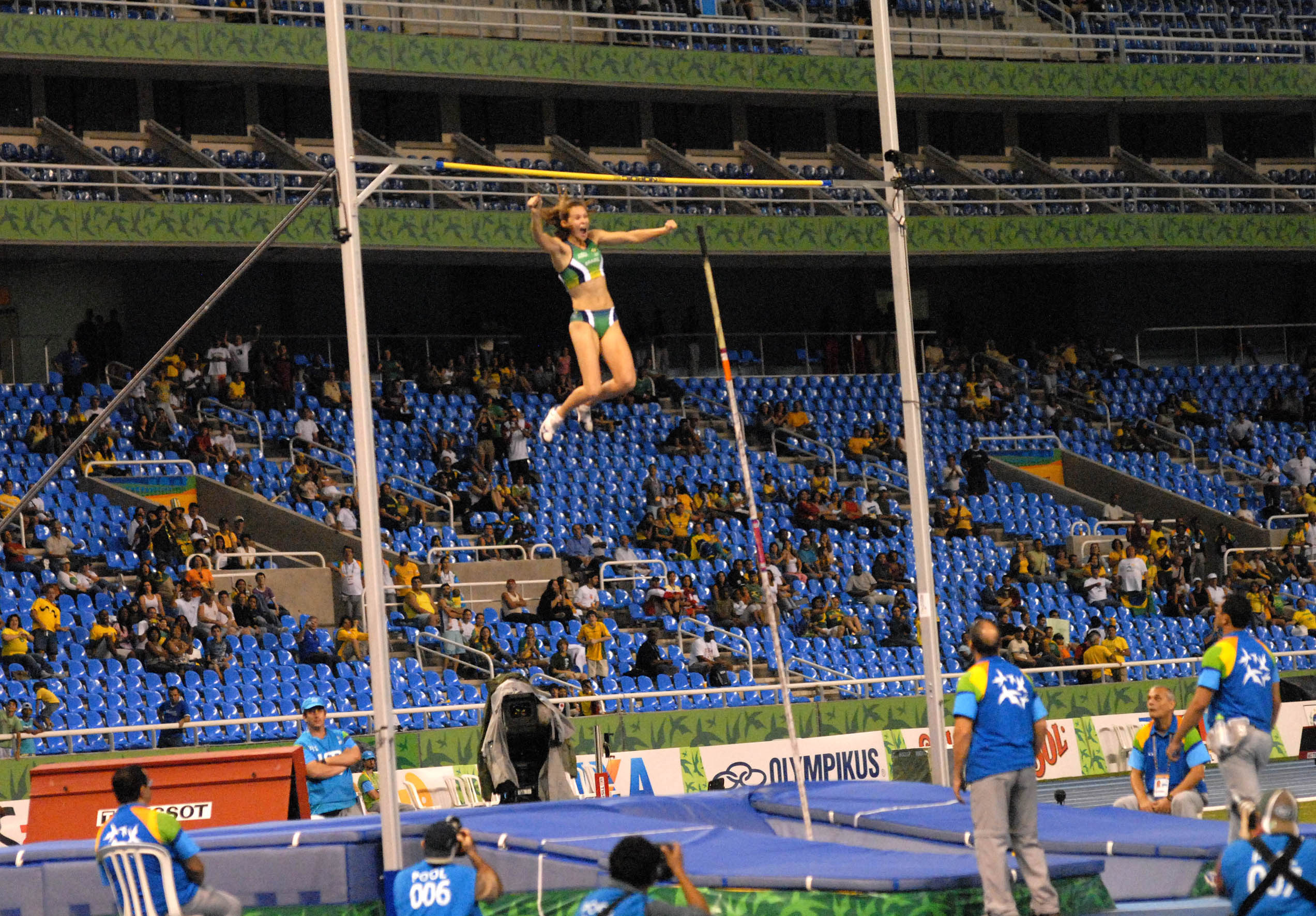
Fabiana Murer en route to a pole vault Games record

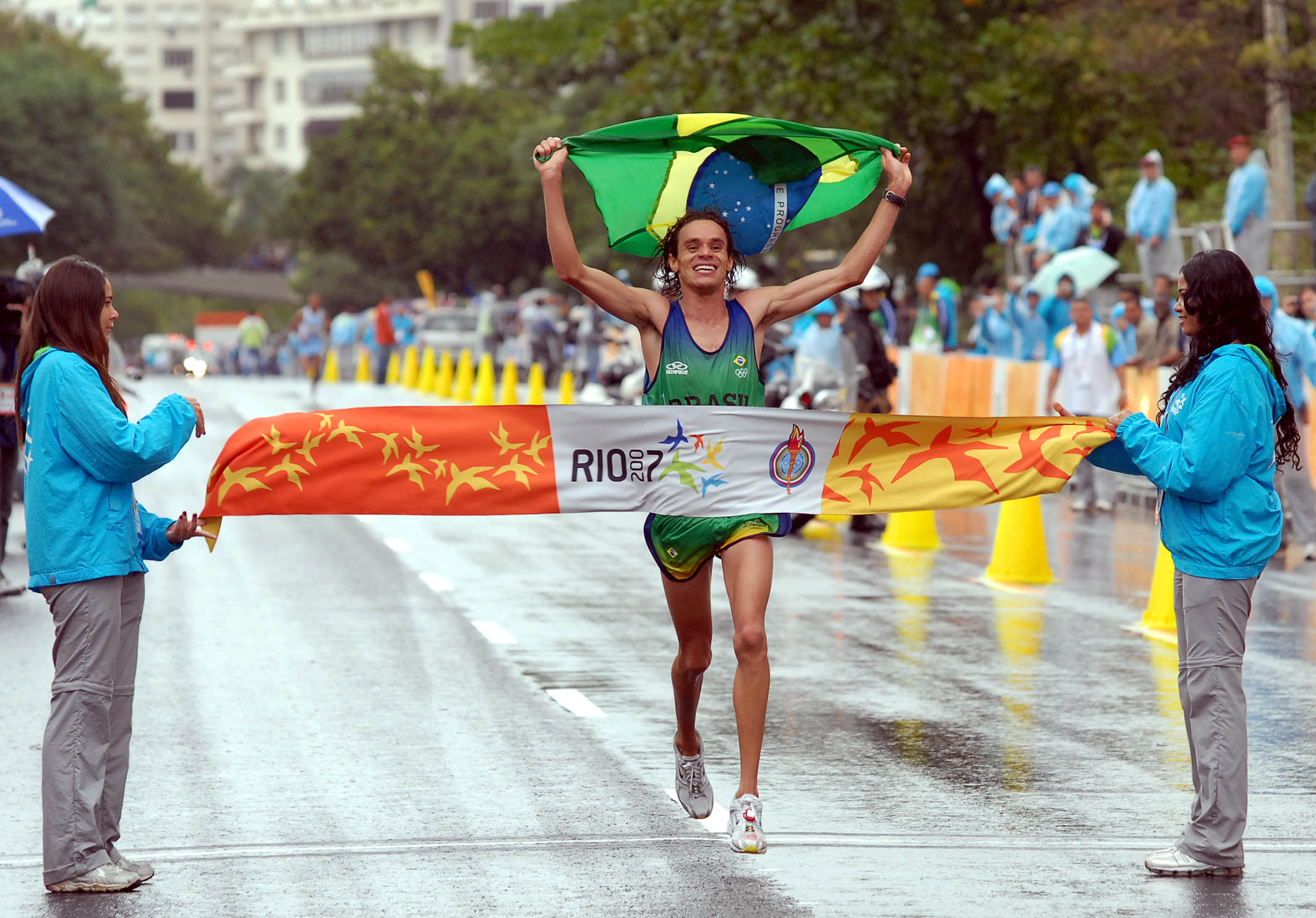
Franck de Almeida winning the men's marathon for Brazil

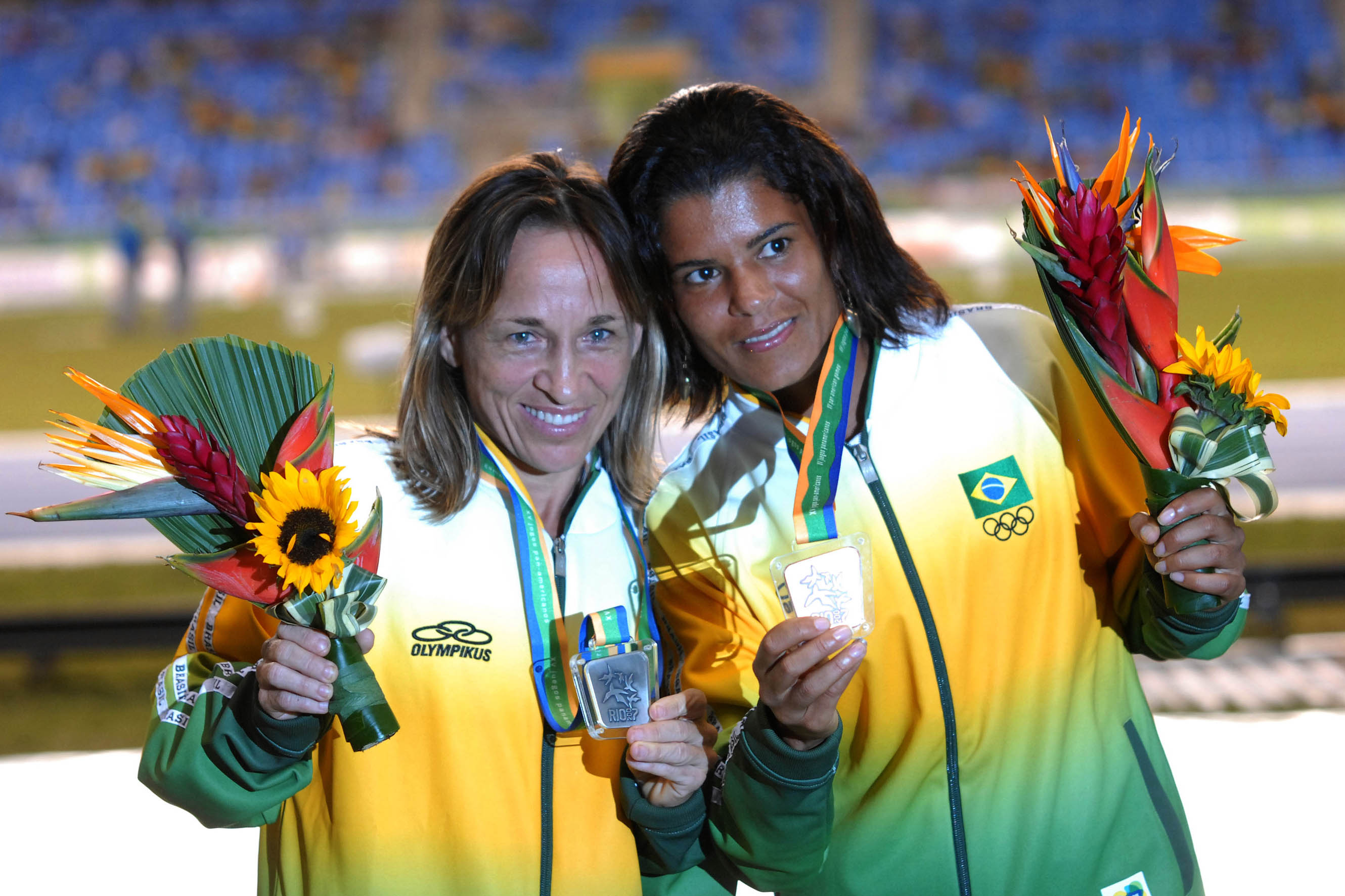
Márcia Narloch and Sirlene Pinho with their marathon medals

* Host nation (Brazil)

Rank	Nation	Gold	Silver	Bronze	Total
1	Cuba	12	8	10	30
2	Brazil*	9	5	9	23
3	United States	6	12	6	24
4	Canada	6	4	2	12
5	Mexico	3	7	5	15
6	Jamaica	3	4	0	7
7	Bahamas	2	2	2	6
8	Ecuador	2	2	1	5
9	Panama	1	1	0	2
10	Antigua and Barbuda	1	0	2	3
11	El Salvador	1	0	0	1
11	Netherlands Antilles	1	0	0	1
13	Colombia	0	1	2	3
14	Guatemala	0	1	0	1
15	Argentina	0	0	3	3
16	Dominica	0	0	1	1
16	Dominican Republic	0	0	1	1
16	Grenada	0	0	1	1
16	Saint Lucia	0	0	1	1
16	Trinidad and Tobago	0	0	1	1
Totals (20 entries)		47	47	47	141

== Participating nations ==
- Antigua and Barbuda (5)
- Argentina (22)
- Bahamas (23)
- Barbados (11)
- Belize (6)
- Bermuda (3)
- Bolivia (5)
- Brazil (81)
- British Virgin Islands (5)
- Canada (26)
- Cayman Islands (3)
- Chile (23)
- Colombia (24)
- Costa Rica (3)
- Cuba (51)
- Dominica (3)
- Dominican Republic (13)
- Ecuador (15)
- Grenada (4)
- Guatemala (12)
- Guyana (4)
- Haiti (11)
- Honduras (6)
- Jamaica (39)
- Mexico (26)
- Netherlands Antilles (4)
- Nicaragua (3)
- Panama (4)
- Paraguay (3)
- Peru (12)
- Puerto Rico (19)
- Saint Kitts and Nevis (17)
- Saint Lucia (4)
- Saint Vincent and the Grenadines (5)
- El Salvador (5)
- Suriname (2)
- Trinidad and Tobago (29)
- United States (81)
- United States Virgin Islands (3)
- Uruguay (4)
- Venezuela (8)

== See also ==
- 2007 in athletics (track and field)
- Athletics at the 2007 Parapan American Games
