= Dayana Octavien =

Haitian-American track and field athlete

Personal information
- Born: June 10, 1982 (age 43)

Sport
- Sport: Track and field
- Club: South Florida Bulls

Dayana Octavien (born June 10, 1982) is a Haitian-American track and field athlete who competes internationally for Haiti.

Octavien was selected for the Haitian discus throw team in the 2008 Summer Olympics, though she did not actually compete at the Games. She placed sixth the year prior in the Pan American Games. While attending college at the University of South Florida, Octavien was a two-time All-American, won seven Conference USA titles in three events (discus, weight throw and hammer), and was named the C-USA Women's Track and Field Athlete of the Year in three straight seasons. After her time with the Bulls, she was inducted into the University of South Florida Athletic Hall of Fame in 2013.

Dayana is the older sister of former NFL player Steve Octavien.
