= Ginnie Crawford =

American track and field athlete

Medal record

Women's athletics

Representing United States

IAAF World Cup
Bronze medal – third place	2006 Athens	100 m hurdles

Virginia Crawford (née Powell; born September 7, 1983) is a retired American track and field athlete who specialises in the sprint hurdles. She now is a 4th grade teacher after retiring track and field.

She began her international track career at the 1999 World Youth Championships in Athletics, and she reached the final of the 100 meter hurdles competition. She won her first major medal at the 2006 IAAF World Cup, finishing in 12.90 seconds. She first competed in the IAAF World Championships in Athletics in 2005, and reached the final of the sprint hurdles competition at the 2007 and 2009 editions, finishing fifth and sixth respectively.

Powell is a two-time US national champion over the 100 meter hurdles, winning the title in 2006 and 2007. She was also a successful collegiate athlete, winning two NCAA Women's Outdoor Track and Field Championships while a student at the University of Southern California. At the 2006 NCAA meet, she finished the semi-finals in 12.55 seconds (breaking Gail Devers' collegiate record) and won the final the following day in 12.48 seconds, setting a world-leading time.

In 2006, she won the Honda Sports Award as the nation's best female collegiate track and field athlete.

In 2010, she married Shawn Crawford who is an olympic medalist for track and field.

== Personal bests ==
Event	Time (sec)	Venue	Date
55 metres hurdles	7.71	Los Angeles, California, United States	February 15, 2003
60 metres hurdles	7.84	Fayetteville, Arkansas, United States	March 10, 2006
100 metres hurdles	12.45	New York City, New York, United States	June 2, 2007
60 metres	7.21	Fayetteville, Arkansas, United States	March 10, 2006
100 metres	11.10	Eugene, Oregon, United States	May 14, 2006
200 metres	23.29	Los Angeles, California, United States	April 29, 2006

- All information taken from IAAF profile.
