= LaRon Bennett =

American sprinter and hurdler

Personal information
- Born: LaRon Bennett Jr. November 25, 1982 (age 43)

Sport
- Country: United States
- Sport: Athletics
- Event: Sprinting / Hurdling
Medal record
Pan American Games
Silver medal – second place	2007 Rio de Janeiro	4x400 m
Bronze medal – third place	2007 Rio de Janeiro	400 m hurdles

LaRon Bennett (born November 25, 1982) is an American former athlete who competed in sprints and hurdles.

A native of Brunswick, Georgia, Bennett attended Glynn Academy and the University of Georgia. He was a captain and three-time All-American on the University of Georgia's track team. His specialist event was the 400 meters hurdles.

Bennett won gold in the 400 meters hurdles at the 2007 NACAC Championships and bronze at the 2007 Pan American Games, where he was also a member of the silver medal-winning 4 x 400 meters relay team.

In 2008, Bennett qualified to compete in hurdles at the IAAF World Athletics Final in Stuttgart.

Bennett finished sixth in the 400 meters hurdles at the 2010 USA Track and Field Championships.
