= Jade Bailey (athlete) =

Barbadian sprinter (born 1983)

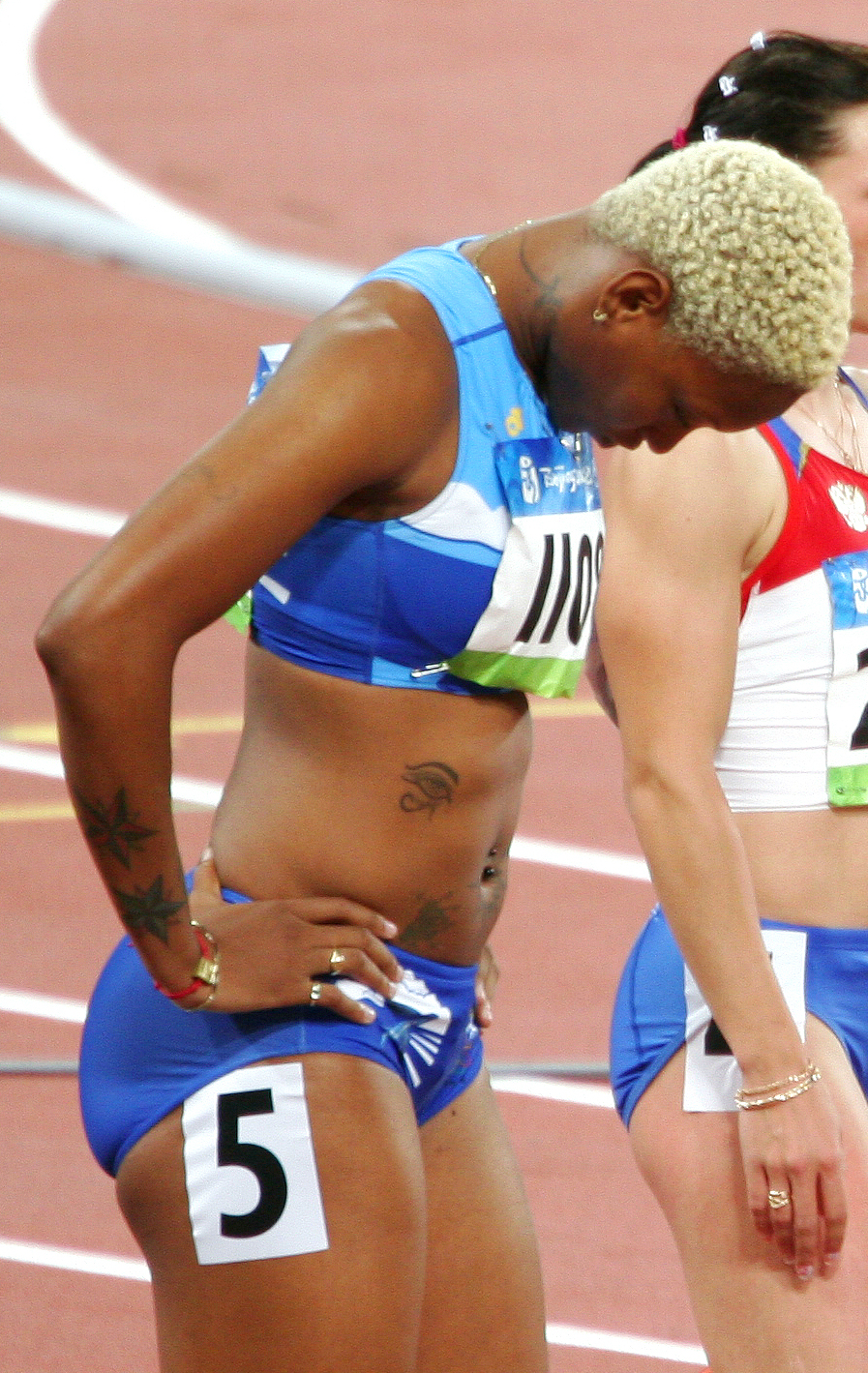
- Bailey at 2008 Summer Olympics

Personal information
- Born: June 10, 1983 (age 43)

Sport
- Sport: Track and field
Medal record
Representing Barbados
Central American and Caribbean Games
Bronze medal – third place	2006 Cartagena	200 m
CAC Junior Championships (U20)
Silver medal – second place	2002 Bridgetown	4x100 m relay
Bronze medal – third place	2002 Bridgetown	4x400 m relay
CARIFTA Games Youth (U17)
Gold medal – first place	1999 Fort-de-France	Javelin throw
Silver medal – second place	1998 Port of Spain	Javelin throw

Jade Latoya Bailey (born June 10, 1983) is a track and field sprint athlete who competes internationally for Barbados. Bailey lives in Barbados and is coached by Keith Thornhill.

She won the bronze medal in 200 metres at the 2006 Central American and Caribbean Games. Bailey has competed in several European meetings between 2007 & 2009.

Bailey represented Barbados at the 2008 Summer Olympics in Beijing. She competed at the 100 metres sprint and placed second in her first round heat after Yevgeniya Polyakova in a time of 11.24 seconds. She qualified for the second round but was eliminated not qualifying for the semi-finals as her time of 11.67 was the eighth time of her race. In 2009, she represented Barbados at the IAAF World Championships in the 200m event in which she holds the national record of 22.91 seconds.

She is a member of the Fenerbahçe S.K. athletics club in Turkey.
