= 2004 World Junior Championships in Athletics – Men's 4 × 400 metres relay =

The men's 4x400 metres relay event at the 2004 World Junior Championships in Athletics was held in Grosseto, Italy, at Stadio Olimpico Carlo Zecchini on 17 and 18 July.

== Medalists ==
Gold	Brandon Johnson; LaShawn Merritt; Jason Craig; Kerron Clement; United States
Silver	Wouter Le Roux; Chris Gebhardt; Leigh Julius; Louis van Zyl; South Africa
Bronze	Kazunori Ota; Hiroyuki Noda; Teppei Suzuki; Yudai Sasaki; Japan

== Results ==
=== Final ===
18 July

Rank	Nation	Competitors	Time	Notes
1st place, gold medalist(s)	United States	Brandon Johnson; LaShawn Merritt; Jason Craig; Kerron Clement	3:01.09	
2nd place, silver medalist(s)	South Africa	Wouter Le Roux; Chris Gebhardt; Leigh Julius; Louis van Zyl	3:04.50	
3rd place, bronze medalist(s)	Japan	Kazunori Ota; Hiroyuki Noda; Teppei Suzuki; Yudai Sasaki	3:05.33	
4	Brazil	Paulo Orlando; Felipe de Paula; Fernando de Almeida; Diego Venâncio	3:05.44	
5	Great Britain	Richard Buck; Ryan Dinham; Michael Rimmer; Richard Davenport	3:07.02	
6	Poland	Kamil Barański; Ziemowit Ryś; Damian Kempa; Łukasz Pryga	3:07.20	
7	Australia	Tim Rooke; Gavin Jeffries; Werner Botha; Sean Wroe	3:07.95	
8	Germany	Claas Caspers; Florian Schwalm; Falco Lausecker; Martin Grothkopp	3:08.83	

=== Heats ===
17 July

==== Heat 1 ====
Rank	Nation	Competitors	Time	Notes
1	Great Britain	Richard Buck; Ryan Dinham; Michael Rimmer; Richard Davenport	3:06.52	Q
2	Brazil	Paulo Orlando; Felipe de Paula; Fernando de Almeida; Diego Venâncio	3:06.55	Q
3	Germany	Florian Schwalm; Martin Grothkopp; Carlo Schaper; Claas Caspers	3:08.50	q
4	Puerto Rico	Christian Santiago; Marcos Sánchez-Valle; Leonardo Meléndez; Félix Martínez	3:12.18	
5	France	Benjamin Chevrol; Fadil Bellaabouss; Florent Joulain; Teddy Venel	3:12.80	
6	Russia	Maksim Vasilyev; Aleksandr Sigalovskiy; Dmitriy Gladyshev; Valentin Kruglyakov	3:17.30	

==== Heat 2 ====
Rank	Nation	Competitors	Time	Notes
1	United States	Keith Hinnant; Jason Craig; Anthony Ramirez; LaShawn Merritt	3:05.28	Q
2	Japan	Kazunori Ota; Hiroyuki Noda; Teppei Suzuki; Yudai Sasaki	3:06.72	Q
3	Bahamas	Andretti Bain; Jacobi Mitchell; Jamal Moss; Tyrone Sawyer	3:12.51	
4	Turkey	Tuncay Örs; Selahattin Çobanoğlu; Erkan Davut; Serdar Tamac	3:12.66	
5	New Zealand	Cory Innes; Nick Ash; Todd Mansfield; Jordan Vandermade	3:12.88	
	Jamaica	Leford Green; Josef Robertson; Morgan Carlington; Rohan Phipps	DQ	IAAF rule 170.13
	Uganda	Reuben Twijukye; Stephens Akena; Raymond Diogo; Wilson Lukungu Waiswa	DQ	IAAF rule 170.8

==== Heat 3 ====
Rank	Nation	Competitors	Time	Notes
1	South Africa	Ruaan Grobler; Chris Gebhardt; Leigh Julius; Louis van Zyl	3:06.29	Q
2	Australia	Tim Rooke; Gavin Jeffries; Ben Offereins; Sean Wroe	3:07.41	Q
3	Poland	Kamil Barański; Ziemowit Ryś; Łukasz Pryga; Damian Kempa	3:07.55	q
4	Croatia	Ivan Rimac; Igor Jankovic; Milan Kotur; Željko Vincek	3:10.04	
5	Italy	Teo Turchi; Massimilliano Quirico; Claudio Licciardello; Emanuele Magi	3:10.48	
6	Trinidad and Tobago	Jamil James; Marcus Duncan; Stann Waithe; Renny Quow	3:11.33	

== Participation ==
According to an unofficial count, 81 athletes from 19 countries participated in the event.

- Australia (5)
- Bahamas (4)
- Brazil (4)
- Croatia (4)
- France (4)
- Germany (5)
- Italy (4)
- Jamaica (4)
- Japan (4)
- New Zealand (4)
- Poland (4)
- Puerto Rico (4)
- Russia (4)
- South Africa (5)
- Trinidad and Tobago (4)
- Turkey (4)
- Uganda (4)
- United Kingdom (4)
- United States (6)
