= Josanne Lucas =

Personal information
- Born: May 14, 1984 (age 42) Carnbee, Tobago, Trinidad and Tobago
- Height: 1.62 m (5 ft 4 in)
- Weight: 56 kg (123 lb)

Sport
- Country: Trinidad and Tobago
- Sport: Athletics
- Event: Hurdling
Medal record
Representing Trinidad and Tobago
Women's athletics
World Championships
Bronze medal – third place	2009 Berlin	400 m hurdles
CAC Junior Championships (U17)
Silver medal – second place	2000 San Juan	300 m hurdles
Silver medal – second place	2000 San Juan	4x100 m relay
CARIFTA Games Junior (U20)
Silver medal – second place	2003 Port of Spain	4x400 m relay
Bronze medal – third place	2003 Port of Spain	400 m hurdles
- Updated on 3 January 2015

Josanne Lucille Lucas (born 14 May 1984) is a Trinidad and Tobago track and field athlete who specialises in the 400 metres hurdles.

Born in Carnbee, Trinidad and Tobago, Lucas' first success was a win at the national championships in the 400 metres in 2005, but she focused on hurdling instead. She competed at the 2005 World Championships in Athletics in the 400 m hurdles but failed to progress beyond the heats. Lucas represented Trinidad and Tobago at the 2008 Summer Olympics but again did not pass the heats.

She set a new national record of 55.24 seconds in Belém at the Grande Prêmio Brasil Caixa meet in May 2009.

She won the bronze in the 400m hurdles at the World Championships for Athletics in Berlin, Germany in 2009.

She studied at Auburn University under coach Henry Rolle with Biomedical Sciences as her major. She became a teacher at Fort Collins High School, and on August 24, 2019, she became a naturalized citizen of the United States.

== Personal bests ==
Event	Time (seconds)	Venue	Date
Outdoor
200 meters	23.65 (wind: +0.1 m/s)	Auburn, United States	4 April 2009
400 meters	53.49	Port of Spain, Trinidad and Tobago	25 June 2005
100 metres hurdles	12.99 (wind: +2.0 m/s)	Tallahassee, United States	9 May 2009
400 metres hurdles	53.20 NR	Berlin, Germany	20 August 2009
Indoor
55 metres hurdles	7.64	Gainesville, United States	25 February 2006
60 metres hurdles	8.20	Fayetteville, United States	10 March 2006

- All information taken from IAAF profile.

== Achievements ==
Year	Competition	Venue	Position	Event	Notes
Representing Trinidad and Tobago
2000	CARIFTA Games (U17)	St. George's, Grenada	4th	100m hurdles (76.2 cm)	14.79 (wind: +0.3 m/s)
2000	CARIFTA Games (U17)	St. George's, Grenada	9th	Long jump	5.12m (wind: NWI)
2000	Central American and Caribbean Junior Championships (U17)	San Juan, Puerto Rico	4th	100m hurdles (76.2 cm)	14.73 (wind: NWI)
2000	Central American and Caribbean Junior Championships (U17)	San Juan, Puerto Rico	2nd	300m hurdles (76.2 cm)	45.34
2000	Central American and Caribbean Junior Championships (U17)	San Juan, Puerto Rico	7th	Long jump	5.52m (wind: NWI)
2000	Central American and Caribbean Junior Championships (U17)	San Juan, Puerto Rico	2nd	4 × 100 m relay	47.91
2002	CARIFTA Games (U17)	Nassau, Bahamas	—	400m	DNF
2003	CARIFTA Games (U20)	Port of Spain, Trinidad and Tobago	3rd	400m hurdles (76.2 cm)	58.55
2003	CARIFTA Games (U20)	Port of Spain, Trinidad and Tobago	2nd	4 × 400 m relay	3:40.08
2003	Pan American Junior Championships	Bridgetown, Barbados	2nd	400m hurdles (76.2 cm)	58.43
2003	Central American and Caribbean Championships	St. George's, Grenada	6th	400m hurdles	59.37
2003	Central American and Caribbean Championships	St. George's, Grenada	4th	4 × 100 m relay	44.42
2005	Central American and Caribbean Championships	Nassau, Bahamas	4th	400 m hurdles	57.63
2005	Central American and Caribbean Championships	Nassau, Bahamas	4th	4 × 100 m relay	3:35.55
2005	World Championships	Helsinki, Finland	28th (h)	400 m hurdles	58.99
2006	NACAC Under-23 Championships	Santo Domingo, Dominican Republic	2nd	100m hurdles	13.26 (wind: +0.4 m/s)
2006	NACAC Under-23 Championships	Santo Domingo, Dominican Republic	1st	400m hurdles	55.99
2006	NACAC Under-23 Championships	Santo Domingo, Dominican Republic	3rd	4 × 400 m relay	3:44.23
2006	Central American and Caribbean Games	Cartagena, Colombia	2nd	400m hurdles	55.60
2006	Central American and Caribbean Games	Cartagena, Colombia	6th	4 × 400 m relay	3:50.89
2008	Central American and Caribbean Championships	Cali, Colombia	6th	100m hurdles	13.46 A (wind: +1.4 m/s)
2008	Central American and Caribbean Championships	Cali, Colombia	1st	400m hurdles	56.55 A
2008	Olympic Games	Beijing, China	23rd (h)	400m hurdles	57.76
2009	World Championships	Berlin, Germany	3rd	400m hurdles	53.20
2009	World Athletics Final	Thessaloniki, Greece	3rd	400m hurdles	54.31
2011	Central American and Caribbean Championships	Mayagüez, Puerto Rico	5th	400m hurdles	58.27
2011	Central American and Caribbean Championships	Mayagüez, Puerto Rico	3rd	4 × 400 m relay	3:34.84
2014	Commonwealth Games	Glasgow, United Kingdom	7th	100m hurdles	13.41 (wind: -0.1 m/s)
2014	Commonwealth Games	Glasgow, United Kingdom	—	400m hurdles	DQ
2014	Central American and Caribbean Games	Xalapa, Mexico	4th	100m hurdles	13.62 A (wind: -0.8 m/s)
2015	Pan American Games	Toronto, Canada	14th (h)	400m hurdles	60.30
2015	NACAC Championships	San José, Costa Rica	12th (h)	400m hurdles	58.69
