= 2002 Central American and Caribbean Junior Championships in Athletics =

XV Central American and Caribbean Junior Championships
- Dates: 5–7 July
- Host city: Bridgetown, Barbados
- Venue: National Stadium
- Level: Junior and Youth
- Events: 69 (38 junior, 31 youth)
- Participation: about 445 (275 junior, 170 youth) athletes from 32 nations
- Records set: 22 championship records

The 15th Central American and Caribbean Junior Championships were held in the National Stadium in Bridgetown, Barbados between 5–7 July 2002. A discussion of the results is given. Usain Bolt of Jamaica set a total of 6 new championship records.

== Records ==
A total of 22 new championship records were set. Moreover, during the Girls' U-20 Javelin Throw, there were probably a couple of intermediate records set: Yuneisy Rodríguez of Cuba 46.96m, Ana Gutiérrez of Mexico 46.98m, and again Yuneisy Rodríguez 48.48m, as well as in the Girls' U-20 Triple Jump: Arianna Martínez of Cuba 13.43m, and Mabel Gay of Cuba 13.65m.

Event	Record	Athlete	Country	Type
Boys Under 20 (Junior)
100 m	10.18s (0.7 m/s)	Darrel Brown	Trinidad and Tobago	CR
1500 m	3:45.20	Juan Luis Barrios	Mexico	CR
Girls Under 20 (Junior)
200 m	23.22s (-0.9 m/s)	Simone Facey	Jamaica	CR
400 m	52.81s	Sheryl Morgan	Jamaica	CR
800 m	2:06.13	Yuneisy Santiusty	Cuba	CR
1500 m	4:24.96	Yuneisy Santiusty	Cuba	CR
100 m hurdles	12.93s (0.0 m/s)	Anay Tejeda	Cuba	CR
400 m hurdles	57.84s	Yusmelys García	Venezuela	CR
Pole vault	3.70m	Citlalli Huerta	Mexico	CR
Triple jump	13.93m (-0.6 m/s)	Mabel Gay	Cuba	CR
Javelin	48.53m	Yuneisy Rodríguez	Cuba	CR
Boys Under 17 (Youth)
200 m	21.34s (heat) (0.3 m/s)	Usain Bolt	Jamaica	CR
200 m	20.61s (-0.4 m/s)	Usain Bolt	Jamaica	CR
400 m	48.00s (heat)	Usain Bolt	Jamaica	CR
400 m	47.12s	Usain Bolt	Jamaica	CR
1500 m	3:56.60	Edgar Santoyo	Mexico	CR
5000 m Race Walk	21:24.33	Éder Sánchez	Mexico	CR
4 × 100 m relay	40.95s	Dwain Bryden; Usain Bolt; Andre Wellington; Matthew Palmer	Jamaica	CR
4 × 400 m relay	3:16.61	Nasser Johnson; Josef Robertson; Davian Parker; Usain Bolt	Jamaica	CR
Girls Under 17 (Youth)
100 m	11.59s (0.0 m/s)	Anneisha McLaughlin	Jamaica	CR
200 m	23.27s (-1.0 m/s)	Anneisha McLaughlin	Jamaica	CR
4 × 100 m relay	45.33s	Shelly-Ann Fraser; Anneisha McLaughlin; Latoya Greaves; Diane Dietrich	Jamaica	CR

Key

AR — Area record • CR — Championship record • NR — National record

== Medal summary ==
The results are published.

=== Male Junior A (under 20) ===
Event	Gold		Silver		Bronze	
100 metres (0.7 m/s)	Darrel Brown (TRI)	10.18 CR	Marc Burns (TRI)	10.42	Winston Hutton (JAM)	10.58
200 metres (0.1 m/s)	Grafton Ifill (BAH)	20.89	Sékou Clarke (JAM)	21.05	Orion Nicely (JAM)	21.19
400 metres	Jermaine Gonzales (JAM)	45.80	Wilan Louis (BAR)	46.04	Yhann Plummer (JAM)	46.38
800 metres	Jermaine Myers (JAM)	1:50.36	Juan Luis Barrios (MEX)	1:52.36	Shaun Smith (JAM)	1:52.77
1500 metres	Juan Luis Barrios (MEX)	3:45.20 CR	Isaías Haro (MEX)	3:49.00	Shaun Smith (JAM)	3:54.93
5000 metres	Isaías Haro (MEX)	15:15.87	Danny Cornieles (VEN)	15:18.82	Cleveland Forde (GUY)	15:21.71
10,000 metres	Danny Cornieles (VEN)	31:35.86	Edilberto Méndez (MEX)	31:42.80	Cleveland Forde (GUY)	31:51.13
110 metres hurdles (-0.2 m/s)	Sheldon Leith (JAM)	14.72	Shamar Sands (BAH)	14.79	Alleyne Lett (GRN)	14.83
400 metres hurdles	Greg Little (JAM)	50.95	Roberto García (MEX)	52.14	Richard Phillips (JAM)	52.36
High jump	Germaine Mason (JAM)	2.23	Damon Thompson (BAR)	2.20	Olutola Fakehinde (JAM)	2.15
Pole vault	Christián Sánchez (MEX)	4.80	Dany Pratt (MEX)	4.40	Pedro Fuentes (ESA)	4.20
Long jump	Sedain McDonald (JAM)	7.44 (0.1 m/s)	Jairo Guibert (CUB)	7.42 (0.8 m/s)	Irving Saladino (PAN)	7.39 (-0.2 m/s)
Triple jump	David Giralt (CUB)	16.75 (1.8 m/s)	Osniel Tosca (CUB)	15.87 (1.0 m/s)	Ayata Joseph (ATG)	15.56 (0.2 m/s)
Shot put	Kimani Kirton (JAM)	16.93	Shamir Thomas (GRN)	16.83	Juan Jaramillo (VEN)	16.72
Discus throw	Eric Mathias (IVB)	51.36	Jesús Sánchez (MEX)	51.21	Shamir Thomas (GRN)	50.97
Javelin throw	Yudel Moreno (CUB)	67.59	Jamal Forde (BAR)	63.27	Dayron Márquez (COL)	62.86
Decathlon	Alan Mitchell (TRI)	6637	Randy Gutiérrez (VEN)	6203	Adrian Griffith (BAH)	6123
10,000 metres track walk	Álvaro García (MEX)	44:58.30	José Pérez (MEX)	45:14.98	Ezequiel Nazario (PUR)	45:26.09
4 × 100 metres relay	Trinidad and Tobago	39.95	Jamaica; Winston Hutton; Orion Nicely; Adian Cephas; Yhann Plummer	40.19	Bahamas; Don Wood; Grafton Ifill; Michael Mathieu; Jerrel Forbes	40.57
4 × 400 metres relay	Jamaica; Jacques Smith; Sékou Clarke; Yhann Plummer; Jermaine Gonzales	3:07.61	Bahamas; Drameco Bridgewater; Michael Mathieu; Andrae Williams; Andretti Bain	3:11.11	Venezuela; Ronald Amaya; Kevin Balzán; Ángel Rodríguez; Luis Luna	3:11.91

=== Female Junior A (under 20) ===
Event	Gold		Silver		Bronze	
100 metres (0.0 m/s)	Simone Facey (JAM)	11.46	Sherone Simpson (JAM)	11.60	Lyn-Marie Cox (BAR)	11.76
200 metres (-0.9 m/s)	Simone Facey (JAM)	23.22 CR	Lyn-Marie Cox (BAR)	23.86	Nickesha Anderson (JAM)	24.03
400 metres	Sheryl Morgan (JAM)	52.81 CR	Davita Prendergast (JAM)	54.10	Tiandra Ponteen (SKN)	54.17
800 metres	Yuneisy Santiusty (CUB)	2:06.13 CR	Carlene Robinson (JAM)	2:07.30	Gabriela Medina (MEX)	2:10.35
1500 metres	Yuneisy Santiusty (CUB)	4:24.96 CR	María Elena Valencia (MEX)	4:33.72	Janill Williams (ATG)	4:39.08
3000 metres	María Elena Valencia (MEX)	10:10.96	Yanelli Neri (MEX)	10:14.43	Nessa Paul (LCA)	10:25.23
100 metres hurdles (0.0 m/s)	Anay Tejeda (CUB)	12.93 CR	Keisha Brown (JAM)	13.94	Sandrine Legenort (VEN)	13.98
400 metres hurdles	Yusmelys García (VEN)	57.84 CR	Camille Robinson (JAM)	58.04	Veronia Patterson (JAM)	58.96
High jump	Levern Spencer (LCA)	1.81	Catherine Ibargüen (COL)	1.79	Peaches Roach (JAM)	1.79
Pole vault^{†}	Citlalli Huerta (MEX)	3.70 CR	Michelle Rivera (ESA)	3.55	Isadora García (MEX)	3.40
Long jump	Yargelis Savigne (CUB)	6.25 (-1.3 m/s)	Peta-Gaye Beckford (JAM)	6.15 (1.1 m/s)	Kedine Geddes (JAM)	6.12 (0.0 m/s)
Triple jump	Mabel Gay (CUB)	13.93 CR (-0.6 m/s)	Arianna Martínez (CUB)	13.43 (-2.2 m/s)	Catherine Ibargüen (COL)	13.01 (-1.3 m/s)
Shot put	Mailín Vargas (CUB)	14.26	Kaia Durrant-Naire (JAM)	12.96	Kimet Sánchez (DOM)	12.10
Discus throw	Shernelle Nicholls (BAR)	44.23	Aymara Albury (BAH)	41.17	Natalee Pesoa (JAM)	40.86
Javelin throw	Yuneisy Rodríguez (CUB)	48.53 CR	Ana Gutiérrez (MEX)	46.98	Kimet Sánchez (DOM)	45.52
5000 metres track walk	Estela Hernández (MEX)	24:48.15	Karla Benavides (ESA)	24:53.21	Linett Bustamente (MEX)	25:56.12
4 × 100 metres relay	Jamaica; Sherone Simpson; Nadine Palmer; Nickesha Anderson; Simone Facey	44.30	Barbados; Katrina Carter; Genna Williams; Lyn-Marie Cox; Jade Bailey	45.48	Saint Kitts and Nevis; Julietta Johnson; Tiandra Ponteen; Nathandra John; Virgil Hodge	46.65
4 × 400 metres relay	Jamaica; Camille Robinson; Davita Prendergast; Carlene Robinson; Sheryl Morgan	3:34.76	Venezuela; Jenny Mejías; Sandrine Legenort; Angela Alfonso; Yusmelys García	3:44.69	Barbados; Jade Bailey; Genna Williams; Sharon Larrier; Lyn-Marie Cox	3:45.18

^{†}: Event marked as exhibition.

=== Male Junior B (under 17) ===
Event	Gold		Silver		Bronze	
100 metres (0.3 m/s)	Moroni Rubio (MEX)	10.73	Jaheed Smith (BIZ)	10.91	Tyrone Sawyer (BAH)	11.00
200 metres (-0.4 m/s)	Usain Bolt (JAM)	20.61 CR	Jaheed Smith (BIZ)	21.83	Moroni Rubio (MEX)	21.84
400 metres	Usain Bolt (JAM)	47.12 CR	Jamil James (TRI)	47.95	Rimardo Rolle (BAH)	49.12
800 metres	Salvador Mateo (DOM)	1:56.33	James Baird (ATG)	1:56.71	Chadrick Nelson (JAM)	1:57.90
1500 metres	Edgar Santoyo (MEX)	3:56.60 CR	James Baird (ATG)	4:05.14	Ricardo Estremera (PUR)	4:08.64
3000 metres	José Antonio Uribe (MEX)	8:46.68	Leonardo Trejo (MEX)	8:53.48	Ricardo Estremera (PUR)	8:55.25
100 metres hurdles (0.0 m/s)	Matthew Palmer (JAM)	13.27	Damian Farmer (BAR)	13.31	Rudolph Lowe (JAM)	13.55
400 metres hurdles	Damian Farmer (BAR)	53.65	José Paniagua (DOM)	54.19	Josef Robertson (JAM)	54.65
High jump	Alain Bailey (JAM)	2.02	Edgar Torres (MEX)	2.02	Jermaine Alphous Jackson (JAM)	1.99
Long jump	Alain Bailey (JAM)	6.77 (0.8 m/s)	Delano Coakley (BAH)	6.70 (1.7 m/s)	Irving Castro (MEX)	6.64 (0.1 m/s)
Triple jump	Ramon Farrington (BAH)	14.25 (0.1 m/s)	Josell Ramírez (CRC)	13.95 (-0.8 m/s)	Jermaine Alphous Jackson (JAM)	13.90 (-2.4 m/s)
Shot put	Adonson Shallow (VIN)	15.14	Carlix Román (PUR)	14.61	Aarón Valadez (MEX)	13.83
Discus throw	Aarón Valadez (MEX)	44.35	Neil Pinder (BAH)	41.93	Adonson Shallow (VIN)	40.60
Javelin throw	Ramon Farrington (BAH)	60.89	Adonson Shallow (VIN)	55.30	Murvine Charles (GRN)	55.17
5000 metres track walk	Éder Sánchez (MEX)	21:24.33 CR	Gerardo Chávez (MEX)	23:12.82	Marco Benavides (ESA)	24:36.28
4 × 100 metres relay	Jamaica; Dwain Bryden; Usain Bolt; Andre Wellington; Matthew Palmer	40.95 CR	Trinidad and Tobago	42.73	Barbados; Kareem Boyce; Ryan Smith; Ramon Gittens; Jamar Nurse	42.79
4 × 400 metres relay	Jamaica; Nasser Johnson; Josef Robertson; Davian Parker; Usain Bolt	3:16.61 CR	Trinidad and Tobago; Damon Douglas; Oshun Glasgow; Dante Carrington; Jamil James	3:19.13	Puerto Rico; Marcos Sánchez-Valle; Carlos Benítez; Miguel Ortíz; Joseph Rodríguez	3:22.39

=== Female Junior B (under 17) ===
Event	Gold		Silver		Bronze	
100 metres (0.0 m/s)	Anneisha McLaughlin (JAM)	11.59 CR	Diane Dietrich (JAM)	11.76	Afeisha O'Neil (TRI)	12.04
200 metres (-1.0 m/s)	Anneisha McLaughlin (JAM)	23.27 CR	Kelly Ann Baptiste (TRI)	24.82	Tavara Rigby (BAH)	24.90
400 metres	Kashain Page (JAM)	55.30	Kineke Alexander (VIN)	55.42	Abigail David (TRI)	56.32
800 metres	Jennifer Velázquez (PUR)	2:11.83	Arusha McKenzie (JAM)	2:12.06	Cadien Beckford (JAM)	2:13.40
1200 metres	Arusha McKenzie (JAM)	3:36.41	Beverly Ramos (PUR)	3:37.38	Cristina Guevara (MEX)	3:38.46
300 metres hurdles	Kashain Page (JAM)	42.26	Marty Phillips (GRN)	43.62	Trishana McGowan (JAM)	44.06
High jump	Marielys Rojas (VEN)	1.71	Rhonda Watkins (TRI)	1.71	Kimberley Cadogan (BAR)	1.68
Long jump	Rhonda Watkins (TRI)	5.56 (-0.4 m/s)	Tamara Francis (JAM)	5.55 (0.0 m/s)	Thonya Joseph (BAR)	5.33 (-0.1 m/s)
Triple jump	LaToya Heath (JAM)	11.60 (0.5 m/s)	Latroya Darrell (BER)	11.31 (0.1 m/s)	Shantal Maldonado (MEX)	11.27 (0.3 m/s)
Shot put	Ahymará Espinoza (VEN)	13.97	Tressa-Anne Charles (LCA)	12.22	Brittney Marshall (BER)	11.96
Discus throw	Brittney Marshall (BER)	38.46	María Padilla (MEX)	37.37	Keisha Walkes (BAR)	36.45
Javelin throw	Ilsa Rodríguez (MEX)	37.96	Anna Lovell (BAR)	36.62	Tracy Morrison (BAH)	35.81
4 × 100 metres relay	Jamaica; Shelly-Ann Fraser; Anneisha McLaughlin; Latoya Greaves; Diane Dietrich	45.33 CR	Barbados; Nakita Clarke; Keisha Walkes; Anna Lovell; Shadir Greene	46.83	Bahamas; Tamara Rigby; Cotrell Martin; Crista Strachan; Eugenia Neely	47.08
4 × 400 metres relay	Trinidad and Tobago; Latasha Roach; Crystal Skeete; Sade St. Louis; Abigail David	3:41.83	Jamaica; Diedre Harrison; Cadien Beckford; Latoya Greaves; Kashain Page	3:42.45	Bahamas; Crystal Strachan; Tavara Rigby; Crista Strachan; Tamara Rigby	3:49.76

== Medal table ==
The medal count was published.

=== Total ===
* Host nation (Barbados)

Rank	Nation	Gold	Silver	Bronze	Total
1	Jamaica (JAM)	27	13	19	59
2	Mexico (MEX)	13	14	8	35
3	Cuba (CUB)	9	3	0	12
4	Trinidad and Tobago (TTO)	5	6	2	13
5	Venezuela (VEN)	4	3	3	10
6	Bahamas (BAH)	3	5	8	16
7	Barbados (BAR)*	2	8	6	16
8	Puerto Rico (PUR)	1	2	4	7
9	Saint Vincent and the Grenadines (VIN)	1	2	1	4
10	Dominican Republic (DOM)	1	1	2	4
11	Bermuda (BER)	1	1	0	2
11	Saint Lucia (LCA)	1	1	0	2
13	British Virgin Islands (IVB)	1	0	0	1
14	Grenada (GRN)	0	2	3	5
15	Antigua and Barbuda (ATG)	0	2	2	4
15	El Salvador (ESA)	0	2	2	4
17	Belize (BIZ)	0	2	0	2
18	Colombia (COL)	0	1	2	3
19	Costa Rica (CRC)	0	1	0	1
20	Guyana (GUY)	0	0	2	2
20	Saint Kitts and Nevis (SKN)	0	0	2	2
22	Panama (PAN)	0	0	1	1
Totals (22 entries)		69	69	67	205

== Participation (unofficial) ==
Detailed result lists can be found on the World Junior Athletics History website. An unofficial count yields a number of about 443 athletes (257 junior (under-20) and 159 youth (under-17)) from about 32 countries, a new record number of participating nations:

- Anguilla (4)
- Antigua and Barbuda (9)
- Aruba (2)
- Bahamas (37)
- Barbados (44)
- Bermuda (8)
- Belize (2)
- British Virgin Islands (4)
- Cayman Islands (3)
- Colombia (3)
- Costa Rica (2)
- Cuba (13)
- Dominica (5)
- Dominican Republic (12)
- El Salvador (6)
- Grenada (10)
- Guatemala (7)
- Guyana (8)
- (Haiti) Haïti (1)
- Honduras (1)
- Jamaica (65)
- (Mexico) México (50)
- Netherlands Antilles (2)
- Nicaragua (1)
- (Panama) Panamá (5)
- Puerto Rico (47)
- Saint Kitts and Nevis (9)
- Saint Lucia (7)
- Saint Vincent and the Grenadines (19)
- Trinidad and Tobago (41)
- Turks and Caicos Islands (1)
- Venezuela (17)
