= Shamar Sands =

Bahamian hurdler

Personal information
- Born: 30 April 1985 (age 41) Nassau, Bahamas

Sport
- Sport: Track and field
Medal record
Representing Bahamas
Central American and Caribbean Championships in Athletics
Gold medal – first place	2008 Cali	100 m hurdles
Silver medal – second place	2008 Cali	4x100 m relay
World Junior Championships
Bronze medal – third place	2002 Kingston	110 m hurdles
CAC Junior Championships (U20)
Silver medal – second place	2002 Bridgetown	110 m hurdles
CARIFTA Games Junior (U20)
Gold medal – first place	2002 Nassau	110 m hurdles
Silver medal – second place	2003 Port of Spain	110 m hurdles
Bronze medal – third place	2003 Port of Spain	4x100 m relay
CARIFTA Games Youth (U17)
Silver medal – second place	2001 Bridgetown	100 m hurdles

Shamar Sands (born 30 April 1985) is a Bahamian track and field athlete who specialises in the 110 metres hurdles. He is the Bahamian national record holder in the event with 13.40 seconds. Sands is the cousin of triple jumper Leevan Sands and also has a degree in accounting.

Sands made his first appearance at a major tournament in 2001, competing at the World Youth Championships in Athletics. He reached the semi-finals of 110 m hurdles but finished with a disappointing 14.36 seconds, over half a second slower than the personal best he had set the previous day. He performed well in the 2002 World Junior Championships, taking the bronze medal in the 110 m hurdles (91.4 cm) event, setting a personal best of 13.67 seconds with a strong tail wind.

His first major senior tournament came in 2007: although he had improved his best to 13.47 seconds that summer, he failed to progress beyond the heats at the Osaka World Championships. The following year he attended his first major indoor tournament, but did not get past the heats, recording a sub-par 7.97 seconds in the 60 metre hurdles at the 2008 World Indoor Championships. He qualified to represent his country at the 2008 Beijing Olympics and reached the quarter-finals.

The 2009 season began with significant improvements for Sands. He registered a 60 m hurdles best of 7.49 seconds in the indoor season and set the national record in the 110 m hurdles at the 2009 Osaka Grand Prix. He was pleased with both the achievement and winning the race, which he had done despite hitting two of the hurdles.

Sands was coached most of his professional career by Henry Rolle.

== Personal bests ==
Event	Best	Location	Date
50 m hurdles	6.40 s	Liévin, France	10 February 2009
55 m hurdles	7.17 s	Gainesville, Florida, United States	27 January 2007
60 m hurdles	7.49 s	Liévin, France	2 February 2009
110 m hurdles	13.38 s	Ostrava, Czech Republic	17 June 2009
