= 2003 CARIFTA Games =

XXXII CARIFTA Games
- Dates: April 19–21
- Host city: Port of Spain, Trinidad and Tobago
- Venue: Hasely Crawford National Stadium
- Level: Junior and Youth
- Events: 66 (35 junior (incl. 3 open), 31 youth)
- Participation: about 427 (219 junior, 208 youth) athletes from about 23 nations
- Records set: 14 games records

The 32nd CARIFTA Games were held in the Hasely Crawford National Stadium in Port of Spain, Trinidad and Tobago on April 19–21, 2003. A detailed report on the results was given.

== Participation (unofficial) ==
Detailed result lists can be found on the CFPI and the "World Junior Athletics History" website. An unofficial count yields the number of about 427 athletes (219 junior (under-20) and 208 youth (under-17)) from about 23 countries: Anguilla (3), Antigua and Barbuda (15), Aruba (4), Bahamas (64), Barbados (21), Bermuda (7), British Virgin Islands (7), Cayman Islands (13), Dominica (4), French Guiana (2), Grenada (47), Guadeloupe (20), Guyana (15), Haiti (7), Jamaica (70), Martinique (19), Netherlands Antilles (15), Saint Kitts and Nevis (6), Saint Lucia (8), Saint Vincent and the Grenadines (5), Trinidad and Tobago (66), Turks and Caicos Islands (8), US Virgin Islands (1).

== Records ==
A total of 14 games records were set.

In the boys' U-20 category, Usain Bolt from Jamaica set three new games records finishing the 200 metres in 20.43s (wind: -1.1 m/s), the 400 metres in 46.35s, and together with the Jamaican 4 × 100 m relay team in 39.43s. In triple jump, Ayata Joseph from Antigua and Barbuda set a new mark of 16.20 metres. In shot put, Jamaican Kimani Kirton achieved 17.33 metres. In the discus throw competition, the old mark of 50.41 metres by Jamaican Dwayne Henclewood from the year 2000 was improved three times. First, Kimani Kirton from Jamaica threw 51.25 metres in his second attempt. Then, Eric Mathias from the British Virgin Islands reached 51.43 metres in his fifth attempt, before setting the final mark of 55.20 metres in the last attempt.

In the girls' U-20 category, Camile Robinson from Jamaica finished the 400 metres hurdles in 56.61 seconds. The Jamaican 4x400 metres relay team set the new record to 3:36.20. Peaches Roach from Jamaica and Levern Spencer from Saint Lucia jumped 1.86 metres high.

In the boys' U-17 category, Romaine Gordon from Jamaica won the 100 metres hurdles in the new record time of 13.12s (wind: (-1.8 m/s).

Finally, in the girls' U-17 category, Kimberly Williams from Jamaica set the new record in triple jump of 12.18 metres (wind: 0.3 m/s), and the Jamaican 4x400 metres team achieved 3:39.50.

== Austin Sealy Award ==
The Austin Sealy Trophy for the most outstanding athlete of the games was awarded to Usain Bolt from Jamaica. He won 4 gold medals (200m, 400m, 4 × 100 m relay, and 4 × 400 m relay) in the junior (U-20) category, achieving three new games records.

== Medal summary ==
Medal winners are published by category: Boys under 20 (Junior), Girls under 20 (Junior), Boys under 17 (Youth), and Girls under 17 (Youth). Complete results can be found on the CFPI and the "World Junior Athletics History" website.

=== Boys under 20 (Junior) ===
Event	Gold		Silver		Bronze	
100 metres (3.8 m/s)	Darrel Brown (TRI)	10.20w	Churandy Martina (AHO)	10.37w	Tesfa Latty (JAM)	10.40w
200 metres (-1.1 m/s)	Usain Bolt (JAM)	20.43 CR	Daniel Bailey (ATG)	21.10	Adrian Durant (ISV)	21.14
400 metres	Usain Bolt (JAM)	46.35 CR	Jamil James (TRI)	47.34	Andretti Bain (BAH)	47.39
800 metres	Mellard Brown (JAM)	1:50.49	Davian Parker (JAM)	1:52.08	Carlan Arthur (TRI)	1:52.22
1500 metres	Carlan Arthur (TRI)	4:03.29	Alex Sawyer (BAH)	4:03.32	Ran Joseph (LCA)	4:03.81
5000 metres	Cleveland Forde (GUY)	15:27.42	Jason Elleson (JAM)	15:35.64	Kerone Fairweather (JAM)	16:14.24
110 metres hurdles (-3.1 m/s)	Eddy De Lépine (MTQ)	14.25	Shamar Sands (BAH)	14.48	Pete Smith (JAM)	14.64
400 metres hurdles	Kimani Williams (JAM)	51.22	Isa Phillips (JAM)	51.29	Andretti Bain (BAH)	53.68
High jump	Carlos Mattis (JAM)	2.09	Garvin Peters (GRN); Omar Wright (CAY)	2.03		
Pole vault	Wasim Walker (JAM)	4.01				
Long jump	Damion Young (JAM)	7.40 (-1.8 m/s)	Cédric Bergoz (MTQ)	7.27 (0.6 m/s)	Shawn Thomas (TRI)	7.27 (1.7 m/s)
Triple jump	Ayata Joseph (ATG)	16.20 CR (1.0 m/s)	Carlos Mattis (JAM)	15.19w (3.0 m/s)	Jamal Cumberbatch (BAR)	14.80w (2.3 m/s)
Shot put	Kimani Kirton (JAM)	17.33 CR	Fabian Morgan (JAM)	16.78	David Villeneuve (MTQ)	16.62
Discus throw	Eric Mathias (IVB)	55.20 CR	Kimani Kirton (JAM)	51.25	David Villeneuve (MTQ)	51.09
Javelin throw	Jamal Forde (BAR)	65.46	Christophe Marie-Nelly (MTQ)	60.83	Densley Joseph (GRN)	59.05
Heptathlon	Wilbert Walker (JAM)	4837	Akido Noel (GRN)	4613	Mikel Courtney (TRI)	4523
4 x 100 metres relay	Jamaica; Winston Hutton; Orion Nicely; Tesfa Latty; Usain Bolt	39.43 CR	Trinidad and Tobago; Marcus Duncan; Dion Rodriguez; Mark Phillip; Darrel Brown	40.64	Bahamas; Shamar Sands; Alonzo Hinds; Tyrone Sawyer; Oscar Greene	40.80
4 x 400 metres relay	Jamaica; Mellard Brown; Kimani Williams; Isa Phillips; Usain Bolt	3:09.70	Trinidad and Tobago; Joel Pile; Kellon Francis; Deverne Charles; Jamil James	3:12.46	Bahamas; Allison Bridgewater; Tyrone Sawyer; Jacobi Mitchell; Andretti Bain	3:13.72

: Open event for both junior and youth athletes.

=== Girls under 20 (Junior) ===
Event	Gold		Silver		Bronze	
100 metres (3.8 m/s)	Kerron Stewart (JAM)	11.41w	Sherone Simpson (JAM)	11.44w	Wanda Hutson (TRI)	11.68w
200 metres (-3.0 m/s)	Tiandra Ponteen (SKN)	23.71	Nickesha Anderson (JAM)	23.76	Kerron Stewart (JAM)	23.93
400 metres	Anneisha McLaughlin (JAM)	52.57	Tiandra Ponteen (SKN)	52.76	Davita Prendergast (JAM)	53.96
800 metres	Carlene Robinson (JAM)	2:07.56	Kayann Thompson (JAM)	2:07.94	Denelle de Verteuil (TRI)	2:14.04
1500 metres	Kayann Thompson (JAM)	4:31.75	Janill Williams (ATG)	4:37.08	Vanessa Whittle (JAM)	4:38.03
3000 metres	Janill Williams (ATG)	10:12.32	Jennifer Chichester (GUY)	10:14.08	Lorain McKenzie (JAM)	10:15.47
100 metres hurdles (-2.2 m/s)	Nadina Marsh (JAM)	13.89	Keisha Brown (JAM)	13.96	Géraldine Lecefel (MTQ)	14.56
400 metres hurdles	Camile Robinson (JAM)	56.61 CR	Carlene Robinson (JAM)	58.47	Josanne Lucas (TRI)	58.55
High jump	Peaches Roach (JAM)	1.86 CR	Levern Spencer (LCA)	1.86 CR	Shaunette Davidson (JAM)	1.84
Long jump	Elysée Vesanes (MTQ)	6.28 (1.5 m/s)	Kedine Geddes (JAM)	6.23w (2.9 m/s)	Charisse Bacchus (TRI)	6.13w (3.3 m/s)
Triple jump	Sheron Mark (TRI)	12.82	Zelica Montout (GLP)	12.74	Prescillia Corneille (GLP)	12.63
Shot put	Aymara Albury (BAH)	13.62	Tressa-Anne Charles (LCA)	13.21	Astrid Hemat (GUF)	12.37
Discus throw	Shernelle Nicholls (BAR)	41.77	LokToya McShine (TRI)	40.10	Aymara Albury (BAH)	39.80
Javelin throw	Nathalia Vincent (GRN)	43.53	Erma Gene Evans (LCA)	43.08	Melinda Bastian (BAH)	40.91
Pentathlon	Nadina Marsh (JAM)	3868	Charisse Bacchus (TRI)	3548w	Cuquie Melville (TRI)	3401
4 x 100 metres relay	Jamaica; Jodi-Ann Powell; Kerron Stewart; Nickesha Anderson; Sherone Simpson	44.42	Trinidad and Tobago; Dianne Cooke; Wanda Hutson; Monique Cabral; Kelly-Ann Baptiste	45.09	Bahamas; Cotrell Martin; Leonie Ezegbunam; Felicia Sturrup; Utica Edgecombe	46.47
4 x 400 metres relay	Jamaica; Davita Prendergast; Carlene Robinson; Camille Robinson; Anneisha McLaughlin	3:36.20 CR	Trinidad and Tobago; Crystal Skeete; Abigail David; Josanne Lucas; Kyesha Hills	3:40.08	Bahamas; Cotrell Martin; Sidell Ingraham; Lanece Clarke; Felicia Sturrup	3:53.86

: Open event for both junior and youth athletes.

=== Boys under 17 (Youth) ===
Event	Gold		Silver		Bronze	
100 metres (1.3 m/s)	Remaldo Rose (JAM)	10.65	Jerraine Downie (JAM)	10.72	Ramon Gittens (BAR)	10.92
200 metres (-2.1 m/s)	Mekel Downer (JAM)	22.25	Akeem Forde (BAR)	22.27	Jerraine Downie (JAM)	22.30
400 metres	Josef Robertson (JAM)	48.54	Renny Quow (TRI)	48.97	Akeem Forde (BAR)	49.60
800 metres	Jamaal James (TRI)	1:56.15	Kamar Ellis (JAM)	1:56.92	Melvin Weller (JAM)	1:57.27
1500 metres	Neilon Joseph (GRN)	4:13.52	Roderick Rock (BAR)	4:15.69	Robert Watson (JAM)	4:17.00
3000 metres	Neilon Joseph (GRN)	9:20.50	Sandino Nero (TRI)	9:22.75	Lorry Lucea (MTQ)	9:29.60
100 metres hurdles (-1.8 m/s)	Romaine Gordon (JAM)	13.12 CR	Akeil Facey (JAM)	13.44	Stevy Theliam (MTQ)	13.70
400 metres hurdles	Josef Robertson (JAM)	53.69	Terry Marshall (BAR)	54.81	Andre Pratt (JAM)	56.44
High jump	Alain Bailey (JAM)	2.03	Akeil Facey (JAM)	2.00	Joel Phillip (GRN)	1.95
Long jump	Joel Phillip (GRN)	6.98 (-1.5 m/s)	Alain Bailey (JAM)	6.92 (0.3 m/s)	Claude Paul (AHO)	6.75 (0.2 m/s)
Triple jump	Brandon Joseph (ATG)	14.21 (1.3 m/s)	Barry Batson (BAR)	14.14w (2.9 m/s)	Joel Phillip (GRN)	14.06 (-0.9 m/s)
Shot put	Tyron Benjamin (DMA)	15.17	Deon Charles (GRN)	14.56	Ramon Harewood (BAR)	13.71
Discus throw	Sharif Small (JAM)	47.39	Tyron Benjamin (DMA)	44.12	Raedon Gill (GRN)	40.49
Javelin throw	Jody Placid (GRN)	57.71	Jonathan Denis (GLP)	55.97	Wayne George (GRN)	49.29
4 x 100 metres relay	Jamaica; Josef Robertson; Andre Pratt; Jerraine Downie; Renaldo Rose	41.77	Barbados; Barry Batson; Ramon Gittens; Terry Marshall; Akeem Forde	42.13	Trinidad and Tobago; Kester Charles; Kern Mapp; Jamal Clinton; Kashif Williams	42.19
4 x 400 metres relay	Jamaica; Andre Pratt; Kamar Ellis; Mekel Downer; Josef Robertson	3:19.17	Barbados; Terry Marshall; Roderick Rock; Rasheed Holder; Akeem Forde	3:21.19	Bahamas; Kayuse Burrows; Decode Glinton; Deangelo Griffin; Wilton Martin	3:21.25

=== Girls under 17 (Youth) ===
Event	Gold		Silver		Bronze	
100 metres (1.3 m/s)	Samantha Henry (JAM)	11.71	Tamara Rigby (BAH)	11.79	Shaunetta Stewart (JAM)	11.89
200 metres (-2.2 m/s)	Tavara Rigby (BAH)	24.29	Shaunetta Stewart (JAM)	24.43	Tamara Rigby (BAH)	24.66
400 metres	Annabella Reid (JAM)	53.81	Sonita Sutherland (JAM)	53.90	Tavara Rigby (BAH)	54.92
800 metres	Jodian Richards (JAM)	2:14.57	Pilar McShine (TRI)	2:15.49	Nicole Ledgister (JAM)	2:16.71
1500 metres	Jodian Richards (JAM)	4:37.72	Pilar McShine (TRI)	4:38.67	Jennifer Chichester (GUY)	4:48.06
100 metres hurdles (-2.9 m/s)	Natasha Ruddock (JAM)	14.42	Tavia Burke (JAM)	14.51	Michelle Cumberbatch (BAH)	15.42
300 metres hurdles	Sherene Pinnock (JAM)	42.24	Melony McKay (JAM)	42.61	Nerissa Phillip (GRN)	43.08
High jump	Rhonda Watkins (TRI)	1.73	Latroya Darrell (BER)	1.68	Andrea Moss (BAH)	1.65
Long jump	Rhonda Watkins (TRI)	5.79 (0.8 m/s)	Kimona Smith (JAM)	5.58w (2.7 m/s)	Shara Proctor (AIA)	5.45 (1.1 m/s)
Triple jump	Kimberly Williams (JAM)	12.18 CR (0.3 m/s)	Kimona Smith (JAM)	11.98 (-1.3 m/s)	Lorrie Hamony (GLP)	11.75 (-1.6 m/s)
Shot put	Brittney Marshall (BER)	12.44	Annie Alexander (TRI)	12.01	Sabina Christmas (DMA)	11.80
Discus throw	Sasha Ferguson (BAH)	36.23	Marie-Christine Vulcain (MTQ)	36.02	Brittney Marshall (BER)	35.66
Javelin throw	Amanda Edwards (ATG)	39.06	Tracy Morrison (BAH)	38.48	Laurence Germany (MTQ)	37.16
4 x 100 metres relay	Jamaica; Tavia Burke; Sharneter Stewart; Annabella Reid; Samantha Henry	46.07	Bahamas; Tamara Rigby; Tavara Rigby; Tina Ferguson; T'Shonda Webb	46.75	Guadeloupe; Audrey Rima; Cynthia Gane; Teissa Pierre-Justin; Melina Gallas	47.20
4 x 400 metres relay	Jamaica; Sherene Pinnock; Sonita Sutherland; Melony McKay; Annabella Reid	3:39.50 CR	Bahamas; Tamara Rigby; Deandra Lang; Michelle Cumberbatch; Tavara Rigby	3:48.23	Trinidad and Tobago; Karla Hope; Gineille Felix; Sade St. Louis; Pilar McShine	3:49.29

== Medal table ==
The medal count has been published. It is in agreement with an unofficial medal count.

* Host nation (Trinidad and Tobago)

Rank	Nation	Gold	Silver	Bronze	Total
1	Jamaica (JAM)	39	23	14	76
2	Trinidad and Tobago (TTO)*	6	12	10	28
3	Grenada (GRN)	5	3	6	14
4	Antigua and Barbuda (ATG)	4	2	0	6
5	Bahamas (BAH)	3	6	13	22
6	Barbados (BAR)	2	6	4	12
7	Martinique (MTQ)	2	3	6	11
8	Bermuda (BER)	1	1	1	3
8	Dominica (DMA)	1	1	1	3
8	Guyana (GUY)	1	1	1	3
11	Saint Kitts and Nevis (SKN)	1	1	0	2
12	British Virgin Islands (IVB)	1	0	0	1
13	Saint Lucia (LCA)	0	3	1	4
14	Guadeloupe (GLP)	0	2	3	5
15	Netherlands Antilles (AHO)	0	1	1	2
16	Cayman Islands (CAY)	0	1	0	1
17	Commonwealth Games Federation (CGF)	0	0	1	1
17	French Guiana (GUF)	0	0	1	1
17	U.S. Virgin Islands (VIR)	0	0	1	1
Totals (19 entries)		66	66	64	196
