= Jamil James =

Trinidad and Tobago sprinter

Personal information
- Born: 16 September 1986 (age 39)

Sport
- Sport: Track and field
Medal record
Athletics
Representing Trinidad and Tobago
CAC Junior Championships (U20)
| Bronze medal – third place | 2004 Coatzacoalcos | 200 m |
CAC Junior Championships (U17)
| Silver medal – second place | 2002 Bridgetown | 400 m |
| Silver medal – second place | 2002 Bridgetown | 4x400 m relay |
CARIFTA Games Junior (U20)
| Gold medal – first place | 2005 Bacolet | 4x100 m relay |
| Silver medal – second place | 2005 Bacolet | 400 m |
| Silver medal – second place | 2005 Bacolet | 4x400 m relay |
| Silver medal – second place | 2004 Hamilton | 400 m |
| Silver medal – second place | 2004 Hamilton | 4x400 m relay |
| Silver medal – second place | 2003 Port of Spain | 200 m |
| Silver medal – second place | 2003 Port of Spain | 4x400 m relay |
CARIFTA Games Youth (U17)
| Bronze medal – third place | 2002 Nassau | 200 m |
| Bronze medal – third place | 2002 Nassau | 400 m |

Jamil J James (born 16 September 1986) is a Trinidad and Tobago sprinter who specializes in the 400 metres. His father, Trevor James, is a former Olympic sprinter who represented Trinidad and Tobago in the 1972 Summer Olympics.

== Career ==
He attended and competed for the University of South Carolina from 2004 to 2008. His personal best time is 46.68 seconds (400m), achieved in June 2003 in Port of Spain, Trinidad and Tobago.

== Achievements ==
| Year | Competition | Venue | Position | Event | Notes |
Representing Trinidad and Tobago
| 2001 | CARIFTA Games (U17) | Bridgetown, Barbados | 4th | 400 m | 49.11 |
| 2002 | CARIFTA Games (U17) | Nassau, Bahamas | 3rd | 200 m | 22.02 (-0.5 m/s) |
| 2002 | CARIFTA Games (U17) | Nassau, Bahamas | 3rd | 400 m | 48.90 |
| 2002 | Central American and Caribbean Junior Championships (U-17) | Bridgetown, Barbados | 2nd | 400 m | 47.95 |
| 2002 | Central American and Caribbean Junior Championships (U-17) | Bridgetown, Barbados | 2nd | 4x400 m | 3:19.13 |
| 2002 | World Junior Championships | Kingston, Jamaica | 32nd (h) | 400 m | 48.62 |
| 2003 | CARIFTA Games (U20) | Port of Spain, Trinidad and Tobago | 2nd | 400 m | 47.34 |
| 2003 | CARIFTA Games (U20) | Port of Spain, Trinidad and Tobago | 2nd | 4x400 m | 3:12.46 |
| 2003 | World Youth Championships | Sherbrooke, Canada | 4th | 400 m | 47.61 |
| 2003 | Pan American Games | Santo Domingo, Dominican Republic | 4th | 4x400 m | 3:05.28 |
| 2004 | CARIFTA Games (U20) | Hamilton, Bermuda | 2nd | 400 m | 47.11 |
| 2004 | CARIFTA Games (U20) | Hamilton, Bermuda | 2nd | 4x400 m | 3:12.65 |
| 2004 | Central American and Caribbean Junior Championships (U-20) | Coatzacoalcos, Mexico | 3rd | 200 m | 21.05 (1.2 m/s) |
| 2004 | World Junior Championships | Grosseto, Italy | 3rd | 200m | 21.00 (wind: +0.1 m/s) |
| 2004 | World Junior Championships | Grosseto, Italy | 11th (h) | 4×400m relay | 3:11.33 |
| 2005 | CARIFTA Games | Bacolet, Trinidad and Tobago | 2nd | 400 m | 46.81 |
| 2005 | CARIFTA Games | Bacolet, Trinidad and Tobago | 1st | 4x100 m | 41.05 |
| 2005 | CARIFTA Games | Bacolet, Trinidad and Tobago | 2nd | 4x400 m | 3:10.32 |
| 2006 | NACAC U-23 Championships | Santo Domingo, Dominican Republic | 13th (h) | 400m | 48.21 |
| 2006 | NACAC U-23 Championships | Santo Domingo, Dominican Republic | 7th | 4x400m relay | 3:16.75 |
| 2006 | Central American and Caribbean Games | Cartagena, Colombia | 6th | 4x100 m | 39.92 |
| 2006 | Central American and Caribbean Games | Cartagena, Colombia | 2nd | 4x400 m | 3:02.65 |
