= Darrel Brown =

Trinidad and Tobago sprinter

Personal information
- Nationality: Trinidad and Tobago
- Born: October 11, 1984 (age 41) Arima, Trinidad
- Height: 1.80 m (5 ft 11 in)
- Weight: 79 kg (174 lb)

Sport
- Sport: Running
- Events: 100 metres, 200 metres

Achievements and titles
- Personal bests: 100m: 9.99 (Port-of-Spain 2005); 200m: 20.41 (Port-of-Spain 2001)
Medal record
Men's athletics
Representing Trinidad and Tobago
World Championships
Silver medal – second place	2001 Edmonton	4×100 m relay
Silver medal – second place	2003 Paris	100 m
Silver medal – second place	2005 Helsinki	4×100 m relay
Silver medal – second place	2009 Berlin	4×100 m relay
Pan American Games
Silver medal – second place	2003 Santo Domingo	4×100 m relay
CAC Championships
Gold medal – first place	2005 Nassau	100 m
Gold medal – first place	2005 Nassau	4×100 m relay
Gold medal – first place	2008 Cali	100 m
Silver medal – second place	2003 St. George's	100 m
Silver medal – second place	2011 Mayagüez	4×100 m relay
World Junior Championships
Gold medal – first place	2002 Kingston	100 m
Bronze medal – third place	2002 Kingston	4×100 m relay
Pan American Junior Championships
Silver medal – second place	2001 Santa Fe	100m
Bronze medal – third place	2001 Santa Fe	4x100 m relay
CAC Junior Championships (U20)
Gold medal – first place	2002 Bridgetown	100 m
CARIFTA Games (Junior)
Gold medal – first place	2001 Bridgetown	100 m
Gold medal – first place	2002 Nassau	100 m
Gold medal – first place	2003 Port of Spain	100 m
Silver medal – second place	2003 Port of Spain	4×100 m relay
World Youth Championships
Gold medal – first place	2001 Debrecen	100 m
CAC Junior Championships (U17)
Gold medal – first place	2000 San Juan	100 m
Gold medal – first place	2000 San Juan	200 m
Gold medal – first place	2000 San Juan	4×100 m relay
Silver medal – second place	1998 George Town	100 m
Silver medal – second place	1998 George Town	4×100 m relay
CARIFTA Games (Youth)
Gold medal – first place	1999 Fort-de-France	100 m
Gold medal – first place	1999 Fort-de-France	200 m
Gold medal – first place	2000 St. George's	100 m
Gold medal – first place	2000 St. George's	200 m

Darrel Rondel Brown (born October 11, 1984) is a sprinter from Trinidad and Tobago who specializes in the 100 metres and the 200 metres.

== Career ==
In the beginning of his career, he was awarded the Austin Sealy Trophy for the most outstanding athlete at the CARIFTA Games twice, both in 1999 and 2000, after becoming the first athlete to win back-to-back titles in both the 100 and 200 metres (Youth). After switching to the "junior" age group in 2001, Brown won the 100 metres for three consecutive years (2001–2003), becoming the first athlete ever to do so.

He also performed well in World Youth and Junior Championships. At the 2000 World Junior Championships he finished fourth in both 100 metres and 4 x 100 metres relay. After setting a new World Youth Record over 100 meters at 10.24 on April 14, 2001, he then won gold medals at the 2001 World Youth Championships and the 2002 World Junior Championships. In 2002 he also won a bronze medal in the 4 × 100 metres relay. He also helped win a silver medal in relay at the 2001 World Championships for seniors.

Under the guidance of Henry Rolle Brown ran the 100 m at the 2003 World Championships where he finished second behind Kim Collins. In addition to the silver medal, he set the junior world record of 10.01 seconds in the quarter-finals stage. He also won a relay silver medal at the 2003 Pan American Games, and an individual gold medal at the 2003 Central American and Caribbean Championships.

In June 2005 he set a new personal best with 9.99, thus becoming one of the few athletes to run below 10 seconds. At the 2005 World Championships, Brown was knocked out in the semi-finals with 10.16 seconds. In the relay event, however, he won a silver medal with the Trinidad and Tobago team in a new national record of 38.10 seconds. He later finished fourth at the 2005 World Athletics Final. He also won two gold medals at the 2005 Central American and Caribbean Championships.

Half a year later, at the 2006 Commonwealth Games, he exited in the quarter-finals. The same thing happened at the 2008 Olympic Games. He won another individual gold medal at the 2008 Central American and Caribbean Championships.

He competed at the 2008 Beijing Olympics, reaching the quarter-finals of the 100 metres, but he pulled up in the race, finishing in 10.93 seconds.

At the 2009 World Championships in Berlin, he competed as part of the 4 × 100 m relay for Trinidad and Tobago which finished second behind Jamaica in a national record of 37.62s. Brown was the first leg for team T.T.O. Jamaica's victory was, at that time, a championship record of 37.31s.

== Personal bests ==
Event	Time (seconds)	Venue	Date
55 metres	6.15	Gainesville, Florida, United States	9 February 2003
60 metres	6.59	Fayetteville, Arkansas, United States	14 February 2004
100 metres	9.99	Port of Spain, Trinidad and Tobago	25 June 2005
200 metres	20.41	Port of Spain, Trinidad and Tobago	6 May 2001

- All information taken from IAAF Profile.

Records
Preceded by (United Kingdom) Dwain Chambers	Men's World Junior Record Holder, 100 metres 24 August 2003 – 13 June 2014	Next: (United States) Trayvon Bromell
Preceded by (United States) Deworski Odom	Boys' World Youth Best Holder, 100 metres 14 April 2001 – 23 March 2002	Succeeded by (Nigeria) Tamunosiki Atorudibo
