= Rhonda Watkins =

Trinidadian long jumper

Personal information
- Born: 9 December 1987 (age 38) Port of Spain, Trinidad and Tobago

Sport
- Sport: Track and field
Medal record
Athletics
Representing Trinidad and Tobago
Central American and Caribbean Games
Gold medal – first place	2010 Mayagüez	Long jump
CAC Junior Championships (U20)
Gold medal – first place	2006 Port of Spain	Long jump
Gold medal – first place	2006 Port of Spain	High jump
Gold medal – first place	2004 Coatzacoalcos	Long jump
Gold medal – first place	2004 Coatzacoalcos	High jump
CAC Junior Championships (U17)
Gold medal – first place	2002 Bridgetown	Long jump
Silver medal – second place	2002 Bridgetown	High jump
CARIFTA Games Junior (U20)
Gold medal – first place	2005 Bacolet	Long jump
Gold medal – first place	2005 Bacolet	High jump
Gold medal – first place	2004 Hamilton	Long jump
Silver medal – second place	2004 Hamilton	High jump
CARIFTA Games Youth (U17)
Gold medal – first place	2003 Port of Spain	High jump
Gold medal – first place	2003 Port of Spain	Long jump
Silver medal – second place	2001 Bridgetown	High jump

Rhonda Avion Watkins (born 9 December 1987) is a Trinidad and Tobago long jumper. She is the former national record holder in the event at 6.82m set in 2007 at the Prefontaine Classic.

== Career ==
She won the gold medal at the 2006 World Junior Championships, and competed without reaching the final round at the 2008 Olympic Games. She also finished thirteenth in the high jump at the 2003 World Youth Championships.

She has 6.82 metres in the long jump, achieved in May 2007 in Eugene. In the high jump she has 1.84 metres, achieved in May 2007 in Palo Alto.

As of 2024, she was employed as a primary care sports medicine doctor after completing medical school, a residency in pediatrics, a fellowship in sports medicine, and a master's degree in public health. She has conducted research on preventing injuries, gait retraining and the influence of social media on athletes.

== Achievements ==
Year	Competition	Venue	Position	Event	Notes
Representing Trinidad and Tobago
2001	CARIFTA Games (U17)	Bridgetown, Barbados	2nd	High jump	1.68m
2001	CARIFTA Games (U17)	Bridgetown, Barbados	11th	Long jump	4.31m
2002	CARIFTA Games (U17)	Nassau, Bahamas	5th	High jump	1.60m
2002	CARIFTA Games (U17)	Nassau, Bahamas	4th	Long jump	5.12m
2002	Central American and Caribbean Junior Championships (U-17)	Bridgetown, Barbados	2nd	High jump	1.71m
2002	Central American and Caribbean Junior Championships (U-17)	Bridgetown, Barbados	1st	Long jump	5.56m (-0.4 m/s)
2003	CARIFTA Games (U17)	Port of Spain, Trinidad and Tobago	1st	High jump	1.73m
2003	CARIFTA Games (U17)	Port of Spain, Trinidad and Tobago	1st	Long jump	5.79m (0.8 m/s)
2003	CARIFTA Games (U17)	Port of Spain, Trinidad and Tobago	5th	4 × 100 m relay	47.37s
2003	World Youth Championships	Sherbrooke, Canada	13th	High jump	1.70m
2003	World Youth Championships	Sherbrooke, Canada	7th (q)	Long jump	5.85m (1.0 m/s)
2004	CARIFTA Games (U20)	Hamilton, Bermuda	2nd	High jump	1.76m
2004	CARIFTA Games (U20)	Hamilton, Bermuda	1st	Long jump	6.29m (1.1 m/s)
2004	Central American and Caribbean Junior Championships (U-20)	Coatzacoalcos, Mexico	1st	High jump	1.76m
2004	Central American and Caribbean Junior Championships (U-20)	Coatzacoalcos, Mexico	1st	Long jump	5.85m (-1.7 m/s)
2004	World Junior Championships	Grosseto, Italy	15th (q)	Long jump	5.92 m (-0.2 m/s)
2005	CARIFTA Games (U20)	Bacolet, Trinidad and Tobago	1st	High jump	1.82m
2005	CARIFTA Games (U20)	Bacolet, Trinidad and Tobago	1st	Long jump	6.29m (0.4 m/s)
2005	Central American and Caribbean Championships	Nassau, Bahamas	8th	High jump	1.80 m
2005	Central American and Caribbean Championships	Nassau, Bahamas	9th	Long jump	5.86 m (w)
2006	Central American and Caribbean Junior Championships (U-20)	Port of Spain, Trinidad and Tobago	1st	High jump	1.83m
2006	Central American and Caribbean Junior Championships (U-20)	Port of Spain, Trinidad and Tobago	1st	Long jump	6.56m CR (0.0 m/s)
2006	World Junior Championships	Beijing, China	19th (q)	High jump	1.74 m
2006	World Junior Championships	Beijing, China	1st	Long jump	6.46 m (-0.3 m/s)
2008	Olympic Games	Beijing, China	18th (q)	Long jump	5.88m (0.5 m/s)
2009	Central American and Caribbean Championships	Havana, Cuba	2nd	Long jump	6.47 m
2010	Central American and Caribbean Games	Mayagüez, Puerto Rico	1st	Long jump	6.67 m
