= Carnbee =

Carnbee is a place name for the following:

- Carnbee, Fife, a village and rural parish in Fife, Scotland
- Carnbee, Trinidad and Tobago, a town
