= Ayata Joseph =

Personal information
- Born: 10 August 1985 (age 40) Antigua, Antigua and Barbuda

Sport
- Sport: Track and field
Medal record
Representing Antigua and Barbuda
CAC Junior Championships (U20)
Gold medal – first place	2004 Coatzacoalcos	Triple jump
Bronze medal – third place	2002 Bridgetown	Triple jump
CARIFTA Games Junior (U20)
Gold medal – first place	2004 Hamilton	Triple jump
Gold medal – first place	2003 Port of Spain	Triple jump
Gold medal – first place	2002 Nassau	Triple jump
CARIFTA Games Youth (U17)
Gold medal – first place	2001 Bridgetown	Triple jump
Silver medal – second place	2001 Bridgetown	Long jump

Ayata Joseph (born 10 August 1985) is an Antiguan and Barbudan triple jumper.

== Career ==
His personal best is 16.29 metres, achieved in July 2003 in Bridgetown.

== Achievements ==
Year	Competition	Venue	Position	Event	Notes
Representing Antigua and Barbuda
2001	CARIFTA Games (U17)	Bridgetown, Barbados	1st	Triple jump	13.71m (-2.9 m/s)
2001	CARIFTA Games (U17)	Bridgetown, Barbados	2nd	Long jump	6.77m (0.7 m/s)
2002	CARIFTA Games (U20)	Nassau, Bahamas	1st	Triple jump	15.49m (0.3 m/s)
2002	Commonwealth Games	Manchester, United Kingdom	11th	Triple jump	15.15
2002	Central American and Caribbean Junior Championships (U-20)	Bridgetown, Barbados	3rd	Triple jump	15.56m (0.2 m/s)
2002	World Junior Championships	Kingston, Jamaica	16th (q)	Triple jump	15.28 m (wind: +1.2 m/s)
2003	CARIFTA Games (U20)	Port of Spain, Trinidad and Tobago	1st	Triple jump	16.20m CR (1.0 m/s)
2003	Central American and Caribbean Championships	St. George's, Grenada	3rd	Triple jump	15.94m
2003	Pan American Games	Santo Domingo, Dominican Republic	6th	Triple jump	16.09m
2004	CARIFTA Games (U20)	Hamilton, Bermuda	1st	Triple jump	15.78m w (4.6 m/s)
2004	Central American and Caribbean Junior Championships (U-20)	Coatzacoalcos, Mexico	1st	Triple jump	15.80 (-0.7 m/s)
2004	World Junior Championships	Grosseto, Italy	11th	Triple jump	15.63 m (-0.3 m/s)
2006	Commonwealth Games	Melbourne, Australia	12th	Triple jump	15.48 m
2006	NACAC U-23 Championships	Santo Domingo, Dominican Republic	5th	Triple jump	15.45 m (wind: +0.8 m/s)
2006	Central American and Caribbean Games	Cartagena, Colombia	9th	Triple jump	15.25m (1.2 m/s)
2007	Pan American Games	Rio de Janeiro, Brazil	8th	Triple jump	15.73 m
2009	Central American and Caribbean Championships	Havana, Cuba	4th	Triple jump	15.68 m
2010	Central American and Caribbean Games	Mayagüez, Puerto Rico	11th	Triple jump	14.95 m
