= Latoya Greaves =

Jamaican hurdler (born 1986)

Latoya Greaves (born May 31, 1986) is a Jamaican hurdler. At the 2012 Summer Olympics, she was due to compete in the Women's 100 metres hurdles but did not start due to injury.

Greaves achieved much success in regional age category competitions. After a runner-up finish in the 100 metres hurdles at the 2001 CARIFTA Games (youth section), she returned the year after to win a 100/300 m hurdles double at the 2002 CARIFTA Games. After moving into the junior (under 20) category, she won two straight 100 m hurdles titles at the 2004 CARIFTA Games and 2005 CARIFTA Games.

She was a double relay medallist in the youth section at the 2002 Central American and Caribbean Junior Championships in Athletics, including a championship record in the 4 × 100 m relay alongside Shelly-Ann Fraser, Anneisha McLaughlin and Diane Dietrich. She further established herself individually with a gold medal in the hurdles at the 2005 Pan American Junior Athletics Championships. Her last international age category medal came at the 2008 NACAC Under-23 Championships in Athletics, where she was behind Americans Tiffany Ofili and Kristi Castlin. She competed collegiately for the University of Oklahoma.
