= Sherone Simpson =

Jamaican sprinter (born 1984)

- Simpson in 2008

Personal information
- Born: 12 August 1984 (age 41) Manchester Parish, Jamaica
- Height: 1.63 m (5 ft 4 in)
- Weight: 59 kg (130 lb)

Sport
- Sport: Running
- Event(s): 100 metres, 200 metres, 400 metres
- Club: MVP
Medal record
Women's Athletics
Representing Jamaica
Olympic Games
Gold medal – first place	2004 Athens	4 × 100 m relay
Silver medal – second place	2008 Beijing	100 m
Silver medal – second place	2012 London	4 × 100 m relay
World Championships
Gold medal – first place	2015 Beijing	4 × 100 m relay
Silver medal – second place	2005 Helsinki	4 × 100 m relay
Silver medal – second place	2011 Daegu	4 × 100 m relay
World Relays
Silver medal – second place	2019 Yokohama	4 × 100 m relay
Commonwealth Games
Gold medal – first place	2006 Melbourne	200 m
Gold medal – first place	2006 Melbourne	4 × 100 m
Pan American Games
Gold medal – first place	2015 Toronto	100 m
Silver medal – second place	2015 Toronto	4 × 100 m relay
Continental Cup
Gold medal – first place	2006 Athens	100 m
Gold medal – first place	2006 Athens	4 × 100 m
Central American and Caribbean Games
Gold medal – first place	2018 Barranquilla	4 × 100 m relay
Pan American Junior Championships
Silver medal – second place	2003 Bridgetown	100 m
Silver medal – second place	2003 Bridgetown	4 × 100 m relay
CAC Junior Championships (U20)
Gold medal – first place	2002 Bridgetown	4 × 100 m relay
Silver medal – second place	2002 Bridgetown	100 m
CARIFTA Games Junior (U20)
Gold medal – first place	2003 Port of Spain	4 × 100 m relay
Silver medal – second place	2003 Port of Spain	100 m

Sherone Simpson (born 12 August 1984) is a retired Jamaican track and field sprint athlete. She is a gold medalist in the 4 × 100 m relay from the 2004 Olympics and silver medalist in 2005 World Championships and now is the silver medalist in the individual event at the 2008 Summer Olympics, after she tied for second with Kerron Stewart in a photo finish.

On 14 July 2013, Simpson announced that she had tested positive for the drug oxilofrine. In April 2014, the Jamaica Anti-Doping Commission announced that she would be suspended for 18 months over doping charges, expiring in December that year. However, after appealing to the Court of Arbitration for Sport (CAS), the suspension was lifted on 14 July 2014.

Simpson won a lawsuit against the Supplement company for failing to disclose the banned stimulant.

== Biography ==
With her personal best of 10.82 seconds in the 100 m, Simpson is ranked 7th among Jamaican women, behind Elaine Thompson-Herah (10.54), Shelly-Ann Fraser-Pryce (10.60), Shericka Jackson (10.65), Merlene Ottey (10.74), Kerron Stewart (10.75), and Veronica Campbell Brown (10.76). Simpson's 200 m personal best of 22.00 seconds ranks her 9th among Jamaican women behind Elaine Thompson-Herah, Merlene Ottey, Grace Jackson, Veronica Campbell-Brown, Juliet Cuthbert, Shelly-Ann Fraser-Pryce, Shericka Jackson and Kerron Stewart. She has run this time on two occasions. Simpson is coached by Stephen Francis in Kingston, Jamaica, where she attends the University of Technology. She is also a graduate of Manchester High.

Simpson won the gold medal in the women's 200 m at the 2006 Commonwealth Games, beating Olympic champion Veronica Campbell and completing a Jamaican sweep of 100–200 m gold medals. Jamaica also won both sprint hurdles gold medals.

At the 2008 Summer Olympics in Beijing she competed at the 100 m sprint. In her first round heat she placed third behind Yevgeniya Polyakova and Jade Bailey in a time of 11.48 to advance to the second round. There she improved her time to 11.02 seconds to win her heat in front of Muna Lee and Chandra Sturrup. With 11.11 seconds in her semi final race she placed fourth and earned her spot in the Olympic final. In a remarkable race with fellow Jamaican Shelly-Ann Fraser taking the gold, Simpson and Kerron Stewart both finished in 10.98 seconds to share the silver medal and to complete the Jamaican sweep. Together with Fraser, Stewart, Sheri-Ann Brooks, Aleen Bailey and Veronica Campbell-Brown she also took part in the 4 × 100 m relay. In their first round heat (without Simpson and Stewart) they placed first in front of Russia, Germany and China. Their time of 42.24 seconds was the first time overall out of sixteen participating nations. With this result they qualified for the final, in which they replaced Brooks and Bailey with Simpson and Stewart. Eventually they did not finish their race, due to a mistake in the baton exchange.

=== Anti-doping rule violation ===
On 14 July 2013, Simpson informed that a urine sample she supplied after competing in the Jamaican national championships in June 2013 had tested positive for the banned stimulant oxilofrine, along with Asafa Powell. On 10 April 2014, both athletes received an 18-month suspension from competing, which was set to expire in December that year. However, after appealing to the Court of Arbitration for Sport (CAS), both athletes' suspensions were reduced to six months expiring in December 2014. CAS stated that: "They put forward that the offence committed was minor because it was caused by contamination of the food supplement Epiphany D1 by the banned substance oxilofrine.

Simpson won a lawsuit against the Supplement company for failing to disclose the banned stimulant.

== Personal bests ==
Event	Time	Wind	Place	Date
100 m	10.82	−0.7	Kingston, Jamaica	24 June 2006
200 m	22.00	−0.3	Stockholm, Sweden	25 July 2006
200 m	22.00	+1.3	Kingston, Jamaica	25 June 2006
400 m	51.25		Kingston, Jamaica	22 March 2008

Sporting positions
Preceded by (United States) Allyson Felix	Women's 200 m Best Year Performance; 2005	Succeeded by (United States) Allyson Felix
