= 2004 World Junior Championships in Athletics – Men's 200 metres =

The men's 200 metres event at the 2004 World Junior Championships in Athletics was held in Grosseto, Italy, at Stadio Olimpico Carlo Zecchini on 15 and 16 July.

== Medalists ==
Gold	Andrew Howe; Italy
Silver	Leigh Julius; South Africa
Bronze	Jamil James; Trinidad and Tobago

== Results ==
=== Final ===
16 July
Wind: +0.1 m/s

Rank	Name	Nationality	Time	Notes
1st place, gold medalist(s)	Andrew Howe	Italy	20.28	
2nd place, silver medalist(s)	Leigh Julius	South Africa	20.88	
3rd place, bronze medalist(s)	Jamil James	Trinidad and Tobago	21.00	
4	Hank Palmer	Canada	21.13	
5	Julian Thomas	United Kingdom	21.13	
6	Rikki Fifton	United Kingdom	21.17	
7	Samuel Adade	Ghana	21.20	
8	Daniel Grueso	Colombia	21.45	

=== Semifinals ===
15 July

==== Semifinal 1 ====
Wind: +1.6 m/s

Rank	Name	Nationality	Time	Notes
1	Andrew Howe	Italy	20.72	Q
2	Hank Palmer	Canada	20.81	Q
3	Daniel Grueso	Colombia	21.07	q
4	Visa Hongisto	Finland	21.23	
5	Florian Rentz	Germany	21.29	
6	Jared Connaughton	Canada	21.42	
7	Yordan Ilinov	Bulgaria	21.51	
8	Graeme Read	New Zealand	21.63	

==== Semifinal 2 ====
Wind: +0.3 m/s

Rank	Name	Nationality	Time	Notes
1	Leigh Julius	South Africa	20.84	Q
2	Jamil James	Trinidad and Tobago	20.97	Q
3	Marcus Duncan	Trinidad and Tobago	21.23	
4	Nesta Carter	Jamaica	21.24	
5	Hiroyuki Noda	Japan	21.24	
6	Mohamed Al-Rasheedi	Bahrain	21.34	
7	Marcus Pugh	United States	21.61	
8	José Eduardo Acevedo	Venezuela	21.66	

==== Semifinal 3 ====
Wind: +1.0 m/s

Rank	Name	Nationality	Time	Notes
1	Julian Thomas	United Kingdom	20.86	Q
2	Rikki Fifton	United Kingdom	20.90	Q
3	Samuel Adade	Ghana	21.07	q
4	Ivan Teplykh	Russia	21.12	
5	Martial Mbandjock	France	21.28	
6	Jacobi Mitchell	Bahamas	21.41	
7	Anton Korobets	Russia	21.57	
	Carey LaCour	United States	DNF	

=== Heats ===
15 July

==== Heat 1 ====
Wind: +2.3 m/s

Rank	Name	Nationality	Time	Notes
1	Julian Thomas	United Kingdom	20.93 w	Q
2	Hiroyuki Noda	Japan	21.00 w	Q
3	Jacobi Mitchell	Bahamas	21.34 w	Q
4	Jared Connaughton	Canada	21.46 w	q
5	Musa Al-Housaoui	Saudi Arabia	21.57 w	
6	Marco Cribari	Switzerland	21.73 w	
7	Luke Mansfield	Australia	25.40 w	

==== Heat 2 ====
Wind: +2.5 m/s

Rank	Name	Nationality	Time	Notes
1	Mohamed Al-Rasheedi	Bahrain	21.17 w	Q
2	Martial Mbandjock	France	21.17 w	Q
3	Visa Hongisto	Finland	21.20 w	Q
4	Daniel Grueso	Colombia	21.27 w	q
5	Samuel Adade	Ghana	21.32 w	q
6	José Eduardo Acevedo	Venezuela	21.45 w	q
7	Mariano Jiménez	Argentina	21.77 w	
8	Imran Imran Ali	Pakistan	21.85 w	

==== Heat 3 ====
Wind: +1.2 m/s

Rank	Name	Nationality	Time	Notes
1	Florian Rentz	Germany	21.19	Q
2	Marcus Duncan	Trinidad and Tobago	21.20	Q
3	Anton Korobets	Russia	21.26	Q
4	Nesta Carter	Jamaica	21.28	q
5	Raymond Diogo	Uganda	21.81	
6	Philip Stanek	Austria	22.30	
7	Salim Al-Qaifi	Yemen	22.95	
	Grafton Ifill	Bahamas	DQ	IAAF rule 162.7

==== Heat 4 ====
Wind: +0.9 m/s

Rank	Name	Nationality	Time	Notes
1	Andrew Howe	Italy	20.86	Q
2	Carey LaCour	United States	21.18	Q
3	Jamil James	Trinidad and Tobago	21.43	Q
4	Yuichi Shokawa	Japan	21.47	
5	Jean Du Randt	South Africa	21.48	
6	Jorge Sena	Brazil	21.57	
7	Said Hassani	France	21.91	

==== Heat 5 ====
Wind: +1.3 m/s

Rank	Name	Nationality	Time	Notes
1	Leigh Julius	South Africa	20.91	Q
2	Graeme Read	New Zealand	21.43	Q
3	Yordan Ilinov	Bulgaria	21.46	Q
4	Othman Raqib	Morocco	21.56	
5	Lim Jae-Yoel	South Korea	21.58	
6	Félix Martínez	Puerto Rico	21.72	
7	Moise Kossi	Central African Republic	23.26	
	Paulo Orlando	Brazil	DNF	

==== Heat 6 ====
Wind: +1.9 m/s

Rank	Name	Nationality	Time	Notes
1	Rikki Fifton	United Kingdom	20.99	Q
2	Hank Palmer	Canada	20.99	Q
3	Marcus Pugh	United States	21.20	Q
4	Ivan Teplykh	Russia	21.32	q
5	Matt Davies	Australia	21.55	
6	Juma Al-Jabri	Oman	21.70	
7	Todd Mansfield	New Zealand	21.87	
8	Tiarison Manandaza	Madagascar	22.05	

== Participation ==
According to an unofficial count, 46 athletes from 34 countries participated in the event.

- Argentina (1)
- Australia (2)
- Austria (1)
- Bahamas (2)
- Bahrain (1)
- Brazil (2)
- Bulgaria (1)
- Canada (2)
- Central African Republic (1)
- Colombia (1)
- Finland (1)
- France (2)
- Germany (1)
- Ghana (1)
- Italy (1)
- Jamaica (1)
- Japan (2)
- Madagascar (1)
- Morocco (1)
- New Zealand (2)
- Oman (1)
- Pakistan (1)
- Puerto Rico (1)
- Russia (2)
- Saudi Arabia (1)
- South Africa (2)
- South Korea (1)
- Switzerland (1)
- Trinidad and Tobago (2)
- Uganda (1)
- United Kingdom (2)
- United States (2)
- Venezuela (1)
- Yemen (1)
