= Shandria Brown =

Bahamian sprinter

Personal information
- Born: 7 July 1983 (age 43)

Sport
- Sport: Track and field
Medal record
Athletics
Representing Bahamas
Central American and Caribbean Games
| Bronze medal – third place | 2006 Cartagena | 4x100m relay |
Central American and Caribbean Championships in Athletics
| Gold medal – first place | 2003 St.George's | 4x100 m relay |
CARIFTA Games Junior (U20)
| Gold medal – first place | 2002 Nassau | 100 m |
| Gold medal – first place | 2002 Nassau | 200 m |
CARIFTA Games Youth (U17)
| Silver medal – second place | 1998 Port of Spain | Long jump |

Shandria Brown (born 7 July 1983) is a Bahamian sprinter who specializes in the 200 metres. Her personal best time is 23.27 seconds, achieved in May 2003 in Edwardsville, Illinois.

She was coached by Rickey Moxey in L. N. Coakley High School, Exuma Bahamas, where she received a track scholarship.

She finished fourth in 4 x 100 metres relay at the 2004 Summer Olympics, with teammates Tamicka Clarke, Chandra Sturrup and Debbie Ferguson.
