= Cleveland Forde =

Guyanese middle-distance runner (born 1985)

Personal information
- Nationality: Guyanese
- Born: April 3, 1985 (age 41) Georgetown, Guyana

Sport
- Sport: Track
- Events: 800 metres, 1500 metres, 5000 metres

Achievements and titles
- Personal bests: 800 metres: 1:51.31; 1500 metres: 3:44.23; 5000 metres: 14:07.08

Cleveland Forde (born April 3, 1985), is a Guyanese track runner who specialized in various middle-distance and long-distance disciplines. Forde holds national records for Guyana in the 1500 metres and 5000 metres disciplines. He represented his country at the World Championships in Athletics in 2007, the IAAF World Cross Country Championships in 2007 and 2008, and the 2008 IAAF World Half Marathon Championships.

He has also run for Guyana at the Commonwealth Games (2006, 2010) and the Pan American Games (2007). His sole senior international medal is a bronze at the 2010 Central American and Caribbean Games. He won several regional medals in his youth at the CARIFTA Games.

== Running career ==
=== Youth and junior career ===
Forde made his first appearance in major international competition at the 2001 World Youth Championships in Athletics, although he was the youngest in his 3000 metres heat and was last by a margin of fifty seconds.

His first international medal came at the 2002 CARIFTA Games where he won the gold medal in the 5000 metres. He would go on to compete at the 2003 and 2004 CARIFTA Games, both times finishing in first place in the 5000 m (he also managed fourth, then second in the 1500 m). He also won bronze medals in both the 5000 m and 10,000 metres at the 2002 Central American and Caribbean Junior Championships in Athletics.

He also ran in those events at the 2002 South American Junior Championships in Athletics, but at this higher-level competition was seventh in the 5000 m and failed to finish the 10,000 m. He was the fourth placer in the 5000 m and 10,000 m at the 2003 South American Junior Championships in Athletics, then came ninth in the 2003 Pan American Junior Athletics Championships later that year. Forde was chosen to compete at the 2004 World Junior Championships in Athletics but ultimately did not participate.

=== Senior career ===
Forde set a Guyanese national record in the 5000 m when he finished first in 14:07.08 minutes at the 2006 South American Under-23 Championships in Athletics. He came fifteenth in the 5000 m at the 2006 Commonwealth Games.

He made his global debut as a senior athlete in 2007, beginning with the 2007 IAAF World Cross Country Championships, at which he placed 97th overall. He later ran in the 5000 m at the 2007 World Championships in Athletics, but was second-to-last place overall and over a minute slower than the next fastest runner. He gave similar performances at that year's 2007 Pan American Games in Rio de Janeiro, finishing tenth in the 10,000 m and eleventh in the 5000 m. Two more top level events followed the year after: at the 2008 IAAF World Cross Country Championships he was further down the order in 154th place, but managed to set a half marathon best of 1:10:20 hours at the 2008 IAAF World Half Marathon Championships, where he was 58th.

Forde ran a 5000 m personal best of 14:08.95 minutes at the 2010 Central American and Caribbean Games, taking the bronze medal in the process – his first as a senior athlete. He also set a 1500 m best of 3:50.47 minutes for sixth place. Forde ran his fastest 1500 m race in 3:44.23 minutes in the men's 1500-metre race at the 2010 Commonwealth Games, setting a national records and barely missing a berth in the final round. He was slower in the 5000 m Commonwealth race, coming 18th.

His form was not as good at the 2011 Central American and Caribbean Championships in Athletics, at which he was seventh place in the 1500 m and fourth in the 5000 m. He ceased track competitions after this point and began competing in lower-level road races in his region.
