= Joel Phillip =

Joel Phillip OLY
Personal information
- Full name: Joel Japheth Phillip
- Nationality: Grenada
- Born: 12 September 1987 (age 38) St. George's, Grenada
- Height: 1.88 m (6 ft 2 in)
- Weight: 75 kg (165 lb)

Sport
- Country: Grenada
- Sport: Athletics
- Event: Sprint
- College team: Arizona State Sun Devils (USA)

Achievements and titles
- Olympic finals: 2008
- Personal best: 400 m: 45.29 s (2008)

Joel Japheth Phillip (born September 12, 1987 in St. George's) is a retired Grenadian sprinter, who specialized in the 400 metres. He set a personal best time of 45.29 seconds, by finishing ninth at the 2008 Pac-10 Conference Championships in Tempe, Arizona.

Phillip represented Grenada at the 2008 Summer Olympics in Beijing, where he competed for the men's 400 metres, along with his teammate Alleyne Francique. He ran in the sixth heat against seven other athletes, including Trinidad and Tobago's Renny Quow and Bahamas' Michael Mathieu. He finished the race in sixth place by sixteen hundredths of a second (0.16) ahead of Puerto Rico's Félix Martínez, with a time of 46.30 seconds. Phillip, however, failed to advance into the semi-finals, as he placed thirty-ninth overall, and was ranked farther below three mandatory slots for the next round.

Phillip was a member of the track and field team for the Arizona State Sun Devils, and a graduate of recreation and exercise management at the Arizona State University in Tempe.

After leaving competition Joel went on to coach at Lehman College and then at the University of the District of Columbia.

== Achievements ==
| Year | Competition | Venue | Position | Event | Notes |
Representing Grenada
| 2002 | CARIFTA Games (U-17) | Nassau, Bahamas | 5th | High Jump | 1.85m |
| 2002 | CARIFTA Games (U-17) | Nassau, Bahamas | 3rd | 4x400m Relay | 3:27.32 |
| 2003 | CARIFTA Games (U-17) | Port of Spain, Trinidad and Tobago | 1st | Long Jump | 6.98 |
| 2003 | CARIFTA Games (U-17) | Port of Spain, Trinidad and Tobago | 3rd | Triple Jump | 14.06 (-0.9 m/s) |
| 2003 | CARIFTA Games (U-17) | Port of Spain, Trinidad and Tobago | 3rd | High Jump | 1.95 |
| 2003 | CARIFTA Games (U-17) | Port of Spain, Trinidad and Tobago | 4th | 4x100m Relay | 42.59 |
| 2003 | CARIFTA Games (U-17) | Port of Spain, Trinidad and Tobago | 5th | 4x400m Relay | 3:26.57 |
| 2004 | CARIFTA Games (U-20) | Hamilton, Bermuda | 2nd | Heptathlon | 4660 |
| 2005 | CARIFTA Games (U-20) | Bacolet, Trinidad and Tobago | 1st | Heptathlon | 4803 |
| 2008 | Summer Olympics | Beijing, China | 6th h | 400m | 46.30 |
