= Tyrone Sawyer =

Bahamian sprinter

Personal information
- Born: February 22, 1986 (age 40)
Medal record
Athletics
Representing Bahamas
CAC Junior Championships (U20)
Bronze medal – third place	2004 Coatzacoalcos	4x100 m relay
CAC Junior Championships (U17)
Bronze medal – third place	2002 Bridgetown	100 m
CARIFTA Games Junior (U20)
Bronze medal – third place	2003 Port of Spain	4x100 m relay
Bronze medal – third place	2003 Port of Spain	4x400 m relay
CARIFTA Games Junior (U17)
Silver medal – second place	2002 Nassau	4x100 m relay
Silver medal – second place	2002 Nassau	4x400 m relay

Tyrone Sawyer II (born February 22, 1986) is a retired Bahamian sprinter from Nassau, Bahamas who competed in the 100m and 200m and 400m. He attended St. John's College Highs School before competing for University of New Haven. After retirement, Sawyer graduated with his Masters of Business Administration from Nova Southeastern University. He is now an author and businessman who owns an international education and entertainment company named Jemima's Playhouse. The company was named after his wife Jemima Sawyer.

Sawyer competed at the 2004 World Junior Championships in Athletics in Grosseto, Italy.

== Personal bests ==
Event	Time	Venue	Date
100 m	10.55	Nassau, Bahamas	25 FEB 2005
200 m	22.62 (+0.1)	Nassau, Bahamas	01 APR 2002
60 m	6.85	New Haven, Connecticut	06 FEB 2009
