= Andretti Bain =

Bahamian sprinter (born 1985)

Personal information
- Born: 1 December 1985 (age 40) Nassau, Bahamas

Sport
- Sport: Track and field
Medal record
Representing Bahamas
Olympic Games
| Silver medal – second place | 2008 Beijing | 4x400 m relay |
Commonwealth Games
| Silver medal – second place | 2014 Glasgow | 4 × 400 m relay |
Pan American Games
| Gold medal – first place | 2007 Rio de Janeiro | 4x400 m relay |
Central American and Caribbean Games
| Silver medal – second place | 2010 Mayaguez | 4x400 m relay |
CAC Championships
| Silver medal – second place | 2008 Cali | 4×400 m relay |
CAC Junior Championships (U20)
| Silver medal – second place | 2002 Bridgetown | 4x400 m relay |
| Silver medal – second place | 2004 Coatzacoalcos | 400 m |
CARIFTA Games Junior (U20)
| Silver medal – second place | 2002 Nassau | 4x400 m relay |
| Bronze medal – third place | 2003 Port of Spain | 400 m |
| Bronze medal – third place | 2003 Port of Spain | 400 m hurdles |
| Bronze medal – third place | 2003 Port of Spain | 4x400 m relay |
| Bronze medal – third place | 2004 Hamilton | 4x400 m relay |
CARIFTA Games Youth (U17)
| Bronze medal – third place | 2001 Bridgetown | 400 m hurdles |

Andretti "Dretti" Bain (born 1 December 1985) is a Bahamian sprinter who specializes in the 400 metres. He was born in Nassau.

Bain finished fifth in 4 x 400 metres relay at the 2004 World Indoor Championships, together with teammates Chris Brown, Timothy Munnings and Dennis Darling.

He was the NCAA Indoor Champion at 400m in 2008 for Oral Roberts University, in Tulsa, Oklahoma. He set an indoor personal best of 46.02 in the preliminary round.

Bain also won the 2008 NCAA Outdoor 400m Championship in 44.62 over USC's Lionel Larry, for Oral Roberts University.

Was part of the Bahamas' silver medal-winning team in the men's 4 × 400 m relay at the 2008 Beijing Olympics. Bain graduated from Oral Roberts University.
