= Aaron Cleare =

Bahamian athlete

Medal record

Athletics

Representing Bahamas

CARIFTA Games Junior (U20)
Silver medal – second place	2002 Nassau	4x400 m relay

Aaron Cleare (born 31 January 1983) is a Bahamian athlete who specializes in the 400 metres. He was a member of the Bahamian 4 x 400 metres relay team that finished 6th in the 2004 Olympics. He went to college at Dickinson State University, located in Dickinson, North Dakota.
