= Alain Bailey =

Jamaican long jumper

Alain Bailey (born 14 August 1987) is a Jamaican long jumper.

Bailey joined the Arkansas Razorbacks in 2007 and received All American honours on three occasions. He was seventh in the long jump at the outdoor NCAA Championships in 2009 and went on to win the event at the Jamaican Championships later that season. This gained him qualification into the 2009 World Championships in Athletics.

Bailey competed at the World Championship long jump competition, but did not manage to reach the final. His personal best jump is 8.35 metres, achieved in May 2010 in Knoxville, Tennessee. In March 2010, Bailey won the long jump at the NCAA Division I Indoor Track and Field Championships.

== International competitions ==
Year	Competition	Venue	Position	Event	Notes
Representing Jamaica
2002	CARIFTA Games (U17)	Nassau, Bahamas	2nd	High jump	1.95 m
2002	Central American and Caribbean Junior Championships (U-17)	Bridgetown, Barbados	1st	High jump	2.02 m
2002	Central American and Caribbean Junior Championships (U-17)	Bridgetown, Barbados	1st	Long jump	6.77 m (0.8 m/s)
2003	CARIFTA Games (U17)	Port of Spain, Trinidad and Tobago	1st	High jump	2.03 m
2003	CARIFTA Games (U17)	Port of Spain, Trinidad and Tobago	2nd	Long jump	6.92 m (0.3 m/s)
2004	CARIFTA Games (U20)	Hamilton, Bermuda	7th	High jump	1.95 m
2004	CARIFTA Games (U20)	Hamilton, Bermuda	3rd	Long jump	7.47 m w (3.3 m/s)
2005	CARIFTA Games (U20)	Bacolet, Trinidad and Tobago	4th	High jump	2.05 m
2005	CARIFTA Games (U20)	Bacolet, Trinidad and Tobago	1st	Triple jump	14.60 m (1.9 m/s)
2006	CARIFTA Games (U-20)	Les Abymes, Guadeloupe	5th	High jump	2.00 m
2006	CARIFTA Games (U-20)	Les Abymes, Guadeloupe	3rd	Long jump	7.36 m (0.0 m/s)
2006	Central American and Caribbean Junior Championships (U-20)	Port of Spain, Trinidad and Tobago	1st	Long jump	7.68 m
2009	World Championships	Berlin, Germany	22nd	Long jump	7.88 m
