= 2002 CARIFTA Games =

XXXI CARIFTA Games
- Dates: March 30-April 1
- Host city: Nassau, Bahamas (The Bahamas)
- Venue: Robinson National Stadium
- Level: Junior and Youth
- Events: 66 (35 junior (incl. 3 open), 31 youth)
- Participation: about 346 (208 junior, 138 youth) athletes from about 21 nations
- Records set: 13 games records

The 31st CARIFTA Games was held in the Robinson National Stadium in Nassau, Bahamas, on March 30-April 1, 2002. A report on the results was given.

== Participation (unofficial) ==
Detailed result lists can be found on the CFPI and on the "World Junior Athletics History" website. An unofficial count yields the number of about 346 athletes (208 junior (under-20) and 138 youth (under-17)) from about 21 countries: Antigua and Barbuda (4), Aruba (3), Bahamas (67), Barbados (26), Belize (1), Bermuda (12), British Virgin Islands (5), Cayman Islands (16), French Guiana (4), Grenada (30), Guadeloupe (17), Guyana (3), Jamaica (64), Martinique (20), Netherlands Antilles (7), Saint Kitts and Nevis (3), Saint Lucia (9), Saint Vincent and the Grenadines (1), Trinidad and Tobago (36), Turks and Caicos Islands (13), US Virgin Islands (5).

== Records ==
A total of 13 games records were set.

In the boys' U-20 category, Darrel Brown from Trinidad and Tobago again set a new games record finishing the 100 metres in 10.22s (wind: 0.9 m/s). Jamaican Greg Little finished the 400 metres hurdles in 50.85s.

In the girls' U-20 category, Shaunette Davidson from Jamaica jumped 1.84m high. As in the year 2000, Claudia Villeneuve from Martinique set new records in shot put (15.75m) and discus throw (53.47m).

In the boys' U-17 category, Usain Bolt from Jamaica set three new records of 21.12s (wind: -0.5 m/s) in 200 metres, 47.33s in 400 metres, and together with the Jamaican 4x400 metres relay team in 3:18.88. Further records were set by James Baird from Antigua and Barbuda in 9:10.97 in the 3000 metres event, and by Matthew Palmer from Jamaica in 13.14s (wind: -0.7 m/s) in 100 metres hurdles.

Finally, in the girls' U-20 category, Anneisha McLaughlin from Jamaica set two new records: in a 200 metres heat, she finished in 23.03 seconds (wind: -1.8 m/s), and as part of the Jamaican 4x400 metres team achieving 3:44.18. LaToya Heath from Jamaica jumped 11.58 (wind: 0.8 m/s) in triple jump.

== Austin Sealy Award ==
The Austin Sealy Trophy for the most outstanding athlete of the games was awarded to Anneisha McLaughlin from Jamaica. She won 3 gold medals (100m, 200m, and 4 × 400 m relay) in the youth (U-17) category.

== Medal summary ==
Medal winners are published by category: Boys under 20 (Junior), Girls under 20 (Junior), Boys under 17 (Youth), and Girls under 17 (Youth). Complete results can be found on the CFPI and the "World Junior Athletics History" website.

=== Boys under 20 (Junior) ===
Event	Gold		Silver		Bronze	
100 metres (0.9 m/s)	Darrel Brown (TRI)	10.22 CR	Grafton Ifill (BAH)	10.60	Yhann Plummer (JAM)	10.62
200 metres (-1.3 m/s)	Marc Burns (TRI)	20.8	Grafton Ifill (BAH)	21.1	Yhann Plummer (JAM)	21.3
400 metres	Jermaine Gonzales (JAM)	46.88	Melville Rogers (SKN)	47.24	Yohann Nègre (GLP)	47.78
800 metres	Simeon Bovell (TRI)	1:51.04	Tai Payne (GUY)	1:51.33	Jermaine Myers (JAM)	1:51.47
1500 metres	Shaun Smith (JAM)	3:55.41	Jermaine Myers (JAM)	3:55.71	Kendell Simon (GRN)	3:56.64
5000 metres	Cleveland Forde (GUY)	15:48.03	Alex Sawyer (BAH)	15:48.81	Kendell Simon (GRN)	15:49.26
110 metres hurdles (0.5 m/s)	Shamar Sands (BAH)	14.15	Dwayne Robinson (JAM)	14.22	Richard Alleyne (BAR)	14.87
400 metres hurdles	Greg Little (JAM)	50.85 CR	Shane Charles (GRN)	52.08	Patrick Lee (JAM)	52.10
High jump	Damon Thompson (BAR)	2.18	Germaine Mason (JAM)	2.16	Garvin Peters (GRN)	2.08
Pole vault	Anthony Pratt (BAH)	3.40	Adrian Griffith (BAH)	3.00		
Long jump	Sedain McDonald (JAM)	7.49 (0.1 m/s)	David Alerte (MTQ)	7.48 (0.6 m/s)	Damion Young (JAM)	7.38 (0.6 m/s)
Triple jump	Ayata Joseph (ATG)	15.49 (0.3 m/s)	Cédric Bergoz (MTQ)	15.09 (0.1 m/s)	Daniel Mayaud (MTQ)	15.04 (0.1 m/s)
Shot put	Kimani Kirton (JAM)	15.38	Shamir Thomas (GRN)	14.85	Reggie Sands (BAH)	13.24
Discus throw	Shamir Thomas (GRN)	48.80	Alleyne Lett (GRN)	47.00	Michael Letterlough (CAY)	44.41
Javelin throw	Jamal Forde (BAR)	60.68	Christophe Marie-Nelly (MTQ)	60.29	Solomon John (TRI)	60.28
Heptathlon	Alleyne Lett (GRN)	4920w	Alan Mitchell (TRI)	4785	Adrian Griffith (BAH)	4594
4 x 100 metres relay	Trinidad and Tobago	40.48	Jamaica	40.58	Bahamas	40.91
4 x 400 metres relay	Jamaica; Jermaine Gonzales; Kimani Williams; Jermaine Myers; Greg Little	3:09.21	Bahamas; Drameko Bridgewater; Andretti Bain; Aaron Cleare; Carl Rolle	3:12.97	Trinidad and Tobago; Kevin Straker; Asim James; Simeon Bovell; Joel Pile	3:13.37

: Open event for both junior and youth athletes.

=== Girls under 20 (Junior) ===
Event	Gold		Silver		Bronze	
100 metres (0.6 m/s)	Shandria Brown (BAH)	11.49	Kerron Stewart (JAM)	11.61	Wanda Hutson (TRI)	11.81
200 metres (-1.5 m/s)	Shandria Brown (BAH)	23.56	Tracy-Ann Rowe (JAM)	23.98	Melaine Walker (JAM)	24.50
400 metres	Sheryl Morgan (JAM)	52.42	Kishara George (GRN)	54.87	Shanna-Kay Campbell (JAM)	55.01
800 metres	Carlene Robinson (JAM)	2:09.03	Kayann Thompson (JAM)	2:09.81	Tiffany Eatherley (BER)	2:16.58
1500 metres	Janill Williams (ATG)	4:48.15	Kayann Thompson (JAM)	4:51.41	Lorain McKenzie (JAM)	4:54.33
3000 metres	Janill Williams (ATG)	10:04.55	Lorain McKenzie (JAM)	10:14.70	Pilar McShine (TRI)	10:28.57
100 metres hurdles (0.1 m/s)	Florence Vermal (MTQ)	14.02	Nadina Marsh (JAM)	14.21	Véronique Marie-Joseph (MTQ)	14.42
400 metres hurdles	Melaine Walker (JAM)	58.35	Camile Robinson (JAM)	60.67	Jackie-Ann Morain (GRN)	62.34
High jump	Shaunette Davidson (JAM)	1.84 CR	Levern Spencer (LCA)	1.82	Peaches Roach (JAM)	1.82
Long jump	Zindzi Swan (BER)	6.01w (2.9 m/s)	Charisse Bacchus (TRI)	5.84 (0.9 m/s)	Nadina Marsh (JAM)	5.77 (-0.1 m/s)
Triple jump	Desiree Crichlow (BAR)	12.81 (-0.1 m/s)	Zelica Montout (GLP)	12.69 (-2.6 m/s)	Jessica Maussion (GLP)	12.44 (0.1 m/s)
Shot put	Claudia Villeneuve (MTQ)	15.75 CR	Marie-Patrice Calabre (GLP)	14.19	Kesheila Reid (JAM)	13.20
Discus throw	Claudia Villeneuve (MTQ)	53.47 CR	Aymara Albury (BAH)	42.10	Shernelle Nicholls (BAR)	41.60
Javelin throw	Natalie Dixon (TRI)	45.77	Erma Gene Evans (LCA)	44.26	Melinda Bastian (BAH)	39.99
Pentathlon	Charisse Bacchus (TRI)	3455w	Peta-Gaye Beckford (JAM)	3395	Astra Curry (BAH)	3290
4 x 100 metres relay	Jamaica	44.91	Bahamas	45.36	Barbados	45.76
4 x 400 metres relay	Jamaica; Carlene Robinson; Camille Robinson; Shauna-Kay Campbell; Sheryl Morgan	3:37.52	Barbados; Sharon Larrier; Genna Williams; Lian Lucas; Lyn-Marie Cox	3:49.63	Bahamas; Crystal Strachan; Sidell Ingraham; Petra McDonald; Shantell Newbold	3:56.31

: Open event for both junior and youth athletes.

=== Boys under 17 (Youth) ===
Event	Gold		Silver		Bronze	
100 metres (0.9 m/s)	Matthew Palmer (JAM)	10.99	Jaheed Smith (BIZ)	11.08	Benjamin Resid (GLP)	11.09
200 metres (-0.5 m/s)	Usain Bolt (JAM)	21.12 CR	Andre Wellington (JAM)	21.94	Jamil James (TRI)	22.02
400 metres	Usain Bolt (JAM)	47.33 CR	Jacobi Mitchell (BAH)	48.87	Jamil James (TRI)	48.90
800 metres	Kamade Rolle (BAH)	1:58.81	Davian Parker (JAM)	1:58.86	Ethwinson Luis (AHO)	1:59.20
1500 metres	James Baird (ATG)	4:05.27	Ryan Ross (ATG)	4:12.44	Ethwinson Luis (AHO)	4:14.19
3000 metres	James Baird (ATG)	9:10.97 CR	Shawn Adams (LCA)	9:31.17	Neilon Joseph (GRN)	9:43.34
100 metres hurdles (-0.7 m/s)	Matthew Palmer (JAM)	13.14 CR	Damien Farmer (BAR)	13.57	Delano Coakley (BAH)	14.22
400 metres hurdles	Josef Robertson (JAM)	54.61	Markino Buckley (JAM)	55.33	Damien Farmer (BAR)	55.67
High jump	Corey Gibbs (TRI)	2.00	Alain Bailey (JAM)	1.95	Markino Buckley (JAM)	1.95
Long jump	Akido Noel (GRN)	6.43 (-1.7 m/s)	Leon King (BAH)	6.26 (0.3 m/s)	Jermaine Alphous Jackson (JAM)	6.15 (-2.6 m/s)
Triple jump	Jermaine Alphous Jackson (JAM)	14.43w (4.5 m/s)	Durell Williams (BAH)	13.70w (3.8 m/s)	Stephan Roberts (BAH)	13.41w (2.6 m/s)
Shot put	David Villeneuve (MTQ)	15.43	Grégory Gamir (MTQ)	14.77	Steve Hammond (JAM)	13.62
Discus throw	David Villeneuve (MTQ)	44.35	Neil Pinder (BAH)	42.28	Grégory Gamir (MTQ)/ Montez Moxey (BAH)	41.92
Javelin throw	Murvine Charles (GRN)	54.33	Kevon Charles (GRN)	53.79	Ramon Farrington (BAH)	52.72
4 x 100 metres relay	Jamaica	41.35	Bahamas	42.07	Grenada	44.52
4 x 400 metres relay	Jamaica; Nasser Johnson; Andre Wellington; Josef Robertson; Usain Bolt	3:18.88 CR	Bahamas; Tyrone Sawyer; Jacobi Mitchell; Arthur Spencer; Carl Rolle	3:21.22	Grenada; Jeremy Smart; Akido Noel; Andon Mitchell; Joel Phillip	3:27.32

=== Girls under 17 (Youth) ===
Event	Gold		Silver		Bronze	
100 metres (0.6 m/s)	Anneisha McLaughlin (JAM)	11.48	Sherline Duncan (JAM)	11.94	Kelly Ann Baptiste (TRI)	12.05
200 metres (-1.3 m/s)	Anneisha McLaughlin (JAM)	23.04	Tavara Rigby (BAH)	24.33	Sherline Duncan (JAM)	24.37
400 metres	Tavara Rigby (BAH)	54.75	Sonita Sutherland (JAM)	56.01	Kineke Alexander (VIN)	56.23
800 metres	Cadien Beckford (JAM)	2:15.65	Jodian Richards (JAM)	2:16.71	Sade St. Louis (TRI)	2:17.37
1500 metres	Jodian Richards (JAM)	4:44.12	Cadien Beckford (JAM)	4:45.40	Pilar McShine (TRI)	4:46.45
100 metres hurdles (-2.0 m/s)	Latoya Greaves (JAM)	14.14	Marty Phillip (GRN)	14.69	Axelle François-Haugrin (MTQ)	14.94
300 metres hurdles	Latoya Greaves (JAM)	42.69	Marty Phillip (GRN)	43.16	Sheena Hurdle (BAR)	44.35
High jump	Sakina Beaumont (JAM)	1.65	Latroya Darrell (BER)	1.65	Danetle Wright (JAM)	1.60
Long jump	Tamara Francis (JAM)	5.48 (1.2 m/s)	Bianca Stuart (BAH)	5.30 (0.3 m/s)	Silvienne Krosendijk (ARU)	5.19 (0.8 m/s)
Triple jump	LaToya Heath (JAM)	11.58 CR (0.8 m/s)	Latroya Darrell (BER)	11.18 (0.1 m/s)	Kimberley Cadogan (BAR)	11.05 (0.4 m/s)
Shot put	Brittney Marshall (BER)	12.45	Keisha Walkes (BAR)	11.32	Tressa-Anne Charles (LCA)	10.70
Discus throw	Keisha Walkes (BAR)	37.80	Brittney Marshall (BER)	35.87	Tracy Morrison (BAH)	32.76
Javelin throw	Kathy-Ann Gilchrist (GRN)	36.34	Rena Mitchell (GRN)	36.07	Anna Lovell (BAR)	34.29
4 x 100 metres relay	Jamaica	46.27	Grenada	46.85	Bahamas	46.87
4 x 400 metres relay	Jamaica; Cadien Beckford; Sonita Sutherland; Rosemarie Whyte; Anneisha McLaughlin	3:44.18 CR	Grenada; Carine Cox; Nerissa Wells; Trish Bartholomew; Sherry Fletcher	3:46.23	Bahamas; Crystal Strachan; Cotrell Martin; Tamara Rigby; Tavara Rigby	3:48.70

== Medal table (unofficial) ==
* Host nation (Bahamas)

Rank	Nation	Gold	Silver	Bronze	Total
1	Jamaica (JAM)	31	20	16	67
2	Trinidad and Tobago (TTO)	7	2	9	18
3	Bahamas (BAH)*	6	15	13	34
4	Grenada (GRN)	5	10	7	22
5	Martinique (MTQ)	5	4	4	13
6	Antigua and Barbuda (ATG)	5	1	0	6
7	Barbados (BAR)	4	3	7	14
8	Bermuda (BER)	2	3	1	6
9	Guyana (GUY)	1	1	0	2
10	Saint Lucia (LCA)	0	3	1	4
11	Guadeloupe (GLP)	0	2	3	5
12	Belize (BIZ)	0	1	0	1
12	Saint Kitts and Nevis (SKN)	0	1	0	1
14	Netherlands Antilles (AHO)	0	0	2	2
15	Aruba (ARU)	0	0	1	1
15	Cayman Islands (CAY)	0	0	1	1
15	Saint Vincent and the Grenadines (VIN)	0	0	1	1
Totals (17 entries)		66	66	66	198
