= Alleyne Lett =

Grenadian athlete (born 1983)

Personal information
- Born: January 7, 1983 (age 43)

Sport
- Country: Grenada
- Sport: Track and field
- Event: Combined events

Achievements and titles
- Personal best: Decathlon: 7550, Nashville, TN

Alleyne Lett (born 7 January 1983) is a Grenadian athlete who competed in the decathlon.

Lett competed for the LSU Tigers track and field team in the NCAA.

== Personal bests ==
Event	Result	Venue	Date
Outdoor
100 m	10.82 s (wind: +0.8 m/s)	(United States) Nashville, TN	12 May 2005
Long jump	7.42 m (wind: +0.1 m/s)	(United States) Austin, Texas	8 Apr 2005
Shot put	14.62 m	(United States) Nashville, TN	12 May 2005
High jump	1.80 m	(United States) Tucson, Arizona	23 Mar 2004
400 m	50.30 s	(United States) Nashville, TN	12 May 2005
110 m hurdles	13.52 s (wind: +1.2 m/s)	(United States) Sacramento, CA	06 Jun 2007
Discus throw	56.92 m	(United States) Mesa, AZ	29 Apr 2004
Pole vault	3.70 m	(United States) Baton Rouge, LA	25 Mar 2005
Pole vault	3.70 m	(United States) Sacramento, CA	9 Jun 2005
Javelin throw	58.43 m	(United States) Nashville, TN	13 May 2005
1500 m	5:12.98 min	(United States) Nashville, TN	13 May 2005
Decathlon	7550 pts	(United States) Nashville, TN	13 May 2005
Indoor
60 m	7.70 s	(United States) Fayetteville, AR	09 Mar 2007
Shot put	15.09 m	(United States) Baton Rouge, LA	14 Jan 2006
Heptathlon	5033 pts	(United States) Fayetteville, AR	22 Jan 2005

== Competition record ==
Year	Competition	Venue	Position	Event	Notes
Representing Grenada
2001	CARIFTA Games	Bridgetown, Barbados	2nd	Heptathlon (U20)	4838
2002	CARIFTA Games	Nassau, Bahamas	1st	Heptathlon (U20)	4920
2002	CARIFTA Games	Nassau, Bahamas	2nd	Discus throw (U20)	47.00
2002	CARIFTA Games	Nassau, Bahamas	5th	110 m hurdles (U20)	15.15
2002	CARIFTA Games	Nassau, Bahamas	9th	Shot put (U20)	11.09m
2003	Pan American Games	Santo Domingo, Dominican Republic	10th	Discus Throw	47.22 m
2003	Central American and Caribbean Championships in Athletics	St. George's, Grenada	2nd	Discus throw	53.14 m
2003	Central American and Caribbean Championships in Athletics	St. George's, Grenada	2nd	110 m hurdles	13.98
2004	NACAC Under-23 Championships in Athletics	Sherbrooke, Canada	10th	110 m hurdles	14.43
2005	Central American and Caribbean Championships in Athletics	Nassau, Bahamas	3rd	110 m hurdles	13.49
2005	Central American and Caribbean Championships in Athletics	Nassau, Bahamas	6th	Discus throw	46.52 m
