= Jacobi Mitchell =

Bahamian sprinter

Personal information
- Born: January 4, 1986 (age 40)
Medal record
Athletics
Representing Bahamas
CARIFTA Games Junior (U20)
Silver medal – second place	2004 Hamilton	4 × 100 m relay
Bronze medal – third place	2003 Port of Spain	4 × 400 m relay
Bronze medal – third place	2004 Hamilton	4 × 400 m relay
Bronze medal – third place	2004 Hamilton	400 m
CARIFTA Games Junior (U17)
Silver medal – second place	2002 Nassau	400 m
Silver medal – second place	2002 Nassau	4 × 400 m relay

Jacobi Mitchell (born January 4, 1986) is a Bahamian sprinter from Freeport, Bahamas who competed in the 100 m and 200 m and 400 m. He attended Freeport Anglican High School later changed to Bishop Michael Eldon School before going on to compete for the University of Oklahoma.

He ran the 200 m at the 2007 World Championships in Athletics in Osaka, Japan. He also competed in the 200 m and the 4 × 100 m Relay at the 2007 Pan American Games in Rio de Janeiro, Brazil. Mitchell competed at the 2004 World Junior Championships in Athletics in Grosseto, Italy. He transferred to Oklahoma from South Plains College, where he was an NJCAA All-American.

== Personal bests ==
Event	Time	Venue	Date
100 m	10.39 (+0.7)	Lincoln, Nebraska	12 MAY 2007
200 m	20.66 (–0.2)	Lincoln, Nebraska	12 MAY 2007
400 m	47.12	Hamilton, Bermuda	09 APR 2004
