= Anneisha McLaughlin-Whilby =

Jamaican sprinter (born 1986)

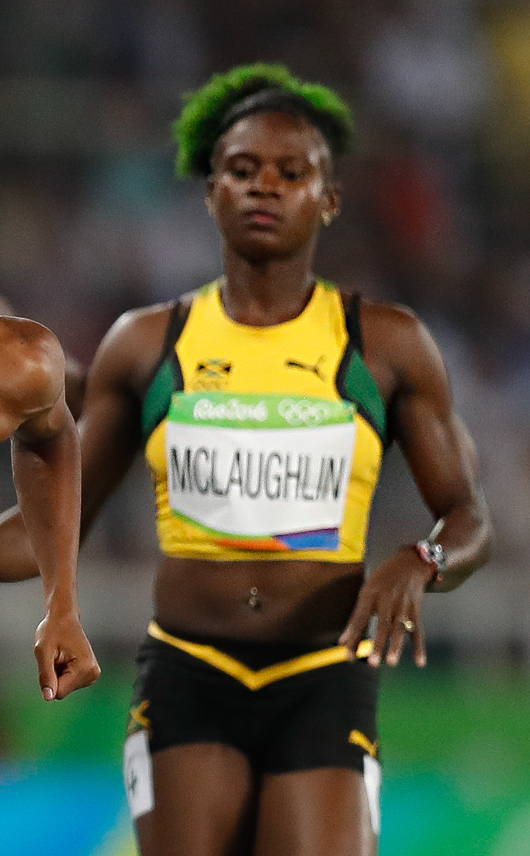
- McLaughlin-Whilby at the 2016 Olympics

Personal information
- Born: 6 January 1986 (age 40) Manchester, Jamaica
- Height: 170 cm (5 ft 7 in)
- Weight: 66 kg (146 lb)

Sport
- Sport: Athletics
- Event: Sprint

Achievements and titles
- Personal bests: 100 m – 11.23 (2013); 200 m – 22.54 (2010); 400 m – 50.76 (2017)
Medal record
Representing Jamaica
Olympic Games
Silver medal – second place	2016 Rio de Janeiro	4×400 m relay
World Indoor Championships
Silver medal – second place	2014 Sopot	4×400 m relay
World Junior Championships
Gold medal – first place	2002 Kingston	4×100 m relay
Silver medal – second place	2000 Santiago	4×400 m relay
Silver medal – second place	2002 Kingston	200 m
Silver medal – second place	2004 Grosseto	4×100 m relay
Silver medal – second place	2004 Grosseto	200 m
World Youth Championships
Gold medal – first place	2003 Sherbrooke	200 m
Bronze medal – third place	2001 Debrecen	400 m
Universiade
Gold medal – first place	2011 Shenzhen	200 m
Bronze medal – third place	2011 Shenzhen	4×100 m relay

Anneisha McLaughlin-Whilby (born 6 January 1986) is a retired Jamaican sprinter who specialized in sprint events specifically the 200 metres and 400 metres. In 2002, she was awarded the Austin Sealy Trophy for the most outstanding athlete of the 2002 CARIFTA Games.

== Achievements ==
Year	Competition	Venue	Position	Event	Notes
Representing Jamaica
2000	CARIFTA Games (U-17)	St. George's, Grenada	1st	400 m	54.57
2000	Central American and Caribbean Junior Championships (U-17)	San Juan, Puerto Rico	1st	400 m	53.54 CR
2000	Central American and Caribbean Junior Championships (U-17)	San Juan, Puerto Rico	1st	4 × 400 m relay	3:40.40 CR
2000	World Junior Championships	Santiago, Chile	2nd	4 × 400 m relay	3:33.99 SB
2001	CARIFTA Games (U-17)	Bridgetown, Barbados	1st	400 m	54.22
2001	CARIFTA Games (U-17)	Bridgetown, Barbados	1st	4 × 100 m relay	45.44
2001	World Youth Championships	Debrecen, Hungary	3rd	400 m	53.35
2002	CARIFTA Games	Nassau, Bahamas	1st	100 m	11.48 (0.6 m/s)
2002	CARIFTA Games	Nassau, Bahamas	1st	200 m	23.04 (-1.3 m/s)
2002	CARIFTA Games	Nassau, Bahamas	1st	4 × 400 m relay	3:44.18 CR
2002	Central American and Caribbean Junior Championships (U-17)	Bridgetown, Barbados	1st	100 m	11.59 CR (0.0 m/s)
2002	Central American and Caribbean Junior Championships (U-17)	Bridgetown, Barbados	1st	200 m	23.27 CR (-1.0 m/s)
2002	Central American and Caribbean Junior Championships (U-17)	Bridgetown, Barbados	1st	4 × 100 m relay	45.33 CR
2002	World Junior Championships	Kingston, Jamaica	2nd	200 m	22.94 PB (wind: -0.2 m/s)
2002	World Junior Championships	Kingston, Jamaica	1st	4 × 100 m relay	43.40 CR
2003	CARIFTA Games	Port of Spain, Trinidad and Tobago	1st	400 m	52.57
2003	CARIFTA Games	Port of Spain, Trinidad and Tobago	1st	4 × 400 m relay	3:36.20 CR
2003	World Youth Championships	Sherbrooke, Canada	1st	200 m	23.26 (-0.4 m/s)
2003	World Youth Championships	Sherbrooke, Canada	2nd	Medley relay	2:07.05 PB
2004	World Junior Championships	Grosseto, Italy	2nd	200m	23.21 (wind: -0.2 m/s)
2004	World Junior Championships	Grosseto, Italy	2nd	4 × 100 m relay	43.63
2004	World Junior Championships	Grosseto, Italy	3rd (h)	4 × 400 m relay	3:33.28
2005	CARIFTA Games	Bacolet, Trinidad and Tobago	2nd	200 m	23.28 (-0.1 m/s)
2007	NACAC Championships	San Salvador, El Salvador	5th	200 m	23.27
2007	NACAC Championships	San Salvador, El Salvador	1st	4 × 100 m relay	43.73
2009	World Championships	Berlin, Germany	5th	200 m	22.62 (-0.1 m/s)
2011	Universiade	Shenzhen, PR China	1st	200 m	22.54 (0.7 m/s)
2011	Universiade	Shenzhen, PR China	3rd	4 × 100 m relay	43.57
