= Carnbee, Trinidad and Tobago =

Carnbee
- town
- Location within Trinidad and Tobago Location within the Caribbean Location within North America
- Coordinates: 11°10′13″N 60°46′48″W
- Country: Trinidad and Tobago
- Ward: Tobago
- Elevation: 20 m (66 ft)
- Time zone: UTC-4 (AST)

Carnbee is a town in Tobago, located about 5 kilometers southwest of Scarborough.
