= Pilar McShine =

Trinidad and Tobago international middle-distance runner

Personal information
- Born: 6 January 1987 (age 39) Port of Spain, Trinidad and Tobago

Sport
- Sport: Track and field
- Event: Middle-distance running
- Club: Florida State Seminoles
Medal record
Representing Trinidad and Tobago
Central American and Caribbean Games
Silver medal – second place	2010 Mayaguez	800m

Pilar McShine (born 6 January 1987) is a Trinidad and Tobago international middle-distance runner. McShine holds the Trinidad and Tobago women's national records for 1500m, 1 mile and 3000m, outdoors and 1500 and 1 mile indoors.

Event	Record	Date	Meet	Place	Ref
800 m	2:02.79	5 July 2009		Havana, Cuba	
1500 m	4:13.21	27 July 2013	Memorial Geert Rasschaert	Ninove, Belgium	
Mile	4:36.79	17 July 2013	Morton Games	(Republic of Ireland) Finglas, Ireland	
3000 m	9:18.29	9 April 2010	FSU Seminole Invite	Tallahassee, United States	
5000 m	16:35.54	18 April 2009		Coral Cables, Florida United States	
1500 m (indoors)	4:36.87+ y	14 March 2009	NCAA Division I Championships	College Station, Texas, United States	
1500 m (indoors)	4:35.99+ y OT	12 February 2010	Husky Classic	Seattle, United States	
Mile (indoors)	4:36.87	14 March 2009	NCAA Division I Championships	College Station, Texas, United States	
Mile (indoors)	4:35.99 OT	12 February 2010	Husky Classic	Seattle, United States	
