= Henry Rolle (coach) =

Bahamian athlete and coach

Henry Rolle is a Bahamian former athlete and Head Coach at Puma MVP International professional running group based in Boca Raton, Florida. MVP International is a branch off club from the MVP Jamaica Group that has coached Elaine Thompson, Shelly-Ann Fraser-Pryce and Asafa Powell.

He coached St. John's College High School in Nassau, Bahamas before going to the States to serve as an assistant coach at Oral Roberts University. Rolle then went on to serve as the assistant Head coach at Auburn University for twenty years. He is now the Puma SE representative for the Caribbean.

Rolle has coached 31 Olympians, 13 World Championship Medalists, Seven Commonwealth Games Medalists, 18 NCAA Champions, and 40 SEC Champions. He also served as Assistant coach for The Bahamas at the 2004 Olympic Games, 2012 Olympic Games and 2016 Olympic Games.

== See also ==
- List of Auburn University people
