= Josef Robertson =

Jamaican hurdler (born 1987)

Personal information
- Born: 14 May 1987 (age 39)
- Height: 1.76 m (5 ft 9 1/2 in)
- Weight: 73 kg (161 lb)

Sport
- Country: Jamaica
- Sport: Athletics
- Event: 400m Hurdles

Josef Robertson (born 14 May 1987) is a Jamaican hurdler. At the 2012 Summer Olympics, he competed in the Men's 400 metres hurdles. He competed at the 2010 Commonwealth Games and the World Championships in Athletics in 2009 and 2011.
