= Central American and Caribbean Junior Championships in Athletics =

Junior athletics competition

The Central American and Caribbean Junior Championships was a junior athletics competition held between the nations of Central America and the Caribbean Islands promoted by the Central American and Caribbean Athletic Confederation (CACAC). It is divided into the Junior B Central American and Caribbean Junior Championships held since 1978 and the Junior A Central American and Caribbean Junior Championships held since 1974. The Junior A category was open for girls and boys aged 17–20 until 2010. and for girls and boys aged 18–20 starting in the year 2012. The Junior B category was open for girls and boys aged 14–16 until 2010. and for girls and boys aged 14–17 starting in the year 2012.

Many world-class and Olympic winning senior athletes competed in the championships in their teenage years. Usain Bolt won the 200 m event in 2002. No competition was held in 2008, due to a clash with the senior 2008 Central American and Caribbean Championships, which had been postponed from the previous year.

At the 2010 edition, a total of 532 athletes from 27 nations took part in the championships' events.

The 2016 edition did not proceed as planned following the announcement of a change towards a wider competition by NACAC regional president Victor Lopez. The new competition, due in 2018, would incorporate Canada and the United States. Lopez noted that the Caribbean region already had shared junior competition at the CARIFTA Games and that Central America already had its own regional junior event.

== Editions ==
Since 2015 replaced by NACAC U20 Championships in Athletics and NACAC U18 Championships in Athletics.

	Year	City	Country	Date	Venue	No. of Events	No. of Athletes
1st	1974	Maracaibo	Venezuela	12–15 December		36	about 196
2nd	1976	Xalapa	Mexico	26–29 August		57	about 127
3rd	1978	Xalapa	Mexico	25–28 August		69	about 293
4th	1980	Nassau	Bahamas	22–25 August		73	about 263
5th	1982	Bridgetown	Barbados	23–25 July		75	about 320
6th	1984	San Juan	Puerto Rico	21–24 June		75	about 355
7th	1986	Mexico City	Mexico	26–29 June		74	about 262
8th	1988	Nassau	Bahamas	30 June – 2 July		74	about 223
9th	1990	Havana	Cuba	6–8 July		77	about 406
10th	1992	Tegucigalpa	Honduras	10–12 July		79	about 304
11th	1994	Port of Spain	Trinidad and Tobago	8–10 July		79	about 377
12th	1996	San Salvador	El Salvador	14–16 July		78	about 524
13th	1998	Georgetown	Cayman Islands	10–12 July	Truman Bodden Sports Complex	79	about 361
14th	2000	San Juan	Puerto Rico	14–16 July	Estadio Sixto Escobar	80	about 422
15th	2002	Bridgetown	Barbados	5–7 July	National Stadium	69	about 445
16th	2004	Coatzacoalcos	Mexico	25–27 June	Estadio Rafael Hernández Ochoa	81	about 411
17th	2006	Port of Spain	Trinidad and Tobago	14–16 July	Hasely Crawford Stadium	81	about 449
18th	2010	Santo Domingo	Dominican Republic	2–4 July	Felix Sanchez Olympic Stadium	80	about 500
19th	2012	San Salvador	El Salvador	29 June – 1 July	Estadio Nacional Flor Blanca "Mágico González"	86	about 467
20th	2014	Morelia	Mexico	4–6 July	Complejo Deprtivo Bicentenario		
21st	2016 (abandoned)	San José	Costa Rica	20–22 May	Estadio Nacional de Costa Rica (2011)		

== Medals ==
=== U20 (1974-2014) ===
Source:

=== U18 (1976-2014) ===
Source:

== Records ==
The Central American and Caribbean Junior Championships in Athletics is divided into the Junior A Championships which began in 1974 and Junior B Central American and Caribbean Junior Championships held since 1978. The Junior A category (Junior) was open for girls and boys aged 17–20 (until 2010), and for girls and boys aged 18–19 (since 2012). The Junior B category (Youth) was open for girls and boys aged 14–16 (until 2010), and for girls and boys aged 14–17 (since 2012). Records are set by athletes who are representing one of the Central American and Caribbean Athletic Confederation (CACAC) member states.

=== Junior A (Junior) ===
==== Men's Junior A records ====
Event	Record	Athlete	Nationality	Date	Meet	Place	Ref.
100 m	10.18 (+0.7 m/s)	Darrel Brown	Trinidad and Tobago	5 July 2002	2002 Central American and Caribbean Junior Championships	Bridgetown, Barbados	
200 m	20.33 (+0.8 m/s)	Zharnel Hughes	Anguilla	5 July 2014	2014 CAC Junior Championships	Morelia, Mexico	
400 m	45.19 A	Roberto Hernández	Cuba	26 June 1986	1986 Central American and Caribbean Junior Championships	Mexico City, Mexico	
800 m	1:46.89	Wesley Vázquez	Puerto Rico	29 June 2012	2012 CAC Junior Championships	San Salvador, El Salvador	
1500 m	3:45.20	Juan Luis Barrios	Mexico	5 July 2002	2002 Central American and Caribbean Junior Championships	Bridgetown, Barbados	
5000 m	14:21.58	Diego Alberto Borrego	Mexico	16 July 2006	2006 Central American and Caribbean Junior Championships	Port of Spain, Trinidad and Tobago	
10,000 m	30:45.12	Elisaldo León	Cuba	6 July 1990	1990 Central American and Caribbean Junior Championships	Havana, Cuba	
110 m hurdles	13.27 (±0.0 m/s)	Yordan O'Farrill	Cuba	1 July 2012	2012 CAC Junior Championships	San Salvador, El Salvador	
400 m hurdles	50.26	Jehue Gordon	Trinidad and Tobago	2 July 2010	2010 Central American and Caribbean Junior Championships	Santo Domingo, Dominican Republic	
3000 m steeplechase	9:02.99	Roberto López	Mexico	23 June 1984	1984 Central American and Caribbean Junior Championships	San Juan, Puerto Rico	
High jump	2.31 m A	Javier Sotomayor	Cuba	29 June 1986	1986 Central American and Caribbean Junior Championships	Mexico City, Mexico	
Pole vault	5.45 m	Alberto Manzano	Cuba	7 July 1990	1990 Central American and Caribbean Junior Championships	Havana, Cuba	
Long jump	7.97 m	Kareem Streete-Thompson	Cayman Islands	6 July 1990	1990 Central American and Caribbean Junior Championships	Havana, Cuba	
Triple jump	16.80 m A	Juan Miguel López	Cuba	29 June 1986	1986 Central American and Caribbean Junior Championships	Mexico City, Mexico	
Shot put (6 kg)	19.70 m	Ashinia Miller	Jamaica	29 June 2012	2012 CAC Junior Championships	San Salvador, El Salvador	
Discus throw	62.93 m	Quincy Wilson	Trinidad and Tobago	4 July 2010	2010 Central American and Caribbean Junior Championships	Santo Domingo, Dominican Republic	
Hammer throw (6 kg)	73.96 m	Diego del Real	Mexico	1 July 2012	2012 CAC Junior Championships	San Salvador, El Salvador	
Javelin throw	82.83 m NR	Keshorn Walcott	Trinidad and Tobago	1 July 2012	2012 CAC Junior Championships	San Salvador, El Salvador	
Decathlon	7101 pts h A	Miguel Valle	Cuba	27 June 1986	1986 Central American and Caribbean Junior Championships	Mexico City, Mexico	
Decathlon	7101 pts h A	100m / Long jump / Shot put / High jump / 400m / 110m H / Discus / Pole vault / Javelin / 1500m; 10.9 / 7.25 m / 12.51 m / 1.82 m / 49.1 / 14.7 / 38.72 m / 4.20 m / 52.82 m / 5:16.8					
10,000 m walk (track)	41:29.66	Cristián David Berdeja	Mexico	15 July 2000	2000 Central American and Caribbean Junior Championships	San Juan, Puerto Rico	
4 × 100 m relay	39.39	Odean Skeen; Tyquendo Tracey; Senoj-Jay Givans; Jazeel Murphy	Jamaica	30 June 2012	2012 CAC Junior Championships	San Salvador, El Salvador	
4 × 400 m relay	3:05.9		Jamaica	10 July 1994	1994 Central American and Caribbean Junior Championships	Port of Spain, Trinidad and Tobago	

Key:
^{WR} World record	^{AR} CAC record	^{NR} National record	^{A} affected by altitude

==== Women's Junior A records ====
Event	Record	Athlete	Nationality	Date	Meet	Place	Ref.
100 m	11.18 (+1.2 m/s)	Veronica Campbell	Jamaica	14 July 2000	2000 Central American and Caribbean Junior Championships	San Juan, Puerto Rico	
200 m	23.20 (+2.0 m/s)	Schillonie Calvert	Jamaica	16 July 2006	2006 Central American and Caribbean Junior Championships	Port of Spain, Trinidad and Tobago	
400 m	51.57	Sonita Sutherland	Jamaica	15 July 2006	2006 CAC Junior Championships	Port of Spain, Trinidad and Tobago	
800 m	2:06.13	Yuneisy Santiusty	Cuba	6 July 2002	2002 Central American and Caribbean Junior Championships	Bridgetown, Barbados	
1500 m	4:24.96	Yuneisy Santiusty	Cuba	5 July 2002	2002 Central American and Caribbean Junior Championships	Bridgetown, Barbados	
3000 m	9:43.23	Santa Velázquez	Mexico	June 1984	1984 Central American and Caribbean Junior Championships	San Juan, Puerto Rico	
5000 m	17:28.53	Mónica Martell	Mexico	14 Jul 1996	1996 Central American and Caribbean Junior Championships	San Salvador, El Salvador	
100 m hurdles	12.93 (±0.0 m/s)	Anay Tejeda	Cuba	6 July 2002	2002 Central American and Caribbean Junior Championships	Bridgetown, Barbados	
400 m hurdles	57.09	Sherene Pinnock	Jamaica	14 July 2006	2006 Central American and Caribbean Junior Championships	Port of Spain, Trinidad and Tobago	
3000 m steeplechase	11:11.91	Leila Mantilla	Puerto Rico	1 July 2012	2012 Central American and Caribbean Junior Championships	San Salvador, El Salvador	
High jump	1.86 m	Sheree Francis	Jamaica	16 July 2000	2000 Central American and Caribbean Junior Championships	San Juan, Puerto Rico	
Pole vault	4.05 m	Alexandra González	Puerto Rico	16 July 2006	2006 Central American and Caribbean Junior Championships	Port of Spain, Trinidad and Tobago	
Long jump	6.56 m (±0.0 m/s)	Rhonda Watkins	Trinidad and Tobago	16 July 2006	2006 Central American and Caribbean Junior Championships	Port of Spain, Trinidad and Tobago	
Triple jump	13.93 m (−0.6 m/s)	Mabel Gay	Cuba	6 July 2002	2002 Central American and Caribbean Junior Championships	Bridgetown, Barbados	
Shot put	15.74 m	Annie Alexander	Trinidad and Tobago	26 June 2004	2004 Central American and Caribbean Junior Championships	Coatzacoalcos, Mexico	
Discus throw	52.20 m	Maricela Bristec	Cuba	6 July 1990	1990 Central American and Caribbean Junior Championships	Havana, Cuba	
Hammer throw	54.51 m	Aline Huerta	Mexico	15 July 2006	2006 Central American and Caribbean Junior Championships	Port of Spain, Trinidad and Tobago	
Javelin throw	55.20 m	Lismania Muñoz	Cuba	30 June 2012	2012 CAC Junior Championships	San Salvador, El Salvador	
Heptathlon	5517 pts	Magalys García	Cuba	7 July 1990	1990 Central American and Caribbean Junior Championships	Havana, Cuba	
Heptathlon	5517 pts	100m H / High jump / Shot put / 200m / Long jump / Javelin / 800m; 14.53 / 1.57 m / 11.45 m / 25.78 / 5.60 m / 51.30 m / 2:17.72					
5000 m walk (track)	22:11.8 h	Maribel Rebollo	Mexico	10 July 1994	1994 Central American and Caribbean Junior Championships	Port of Spain, Trinidad and Tobago	
4 × 100 m relay	44.24	Zakiya Denoon; Alaliyah Telesford; Kayelle Clarke; Akila McShine	Trinidad and Tobago	5 July 2014	2014 CAC Junior Championships	Morelia, Mexico	
4 × 400 m relay	3:34.0		Jamaica	10 July 1994	1994 Central American and Caribbean Junior Championships	Port of Spain, Trinidad and Tobago	

Key:
^{WR} World record	^{AR} South American record	^{NR} National record	^{A} affected by altitude

==== Junior A records in defunct events ====
===== Men's events =====
Event	Record	Name	Nation	Date	Meet	Place	Ref.
3000 m	8:51.4	José Briano	Mexico	14 December 1974	1974 Central American and Caribbean Junior Championships	Maracaibo, Venezuela	
Half marathon	1:08:28	Elisaldo León	Cuba	8 July 1990	1990 Central American and Caribbean Junior Championships	Havana, Cuba	
2000 m steeplechase	6:07.5	Rubén Lee	Mexico	13 December 1974	1974 Central American and Caribbean Junior Championships	Maracaibo, Venezuela	
Hammer throw (senior implement, 7.257 kg)	65.88m	Yosmel Montes	Cuba	July 1996	1996 Central American and Caribbean Junior Championships	San Salvador, El Salvador	

===== Women's events =====
Event	Record	Name	Nation	Date	Meet	Place	Ref.
2000 m steeplechase	6:54.14	Azucena Rodríguez	Mexico	3 July 2010	2010 Central American and Caribbean Junior Championships	Santo Domingo, Dominican Republic	
Pentathlon	3717pts	María Ángeles Cato	Mexico	12/13 December 1974	1974 Central American and Caribbean Junior Championships	Maracaibo, Venezuela	

ht = hand timing
A = affected by altitude

=== Junior B (Youth) ===
==== Men's Junior B records ====
Event	Record	Athlete	Nationality	Date	Meet	Place	Ref.
100 m	10.42 (+0.4 m/s)	Jevaughn Minzie	Jamaica	29 June 2012	2012 CAC Junior Championships	San Salvador, El Salvador	
100 m	10.42 (+1.1 m/s)	Zharnel Hughes	Anguilla	29 June 2012	2012 CAC Junior Championships	San Salvador, El Salvador	
200 m	20.61 (−0.4 m/s)	Usain Bolt	Jamaica	7 July 2002	2002 Central American and Caribbean Junior Championships	Bridgetown, Barbados	
400 m	47.01	Jamal Walton	Cayman Islands	7 July 2014	2014 CAC Junior Championships	Morelia, Mexico	
800 m	1:52.38	Jesús López	Mexico	5 July 2014	2014 CAC Junior Championships	Morelia, Mexico	
1500 m	3:56.60	Edgar Santoyo	Mexico	5 July 2002	2002 Central American and Caribbean Junior Championships	Bridgetown, Barbados	
3000 m	8:34.0	Germán Beltrán	Venezuela	June 1984	1984 Central American and Caribbean Junior Championships	San Juan, Puerto Rico	
110 m hurdles	13.36 (+0.5 m/s)	Roje Jackson-Chin	Jamaica	7 July 2014	2014 CAC Junior Championships	Morelia, Mexico	
400 m hurdles (84.0 cm)	51.68	Okeen Williams	Jamaica	29 June 2012	2012 CAC Junior Championships	San Salvador, El Salvador	
2000 m steeplechase	5:57.04	Néstor Nieves	Venezuela	7 July 1990	1990 Central American and Caribbean Junior Championships	Havana, Cuba	
High jump	2.11 m	Christoffe Bryan	Jamaica	30 June 2012	2012 CAC Junior Championships	San Salvador, El Salvador	
Pole vault	4.71 m	Raúl Ríos	Mexico	1 July 2012	2012 CAC Junior Championships	San Salvador, El Salvador	
Long jump	7.33 m	Eduardo Nava	Mexico	22 June 1984	1984 Central American and Caribbean Junior Championships	San Juan, Puerto Rico	
Triple jump	16.01m (+0.6 m/s)	Miguel van Assen	Suriname	7 July 2014	2014 CAC Junior Championships	Morelia, Mexico	
Shot put	18.92 m	Mario Lozano	Mexico	29 June 2012	2012 CAC Junior Championships	San Salvador, El Salvador	
Discus throw	53.24m	José Higuera	Mexico	6 July 2014	2014 CAC Junior Championships	Morelia, Mexico	
Hammer throw (5 kg)	64.84 m	Léster St. Rose	Cuba	8 July 1990	1990 Central American and Caribbean Junior Championships	Havana, Cuba	
Javelin throw (700 g)	72.39m	Anderson Peters	Grenada	5 July 2014	2014 CAC Junior Championships	Morelia, Mexico	
Octathlon	5192pts	Kevin Roberts	Trinidad and Tobago	June 2012	2012 Central American and Caribbean Junior Championships	San Salvador, El Salvador	
Octathlon	5192pts	100m (wind) / Long jump (wind) / Shot put / 400m / 110m H (wind) / High jump / Javelin / 1000m; 11.39 / 6.87 m (−0.4 m/s) / 11.05 m / 53.43 / 15.02 / 1.95 m / 33.08 m / 3:21.04					
Decathlon	5945 pts	Jafett Juárez	Mexico	6/7 July 2014	2014 CAC Junior Championships	Morelia, Mexico	
Decathlon	5945 pts	100m / Long jump / Shot put / High jump / 400m / 110m H / Discus / Pole vault / Javelin / 1500m; 11.98 (+1.2 m/s) / 6.02 m (+0.9 m/s) / 10.63 m / 1.74 m / 52.88 / 16.09 (−1.3 m/s) / 29.63 m / 3.30 m / 51.40 m / 4:38.30					
10,000 m walk (track)	42:45.24	Noel Chama	Mexico	7 July 2014	2014 CAC Junior Championships	Morelia, Mexico	
4 × 100 m relay	40.17	Michael O'Hara; Raheem Robinson; Gawaine Williams; Jevaughn Minzie	Jamaica	30 June 2012	2012 CAC Junior Championships	San Salvador, El Salvador	
4 × 400 m relay	3:11.66	Asa Guevara; Machel Cedenio; Ruebin Walters; Theon Lewis	Trinidad and Tobago	1 July 2012	2012 CAC Junior Championships	Morelia, Mexico	

Key:
^{WR} World record	^{AR} South American record	^{NR} National record	^{A} affected by altitude

==== Women's Junior B records ====
Event	Record	Athlete	Nationality	Date	Meet	Place	Ref.
100 m	11.51 (+1.1 m/s)	Kimone Shaw	Jamaica	5 July 2014	2014 CAC Junior Championships	Morelia, Mexico	
200 m	23.27 (+1.0 m/s)	Aneisha McLaughlin	Jamaica	7 July 2002	2002 Central American and Caribbean Junior Championships	Bridgetown, Barbados	
400 m	53.39	Shaunae Miller	Bahamas	3 July 2010	2010 Central American and Caribbean Junior Championships	Santo Domingo, Dominican Republic	
800 m	2:09.01	Claudine Williams	Jamaica	7 July 1990	1990 Central American and Caribbean Junior Championships	Havana, Cuba	
1500 m	4:43.55	Alma Delia Cortés	Mexico	6 July 2014	2014 CAC Junior Championships	Morelia, Mexico	
3000 m	10:20.14	Alondra Negrón	Puerto Rico	7 July 2014	2014 CAC Junior Championships	Morelia, Mexico	
100 m hurdles	13.46 (+1.5 m/s)	Jeanine Williams	Jamaica	6 July 2014	2014 CAC Junior Championships	Morelia, Mexico	
400 m hurdles	60.65	Klerianne Estanislao	Puerto Rico	29 June 2012	2012 Central American and Caribbean Junior Championships	San Salvador, El Salvador	
2000 m steeplechase	7:10.52	Alondra Negrón	Puerto Rico	5 July 2014	2014 CAC Junior Championships	Morelia, Mexico	
High jump	1.81m	Catherine Nina	Dominican Republic	2 July 2010	2010 Central American and Caribbean Junior Championships	Santo Domingo, Dominican Republic	
High jump	1.81m	Akela Jones	Barbados	29 June 2012	2012 Central American and Caribbean Junior Championships	San Salvador, El Salvador	
High jump	1.81m	Diana Guadalupe González	Mexico	5 July 2014	2014 CAC Junior Championships	Morelia, Mexico	
Pole vault	3.20 m	Vania Sofía Staufert	Mexico	5 July 2014	2014 CAC Junior Championships	Morelia, Mexico	
Pole vault	3.20 m	Andrea Velasco	El Salvador	5 July 2014	2014 CAC Junior Championships	Morelia, Mexico	
Long jump	6.36m (+0.1 m/s)	Akela Jones	Barbados	29 June 2012	2012 Central American and Caribbean Junior Championships	San Salvador, El Salvador	
Triple jump	12.39m (+0.6 m/s)	Shanique Wright	Jamaica	7 July 2014	2014 CAC Junior Championships	Morelia, Mexico	
Shot put (3 kg)	17.64m	María Fernanda Orozco	Mexico	5 July 2014	2014 CAC Junior Championships	Morelia, Mexico	
Discus throw (1 kg)	50.24 m	Rosalía Vázquez	Cuba	30 June 2012	2012 CAC Junior Championships	San Salvador, El Salvador	
Hammer throw (3 kg)	60.85m	María Victoria Villa	Mexico	5 July 2014	2014 CAC Junior Championships	Morelia, Mexico	
Javelin throw (500g)	52.05m	Luz Mariana Castro	Mexico	5 July 2014	2014 CAC Junior Championships	Morelia, Mexico	
Heptathlon	4715 pts	Naomi Urbano	Mexico	30 June 2012	2012 CAC Junior Championships	San Salvador, El Salvador	
Heptathlon	4715 pts	100m H / High jump / Shot put / 200m / Long jump / Javelin / 800m; 15.60 (−0.5 m/s) / 1.60 m / 10.60 m / 26.37 (NWI) / 5.02 m (+0.4 m/s) / 31.50 m / 2:20.95					
5000 m walk (track)	24:32.47	Vivian Castillo	Mexico	5 July 2014	2014 CAC Junior Championships	Morelia, Mexico	
4 × 100 m relay	44.97	Jeanine Williams; Vanesha Pusey; Shanice Reid; Kimone Shaw	Jamaica	5 July 2014	2014 CAC Junior Championships	Morelia, Mexico	
4 × 400 m relay	3:40.40	Anna-Kay Campbell; Kashain Page; Camille Robinson; Aneisha McLaughlin	Jamaica	16 July 2000	2000 Central American and Caribbean Junior Championships	San Juan, Puerto Rico	

Key:
^{WR} World record	^{AR} South American record	^{NR} National record	^{A} affected by altitude

==== Junior B Records in defunct events ====
===== Men's events =====
Event	Record	Name	Nation	Date	Meet	Place	Ref.
1000 m	2:38.2	Felipe Treviño	Mexico	August 1978	1978 Central American and Caribbean Junior Championships	Xalapa, Mexico	
1200 m	3:09.5	Rubén Rivera	Puerto Rico	August 1980	1980 Central American and Caribbean Junior Championships	(The Bahamas) Nassau, Bahamas	
100 m hurdles	13.09 (+1.0 m/s)	Dwayne Robinson	Jamaica	11 July 1998	1998 Central American and Caribbean Junior Championships	George Town, Grand Cayman, Cayman Islands	
300 m hurdles	38.5	Juan Pineira	Cuba	August 1978	1978 Central American and Caribbean Junior Championships	Xalapa, Mexico	
Pentathlon	2896pts	José Díaz	Mexico	August 1978	1978 Central American and Caribbean Junior Championships	Xalapa, Mexico	
Pentathlon	2896pts	6.09 m (long jump), 44.96 m (javelin), 24.26 (200 m) / 32.07 m (discus), 2:51.0 (800 m)					
Heptathlon	5034pts A	José Rodríguez	Venezuela	Jun 1986	1986 Central American and Caribbean Junior Championships	Mexico City, Mexico	
Heptathlon	5034pts A	(200 m), (long jump), (discus), (high jump) / (110 m hurdles), (javelin), (1000 m)					
5000 m walk (track)	21:24.33	Éder Sánchez	Mexico	7 July 2002	2002 Central American and Caribbean Junior Championships	Bridgetown, Barbados	

===== Women's events =====
Event	Record	Name	Nation	Date	Meet	Place	Ref.
1000 m	3:00.6	Eugenie Beason	Jamaica	August 1978	1978 Central American and Caribbean Junior Championships	Xalapa, Mexico	
1000 m	3:00.6	Sharon Powell	Jamaica	August 1978	1978 Central American and Caribbean Junior Championships	Xalapa, Mexico	
1200 m	3:31.04	Niuvis Pie	Cuba	12 July 1996	1996 Central American and Caribbean Junior Championships	San Salvador, El Salvador	
200 m hurdles	29.6	Debbie Greene	Bahamas	August 1980	1980 Central American and Caribbean Junior Championships	(The Bahamas) Nassau, Bahamas	
300 m hurdles	41.33	Patricia Hall	Jamaica	12 Jul 1998	1998 Central American and Caribbean Junior Championships	George Town, Grand Cayman, Cayman Islands	
Pentathlon	3920 pts	Osiris Pedroso	Cuba	8 July 1990	1990 Central American and Caribbean Junior Championships	Havana, Cuba	
Pentathlon	3920 pts	14.99 (100 m hurdles), 1.66 m (high jump), 13.00 m (shot put) / 5.75 m (long jump), 2:24.01 (800 m)					
4000 m walk (track)	20:24.68	Jamy Franco	Guatemala	14 Jul 2006	2006 Central American and Caribbean Junior Championships	Port of Spain, Trinidad and Tobago	

ht = hand timing
A = affected by altitude
