= 2005 European Athletics U23 Championships – Men's 4 × 400 metres relay =

The men's 4 x 400 metres relay event at the 2005 European Athletics U23 Championships was held in Erfurt, Germany, at Steigerwaldstadion on 16 and 17 July.

== Medalists ==
Gold	Witold Bańka; Piotr Zrada; Daniel Dąbrowski; Piotr Kędzia; Poland
Silver	Andrew Steele; Rhys Williams; Richard Davenport; Robert Tobin; United Kingdom
Bronze	Daniël Ward; Daniël de Wild; Sjors Kampen; Robert Lathouwers; Netherlands

== Results ==
=== Final ===
17 July

Rank	Nation	Competitors	Time	Notes
1st place, gold medalist(s)	Poland	Witold Bańka; Piotr Zrada; Daniel Dąbrowski; Piotr Kędzia	3:04.41	
2nd place, silver medalist(s)	United Kingdom	Andrew Steele; Rhys Williams; Richard Davenport; Robert Tobin	3:04.83	
3rd place, bronze medalist(s)	Netherlands	Daniël Ward; Daniël de Wild; Sjors Kampen; Robert Lathouwers	3:04.99	
4	Romania	Bogdan Vîlcu; Catalin Cîmpeanu; Vasile Boboş; Florin Suciu	3:05.29	
5	Germany	Tilo Ruch; Kamghe Gaba; Thomas Wilhelm; Christopher Helm	3:05.35	
6	Ukraine	Oleksiy Rachkovskyy; Vitaliy Voloshyn; Myhaylo Knysh; Vitaliy Dubonosov	3:05.64	
7	Russia	Ivan Buzolin; Maksim Aleksandrenko; Valentin Kruglyakov; Konstantin Svechkar	3:05.81	
8	Italy	Fiorenzo Moscatelli; Roberto Donati; Gianmarco Leone; Marco Moraglio	3:11.10	

=== Heats ===
16 July
Qualified: first 3 in each heat and 2 best to the Final

==== Heat 1 ====
Rank	Nation	Competitors	Time	Notes
1	Russia	Ivan Kozhukhar; Maksim Aleksandrenko; Valentin Kruglyakov; Ivan Buzolin	3:07.66	Q
2	Netherlands	Youssef el Rhalfioui; Daniël de Wild; Sjors Kampen; Robert Lathouwers	3:08.66	Q
3	Italy	Fiorenzo Moscatelli; Roberto Donati; Gianmarco Leone; Marco Moraglio	3:08.87	Q
4	Spain	Óscar Albalat; Roberto Briones; Antonio Fernández; Alberto Montero	3:09.23	
5	Sweden	Erik Lundvik; Andreas Mokdasi; Niklas Larsson; Gustav Sewall	3:10.55	
	France	Rémi Wallard; Youness Gurachi; Guillaume Wallard; Brice Panel	DQ	

==== Heat 2 ====
Rank	Nation	Competitors	Time	Notes
1	Poland	Witold Bańka; Łukasz Pryga; Paweł Ptak; Piotr Kędzia	3:05.37	Q
2	United Kingdom	Andrew Steele; Adam Charlton; Richard Davenport; Gareth Warburton	3:05.51	Q
3	Romania	Bogdan Vîlcu; Catalin Cîmpeanu; Vasile Boboş; Florin Suciu	3:06.13	Q
4	Germany	Tilo Ruch; Thomas Wilhelm; Carlo Schaper; Christopher Helm	3:06.24	q
5	Ukraine	Oleksiy Rachkovskyy; Vitaliy Dubonosov; Myhaylo Knysh; Vitaliy Voloshyn	3:06.37	q
6	Czech Republic	Petr Klofáč; Rudolf Götz; Richard Synek; Jiří Doupovec	3:07.98	

== Participation ==
According to an unofficial count, 55 athletes from 12 countries participated in the event.

- Czech Republic (4)
- France (4)
- Germany (5)
- Italy (4)
- Netherlands (5)
- Poland (6)
- Romania (4)
- Russia (5)
- Spain (4)
- Sweden (4)
- Ukraine (4)
- United Kingdom (6)
