= 2005 European Athletics U23 Championships – Men's 400 metres =

The men's 400 metres event at the 2005 European Athletics U23 Championships was held in Erfurt, Germany, at Steigerwaldstadion on 14, 15, and 16 July.

== Medalists ==
Gold	Robert Tobin; United Kingdom
Silver	Kamghe Gaba; Germany
Bronze	Daniel Dąbrowski; Poland

== Results ==
=== Final ===
16 July

Rank	Name	Nationality	Time	Notes
1st place, gold medalist(s)	Robert Tobin	United Kingdom	46.81	
2nd place, silver medalist(s)	Kamghe Gaba	Germany	47.07	
3rd place, bronze medalist(s)	Daniel Dąbrowski	Poland	47.44	
4	Dimitrios Gravalos	Greece	47.64	
5	Konstantin Svechkar	Russia	47.87	
6	David Testa	Spain	48.06	
	Piotr Zrada	Poland	DNF	
	David Gillick	Ireland	DNS	

=== Semifinals ===
15 July
Qualified: first 4 in each heat to the Final

==== Semifinal 1 ====
Rank	Name	Nationality	Time	Notes
1	Robert Tobin	United Kingdom	45.64	Q
2	Daniel Dąbrowski	Poland	45.93	Q
3	Dimitrios Gravalos	Greece	45.99	Q
4	David Gillick	Ireland	46.03	Q
5	Piotr Kędzia	Poland	46.62	
6	Óscar Albalat	Spain	47.05	
	Nils Duerinck	Belgium	DQ	IAAF rule 163.3
	Robert Lathouwers	Netherlands	DQ	IAAF rule 163.3

==== Semifinal 2 ====
Rank	Name	Nationality	Time	Notes
1	Konstantin Svechkar	Russia	46.09	Q
2	Kamghe Gaba	Germany	46.24	Q
3	Piotr Zrada	Poland	46.27	Q
4	David Testa	Spain	46.35	Q
5	Daniël Ward	Netherlands	46.37	
6	Oleksiy Rachkovskyy	Ukraine	46.57	
7	Mathieu Schoeps	Belgium	46.65	
8	Brice Panel	France	46.83	

=== Heats ===
14 July
Qualified: first 3 in each heat and 4 best to the Semifinal

==== Heat 1 ====
Rank	Name	Nationality	Time	Notes
1	Konstantin Svechkar	Russia	46.19	Q
2	David Gillick	Ireland	46.25	Q
3	Kamghe Gaba	Germany	46.55	Q
4	Piotr Kędzia	Poland	46.67	q
5	Óscar Albalat	Spain	46.92	q
6	Richard Davenport	United Kingdom	47.45	
7	Valentin Bulychov	Azerbaijan	47.55	

==== Heat 2 ====
Rank	Name	Nationality	Time	Notes
1	Oleksiy Rachkovskyy	Ukraine	46.62	Q
2	Daniël Ward	Netherlands	46.77	Q
3	Mathieu Schoeps	Belgium	46.85	Q
4	Brice Panel	France	47.06	q
5	Gareth Warburton	United Kingdom	47.34	
6	Marco Moraglio	Italy	47.85	

==== Heat 3 ====
Rank	Name	Nationality	Time	Notes
1	Robert Tobin	United Kingdom	45.98	Q
2	Piotr Zrada	Poland	46.57	Q
3	David Testa	Spain	47.09	Q
4	Nils Duerinck	Belgium	47.09	q
5	Zoltán Borsányi	Hungary	47.15	
6	Myhaylo Knysh	Ukraine	47.18	
7	Andreas Mokdasi	Sweden	47.34	

==== Heat 4 ====
Rank	Name	Nationality	Time	Notes
1	Daniel Dąbrowski	Poland	46.77	Q
2	Dimitrios Gravalos	Greece	46.83	Q
3	Robert Lathouwers	Netherlands	47.03	Q
4	Vitaliy Duonosov	Ukraine	47.23	
5	Rémi Wallard	France	47.47	
6	Catalin Cîmpeanu	Romania	47.90	

== Participation ==
According to an unofficial count, 26 athletes from 16 countries participated in the event.

- Azerbaijan (1)
- Belgium (2)
- France (2)
- Germany (1)
- Greece (1)
- Hungary (1)
- Ireland (1)
- Italy (1)
- Netherlands (2)
- Poland (3)
- Romania (1)
- Russia (1)
- Spain (2)
- Sweden (1)
- Ukraine (3)
- United Kingdom (3)
