= Athletics at the 2009 Mediterranean Games =

2009 Athletics at the Mediterranean Games

- Dates: 30 June – 3 July
- Host city: Pescara, Italy
- Venue: Stadio Adriatico
- Events: 40 (+2 disability)
- Participation: 372 (+disabled) athletes from 21 nations
- Records set: 7

The athletics competitions at the 2009 Mediterranean Games in Pescara took place between 30 June and 3 July at the Stadio Adriatico.

== Medal table ==
* Host nation (Italy)

Rank	Nation	Gold	Silver	Bronze	Total
1	Italy*	11	12	7	30
2	France	7	12	3	22
3	Morocco	6	6	2	14
4	Greece	4	3	8	15
5	Spain	4	1	2	7
6	Turkey	3	3	4	10
7	Cyprus	2	1	1	4
8	Tunisia	2	0	2	4
9	Libya	1	0	3	4
10	Algeria	1	0	2	3
11	Egypt	1	0	1	2
12	Croatia	0	1	3	4
12	Slovenia	0	1	3	4
14	Serbia	0	1	2	3
15	Bosnia and Herzegovina	0	1	0	1
Totals (15 entries)		42	42	43	127

== Medal summary ==
=== Men ===
Event	Gold		Silver		Bronze	
100 metres	Martial Mbandjock (FRA)	10.15	Emanuele Di Gregorio (ITA)	10.21	Fabio Cerutti (ITA)	10.23
200 metres	Amr Ibrahim Seoud (EGY)	20.78	Matteo Galvan (ITA)	20.92	Khalid Zougari Idriss (MAR)	20.95
400 metres	Mohamed Khouaja (LBA)	45.77	Teddy Venel (FRA)	46.04	Yannick Fonsat (FRA)	46.07 PB
800 metres	Amine Laâlou (MAR)	1:46.76	Jeff Lastennet (FRA)	1:47.74	Aboubaker Elghatruni (LBA)	1:48.10
1500 metres	Antar Zerguelaïne (ALG)	3:37.49	Mohamed Moustaoui (MAR)	3:37.97	Abdalaati Iguider (MAR)	3:38.66
5000 metres	Anis Selmouni (MAR)	13:55.98	Stefano La Rosa (ITA)	14:04.44	Kemal Koyuncu (TUR)	14:04.99
10,000 metres	Hicham Bellani (MAR)	29:33.51	Mohammed Amyn (MAR)	29:34.90	Selim Bayrak (TUR)	29:36.29
110 metres hurdles	Jackson Quiñónez (ESP)	13.60	Dimitri Bascou (FRA)	13.75	Jurica Grabušić (CRO)	13.82
400 metres hurdles	Sébastien Maillard (FRA)	49.80	Salah-Eddine Ghaidi (FRA)	50.10	Hamza Deyaf (LBA)	50.21PB
3000 m steeplechase	Jamel Chatbi (MAR)	8:13.11 GR	Chakir Boujattaoui (MAR)	8:13.83 PB	Halil Akkaş (TUR)	8:30.84
4×100 metres relay	Italy (ITA); Maurizio Checcucci; Simone Collio; Emanuele Di Gregorio; Fabio Cerutti	38.82	France (FRA); Emmanuel Ngom Priso; Ydrissa M'Barke; Pierre-Alexis Pessonneaux; Christophe Bonnet	39.49	Turkey (TUR); Emrah Altunkalem; Ali Ekber Kayas; Mustafa Delioglu; Tuncay Ors	40.73
4×400 metres relay	Spain (ESP); Aitor Martín Esteban; Santiago Ezquerro Cordon; Mark Ujakpor; Marc Orozco Torres	3:06.19	France (FRA); Yannick Fonsat; Akhenaton Silou; Salah-Eddine Ghaidi; Nicolas Fillon	3:06.28	Greece (GRE); Tilemachos Routas; Dimitrios Gravalos; Pantelis Melachroinoudis; Petros Kyriakidis	3:06.29
Half Marathon	Ahmed Baday (MAR)	1:04:06	José Manuel Martínez (ESP)	1:04:20	Ali Mabrouk El Zaidi (LBA)	1:04:36
20 km walk	Ivano Brugnetti (ITA)	1:22:33 GR	Giorgio Rubino (ITA)	1:22:34	Juan Manuel Molina (ESP)	1:23:02
High jump	Kyriakos Ioannou (CYP)	2.30 m GR	Konstadinos Baniotis (GRE)	2.28 m	Dragutin Topić (SER)	2.26 m
Long jump	Salim Sdiri (FRA)	8.29 m GR	Yahya Berrabah (MAR)	8.23 m	Louis Tsatoumas (GRE)	8.20 m
Triple jump	Fabrizio Schembri (ITA)	17.09 m	Dimitrios Tsiamis (GRE)	16.98 m	Daniele Greco (ITA)	16.64 m PB
Shot put	Manuel Martínez (ESP)	20.30 m	Hamza Alić (BIH)	20.05 m	Nedžad Mulabegović (CRO)	19.85 m
Discus throw	Frank Casañas (ESP)	65.58 m GR	Ercüment Olgundeniz (TUR)	63.48 m	Yasser Farag (EGY)	61.07 m
Hammer throw	Nicola Vizzoni (ITA)	75.92 m	Jérôme Bortoluzzi (FRA)	73.73 m	Alexandros Papadimitriou (GRE)	73.69 m
Javelin throw	Fatih Avan (TUR)	79.78 m PB	Spyridon Lebesis (GRE)	78.66 m PB	Matija Kranjc (SLO)	77.82 m

=== Women ===
Event	Gold		Silver		Bronze	
100 metres	Georgia Kokloni (GRE)	11.41	Myriam Soumaré (FRA)	11.46	Eleni Artymata (CYP); Ayodelé Ikuesan (FRA)	11.55
200 metres	Eleni Artymata (CYP)	23.16 PB	Sabina Veit (SLO)	23.45	Vincenza Calì (ITA)	23.49
400 metres	Libania Grenot (ITA)	50.30 GR	Daniela Reina (ITA)	52.34	Aurélie Kamga (FRA)	53.26 PB
800 metres	Elisa Cusma (ITA)	1:59.87 GR	Halima Hachlaf (MAR)	2:00.91 PB	Eleni Filandra (GRE)	2:01.13 PB
1500 metres	Elisa Cusma (ITA)	4:11.88	Btissam Lakhouad (MAR)	4:12.07	Habiba Ghribi (TUN)	4:12.37 PB
5000 metres	Hanane Ouhaddou (MAR)	15:12.75 PB	Elena Romagnolo (ITA)	15:13.19 PB	Silvia Weissteiner (ITA)	15:15.95
10,000 metres	Olivera Jevtić (SRB)	32:23.06	Kenza Dahmani (ALG)	32:48.44	(none) (25x17px)	
100 metres hurdles	Nevin Yanıt (TUR)	13.08	Sandra Gomis (FRA)	13.24	Micol Cattaneo (ITA)	13.39
400 metres hurdles	Phara Anacharsis (FRA)	56.66 PB	Aurore Kassambara (FRA)	56.89	Nikolina Horvat (CRO)	56.97
4×100 metres relay	France (FRA); Myriam Soumaré; Ayodelé Ikuesan; Nelly Banco; Émilie Gaydu	43.79	Italy (ITA); Anita Pistone; Maria Aurora Salvagno; Giulia Arcioni; Vincenza Calì	43.86	Greece (GRE); Maria Gatou; Agni Derveni; Andrianna Ferra; Georgia Kokloni	45.45
Half marathon	Anna Incerti (ITA)	1:12:25	Rosaria Console (ITA)	1:12:34	Kenza Dahmani (ALG)	1:12:39
High jump	Antonietta Di Martino (ITA)	1.97 m	Burcu Ayhan (TUR)	1.89 m PB	Antonia Stergiou (GRE)	1.89 m
Pole vault	Nikoleta Kyriakopoulou (GRE)	4.50 m GR	Marianna Zachariadi (CYP)	4.45 m	Anna Giordano Bruno (ITA)	4.35 m
Long jump	Tania Vicenzino (ITA)	6.54 m PB	Karin Melis Mey (TUR)	6.53 m	Nina Kolarič (SLO)	6.50 m
Triple jump ^{A}	Athanasia Perra (GRE)	14.62 m PB	Teresa Nzola Meso Ba (FRA)	14.16 m	Paraskevi Papachristou (GRE)	14.12 m
Shot put	Jessica Cérival (FRA)	17.77 m	Assunta Legnante (ITA)	17.44 m	Chiara Rosa (ITA)	17.24 m
Discus throw	Mélina Robert-Michon (FRA)	61.17 m	Vera Begić (CRO)	60.29 m	Dragana Tomašević (SRB)	58.73 m
Hammer throw	Silvia Salis (ITA)	70.39 m	Clarissa Claretti (ITA)	69.35 m	Stiliani Papadopoulou (GRE)	67.35 m
Javelin throw	Savva Lika (GRE)	60.97 m	Zahra Bani (ITA)	60.65 m	Martina Ratej (SLO)	59.08 m

=== Disability athletics ===
Event	Gold		Silver		Bronze	
Men's 1500 metres T54	Amhed Aouadi (TUN)	3:17.07	Julien Casoli (FRA)	3:17.33	Roger Puigbò Verdaguer (ESP)	3:18.27
Women's 800 metres T54	Samira Berri (TUN)	2:07.08	Francesca Porcellato (ITA)	2:07.67	Masouda Siffi (TUN)	2:17.12

== Games records ==
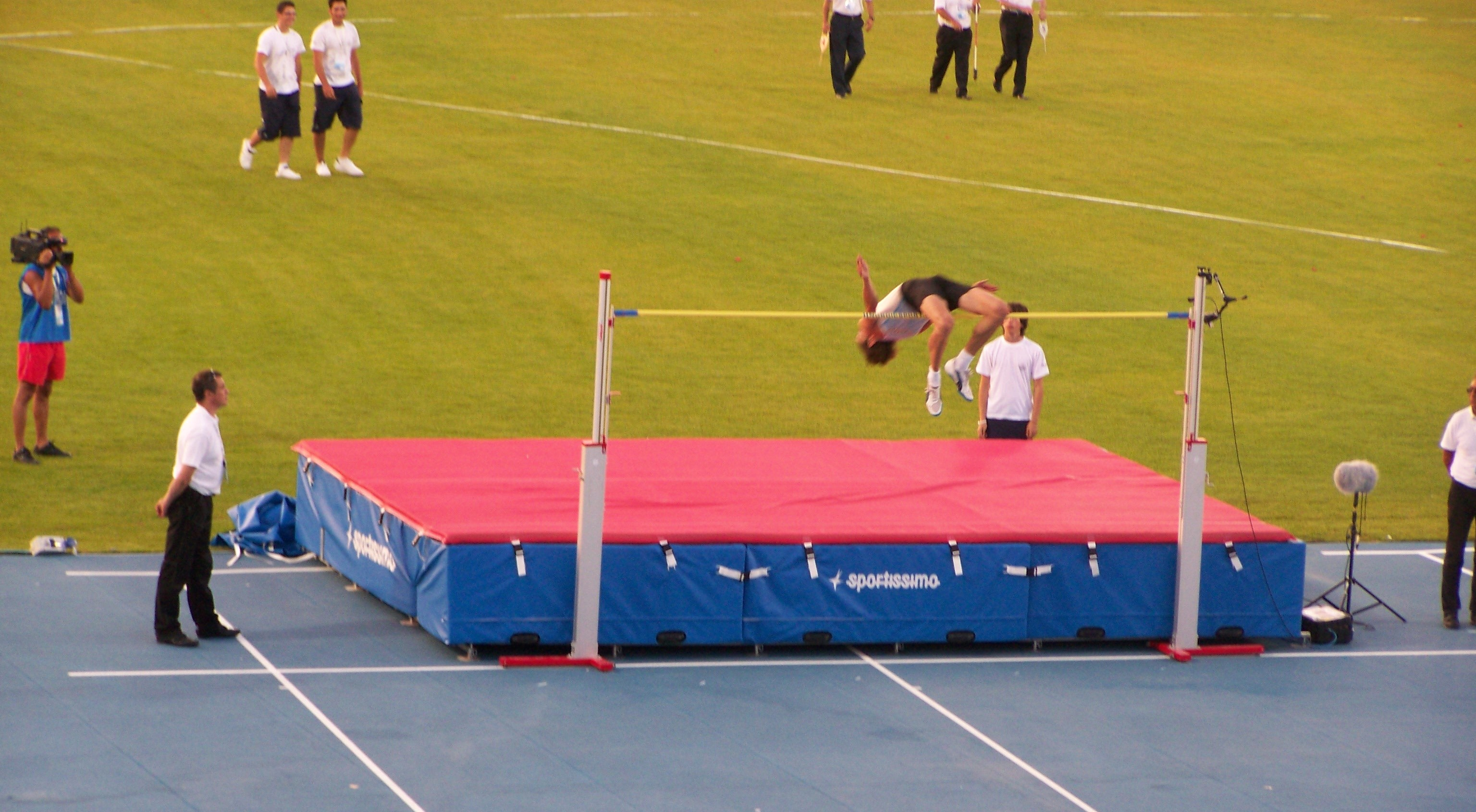
Cypriot Kyriakos Ioannou broke the high jump record.

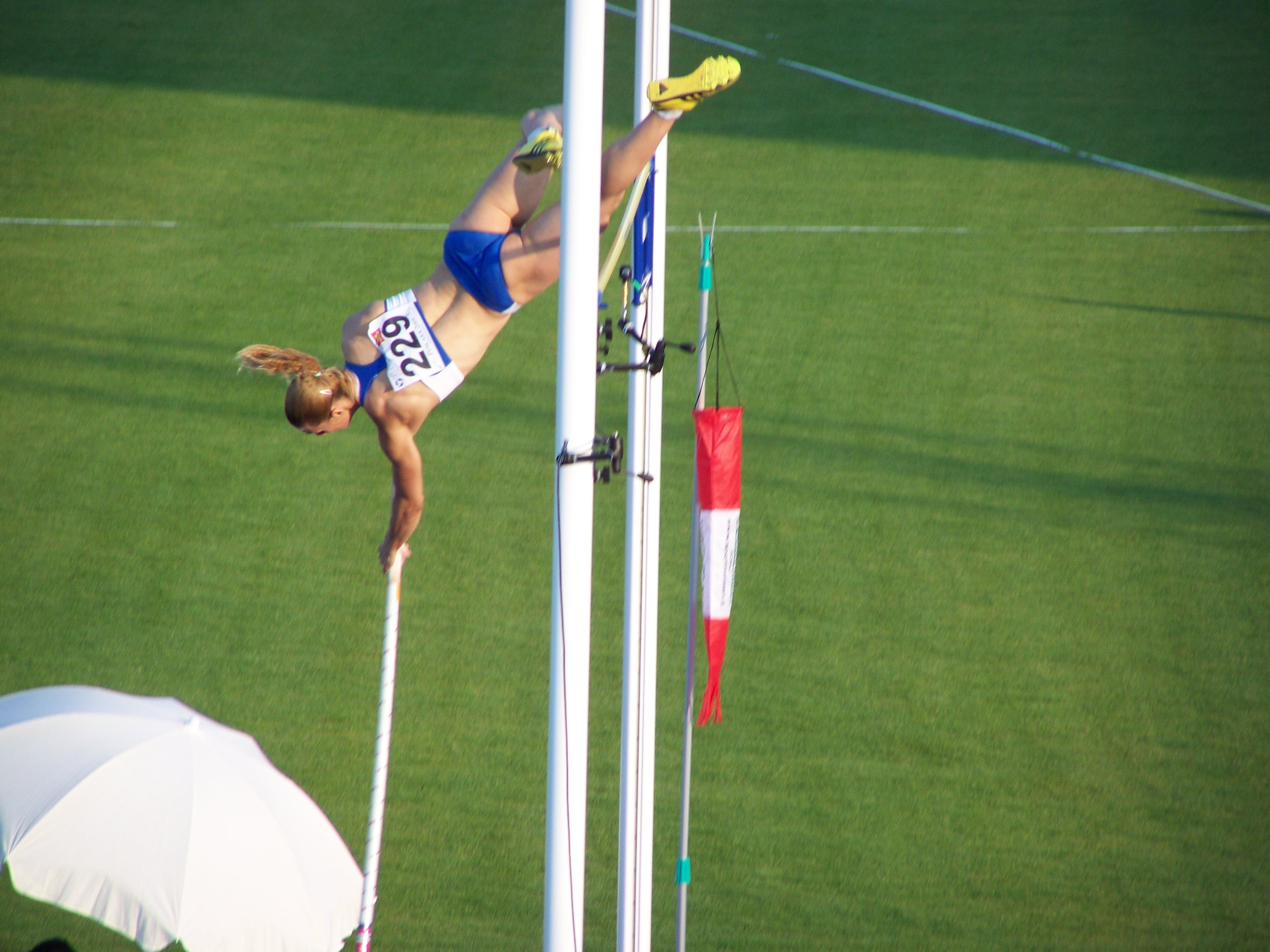
Record breaker and gold medallist Nikoleta Kyriakopoulou competing in the pole vault

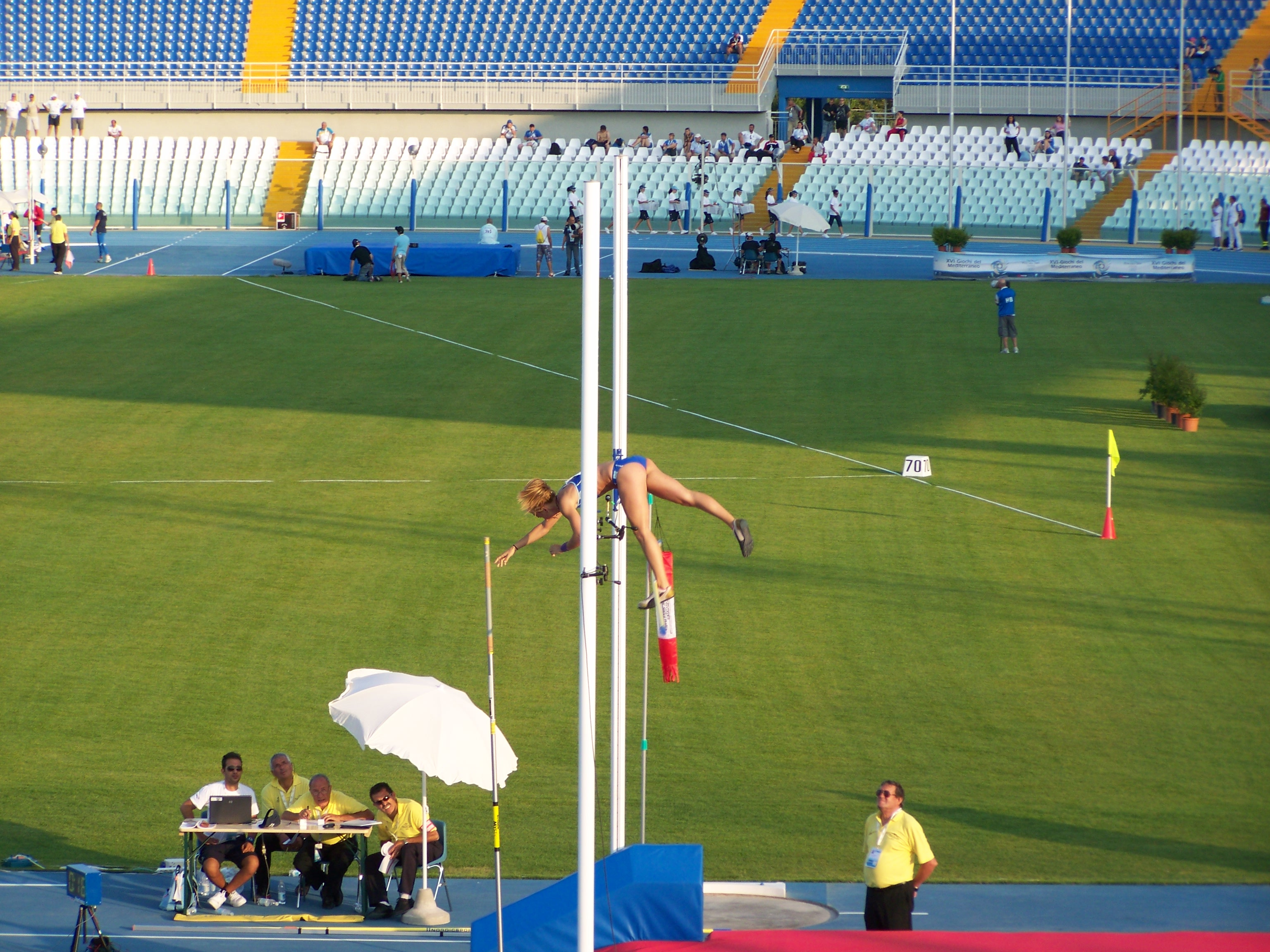
Pole vault silver medallist Marianna Zachariadi clearing the bar in Pescara

Name	Event	Country	Record
Jamel Chatbi	3000 metres steeplechase	Morocco	8:13.11
Ivano Brugnetti	20 kilometres walk	Italy	1:22:33
Nikoleta Kyriakopoulou	Pole vault	Greece	4.50 m
Kyriakos Ioannou	High jump	Cyprus	2.30 m
Salim Sdiri	Long jump	France	8.29 m
Frank Casañas	Discus throw	Spain	65.58 m
Libania Grenot	400 metres	Italy	50.30
Elisa Cusma Piccione	800 metres	Italy	1:59.87

== Participating nations ==
- Albania (2)
- Algeria (8)
- Bosnia and Herzegovina (5)
- Croatia (11)
- Cyprus (20)
- Egypt (5)
- France (53)
- Greece (65)
- Italy (63)
- Libya (11)
- Malta (1)
- Monaco (2)
- Montenegro (4)
- Morocco (31)
- San Marino (2)
- Serbia (10)
- Slovenia (12)
- Spain (24)
- Syria (2)
- Tunisia (13)
- Turkey (28)

== Notes ==
- ^A Italian triple jumper Magdelín Martínez was second in the contest with a jump of 14.16 m according to the competition results, but she is not listed among the medalists, while Papachristou of Greece (who finished fourth) is credited with the bronze medal. As it was proven, the jump of Martinez was not 14.16 m, but 14.11 m. The mistake was caused by the automatic measure machine, which stuck after Nzola's last jump (14.16). The bronze medal was finally appointed to Papachristou.

== Men's results ==
=== 100 meters ===
Heats – 1 July
Wind:
Heat 1: +2.2 m/s, Heat 2: +2.4 m/s

Rank	Heat	Name	Nationality	Time	Notes
1	1	Martial Mbandjock	France	10.14	Q
2	1	Fabio Cerutti	Italy	10.18	Q
3	2	Emanuele Di Gregorio	Italy	10.22	Q
4	2	Aziz Ouhadi	Morocco	10.29	Q
5	1	Amr Ibrahim Mostafa Seoud	Egypt	10.38	Q
6	1	Panagiotis Ioannou	Cyprus	10.38	q
7	2	Ángel David Rodríguez	Spain	10.46	Q
8	2	Emmanuel Ngom Priso	France	10.50	q
9	2	Gregor Kokalovič	Slovenia	10.53	
10	1	Panagiotis Sarris	Greece	10.55	
11	2	Georgios Koutsotheodorou	Greece	10.64	
12	2	Mustafa Delioğlu	Turkey	10.71	
13	1	Emrah Altunkalem	Turkey	10.76	
14	2	Nicolai Portelli	Malta	10.90	
	1	Luis Wee Palacios	Spain	DNS	

Final – 1 July
Wind:
+1.0 m/s

Rank	Lane	Name	Nationality	Time	Notes
1st place, gold medalist(s)	4	Martial Mbandjock	France	10.15	
2nd place, silver medalist(s)	5	Emanuele Di Gregorio	Italy	10.21	
3rd place, bronze medalist(s)	3	Fabio Cerutti	Italy	10.23	SB
4	6	Aziz Ouhadi	Morocco	10.29	
5	8	Ángel David Rodríguez	Spain	10.41	SB
6	1	Panagiotis Ioannou	Cyprus	10.43	
7	7	Amr Ibrahim Mostafa Seoud	Egypt	10.45	
8	2	Emmanuel Ngom Priso	France	10.47	

=== 200 meters ===
Heats – 1 July
Wind:
Heat 1: –0.2 m/s, Heat 2: +1.1 m/s

Rank	Heat	Name	Nationality	Time	Notes
1	1	Pierre-Alexis Pessonneaux	France	20.89	Q, PB
2	1	Amr Ibrahim Mostafa Seoud	Egypt	20.90	Q
3	1	Matteo Galvan	Italy	20.98	Q, SB
4	2	Ydrissa M'Barke	France	21.00	Q, SB
5	2	Khalid Idrissi Zougari	Morocco	21.17	Q
6	1	Ángel David Rodríguez	Spain	21.18	q, SB
6	2	Gregor Kokalovič	Slovenia	21.18	Q
8	2	Lykourgos-Stefanos Tsakonas	Greece	21.24	q
9	1	Jan Žumer	Slovenia	21.25	
10	1	Georgios Koutsotheodorou	Greece	21.39	
11	1	Ali Ekber Kayaş	Turkey	21.52	
12	2	Mustafa Delioğlu	Turkey	21.56	
13	2	Nicolai Portelli	Malta	21.77	
14	2	Teo Turchi	Italy	21.81	
15	2	Darko Raicević	Montenegro	22.76	

Final – 30 June
Wind:
–0.4 m/s

Rank	Lane	Name	Nationality	Time	Notes
1st place, gold medalist(s)	6	Amr Ibrahim Mostafa Seoud	Egypt	20.78	
2nd place, silver medalist(s)	1	Matteo Galvan	Italy	20.92	SB
3rd place, bronze medalist(s)	4	Khalid Idrissi Zougari	Morocco	20.95	
4	3	Pierre-Alexis Pessonneaux	France	21.00	
5	7	Ángel David Rodríguez	Spain	21.05	SB
6	5	Ydrissa M'Barke	France	21.15	
7	8	Gregor Kokalovič	Slovenia	21.21	
8	2	Lykourgos-Stefanos Tsakonas	Greece	21.27	

=== 400 meters ===
Heats – 1 July

Rank	Heat	Name	Nationality	Time	Notes
1	2	Mohamed Khouaja	Libya	46.15	Q
2	3	Teddy Venel	France	46.28	Q
3	2	Chouaib Chalbi	Tunisia	46.51	Q
4	1	Petros Kyriakidis	Greece	46.59	Q
5	2	Dimitrios Gravalos	Greece	46.63	q
6	1	Yannick Fonsat	France	46.65	Q, SB
7	1	Mark Ujakpor	Spain	46.66	q, SB
8	3	Sebastijan Jagarinec	Slovenia	46.73	Q
9	3	Abdelkrim Khoudri	Morocco	46.82	
10	3	Željko Vincek	Croatia	46.85	
11	1	Andrea Barberi	Italy	46.93	
12	2	Domenico Fontana	Italy	47.01	
13	2	Ismail Daif	Morocco	47.11	
14	3	Santiago Ezquerro	Spain	47.52	SB
15	1	Mohamed Amine Guezmil	Tunisia	47.54	
16	3	Ali Ekber Kayaş	Turkey	47.71	
17	2	Yahya ışık	Turkey	48.58	
18	1	Ivano Bucci	San Marino	49.41	
19	1	Florent Battistel	Monaco	51.78	

Final – 2 July

Rank	Lane	Name	Nationality	Time	Notes
1st place, gold medalist(s)	4	Mohamed Khouaja	Libya	45.77	
2nd place, silver medalist(s)	6	Teddy Venel	France	46.04	SB
3rd place, bronze medalist(s)	8	Yannick Fonsat	France	46.06	PB
4	3	Chouaib Chalbi	Tunisia	46.08	PB
5	5	Petros Kyriakidis	Greece	46.25	PB
6	2	Dimitrios Gravalos	Greece	46.29	SB
7	1	Mark Ujakpor	Spain	46.46	SB
8	7	Sebastijan Jagarinec	Slovenia	46.57	PB

=== 800 meters ===
Heats – 30 June

Rank	Heat	Name	Nationality	Time	Notes
1	1	Amine Laâlou	Morocco	1:48.25	Q
2	1	Livio Sciandra	Italy	1:49.13	Q, SB
3	1	Abdeslam Kenouche	France	1:49.19	Q
4	1	Juan de Dios Jurado	Spain	1:49.62	q
5	2	Jeff Lastennet	France	1:49.69	Q
6	2	Konstantinos Nakopoulos	Greece	1:49.77	Q
7	2	Aboubaker Elghatruni	Libya	1:49.87	Q
8	2	Giordano Benedetti	Italy	1:50.25	q
9	2	Jure Božinović	Croatia	1:50.34	
10	1	Efthymios Papadopoulos	Greece	1:50.63	
11	2	Emrah Coban	Turkey	1:51.04	
12	2	Ilija Ranitović	Montenegro	1:52.62	
13	1	Darko Rosić	Bosnia and Herzegovina	1:53.30	SB
	1	Ramzi Abbassi	Tunisia	DNS	

Final – 2 July

Rank	Name	Nationality	Time	Notes
1st place, gold medalist(s)	Amine Laâlou	Morocco	1:46.76	
2nd place, silver medalist(s)	Jeff Lastennet	France	1:47.74	
3rd place, bronze medalist(s)	Aboubaker Elghatruni	Libya	1:48.10	SB
4	Livio Sciandra	Italy	1:48.25	SB
5	Konstantinos Nakopoulos	Greece	1:48.55	
6	Abdeslam Kenouche	France	1:49.17	
7	Juan de Dios Jurado	Spain	1:50.72	
8	Giordano Benedetti	Italy	1:51.56	

=== 1500 meters ===
2 July

Rank	Name	Nationality	Time	Notes
1st place, gold medalist(s)	Antar Zerguelaïne	Algeria	3:37.49	
2nd place, silver medalist(s)	Mohamed Moustaoui	Morocco	3:37.97	
3rd place, bronze medalist(s)	Abdalaati Iguider	Morocco	3:38.66	
4	Taoufik Makhloufi	Algeria	3:39.37	
5	Goran Nava	Serbia	3:39.58	SB
6	Álvaro Rodríguez	Spain	3:41.32	
7	Víctor Riobó	Spain	3:42.55	
8	Abdelkader Bakhtache	France	3:43.14	
9	Christian Obrist	Italy	3:43.21	
10	Mirko Petrović	Serbia	3:45.05	
11	Giulio Iannone	Italy	3:46.84	
12	Kemal Koyuncu	Turkey	3:49.78	
13	Vasileios Papaioannou	Greece	3:53.18	
14	Darko Rosić	Bosnia and Herzegovina	4:00.71	

=== 5000 meters ===
3 July

Rank	Name	Nationality	Time	Notes
1st place, gold medalist(s)	Anis Selmouni	Morocco	13:55.98	
2nd place, silver medalist(s)	Stefano La Rosa	Italy	14:04.44	
3rd place, bronze medalist(s)	Kemal Koyuncu	Turkey	14:04.99	
4	Mirko Petrović	Serbia	14:05.86	
5	Michail Gelasakis	Greece	14:28.10	
	Antonios Papantonis	Greece	DNF	
	Mourad Marofit	Morocco	DNS	

=== 10,000 meters ===
2 July

Rank	Name	Nationality	Time	Notes
1st place, gold medalist(s)	Hicham Bellani	Morocco	29:33.51	
2nd place, silver medalist(s)	Mohammed Amyn	Morocco	29:34.90	
3rd place, bronze medalist(s)	Selim Bayrak	Turkey	29:36.29	
4	Denis Curzi	Italy	29:42.65	
5	Gianmarco Buttazzo	Italy	30:01.83	
6	Christoforos Merousis	Greece	30:16.99	
	Dimos Manginas	Greece	DNS	

=== Half marathon ===
3 July

Rank	Name	Nationality	Time	Notes
1st place, gold medalist(s)	Ahmed Baday	Morocco	1:04:06	
2nd place, silver medalist(s)	José Manuel Martínez	Spain	1:04:20	
3rd place, bronze medalist(s)	Ali Mabrouk El Zaidi	Libya	1:04:36	
4	Ruggero Pertile	Italy	1:04:49	
5	Mehmet Çağlayan	Turkey	1:06:04	
6	Murat Ertaş	Turkey	1:06:23	
7	Abdellah Falil	Morocco	1:06:34	
8	Daniele Caimmi	Italy	1:07:40	
9	Giovanni Ruggiero	Italy	1:07:40	
10	Adel Elmahjoub	Libya	1:08:07	
11	Ioannis Magkriotelis	Greece	1:10:06	
12	Bekir Karayel	Turkey	1:10:47	
	Georgios Karavidas	Greece	DNF	
	Dimitrios Theodorakakos	Greece	DNF	

=== 110 meters hurdles ===
Heats – 30 June
Wind:
Heat 1: +0.1 m/s, Heat 2: +0.4 m/s

Rank	Heat	Name	Nationality	Time	Notes
1	2	Jackson Quiñónez	Spain	13.75	Q
2	2	Cédric Lavanne	France	13.78	Q
3	1	Jurica Grabušić	Croatia	13.81	Q
4	1	Dimitri Bascou	France	13.84	Q
5	1	Othmane Hadj Lazib	Algeria	13.90	Q
6	1	Emanuele Abate	Italy	14.08	q
7	2	Aymen Ben Ahmed	Tunisia	14.11	Q
8	1	Alexandros Stavridis	Cyprus	14.18	q
9	1	Nikolaos Filandarakis	Greece	14.19	
10	2	Elton Bitincka	Albania	14.21	
11	2	Adnan Malkić	Bosnia and Herzegovina	14.30	
12	2	Giannis Lazaidis	Greece	14.37	

Final – 30 June
Wind:
–0.4 m/s

Rank	Lane	Name	Nationality	Time	Notes
1st place, gold medalist(s)	6	Jackson Quiñónez	Spain	13.60	
2nd place, silver medalist(s)	3	Dimitri Bascou	France	13.75	
3rd place, bronze medalist(s)	4	Jurica Grabušić	Croatia	13.82	
4	8	Othmane Hadj Lazib	Algeria	13.91	
5	7	Aymen Ben Ahmed	Tunisia	13.92	
6	2	Emanuele Abate	Italy	14.02	
7	5	Cédric Lavanne	France	14.17	
8	1	Alexandros Stavridis	Cyprus	14.20	

=== 400 meters hurdles ===
Heats – 2 July

Rank	Heat	Name	Nationality	Time	Notes
1	2	Sébastien Maillard	France	50.08	Q
2	1	Mohamed Seghaier	Tunisia	50.83	Q, PB
3	1	Salah-Eddine Ghaidi	France	51.21	Q
4	1	Sotirios Iakovakis	Greece	51.21	Q, SB
5	2	Hamza Deyaf	Libya	51.24	Q, SB
6	1	Konstadinos Anastasiou	Greece	51.37	Q
7	1	Minas Alozides	Cyprus	51.49	q
8	2	Nicola Cascella	Italy	51.52	q, SB
9	2	Tuncay Örs	Turkey	51.91	
10	1	Abubaker Tawerghi	Libya	55.28	

Final – 3 July

Rank	Lane	Name	Nationality	Time	Notes
1st place, gold medalist(s)	3	Sébastien Maillard	France	49.80	SB
2nd place, silver medalist(s)	6	Salah-Eddine Ghaidi	France	50.10	SB
3rd place, bronze medalist(s)	7	Hamza Deyaf	Libya	50.21	PB
4	4	Mohamed Seghaier	Tunisia	51.25	
5	1	Nicola Cascella	Italy	51.33	SB
6	5	Sotirios Iakovakis	Greece	51.38	
	2	Minas Alozides	Cyprus	DNS	
	8	Konstadinos Anastasiou	Greece	DNS	

=== 3000 meters steeplechase ===
2 July

Rank	Name	Nationality	Time	Notes
1st place, gold medalist(s)	Jamel Chatbi	Morocco	8:13.11	GR
2nd place, silver medalist(s)	Chakir Boujattaoui	Morocco	8:13.83	PB
3rd place, bronze medalist(s)	Halil Akkaş	Turkey	8:30.84	SB
4	Yuri Floriani	Italy	8:34.60	SB
5	Matteo Villani	Italy	8:36.98	
6	José Luis Blanco	Spain	8:38.54	
7	Irba Lakhal	France	8:42.62	
	Mohamed-Khaled Belabbas	France	DNF	
	Alexandros Litsi	Greece	DNF	
	Eliseo Martín	Spain	DNS	

=== 4 × 100 meters relay ===
2 July

Rank	Lane	Nation	Competitors	Time	Notes
1st place, gold medalist(s)	6	Italy	Maurizio Checcucci, Simone Collio, Emanuele Di Gregorio, Fabio Cerutti	38.82	
2nd place, silver medalist(s)	5	France	Emmanuel Ngom Priso, Ydrissa M'Barke, Pierre-Alexis Pessonneaux, Christophe Bonnet	39.49	
3rd place, bronze medalist(s)	3	Turkey	Emrah Altunkalem, Ali Ekber Kayaş, Mustafa Delioğlu, Tuncay Örs	40.73	
4	4	Greece	Ioannis Apostolou, Lykourgos-Stefanos Tsakonas, Georgios Koutsotheodorou, Panagiotis Sarris	40.80	

=== 4 × 400 meters relay ===
3 July

Rank	Nation	Competitors	Time	Notes
1st place, gold medalist(s)	Spain	Aitor Martín, Santiago Ezquerro, Mark Ujakpor, Marc Orozco	3:06.19	SB
2nd place, silver medalist(s)	France	Yannick Fonsat, Akhenaton Silou, Salah-Eddine Ghaidi, Nicolas Fillon	3:06.28	
3rd place, bronze medalist(s)	Greece	Tilemachos Routas, Dimitrios Gravalos, Pantelis Melachroinoudis, Petros Kyriakidis	3:06.29	SB
4	Morocco	Marouane Maadadi, Abdelkrim Khoudri, Ismail Daif, Youness Belkaifa	3:06.54	
5	Italy	Marco Vistalli, Domenico Rao, Teo Turchi, Domenico Fontana	3:06.66	
6	Tunisia	Mohamed Amine Guezmil, Mohamed Seghaier, Houssem Tabel, Chouaib Chalbi	3:08.75	
7	Libya	Mohamed Khouaja, Hamza Deyaf, Abubaker Tawerghi, Aboubaker Elghatruni	3:10.00	
8	Turkey	Yahya ışık, Hamza Deyaf, Emrah Altunkalem, Ali Ekber Kayaş	3:14.03	

=== 20 kilometers walk ===
30 June

Rank	Name	Nationality	Time	Notes
1st place, gold medalist(s)	Ivano Brugnetti	Italy	1:22:33	GB
2nd place, silver medalist(s)	Giorgio Rubino	Italy	1:22:34	
3rd place, bronze medalist(s)	Juan Manuel Molina	Spain	1:23:02	SB
4	Hassanine Sebei	Tunisia	1:23:32	SB
5	Ali Amrouch	Algeria	1:23:32	
6	Alexandros Papamichail	Greece	1:28:04	
7	Antonin Boyez	France	1:31:04	
8	Theodoros Kefalopoulos	Greece	1:32:03	
9	Predrag Filipović	Serbia	1:34:29	
10	Eddy Roze	France	1:34:58	
11	Hedi Teraoui	Tunisia	1:44:18	
	Nenad Filipović	Serbia	DNF	
	Hichem Medjeber	Algeria	DQ	

=== High jump ===
1 July

Rank	Athlete	Nationality	2.05	2.10	2.15	2.18	2.21	2.24	2.26	2.28	2.30	2.32	Result	Notes
1st place, gold medalist(s)	Kyriakos Ioannou	Cyprus	–	o	–	–	xo	o	xxo	–	o	x–	2.30	GR
2nd place, silver medalist(s)	Konstadinos Baniotis	Greece	–	–	o	–	xo	xxo	–	o	x–	xx	2.28	
3rd place, bronze medalist(s)	Dragutin Topić	Serbia	–	–	xo	–	o	–	xo	x–	xx		2.26	
4	Filippo Campioli	Italy	–	o	o	o	o	o	xxx				2.24	
5	Giulio Ciotti	Italy	o	o	xo	xo	xxo	xxo	xxx				2.24	
6	Javier Bermejo	Spain	–	o	–	o	o	xxx					2.21	
7	Karim Samir Lofty	Egypt	–	o	o	xo	xo	xxx					2.21	
8	Mustafa Onur Demir	Turkey	–	o	xxo	xxx							2.15	
9	Majed Aldin Gazal	Syria	xo	o	xxo	xxx							2.15	
10	Nikolaos Gkiosis	Greece	o	o	xxx								2.10	
11	Branko Djuricić	Serbia	xxo	o	xxx								2.10	
12	Mickaël Diaz	France	o	xxo	xxx								2.10	
	Abdoulaye Diarra	France	–	xxx									NM	

=== Long jump ===
3 July

Rank	Athlete	Nationality	#1	#2	#3	#4	#5	#6	Result	Notes
1st place, gold medalist(s)	Salim Sdiri	France	7.84	x	7.80	x	8.07	8.29	8.29	GR
2nd place, silver medalist(s)	Yahya Berrabah	Morocco	8.01	7.99	7.92	8.17	8.20	8.23	8.23	
3rd place, bronze medalist(s)	Louis Tsatoumas	Greece	x	8.18	8.20	8.15	x	x	8.20	SB
4	Kafétien Gomis	France	7.72	7.31	7.67	7.96	x	x	7.96	
5	Issam Nima	Algeria	7.48	7.42	7.63	7.71	7.62	7.87	7.87	
6	Dimitrios Diamantaras	Greece	7.48	x	7.52	7.67	x	x	7.67	
7	Alaeddine Ben Hassine	Tunisia	7.66	7.34	7.56	7.35	7.53	7.23	7.66	
8	Stefano Tremigliozzi	Italy	7.55	x	7.62	x	5.64	x	7.62	
9	Tarik Bouguetaïb	Morocco	7.28	7.25	7.31				7.31	
10	Luca Maccapani	San Marino	6.77	x	x				6.77	
11	Mohamed Rihani	Libya	x	6.64	x				6.64	
12	Antony de Sevelinges	Monaco	6.06	6.05	5.98				6.06	
	Mohmed Elamari	Libya	x	–	–				NM	

=== Triple jump ===
30 June

Rank	Athlete	Nationality	#1	#2	#3	#4	#5	#6	Result	Notes
1st place, gold medalist(s)	Fabrizio Schembri	Italy	16.89	16.70	17.09	–	–	16.84	17.09	
2nd place, silver medalist(s)	Dimitrios Tsiamis	Greece	16.13	x	16.77	x	15.66	16.98	16.98	SB
3rd place, bronze medalist(s)	Daniele Greco	Italy	15.41	15.31	16.26	16.28	x	16.64	16.64	
4	Jules Lechanga	France	15.75	16.24	16.18	16.26	15.66	16.37	16.37	
5	Julien-Pierre Kapek	France	14.49	x	16.14	x	16.10	16.10	16.14	
6	Nikolaos Dontas	Greece	x	x	x	15.92	16.10	15.87	16.10	
7	Tarik Bouguetaïb	Morocco	15.55	x	x	15.84	15.55	x	15.84	
8	Hassan Bazzine	Morocco	15.19	15.30	x	x	14.65	14.53	15.30	

=== Shot put ===
3 July

Rank	Athlete	Nationality	#1	#2	#3	#4	#5	#6	Result	Notes
1st place, gold medalist(s)	Manuel Martínez	Spain	19.86	20.08	20.18	x	20.30	20.06	20.30	SB
2nd place, silver medalist(s)	Hamza Alić	Bosnia and Herzegovina	20.05	x	19.75	19.86	x	19.99	20.05	
3rd place, bronze medalist(s)	Nedžad Mulabegović	Croatia	19.85	19.32	x	19.65	19.42	19.84	19.85	
4	Yves Niaré	France	19.00	x	19.32	19.48	19.71	x	19.71	
5	Gaëtan Bucki	France	18.59	18.75	18.74	x	x	x	18.75	
6	Andreas Anastasopoulos	Greece	17.81	17.79	18.73	x	x	x	18.73	SB
7	Yasser Ibrahim Farag	Egypt	17.49	17.87	18.56	x	x	–	18.56	
8	Michalis Stamatogiannis	Greece	18.08	18.05	18.15	18.18	x	18.22	18.22	
9	Kemal Mešić	Bosnia and Herzegovina	17.23	17.96	x				17.96	
10	Georgios Arestis	Cyprus	16.66	x	17.71				17.71	
11	Adriatik Hoxha	Albania	x	15.84	16.02				16.02	

=== Discus throw ===
1 July

Rank	Athlete	Nationality	#1	#2	#3	#4	#5	#6	Result	Notes
1st place, gold medalist(s)	Frank Casañas	Spain	65.58	x	x	62.19	x	65.03	65.58	GR
2nd place, silver medalist(s)	Ercüment Olgundeniz	Turkey	63.48	63.35	x	–	–	–	63.48	SB
3rd place, bronze medalist(s)	Yasser Ibrahim Farag	Egypt	59.19	59.93	61.07	58.64	57.67	58.36	61.07	
4	Hannes Kirchler	Italy	59.13	59.41	60.93	58.52	58.72	x	60.93	
5	Spyridon Arampatzis	Greece	58.95	57.89	56.32	x	60.54	60.82	60.82	
6	Martin Marić	Croatia	57.57	55.40	60.60	58.52	x	x	60.60	
7	Apostolos Parellis	Cyprus	x	59.27	56.53	58.19	60.12	x	60.12	
8	Stefanos Konstas	Greece	x	55.93	x	58.51	58.81	x	58.81	
9	Ali Ali	Libya	51.31	58.81	x				58.81	
10	Nabil Kirame	Morocco	x	x	53.52				53.52	
11	Petros Mitisdes	Cyprus	x	47.02	x				47.02	
	Omar Ahmed El Ghazaly	Egypt							DNS	
	Giovanni Faloci	Italy							DNS	

=== Hammer throw ===
2 July

Rank	Athlete	Nationality	#1	#2	#3	#4	#5	#6	Result	Notes
1st place, gold medalist(s)	Nicola Vizzoni	Italy	75.46	75.92	x	75.15	75.32	74.25	75.92	
2nd place, silver medalist(s)	Jérôme Bortoluzzi	France	69.36	70.97	70.25	73.73	71.88	73.34	73.73	
3rd place, bronze medalist(s)	Alexandros Papadimitriou	Greece	73.27	73.00	73.69	70.89	72.89	73.20	73.69	
4	Eşref Apak	Turkey	72.44	71.99	x	73.56	72.92	73.34	73.56	
5	Mohsen Anani	Egypt	70.92	70.25	71.58	70.76	70.40	x	71.58	
6	Fatih Eryildirim	Turkey	67.28	70.30	x	66.98	71.44	69.58	71.44	
7	Andras Haklits	Croatia	70.35	x	x	70.62	71.31	x	71.31	
8	Frédéric Pouzy	France	71.23	69.63	68.02	70.28	69.93	x	71.23	
9	Stamatios Papantoniou	Greece	x	62.56	68.00				68.00	
10	Idriss Barid	Morocco	64.17	62.97	x				64.17	
	Marco Lingua	Italy	x	x	x				NM	

=== Javelin throw ===
30 June

Rank	Athlete	Nationality	#1	#2	#3	#4	#5	#6	Result	Notes
1st place, gold medalist(s)	Fatih Avan	Turkey	77.50	73.97	79.78	75.01	–	78.39	79.78	PB
2nd place, silver medalist(s)	Spyros Lempesis	Greece	75.39	78.66	x	x	74.33	78.39	78.66	PB
3rd place, bronze medalist(s)	Matija Kranjc	Slovenia	77.82	72.99	73.74	73.99	73.33	70.88	77.82	
4	Ioannis-Georgios Smalios	Greece	73.48	70.96	75.24	x	72.78	72.65	75.24	SB
5	Ehab Abdelrahman	Egypt	71.79	74.47	x	x	x	71.04	74.47	
6	Beranger Demerval	France	71.82	74.09	x	71.14	–	68.90	74.09	
7	Vitolio Tipotio	France	x	72.16	72.93	x	72.91	71.13	72.93	SB
8	Mohamed Ali Kbabou	Tunisia	65.71	68.80	70.75	69.32	68.77	65.64	70.75	
9	Roberto Bertolini	Italy	70.16	x	x				70.16	
10	Ioannis Stylianou	Cyprus	60.74	60.03	65.01				65.01	
11	Panagiotis Kalogirou	Cyprus	62.19	–	–				62.19	

== Women's results ==
=== 100 meters ===
Heats – 1 July
Wind:
Heat 1: +1.3 m/s, Heat 2: +1.8 m/s

Rank	Heat	Name	Nationality	Time	Notes
1	1	Myriam Soumaré	France	11.36	Q, PB
2	1	Georgia Kokloni	Greece	11.37	Q, SB
3	1	Eleni Artymata	Cyprus	11.45	Q, PB
4	1	Tina Murn	Slovenia	11.48	q, PB
5	1	Maria Aurora Salvagno	Italy	11.50	q, PB
6	2	Ayodelé Ikuesan	France	11.57	Q, SB
7	2	Pia Tajnikar	Slovenia	11.61	Q, SB
8	2	Anita Pistone	Italy	11.61	Q, SB
9	2	Maja Golub	Croatia	11.65	
10	2	Anna-Ramona Papaioannou	Cyprus	12.03	
11	1	Alsaleh Mounira	Syria	12.06	
	2	Maria Karastamati	Greece	DNS	

Final – 1 July
Wind:
+1.0 m/s

Rank	Lane	Name	Nationality	Time	Notes
1st place, gold medalist(s)	5	Georgia Kokloni	Greece	11.41	
2nd place, silver medalist(s)	4	Myriam Soumaré	France	11.46	
3rd place, bronze medalist(s)	7	Eleni Artymata	Cyprus	11.55	
3rd place, bronze medalist(s)	7	Ayodelé Ikuesan	France	11.55	SB
5	2	Tina Murn	Slovenia	11.58	
6	1	Maria Aurora Salvagno	Italy	11.61	
7	8	Anita Pistone	Italy	11.66	
8	6	Pia Tajnikar	Slovenia	11.66	

=== 200 meters ===
Heats – 1 July
Wind:
Heat 1: +0.4 m/s, Heat 2: +1.3 m/s

Rank	Heat	Name	Nationality	Time	Notes
1	2	Eleni Artymata	Cyprus	23.35	Q
2	2	Nelly Banco	France	23.70	Q, SB
3	2	Sabina Veit	Slovenia	23.71	Q
4	1	Maria Karastamati	Greece	23.73	Q, PB
5	1	Vincenza Calì	Italy	23.75	Q
6	2	Giulia Arcioni	Italy	23.80	q, SB
6	1	Aurélie Kamga	France	23.80	Q
8	1	Estela García	Spain	23.89	q
9	1	Andrianna Ferra	Greece	24.46	
10	2	Alsaleh Mounira	Syria	24.49	
	1	Salwa Saleh	Syria	DNS	

Final – 1 July
Wind:
+0.4 m/s

Rank	Lane	Name	Nationality	Time	Notes
1st place, gold medalist(s)	3	Eleni Artymata	Cyprus	23.16	PB
2nd place, silver medalist(s)	8	Sabina Veit	Slovenia	23.45	SB
3rd place, bronze medalist(s)	5	Vincenza Calì	Italy	23.49	
4	6	Nelly Banco	France	23.83	
5	2	Giulia Arcioni	Italy	23.89	
6	7	Aurélie Kamga	France	23.98	
7	4	Maria Karastamati	Greece	24.21	
8	1	Estela García	Spain	24.29	

=== 400 meters ===
Heats – 1 July

Rank	Heat	Name	Nationality	Time	Notes
1	2	Symphora Béhi	France	52.77	Q
2	2	Daniela Reina	Italy	52.90	Q
3	2	Agni Derveni	Greece	53.63	Q
4	2	Anita Banović	Croatia	53.91	q, SB
5	1	Libania Grenot	Italy	54.12	Q
6	1	Aurélie Kamga	France	54.27	Q
7	1	Zahra Bouras	Algeria	54.40	Q
8	1	Danijela Grgić	Croatia	54.67	q
9	2	Natalia Romero	Spain	54.68	PB
10	1	Begoña Garrido	Spain	55.30	
11	1	Aikaterini Syrou	Greece	57.16	
	1	Jasna Horizić	Bosnia and Herzegovina	DNS	
	2	Salwa Saleh	Syria	DNS	

Final – 2 July

Rank	Lane	Name	Nationality	Time	Notes
1st place, gold medalist(s)	4	Libania Grenot	Italy	50.30	GR
2nd place, silver medalist(s)	5	Daniela Reina	Italy	52.34	
3rd place, bronze medalist(s)	3	Aurélie Kamga	France	53.26	PB
4	6	Symphora Béhi	France	53.42	
5	1	Anita Banović	Croatia	53.57	SB
6	7	Agni Derveni	Greece	53.89	
7	8	Zahra Bouras	Algeria	54.24	
	2	Danijela Grgić	Croatia	DNS	

=== 800 meters ===
Heats – 1 July

Rank	Heat	Name	Nationality	Time	Notes
1	2	Linda Marguet	France	2:04.43	Q, SB
2	1	Halima Hachlaf	Morocco	2:04.55	Q
3	1	Yeliz Kurt	Turkey	2:05.03	Q
4	1	Eleni Filandra	Greece	2:05.33	Q
5	2	Elisa Cusma Piccione	Italy	2:05.57	Q
6	1	Somaya Bousaid	Tunisia	2:05.58	q
7	1	Chiara Nichetti	Italy	2:07.67	q
8	2	Eleni Theodorakopoulou	Greece	2:08.63	Q
9	2	Nagah Zentani	Libya	2:35.12	
	2	Hasna Benhassi	Morocco	DNS	

Final – 2 July

Rank	Name	Nationality	Time	Notes
1st place, gold medalist(s)	Elisa Cusma Piccione	Italy	1:59.87	GR
2nd place, silver medalist(s)	Halima Hachlaf	Morocco	2:00.91	PB
3rd place, bronze medalist(s)	Eleni Filandra	Greece	2:01.13	PB
4	Linda Marguet	France	2:01.73	PB
5	Yeliz Kurt	Turkey	2:01.90	
6	Somaya Bousaid	Tunisia	2:03.27	
7	Chiara Nichetti	Italy	2:03.45	SB
8	Eleni Theodorakopoulou	Greece	2:06.05	

=== 1500 meters ===
2 July

Rank	Name	Nationality	Time	Notes
1st place, gold medalist(s)	Elisa Cusma Piccione	Italy	4:11.88	
2nd place, silver medalist(s)	Btissam Lakhouad	Morocco	4:12.07	
3rd place, bronze medalist(s)	Habiba Ghribi	Tunisia	4:12.37	PB
4	Siham Hilali	Morocco	4:12.83	
5	Irene Alfonso	Spain	4:15.22	SB
6	Eva Arias	Spain	4:15.80	
7	Fanjanteino Félix	France	4:15.96	
8	Agnes Tschurtschenthaler	Italy	4:17.81	
9	Safa Aissaoui	Tunisia	4:18.11	SB
10	Sonja Stolić	Serbia	4:19.75	SB
11	Maria Kladou	Greece	4:24.00	
12	Maria Panou	Greece	4:26.66	SB

=== 5000 meters ===
1 July

Rank	Name	Nationality	Time	Notes
1st place, gold medalist(s)	Hanane Ouhaddou	Morocco	15:12.75	PB
2nd place, silver medalist(s)	Elena Romagnolo	Italy	15:13.19	PB
3rd place, bronze medalist(s)	Silvia Weissteiner	Italy	15:15.95	SB
4	Judith Plá	Spain	15:36.86	
5	Sonja Stolić	Serbia	15:43.83	
6	Maria Larhrissi	Morocco	16:00.48	
7	Christine Bardelle	France	16:03.94	
	Dudu Karakaya	Turkey	DNF	

=== 10,000 meters ===
30 June

Rank	Name	Nationality	Time	Notes
1st place, gold medalist(s)	Elvan Abeylegesse	Turkey	31:51.98	
2nd place, silver medalist(s)	Olivera Jevtić	Serbia	32:23.06	
3rd place, bronze medalist(s)	Kenza Dahmani	Algeria	32:23.06	SB

=== Half marathon ===
3 July

Rank	Name	Nationality	Time	Notes
1st place, gold medalist(s)	Anna Incerti	Italy	1:12:25	
2nd place, silver medalist(s)	Rosaria Console	Italy	1:12:34	
3rd place, bronze medalist(s)	Kenza Dahmani	Algeria	1:12:39	
4	Bahar Dogman	Turkey	1:14:20	
5	Gloria Marconi	Italy	1:14:30	
6	Samira Raïf	Morocco	1:15:26	
7	Asmae Leghzaoui	Morocco	1:16:53	
8	Magdalini Gazea	Greece	1:17:38	
	Mehtap Sızmaz	Turkey	DNF	
	Olivera Jevtić	Serbia	DNS	

=== 100 meters hurdles ===
Heats – 1 July
Wind:
Heat 1: +0.3 m/s, Heat 2: +0.5 m/s

Rank	Heat	Name	Nationality	Time	Notes
1	1	Sandra Gomis	France	13.01	Q
2	2	Nevin Yanıt	Turkey	13.04	Q
3	2	Glory Alozie	Spain	13.22	Q
4	2	Alice Decaux	France	13.25	Q
5	1	Micol Cattaneo	Italy	13.30	Q
6	1	Evmorfia Baourda	Cyprus	13.36	Q
7	1	Marina Tomić	Slovenia	13.54	q
8	2	Olympia Petsoudi	Greece	13.69	q
9	1	Gorana Cvijetić	Bosnia and Herzegovina	14.23	SB
10	2	Polixeni Irodotou	Cyprus	14.35	
	1	Flora Redoumi	Greece	DNS	

Final – 2 July
Wind:
–0.1 m/s

Rank	Lane	Name	Nationality	Time	Notes
1st place, gold medalist(s)	5	Nevin Yanıt	Turkey	13.08	
2nd place, silver medalist(s)	4	Sandra Gomis	France	13.24	
3rd place, bronze medalist(s)	6	Micol Cattaneo	Italy	13.39	
4	3	Glory Alozie	Spain	13.42	
5	7	Evmorfia Baourda	Cyprus	13.51	
6	2	Marina Tomić	Slovenia	13.61	
7	1	Olympia Petsoudi	Greece	13.73	
	8	Alice Decaux	France	DQ	IAAF 162.6

=== 400 meters hurdles ===
1 July

Rank	Lane	Name	Nationality	Time	Notes
1st place, gold medalist(s)	8	Phara Anacharsis	France	56.66	PB
2nd place, silver medalist(s)	7	Aurore Kassambara	France	56.89	
3rd place, bronze medalist(s)	3	Nikolina Horvat	Croatia	56.97	SB
4	5	Benedetta Ceccarelli	Italy	57.15	
5	4	Hayat Lambarki	Morocco	57.75	PB
6	6	Laia Forcadell	Spain	57.85	SB
7	2	Gorana Cvijetić	Bosnia and Herzegovina	1:01.02	SB

=== 4 × 100 meters relay ===
2 July

Rank	Lane	Nation	Competitors	Time	Notes
1st place, gold medalist(s)	6	France	Myriam Soumaré, Ayodelé Ikuesan, Nelly Banco, Émilie Gaydu	43.79	SB
2nd place, silver medalist(s)	5	Italy	Anita Pistone, Maria Aurora Salvagno, Giulia Arcioni, Vincenza Calì	43.86	
3rd place, bronze medalist(s)	4	Greece	Maria Gatou, Agni Derveni, Andrianna Ferra, Georgia Kokloni	45.45	
4	3	Cyprus	Maria Savva, Anna-Ramona Papaioannou, Evmorfia Baourda, Polixeni Irodotou	46.91	

=== High jump ===
3 July

Rank	Athlete	Nationality	1.70	1.75	1.80	1.83	1.86	1.89	1.91	1.93	1.97	2.01	Result	Notes
1st place, gold medalist(s)	Antonietta Di Martino	Italy	–	–	–	o	–	o	–	xxo	xo	x	1.97	
2nd place, silver medalist(s)	Burcu Ayhan	Turkey	–	o	o	o	xo	o	xxx				1.89	PB
3rd place, bronze medalist(s)	Antonia Stergiou	Greece	–	o	o	o	o	xo	xxx				1.89	
4	Ezgi Sevilmiş	Turkey	–	o	o	o	o	xxx					1.86	
5	Maroula Papageorgiou	Greece	–	o	xxx								1.75	
5	Marija Vuković	Montenegro	o	o	xxx								1.75	

=== Pole vault ===
30 June

Rank	Athlete	Nationality	3.60	3.80	3.90	4.00	4.10	4.20	4.25	4.30	4.35	4.40	4.45	4.50	4.60	Result	Notes
1st place, gold medalist(s)	Nikoleta Kyriakopoulou	Greece	–	–	–	–	xo	–	xo	–	xo	–	xxo	xxo	xxx	4.50	GR
2nd place, silver medalist(s)	Marianna Zachariadi	Cyprus	–	–	–	o	o	xo	–	o	o	xx–	o	xxx		4.45	PB
3rd place, bronze medalist(s)	Anna Giordano Bruno	Italy	–	–	o	–	xo	o	–	xo	x–	xx				4.30	
4	Tina Šutej	Slovenia	–	xo	–	o	xo	xo	xxx							4.20	
5	Alixe Auvray	France	–	o	–	o	xo	xxx								4.10	
6	Elena Scarpellini	Italy	–	–	o	o	xxx									4.00	
7	Nissrin Dinar	Morocco	xo	xxo	o	xxx										3.90	SB
	Georgia Cheirimperi	Greece	–	xxx												NM	

=== Long jump ===
1 July

Rank	Athlete	Nationality	#1	#2	#3	#4	#5	#6	Result	Notes
1st place, gold medalist(s)	Tania Vicenzino	Italy	6.54	6.51	6.29	x	x	x	6.54	PB
2nd place, silver medalist(s)	Karin Melis Mey	Turkey	6.15	6.11	6.53	6.39	6.43	6.31	6.53	
3rd place, bronze medalist(s)	Nina Kolarič	Slovenia	6.33	6.24	x	6.50	6.37	6.27	6.50	
4	Eleni Kafourou	Greece	6.00	6.20	x	6.27	6.27	6.24	6.27	
5	Nektaria Panayi	Cyprus	5.72	5.86	5.60	5.69	5.93	5.69	5.93	
6	Jamaa Chnaik	Morocco	5.89	x	x	5.76	5.85	5.87	5.89	
7	Milena Milašević	Montenegro	5.61	5.67	5.48	5.75	5.75	5.66	5.75	
8	Irene Charalambous	Cyprus	x	5.47	5.48	–	–	–	5.48	
9	Athanasia Perra	Greece	x	x	5.47				5.47	

=== Triple jump ===
2 July

Rank	Athlete	Nationality	#1	#2	#3	#4	#5	#6	Result	Notes
1st place, gold medalist(s)	Athanasia Perra	Greece	14.35	14.44	x	14.40	14.37	14.62	14.62	PB
2nd place, silver medalist(s)	Teresa Nzola Meso Ba	France	14.01	13.77	13.54	14.08	13.83	14.16	14.16	
3rd place, bronze medalist(s)	Paraskevi Papahristou	Greece	13.16	14.12	x	x	13.87	13.03	14.12	
4	Magdelín Martínez	Italy	14.11	13.90	x	x	13.87	–	14.11	
5	Snežana Rodić	Slovenia	14.02	x	14.10	14.03	13.72	x	14.10	
6	Amy Zongo	France	13.56	13.94	x	13.85	x	x	13.94	
7	Jamaa Chnaik	Morocco	13.36	13.25	13.23	13.04	13.30	13.31	13.36	

=== Shot put ===
2 July

Rank	Athlete	Nationality	#1	#2	#3	#4	#5	#6	Result	Notes
1st place, gold medalist(s)	Jessica Cérival	France	16.93	17.24	16.78	17.05	17.77	x	17.77	
2nd place, silver medalist(s)	Assunta Legnante	Italy	16.75	17.21	17.44	17.39	17.31	16.82	17.44	
3rd place, bronze medalist(s)	Chiara Rosa	Italy	17.24	16.94	17.01	x	x	17.19	17.24	
4	Irini Terzoglou	Greece	16.94	16.88	x	16.65	x	x	16.94	
5	Filiz Kadoğan	Turkey	16.27	x	16.14	16.78	x	16.61	16.78	
6	Chrysi Moysidou	Greece	14.23	14.93	14.92	15.06	14.92	14.57	15.06	

=== Discus throw ===
3 July

Rank	Athlete	Nationality	#1	#2	#3	#4	#5	#6	Result	Notes
1st place, gold medalist(s)	Mélina Robert-Michon	France	56.75	60.86	57.95	61.17	x	x	61.17	
2nd place, silver medalist(s)	Vera Begić	Croatia	56.63	60.29	59.58	x	58.39	58.71	60.29	
3rd place, bronze medalist(s)	Dragana Tomašević	Serbia	56.92	x	x	56.29	56.57	58.73	58.73	
4	Laura Bordignon	Italy	58.33	x	57.43	57.98	57.12	57.81	58.33	
5	Valentina Aniballi	Italy	51.60	52.51	52.58	52.48	51.80	53.80	53.80	
6	Monia Kari	Tunisia	52.70	53.60	52.97	53.20	x	52.67	53.60	
7	Dorothea Kalpakidou	Greece	52.11	x	53.22	53.27	x	x	53.27	
8	Evangelia Sofani	Greece	51.14	x	52.08	52.94	50.89	50.47	52.94	
9	Alexandra Klatsia	Cyprus	46.09	x	45.49				46.09	
10	Ebtihal Abboud	Libya	37.27	39.20	x				39.20	

=== Hammer throw ===
30 June

Rank	Athlete	Nationality	#1	#2	#3	#4	#5	#6	Result	Notes
1st place, gold medalist(s)	Silvia Salis	Italy	66.23	68.17	x	70.39	66.78	x	70.39	
2nd place, silver medalist(s)	Clarissa Claretti	Italy	68.20	67.84	69.35	x	66.43	67.50	69.35	
3rd place, bronze medalist(s)	Styliani Papadopoulou	Greece	x	x	55.11	x	67.55	x	67.55	
4	Berta Castells	Spain	66.73	x	64.65	x	65.59	66.73	66.73	
5	Sviatlana Sudak	Turkey	64.19	66.14	x	65.49	66.52	63.26	66.52	
6	Amélie Perrin	France	64.82	64.65	66.09	64.41	x	x	66.09	
7	Alexandra Papageorgiou	Greece	65.24	63.89	62.39	65.42	64.47	63.67	65.42	
8	Paraskevi Theodorou	Cyprus	53.58	x	x	61.95	x	60.63	61.95	
	Stéphanie Falzon	France	x	x	x				NM	

=== Javelin throw ===
2 July

Rank	Athlete	Nationality	#1	#2	#3	#4	#5	#6	Result	Notes
1st place, gold medalist(s)	Voisava Lika	Greece	60.39	57.49	x	x	55.98	60.97	60.97	SB
2nd place, silver medalist(s)	Zahra Bani	Italy	49.98	57.42	x	x	55.37	60.65	60.65	SB
3rd place, bronze medalist(s)	Martinka Ratej	Slovenia	59.08	54.33	x	x	54.24	56.71	59.08	
4	Panagiota Touloumtzi	Greece	48.28	50.44	x	x	x	52.28	52.28	
5	Eleni Mavroudi	Cyprus	43.69	x	48.50	x	44.24	49.45	49.45	
6	Jelena Cudanov	Serbia	40.92	x	41.53	x	40.82	x	41.53	
