= Andreas Mokdasi =

Swedish sprinter (born 1984)

Andreas Mokdasi (born 8 May 1984) is a Swedish sprinter who specialized in the 400 metres. His highest international placement was a fourth place in the 4 × 400 metres relay at the 2006 World Indoor Championships. He also competed at one European Championships, took one Swedish title outdoors and three indoors.

== Career ==
In the age-specific competitions, Mokdasi competed at the 2001 European Youth Olympic Festival, the 2003 European Junior Championships and the 2005 European U23 Championships (both 400 metres and relay without reaching the final.

Mokdasi lowered his personal best time by 0.5–1 second every year, via 49.08 (2001) to 48.08 (2002), 47.39 (2003) and 46.79 (2004). He won the Swedish Junior Championships in 2002, followed by a double including the 200 metres in 2003, and also won several Nordic junior competitions. He took the Swedish Indoor Championships bronze in 2003, and at the Swedish Championships he took bronze in 2002, silver in 2003, and gold in 2004. The latter was done in the time of 46.79 seconds, which he equalled at the DN Galan in 2005 and which remained his lifetime best. He represented the club Hässelby SK.

In 2005 he finished fourth both at the Swedish indoor and outdoor championship. He also helped win the relay at the 2005 European Cup First League, but missed out on a relay spot at the 2005 World Championships since Thomas Nikitin beat him at the aforementioned DN Galan; Mokdasi was selected as the relay team's reserve. Then, at the back of winning the 2006 Swedish Indoor Championships, Mokdasi was selected for the Swedish 4 × 400 metres relay team at the 2006 World Indoor Championships together with Johan Wissman, Joni Jaako and Mattias Claesson. The quartet ran in 3:07.10 minutes in the heats, smashing the previous Swedish indoor record which was 3:10.09 minutes. The final ended in 3:07.32 minutes and a fourth place.

The outdoor season entailed another fourth place at the Swedish championships, before he also participated in the relay at the 2006 European Championships. Being held on home soil in Gothenburg, the relay team failed to make it past the heat. A bad baton pass between Mokdasi and Thomas Nikitin was mainly to blame.

Between 2007 and 2011, Mokdasi took one silver and two bronze at the Swedish championships, won the 2008 Swedish indoor championships and also won two indoor silver medals. His competitions abroad became more rare, but finished sixth in the relay at the 2009 European Team Championships Super League and also ran in the relay at the 2010 European Team Championships First League.
