= 2004 World Junior Championships in Athletics – Men's 400 metres hurdles =

The men's 400 metres hurdles event at the 2004 World Junior Championships in Athletics was held in Grosseto, Italy, at Stadio Olimpico Carlo Zecchini on 14, 15 and 16 July.

== Medalists ==
Gold	Kerron Clement; United States
Silver	Brandon Johnson; United States
Bronze	Ibrahim Al-Hamaidi; Saudi Arabia

== Results ==
=== Final ===
16 July

Rank	Name	Nationality	Time	Notes
1st place, gold medalist(s)	Kerron Clement	United States	48.51	
2nd place, silver medalist(s)	Brandon Johnson	United States	48.62	
3rd place, bronze medalist(s)	Ibrahim Al-Hamaidi	Saudi Arabia	48.94	
4	Louis van Zyl	South Africa	49.06	
5	Yasser Lismet	Cuba	50.24	
6	Wouter Le Roux	South Africa	51.17	
7	Richard Davenport	United Kingdom	51.59	
8	Diego Venâncio	Brazil	52.07	

=== Semifinals ===
15 July

==== Semifinal 1 ====
Rank	Name	Nationality	Time	Notes
1	Ibrahim Al-Hamaidi	Saudi Arabia	49.55	Q
2	Richard Davenport	United Kingdom	50.20	Q
3	Diego Venâncio	Brazil	50.85	Q
4	Yasser Lismet	Cuba	50.96	Q
5	Víctor Solarte	Venezuela	51.69	
6	Michaël Bultheel	Belgium	52.21	
7	Markino Buckley	Jamaica	52.89	
	Nicola Cascella	Italy	DQ	IAAF rule 168.7

==== Semifinal 2 ====
Rank	Name	Nationality	Time	Notes
1	Kerron Clement	United States	49.01	Q
2	Brandon Johnson	United States	49.78	Q
3	Louis van Zyl	South Africa	50.11	Q
4	Wouter Le Roux	South Africa	50.32	Q
5	El Hadj Sethe Mbow	Senegal	50.68	
6	Teemu Linkosaari	Finland	51.87	
7	Bandar Yahya Al-Sharahili	Saudi Arabia	51.92	
8	Go Tanabe	Japan	52.20	

=== Heats ===
14 July

==== Heat 1 ====
Rank	Name	Nationality	Time	Notes
1	Yasser Lismet	Cuba	51.27	Q
2	Louis van Zyl	South Africa	51.30	Q
3	Michaël Bultheel	Belgium	51.46	Q
4	Nicola Cascella	Italy	51.47	q
5	Markino Buckley	Jamaica	52.03	q
6	Aleksandr Tishkin	Russia	52.15	
7	Teppei Suzuki	Japan	52.24	
8	Chung Cheng-Kang	Chinese Taipei	53.66	

==== Heat 2 ====
Rank	Name	Nationality	Time	Notes
1	Ibrahim Al-Hamaidi	Saudi Arabia	50.02	Q
2	Wouter Le Roux	South Africa	51.12	Q
3	Teemu Linkosaari	Finland	51.56	Q
4	Go Tanabe	Japan	52.01	q
5	Ryan Dinham	United Kingdom	52.86	
6	Balázs Molnár	Hungary	52.97	
7	Josef Robertson	Jamaica	53.05	
8	Fadil Bellaabouss	France	53.48	

==== Heat 3 ====
Rank	Name	Nationality	Time	Notes
1	Kerron Clement	United States	50.10	Q
2	Richard Davenport	United Kingdom	51.08	Q
3	El Hadj Sethe Mbow	Senegal	51.48	Q
4	Bandar Yahya Al-Sharahili	Saudi Arabia	51.63	q
5	Florent Joulain	France	52.74	
6	Tuncay Örs	Turkey	54.27	
7	Wang Hao-Yi	Chinese Taipei	55.26	

==== Heat 4 ====
Rank	Name	Nationality	Time	Notes
1	Brandon Johnson	United States	50.11	Q
2	Víctor Solarte	Venezuela	51.96	Q
3	Diego Venâncio	Brazil	52.02	Q
4	Ricardo Lima	Portugal	52.47	
5	Manuel García	Puerto Rico	52.82	
6	Yuriy Pelles	Israel	53.09	
7	Milan Kotur	Croatia	53.28	

== Participation ==
According to an unofficial count, 30 athletes from 22 countries participated in the event.

- Belgium (1)
- Brazil (1)
- Chinese Taipei (2)
- Croatia (1)
- Cuba (1)
- Finland (1)
- France (2)
- Hungary (1)
- Israel (1)
- Italy (1)
- Jamaica (2)
- Japan (2)
- Portugal (1)
- Puerto Rico (1)
- Russia (1)
- Saudi Arabia (2)
- Senegal (1)
- South Africa (2)
- Turkey (1)
- United Kingdom (2)
- United States (2)
- Venezuela (1)
