= 2004 Central American and Caribbean Junior Championships in Athletics =

XVI Central American and Caribbean Junior Championships
- Dates: 25–27 June
- Host city: Coatzacoalcos, Mexico
- Venue: Estadio Rafael Hernández Ochoa
- Level: Junior and Youth
- Events: 81 (43 junior, 38 youth)
- Participation: about 411 (223 junior, 188 youth) athletes from 21 nations

The 16th Central American and Caribbean Junior Championships were held in the Estadio Rafael Hernández Ochoa in Coatzacoalcos, Veracruz, Mexico, between 25–27 June 2004. The games were originally planned to be held in San Salvador, El Salvador. However, they were relocated to the state of Veracruz in Mexico in early 2004. Both cities of Xalapa and Coatzacoalcos were applicants. A discussion of the results is given.

== Records ==
A couple of new championship records were set.

Competition	Event	Record	Athlete	Country	Type
Boys Under 20 (Junior)	200 m	20.67s (1.2 m/s)	Marcus Duncan	Trinidad and Tobago	CR
Boys Under 20 (Junior)	Hammer throw (junior implement, 6 kg)	59.03m^{1)}	Santiago Loera	Mexico	CR
Girls Under 20 (Junior)	Shot put	15.74m	Annie Alexander	Trinidad and Tobago	CR
Boys Under 17 (Youth)	Octathlon	4832 pts^{2)}	Ramón Garibay	Mexico	CR

Key

AR — Area record • CR — Championship record • NR — National record

Notes:

^{1)}: A new (junior implement) hammer of 6 kg was used for the first time at the championships. Therefore, the mark of 59.03m is naturally a new championship record. However, Yosmel Montes from Cuba threw the hammer 65.88m using the (senior implement) 7.257 kg hammer during the 1996 championships.

^{2)}: The result of 14.91s in 110m hurdles was reported as wind-assisted (2.7 m/s).

Moreover, there were a couple of further results marked as championship records. However, they might be disputable as discussed below:

Event	Record	Athlete	Country	Type
Girls Under 20 (Junior)
rowspan = "3" Pole vault	3.35m^{3)}	Nidza Torres	Puerto Rico	CR
Carmen Castillo	3.35m^{3)}	Mexico		CR
Isadora García	3.35m^{3)}	Mexico		CR
Hammer throw	48.01m^{4)}	Mónica Coronado	Mexico	CR
Boys Under 17 (Youth)
Pole vault	3.95m^{5)}	Yeisel Cintrón	Puerto Rico	CR

Key

AR — Area record • CR — Championship record • NR — National record

Notes:

^{3)}: Citlalli Huerta from Mexico jumped 3.70m during the 2002 championships (marked as "Exhibition").

^{4)}: Violeta Guzmán of Mexico threw the hammer (4 kg as in this competition) 51.46m during the 1996 championships. The event was not held during the last championships in 2002, which might explain the mismatch.

^{5)}: Erik Corral of Mexico jumped 4.20m during the 1998 championships. Again, the event was not held during the last championships in 2002, which might explain the mismatch.

== Medal summary ==
The results are published.

=== Male Junior A (under 20) ===
Event	Gold		Silver		Bronze	
100 metres (1.6 m/s)	Daniel Bailey (ATG)	10.33	Marcus Duncan (TRI)	10.43	Yavid Zackey (PUR)	10.45
200 metres (1.2 m/s)	Marcus Duncan (TRI)	20.67 CR	Daniel Bailey (ATG)	20.81	Jamil James (TRI)	21.05
400 metres	Renny Quow (TRI)	47.62	Andretti Bain (BAH)	47.95	Nery Brenes (CRC)	48.05
800 metres	Simeon Bovell (TRI)	1:53.14	Davian Parker (JAM)	1:55.31	Jorge Zamora (MEX)	1:56.12
1500 metres	Isaías Haro (MEX)	3:49.04	Mario Vera (MEX)	3:57.98	Francis Jiménez (ESA)	3:59.49
5000 metres	Denides Vélez (PUR)	15:21.39	Alejandro Caltenco (MEX)	15:27.57	Juan Morales (PUR)	15:31.66
10,000 metres	César Méndez (MEX)	32:41.03	Elfego Sedano (MEX)	32:41.24	Bartolomé Sequén (GUA)	33:21.46
3000 m steeplechase	Josafath González (MEX)	9:25.02	Aarón Arias (MEX)	9:48.77	Marlon Monterrosa (ESA)	10:11.44
110 metres hurdles (3.9 m/s)	Patrick Lee (JAM)	14.37 w	Norhiher Marín (MEX)	14.53 w	Jesse King (BAR)	14.76 w
400 metres hurdles	Manuel García (PUR)	53.25	Markino Buckley (JAM)	53.30	Ronald Forbes (CAY)	53.80
High jump	Darvin Edwards (LCA)	2.09	Omar Wright (CAY)	2.09	Pedro Piñera (MEX)	2.06
Pole vault	José Montano (MEX)	5.00	Moisés Gómez (MEX)	4.50	Noel Feliciano (PUR)	4.00
Long jump	Lovintz Tota (BER)	7.23 (-2.4 m/s)	Jermaine Alphous Jackson (JAM)	7.06 (-0.2 m/s)	Henry Linton (CRC)	6.70 (0.6 m/s)
Triple jump	Ayata Joseph (ATG)	15.80 (-0.7 m/s)	Maxwell Álvarez (GUA)	15.01 (-1.3 m/s)	Luis Rivera (MEX)	14.56 (-1.6 m/s)
Shot put	Hickel Woolery (JAM)	16.66	Adonson Shallow (VIN)	16.55	Camoi Hood (JAM)	16.54
Discus throw	Hickel Woolery (JAM)	47.22	Camoi Hood (JAM)	45.74	Adonson Shallow (VIN)	45.10
Hammer throw	Santiago Loera (MEX)	59.03 CR	Roberto Sawyers (CRC)	57.56	Javier Villarreal (MEX)	56.55
Javelin throw	Kenley Olivas (NCA)	59.20	José Lagunes (MEX)	59.11	Carlos Morgan (CAY)	56.13
Decathlon	Marcos Sánchez (PUR)	6293	José Hernández (MEX)	6032	Miguel Juárez (MEX)	5923
10,000 metres track walk	Éder Sánchez (MEX)	43:21.99	Alejandro Rojas (MEX)	44:06.05	Hugo Céspedes (CRC)	61:44.56
4 × 100 metre relay	Jamaica; Kawayne Fisher; Kevin Stewart; Nesta Carter; Andre Wellington	40.63	Trinidad and Tobago	41.04	Bahamas; Don Wood; Michael Sands; Derek Carey; Tyrone Sawyer	41.04
4 × 400 metre relay	Trinidad and Tobago	3:10.97	Puerto Rico; Yavid Zackey; Marcos Sánchez; Manuel García; Félix Martínez	3:12.10	Jamaica; Leford Green; Michael Gardener; Andre Wellington; Markino Buckley	3:12.92

=== Female Junior A (under 20) ===
Event	Gold		Silver		Bronze	
100 metres (0.6 m/s)	Wanda Hutson (TRI)	11.46	Kelly Ann Baptiste (TRI)	11.50	Carol Rodríguez (PUR)	11.73
200 metres (2.7 m/s)	Kelly Ann Baptiste (TRI)	23.37 w	Nickesha Anderson (JAM)	23.50 w	Anastasia Le-Roy (JAM)	23.71 w
400 metres	Kineke Alexander (VIN)	53.93	Abigail David (TRI)	54.36	Nyoka Cole (JAM)	54.81
800 metres	Cristina Guevara (MEX)	2:12.92	Maresia Pencil (JAM)	2:15.93	Raquel Barquero (CRC)	2:22.48
1500 metres	Pilar McShine (TRI)	4:42.93	Liliani Méndez (PUR)	4:43.27	María Estrada (MEX)	4:44.05
3000 metres	María Estrada (MEX)	10:07.85	Liliani Méndez (PUR)	10:13.28	Anayeli Navarro (MEX)	10:16.63
5000 metres	Ana Rosa Fuentes (MEX)	18:43.28	Monserrat Zúñiga (MEX)	18:52.76	Xiomara Barrera (ESA)	20:25.41
100 metres hurdles (1.6 m/s)	Keisha Brown (JAM)	13.76	Diana Pérez (MEX)	15.05	Jéssica González (MEX)	15.08
400 metres hurdles	Jennifer Velázquez (PUR)	62.46	Trishana McGowan (JAM)	63.64	Nayeli Leyva (MEX)	64.75
High jump	Rhonda Watkins (TRI)	1.76	Zindzi Swan (BER)	1.76	Fabiola Ayala (MEX)	1.70
Pole vault	Nidza Torres (PUR)	3.35	Carmen Castillo (MEX)	3.35	Isadora García (MEX)	3.35
Long jump	Rhonda Watkins (TRI)	5.85 (-1.7 m/s)	Zindzi Swan (BER)	5.81 (-1.2 m/s)	Rosemarie White (JAM)	5.67 (-2.2 m/s)
Triple jump	Seidre Forde (BAR)	12.23 (-0.8 m/s)	Estela Díaz (MEX)	11.95 (-1.4 m/s)	Sharon Ruiz (CRC)	11.44 (-2.3 m/s)
Shot put	Annie Alexander (TRI)	15.74 CR	Tressa-Anne Charles (LCA)	14.67	Brittney Marshall (BER)	13.18
Discus throw	Keisha Walkes (BAR)	41.87	Sasha Ferguson (BAH)	41.59	María Padilla (MEX)	39.53
Hammer throw	Mónica Coronado (MEX)	48.01	Rita Nieves (PUR)	41.87	Gilmarie Ortíz (PUR)	39.53
Javelin throw	Coralys Ortíz (PUR)	48.45	Elizabeth Orozco (MEX)	41.59	Ana Encinas (MEX)	41.29
Heptathlon	Nadina Marsh (JAM)	5161	Yaritza Rivera (PUR)	4632	Cuquie Melville (TRI)	4465
5000 metres track walk	Rosa María Orozco (MEX)	25:00.74	Verónica Colindres (ESA)	25:35.12	Marandeliz Arroyo (PUR)	25:42.23
4 × 100 metres relay	Jamaica; Jody-Ann Powell; Tracy-Ann Rowe; Nickesha Anderson; Anastasia Le-Roy	44.85	Trinidad and Tobago; Jurlene Francis; Monique Cabral; Wanda Hutson; Kelly-Ann Baptiste	45.10	Mexico; Ana Martha Coutiño; Deneb Cervantes; Nayra Denisse Tienda; Zudikey Rodríguez	47.86
4 × 400 metres relay	Jamaica; Sharneter Stewart; Nickesha Anderson; Nyoka Cole; Trishana McGowan	3:40.40	Puerto Rico; Jennifer Velázquez; Zuliana Fontánez; Gilmarie Ortíz; Carol Rodríguez	3:44.87	Mexico; Ana Martha Coutiño; Nallely Vela; Nayeli Leyva; Viridiana Nájera	3:47.73

=== Male Junior B (under 17) ===
Event	Gold		Silver		Bronze	
100 metres (1.4 m/s)	Luis López (PUR)	10.78	Dario Alleyne (BAR)	10.81	Ramaldo Turner (JAM)	10.82
200 metres (4.5 m/s)	Dario Alleyne (BAR)	21.53 w	Withley Williams (SKN)	21.80 w	Luis López (PUR)	21.83 w
400 metres	Christian Santiago (PUR)	48.32	Romel Lewis (JAM)	49.01	Keneil Lee (JAM)	50.36
800 metres	Jamaal James (TRI)	1:53.93	Greivin González (CRC)	1:54.78	Lionel Omar Ayala (PUR)	1:59.15
1500 metres	José Pérez (MEX)	4:08.21	Diego Borrego (MEX)	4:08.26	Yasamel Rodríguez (PUR)	4:09.28
3000 metres	Diego Borrego (MEX)	8:43.68	Juan Carrera (MEX)	8:44.77	Luis Velázquez (PUR)	9:36.29
2000 metres steeplechase	Juan Flores (MEX)	6:04.73	Luis Velázquez (PUR)	6:12.63	Francisco González (MEX)	6:13.74
100 metres hurdles (2.5 m/s)	Ryan Brathwaite (BAR)	13.20 w	Akeem Smith (JAM)	13.52 w	Ronnie Griffith (BAR)	13.60 w
400 metres hurdles	Víctor Valentín (PUR)	54.35	Christopher Adderley (BAH)	54.47	Víctor García (MEX)	56.09
High jump	Jahmal Strachan (BAH)	1.96	Sheldon King (BAH)	1.96	Jade Darrell (BER); Alejandro Olmedo (ESA)	1.85; 1.85
Pole vault	Yeisel Cintrón (PUR)	3.95jo	Edwin Barrientos (GUA)	3.90	David Díaz (PUR)	3.90
Long jump	Nicholas Gordon (JAM)	6.65 (-1.5 m/s)	Paul Espino (MEX)	6.54 (-2.4 m/s)	Marcos Amalbert (PUR)	6.49 (-1.6 m/s)
Triple jump	Nicholas Gordon (JAM)	13.88 (-1.8 m/s)	Dwight Webley (JAM)	13.61 (-1.5 m/s)	Marcos Amalbert (PUR)	13.39 (-0.5 m/s)
Shot put	Guilbert Villarreal (MEX)	15.68	Carlos Flores (MEX)	15.21	Raymond Brown (JAM)	14.95
Discus throw	José Carlos de la Torre (MEX)	48.35	Kerron Brown (TRI)	44.41	Fidelfo Lozano (MEX)	42.89
Hammer throw	Luis Torres (MEX)	57.57	Antonio Torres (PUR)	51.77	Wilfredo de Jesús (PUR)	49.51
Javelin throw	Juan Méndez (MEX)	60.48	Omar Jones (IVB)	51.66	Juan Mora (MEX)	51.03
Octathlon	Ramón Garibay (MEX)	4832 CR	Gabriel Arroyo (PUR)	4541	Gustavo Cantù (MEX)	3629
5000 metres track walk	Rufino Ramírez (MEX)	22:37.41	Joe Bonilla (PUR)	23:46.06	Víctor Mendoza (ESA)	23:56.44
4 × 100 metres relay	Jamaica; Ramaldo Turner; Teo Bennett; Akeem Smith; Cawayne Jervis	42.33	Puerto Rico	42.65	Bahamas; Ashman Sweeting; Jonathan Davis; Deangelo Sands; Larry Pinder	42.77
4 × 400 metres relay	Jamaica; Keneil Lee; Cawayne Jervis; Dwight Webley; Romel Lewis	3:21.15	Puerto Rico; Víctor G. Valentín; Gustavo de Jesús; Gabriel O. Acevedo; Christian Santiago	3:21.98	Bahamas; Keyon Minns; Deangelo Sands; Larry Pinder; Christopher Adderley	3:22.57

=== Female Junior B (under 17) ===
Event	Gold		Silver		Bronze	
100 metres (0.4 m/s)	Kimberly Smith (JAM)	11.64	T'Shonda Webb (BAH)	11.94	Semoy Hackett (TRI)	11.97
200 metres (2.7 m/s)	Sade St. Louis (TRI)	23.83 w	Britney St. Louis (TRI)	24.31 w	T'Shonda Webb (BAH)	24.43 w
400 metres	Britney St. Louis (TRI)	54.61	Sade St. Louis (TRI)	54.68	Shakeeri Cole (JAM)	56.09
800 metres	Vanessa Boyd (JAM)	2:16.13	Deanne Lightbourne (BER)	2:16.58	Kenia Suárez (MEX)	2:18.39
1200 metres	Karen Arce (CRC)	3:41.72	Sheila Alcántara (MEX)	3:42.90	Maritza Arenas (MEX)	3:46.21
100 metres hurdles (1.6 m/s)	Natasha Ruddock (JAM)	13.83	Karla Dueñas (MEX)	13.94	Carla Rodríguez (MEX)	14.24
300 metres hurdles	Michelle Cumberbatch (BAH)	43.88	Kierre Beckles (BAR)	44.67	Andrea Sutherland (JAM)	44.75
High jump	Latroya Darrell (BER)	1.76	Liliana Vázquez (MEX)	1.66	Andrea Moss (BAH)	1.60
Long jump	Shara Proctor (AIA)	5.99 (0.0 m/s)	Arantxa King (BER)	5.85 (0.0 m/s)	Bianca Stuart (BAH)	5.71 (0.0 m/s)
Triple jump	Kimona Smith (JAM)	11.87 (-1.5 m/s)	Latroya Darrell (BER)	11.76 (-2.2 m/s)	Maricela Bustamante (MEX)	11.37 (-1.7 m/s)
Shot put	Rosario Sánchez (MEX)	12.30	Gabrielle Nixon (BAH)	12.00	Claudia Aguilar (MEX)	11.73
Discus throw	Paulina Flores (MEX)	36.78	Georgina Luján (MEX)	33.83	Yahaira Ellington (GUA)	32.47
Javelin throw	Kyann Maynard (BAR)	37.30	Venice Fredericks (TRI)	37.15	Catalina Morales (MEX)	33.79
Pentathlon	Nahomi Rivera (PUR)	3018	Verónica Sánchez (MEX)	2960	Gladys Quijada (ESA)	2498
4000 metres Track Walk	María Pérez (MEX)	21:02.84	María Guajardo (MEX)	21:12.78	Roxanne Rivera (PUR)	22:03.45
4 × 100 metres relay	Trinidad and Tobago; Jurnelle Francis; Semoy Hackett; Britney St. Louis; Sade St. Louis	46.08	Jamaica; Naffene Briscoe; Kimberly Smith; Natasha Ruddock; Samantha Henry	47.28	Bahamas; Eugenia Patton; T'Shonda Webb; Bianca Stuart; Michelle Cumberbatch	47.97
4 × 400 metres relay	Jamaica; Judith Riley; Shakeeri Cole; Kimberly Smith; Andrea Sutherland	3:49.42	Bermuda	3:56.42	Mexico; Alejandra Cherizola; Karina Herrera; Beatriz Dolores Curiel; Evelyn Kristell Mercado	4:00.77

== Medal table ==
The placing table and medal count was published.

=== Total ===
* Host nation (Mexico)

Rank	Nation	Gold	Silver	Bronze	Total
1	Mexico (MEX)*	23	24	27	74
2	Jamaica (JAM)	17	11	10	38
3	Trinidad and Tobago (TTO)	14	9	3	26
4	Puerto Rico (PUR)	11	12	15	38
5	Barbados (BAR)	5	2	2	9
6	Bahamas (BAH)	2	6	7	15
7	Bermuda (BER)	2	6	2	10
8	Antigua and Barbuda (ATG)	2	1	0	3
9	Costa Rica (CRC)	1	2	5	8
10	Saint Vincent and the Grenadines (VIN)	1	1	1	3
11	Saint Lucia (LCA)	1	1	0	2
12	Commonwealth Games Federation (CGF)	1	0	0	1
12	Nicaragua (NIC)	1	0	0	1
14	Guatemala (GUA)	0	2	2	4
15	El Salvador (ESA)	0	1	6	7
16	Cayman Islands (CAY)	0	1	2	3
17	British Virgin Islands (IVB)	0	1	0	1
17	Saint Kitts and Nevis (SKN)	0	1	0	1
Totals (18 entries)		81	81	82	244

== Placing table ==
The placing table for team trophy distributed to the 1st place overall team (men and women categories) was published.

=== Overall ===
The host country is highlighted in lavender blue

Rank	Nation	Points
1st place, gold medalist(s)	Mexico	759
2	Jamaica	369
3	Puerto Rico	349
4	Trinidad and Tobago	234
5	Bahamas	157
6	Costa Rica	149
7	Bermuda	113.5
8	Barbados	82
9	Guatemala	82
10	El Salvador	72.5
11	Cayman Islands	38
12	Antigua and Barbuda	26
13	Saint Vincent and the Grenadines	24
14	Saint Kitts and Nevis	19
15	Nicaragua	17
16	Honduras	16
17	Saint Lucia	15
18	British Virgin Islands	14
19	Anguilla	8
20	Aruba	6
21	Belize	5

== Participation (unofficial) ==
Detailed result lists can be found on the World Junior Athletics History website. An unofficial count yields a number of about 411 athletes (223 junior (under-20) and 188 youth (under-17)) from about 21 countries:

- Anguilla (1)
- Antigua and Barbuda (3)
- Aruba (2)
- Bahamas (27)
- Barbados (10)
- Belize (2)
- Bermuda (18)
- British Virgin Islands (4)
- Cayman Islands (12)
- Costa Rica (27)
- El Salvador (13)
- Guatemala (18)
- Honduras (7)
- Jamaica (44)
- (Mexico) México (137)
- Nicaragua (3)
- Puerto Rico (48)
- Saint Kitts and Nevis (5)
- Saint Lucia (2)
- Saint Vincent and the Grenadines (3)
- Trinidad and Tobago (25)
