= Markino =

Markino may refer to:

- Markino Buckley, Jamaican athlete
- Yoshio Markino, Japanese artist
