= Jacques Riparelli =

Italian sprinter (born 1983)

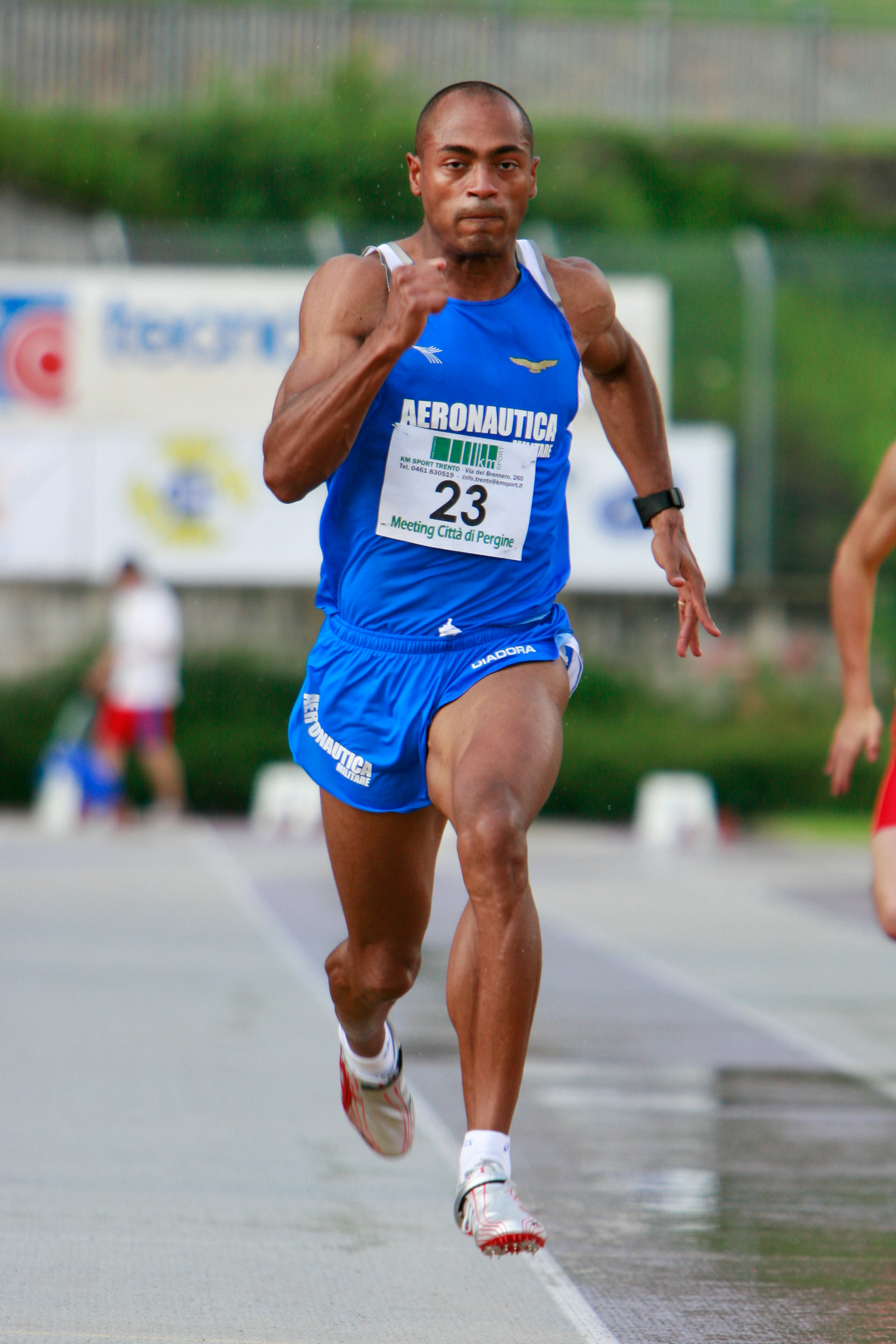

Personal information
- Nationality: Italian
- Born: 27 March 1983 (age 43) Yaoundé, Cameroon
- Height: 1.83 m (6 ft 0 in)
- Weight: 81 kg (179 lb)

Sport
- Country: Italy
- Sport: Athletics
- Event: Sprint
- Club: C.S. Aeronautica Militare

Achievements and titles
- Personal best: 100 m: 10.11 (2015)
Medal record
Mediterranean Games
Gold medal – first place	2013 Mersin	4 × 100 m relay

Jacques Riparelli (born 27 March 1983 in Yaoundé, Cameroon) is a track and field sprint athlete who competes internationally for Italy.

== Biography ==
His father is Italian, mother is Cameroonian. Jacques Riparelli moved with his family to Italy at the age of four.

Riparelli represented Italy at the 2008 Summer Olympics in Beijing. He competed at the 4 × 100 metres relay together with Fabio Cerutti, Simone Collio and Emanuele di Gregorio. In their qualification heat they were disqualified and eliminated. He competed in the same event at the 2012 Summer Olympics.

== Achievements ==
Year	Competition	Venue	Position	Event	Time	Notes
2008	Olympic Games	(China) Beijing	DNF	4 × 100 metres relay	-	
2012	Olympic Games	(United Kingdom) London	Heat	4 × 100 metres relay	35.58	
2013	Mediterranean Games	(Turkey) Mersin	1st	4 × 100 m relay	39.06	

== See also ==
- Italian all-time lists - 100 metres
- Italy national relay team
