= Richard Davenport (sprinter) =

English sprinter (born 1985)

Personal information
- Born: 12 September 1985 (age 40)
- Height: 1.80 m (5 ft 11 in)
- Weight: 77 kg (170 lb)

Sport
- Sport: Athletics
- Event(s): 400 m, 400 m hurdles
- Club: Gloucester AC; Newham & Essex Beagles
- Coached by: David Farrow (-2005); Nick Dakin (2007–2012)

Richard Davenport (born 12 September 1985) is an English former sprinter who specialised in the 400 metres. He won a silver medal in the 4 × 400 metres relay at the 2005 European Indoor Championships.

== Biography ==
His personal bests in the event are 46.75 seconds outdoors (Birmingham 2012) and 47.30 seconds indoors (Birmingham 2005).

Davenport finished runner-up to Nathan Woodward in the 400 metres hurdles event at the 2011 British Athletics Championships.

== International competitions ==
Year	Competition	Venue	Position	Event	Notes
Representing Great Britain
2001	European Youth Olympic Festival	Murcia, Spain	2nd	400 m	48.59
2001	European Youth Olympic Festival	Murcia, Spain	2nd	4 × 100 m relay	42.21
2003	European Junior Championships	Tampere, Finland	8th (h)	400 m	47.37
2003	European Junior Championships	Tampere, Finland	4th	4 × 400 m relay	3:09.36
2004	World Junior Championships	Grosseto, Italy	7th	400 m hurdles	51.59
2004	World Junior Championships	Grosseto, Italy	5th	4 × 400 m relay	3:07.02
2005	European Indoor Championships	Madrid, Spain	2nd	4 × 400 m relay	3:09.53
2005	European U23 Championships	Erfurt, Germany	22nd (h)	400 m	47.45
2005	European U23 Championships	Erfurt, Germany	2nd	4 × 400 m relay	3:04.83
2011	Universiade	Shenzhen, China	5th	400 m hurdles	49.98
2011	Universiade	Shenzhen, China	8th (h)	4 × 100 m relay	40.38

== Personal bests ==
Outdoor

- 400 metres – 46.75 (Birmingham 2012)
- 800 metres – 1:50.17 (Street 2005)
- 400 metres hurdles – 49.76 (Birmingham 2011)

Indoor

- 400 metres – 47.30 (Birmingham 2005)
- 800 metres – 1:51.45 (Cardiff 2005)
