= Fabio Cerutti =

Italian sprinter (born 1985)

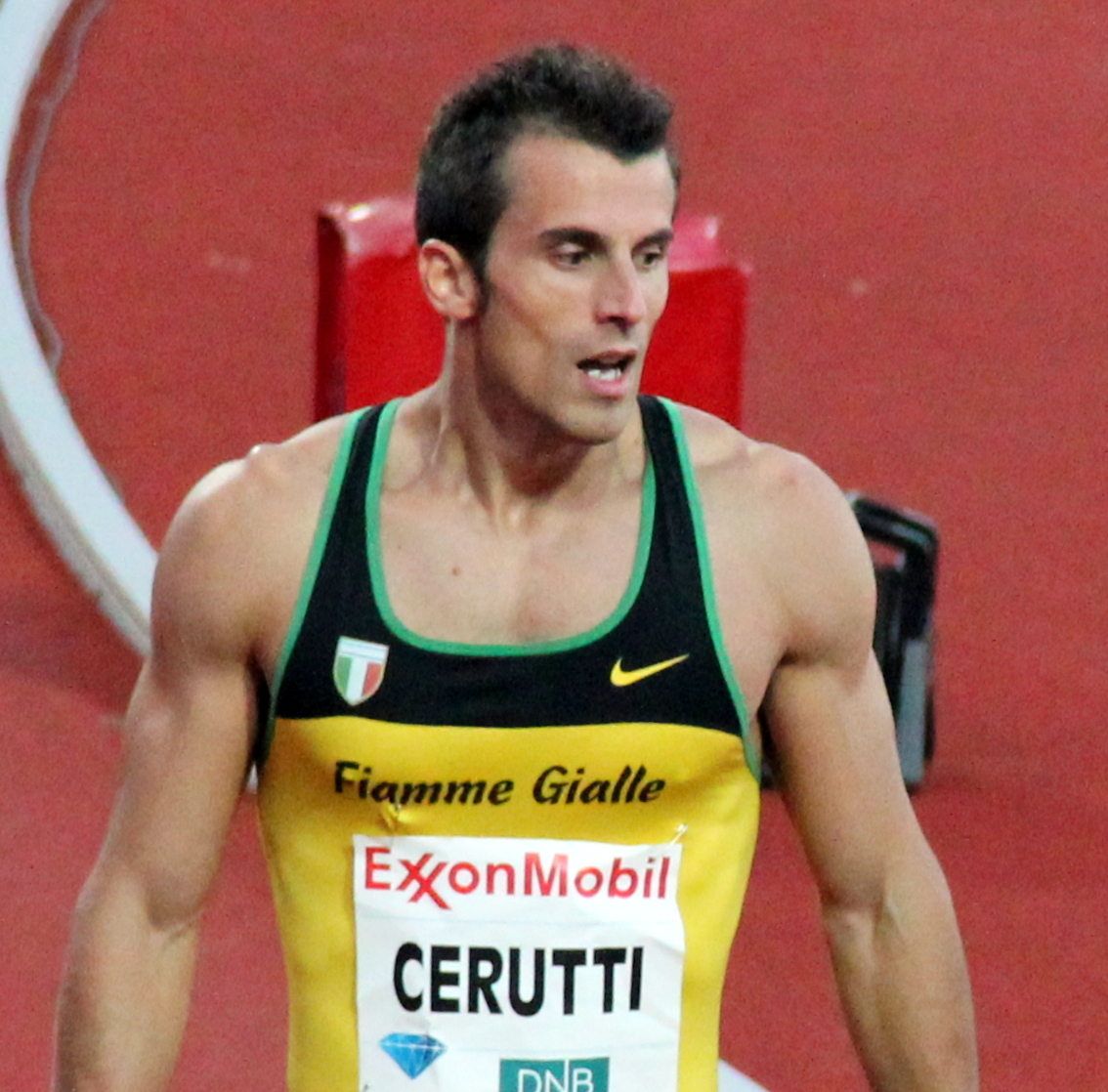
- Cerutti at the 2012 Bislett Games

Personal information
- Born: 26 September 1985 (age 40) Turin, Italy
- Height: 1.90 m (6 ft 3 in)
- Weight: 83 kg (183 lb)

Sport
- Country: Italy
- Sport: Athletics
- Events: 100 metres 200 metres
- Coached by: Ricardo Dieguez
Medal record
European Indoor Championships
Silver medal – second place	2009 Torino	60 m
Mediterranean Games
Bronze medal – third place	2009 Pescara	100 m

Fabio Cerutti (born 26 September 1985 in Turin) is an Italian sprinter who specializes in the 100 metres.

== Biography ==
He finished sixth in 60 metres at the 2007 European Indoor Championships. He also competed at the 2008 World Indoor Championships and the 2008 Olympic Games without reaching the final round. In Beijing, he finished 5th in his heat in 10.49 seconds. Together with Simone Collio, Emanuele di Gregorio and Jacques Riparelli, he also took part in the 4 x 100 metres relay, but they were disqualified in the first round. His personal best time is 10.13 seconds, achieved in July 2008 in Cagliari.

He equalled the Italian record of 6.55 seconds for 60m at the Italian indoor championships on 22 February 2009, winning his semi-final; however, he was disqualified in the final due to a false start, and it was eventually won by Simone Collio. At the European Indoor Championships in Turin, Cerutti finished second to Dwain Chambers in a time of 6.56. His teammate, Emanuele Di Gregorio, also ran a 6.5,6 earning him the bronze medal. He competed at the 2009 World Championships in Athletics, reaching the quarterfinals stage of the 100 m.

== National titles ==
He won 4 national championships at the individual senior level.

- Italian Athletics Championships
  - 100 metres: 2008, 2012, 2015
- Italian Indoor Athletics Championships
  - 60 metres: 2014

== See also ==
- Italian all-time lists - 100 metres
- Italy national relay team
