= Pantelis Melachroinoudis =

Greek sprinter

Personal information
- Nationality: Greece
- Born: 6 May 1985 (age 41) Athens, Greece
- Height: 1.84 m (6 ft 1/2 in)
- Weight: 73 kg (161 lb)

Sport
- Sport: Athletics
- Event: 4 × 400 metres relay
- Club: Panellinios GS (GRE)

Achievements and titles
- Personal best: 400 m: 46.13 s (2006)

Pantelis Melachroinoudis (Greek: Παντελής Μελαχροινούδης; born May 6, 1985, in Athens) is a Greek sprinter, who specialized in the 400 metres. Melachroinoudis competed for the men's 4 × 400 m relay at the 2008 Summer Olympics in Beijing, along with his teammates Stylianos Dimotsios, Konstadinos Anastasiou, and Dimitrios Gravalos. He ran on the third leg of the second heat, with an individual-split time of 45.15 seconds. Melachroinoudis and his team finished the relay in seventh place for a seasonal best time of 3:04.30, failing to advance into the final.

== Honours ==
Year	Competition	Venue	Position	Event	Notes
2008	Olympic Games	Beijing, China	15th (sf)	4 × 400 m relay	3:04.30 SB
2009	Mediterranean Games	Pescara, Italy	3rd	4 × 400 m relay	3:06.29
2010	European Championships	Barcelona, Spain	10th (sf)	4 × 400 m relay	3:07.12
