= Afzal Baig =

Pakistani athlete (born 1984)

Personal information
- Born: 10 April 1984 (age 42)

Sport
- Country: Pakistan
- Sport: Athletics
- Events: 100 metres, 200 metres

Afzal Baig (born 10 April 1984, Ghakhar Mandi) is a Pakistani athlete.

== Career ==
Afzal comes from Ghakhar Mandi in Punjab, Pakistan. He represents Pakistan WAPDA in national competitions. He has won various titles while representing Pakistan.

== See also ==
- Liaquat Ali, contemporary competitor in the same events
