= Gareth Warburton =

Welsh middle-distance runner (born 1983)

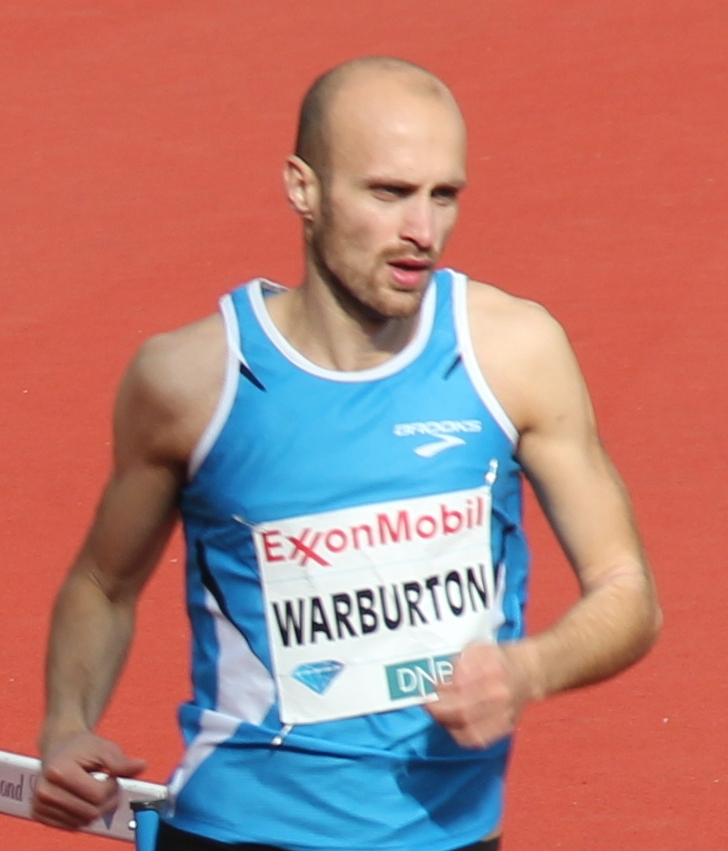
- Warburton at 2012 Bislett Games

Personal information
- Nationality: British (Welsh)
- Born: 23 April 1983 (age 42) Beverley, Yorkshire, England
- Height: 186 cm (6 ft 1 in)
- Weight: 72 kg (159 lb)

Sport
- Sport: Athletics
- Event: middle-distance
- Club: Cardiff AAC

Gareth Robert Warburton (born 23 April 1983) is an English born, former middle-distance runner who represented Wales and Great Britain. He specialised in the 800 metres and competed at the 2012 Summer Olympics.

== Biography ==
Warburton, born in Beverley, Yorkshire, England and originally from Caernarfon, finished fourth in the 800m at the 2010 Commonwealth Games. He has represented Great Britain on numerous occasions.

He was also a member of the Great Britain team at the London Olympics in 2012. He was selected as part of the Welsh squad for the 2014 Commonwealth Games, however he was suspended shortly before the start of the Games after he was charged with a violation of anti-doping rules. In January 2015 UK Anti-Doping accepted that his positive test was due to taking a contaminated supplement and that he had not knowingly cheated, and gave him a six-month suspension, which was covered by the time he had been suspended since the Commonwealth Games. He was the Welsh record holder for the 800m.

He was on the podium four times at the British Athletics Championships in 2010, 2011, 2013 and 2015.

== Achievements ==
Year	Competition	Venue	Position	Event	Notes
Representing United Kingdom
2005	European Indoor Championships	Madrid, Spain	2nd	4 × 400 m relay	3:09.53 s
2005	European U23 Championships	Erfurt, Germany	20th (h)	400m	47.34
2005	European U23 Championships	Erfurt, Germany	2nd	4 × 400 m relay	3:05.51
2011	European Team Championships	Stockholm, Sweden	3rd	800 m	1:46.95 s
Representing Wales
2006	Commonwealth Games	Melbourne, Australia	5th (h)	400 m	47.31 s
2010	Commonwealth Games	Delhi, India	4th	800 m	1:48.59 s
2010	Commonwealth Games	Delhi, India	6th	4 × 400 m relay	3:06.91 s
