= Andrew Steele =

British sprinter (born 1984)

Personal information
- Nationality: British (English)
- Born: 19 September 1984 (age 41) Didsbury, Manchester, England
- Height: 182 cm (6 ft 0 in)
- Weight: 78 kg (172 lb)

Sport
- Sport: Athletics
- Event: 400 m
- Club: Trafford AC
Medal record
Representing Great Britain
Olympic Games
Bronze medal – third place	2008 Beijing	4 × 400 m relay
European U23 Championships
Silver medal – second place	2005 Erfurt	4 × 400 m relay

Andrew Steele (born 19 September 1984) is a British 400 metres and 4 × 400 m relay runner. He competed at the 2008 Summer Olympics.

== Biography ==
Steele was educated at St Bede's College, Manchester. He is the son of Dr Chris Steele, the resident health expert on ITV's This Morning.

Steele became the British 400 metres champion after winning the 2007 British Athletics Championships.

In 2008, Steele competed in the Olympic Games held in Beijing. He ran a personal best time of 44.94 seconds in reaching the semi-final in the individual 400 m event. As part of the Great Britain team, he finished fourth in the final of the 4 × 400 m relay - 0.6 seconds away from a medal. However, in September 2016 it was confirmed that the Russian team, who had beaten Great Britain to bronze in this race, had been disqualified due to the retesting of Denis Alexeev's urine sample, which tested positive. Consequently, the British team was promoted to the bronze medal position.

Steele spent a few months each spring training at the Australian Institute of Sport, in Canberra.

He is head of product for DNAFit, a DNA testing startup.

== Personal bests ==
Event	Time (sec)	Venue	Date
200 metres	21.11	Birmingham, England	7 July 2007
400 metres	44.94	Beijing, China	18 August 2008
400 metres (indoor)	47.61	Budapest, Hungary	27 January 2006

- All information taken from IAAF profile.

== Competition record ==
Year	Competition	Venue	Position	Event	Notes
2005	European U23 Championships	Erfurt, Germany	2nd	4 × 400 m relay	3:04.83
2006	Commonwealth Games	Melbourne, Australia	4th	4 × 400 m relay	3:02.01
2007	World Championships	Osaka, Japan	30th (heats)	400 m	45.54
2007	World Championships	Osaka, Japan	6th	4 × 400 m relay	3:02.94
2008	Olympic Games	Beijing, China	22nd (semis)	400 m	45.59
2008	Olympic Games	Beijing, China	3rd	4 × 400 m relay	2:58.81
