= Dimitrios Gravalos =

Greek sprinter (born 1984)

Personal information
- Nationality: Greece
- Born: 18 April 1984 (age 42) Kalamaria, Greece
- Height: 1.92 m (6 ft 3 1/2 in)
- Weight: 85 kg (187 lb)

Sport
- Sport: Athletics
- Event: 4 × 400 metres relay
- Club: Panellinios GS (GRE)
- Coached by: Parharidou Pinelopi

Achievements and titles
- Personal best: 400 m: 45.94 s (2006)
Medal record
Men's athletics
Representing Greece
European Junior Championships
Gold medal – first place	2003 Tampere	400 m
Mediterranean Games
Bronze medal – third place	2009 Pescara	4x400 m relay
Bronze medal – third place	2013 Mersin	4x400 m relay

Dimitrios Gravalos (Greek: Δημήτρης Γράβαλος; born 18 April 1984 in Kalamaria) is a Greek sprinter, who specialized in the 400 metres. He won the gold medal for the 400 metres at the 2003 European Junior Championships in Tampere, Finland, with a time of 46.54 seconds.

Gravalos competed for the men's 4 × 400 m relay at the 2008 Summer Olympics in Beijing, along with his teammates Stylianos Dimotsios, Konstadinos Anastasiou, and Pantelis Melachroinoudis. He ran on the second leg of the second heat, with an individual-split time of 45.66 seconds. The team finished the relay in fifteenth place for a seasonal best time of 3:04.30, failing to advance into the final.

== Honours ==
Year	Competition	Venue	Position	Event	Notes
Representing Greece
2002	World Junior Championships	Kingston, Jamaica	20th (sf)	400m	47.83
2003	European Junior Championships	Tampere, Finland	1st	400 m	46.54
2005	European U23 Championships	Erfurt, Germany	4th	400 m	47.64
2008	Olympic Games	Beijing, China	15th (sf)	4 × 400 m relay	3:04.30 SB
2009	Mediterranean Games	Pescara, Italy	3rd	4 × 400 m relay	3:06.29
2009	Mediterranean Games	Pescara, Italy	6th	400 m	46.29 SB
2010	European Championships	Barcelona, Spain	10th (sf)	4 × 400 m relay	3:07.12
2010	European Championships	Barcelona, Spain	17th (sf)	400 m	46.30 SB
2013	Mediterranean Games	Mersin, Turkey	3rd	4 × 400 m relay	3:07.36
2013	Mediterranean Games	Mersin, Turkey	7th	400 m	46.76 SB
