= Marianna Zachariadi =

Greek pole vaulter (1990–2013)

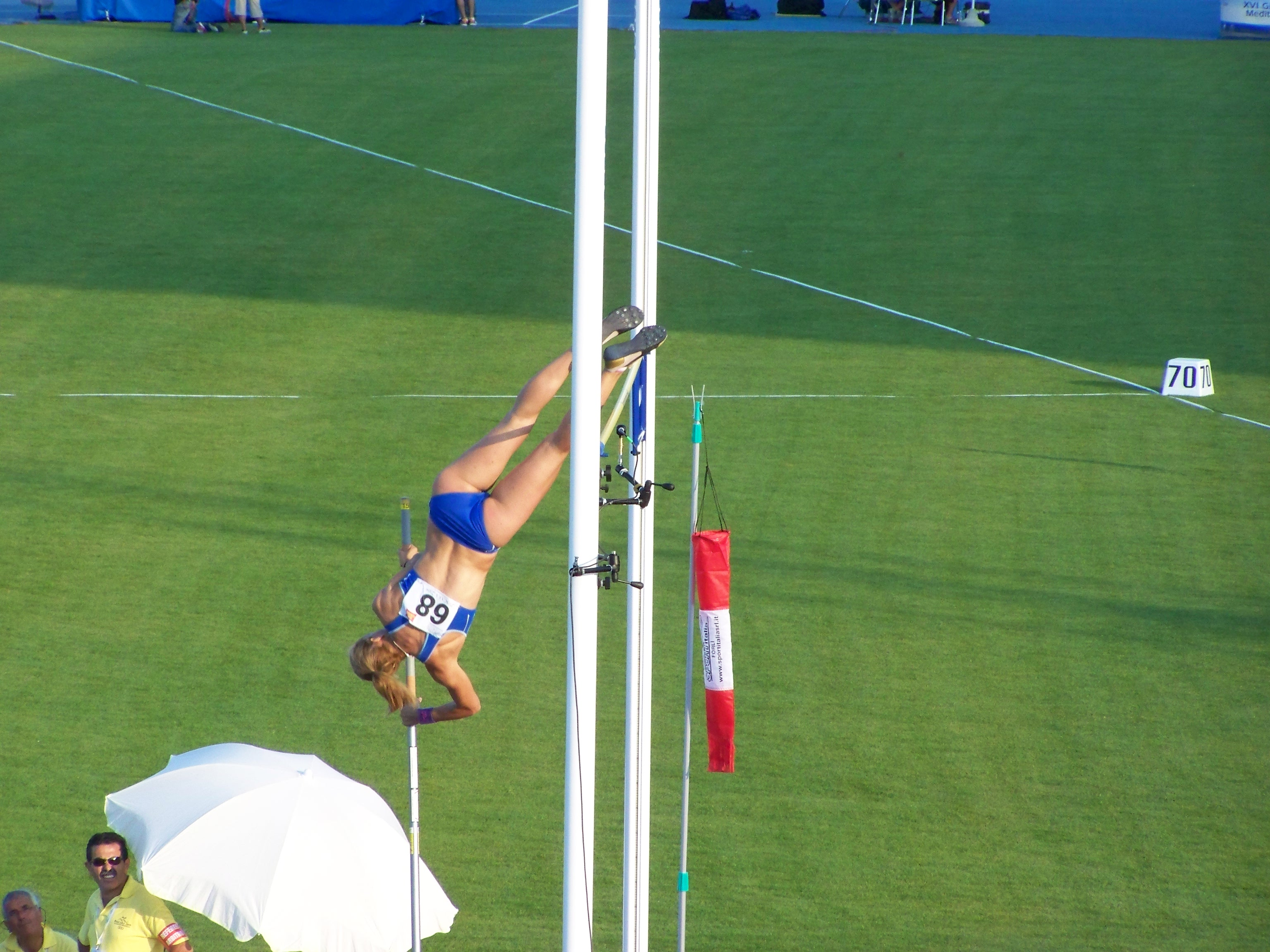
- Zachariadi at the 2009 Mediterranean Games

Medal record

Mediterranean Games
Silver medal – second place	2009 Pescara	Pole vault

Commonwealth Games
Silver medal – second place	2010 New Delhi	Pole vault

Marianna Zachariadi (Greek: Μαριάννα Ζαχαριάδη; 25 February 1990 – 29 April 2013) was a Greek pole vaulter who later competed for Cyprus.

She won silver in pole vault at the 2009 Mediterranean Games as well as at the 2010 Commonwealth Games. Zachariadi died in 2013, aged 23, of Hodgkin's lymphoma, which had been diagnosed in 2011.
