= Markino Buckley =

Jamaican track and field athlete

Medal record

Athletics

Representing Jamaica

CAC Junior Championships (U20)
Silver medal – second place	2004 Coatzacoalcos	400 m hurdles
Bronze medal – third place	2004 Coatzacoalcos	4x400 m relay

CARIFTA Games Junior (U20)
Gold medal – first place	2005 Bacolet	110 m hurdles
Gold medal – first place	2004 Hamilton	400 m hurdles
Gold medal – first place	2004 Hamilton	4x400 m relay

CARIFTA Games Youth (U17)
Silver medal – second place	2002 Nassau	400 m hurdles
Bronze medal – third place	2002 Nassau	High jump

Markino Buckley (born 16 April 1986) is a Jamaican track and field athlete who specialises in the 400 metres hurdles. He is part of the MVP Track & Field Club, which also has sprinters Asafa Powell and Nesta Carter as members.

== Career ==
Buckey attended St. Jago High School. As a professional, he began with the MVP Track Club, then transitioned to the Racers Track Club, then returned to the MVP Track Club in 2012.

He started his career in international athletics with an appearance at the 2004 World Junior Championships in Athletics. He set a personal best of 52.03 seconds in the 400 m hurdles heats, but was eliminated in the semi-finals. He took third place at the 2007 Jamaican National Championships, running a season's best of 49.24 s behind Danny McFarlane and Isa Phillips. This earned him the third spot on the Jamaican team at the 2007 World Championships in Athletics, but he did not managed to finish in his first race in Osaka, bringing an abrupt end to his senior global debut.

He made his Olympic debut the following year at the 2008 Summer Olympics and he set a personal best of 48.50 seconds to qualify in the semi-finals. He was a little slower in the final race, however, and finished in seventh place. He ran at the 2008 IAAF World Athletics Final afterwards and took fourth place. He lost out on a place at the 2009 World Championships in Athletics to Josef Robertson, and Buckley missed the competition as an unused reserve athlete.

== Achievements ==
Year	Competition	Venue	Position	Event	Notes
Representing Jamaica
2001	CARIFTA Games (U-17)	Bridgetown, Barbados	9th	High jump	1.75m
2002	CARIFTA Games (U-17)	Nassau, Bahamas	2nd	400 m hurdles	55.33
2002	CARIFTA Games (U-17)	Nassau, Bahamas	3rd	High jump	1.95m
2004	CARIFTA Games (U-20)	Hamilton, Bermuda	6th	110 m hurdles	19.37 (0.1 m/s)
2004	CARIFTA Games (U-20)	Hamilton, Bermuda	1st	400 m hurdles	52.46
2004	CARIFTA Games (U-20)	Hamilton, Bermuda	1st	4 × 400 m relay	3:12.00
2004	Central American and Caribbean Junior Championships (U-20)	Coatzacoalcos, Mexico	2nd	400 m hurdles	53.30
2004	Central American and Caribbean Junior Championships (U-20)	Coatzacoalcos, Mexico	3rd	4 × 400 m relay	3:12.92
2004	World Junior Championships	Grosseto, Italy	15th (sf)	400m hurdles	52.89
2005	CARIFTA Games (U-20)	Bacolet, Trinidad and Tobago	1st	110 m hurdles	14.34 (-0.7 m/s)
