= Konstadinos Anastasiou =

Greek sprinter

Personal information
- Nationality: Greece
- Born: 1 September 1986 (age 39) Marousi, Athens, Greece
- Height: 1.84 m (6 ft 1/2 in)
- Weight: 85 kg (187 lb)

Sport
- Sport: Athletics
- Event: 4 × 400 metres relay
- Club: Panionos (GRE)

Achievements and titles
- Personal best: 400 m: 47.43 s (2006)

Konstadinos Anastasiou (Greek: Κωνσταντίνος Αναστασίου; born September 1, 1986, in Marousi, Athens) is a Greek sprinter, who specialized in the 400 metres. Anastasiou competed for the men's 4 × 400 m relay at the 2008 Summer Olympics in Beijing, along with his teammates Stylianos Dimotsios, Dimitrios Gravalos, and Pantelis Melachroinoudis. He ran on the anchor leg of the second heat, with an individual-split time of 46.63 seconds. Anastasiou and his team finished the relay in seventh place for a seasonal best time of 3:04.30, failing to advance into the final.
