= Nicolas Fillon =

French sprinter (born 1986)

Nicolas Fillon (born January 14, 1986, in Suresnes) is a French athlete who specialises in the 400 meters. Fillon competed at the 2010 IAAF World Indoor Championships.
