= Rita Nieves =

American public health administrator

- Education: University of Puerto Rico; Simmon College (MSW)
- Medical career
- Profession: Nurse

Rita Nieves RN, MPH, LICSW, was appointed the interim executive director of the Boston Public Health Commission (BPHC) in December 2019. She's also been a nurse, social work clinician, public health administrator, and community advocate.

== Career ==
Nieves started at the BPHC in 1994 and her last post was Director of Organizational Development at the Office of Recovery Services (ORS). She came to that position after working for three years as deputy director of the commission for three years. Nieves oversaw thirteen TB clinics in Puerto Rico and was Director of TB Control for Boston. Between 1983 and 1989, Nieves worker as an OR nurse at Boston City Hospital and University Hospital. She has been a consultant to SAMHSA, the National Academies of Sciences, Engineering, and Medicine and the National Latino Behavioral Health Association.

== Education ==
She received her RN and MPH from the University of Puerto Rico, Medical Sciences Campus and her MSW from Simmons College.
