= Ibrahim Al-Hamaidi =

Saudi Arabian hurdler (born 1985)

Personal information
- Nationality: Saudi Arabian
- Born: 28 August 1985 (age 40)

Sport
- Sport: Track and field
- Event: 400 metres hurdles

Ibrahim Al-Hamaidi (born 28 August 1985) is a Saudi Arabian hurdler. He competed in the men's 400 metres hurdles at the 2004 Summer Olympics.
