= Athletics at the 2001 European Youth Summer Olympic Festival =

The athletics competition at the 2001 European Youth Summer Olympic Festival was held from 22 to 26 July. The events took place at the Estadio de Atletismo Monte Romero in Murcia, Spain. Boys and girls born 1984 or 1985 or later participated 31 track and field events, with similar programmes for the sexes with the exception of no steeplechase event for girls.

== Medal summary ==
=== Men ===
Event	Gold		Silver		Bronze	
100 metres	Ivor-Tit Jurisic (CRO)	10.70	Simon Maestra (ESP)	10.76	Clive Turner (GBR)	10.79
200 metres	Ivor-Tit Jurišić (CRO)	21.61	Matthew Ouche (GBR)	21.76	David Alerte (FRA)	21.79
400 metres	Piotr Zrada (POL)	47.03	Richard Davenport (GBR)	48.59	Darjan Murko (SLO)	49.03
800 metres	David Fiegen (LUX)	1:54.18	Andreas Felix (SUI)	1:55.22	Jozef Pelikán (SVK)	1:55.33
1500 metres	Olle Walleräng (SWE)	3:57.59	Joris De Vulder (BEL)	3:57.85	Mark Draper (GBR)	3:59.66
3000 metres	Mark Shankey (GBR)	8:35.65	Yevgeny Rybakov (RUS)	8:36.10	Jérémy Pierrat (FRA)	8:39.01
110 metres hurdles	Markus Tuomela (FIN)	13.46 w	Andreas Kundert (SUI)	13.56 w	Gotthard Schöpf (AUT)	13.60 w
400 metres hurdles	Rhys Williams (GBR)	53.42	Eelco Veldhuyzen (NED)	54.14	Razvan Cantaragiu (ROU)	54.48
2000 metres steeplechase	Miloš Vučković (YUG)	5:48.43	Vitaliy Piskun (BLR)	5:48.57	Michael Fadeau (FRA)	5:58.58
4×100 m relay	France (FRA); Yann Tavernier; Jean-Paul Fernandez; Éric Bologne; David Alerte	41.92	Great Britain (GBR); Clive Turner; Richard Davenport; Kenneth Frempong; Matthew Ouche	42.21	Croatia (CRO); Tomislav Vukušić; Goran Bogdanović; Boris Vranić; Ivor-Tit Jurišić	42.48
High jump	Aleksey Dmitrik (RUS)	2.14 m	Michał Bieniek (POL)	2.09 m	Stijn Stroobants (BEL)	2.09 m
Pole vault	Vladislav Revenko (UKR)	5.10 m	Artyom Kuptsov (RUS)	5.10 m	Johan Carlsson (SWE)	4.80 m
Long jump	Nelson Évora (POR)	7.49 m	Markus Tuomela (FIN)	7.34 m	Aleh Bondar (BLR)	7.11 m
Shot put	Georgi Ivanov (BUL)	19.63 m	Soslan Tsirikhov (RUS)	18.85 m	Zurab Gigaia (GEO)	18.73 m
Discus throw	Andrey Semenov (UKR)	60.72 m	Erik Cadée (NED)	58.42 m	Luka Rujevic (YUG)	55.86 m
Javelin throw	Alex van der Merwe (GBR)	68.78 m	Zoltán Magyari (HUN)	67.06 m	Antti Hattula (FIN)	65.62 m

=== Women ===
Event	Gold		Silver		Bronze	
100 metres	Jade Lucas-Read (GBR)	11.82	Yekaterina Kuznetsova (RUS)	11.89	Jenny Ljunggren (SWE)	11.96
200 metres	Jenny Ljunggren (SWE)	24.26	Margarita Anisimova (RUS)	24.46	Olga Vorobey (BLR)	24.75
400 metres	Mariya Dryakhlova (RUS)	54.88	Edina Rahimovski (CRO)	55.99	Tamara Kopecká (SVK)	56.53
800 metres	Kitty Cziráki (HUN)	2:09.39	Veronika Plesarová (CZE)	2:09.40	Yelena Bondar (UKR)	2:10.35
1500 metres	Katrina Wootton (GBR)	4:32.62	Leen Vandeweege (BEL)	4:34.78	Nancy Frouin (FRA)	4:35.29
3000 metres	Snežana Kostić (YUG)	9:48.26	Alicia González (ESP)	9:48.69	Laura Silva (POR)	9:54.16
100 metres hurdles	Sabrina Altermatt (SUI)	13.40 w	Élodie Musler (FRA)	13.76 w	Madleena Larivaara (FIN)	13.86 w
400 metres hurdles	Olga Nikolayeva (RUS)	59.33	Sian Scott (GBR)	60.50	Kirsten Hendriks (BEL)	60.54
4×100 m relay	Russia (RUS); Natalya Yakovleva; Mariya Dryakhlova; Yekaterina Kuznetsova; Margarita Anisimova	46.45	Great Britain (GBR); Katie Flaherty; Jade Lucas-Read; Phyllis Agbo; Gemma Fergusson	46.48	France (FRA); Géraldine Lécefel; Élodie Musler; Elysée Vesanes; Alice Decaux	47.99
High jump	Emma Green (SWE)	1.82 m	Karina Vnukova (LTU)	1.75 m	Marina Caneva (ITA) Irina Glavatskikh (RUS)	1.70 m
Pole vault	Aleksandra Kiryashova (RUS)	4.00 m	Anne Leroy (BEL)	3.70 m	Kate Dennison (GBR)	3.60 m
Long jump	Margrethe Renstrøm (NOR)	6.15 m	Elysée Vesanes (FRA)	6.14 m	Adina Anton (ROU)	6.05 m
Shot put	Yuliya Leantsiuk (BLR)	14.47 m	Mama Fatty (ESP)	13.81 m	Hennariikka Järvinen (FIN)	13.37 m
Discus throw	Darya Pishchalnikova (RUS)	53.93 m	Kateryna Karsak (UKR)	45.90 m	Inge Van Geel (BEL)	44.56 m
Javelin throw	Ilze Gribule (LAT)	49.27 m	Sofie Schoenmaekers (BEL)	45.89 m	Ružica Kozjak (CRO)	45.49 m
