= Myhaylo Knysh =

Ukrainian sprinter

Personal information
- Full name: Myhaylo Mykolayovych Knysh
- Nationality: Ukraine
- Born: 22 November 1983 (age 42) Zhytomyr, Ukrainian SSR, Soviet Union
- Height: 1.79 m (5 ft 10 1/2 in)
- Weight: 79 kg (174 lb)

Sport
- Sport: Athletics
- Event: Sprint
- Club: Kolos Vinnytsia Oblast

Achievements and titles
- Personal bests: 100 m: 10.67 s (2005); 200 m: 20.95 s (2008); 400 m: 45.87 s (2008)
Medal record
European Team Championships
Bronze medal – third place	2010 Bergen	4x400 metres relay

Myhaylo Mykolayovych Knysh (Ukrainian: Михайло Миколайович Книш; born November 22, 1983, in Zhytomyr) is a Ukrainian sprinter, who specialized in the 400 metres. Knysh made his official debut for the 2004 Summer Olympics in Athens, where he placed sixth for the national sprint team in the preliminary heats of men's 4 × 400 m relay, with a time of 3:04.01.

At the 2008 Summer Olympics in Beijing, Knysh competed for the men's 400 metres this time, as an individual athlete. He ran in the seventh heat against seven other athletes, including defending Olympic champion Jeremy Wariner of the United States. He finished the race in sixth place by one quarter of a second (0.25) behind Russia's Maksim Dyldin, with a time of 46.28 seconds. Knysh, however, failed to advance into the semi-finals, as he placed thirty-sixth overall and was ranked below three mandatory slots for the next round. He also tied his overall position in the heats with Dominican Republic's Arismendy Peguero.
