= Robert Lathouwers =

Dutch athlete (born 1983)

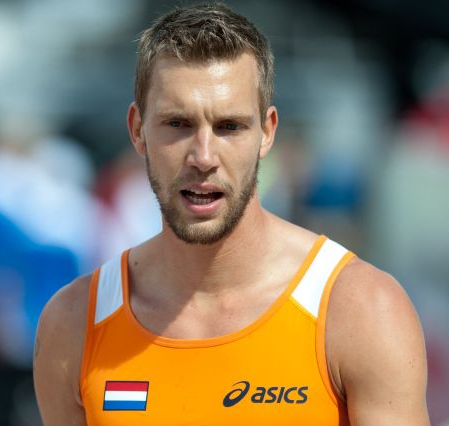
- Robert Lathouwers in 2012.

Personal information
- Full name: Robert Lathouwers
- Nickname: -
- Born: 8 July 1983 (age 43) Rotterdam, Netherlands
- Height: 1.89 m (6 ft 2 in)
- Weight: 74 kg (163 lb)
- Updated on August 5, 2008

Robert Lathouwers (born 8 July 1983 in Rotterdam) is a former Dutch athlete who mainly focused on the 400 and 800 metres.

== Biography ==
Lathouwers was born and raised in Rotterdam and has a sister who is two years older than he is named Maura. He started in athletics at the age of six, doing all different kinds of disciplines in the sport. He was a multi talented athlete and he won several heptathlon and decathlon meetings and was also invited to represent the Netherlands in international nation meetings. At the age of 17 he decided to fully concentrate himself at the sport and started training much more intensively. As the 400 metres was his best discipline in the decathlon he decided to focus on that and soon afterward he canceled his decathlon aspirations.

After a period of quiet and effective training sessions he broke his personal record to 48.55 seconds, which was the 3rd time ever run by a B-junior in the Netherlands. In his first year as an A-junior he ran 47.14 seconds and he qualified himself for the 2001 European Junior Championships in Italy. The following year he suffered from several injuries, but still managed to break his personal record again to a time of 47.11 seconds. Due to this effort he qualified for the World Junior Championships in Jamaica where he finished in the 9th position. He represented the Netherlands also at the European Cup meeting in Sevilla where he participated in the 4 x 400 metres relay in which his team became third in a time of 3:06.23.

On 15 February 2003 he won his first national senior title at the Dutch Indoor Championships. Later that year during the Golden Spike meeting in Leiden he ran 46.78 and qualified himself for the European under-23 Championships in Bydgoszcz. Together with his teammates Jordy Hindriks, Peter Wolters and Jelle Heisen he also qualified for the 4 x 400 metres relay, running 3:08.95. At the European Championships Hindriks was replaced by Youssef el Rhalfioui and together they ran to a fourth position in a new Dutch under-23 record of 3:06.61. In 2005 he won his second indoor 400 metres title and later during the year he won his first outdoor title. Alongside Daniël Ward, Daniël de Wild and Sjors Kampen he also won a bronze medal at the European Under-23 Championships in Erfurt.

Lathouwers had a disappointing year in 2006 as he suffered from injuries and was almost drowned during swimming at sea. In December 2006 he was asked by Haag Atletiek to substitute one of their runners at the 800 metres. Lathouwers was sceptical about the distance however, as he never ran races longer than 400 metres. He eventually gave it a try and he was the first to cross the finish line in 1:51.57. Lathouwers made a huge change in his career and decided to focus on the 800 metres from then on and during a training session in South Africa he ran the 800 metres in 1:47.81. In January 2008 he ran another race in South Africa in 1:46.70 and February during his first ever indoor 800 metres he ran 1:48.31, which was enough to qualify for the World Indoor Championships in Sevilla. A week later he became Dutch National Indoor Champion over 800 metres and during the outdoor season he also took this Dutch national title. At the World Championships he won his serie in the first round, which qualified him straight for the semi-finals. In these semi finals he finished third behind Mbulaeni Mulaudzi and Abubaker Kaki Khamis and was eliminated. However, his time of 1:48.27 was another personal best. During the FBK Games in Hengelo he won the 800 metres impressively in 1:45.80, beating many World class runners, inclusive World Champion Alfred Yego. His next goal was to qualify for the 2008 Summer Olympics and on 13 July in Athens his 1:45.30 was only 0.05 short to break the Olympic limit. Then, on 29 July in Monaco, he secured his Olympic debut by running an impressive 1:44.75 during the Super Grand-Prix meeting there. He was disqualified from the 800m heats in the 2010 European Championships in Barcelona.

== Personal bests ==
Outdoor

- 200 metres - 21.48 (2001, Uden)
- 300 metres - 34.05 (2001, Lisse)
- 400 metres - 46.52 (2005, Leiden)
- 600 metres - 1:15.90 (2012, Pliezhausen)
- 800 metres - 1:44.61 (2012, Hengelo)

Indoor

- 400 metres - 47.56 (2003, Ghent)
- 800 metres - 1:48.27 (2008, Valencia)

== Honours ==
- (gold) 400 metres (indoor) - Dutch National Championships, 2003, 2005
- (gold) 400 metres - Dutch National Championships, 2005
- (gold) 800 metres (indoor) - Dutch National Championships, 2008
- (gold) 800 metres - Dutch National Championships, 2008
- (bronze) 4 x 400 metres - European under-23 Championships, 2005

Awards
Preceded by Francisco Elson	Rotterdam Sportsman of the Year; 2008	Succeeded by David Kuiper
