= 2001 CARIFTA Games =

XXX CARIFTA Games
- Dates: April 14–16
- Host city: Bridgetown, Barbados
- Level: Junior and Youth
- Events: 62 (35 junior (incl. 4 open), 27 youth)
- Participation: about 382 (220 junior, 162 youth) athletes from about 23 nations
- Records set: 7 games records

The 30th CARIFTA Games was held in Bridgetown, Barbados, on April 14–16, 2001. An appraisal of the results has been given on the occasion of 40th anniversary of the games, and on the IAAF website.

== Participation (unofficial) ==
Detailed result lists can be found both on the CFPI and on the "World Junior Athletics History" website. An unofficial count yields the number of about 382 athletes (220 junior (under-20) and 162 youth (under-17)) from about 23 countries: Antigua and Barbuda (7), Aruba (4), Bahamas (39), Barbados (54), Bermuda (11), British Virgin Islands (4), Cayman Islands (14), Dominica (7), French Guiana (1), Grenada (32), Guadeloupe (20), Guyana (6), Haiti (1), Jamaica (61), Martinique (36), Netherlands Antilles (5), Saint Kitts and Nevis (3), Saint Lucia (10), Saint Vincent and the Grenadines (4), Suriname (3), Trinidad and Tobago (47), Turks and Caicos Islands (7), US Virgin Islands (6).

== Records ==
It is reported that a total of 9 games records were set. However, the reporting for the two relay records might be disputable.

In his first year as a junior. Darrel Brown from Trinidad and Tobago finished the 100 metres in 10.24s (wind: 0.0 m/s). Further records in the boys' U-20 category were established by Damion Barry, also from Trinidad and Tobago, in 46.51s over 400 metres, and Damon Thompson from Barbados jumping 2.20m high. It is stated that the Trinidad and Tobago 4 × 100 metres relay team winning in 40.19s also set a new games record, but this is not marked as a record in the published results. Moreover, two other sources list faster times of 39.87s for Jamaica at the 1997 CARIFTA Games, and 40.03s at the 1998 CARIFTA Games.

In the girls' U-20 category, Veronica Campbell from Jamaica improved her own mark for 200 metres from the year before to 22.93 seconds (wind: -1.6 m/s). Melaine Walker from Jamaica achieved 56.90s in 400 metres hurdles.

In the boys' U-17 category, two new records were set: by Kern Harripersad from Trinidad and Tobago in 1:55.20 for 800 metres, and by Jamaican Patrick Lee finishing the 100 metres hurdles in 13.20s (wind: -2.3 m/s).

Finally, in the girls' U-20 category, it is also stated that the Jamaican 4 × 100 metres relay team winning in 45.44s set a new games record. Again, this is not marked as a record in the published results, and two other sources list a faster time of 45.16s for Jamaica at the 1999 CARIFTA Games,

== Austin Sealy Award ==
The Austin Sealy Trophy for the most outstanding athlete of the games was awarded to Veronica Campbell from Jamaica. She won 3 gold medals (100m, 200m, and 4 × 100m relay) in the junior (U-20) category.

== Medal summary ==
Medal winners are published by category: Boys under 20 (Junior), Girls under 20 (Junior), Boys under 17 (Youth), and Girls under 17 (Youth). Complete results can be found on the CFPI and the "World Junior Athletics History" website.

=== Boys under 20 (Junior) ===
Event	Gold		Silver		Bronze	
100 metres (0.0 m/s)	Darrel Brown (TRI)	10.24 CR	Marc Burns (TRI)	10.48	Marvin Anderson (JAM)	10.49
200 metres (-0.3 m/s)	Ronald Pognon (MTQ)	21.18	Winston Smith (JAM)	21.40	Yohann Nègre (GLP)	21.52
400 metres	Damion Barry (TRI)	46.51 CR	Wilan Louis (BAR)	47.07	Dwayne Greenidge (BAR)	47.47
800 metres	Jameel Wilson (TRI)	1:53.06	Tai Payne (GUY)	1:53.35	Mathias Castingo (GLP)	1:53.41
1500 metres	Mathias Castingo (GLP)	3:56.16	Richard Walcott (BER)	3:56.68	Jerome Howell (JAM)	3:59.23
5000 metres	Kevin Campbell (JAM)	15:51.92	Kendell Simon (GRN)	15:52.72	Oneil Williams (BAH)	16:26.43
110 metres hurdles (-2.2 m/s)	Dwayne Robinson (JAM)	14.46	Eddy De Lépine (MTQ)	14.60	Ricardo Melbourne (JAM)	14.88
400 metres hurdles	Greg Little (JAM)	52.31	Ricardo Melbourne (JAM)	52.43	Shane Charles (GRN)	53.89
High jump	Damon Thompson (BAR)	2.20 CR	Trevor Barry (BAH)	2.08	Christopher Morrison (JAM)	2.00
Pole vault	Anthony Pratt (BAH)	4.00	Ronald Arnaud (MTQ)	3.90	Darvin Dean (BAH)	3.80
Long jump	Cleavon Dillon (TRI)	7.36 (-0.5 m/s)	Riquel Bruno (GUF)	7.18 (-0.6 m/s)	Cédric Judith (GLP)	7.15 (-0.3 m/s)
Triple jump	Keeter Sylvain (GLP)	15.45 (-0.7 m/s)	Nicholas Neufville (JAM)	14.96 (-1.4 m/s)	Daniel Mayaud (MTQ)	14.73 (-2.0 m/s)
Shot put	Shamir Thomas (GRN)	14.69	Jason Morgan (JAM)	14.63	Lionel Caster (MTQ)	13.78
Discus throw	Shamir Thomas (GRN)	47.56	Michael Gibson (BAR)	44.00	Keefdon Thomas (TRI)	43.06
Javelin throw	Keron Francis (GRN)	62.17	Jamal Forde (BAR)	60.96	Kayode Pantophlet (BAR)	60.00
Heptathlon	Keron Francis (GRN)	5063	Alleyne Lett (GRN)	4838	Dacosmo Wright (JAM)	4810
4 × 100 metres relay	Trinidad and Tobago	40.19	Jamaica; Davaon Spence; Marvin Anderson; Winston Smith; Steve Mullings	40.34	Guadeloupe; Keeter Sylvain; Yoan Negre; Cedric Judith; Xavier Guillaume	41.04
4 × 400 metres relay	Jamaica	3:08.69	Trinidad and Tobago	3:09.50	Barbados	3:11.11

: Open event for both junior and youth athletes.

=== Girls under 20 (Junior) ===
Event	Gold		Silver		Bronze	
100 metres (0.0 m/s)	Veronica Campbell (JAM)	11.32	Danielle Norville (BAR)	11.78	Utica Edgecombe (BAH)	11.80
200 metres (-1.6 m/s)	Veronica Campbell (JAM)	22.93 CR	Danielle Norville (BAR)	23.75	Tiandra Ponteen (SKN)	23.75
400 metres	Sheryl Morgan (JAM)	53.16	Tiandra Ponteen (SKN)	54.11	Kerrian White (JAM)	55.20
800 metres	Carlene Robinson (JAM)	2:12.61	Aneita Denton (JAM)	2:13.13	Isabelle Vingalalon (GLP)	2:15.05
1500 metres	Tanice Barnett (JAM)	4:42.13	Aneita Denton (JAM)	4:43.69	Isabelle Vingalalon (GLP)	4:45.98
3000 metres	Janill Williams (ATG)	10:02.97	Tanice Barnett (JAM)	10:15.06	Nessa Paul (LCA)	10:27.54
100 metres hurdles (-0.9 m/s)	Adrianna Lamalle (MTQ)	13.64	Melaine Walker (JAM)	13.87	Florence Vermal (MTQ)	14.38
400 metres hurdles	Melaine Walker (JAM)	56.90 CR	Patricia Hall (JAM)	58.57	Alicia Cave (TRI)	59.95
High jump	Levern Spencer (LCA)	1.79	Danille Prime (TRI)	1.75	Desiree Crichlow (BAR)	1.75
Long jump	Elysée Vesanes (MTQ)	5.90 (-0.1 m/s)	Ganaëlle Gombault (GLP)	5.76 (-0.2 m/s)	Rose Ann Hamilton (JAM)	5.73 (-1.1 m/s)
Triple jump	Desiree Crichlow (BAR)	12.73	Kemisha Nelson (JAM)	12.23w	Stéphanie Luzieux (MTQ)	12.16w
Shot put	Claudia Villeneuve (MTQ)	15.09	Laura Amory (MTQ)	13.79	Shernelle Nicholls (BAR)	12.99
Discus throw	Claudia Villeneuve (MTQ)	43.50	Shernelle Nicholls (BAR)	41.73	Kesheila Reid (JAM)	36.78
Javelin throw	Judy Modeste (GRN)	38.60	Natalie Dixon (TRI)	38.57	Erma Gene Evans (LCA)	38.30
Pentathlon	Lauren Maul (BAR)	3660	Althea Akeins (JAM)	3256	Astra Curry (BAH)	3144
4 × 100 metres relay	Jamaica; Shaunette Davidson; Melaine Walker; Kerron Stewart; Veronica Campbell	44.96	Barbados	45.37	Martinique	45.92
4 × 400 metres relay	Jamaica	3:34.63	Trinidad and Tobago	3:42.25	Barbados	3:44.45

: Open event for both junior and youth athletes.

=== Boys under 17 (Youth) ===
Event	Gold		Silver		Bronze	
100 metres (0.0 m/s)	Grafton Ifill (BAH)	10.67	Oscar Greene (BAH)	10.72	Nathanaël Mérine (MTQ)	10.90
200 metres (-1.7 m/s)	Grafton Ifill (BAH)	21.44	Usain Bolt (JAM)	21.81	Oscar Greene (BAH)	21.94
400 metres	Patrick Lee (JAM)	48.26	Usain Bolt (JAM)	48.28	Drameko Bridgewater (BAH)	48.70
800 metres	Kern Harripersad (TRI)	1:55.20 CR	Clayton James (JAM)	1:56.21	Simeon Bovell (TRI)	1:57.78
1500 metres	Kern Harripersad (TRI)	4:08.65	Trevon Baptiste (GRN)	4:10.30	Clayton James (JAM)	4:10.31
100 metres hurdles (-2.3 m/s)	Patrick Lee (JAM)	13.20 CR	Shamar Sands (BAH)	13.50	Jesse King (BAR)	13.53
400 metres hurdles	Patrick Lee (JAM)	53.00	Rodney George (GRN)	54.39	Andretti Bain (BAH)	54.58
High jump	Dorrain Coley (JAM)	1.95	Kieron Dickson (GRN)	1.95	Omar Wright (CAY)	1.90
Long jump	Dorrain Coley (JAM)	6.88 (-1.6 m/s)	Ayata Joseph (ATG)	6.77 (0.7 m/s)	Wilbert Walker (JAM)	6.62 (1.9 m/s)
Triple jump	Ayata Joseph (ATG)	13.71 (-2.9 m/s)	Carlos Mattis (JAM)	13.47 (-1.8 m/s)	Willy Montrop-Hippolyte (MTQ)	13.21 (-3.7 m/s)
Shot put	David Villeneuve (MTQ)	14.19	Walt Williams (GRN)	14.11	Daley Harris (BAR)	13.81
Discus throw	Walt Williams (GRN)	47.60	Shaun Haughton (JAM)	39.22	David Villeneuve (MTQ)	39.22
Javelin throw	Ryan Frederick (GRN)	55.27	Axel Caristan (MTQ)	54.40	Corey Jackson (BAR)	53.39
4 × 100 metres relay	Bahamas	41.14	Jamaica	42.59	Barbados	42.60

=== Girls under 17 (Youth) ===
Event	Gold		Silver		Bronze	
100 metres (0.0 m/s)	Simone Facey (JAM)	11.78	Wanda Hutson (TRI)	11.95	Tracy-Ann Rowe (JAM)	12.08
200 metres (-4.0 m/s)	Simone Facey (JAM)	24.15	Wanda Hutson (TRI)	24.59	Tracy-Ann Rowe (JAM)	24.87
400 metres	Anneisha McLaughlin (JAM)	54.22	Danielle Watson (BER)	55.96	Kashain Page (JAM)	56.17
800 metres	Kayann Thompson (JAM)	2:11.76	Sarana Patterson (GRN)	2:15.99	Sade St. Louis (TRI)	2:16.04
1500 metres	Janill Williams (ATG)	4:37.87	Lorain McKenzie (JAM)	4:41.14	Kayann Thompson (JAM)	4:44.83
100 metres hurdles (-1.3 m/s)	Keisha Brown (JAM)	14.09	Latoya Greaves (JAM)	14.25	Marty Phillip (GRN)	14.93
300 metres hurdles	Trishana McGowan (JAM)	42.98	Euzhan Varlin (MTQ)	44.37	Keisha Brown (JAM)	44.47
High jump	Zindzi Swan (BER)	1.71	Rhonda Watkins (TRI)	1.68	Anna-Kay Campbell (JAM)	1.65
Long jump	Peta-Gaye Beckford (JAM)	5.93	Euzhan Varlin (MTQ)	5.59	Sharlene Bailey (BAR)	5.23 (0.2 m/s)
Shot put	Brittney Marshall (BER)	11.95	Sandy Tros (GLP)	11.95	Peta-Gaye Beckford (JAM)	10.85
Discus throw	Peta-Gaye Beckford (JAM)	37.44	Keisha Walkes (BAR)	35.48	Valérie Dicot (MTQ)	35.12
Javelin throw	Nathalia Vincent (GRN)	42.17	Shakarah Kemp (BAH)	36.65	Anna Lovell (BAR)	36.01
4 × 100 metres relay	Jamaica; Keisha Brown; Tracy-Ann Rowe; Anneisha McLaughlin; Simone Facey	45.44	Bahamas	47.23	Bermuda	47.44

== Medal table (unofficial) ==
* Host nation (Barbados)

Rank	Nation	Gold	Silver	Bronze	Total
1	Jamaica (JAM)	26	20	17	63
2	Grenada (GRN)	8	7	2	17
3	Trinidad and Tobago (TTO)	7	8	4	19
4	Martinique (MTQ)	6	6	9	21
5	Bahamas (BAH)	4	5	7	16
6	Barbados (BAR)*	3	8	12	23
7	Antigua and Barbuda (ATG)	3	1	0	4
8	Guadeloupe (GLP)	2	2	6	10
9	Bermuda (BER)	2	2	1	5
10	Saint Lucia (LCA)	1	0	2	3
11	Saint Kitts and Nevis (SKN)	0	1	1	2
12	French Guiana (GUF)	0	1	0	1
12	Guyana (GUY)	0	1	0	1
14	Cayman Islands (CAY)	0	0	1	1
Totals (14 entries)		62	62	62	186
