= 1998 Central American and Caribbean Junior Championships in Athletics =

XIII Central American and Caribbean Junior Championships
- Dates: 10–12 July
- Host city: Georgetown, Cayman Islands
- Venue: Truman Bodden Sports Complex
- Level: Junior and Youth
- Events: 79 (41 junior, 38 youth)
- Participation: about 361 (187 junior, 174 youth) athletes from 21 nations
- Records set: 19 championship records

The 13th Central American and Caribbean Junior Championships were held in the Truman Bodden Sports Complex in Georgetown, Cayman Islands between 10–12 July 1998.

== Records ==
A total of 19 new championship records were set.

Event	Record	Athlete	Country	Type
Boys Under 20 (Junior)
100 m	10.38 s (1.4 m/s)	Roy Bailey	Jamaica	CR
800 m	1:49.41	Dwayne Miller	Jamaica	CR
4 × 100 m relay	39.84	Paul Thompson; Dwight Thomas; Steve Slowly; Roy Bailey	Jamaica	CR
Girls Under 20 (Junior)
200 m	23.43s (0.7 m/s)	Fana Ashby	Trinidad and Tobago	CR
400 m hurdles	57.89	Peta-Gaye Gayle	Jamaica	CR
4 × 100 m relay	45.24s^{†}	Tulia Robinson; Danielle Browning; Elva Goulbourne; Althea Johnson	Jamaica	CR
Boys Under 17 (Youth)
100 m	10.69s^{†} (1.2 m/s)	Omar Brown	Jamaica	CR
200 m	21.47s (0.8 m/s)	Omar Brown	Jamaica	CR
100 m hurdles	13.09s (1.0 m/s)	Dwayne Robinson	Jamaica	CR
400 m hurdles	53.34s	Jason Hunte	Barbados	CR
Pole vault	4.20m	Erik Corral	Mexico	CR
4 × 100 m relay	42.12s	Nicholas Denniser; Davaon Spence; DeWayne Barnett; Omar Brown	Jamaica	CR
Girls Under 17 (Youth)
200 m	23.55s (1.4 m/s)	Melaine Walker	Jamaica	CR
100 m hurdles	13.72s	Alicia Cave	Trinidad and Tobago	CR
300 m hurdles	41.33s	Patricia Hall	Jamaica	CR
Triple jump	12.22m (-1.1 m/s)	Raneika Bean	Bermuda	CR
4000 metres track walk	20:44.48	Diana Flores	Mexico	CR
4 × 100 m relay	45.35	Nadine Palmer; Lisa Sharpe; Melaine Walker; Veronica Campbell	Jamaica	CR
4 × 400 m relay	3:40.65	Tameisha Gutherie; Patricia Hall; Shauna-Kay Campbell; Melaine Walker	Jamaica	CR

Key

AR — Area record • CR — Championship record • NR — National record

^{†}: Electronic timing. Still better hand timing results.

== Medal summary ==
Complete results are published on the CFPI and on the World Junior Athletics History website, and medal winners are published by category: Junior A, Male, Junior A, Female, and Junior B.

=== Male Junior A (under 20) ===
Event	Gold		Silver		Bronze	
100 metres (1.4 m/s)	Roy Bailey (JAM)	10.38 CR	Jermaine Esprit (AHO)	10.53	Jairo Duzant (AHO)	10.58
200 metres (1.1 m/s)	Steve Slowly (JAM)	20.99	Jairo Duzant (AHO)	21.00	Simon Pierre (TRI)	21.28
400 metres	Simon Pierre (TRI)	46.80	Leroy Colquhoun (JAM)	47.56	Jesús Torres (PUR)	47.68
800 metres	Dwayne Miller (JAM)	1:49.41 CR	Marlon Greensword (JAM)	1:49.47	Sherridan Kirk (TRI)	1:50.78
1500 metres	Aldwyn Sappleton (JAM)	4:03.87	Dorlan Jacobs (ATG)	4:04.52	Freddy Velázquez (GUA)	4:05.71
5000 metres	Andrés Mendoza (MEX)	15:37.23	Jonathan Morales (MEX)	15:39.60	Matthew Debrilla (TRI)	16:09.27
10,000 metres	Andrés Mendoza (MEX)	31:57.00	Jonathan Morales (MEX)	33:46.69	Matthew Debrilla (TRI)	35:24.48
3000 metres steeplechase	Alejandro García (MEX)	9:52.07	Selvyn Molineros (GUA)	10:03.61		
110 metres hurdles (0.5 m/s)	Dwight Thomas (JAM)	14.40	Hugh Henry (BAR)	14.73	Quayne Baccas (JAM)	15.25
400 metres hurdles	Ryan Clarke (JAM)	52.04	David Lloyd (JAM)	52.33	Edwin Esparra (PUR)	52.51
High jump	Kevin Cumberbatch (BAR)	2.02	Ricardo Santiago (PUR)	1.99	Ángel Treviño (MEX)	1.99
Pole vault	Makirk Ramos (PUR)	4.50	César Nava (MEX)	4.30	Jabari Ennis (JAM)	4.20
Long jump	Aundre Edwards (JAM)	7.45 (-1.0 m/s)	Leevan Sands (BAH)	7.26 (-1.6 m/s)	Deswell Gardner (BAH)	7.13 (-2.5 m/s)
Triple jump	Leevan Sands (BAH)	15.66	Benaud Shirley (JAM)	15.52	Deswell Gardner (BAH)	14.75
Shot put	Víctor Bisbal (PUR)	15.39	Manuel Repollet (PUR)	15.28	Patrick Harding (GUY)	14.78
Discus throw	Patrick Harding (GUY)	46.33	Diego Quiñones (MEX)	46.05	Evelier Sánchez (MEX)	44.78
Hammer throw^{†}	César Chaparro (MEX)	46.52	Felipe Surquis (MEX)	45.80		
Javelin throw	Terry Nurse (BAR)	61.40	Richard Rock (BAR)	59.48	Javier Alonso (MEX)	55.50
Decathlon	Claston Bernard (JAM)	6673	Micky Ruben (TRI)	5867	Jorge Galván (MEX)	5509
10,000 metres track walk	Mario Iván Flores (MEX)	46:57.46	César Cuel (MEX)	49:18.32	Mario Alegría (GUA)	50:35.88
4 × 100 metres relay	Jamaica; Paul Thompson; Dwight Thomas; Steve Slowly; Roy Bailey	39.84 CR	Cayman Islands; Himma McLaughlin; Adrian McLaughlin; Rico Boddon; Roger Smith	41.72	Barbados; Maurice Clarke; Fabian Moore; Troy Wickham; Hugh Henry	41.75
4 × 400 metres relay	Jamaica; Collin Thomas; Sanjay Ayre; Leroy Colquhoun; Dwayne Miller	3:06.77	Mexico; Carlos Jiménez; Nazario Padilla; Roberto Carbajal; Manuel Vázquez	3:13.29	Puerto Rico; Jesús Torres; Esteban Castro; Edwin Esparra; Jairo Velázquez	3:15.20

^{†}: Event marked as exhibition.

=== Female Junior A (under 20) ===
Event	Gold		Silver		Bronze	
100 metres (0.7 m/s)	Tulia Robinson (JAM)	11.56	Fana Ashby (TRI)	11.58	Sonia Williams (ATG)	11.68
200 metres (0.7 m/s)	Fana Ashby (TRI)	23.43 CR	Sonia Williams (ATG)	23.86	Danielle Browning (JAM)	24.13
400 metres	Keasha Downer (JAM)	53.36	Hazel-Ann Regis (GRN)	54.51	Ángeles Pantoja (MEX)	55.00
800 metres	Karen Gayle (JAM)	2:09.82	Melissa de Leon (TRI)	2:11.15	Aileen Smith (JAM)	2:11.98
1500 metres	Martha Tripp (MEX)	4:37.51	Aileen Smith (JAM)	4:43.23	Petrona McClymont (JAM)	4:43.73
5000 metres	Madai Pérez (MEX)	17:41.88	Martha Tripp (MEX)	18:26.70	Irmalin Falcón (PUR)	19:18.88
100 metres hurdles (2.0 m/s)	Makeda Prime (TRI)	14.28w	Astrid Stoopen (MEX)	14.29w	Keitha Moseley (BAR)	14.30w
400 metres hurdles	Peta-Gaye Gayle (JAM)	57.89 CR	Ángeles Pantoja (MEX)	60.03	Allison Beckford (JAM)	60.07
High jump	Shelly-Ann Gallimore (JAM)	1.74	Kelsie Johnson (BAH)	1.71	Mireya Beltrán (MEX)	1.71
Long jump	Cameal Rhule (JAM)	5.96 (-0.7 m/s)	Elva Goulbourne (JAM)	5.95 (-1.4 m/s)	Kelsie Johnson (BAH)	5.88 (-2.1 m/s)
Triple jump	Shelly-Ann Gallimore (JAM)	12.64	Christine Brown (JAM)	12.61	Paola Moncayo (MEX)	12.38
Shot put	Melissa Gibbons (JAM)	13.68	Candice Scott (TRI)	12.78	Tanya Thomas (JAM)	12.48
Discus throw	Tanya Thomas (JAM)	45.87	Melissa Gibbons (JAM)	43.21	Yeni Hinojosa (MEX)	41.52
Hammer throw^{†}	Jéssica Ponce (MEX)	50.22	Nahomy Pérez (PUR)	47.44		
Javelin throw	Nereida Ríos (MEX)	43.54	Tanya Thomas (JAM)	42.81	Shanell Andrews (BAH)	42.00
Heptathlon	Cameal Rhule (JAM)	4771	Keisha Harvey (JAM)	4700	Solángel Rubio (MEX)	4557
5000 metres track walk	Vianey Pedraza (MEX)	26:04.28	Nelly Espitia (MEX)	26:39.79	Nadeshka Negrón (PUR)	28:24.66
4 × 100 metres relay	Jamaica; Tulia Robinson; Danielle Browning; Elva Goulbourne; Althea Johnson	45.24 CR	Bahamas; Juanita Ferguson; Tamica Clarke; Tamara Cherebin; Marcia Dorsett	45.99	Puerto Rico; Jeniffer Marrero; Glynette Rodriguez; Beatriz Cruz; Madeline Morales	47.49
4 × 400 metres relay	Jamaica; Shellene Williams; Keasha Downer; Peta-Gaye Gayle; Allison Beckford	3:36.02	Mexico; Michelle Barraza; Diana García; Amiel Ruíz; Angeles Pantoga	3:51.19	Puerto Rico; Damaris Diana; Beatriz Cruz; Jeniffer Marrero; Glynette Rodríguez	3:54.89

^{†}: Event marked as exhibition.

=== Male Junior B (under 17) ===
Event	Gold		Silver		Bronze	
100 metres (1.2 m/s)	Omar Brown (JAM)	10.69 CR	Darrel Brown (TRI)	10.82	Marc Burns (TRI)	10.83
200 metres (0.8 m/s)	Omar Brown (JAM)	21.47 CR	Marc Burns (TRI)	21.93	David Hamil (CAY)	21.94
400 metres	Wilan Louis (BAR)	48.19	Damion Barry (TRI)	49.03	Jason Hunte (BAR)	49.45
800 metres	Jameel Wilson (TRI)	1:55.79	Dwight McCaulsky (JAM)	1:56.42	Kenrick Ferrill (JAM)	1:57.15
1500 metres	José García (MEX)	4:14.17	Rolando Ramos (PUR)	4:14.95	Anton Bruce (TRI)	4:15.06
3000 metres	José García (MEX)	9:06.29	Eder Cortés (MEX)	9:08.03	Anton Bruce (TRI)	9:23.28
2000 metres steeplechase	Edwin Cedeño (PUR)	6:47.30	Kenny Rodríguez (PUR)	7:06.53	José Reyes (MEX)	9:23.50
100 metres hurdles (1.0 m/s)	Dwayne Robinson (JAM)	13.09 CR	Ricardo Melbourne (JAM)	13.39	Robert Ibeh (CAY)	14.14
400 metres hurdles	Jason Hunte (BAR)	53.34 CR	Marco Tamayo (MEX)	53.70	Ricardo Melbourne (JAM)	53.85
High jump	Naron Stewart (JAM)	2.07	Christopher Morrison (JAM)	2.01	Nery Toro (PUR)	2.01
Pole vault	Erik Corral (MEX)	4.20 CR	Luis López (MEX)	4.00	Pierre Devarie (PUR)	3.70
Long jump	Dwayne Greenidge (BAR)	6.80 (-1.1 m/s)	Paul Rumble (JAM)	6.71 (-0.6 m/s)	Kerron Johnson (TRI)	6.53 (-0.6 m/s)
Triple jump	Dwayne Greenidge (BAR)	14.44 (-0.7 m/s)	Christopher Morrison (JAM)	13.79 (-0.4 m/s)	Paul Rumble (JAM)	13.77 (-0.5 m/s)
Shot put	Shamir Thomas (GRN)	14.20	Godfrey Ellis (BAH)	14.20	Luis García (MEX)	14.06
Discus throw	Dwayne DaCosta (JAM)	40.94	Shamir Thomas (GRN)	40.59	Michael Gibson (BAR)	39.28
Hammer throw	Luis García (MEX)	50.74	Omar Ortíz (PUR)	48.72	Alexis Ramos (ESA)	43.66
Javelin throw	José Benítez (PUR)	57.76	Shane Brandford (BAR)	56.38	Gustavo Glaus (MEX)	52.10
Heptathlon	Brent Harry (TRI)	4666	Cleavon Dillon (TRI)	4102	Franz Smith (JAM)	4100
5000 metres track walk^{†}	José Reyes (MEX)	22:21.75	Pedro Corbin (BAR)	34:31.72		
4 × 100 metres relay	Jamaica; Nicholas Denniser; Davaon Spence; DeWayne Barnett; Omar Brown	42.12 CR	Trinidad and Tobago; Damion Barry; Marc Burns; Anthony Fredrick; Darrel Brown	42.21	Bahamas; Ron Fraser; Barton Duncanson; Clement Taylor; Theron Smith	42.64
4 × 400 metres relay	Barbados; Dwayne Greenidge; Jason Hunte; Jamal Nedo; Wilan Louis	3:16.81	Trinidad and Tobago; Jameel Wilson; Brent Harry; Marc Burns; Damion Barry	3:18.80	Bahamas; Sambrino Williams; Ron Fraser; Barton Duncanson; Theron Smith	3:20.08

^{†}: Event marked as exhibition.

=== Female Junior B (under 17) ===
Event	Gold		Silver		Bronze	
100 metres (2.4 m/s)	Veronica Campbell (JAM)	11.72 w	Lisa Sharpe (JAM)	11.78 w	Rodneshya Pitts (ISV)	11.82 w
200 metres (0.0 m/s)	Melaine Walker (JAM)	23.55 CR	Lisa Sharpe (JAM)	24.20	Alicia Cave (TRI)	24.38
400 metres	Patricia Hall (JAM)	54.54	Renee Clarke (TRI)	55.84	Kishara George (GRN)	56.47
800 metres	Althea Chambers (JAM)	2:12.48	Sheila Mercado (PUR)	2:14.94	Stacey Quashie (ATG)	2:15.45
1200 metres	Stacey Quashie (ATG)	3:36.90	Althea Chambers (JAM)	3:38.48	Nerissa Pelle (ATG)	3:41.60
100 metres hurdles (0.8 m/s)	Alicia Cave (TRI)	13.72 CR	Verónica Quijano (ESA)	14.47	Schwannah McCarthy (CAY)	14.76
300 metres hurdles	Patricia Hall (JAM)	41.33 CR	Alicia Cave (TRI)	41.62	Verónica Quijano (ESA)	43.33
High jump	Sheree Francis (JAM)	1.73	Desiree Crichlow (BAR)	1.70	Raneika Bean (BER)	1.61
Long jump	Sheree Francis (JAM)	5.50 (-0.3 m/s)	Shauna-Gaye Stephens (JAM)	5.27 (-0.5 m/s)	Calicia Burke (CAY)	5.19 (-0.4 m/s)
Triple jump	Raneika Bean (BER)	12.22 CR (-1.1 m/s)	Adriana Romo (MEX)	11.09 (-0.5 m/s)	Stacy Babb (BER)	10.55 (-2.3 m/s)
Shot put	Shernelle Nicholls (BAR)	12.44	María Sánchez (MEX)	12.09	Jania Bonafe (PUR)	11.55
Discus throw	Shernelle Nicholls (BAR)	37.33	María Sánchez (MEX)	36.23	Ester Velasco (MEX)	34.45
Javelin throw	Ana Gutiérrez (MEX)	38.16	Nikkisha Maynard (BAR)	37.23	Jania Bonafe (PUR)	36.57
Pentathlon	Shauna-Gaye Stephens (JAM)	3371	Lucila Contreras (MEX)	3228	Althea Akeins (JAM)	3160
4000 metres track walk	Diana Flores (MEX)	20:44.48 CR	Alejandra León (ESA)	22:46.34	Jeditza Arroyo (PUR)	23:07.60
4 × 100 metres relay	Jamaica; Nadine Palmer; Lisa Sharpe; Melaine Walker; Veronica Campbell	45.35 CR	Cayman Islands; Keisha James Calicia Burke; Crystal Robinson	49.05	Puerto Rico; Mayra Pérez; Elizabeth Rivera; Waleska Ayala; Sydiannet Dalmau	50.03
4 × 400 metres relay	Jamaica; Tameisha Gutherie; Patricia Hall; Shauna-Kay Campbell; Melaine Walker	3:40.65 CR	Puerto Rico; Sheila Mercado; Lysaira Del Valle; Eva Guzmán; Waleska Ayala	4:03.01	Cayman Islands; Schwannah McCarthy; Gabriella Myles; Crystal Robinson; Calicia Burke	4:03.19

== Medal table (unofficial) ==
* Host nation (Cayman Islands)

Rank	Nation	Gold	Silver	Bronze	Total
1	Jamaica	38	19	12	69
2	Mexico	17	19	13	49
3	Barbados	9	6	4	19
4	Trinidad and Tobago	6	12	9	27
5	Puerto Rico	4	8	13	25
6	Bahamas	1	4	6	11
7	Netherlands Antilles	1	2	3	6
8	Grenada	1	2	1	4
9	Bermuda	1	0	2	3
10	Guyana	1	0	1	2
11	Cayman Islands*	0	2	5	7
12	El Salvador	0	2	2	4
13	Netherlands Antilles	0	2	1	3
14	Guatemala	0	1	2	3
15	U.S. Virgin Islands	0	0	1	1
Totals (15 entries)		79	79	75	233

== Participation (unofficial) ==
The Commonwealth of Dominica competed for the first time at the championships. Detailed result lists can be found on the CFPI and on the World Junior Athletics History website. An unofficial count yields the number of about 361 athletes (187 junior (under-20) and 174 youth (under-17)) from about 21 countries:

- Anguilla (2)
- Antigua and Barbuda (5)
- Aruba (1)
- Bahamas (21)
- Barbados (23)
- Bermuda (7)
- British Virgin Islands (4)
- Cayman Islands (30)
- Dominica (1)
- El Salvador (7)
- Grenada (4)
- Guatemala (14)
- Guyana (2)
- Jamaica (76)
- (Mexico) México (74)
- Netherlands Antilles (2)
- Puerto Rico (47)
- Saint Lucia (2)
- Turks and Caicos Islands (3)
- Trinidad and Tobago (28)
- U.S. Virgin Islands (8)
