= 2000 Central American and Caribbean Junior Championships in Athletics =

XIV Central American and Caribbean Junior Championships
- Dates: 14–16 July
- Host city: San Juan, Puerto Rico
- Venue: Estadio Sixto Escobar
- Level: Junior and Youth
- Events: 80
- Participation: about 422 (260 junior, 162 youth) athletes from 31 nations
- Records set: 15 championship records

The 14th Central American and Caribbean Junior Championships were held in the Estadio Sixto Escobar in San Juan, Puerto Rico between 14–16 July 2000.

== Records ==
A total of 15 new championship records were set. The wind-assisted mark of 8.09 m (2.9 m/s) by Cleavon Dillon from Trinidad and Tobago was the best performance in long jump of the Male Junior A (U-20) category, as was the mark of 13.30 s (4.8 m/s) by Toni Ann D'Oyley from Jamaica in 100 metres hurdles of the Female Junior A (U-20) category, the mark of 21.46 s (2.4 m/s) by Darrel Brown from Trinidad and Tobago in 200 metres of the Male Junior B (U-17) category, the mark of 7.35 m (5.1 m/s) by Damion Young from Jamaica in long jump of the Male Junior B (U-17) category, and the mark of 6.17m (3.4 m/s) by Charisse Bacchus from Trinidad and Tobago in long jump of the Female Junior B (U-17) category, but all five could not be recognized as new records.

Event	Record	Athlete	Country	Type
Boys Under 20 (Junior)
Javelin Throw	69.91m	Edwin Cuesta	Venezuela	CR
10,000 metres Track Walk	41:29.66	Cristián David Berdeja	Mexico	CR
Girls Under 20 (Junior)
100 m	11.45s (1.7 m/s) (heat)	Nadine Palmer	Jamaica	CR
100 m	11.18s (1.2 m/s)	Veronica Campbell	Jamaica	CR
800 m	2:06.37	Kareen Gayle	Jamaica	CR
High Jump	1.86m	Sheree Francis	Jamaica	CR
Long Jump	6.47m (1.4 m/s)	Nolle Graham	Jamaica	CR
4 × 100 m relay	44.26s	Shereefa Lloyd; Nadine Palmer; Veronica Campbell; Nolle Graham	Jamaica	CR
Boys Under 17 (Youth)
100 m	10.47s (1.2 m/s)	Darrel Brown	Trinidad and Tobago	CR
400 m	48.14s	Kimani Williams	Jamaica	CR
Javelin Throw	61.81m	Jamal Forde	Barbados	CR
4 × 100 m relay	41.62s	Chevon Simpson; Darrel Brown; Marlon St. Louis; Dion Rodriguez	Trinidad and Tobago	CR
Girls Under 17 (Youth)
100 m	11.67s (1.4 m/s)	Lisa Sharpe	Jamaica	CR
400 m	53.54s	Anneisha McLaughlin	Jamaica	CR
4 × 400 m relay	3:40.40	Anna-Kay Campbell; Kashain Page; Camille Robinson; Anneisha McLaughlin	Jamaica	CR

Key

AR — Area record • CR — Championship record • NR — National record

== Medal summary ==
Complete results are published on a day by day basis, and medal winners are published by category: Junior A, Male, Junior A, Female, and Junior B.

=== Male Junior A (under 20) ===
Event	Gold		Silver		Bronze	
100 metres (0.4 m/s)	Marvin Anderson (JAM)	10.56	Helly Ollarves (VEN)	10.57	Michael Frater (JAM)	10.58
200 metres (2.0 m/s)	Omar Brown (JAM)	21.10	Helly Ollarves (VEN)	21.44	Jacner Palacios (COL)	21.50
400 metres	Brandon Simpson (JAM)	46.49	Pete Coley (JAM)	47.28	Damion Barry (TRI)	47.48
800 metres	Aldwyn Sappleton (JAM)	1:51.84	Simoncito Silvera (VEN)	1:52.28	Heleodoro Navarro (MEX)	1:53.28
1500 metres	Heleodoro Navarro (MEX)	3:57.73	Simoncito Silvera (VEN)	3:58.76	Rolando Ramos (PUR)	4:01.14
5000 metres	Antonio Cortez (MEX)	15:07.72	Sergio de León Solís (GUA)	15:20.86	Vishwanauth Sukmongal (GUY)	15:35.48
10,000 metres	Sergio de León Solís (GUA)	32:16.20	José Nevares (PUR)	32:46.51	Vishwanauth Sukmongal (GUY)	33:37.48
3000 metres steeplechase	Erick Bonilla Rosa (ESA)	9:29.08	Leomart Albert (PUR)	10:02.79	Johan Mendes (PUR)	10:08.04
110 metres hurdles (4.4 m/s)	Dwayne Robinson (JAM)	14.21 w	Ricardo Melbourne (JAM)	14.47 w	Marlián Reina (VEN)	14.58 w
400 metres hurdles	Jorge Chaverra (COL)	52.98	Greg Little (JAM)	53.24	Nimal Bailey (JAM)	53.51
High jump	Germaine Mason (JAM)	2.15	Damon Thompson (BAR)	2.05	Christopher Morrison (JAM)	2.05
Pole vault	Kenneth Goodridge (TRI)	3.95	Pierre Devarieaux (PUR)	3.70	Pedro Fuentes (ESA)	3.50
Long jump	Cleavon Dillon (TRI)	8.09 w (2.9 m/s)	Leevan Sands (BAH)	7.83 (0.8 m/s)	Víctor Castillo (VEN)	7.77 w (2.8 m/s)
Triple jump	Leevan Sands (BAH)	15.95 w (3.8 m/s)	Nicholas Neufville (JAM)	15.55 w (3.1 m/s)	Jason Edwards (BAH)	15.20 w (3.5 m/s)
Shot put	Manuel Repollet (PUR)	16.18	Edmundo Martínez (VEN)	15.57	Albert Ramírez (DOM)	15.55
Discus throw	Dwayne Henclewood (JAM)	51.10	Héctor Hurtado (VEN)	49.13	Albert Ramírez (DOM)	46.67
Hammer throw	Omar Ortíz (PUR)	45.95				
Javelin throw	Edwin Cuesta (VEN)	69.91 CR	Ronald Noguera (VEN)	64.94	Keron Francis (GRN)	59.73
Decathlon	Rubén Arcía (VEN)	6387	Samuel Prescod (BAR)	5977	Juan Tenorio (MEX)	5864
10,000 metres track walk	Cristián David Berdeja (MEX)	41:29.66 CR	Omar Segura (MEX)	42:53.42		
4 × 100 metres relay	Jamaica; Marvin Anderson; Omar Brown; Michael Frater; Steve Mullings	40.39	Trinidad and Tobago; Carron Williams; Marc Burns; Kirk Rudder; Cleavon Dillon	40.56	Barbados; Stephen Taitt; Wilan Louis; Taiwo Sodeyi; Kevin Bartlett	41.27
4 × 400 metres relay	Jamaica; Pete Coley; Alwyn Sappleton; Sékou Clarke; Brandon Simpson	3:08.42	Venezuela; William Hernández; Jonathan Palma; Danny Núñez; Simoncito Silvera	3:12.59	Trinidad and Tobago; Sheridan Kirk; Asim James; Jameel Wilson; Damion Barry	3:12.84

=== Female Junior A (under 20) ===
Event	Gold		Silver		Bronze	
100 metres (1.2 m/s)	Veronica Campbell (JAM)	11.18 CR	Nadine Palmer (JAM)	11.36	Fana Ashby (TRI)	11.57
200 metres (2.5 m/s)	Fana Ashby (TRI)	23.67 w	Nolle Graham (JAM)	23.84 w	Norma González (COL)	24.27 w
400 metres	Hazel-Ann Regis (GRN)	53.32	Sheryl Morgan (JAM)	54.03	Norma González (COL)	54.54
800 metres	Kareen Gayle (JAM)	2:06.37 CR	Sheena Gooding (BAR)	2:06.63	Lysaira del Valle (PUR)	2:08.75
1500 metres	Valentina Medina (VEN)	4:35.68	María Elena Valencia (MEX)	4:35.70	Tanice Barnett (JAM)	4:37.76
3000 metres	Meleshia Spencer (JAM)	10:15.96	Giselle Coira (PUR)	10:20.57	María Díaz (PUR)	10:31.43
5000 metres	Valentina Medina (VEN)	17:50.72	Alma Xicotencatl (MEX)	17:56.42	Giselle Coira (PUR)	18:15.93
100 metres hurdles (4.8 m/s)	Toni Ann D'Oyley (JAM)	13.30 w	Keitha Moseley (BAR)	13.71 w	Alicia Cave (TRI)	13.77 w
400 metres hurdles	Melaine Walker (JAM)	59.65	Yusmelys García (VEN)	60.39	Alicia Cave (TRI)	60.52
2000 metres steeplechase						
High jump	Sheree Francis (JAM)	1.86 CR	Celly Martínez (MEX)	1.77	Melba Colón (PUR); Laura de Jesús (PUR)	1.57; 1.57
Pole vault	Yoisemil Fuentes (VEN)	3.25	Michelle Rivera (ESA)	3.20	Denise Jerez Agueda (GUA)	3.10
Long jump	Nolle Graham (JAM)	6.47 CR (1.4 m/s)	Onika James (TRI)	6.30 (1.5 m/s)	Rose Ann Hamilton (JAM)	6.14 w (2.4 m/s)
Triple jump	Shelly-Ann Gallimore (JAM)	13.15 w (4.0 m/s)	Jennifer Arveláez (VEN)	13.10 w (3.4 m/s)	María Espencer (DOM)	12.73 w (5.5 m/s)
Shot put	Yanira Hurtado (VEN)	14.18	Kamesha Marshall (JAM)	13.10	Yania Banafé (PUR)	12.66
Discus throw	Chafree Bain (BAH)	44.05	Kamesha Marshall (JAM)	42.35	Bernadette Welds (CAY)	34.68
Hammer throw	Dubraska Rodríguez (VEN)	47.46	Anneris Méndez (DOM)	45.66	Amarilys Alméstica (PUR)	44.45
Javelin throw	Ana Gutiérrez (MEX)	46.28	Gracelis Vega (PUR)	41.16	Brenda-Grace Hunt (JAM)	41.07
Heptathlon	Keitha Moseley (BAR)	4723 w	Lauren Maul (BAR)	4713 w	Yudith Méndez (DOM)	4703 w
5000 metres track walk	Natalia García (MEX)	25:06.34	Mariela Rivera (MEX)	25:10.47	Jeditza Arroyo (PUR)	26:21.77
4 × 100 metres relay	Jamaica; Shereefa Lloyd; Nadine Palmer; Veronica Campbell; Nolle Graham	44.26 CR	Trinidad and Tobago; Onika James; Fana Ashby; Alicia Cave; Kimberly Walker	46.20	Puerto Rico; Madeline Morales; Briseida Ferrari; Linnete Gerna; Franchesca Cardona	48.60
4 × 400 metres relay	Jamaica; Sashanie Simpson; Sheryl Morgan; Melaine Walker; Shellene Williams	3:36.14	Grenada; Kishara George; Neisha Bernard; Jackie-Ann Morain; Hazel-Ann Regis	3:40.24	Puerto Rico; Lysaira del Valle; Linnete Gerna; Madeline Morales; Carmen Valdés	3:54.14

=== Male Junior B (under 17) ===
Event	Gold		Silver		Bronze	
100 metres (1.2 m/s)	Darrel Brown (TRI)	10.47 CR	Dion Rodriguez (TRI)	10.70	Damion Young (JAM)	10.93
200 metres (2.4 m/s)	Darrel Brown (TRI)	21.46 w	Dion Rodriguez (TRI)	21.74 w	André Maxwell (JAM)	21.92 w
400 metres	Kimani Williams (JAM)	48.14 CR	Melville Rogers (SKN)	48.99	Kevin Straker (TRI)	49.17
800 metres	Olwin Granado (VEN)	1:57.41	Joel Pile (TRI)	1:59.35	Dwayne Higgins (JAM)	1:59.50
1500 metres	Yair Cedazo (MEX)	3:59.19	Olwin Granado (VEN)	4:01.40	Kern Harripersad (TRI)	4:03.92
3000 metres	Julio Martínez (MEX)	9:05.4	Keston Nero (TRI)	9:11.2	Olwin Granado (VEN)	9:22.9
2000 metres steeplechase	Yair Cedazo (MEX)	6:06.05	David Rosa (PUR)	6:25.72	Arnaldo Rodríguez (PUR)	7:07.57
100 metres hurdles (4.0 m/s)	Patrick Lee (JAM)	13.15 w	Adalberto Amador (PUR)	13.16 w	Norhiher Marín (MEX)	13.51 w
400 metres hurdles	Patrick Lee (JAM)	54.21	Kemar Smith (JAM)	56.08	Rhenardo Forbes (BAH)	57.41
High jump	Adrian Cephas (JAM)	1.93	José Rivera (PUR); Omar Wright (CAY)	1.83; 1.83		
Pole vault	Héctor García (PUR)	2.75	Marcos Sánchez-Valle (PUR)	2.50		
Long jump	Damion Young (JAM)	7.35 w (5.1 m/s)	Jarrett Russell (BAH)	6.88 w (4.8 m/s)	Kimani Williams (JAM)	6.82 w (4.5 m/s)
Triple jump	Kemar Smith (JAM)	14.07 w (4.9 m/s)	Adrian Cephas (JAM)	14.03 w (5.5 m/s)	Leon George (GRN)	13.93 w (3.8 m/s)
Shot put	Kimani Kirton (JAM)	15.55	Juan Jaramillo (VEN)	15.25	Ricardo Page (JAM)	13.04
Discus throw	Eric Mathias (IVB)	48.24	Ricardo Page (JAM)	47.64	Michael Letterlough (CAY)	42.57
Hammer throw	Diego Berrios (GUA)	47.24				
Javelin throw	Jamal Forde (BAR)	61.81 CR	Densley Joseph (GRN)	61.79	Juan Santana (VEN)	59.83
Octathlon						
5000 metres track walk	Álvaro García (MEX)	24:28.53	Walter Sandoval (ESA)	25:06.47	José Medina (PUR)	25:06.79
4 × 100 metres relay	Trinidad and Tobago; Chevon Simpson; Darrel Brown; Marlon St. Louis; Dion Rodriguez	41.62 CR	Puerto Rico Ethien Santana; Ismael Rosado; Omar Ortíz	42.72	Bahamas; Rhenardo Forbes; Grafton Ifill; Jarett Russell	43.33
4 × 400 metres relay	Trinidad and Tobago; Kellon Francis; Kevin Straker; Kyle St. Louis; Joel Pile	3:21.56	Bahamas; Rhenardo Forbes; Drameco Bridgewater; Devon Armbrister; Grafton Ifill	3:24.71	Puerto Rico; Noel Negrón; Ethien Santana; Luciano Andino; Felix Martínez	3:25.70

=== Female Junior B (under 17) ===
Event	Gold		Silver		Bronze	
100 metres (1.4 m/s)	Lisa Sharpe (JAM)	11.67 CR	Genna Williams (BAR)	11.86	Kerron Stewart (JAM)	11.92
200 metres (2.3 m/s)	Simone Facey (JAM)	24.14 w	Tiandra Ponteen (SKN)	24.24 w	Kerron Stewart (JAM)	24.51 w
400 metres	Anneisha McLaughlin (JAM)	53.54 CR	Tiandra Ponteen (SKN)	54.32	Kashain Page (JAM)	54.45
800 metres	Carlene Robinson (JAM)	2:13.53	Sheila Mercado (PUR)	2:13.95	Gabriela Medina (MEX)	2:13.99
1200 metres	Cadien Beckford (JAM)	3:39.60	Kay-Ann Thompson (JAM)	3:41.85	Liliani Méndez (PUR)	3:44.96
100 metres hurdles	Nadina Marsh (JAM)	13.96	Schwannah McCarthy (CAY)	14.05	Keisha Brown (JAM)	14.07
300 metres hurdles	Camille Robinson (JAM)	43.00	Josanne Lucas (TRI)	45.34	Charisse Bacchus (TRI)	47.19
High jump	Shaunette Davidson (JAM)	1.72	Peaches Roach (JAM)	1.72	Jhoris Luque (VEN)	1.72
Long jump	Charisse Bacchus (TRI)	6.17 w (3.4 m/s)	Nadina Marsh (JAM)	6.04 w (3.8 m/s)	Yuridia Bustamante (MEX)	6.00 w (3.3 m/s)
Triple jump	Desiree Crichlow (BAR)	11.85 (-0.8 m/s)	Gabriela Carrillo (ESA)	11.42 (0.2 m/s)	Esthela Díaz (MEX)	11.14 (-2.1 m/s)
Shot put	Shernelle Nicholls (BAR)	13.65	Brittney Marshall (BER)	12.70	Nathyan Catano (PAN)	12.39
Discus throw	Shernelle Nicholls (BAR)	41.86	Peta-Gaye Beckford (JAM)	34.61	Sandrena Small (BAR)	33.98
Javelin throw	Shakirah Kemp (BAH)	31.53	Natalia Vincent (GRN)	31.27	Yalitza Rivera (PUR)	17.40
Pentathlon	Charisse Bacchus (TRI)	3381 w	Yalitza Rivera (PUR)	3278	Ayana Riviere (TRI)	3202
4000 metres Track Walk	Daisy González (MEX)	20:55.64	Dianette Vázquez (PUR)	22:00.64	Estela Hernández (MEX)	22:54.72
4 × 100 metres relay	Jamaica; Shaunette Davidson; Kerron Stewart; Simone Facey; Lisa Sharpe	45.66	Trinidad and Tobago; Josanne Lucas; Wanda Hutson; Danille Prime; Cherisse Bacchus	47.91	Bahamas; Tamara Rigby; Utica Edgecombe; Cara Saunders; Astra Curry	48.47
4 × 400 metres relay	Jamaica; Anna-Kay Campbell; Kashain Page; Camille Robinson; Anneisha McLaughlin	3:40.40 CR	Trinidad and Tobago; Kiza Francis; Wanda Hutson; Carline McLean; Danille Prime	3:51.48	Bahamas; Tavara Rigby; Astra Curry; Utica Edgecombe; Tamara Rigby	3:57.71

== Medal table ==
* Host nation (Puerto Rico)

Rank	Nation	Gold	Silver	Bronze	Total
1	Jamaica	36	16	15	67
2	Mexico	10	5	8	23
3	Trinidad and Tobago	9	10	9	28
4	Venezuela	8	12	5	25
5	Barbados	5	6	3	14
6	Puerto Rico*	4	16	34	54
7	Bahamas	4	3	5	12
8	Guatemala	2	1	1	4
9	Grenada	1	3	2	6
10	El Salvador	1	3	1	5
11	Colombia	1	0	3	4
12	British Virgin Islands	1	0	0	1
13	Saint Kitts and Nevis	0	3	0	3
14	Cayman Islands	0	2	2	4
15	Dominican Republic	0	1	4	5
16	Bermuda	0	1	0	1
16	Saint Lucia	0	1	0	1
18	Guyana	0	0	2	2
19	Panama	0	0	1	1
Totals (19 entries)		82	83	95	260

^{*}:There is a mismatch between the unofficial medal count and the published medal count above. The unofficial count results in only 3 gold medals for both the Bahamas and Puerto Rico, only 13 silver medals for Puerto Rico, no silver or any other medal for Saint Lucia, and only 7 bronze medals for Mexico and only 2 bronze medals for Barbados. This could be explained by published results being incomplete. In the technical manual the events 2000 metres steeplechase in the Girls under 20 (Junior) category and Octathlon in the Boys under 17 (Youth) category were scheduled, but no results could be found. Assuming that the published medal tables are correct, and working through the published medal count, the following result could tentatively be assigned: 2000 metres steeplechase girls (U-20): gold for Puerto Rico, silver for Puerto Rico, and bronze for Barbados, octathlon boys (U-17): gold for the Bahamas, silver for Saint Lucia, and bronze for Mexico. The number of events would increase to 82.

== Participation (unofficial) ==
Haiti competed for the first time at the championships. Detailed result lists can be found on the World Junior Athletics History website. An unofficial count yields a number of about 422 athletes (260 junior (under-20) and 162 youth (under-17)) from about 31 countries, a new record number of participating nations:

- Anguilla (3)
- Antigua and Barbuda (1)
- Aruba (4)
- Bahamas (23)
- Barbados (23)
- Bermuda (6)
- British Virgin Islands (1)
- Cayman Islands (8)
- Colombia (4)
- Costa Rica (2)
- Dominica (1)
- Dominican Republic (11)
- El Salvador (8)
- Grenada (12)
- Guatemala (10)
- Guyana (2)
- Haiti (2)
- Jamaica (70)
- (Mexico) México (42)
- Netherlands Antilles (9)
- Nicaragua (1)
- Panama (8)
- Puerto Rico (88)
- Saint Kitts and Nevis (3)
- Saint Lucia (2)
- Saint Vincent and the Grenadines (2)
- Suriname (2)
- Trinidad and Tobago (40)
- Turks and Caicos Islands (2)
- U.S. Virgin Islands (7)
- Venezuela (25)
