= 1999 CARIFTA Games =

XXVIII CARIFTA Games
- Dates: April 3–5
- Host city: Fort-de-France, Martinique
- Level: Junior and Youth
- Events: 63 (34 junior, 29 youth)
- Participation: about 376 (197 junior, 179 youth) athletes from about 21 nations

The 28th CARIFTA Games was held in Fort-de-France, Martinique, on April 3–5, 1999.

== Participation (unofficial) ==
Detailed result lists can be found on the "World Junior Athletics History" website. An unofficial count yields the number of about 376 athletes (197 junior (under-20) and 179 youth (under-17)) from about 21 countries: Antigua and Barbuda (12), Aruba (4), Bahamas (34), Barbados (39), Bermuda (4), Cayman Islands (15), Dominica (5), French Guiana (4), Grenada (16), Guadeloupe (39), Guyana (3), Jamaica (58), Martinique (61), Netherlands Antilles (4), Saint Kitts and Nevis (7), Saint Lucia (2), Saint Vincent and the Grenadines (9), Suriname (2), Trinidad and Tobago (46), Turks and Caicos Islands (8), US Virgin Islands (4).

== Austin Sealy Award ==
The Austin Sealy Trophy for the most outstanding athlete of the games was awarded to Darrel Brown from Trinidad and Tobago. He won (at least) 2 gold medals (100m, and 200m) in the youth (U-17) category (there is no information on the composition of the relay teams).

== Medal summary ==
Medal winners are published by category: Boys under 20 (Junior), Girls under 20 (Junior), Boys under 17 (Youth), and Girls under 17 (Youth). Complete results can be found on the website of the Fédération française d'athlétisme, and on the "World Junior Athletics History" website.

=== Boys under 20 (Junior) ===
Event	Gold		Silver		Bronze	
100 metres (-0.4 m/s)	Dwight Thomas (JAM)	10.47	Fabrice Calligny (MTQ)	10.50	Omar Brown (JAM)	10.69
200 metres (1.3 m/s)	Dwight Thomas (JAM)	20.79	Omar Brown (JAM)	21.18	Fabrice Calligny (MTQ)	21.18
400 metres	Sanjay Ayre (JAM)	47.10	Sherridan Kirk (TRI)	47.22	Alexis Roberts (BAH)	47.51
800 metres	Napoleon Rolle (BAH)	1:52.77	Aldwyn Sappleton (JAM)	1:52.95	Sherridan Kirk (TRI)	1:53.33
1500 metres	Aldwyn Sappleton (JAM)	4:06.08	Vishwanauth Sukmongal (GUY)	4:07.26	Mashel Jackson (JAM)	4:08.91
5000 metres	Vishwanauth Sukmongal (GUY)	15:28.88	Anton Bruce (TRI)	16:15.13	Roland Bartholomew (TRI)	16:31.15
110 metres hurdles (2.2 m/s)	Marvin Williams (JAM)	14.48w	Jermaine Ricketts (JAM)	14.52w	Didier Richard (MTQ)	15.09w
400 metres hurdles	Ryan Clarke (JAM)	52.57	Dean Griffiths (JAM)	52.89	Ryan Smith (BAR)	54.02
High jump	Naron Stewart (JAM)	2.09	Henderson Dottin (BAR)	2.06	Kevin Cumberbatch (BAR)	2.06
Pole vault	Dwight Shakespeare (JAM)	3.80	Ellis Edwards (TRI)	3.60	Sammanque McDonald (BAH)	3.50
Long jump	Leevan Sands (BAH)	7.54	Marc Marsillon (MTQ)	7.39	Nyles Stuart (BAH)	7.30
Triple jump	Leevan Sands (BAH)	16.02w	Géraud Honoré (MTQ)	15.73	Dave Vainqueur (GLP)	15.60w
Shot put	Patrick Harding (GUY)	14.90	Orville Byfield (JAM)	13.74	Lionel Caster (MTQ)	13.64
Discus throw	Patrick Harding (GUY)	47.24	Jean-François Aurokiom (MTQ)	43.75	Orville Byfield (JAM)	43.38
Javelin throw	Richard Rock (BAR)	62.47	Terry Nurse (BAR)	62.26	Elarius Frank (GRN)	55.90
Heptathlon	Maurice Smith (JAM)	5623				
4 × 100 metres relay	Martinique	41.33	Barbados	41.65	Trinidad and Tobago	41.83
4 × 400 metres relay	Trinidad and Tobago	3:12.01	Jamaica	3:12.26	Barbados	3:14.46

=== Girls under 20 (Junior) ===
Event	Gold		Silver		Bronze	
100 metres (-0.8 m/s)	Aleen Bailey (JAM)	11.60	Fana Ashby (TRI)	11.63	Adrianna Lamalle (MTQ)	11.80
200 metres (1.6 m/s)	Aleen Bailey (JAM)	23.39	Fana Ashby (TRI)	23.58	Veronica Campbell (JAM)	23.84
400 metres	Keisha Downer (JAM)	53.78	Patricia Hall (JAM)	54.43	Keisha Esprit (BAR)	55.06
800 metres	Karen Gayle (JAM)	2:11.32	Janelle Inniss (BAR)	2:11.60	Sheena Gooding (BAR)	2:11.63
1500 metres	Judith Patterson (JAM)	4:43.71	Judith Thomas (JAM)	4:46.72	Stacey Quashie (ATG)	4:57.52
3000 metres	Judith Thomas (JAM)	10:13.34	Pilar McShine (TRI)	11:18.94	Rhonda DesVignes (TRI)	11:21.19
100 metres hurdles (2.1 m/s)	Adrianna Lamalle (MTQ)	13.43w	Keitha Moseley (BAR)	13.89w	Alicia Cave (TRI)	13.89w
400 metres hurdles	Patricia Hall (JAM)	58.78	Alicia Cave (TRI)	59.40	Séverine Costier (MTQ)	59.73
High jump	Shelly-Ann Gallimore (JAM)	1.75	Camille Robinson (JAM)	1.70	Onika James (TRI)	1.70
Long jump	Shelly-Ann Gallimore (JAM)	5.81	Stéphanie Luzieux (MTQ)	5.77	Juanita Ferguson (BAH)	5.65
Triple jump	Shelly-Ann Gallimore (JAM)	13.22	Christelle Quisoir (GLP)	12.85	Aurélie Talbot (GLP)	12.80
Shot put	Candice Scott (TRI)	14.09	Sandrine André (GUY)	12.25	Kamesha Marshall (JAM)	12.11
Discus throw	Séphora Bissoly (MTQ)	36.43	Candice Scott (TRI)	34.50	Kamesha Marshall (JAM)	34.26
Javelin throw	Séphora Bissoly (MTQ)	47.88	Rolanda Williams (GRN)	43.10	Anna-Lee Walcott (TRI)	42.69
4 × 100 metres relay	Martinique	45.60	Bahamas	45.65	Guadeloupe	46.16
4 × 400 metres relay	Jamaica	3:41.12	Trinidad and Tobago	3:45.28	Barbados	3:50.08

=== Boys under 17 (Youth) ===
Event	Gold		Silver		Bronze	
100 metres (-0.8 m/s)	Darrel Brown (TRI)	10.67	Leron Johnson (TRI)	10.90	Robert Ibeh (CAY)	11.08
200 metres (1.9 m/s)	Darrel Brown (TRI)	21.20	Wilan Louis (BAR)	21.81	Xavier Guillaume (GLP)	22.00
400 metres	Wilan Louis (BAR)	48.27	Sekou Clarke (JAM)	49.24	Kevin Straker (TRI)	49.77
800 metres	Mathias Castingo (GLP)	1:57.44	Richard Walcott (BER)	1:59.39	Pascal Hans (GLP)	1:59.41
1500 metres	Mathias Castingo (GLP)	4:07.07	Kern Harripersad (TRI)	4:14.64	Marvin Pinnock (JAM)	4:14.68
5000 metres	Kendell Simon (GRN)	16:11.01				
100 metres hurdles (1.5 m/s)	Dwayne Robinson (JAM)	13.29	Rossif McCollin (BAR)	13.62	Robert Ibeh (CAY)	13.90
400 metres hurdles	Ryan Nurse (BAR)	55.33	Greg Little (JAM)	56.23	Daniel Greaves (TRI)	57.29
High jump	Germaine Mason (JAM)	2.03	Damon Thompson (BAR)	1.95	Cédric Clerembeau (GLP)	1.90
Long jump	Leron Johnson (TRI)	6.87	Sedain McDonald (JAM)	6.58	Robert Ibeh (CAY)	6.55
Triple jump	Daniel Mayaud (MTQ)	13.84	Giovanni Rolle (BAH)	13.78	Fabian Florant (DMA)	13.54
Shot put	Shamir Thomas (GRN)	14.37	Lionel Marie-Magdeleine (MTQ)	14.21	Dwayne Robinson (JAM)	14.00
Discus throw	Shamir Thomas (GRN)	47.79	Basillos Salkey (JAM)	44.94	Michael Letterlough (CAY)	40.55
Javelin throw	Densley Joseph (GRN)	57.01	Mickaël Bonus (GLP)	55.98	Lionel Marie-Magdeleine (MTQ)	53.43
4 × 100 metres relay	Trinidad and Tobago	42.10	Bahamas	42.66	Jamaica	42.80

=== Girls under 17 (Youth) ===
Event	Gold		Silver		Bronze	
100 metres (-1.7 m/s)	Lisa Sharpe (JAM)	11.82	Rodneshya Pitts (ISV)	12.25	Nadine Palmer (JAM)	12.33
200 metres (1.7 m/s)	Melaine Walker (JAM)	23.51	Lisa Sharpe (JAM)	23.56	Tiandra Ponteen (SKN)	24.26
400 metres	Shanna Kay Campbell (JAM)	54.30	Kishara George (GRN)	54.88	Tiandra Ponteen (SKN)	54.89
800 metres	Nerissa Pelle (ATG)	2:16.33	Daniella Abraham (GRN)	2:16.87	Althea Chambers (JAM)	2:17.04
1500 metres	Janill Williams (ATG)	4:36.87	Daniella Abraham (GRN)	4:44.97	Nicola Maye (JAM)	4:45.21
3000 metres	Janill Williams (ATG)	10:00.23	Daniella Abraham (GRN)	10:12.66	Stephanie Ferguson (GRN)	10:15.88
100 metres hurdles (2.0 m/s)	Melaine Walker (JAM)	13.51	Véronique Marie-Joseph (MTQ)	14.08	Schwannah McCarthy (CAY)	14.13
300 metres hurdles	Veronia Patterson (JAM)	43.34	Romona Modeste (TRI)	43.39	Camile Robinson (JAM)	44.01
High jump	Sheree Francis (JAM)	1.80	Desiree Crichlow (BAR)	1.77	Mirium Roberts (DMA)	1.60
Long jump	Sheree Francis (JAM)	5.99	Amandine Resin (MTQ)	5.76	Charisse Bacchus (TRI)	5.58
Shot put	Claudia Villeneuve (MTQ)	14.29*	Marie-Patrice Calabre (GLP)	12.50*	Laura Amory (MTQ)	12.41*
Discus throw	Claudia Villeneuve (MTQ)	41.13	Shernelle Nicholls (BAR)	39.39	Atiba Robinson (TRI)	31.80
Javelin throw	Jade Bailey (BAR)	33.53	Marie-Patrice Calabre (GLP)	32.42	Kesheila Reid (JAM)	31.06
4 × 100 metres relay	Jamaica	45.16	Martinique	47.01	Bahamas	47.89

== Medal table (unofficial) ==
* Host nation (Martinique)

Rank	Nation	Gold	Silver	Bronze	Total
1	Jamaica (JAM)	30	14	14	58
2	Martinique (MTQ)*	8	9	7	24
3	Trinidad and Tobago (TTO)	6	12	11	29
4	Barbados (BAR)	4	10	6	20
5	Grenada (GRN)	4	5	2	11
6	Bahamas (BAH)	3	3	5	11
7	Guyana (GUY)	3	2	0	5
8	Antigua and Barbuda (ATG)	3	0	1	4
9	Guadeloupe (GLP)	2	4	6	12
10	Bermuda (BER)	0	1	0	1
10	U.S. Virgin Islands (VIR)	0	1	0	1
12	Cayman Islands (CAY)	0	0	5	5
13	Dominica (DMA)	0	0	2	2
13	Saint Kitts and Nevis (SKN)	0	0	2	2
Totals (14 entries)		63	61	61	185
