= 2000 CARIFTA Games =

XXIX CARIFTA Games
- Dates: April 22–24
- Host city: St. George's, Grenada
- Venue: Grenada National Stadium
- Level: Junior and Youth
- Events: 61 (34 junior, 27 youth)
- Participation: about 265 (154 junior, 111 youth) athletes from about 21 nations
- Records set: 12 championships records

The 29th CARIFTA Games was held at the National Stadium in St. George's, Grenada on April 22–24, 2000. A detailed report on the results was given.

== Participation (unofficial) ==
Detailed result lists can be found on the "St. Lucia online" and on the "World Junior Athletics History" website. An unofficial count yields the number of about 265 athletes (154 junior (under-20) and 111 youth (under-17)) from about 21 countries: Anguilla (5), Antigua and Barbuda (7), Bahamas (27), Barbados (23), Belize (1), Bermuda (9), British Virgin Islands (2), Cayman Islands (7), Dominica (3), Grenada (33), Guadeloupe (12), Guyana (2), Jamaica (55), Martinique (35), Netherlands Antilles (1), Saint Kitts and Nevis (2), Saint Lucia (1), Saint Vincent and the Grenadines (2), Trinidad and Tobago (35), Turks and Caicos Islands (1), and the US Virgin Islands (2).

== Records ==
A total of 12 championships records were set.

In the boys' U-20 category, Dwayne Henclewood from Jamaica threw the discus 50.41 m.

In the girls' U-20 category, Veronica Campbell from Jamaica finished the 200 metres in 23.05 seconds. Sheree Francis from Jamaica equalled the 1.79 m jumped by Nicola Springer, Barbados, in high jump in the year 1987. Claudia Villeneuve from Martinique set new records in shot put (15.29 m) and discus throw (50.14 m). Keitha Moseley from Barbados achieved 3,695 points in heptathlon. Moreover, Adrianna Lamalle from Martinique reached 13.64 s in the 100 metres hurdles event.

In the boys' U-17 category, the star of the games, Darrel Brown from Trinidad and Tobago, set two new records of 10.36 s in 100 metres and 21.20 s in 200 metres, and (most probably) helped the Trinidad and Tobago 4 × 100 metres relay team to finish in 40.87 s. 16.07 metres is the new shot put record for Kimani Kirton from Jamaica.

Finally, in the girls' U-20 category, Janill Williams from Antigua and Barbuda won the 1,500 metres in the new championships record time of 4:32.89.

== Austin Sealy Award ==
The Austin Sealy Trophy for the most outstanding athlete of the games was awarded for the second time in the role to Darrel Brown from Trinidad and Tobago. He won (at least) 2 gold medals (100m, and 200m) in the youth (U-17) category (there is no information on the composition of the Trinidad and Tobago relay teams).

== Medal summary ==
Medal winners are published by category: Boys under 20 (Junior), Girls under 20 (Junior), Boys under 17 (Youth), and Girls under 17 (Youth). Complete results can be found on the "St. Lucia online", and on the "World Junior Athletics History" website.

=== Boys under 20 (Junior) ===
Event	Gold		Silver		Bronze	
100 metres (0.6 m/s)	Omar Brown (JAM)	10.39	Paul Thompson (JAM)	10.54	Sean Lambert (GRN)	10.61
200 metres (0.9 m/s)	Omar Brown (JAM)	21.06	Winston Smith (JAM)	21.19	Fabrice Calligny (MTQ)	21.46
400 metres	Damion Barry (TRI)	46.63	Pete Coley (JAM)	46.73	Alexis Roberts (BAH)	46.95
800 metres	Aldwyn Sappleton (JAM)	1:52.70	Alexis Roberts (BAH)	1:52.77	Mathias Castingo (GLP)	1:54.08
1500 metres	André Crawford (JAM)	4:00.07	Vishwanauth Sukmongal (GUY)	4:00.79	Mathias Castingo (GLP)	4:00.91
5000 metres	Vishwanauth Sukmongal (GUY)	15:22.83	Kendell Simon (GRN)	15:53.05	André Crawford (JAM)	16:07.44
110 metres hurdles (1.8 m/s)	Dwayne Robinson (JAM)	14.63	Rossif McCollin (BAR)	15.04	Douglas Lynes-Bell (BAH)	16.09
400 metres hurdles	Ryan Smith (BAR)	53.25	Dwight Mighty (JAM)	53.45	Greg Little (JAM)	54.56
High jump	Germaine Mason (JAM)	2.12	Romel Lightbourne (BAH); Damon Thompson (BAR)	2.12		
Pole vault	Ellis Edwards (TRI)	3.60	Kenneth Goodridge (TRI)	3.55	Dwight Shakespeare (JAM)	3.55
Long jump	Leevan Sands (BAH)	7.68	Cleavon Dillon (TRI)	7.45	Paul Thompson (JAM)	7.36
Triple jump	Leevan Sands (BAH)	16.14w	Sylvain Keetter (GLP)	15.29w	Daniel Mayaud (MTQ)	15.23
Shot put	Dwayne Henclewood (JAM)	13.90	Shamir Thomas (GRN)	13.88	Lionel Caster (MTQ)	13.86
Discus throw	Dwayne Henclewood (JAM)	50.41 CR	Jean-François Aurokiom (MTQ)	48.44	Shamir Thomas (GRN)	46.18
Javelin throw	Alroy Peters (GRN)	59.55	Keron Francis (GRN)	59.35	Solomon John (TRI)	58.42
Heptathlon	Alan Mitchell (TRI)	4621	Sherwin Merryman (GRN)	4531	Samuel Payne (BAR)	4370
4 × 100 metres relay	Jamaica; Paul Thompson Winston Smith; Omar Brown	40.55	Martinique	41.31	Barbados	41.56
4 × 400 metres relay	Trinidad and Tobago	3:12.73	Bahamas	3:13.76	Barbados	3:14.58

: Open event for both junior and youth athletes.

=== Girls under 20 (Junior) ===
Event	Gold		Silver		Bronze	
100 metres	Nadine Palmer (JAM)	11.37	Veronica Campbell (JAM)	11.41	Gladys Bellard (MTQ)	11.74
200 metres (1.2 m/s)	Veronica Campbell (JAM)	23.05 CR	Nadine Palmer (JAM)	23.44	Fana Ashby (TRI)	23.86
400 metres	Hazel-Ann Regis (GRN)	53.29	Sheryl Morgan (JAM)	53.66	Shellene Williams (JAM)	54.15
800 metres	Karen Gayle (JAM)	2:08.73	Sheena Gooding (BAR)	2:09.25	Tanice Barnett (JAM)	2:11.97
1500 metres	Tanice Barnett (JAM)	4:36.15	Nicola Maye (JAM)	4:41.99	Nerissa Pelle (ATG)	4:46.70
3000 metres	Janill Williams (ATG)	9:57.33	Mellecia Pilache (JAM)	10:11.50	Pilar McShine (TRI)	10:14.73
100 metres hurdles (1.6 m/s)	Adrianna Lamalle (MTQ)	13.57	Keitha Moseley (BAR)	13.60	Toni Ann D'Oyley (JAM)	13.78
400 metres hurdles	Alicia Cave (TRI)	58.92	Patricia Hall (JAM)	60.00	Romona Modeste (TRI)	60.58
High jump	Sheree Francis (JAM)	1.79 =CR	Onika James (TRI)	1.70	Toni Ann D'Oyley (JAM)	1.70
Long jump	Aurélie Talbot (GLP)	5.95	Séverine Costier (MTQ)	5.93	Onika James (TRI)	5.85
Triple jump	Authea Chambers (JAM)	12.95	Aurélie Talbot (GLP)	12.92	Stéphanie Luzieux (MTQ)	12.66
Shot put	Claudia Villeneuve (MTQ)	15.29 CR	Laura Amory (MTQ)	13.43	Kamesha Marshall (JAM)	12.83
Discus throw	Claudia Villeneuve (MTQ)	50.14 CR	Chafree Bain (BAH)	43.22	Kamesha Marshall (JAM)	41.71
Javelin throw	Séphora Bissoly (MTQ)	47.87	Bassie Mitchell (GRN)	41.85	Rolanda Williams (GRN)	40.61
Pentathlon	Keitha Moseley (BAR)	3695 CR	Althea Akeins (JAM)	3346	Lauren Maul (BAR)	3280
4 × 100 metres relay	Jamaica	44.63	Trinidad and Tobago	45.31	Martinique	45.31
4 × 400 metres relay	Jamaica	3:35.33	Barbados	3:42.13	Trinidad and Tobago	3:43.46

: Open event for both junior and youth athletes.

=== Boys under 17 (Youth) ===
Event	Gold		Silver		Bronze	
100 metres (1.5 m/s)	Darrel Brown (TRI)	10.36 CR	Churandy Martina (AHO)	10.73	Grafton Ifill (BAH)	10.75
200 metres (1.7 m/s)	Darrel Brown (TRI)	21.20 CR	Churandy Martina (AHO)	21.73	Grafton Ifill (BAH)	21.81
400 metres	Melville Rogers (SKN)	49.40	Kellon Francis (TRI)	49.54	Kevin Straker (TRI)	49.63
800 metres	Kern Harripersad (TRI)	1:57.39	Joel Pile (TRI)	1:57.45	Dwayne Higgins (JAM)	1:57.70
1500 metres	Kern Harripersad (TRI)	4:10.49	Trevon Baptiste (GRN)	4:11.85	Olivier Emboule (GLP)	4:12.60
100 metres hurdles (1.8 m/s)	Johan Privat (MTQ)	13.36	Patrick Lee (JAM)	13.47	Brian Hay (JAM)	13.48
400 metres hurdles	Patrick Lee (JAM)	53.62	Kemar Smith (JAM)	53.85	Damien Broomes (BAR)	55.56
High jump	Cédric Clerembeau (GLP)	2.00	Adrian Cephas (JAM)	1.95	Jamal Cumberbatch (BAR)	1.90
Long jump	Leon George (GRN)	7.15	Kimani Williams (JAM)	7.10	Eddy De Lépine (MTQ)	6.99
Triple jump	Eddy De Lépine (MTQ)	14.55	Adrian Cephas (JAM)	14.05	Cédric Bergoz (MTQ)	13.95
Shot put	Kimani Kirton (JAM)	16.07 CR	Fabian Morgan (JAM)	14.58	Walt Williams (GRN)	13.55
Discus throw	Kimani Kirton (JAM)	42.86	Michael Letterlough (CAY)	40.57	Eric Mathias (IVB)	40.52
Javelin throw	Densley Joseph (GRN)	58.40	Jamal Forde (BAR)	53.78	Kareem Stoute (BAR)	52.12
4 × 100 metres relay	Trinidad and Tobago	40.87 CR	Martinique	42.10	Jamaica	42.53

=== Girls under 17 (Youth) ===
Event	Gold		Silver		Bronze	
100 metres (1.5 m/s)	Kerron Stewart (JAM)	11.95	Utica Edgecombe (BAH)	12.05	Kenisha Joseph (GRN)	12.09
200 metres (2.5 m/s)	Lisa Sharpe (JAM)	23.31w	Simone Facey (JAM)	24.32w	Utica Edgecombe (BAH)	24.49w
400 metres	Anneisha McLaughlin (JAM)	54.57	Kashain Page (JAM)	55.54	Tavara Rigby (BAH)	56.17
800 metres	Carlene Robinson (JAM)	2:10.76	Kayann Thompson (JAM)	2:12.46	Janill Williams (ATG)	2:13.13
1500 metres	Janill Williams (ATG)	4:32.89 CR	Stephanie Ferguson (GRN)	4:43.32	Cadien Beckford (JAM)	4:46.46
100 metres hurdles (0.3 m/s)	Nadina Marsh (JAM)	14.30	Géraldine Lecefel (MTQ)	14.41	Charisse Bacchus (TRI)	14.59
300 metres hurdles	Camile Robinson (JAM)	43.02	Charisse Bacchus (TRI)	43.32	Kerron Stewart (JAM)	43.41
High jump	Shaunette Davidson (JAM)	1.76	Desiree Crichlow (BAR)	1.76	Levern Spencer (LCA)	1.73
Long jump	Elysée Vesanes (FRA)	6.00	Charisse Bacchus (TRI)	5.88	Euzhan Varlin (MTQ)	5.82w
Shot put	Shernelle Nicholls (BAR)	13.03	Brittney Marshall (BER)	11.22	Sheena McIntosh (GRN)	10.70
Discus throw	Shernelle Nicholls (BAR)	39.75	Monique Edwards (JAM)	34.81	Sandrena Small (BAR)	34.16
Javelin throw	Nathalia Vincent (GRN)	37.43	Shernelle Nicholls (BAR)	33.95	Shakarah Kemp (BAH)	30.10
4 × 100 metres relay	Jamaica	45.91	Guadeloupe	46.95	Trinidad and Tobago	47.32

== Medal table (unofficial) ==
* Host nation (Grenada)

Rank	Nation	Gold	Silver	Bronze	Total
1	Jamaica (JAM)	28	21	15	64
2	Trinidad and Tobago (TTO)	10	8	9	27
3	Martinique (MTQ)	6	6	9	21
4	Grenada (GRN)*	5	7	6	18
5	Barbados (BAR)	4	8	8	20
6	Bahamas (BAH)	2	5	7	14
7	Guadeloupe (GLP)	2	4	3	9
8	Antigua and Barbuda (ATG)	2	0	2	4
9	Guyana (GUY)	1	1	0	2
10	Saint Kitts and Nevis (SKN)	1	0	0	1
11	Netherlands Antilles (AHO)	0	2	0	2
12	Bermuda (BER)	0	1	0	1
12	Cayman Islands (CAY)	0	1	0	1
14	British Virgin Islands (IVB)	0	0	1	1
14	Saint Lucia (LCA)	0	0	1	1
Totals (15 entries)		61	64	61	186
