= 1998 CARIFTA Games =

XXVII CARIFTA Games
- Dates: April 11–13
- Host city: Port of Spain, Trinidad and Tobago
- Level: Junior and Youth
- Events: 62
- Participation: about 308 athletes from about 20 nations

The 27th CARIFTA Games was held in Port of Spain, Trinidad and Tobago, on April 11–13, 1998.

== Participation (unofficial) ==
Detailed result lists can be found on the "World Junior Athletics History" website. An unofficial count yields the number of about 308 athletes (176 junior (under-20) and 132 youth (under-17)) from about 20 countries: Antigua and Barbuda (10), Bahamas (34), Barbados (41), Bermuda (7), British Virgin Islands (3), Cayman Islands (9), Dominica (4), French Guiana (3), Grenada (11), Guadeloupe (19), Guyana (7), Jamaica (59), Martinique (24), Montserrat (1), Netherlands Antilles (5), Saint Kitts and Nevis (4), Saint Lucia (5), Saint Vincent and the Grenadines (6), Trinidad and Tobago (52), Turks and Caicos Islands (4).

== Austin Sealy Award ==
The Austin Sealy Trophy for the most outstanding athlete of the games was awarded to Janill Williams from Antigua and Barbuda. She was born on September 21, 1985. At the age of 11 years, she already won the gold medal in the women's 3000 metres competition last year in the junior (U-20) category at the 1997 CARIFTA Games being the youngest athlete to win a medal at the games. This year at the age of 12 years, she won 2 gold medals, again the 3000 metres in the junior (U-20) category, and the 1500 metres in the youth (U-17) category.

== Medal summary ==
Medal winners are published by category: Boys under 20 (Junior), Girls under 20 (Junior), Boys under 17 (Youth), and Girls under 17 (Youth). Complete results can be found on the "World Junior Athletics History" website.

=== Boys under 20 (Junior) ===
Event	Gold		Silver		Bronze	
100 metres	Dwight Thomas (JAM)	10.46	Dimitri Demonière (MTQ)	10.52	Jermaine Esprit (AHO)	10.66
200 metres (0.0 m/s)	Steve Slowly (JAM)	21.04	Cédric Gold-Dalg (MTQ)	21.24	Dimitri Demonière (MTQ)	21.36
400 metres	Simon Pierre (TRI)	46.92	Lueroy Colquhoun (JAM)	46.58	Omar Henry (JAM)	47.38
800 metres	Marlon Greensword (JAM)	1:50.58	Sherridan Kirk (TRI)	1:51.81	Aldwyn Sappleton (JAM)	1:51.83
1500 metres	Aldwyn Sappleton (JAM)	3:58.88	Marlon Greensword (JAM)	4:00.81	Kevin Louison (TRI)	4:01.25
5000 metres	Vishwanauth Sukmongal (GUY)	15:41.49	Matthew Debrilla (TRI)	15:48.65	Anton Bruce (TRI)	15:55.51
110 metres hurdles (-3.0 m/s)	Dwight Thomas (JAM)	14.53	Quayne Baccas (JAM)	14.85	Hugh Henry (BAR)	15.07
400 metres hurdles	Ryan Clarke (JAM)	51.58	David Lloyd (JAM)	51.77	Hugh Henry (BAR)	54.04
High jump	Kevin Cumberbatch (BAR)	2.09	Fabrice Erepmoc (MTQ)	2.06	Anwar Ferguson (BAH)	2.03
Pole vault	Jabari Ennis (JAM)	4.32	Dion Kong (TRI)	3.45	Micky Ruben (TRI)	2.75
Long jump	Paul Thompson (JAM)	7.52	Stéphane Moreau (MTQ)	7.50	Leevan Sands (BAH)	7.42
Triple jump	Sébastien Pincemail (GLP)	15.94	Stéphane Saxemard (MTQ)	15.28	Leevan Sands (BAH)	15.01
Shot put	Patrick Harding (GUY)	14.55	Claston Bernard (JAM)	14.19	Rohan Ferguson (JAM)	13.39
Discus throw	David Bissoly (MTQ)	46.74	Rohan Ferguson (JAM)	43.45	Orville Byfield (JAM)	42.35
Javelin throw	Richard Rock (BAR)	59.41	Terry Nurse (BAR)	58.29	Mike Modeste (GRN)	57.62
Heptathlon	Micky Ruben (TRI)	4678	Levard Missick (TCA)	4670	Andrew Swanston (TRI)	4381
4 × 100 metres relay	Jamaica	40.03	Martinique	40.43	Trinidad and Tobago	41.35
4 × 400 metres relay	Jamaica	3:11.49	Barbados	3:13.40	Bahamas	3:20.85

=== Girls under 20 (Junior) ===
Event	Gold		Silver		Bronze	
100 metres	Aleen Bailey (JAM)	11.37	Elva Goulbourne (JAM)	11.62	Fana Ashby (TRI)	11.63
200 metres (2.4 m/s)	Aleen Bailey (JAM)	23.16w	Elva Goulbourne (JAM)	23.32w	Fana Ashby (TRI)	23.74w
400 metres	Keisha Downer (JAM)	52.57	Hazel-Ann Regis (GRN)	52.83	Allison Beckford (JAM)	53.93
800 metres	Melissa de Leon (TRI)	2:06.83	Janelle Inniss (BAR)	2:11.33	Aileen Smith (JAM)	2:11.53
1500 metres	Aileen Smith (JAM)	4:39.48	Anisha Humes (TRI)	4:41.06	Abidemi Charles (GUY)	4:45.71
3000 metres	Janill Williams (ATG)	10:09.05	Daniella Abraham (GRN)	10:20.13	Stacey Quashie (ATG)	10:24.54
100 metres hurdles (-3.5 m/s)	Natalie Dawkins (JAM)	14.47	Makeda Prime (TRI)	14.52	Brigitte Ladouceur (GUF)	14.53
400 metres hurdles	Allison Beckford (JAM)	59.38	Andrea Bliss (JAM)	59.90	Séverine Costier (MTQ)	63.06
High jump	Kelsie Johnson (BAH)	1.76	Shelly-Ann Gallimore (JAM)	1.76	Onika James (TRI)	1.70
Long jump	Marie-Hélène Carabin (GLP)	6.27	Kelsie Johnson (BAH)	6.11	Elva Goulbourne (JAM)	6.08
Triple jump	Aurélie Talbot (GLP)	13.04	Shelly-Ann Gallimore (JAM)	12.86	Christine Brown (JAM)	12.79
Shot put	Candice Scott (TRI)	13.17	Sandrine André (GUY)	12.73	Shanell Andrews (BAH)	12.20
Discus throw	Béatrice Louisy-Louis (MTQ)	45.41	Tanya Thomas (JAM)	44.56	Evia Morrison (BAH)	39.51
Javelin throw	Marie-Christine Lincertin (GLP)	45.27	Murielle Lambert (GLP)	44.96	Francette Pognon (MTQ)	44.62
Pentathlon	Keisha Harvey (JAM)	3381	Chanelle Maxwell (BAR)	2990	Anna-Lee Walcott (TRI)	2959
4 × 100 metres relay	Jamaica	44.97	Trinidad and Tobago	46.16	Bahamas	46.52
4 × 400 metres relay	Jamaica	3:33.19	Trinidad and Tobago	3:38.01	Guadeloupe	3:40.23

=== Boys under 17 (Youth) ===
Event	Gold		Silver		Bronze	
100 metres (-0.7 m/s)	Marc Burns (TRI)	10.76	Nicholas Dennisser (JAM)	10.79	Michael Frater (JAM)	10.85
200 metres (0.0 m/s)	Marc Burns (TRI)	21.69	Omar Brown (JAM)	21.71	David Hamil (CAY)	21.74
400 metres	Wilan Louis (BAR)	48.35	Damion Barry (TRI)	48.44	Jason Hunte (BAR)	49.02
800 metres	Kenrick Ferrill (JAM)	1:58.14	Jameel Wilson (TRI)	1:58.28	Dwight McCaulsky (JAM)	1:58.32
1500 metres	Kenrick Ferrill (JAM)	4:09.56	Dwight McCaulsky (JAM)	4:11.43	Dwayne Lindsay (ATG)	4:12.15
100 metres hurdles (4.5 m/s)	Ricardo Melbourne (JAM)	13.39w	Rossif McCollin (BAR)	13.77w	Jefferson Quintyne (BAR)	14.08w
400 metres hurdles	Ricardo Melbourne (JAM)	52.97	Jason Hunte (BAR)	55.29	Brent Harry (TRI)	55.68
High jump	Naron Stewart (JAM)	2.00	Christopher Morrison (JAM)	2.00	Damon Thompson (BAR)	1.95
Long jump	Dwayne Greenidge (BAR)	7.31	Stéphane Scholent (MTQ)	7.03	Dwayne Robinson (JAM)	7.03
Triple jump	Dwayne Greenidge (BAR)	14.53	Kevin Holmes (JAM)	13.77	Samuel Payne (BAR)	13.73
Shot put	Shamir Thomas (GRN)	14.66	Godfrey Ellis (BAH)	14.08	Nikeo Watson (BAH)	14.03
Discus throw	Godfrey Ellis (BAH)	43.43	Shamir Thomas (GRN)	42.36	Dwayne DaCosta (JAM)	41.18
Javelin throw	Shane Brandford (BAR)	51.75	Charly Catalan (GLP)	51.12	Keron Francis (GRN)	49.98
4 × 100 metres relay	Trinidad and Tobago	41.58	Jamaica	41.79	Bahamas	42.51

=== Girls under 17 (Youth) ===
Event	Gold		Silver		Bronze	
100 metres	Raneika Bean (BER)	11.96	Melaine Walker (JAM)	12.03	Lisa Sharpe (JAM)	12.04
200 metres	Melaine Walker (JAM)	23.91	Lisa Sharpe (JAM)	24.11	Alicia Cave (TRI)	24.21
400 metres	Patricia Hall (JAM)	53.79	Yanique Chambers (JAM)	53.81	Kishara George (GRN)	54.80
800 metres	Althea Chambers (JAM)	2:15.31	Letitia Gilkes (BAR)	2:15.97	Ria McPherson (TRI)	2:16.29
1500 metres	Janill Williams (ATG)	4:34.80	Stacey Quashie (ATG)	4:36.22	Judith Thomas (JAM)	4:43.58
100 metres hurdles (0.9 m/s)	Adrianna Lamalle (MTQ)	13.63	Alicia Cave (TRI)	13.89	Melaine Walker (JAM)	14.15
300 metres hurdles	Patricia Hall (JAM)	41.33	Alicia Cave (TRI)	41.86	Veronia Patterson (JAM)	43.20
High jump	Sheree Francis (JAM)	1.75	Desiree Crichlow (BAR)	1.75	Chanua Johnson (TRI)	1.63
Long jump	Rose Ann Hamilton (JAM)	5.81	Shandria Brown (BAH)	5.61	Sheree Francis (JAM)	5.59
Shot put	Claudia Villeneuve (MTQ)	11.84	Shernelle Nicholls (BAR)	11.79	Marie-Patrice Calabre (GLP)	11.70
Discus throw	Claudia Villeneuve (MTQ)	37.95	Shernelle Nicholls (BAR)	35.81	Bernadette Welds (CAY)	32.31
Javelin throw	Nikkisha Maynard (BAR)	36.92	Jade Bailey (BAR)	36.60	Marie-Patrice Calabre (GLP)	35.09
4 × 100 metres relay	Jamaica	46.55	Trinidad and Tobago	47.27	Bahamas	47.88

== Medal table (unofficial) ==
* Host nation (Trinidad and Tobago)

Rank	Nation	Gold	Silver	Bronze	Total
1	Jamaica (JAM)	31	21	17	69
2	Trinidad and Tobago (TTO)*	7	12	13	32
3	Barbados (BAR)	7	11	6	24
4	Martinique (MTQ)	5	7	3	15
5	Guadeloupe (GLP)	4	2	3	9
6	Bahamas (BAH)	2	3	10	15
7	Antigua and Barbuda (ATG)	2	1	2	5
8	Guyana (GUY)	2	1	1	4
9	Grenada (GRN)	1	3	3	7
10	Bermuda (BER)	1	0	0	1
11	Turks and Caicos Islands (TKS)	0	1	0	1
12	Cayman Islands (CAY)	0	0	2	2
13	French Guiana (GUF)	0	0	1	1
13	Netherlands Antilles (AHO)	0	0	1	1
Totals (14 entries)		62	62	62	186
