= Tracy-Ann Rowe =

Jamaican sprinter

Personal information
- Born: 17 September 1985 (age 41) Manchester, Jamaica

Sport
- Sport: Track and field
Medal record
Athletics
Representing Jamaica
Pan American Games
Gold medal – first place	2007 Rio de Janeiro	4×100 m relay
CAC Junior Championships (U20)
Gold medal – first place	2004 Coatzacoalcos	4×100 m relay
CARIFTA Games Junior (U20)
Gold medal – first place	2004 Hamilton	4×100 m relay
Silver medal – second place	2002 Nassau	200 m
CARIFTA Games Youth (U17)
Gold medal – first place	2001 Bridgetown	4×100m relay
Bronze medal – third place	2001 Bridgetown	100m
Bronze medal – third place	2001 Bridgetown	200m

Tracy-Ann Rowe (born 17 September 1985) is a Jamaican track and field sprinter, who competes in the 100 metres and 200 metres.

== Career ==
Her personal best time in the women's 100 m is 11.25, set on 6 June 2007 in Sacramento, California. She won a gold medal in the women's 4×100 metres relay at the 2007 Pan American Games, alongside Sheri-Ann Brooks, Peta-Gaye Gayle, and Aleen Bailey.

== Achievements ==
Year	Competition	Venue	Position	Event	Notes
Representing Jamaica
2001	CARIFTA Games (U17)	Bridgetown, Barbados	1st	4 × 100 m relay	45.44 s
2001	CARIFTA Games (U17)	Bridgetown, Barbados	3rd	100 m	12.08s (0.0 m/s)
2001	CARIFTA Games (U17)	Bridgetown, Barbados	3rd	200 m	24.87s (-4.0 m/s)
2002	CARIFTA Games (U20)	Nassau, Bahamas	2nd	200 m	23.98 (-1.5 m/s)
2004	CARIFTA Games (U20)	Hamilton, Bermuda	1st	4 × 100 m relay	45.22 s
2004	Central American and Caribbean Junior Championships (U-20)	Coatzacoalcos, Mexico	6th	100 m	11.87 (0.6 m/s)
2004	Central American and Caribbean Junior Championships (U-20)	Coatzacoalcos, Mexico	1st	4 × 100 m relay	44.85
2004	World Junior Championships	Grosseto, Italy	2nd	4 × 100 m relay	43.63 s
2007	Pan American Games	Rio de Janeiro, Brazil	1st	4 × 100 m relay	43.58 s
