= Adrianna Lamalle =

French hurdler (born 1982)

Personal information
- Born: 27 September 1982 (age 43)
Medal record
Women's athletics
Representing France
Mediterranean Games
Silver medal – second place	2005 Almería	100m Hurdles
Representing Guadeloupe
CARIFTA Games Junior (U20)
Gold medal – first place	1999 Fort-de-France	100 m hurdles
Gold medal – first place	2000 St. George's	100 m hurdles
Gold medal – first place	2001 Bridgetown	100 m hurdles
Bronze medal – third place	1999 Fort-de-France	100 m
CARIFTA Games Youth (U17)
Gold medal – first place	1998 Port of Spain	100 m hurdles

Adrianna Lamalle (born 27 September 1982) is a French hurdler born in Les Abymes, Guadeloupe.

She finished 8th in the 100m hurdles final at the 2006 European Athletics Championships in Gothenburg.

She also won the bronze medal in the same event at the 2000 World Junior Championships running 13.27 seconds.

Adriana won the 100m hurdles at the 1st IAAF World Youth Championships in Bydgoszcz, Poland. she ran 13.08 to win, still the best time ever run by an athlete under the age of 18. She also ran 11.66 to finish third in the flat 100.

Her best time in the women's 100 hurdles is 12.67, which she achieved in 2006.

== Prize list ==
=== National ===
- French Outdoor Athletic Champion of 100 m hurdles in 2006 (12.67s) and 2007 (12.94s)
- 3rd at French Athletics Championships of 100 m hurdles in 2005 (12.85s) and 2011 (13.07s)
- 3rd at 60 m hurdles at the 2012 French Indoor Athletics Championships with 8.11s

=== International ===
- Finalist and third relay runner of the 4 × 100 m relay at the 2006 European Championships (alongside Véronique Mang, Fabienne Béret-Martinel and Muriel Hurtis). Team did not finish due to injury in last leg of race.

== Personal Bests ==
- Outdoors :
  - 100 metres : 11 s 49 (+0.0 m/s) at Fort-de-France 17 April 1999
  - 200 metres : 24 s 48 (+0.5 m/s) at Doha 12 May 2006
  - 100 metres hurdles : 12 s 67 (+0.7 m/s) at Tomblaine 22 July 2006
- Indoors :
  - 60 metres : 7 s 59 at Reims 1 February 2008
  - 50 metres hurdles : 6 s 95 at Aubière 25 February 2006
  - 60 metres hurdles : 8 s 02 at Moscow 11 March 2006
