= 2004 CARIFTA Games =

XXXIII CARIFTA Games
- Dates: April 9–11
- Host city: Hamilton, Bermuda
- Venue: National Stadium
- Level: Junior and Youth
- Events: 66 (35 junior (incl. 3 open), 31 youth)
- Participation: about 313 (158 junior, 155 youth) athletes from about 23 nations
- Records set: 1 world junior, 2 games, 7 national

The 33rd CARIFTA Games was held in the National Stadium in Hamilton, Bermuda, on April 9–11, 2004. An appraisal of the results has been given.

== Participation (unofficial) ==
Detailed result lists can be found on the CACAC, the CFPI, the Grenadasports, and the "World Junior Athletics History" website. An unofficial count yields the number of about 313 athletes (158 junior (under-20) and 155 youth (under-17)) from about 23 countries: Anguilla (4), Antigua and Barbuda (6), Aruba (2), Bahamas (61), Barbados (28), Bermuda (22), British Virgin Islands (2), Cayman Islands (10), Dominica (5), Grenada (15), Guadeloupe (18), Guyana (2), Jamaica (67), Martinique (12), Montserrat (1), Netherlands Antilles (2), Saint Kitts and Nevis (3), Saint Lucia (3), Saint Vincent and the Grenadines (3), Suriname (2), Trinidad and Tobago (34), Turks and Caicos Islands (5), US Virgin Islands (6).

== Records ==
Only 2 games records were set. The most prominent result of the games was the new World Junior 200m record set by Usain Bolt of Jamaica to 19.93 seconds! Of course also a new games record was set, and for the first time, the 20 seconds barrier was broken by a junior athlete.

The other games record was set by Jamaican Kimberly Williams in the girls' youth (U-17) triple jump competition achieving 12.53m (-0.6 m/s).

Moreover, a total of seven national records were set by the junior athletes. In the men's category, Ronald Forbes set the 400 metres hurdles record for the Cayman Islands to 53.63 seconds.

In the women's category, Zindzi Swan set two new records in high jump (1.79 m) and long jump (6.05 m (wind: 1.4 m/s)) for Bermuda, Sabina Christmas in javelin throw (43.42 m) for Dominica, Natalia Vincent also in javelin throw (45.56 m) for Grenada, Tressa-Ann Charles in shot put (14.06 m) for Saint Lucia, and Kineke Alexander in 400 metres dash for Saint Vincent and the Grenadines.

== Austin Sealy Award ==
The Austin Sealy Trophy for the most outstanding athlete of the games was awarded for then second time in the role to Usain Bolt of Jamaica. He set the new world junior 200m record, and won 2 further gold medals leading the Jamaican relay teams (4 × 100 m relay, and 4 × 400 m relay) in the junior (U-20) category.

== Medal summary ==
Medal winners are published by category: Boys under 20 (Junior), Girls under 20 (Junior), Boys under 17 (Youth), and Girls under 17 (Youth). Complete results can be found on the CACAC, the CFPI, the Grenadasports, and the "World Junior Athletics History" website.

=== Boys under 20 (Junior) ===
Event	Gold		Silver		Bronze	
100 metres (−0.9 m/s)	Daniel Bailey (ATG)	10.54	Remaldo Rose (JAM)	10.58	Grafton Ifill (BAH)	10.60
200 metres (1.4 m/s)	Usain Bolt (JAM)	19.93 CR	Daniel Bailey (ATG)	21.07	Nesta Carter (JAM)	21.10
400 metres	Josef Robertson (JAM)	46.86	Jamil James (TRI)	47.11	Jacobi Mitchell (BAH)	47.12
800 metres	Simeon Bovell (TRI)	1:52.78	Davian Parker (JAM)	1:55.57	Clayton James (JAM)	1:56.37
1500 metres	Andre Drummond (JAM)	4:05.04	Cleveland Forde (GUY)	4:05.81	Ryan Ross (BAR)	4:08.09
5000 metres	Cleveland Forde (GUY)	15:39.89	Andre Drummond (JAM)	16:10.31	Neilon Joseph (GRN)	16:39.69
110 metres hurdles (0.1 m/s)	Jesse King (BAR)	14.68	Patrick Lee (JAM)	14.69	Adonis Jones (TRI)	15.15
400 metres hurdles	Markino Buckley (JAM)	52.46	Ronald Forbes (CAY)	53.63 NR	Josef Robertson (JAM)	54.99
High jump	Darvin Edwards (LCA)	2.06	Carlos Mattis (JAM); Omar Wright (CAY)	2.00		
Pole vault	Franklyn Anderson (JAM)	4.10	Andrew Brown (BAH)	3.70		
Long jump	Lovintz Tota (BER)	7.68 (1.6 m/s)	Wilbert Walker (JAM)	7.49 w (2.4 m/s)	Alain Bailey (JAM)	7.47 w (3.3 m/s)
Triple jump	Ayata Joseph (ATG)	15.78 w (4.6 m/s)	Wilbert Walker (JAM)	15.69 w (2.2 m/s)	Carlos Mattis (JAM)	15.30 (0.1 m/s)
Shot put	Camoi Hood (JAM)	17.04	Walt Williams (GRN)	16.69	Grégory Gamyr (MTQ)	16.60
Discus throw	Shaun Haughton (JAM)	51.09	David Villeneuve (MTQ)	50.91	Walt Williams (GRN)	49.55
Javelin throw	Ryan Frederick (GRN)	61.50	Carl Morgan (CAY)	59.72	Jonathan Denis (GLP)	56.55
Heptathlon	Wilbert Walker (JAM)	4977 w	Joel Phillip (GRN)	4660 w	Akido Noel (GRN)	4609 w
4 × 100 metres relay	Jamaica; Kevin Stewart; Remaldo Rose; Nesta Carter; Usain Bolt	39.48	Bahamas; Carl Stuart; Grafton Ifill; Jacobi Mitchell; Michael Sands	40.47	Barbados; Krystian Yearwood; Jesse King; Lorenzo Wickham; Ramon Gittens	41.80
4 × 400 metres relay	Jamaica; Markino Buckley; Usain Bolt; Michael Gardener; Josef Robertson	3:12.00	Trinidad and Tobago; Damon Douglas; Renny Quow; Deverne Charles; Jamil James	3:12.65	Bahamas; Andretti Bain; Dominique Rolle; Wilton Martin; Jacobi Mitchell	3:16.37

: Open event for both junior and youth athletes.

=== Girls under 20 (Junior) ===
Event	Gold		Silver		Bronze	
100 metres (-1.7 m/s)	Simone Facey (JAM)	11.72	Jodi-Ann Powell (JAM)	11.86	Kelly Ann Baptiste (TRI)	11.94
200 metres (1.1 m/s)	Nickesha Anderson (JAM)	23.41	Wanda Hutson (TRI)	23.77	Kelly Ann Baptiste (TRI)	23.86
400 metres	Sonita Sutherland (JAM)	53.11	Kineke Alexander (VIN)	53.83 NR	Maris Wisdom (JAM)	53.94
800 metres	Kay-Ann Thompson (JAM)	2:08.38	Vanessa Whittle (JAM)	2:09.05	Sanny Eugene (ISV)	2:18.87
1500 metres	Kay-Ann Thompson (JAM)	4:31.92	Vanessa Whittle (JAM)	4:37.36	Pilar McShine (TRI)	4:41.72
3000 metres	Pilar McShine (TRI)	10:51.41	Lorain McKenzie (JAM)	10:57.09	Chloe Kemp (BER)	11:46.66
100 metres hurdles (-0.3 m/s)	Latoya Greaves (JAM)	13.77	Keisha Brown (JAM)	13.84	Axelle François-Haugrin (MTQ)	14.39
400 metres hurdles	Sherene Pinnock (JAM)	58.98	Trishana McGowan (JAM)	59.83		
High jump	Zindzi Swan (BER)	1.79 NR	Rhonda Watkins (TRI)	1.76	Anna-Kay Campbell (JAM)	1.73
Long jump	Rhonda Watkins (TRI)	6.29 (1.1 m/s)	Zindzi Swan (BER)	6.05 NR (1.4 m/s)	Tamara Francis (JAM)	6.03 (0.9 m/s)
Triple jump	Althea Duncan (JAM)	12.85 (1.9 m/s)	Prescillia Corneille (GLP)	12.84 (2.0 m/s)	Peta-Gaye Beckford (JAM)	12.83 w (2.8 m/s)
Shot put	Aymara Albury (BAH)	14.93	Tressa-Ann Charles (LCA)	14.06 NR	Stella Virolan (GLP)	13.42
Discus throw	Aymara Albury (BAH)	44.30	Valérie Dicot (MTQ)	39.36	Danielle Smith (BAH)	39.15
Javelin throw	Natalia Vincent (GRN)	45.56 NR	Sabina Christmas (DMA)	43.42 NR	Shaneka Parkes (JAM)	42.07
Pentathlon	Nadina Marsh (JAM)	3589	Anna-Kay Campbell (JAM)	3528	Cuquie Melville (TRI)	3329
4 x 100 metres relay	Jamaica; Jodi-Ann Powell; Tracy-Ann Rowe; Nickesha Anderson; Simone Facey	45.22	Trinidad and Tobago; Dianne Cooke; Wanda Hutson; Jurlene Francis; Kelly Ann Baptiste	45.75	Bahamas; Lakeisha Tucker; Tamara Rigby; Tavara Rigby; Tina Ferguson	46.09
4 x 400 metres relay	Jamaica; Maris Wisdom; Trishana McGowan; Sherene Pinnock; Sonita Sutherland	3:40.12	Bahamas; Thomasina Grant; Tavara Rigby; Angelorine Villvan; Cotrell Martin	3:52.47		

: Open event for both junior and youth athletes.

=== Boys under 17 (Youth) ===
Event	Gold		Silver		Bronze	
100 metres (-1.7 m/s)	Ramaldo Turner (JAM)	11.13	Dario Alleyne (BAR)	11.13	Dax Danns (GUY)	11.18
200 metres (1.6 m/s)	Dario Alleyne (BAR)	21.79	Dax Danns (GUY)	21.94	Winston Barnes (JAM)	22.02
400 metres	Dario Alleyne (BAR)	48.44	Dax Danns (GUY)	49.47	Gawain Gray (JAM)	49.57
800 metres	Theon O'Connor (JAM)	1:55.66	Jamaal James (TRI)	1:55.76	Bengallo Morrison (JAM)	1:59.54
1500 metres	Taijaun Talbot (BER)	4:17.15	Bengallo Morrison (JAM)	4:17.84	Desrick Brooks (JAM)	4:21.87
3000 metres	Desrick Brooks (JAM)	9:29.23	Cody Lima (BER)	9:31.25	Juan Robles (ISV)	9:53.88
100 metres hurdles (-0.3 m/s)	Akeem Smith (JAM)	13.60	Ronnie Griffith (BAR)	13.83	Johan Mautil (MTQ)	13.95
400 metres hurdles	Christopher Adderley (BAH)	55.49	Sandor Pennicott (JAM)	55.67		
High jump	Omari Dookie (JAM)	1.95	Sheldon King (BAH)	1.85	Kurt Felix (GRN); Omar Harvey (TCA)	1.80
Long jump	Robert Peddlar (JAM)	6.86 w (3.9 m/s)	Jonathan Davis (BAH)	6.74 w (6.3 m/s)	Kyrie Caton (TRI)	6.74 w (4.2 m/s)
Triple jump	Robert Peddlar (JAM)	14.57 w (2.1 m/s)	Brandon Joseph (ATG)	14.33 w (2.5 m/s)	Nicholas Gordon (JAM)	13.63 w (2.8 m/s)
Shot put	Raymond Brown (JAM)	15.82	Ramone Berch (JAM)	15.22	Kerron Browne (TRI)	14.92
Discus throw	Sheldon Roach (BAR)	47.25	Ramone Berch (JAM)	45.98	Kellon Marshall (TRI)	44.11
Javelin throw	Kurt Felix (GRN)	50.29	Davis Hypolite (DMA)	48.21	Elvin Carey (BAH)	44.65
4 x 100 metres relay	Jamaica; Ramaldo Turner; Sandor Pennicott; Akeem Smith; Winston Barnes	42.74	Bahamas; Desmond MacKey; Jonathan Davis; Larry Pinder; Deangelo Sands	43.08	Trinidad and Tobago; Jamal Clinton; Damir Smith; Kervin Morgan; Kellon Marshall	43.09
4 x 400 metres relay	Trinidad and Tobago; Akil Farrell-Jones; Maurice De Leon; Kervin Morgan; Jamaal James	3:24.07	Bahamas; Keyon Minns; Christopher Adderley; Carey Leshard; Deangelo Sands	3:25.21	Jamaica; Sandor Pennicott; Gawain Gray; Bengallo Morrison; Theon O'Connor	3:47.24

=== Girls under 17 (Youth) ===
Event	Gold		Silver		Bronze	
100 metres (-1.1 m/s)	Schillonie Calvert (JAM)	11.98	Kimberly Smith (JAM)	11.99	T'Shonda Webb (BAH)	12.16
200 metres (-0.6 m/s)	Schillonie Calvert (JAM)	24.18	Kimberly Smith (JAM)	24.62	T'Shonda Webb (BAH)	24.64
400 metres	Julie Smith (JAM)	55.02	Britney St. Louis (TRI)	55.29	Sade St. Louis (TRI)	55.33
800 metres	Vanessa Boyd (JAM)	2:21.66	Emilie Ducados (MTQ)	2:22.04	Deanne Lightbourn (BER)	2:22.98
1500 metres	Jessica McLeod (JAM)	4:51.38	Doraine Samuels (JAM)	4:57.27	Christina Badmus (BAH)	5:01.75
100 metres hurdles (-0.3 m/s)	Natasha Ruddock (JAM)	14.35	Kimberly Laing (JAM)	14.76	Kimberly Stanford (BAR)	15.00
300 metres hurdles	Michelle Cumberbatch (BAH)	42.37	Judith Riley (JAM)	42.72	Kierre Beckles (BAR)	44.23
High jump	La Troya Darrell (BER)	1.68	Skeeter Isaac (GRN)	1.65	Cara Bowleg (BAH); Andrea Moss (BAH)	1.60
Long jump	Lyvie-Paola Laurent (GLP)	5.97 w (2.4 m/s)	Shara Proctor (AIA)	5.83 w NWI	Kimona Smith (JAM)	5.64 w (3.4 m/s)
Triple jump	Kimberly Williams (JAM)	12.53 CR (-0.6 m/s)	Kimona Smith (JAM)	12.22 (-1.4 m/s)	Lyvie-Paola Laurent (GLP)	12.20 w (4.3 m/s)
Shot put	Johanna Wachter (GLP)	11.98	Gabrielle Nixon (BAH)	11.89	Kenisha Throughsingh (JAM)	11.46
Discus throw	Latanya Nation (JAM)	37.74	Johanna Wachter (GLP)	35.06	Kenisha Throughsingh (JAM)	33.39
Javelin throw	Kyann Maynard (BAR)	40.51	Kenisha Throughsingh (JAM)	38.18	Amanda Edwards (ATG)	36.10
4 x 100 metres relay	Jamaica; Kimberly Laing; Kimberly Smith; Natasha Ruddock; Schillonie Calvert	46.40	Grenada; Ann-Marie Francis; Natalie Hypolite; Christelle Collins; Allison George	47.68	Trinidad and Tobago; Samantha McLetchie; Semoy Hackett; Britney St. Louis; Sade St. Louis	47.79
4 x 400 metres relay	Jamaica; Bobby-Gaye Wilkins; Julie Smith; Judith Riley; Vanessa Boyd	3:48.32	Bahamas; Deandra Knowles; Michelle Cumberbatch; Taniel Poitier; Cache Armbrister	3:55.13	Bermuda; Brittany Pitt; Deanne Lightbourn; Shelby Hollis; Arantxa King	4:00.45

== Medal table (unofficial) ==
The medal count has been published. There is a mismatch between the unofficial medal count and the published medal count for Jamaica and the Bahamas. This can be explained by the fact that there were only two competitors in the events boys U20 pole vault, girls U20 400m hurdles, girls U20 4 × 400 m relay, boys U17 400m hurdles, therefore not having been considered in the published medal count.

* Host nation (Bermuda)

Rank	Nation	Gold	Silver	Bronze	Total
1	Jamaica (JAM)	40	25	19	84
2	Barbados (BAR)	5	2	4	11
3	Bahamas (BAH)	4	9	11	24
4	Trinidad and Tobago (TTO)	4	7	11	22
5	Bermuda (BER)*	4	2	3	9
6	Grenada (GRN)	3	4	4	11
7	Guadeloupe (GLP)	2	2	3	7
8	Antigua and Barbuda (ATG)	2	2	1	5
9	Guyana (GUY)	1	3	1	5
10	Saint Lucia (LCA)	1	1	0	2
11	Martinique (MTQ)	0	3	3	6
12	Cayman Islands (CAY)	0	3	0	3
13	Dominica (DMA)	0	2	0	2
14	Commonwealth Games Federation (CGF)	0	1	0	1
14	Saint Vincent and the Grenadines (VIN)	0	1	0	1
16	U.S. Virgin Islands (VIR)	0	0	2	2
17	Turks and Caicos Islands (TKS)	0	0	1	1
Totals (17 entries)		66	67	63	196
