= Germaine Mason =

Jamaican-British athlete (1983–2017)

- Mason in 2008 Summer Olympics

Personal information
- Nationality: British/Jamaican
- Born: 20 January 1983 Kingston, Jamaica
- Died: 20 April 2017 (aged 34) Kingston, Jamaica
- Height: 195 cm (6 ft 5 in)
- Weight: 80 kg (176 lb)

Sport
- Sport: Track and field
- Event: High jump
- Club: Birchfield Harriers
Medal record
Men's athletics
Representing Great Britain
Olympic Games
Silver medal – second place	2008 Beijing	High jump
Representing Jamaica
World Junior Championships
Silver medal – second place	2000 Chile	High jump
Bronze medal – third place	2002 Kingston	High jump
World Indoor Championships
Bronze medal – third place	2004 Budapest	High jump
Pan American Games
Gold medal – first place	2003 Santo Domingo	High jump
CAC Junior Championships (U20)
Gold medal – first place	2002 Bridgetown	High jump
Gold medal – first place	2000 San Juan	High jump
CARIFTA Games Junior (U20)
Gold medal – first place	2000 St. George's	High jump
Silver medal – second place	2002 Nassau	High jump
CARIFTA Games Youth (U17)
Gold medal – first place	1999 Fort-de-France	High jump

Germaine Mason (20 January 1983 – 20 April 2017) was a Jamaican-born track and field athlete competing in high jump. In 2006, he switched sporting allegiance, and then represented Great Britain. As a Great Britain competitor, he won the silver medal at the 2008 Summer Olympics.

== Biography ==
Mason won silver and bronze medals at the World Junior Championships in 2000 and 2002 respectively, the latter event held in his hometown of Kingston. His first medal at senior level came at the 2003 Pan American Games in Santo Domingo, when he won a gold medal, having achieved a personal best jump of 2.34 metres. He finished fifth at the World Championships the same year.

The following seasons saw him drop to 2.25 m (2004) and 2.27 m (2005), but 2.25 m was enough to win a bronze medal at the 2004 IAAF World Indoor Championships. The medal was won jointly with Jaroslav Bába and Ştefan Vasilache.

Mason was eligible to represent Great Britain because his father David was born in London. Mason's mother persuaded him to switch allegiance, and Mason's change in nationality was ratified by athletics' governing body, the IAAF, in 2006.

Mason won a silver medal for Great Britain at the Beijing Olympics on 19 August 2008. He equalled his personal best of 2.34 m, beaten only by Russia's Andrey Silnov with 2.36 m. It was Great Britain's first track and field medal of the games.

Mason became the British high jump champion after winning the British Athletics Championships in 2009.

== Death ==
Mason died in a motorbike accident on 20 April 2017 at the age of 34. Upon returning from a soca party he was riding his motorbike when he crashed. His funeral was held at the Hagley Park Seventh-day Adventist Church in Kingston, Jamaica. His friend Usain Bolt was a pallbearer and dug the grave of Mason.

== Achievements ==
Year	Competition	Venue	Position	Event	Notes
Representing Jamaica
1999	CARIFTA Games (U17)	Fort-de-France, Martinique	1st	high jump	2.03 m
2000	CARIFTA Games (U20)	St. George's, Grenada, Grenada	1st	high jump	2.12 m
2000	CAC Junior Championships (U20)	San Juan, Puerto Rico	1st	high jump	2.15 m
2000	World Junior Championships	Santiago, Chile	2nd	high jump	2.24 m
2002	CARIFTA Games (U20)	Nassau, Bahamas	2nd	high jump	2.16 m
2002	CAC Junior Championships (U20)	Bridgetown, Barbados	1st	high jump	2.23 m
2002	World Junior Championships	Kingston, Jamaica	3rd	high jump	2.21 m
2002	Commonwealth Games	Manchester, Great Britain	5th	high jump	2.20 m
2003	World Indoor Championships	Birmingham, Great Britain	–	high jump	NM
2003	Pan American Games	Santo Domingo, Dominican Republic	1st	high jump	2.34 m
2003	World Championships	Paris, France	5th	high jump	2.29 m
2004	World Indoor Championships	Budapest, Hungary	3rd	high jump	2.25 m
Representing Great Britain
2006	European Championships	Gothenburg, Sweden	17th (q)	high jump	2.19 m
2007	World Championships	Osaka, Japan	27th (q)	high jump	2.19 m
2008	Olympic Games	Beijing, China	2nd	high jump	2.34 m
