= Shamir Thomas =

Grenadian track and field thrower

Personal information
- Nationality: Grenada
- Born: November 3, 1983 (age 42)

Sport
- Sport: Track and field
- Event(s): Shot put Discus throw Hammer throw

Achievements and titles
- Personal best(s): Shot put: 16.83 m Discus throw: 52.91; Hammer throw:31.62
Medal record
CARIFTA Games (U17)
Gold medal – first place	1998 Port of Spain	Shot put
Silver medal – second place	1998 Port of Spain	Discus throw
Gold medal – first place	1999 Port of Spain	Shot put
Silver medal – second place	1999 Port of Spain	Discus throw
CARIFTA Games (U20)
Silver medal – second place	2000 St. George's	Shot put
Bronze medal – third place	2000 St. George's	Discus throw
Gold medal – first place	2001 Bridgetown	Shot put
Gold medal – first place	2001 Bridgetown	Discus throw
Silver medal – second place	2002 Nassau	Shot put
Gold medal – first place	2002 Nassau	Discus throw
Central American and Caribbean Junior Champs(U17)
Gold medal – first place	1998 Georgetown	Shot put
Silver medal – second place	1998 Georgetown	Discus throw
Central American and Caribbean Junior Champs(U20)
Silver medal – second place	2002 Bridgetown	Shot put
Bronze medal – third place	2002 Bridgetown	Discus throw

Shamir Thomas (born 3 November 1983) is a Grenadian retired track and field athlete who specialized in the throwing events. With multiple CARIFTA and other games medals, Shamir is one of the most successful Grenadian athletes in the throwing events at the Youth and Junior levels.

== Competition record ==
Year	Competition	Venue	Position	Event	Notes
Representing Grenada
1998	CARIFTA Games	Port of Spain	1st	Shot put (U17)	14.66 m
1998	CARIFTA Games	Port of Spain	2nd	Discus throw	42.36 m
1998	Central American and Caribbean Junior Champs	Port of Spain	1st	Shot put (U17)	14.20 m
1998	Central American and Caribbean Junior Champs	Port of Spain	2nd	Discus throw (U17)	40.59 m
1999	CARIFTA Games	Port of Spain	1st	Shot put (U17)	14.37 m
1999	CARIFTA Games	Port of Spain	1st	Discus throw(U17)	47.79 m
2000	CARIFTA Games	St. George's, Grenada	2nd	Shot put (U20)	13.88 m
2000	CARIFTA Games	St. George's, Grenada	3rd	Discus throw (U20)	46.18 m
2001	CARIFTA Games	Bridgetown, Barbados	1st	Shot put (U20)	14.69 m
2001	CARIFTA Games	Bridgetown, Barbados	1st	Discus throw (U20)	47.56 m
2002	CARIFTA Games	Nassau, Bahamas	2nd	Shot put (U20)	14.85 m
2002	CARIFTA Games	Nassau, Bahamas	1st	Discus throw (U20)	48.80 m
2002	Central American and Caribbean Junior Champs	Bridgetown, Barbados	2nd	Shot put	16.83 m
2002	Central American and Caribbean Junior Champs	Bridgetown, Barbados	3rd	Discus throw	50.97 m
