= 2012 French Indoor Athletics Championships =

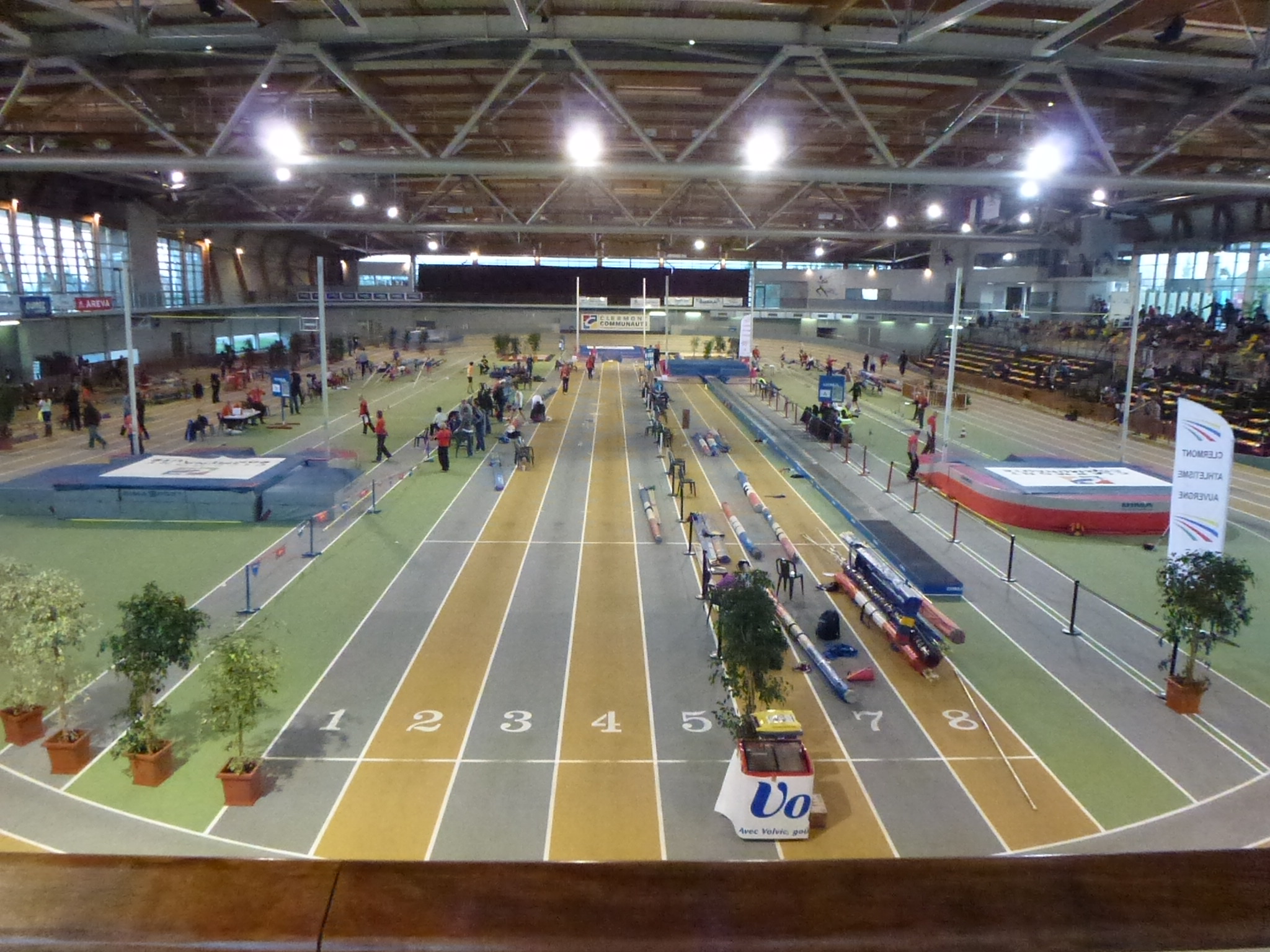
- The host stadium
- Dates: 25–26 February 2012
- Host city: Aubière
- Venue: Jean-Pellez Stadium
- Events: 26

The 2012 French Indoor Athletics Championships was the 41st edition of the national championship in indoor track and field for France, organised by the French Athletics Federation. It was held on 25–26 February 2012 at the Jean-Pellez Stadium in Aubière. A total of 26 events (divided evenly between the sexes) were contested over the two-day competition.

== Results ==
=== Men ===
Event	Gold		Silver		Bronze	
60 metres	Christophe Lemaitre	6.59	Emmanuel Biron	6.60	Yannick Fonsat	6.67
200 metres	Yannick Fonsat	20.82	Pierre-Alexis Pessonneaux	21.10	Jean-Baptiste Formet	21.27
400 metres	Jonathan Vilaine	47.60	Ali Bounoua	47.97	Mehdi Omara Besson	48.67
800 metres	Ismaël Koné	1:51.70	Florent Maillard	1:51.90	Azzedine Boudjemaa	1:52.43
1500 metres	Bryan Cantero	3:44.46	Grégory Beugnet	3:44.88	Matthieu Garel	3:47.03
5000 m walk	Antonin Boyez	20:34.29	Xavier Le Coz	20:47.91	Sebastien Delauney	20:55.58
60 m hurdles	Pascal Martinot-Lagarde	7.54	Cédric Lavanne	7.64	Ladji Doucouré	7.71
High jump	Mickaël Hanany	2.26 m	Fabrice Saint-Jean	2.23 m	Abdoulaye Diarra	2.23 m
Pole vault	Renaud Lavillenie	5.72 m	Émile Denecker	5.45 m	Steve Dume	5.45 m
Long jump	Nicolas Gomont	8.05 m	Salim Sdiri	7.94 m	Benoit Maxwell	7.62 m
Triple jump	Benjamin Compaoré	17.13 m	Harold Correa	16.72 m	Colomba Fofana	16.57 m
Shot put	Tumatai Dauphin	19.11 m	Stephane Szuster	17.33 m	Yann Lance	17.05 m
Heptathlon	Bastien Auzeil	5891 pts	Gaël Querin	5799 pts	Jérémy Lelièvre	5583 pts

=== Women ===
Event	Gold		Silver		Bronze	
60 metres	Myriam Soumaré	7.29	Ayodelé Ikuesan	7.30	Carima Louami	7.33
200 metres	Myriam Soumaré	23.11	Lina Jacques-Sébastien	23.15	Johanna Danois	23.75
400 metres	Marie Gayot	53.16	Asta Drame	54.82	Agnès Raharolahy	55.23
800 metres	Clarisse Moh	2:04:63.	Ophélie Claude-Boxberger	2:08.76	Ophelie Sextius	2:10.81
1500 metres	Claire Navez	4:22.71	Hayet Ferahtia	4:25.53	Sandra Beuvière	4:25.68
3000 m walk	Sylwia Korzeniowska	12:48.91	Fabienne Rinero Chanfreau	13:45.72	Amandine Marcou	14:05.64
60 m hurdles	Reïna-Flor Okori	8.08	Sandra Gomis	8.10	Adrianna Lamalle	8.11
High jump	Mélanie Melfort	1.93 m	Nina Manga	1.78 m	Sandrine Champion	1.78 m
Pole vault	Vanessa Boslak	4.42 m	Maria Leonor Tavares	4.42 m	Marion Buisson	4.32 m
Long jump	Haoua Kessely	6.51 m	Charlène Quernel	6.30 m	Marquilu Nervilus	6.21 m
Triple jump	Nathalie Marie-Nely	14.01 m	Teresa Nzola Meso Ba	13.84 m	Amy Zongo-Filet	13.61 m
Shot put	Jessica Cérival	17.16 m	Fabienne Ngoma	14.67 m	Lucie Catouillard	14.44 m
Pentathlon	Blandine Maisonnier	4339 pts	Merryl Mbeng	4013 pts	Aurélie Chaboudez	4000 pts
