= Damon Thompson =

Barbadian athletics competitor

Medal record

Men's athletics

Representing Barbados

CAC Junior Championships (U20)
Silver medal – second place	2000 San Juan	High jump
Silver medal – second place	2002 Bridgetown	High jump

CARIFTA Games Junior (U20)
Gold medal – first place	2001 Bridgetown	High jump
Gold medal – first place	2002 Nassau	High jump
Silver medal – second place	2000 St. George's	High jump

CARIFTA Games Youth (U17)
Silver medal – second place	1999 Fort-de-France	High jump
Bronze medal – third place	1998 Port of Spain	High jump

Damon Thompson (born 5 March 1983) is a retired Barbadian track and field athlete who competed in high jump.

== Personal best ==
Event	Result	Venue	Date
Outdoor
High jump	2.20 m	(Barbados) Bridgetown	14 April 2001

== Achievements ==
Year	Competition	Venue	Position	Event	Notes
Representing Barbados
1998	CARIFTA Games (U17)	Port of Spain, Trinidad and Tobago	3rd	high jump	1.95 m
1999	CARIFTA Games (U17)	Fort-de-France, Martinique	2nd	high jump	1.95 m
2000	CARIFTA Games (U20)	St. George's, Grenada, Grenada	2nd	high jump	2.12 m
2000	CAC Junior Championships (U20)	San Juan, Puerto Rico	2nd	high jump	2.05 m
2000	NACAC U25 Championships	Monterrey, Mexico	3rd	high jump	2.05 m
2000	World Junior Championships	Santiago, Chile	–	high jump	NM
2001	CARIFTA Games (U20)	Bridgetown, Barbados	1st	high jump	2.20 m CR
2001	CAC Championships	Guatemala City, Guatemala	3rd	high jump	2.15 m
2002	CARIFTA Games (U20)	Nassau, Bahamas	1st	high jump	2.18 m
2002	CAC Junior Championships (U20)	Bridgetown, Barbados	2nd	high jump	2.20 m
2002	World Junior Championships	Kingston, Jamaica	31st (q)	high jump	2.08 m
2002	Commonwealth Games	Manchester, Great Britain	7th	high jump	2.15 m
2003	CAC Championships	St George's, Grenada, Grenada	4th	high jump	2.15 m
2004	NACAC U23 Championships	Sherbrooke, Canada	3rd	high jump	2.10 m
2006	Central American and Caribbean Games	Cartagena, Colombia	10th	high jump	2.05 m
