= Simone Facey =

Jamaican sprinter (born 1985)

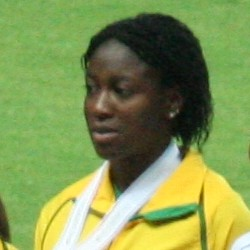

Personal information
- Born: 7 May 1985 (age 41) Manchester, Jamaica
- Height: 1.62 m (5 ft 4 in)
- Weight: 53 kg (117 lb)

Sport
- Country: Jamaica
- Sport: Track and field
- Event: 100 metres
Medal record
Olympic Games
Silver medal – second place	2016 Rio de Janeiro	4 × 100 m relay
World Championships
Gold medal – first place	2009 Berlin	4 × 100 m relay
Silver medal – second place	2007 Osaka	4 × 100 m relay
Bronze medal – third place	2017 London	4 × 100 m relay
Pan American Games
Silver medal – second place	2011 Guadalajara	200 m
Silver medal – second place	2015 Toronto	4 × 100 m relay
Bronze medal – third place	2015 Toronto	200 m
CAC Junior Championships (U20)
Gold medal – first place	2000 San Juan	200 m
Gold medal – first place	2000 San Juan	4 × 100 m relay
Gold medal – first place	2002 Bridgetown	100 m
Gold medal – first place	2002 Bridgetown	200 m
Gold medal – first place	2002 Bridgetown	4 × 100 m relay
CARIFTA Games Junior (U20)
Gold medal – first place	2004 Hamilton	100 m
Gold medal – first place	2004 Hamilton	4 × 100 m relay
CARIFTA Games Youth (U17)
Gold medal – first place	2001 Bridgetown	4 × 100 m relay
Gold medal – first place	2001 Bridgetown	100 m
Gold medal – first place	2001 Bridgetown	200 m
Silver medal – second place	2000 St. George's	200 m

Simone Facey (born 7 May 1985) is a Jamaican sprinter who specializes in the 100 metres.

== Career ==
Simone attended Vere Technical High School in Clarendon, Jamaica. At the 2002 World Junior Championships in Kingston, she won a silver medal in the 100 m by running 11.43. She then came back and anchored Jamaica to a gold medal in the 4 × 100. In her 2004 season, Simone broke Veronica Campbell's national junior record in the 200 m of 22.92 by running 22.71. She then doubled at the 2004 Boys and Girls National Championships by winning the 100 m and 200 m. At the 2004 Penn Relays, Simone anchored her team to a record of 44.32 in the 4 × 100. While at Texas A&M, Simone won the 100 m title at Big 12 Track and Field Championships in a meet record 10.95. Almost four weeks later, she beat teammate, Porscha Lucas, and won the NCAA 200 m title. In 2009, Simone took third place in the 200 m at the 2009 Jamaican championships, guaranteeing her a place on the Jamaican team for the 2009 World Championships in Athletics. However, she only managed 11.23 seconds, and fourth place, in the 100 m thus failed to qualify for her preferred event.

== Achievements ==
Year	Competition	Venue	Position	Event	Notes
Representing Jamaica
2000	CARIFTA Games	St. George's, Grenada	2nd	200 m	24.32 w (2.5 m/s)
2001	CARIFTA Games	Bridgetown, Barbados	1st	100 m	11.78 (0.0 m/s)
2001	CARIFTA Games	Bridgetown, Barbados	1st	200 m	24.15 (-4.0 m/s)
2001	CARIFTA Games	Bridgetown, Barbados	1st	4 × 100 m relay	45.44
2001	World Youth Championships	Debrecen, Hungary	4th	100 m	11.83 (0.5 m/s)
2001	World Youth Championships	Debrecen, Hungary	4th (sf)	200 m	24.48 (0.4 m/s)
2002	Central American and Caribbean Junior Championships (U-20)	Bridgetown, Barbados	1st	100 m	11.46 (0.0 m/s)
2002	Central American and Caribbean Junior Championships (U-20)	Bridgetown, Barbados	1st	200 m	23.22 CR (-0.9 m/s)
2002	Central American and Caribbean Junior Championships (U-20)	Bridgetown, Barbados	1st	4 × 100 m relay	44.30
2002	World Junior Championships	Kingston, Jamaica	2nd	100 m	11.43 (-0.2 m/s)
2002	World Junior Championships	Kingston, Jamaica	1st	4 × 100 m relay	43.40 CR
2004	CARIFTA Games	Hamilton, Bermuda	1st	100 m	11.72 (-1.7 m/s)
2004	CARIFTA Games	Hamilton, Bermuda	1st	4 × 100 m relay	45.22
2007	World Championships	Osaka, Japan	2nd	4 × 100 m relay	42.01
2009	World Championships	Berlin, Germany	6th	200 m	22.80
2009	World Championships	Berlin, Germany	1st	4 × 100 m relay	42.06
2011	Central American and Caribbean Championships	Mayagüez, Puerto Rico	3rd	100 m	11.39
2011	Central American and Caribbean Championships	Mayagüez, Puerto Rico	2nd	4 × 100 m relay	43.63
2011	Pan American Games	Guadalajara, Mexico	2nd	200 m	22.86
2017	World Championships	London, United Kingdom	17th (sf)	100 m	11.23
2017	World Championships	London, United Kingdom	3rd	4 × 100 m relay	42.19

=== Personal bests ===
- 100 metres – 10.95 s (2008)
- 200 metres – 22.25 s (2008)
