= Damion Barry =

Trinidadian sprinter

Personal information
- Born: 3 March 1982 (age 44) Chaguanas, Trinidad and Tobago

Sport
- Sport: Track and field
Medal record
Athletics
Representing Trinidad and Tobago
Central American and Caribbean Games
Silver medal – second place	2006 Cartagena	4x400 m relay
CAC Junior Championships (U20)
Bronze medal – third place	2000 San Juan	400 m
Bronze medal – third place	2000 San Juan	4x400 m relay
CAC Junior Championships (U17)
Silver medal – second place	1998 George Town	400 m
Silver medal – second place	1998 George Town	4x100 m relay
Silver medal – second place	1998 George Town	4x400 m relay
CARIFTA Games Junior (U20)
Gold medal – first place	2001 Bridgetown	400 m
Gold medal – first place	2000 St. George's	400 m
CARIFTA Games Youth (U17)
Silver medal – second place	1998 Port of Spain	400 m

Damion Ian Kenton Barry (born 3 March 1982) is a sprinter from Trinidad and Tobago who specializes in the 400 metres.

His personal best time is 45.55 seconds, achieved in June 2005 in Port-of-Spain.

He attended the Kansas City Kansas Community College and Auburn University in the United States.

He is currently a School Resource Officer for Auburn High School of Auburn City Schools in Auburn, Alabama.

== Competition record ==
Year	Competition	Venue	Position	Event	Notes
Representing Trinidad and Tobago
1998	CARIFTA Games (U17)	Port of Spain, Trinidad and Tobago	2nd	400 m	48.44
1998	Central American and Caribbean Junior Championships (U17)	Georgetown, Cayman Islands	2nd	400 m	49.03
1998	Central American and Caribbean Junior Championships (U17)	Georgetown, Cayman Islands	2nd	4 × 100 m	42.21
1998	Central American and Caribbean Junior Championships (U17)	Georgetown, Cayman Islands	2nd	4 × 400 m	3:18.80
2000	CARIFTA Games (U20)	St. George's, Grenada	1st	400 m	46.63
2000	CARIFTA Games (U20)	St. George's, Grenada	1st	4 × 400 m	3:12.73
2000	Central American and Caribbean Junior Championships (U20)	San Juan, Puerto Rico	3rd	400 m	47.48
2000	Central American and Caribbean Junior Championships (U20)	San Juan, Puerto Rico	3rd	4 × 400 m	3:12.84
2000	World Junior Championships	Santiago, Chile	4th	400 m	45.86
2000	World Junior Championships	Santiago, Chile	9th (h)	4 × 400 m	3:10.99
2000	Olympic Games	Sydney, Australia	24th (h)	4 × 400 m	3:07.51
2001	CARIFTA Games (U20)	Bridgetown, Barbados	1st	400 m	46.51
2001	CARIFTA Games (U20)	Bridgetown, Barbados	2nd	4 × 400 m	3:09.50
2001	Central American and Caribbean Championships	Guatemala City, Guatemala	5th	400 m	46.89
2001	Pan American Junior Championships	Santa Fe, Argentina	1st	400 m	46.40
2003	World Indoor Championships	Birmingham, United Kingdom	13th (h)	400 m	47.21
2003	Central American and Caribbean Championships	St. George's, Grenada	6th	400 m	46.30
2003	Central American and Caribbean Championships	St. George's, Grenada	3rd	4 × 400 m	3:04.48
2003	Pan American Games	Santo Domingo, Dominican Republic	12th (h)	400 m	46.79
2003	Pan American Games	Santo Domingo, Dominican Republic	4th	4 × 400 m	3:05.28
2004	South American U23 Championships	Barquisimeto, Venezuela	1st	4 × 400 m relay	3:05.55
2005	Central American and Caribbean Championships	Nassau, Bahamas	4th	400 m	45.60
2005	Central American and Caribbean Championships	Nassau, Bahamas	2nd	4 × 400 m	3:01.43
2005	World Championships	Helsinki, Finland	28th (sf)	400 m	46.20
2005	World Championships	Helsinki, Finland	5th (h)	4 × 400 m	3:01.91
2006	Commonwealth Games	Melbourne, Australia	23rd (sf)	400 m	46.96
2006	Commonwealth Games	Melbourne, Australia	4th (h)	4 × 400 m	3:04.14
2006	Central American and Caribbean Games	Cartagena, Colombia	2nd	4 × 400 m	3:02.65
