= Winston Smith (athlete) =

Jamaican sprinter

Medal record

Men's athletics

Representing Jamaica

Commonwealth Games
Gold medal – first place	2006 Melbourne	4 × 100 m relay

CARIFTA Games Junior (U20)
Gold medal – first place	2000 St. George's	4 × 100 m relay
Silver medal – second place	2000 St. George's	200 m
Silver medal – second place	2001 Bridgetown	200 m
Silver medal – second place	2001 Bridgetown	4 × 100 m relay

Winston Smith (born 22 November 1982) is a Jamaican track and field sprinter who competed in the men's 4 × 100 metres relay at the 2004 Summer Olympics in Athens. He was the heat runner for the Jamaican men's relay team at the 2006 Commonwealth Games, where the team won gold in the final.
