= Walt Williams (athlete) =

Grenadian shot putter

Personal information
- Nationality: Grenada
- Born: 7 May 1985 (age 41)

Sport
- Sport: Track and field
- Event: Shot put

Achievements and titles
- Personal bests: Shot put: 17.26 m NR
Medal record
CARIFTA Games (U17)
Bronze medal – third place	2000 St. George's	Shot Put
Gold medal – first place	2001 Bridgetown	Discus Throw
Silver medal – second place	2001 Bridgetown	Shot Put
CARIFTA Games (U20)
Silver medal – second place	2004 Hamilton	Shot Put
Bronze medal – third place	2004 Hamilton	Discus Throw

Walt Williams (born 7 May 1985) is a Grenadian retired track and field athlete who specialized in the throwing events. On April 28, 2007 he threw the shot put a distance of 17.26 m, in the process setting a national record. He won medals at the CARIFTA Games in both discus and shot put from 2000 to 2004. He represented Grenada at the 2006 NACAC Under-23 Championships in Athletics, finishing in fifth place.

In 2016 he launched a sporting club in order to develop athletes with the aim of having them qualify for the 2020 summer olympics.

== Competition record ==
Year	Competition	Venue	Position	Event	Notes
Representing Grenada
2000	CARIFTA Games U17	St. George's, Grenada	3rd	Shot put	13.55 m
2001	CARIFTA Games U17	Bridgetown, Barbados	2nd	Shot put	14.11 m
2001	CARIFTA Games U17	Bridgetown, Barbados	1st	Discus throw	47.60 m
2004	CARIFTA Games U20	Hamilton, Bermuda	2nd	Shot put	16.69 m
2004	CARIFTA Games U20	Hamilton, Bermuda	3rd	Discus throw	49.55 m
2006	NACAC U23 Championships	Santo Domingo, Dominican Republic	5th	Shot put	15.49 m
