= Grafton Ifill =

Banking Executive & Former Bahamian sprinter

Personal information
- Full name: Grafton Ifill III
- Born: November 10, 1985 (age 40)
Medal record
Athletics
Representing Bahamas
CAC Championships
Bronze medal – third place	2005 Nassau	4×100 m relay
CAC Junior Championships (U20)
Gold medal – first place	2002 Bridgetown	200 m
Bronze medal – third place	2002 Bridgetown	4×100 m relay
CAC Junior Championships (U17)
Silver medal – second place	2000 San Juan	4x400 m relay
Bronze medal – third place	2000 San Juan	4x100 m relay
CARIFTA Games Junior (U20)
Silver medal – second place	2002 Nassau	100m
Silver medal – second place	2002 Nassau	200m
Silver medal – second place	2004 Hamilton	4x100 m relay
Bronze medal – third place	2002 Nassau	4x100 m relay
Bronze medal – third place	2004 Hamilton	100m
CARIFTA Games Youth (U17)
Gold medal – first place	2001 Bridgetown	100m
Gold medal – first place	2001 Bridgetown	200m
Gold medal – first place	2001 Bridgetown	4x100 m relay
Bronze medal – third place	2000 St. George's	100m
Bronze medal – third place	2000 St. George's	200m

Grafton Ifill III (born November 10, 1985) is a former Bahamian sprinter from Nassau, Bahamas who competed in the 100m and 200m. He attended St. Augustine's College in Nassau, Bahamas before going on to compete for the University of Pennsylvania.

He is remembered in the Bahamas for defeating Usain Bolt at the 2001 CARIFTA Games over 200m. Bolt would go on to dominate at the Jr Level thereafter.

Ifill is now a Market Leader for JP Morgan Private Bank after spending most of his career at Goldman Sachs.

== Personal bests ==
Event	Time	Venue	Date
100 m	10.39 (+1.6)	Grosseto, Italy	13 JUL 2004
200 m	20.89 (+0.1)	Bridgetown, Barbados	05 JUL 2002
