= Stephanie Ferguson =

Stephanie Linda Ferguson
- Education: Virginia Commonwealth University; University of Virginia
- Scientific career
- Workplaces: Harvard T.H. Chan School of Public Health; University of Lynchburg
- Thesis: Evalulation of the effects of peer counseling in a culturally-specific adolescent pregnancy prevention program for African American females (1996)

Stephanie Ferguson is an American nurse who is Director of the Harvard Global Nursing Leadership Program and Professor of the Practice of Health Policy at the Harvard T.H. Chan School of Public Health. She is an elected member of the National Academy of Medicine and American Academy of Nursing.

== Early life and education ==
Ferguson had allergic asthma as a child. She attended Appomattox Elementary School, where she remembers spending a lot of time with the school nurse. She studied nursing at Virginia Commonwealth University. After graduating, she started working at the VCU Medical Center on a sickle cell disease screening program for newborn babies. At the time, one in every 325 African American babies born in Virginia had sickle cell. Early diagnosis and treatment can prevent fatal consequences. Working with the Sickle Cell Anaemia Awareness Program, Ferguson gathered evidence for state-mandated screening. The legislation was enacted in 1989. Her doctorate considered the effects of peer counselling in adolescent pregnancy prevention. In 1996, Ferguson was appointed a White House Fellow, working alongside Bill Clinton and Donna Shalala.

== Research and career ==
In 2009, Ferguson was appointed a professor of nursing at the University of Lynchburg. She directed the Community Nursing Organization, developing health centres led by nurse practitioners across Richmond. In 2016, she was elected to the National Committee on Global Health. In 2022, she was appointed Professor of Practice at the Harvard T.H. Chan School of Public Health.

Ferguson helped to convene the Harvard Global Nursing Leadership Program's Certificate in Global Public Health for Nurse Leaders. The program, which ran for the first time in 2022, partnered with the Africa Centres for Disease Control and Prevention to champion nursing leadership around the world. It built upon nurses' broad expertise (e.g. pandemic response) and insight, and the urgent need for their efforts in shaping health policy.

== Awards and honors ==
- 2014 Elected to the National Academy of Medicine
- 2014 HRH Princess Muna Al Hussein Award
- 2020 American Academy of Nursing Civitas Award
- 2024 University of Pennsylvania Commencement Speaker
- Elected Member of the American Academy of Nursing

== Selected publications ==
- Stephanie L Ferguson (1 July 2015). "Transformational Nurse Leaders Key to Strengthening Health Systems Worldwide". Journal of Nursing Administration. 45 (7–8): 351–353. doi:10.1097/nna.0000000000000212. ISSN 0002-0443. PMID 26204374. Wikidata Q38981837.
- Stephanie L Ferguson; Fatima Al Rifai; Maisa Maay'a; et al. (1 March 2016). "The ICN Leadership For Change™ Programme--20 years of growing influence". International Nursing Review. 63 (1): 15–25. doi:10.1111/inr.12248. ISSN 0020-8132. PMC 5515374. PMID 26923323. S2CID 205217613. Wikidata Q33915155.
- Stephanie L Ferguson (1 November 2013). "The global quest for nursing excellence". Journal of Nursing Administration. 43 (11): 555–556. doi:10.1097/01.nna.0000434514.27739.e2. ISSN 0002-0443. PMID 24153194. Wikidata Q46389974.
