= Wilan Louis =

Barbadian sprinter (born 1983)

Personal information
- Nationality: Barbadian
- Born: 1 March 1983 (age 43)

Sport
- Sport: Sprinting
- Event: 4 × 100 metres relay

Wilan Louis (born 1 March 1983) is a Barbadian sprinter. He competed in the men's 4 × 100 metres relay at the 2000 Summer Olympics.
