= Patricia Hall (athlete) =

Jamaican sprinter (born 1982)

Personal information
- Full name: Patricia Hall-Pritchett
- Nationality: Jamaican
- Born: 16 October 1982 (age 43)

Sport
- Sport: Track and field
- Event(s): 200m, 300m, 400m
Medal record
Representing Jamaica
Women's athletics
World Indoor Championships
Silver medal – second place	2014 Sopot	4×400 m relay

Patricia Hall (born 16 October 1982) is a Jamaican sprinter. She competed in the 400 metres and the 4x400 metres relay events at the 2014 IAAF World Indoor Championships, winning a silver medal in the latter.

Hall competed for the Tennessee Volunteers track and field team in the NCAA.
