= 2008 NACAC Under-23 Championships in Athletics – Results =

These are the full results of the 2008 NACAC Under-23 Championships in Athletics which took place between July 18 and July 20, 2008, at Estadio Universitario Alberto Chivo Cordova in Toluca, Mexico.

== Men's results ==
=== 100 meters ===
Heats Wind: Heat 1: -0.6 m/s, Heat 2: -0.5 m/s, Heat 3: 0.0 m/s

Rank	Heat	Name	Nationality	Reaction time	Time	Notes
1	3	Sam Effah	Canada		10.34	Q
2	2	Cruz Rolando Palacios	Honduras		10.35	Q
3	1	James Samuels	United States		10.36	Q
4	3	Tyrell Cuffy	Cayman Islands		10.44	Q
5	2	Evander Wells	United States		10.51	Q
6	1	Jesse Saunders	Jamaica		10.56	Q
7	2	Shannon King	Canada		10.54	q
8	1	Ramon Gittens	Barbados		10.60	q
9	3	Gustavo Cuesta	Dominican Republic		10.71	
10	3	Jonathan Davis	Bahamas		10.80	
11	3	Pablo Jiménez	Mexico		10.80	
12	1	Rachmil Van Lamoen	Netherlands Antilles		10.83	
13	2	Ángel Marte	Dominican Republic		10.97	
14	2	Jorge Jiménez	Costa Rica		11.04	

Final
Wind: +0.3 m/s

Rank	Name	Nationality	Reaction time	Time	Notes
1st place, gold medalist(s)	James Samuels	United States		10.09	
2nd place, silver medalist(s)	Evander Wells	United States		10.15	
3rd place, bronze medalist(s)	Cruz Rolando Palacios	Honduras		10.22	
4	Sam Effah	Canada		10.31	
5	Ramon Gittens	Barbados		10.33	
6	Shannon King	Canada		10.34	
7	Jesse Saunders	Jamaica		10.39	
8	Tyrell Cuffy	Cayman Islands		10.40	

=== 200 meters ===
Heats Wind: Heat 1: -1.2 m/s, Heat 2: -1.7 m/s, Heat 3: -1.4 m/s

Rank	Heat	Name	Nationality	Reaction time	Time	Notes
1	2	Gavin Smellie	Canada	0.128	20.71	Q
2	1	Evander Wells	United States	0.153	20.90	Q
3	3	Sam Effah	Canada	0.149	20.99	Q
4	2	Tyrell Cuffy	Cayman Islands	0.176	20.99	Q
5	1	Cruz Rolando Palacios	Honduras	0.245	21.02	Q
6	3	Jonathan Davis	Bahamas	0.157	21.48	Q
7	1	Ramon Gittens	Barbados	0.176	21.18	q
8	2	Trey Harts	United States	0.188	21.27	q
9	2	Pablo Jiménez	Mexico	0.140	21.37	
10	3	Tabarie Henry	U.S. Virgin Islands	0.165	21.52	
11	3	Joel Hernández	Dominican Republic	0.152	21.53	
12	2	Ronson Small	Barbados	0.184	21.57	
13	1	Gustavo Cuesta	Dominican Republic	0.200	21.67	
14	3	José Carlos Herrera	Mexico	0.152	21.84	
15	2	Jorge Jiménez	Costa Rica	0.140	22.46	
16	2	Patrick Holwerda	Guatemala	0.211	22.55	
17	1	Terrence Agard	Netherlands Antilles	0.215	22.90	

Final
Wind: -0.9 m/s

Rank	Name	Nationality	Reaction time	Time	Notes
1st place, gold medalist(s)	Evander Wells	United States	0.133	20.34	
2nd place, silver medalist(s)	Cruz Rolando Palacios	Honduras	nt	20.40	
3rd place, bronze medalist(s)	Sam Effah	Canada	0.200	20.95	
4	Trey Harts	United States	0.440	21.39	
5	Jonathan Davis	Bahamas	0.137	21.78	
	Gavin Smellie	Canada	0.142	DNF	

=== 400 meters ===
Heats

Rank	Heat	Name	Nationality	Reaction time	Time	Notes
1	1	Lejerald Betters	United States		46.56	Q
2	2	Jamil Hubbard	United States		46.57	Q
3	2	Kelvin Herrera	Dominican Republic		46.64	Q
4	1	Tabarie Henry	U.S. Virgin Islands		46.77	Q
5	1	Michael Mason	Jamaica		46.84	Q
6	2	Adam Johnson	Canada		47.39	Q
7	2	Riker Hylton	Jamaica		47.47	q
8	1	Ramón Frias	Dominican Republic		47.49	q
9	1	Ramon Miller	Bahamas		48.78	
10	1	Erick García	Mexico		48.80	
11	2	Hans Villagrán	Guatemala		48.84	
12	2	Javier Carrasco	Mexico		49.03	
13	1	Charmant Ollivierre	Saint Vincent and the Grenadines		51.52	

Final

Rank	Name	Nationality	Reaction time	Time	Notes
1st place, gold medalist(s)	Lejerald Betters	United States	0.204	44.75	
2nd place, silver medalist(s)	Tabarie Henry	U.S. Virgin Islands	0.199	45.37	
3rd place, bronze medalist(s)	Jamil Hubbard	United States	0.197	45.96	
4	Riker Hylton	Jamaica	0.197	46.30	
5	Michael Mason	Jamaica	0.174	46.43	
6	Kelvin Herrera	Dominican Republic	0.184	46.65	
7	Ramón Frias	Dominican Republic	0.171	46.93	
8	Adam Johnson	Canada	0.196	48.45	

=== 800 meters ===
Heats

Rank	Heat	Name	Nationality	Time	Notes
1	1	Carlos Phillips	United States	1:49.71	Q
2	2	Rob Novak	United States	1:53.89	Q
3	1	Tayron Reyes	Dominican Republic	1:50.52	Q
4	2	Osbaldo Chávez	Mexico	1:54.59	Q
5	1	Terry Charles	U.S. Virgin Islands	1:50.90	Q
6	2	Andre Drummond	Jamaica	1:55.87	Q
7	1	Alberto González	Mexico	1:52.07	q
8	1	Scott Emberley	Canada	1:56.53	q
9	1	Camilo Quevedo	Guatemala	1:56.58	
10	2	Carlos Noe Álvarez	Guatemala	1:57.76	
11	2	Edwin Duval	Dominican Republic	1:58.97	
12	2	Hugo Céspedes	Costa Rica	2:04.23	

Final

Rank	Name	Nationality	Time	Notes
1st place, gold medalist(s)	Rob Novak	United States	1:50.22	
2nd place, silver medalist(s)	Tayron Reyes	Dominican Republic	1:50.31	
3rd place, bronze medalist(s)	Carlos Phillips	United States	1:50.51	
4	Andre Drummond	Jamaica	1:50.67	
5	Osbaldo Chávez	Mexico	1:51.03	
6	Alberto González	Mexico	1:51.75	
7	Scott Emberley	Canada	1:55.98	
	Terry Charles	U.S. Virgin Islands	DNF	

=== 1500 meters ===
Final

Rank	Name	Nationality	Time	Notes
1st place, gold medalist(s)	Josué Ramírez	Mexico	3:51.52	
2nd place, silver medalist(s)	Andrew Acosta	United States	3:52.17	
3rd place, bronze medalist(s)	Diego Borrego	Mexico	3:55.70	
4	Scott Emberley	Canada	3:56.19	
5	Carlos Noe Álvarez	Guatemala	4:09.74	
6	Jeff See	United States	4:11.21	
7	Edwin Duval	Dominican Republic	4:26.97	
8	Carlos Chavarría	Costa Rica	4:50.92	

=== 5000 meters ===
Final

Rank	Name	Nationality	Time	Notes
1st place, gold medalist(s)	José Mireles	Mexico	15:10.96	
2nd place, silver medalist(s)	Aldo Vega	Mexico	15:22.32	
3rd place, bronze medalist(s)	Estuardo Palacios	Guatemala	16:07.87	
4	Jeremias Saloj	Guatemala	16:31.68	

=== 10,000 meters ===
Final

Rank	Name	Nationality	Time	Notes
1st place, gold medalist(s)	Ismael Mondragón	Mexico	32:10.86	
2nd place, silver medalist(s)	Isaul Hernández	Mexico	32:34.51	
3rd place, bronze medalist(s)	Jeremias Saloj	Guatemala	33:49.30	
4	Deyner Sánchez	Costa Rica	37:52.62	

=== 3000 meters steeplechase ===
Final

Rank	Name	Nationality	Time	Notes
1st place, gold medalist(s)	Josafat González	Mexico	9:15.04	
2nd place, silver medalist(s)	Kyle Heath	United States	9:24.52	
3rd place, bronze medalist(s)	Aarón Arias	Mexico	9:38.82	
4	Henry Miller	United States	10:59.14	
	Alex Genest	Canada	DNF	

=== 110 meters hurdles ===
Final
Wind: -1.0 m/s

Rank	Name	Nationality	Reaction time	Time	Notes
1st place, gold medalist(s)	Jason Richardson	United States	0.204	13.32	
2nd place, silver medalist(s)	Ryan Brathwaite	Barbados	0.168	13.50	
3rd place, bronze medalist(s)	Ronnie Ash	United States	0.236	13.72	
4	Kallinka Pitt	Jamaica	0.167	14.04	
5	Ramón Sosa	Dominican Republic	0.162	15.11	
6	Alberto Cabanillas	Mexico	0.209	15.17	
7	Leonel Villagómez	Mexico	0.178	16.14	

=== 400 meters hurdles ===
Final

Rank	Name	Nationality	Reaction time	Time	Notes
1st place, gold medalist(s)	Justin Gaymon	United States	0.203	49.50	
2nd place, silver medalist(s)	Nicholas Robinson	United States	0.192	50.74	
3rd place, bronze medalist(s)	Camilo Quevedo	Guatemala	0.186	51.92	
4	Allan Ayala	Guatemala	0.214	52.05	
5	José Luis Cevallos	Mexico	0.204	52.28	
6	Ronald Severino	Dominican Republic	0.232	53.61	
7	Rowan Gooden	Jamaica	0.232	53.91	
8	Omar González	Mexico	0.175	55.58	

=== High jump ===
Final

Rank	Name	Nationality	Result	Notes
1st place, gold medalist(s)	Joe Kindred	United States	2.27m	
2nd place, silver medalist(s)	Darvin Edwards	Saint Lucia	2.23m	
3rd place, bronze medalist(s)	Jamal Wilson	Bahamas	2.23m	
4	Jorge Rouco	Mexico	2.13m	
5	Scott Sellers	United States	2.10m	
6	Daniel Mondragón	Mexico	2.00m	
7	Perry Anglin	Cayman Islands	2.00m	
	David Edwards	Jamaica	NM	

=== Pole vault ===
Final

Rank	Name	Nationality	Attempts														Result	Notes
Rank	Name	Nationality	3.70	3.80	3.90	4.50	4.60	4.70	4.80	4.95	5.00	5.10	5.20	5.35	5.50	5.61	Result	Notes
1st place, gold medalist(s)	Jordan Scott	United States	-	-	-	-	-	-	-	-	xo	o	o	xo	xo	xxx	5.50m	
2nd place, silver medalist(s)	Paul Greeley	United States	-	-	-	-	-	-	-	-	xo	o	xo	xxx			5.20m	
3rd place, bronze medalist(s)	Taylor Petrucha	Canada	-	-	-	-	o	-	o	xo	-	o	xxx				5.10m	
4	Moises Gómez	Mexico	-	-	-	o	-	xxx									4.50m	
5	Gamalier Semeis	Dominican Republic	o	o	xxx												3.80m	
	José Montaño	Mexico	-	-	-	-	-	-	xxx								NH	

=== Long jump ===
Final

Rank	Name	Nationality	Attempts						Result	Notes
Rank	Name	Nationality	1	2	3	4	5	6	Result	Notes
1st place, gold medalist(s)	Matt Turner	United States	x	x	7.92m (NWI)	7.96m (NWI)	7.92m (NWI)	7.92m (NWI)	7.96m (NWI)	
2nd place, silver medalist(s)	Andre Black	United States	7.71m (NWI)	x	7.61m (NWI)	7.59m (NWI)	7.44m (NWI)	7.83m (NWI)	7.83m (NWI)	
3rd place, bronze medalist(s)	Carlos Rafael Jorge	Dominican Republic	7.61m (NWI)	5.63m (NWI)	7.37m (NWI)	7.59m (NWI)	7.61m (NWI)	7.40m (NWI)	7.61m (NWI)	
4	Carl Morgan	Cayman Islands	x	x	7.46m (NWI)	x	x	7.44m (NWI)	7.46m (NWI)	
5	Arturo Bustamante	Mexico	7.06m (NWI)	7.17m (NWI)	7.26m (NWI)	7.01m (NWI)	7.23m (NWI)	7.36m (NWI)	7.36m (NWI)	
6	Carlos Morgan	Cayman Islands	7.26m (NWI)	x	7.21m (NWI)	x	x	7.13m (NWI)	7.26m (NWI)	
7	Leon Hunt	U.S. Virgin Islands	6.95m (NWI)	6.72m (NWI)	x	6.87m (NWI)	7.07m (NWI)	x	7.07m (NWI)	
8	Calvert Chiverton	Saint Kitts and Nevis	6.99m (NWI)	x	x	6.70m (NWI)	6.97m (NWI)	7.01m (NWI)	7.01m (NWI)	
9	Rudon Bastian	Bahamas	x	x	6.92m (NWI)				6.92m (NWI)	
10	Lenniel Warner	Saint Kitts and Nevis	6.75m (NWI)	x	6.59m (NWI)				6.75m (NWI)	
11	Marvin García	Guatemala	6.37m (NWI)	x	x				6.37m (NWI)	
12	Kessel Carson	Honduras	x	x	6.23m (NWI)				6.23m (NWI)	

=== Triple jump ===
Final

Rank	Name	Nationality	Result	Notes
1st place, gold medalist(s)	Andre Black	United States	15.91m (+1.2 m/s)	
2nd place, silver medalist(s)	Nkosinza Balambu	United States	15.78m (-1.8 m/s)	
3rd place, bronze medalist(s)	Carl Morgan	Cayman Islands	15.76m (+0.9 m/s)	
4	Jair Cadenas	Mexico	15.39m (+0.0 m/s)	
5	Antillio Bastian	Bahamas	15.38m (+0.0 m/s)	
6	Lamar Delaney	Bahamas	15.21m (+1.0 m/s)	
7	Marvin García	Guatemala	14.66m (+1.1 m/s)	
8	Iván Galván	Mexico	13.97m (+0.0 m/s)	
9	Leon Hunt	U.S. Virgin Islands	13.64m (+0.0 m/s)	

=== Shot put ===
Final

Rank	Name	Nationality	Attempts						Result	Notes
Rank	Name	Nationality	1	2	3	4	5	6	Result	Notes
1st place, gold medalist(s)	Ryan Whiting	United States	18.30m	18.40m	18.73m	x	x	19.46m	19.46m	
2nd place, silver medalist(s)	John Hickey	United States	17.97m	17.75m	17.34m	x	17.71m	x	17.97m	
3rd place, bronze medalist(s)	Raymond Brown	Jamaica	16.41m	16.46m	16.95m	16.71m	16.95m	16.87m	16.95m	
4	Aarón Valadéz	Mexico	14.26m	x	x	15.62m	16.79m	16.55m	16.79m	
5	Mario Ramos	Mexico	15.81m	15.44m	15.86m	15.68m	16.07m	15.45m	16.07m	

=== Discus throw ===
Final

Rank	Name	Nationality	Attempts						Result	Notes
Rank	Name	Nationality	1	2	3	4	5	6	Result	Notes
1st place, gold medalist(s)	Matt Lamb	United States	57.56m	56.89m	58.70m	58.24m	57.16m	x	58.70m	
2nd place, silver medalist(s)	Ryan Whiting	United States	49.37m	x	52.90m	x	53.47m	x	53.47m	
3rd place, bronze medalist(s)	Adonson Shallow	Saint Vincent and the Grenadines	49.94m	x	48.92m	x	50.91m	49.39m	50.91m	
4	Jesús Barragán	Mexico	40.91m	x	x	x	45.17m	43.78m	45.17m	

=== Hammer throw ===
Final

Rank	Name	Nationality	Attempts						Result	Notes
Rank	Name	Nationality	1	2	3	4	5	6	Result	Notes
1st place, gold medalist(s)	Sean Steacy	Canada	61.17m	63.44m	61.66m	62.87m	65.30m	62.23m	65.30m	
2nd place, silver medalist(s)	John Freeman	United States	60.78m	x	x	x	63.70m	61.80m	63.70m	
3rd place, bronze medalist(s)	Matt Wauters	United States	57.54m	57.71m	58.56m	58.73m	58.06m	59.61m	59.61m	
4	Castulo Gamboa	Mexico	x	53.16m	54.53m	55.14m	54.84m	50.89m	55.14m	
5	Javier Villarreal	Mexico	x	x	x	52.32m	49.73m	x	52.32m	
	Brad Millar	Canada	x	x	x	x	x	x	NM	

=== Javelin throw ===
Final

Rank	Name	Nationality	Attempts						Result	Notes
Rank	Name	Nationality	1	2	3	4	5	6	Result	Notes
1st place, gold medalist(s)	Chris Hill	United States	64.22m	72.80m	69.79m	72.77m	73.71m	80.51m	80.51m	
2nd place, silver medalist(s)	Corey White	United States	73.06m	70.08m	72.56m	67.32m	78.52m	77.04m	78.52m	
3rd place, bronze medalist(s)	Juan José Méndez	Mexico	58.52m	63.89m	61.83m	65.34m	64.83m	69.67m	69.67m	
4	Albert Reynolas	Saint Lucia	x	59.44m	64.27m	58.61m	x	60.53m	64.27m	

=== Decathlon ===
Final

Rank	Name	Nationality	100m	LJ	SP	HJ	400m	110m H	DT	PV	JT	1500m	Points	Notes
1st place, gold medalist(s)	Raven Cepeda	United States	11.00 (-1.4); 861pts	6.96m (NWI); 804pts	13.70m 710pts	1.94m 749pts	50.67; 784pts	14.57 (-0.1); 902pts	39.75m 659pts	5.00m 910pts	49.33m 579pts	5:02.34; 546pts	7504	
2nd place, silver medalist(s)	Nick Adcock	United States	11.10 (-1.4); 838pts	7.14m (NWI); 847pts	13.29m 685pts	2.12m 915pts	49.41; 842pts	14.63 (-0.1); 895pts	32.85m 521pts	4.30m 702pts	55.29m 667pts	5:21.49; 442pts	7354	
3rd place, bronze medalist(s)	Reid Gustafson	Canada	11.39 (-1.4); 776pts	6.98m (NWI); 809pts	12.27m 623pts	1.94m 749pts	49.91; 819pts	16.14 (-0.1); 717pts	33.21m 528pts	4.30m 702pts	60.13m 740pts	5:11.36; 496pts	6959	
4	Darwin Colón	Honduras	10.95 (-1.4); 872pts	7.03m (NWI); 821pts	12.90m 661pts	1.94m 749pts	53.43; 663pts	15.09 (-0.1); 839pts	42.60m 718pts	3.40m 457pts	42.70m 481pts	5:52.74; 294pts	6555	
5	Rodrigo Sagaón	Mexico	11.18 (-1.4); 821pts	5.77m (NWI); 537pts	11.28m 563pts	1.73m 569pts	49.81; 823pts	16.49 (-0.1); 679pts	32.99m 524pts	3.30m 431pts	48.09m 560pts	4:56.65; 579pts	6086	
6	Gamalier Semeis	Dominican Republic	11.75 (-1.4); 701pts	6.21m (NWI); 632pts	12.04m 609pts	1.91m 723pts	57.22; 513pts	17.16 (-0.1); 608pts	34.93m 562pts	4.10m 645pts	47.41m 550pts	DNF; 0pts	5543	
	Alexander Evans	Belize	13.19 (-1.4); 436pts	5.27m (NWI); 435pts	10.44m 512pts	1.73m 569pts	DNF; 0pts	DNF; 0pts	28.54m 436pts				DNF	

=== 20,000 meters walk ===
Final

Rank	Name	Nationality	Time	Notes
1st place, gold medalist(s)	Eder Sánchez	Mexico	1:30:46.78	
2nd place, silver medalist(s)	David Mejía	Mexico	1:31:41.19	
3rd place, bronze medalist(s)	Aníbal Paau	Guatemala	1:35:38.20	
4	Inaki Gomez	Canada	1:36:08.82	
5	Jared Swehosky	United States	1:44:58.85	
	Chris Teigtmeier	United States	DNF	

=== 4x100 meters relay ===
Final

Rank	Nation	Competitors	Reaction time	Time	Notes
1st place, gold medalist(s)	United States	Jeremy Hall; Teddy Williams; Christopher Dykes; James Samuels	0.149	38.39	
2nd place, silver medalist(s)	Canada	Shannon King; Adam Johnson; Gavin Smellie; Sam Effah	0.150	39.31	
3rd place, bronze medalist(s)	Cayman Islands	Adolphus Rhymiech; Tyrell Cuffy; Carl Morgan; Carlos Morgan	0.177	39.68	
4	Jamaica	Tarik Edwards; Riker Hylton; Theo Bennett; Jesse Saunders	0.138	39.95	
5	Dominican Republic	Ángel Marte; Gustavo Cuesta; Joel Hernández; Carlos Rafael Jorge	0.178	40.87	
6	Mexico	Pablo Jiménez; José Carlos Herrera; Marco Antonio Pacheco; Arturo Bustamante	0.158	40.94	

=== 4x400 meters relay ===
Final

Rank	Nation	Competitors	Reaction time	Time	Notes
1st place, gold medalist(s)	Jamaica	Riker Hylton; Theo Bennett; Michael Mason; Tarik Edwards	0.201	3:05.61	
2nd place, silver medalist(s)	Dominican Republic	Kelvin Herrera; Tayron Reyes; Joel Hernández; Ramón Frias	0.214	3:05.80	
3rd place, bronze medalist(s)	Mexico	Javier Carrasco; Erick García; Osbaldo Chávez; Víctor Gómez	0.196	3:13.83	
4	Guatemala	Hans Villagrán; Patrick Holwerda; Allan Ayala; Camilo Quevedo	0.289	3:13.83	
5	United States	Jamil Hubbard; Justin Gaymon; Lejerald Betters; Quentin Iglehart-Summers	0.249	3:18.56	

== Women's results ==
=== 100 meters ===
Heats Wind: Heat 1: +0.6 m/s, Heat 2: +0.9 m/s

Rank	Heat	Name	Nationality	Reaction time	Time	Notes
1	1	Schillonie Calvert	Jamaica		11.41	Q
2	2	Tawanna Meadows	United States		11.43	Q
3	1	Scottesha Miller	United States		11.53	Q
4	2	Samantha Henry	Jamaica		11.61	Q
5	1	Barbara Pierre	Haiti		11.58	Q
6	2	Shakera Reece	Barbados		11.63	Q
7	1	Mariely Sánchez	Dominican Republic		11.78	q
8	1	Genevieve Thibault	Canada		11.84	q
9	2	Liann Kellman	Barbados		12.14	
10	1	Wendy Reynoso	Dominican Republic		12.20	
11	2	Kaina Martinez	Belize		12.31	

Final
Wind: +0.3 m/s

Rank	Name	Nationality	Reaction time	Time	Notes
1st place, gold medalist(s)	Schillonie Calvert	Jamaica		11.24	
2nd place, silver medalist(s)	Tawanna Meadows	United States		11.36	
3rd place, bronze medalist(s)	Samantha Henry	Jamaica		11.39	
4	Barbara Pierre	Haiti		11.45	
5	Scottesha Miller	United States		11.47	
6	Shakera Reece	Barbados		11.60	
7	Genevieve Thibault	Canada		11.66	
8	Mariely Sánchez	Dominican Republic		11.75	

=== 200 meters ===
Heats Wind: Heat 1: -0.7 m/s, Heat 2: +0.5 m/s

Rank	Heat	Name	Nationality	Reaction time	Time	Notes
1	1	Schillonie Calvert	Jamaica	0.222	23.31	Q
2	2	Leslie Cole	United States	0.224	23.75	Q
3	1	Mariely Sánchez	Dominican Republic	0.173	23.68	Q
4	2	Amonn Nelson	Canada	0.173	23.78	Q
5	1	Scottesha Miller	United States	0.175	23.69	Q
6	2	Shakera Reece	Barbados	0.200	24.14	Q
7	1	Liann Kellman	Barbados	0.188	24.33	q
8	2	Mariana Rodríguez	Mexico	0.271	25.87	q
	1	Diana Taylor	Dominican Republic	0.240	DNF	

Final
Wind: -1.2 m/s

Rank	Name	Nationality	Reaction time	Time	Notes
1st place, gold medalist(s)	Leslie Cole	United States	0.204	22.92	
2nd place, silver medalist(s)	Schillonie Calvert	Jamaica	0.192	23.33	
3rd place, bronze medalist(s)	Mariely Sánchez	Dominican Republic	0.190	23.50	
4	Amonn Nelson	Canada	0.218	23.67	
5	Shakera Reece	Barbados	nt	24.07	
6	Liann Kellman	Barbados	0.155	24.66	

=== 400 meters ===
Heats

Rank	Heat	Name	Nationality	Reaction time	Time	Notes
1	1	Anastasia Le-Roy	Jamaica		53.07	Q
2	2	Bobby-Gaye Wilkins	Jamaica		53.17	Q
3	1	Nayeli Vela	Mexico		53.24	Q
4	2	Jenna Martin	Canada		53.51	Q
5	1	Kineke Alexander	Saint Vincent and the Grenadines		53.50	Q
6	2	María Teresa Rugueiro	Mexico		53.99	Q
7	1	Francena McCorory	United States		53.51	q
8	2	Brandi Cross	United States		54.35	q
9	2	Raysa Sánchez	Dominican Republic		56.81	
10	1	Samaria del Rosario	Dominican Republic		57.09	

Final

Rank	Name	Nationality	Reaction time	Time	Notes
1st place, gold medalist(s)	Bobby-Gaye Wilkins	Jamaica	0.223	51.34	
2nd place, silver medalist(s)	Anastasia Le-Roy	Jamaica	0.201	52.21	
3rd place, bronze medalist(s)	Jenna Martin	Canada	0.185	52.45	
4	Brandi Cross	United States	0.166	52.68	
5	Nayeli Vela	Mexico	0.276	53.08	
6	Kineke Alexander	Saint Vincent and the Grenadines	0.217	53.22	
7	María Teresa Rugueiro	Mexico	0.186	53.57	

=== 800 meters ===
Final

Rank	Name	Nationality	Time	Notes
1st place, gold medalist(s)	Geena Gall	United States	2:10.32	
2nd place, silver medalist(s)	Ogbasilassie Lemlem	Canada	2:10.64	
3rd place, bronze medalist(s)	Cristina Guevara	Mexico	2:10.93	
4	Patrícia Oaxaca	Mexico	2:16.78	
5	Deyanira Díaz	Dominican Republic	2:17.40	
6	Anecia Williams	U.S. Virgin Islands	2:23.52	

=== 1500 meters ===
Final

Rank	Name	Nationality	Time	Notes
1st place, gold medalist(s)	Nicole Edwards	Canada	4:36.27	
2nd place, silver medalist(s)	Lauren Hagens	United States	4:36.50	
3rd place, bronze medalist(s)	Anayeli Navarro	Mexico	4:48.86	

=== 5000 meters ===
Final

Rank	Name	Nationality	Time	Notes
1st place, gold medalist(s)	Gwen Jorgensen	United States	18:04.56	

=== 10,000 meters ===
Final

Rank	Name	Nationality	Time	Notes
1st place, gold medalist(s)	Meghan Armstrong	United States	37:31.28	
2nd place, silver medalist(s)	Morgan Haws	United States	37:33.42	

=== 3000 meters steeplechase ===
Final

Rank	Name	Nationality	Time	Notes
1st place, gold medalist(s)	Nicole Bush	United States	10:42.17	
2nd place, silver medalist(s)	Bridget Franek	United States	11:12.65	
3rd place, bronze medalist(s)	Carolyn Ellis	Canada	11:49.78	
4	Ana Rosa Murillo	Mexico	12:25.92	
	Kathia García	Mexico	DNF	

=== 100 meters hurdles ===
Final
Wind: -0.6 m/s

Rank	Name	Nationality	Reaction time	Time	Notes
1st place, gold medalist(s)	Tiffany Ofili	United States	0.146	12.82	
2nd place, silver medalist(s)	Kristi Castlin	United States	0.198	13.21	
3rd place, bronze medalist(s)	Latoya Greaves	Jamaica	0.186	13.51	
4	Jeimy Bernárdez	Honduras	0.161	13.83	
5	Carla Rodríguez	Mexico	0.171	14.13	
6	Diana Morette	Mexico	0.153	14.28	

=== 400 meters hurdles ===
Final

Rank	Name	Nationality	Reaction time	Time	Notes
1st place, gold medalist(s)	Nickiesha Wilson	Jamaica	0.388	55.78	
2nd place, silver medalist(s)	Nicole Leach	United States	0.284	57.05	
3rd place, bronze medalist(s)	Yolanda Osana	Dominican Republic	0.256	58.74	
4	Danielle Brown	United States	0.281	59.75	
5	Karla Saviñón	Mexico	0.242	59.98	
6	Carla Rodríguez	Mexico	0.348	1:03.62	
7	Judith Riley	Jamaica	0.297	1:06.34	

=== High jump ===
Final

Rank	Name	Nationality	Attempts								Result	Notes
Rank	Name	Nationality	1.60	1.65	1.70	1.73	1.76	1.79	1.82	1.85	Result	Notes
1st place, gold medalist(s)	Jillian Drouin	Canada	-	-	-	-	o	-	-	xo	1.85m	
2nd place, silver medalist(s)	Rebecca Christensen	United States	-	-	-	o	-	o	o	xxx	1.82m	
3rd place, bronze medalist(s)	Fabiola Ayala	Mexico	-	-	o	o	xo	o			1.79m	
4	Alejandra Gómez	Costa Rica	o	o	o	o	xxo	xxx			1.76m	
5	Paola Fuentes	Mexico	-	-	xo	o	xxo	xxx			1.76m	

=== Pole vault ===
Final

Rank	Name	Nationality	Attempts													Result	Notes
Rank	Name	Nationality	3.20	3.30	3.40	3.50	3.60	3.70	3.80	3.90	4.00	4.10	4.25	4.35	4.40	Result	Notes
1st place, gold medalist(s)	Katie Stripling	United States	-	-	-	-	-	o	o	o	o	o	xo	xo	xxx	4.35m	
2nd place, silver medalist(s)	Heather Hamilton	Canada	-	-	-	-	-	o	o	o	xo	xxx				4.00m	
3rd place, bronze medalist(s)	Leah Vause	Canada	-	-	-	-	-	-	xxo	o	xo	xxx				4.00m	
4	Carmelita Correa	Mexico	-	-	xo	o	o	xxx								3.60m	
5	Pamela Villagómez	Mexico	o	xxx												3.20m	
	Stephanie Bagan	United States	-	-	-	-	-	xxx								NH	

=== Long jump ===
Final

Rank	Name	Nationality	Attempts						Result	Notes
Rank	Name	Nationality	1	2	3	4	5	6	Result	Notes
1st place, gold medalist(s)	Joemi Maduka	United States	6.27m (NWI)	x	6.50m (NWI)	6.41m (NWI)	6.24m (NWI)	6.66m (NWI)	6.66m (NWI)	
2nd place, silver medalist(s)	Natasha Harvey	United States	6.54m (NWI)	6.29m (NWI)	6.14m (NWI)	6.13m (NWI)	x	6.56m (NWI)	6.56m (NWI)	
3rd place, bronze medalist(s)	Bianca Stuart	Bahamas	6.37m (NWI)	6.32m (NWI)	4.57m (NWI)	6.12m (NWI)	x	x	6.37m (NWI)	
4	Shara Proctor	Anguilla	6.16m (NWI)	6.19m (NWI)	x	6.23m (NWI)	6.16m (NWI)	6.11m (NWI)	6.23m (NWI)	
5	Fanny Chalas	Dominican Republic	5.29m (NWI)	5.52m (NWI)	x	x	5.48m (NWI)	x	5.52m (NWI)	
6	Yesenia Villarreal	Mexico	4.92m (NWI)	5.31m (NWI)	5.46m (NWI)	5.38m (NWI)	5.52m (NWI)	5.24m (NWI)	5.52m (NWI)	
7	Alejandra Curiel	Mexico	x	5.33m (NWI)	5.41m (NWI)	x	5.28m (NWI)	x	5.41m (NWI)	
8	Kaina Martinez	Belize	x	x	5.02m (NWI)	5.16m (NWI)	x	x	5.16m (NWI)	

=== Triple jump ===
Final

Rank	Name	Nationality	Attempts						Result	Notes
Rank	Name	Nationality	1	2	3	4	5	6	Result	Notes
1st place, gold medalist(s)	Crystal Manning	United States	13.52m (NWI)	x	x	13.52m (NWI)			13.52m (NWI)	
2nd place, silver medalist(s)	Tamara Highsmith	United States	13.07m (NWI)	12.80m (NWI)	12.79m (NWI)	x	x	13.11m (NWI)	13.11m (NWI)	
3rd place, bronze medalist(s)	Shara Proctor	Anguilla	13.04m (NWI)	13.01m (NWI)	12.90m (NWI)	13.11m (NWI)	12.95m (NWI)	12.66m (NWI)	13.11m (NWI)	
4	Yesenia Villarreal	Mexico	x	12.14m (NWI)	12.49m (NWI)	12.44m (NWI)	12.23m (NWI)	12.40m (NWI)	12.49m (NWI)	
5	Jacqueline Triana	Mexico	11.82m (NWI)	12.02m (NWI)	12.31m (NWI)	12.34m (NWI)	x	12.00m (NWI)	12.34m (NWI)	
6	Oneida Valerio	Dominican Republic	12.06m (NWI)	12.27m (NWI)	12.24m (NWI)	11.79m (NWI)	11.90m (NWI)	12.27m (NWI)	12.27m (NWI)	
7	Kay-De Vaughn	Belize	11.65m (NWI)	11.49m (NWI)	x	11.36m (NWI)	x		11.65m (NWI)	
8	Sharon Ruíz	Costa Rica	11.41m (NWI)	11.56m (NWI)	11.28m (NWI)	11.34m (NWI)	11.36m (NWI)	11.31m (NWI)	11.56m (NWI)	

=== Shot put ===
Final

Rank	Name	Nationality	Attempts						Result	Notes
Rank	Name	Nationality	1	2	3	4	5	6	Result	Notes
1st place, gold medalist(s)	Sara Stevens	United States	15.15m	x	15.96m	x	15.50m	16.04m	16.04m	
2nd place, silver medalist(s)	Keisha Walkes	Barbados	14.18m	14.84m	15.88m	15.98m	15.49m	15.46m	15.98m	
3rd place, bronze medalist(s)	Aja Evans	United States	15.34m	15.17m	15.10m	15.16m	15.16m	15.10m	15.34m	
4	Laura Pulido	Mexico	10.61m	12.23m	13.38m	x	12.71m	13.22m	13.38m	
5	Irais Estrada	Mexico	12.59m	12.04m	12.10m	x	12.52m	11.82m	12.59m	
6	Fresa Núñez	Dominican Republic	x	10.97m	10.86m	11.30m	11.16m	11.28m	11.30m	
7	Kandice Vaughn	Belize	x	10.74m	x	10.84m	11.08m	x	11.08m	

=== Discus throw ===
Final

Rank	Name	Nationality	Attempts						Result	Notes
Rank	Name	Nationality	1	2	3	4	5	6	Result	Notes
1st place, gold medalist(s)	D'Andra Carter	United States	50.33m	52.92m	x	50.69m	49.59m	51.85m	52.92m	
2nd place, silver medalist(s)	Annie Hess	United States	45.78m	x	51.12m	x	52.13m	51.51m	52.13m	
3rd place, bronze medalist(s)	Irais Estrada	Mexico	x	42.00m	45.89m	44.89m	46.02m	x	46.02m	

=== Hammer throw ===
Final

Rank	Name	Nationality	Attempts						Result	Notes
Rank	Name	Nationality	1	2	3	4	5	6	Result	Notes
1st place, gold medalist(s)	Sara Stevens	United States	59.96m	62.46m	59.34m	61.35m	62.79m		62.79m	
2nd place, silver medalist(s)	Loren Groves	United States	61.45m	60.67m	60.08m	x	54.92m	61.45m	61.45m	
3rd place, bronze medalist(s)	Aline Huerta	Mexico	52.77m	x	x	x	x	x	52.77m	
4	Ana García	Mexico	45.94m	43.13m	x	44.57m	44.35m	x	45.94m	

=== Javelin throw ===
Final

Rank	Name	Nationality	Attempts						Result	Notes
Rank	Name	Nationality	1	2	3	4	5	6	Result	Notes
1st place, gold medalist(s)	Elizabeth Gleadle	Canada	45.91m	51.76m	48.02m	47.20m	45.87m	40.46m	51.76m	
2nd place, silver medalist(s)	Ruby Radocaj	United States	50.66m	50.72m	45.72m	x	46.59m	50.08m	50.72m	
3rd place, bronze medalist(s)	Katie Coronado	United States	48.26m	48.36m	46.13m	46.93m	47.48m	49.41m	49.41m	
4	Fresa Núñez	Dominican Republic	x	47.60m	43.61m	44.70m	48.18m	x	48.18m	
5	Ana Encinas	Mexico	47.37m	45.35m	46.35m	43.21m	44.11m	41.77m	47.37m	
6	Taneisha Blair	Jamaica	x	43.90m	43.33m	44.50m	x	38.85m	44.50m	

=== Heptathlon ===
Final

Rank	Name	Nationality	100m H	HJ	SP	200m	LJ	JT	800m	Points	Notes
1st place, gold medalist(s)	Jillian Drouin	Canada	13.80 (0.7); 1007pts	1.87m 1067pts	12.38m 686pts	25.08 (0.2); 879pts	6.07m (NWI); 871pts	37.19m 613pts	2:38.40; 591pts	5714	
2nd place, silver medalist(s)	Bettie Wade	United States	13.81 (0.7); 1005pts	1.75m 916pts	12.38m 686pts	24.85 (0.2); 901pts	5.77m (NWI); 780pts	32.40m 522pts	2:29.33; 701pts	5511	
3rd place, bronze medalist(s)	Marissa Harris	United States	13.63 (0.7); 1031pts	1.69m 842pts	11.12m 603pts	24.38 (0.2); 945pts	5.99m (NWI); 846pts	34.81m 568pts	2:31.48; 674pts	5509	
4	Tamilee Kerr	Jamaica	14.65 (0.7); 888pts	1.63m 771pts	10.64m 571pts	25.63 (0.2); 830pts	5.96m (NWI); 837pts	45.27m 769pts	2:27.26; 728pts	5394	
5	Alecia Beckford-Stewart	Canada	14.62 (0.7); 892pts	1.63m 771pts	11.70m 641pts	25.72 (0.2); 822pts	5.52m (NWI); 706pts	36.16m 594pts	3:00.02; 365pts	4791	
6	Cinthia Gómez	Mexico	15.42 (0.7); 787pts	1.63m 771pts	7.74m 383pts	27.30 (0.2); 687pts	4.93m (NWI); 540pts	22.55m 336pts	2:28.72; 709pts	4213	
7	Flor Morales	Mexico	15.51 (0.7); 775pts	1.54m 666pts	9.42m 492pts	28.58 (0.2); 586pts	4.76m (NWI); 495pts	33.77m 548pts	2:34.39; 639pts	4201	

=== 10,000 meters walk ===
Final

Rank	Name	Nationality	Time	Notes
1st place, gold medalist(s)	María de la Luz Pérez	Mexico	49:50.63	
2nd place, silver medalist(s)	Tatiana González	Mexico	49:57.22	
3rd place, bronze medalist(s)	Le'erin Voss	United States	55:39.66	
4	Christina Peters	United States	59:37.58	
5	María Fernanda Arias	Costa Rica	1:04:40.30	

=== 4x100 meters relay ===
Final

Rank	Nation	Competitors	Reaction time	Time	Notes
1st place, gold medalist(s)	United States	Jessica Onyepunuka; Tawanna Meadows; Lynne Layne; Scottesha Miller	0.220	43.64	
2nd place, silver medalist(s)	Jamaica	Samantha Henry; Latoya Greaves; Schillonie Calvert; Anastasia Le-Roy	0.183	43.73	
3rd place, bronze medalist(s)	Dominican Republic	Fanny Chalas; Yolanda Osana; Wendy Reynoso; Mariely Sánchez	0.197	46.23	
4	Mexico	Yesenia Villarreal; Diana Morette; Mariana Rodríguez; Carla Rodríguez	0.172	48.25	

=== 4x400 meters relay ===
Final

Rank	Nation	Competitors	Reaction time	Time	Notes
1st place, gold medalist(s)	Jamaica	Christine Day; Bobby-Gaye Wilkins; Anastasia Le-Roy; Nickiesha Wilson	0.201	3:27.46	
2nd place, silver medalist(s)	United States	Brandi Cross; Kenyatta Coleman; Danielle Brown; Nicole Leach	0.226	3:28.25	
3rd place, bronze medalist(s)	Canada	Jenna Martin; Nicole Edwards; Ogbasilassie Lemlem; Amonn Nelson	0.254	3:35.26	
4	Mexico	Nayeli Vela; María Teresa Rugueiro; Cristina Guevara; Karla Saviñón	0.265	3:36.41	
5	Dominican Republic	Samaria del Rosario; Alicia Zapata; Raysa Sánchez; Yolanda Osana	0.267	3:50.97	
