= Carmelita Correa =

Mexican pole vaulter

Personal information
- Full name: Carmelita Viridiana Correa Silva
- Born: 5 December 1988 (age 37) Tonalá, Chiapas, Mexico
- Height: 1.70 m (5 ft 7 in)
- Weight: 56 kg (123 lb)

Sport
- Country: Mexico
- Sport: Athletics
- Event: Pole vault
Medal record
Women's athletics
Representing Mexico
CAC Championships
Gold medal – first place	2013 Morelia	Pole vault
- Updated on 7 January 2015

Carmelita Viridiana Correa Silva (born 5 December 1988) is a Mexican track and field athlete who competes in the pole vault. She is the Mexican record holder with her best of 4.18 metres and was the gold medallist at the Central American and Caribbean Championships in Athletics in 2013.

Born in Tonalá, Chiapas, she won her first international medal as a junior athlete, placing second at the 2006 Central American and Caribbean Junior Championships. She followed this with eighth place at the 2007 Pan American Junior Athletics Championships. In her first year of competing as a senior in 2008 she set a best of 3.95 metres and placed fourth at the 2008 NACAC Under-23 Championships in Athletics, held in Toluca. A Mexican record vault of 4.18 m came at the Olimpiada Nacional.

She made her senior international debut in 2011 and placed fifth at the 2011 Central American and Caribbean Championships in Athletics and tenth at the Pan American Games in Guadalajara. An appearance at the 2012 Ibero-American Championships in Athletics saw her finish seventh. She won her first major medal in her native Mexico at the 2013 Central American and Caribbean Championships in Athletics with a gold medal-winning vault of 3.95 m.

== Personal best ==
Event	Result	Venue	Date
Pole vault	4.18 m	Hermosillo, Mexico	1 June 2009

== Achievements ==
Year	Competition	Venue	Position	Event	Notes
Representing Mexico
2006	Central American and Caribbean Junior Championships (U20)	Port of Spain, Trinidad and Tobago	2nd	Pole vault	3.20 m
2007	Pan American Junior Championships	São Paulo, Brazil	8th	Pole vault	3.40 m
2008	NACAC U-23 Championships	Toluca, Mexico	4th	Pole vault	3.60 m A
2011	Central American and Caribbean Championships	Mayagüez, Puerto Rico	5th	Pole vault	3.70 m
2011	Pan American Games	Guadalajara, Mexico	10th	Pole vault	3.85 m A
2012	Ibero-American Championships	Barquisimeto, Venezuela	7th	Pole vault	3.80 m
2013	Central American and Caribbean Championships	Morelia, Mexico	1st	Pole vault	3.95 m A
2014	Central American and Caribbean Games	Xalapa, Mexico	6th	Pole vault	3.75 m A
2015	NACAC Championships	San José, Costa Rica	4th	Pole vault	4.20 m
2018	Central American and Caribbean Games	Barranquilla, Colombia	–	Pole vault	NM
