= Mariely Sánchez =

Dominican Republic sprinter

Personal information
- Full name: Mariely Sánchez Hichez
- Born: December 30, 1988 (age 37)
- Height: 1.65 m (5 ft 5 in)
- Weight: 58 kg (128 lb)
Medal record
Women's athletics
Representing Dominican Republic
Pan American Games
| Bronze medal – third place | 2011 Guadalajara | 200 m |
Ibero-American Championships
| Silver medal – second place | 2012 Barquisimeto | 4×100 m relay |
| Bronze medal – third place | 2012 Barquisimeto | 200 m |
NACAC Under-23 Championships
| Bronze medal – third place | 2008 Toluca | 200m |
| Bronze medal – third place | 2008 Toluca | 4×100 m relay |

Mariely Sánchez Hichez (born December 30, 1988) is a Dominican Republic sprinter from Santo Domingo. She won a bronze medal in the 200 meters at the 2011 Pan American Games. At the 2012 Summer Olympics, Sánchez also competed in the Women's 200 meters.

Sánchez holds the 100 meters Dominican record.

== International competitions ==
Representing Dominican Republic
| Year | Competition | Venue | Position | Event | Time |
|---|---|---|---|---|---|
| 2007 | Pan American Junior Championships | São Paulo, Brazil | 13th (h) | 100 m | 12.16 |
| 2007 | Pan American Junior Championships | São Paulo, Brazil | 16th (h) | 200 m | 24.84 |
| 2008 | Central American and Caribbean Championships | Cali, Colombia | – | 100 m | DQ |
| 2008 | Central American and Caribbean Championships | Cali, Colombia | 13th (h) | 200 m | 24.00 |
| 2008 | Central American and Caribbean Championships | Cali, Colombia | 5th | 4×100 m | 45.45 |
| 2008 | NACAC U23 Championships | Toluca, Mexico | 8th | 100 m | 11.75 |
| 2008 | NACAC U23 Championships | Toluca, Mexico | 3rd | 200 m | 23.50 |
| 2008 | NACAC U23 Championships | Toluca, Mexico | 3rd | 4×100 m | 46.23 |
| 2008 | Olympic Games | Beijing, China | 39th (h) | 200 m | 24.05 |
| 2010 | NACAC U23 Championships | Miramar, United States | 9th (h) | 100 m | 12.41 |
| 2010 | NACAC U23 Championships | Miramar, United States | 8th | 200 m | 25.85 (w) |
| 2010 | NACAC U23 Championships | Miramar, United States | 4th | 4×400 m | 3:42.15 |
| 2010 | Central American and Caribbean Games | Mayagüez, Puerto Rico | 4th | 4×100 m | 44.75 |
| 2011 | Central American and Caribbean Championships | Mayagüez, Puerto Rico | 11th (h) | 200 m | 23.95 |
| 2011 | Pan American Games | Guadalajara, Mexico | 5th | 100 m | 11.49 |
| 2011 | Pan American Games | Guadalajara, Mexico | 3rd | 200 m | 23.02 |
| 2012 | Central Championships | Barquisimeto, Venezuela | 4th | 100 m | 11.68 |
| 2012 | Central Championships | Barquisimeto, Venezuela | 3rd | 200 m | 23.26 |
| 2012 | Central Championships | Barquisimeto, Venezuela | 2nd | 4×100 m | 44.02 |
| 2012 | Olympic Games | London, United Kingdom | 26th (h) | 200 m | 23.20 |
| 2013 | Central American and Caribbean Championships | Morelia, Mexico | 2nd | 100 m | 11.24 |
| 2013 | Central American and Caribbean Championships | Morelia, Mexico | 3rd | 200 m | 23.15 |
| 2013 | Central American and Caribbean Championships | Morelia, Mexico | 4th | 4×100 m | 44.12 |
| 2013 | World Championships | Moscow, Russia | 21st (sf) | 100 m | 11.36 |
| 2013 | World Championships | Moscow, Russia | 14th (sf) | 200 m | 23.05 |
| 2013 | World Championships | Moscow, Russia | 14th (h) | 4×100 m | 43.28 |
| 2016 | Ibero-American Championships | Rio de Janeiro, Brazil | 11th (h) | 100 m | 11.64 |
| 2016 | Ibero-American Championships | Rio de Janeiro, Brazil | 10th (h) | 200 m | 23.84 |
| 2016 | Olympic Games | Rio de Janeiro, Brazil | 49th (h) | 200 m | 23.39 |
| 2017 | World Championships | London, United Kingdom | 40th (h) | 200 m | 23.89 |
| 2017 | Bolivarian Games | Santa Marta, Colombia | 4th | 100 m | 11.55 |
| 2017 | Bolivarian Games | Santa Marta, Colombia | 4th | 200 m | 23.67 |
| 2018 | Central American and Caribbean Games | Barranquilla, Colombia | 9th (sf) | 100 m | 11.62 |
| 2018 | Central American and Caribbean Games | Barranquilla, Colombia | – | 200 m | DQ |
| 2018 | Central American and Caribbean Games | Barranquilla, Colombia | 3rd | 4×100 m | 43.68 |
| 2019 | Pan American Games | Lima, Peru | 12th (h) | 200 m | 23.88 |

== Personal bests ==
- 100 meters – 11.24 (+0.1 m/s, Morelia 2013) NR
- 200 meters – 23.01 (+1.6 m/s, Edmonton 2013)
