= Athletics at the 2011 Pan American Games – Women's 200 metres =

Women's 200 metres at the 2011 Pan American Games
- Venue: Telmex Athletics Stadium
- Dates: October 26–27
- Competitors: 15 from 10 nations

Medalists
Gold medal	Ana Cláudia Silva	Brazil
Silver medal	Simone Facey	Jamaica
Bronze medal	Mariely Sánchez	Dominican Republic

The women's 200 metres sprint competition of the athletics events at the 2011 Pan American Games took place between the 26 and 27 of October at the Telmex Athletics Stadium. The defending Pan American Games champion is Roxana Díaz of Cuba.

== Records ==
Prior to this competition, the existing world and Pan American Games records were as follows:

World record	Florence Griffith Joyner (USA)	21.34	Seoul, South Korea	September 29, 1988
Pan American Games record	Evelyn Ashford (USA)	22.45	San Juan, Puerto Rico	July 9, 1979

== Qualification ==
Each National Olympic Committee (NOC) was able to enter up to two entrants providing they had met the minimum standard (23.78) in the qualifying period (January 1, 2010 to September 14, 2011).

== Schedule ==
Date	Time	Round
October 26, 2011	14:30	Heats
October 26, 2011	16:35	Semifinals
October 27, 2011	18:25	Final

== Results ==
All times shown are in seconds.

KEY:	q	Fastest non-qualifiers	Q	Qualified	NR	National record	PB	Personal best	SB	Seasonal best

=== Semifinals ===
The semifinals were held on October 26. The top three from each heat (Q) and next two fastest (q) qualified for the final.

Wind:
Heat 1: 0.0, Heat 2: +0.4

Rank	Heat	Name	Nationality	Time	Notes
1	1	Ana Cláudia Silva	Brazil	22.72	Q
2	1	Simone Facey	Jamaica	22.99	Q, PB
3	1	Tameka Williams	Saint Kitts and Nevis	23.25	Q, SB
4	2	Nelkis Casabona	Cuba	23.34	Q
5	2	Mariely Sánchez	Dominican Republic	23.45	Q, PB
6	2	Darlenys Obregón	Colombia	23.50	Q
7	2	Leslie Cole	United States	23.55	q
8	1	Roxana Díaz	Cuba	23.61	q, SB
9	1	Erika Chávez	Ecuador	23.67	
10	2	Anastasia Le-Roy	Jamaica	23.68	
11	2	Vanda Gomes	Brazil	23.89	
12	1	Consuella Moore	United States	24.23	
13	2	Ramona van der Vloot	Suriname	24.69	
14	1	Julia McCord	Belize	33.01	
	2	Charnelle Enriquez	Belize	DNS	

=== Final ===
The final will be held on October 27.

Wind: +0.5

Rank	Name	Nationality	Time	Notes
1st place, gold medalist(s)	Ana Cláudia Silva	Brazil	22.76	
2nd place, silver medalist(s)	Simone Facey	Jamaica	22.86	PB
3rd place, bronze medalist(s)	Mariely Sánchez	Dominican Republic	23.02	NR
4	Tameka Williams	Saint Kitts and Nevis	23.06	PB
5	Nelkis Casabona	Cuba	23.43	
6	Roxana Díaz	Cuba	23.45	SB
7	Leslie Cole	United States	23.46	
8	Darlenys Obregón	Colombia	23.64	
