= Kristi Castlin =

American track and field athlete

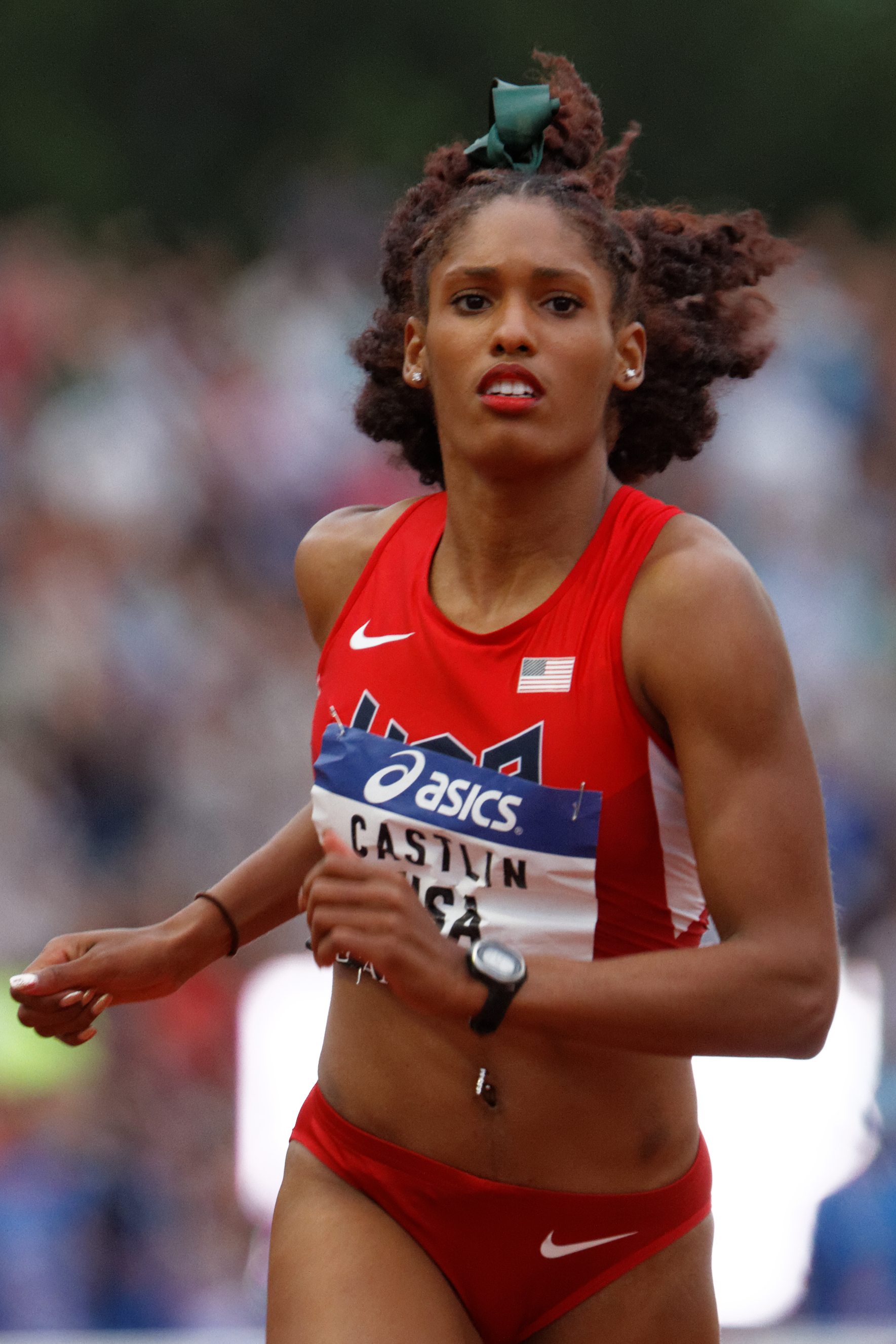
- Castlin in 2014

Personal information
- Born: July 7, 1988 (age 38) Atlanta, Georgia
- Height: 5 ft 7 in (1.70 m)
- Weight: 133 lb (60 kg)

Sport
- Club: HSInternational Sports Management
- Team: Nike
Medal record
Olympic Games
Bronze medal – third place	2016 Rio de Janeiro	100 m hurdles
NACAC Junior Championships
Silver medal – second place	2008 Toluca	100 m hurdles
Pan American Junior Championships
Gold medal – first place	2007 São Paulo	100 m hurdles

Kristi Castlin (born July 7, 1988) is an American track and field athlete who specializes in the 100 metres hurdles. She won a bronze medal at the 2016 Olympics. Her personal best for the event is 12.50 seconds, set on July 8, 2016, during the finals of the 2016 United States Olympic Trials, in which she qualified for the 2016 Summer Olympics by placing 2nd. She was the 2012 American champion in the indoor 60 metres hurdles and represented the United States at the 2012 IAAF World Indoor Championships. She shares the world record for the shuttle hurdle relay, with her time of 50.78 seconds set in 2013.

She competed collegiately for the Virginia Tech Hokies and had seven All-America finishes in the NCAA championships. These accomplishments earned her a place in the Virginia Tech sports hall of fame.

She was a gold medalist at the Pan American Junior Athletics Championships in 2007 and a silver medalist at the NACAC Under-23 Championships in Athletics in 2008.

During the 2016 Summer Olympics, Castlin wore a traditional Hindu bindi. Castlin won a bronze medal in the women's 100 metres hurdles, completing the sweep of the event along with two of her USA teammates, Brianna Rollins and Nia Ali, who won gold and silver medals respectively. It was the only sweep in the 2016 Olympic Athletics program.

== Early life ==
Castlin was born in Atlanta, Georgia, to Kimberly and Rodney Castlin. She did not take up track and field until the age of fourteen, only becoming interested when she noticed she was quicker than her classmates. While still in high school, she ran a Georgia state record time of 13.73 seconds for the 100 metres hurdles. She graduated in the top five percent of her class, and given her athletic ability, she gained a scholarship to study political science at Virginia Tech. She graduated from Virginia Tech in 2010.

== College career ==
In her first indoor season competing collegiately for the Virginia Tech Hokies, Castlin broke the school records in both the 60 metres hurdles (8.20 seconds) and 55 metres hurdles (7.61 seconds). She received All-American honors for her ninth-place finish at the 2007 NCAA Indoor Championships and was the runner-up at the Atlantic Coast Conference (ACC) indoor meet. Outdoors, she broke the American junior (under-20) record for the 100 metres hurdles, running a time of 12.91 seconds. She won the ACC Outdoor Championships title and placed ninth at the NCAA Outdoor Championships. After a win at the USA Junior Outdoor Track and Field Championships, Castlin made her international debut at the 2007 Pan American Junior Athletics Championships and came away with the gold medal and a 100 metres hurdles championship record of 13.02 seconds, beating her compatriot Queen Harrison.

Castlin continued to improve in the 2008 season. She again broke two school records in indoor hurdles and was runner-up to Tiffany Ofili at the 2008 NCAA Indoor Championships. She was also runner-up in the 60 metres hurdles at the ACC Indoor Championships. Outdoors, she won the ACC 100 metres hurdles title and ran a personal record time of 12.81 seconds for the season. With that time, she was ranked 25th in the world that year. She was a semi-finalist at the 2008 United States Olympic Trials and claimed her second international medal, a silver behind Ofili, at the 2008 NACAC Under-23 Championships in Athletics.

Her third collegiate season saw her win the ACC hurdles titles both indoors and outdoors. At the 2009 NCAA Outdoor Championships she was again runner-up in the 100 m hurdles behind Michigan Wolverines' Tiffany Ofili. Ofili was also victorious at the NCAA Indoor Championships, with Castlin taking third place on that occasion. In her final year in 2010 she was runner-up at the NCAA Indoor Championships behind Queen Harrison, She was knocked out of the top three at the NCAA Outdoor competition – her last NCAA event – and took fourth place behind Aleesha Barber.

Castlin closed her career with the Hokies having won four ACC titles, broken the conference record for the 100 m hurdles and taken eight All-American honors from NCAA competition.

== Professional career ==
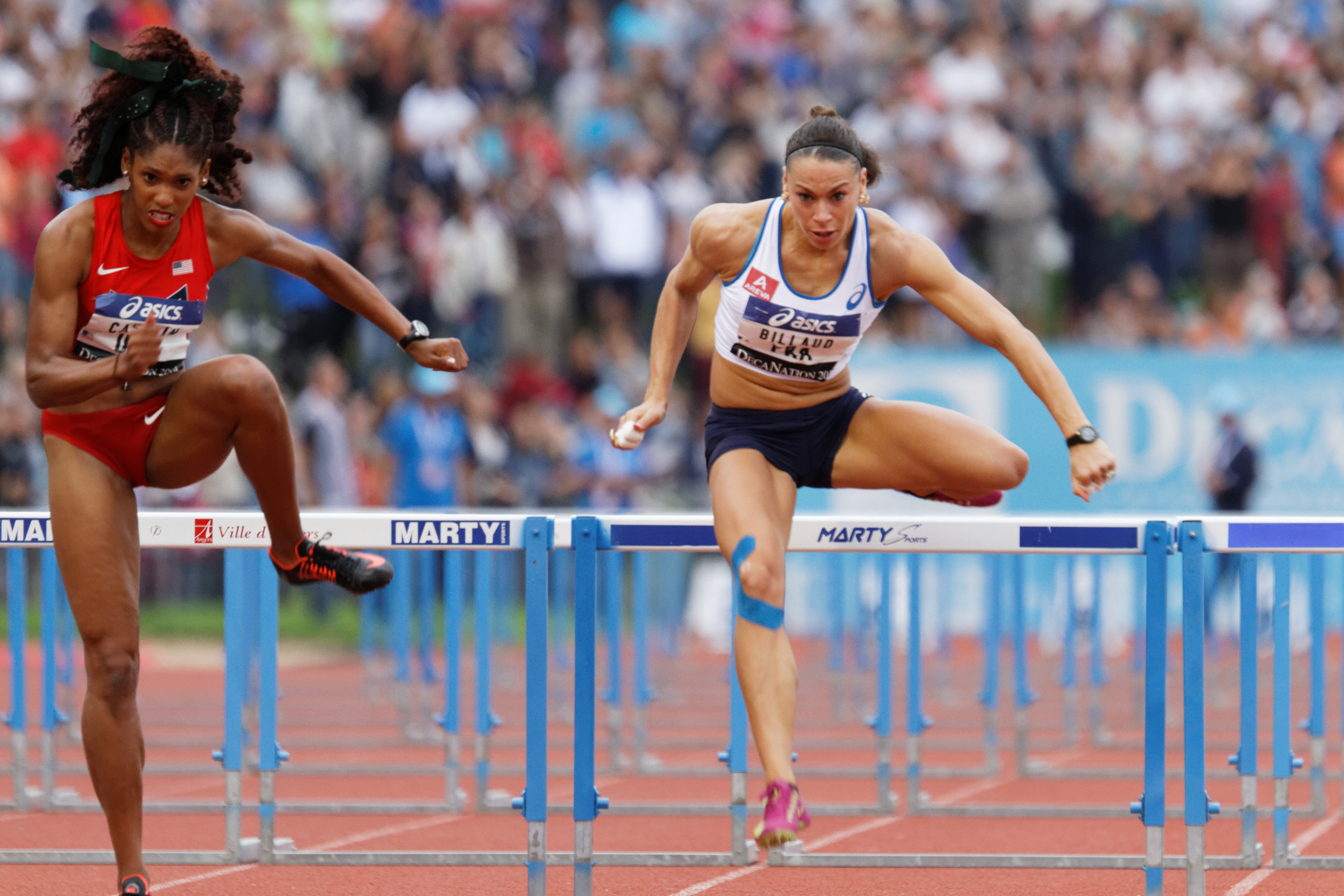
Castlin (left) racing against Cindy Billaud at the DecaNation meet in 2014

Castlin turned professional after leaving Virginia Tech, gaining an Adidas sponsorship, and set a season's best of 12.83 seconds at the 2011 USA Outdoor Track and Field Championships. However, she false started in the semi-finals and was disqualified. She secured her first national title at the 2012 USA Indoor Track and Field Championships, setting a personal record of 7.84 seconds in the process. The time ultimately ranked as the second fastest in the world that year for the 60 m hurdles. This gained her selection for the 2012 IAAF World Indoor Championships – her first senior appearance. In spite of her entering the competition as one of the favourites, she failed to finish her heat as she mistook the sound of the starter's pistol for a recall (due to the echo in the hall) and stopped running before the first hurdle.

At the 2012 United States Olympic Trials she reached the semi-finals, but her time of 12.93 seconds was not enough to progress. She performed well, however, on the 2012 IAAF Diamond League circuit that year. She greatly improved her personal record to 12.56 seconds as runner-up at the Bislett Games in Oslo – a time which ranked her sixth in the world for 2012. Her other major placings included fourth at both the Meeting Areva in Paris and the London Grand Prix.

Castlin tried to defend her national title at the 2013 USA Indoor Track and Field Championships, but was beaten into second place by Nia Ali. At the 2013 USA Outdoor Track and Field Championships she had her best national placing yet, taking sixth in a time of 12.61 seconds (her fastest that year). She ranked tenth globally for the season. Her 2013 was highlighted by a world record in the infrequently contested shuttle hurdle relay – at the Florida Relays a team of Ali, Castlin, Yvette Lewis and Queen Harrison completed the 4×100 m relay event in a new best time of 50.78 seconds.

She ranked in the top three at the 2014 USA Indoor Track and Field Championships, doing so at the national event for the third year running. She was selected at the USA Track & Field athlete of the week at the end of April 2014 as a result of her breaking Brianna Rollins' streak of 35 races without defeat; Castlin's run of 12.571 seconds edged Rollins by five thousandths of a second and broke the Drake Relays meet record. This proved to be her fastest of the season and enough to place her seventh in the annual global rankings. She defeated both Rollins (the world champion) and Sally Pearson (the Olympic champion) at the Spitzen Leichtathletik Luzern in July. She ended the year with a win in the non-Diamond League 100 m hurdles at the Memorial Van Damme meet in Brussels.

During the 2016 United States Olympic Trials for track and field, Castlin placed second in the 100 m hurdles with a time of 12.50 seconds, behind Brianna Rollins and ahead of Nia Ali, and qualified to represent the United States at the 2016 Summer Olympics in Brazil.

She earned a bronze medal at the Rio Olympics in the 100 m hurdles, with a time of 12.61 seconds, outleaning Cindy Ofili at the finish. Castlin finished behind American teammates Brianna Rollins, who earned the gold medal with a time of 12.48 seconds, and Nia Ali, who earned the silver medal with a time of 12.59 seconds. It was the first time in Olympic history that American women had swept the medals in any event, and made the United States the first country to win gold, silver, and bronze in the women's 100 m hurdles in one Olympics. HSInternational Sports Management announced its signing of Kristi "Hollywood" Castlin, the Rio Olympic Bronze Medalist at 100 m Hurdles.

== Personal bests ==
Outdoor

- 100-meter hurdles – 12.50 (2016)

Indoor

- 50-meter hurdles – 6.81 (2012)
- 55-meter hurdles – 7.37 (2012)
- 60-meter hurdles – 7.84 (2012)
- 200-meter dash – 24.61 (2008)

== National titles ==
- USA Indoor Track and Field Championships
  - 60-meter hurdles: 2012

== International competitions ==
Year	Competition	Venue	Position	Event	Notes
2007	Pan American Junior Championships	São Paulo, Brazil	1st	100 m hurdles	13.02 CR
2008	NACAC U23 Championships	Toluca, Mexico	2nd	100 m hurdles	13.21
2012	World Indoor Championships	Istanbul, Turkey	— (h)	60 m hurdles	DNF
2016	Olympic Games	Rio de Janeiro, Brazil	3rd	100 m hurdles	12.61
2017	DécaNation	Angers, France	1st	100 m hurdles	12.95
