= José Carlos Herrera =

Mexican sprinter (born 1986)

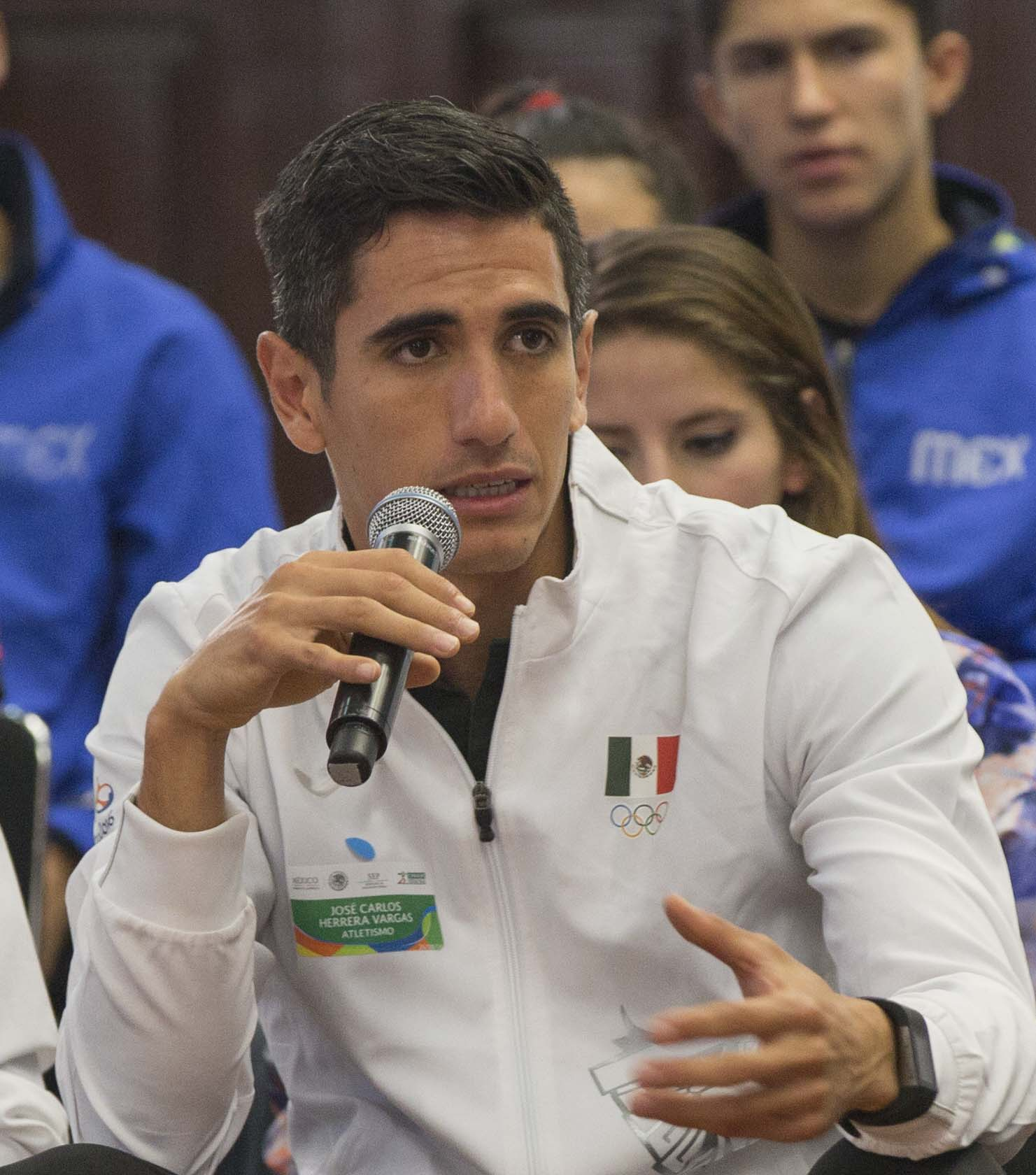
- Herrera in 2016

Personal information
- Full name: José Carlos Herrera Vargas
- Nationality: (Mexico) Mexican
- Born: February 5, 1986 (age 40) Monterrey, Nuevo León, Mexico
- Height: 1.87 m (6 ft 2 in)
- Weight: 77 kg (170 lb)

Sport
- Sport: Running
- Event: Sprints
- Updated on 10 December 2014

José Carlos Herrera Vargas (born February 5, 1986) is a Mexican sprinter. At the 2012 Summer Olympics, he competed in the Men's 200 metres.

== Personal bests ==
=== Outdoor ===
- 100 m: 10.21 s A (wind: +0.8 m/s) – Xalapa, Mexico, 29 August 2014
- 200 m: 20.29 s – Rio de Janeiro, Brazil, 17 August 2016
- 400 m: 46.18 s – {Monterrey, Mexico, 12 March 2010
- 800 m: 1:54.30 min – Monterrey, Mexico, 14 March 2008

== International competitions ==
Year	Competition	Venue	Position	Event	Notes
Representing Mexico
2008	NACAC U-23 Championships	Toluca, Mexico	14th (h)	200m	21.84 (wind: -1.4 m/s) A
2008	NACAC U-23 Championships	Toluca, Mexico	6th	4 × 100 m relay	40.94 A
2009	Central American and Caribbean Championships	Havana, Cuba	24th (h)	200m	22.16 (wind: -0.5 m/s)
2009	Central American and Caribbean Championships	Havana, Cuba	18th (h)	400m	48.25
2010	Ibero-American Championships	San Fernando, Spain	8th	400m	47.16
2010	Central American and Caribbean Games	Mayagüez, Puerto Rico	10th (h)	200m	21.00 (wind: -1.0 m/s)
2010	Central American and Caribbean Games	Mayagüez, Puerto Rico	13th (h)	400m	47.59
2012	Ibero-American Championships	Barquisimeto, Venezuela	7th	200m	21.09 (wind: -0.9 m/s)
2012	Olympic Games	London, United Kingdom	7th (h)	200m	21.17 (wind: +1.1 m/s)
2013	Central American and Caribbean Championships	Morelia, Mexico	13th (h)	200m	21.20 A (wind: -1.2 m/s)
2014	Pan American Sports Festival	Mexico City, Mexico	4th	200m	20.36 A (wind: +0.6 m/s)
2014	Central American and Caribbean Games	Xalapa, Mexico	5th (h)	100m	10.58 A (wind: -1.0 m/s)
2014	Central American and Caribbean Games	Xalapa, Mexico	3rd	200m	20.63 A (wind: -1.8 m/s)
2014	Central American and Caribbean Games	Xalapa, Mexico	6th	4 × 100 m relay	40.21 A
2016	Olympic Games	Rio de Janeiro, Brazil	20th (sf)	200 m	20.48
