= Jeff Porter =

American track and field athlete

Jeff Porter OLY
Personal information
- National team: United States
- Born: November 27, 1985 (age 40) Summit, New Jersey, U.S.
- Spouse: Tiffany Porter

Sport
- Sport: Athletics (track and field)
- Event: 110-meter hurdles

Jeffrey Issack Porter (born November 27, 1985) is an American track and field athlete who competes in the 110-meter hurdles. He has a personal best of 13.08 seconds for the event. He gained a spot on the American Olympic team by coming third at the 2012 United States Olympic Trials. He repeated his third place at the 2016 United States Olympic Trials to make his second Olympic team. On June 25, 2017, he announced his retirement from track and field.

He competed for the University of Michigan collegiately and was the 2007 NCAA indoor champion in the 60-meter hurdles. He represented his country at the 2011 Pan American Games, coming fourth in the hurdles, and the 2012 Summer Olympics, reaching the semi-finals.

== Early life and college ==
Born in Summit, New Jersey, Porter grew up in the Somerset section of Franklin Township, New Jersey and attended Franklin High School as part of the class of 2003, where he was the top American junior hurdler in 2002. He won the 110 m hurdles at the 2001 AAU Junior Olympics. He gained an athletic scholarship to study kinesiology at the University of Michigan. In his freshman indoor season in 2004 he won the Big Ten Conference title in the 60-meter hurdles and he was runner-up at that season's Big Ten Outdoor meet. He was less successful in his second season at Michigan, taking third at the Big Ten Indoor Championship and eighth outdoors.

Porter came second at the 2006 Big Ten Indoor meet then placed fourth in the NCAA Indoor Championship with a personal record run of 7.77 seconds. He opened his outdoor season by improving his 110 m hurdles best to 13.93 seconds and he went on to win his first Big Ten Outdoor title. He continued to improve in his final year for the Ron Warhurst-coached Michigan Wolverines: he was runner-up in the 60 m hurdles at the Big Ten Indoors, but won his first NCAA title two weeks later with a personal record run of 7.64 seconds. He made large improvements outdoors, winning the Big Ten title in a best of 13.70 seconds. He ran a 110 m hurdles lifetime best of 13.57 seconds in the semi-finals of the NCAA Outdoors, but was a little slower in the final, finishing fourth. He made his debut at the USA Outdoor Track and Field Championships that year and reached the semi-finals.

== Professional career ==
Porter competed on the European track and field circuit for the first time in 2008 and at the Golden Spike Ostrava meet he ran a personal best of 13.47 seconds, but he did not carry this form to the United States Olympic Trials, where he was eliminated in the early stages. He ran 13.58 seconds in Ostrava the year after, but again failed at national level at the 2009 USA Outdoor Track and Field Championships. After competing a smaller European meeting he ended the season with a best of 13.37 seconds. He received his first national level honours at the USA Indoor Track and Field Championships in 2010 by taking the bronze medal in the 60 m hurdles with a personal record of 7.62 seconds. In spite of a quick start to the outdoor season – 13.45 seconds at the Osaka Grand Prix in May – he did not reach faster times in the rest of the year and was again eliminated in the rounds of the national championships.

He had a strong indoor season in Europe in 2011: he won the Guglindoor and Meeting Pas de Calais (setting a best of 7.57 at the latter), then placed top three at the Aviva Indoor Grand Prix and XL Galan. He also bettered his outdoor performances, running 13.34 in Montreuil and placing fifth in the final at the 2011 USA Championships with a best of 13.26 seconds. He won the Palio Citta della Quercia meet in September and a month later he represented his country for the first time at the 2011 Pan American Games, where he took fourth place. In light of his achievements, he received an elite athlete development grant from the USATF Foundation in February 2012.

The 2012 season began with another good indoor season for Porter, highlighted by a record run of 7.54 seconds to win at the BW-Bank Meeting in Karlsruhe. He dipped under 13.3 seconds for the 110 m hurdles at the Golden Spike Ostrava meet, finishing behind Dexter Faulk with a run of 13.29, and his wife Tiffany Porter won the women's hurdles race. He ran 13.26 in June to reach his first Diamond League podium at the New York's adidas Grand Prix, being beaten only by world champion Jason Richardson. His upward trend continued at the 2012 United States Olympic Trials, where he ran 13.19 in the semi-finals, then got the third Olympic spot in the final in a personal record time of 13.08 seconds. He was a surprise addition to the American Olympic squad, beating highly ranked hurdlers including David Oliver.

At the 2016 United States Olympic Trials, Porter ran 13.21 for a qualifying third place, the same time as second place Ronnie Ash, the placing separated by one thousandth of a second.

== Personal life ==
He is married to another hurdler, Tiffany Porter, who competes internationally for Great Britain. Their family is Catholic.
