= Bobby-Gaye Wilkins =

Jamaican athlete (born 1988)

Personal information
- Full name: Bobby-Gaye Wilkins-Gooden
- Born: 10 September 1988 (age 37) Manchester Parish, Jamaica

Sport
- Country: Jamaica
- Sport: Athletics
- Event: Running
Medal record
Women's athletics
Representing Jamaica
Olympic Games
Bronze medal – third place	2008 Beijing	4x400 m relay
CAC Junior Championships (U20)
Gold medal – first place	2006 Port of Spain	4x400 m relay
Silver medal – second place	2006 Port of Spain	400 m
CARIFTA Games Junior (U20)
Gold medal – first place	2006 Les Abymes	800 m
Gold medal – first place	2006 Les Abymes	4x400 m relay
Gold medal – first place	2007 Providenciales	400 m
Gold medal – first place	2007 Providenciales	4x400 m relay
Silver medal – second place	2005 Bacolet	800 m
CARIFTA Games Youth (U17)
Gold medal – first place	2004 Hamilton	4x400 m relay
- Updated on 26 January 2015

Bobby-Gaye Wilkins (born 10 September 1988) is a Jamaican athlete. She represented her country at the 2008 Olympic Games in Beijing, China, winning a bronze medal in the 4×400 metres relay.

Her first major international appearance came at the 2005 World Youth Championships in Athletics, where she reached the final of the 400 metres.

She was selected as a reserve for the relay at the 2009 World Championships in Athletics, but she did not compete. She reached the semi-finals of the 400 m at the 2010 IAAF World Indoor Championships, but enjoyed greater success in the women's relay: along with Clora Williams, Davita Prendergast and Novlene Williams-Mills, she won the bronze medal in a Jamaican indoor record of 3:28.49 (also a Central American and Caribbean record).

However, she failed her drug test at the competition, and the Jamaican team was disqualified. Her sample contained andarine (a selective androgen receptor modulator), making her the second international runner to test positive for the class of anabolic drugs, after Thomas Goller. She received a two-year ban from competitive athletics for the infraction.

== Personal bests ==
Event	Result	Venue	Date
400 m	50.87 s	Kingston, Jamaica	28 Jun 2008
800 m	2:04.87 min	Kingston, Jamaica	22 Mar 2008

== Achievements ==
Year	Competition	Venue	Position	Event	Notes
Representing Jamaica
2004	CARIFTA Games (U-17)	Hamilton, Bermuda	4th	400 m	56.96
2004	CARIFTA Games (U-17)	Hamilton, Bermuda	1st	4 × 400 m relay	3:48.32
2005	CARIFTA Games (U-20)	Bacolet, Trinidad and Tobago	2nd	800 m	2:12.98
2005	CARIFTA Games (U-20)	Bacolet, Trinidad and Tobago	1st	4 × 400 m relay	3:36.91
2005	World Youth Championships	Marrakesh, Morocco	7th	400 m	54.72
2005	Pan American Junior Championships	Windsor, Canada	2nd	4 × 400 m relay	3:36.99
2006	CARIFTA Games (U-20)	Les Abymes, Guadeloupe	1st	800 m	2:09.36
2006	CARIFTA Games (U-20)	Les Abymes, Guadeloupe	1st	4 × 400 m relay	3:31.90 CR
2006	Central American and Caribbean Junior Championships (U-20)	Port of Spain, Trinidad and Tobago	2nd	400 m	53.19
2006	Central American and Caribbean Junior Championships (U-20)	Port of Spain, Trinidad and Tobago	1st	4 × 400 m relay	3:36.02
2007	CARIFTA Games (U-20)	Providenciales, Turks and Caicos Islands	1st	400 m	53.01
2007	CARIFTA Games (U-20)	Providenciales, Turks and Caicos Islands	1st	4 × 400 m relay	3:36.26
2007	Pan American Junior Championships	São Paulo, Brazil	1st	400m	51.72
2008	NACAC U-23 Championships	Toluca, Mexico	1st	400m	51.34 A
2008	NACAC U-23 Championships	Toluca, Mexico	1st	4 × 400 m relay	3:27.46 A
2008	Olympic Games	Beijing, China	3rd^{1}	4 × 400 m relay	3:22.60^{1}
2010	World Indoor Championships	Doha, Qatar	DSQ	400m	DSQ (52.59) (Doping)
2010	World Indoor Championships	Doha, Qatar	DSQ (3rd)	4 × 400 m relay	DSQ (3:28.49) (Doping)
2013	Central American and Caribbean Championships	Morelia, Mexico	5th	400m	53.01 A
2013	Central American and Caribbean Championships	Morelia, Mexico	—	4 × 400 m relay	DQ
2014	Pan American Sports Festival	Mexico City, Mexico	3rd	400m	51.84 A
2015	NACAC Championships	San José, Costa Rica	3rd	400m	52.45
2015	NACAC Championships	San José, Costa Rica	2nd	4 × 400 m relay	3:28.65

^{1}: Competed only in the heat.

== See also ==
- List of doping cases in athletics
