= Jenna Martin =

Canadian track and field athlete

Personal information
- Born: March 31, 1988 (age 38) Liverpool, Nova Scotia, Canada
- Height: 1.73 m (5 ft 8 in)
- Weight: 65 kg (143 lb)

Sport
- Country: Canada
- Sport: Athletics
- Event: 400 m

Jenna Martin (born March 31, 1988) is a Canadian track and field athlete who specialises in the 400 metres. She competed in the 400 metres event at the 2012 Summer Olympics, reaching the semifinals.

Martin was born in Liverpool, Nova Scotia. She competed for the Kentucky Wildcats track and field team in the NCAA.

She was the Canadian national champion in the 400 m in 2012 and set a personal best of 51.53 seconds that year in Calgary.

== International competitions ==
Year	Competition	Venue	Position	Event	Notes
Representing Canada
2003	World Youth Championships	Sherbrooke, Canada	10th (h)	400 m	55.85
2003	World Youth Championships	Sherbrooke, Canada	4th	Medley relay	2:09.03
2007	Pan American Junior Championships	São Paulo, Brazil	2nd	400 m	51.91
2007	Pan American Junior Championships	São Paulo, Brazil	4th	4 × 400 m relay	3:38.85
2008	NACAC U-23 Championships	Toluca, Mexico	3rd	400m	52.45 A
2008	NACAC U-23 Championships	Toluca, Mexico	3rd	4 × 400 m relay	3:35.26 A
2009	World Championships	Berlin, Germany	6th (h)	4 × 400 m relay	3:29.17
2011	Universiade	Shenzhen, China	5th	400 m	53.11
2011	World Championships	Daegu, South Korea	13th (h)	4 × 400 m relay	3:27.92
2012	Olympic Games	London, United Kingdom	23rd (sf)	400 m	52.83
2013	World Championships	Moscow, Russia	12th (h)	4 × 400 m relay	3:31.09
2014	IAAF World Relays	Nassau, Bahamas	11th	4 × 400 m relay	3:32.58
