= Yolanda Osana =

Dominican Republic hurdler

Personal information
- Born: 11 August 1987 (age 38)

Sport
- Sport: Track and field
Medal record
Track and field
Representing Dominican Republic
Pan American Games
Bronze medal – third place	2011 Guadalajara	400m hurdles
Central American and Caribbean Games
Bronze medal – third place	2010 Mayagüez	400m hurdles

Yolanda Osana Valerio (born 11 August 1987) is a Dominican athlete specializing in the 400 meters hurdles. Her personal best in the event is 57.08 achieved in Guadalajara in 2011. She also played football for the Dominican Republic youth and senior national teams.

== Competition record ==
Year	Competition	Venue	Position	Event	Notes
Representing Dominican Republic
2006	Central American and Caribbean Games	Cartagena, Colombia	6th	400 m hurdles	62.34
2007	NACAC Championships	San Salvador, El Salvador	4th	400 m hurdles	59.21
2008	Central American and Caribbean Championships	Cali, Colombia	3rd	400 m hurdles	58.91
2008	Central American and Caribbean Championships	Cali, Colombia	5th	4 × 100 m relay	45.45
2008	Central American and Caribbean Championships	Cali, Colombia	5th	4 × 400 m relay	3:42.58
2008	NACAC U-23 Championships	Toluca, Mexico	3rd	400m hurdles	58.74 A
2008	NACAC U-23 Championships	Toluca, Mexico	3rd	4 × 100 m relay	46.23 A
2008	NACAC U-23 Championships	Toluca, Mexico	5th	4 × 400 m relay	3:50.97 A
2009	Central American and Caribbean Championships	Havana, Cuba	4th	400 m hurdles	58.35
2009	Central American and Caribbean Championships	Havana, Cuba	6th	4 × 400 m relay	3:40.40
2009	World Championships	Berlin, Germany	33rd (h)	400 m hurdles	59.18
2010	Central American and Caribbean Games	Mayagüez, Puerto Rico	3rd	400 m hurdles	57.73
2010	Central American and Caribbean Games	Mayagüez, Puerto Rico	4th	4 × 400 m relay	3:36.40 (NR)
2011	Central American and Caribbean Championships	Mayagüez, Puerto Rico	2nd	400 m hurdles	57.23
2011	Central American and Caribbean Championships	Mayagüez, Puerto Rico	2nd	4 × 400 m relay	3:34.73
2011	Pan American Games	Guadalajara, Mexico	3rd	400 m hurdles	57.08 (NR)
2012	Ibero-American Championships	Barquisimeto, Venezuela	3rd	400 m hurdles	57.14
2012	Ibero-American Championships	Barquisimeto, Venezuela	3rd	4 × 400 m relay	3:38.48
