= Antillio Bastian =

Bahamian Triple jumper long jumper and sprinter

Personal information
- Born: May 20, 1988 (age 37) Nassau, Bahamas

Sport
- Country: Bahamas
- Sport: Track and field
- Event(s): Sprint, triple jump, long jump

Antillio Bastian (born 20 May 1988) is a Bahamian sprinter triple jumper and long jumper from Nassau, Bahamas. He attended St Johns College in Nassau, before going on to compete for Dickinson State University and University of South Florida.

Bastian competed at the 2008 NACAC Under-23 Championships in Athletics and the 2010 NACAC Under-23 Championships in Athletics.

Bastian was also a part of the Bahamas 4 × 100 m relay team at the 2013 Penn Relays. The team was trying to qualify for the 2013 World Athletics Championships in Moscow, Russia.

Bastian would also go on to win the 200m at the 2011 Big East Outdoor Track and Field Championships.

== Personal bests ==
Event	Time	Venue	Date
100 m	10.48 (+0.5)	Nassau, Bahamas	13 APR 2013
200 m	20.94 (+0.9)	Nassau, Bahamas	22 JUN 2013
Triple jump	15.38 m (0.0)	Toluca, Mexico	18 JUL 2008
Long jump	7.23 m (+1.3)	Tampa, Florida	01 APR 2011
