= Johnny Dutch =

American hurdler

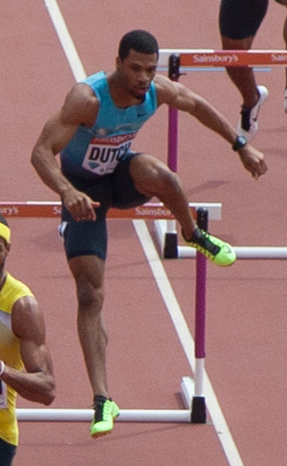
- Dutch in 2013

Personal information
- Nationality: American
- Born: January 20, 1989 (age 37)
- Education: University of South Carolina
- Height: 5 ft 11 in (1.80 m)

Sport
- Sport: USA Track and Field
- Event: 400 hurdles

Achievements and titles
- Personal bests: 110m hurdles: 13.46 (1.9 m/s); 400m hurdles: 47.63
Medal record
Men's athletics
Representing the United States
IAAF World Junior Championships in Athletics
Silver medal – second place	2008 Bydgoszcz	400 m hurdles
Pan American Junior Championships
Gold medal – first place	2007 São Paulo	110 m hurdles
Gold medal – first place	2007 São Paulo	400 m hurdles
Silver medal – second place	2007 São Paulo	4x400 m relay

Johnny Dutch (born January 20 1989) is an American athlete, specialising in the 400m hurdles.

== Athletic career ==
While attending Clayton High School in Clayton, North Carolina, Dutch was a nine-time state champion in both hurdle events. At the 2007 Pan American Junior Athletics Championships, Dutch won gold in the 110 m hurdles (99.0 cm) and 400 m hurdles. He also won a silver medal in the 4x400 m relay.

Competing for the South Carolina Gamecocks track and field team, Dutch won the 2010 NCAA Division I Outdoor Track and Field Championships in the 400 m hurdles.

At the 2008 Olympic Trials, Dutch finished 5th in the 400 m hurdles with a time of 48.52. At the 2008 World Junior Championships in Athletics, he won a silver medal in the 400 m hurdles behind fellow American Jeshua Anderson.

At the 2009 USA Outdoor Track & Field Championships, Dutch finished second to Bershawn Jackson to earn a bid at the 2009 World Championships in Athletics. At the 2009 World Championships, Dutch did not make it past the semifinals and finished 16th overall.

At the 2014 USA Outdoor Track and Field Championships in Sacramento, California, Dutch won his first American title in the 400 m hurdles with a time of 48.93.

== Personal bests ==
Event	Time	Venue	Date
110 m hurdles	13.50 (1.6 m/s)	Des Moines, Iowa	May 8, 2010
400 m hurdles	47.63	Chapel Hill, North Carolina	June 26, 2010
