= Justin Gaymon =

American hurdler (born 1986)

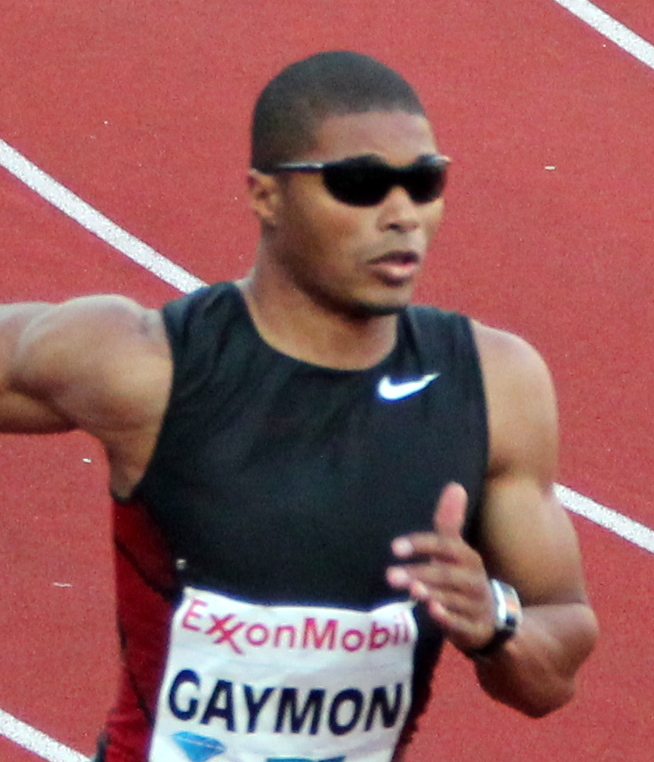
- Gaymon at the 2012 Oslo Diamond League

Personal information
- Nationality: American
- Born: December 13, 1986 (age 39)
- Home town: Stewartsville, New Jersey
- Height: 175 cm (5 ft 9 in)
- Weight: 70 kg (150 lb)

Sport
- Sport: Athletics
- Event(s): 400 metres hurdles, 400 metres
- College team: Georgia Bulldogs

Achievements and titles
- Personal best: 400mH: 48.46 (2008)
Medal record
Men's athletics
Representing United States
NACAC U23 Championships
Gold medal – first place	2008 Toluca	400 m hurdles
European Champion Clubs Cup
Gold medal – first place	2015 Mersin	400 m hurdles

Justin Gaymon (born December 13, 1986) is an American former 400 metre hurdler. He was the 2008 NACAC U23 champion, and in 2008 he was just 0.04 seconds away from making the U.S. Olympic team.

== Biography ==
Raised in the Stewartsville section of Greenwich Township, Warren County, New Jersey, Gaymon attended Phillipsburg High School. He competed in both track and gridiron football, winning five state titles in the short and long hurdles and was ranked #1 all-time in the region as a prep.

As a member of the Georgia Bulldogs track and field team, Gaymon placed third individually twice at the NCAA Men's Division I Outdoor Track and Field Championships and won the 2008 NACAC U23 Championships in Athletics in the 400m hurdles.

Gaymon competed in both the 2008 United States Olympic Trials and the 2012 trials in the 400 metres hurdles. In the 2008 trials, he finished in fourth place, setting a personal best of 48.46 seconds, just 0.04 seconds away from qualifying for the Olympic team.

== Statistics ==
=== Personal bests ===
Event	Mark	Competition	Venue	Date
400 metres hurdles	48.46	2008 United States Olympic Trials	Eugene, Oregon	29 June 2008
