= Anastasia Le-Roy =

Jamaican sprinter (born 1987)

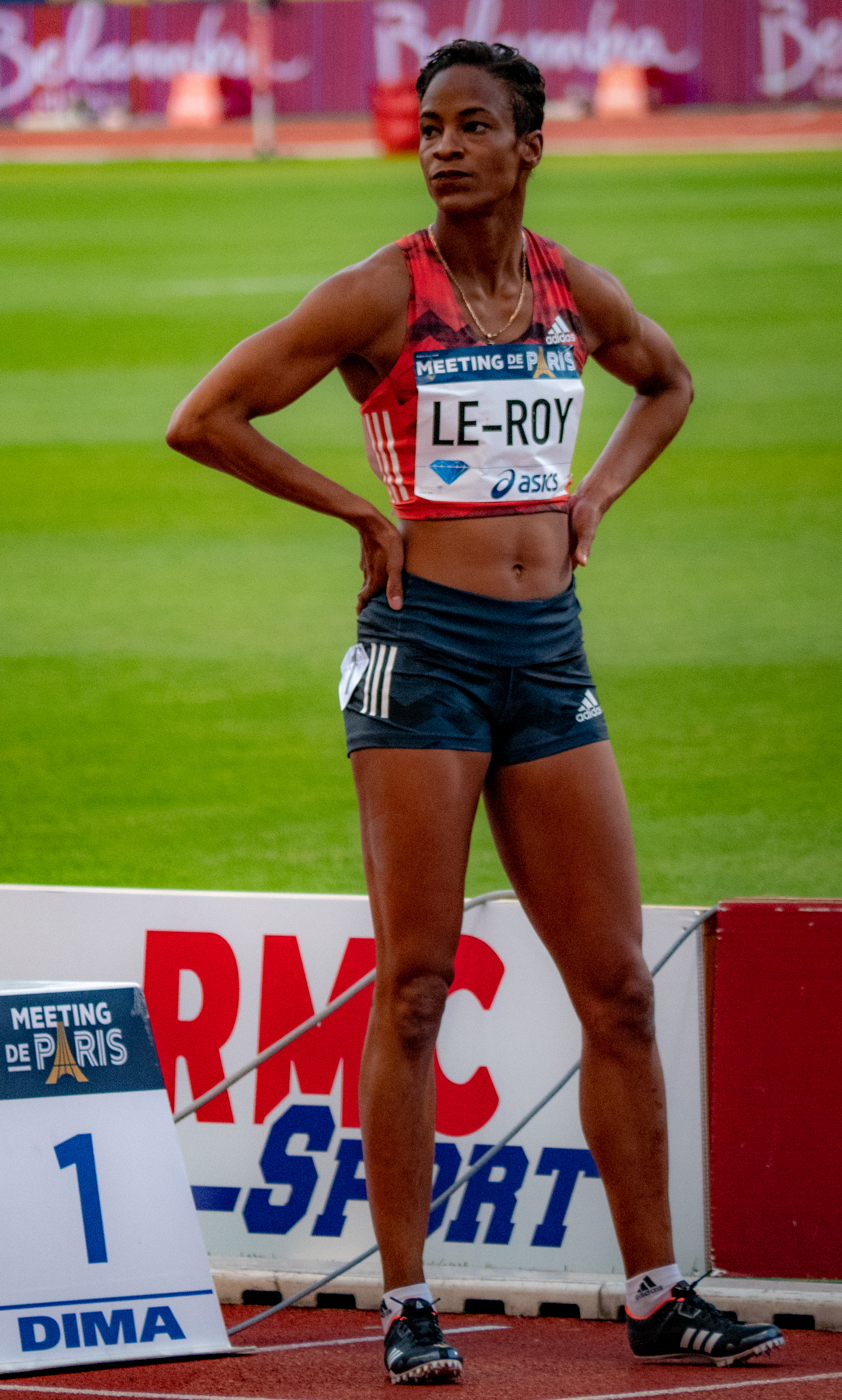
- Anastasia Le-Roy in 2018

Personal information
- Full name: Anastasia Natalie le-Roy
- Born: 11 September 1987 (age 38) Manchester Parish, Jamaica
- Height: 1.68 m (5 ft 6 in)
- Weight: 57 kg (126 lb)

Sport
- Country: Jamaica
- Sport: Track and field
- Event: Sprinting
- Club: Sprintec Track & Field Club
Medal record
World Championships
| Gold medal – first place | 2015 Beijing | 4 × 400 m relay |
| Silver medal – second place | 2007 Osaka | 4 × 400 m relay |
| Bronze medal – third place | 2019 Doha | 4 × 400 m relay |
Commonwealth Games
| Gold medal – first place | 2014 Glasgow | 4 × 400 m relay |
| Gold medal – first place | 2018 Gold Coast | 4 × 400 m relay |
| Silver medal – second place | 2018 Gold Coast | 400 m |

Anastasia Le-Roy (born 11 September 1987) is a Jamaican track and field athlete, who specializes in the 400 metres. Le-Roy, in recent times has positioned herself as a key member of Jamaica's 4 × 400 metres women team and helped them in setting a games' record of 3 minutes 23.82 seconds (3:23.82) at the 2014 Commonwealth Games.

== Personal bests ==
| Event | Time (sec) | Venue | Date |
|---|---|---|---|
| 100 metres | 11.41 | Kingston, Jamaica | 30 March 2007 |
| 200 metres | 22.85 | Kingston, Jamaica | 16 April 2016 |
| 400 metres | 50.57 | Gold Coast, Australia | 11 April 2018 |

- All information taken from IAAF profile.

== Competition record ==
| Year | Competition | Venue | Position | Event | Notes |
Representing Jamaica
| 2004 | Central American and Caribbean; Junior Championships (U20) | Coatzacoalcos, Mexico | 3rd | 200 m | 23.71 w (+2.7 m/s) |
| 2004 | Central American and Caribbean; Junior Championships (U20) | Coatzacoalcos, Mexico | 1st | 4 × 100 m relay | 44.85 |
| 2005 | CARIFTA Games (U20) | Bacolet, Trinidad and Tobago | 2nd | 400 m | 55.19 |
| 2005 | CARIFTA Games (U20) | Bacolet, Trinidad and Tobago | 1st | 4 × 400 m relay | 3:36.91 |
| 2005 | Pan American Junior Championships | Windsor, Canada | 6th (h) | 400 m | 56.66 |
| 2005 | Pan American Junior Championships | Windsor, Canada | 2nd | 4 × 400 m relay | 3:36.99 |
| 2006 | CARIFTA Games (U20) | Les Abymes, Guadeloupe | 2nd | 200 m | 23.54 (−0.8 m/s) |
| 2006 | CARIFTA Games (U20) | Les Abymes, Guadeloupe | 1st | 4 × 100 m relay | 44.91 |
| 2006 | Central American and Caribbean; Junior Championships (U20) | Port of Spain, Trinidad and Tobago | 2nd | 200 m | 23.25 (+2.0 m/s) |
| 2006 | Central American and Caribbean; Junior Championships (U20) | Port of Spain, Trinidad and Tobago | 1st | 4 × 100 m relay | 44.74 |
| 2006 | World Junior Championships | Beijing, China | 6th | 200 m | 23.88 (−0.9 m/s) |
| 2006 | World Junior Championships | Beijing, China | 3rd | 4 × 100 m relay | 44.22 |
| 2007 | Pan American Games | Rio de Janeiro, Brazil | 4th | 4 × 400 m relay | 3:28.74 |
| 2007 | World Championships | Osaka, Japan | 2nd^{1} | 4 × 400 m relay | 3:26.14^{1} |
| 2008 | NACAC U-23 Championships | Toluca, Mexico | 2nd | 400 m | 52.21 A |
| 2008 | NACAC U-23 Championships | Toluca, Mexico | 2nd | 4 × 100 m relay | 43.73 A |
| 2008 | NACAC U-23 Championships | Toluca, Mexico | 1st | 4 × 400 m relay | 3:27.46 A |
| 2009 | Central American and Caribbean Championships | Havana, Cuba | 15th (h) | 400 m | 55.85 |
| 2009 | Central American and Caribbean Championships | Havana, Cuba | 4th | 4 × 100 m relay | 43.98 |
| 2009 | Central American and Caribbean Championships | Havana, Cuba | 2nd | 4 × 400 m relay | 3:34.02 |
| 2010 | Central American and Caribbean Games | Mayagüez, Puerto Rico | — | 400 m | DNF |
| 2010 | Central American and Caribbean Games | Mayagüez, Puerto Rico | 2nd | 4 × 100 m relay | 44.27 |
| 2011 | Central American and Caribbean Championships | Mayagüez, Puerto Rico | 3rd | 200 m | 23.13 (+1.4 m/s) |
| 2011 | Central American and Caribbean Championships | Mayagüez, Puerto Rico | 2nd | 4 × 100 m relay | 43.63 |
| 2011 | Universiade | Shenzhen, China | 5th | 200 m | 23.32 (+0.7 m/s) |
| 2011 | Universiade | Shenzhen, China | 3rd | 4 × 100 m relay | 43.57 |
| 2011 | Pan American Games | Guadalajara, Mexico | 10th (sf) | 200 m | 23.68 (+0.4 m/s) A |
| 2011 | Pan American Games | Guadalajara, Mexico | — | 4 × 100 m relay | DNF |
| 2013 | BVI Twilight Invitational | Road Town, British Virgin Islands | 2nd place, silver medalist(s) | 400 m | 51.65 |
| 2013 | Universiade | Kazan, Russia | 3rd | 400 m | 51.72 |
| 2013 | World Championships | Moscow, Russia | — | 4 × 400 m relay | DQ |
| 2014 | World Relays | Nassau, Bahamas | 2nd | 4 × 400 m relay | 3:23.26 |
| 2014 | Commonwealth Games | Glasgow, United Kingdom | 1st | 4 × 400 m relay | 3:23.82 |
| 2014 | Pan American Sports Festival | Mexico City, Mexico | 1st | 400 m | 51.28 A |
| 2015 | World Championships | Beijing, China | 1st^{1} | 4 × 400 m relay | 3:23.62^{1} |
| 2017 | World Relays | Nassau, Bahamas | 3rd (h) | 4 × 200 m relay | 1:31.29 |
| 2017 | World Championships | London, United Kingdom | 2nd (h) | 4 × 400 m relay | 3:23.64 |
| 2018 | World Indoor Championships | Birmingham, United Kingdom | 2nd (h) | 4 × 400 m relay | 3:32.01^{2} |
| 2018 | Commonwealth Games | Gold Coast, Australia | 2nd | 400 m | 50.57 |
| 2018 | Commonwealth Games | Gold Coast, Australia | 1st | 4 × 400 m relay | 3:24.00 |
| 2018 | NACAC Championships | Toronto, Canada | 2nd | 4 × 400 m relay | 3:27.25 |
| 2019 | World Relays | Yokohama, Japan | 5th | 4 × 400 m relay | 3:28.30 |
| 2019 | Pan American Games | Lima, Peru | 14th (h) | 400 m | 54.18 |
| 2019 | World Championships | Doha, Qatar | 35th (h) | 400 m | 52.26 |
| 2019 | World Championships | Doha, Qatar | 3rd | 4 × 400 m relay | 3:22.37 |

^{1}: Competed only in the heat. ^{2}: Disqualified in the final
