= Tiffany Porter =

British-American hurdler (born 1987)

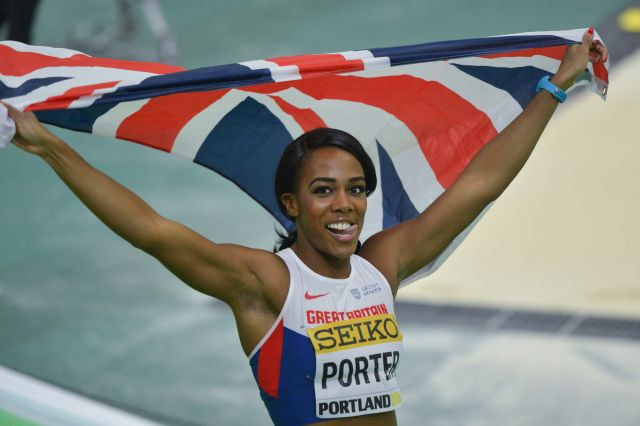
- Porter at the 2016 European Indoor Championships

Personal information
- Nationality: British, American
- Born: Tiffany Adaeze Ofili; 13 November 1987 (age 39) Ypsilanti, Michigan, United States
- Education: University of Michigan
- Height: 175 cm (5 ft 9 in)
- Weight: 68 kg (150 lb)

Sport
- Country: United Kingdom; United States
- Sport: Track and field
- Events: 60 metres hurdles 100 metres hurdles 200 metres Long jump
- College team: University of Michigan
- Club: Birchfield Harriers; Woodford Green with Essex Ladies
- Team: GB
- Turned pro: 2009
- Coached by: Rana Reider
- Retired: 2022

Achievements and titles
- Olympic finals: Rio 2016
- National finals: British Team Trials 2012/2016
- Personal bests: 60 m hurdles: 7.80 NR (2011); 100 m hurdles: 12.51 (2014); Long jump: 6.48m (2009)
Medal record
Event	1st	2nd	3rd
World Championships	0	0	1
World Indoor Championships	0	1	2
Continental Cup	0	1	0
European Championships	1	0	1
European Indoor Championships	0	1	1
Commonwealth Games	0	1	0
NACAC Championships	0	1	0
World Junior Championships	0	0	1
NACAC U-23 Championships	1	0	0
Total	2	5	5
Representing Great Britain
World Championships
Bronze medal – third place	2013 Moscow	100 m hurdles
World Indoor Championships
Silver medal – second place	2012 Istanbul	60 m hurdles
Bronze medal – third place	2014 Sopot	60 m hurdles
Bronze medal – third place	2016 Portland	60 m hurdles
Diamond League
Bronze medal – third place	2013	100 m hurdles
European Championships
Gold medal – first place	2014 Zurich	100 m hurdles
Bronze medal – third place	2016 Amsterdam	100 m hurdles
European Indoor Championships
Silver medal – second place	2011 Paris	60 m hurdles
Bronze medal – third place	2021 Torun	60 m hurdles
Representing England
Commonwealth Games
Silver medal – second place	2014 Glasgow	100 m hurdles
Representing England
Continental Cup
Silver medal – second place	2014 Marrakesh	100 m hurdles
Representing United States
NACAC Championships
Silver medal – second place	2007 San Salvador	100 m hurdles
NACAC U-23 Championships
Gold medal – first place	2008 Toluca	100 m hurdles
World Junior Championships
Bronze medal – third place	2006 Beijing	100 m hurdles

Tiffany Adaeze Porter (née Ofili; born 13 November 1987) is a track and field former athlete with joint British and American nationality who specialises in the 100 metres hurdles. She represented the United States as a junior, but began representing Great Britain in 2010 on joining the senior ranks after moving to England and competed for Great Britain at the 2012 Olympic Games in London.

Porter won a bronze medal in the 100 m hurdles at the 2013 World Championships. In 2014, she won a silver medal representing England at the Commonwealth Games. Later in 2014 she took her first major title, a gold medal at the European Championships, becoming the first British woman to win a European title in the event. Her personal best of 12.51 set in 2014 was the British record until 2022 when it was broken by Cindy Sember. She is also a two-time medallist over 60 m hurdles at the World Indoor Championships.

She is the sister of Cindy Sember, another elite-level sprint hurdler with dual British and American nationality; Sember, too, chose to represent Great Britain internationally. Unlike Porter, Sember had never represented the United States as a junior. Both sisters made the final of the 100 metre hurdles at the 2016 Summer Olympics.

== Early life ==
Tiffany Porter's father Felix is Nigerian, her mother Lalana is British of African descent. Porter was born in the United States. She has held both American and British nationality since her birth. She has therefore been eligible to represent both the United States and Great Britain. She describes herself as "proud to be American, British and Nigerian".

== NCAA ==
Tiffany (Ofili) Porter (2006–09) is a five-time NCAA national champion and All-America selection during Hall of Fame University of Michigan Wolverines women's track and field career. Ofili won three straight national crowns (2007-09) in the 100-meter hurdles.

== Athletics career ==
As an American athlete, Porter represented the United States at the inaugural NACAC Championships winning a silver medal. However, at the end of the 2010 season, she changed her allegiance to Great Britain. Commenting on her switch, she said: "I knew I was going to perform no matter what vest I had on. I have always regarded myself as British, American and Nigerian. I'm all three."

On 29 May 2011, at the Fanny Blankers-Koen Games, Porter broke Angie Thorp's 15-year-old British record of 12.80s in the 100 m Hurdles with a run of 12.77s. Thorp said that she was "devastated" at losing her record to an American-born athlete. Thorp said that she would have congratulated an established British athlete who took her record; at the time Jessica Ennis and Sarah Claxton both had personal bests of 12.81s.

Porter lowered her British record on 22 July 2011, with a time of 12.60s at the Diamond League meeting in Monaco, breaking her previous personal best of 12.73s (set when she was still a US athlete). Her record was broken on 3 August 2012 by Jessica Ennis in the London Olympics heptathlon achieving 12.54s. In September 2011 she was nominated for "European Athlete of the Year". In October 800 m runner Mariya Savinova was announced as the winner.

UK Athletics head coach, Charles van Commenee gave Porter the responsibility of the team captaincy ahead of the 2012 World Indoor Championships in March; she was subsequently labelled a "Plastic Brit" after refusing (or being unable) to recite the words of the British national anthem in a press conference.

In 2012 Porter was nominated for "European Athlete of the Month" twice. In March she was nominated along with fellow Brits Katarina Johnson-Thompson and Yamile Aldama. She was nominated again in May, this time with Hannah England and eventual winner Jessica Ennis.

In 2013 Porter switched coaches from James Henry to Rana Reider, and moved to Loughborough to train with Reider's group at Loughborough University's High Performance Centre. At the 2013 World Championships in Moscow, she won a bronze medal in the 100 m Hurdles in a personal best time of 12.55 seconds, just one hundredth of a second off Jessica Ennis' British record of 12.54.

Porter began 2014 by winning a bronze medal in the 60 m hurdles at the World Indoor Championships. Then in August, she ran 12.80 to win a silver medal in the 100 m hurdles at the Commonwealth Games in Glasgow, behind Sally Pearson of Australia. Two weeks later, she won the European Championships in Zurich, with a time of 12.76. In September 2014, at the IAAF Continental Cup, she broke the UK record with a time of 12.51 secs, finishing behind Dawn Harper-Nelson of the US.

Porter won bronze at the 2016 IAAF World Indoor Championships in Portland, Oregon and was seveneth at the 2016 Summer Olympics in Rio de Janeiro.

She took time away from athletics to have a child in 2019. On her return to the track she won a bronze medal at the 2021 European Athletics Indoor Championships in Toruń, Poland. At the delayed 2020 Summer Olympics in Tokyo, Porter finished fifth in her semi-final and therefore failed to make the final. She retired from athletics in February 2022.

== Personal life ==
Porter is the older sister of the hurdler Cindy Ofili, who also competes for Great Britain.

Porter married American hurdler Jeff Porter in May 2011, and began to compete under her married name in July 2011, initially as Tiffany Ofili-Porter, then simply as Tiffany Porter. She graduated from the University of Michigan with a PhD in pharmacology in 2012.

== International competitions ==
Year	Competition	Venue	Position	Event	Notes
Representing the United States
2006	World Junior Championships	Beijing, China	3rd	100 m hurdles	13.37 (0.0 m/s)
2007	NACAC Championships	San Salvador, El Salvador	2nd	100 m hurdles	13.27
2008	NACAC U-23 Championships	Toluca, Mexico	1st	100 m hurdles	12.82 (-0.6 m/s) A
Representing Great Britain / England
2011	European Indoor Championships	Paris, France	2nd	60 m hurdles	7.80
2011	World Championships	Daegu, South Korea	4th	100 m hurdles	12.63
2011	World Championships	Daegu, South Korea	heats	4 × 100 m relay	43.95
2012	World Indoor Championships	Istanbul, Turkey	2nd	60 m hurdles	7.94
2012	Olympic Games	London, United Kingdom	semi-final	100 m hurdles	12.79
2013	World Championships	Moscow, Russia	3rd	100 m hurdles	12.55
2014	World Indoor Championships	Sopot, Poland	3rd	60 m hurdles	7.86
2014	Commonwealth Games	Glasgow, United Kingdom	2nd	100 m hurdles	12.80
2014	European Championships	Zurich, Switzerland	1st	100 m hurdles	12.76
2014	Continental Cup	Marrakesh, Morocco	2nd	100 m hurdles	12.51
2015	World Championships	Beijing, China	5th	100 m hurdles	12.68
2016	World Indoor Championships	Portland, United States	3rd	60 m hurdles	7.90
2016	European Championships	Amsterdam, Netherlands	3rd	100 m hurdles	12.76
2016	Olympic Games	Rio de Janeiro, Brazil	7th	100 m hurdles	12.76
2017	World Championships	London, United Kingdom	29th (h)	100 m hurdles	13.18
2018	Commonwealth Games	Gold Coast, Australia	6th	100 m hurdles	13.12
2021	European Indoor Championships	Toruń, Poland	3rd	60 m hurdles	7.92
2021	Olympic Games	Tokyo, Japan	18th (sf)	100 m hurdles	12.86
