= Tyrell Cuffy =

Caymanian sprinter

Personal information
- Nationality: Cayman Islands
- Born: 6 September 1988 (age 37) Trinidad and Tobago

Sport
- Sport: Running
- Event(s): 100 metres, 200 metres

Achievements and titles
- Personal best(s): 100 m: 10.33 (Edwardsville 2008); 200 m: 20.83 (Cali 2008)
Medal record
Men's athletics
Representing the Cayman Islands
NACAC Under-23 Championships
Bronze medal – third place	2008 Toluca	4×100 m relay
Pan American Junior Championships
Silver medal – second place	2007 São Paulo	200 m
CAC Junior Championships
Bronze medal – third place	2006 Port of Spain	4×100 m relay
Island Games
Gold medal – first place	2015 Jersey	100m
Gold medal – first place	2015 Jersey	200m

Tyrell Cuffy (born 6 September 1988) is a Caymanian sprinter.

Born in Trinidad and Tobago, Cuffy moved to the Caymans at a young age, and attended John Gray High School in George Town. He then studied at King College (in Bristol, Tennessee) on an athletic scholarship, winning both the 100 and 200-metre events at the 2008 NAIA National Track Championships. Cuffy had earlier won a silver medal in the 200 metres at the 2007 Pan American Junior Athletics Championships. He has since competed for the Caymans in a number of international events and meets, notably winning two gold medals (in the 100 and 200 metres) at the 2015 Island Games.

In his youth, Cuffy also represented the national under-19 cricket team, including at the 2005 ICC Americas Under-19 Championship. His father, Theo Cuffy, played first-class cricket in Trinidad and Tobago, and came to the Cayman Islands to coach the sport.
