= 2007 Pan American Junior Athletics Championships =

XIV Pan American Junior Athletics Championships
- Dates: 6–8 July
- Host city: São Paulo, Brazil
- Venue: Estádio Ícaro de Castro Melo
- Level: Junior
- Events: 44
- Participation: about 432 athletes from 34 nations

The 14th Pan American Junior Athletics Championships were held in São Paulo, Brazil at the Estádio Ícaro de Castro Melo on July 6 to July 8, 2007. A detailed report on the results was given.

== Participation (unofficial) ==
Detailed result lists can be found on the CACAC, on the CBAt, on the Tilastopaja, on the USA Track & Field, and on the "World Junior Athletics History" website. An unofficial count yields the number of about 432 athletes from about 34 countries: Anguilla (2), Argentina (20), Bahamas (12), Barbados (9), Bermuda (3), Bolivia (2), Brazil (70), British Virgin Islands (1), Canada (45), Cayman Islands (3), Chile (17), Colombia (28), Costa Rica (1), Cuba (9), Dominica (2), Dominican Republic (3), Ecuador (17), El Salvador (3), Guatemala (5), Guyana (3), Jamaica (22), Mexico (17), Netherlands Antilles (2), Panama (1), Paraguay (9), Peru (7), Puerto Rico (8), Saint Kitts and Nevis (7), Saint Lucia (1), Trinidad and Tobago (20), United States (60), Uruguay (2), U.S. Virgin Islands (2), Venezuela (19).

== Medal summary ==
Medal winners are published. Complete results can be found on the CACAC website, on the CBAt website, on the USA Track & Field website, on the Tilastopaja website, and on the "World Junior Athletics History" website.

=== Men ===
Event	Gold		Silver		Bronze	
100 m (Wind: −1.1 m/s)	Keston Bledman (TRI)	10.32	Yohan Blake (JAM)	10.34	Arthur Wims (USA)	10.40
200 m (Wind: −0.9 m/s)	Arthur Wims (USA)	20.80	Tyrell Cuffy (CAY)	20.83	Dax Danns (GUY)	21.20
400 m	Bryshon Nellum (USA)	45.40	Zwede Hewitt (TRI)	46.04	Ade Alleyne-Forte (TRI)	46.27
800 m	Andrew Heaney (CAN)	1:48.52	Jamaal James (TRI)	1:48.87	Jonathan Moore (USA)	1:49.17
1500 m	Matthew Centrowitz, Jr. (USA)	3:56.63	Andrew Acosta (USA)	3:56.64	Diego Borrego (MEX)	3:56.87
5000 m	Diego Borrego (MEX)	14:33.16	Elliott Heath (USA)	14:34.06	Robson Pereira de Lima (BRA)	14:34.23
10,000 m	Kenneth Klotz (USA)	31:04.57	Jefferson Peña (COL)	31:06.05	Ademilson de Moraes Santana (BRA)	31:28.28
110 m hurdles (Wind: +0.9 m/s)	Johnny Dutch (USA)	13.46 =CR	Jorge McFarlane (PER)	13.51	Ryan Brathwaite (BAR)	13.61
400 m hurdles	Johnny Dutch (USA)	50.82	Jason Perez (USA)	51.22	Juan Pablo Maturana (COL)	51.38
3000 m steeplechase	Marvin Blanco Bompart (VEN)	9:04.38	Luís A. Orta Millan (VEN)	9:06.59	Osmani Calzado Mayan (CUB)	9:08.19
4×100 m relay	United States (USA); Arthur Wims; Shane Crawford; Kyle Stevenson; Jonathon Williams	39.43	Trinidad and Tobago (TRI); Abiola Glasgow; Kendal Bacchus; Kervin Morgan; Keston Bledman	40.11	Colombia (COL); Jhon Riascos; Álvaro Gómez; Vladimir Valencia; Juan Pablo Maturana	40.40
4×400 m relay	Trinidad and Tobago (TRI); Zwede Hewitt; Jovon Toppin; Kervin Morgan; Ade Alleyne-Forte	3:05.70	United States (USA); Robert Simmons; Christopher Ward; Johnny Dutch; Bryshon Nellum	3:06.15	Jamaica (JAM); Denard Coote; Ryker Hylton; Andre Peart; Yohan Blake	3:06.17
10,000 m race walk	Mauricio José Arteaga (ECU)	43:30.64	Victor Hugo Mendoza (ESA)	43:57.74	Dejaime Cesar de Oliveira (BRA)	44:09.01
High jump	Jamaal Wilson (BAH)	2.11 m	Kevin Snyder (USA)	2.08 m	Felipe Lobo Ribeiro (BRA)	2.05 m
Pole vault	Scott Roth (USA)	5.30 m	Jordan Scott (USA)	5.10 m	Rodrigo Tenorio (CHI)	4.70 m
Long jump	Jorge McFarlane (PER)	7.59 m (0.1 m/s)	Julian Reid (JAM)	7.55 m (0.3 m/s)	Diego Ferrin (ECU)	7.44 m (0.1 m/s)
Triple jump	Héctor Dairo Fuentes (CUB)	16.61 m (0.0 m/s)	Zuheir Sharif (USA)	16.23 m (0.9 m/s)	Kyron Blaise (TRI)	15.81 m (0.6 m/s)
Shot put	Nicholas Robinson (USA)	18.60 m	Raymond Brown (JAM)	18.33 m	Justin Greif (CAN)	18.20 m
Discus throw	Luke Bryant (USA)	59.45 m	Nicholas Robinson (USA)	55.93 m	Osmel Charlot Cardosa (CUB)	54.80 m
Hammer throw	Walter Henning (USA)	69.89 m	Marco Requena Caraballo (PUR)	63.65 m	Wilfredo de Jesus (PUR)	63.15 m
Javelin throw	Victor Fatecha (PAR)	75.43 m CR	Christopher Hill (USA)	71.87 m	Juan Jose Méndez (MEX)	70.68 m
Decathlon	Diego dos Santos Pereira de Araújo (BRA)	7100	Nicholas Adcock (USA)	7074	José Matagira (COL)	6778

=== Women ===
Event	Gold		Silver		Bronze	
100 m (Wind: +0.8 m/s)	Lynne Layne (USA)	11.24 CR	Rosângela Santos (BRA)	11.44	Schillonie Calvert (JAM)	11.47
200 m (Wind: +0.5 m/s)	Bianca Knight (USA)	23.17	Schillonie Calvert (JAM)	23.23	Samantha Henry (JAM)	23.26
400 m	Bobby-Gaye Wilkins (JAM)	51.72 CR	Jenna Martin (CAN)	51.91	Jessica Beard (USA)	51.91
800 m	LaTavia Thomas (USA)	2:06.59	Jessica Smith (CAN)	2:07.27	Sheila Reid (CAN)	2:08.13
1500 m	Jessica Pixler (USA)	4:21.09	Lindsay Carson (CAN)	4:24.06	Yudisleidis Fuentes Canet (CUB)	4:24.92
3000 m	Nicole Blood (USA)	9:22.35	Marie-Louise Asselin (CAN)	9:26.09	Jessica O'Connell (CAN)	9:56.33
5000 m	Marie-Louise Asselin (CAN)	17.40.28	Milena Pérez (CUB)	17:46.38	Emily Sisson (USA)	17.47.81
100 m hurdles (Wind: −0.8 m/s)	Kristi Castlin (USA)	13.02 CR	Queen Harrison (USA)	13.20	Kimberly Laing (JAM)	13.85
400 meter hurdles	Queen Harrison (USA)	56.25 CR	Janeil Bellille (TRI)	56.94	Jacquelyn Coward (USA)	57.21
3000 m steeplechase	Danelle Woods (CAN)	10:13.98	Milena Pérez (CUB)	10:20.93	Kauren Tarver (USA)	10:52.08
4×100 m relay	United States (USA); Kenyanna Wilson; Shataya Hendricks; Madison McNarry; Lynne Layne	43.71	Brazil (BRA); Ana Cláudia Lemos da Silva; Bárbara da Silva Leôncio; Franciela das Graças Krasucki; Rosângela Cristina Oliveira Santos	43.98	Trinidad and Tobago (TRI); Britney St. Louis; Semoy Hackett; Sade St. Louis; Nyoka Giles	44.69
4×400 m relay	United States (USA); Brandi Cross; Latavia Thomas; Brehanna Jacobs; Jessica Beard	3:29.67 CR	Trinidad and Tobago (TRI); Janeil Bellille; Sade St. Louis; Afiya Walker; Britney St. Louis	3:35.28	Jamaica (JAM); Andrea Reid; Schillonie Calvert; Samantha Henry; Alicia Cutenar	3:42.17
10,000 m race walk	Ingrid Hernández (COL)	48.48.24 CR	Lauren Forgues (USA)	51.43.43	Fariluz Morales (PER)	54:39:28
High jump	Lesyani Mayor (CUB)	1.85 m	Patience Coleman (USA)	1.79 m	Daiana Sturtz (ARG)	1.73 m
Pole vault	Alicia Rue (USA)	4.20 m CR	Gabriella Duclos-Lasnier (CAN)	4.15 m	Keisa Monterola (VEN)	4.10 m
Long jump	Jamesha Youngblood (USA)	6.40 m (+0.9 m/s)	Bianca Stuart (BAH)	6.12 m (+2.2 m/s)	Arantxa King (BER)	6.10 m (−1.1 m/s)
Triple jump	Ke'Nyia Richardson (USA)	13.55 m (+1.3 m/s)	Kimberly Williams (JAM)	13.38 m (+3.7 m/s)	Ashika Charan (USA)	12.87 m (+1.5 m/s)
Shot put	Natalia Ducó (CHI)	16.40 m	Nneka Ugochukwu (USA)	14.52 m	Renata Tavares Severiano (BRA)	13.96 m
Discus throw	Emily Pendleton (USA)	49.09 m	Samanatha Musil (USA)	46.50 m	Luz Montaño (COL)	45.20 m
Hammer throw	Marynna Dias (BRA)	60.26 m	Arianni Vichy (CUB)	59.46 m	Heather Steacy (CAN)	54.49 m
Javelin throw	Jucilene de Lima (BRA)	49.42 m	Katryna Subeldía (PAR)	46.41 m	Marissa Tschida (USA)	44.82 m
Heptathlon	Brianne Theisen (CAN)	5413	Shana Woods (USA)	5307	Giovana Aparecida Cavaleti (BRA)	4957

== Medal table ==
The medal count has been published.

* Host nation (Brazil)

Rank	Nation	Gold	Silver	Bronze	Total
1	United States	24	16	8	48
2	Canada	4	5	4	13
3	Brazil*	3	2	6	11
4	Trinidad and Tobago	2	5	3	10
5	Cuba	2	3	3	8
6	Jamaica	1	5	5	11
7	Venezuela	1	2	1	4
8	Colombia	1	1	4	6
9	Peru	1	1	1	3
10	Bahamas	1	1	0	2
10	Paraguay	1	1	0	2
12	Mexico	1	0	2	3
13	Chile	1	0	1	2
13	Ecuador	1	0	1	2
15	Cayman Islands	0	1	0	1
15	El Salvador	0	1	0	1
17	Argentina	0	0	1	1
17	Barbados	0	0	1	1
17	Bermuda	0	0	1	1
17	Guyana	0	0	1	1
17	Puerto Rico	0	0	1	1
Totals (21 entries)		44	44	44	132
