= Rob Novak =

American 800m runner

Personal information
- Nationality: American
- Born: March 20, 1986 (age 40) Burlington County, New Jersey, U.S.

Sport
- Sport: Track
- Events: 800 meters, 1500 meters
- College team: Seton Hall
- Club: NYAC

Achievements and titles
- Personal bests: 800 meters: 1:46.01; 1500 meters: 3:40.90
Medal record
Men's athletics
Representing United States
NACAC U23 Championships
Gold medal – first place	2008 Toluca	800 meters

Rob Novak (born March 20, 1986) is an American runner who specialized in the 800 meters. He represented the United States at the 2008 NACAC U23 Championships, where he placed first overall in the men's 800 meters. He ran at the 2012 US Olympic Trials.

== Running career ==
=== High school ===
Novak attended Bordentown Regional High School, graduating in 2005. In his freshman year, he ran 4:52 in a 1600-meter trial in his gym class. He had a background in American football, in which he played for Bordentown as wide receiver. At one point before high school he was diagnosed with asthma.

=== Collegiate ===
Novak attended Seton Hall University with a track scholarship. There he would be coached by John Marshall, who was also an 800-meter runner at Plainfield High School in the 1980s and would go on to compete at the 1984 Summer Olympics. While at college, he was called up by the US national team to compete at the 2008 NACAC U23 Championships in Toluca, Mexico, where he would go on to win the men's 800 meters.

=== Post-collegiate ===
After his spell at Seton Hall, Novak trained and competed with New York Athletic Club. He ran sat the 2012 US Olympic Trials and made it to the semi-final round of the men's 800 meters, where he placed 13th of 16 competitors.
