= Sam Effah =

Canadian sprinter (born 1988)

Personal information
- Born: December 29, 1988 (age 37) Calgary, Alberta, Canada
- Height: 176 cm (5 ft 9 in)
- Weight: 83 kg (183 lb)

Sport
- Sport: Running
- Events: 50 metres, 60 metres, 100 metres, 200 metres, 300 metres
- College team: Calgary
Medal record
Men's athletics
Representing Canada
NACAC U-23 Championships
Gold medal – first place	2010 Miramar	100 meters

Sam Effah (born December 29, 1988) is a Canadian sprinter. At the 2009 Canada Games, Effah won the gold medal in the 200 m.

== Early life ==
Effah was born in Calgary, Alberta, on December 29, 1988, to parents who emigrated from Ghana.

== Collegiate career ==
Effah attended and completed at the University of Calgary. Effah has a master's degree in management, innovation and entrepreneurship from Queen's University at Kingston.

== Statistics ==
=== Personal bests ===
Event	Time (seconds)	Venue	Date
50 metres	5.67	Saskatoon, Saskatchewan, Canada	February 3, 2011
60 metres	6.57	Windsor, Ontario, Canada	March 11, 2010
100 metres	10.06	Miramar, Florida, United States	July 9, 2010
200 metres	20.65	Charlottetown, P.E.I., Canada	August 27, 2009
300 metres	33.30	Winnipeg, Manitoba, Canada	February 6, 2010

== Filmography ==
=== Television ===
Year	Title	Role	Notes
2019	The Amazing Race Canada	Himself	2nd Place Alongside Sarah Wells
