= Samantha Henry-Robinson =

Jamaican sprinter (born 1988)

Personal information
- Born: 25 September 1988 (age 37) Kingston, Jamaica
Medal record
Women's athletics
Representing Jamaica
Olympic Games
Silver medal – second place	2012 London	4 × 100 m relay
World Relay Championships
Silver medal – second place	2014 Nassau	4 × 100 m relay
Silver medal – second place	2015 Nassau	4 × 200 m relay
Pan American Games
Silver medal – second place	2015 Toronto	4 × 100 m relay
World Youth Championships
Silver medal – second place	2003 Sherbrooke	Medley relay
NACAC U-23 Championships
Silver medal – second place	2010 Miramar	100 m
Silver medal – second place	2010 Miramar	4 × 400 meters
Bronze medal – third place	2008 Toluca	100 m
Representing Americas
Continental Cup
Gold medal – first place	2014 Marrakesh	4 × 100 m relay

Samantha Henry-Robinson (born 25 September 1988) is a Jamaican sprinter. She won a silver medal in the 4 × 100 relay at the 2012 Summer Olympics in London, where she competed in the heats but not the final. Henry-Robinson was born in Kingston, Jamaica.

Henry competed for the LSU Lady Tigers track and field team in the NCAA, where she was an All-American.
