= Leslie Cole (sprinter) =

American sprint athlete

Personal information
- Born: 16 February 1987 (age 39) Idabel, Oklahoma, United States

Sport
- Sport: Track and field
- Club: Oklahoma Sooners
Medal record
Athletics
Representing United States
World Indoor Championships
Silver medal – second place	2012 Istanbul	4x400 m relay
NACAC Under-23 Championships
Gold medal – first place	2008 Toluca	200 m

Leslie Cole (born February 16, 1987) is an American sprint athlete. She was part of the USA team that won the silver medal at the 2012 IAAF World Indoor Championships.
