= J-Mee Samuels =

American sprinter (born 1987)

Personal information
- Born: May 20, 1987 (age 39) Winston-Salem, North Carolina, U.S.
- Height: 5 ft 7 in (1.70 m)
- Weight: 168 lb (76 kg)

Sport
- Sport: Running
- College team: Arkansas Razorbacks

Achievements and titles
- Personal bests: 100m: 10.03 (Nottwil 2010); 200m: 20.32 (Fayetteville 2008)
Medal record
Men's athletics
Representing the United States
Pan American Games
Bronze medal – third place	2007 Rio de Janeiro	4×100 m relay
Pan American Junior Championships
Gold medal – first place	2005 Windsor	100 m
Gold medal – first place	2005 Windsor	4×100 m relay

J-Mee Samuels (born May 20, 1987) is an American sprinter who specializes in the 100 meters. He participated for the United States at the 2007 World Championships in Athletics, running in the 100 meters and 4 × 100 metres relay.

Samuels attended Mount Tabor High School in Winston-Salem, North Carolina, where he became the National High School record holder for 100 meters in 10.08 seconds at the Russell Blunt East Coast Invitational, matching the American Junior Record set by 2004 Olympic gold medalist Justin Gatlin in 2001. He also ran a 200-meter dash time of 20.32, which was the sixth-fastest ever by a U.S. prep athlete. Samuels was named to USA Today's All-USA track team in 2005. He was also Track and Field News "High School Athlete of the Year" in 2005.

He attended the University of Arkansas and was a three-time All-American selection.

Samuels improved his 100 m personal record to 10.03 seconds in August 2010, finishing third at the Spitzenleichtathletik meet in Nottwil, Switzerland, behind Nesta Carter and Walter Dix.

== Personal bests ==
Event	Time (seconds)	Venue	Date
60 meters	6.63	Lexington, Kentucky	March 1, 2009
100 meters	10.03	Luzern, Switzerland	August 8, 2010
200 meters	20.32	Albuquerque, New México	June 4, 2005

Awards
Preceded by Galen Rupp	Track & Field News High School Boys Athlete of the Year; 2005	Succeeded by Walter Henning
