= 2008 NACAC U23 Championships in Athletics =

V NACAC Under-23 Championships in Athletics
- Dates: July 18–20
- Host city: Toluca, Mexico
- Venue: Estadio Universitario Alberto Chivo Cordova
- Level: U-23
- Participation: 258 athletes from 19 nations

The 5th NACAC Under-23 Championships in Athletics were held in Toluca, Mexico, at the Alberto "Chivo" Córdova Stadium at the Universidad Autónoma del Estado de México on July 18–20, 2008. A detailed report on the results was given.

== Medal summary ==
The gold medal winners were published. Detailed results can be found on the Athletics Canada website, on the CACAC website, on the MileSplit website, and on the Tilastopaja website.

=== Men ===
| Event | Gold | | Silver | | Bronze | |
|---|---|---|---|---|---|---|
| 100 metres (+0.3 m/s) | J-Mee Samuels (USA) | 10.09 CR | Evander Wells (USA) | 10.15 | Rolando Palacios (HON) | 10.22 NR |
| 200 metres (-0.9 m/s) | Evander Wells (USA) | 20.34 CR | Rolando Palacios (HON) | 20.40 NR | Sam Effah (CAN) | 20.95 |
| 400 metres | LeJerald Betters (USA) | 44.75 CR | Tabarie Henry (ISV) | 45.37 NR | Jamil Hubbard (USA) | 45.96 |
| 800 metres | Rob Novak (USA) | 1:50.22 | Tayron Reyes (DOM) | 1:50.31 | Carlos Phillips (USA) | 1:50.51 |
| 1500 metres | Josué Ramírez (MEX) | 3:51.52 | Andrew Acosta (USA) | 3:52.17 | Diego Alberto Borrego (MEX) | 3:55.70 |
| 5000 metres | José Mireles (MEX) | 15:10.96 | Aldo Saúl Vega (MEX) | 15:22.32 | Estuardo Palacios (GUA) | 16:07.87 |
| 10000 metres | Ismael Apolo Mondragón (MEX) | 32:10.86 | Isaul Hernández (MEX) | 32:34.51 | Geremías Saloj (GUA) | 33:49.30 |
| 3000 m steeplechase | Josafath González (MEX) | 9:15.04 | Kyle Heath (USA) | 9:24.52 | Aroon Arías (MEX) | 9:38.82 |
| 110 m hurdles (-1.0 m/s) | Jason Richardson (USA) | 13.32 CR | Ryan Brathwaite (BAR) | 13.50 | Ronnie Ash (USA) | 13.72 |
| 400 m hurdles | Justin Gaymon (USA) | 49.50 | Nic Robinson (USA) | 50.74 | Camilo Quevedo (GUA) | 51.92 |
| High jump | Joe Kindred (USA) | 2.27m =CR | Darwin Edwards (LCA) | 2.23m NR | Jamal Wilson (BAH) | 2.23m |
| Pole vault | Jordan Scott (USA) | 5.50m | Mitch Greeley (USA) | 5.20m | Taylor Petrucha (CAN) | 5.10m |
| Long jump | Matt Turner (USA) | 7.96m | Andre Black (USA) | 7.83m | Carlos Jorge (DOM) | 7.61m |
| Triple jump | Andre Black (USA) | 15.91 (1.2 m/s) | Nkosinza Balumbu (USA) | 15.78 (-1.8 m/s) | Carl Morgan (CAY) | 15.76 (0.9 m/s) |
| Shot Put | Ryan Whiting (USA) | 19.46m | John Hickey (USA) | 17.97m | Raymond Brown (JAM) | 16.95m |
| Discus Throw | Matt Lamb (USA) | 58.70m | Ryan Whiting (USA) | 53.47m | Adonson Shallow (VIN) | 50.91m |
| Hammer throw | Sean Steacy (CAN) | 65.30m | John Freeman (USA) | 63.70m | Matt Wauters (USA) | 59.61m |
| Javelin throw | Chris Hill (USA) | 80.51m CR | Corey White (USA) | 78.52m | Juan José Méndez (MEX) | 69.67m |
| Decathlon | Raven Cepeda (USA) | 7504 pts CR | Nick Adcock (USA) | 7354 pts | Reid Gustavson (CAN) | 6959 pts |
| 20000 m Walk | Éder Sánchez (MEX) | 1:30:46.78 | David Mejía (MEX) | 1:31:41.19 | Aníbal Paau (GUA) | 1:35:38.20 |
| 4 x 100 metres relay | United States; Jeremy Hall; Teddy Williams; Chris Dykes; J-Mee Samuels | 38.39 CR | Canada; Shannon King; Adam Johnson; Gavin Smellie; Sam Effah | 39.31 | Cayman Islands; Adolphus Rhymiech; Tyrell Cuffy; Carlos Morgan; Carl Morgan | 39.68 NR |
| 4 x 400 metres relay | Jamaica; Riker Hylton; Teo Bennett; Michael Mason; Tarik Edwards | 3:05.61 | Dominican Republic; Kelvin Herrera; Tayron Reyes; Joel Hernández; Orlando Frías | 3:05.80 | Mexico; Javier Mahonri Carrasco; Erick García; Osvaldo Chávez; Víctor Antonio Gómez | 3:13.83 |

=== Women ===
| Event | Gold | | Silver | | Bronze | |
|---|---|---|---|---|---|---|
| 100 metres (+0.3 m/s) | Schillonie Calvert (JAM) | 11.24 CR | Tawanna Meadows (USA) | 11.36 | Samantha Henry (JAM) | 11.39 |
| 200 metres (-1.2 m/s) | Leslie Cole (USA) | 22.92 | Schillonie Calvert (JAM) | 23.33 | Mariely Sánchez (DOM) | 23.50 NR |
| 400 metres | Bobby-Gaye Wilkins (JAM) | 51.34 | Anastasia Le-Roy (JAM) | 52.21 | Jenna Martin (CAN) | 52.45 |
| 800 metres | Geena Gall (USA) | 2:10.32 | Lemlem Beriket (CAN) | 2:10.64 | Cristina Guevara (MEX) | 2:10.93 |
| 1500 metres | Nicole Edwards (CAN) | 4:36.27 | Lauren Hagans (USA) | 4:36.50 | Anayeli Navarro (MEX) | 4:48.86 |
| 5000 metres | Gwen Jorgensen (USA) | 18:04.56 | | | | |
| 10000 metres | Meghan Armstrong (USA) | 37:31.28 CR | Morgan Haws (USA) | 37:33.42 | | |
| 3000 m steeplechase | Nicole Bush (USA) | 10:42.17 | Bridget Franek (USA) | 11:12.65 | Carolyn Ellis (CAN) | 11:49.78 |
| 100 m hurdles (-0.6 m/s) | Tiffany Ofili (USA) | 12.82 CR | Kristi Castlin (USA) | 13.21 | Latoya Greaves (JAM) | 13.51 |
| 400 m hurdles | Nickiesha Wilson (JAM) | 55.78 CR | Nicole Leach (USA) | 57.05 | Yolanda Osana (DOM) | 58.74 |
| High jump | Jillian Drouin (CAN) | 1.85m | Becky Christensen (USA) | 1.82m | Fabiola Elizabeth Ayala (MEX) | 1.79m |
| Pole vault | Katie Stripling (USA) | 4.35m CR | Heather Hamilton (CAN) | 4.00m | Leah Vause (CAN) | 4.00m |
| Long jump | Jeomi Maduka (USA) | 6.66m CR | Natasha Harvey (USA) | 6.56m | Bianca Stuart (BAH) | 6.37m |
| Triple jump | Crystal Manning (USA) | 13.52m | Tamara Highsmith (USA) | 13.11m | Shara Proctor (AIA) | 13.11m |
| Shot Put | Sarah Stevens (USA) | 16.04m | Keisha Walkes (BAR) | 15.98m | Aja Evans (USA) | 15.34m |
| Discus Throw | D'Andra Carter (USA) | 52.92m | Annie Hess (USA) | 52.13m | Iraís Estrada (MEX) | 46.02m |
| Hammer throw | Sarah Stevens (USA) | 62.79m | Loren Groves (USA) | 61.45m | Aline Huerta (MEX) | 52.77m |
| Javelin throw | Liz Gleadle (CAN) | 51.76m | Ruby Radocaj (USA) | 50.72m | Katie Coronado (USA) | 49.41m |
| Heptathlon | Jillian Drouin (CAN) | 5714 pts | Bettie Wade (USA) | 5511 pts | Marrissa Harris (USA) | 5509 pts |
| 10000 m Walk | Maria Pérez (MEX) | 49:50.63 | Tatiana González (MEX) | 49:57.22 | Le'erin Voss (USA) | 55:39.66 |
| 4 x 100 metres relay | United States; Jessica Onyepunuka; Tawanna Meadows; Lynne Layne; Scottesha Miller | 43.64 | Jamaica; Samantha Henry; Latoya Greaves; Schillonie Calvert; Anastasia Le-Roy | 43.73 | Dominican Republic; Fany Chalas; Yolanda Osana; Wendy Reynoso; Mariely Sánchez | 46.23 |
| 4 x 400 metres relay | Jamaica; Christine Day; Bobby-Gaye Wilkins; Anastasia Le-Roy; Nickiesha Wilson | 3:27.46 CR | United States; Brandi Cross; Kenyata Coleman; Danielle Brown; Nicole Leach | 3:28.25 | Canada; Jenna Martin; Nicole Edwards; Lemlem Beriket; Amonn Nelson | 3:35.26 |

== Medal table (unofficial) ==
* Host nation (Mexico)

| Rank | Nation | Gold | Silver | Bronze | Total |
|---|---|---|---|---|---|
| 1 | United States (USA) | 28 | 26 | 8 | 62 |
| 2 | Mexico (MEX)* | 6 | 4 | 9 | 19 |
| 3 | Canada (CAN) | 5 | 3 | 7 | 15 |
| 4 | Jamaica (JAM) | 5 | 3 | 3 | 11 |
| 5 | Dominican Republic (DOM) | 0 | 2 | 4 | 6 |
| 6 | Barbados (BAR) | 0 | 2 | 0 | 2 |
| 7 | Honduras (HON) | 0 | 1 | 1 | 2 |
| 8 | Saint Lucia (LCA) | 0 | 1 | 0 | 1 |
| 8 | U.S. Virgin Islands (VIR) | 0 | 1 | 0 | 1 |
| 10 | Guatemala (GUA) | 0 | 0 | 4 | 4 |
| 11 | Bahamas (BAH) | 0 | 0 | 2 | 2 |
| 11 | Cayman Islands (CAY) | 0 | 0 | 2 | 2 |
| 13 | Commonwealth Games Federation (CGF) | 0 | 0 | 1 | 1 |
| 13 | Saint Vincent and the Grenadines (VIN) | 0 | 0 | 1 | 1 |
| Totals (14 entries) | | 44 | 43 | 42 | 129 |

== Participation (unofficial) ==
20 countries are reported to participate. However, an unofficial count through the result lists resulted in 258 participating athletes from only 19 countries:

- Anguilla (1)
- Bahamas (7)
- Barbados (6)
- Belize (4)
- Canada (22)
- Cayman Islands (5)
- Costa Rica (7)
- Dominican Republic (22)
- Guatemala (9)
- Haiti (1)
- Honduras (4)
- Jamaica (20)
- Mexico (63)
- Netherlands Antilles (2)
- Saint Kitts and Nevis (2)
- Saint Lucia (2)
- Saint Vincent and the Grenadines (3)
- United States (74)
- U.S. Virgin Islands (4)
