= Ronnie Ash =

American hurdler (born 1988)

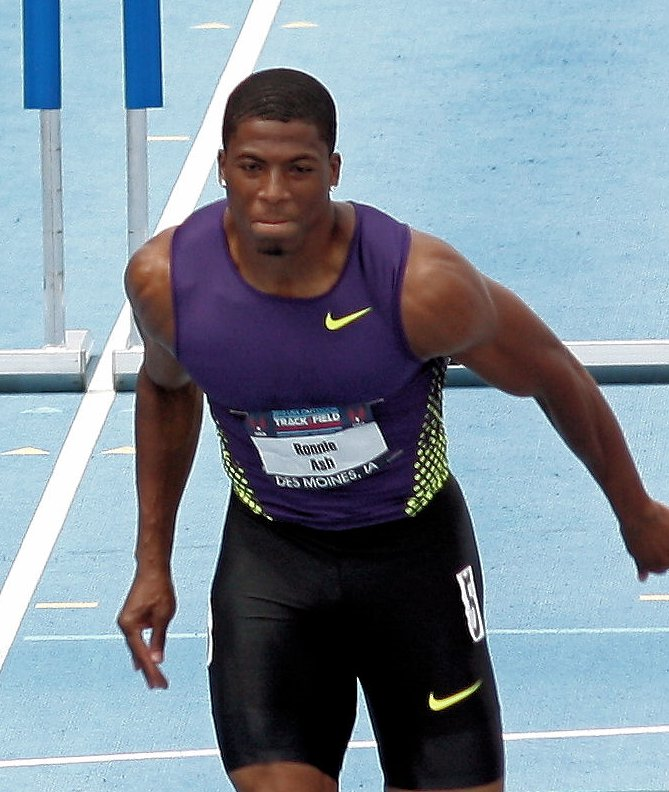

Personal information
- Nationality: (United States) American
- Born: July 2, 1988 (age 38) Passaic, New Jersey, U.S.
- Height: 6 ft 2 in (188 cm)
- Weight: 207 lb (94 kg)

Sport
- Sport: Running
- Event: 110 metres hurdles
- College team: Bethune-Cookman Wildcats and Oklahoma Sooners
Medal record
Men's athletics
Representing the United States
NACAC U-23 Championships
Gold medal – first place	2010 Miramar	110 meters hurdles
Bronze medal – third place	2008 Toluca	110 meters hurdles
Continental Cup
Silver medal – second place	2014 Marrakesh	110 metres hurdles

Ronnie Ash (born July 2, 1988) is an American track and field athlete specializing in hurdles. With his 12.99 (+1.2) 110 metres hurdles on June 29, 2014, in a semi-final round of the USA Outdoor Track and Field Championships in Sacramento, California, he moved into the prestigious sub 13 club and is currently the 17th fastest hurdler in history.

Ash did not finish in the final. Later in the season, Ash was silver medalist at the 2014 IAAF Continental Cup, selected to the team because his time held up as the #2 time from the countries that make up the Americas team for the season.

He reached the 2016 Olympic final and was in contention for a medal before stumbling over the final hurdle and falling. He was ultimately disqualified for an illegal hurdle clearance under then IAAF rule 168.7b.

== Career ==
Born and raised in Passaic, New Jersey, Ash began hurdling at Knightdale High School in Knightdale, North Carolina after transferring to the school for his senior year. With virtually no athletic experience, he was recruited by the basketball coach and track coach David Castell. He joined the track team because "I thought I could meet new people, and I guess it ended up working out." He set school records in the 110 metres hurdles, 300 meters hurdles and the high jump. Graduating in 2008, he had the opportunity to run in the 2008 NACAC Under-23 Championships in Athletics, where he captured a bronze medal behind future world champions Jason Richardson and Ryan Brathwaite.

Ash did not have high expectations coming out of high school, not planning on attending college, but he received an offer at Bethune-Cookman University. At Bethune-Cookman, he won both the 2009 NCAA Men's Indoor Track and Field Championship and the NCAA Men's Outdoor Track and Field Championship as a sophomore, outdoors over Richardson.

The following season he switched to the University of Oklahoma, defending his indoor championship and finishing third outdoors. A couple of weeks later, he finished third at the 2010 USA Outdoor Track and Field Championships. Later that summer he returned to the 2010 NACAC Under-23 Championships in Athletics, this time taking gold ahead of then defending world champion Brathwaite and running sub-13 for the first time, with a 12.98. The wind was +3.1 mps, well over the legal limit, so the time couldn't count for record purposes, but foretold of his capability.
