= Ryan Brathwaite =

Barbadian hurdler

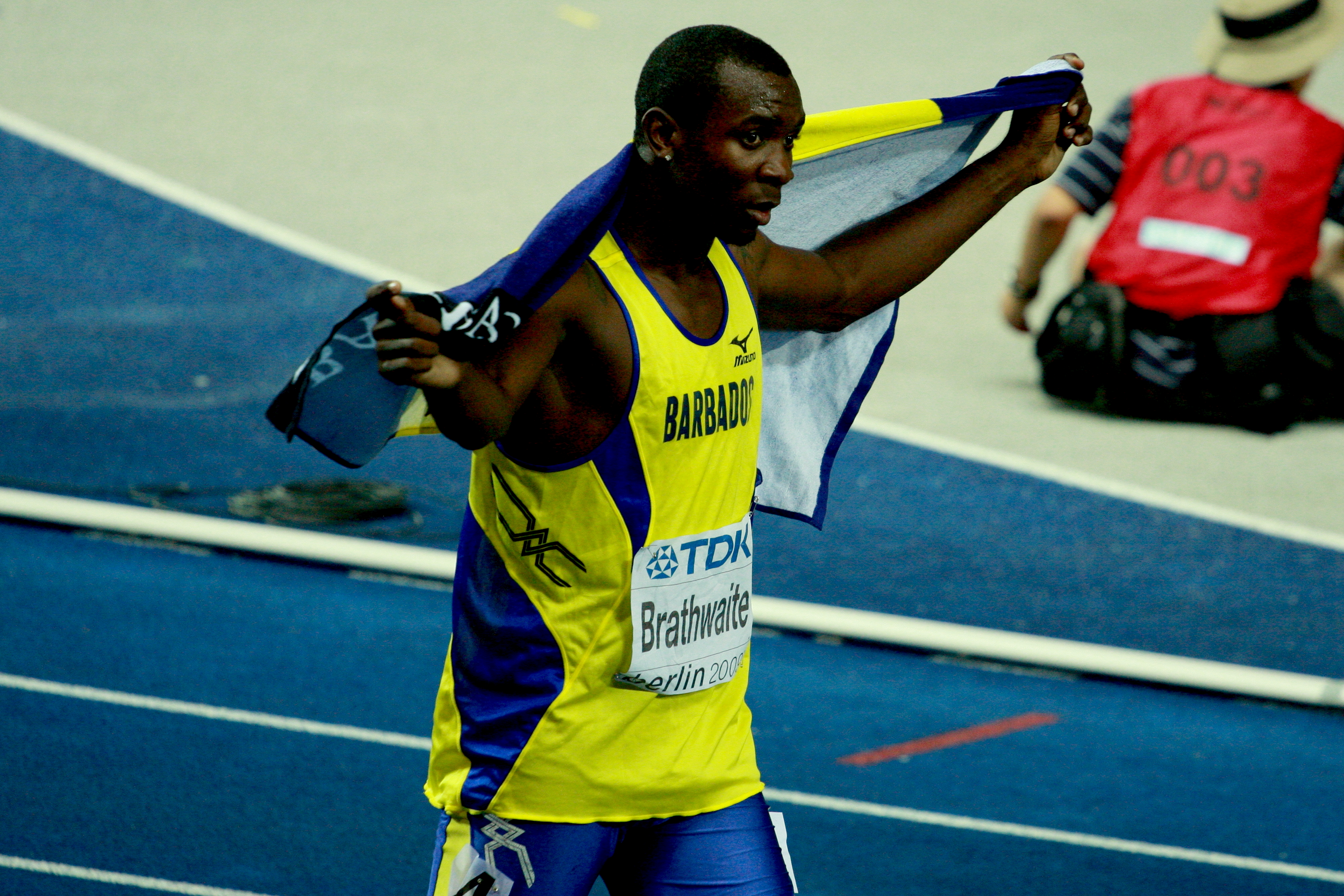

Personal information
- Nationality: Barbados
- Born: June 6, 1988 (age 38) Hillaby, St. Andrew
- Height: 1.85 m (6 ft 1 in)
- Weight: 77 kg (170 lb)

Sport
- Sport: Running
- Event: 110 metres hurdles
- College team: Barton County Community College

Achievements and titles
- Personal best: 110 m h: 13.14 s (Berlin 2009)
Medal record
Representing Barbados
Men's athletics
World Championships
| Gold medal – first place | 2009 Berlin | 110 m hurdles |
Central American and Caribbean Games
| Gold medal – first place | 2010 Mayagüez | 110 m hurdles |
CAC Championships
| Silver medal – second place | 2009 Havana | 110 m hurdles |
NACAC U-23 Championships
| Silver medal – second place | 2010 Miramar | 110 m hurdles |
Pan American Junior Championships
| Bronze medal – third place | 2007 São Paulo | 110 m hurdles |
CAC Junior Championships (U20)
| Gold medal – first place | 2006 Port of Spain | 110 m hurdles |
CARIFTA Games Junior (U20)
| Gold medal – first place | 2006 Les Abymes | 110 m hurdles |
| Gold medal – first place | 2007 Providenciales | 110 m hurdles |
| Silver medal – second place | 2005 Bacolet | 110 m hurdles |
World Youth Championships
| Silver medal – second place | 2005 Marrakesh | 110 m hurdles |
CAC Junior Championships (U17)
| Gold medal – first place | 2004 Coatzacoalcos | 100 m hurdles |
- Updated on 22 January 2015

Ryan Brathwaite (born June 6, 1988) is a track and field athlete from Barbados who won the gold medal in the 110 metres hurdles at the 2009 World Championships in Athletics in Berlin. In recognition of his achievements, on September 17, 2009, Brathwaite was given the honour of being an ambassador while formally receiving the title Ambassador His Excellency Ryan Brathwaite.

He is from the Hillaby district in the parish of St. Andrew. Although he shares a birthplace, surname and speciality with Shane Brathwaite, the two are not related.

== Career ==
He first ran on the world stage at the 2005 World Youth Championships in Athletics, taking the silver medal in the 110 meter hurdles. More success came in regional competition when he won the 2006 CAC Junior Championships. He competed as a senior athlete at the 2007 World Championships in Athletics and he reached the sprint hurdles semi-finals. He also represented Barbados at the 2007 Pan American Games where he finished in fourth place.

Brathwaite set a national record at the 2008 Central American and Caribbean Championships in Athletics, winning his heat in a time of 13.49 seconds and finishing fourth in the final. He improved this further at the 2008 Summer Olympics, running 13.38 seconds in the heats. He made it through to the Olympic semi-finals before being knocked out.

He broke a championship record the following year at the 2009 CAC Championships, which he achieved in the semi-finals. However, he was beaten in the final by the reigning Olympic champion Dayron Robles. At the 2009 World Championships in Athletics, neither Robles nor the defending world champion Liu Xiang were present for the final as they withdrew due to injury. Brathwaite took advantage of this, setting a new best of 13.18 in the semi-finals, and he improved to 13.14 to win the gold and become the 2009 world champion. At 21 years old, he was the youngest ever champion for the event. After the gold medal, he won at the Memorial Van Damme meeting and closed a successful year with another gold at the 2009 IAAF World Athletics Final.

== Personal bests ==
| Event | Result | Venue | Date |
Outdoor
| 110 m hurdles | 13.14 s (wind: +0.1 m/s) | Berlin | 20 Aug 2009 |
Indoor
| 60 m hurdles | 7.61 s | New York City | 29 Jan 2010 |

== Achievements ==
| Year | Competition | Venue | Position | Event | Notes |
Representing Barbados
| 2004 | Central American and Caribbean Junior Championships (U-17) | Coatzacoalcos, Mexico | 7th (h) | 100 m | 11.71 s (wind: +1.1 m/s) |
| 2004 | Central American and Caribbean Junior Championships (U-17) | Coatzacoalcos, Mexico | 1st | 100 m hurdles (91.4 cm) | 13.20 s w (wind: +2.5 m/s) |
| 2005 | CARIFTA Games (U-20) | Bacolet, Trinidad and Tobago | 2nd | 110 m hurdles (106.7 cm) | 14.64 s (wind: -0.7 m/s) |
| 2005 | World Youth Championships | Marrakesh, Morocco | 2nd | 110 m hurdles (91.4 cm) | 13.44 s (wind: +1.1 m/s) |
| 2005 | Pan American Junior Championships | Windsor, Canada | 5th | 110m hurdles (106.7 cm) | 14.79 (wind: -1.6 m/s) |
| 2006 | CARIFTA Games (U-20) | Les Abymes, Guadeloupe | 1st | 110 m hurdles (99.0 cm) | 13.85 s CR (wind: -1.4 m/s) |
| 2006 | Central American and Caribbean Junior Championships (U-20) | Port of Spain, Trinidad and Tobago | 1st | 110 m hurdles (99.0 cm) | 13.69 s CR (wind: +1.6 m/s) |
| 2006 | World Junior Championships | Beijing, China | — | 110m hurdles (99.0 cm) | DQ |
| 2007 | CARIFTA Games (U-20) | Providenciales, Turks and Caicos Islands | 1st | 110 m hurdles (99.0 cm) | 13.42 s CR (wind: +0.2 m/s) |
| 2007 | ALBA Games | Caracas, Venezuela | 2nd | 110 m hurdles | 13.91 s (wind: +0.6 m/s) |
| 2007 | Pan American Games | Rio de Janeiro, Brazil | 4th | 110 m hurdles | 13.70 s (wind: +0.4 m/s) |
| 2007 | World Championships | Osaka, Japan | 24th (sf) | 110 m hurdles | 13.87 s (wind: -0.3 m/s) |
| 2007 | Pan American Junior Championships | São Paulo, Brazil | 3rd | 110m hurdles (99.0 cm) | 13.61 (wind: +0.9 m/s) |
| 2008 | Central American and Caribbean Championships | Cali, Colombia | 4th | 110 m hurdles | 13.66 s w (wind: +2.3 m/s) |
| 2008 | NACAC Under-23 Championships | Toluca, Mexico | 2nd | 110m hurdles | 13.50 (wind: -1.0 m/s) A |
| 2008 | Olympic Games | Beijing, China | 7th (sf) | 110 m hurdles | 13.59 s (wind: -0.4 m/s) |
| 2009 | Central American and Caribbean Championships | Havana, Cuba | 2nd | 110 m hurdles | 13.31 s w (wind: +2.5 m/s) |
| 2009 | World Championships | Berlin, Germany | 1st | 110 m hurdles | 13.14 s (wind: +0.1 m/s) NR |
| 2009 | World Athletics Final | Thessaloniki, Greece | 1st | 110m hurdles | 13.16 (wind: -0.3 m/s) |
| 2010 | NACAC Under-23 Championships | Miramar, United States | 2nd | 110 m hurdles | 13.10 s w (wind: +3.1 m/s) |
| 2010 | Central American and Caribbean Games | Mayagüez, Puerto Rico | 1st | 110 m hurdles | 13.39 s |
| 2011 | World Championships | Daegu, South Korea | 18th (h) | 110 m hurdles | 13.57 s (wind: +1.0 m/s) |
| 2012 | Olympic Games | London, United Kingdom | 5th | 110 m hurdles | 13.40 s |
| 2013 | World Championships | Moscow, Russia | 14th (sf) | 110m hurdles | 13.64 (wind: -0.3 m/s) |
| 2014 | Commonwealth Games | Glasgow, United Kingdom | 5th | 110m hurdles | 13.63 (wind: -0.3 m/s) |
| 2014 | Pan American Sports Festival | Mexico City, Mexico | 1st | 110m hurdles | 13.41 A (wind: -0.1 m/s) |

== See also ==
- Barbados at the Olympics

Olympic Games
| Preceded by Bradley Ally | Flagbearer for Barbados; London 2012 | Succeeded by Ramon Gittens |
