= 2006 CARIFTA Games =

XXXV CARIFTA Games
- Dates: April 15–17
- Host city: Les Abymes, Guadeloupe
- Venue: Stade René Serge Nabajoth
- Level: Junior and Youth
- Events: 66 (35 junior (incl. 5 open), 31 youth)
- Participation: about 524 (268 junior, 256 youth) athletes from about 25 nations
- Records set: 8 games 3 national

The 35th CARIFTA Games was held in the René Serge Nabajoth Stadium in Les Abymes, Guadeloupe on April 15–17, 2006. A detailed appraisal of the results has been given.

== Participation (unofficial) ==
Detailed result lists can be found on the CACAC, the CFPI and the "World Junior Athletics History" website. An unofficial count yields the number of about 524 athletes (268 junior (under-20) and 256 youth (under-17)) from about 25 countries: Anguilla (4), Antigua and Barbuda (11), Aruba (4), Bahamas (62), Barbados (40), Bermuda (17), British Virgin Islands (8), Cayman Islands (12), Dominica (5), French Guiana (15), Grenada (11), Guadeloupe (72), Guyana (2), Haiti (7), Jamaica (70), Martinique (45), Montserrat (3), Netherlands Antilles (12), Saint Kitts and Nevis (21), Saint Lucia (5), Saint Vincent and the Grenadines (5), Suriname (3), Trinidad and Tobago (57), Turks and Caicos Islands (26), US Virgin Islands (7).

== Records ==
A total of 8 new games records were set.

In the boys' U-20 category, Ryan Brathwaite from Barbados achieved 13.85s (-1.4 m/s) in 110 metres hurdles. The Jamaican 4x400 metres relay team set the new games record to 3:07.75.

In the girls' U-20 category, the 400 metres record was improved twice. First, to 51.82s in the heat by Kaliese Spencer, and then in the final, to 51.30s by Sonita Sutherland, both from Jamaica. Together with their teammates Sherene Pinnock and Bobby-Gaye Wilkins, they finished the 4 x 400 metres relay in the new record time of 3:31.90.

In the boys' U-17 category, Gavyn Nero of Trinidad and Tobago set two new records in 1500 metres (4:00.78) and 3000 metres (8:53.42).

In the girls' U-17 category, Jamaican Natoya Goule set also two new records in 800 metres (2:09.59) and 1500 metres (4:32.70).

Moreover, a total of 3 national (senior) records were set by the junior athletes. In the men's category, Shanovan Williams threw the javelin to the new record mark for the Turks and Caicos Islands of 49.33 metres.

In the women's category, two records for the British Virgin Islands were set by Chantel Malone in 55.70s for 400 metres, and together with the 4x400 metres relay team in 3:51.71.

== Austin Sealy Award ==
The Austin Sealy Trophy for the most outstanding athlete of the games was awarded to Gavyn Nero of Trinidad and Tobago. He won 3 gold medals (800m, 1500m and 3000m) in the youth (U-17) category, setting new 1500m and 3000m games record.

== Medal summary ==
Medal winners are published by category: Boys under 20 (Junior), Girls under 20 (Junior), Boys under 17 (Youth), and Girls under 17 (Youth). Complete results can be found on the CACAC, the CFPI and the "World Junior Athletics History" website.

=== Boys under 20 (Junior) ===
Event	Gold		Silver		Bronze	
100 metres (0.0 m/s)	Remaldo Rose (JAM)	10.48	Keston Bledman (TRI)	10.57	Ramon Gittens (BAR)	10.60
200 metres (-0.5 m/s)	Yohan Blake (JAM)	21.12	Terrance Davis Jr. (BAH)	21.22	Kervin Morgan (TRI)	21.41
400 metres	Renny Quow (TRI)	46.55	Allodin Fothergill (JAM)	47.04	(Guadeloupe) /Xavier Sorimoutou (GLP)	47.54
800 metres	Jamaal James (TRI)	1:52.64	Theon O'Connor (JAM)	1:53.66	Melvin Weller (JAM)	1:54.06
1500 metres	Bengallo Morrison (JAM)	4:01.37	Lenford Adams (JAM)	4:02.41	Neilon Joseph (GRN)	4:10.03
5000 metres^{o}	Kirk Brown (JAM)	15:57.64	Sandino Nero (TRI)	16:10.42	(Martinique) /Lorry Lucea (MTQ)	16:33.38
110 metres hurdles (-1.4 m/s)	Ryan Brathwaite (BAR)	13.85 CR	Andre Collins (JAM)	14.21	Ronnie Griffith (BAR)	14.30
400 metres hurdles	Josef Robertson (JAM)	52.47	Carlyle Thompson (BAH)	53.37	Ricardo Todd (BAR)	53.41
High jump	Jamaal Wilson (BAH)	2.05 (jump off)	Kyle Grant (BAH)	2.00	(Guadeloupe) /David Cassilingon (GLP)	2.00
Pole vault^{o}	Lorenzo Johnson (JAM)	3.80	Kriston Caraballo (TRI)	3.70		
Long jump	(Guadeloupe) /Stéphane Jumet (GLP)	7.51 (0.0 m/s)	Tarik Edwards (JAM)	7.50 (0.0 m/s)	Alain Bailey (JAM)	7.36 (0.0 m/s)
Triple jump	Robert Peddlar (JAM)	15.03 (0.0 m/s)	Jeremiah James (LCA)	14.81 (-2.0 m/s)	(Martinique) /Jérémie Varsovie (MTQ)	14.79 (0.0 m/s)
Shot put	Raymond Brown (JAM)	17.06	Tyron Benjamin (DMA)	16.53	Sharif Small (JAM)	14.89
Discus throw	Sharif Small (JAM)	51.19	Tyron Benjamin (DMA)	49.95	Andre Jones (BAR)	47.23
Javelin throw	(Guadeloupe) /Jonathan Denis (GLP)	56.61	Rohan Gill (BAR)	55.31	Kenton Olive (GRN)	54.19
Heptathlon^{o}	Joel Phillip (GRN)	5074	Kerron Brown (TRI)	4432	Kurt Felix (GRN)	4311
4 x 100 metres relay	Jamaica; Winston Barnes; Garfield German; Yohan Blake; Remaldo Rose	39.81	Barbados	40.82	Trinidad and Tobago	40.87
4 x 400 metres relay	Jamaica; Jair Francis; Allodin Fothergill; Josef Robertson; Tarik Edwards	3:07.75 CR	Bahamas; Demetrius Pinder; Juan Lewis; Carlyle Thompson; Jameson Strachan	3:08.56	Trinidad and Tobago; Renny Quow; Kervin Morgan; Darnell Greig; Zwede Hewitt	3:08.99

^{o}: Open event for both junior and youth athletes.

=== Girls under 20 (Junior) ===
Event	Gold		Silver		Bronze	
100 metres (0.7 m/s)	Schillonie Calvert (JAM)	11.51	Sheniqua Ferguson (BAH)	11.63	Semoy Hackett (TRI)	11.68
200 metres (-0.8 m/s)	Sheniqua Ferguson (BAH)	23.44	Anastasia Le-Roy (JAM)	23.54	Cache Armbrister (BAH)	23.98
400 metres	Sonita Sutherland (JAM)	51.30 CR	Kaliese Spencer (JAM)	51.99	(French Guiana) /Marie-Angélique Lacordelle (GUF)	54.22
800 metres	Bobby-Gaye Wilkins (JAM)	2:09.36	Keno Heavens (JAM)	2:10.38	(Martinique) /Emilie Ducados (MTQ)	2:12.42
1500 metres	Jodian Richards (JAM)	4:37.30	Stacey Bell (JAM)	4:38.93	Aniecia Williams (ISV)	4:54.13
3000 metres^{o}	Stacey Bell (JAM)	11:39.95	Kenryca Francis (ATG)	12:14.68	Linda Blackett (ATG)	12:20.17
100 metres hurdles (1.0 m/s)	Kimberly Laing (JAM)	13.97	Kimberly Stanford (BAR)	14.14	Karessa Farley (BAR)	14.17
400 metres hurdles	Sherene Pinnock (JAM)	57.50	Janeil Bellille (TRI)	59.76	Natalya Beneby (BAH)	60.96
High jump	La Troya Darrell (BER)	1.76	Shantel Thompson (JAM)	1.74	Caleigh Bacchus (TRI)	1.74
Long jump	Shara Proctor (AIA)	6.17 (0.0 m/s)	Arantxa King (BER)	6.07 (1.1 m/s)	Tameka Williams (SKN)	5.98 (0.0 m/s)
Triple jump	Kimberly Williams (JAM)	12.94 (-0.2 m/s)	La Troya Darrell (BER)	12.44 (0.0 m/s)	(Guadeloupe) /Lorrie Hamony (GLP)	12.39 (0.0 m/s)
Shot put	Annie Alexander (TRI)	14.88	(Martinique) /Myriam Lixfe (MTQ)	14.43	(Guadeloupe) /Stella Virolan (GLP)	13.89
Discus throw	Annie Alexander (TRI)	46.67	(Martinique) /Marie-Christine Vulcain (MTQ)	45.20	Latanya Nation (JAM)	41.40
Javelin throw	Tracey Morrison (BAH)	47.52	Taneisha Blair (JAM)	45.38	(Martinique) /Laurence Germany (MTQ)	45.34
Pentathlon^{o}	Shannise Wright (BAH)	3326	Andrea Moss (BAH)	3206	Venice Fredericks (TRI)	2700
4 x 100 metres relay	Jamaica; Samantha Henry; Anastasia Le-Roy; Schillonie Calvert; Naffene Briscoe	44.91	Bahamas; Tina Rolle; T'Shonda Webb; Cache Armbrister; Sheniqua Ferguson	45.27	Trinidad and Tobago; Jurnelle Francis; Semoy Hackett; Janeil Bellile; Reyare Thomas	45.72
4 x 400 metres relay	Jamaica; Sherene Pinnock; Kaliese Spencer; Bobby-Gaye Wilkins; Sonita Sutherland	3:31.90 CR	Trinidad and Tobago; Britney St. Louis; Karla Hope; Kelly-Ann Romeo; Janeil Bellile	3:45.13	Bahamas; Keneisha Miller; Cache Armbrister; Michelle Cumberbatch; Tyranique Thomas	3:46.30

^{o}: Open event for both junior and youth athletes.

=== Boys under 17 (Youth) ===
Event	Gold		Silver		Bronze	
100 metres (0.8 m/s)	Dexter Lee (JAM)	10.72	Joel Dillon (TRI)	10.74	Karlton Rolle (BAH)	10.77
200 metres (0.0 m/s)	Karlton Rolle (BAH)	21.33	Ramone McKenzie (JAM)	21.56	Darrion Bent (JAM)	21.58
400 metres	Akino Ming (JAM)	48.56	Jevon Matthew (TRI)	48.80	Kadeem Smith (SKN)	48.90
800 metres	Gavyn Nero (TRI)	1:54.55	Donohue Williams (JAM)	1:54.99	Maverick Weatherhead (ATG)	1:55.24
1500 metres	Gavyn Nero (TRI)	4:00.78 CR	Kemoy Campbell (JAM)	4:02.40	Conroy Crossman (JAM)	4:08.94
3000 metres	Gavyn Nero (TRI)	8:53.42 CR	Kemoy Campbell (JAM)	8:53.71	Matthew Spring (BER)	9:18.74
100 metres hurdles (0.0 m/s)	(Guadeloupe) /Mathieu Boa (GLP)	13.39	Kimarcley Henry (JAM)	13.43	Kristen Hepburn-Taylor (BAH)	13.63
400 metres hurdles	Dwight Robinson (JAM)	54.51	Kemar Norgrove (BAR)	55.44	(Guadeloupe) /Samuel Ramier (GLP)	55.59
High jump	Raymond Higgs (BAH)	2.06	Daniel Burke (BAR)	2.03	Christopher Waugh (JAM)	1.90
Long jump	Jerome Myers (JAM)	7.24 (0.0 m/s)	(Guadeloupe) /Yohan Ferré (GLP)	7.12 w (4.1 m/s)	Raymond Higgs (BAH)	6.88 (0.0 m/s)
Triple jump	Gerard Brown (BAH)	14.71 (0.0 m/s)	August Campbell (BAH)	13.90 (-1.6 m/s)	Shayon Daniels (JAM)	13.83 (0.0 m/s)
Shot put	Damion Johnson (JAM)	15.29	Omar Bryan (JAM)	14.95	Quincy Wilson (TRI)	13.65
Discus throw	Omar Bryan (JAM)	48.22	Quincy Wilson (TRI)	42.20	Ramon Burgess (BAR)	42.19
Javelin throw	Ramon Burgess (BAR)	57.97	Jerron Franklyn (TRI)	52.62	August Campbell (BAH)	52.19
4 x 100 metres relay	Jamaica; Ricardo Powell; Ramone McKenzie; Darrion Bent; Dexter Lee	41.39	Bahamas; Aaron Wilmore; Karlton Rolle; Shawn Lockhart; Warren Fraser	41.62	Trinidad and Tobago; Joel Romain; Joel Dillon; Kendall Bacchus; Shermund Allsop	42.22
4 x 400 metres relay	Jamaica; Dwight Robinson; Ramone McKenzie; Darrion Bent; Akino Ming	3:18.44	Trinidad and Tobago; Jameel Alleyne-Walcott; Le Sean Noel; Trevis Frederick; Jevon Matthew	3:19.35	Bahamas; Darion Duncombe; Jeffery Gibson; Karlton Rolle; Fenton Williams	3:19.80

=== Girls under 17 (Youth) ===
Event	Gold		Silver		Bronze	
100 metres (1.0 m/s)	Danielle Jeffrey (JAM)	11.67	Carrie Russell (JAM)	11.70	Nivea Smith (BAH)	11.90
200 metres (-0.6 m/s)	Nivea Smith (BAH)	23.66	Carrie Russell (JAM)	23.87	Cadajah Spencer (TRI)	23.91
400 metres	Latoya McDermott (JAM)	54.03	Merica Moncherry (LCA)	55.14	Chantel Malone (IVB)	55.70 NR
800 metres	Natoya Goule (JAM)	2:09.59 CR	Teneisha Davis (JAM)	2:10.81	Jessica James (TRI)	2:11.90
1500 metres	Natoya Goule (JAM)	4:32.70 CR	Teneisha Davis (JAM)	4:35.98	Linda Blackett (ATG)	4:52.39
100 metres hurdles (-2.0 m/s)	Rosemarie Carty (JAM)	13.87	Kierre Beckles (BAR)	13.90	(Martinique) /Jessica Alcan (MTQ)	14.28
300 metres hurdles	Shana-Gaye Tracey (JAM)	41.64	Kierre Beckles (BAR)	41.76	Krystal Bodie (BAH)	42.13
High jump	Misha-Gaye DaCosta (JAM)	1.75	(Guadeloupe) /Georgia Bordy (GLP)	1.68	Deandra Daniel (TRI)	1.68
Long jump	(Martinique) /Daniella Sacama-Isidore (MTQ)	5.69 (0.0 m/s)	Chantel Malone (IVB)	5.62 (0.3 m/s)	(Martinique) /Christelle Joseph (MTQ)	5.45 (0.0 m/s)
Triple jump	Yushani Durrant (JAM)	11.69 (0.0 m/s)	Chantel Malone (IVB)	11.58 (0.8 m/s)	(Guadeloupe) /Christie Opet (GLP)	10.84 (0.9 m/s)
Shot put	Hilenn James (TRI)	11.93	Deandra Dottin (BAR)	11.48	(Guadeloupe) /Laurianne Laurendot (GLP)	11.21
Discus throw	Akilah Martin (BAR)	34.02	Alexandra Terry (CAY)	32.69	Akeela Bravo (TRI)	31.90
Javelin throw	Deandra Dottin (BAR)	37.19	(Guadeloupe) /Lesly Bélair (GLP)	36.53	(Martinique) /Svelta Mondesir (MTQ)	33.91
4 x 100 metres relay	Jamaica; Kedesha Simpson; Danielle Jeffrey; Jura Levy; Carrie Russell	45.66	Bahamas; Sparkyl Cash; Nivea Smith; Carlene Johnson; Printassia Johnson	46.17	Trinidad and Tobago; Michelle-Lee Ahye; Cadajah Spencer; Cassie Caprieta; Nyoka Giles	46.21
4 x 400 metres relay	Jamaica; Shana-Gaye Tracey; LaToya McDermott; Danielle Jeffrey; Natoya Goule	3:43.65	Bahamas; Deandra Knowles; Shellyka Rolle; Rashan Brown; Nivea Smith	3:49.14	Barbados; Kierre Beckles; LaToya Griffith; Althea Maximilien; Sade Sealy	3:49.78

== Medal table (unofficial) ==
The medal count has been published. There is a mismatch between the unofficial medal count and the published medal count for the Bahamas. This can be explained by the fact that there was a jump off between Jamal Wilson and Kyle Grant, both from the Bahamas, in the Men's High Jump Under 20 competition, which is separately listed in the results and might have been counted twice.

* Host nation (Guadeloupe)

Rank	Nation	Gold	Silver	Bronze	Total
1	Jamaica (JAM)	39	21	8	68
2	Trinidad and Tobago (TTO)	8	11	14	33
3	Bahamas (BAH)	8	10	10	28
4	Barbados (BAR)	4	8	7	19
5	Guadeloupe (GLP)*	3	3	7	13
6	Martinique (MTQ)	1	2	7	10
7	Bermuda (BER)	1	2	1	4
8	Grenada (GRN)	1	0	3	4
9	Commonwealth Games Federation (CGF)	1	0	0	1
10	British Virgin Islands (IVB)	0	2	1	3
11	Dominica (DMA)	0	2	0	2
11	Saint Lucia (LCA)	0	2	0	2
13	Antigua and Barbuda (ATG)	0	1	3	4
14	Saint Kitts and Nevis (SKN)	0	1	2	3
15	Cayman Islands (CAY)	0	1	0	1
16	French Guiana (GUF)	0	0	1	1
16	U.S. Virgin Islands (VIR)	0	0	1	1
Totals (17 entries)		66	66	65	197
