= Raymond Higgs =

Bahamian long jumper

Personal information
- Born: 24 January 1991 (age 35) Freeport, Bahamas

Sport
- Country: Bahamas
- Sport: Athletics
- Events: High jump, Long jump, Triple jump
- Updated on 26 December 2014

Raymond "R.J" Higgs (born 24 January 1991) is a Bahamian long jumper. He competed in the long jump event at the 2012 Summer Olympics.

== Personal bests ==
Event	Result	Venue	Date
Outdoor
High jump	2.21 m	Nassau, Bahamas	27 June 2008
Long jump	8.15 m (wind: +0.6 m/s)	Athens, United States	14 May 2011
Triple jump	15.92 m (wind: +0.7 m/s)	Fayetteville, United States	31 May 2014
Indoor
High jump	2.16 m	Fayetteville, United States	4 March 2011
Long jump	7.99 m	Fayetteville, United States	14 February 2014
Triple jump	15.41 m	Fayetteville, United States	1 February 2014

== Achievements ==
Year	Competition	Venue	Position	Event	Notes
Representing the Bahamas
2005	CARIFTA Games (U17)	Bacolet, Trinidad and Tobago	1st	High jump	1.85 m
2006	CARIFTA Games (U17)	Les Abymes, Guadeloupe	1st	High jump	2.06 m
2006	CARIFTA Games (U17)	Les Abymes, Guadeloupe	3rd	Long jump	6.88 m (wind: 0.0 m/s)
2006	Central American and Caribbean Junior Championships (U17)	Port of Spain, Trinidad and Tobago	1st	High jump	2.02 m
2006	Central American and Caribbean Junior Championships (U17)	Port of Spain, Trinidad and Tobago	2nd	Triple jump	14.74 m (wind: 0.0 m/s)
2007	CARIFTA Games (U17)	Providenciales, Turks and Caicos Islands	1st	High jump	2.13 m
2007	CARIFTA Games (U17)	Providenciales, Turks and Caicos Islands	3rd	Long jump	6.83 m (wind: 0.0 m/s)
2007	CARIFTA Games (U17)	Providenciales, Turks and Caicos Islands	1st	Triple jump	14.79 m (wind: -2.0 m/s)
2007	World Youth Championships	Ostrava, Czech Republic	—	High jump	NH
2008	CARIFTA Games (U20)	Basseterre, Saint Kitts and Nevis	1st	High jump	2.10 m
2008	World Junior Championships	Bydgoszcz, Poland	8th	High jump	2.13 m
2009	CARIFTA Games (U20)	Vieux Fort, Saint Lucia	1st	High jump	2.21 m
2009	CARIFTA Games (U20)	Vieux Fort, Saint Lucia	2nd	Long jump	7.35 m (wind: +1.6 m/s)
2009	Central American and Caribbean Championships	Havana, Cuba	10th	High jump	1.90 m
2009	Pan American Junior Championships	Port of Spain, Trinidad and Tobago	9th	High jump	2.00 m
2010	Central American and Caribbean Junior Championships	Santo Domingo, Dominican Republic	2nd	High jump	2.11 m
2010	Central American and Caribbean Junior Championships	Santo Domingo, Dominican Republic	3rd	Long jump	7.35 m (wind: -0.4 m/s)
2010	World Junior Championships	Moncton, Canada	29th (q)	High jump	2.00 m
2010	World Junior Championships	Moncton, Canada	11th	Long jump	7.09 m (wind: -0.8 m/s)
2011	Central American and Caribbean Championships	Mayagüez, Puerto Rico	3rd	Long jump	7.75 m (wind: +1.0 m/s)
2011	World Championships	Daegu, South Korea	25th (q)	Long jump	7.72 m (wind: -0.8 m/s)
2012	Olympic Games	London, United Kingdom	21st (q)	Long jump	7.76 m (wind: +0.9 m/s)
2014	Commonwealth Games	Glasgow, United Kingdom	13th (q)	Long jump	7.61 m (wind: -0.1 m/s)
2014	Pan American Sports Festival	Mexico City, Mexico	6th	Long jump	7.76 m A (wind: +0.4 m/s)
2014	Central American and Caribbean Games	Xalapa, Mexico	4th	Long jump	7.63 m A (wind: -0.5 m/s)

Higgs competed collegiately in the United States for the University of Arkansas Razorbacks. In 2012, he won the long jump in the Southeastern Conference Outdoor Championships and finished third at the NCAA Outdoor Track and Field Championships.
