= Deandra Dottin =

Barbadian cricketer

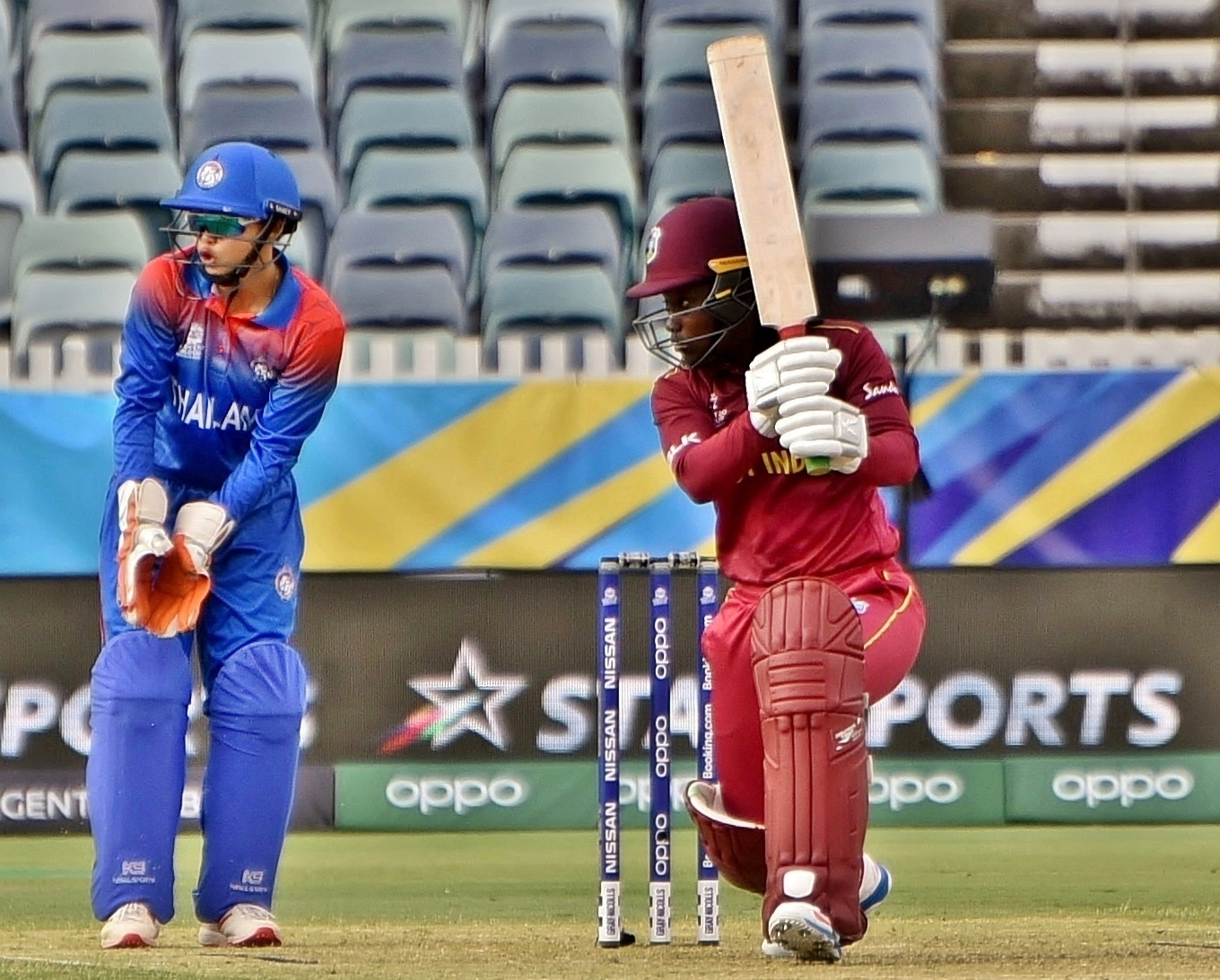
- Dottin batting for the West Indies during the 2020 ICC Women's T20 World Cup

Personal information
- Full name: Deandra Jalisa Shakira Dottin
- Born: 21 June 1991 (age 35); Barbados
- Nickname: World Boss
- Batting: Right-handed
- Bowling: Right-arm medium
- Role: All-rounder

International information
- National sides: West Indies (2008–present); Barbados (2022)
- ODI debut (cap 55): 24 June 2008; West Indies v Ireland
- Last ODI: 30 March 2022; West Indies v Australia
- ODI shirt no.: 5
- T20I debut (cap 2/4): 27 June 2008; West Indies v Ireland
- Last T20I: 18 October 2024; West Indies v New Zealand
- T20I shirt no.: 5

Domestic team information
- Years: Team
- 2008–2022: Barbados
- 2012: Trinidad and Tobago
- 2015/16: Perth Scorchers
- 2016: Lancashire Thunder
- 2016/17–2017/18: Brisbane Heat
- 2020: Trailblazers
- 2021: London Spirit
- 2022: Supernovas
- 2022–2023: North West Thunder
- 2022–present: Manchester Originals
- 2022–present: Trinbago Knight Riders
- 2022/23: Adelaide Strikers

Career statistics
Competition	WODI	WT20I
Matches	143	132
Runs scored	3,727	2,817
Batting average	30.54	26.08
100s/50s	3/22	2/12
Top score	150*	112*
Balls bowled	2,411	1,153
Wickets	72	67
Bowling average	27.19	18.32
5 wickets in innings	1	1
10 wickets in match	0	0
Best bowling	5/34	5/5
Catches/stumpings	41/–	36/–
- Source: ESPNcricinfo, 19 October 2024

Deandra Dottin
Medal record

Athletics

Representing Barbados

CAC Junior Championships (U17)
Gold medal – first place	2006 Port of Spain	Shot put
Gold medal – first place	2006 Port of Spain	Javelin throw

CARIFTA Games Junior (U20)
Gold medal – first place	2008 Basseterre	Javelin throw

CARIFTA Games Youth (U17)
Gold medal – first place	2007 Providenciales	Shot put
Gold medal – first place	2007 Providenciales	Discus throw
Gold medal – first place	2007 Providenciales	Javelin throw
Gold medal – first place	2006 Les Abymes	Javelin throw
Silver medal – second place	2006 Les Abymes	Shot put
Silver medal – second place	2005 Bacolet	Javelin throw

Deandra Jalisa Shakira Dottin (born 21 June 1991) is a Barbadian cricketer and former track and field athlete. A right-handed batter and right-arm fast bowler, Dottin made her debut for the West Indies women's cricket team in June 2008. She plays as a hard-hitting lower-order batter, and scored her first century in a Women's Twenty20 International in 2010. She played in her 100th Women's One Day International (WODI) match, when the West Indies played India in the group stage of the 2017 Women's Cricket World Cup, on 29 June 2017. She plays domestic cricket for Trinbago Knight Riders and Manchester Originals, and has previously played for Barbados, Trinidad and Tobago, Lancashire Thunder, North West Thunder, London Spirit, Perth Scorchers, Brisbane Heat, Adelaide Strikers, Trailblazers and Supernovas.

In June 2018, she was named the Women's T20 International Cricketer of the Year at the annual Cricket West Indies' Awards. In September 2018, during the series against South Africa, she became the third woman to play 100 Women's Twenty20 International (WT20I) matches. In October 2018, Cricket West Indies awarded her a women's contract for the 2018–19 season. In August 2019, she was named as both the Women's ODI and Women's T20I Player of the Year by Cricket West Indies. In September 2020, in the last match against England, Dottin became the first cricketer to hit 100 sixes in WT20Is. In July 2022, Dottin announced her retirement from international cricket.

== Early life and education ==
Dottin was born in Barbados, and spent most of her childhood in Rock Hall, a village in the parish of St Andrew. Her father died when she was 12 years old, and she was raised primarily by her mother, Melva. Dottin's brothers, grandparents and uncles all lived in Rock Hall. Another relative, her cousin Ottis Gibson, was a medium pace bowler for the West Indies in the 1990s, and has since been a coach of a number of high-profile teams.

As a young child, Dottin focused her sporting attention on track and field athletics. Initially, she was a sprinter. Over time, her specialty became the javelin throw, and she was also prominent in shot put and discus throw events. At that stage of her life, cricket was just a pastime; she played informal games with her brothers and other boys in the neighbourhood.

Dottin also attended St James Secondary School (now Frederick Smith Secondary School), at Trents in the parish of St James.

Between 2005 and 2007, Dottin competed successfully in the youth level (U-17), and in 2008 she medalled in the junior level (U-20), of the CARIFTA Games, an annual athletics competition founded by the Caribbean Free Trade Association (CARIFTA). Her most outstanding CARIFTA was the 2007 event, at which she won a record-breaking three gold medals, in discus throw, javelin throw and shot put, respectively. However, in the aftermath of that event she came to feel disillusioned at what she felt was a lack of support from the Barbadian track and field governing body.

By then, Dottin had begun playing cricket formally, as a 14 year old. She had been spotted by another West Indies player, Pamela Lavine, while playing a recreational game. Although her mother had been resistant to her playing cricket, Dottin had wanted to try something else. The high level of fitness she had developed as a track and field athlete was an important factor in her rise through the cricketing ranks. Before long, the task of balancing the two sports became too difficult for Dottin, and she chose cricket, probably because she had "... started to grow a love for the game".

== Cricket career ==
=== International debut ===
Dottin made her international cricket debut in 2008, when she was selected as part of the West Indies squad to tour Europe. Playing in the opening WODI of the tour, Dottin bowled two overs without taking a wicket, allowing eleven runs to be scored. In the West Indies reply, she top-scored with an unbeaten 33 as her team chased the total down in under 20 overs. She scored her first half-century in international cricket in her fourth ODI, making 66 having opened the batting against Netherlands. She completed the tour of Europe with 149 ODI runs at a batting average of 29.80, second among the West Indians in both areas, trailing Stafanie Taylor. She continued to open the innings during the tour of Sri Lanka, averaging 18.20, but struggled from the same position in the first two matches of the 2009 Women's Cricket World Cup, and after failing to make double figures in either match, was dropped down the batting order to number five. The move immediately paid off as she scored 51 in the next match, against hosts Australia and then 23 against both Pakistan and England in the following matches, though she finished the tournament with low-scores against India and Pakistan.

=== 2010 World Twenty20 ===
In the opening match of the 2010 ICC Women's World Twenty20, Dottin scored the first Women's Twenty20 International century, scoring 112 not out against South Africa at Warner Park, St. Kitts. Coming into bat at number six in the tenth over, Dottin made her first 50 runs in 25 balls, and then moved from 50 to 100 in a further 13 balls. In total, she hit seven 4s and nine 6s in the innings, propelling the West Indies to a match-winning total. In addition to being the first century in women's Twenty20 Internationals, her 38-ball century is the fastest by any female batter in a Twenty20 International. The fastest century scored for a male batsman is by Chris Gayle, who scored his century in just 30 deliveries in IPL 2013 against Pune Warriors India.

=== 2018 World Twenty20 ===
In October 2018, she was named in the West Indies' squad for the 2018 ICC Women's World Twenty20 tournament in the West Indies. In the West Indies' opening match of the tournament, against Bangladesh, Dottin took five wickets for five runs to take her first five-wicket haul in WT20Is. The West Indies went on to win the game by 60 runs, with Dottin named as the player of the match. She was the leading run-scorer and wicket-taker for the West Indies in the tournament, with 121 runs and ten wickets in five matches. Following the conclusion of the tournament, she was named as the standout player in the team by the International Cricket Council (ICC).

=== 2020 World Twenty20 and beyond ===
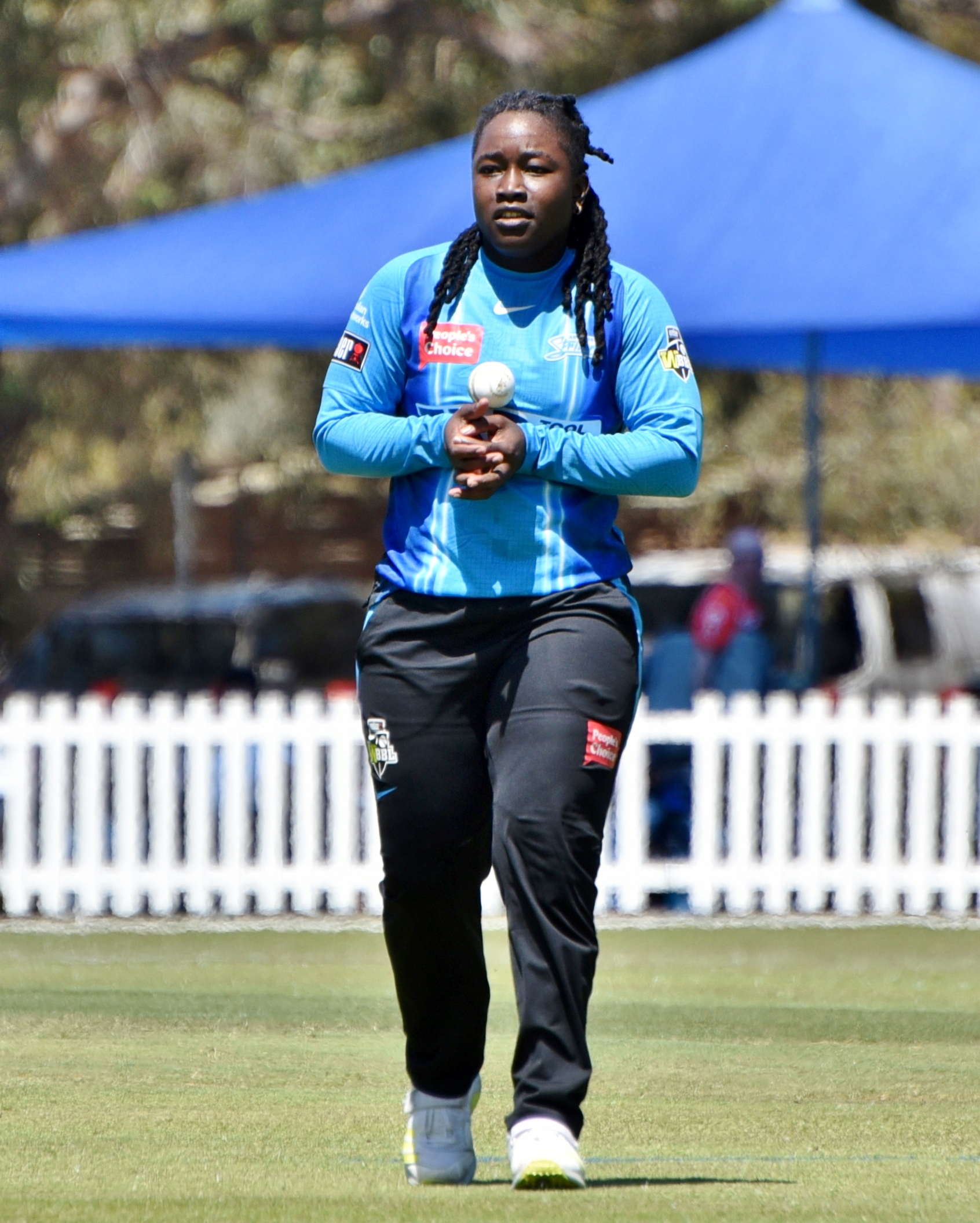
Dottin playing for Adelaide Strikers in November 2022

In January 2020, she was named in West Indies' squad for the 2020 ICC Women's T20 World Cup in Australia. She came back into the team after a long period on the sidelines with a shoulder injury. During the tournament, she had a horror run, and the team was eliminated in the group stage. In November 2020, Dottin was nominated for the ICC Women's T20I Cricketer of the Decade award. In September 2021, in the third match against South Africa, Dottin scored her 3,000th run in WODI cricket.

In October 2021, she was named in the West Indies team for the 2021 Women's Cricket World Cup Qualifier tournament in Zimbabwe. In February 2022, she was named in the West Indies team for the 2022 Women's Cricket World Cup in New Zealand. In the team's first match of the tournament, against New Zealand, she bowled a match-winning final over at her own insistence; in its second match, against England, she took an outstanding catch at backward point to help the team to a seven run victory. She also made her mark on every other match of the group stage.

In April 2022, she was bought by the Manchester Originals for the 2022 season of The Hundred in England. She was later signed by North West Thunder for the 2022 Rachael Heyhoe Flint Trophy. In April 2023, it was announced that Dottin was re-joining North West Thunder, this time for the entire season. However, she missed the end of Thunder's season in order to play in the 2023 Women's Caribbean Premier League.

In May 2022, Dottin was recruited to play in the privately run 2022 FairBreak Invitational T20 in Dubai, United Arab Emirates. She was allocated to the Barmy Army team. In July 2022, she was named in the Barbados team for the cricket tournament at the 2022 Commonwealth Games in Birmingham, England.

Dottin retired from international cricket on August 1, 2022, citing a West Indies team environment "non-conducive to my ability to thrive." She reversed her decision on July 27, 2024, saying she was "eager to return to the game that I love and contribute my utmost to the West Indies women’s team across all formats." Subsequently, Dottin was named in the West Indies squad for the 2024 ICC Women's T20 World Cup.

== International centuries ==
One Day International centuries
Runs	Match	Opponents	City	Venue	Year
104*	104	Pakistan	Leicester, England	Grace Road	2017
132	128	Pakistan	Karachi, Pakistan	National Stadium	2021
150*	132	South Africa	Johannesburg, South Africa	Wanderers Stadium	2022

- Source: CricInfo

T20 International centuries
Runs	Match	Opponents	City	Venue	Year
112*	16	South Africa	Basseterre, Saint Kitts and Nevis	Warner Park Sporting Complex	2010
112	94	Sri Lanka	Saint George, Antigua and Barbuda	Coolidge Cricket Ground	2017

- Source: CricInfo

== Athletics career ==
Growing up, Dottin was also active and successful in track and field, winning medals for Barbados at international meetings. Starting at the age of 14 years, she competed in the youth level (U-17) of the CARIFTA Games winning one silver in 2005, one gold and one silver in 2006, and three gold medals in 2007.

=== Achievements in Athletics ===
Year	Competition	Venue	Position	Event	Notes
Representing Barbados
2005	CARIFTA Games (U-17)	Bacolet, Trinidad and Tobago	6th	Shot put	11.06m
2005	CARIFTA Games (U-17)	Bacolet, Trinidad and Tobago	2nd	Javelin throw	37.21m
2006	CARIFTA Games (U-17)	Les Abymes, Guadeloupe	2nd	Shot put	11.48m
2006	CARIFTA Games (U-17)	Les Abymes, Guadeloupe	1st	Javelin throw	37.19m
2006	Central American and Caribbean Junior Championships (U-17)	Port of Spain, Trinidad and Tobago	1st	Shot put	11.95m
2006	Central American and Caribbean Junior Championships (U-17)	Port of Spain, Trinidad and Tobago	1st	Javelin throw	39.92m CR
2007	CARIFTA Games (U-17)	Providenciales, Turks and Caicos Islands	1st	Shot put	12.26m
2007	CARIFTA Games (U-17)	Providenciales, Turks and Caicos Islands	1st	Discus throw	39.58m
2007	CARIFTA Games (U-17)	Providenciales, Turks and Caicos Islands	1st	Javelin throw	42.90m
2008	CARIFTA Games (U-20)	Basseterre, Saint Kitts and Nevis	4th	Shot put	12.65m
2008	CARIFTA Games (U-20)	Basseterre, Saint Kitts and Nevis	5th	Discus throw	32.19m
2008	CARIFTA Games (U-20)	Basseterre, Saint Kitts and Nevis	1st	Javelin throw	47.00m

== Personal life ==
Dottin's self-proclaimed nickname is "World Boss", a moniker also used by Chris Gayle until he moved on to "Universe Boss". During the 2022 FairBreak Invitational T20 tournament, she wore a shirt with "World Boss" on the back instead of her surname.
