= Nivea Smith =

Bahamian sprinter

Medal record

Women's Athletics

Representing Bahamas

World Youth Championships
Bronze medal – third place	2007 Ostrava	200 m

CAC Championships
Gold medal – first place	2011 Mayagüez	200 m
Bronze medal – third place	2011 Mayagüez	4×100 m relay
Bronze medal – third place	2013 Morelia	4×100 m relay

CAC Junior Championships (U17)
Bronze medal – third place	2006 Port of Spain	200 m
Bronze medal – third place	2006 Port of Spain	4x100 m relay

CARIFTA Games Junior (U20)
Gold medal – first place	2007 Providenciales	200 m
Gold medal – first place	2007 Providenciales	4x100 m relay
Gold medal – first place	2008 Basseterre	200 m
Gold medal – first place	2008 Basseterre	4x100 m relay
Silver medal – second place	2009 Vieux Fort	200 m
Silver medal – second place	2009 Vieux Fort	4x100 m relay

CARIFTA Games Youth (U17)
Gold medal – first place	2006 Les Abymes	200 m
Silver medal – second place	2006 Les Abymes	4x100 m relay
Silver medal – second place	2006 Les Abymes	4x400 m relay
Bronze medal – third place	2006 Les Abymes	100 m

Nivea Smith (born 18 February 1990) is a sprinter who specializes in the 200 metres. She grew up in Freeport where she attended Mary Star of the Sea Primary School, and later graduated from Grand Bahama Catholic High School. She later went on to compete for Auburn University where she was coached by Henry Rolle. She became the first Bahamian to ever medal at the IAAF World Youth Championships when she earned a bronze in the 200m in 2007 with a time of 23.69.

== Personal bests ==
Event	Time	Venue	Date
100 m	11.52	Athens, Georgia	14 MAY 2011
200 m	22.71	Nassau, Bahamas	26 JUN 2010
60m	7.51 (indoor)	Blacksburg, Virginia	03 FEB 2012
200m	23.12 (indoor)	Fayetteville, Arkansas	12 MAR 2010

== Achievements ==
Year	Competition	Venue	Position	Event	Notes
Representing Bahamas
2005	CARIFTA Games (U-17)	Bacolet, Trinidad and Tobago	5th	100 m	11.94 (1.5 m/s)
2005	CARIFTA Games (U-17)	Bacolet, Trinidad and Tobago	4th	200 m	24.16 (-1.0 m/s)
2006	CARIFTA Games (U-17)	Les Abymes, Guadeloupe	3rd	100 m	11.90 (1.0 m/s)
2006	CARIFTA Games (U-17)	Les Abymes, Guadeloupe	1st	200 m	23.66 (-0.6 m/s)
2006	CARIFTA Games (U-17)	Les Abymes, Guadeloupe	2nd	4 × 100 m relay	46.17
2006	CARIFTA Games (U-17)	Les Abymes, Guadeloupe	2nd	4 × 400 m relay	3:49.14
2006	Central American and Caribbean Junior Championships (U-17)	Port of Spain, Trinidad and Tobago	4th	100 m	12.02 (0.7 m/s)
2006	Central American and Caribbean Junior Championships (U-17)	Port of Spain, Trinidad and Tobago	3rd	200 m	24.23 w (3.2 m/s)
2006	Central American and Caribbean Junior Championships (U-17)	Port of Spain, Trinidad and Tobago	3rd	4 × 100 m relay	46.31
2006	World Junior Championships	Beijing, China	11th (h)	4 × 100 m relay	45.41
2007	CARIFTA Games (U-20)	Providenciales, Turks and Caicos Islands	1st	200 m	23.45 (1.3 m/s)
2007	CARIFTA Games (U-20)	Providenciales, Turks and Caicos Islands	10th	Long jump	4.91m (-0.2 m/s)
2007	CARIFTA Games (U-20)	Providenciales, Turks and Caicos Islands	1st	4 × 100 m relay	44.94
2007	World Youth Championships	Ostrava, Czech Republic	3rd	200 m	23.69 (-1.9 m/s)
2007	World Youth Championships	Ostrava, Czech Republic	5th (h)	Medley relay (100m x 200m x 300m x 400m)	2:13.04
2008	CARIFTA Games (U-20)	Basseterre, Saint Kitts and Nevis	1st	200 m	23.01 (1.4 m/s)
2008	CARIFTA Games (U-20)	Basseterre, Saint Kitts and Nevis	1st	4 × 100 m relay	44.36 CR
2008	CARIFTA Games (U-20)	Basseterre, Saint Kitts and Nevis	4th	4 × 400 m relay	3:47.47
2008	World Junior Championships	Bydgoszcz, Poland	11th (sf)	200 m	23.84 (-1.1 m/s)
2008	World Junior Championships	Bydgoszcz, Poland	4th	4 × 100 m relay	44.61
2009	CARIFTA Games (U-20)	Vieux Fort, Saint Lucia	2nd	200 m	23.36 (1.5 m/s)
2009	CARIFTA Games (U-20)	Vieux Fort, Saint Lucia	2nd	4 × 100 m relay	45.43
