= Yohan Blake =

Jamaican sprinter (born 1989)

Yohan Blake CD
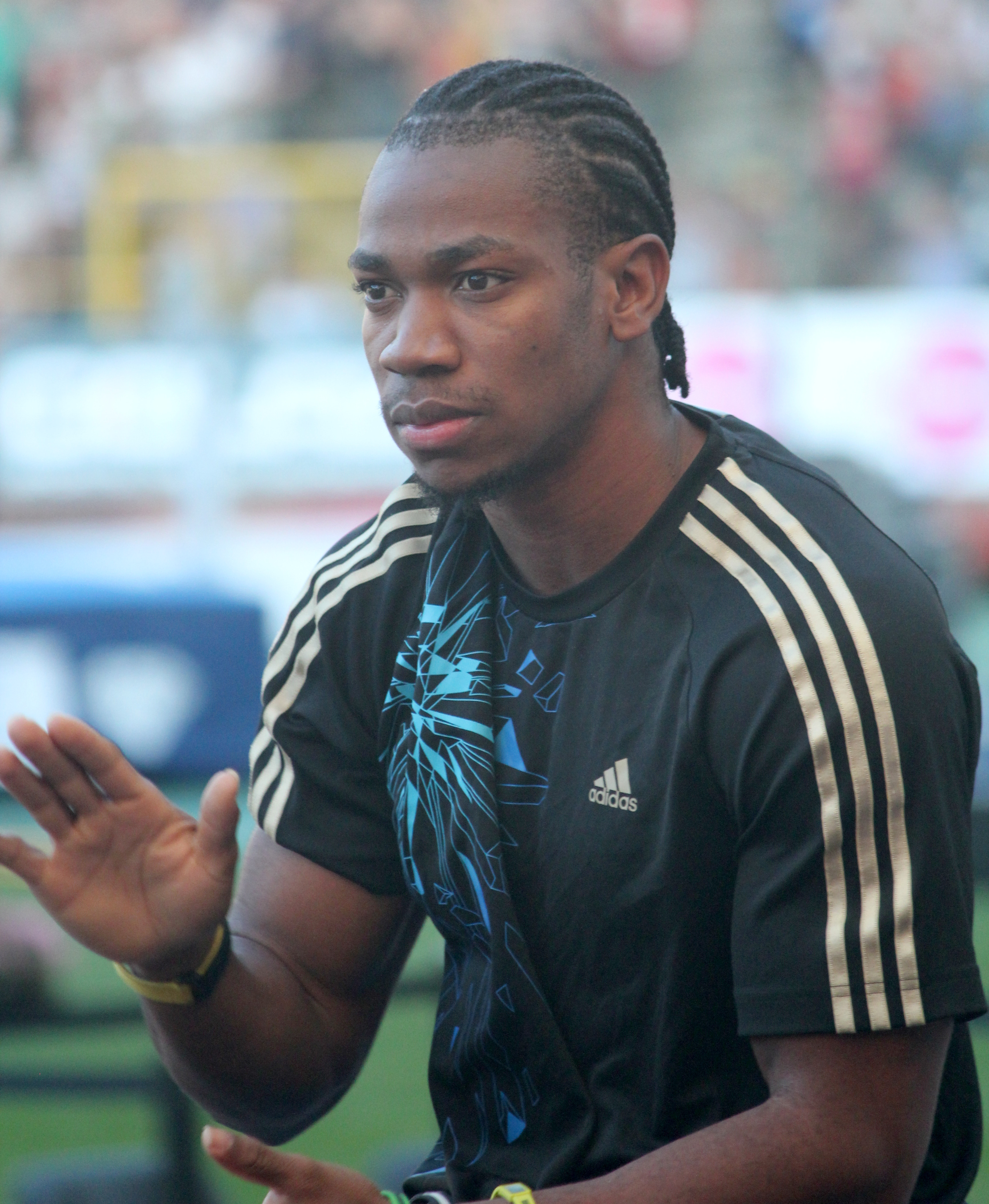
- Blake at the Memorial Van Damme 2012

Personal information
- Nationality: Jamaica
- Born: 26 December 1989 (age 36) St. James, Jamaica
- Height: 1.80 m (5 ft 11 in)
- Weight: 80 kg (176 lb)

Sport
- Sport: Track and field
- Events: 100 m, 200 m
- Club: Dynamic Speed; Titans; Racers Track Club (2009–2020)
- Coached by: Michael Frater (2023-2026); Gregory Little (2020-2023); Patrick Dawson (2019); Glen Mills (2009–2019)
- Retired: April 2026

Achievements and titles
- Personal bests: 60 m: 6.45 (Kingston 2023); 100 m: 9.69 (Lausanne 2012) 2nd all time; 200 m: 19.26 (Brussels 2011) 2nd all time; 400 m: 46.32 (Kingston 2013)
Medal record
Representing Jamaica
Men's athletics
Event	1st	2nd	3rd
Olympic Games	2	2	0
World Championships	2	0	0
World Relays	2	0	1
Commonwealth Games	0	0	2
World Junior Championships	1	1	1
Pan American Junior Championships	0	1	1
CAC Junior Championships	3	0	0
CARIFTA Games (Junior)	5	0	0
CARIFTA Games (Youth)	2	0	0
Total	17	4	5
Olympic Games
Gold medal – first place	2012 London	4 × 100 m relay
Gold medal – first place	2016 Rio de Janeiro	4 × 100 m relay
Silver medal – second place	2012 London	100 m
Silver medal – second place	2012 London	200 m
World Championships
Gold medal – first place	2011 Daegu	100 m
Gold medal – first place	2011 Daegu	4 × 100 m relay
Commonwealth Games
Bronze medal – third place	2018 Gold Coast	100 m
Bronze medal – third place	2018 Gold Coast	4 × 100 m relay
World Relays
Gold medal – first place	2014 Bahamas	4 × 100 m
Gold medal – first place	2014 Bahamas	4 × 200 m
Bronze medal – third place	2017 Bahamas	4 × 200 m
Diamond League
Second place	2022 Zurich	100 m
Third place	2019 Zurich	100 m
World Junior Championships
Gold medal – first place	2006 Beijing	4 × 100 m relay
Silver medal – second place	2008 Bydgoszcz	4 × 100 m relay
Bronze medal – third place	2006 Beijing	100 m
Pan American Junior Championships
Silver medal – second place	2007 São Paulo	100 m
Bronze medal – third place	2007 São Paulo	4 × 400 m relay
CAC Junior Championships (U20)
Gold medal – first place	2006 Port of Spain	100 m
Gold medal – first place	2006 Port of Spain	200 m
Gold medal – first place	2006 Port of Spain	4 × 100 m relay
CARIFTA Games (Junior)
Gold medal – first place	2006 Les Abymes	200 m
Gold medal – first place	2006 Les Abymes	4 × 100 m relay
Gold medal – first place	2007 Providenciales	100 m
Gold medal – first place	2007 Providenciales	4 × 100 m relay
Gold medal – first place	2008 Basseterre	100 m
CARIFTA Games (Youth)
Gold medal – first place	2005 Bacolet	100 m
Gold medal – first place	2005 Bacolet	200 m
Representing Americas
Continental Cup
Gold medal – first place	2018 Ostrava	4 × 100 m

Yohan Blake (born 26 December 1989) is a retired Jamaican sprinter specialising in the 100-metre and 200-metre sprint races. He won gold at the 100 m at the 2011 World Athletics Championships as the youngest 100 m world champion ever, and a silver medal in the 2012 Olympic Games in London in the 100 m and 200 m races for the Jamaican team behind Usain Bolt. His times of 9.75 in 100 m and 19.44 in 200 m are the fastest 100 m and 200 m Olympic sprints in history to place second.

Blake is the second‑fastest man ever in both 100 m and 200 m. Together with Tyson Gay, he is the joint second fastest man ever over 100 m with a personal best of 9.69 seconds which he ran on 23 August 2012 which he ran into a slight headwind of −0.1 m/s compared to Tyson Gay's +2.0 m/s making his time (with wind adjustments) the second fastest time of all time. Only Usain Bolt has run faster (9.58 s and 9.63 s). His personal best for the 200 m (19.26 seconds) is the second fastest time ever after Bolt (19.19 seconds). Blake holds the Jamaican national junior record for the 100 metres, and was the youngest sprinter to have broken the 10-second barrier at 19 years, 196 days old before Trayvon Bromell ran 100 m in 9.97 seconds at 18 years 11 months and 3 days old. As such, Blake is considered one of the best sprinters of all time.

Blake was coached by Glen Mills until 2019. His training partners were Usain Bolt and Daniel Bailey.

== Early life ==
Yohan Blake was born on 26 December 1989. He attended Green Park Primary and Junior High School in the Parish of Clarendon. He was discovered as a young talent from Davis Primary School by coach Carlton Solan. While he was at Green Park. Blake attended St. Jago High School in Spanish Town where his first sporting love was cricket. Blake was a fast bowler, and it was only after the school Principal saw how quickly he ran to the wicket that he was urged to try sprinting.

== Career ==
=== Junior ===
Blake set the fastest time by a Jamaican junior sprinter over 100 m with 10.11 seconds. The record was set at the 2007 CARIFTA Games held in the Turks and Caicos Islands where he was also a member of the winning 4 × 100 m relay team. At this occasion, he was awarded the Austin Sealy Trophy for the most outstanding athlete of the 2007 CARIFTA Games.

In 2008 when Usain Bolt was asked in an interview whether there were any sprinters that could challenge him, Bolt named his training partner Blake, saying "Watch out for Yohan Blake. He works like a beast. He's there with me step for step in training." The "Beast" nickname stuck.

Blake won the 100 metre "B" race at the 2009 Reebok Grand Prix. His exploits at the Golden Gala in July represented a significant improvement. He proved himself to be a serious competitor at the senior level: he took third place behind Tyson Gay and Asafa Powell and improved his personal best with a 10-second barrier-breaking run of 9.96 seconds, becoming the youngest athlete ever to do so. He improved to 9.93 seconds shortly after, taking third place behind training partners Bolt and Daniel Bailey at the Meeting Areva.

=== Drug ban ===
Prior to the 2009 World Championships, Blake (along with Marvin Anderson and Sheri-Ann Brooks) tested positive for the stimulant 4-methyl-2-hexanamine. A disciplinary panel organised by the Jamaica Anti-Doping Commission (JADCO) cleared him of a doping infraction on the grounds that the drug was not on the World Anti-Doping Agency's banned list. However, JADCO appealed their own panel's ruling, stating that the athlete should be disciplined as the drug was similar in structure to the banned substance tuaminoheptane. As the panel would resolve the issue after the World Championships, the Jamaica Amateur Athletic Association took the precaution of withdrawing Blake from the relay race. The appeals tribunal decided that a ban would be appropriate, and Blake and the three other sprinters each received a three-month ban from competition.

=== 2011 ===
At the 2011 World Championships, Blake comfortably made the final. Following the disqualification of compatriot Usain Bolt, Blake won the gold medal in a time of 9.92 seconds. At 21 years, 245 days, Blake also became the youngest 100 metres world champion ever, surpassing Carl Lewis, who won the event at the 1983 World Championships at the age of 22 years, 38 days. At these World Championships, alongside Bolt, Nesta Carter and Michael Frater, Blake won gold in the 4 × 100 m relay final and broke the world record (set by the Jamaican team at the Beijing Olympics in 2008) with a time of 37.04 seconds.

At the 2011 IAAF Diamond League meeting in Zurich, Blake beat Asafa Powell in the 100 m with a personal best of 9.82 seconds. The following week in Brussels, Blake set a 2011 world leading time in the 200 m with a personal best of 19.26 seconds, the second fastest time in history. He improved more than half of a second (0.52 s) from his previous best of 19.78 s set in Monaco in 2010. In this particular race, his reaction time was relatively slow (0.269 s) and had he made even an average start, he could have comfortably set a new world record.

=== 2012 ===
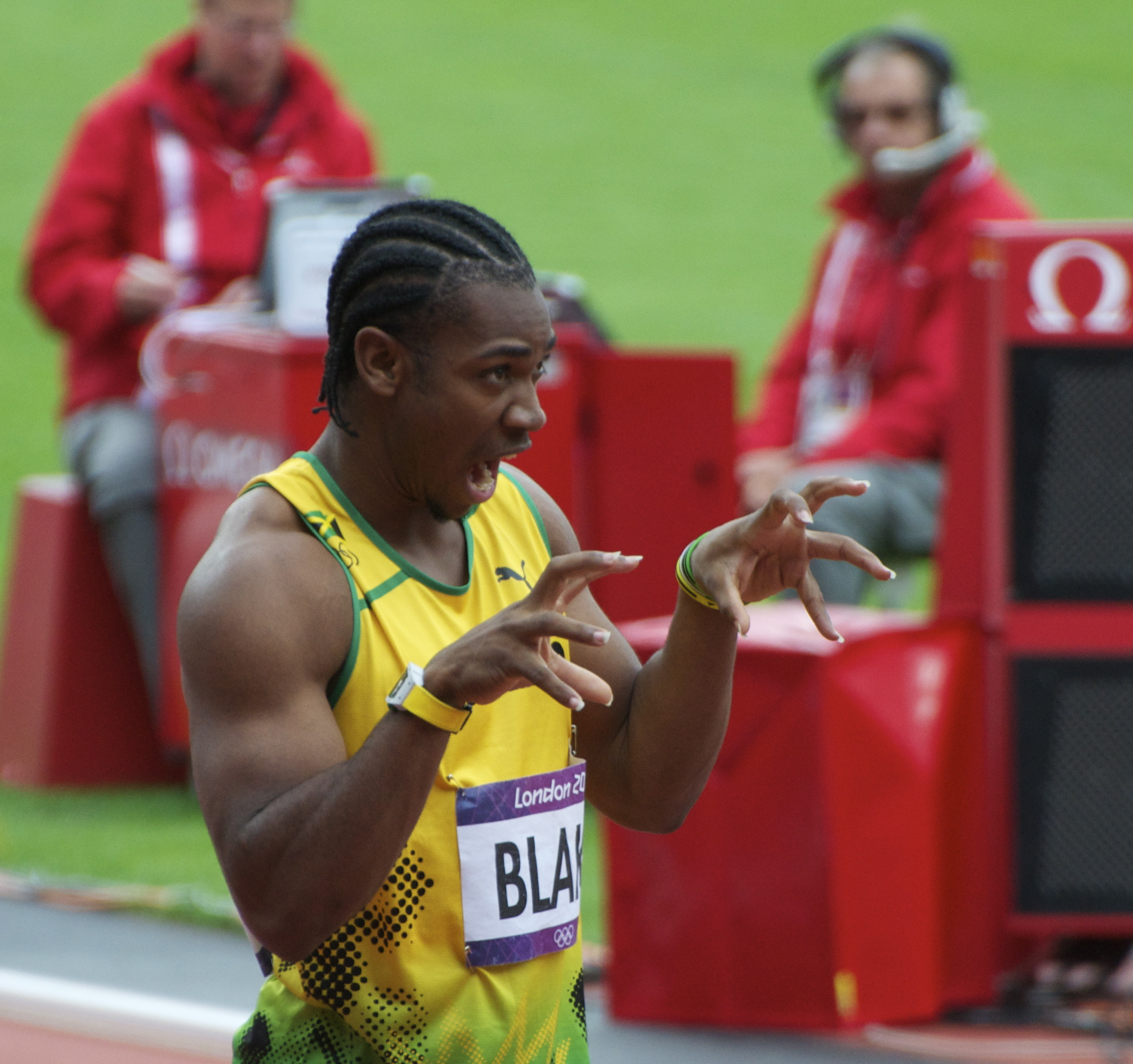
Blake doing his signature "Beast" move at the 2012 Olympics

Blake began his 2012 season strongly, registering the first sub-10-second time of the season (9.90 s) at April's UTech Classic. He went on to register a 9.84 second run at the Cayman Invitational prior to the Jamaican Olympic trials, where he beat Usain Bolt over 100 metres with a time of 9.75 seconds. He also won the 200 metres with a time of 19.80 s ahead of Bolt at 19.83 s.

The 2012 London Olympics was the first Olympics that Blake participated in. He came in as a serious threat to Bolt's 100 m title. In the 100 m final he placed second to Bolt in a time of 9.75 seconds. He also followed Bolt home in the final of the 200 metres where he won the silver medal in a time of 19.44 seconds, the fastest non-winning time in history.

In the 4 × 100 m final, Blake ran the third leg as the Jamaicans won gold, setting a new world record time of 36.84 seconds.

On 23 August 2012, at the Athletissima Diamond League meet in Lausanne, Switzerland, Blake ran the 100 metres in 9.69 seconds, tying him with Tyson Gay as the second fastest man in history, behind Bolt.

=== 2013 ===
Blake suffered a hamstring injury in April 2013. After running 20.72 seconds over 200 m in the Jamaica Nationals on 8 June, thus failing to qualify for the 200 m event at the 2013 Moscow World Championships, Blake pulled out of the 100 m event of the World Championships, for which he had an automatic entry as the defending world champion.

=== 2014 ===
Blake tried competing again in 2014, but placed 6th at the 200 m Lausanne Diamond League event, with a time of 20.48 seconds. He then suffered another hamstring injury and fell at the 40 metre mark during the Glasgow Diamond League 100 m race shortly after that, ending his season. Prior to the end of his season however, Blake anchored Jamaica in the 4 × 200 m relay at the first edition of the I.A.A.F. World Relays in Bahamas to gold which was also broke the previous world record of 1:18.68.

=== 2015 ===
Blake decided he was ready to race again in 2015 after recovering from injuries in 2013 and 2014. He failed to advance from the Jamaica Outdoor national championship semi-final in the 100 metres, placing ninth with a time of 10.36 seconds, with the top 8 advancing to the finals. He did not participate in the 200 m trials after that.

=== 2016 ===
Blake made a strong comeback in 2016, running his first sub-10 race since 2012—a 9.95 s in the 100 m at the 2016 Kingston MVP Track and Field meet. He then went on to defend both his 100 m and 200 m national titles in 9.92 seconds and 20.29 seconds respectively, in the absence of an injured Usain Bolt.

At the 2016 Summer Olympics, Blake progressed into the 100 m final, where he finished fourth in a season's best 9.93 seconds. In the 200 m, he finished 6th in his semi-final, failing to advance forward. However, Blake won his second career Olympic gold running the second leg in the 4 × 100 m relay.

=== 2017 ===
2017 proved to be a slight repeat of 2016 for Blake. Despite his teammates dropping the baton in the 4 × 100 metres at the 2017 IAAF World Relays, he was able to anchor his team to a bronze medal in the 4 × 200 metres. Later on in the season, he continued to post 100 m times superior to his 2016 season. At the Jamaican National Championships, he once again completed a double by clocking 9.90 s in the 100 m, and 19.97 s in the 200 m. His 9.90 s was the second fastest time that season, and his 200 m was not only his first sub-20 since 2012 and massive improvement from his previous season, but also tied for the sixth fastest time of the year. After the championships, Blake shaved his signature braids.

At the 2017 World Championships in Athletics in London, Blake finished in fourth place yet again in the 100 m final. This time, he clocked 9.99 seconds, just 0.04 behind Usain Bolt, who failed to win his last individual race and instead settled for bronze. Blake was one of the only four men who went under ten seconds during the race, the others being Bolt, silver medalist Christian Coleman, and gold medalist Justin Gatlin. Just as he did in Rio the previous year, Blake failed to progress into the 200 m final, though he was ranked closer this time with 11th overall and a slower 20.52 s to come third in his heat. After this, Blake looked forward to the Men's 4 × 100 metres relay, his last chance at a medal at the championships, and Usain Bolt's final race. During the race, Bolt pulled up 50 metres from the finish line in what was later confirmed to be another hamstring injury. Blake helped the injured Bolt, who refused a wheelchair, to his feet. Blake left the championships with no medals.

=== 2018 ===
Blake started his 2018 season early, in preparation for the 2018 Commonwealth Games. Despite a seasonal best of 10.05 s in the 100 m, he was still considered as the event's favorite. Blake qualified comfortably for the 100 m final with the fastest time in both the heats and the semis. However, he stumbled out of the blocks in the final, and despite his strong efforts to recover, he ultimately placed third in 10.19 seconds, behind Henricho Bruintjies and Akani Simbine of South Africa. Blake won another bronze in the Men's 4 × 100 m relay. After the Games, Blake focused on the Jamaican National Championships, hoping to win his third straight national title. However, he false started in the semi-finals, disqualifying his chances. He also opted out of the 200 m. Later on in the season, Blake continued to progress in the 100 m with two sub-tens.

=== 2019 ===
In January 2019, coach Glen Mills reported that he had parted ways with Blake after a disagreement. Blake switched to Patrick Dawson, and would continue to workout at the Racers Track Club site. Months later, Blake and numerous former members of Racers Track Club accused Mills of favoring Usain Bolt. Despite the controversy, Blake took home the national 100 m title for the 4th time, and finished 2nd in the 200 m. He also won the Birmingham Diamond League 100 m en route to the 2019 World Championships in Doha. There, he managed to place 5th in the 100 m final with a time of 9.97, but was unable to make it past the 200 m semi final, placing 6th with a time of 20.37.

Following his disappointing performance at the World Championships, Blake switched coaches once again to Gregory Little.

=== 2021 ===
Yohan Blake started his season at National Stadium, Kingston. On 13 March 2021, Blake ran 100 m in 10.29 seconds (0.0 m/s) there. On 24 April, he smashed his season best at 10.27 (+0.2 m/s).

On 2 May, Blake reached sub-ten performance clocking 9.98 seconds at the National Training Centre, Clermont, USA. But with the wind value being 2.7 m/s, the time became illegal.

Again on 5 June, his run of 9.97 seconds was turned down due to 2.1 m/s wind in Florida, USA.

Then, Blake ran an impressive 9.95 (+0.1 m/s) at the American Track League on 9 July 2021.

==== Tokyo Olympics ====
Blake had a disappointing Summer Olympics. He failed to advance to the final of the 100 m, placing sixth in his semifinal heat with a time of 10.14. He stated his leg had been bothering him. No Jamaican man qualified for the Olympic final, something that had not happened since the 2000 Summer Olympics. He and his Jamaican teammates came in fifth in the 4 × 100 m relay. He did not compete in the 200 m.

== Statistics ==
=== Personal bests ===
Event	Time (seconds)	Venue	Date	Ref.
60 metres	6.45 (+0.9 m/s)	Kingston	23 February 2023	
100 metres	9.69 (−0.1 m/s)	Lausanne	23 August 2012	#2 all time
200 metres	19.26 (+0.7 m/s)	Brussels	16 September 2011	#2 all time
400 metres	46.32	Kingston	23 March 2013	

- All information taken from IAAF profile

=== Season's Bests ===
Year	100 Metres	Year rank	200 Metres	Year rank
2005	10.56	—	—	—
2006	10.33	158	20.92	217
2007	10.11	31	20.62	81
2008	10.27	127	21.06	341
2009	10.07	34	20.60	83
2010	9.89	7	19.78	4
2011	9.82	5	**19.26**	1
2012	**9.69**	2	19.44	2
2013	—	—	20.72	152
2014	10.02	21	20.48	84
2015	10.12	71	21.57	1651
2016	9.93	10	20.13	23
2017	9.90	2	19.97	6
2018	9.94	11	—	—
2019	9.96	10	20.23	32
2020	10.15	36	20.62	45
2021	9.95	15	20.18	28
2022	9.85	3	20.20	42
2023	10.01	41	20.35	66
2024	10.16	178	—	—

- Year rank indicates the time's rank out of all times set that year.
- **Bold** indicates a lifetime personal best.

=== International Competitions ===
Year	Competition	Venue	Position	Event	Notes
Representing Jamaica
2005	CARIFTA Games (U-17)	Bacolet, Trinidad and Tobago	1st	100 m	11.01
2005	CARIFTA Games (U-17)	Bacolet, Trinidad and Tobago	1st	200 m	22.19
2005	World Youth Championships	Marrakesh, Morocco	7th	100 m	10.65 (+0.8 m/s)
2005	World Youth Championships	Marrakesh, Morocco	3rd (h)	Sprint medley relay	1:54.47
2006	CARIFTA Games (U-20)	Les Abymes, Guadeloupe	1st	200 m	21.12 (−0.5 m/s)
2006	CARIFTA Games (U-20)	Les Abymes, Guadeloupe	1st	4 × 100 m relay	39.81
2006	Central American and Caribbean; Junior Championships (U-20)	Port of Spain, Trinidad and Tobago	1st	100 m	10.33 (+1.5 m/s)
2006	Central American and Caribbean; Junior Championships (U-20)	Port of Spain, Trinidad and Tobago	1st	200 m	21.02 (+1.4 m/s)
2006	Central American and Caribbean; Junior Championships (U-20)	Port of Spain, Trinidad and Tobago	1st	4 × 100 m relay	40.49
2006	World Junior Championships	Beijing, China	3rd	100 m	10.42 (−0.5 m/s)
2006	World Junior Championships	Beijing, China	1st	4 × 100 m relay	39.05
2007	CARIFTA Games (U-20)	Providenciales, Turks and Caicos	1st	100 m	10.11 **CR** (+1.2 m/s)
2007	CARIFTA Games (U-20)	Providenciales, Turks and Caicos	1st	4 × 100 m relay	39.47
2008	CARIFTA Games (U-20)	Basseterre, Saint Kitts and Nevis	1st	100 m	10.32 (+0.1 m/s)
2008	World Junior Championships	Bydgoszcz, Poland	4th	100 m	10.51 (−0.8 m/s)
2008	World Junior Championships	Bydgoszcz, Poland	2nd	4 × 100 m relay	39.25
2011	World Championships	Daegu, South Korea	1st	100 m	9.92
2011	World Championships	Daegu, South Korea	1st	4 × 100 m relay	37.04 **WR**
2012	Olympic Games	London, United Kingdom	2nd	100 m	9.75
2012	Olympic Games	London, United Kingdom	2nd	200 m	19.44
2012	Olympic Games	London, United Kingdom	1st	4 × 100 m relay	36.84 **WR**
2014	World Relay Championships	Nassau, Bahamas	1st	4 × 100 m relay	37.77
2014	World Relay Championships	Nassau, Bahamas	1st	4 × 200 m relay	1:18.63 **WR**
2016	Olympic Games	Rio de Janeiro, Brazil	4th	100 m	9.93
2016	Olympic Games	Rio de Janeiro, Brazil	16th (sf)	200 m	20.37
2016	Olympic Games	Rio de Janeiro, Brazil	1st	4 × 100 m relay	37.27
2017	World Relay Championships	Nassau, Bahamas	–	4 × 100 m relay	DNF
2017	World Relay Championships	Nassau, Bahamas	3rd	4 × 200 m relay	1:21.09
2017	World Championships	London, United Kingdom	4th	100 m	9.99
2017	World Championships	London, United Kingdom	11th (sf)	200 m	20.52
2017	World Championships	London, United Kingdom	—	4 × 100 m relay	DNF
2018	Commonwealth Games	Gold Coast, Australia	3rd	100 m	10.19
2018	Commonwealth Games	Gold Coast, Australia	3rd	4 × 100 m relay	38.35
2019	World Championships	Doha, Qatar	5th	100 m	9.97
2019	World Championships	Doha, Qatar	15th (sf)	200 m	20.37
2019	World Championships	Doha, Qatar	11th (h)	4 × 100 m relay	38.15
2021	Olympic Games	Tokyo, Japan	18th (sf)	100 m	10.14
2021	Olympic Games	Tokyo, Japan	5th	4 × 100 m relay	37.84
2022	World Championships	Eugene, United States	9th (sf)	100 m	10.12
2022	World Championships	Eugene, United States	19th (h)	200 m	20.35^{1}
2022	World Championships	Eugene, United States	4th	4 × 100 m relay	38.06

- National Junior Championships: 2006 (1st, 100 m & 200 m)

^{1}Did not start in the semi-finals.

== Other interests and personal life ==
Away from athletics, Blake continues to be a keen cricketer, having once held ambitions to play for the West Indies. Playing for the Kingston Cricket Club in the athletics off-season and specialising as a bowler, Blake once took four wickets for ten runs.

On 16 August 2012, Blake rang the bell at Lord's Cricket Ground, London to signify the start of the third Investec test match between England and South Africa. He was the first non-professional cricketer to do this.

Blake is also a fan of the IPL team Royal Challengers Bangalore (RCB) and has expressed his desire to play for them and for Yorkshire County Cricket Club. He has expressed his admiration of Virat Kohli's captaincy of the Indian cricket team.

In March 2021, Blake said that he would rather miss the upcoming Tokyo 2020 Olympics than take the COVID-19 vaccine.

Yohan is, as of April 2026, coaching at Dynamic Speed Track Club alongside Michael Frater.

Achievements
Preceded by (Jamaica) Usain Bolt	Men's season's best performance, 200 metres 2011	Succeeded by (Jamaica) Usain Bolt
