= Schillonie Calvert =

Jamaican sprinter (born 1988)

Schillonie Calvert-Powell
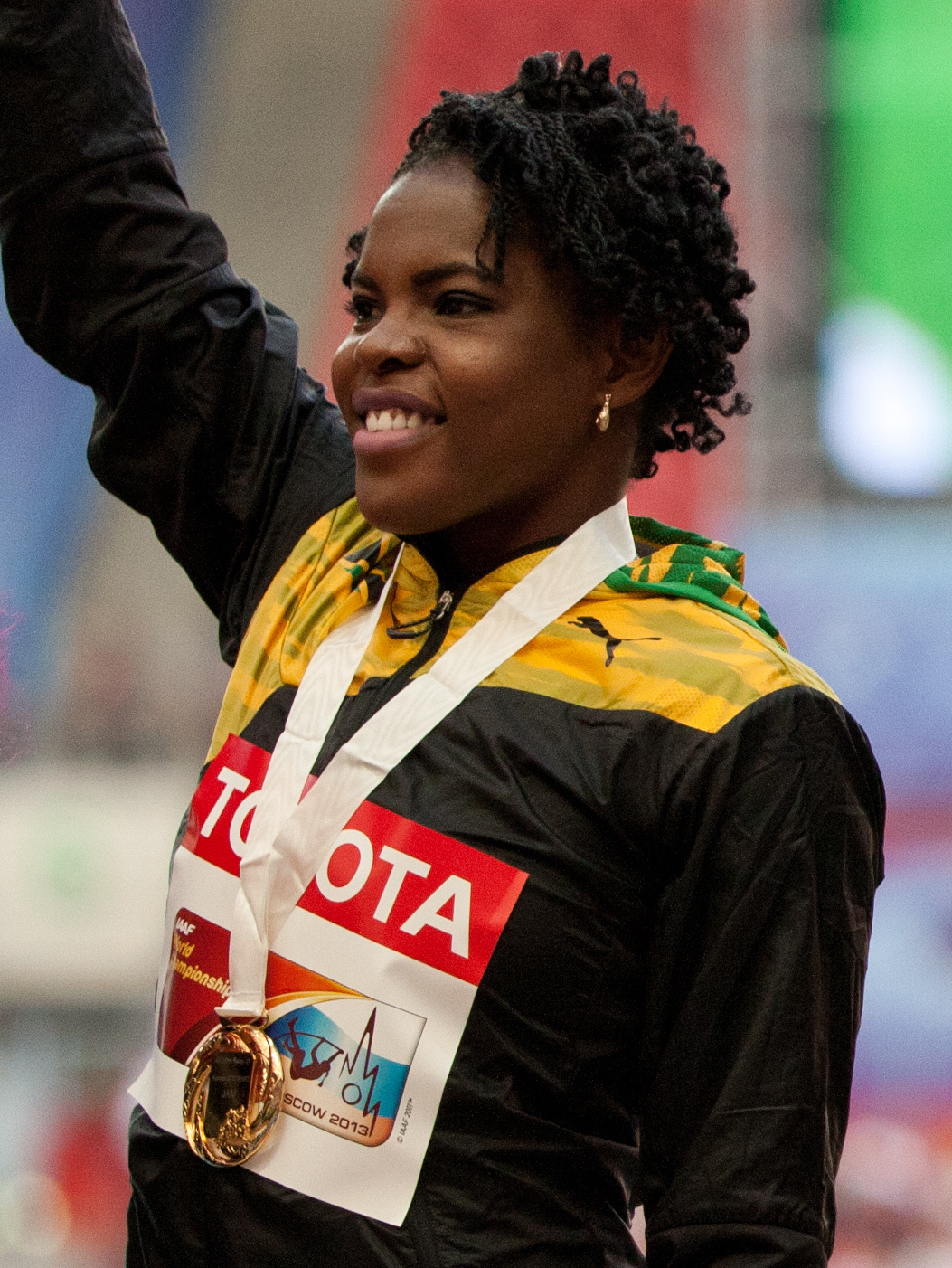

Personal information
- Born: 27 July 1988 (age 37) St. James, Jamaica
Medal record
Women's athletics
Representing Jamaica
Olympic Games
Silver medal – second place	2012 London	4 × 100 m relay
World Championships
Gold medal – first place	2013 Moscow	4 × 100 m relay
World Relay Championships
Silver medal – second place	2014 Nassau	4 × 100 m relay
World Youth Championships
Bronze medal – third place	2005 Marrakesh	100 m
Commonwealth Games
Gold medal – first place	2014 Glasgow	4 × 100 m relay
Pan American Games
Silver medal – second place	2015 Toronto	4 × 100 m relay
Pan American Junior Championships
Silver medal – second place	2005 Windsor	100 m
Silver medal – second place	2007 São Paulo	200 m
Bronze medal – third place	2007 São Paulo	100 m
Bronze medal – third place	2007 São Paulo	4 × 400 m relay
CAC Junior Championships (U20)
Gold medal – first place	2006 Port of Spain	100 m
Gold medal – first place	2006 Port of Spain	200 m
Gold medal – first place	2006 Port of Spain	4 × 100 m relay
CARIFTA Games Junior (U20)
Gold medal – first place	2006 Les Abymes	100 m
Gold medal – first place	2006 Les Abymes	4 × 100 m relay
Silver medal – second place	2007 Providenciales	100 m
Silver medal – second place	2007 Providenciales	4 × 100 m relay
CARIFTA Games Youth (U17)
Gold medal – first place	2004 Hamilton	100 m
Gold medal – first place	2004 Hamilton	200 m relay
Gold medal – first place	2004 Hamilton	4 × 100 m relay

Schillonie Calvert (born 27 July 1988) is a Jamaican sprinter who specializes in the 100 metres. She made the 4 × 100 relay team for Jamaica as a reserve for the 2011 World Championships in Athletics in Daegu and the 2012 Summer Olympics in London. She did not participate at the 2012 Worlds. She ran in the 4 × 100 m heat with the Jamaican team at the 2012 London Olympics which later went on to take silver in the finals. She competed as an individual in the 100 m at the 2013 World Championships, where she was also part of the Jamaican team that won gold in the 4 × 100 m. She competed in the 100 m, 200 m and 4 × 100 m at the 2014 Commonwealth Games, and was part of the 4 × 100 m team that set a new Games record.

== Personal bests ==
Event	Time	Venue	Date
100 m	10.94	Mesa, United States	10 June 2017
200 m	22.55	Zagreb, Croatia	13 September 2011
