= 2006 Central American and Caribbean Junior Championships =

XVII Central American and Caribbean Junior Championships
- Dates: 14–16 July
- Host city: Port of Spain, Trinidad (Trinidad and Tobago)
- Venue: Hasely Crawford Stadium
- Level: Junior and Youth
- Events: 81 (43 junior, 38 youth)
- Participation: about 449 (245 junior, 204 youth) athletes from 24 nations

The 17th Central American and Caribbean Junior Championships were held in the Hasely Crawford Stadium in Port of Spain, Trinidad, between 14 and 16 July 2006, and organized by the National Amateur Athletic Association of Trinidad & Tobago (NAAATT). The event was open for athletes from the invited countries, that are members of the Central American and Caribbean Athletic Confederation (CACAC), in two categories: Junior A Category: 17 to 19 years as of 31 December 2004 (Born between 1987 and 1989), and Junior B Category: 14 to 16 years as of 31 December 2006 (Born between 1990 and 1992). A preview and detailed discussions of the results on a day-by-day basis are given.

== Records ==
A total of 18 new championship records were set.

Event	Record	Athlete	Country	Type
Boys Under 20 (Junior)
5000 m	14:21.58	Diego Alberto Borrego	Mexico	CR
110 m hurdles	13.69 (1.6 m/s)	Ryan Brathwaite	Barbados	CR
Shot put	17.06m	Tyron Benjamin	Dominica	CR
Discus throw	52.79m	Sharif Small	Jamaica	CR
Hammer throw (junior implement, 6 kg)	60.25m^{1)}	Cristian Vargas	Puerto Rico	CR
Girls Under 20 (Junior)
200 m	23.20 (2.0 m/s)	Schillonie Calvert	Jamaica	CR
400 m	51.57	Sonita Sutherland	Jamaica	CR
400 m hurdles	57.09	Sherene Pinnock	Jamaica	CR
2000 m steeplechase	8:09.76	Adriana Rosado	Puerto Rico	CR
Pole vault	4.05m	Alexandra González	Puerto Rico	CR
Long jump	6.56m (0.0 m/s)	Rhonda Watkins	Trinidad and Tobago	CR
Hammer throw	54.51m	Aline Huerta	Mexico	CR
Boys Under 17 (Youth)
400 m hurdles	52.62	Nathan Arnette	Bahamas	CR
4 × 100 m relay	40.83	Jerome Myers; Ramone McKenzie; Nickel Ashmeade; Dexter Lee	Jamaica	CR
Pole vault	4.50m	David A. Díaz	Puerto Rico	CR
Discus throw	52.77m	Omar Bryan	Jamaica	CR
Girls Under 17 (Youth)
100 m hurdles	13.72 (1.3 m/s)	Kierre Beckles	Barbados	CR
Javelin throw	39.92m	Deandra Dottin	Barbados	CR
4000 m race walk	20:24.68	Jamy Franco	Guatemala	CR

Key

AR — Area record • CR — Championship record • NR — National record

Notes:

^{1)}: This was a new championship record using the (junior implement) hammer of 6 kg. However, Yosmel Montes from Cuba threw the hammer 65.88m using the (senior implement) 7.257 kg hammer during the 1996 championships.

== Medal summary ==
The results are published.

=== Male Junior A (under 20) ===
Event	Gold		Silver		Bronze	
100 metres (1.5 m/s)	Yohan Blake (JAM)	10.33	Keston Bledman (TRI)	10.39	Ramon Gittens (BAR)	10.56
200 metres (1.4 m/s)	Yohan Blake (JAM)	21.02	Ramon Gittens (BAR)	21.12	Kervin Morgan (TRI)	21.22
400 metres	Renny Quow (TRI)	46.14	Allodin Fothergill (JAM)	46.17	Edino Steele (JAM)	46.29
800 metres	Jamaal James (TRI)	1:51.73	Andre Thomas (JAM)	1:52.28	Melvin Weller (JAM); Osbaldo Chávez (MEX)	1:52.93; 1:52.93
1500 metres	Diego Alberto Borrego (MEX)	3:52.04	Josué Ramírez (MEX)	3:55.18	Adrián Rodríguez (PUR)	3:56.79
5000 metres	Diego Alberto Borrego (MEX)	14:21.58 CR	Juan Carlos Carera (MEX)	14:51.22	Adrián Rodríguez (PUR)	15:45.88
110 metres hurdles (1.6 m/s)	Ryan Brathwaite (BAR)	13.69 CR	Keiron Stewart (JAM)	14.04	Ronnie Griffith (BAR)	14.21
400 metres hurdles	Terry Marshall (BAR)	53.21	Keston Toney (TRI)	53.29	David López (PUR)	53.56
3000 metres steeplechase	Aarón Arias (MEX)	9:05.99	Omar Alejandro Chávez (MEX)	9:23.43	Douglas Omar Aguilar (ESA)	9:52.77
High jump	Jorge Rouco (MEX)	2.11m	Jamal Wilson (BAH)	2.11m	Therrold Murray (BAR)	2.08m
Pole vault	Edwin Barrientos (GUA)	4.10m	Yeisel Cintrón (PUR)	4.00m	Lorenzo Johnson (JAM)	4.00m
Long jump	Alain Bailey (JAM)	7.68m	Rudon Bastian (BAH)	7.55m	Nicholas Gordon (Long Jump) (JAM)	7.30m w (2.2 m/s)
Triple jump	Sean Powell (JAM)	15.25m (0.7 m/s)	Kessel Campbell (HON)	15.09m (0.9 m/s)	Lamar Delaney (BAH)	14.97m (0.6 m/s)
Shot put	Tyron Benjamin (DMA)	17.06m CR	Raymond Brown (JAM)	16.87m	Guilbert Villarreal (MEX)	15.36m
Discus throw	Sharif Small (JAM)	52.79m CR	Kellon Marshall (TRI)	51.74m	Tyron Benjamin (DMA)	51.55m
Hammer throw	Cristian Vargas (PUR)	60.25m CR	Wilfredo de Jesús (PUR)	58.77m	Luis Alfonso Torres (MEX)	56.99m
Javelin throw	Juan José Méndez (MEX)	62.09m	Jeffrey Williams (TRI)	57.86m	Omar Jones (IVB)	56.19m
Decathlon	Ramón Garibay (MEX)	6583	Darwin Colón (HON)	6178	Sean Pickstock (BAH)	5750
10,000m race walk	Gerardo de Jesús Chávez (MEX)	46:21.34	Fernando Armando Martínez (MEX)	46:21.39	Víctor Mendoza (ESA)	47:20.82
4×100 metres relay	Jamaica; Cawayne Jervis; Oshane Bailey; Tristan Taylor; Yohan Blake	40.49	Barbados; Andre Harper; Dario Alleyne; Jamal Marshall; Ramon Gittens	40.68	Cayman Islands; Kemar Hyman; Tyrell Cuffy; Maxwell Hyman; Rhymiech Adolphus	40.79
4×400 metres relay	Jamaica; Tarik Edwards; Allodin Fothergill; Gawain Gray; Edino Steele	3:06.99	Trinidad and Tobago; Jovon Toppin; Renny Quow; Ade Alleyne-Forte; Kervin Morgan	3:07.51	Bahamas; Jamaal Butler; Ramon Miller; Juan Lewis; Jameson Strachan	3:09.09

=== Female Junior A (under 20) ===
Event	Gold		Silver		Bronze	
100 metres (1.0 m/s)	Schillonie Calvert (JAM)	11.39	Sheniqua Ferguson (BAH)	11.67	Semoy Hackett (TRI)	11.71
200 metres (2.0 m/s)	Schillonie Calvert (JAM)	23.20 CR	Anastasia Le-Roy (JAM)	23.25	Semoy Hackett (TRI)	23.62
400 metres	Sonita Sutherland (JAM)	51.57 CR	Bobby-Gaye Wilkins (JAM)	53.19	Janeil Bellile (TRI)	56.15
800 metres	Jodian Richards (JAM)	2:12.23	Vanessa Boyd (JAM)	2:14.09	Magaly Montserrat Murillo (MEX)	2:16.63
1500 metres	Jodian Richards (JAM)	4:33.77	Pilar McShine (TRI)	4:34.44	Beverly Ramos (PUR)	4:34.46
3000 metres	Pilar McShine (TRI)	10:28.94	Neisha Morgan (JAM)	10:30.81	Johana Freeman (PUR)	11:59.07
5000 metres	Beverly Ramos (PUR)	17:50.96	Suheily Rivera (PUR)	19:42.07		
100 metres hurdles (-0.2 m/s)	Kettiany Clarke (JAM)	13.60	Kimberly Stanford (BAR)	14.08	Karla Guadalupe Dueñas (MEX)	14.38
400 metres hurdles	Sherene Pinnock (JAM)	57.09 CR	Janeil Bellille (TRI)	1:00.03	Andrea Reid (JAM)	1:00.50
2000 m steeplechase	Adriana Rosado (PUR)	8:09.76 CR	Johana Freeman (PUR)	8:37.47		
High jump	Rhonda Watkins (TRI)	1.83m	Latroya Darrell (BER)	1.73m	Paola Fuentes (MEX)	1.70m
Pole vault	Alexandra González (PUR)	4.05m CR	Carmelita Correa (MEX)	3.20m		
Long jump	Rhonda Watkins (TRI)	6.56m CR (0.0 m/s)	Bianca Stuart (BAH)	6.09m (0.0 m/s)	Shara Proctor (AIA)	6.08m (0.0 m/s)
Triple jump	Arantxa King (BER)	12.84m (0.0 m/s)	Kimberly Williams (JAM)	12.47m (0.0 m/s)	Latroya Darrell (BER)	12.29m (0.0 m/s)
Shot put	Annie Alexander (TRI)	14.91m	Tracy Morrison (BAH)	13.02m	Paulina Flores (MEX)	12.22m
Discus throw	Annie Alexander (TRI)	45.62m	Paulina Flores (MEX)	39.21m	Jodie Sutherland (TRI)	39.03m
Hammer throw	Aline Huerta (MEX)	54.51m CR	Roxana Goytortua (MEX)	50.08m	Zuleika Figueroa (PUR)	41.28m
Javelin throw	Taneisha Blair (JAM)	44.89m	Tracy Morrison (BAH)	44.69m	Sabina Christmas (DMA)	40.14m
Heptathlon	Flor Adalguisa Morales (MEX)	4282	Ana Carolina Ruiz (MEX)	4028	Shanise Wright (BAH)	3503
5000 m race walk	Marandeliz Arroyo (PUR)	26:03.94	María Guajardo (MEX)	28:24.84		
4×100 metres relay	Jamaica; Kettiany Clarke; Anastasia Le-Roy; Naffene Briscoe; Schillonie Calvert	44.74	Bahamas; Tia Rolle; T'Shonda Webb; Lanece Clarke; Sheniqua Ferguson	45.71	Trinidad and Tobago; Jurnelle Francis; Semoy Hackett; Reyare Thomas; Michelle de Landro	45.75
4×400 metres relay	Jamaica; Andrea Reid; Sherene Pinnock; Bobby-Gaye Wilkins; Sonita Sutherland	3:36.02	Trinidad and Tobago; Karla Hope; Desiree John; Kelly-Ann Romeo; Janeil Bellille	3:42.31	Puerto Rico; Zuleika Torres; Arianex Rivera; Arelys Caro; Kathyenid Rivera	3:49.09

=== Male Junior B (under 17) ===
Event	Gold		Silver		Bronze	
100 metres (1.8 m/s)	Nickel Ashmeade (JAM)	10.60	Dexter Lee (JAM)	10.68	Kendall Bacchus (TRI)	10.73
200 metres (1.6 m/s)	Ramone McKenzie (JAM)	21.17	Nickel Ashmeade (JAM)	21.30	Kendall Bacchus (TRI)	21.74
400 metres	Ramone McKenzie (JAM)	47.59	Kadeem Smith (SKN)	48.70	Akino Ming (JAM)	48.76
800 metres	Gavyn Nero (TRI)	1:56.57	Donahue Williams (JAM)	1:57.22	Kenneth Wallace-Whitfield (BAH)	1:57.37
1500 metres	Gavyn Nero (TRI)	4:02.95	Matthew Spring (BER)	4:04.23	Omar Xicale (MEX)	4:04.75
3000 metres	Gavyn Nero (TRI)	9:00.21	Omar Xicale (MEX)	9:03.40	Cristian Quintanilla (ESA)	9:04.39
100 metres hurdles (1.7 m/s)	Emilio Estrada (MEX)	13.57	Kimarcley Henry (JAM)	14.17	Kristen Hepburn-Taylor (BAH)	14.31
400 metres hurdles	Nathan Arnett (BAH)	52.62 CR	Dwight Robinson (JAM)	53.26	Kemar Norgrove (BAR)	55.50
2000 m steeplechase	Fernando Hernández (MEX)	6:19.62	Luis D. Bernardi (PUR)	7:02.43		
High jump	Raymond Higgs (BAH)	2.02m	Edgar Rivera (MEX)	1.99m	Daniel Burke (BAR)	1.93m
Pole vault	David A. Díaz (PUR)	4.50m CR	Rubén Viveros (MEX)	4.20m	Vernal McIntosh (BAH)	3.20m
Long jump	Tarick Batchelor (JAM)	7.22m (1.1 m/s)	Jerome Myers (JAM)	6.86m (0.9 m/s)	Hugo Coronado (MEX)	6.74m (0.7 m/s)
Triple jump	Gerard Brown (BAH)	14.78m (0.0 m/s)	Raymond Higgs (BAH)	14.74m (0.0 m/s)	Christopher Waugh (JAM)	14.24m (0.0 m/s)
Shot put	Juan Ramón Paredes (MEX)	15.00m	Fernando Troncoso (MEX)	14.86m	Omar Bryan (JAM)	14.62m
Discus throw	Omar Bryan (JAM)	52.77m CR	Fernando Troncoso (MEX)	50.47m	Giovanni Ramos (PUR)	42.38m
Hammer throw	Jean Rosario (PUR)	56.33m				
Javelin throw	Ramon Burgess (BAR)	59.63m	Davis Hypolite (DMA)	52.77m	Trevor Ifill (BAR)	51.97m
Octathlon	Shane Brathwaite (BAR)	4599	Fabian Norgrove (BAR)	4245	Fernando Torres (PUR)	4175
5000 m race walk	Rafael Avendaño (MEX)	21:52.47	Pedro Daniel Gómez (MEX)	22:50.59		
4×100 metres relay	Jamaica; Jerome Myers; Ramone McKenzie; Nickel Ashmeade; Dexter Lee	40.83	Trinidad and Tobago; Kwasi King; Joel Dillon; Aaron Fernandez; Kendall Bacchus	41.90	Barbados; Everton Greenidge; Rommel Waithe; Jerron Gooding; Anthony Rollins	42.10
4×400 metres relay	Jamaica; Dwight Robinson; Donahue Williams; Akino Ming; Ramone McKenzie	3:17.05	Trinidad and Tobago; Jameel Alleyne-Walcott; Akini Thomas; Trevis Frederick; Jevon Matthew	3:19.01	Bahamas; Triedecio Davis; Nathan Arnett; Darion Duncombe; Kenn Wallace-Whitfield	3:19.47

=== Female Junior B (under 17) ===
Event	Gold		Silver		Bronze	
100 metres (0.7 m/s)	Carrie Russell (JAM)	11.79	Cadajah Spencer (TRI)	11.84	Danielle Jeffrey (JAM)	11.97
200 metres (3.2 m/s)	Carrie Russell (JAM)	23.75 w	Cadajah Spencer (TRI)	23.86 w	Nivea Smith (BAH)	24.23 w
400 metres	Latoya McDermott (JAM)	54.10	Merica Moncherry (LCA)	55.15	Jessica James (TRI)	56.60
800 metres	Natoya Goule (JAM)	2:09.15	Brenda Salmerón (ESA)	2:12.63	Gladys Landaverde (ESA)	2:13.86
1200 metres	Natoya Goule (JAM)	3:33.74	Brenda Salmerón (ESA)	3:34.03	Gladys Landaverde (ESA)	3:34.12
100 metres hurdles (1.3 m/s)	Kierre Beckles (BAR)	13.72 CR	Shermaine Williams (JAM)	13.79	Rosemarie Carty (JAM)	13.86
300 metres hurdles	Kierre Beckles (BAR)	41.55	Krystal Bodie (BAH)	41.81	Sparkle McKnight (TRI)	43.36
High jump	Misha-Gayle Dacosta (JAM)	1.69m	Jeanelle Ovid (TRI)	1.63m	Deandra Daniel (TRI)	1.60m
Long jump	Jasmine Brunson (BER)	5.56m (-0.6 m/s)	Chantel Malone (IVB)	5.34m (-0.5 m/s)	Maritza Heredia (MEX)	5.33m (-0.2 m/s)
Triple jump	Estefany M. Cruz (GUA)	12.08m (0.0 m/s)	Jasmine Brunson (BER)	11.34m (1.1 m/s)	Yushani Durrant (JAM)	11.29m (0.8 m/s)
Shot put	Deandra Dottin (BAR)	11.95m	Hilenn James (TRI)	11.94m	Akeela Bravo (TRI)	11.77m
Discus throw	Alexandra Terry (CAY)	34.37m	Akeela Bravo (TRI)	33.11m	Jennie Jacques (BAH)	28.31m
Javelin throw	Deandra Dottin (BAR)	39.92m CR	Nahomi Rivera (PUR)	37.03	Abigaíl Gómez (MEX)	34.64
Pentathlon	Nahomi Rivera (PUR)	3415	Kanishque Todman (IVB)	2772	Marcela Martínez (MEX)	2535
4000 m race walk	Jamy Franco (GUA)	20:24.68 CR	Dulce Angélica Arrieta (MEX)	20:29.00	Wilane Cuevas (PUR)	21:04.29
4×100 metres relay	Jamaica; Rosemarie Carty; Carrie Russell; Antonique Campbell; Danesha Norris	45.50	Trinidad and Tobago; Kirlene Roberts; Nyoka Giles; Michelle Lee Ahye; Cadajah Spencer	45.70	Bahamas; Iesha White; Carlene Johnson; V'Alonee Robinson; Nivea Smith	46.31
4×400 metres relay	Jamaica; Sanchia Lee; Latoya McDermott; Rosemarie Carty; Natoya Goule	3:45.31	Trinidad and Tobago; Naomi Reyes; Jessica James; Shameyal Simon; Sparkle McKnight	3:47.28	Barbados; Kierre Beckles; Latoya Griffith; Sade Greene; Sade Sealy	3:47.38

== Medal table ==
The medal count was published.

=== Total ===
 * Host nation (Trinidad and Tobago)

Rank	Nation	Gold	Silver	Bronze	Total
1	Jamaica (JAM)	32	16	11	59
2	Trinidad and Tobago (TTO)*	10	17	12	39
3	Barbados (BAR)	8	4	8	20
4	Bahamas (BAH)	3	9	11	23
5	Guatemala (GUA)	3	0	0	3
6	Bermuda (BER)	2	3	1	6
7	Dominica (DMA)	1	1	2	4
8	Cayman Islands (CAY)	1	0	1	2
9	El Salvador (ESA)	0	2	5	7
10	British Virgin Islands (IVB)	0	2	1	3
11	Honduras (HON)	0	2	0	2
12	Saint Kitts and Nevis (SKN)	0	1	0	1
12	Saint Lucia (LCA)	0	1	0	1
14	Commonwealth Games Federation (CGF)	0	0	1	1
Totals (14 entries)		60	58	53	171

=== Sub 20 ===
 * Host nation (Trinidad and Tobago)

Rank	Nation	Gold	Silver	Bronze	Total
1	Jamaica (JAM)	17	9	5	31
2	Mexico (MEX)	9	9	7	25
3	Trinidad and Tobago (TTO)*	7	8	6	21
4	Puerto Rico (PUR)	5	4	7	16
5	Barbados (BAR)	2	3	3	8
6	Bermuda (BER)	1	1	1	3
7	Dominica (DMA)	1	0	2	3
8	Guatemala (GUA)	1	0	0	1
9	Bahamas (BAH)	0	7	4	11
10	Honduras (HON)	0	2	0	2
11	El Salvador (ESA)	0	0	2	2
12	British Virgin Islands (IVB)	0	0	1	1
12	Cayman Islands (CAY)	0	0	1	1
12	Commonwealth Games Federation (CGF)	0	0	1	1
Totals (14 entries)		43	43	40	126

=== Sub 17 ===
 * Host nation (Trinidad and Tobago)

Rank	Nation	Gold	Silver	Bronze	Total
1	Jamaica (JAM)	15	7	6	28
2	Barbados (BAR)	6	1	5	12
3	Mexico (MEX)	4	7	5	16
4	Trinidad and Tobago (TTO)*	3	9	6	18
5	Bahamas (BAH)	3	2	7	12
6	Guatemala (GUA)	2	0	0	2
7	Bermuda (BER)	1	2	0	3
8	Cayman Islands (CAY)	1	0	0	1
9	El Salvador (ESA)	0	2	3	5
10	British Virgin Islands (IVB)	0	2	0	2
11	Dominica (DMA)	0	1	0	1
11	Saint Kitts and Nevis (SKN)	0	1	0	1
11	Saint Lucia (LCA)	0	1	0	1
Totals (13 entries)		35	35	32	102

=== Remarks ===
^{1)}: Jamaica: count of bronze medals for sub-17 is 6 (rather than 7 as published), total is 28 (rather than 29 as published).

^{2)}: Mexico: count of bronze medals for sub-17 is 5 (rather than 6 as published), total is 16 (rather than 17 as published). Total count of gold medals is 13 (rather than 14 as published), total is 41 (rather than 42 as published).

^{3)}: Bahamas: Total count of bronze medals is 11 (rather than 13 as published).

^{4)}: Puerto Rico: Total count of gold medals is 8 considering U-17 hammer throw.

== Team trophies ==
Team trophies were distributed to the 1st place of the women category, to the 1st place of the men category, and to the 1st place overall (men and women categories). However, points were only published for the overall (men and women combined) Sub-20 and Sub-17 categories. Working through the results yields the following unofficial ranking.

=== Overall ===
The host country is highlighted in lavender blue

Rank	Nation	Points
1st place, gold medalist(s)	Jamaica	511.5
2	Mexico	341.5
3	Trinidad and Tobago	336.5
4	Bahamas	306
5	Puerto Rico	279
6	Barbados	206.5
7	Bermuda	67.5
8	El Salvador	58
9	Saint Kitts and Nevis	55
10	British Virgin Islands	44
11	Dominica	42
12	Honduras	34
13	Guatemala	32
14	Cayman Islands	30
15	Saint Lucia	19.5
16	Costa Rica	18
17	Guyana	16
18	Anguilla	12
18	Grenada	12
20	Turks and Caicos Islands	8
21	Netherlands Antilles	7
22	Aruba	6
22	Saint Vincent and the Grenadines	6

=== Male ===
The host country is highlighted in lavender blue

Rank	Nation	Points
1st place, gold medalist(s)	Jamaica	274.5
2	Mexico	212.5
3	Bahamas	160
4	Puerto Rico	146
5	Trinidad and Tobago	144.5
6	Barbados	131
7	Honduras	34
8	Saint Kitts and Nevis	34
9	El Salvador	32
10	Dominica	31
11	Bermuda	21
12	Cayman Islands	18
13	Saint Lucia	12.5
14	Grenada	12
15	Guatemala	11
16	Turks and Caicos Islands	8
17	British Virgin Islands	7
18	Netherlands Antilles	7
19	Saint Vincent and the Grenadines	6
20	Anguilla	5
21	Guyana	4
22	Aruba	3

=== Female ===
The host country is highlighted in lavender blue

Rank	Nation	Points
1st place, gold medalist(s)	Jamaica	237
2	Trinidad and Tobago	192
3	Bahamas	146
4	Puerto Rico	133
5	Mexico	129
6	Barbados	75.5
7	Bermuda	46.5
8	British Virgin Islands	37
9	El Salvador	26
10	Guatemala	21
11	Saint Kitts and Nevis	21
12	Costa Rica	18
13	Cayman Islands	12
14	Guyana	12
15	Dominica	11
16	Saint Lucia	7
17	Anguilla	7
18	Aruba	3

=== Remarks ===
The published points and corresponding ranks for the Sub-20 category contain 3rd place ties for Jamaica and Mexico, 4th place ties for Barbados and Bermuda, and 5th place ties for Trinidad & Tobago and St. Lucia. However, there is no evidence in the published results. Rather, corresponding ties are evident in the Sub-17 category, where they are already taken into account. Correcting the published Sub-20 point scheme correspondingly, it can be verified that the calculated points from the above tables are completely in line with the published point tables.

== Participation ==
Detailed result lists can be found on the CACAC, on the CFPI and on the World Junior Athletics History website. An unofficial count yields the number of about 440 athletes from about 24 countries:

- Anguilla (7)
- Aruba (5)
- Bahamas (55)
- Barbados (34)
- Bermuda (10)
- British Virgin Islands (11)
- Cayman Islands (7)
- Costa Rica (4)
- Dominica (6)
- El Salvador (6)
- Grenada (3)
- Guatemala (4)
- Guyana (8)
- Honduras (6)
- Jamaica (68)
- (Mexico) México (61)
- Netherlands Antilles (6)
- Puerto Rico (50)
- Saint Kitts and Nevis (20)
- Saint Lucia (3)
- Saint Vincent and the Grenadines (13)
- Trinidad and Tobago (53)
- Turks and Caicos Islands (7)
- U.S. Virgin Islands (2)
