= Shakera Reece =

Barbadian sprinter (born 1988)

Personal information
- Born: 31 August 1988 (age 37) Barbados
- Height: 1.63 m (5 ft 4 in)

Sport
- Country: Barbados
- Sport: Track and field
- Event: Sprints
- College team: Rice Owls

Achievements and titles
- Personal best: 100m 11.26 sec (2012)
Medal record
Women's athletics
Representing Barbados
Pan American Games
Bronze medal – third place	2011 Guadalajara	100 m
CARIFTA Games Junior (U20)
Gold medal – first place	2007 Providenciales	100 m

Shakera Kiella Valena Reece, (born 31 August 1988) is a Barbadian sprinter, who won a bronze medal at the 2011 Pan American Games.

Reece competed for Rice University. At Rice, Reece competed in sprinting events, such as the 100 meter dash and 200 meter dash. She ran 11.34 in the 100 meter dash in 2007 in Turks & Caicos to place first at the 2007 CARIFTA Games Under-20 championships.
