= Ramone McKenzie =

Jamaican sprinter (born 1990)

Personal information
- Nationality: Jamaica
- Born: 15 November 1990 (age 35) Saint Catherine, Jamaica
- Height: 6.2
- Weight: 190

Sport
- Sport: Running
- Event(s): 100 metres, 200 metres

Achievements and titles
- Personal best(s): 100 m: 10.10 s (Clermont 2012) 200 m: 20.54 s (Kingston 2012) 400 m: 46.62 s (Kingston 2008)
Medal record
Men's athletics
Representing Jamaica
CAC Championships
Bronze medal – third place	2009 Havana	200 m
NACAC U-23 Championships
Silver medal – second place	2010 Miramar	4 × 100 meters
Bronze medal – third place	2012 Irapuato	4 × 100 meters
Pan American Junior Championships
Bronze medal – third place	2009 Port of Spain	200 m
Bronze medal – third place	2009 Port of Spain	4 × 100 m relay
CARIFTA Games (Junior)
Gold medal – first place	2007 Providenciales	200 m
Gold medal – first place	2007 Providenciales	4 × 100 m relay
Gold medal – first place	2007 Providenciales	4 × 400 m relay
Gold medal – first place	2008 Basseterre	4 × 100 m relay
Gold medal – first place	2008 Basseterre	4 × 400 m relay
Gold medal – first place	2009 Vieux Fort	4 × 100 m relay
Silver medal – second place	2008 Basseterre	200 m
Silver medal – second place	2009 Vieux Fort	200 m
World Youth Championships
Gold medal – first place	2007 Ostrava	200 m
Bronze medal – third place	2007 Ostrava	Medley relay
CAC Junior Championships (U17)
Gold medal – first place	2006 Port of Spain	200 m
Gold medal – first place	2006 Port of Spain	400 m
Gold medal – first place	2006 Port of Spain	4 × 100 m relay
Gold medal – first place	2006 Port of Spain	4 × 400 m relay
CARIFTA Games (Youth)
Gold medal – first place	2006 Les Abymes	4 × 100 m relay
Gold medal – first place	2006 Les Abymes	4 × 400 m relay
Silver medal – second place	2006 Les Abymes	200 m

Ramone McKenzie (born 15 November 1990) is a Jamaican retired sprinter who specialised in the 100 and 200 metres. He turned professional on 2 November 2009, now being trained by American coach Lance Brauman.

== Career ==
He started his international career at the 2006 CARIFTA Games in the youth category (U-17) winning an individual silver medal in 200 metres, and two gold medals as a member of the 4 × 100 m and 4 × 400 m relay teams. He was part of the Jamaican team at the 2009 World Championships in Athletics and participated in the 200 metres, but did not make it into the quarterfinals.

== Personal best ==
Distance	Time	venue
100 m	10.10 s	Clermont, United States, 19 May 2012
200 m	20.54 s	Kingston, Jamaica, 30 June 2012
400 m	46.62 s	Kingston, Jamaica, 14 March 2008

== Achievements ==
Year	Competition	Venue	Position	Event	Notes
Representing Jamaica
2006	CARIFTA Games (U-17)	Les Abymes, Guadeloupe	2nd	200 m	21.56 (0.0 m/s)
2006	CARIFTA Games (U-17)	Les Abymes, Guadeloupe	1st	4 × 100 m relay	41.39
2006	CARIFTA Games (U-17)	Les Abymes, Guadeloupe	1st	4 × 400 m relay	3:18.44
2006	Central American and Caribbean Junior Championships (U-17)	Port of Spain, Trinidad and Tobago	1st	200 m	21.17 (1.6 m/s)
2006	Central American and Caribbean Junior Championships (U-17)	Port of Spain, Trinidad and Tobago	1st	400 m	47.59
2006	Central American and Caribbean Junior Championships (U-17)	Port of Spain, Trinidad and Tobago	1st	4 × 100 m relay	40.83
2006	Central American and Caribbean Junior Championships (U-17)	Port of Spain, Trinidad and Tobago	1st	4 × 400 m relay	3:17.05
2006	World Junior Championships	Beijing, China	6th	4 × 400 m relay	3:08.28
2007	CARIFTA Games (U-20)	Providenciales, Turks and Caicos Islands	1st	200 m	20.58 (0.7 m/s)
2007	CARIFTA Games (U-20)	Providenciales, Turks and Caicos Islands	1st	4 × 100 m relay	39.47
2007	CARIFTA Games (U-20)	Providenciales, Turks and Caicos Islands	1st	4 × 400 m relay	3:07.10 CR
2007	World Youth Championships	Ostrava, Czech Republic	1st	200 m	20.67 (-0.2 m/s)
2007	World Youth Championships	Ostrava, Czech Republic	3rd	Medley relay (100 m + 200 m + 300 m + 400 m)	1:52.18
2008	CARIFTA Games (U-20)	Basseterre, Saint Kitts and Nevis	2nd	200 m	20.33 w (5.2 m/s)
2008	CARIFTA Games (U-20)	Basseterre, Saint Kitts and Nevis	1st	4 × 100 m relay	39.80
2008	CARIFTA Games (U-20)	Basseterre, Saint Kitts and Nevis	1st	4 × 400 m relay	3:09.71
2008	World Junior Championships	Bydgoszcz, Poland	20th (sf)	200 m	21.60 (-0.1 m/s)
2008	World Junior Championships	Bydgoszcz, Poland	1st (h)	4 × 400 m relay	3:09.17 (only in heat)
2009	CARIFTA Games (U-20)	Vieux Fort, Saint Lucia	2nd	200 m	21.60 w (2.3 m/s)
2009	CARIFTA Games (U-20)	Vieux Fort, Saint Lucia	1st	4 × 100 m relay	40.05
2009	World Championships	Berlin, Germany	29th (h)	200 m	20.97 (-0.7 m/s)
2010	NACAC U23 Championships	Miramar, United States	4th	200 m	20.94 (wind: +2.8 m/s) w
2010	NACAC U23 Championships	Miramar, United States	2nd	4 × 100 m relay	39.36
2010	NACAC U23 Championships	Miramar, United States	4th	4 × 400 m relay	3:10.71
2012	NACAC U23 Championships	Irapuato, Mexico	11th (h)	100 m	10.46 (wind: 1.2 m/s) A
2012	NACAC U23 Championships	Irapuato, Mexico	5th	200 m	20.75 (wind: -0.5 m/s) A
2012	NACAC U23 Championships	Irapuato, Mexico	3rd	4 × 100 m relay	39.67 A
