= Sade Sealy =

Barbadian athlete (born 1991)

Personal information
- Born: November 18, 1991 (age 34)
- Education: Illinois State University
- Height: 5’ 7
- Weight: 142 lb (64 kg)

Sport
- Sport: Athletics
- Event(s): 400 m, 800 m
- College team: Illinois State Redbirds

Sade Sealy (born 18 November 1991) is a Barbadian athlete competing in the 400 and 800 metres. She represented her country in the 400 metres at the 2013 World Championships without advancing from the first round. After switching to the 800 metres she finished fourth at the 2019 Pan American Games in a new national record of 2:02.23.

== International competitions ==
Year	Competition	Venue	Position	Event	Notes
Representing Barbados
2006	CARIFTA Games (U17)	Les Abymes, Guadeloupe	4th	400 m	56.65
2006	CARIFTA Games (U17)	Les Abymes, Guadeloupe	4th	4 × 100 m relay	47.05
2006	CARIFTA Games (U17)	Les Abymes, Guadeloupe	3rd	4 × 400 m relay	3:49.78
2006	Central American and Caribbean; Junior Championships (U18)	Port of Spain, Trinidad and Tobago	4th	400 m	56.68
2006	Central American and Caribbean; Junior Championships (U18)	Port of Spain, Trinidad and Tobago	3rd	4 × 400 m relay	3:47.38
2007	CARIFTA Games (U17)	Providenciales, Turks and Caicos Islands	2nd	400 m	55.47
2007	CARIFTA Games (U17)	Providenciales, Turks and Caicos Islands	3rd	800 m	2:15.65
2007	World Youth Championships	Ostrava, Czech Republic	13th (sf)	400 m	56.14
2007	World Youth Championships	Ostrava, Czech Republic	6th	Medley relay	2:11.37
2008	CARIFTA Games (U20)	Basseterre, Saint Kitts and Nevis	4th	400 m	55.19
2008	CARIFTA Games (U20)	Basseterre, Saint Kitts and Nevis	3rd	4 × 100 m relay	45.75
2008	CARIFTA Games (U20)	Basseterre, Saint Kitts and Nevis	3rd	4 × 400 m relay	3:44.41
2009	CARIFTA Games (U20)	Vieux Fort, Saint Lucia	4th	400 m	54.84
2009	CARIFTA Games (U20)	Vieux Fort, Saint Lucia	5th	800 m	2:10.67
2009	CARIFTA Games (U20)	Vieux Fort, Saint Lucia	2nd	4 × 400 m relay	3:41.75
2010	CARIFTA Games (U20)	George Town, Cayman Islands	4th	400 m	54.81
2010	CARIFTA Games (U20)	George Town, Cayman Islands	3rd	4 × 400 m relay	3:41.30
2010	Central American and Caribbean; Junior Championships (U20)	Santo Domingo, Dominican Republic	8th (h)	400 m	55.78
2010	World Junior Championships	Moncton, Canada	19th (sf)	400 m	54.90
2011	Central American and Caribbean Championships	Mayagüez, Puerto Rico	14th (h)	400 m	55.11
2012	NACAC U23 Championships	Irapuato, Mexico	9th (h)	400 m	55.38
2013	Central American and Caribbean Championships	Morelia, Mexico	10th (h)	400 m	54.09
2013	World Championships	Moscow, Russia	34th (h)	400 m	55.45
2015	Pan American Games	Toronto, Canada	7th (h)	4 × 400 m relay	3:31.72^{1}
2015	NACAC Championships	San José, Costa Rica	8th	400 m	54.00
2018	Central American and Caribbean Games	Barranquilla, Colombia	8th	800 m	2:06.75
2018	NACAC Championships	Toronto, Canada	8th	800 m	2:05.08
2019	Pan American Games	Lima, Peru	4th	800 m	2:02.23

^{1}Disqualified in the final

== Personal bests ==
Outdoor

- 200 metres – 23.80 (+1.8 m/s, Des Moines 2013)
- 400 metres – 52.01 (Des Moines 2013)
- 800 metres – 2:02.23 (Lima 2019) NR
- 1500 metres – 4:25.61 (Bridgetown 2020) NR
- 400 metres hurdles – 1:01.07 (Charleston 2012)

Indoor

- 200 metres – 24.61 (Cedar Falls 2013)
- 400 metres – 54.14 (Cedar Falls 2013)
- 800 metres – 2:16.40 (Normal 2012)
