= Nathan Arnett =

Bahamian sprinter and hurdler

Personal information
- Born: December 15, 1990 (age 35)
Medal record
Athletics
Representing Bahamas
CAC Junior Championships (U20)
Gold medal – first place	2006 Port of Spain	400m Hurdles
Bronze medal – third place	2006 Port of Spain	4 x 400 m relay
CARIFTA Games Junior (U17)
Gold medal – first place	2007 Providenciales	400m Hurdles
Bronze medal – third place	2007 Providenciales	4 x 400 m relay
CARIFTA Games Junior (U17)
Silver medal – second place	2005 Bacolet, Tobago	400m Hurdles
Bronze medal – third place	2005 Bacolet, Tobago	4 x 400 m relay

Nathan Arnett (born December 15, 1990) is a male hurdler from Nassau, Bahamas, who mainly competes in the 400m Hurdles and 110m Hurdles. He attended St. Augustine's College in Nassau, Bahamas, before going on to compete for Iowa Central Community College and Mississippi State University.

== Personal bests ==
Event	Time (seconds)	Venue	Date
400m	48.81	Auburn, Alabama	21 APR 2012
400m Hurdles	50.27	Hutchinson, Kansas	21 MAY 2011
110m Hurdles	13.83	Irapuato, Mexico	07 JUL 2012
