= 2007 CARIFTA Games =

XXXVI CARIFTA Games
- Dates: April 7–9
- Host city: Providenciales, Turks and Caicos Islands
- Venue: National Stadium
- Level: Junior and Youth
- Events: 66 (35 junior (incl. 5 open), 31 youth)
- Participation: about 454 (254 junior, 200 youth) athletes from about 26 nations
- Records set: 12 games 14 national (senior)

The 36th CARIFTA Games was held in the National Stadium on the island of Providenciales, Turks and Caicos Islands, on April 7–9, 2007. Detailed reports on the results were given.

== Participation (unofficial) ==
Result lists can be found on the CACAC website, on the C.F.P.I. Timing website, on the IslandStats website, and on the World Junior Athletics History website. An unofficial count yields the number of about 454 athletes (254 junior (under-20) and 200 youth (under-17)) from about 26 countries:

Anguilla (7), Antigua and Barbuda (4), Aruba (4), Bahamas (59), Barbados (31), Belize (2), Bermuda (18), British Virgin Islands (7), Cayman Islands (18), Dominica (7), French Guiana (1), Grenada (13), Guadeloupe (18), Guyana (2), Haiti (12), Jamaica (70), Martinique (34), Montserrat (2), Netherlands Antilles (11), Saint Kitts and Nevis (33), Saint Lucia (5), Saint Vincent and the Grenadines (3), Suriname (3), Trinidad and Tobago (46), Turks and Caicos Islands (35), U.S. Virgin Islands (9).

== Records ==
A total of 12 new games records were set.

In the boys' U-20 category, Jamaican sprinter Yohan Blake already set the new 100m record to 10.18s (1.5 m/s) in the heat, before improving it again to 10.11s in the final. Ryan Brathwaite from Barbados also improved (his own) 110 metres hurdles games record twice: first, he achieved 13.65s (-1.0 m/s) in the heat, before setting the final mark to 13.42s in the final. Jamaal Wilson from the Bahamas defended his high jump title jumping the new record height of 2.20m. Raymond Brown won the shot put establishing the new games record of 18.27m. And the Jamaican 4×400 metres relay team set the new games record to 3:07.10.

In the girls' U-20 category, the 100 metres hurdles record was improved to 13.51s (1.3 m/s) by Shermaine Williams from Jamaica.

In the boys' U-17 category, Dexter Lee of Jamaica set two new games records, both in 100 metres (10.34s), and in 200 metres (21.09s). His compatriot Kemoy Campbell also set two new games records in 1500 metres (4:00.04), and 3000 metres (8:46.49). And as in the U-20 category, the records fell in high jump and shot put: Raymond Higgs from the Bahamas jumped 2.13m, whereas Quincy Wilson from Trinidad and Tobago reached 16.27m.

In the girls' U-17 category, Deandra Dottin from Barbados threw 42.90m, a width that has not been reached before at the games with the new javelin introduced in 1999.

Moreover, a total of 14 national (senior) records were set by the junior and youth athletes.

The most prominent is the new Barbadian record by Shakera Reece in the women's 100m in 11.34s (1.3 m/s). The new Anguillian record in high jump was set by youngster Shinelle Proctor to 1.60m. Amanda Edwards set the new record for Antigua and Barbuda for women in javelin throw to 41.11m. There were two new women's national records for the British Virgin Islands: Chantel Malone reached 12.29m in triple jump, and the 4×100 metres relay team finished in 46.69s. The 37.44 metres by Alexandra Terry were a new Caymanian record for women in discus throw. Sandisha Antoine set the women's record for Saint Lucia in triple jump to 12.11m.

Finally, there were a total of 7 new national records for the host nation Turks and Caicos Islands: in the men's sector, Robert Jennings needed 10:17.94 for 3000 metres, and the 4×100 metres relay finished in 42.04s. The new women's records were set by Kadisha Wickham (59.36s for 400 metres), Shanricka Williams (10:59.56 for 3000 metres), Israel Ramsey (4.80m in long jump), Marquita Carter (26.33m in discus throw), and the 4×100 metres relay team in 50.02s.

== Austin Sealy Award ==
The Austin Sealy Trophy for the most outstanding athlete of the games was awarded to Yohan Blake of Jamaica. He won 2 gold medals (100m, and 4 × 100 m relay) in the junior (U-20) category, setting the new 100m games record to 10.11s.

== Medal summary ==
Medal winners are published by category: Boys under 20 (Junior), Girls Under 20 (Junior), Boys under 17 (Youth) and Girls under 17 (Youth). Complete results can be found on the CACAC website, on the C.F.P.I. Timing website, on the IslandStats website, and on the World Junior Athletics History website.

=== Boys under 20 (Junior) ===
Event	Gold		Silver		Bronze	
100 metres (1.2 m/s)	Yohan Blake (JAM)	10.11 CR	Keston Bledman (TRI)	10.41	(Guadeloupe) /Nyls Nubret (GLP)	10.51
200 metres (0.7 m/s)	Ramone McKenzie (JAM)	20.58	Kemar Hyman (CAY)	21.10	Jovon Toppin (TRI)	21.30
400 metres	Zwede Hewitt (TRI)	47.14	Oshane Barham (JAM)	47.28	Ade Alleyne-Forte (TRI)	47.31
800 metres	Gavyn Nero (TRI)	1:52.12	Theon O'Connor (JAM)	1:52.73	Dwayne Ferguson (BAH)	1:52.74
1500 metres	Gavyn Nero (TRI)	4:01.46	Andre Thomas (JAM)	4:02.30	Conroy Crossman (JAM)	4:02.60
5000 metres	Ageyan Robinson (JAM)	16:08.26	Christian Rock (BAR)	16:13.58	Pierre Barreau (HAI)	16:14.04
110 metres hurdles (0.2 m/s)	Ryan Brathwaite (BAR)	13.42 CR	Keiron Stewart (JAM)	13.49	Andre Collins (JAM)	13.85
400 metres hurdles	Nathan Arnett (BAH)	51.11	Keiron Stewart (JAM)	51.52	Riker Hylton (JAM)	51.48
High jump	Jamaal Wilson (BAH)	2.20 CR	Julian Reid (JAM)	2.08	Therrold Murray (BAR)	2.00
Pole vault	Lorenzo Johnson (JAM)	4.00	Vernal McIntosh (BAH)	3.30		
Long jump	Julian Reid (JAM)	7.39 (-0.9 m/s)	Nicholas Gordon (JAM)	7.28 (-1.0 m/s)	Kyron Blaise (TRI)	7.17 (-1.8 m/s)
Triple jump	Ronson Small (BAR)	15.43 (-1.1 m/s)	Kyron Blaise (TRI)	15.34 (-1.5 m/s)	(Martinique) /Jérémie Varsovie (MTQ)	15.30 (-0.4 m/s)
Shot put	Raymond Brown (JAM)	18.27 CR	Shane Evans (CAY)	14.28	Emmanuel Stewart (TRI)	14.10
Discus throw	Raymond Brown (JAM)	49.95	Emmanuel Stewart (TRI)	48.04	(Martinique) /Jhovanie Legendart (MTQ)	47.39
Javelin throw	Albert Reynolds (LCA)	58.13	Trevor Ifill (BAR)	57.79	Jeffery Williams (TRI)	57.12
Heptathlon	Kurt Felix (GRN)	4675	Andrew Riley (JAM)	4601	Rashad Clarke (BAH)	4498
4 x 100 metres relay*	Jamaica; Kemar Marsden; Ramone McKenzie; Cawayne Jervis; Yohan Blake	39.47	Saint Kitts and Nevis; Miles Walters; Allister Clarke; Withley Williams; Antoine Adams	40.71	/Guadeloupe; Nyls Nubret; Yohan Dambas; Matthieu Boa; Carl Lhomond	40.77
4 x 400 metres relay	Jamaica; Kevin Williams; Riker Hylton; Oshane Barham; Ramone McKenzie	3:07.10 CR	Trinidad and Tobago	3:07.11	Bahamas; Demetrius Pinder; Juan Lewis; Nathan Arnett; Jerome Mitchell	3:09.28

* Result corrected because of disqualification. See Doping (below).

: Open event for both junior and youth athletes.

=== Girls under 20 (Junior) ===
Event	Gold		Silver		Bronze	
100 metres (1.3 m/s)	Shakera Reece (BAR)	11.34 NR	Schillonie Calvert (JAM)	11.61	Krystal Bodie (BAH)	11.63
200 metres (1.3 m/s)	Nivea Smith (BAH)	23.45	Britney St. Louis (TRI)	23.68	Shakera Reece (BAR)	23.75
400 metres	Bobby-Gaye Wilkins (JAM)	53.01	Kayan Robinson (JAM)	53.98	Janeil Bellille (TRI)	54.37
800 metres	Keno Heavens (JAM)	2:11.66	Vanessa Boyd (JAM)	2:12.16	(Martinique) /Cynthia Anais (MTQ)	2:12.68
1500 metres	Teneisha Davis (JAM)	4:41.16	Kimberly Brown (JAM)	4:44.48	Alika Morgan (GUY)	4:44.56
3000 metres	Teneisha Davis (JAM)	10:12.64	Alika Morgan (GUY)	10:12:94	Kimberly Brown (JAM)	10:32.38
100 metres hurdles (1.3 m/s)	Shermaine Williams (JAM)	13.51 CR	Natasha Ruddock (JAM)	13.95	Kierre Beckles (BAR)	14.03
400 metres hurdles	Shana-Gaye Tracey (JAM)	58.77	Andrea Reid (JAM)	59.79	Janeil Bellille (TRI)	59.88
High jump	Misha-Gaye Da Costa (BER)	1.74	(Guadeloupe) /Karen Jean-François (GLP)	1.71	(Guadeloupe) /Lyvie-Paola Laurent (GLP)	1.65
Long jump	Shara Proctor (AIA)	6.17 (-0.3 m/s)	Kimberly Williams (JAM)	6.15 (-0.1 m/s)	Tameka Williams (SKN)	6.14 (-0.6 m/s)
Triple jump	Kimberly Williams (JAM)	12.85 (-1.6 m/s)	Roseann Jones (JAM)	12.41 (-2.3 m/s)	(Martinique) /Keshia Willix (MTQ)	12.29 (-2.2 m/s)
Shot put	(Martinique) /Myriam Lixfe (MTQ)	15.16	(Martinique) /Gianni Robard (MTQ)	13.52	Akeela Bravo (TRI)	12.92
Discus throw	Latanya Nation (JAM)	42.25	Keneisha Throughsingh (JAM)	40.68	Gabrielle Nixon (BAH)	47.86
Javelin throw	Taneisha Blair (JAM)	43.64	Amanda Edwards (ATG)	41.11 NR	Venice Frederick (TRI)	34.29
Pentathlon	Salcia Slack (JAM)	3553	(Martinique) /Audilia Da Veiga (MTQ)	3452	Latanya Nation (JAM)	3305
4 x 100 metres relay	Bahamas; Iesha White; Krystal Bodie; Tia Rolle; Nivea Smith	44.94	Jamaica	45.02	Trinidad and Tobago	45.50
4 x 400 metres relay	Jamaica; Shana-Gaye Tracey; Kayan Robinson; Andrea Reid; Bobby-Gaye Wilkins	3:36.26	Trinidad and Tobago	3:42.79	/Martinique	3:48.78

: Open event for both junior and youth athletes.

=== Boys under 17 (Youth) ===
Event	Gold		Silver		Bronze	
100 metres (1.0 m/s)	Dexter Lee (JAM)	10.34 CR	Warren Fraser (BAH)	10.51	Jermaine Brown (JAM)	10.65
200 metres (1.2 m/s)	Dexter Lee (JAM)	21.09 CR	Jermaine Brown (JAM)	21.25	Shermund Allsop (TRI)	21.58
400 metres	Kirani James (GRN)	47.86	Kadeem Smith (SKN)	48.00	Dwayne Extol (JAM)	49.01
800 metres	Kenneth Wallace-Whitfield (BAH)	1:58.91	Donahue Williams (JAM)	1:59.60	Kadeem Smith (SKN)	2:00.14
1500 metres	Kemoy Campbell (JAM)	4:00.04 CR	Donohue Williams (JAM)	4:00.73	Matthew Spring (BER)	4:01.04
3000 metres	Kemoy Campbell (JAM)	8:46.49 CR	Matthew Spring (BER)	9:10.62	Delohni Nichol-Samuel (VIN)	9:11.19
100 metres hurdles (0.5 m/s)	Kimarley Henry (JAM)	13.28	Greggmar Swift (BAR)	13.39	D'Omar Boyden (JAM)	13.39
400 metres hurdles	Dwayne Extol (JAM)	55.75	Nejmi Burnside (BAH)	56.30	Kavean Smith (JAM)	56.87
High jump	Raymond Higgs (BAH)	2.13 CR	Machell Baker (JAM); Jovan Hardware (JAM)	1.95		
Long jump	Lenyn Leonce (LCA)	6.99 (0.0 m/s)	Dexter McKenzie (JAM)	6.94 (0.9 m/s)	Raymond Higgs (BAH)	6.83 (0.0 m/s)
Triple jump	Raymond Higgs (BAH)	14.79 (-2.0 m/s)	(Martinique) /Kévin Luron (MTQ)	14.27 (-1.9 m/s)	Seon Stafford (TRI)	13.97 (-2.2 m/s)
Shot put	Quincy Wilson (TRI)	16.27 CR	Shane Nedd (ARU)	14.96	Robert Collingwood (TRI)	14.57
Discus throw	Quincy Wilson (TRI)	52.79	Dillon Simon (DMA)	42.99	Richard Collingwood (TRI)	42.36
Javelin throw	Jamel Paul (TRI)	52.83	Jerron Franklyn (TRI)	52.40	Daneal Marshall (BAR)	51.40
4 x 100 metres relay	Jamaica	41.11	Trinidad and Tobago	42.08	Grenada	42.14
4 x 400 metres relay	Jamaica	3:16.31	Bahamas; Devon Creary; Fenton Williams; Nejmi Burnside; Kenneth Wallace-Whitfield	3:18.84	Trinidad and Tobago	3:22.57

=== Girls under 17 (Youth) ===
Event	Gold		Silver		Bronze	
100 metres (0.5 m/s)	Michelle-Lee Ahye (TRI)	11.76	Shanice Hazel (ISV)	11.78	Antonique Campbell (JAM)	11.86
200 metres (0.6 m/s)	Antonique Campbell (JAM)	23.78	Danesha Morris (JAM)	23.87	Mara Weekes (BAR)	24.17
400 metres	Mara Weekes (BAR)	54.71	Sade Sealy (BAR)	55.47	Jody-Ann Muir (JAM)	55.51
800 metres	Natoya Goule (JAM)	2:11.68	Jessica James (TRI)	2:14.89	Sade Sealy (BAR)	2:15.65
1500 metres	Natoya Goule (JAM)	4:36.26	Mackola Joseph (JAM)	4:42.75	Samantha Shukla (TRI)	4:49.03
100 metres hurdles (-0.1 m/s)	(Martinique) /Jessica Alcan (MTQ)	13.67	Lanice Hall (JAM)	14.19	Kenrisha Brathwaite (BAR)	14.39
300 metres hurdles	Lanice Hall (JAM)	43.04	Sparkle McKnight (TRI)	43.65	Kenrisha Brathwaite (BAR)	44.00
High jump	Kathie-Lee Laidley (JAM)	1.71	Jeanelle Ovid (TRI)	1.71	Jamilya Jordan (BAR)	1.71
Long jump	(Martinique) /Audilia da Veiga (MTQ)	5.75 (0.0 m/s)	Chantel Malone (IVB)	5.54 (0.1 m/s)	(Guadeloupe) /Ericka Cambronne (GLP)	5.49 (-0.4 m/s)
Triple jump	Chantel Malone (IVB)	12.29 NR	Sandisha Antoine (LCA)	12.11 NR	(Guadeloupe) /Cynthia Battah-Aoufoh (GLP)	11.98
Shot put	Deandra Dottin (BAR)	12.26	Candicea Barnard (JAM)	10.66	(Guadeloupe) /Angeline Viardot (GLP)	10.59
Discus throw	Deandra Dottin (BAR)	39.58	Alexandra Terry (CAY)	37.44 NR	Kaycia Greaves (JAM)	36.99
Javelin throw	Deandra Dottin (BAR)	42.90	(Martinique) /Laure Mongin (MTQ)	36.28	Kyshona Knight (BAR)	34.43
4 x 100 metres relay	Jamaica	45.56	Trinidad and Tobago	46.35	Bahamas	46.51
4 x 400 metres relay	Jamaica	3:43.79	Trinidad and Tobago	3:46.40	Bahamas	3:50.87

== Doping ==
* Jamie Payne from Trinidad and Tobago was tested positive for stanozolol and an elevated testosterone/epitestosterone (T/E) ratio. Therefore, a 2 years ineligibility (22 May 2007 – 21 May 2009), and a disqualification of all results from 17 March 2007 were imposed. As a consequence, the Trinidad and Tobago junior 4 × 100 m relay team (40.22s) lost the silver medal.

== Medal table (unofficial) ==
The official medal count was published. The mismatch between the unofficial count below and the published one is explained by the subsequent disqualification of the Trinidad and Tobago 4 x 100 metres junior relay team because of doping violations of one team member.

For the first time, the host country of the games did not win a medal.

Rank	Nation	Gold	Silver	Bronze	Total
1	Jamaica (JAM)	36	28	12	76
2	Trinidad and Tobago (TTO)	7	13	16	36
3	Barbados (BAR)	7	4	10	21
4	Bahamas (BAH)	7	4	8	19
5	Martinique (MTQ)	3	4	5	12
6	Saint Lucia (LCA)	2	1	0	3
7	Grenada (GRN)	2	0	1	3
8	British Virgin Islands (IVB)	1	2	0	3
9	Commonwealth Games Federation (CGF)	1	0	0	1
10	Cayman Islands (CAY)	0	3	0	3
11	Saint Kitts and Nevis (SKN)	0	2	2	4
12	Guadeloupe (GLP)	0	1	6	7
13	Bermuda (BER)	0	1	1	2
13	Guyana (GUY)	0	1	1	2
15	Antigua and Barbuda (ATG)	0	1	0	1
15	Aruba (ARU)	0	1	0	1
15	Dominica (DMA)	0	1	0	1
18	Haiti (HAI)	0	0	1	1
18	Saint Vincent and the Grenadines (VIN)	0	0	1	1
Totals (19 entries)		66	67	64	197
