= Krystal Bodie =

Bahamian sprinter

Personal information
- Born: January 3, 1990 (age 36)
Medal record
Athletics
Representing Bahamas
NACAC U-23 Championships
Silver medal – second place	2012 Irapuato	4x100 m relay
CAC Junior Championships (U17)
Silver medal – second place	2006 Port of Spain	300 m Hurdles
CARIFTA Games Junior (U20)
Gold medal – first place	2007 Providenciales	4x100 m relay
Gold medal – first place	2008 Basseterre	4x100 m relay
Bronze medal – third place	2007 Providenciales	100 m
Bronze medal – third place	2008 Basseterre	100 m Hurdles

Krystal Bodie (born January 3, 1990) is a Bahamian sprinter from Nassau, Bahamas who competed in the 100m and 100m Hurdles. She attended St. Augustine's College in Nassau, Bahamas, before going on to compete for Southwest Mississippi Community College and Auburn University where she was coached by Henry Rolle. Bodie competed at the 2008 World Junior Championships in Athletics in Bydgoszcz, Poland and the 2014 Commonwealth Games in Glasgow, Scotland.

Bodie is a multi medalist at the CARIFTA Games.

== Personal bests ==
Event	Time	Venue	Date
100 m	11.63 (+1.3)	Providenciales	07 APR 2007
200 m	24.07 (0.0)	Auburn, Alabama	17 APR 2010
100m Hurdles	13.36 (-0.1)	Nassau, Bahamas	27 JUN 2015
