= Bacolet =

Town in Trinidad and Tobago

Coordinates: 11°10′00″N 60°43′00″W

Bacolet is a town and suburb in the city of Scarborough on the island of Tobago, Republic of Trinidad and Tobago. The town itself lies beneath Fort King George at the Bacolet Bay, just outside the city center to the south-east of the island's capital. It is one of the most developed parts of Tobago, and much of the island's high society lives there. There are also many villas and hotels for tourists.

== Tourism ==
One such tourist destination is the Bacolet Beach Club, a retreat located on Bacolet Bay.

The Dwight Yorke Stadium is located in Bacolet.
