= 2007 NACAC Championships in Athletics – Results =

These are the official results of the 2007 North American, Central American and Caribbean Championships which took place on July 13–15, 2007 in San Salvador, El Salvador.

== Men's results ==
=== 100 meters ===
Heats
Wind:
Heat 1: +1.7 m/s, Heat 2: -1.9 m/s, Heat 3: -0.3 m/s

| Rank | Heat | Name | Nationality | Time | Notes |
|---|---|---|---|---|---|
| 1 | 1 | Delwayne Delaney | Saint Kitts and Nevis | 10.31 | Q |
| 2 | 2 | Richard Thompson | Trinidad and Tobago | 10.33 | Q |
| 3 | 3 | Monzavous Edwards | United States | 10.37 | Q |
| 4 | 2 | Abidemi Omole | United States | 10.39 | Q |
| 5 | 1 | Rolando Palacios | Honduras | 10.42 | Q |
| 6 | 2 | Carl Barrett | Jamaica | 10.49 | q |
| 7 | 1 | David Walters | United States Virgin Islands | 10.55 | q |
| 8 | 1 | Tristan Taylor | Jamaica | 10.55 | |
| 9 | 3 | Niconer Alexander | Trinidad and Tobago | 10.58 | Q |
| 10 | 3 | Brian Mariano | Netherlands Antilles | 10.60 | |
| 11 | 3 | Carlos García | Dominican Republic | 10.65 | |
| 12 | 2 | Kemar Hyman | Cayman Islands | 10.71 | |
| 13 | 3 | Adrian Durant | United States Virgin Islands | 10.75 | |
| 14 | 2 | Joel Báez | Dominican Republic | 10.88 | |
| 15 | 1 | Edwin Baltazar | Guatemala | 11.22 | |
| | 2 | Khalid Brooks | Anguilla | DQ | FS |

Final
Wind:
+0.8 m/s

| Rank | Name | Nationality | Time | Notes |
|---|---|---|---|---|
| 1st place, gold medalist(s) | Richard Thompson | Trinidad and Tobago | 10.322 | |
| 2nd place, silver medalist(s) | Monzavous Edwards | United States | 10.327 | |
| 3rd place, bronze medalist(s) | Abidemi Omole | United States | 10.34 | |
| 4 | Rolando Palacios | Honduras | 10.51 | |
| 5 | Delwayne Delaney | Saint Kitts and Nevis | 10.55 | |
| 6 | Carl Barrett | Jamaica | 10.59 | |
| 7 | David Walters | United States Virgin Islands | 10.78 | |
| | Niconer Alexander | Trinidad and Tobago | DNS | |

=== 200 meters ===
Heats
Wind:
Heat 1: -0.8 m/s, Heat 2: -0.3 m/s, Heat 3: -0.9 m/s

| Rank | Heat | Name | Nationality | Time | Notes |
|---|---|---|---|---|---|
| 1 | 1 | Michael Mitchell | United States | 20.57 | Q |
| 2 | 2 | Jordan Vaden | United States | 20.74 | Q |
| 3 | 3 | Chris Lloyd | Dominica | 20.74 | Q |
| 4 | 2 | Emmanuel Callander | Trinidad and Tobago | 21.18 | Q |
| 5 | 1 | Orlando Reid | Jamaica | 21.19 | Q |
| 6 | 3 | Delwayne Delaney | Saint Kitts and Nevis | 21.25 | Q |
| 7 | 2 | Rolando Palacios | Honduras | 21.26 | q |
| 8 | 2 | Robert Morton | Saint Kitts and Nevis | 21.28 | q |
| 9 | 1 | Félix Martínez | Puerto Rico | 21.47 | |
| 9 | 3 | Tyrell Cuffy | Cayman Islands | 21.47 | |
| 11 | 2 | Adalberto Amador | Puerto Rico | 21.50 | |
| 12 | 3 | Dewayne Barrett | Jamaica | 21.55 | |
| 13 | 1 | Ramon Gittens | Barbados | 21.69 | |
| 14 | 3 | Ronald Severino | Dominican Republic | 21.92 | |
| 15 | 2 | Pedro Mejía | Dominican Republic | 22.12 | |
| 16 | 1 | David Walters | United States Virgin Islands | 22.22 | |
| 17 | 1 | Mario Rigby | Turks and Caicos Islands | 22.33 | |
| 18 | 3 | Courtny Bascombe | Saint Vincent and the Grenadines | 22.36 | |
| 19 | 2 | Kevin Fahie | British Virgin Islands | 22.43 | |
| 20 | 1 | Edwin Baltazar | Guatemala | 22.45 | |
| 21 | 1 | Néstor Meza | El Salvador | 22.90 | |
| 22 | 2 | Nery Brenes | Costa Rica | 25.64 | |

Final
Wind:
+1.8 m/s

| Rank | Name | Nationality | Time | Notes |
|---|---|---|---|---|
| 1st place, gold medalist(s) | Jordan Vaden | United States | 20.17 | |
| 2nd place, silver medalist(s) | Michael Mitchell | United States | 20.48 | |
| 3rd place, bronze medalist(s) | Chris Lloyd | Dominica | 20.73 | |
| 4 | Delwayne Delaney | Saint Kitts and Nevis | 20.83 | |
| 5 | Emmanuel Callander | Trinidad and Tobago | 20.93 | |
| 6 | Orlando Reid | Jamaica | 21.25 | |
| 7 | Rolando Palacios | Honduras | 21.26 | |
| 8 | Robert Morton | Saint Kitts and Nevis | 21.60 | |

=== 400 meters ===
Heats

| Rank | Heat | Name | Nationality | Time | Notes |
|---|---|---|---|---|---|
| 1 | 1 | Michael Mason | Jamaica | 46.30 | Q |
| 2 | 1 | Arismendy Peguero | Dominican Republic | 46.31 | Q |
| 3 | 1 | David Neville | United States | 46.32 | Q |
| 4 | 2 | Nery Brenes | Costa Rica | 46.47 | Q |
| 5 | 2 | Yoel Tapia | Dominican Republic | 46.63 | Q |
| 6 | 2 | Calvin Smith Jr. | United States | 46.66 | Q |
| 7 | 2 | Lansford Spence | Jamaica | 46.79 | q |
| 8 | 1 | Jarrin Solomon | Trinidad and Tobago | 47.08 | q |
| 9 | 1 | Héctor Carrasquillo | Puerto Rico | 47.60 | |
| 10 | 1 | Takeshi Fujiwara | El Salvador | 47.75 | |
| 11 | 1 | Mario Rigby | Turks and Caicos Islands | 48.49 | |
| 12 | 2 | Melville Rogers | Saint Kitts and Nevis | 48.58 | |
| 13 | 2 | Charmant Ollivierre | Saint Vincent and the Grenadines | 49.06 | |
| 14 | 1 | Calvin Dascent | United States Virgin Islands | 49.54 | |
| 15 | 2 | César Cornejo | El Salvador | 51.34 | |

Final

| Rank | Name | Nationality | Time | Notes |
|---|---|---|---|---|
| 1st place, gold medalist(s) | Calvin Smith Jr. | United States | 45.52 | |
| 2nd place, silver medalist(s) | Arismendy Peguero | Dominican Republic | 45.63 | |
| 3rd place, bronze medalist(s) | Nery Brenes | Costa Rica | 46.00 | |
| 4 | Michael Mason | Jamaica | 46.03 | |
| 5 | Yoel Tapia | Dominican Republic | 46.09 | |
| 6 | Jarrin Solomon | Trinidad and Tobago | 47.09 | |
| | Lansford Spence | Jamaica | DNF | |
| | David Neville | United States | DNS | |

=== 800 meters ===
Heats

| Rank | Heat | Name | Nationality | Time | Notes |
|---|---|---|---|---|---|
| 1 | 2 | Pablo Solares | Mexico | 1:49.24 | Q |
| 2 | 2 | Golden Coachman | United States | 1:49.25 | Q |
| 3 | 1 | Moise Joseph | Haiti | 1:50.42 | Q |
| 4 | 2 | Frank Bobadilla | Dominican Republic | 1:50.62 | Q |
| 5 | 1 | David Freeman | Puerto Rico | 1:50.73 | Q |
| 6 | 1 | Isaías Haro | Mexico | 1:50.91 | Q |
| 7 | 1 | Carlos Contrera | Dominican Republic | 1:50.95 | q |
| 8 | 2 | Evan Allen | Jamaica | 1:52.56 | q |
| 9 | 2 | Sherridan Kirk | Trinidad and Tobago | 1:53.99 | |
| 10 | 2 | Jenner Pelicó | Guatemala | 1:56.76 | |
| 11 | 1 | Francis Jiménez | El Salvador | 1:57.00 | |
| 12 | 1 | Raffique Providence | Saint Vincent and the Grenadines | 2:04.10 | |

Final

| Rank | Name | Nationality | Time | Notes |
|---|---|---|---|---|
| 1st place, gold medalist(s) | Golden Coachman | United States | 1:49.01 | |
| 2nd place, silver medalist(s) | Pablo Solares | Mexico | 1:49.28 | |
| 3rd place, bronze medalist(s) | Moise Joseph | Haiti | 1:50.25 | |
| 4 | Evan Allen | Jamaica | 1:50.56 | |
| 5 | Isaías Haro | Mexico | 1:51.40 | |
| 6 | Frank Bobadilla | Dominican Republic | 1:51.89 | |
| 7 | Carlos Contrera | Dominican Republic | 1:51.92 | |
| | David Freeman | Puerto Rico | DNF | |

=== 1500 meters ===
| Rank | Name | Nationality | Time | Notes |
|---|---|---|---|---|
| 1st place, gold medalist(s) | Pablo Solares | Mexico | 3:45.29 | |
| 2nd place, silver medalist(s) | Isaías Haro | Mexico | 3:48.53 | |
| 3rd place, bronze medalist(s) | Luis Soto | Puerto Rico | 3:49.69 | |
| 4 | Frank Bobadilla | Dominican Republic | 3:53.10 | |
| 5 | Golden Coachman | United States | 3:53.47 | |
| 6 | Francis Jiménez | El Salvador | 4:02.40 | |
| 7 | Juan Odalis Almonte | Dominican Republic | 4:03.30 | |
| 8 | David Freeman | Puerto Rico | 4:04.11 | |

=== 5000 meters ===
| Rank | Name | Nationality | Time | Notes |
|---|---|---|---|---|
| 1st place, gold medalist(s) | Benjamin Bruce | United States | 14:27.90 | |
| 2nd place, silver medalist(s) | Julio Pérez | Mexico | 14:29.45 | |
| 3rd place, bronze medalist(s) | José Amado García | Guatemala | 14:33.31 | |
| 4 | José Chávez | Costa Rica | 14:46.33 | |
| 5 | Denzil Ramirez | Trinidad and Tobago | 15:29.93 | |
| 6 | Wainard Talbert | Jamaica | 15:53.84 | |

=== 10,000 meters ===
| Rank | Name | Nationality | Time | Notes |
|---|---|---|---|---|
| 1st place, gold medalist(s) | Julio Pérez | Mexico | 29:38.31 | |
| 2nd place, silver medalist(s) | José Amado García | Guatemala | 29:42.11 | |

=== 110 meters hurdles ===
Heats
Wind:
Heat 1: +0.3 m/s, Heat 2: +1.5 m/s

| Rank | Heat | Name | Nationality | Time | Notes |
|---|---|---|---|---|---|
| 1 | 1 | Dexter Faulk | United States | 13.51 | Q |
| 2 | 2 | Linnie Yarbrough | United States | 13.74 | Q |
| 3 | 1 | Decosma Wright | Jamaica | 13.75 | Q |
| 4 | 1 | Enrique Llanos | Puerto Rico | 13.81 | Q |
| 5 | 2 | Héctor Cotto | Puerto Rico | 13.85 | Q |
| 6 | 2 | Stephen Jones | Barbados | 14.10 | Q |
| 7 | 2 | Ramón Sosa | Dominican Republic | 14.27 | q |
| 8 | 2 | Mikel Thomas | Trinidad and Tobago | 14.30 | q |
| 9 | 1 | Ronald Bennett | Honduras | 14.47 | |
| 10 | 1 | Alejandro Olmedo | El Salvador | 14.99 | |

Final
Wind:
-1.1 m/s

| Rank | Name | Nationality | Time | Notes |
|---|---|---|---|---|
| 1st place, gold medalist(s) | Dexter Faulk | United States | 13.35 | |
| 2nd place, silver medalist(s) | Decosma Wright | Jamaica | 13.67 | |
| 3rd place, bronze medalist(s) | Linnie Yarbrough | United States | 13.70 | |
| 4 | Héctor Cotto | Puerto Rico | 13.90 | |
| 5 | Enrique Llanos | Puerto Rico | 13.99 | |
| 6 | Stephen Jones | Barbados | 13.99 | |
| 7 | Ramón Sosa | Dominican Republic | 14.48 | |
| | Mikel Thomas | Trinidad and Tobago | DQ | |

=== 400 meters hurdles ===
Heats

| Rank | Heat | Name | Nationality | Time | Notes |
|---|---|---|---|---|---|
| 1 | 2 | Jonathan Williams | Belize | 49.74 | Q |
| 2 | 1 | LaRon Bennett | United States | 49.94 | Q |
| 3 | 2 | Reuben McCoy | United States | 50.08 | Q |
| 4 | 1 | Javier Culson | Puerto Rico | 50.85 | Q |
| 5 | 2 | Bryan Steele | Jamaica | 51.04 | Q |
| 6 | 1 | Allan Ayala | Guatemala | 52.48 | Q |
| 7 | 1 | Jonnie Lowe | Honduras | 52.57 | q |
| 8 | 2 | Camilo Quevedo | Guatemala | 52.73 | q |
| 9 | 2 | Argenis Bautista | Dominican Republic | 54.70 | |

Final

| Rank | Name | Nationality | Time | Notes |
|---|---|---|---|---|
| 1st place, gold medalist(s) | LaRon Bennett | United States | 48.76 | |
| 2nd place, silver medalist(s) | Jonathan Williams | Belize | 48.88 | |
| 3rd place, bronze medalist(s) | Javier Culson | Puerto Rico | 49.31 | |
| 4 | Bryan Steele | Jamaica | 49.48 | |
| 5 | Reuben McCoy | United States | 51.69 | |
| 6 | Camilo Quevedo | Guatemala | 52.14 | |
| 7 | Allan Ayala | Guatemala | 52.44 | |
| 8 | Jonnie Lowe | Honduras | 53.38 | |

=== 3000 meters steeplechase ===
| Rank | Name | Nationality | Time | Notes |
|---|---|---|---|---|
| 1st place, gold medalist(s) | Michael Spence | United States | 8:39.51 | |
| 2nd place, silver medalist(s) | Josefath González | Mexico | 8:43.08 | |
| 3rd place, bronze medalist(s) | Benjamin Bruce | United States | 8:56.09 | |
| 4 | Aaron Arias | Mexico | 9:04.42 | |
| 5 | José Chávez | Costa Rica | 9:21.56 | |

=== 4 x 100 meters relay ===
| Rank | Nation | Competitors | Time | Notes |
|---|---|---|---|---|
| 1st place, gold medalist(s) | United States | Abidemi Omole, Jordan Vaden, Michael Mitchell, Monzavous Edwards | 38.99 | |
| 2nd place, silver medalist(s) | Jamaica | Decosma Wright, Orlando Reid, Tristan Taylor, Carl Barret | 39.77 | |
| 3rd place, bronze medalist(s) | Trinidad and Tobago | Niconner Alexander, Richard Thompson, Rondel Sorrillo, Emmanuel Callander | 39.92 | |
| 4 | Cayman Islands | Kemar Hyman, Tyrell Cuffy, Stephon Johnson, Sean Troop | 40.01 | |
| 5 | Saint Kitts and Nevis | Triscan Hensley, Robert Morton, Antoine Adams, Delwayne Delaney | 40.37 | |
| 6 | Dominican Republic | Irving Guerrero, Joel Báez, Carlos García, Yoel Hernández | 40.50 | |
| 7 | United States Virgin Islands | Dimitrius Jefferson, Adrian Durant, Julio Felix, David Walters | 40.80 | |
| | Honduras | Jonnie Lowe, Rolando Palacios, Darvin Colón, Kessel Campbell | DNF | |
| | Netherlands Antilles | Prince Kwidama, Waldy Lindeborg, Brian Mariano, Charlton Rafaella | DQ | |

=== 4 x 400 meters relay ===
| Rank | Nation | Competitors | Time | Notes |
|---|---|---|---|---|
| 1st place, gold medalist(s) | United States | Reuben McCoy, Calvin Smith Jr., Michael Mitchell, David Neville | 3:02.78 | |
| 2nd place, silver medalist(s) | Jamaica | Dewayne Barret, Lansford Spence, Bryan Steele, Michael Manson | 3:04.32 | |
| 3rd place, bronze medalist(s) | Dominican Republic | Carlos Santa, Pedro Mejía, Yoel Tapia, Arismendy Peguero | 3:04.96 | |
| 4 | Puerto Rico | Héctor Carrasquillo, Javier Culson, Adalberto Amador, Félix Martínez | 3:06.06 | |
| 5 | Guatemala | Hans Villagrán, Camilo Quevedo, Edwin Baltazar, Allan Ayala | 3:16.83 | |
| 6 | El Salvador | César Cornejo, Néstor Meza, Francis Jiménez, Takeshi Fujiwara | 3:23.90 | |

=== 20,000 meters walk ===
| Rank | Name | Nationality | Time | Notes |
|---|---|---|---|---|
| 1st place, gold medalist(s) | Walter Sandoval | El Salvador | 1:28:29.00 | |
| 2nd place, silver medalist(s) | David Mejía | Mexico | 1:28:51.00 | |
| 3rd place, bronze medalist(s) | Allan Segura | Costa Rica | 1:29:50.00 | |
| 4 | Bernardo Calvo | Costa Rica | 1:29:56.00 | |
| 5 | Víctor Mendoza | El Salvador | 1:33:22.00 | |
| | Adrián Herrera | Mexico | DQ | |

=== High jump ===
| Rank | Athlete | Nationality | 1.90 | 1.95 | 2.00 | 2.05 | 2.08 | 2.11 | 2.14 | 2.17 | 2.19 | 2.21 | 2.23 | 2.25 | Result | Notes |
|---|---|---|---|---|---|---|---|---|---|---|---|---|---|---|---|---|
| 1st place, gold medalist(s) | Adam Shunk | United States | – | – | – | – | o | – | o | – | o | xo | o | xxx | 2.23 | |
| 2nd place, silver medalist(s) | Gerardo Martínez | Mexico | – | – | o | o | – | o | o | xxo | xxo | o | xxx | | 2.21 | |
| 3rd place, bronze medalist(s) | Julio Luciano | Dominican Republic | – | – | – | – | – | o | xxo | o | xxx | | | | 2.17 | |
| 4 | Darvin Edwards | Saint Lucia | – | – | o | o | o | xo | xo | xxx | | | | | 2.14 | |
| 5 | Deon Brangman | Bermuda | – | – | o | o | – | o | xxx | | | | | | 2.11 | |
| 6 | Brendan Williams | Dominica | – | – | o | o | – | xxx | | | | | | | 2.05 | |
| 6 | Henderson Dottin | Barbados | – | – | – | o | xxx | | | | | | | | 2.05 | |
| 8 | Jorge Rouco | Mexico | – | – | o | xxo | xxx | | | | | | | | 2.05 | |
| 9 | Kevin Huggins | Trinidad and Tobago | – | – | xo | xxx | | | | | | | | | 2.00 | |
| 10 | Alejandro Olmedo | El Salvador | xxo | xo | xxx | | | | | | | | | | 1.95 | |
| | Omar Wright | Cayman Islands | – | xxx | | | | | | | | | | | NM | |
| | Henry Linton | Costa Rica | xxx | | | | | | | | | | | | NM | |
| | Adolphus Jones | Saint Kitts and Nevis | | | | | | | | | | | | | DNS | |

=== Pole vault ===
| Rank | Athlete | Nationality | 4.35 | 4.50 | 4.65 | 4.80 | 4.95 | 5.05 | 5.15 | 5.20 | Result | Notes |
|---|---|---|---|---|---|---|---|---|---|---|---|---|
| 1st place, gold medalist(s) | José Francisco Montano | Mexico | – | – | – | o | xo | xxo | xxo | xxx | 5.15 | |
| 2nd place, silver medalist(s) | Christian Sánchez | Mexico | – | – | – | xo | – | xxx | | | 4.80 | |
| 3rd place, bronze medalist(s) | Jeremy Scott | United States | xo | – | o | xo | xxx | | | | 4.80 | |

=== Long jump ===
| Rank | Athlete | Nationality | #1 | #2 | #3 | #4 | #5 | #6 | Result | Notes |
|---|---|---|---|---|---|---|---|---|---|---|
| 1st place, gold medalist(s) | Carlos Jorge | Dominican Republic | 7.56 | 7.89 | 7.68 | x | 7.63 | 7.86 | 7.89 | |
| 2nd place, silver medalist(s) | Tyrone Harris | United States | x | 7.61 | x | 7.75w | 7.83 | 7.77 | 7.83 | |
| 3rd place, bronze medalist(s) | LeJuan Simon | Trinidad and Tobago | 7.50 | x | x | 7.71 | x | x | 7.71 | |
| 4 | Stephon Johnson | Cayman Islands | 7.20 | 7.50 | x | 6.93 | 7.63 | x | 7.63 | |
| 5 | Allen Simms | Puerto Rico | 7.58w | x | x | x | x | x | 7.58w | |
| 6 | Luis Rivera | Mexico | 6.51 | 7.20 | 6.96 | 7.27 | 7.43 | 7.35 | 7.43 | |
| 7 | Tyrone Smith | Bermuda | 7.34 | 7.28 | 7.38 | 7.36 | x | x | 7.38 | |
| 8 | Vicente Ríos | Mexico | x | 7.11w | 7.00 | 7.00 | x | 6.79 | 7.11w | |
| 9 | Kessel Campbell | Honduras | x | x | 6.80 | | | | 6.80 | |
| 10 | Juan Carlos Nájera | Guatemala | 6.56 | x | 6.75 | | | | 6.75 | |
| | Keita Cline | British Virgin Islands | | | | | | | DNS | |
| | Joel Wade | Belize | | | | | | | DNS | |

=== Triple jump ===
| Rank | Athlete | Nationality | #1 | #2 | #3 | #4 | #5 | #6 | Result | Notes |
|---|---|---|---|---|---|---|---|---|---|---|
| 1st place, gold medalist(s) | Marc Kellman | United States | x | 16.02 | x | x | 16.50 | x | 16.50 | |
| 2nd place, silver medalist(s) | Allen Simms | Puerto Rico | x | x | 16.23 | 15.17 | 16.37 | 16.25 | 16.37 | |
| 3rd place, bronze medalist(s) | LeJuan Simon | Trinidad and Tobago | 15.72 | 15.50 | – | – | – | – | 15.72 | |
| 4 | Juan Carlos Nájera | Guatemala | 14.99 | 14.67 | x | 15.37 | 15.58 | 15.48 | 15.58 | |
| 5 | Keita Cline | British Virgin Islands | x | x | x | 14.36 | x | x | 14.36 | |

=== Shot put ===
| Rank | Athlete | Nationality | #1 | #2 | #3 | #4 | #5 | #6 | Result | Notes |
|---|---|---|---|---|---|---|---|---|---|---|
| 1st place, gold medalist(s) | Rhuben Williams | United States | 17.71 | 17.80 | 17.34 | 18.32 | 18.43 | 18.04 | 18.43 | |
| 2nd place, silver medalist(s) | Tyron Benjamin | Dominica | 16.81 | 16.32 | 16.69 | 16.11 | x | x | 16.81 | |
| 3rd place, bronze medalist(s) | Jorge Castro | Guatemala | 12.58 | 13.35 | 13.15 | 13.91 | 13.86 | x | 13.91 | |

=== Discus throw ===
| Rank | Athlete | Nationality | #1 | #2 | #3 | #4 | #5 | #6 | Result | Notes |
|---|---|---|---|---|---|---|---|---|---|---|
| 1st place, gold medalist(s) | Nick Petrucci | United States | 55.36 | 53.75 | 54.78 | 55.48 | 54.21 | 56.17 | 56.17 | |
| 2nd place, silver medalist(s) | Adonson Shallow | Saint Vincent and the Grenadines | x | 51.43 | x | x | 50.38 | 52.39 | 52.39 | |
| 3rd place, bronze medalist(s) | Jesús Sánchez | Mexico | 50.15 | 49.06 | 46.78 | 47.35 | 49.79 | 49.26 | 50.15 | |
| 4 | Kyle Francis | British Virgin Islands | 40.40 | 44.32 | 42.12 | 31.59 | x | x | 44.32 | |
| 5 | Michael Letterlough | Cayman Islands | 42.58 | 43.32 | 41.82 | 42.75 | 44.08 | x | 44.08 | |
| 6 | Juan Galdámez | El Salvador | 41.82 | 41.15 | 41.30 | 41.74 | x | 40.78 | 41.82 | |

=== Hammer throw ===
| Rank | Athlete | Nationality | #1 | #2 | #3 | #4 | #5 | #6 | Result | Notes |
|---|---|---|---|---|---|---|---|---|---|---|
| 1st place, gold medalist(s) | Jake Freeman | United States | 70.32 | x | 67.37 | 69.67 | x | x | 70.32 | |
| 2nd place, silver medalist(s) | Luis Saavedra | Mexico | x | 61.06 | x | 62.62 | 61.89 | 59.18 | 62.62 | |
| 3rd place, bronze medalist(s) | Roberto Sawyers | Costa Rica | 61.98 | 61.36 | 60.29 | x | x | 58.00 | 61.98 | |
| 4 | Michael Letterlough | Cayman Islands | 53.50 | x | 57.39 | 55.43 | x | 55.96 | 57.39 | |
| 5 | Evangelisto Fermin | Dominican Republic | 55.42 | x | x | x | x | x | 55.42 | |
| | Santiago Loera | Mexico | | | | | | | DNS | |

=== Javelin throw ===
| Rank | Athlete | Nationality | #1 | #2 | #3 | #4 | #5 | #6 | Result | Notes |
|---|---|---|---|---|---|---|---|---|---|---|
| 1st place, gold medalist(s) | Justin St. Clair | United States | 72.33 | 70.58 | 73.16 | 70.73 | 71.44 | x | 73.16 | |
| 2nd place, silver medalist(s) | Darwin García | Dominican Republic | 69.64 | 68.32 | 61.47 | 66.17 | x | x | 69.64 | |
| 3rd place, bronze medalist(s) | Rigoberto Calderón | Nicaragua | x | 59.78 | x | 66.50 | 62.18 | x | 66.50 | |

=== Decathlon ===
The highest mark recorded in each event is highlighted in yellow

| Rank | Athlete | Nationality | 100m | LJ | SP | HJ | 400m | 110m H | DT | PV | JT | 1500m | Points | Notes |
|---|---|---|---|---|---|---|---|---|---|---|---|---|---|---|
| 1st place, gold medalist(s) | Darvin Colón | Honduras | 11.23w | 6.41 | 12.46 | 1.81 | 52.91 | 15.23 | 41.18 | 3.20 | 45.40 | 5:20.03 | 6330 | |
| 2nd place, silver medalist(s) | Adolphus Jones | Saint Kitts and Nevis | 11.40w | 6.83 | 11.39 | 2.05 | 50.04 | 21.88 | 34.56 | 3.25 | 40.18 | 4:40.42 | 6092 | |

== Women's results ==
=== 100 meters ===
Heats
Wind:
Heat 1: -1.2 m/s, Heat 2: +0.8 m/s, Heat 3: +0.9 m/s

| Rank | Heat | Name | Nationality | Time | Notes |
|---|---|---|---|---|---|
| 1 | 3 | Mechelle Lewis | United States | 11.32 | Q |
| 2 | 3 | Virgil Hodge | Saint Kitts and Nevis | 11.40 | Q |
| 3 | 1 | Peta-Gaye Dowdie | Jamaica | 11.41 | Q |
| 4 | 1 | Alexis Weatherspoon | United States | 11.44 | Q |
| 5 | 3 | Carol Rodríguez | Puerto Rico | 11.45 | q |
| 6 | 3 | Sasha Springer | Trinidad and Tobago | 11.47 | q |
| 7 | 3 | Nolle Graham | Jamaica | 11.63 | |
| 8 | 2 | Marleny Mejía | Dominican Republic | 11.77 | Q |
| 9 | 2 | Ayanna Hutchinson | Trinidad and Tobago | 11.81 | Q |
| 10 | 2 | Valma Bass | United States Virgin Islands | 11.94 | |
| 11 | 3 | María Carmona | Dominican Republic | 11.98 | |
| 12 | 1 | Celiangeli Morales | Puerto Rico | 12.02 | |
| 13 | 2 | Mariela Leal | Costa Rica | 12.24 | |
| 14 | 1 | Natalia Santamaría | El Salvador | 13.31 | |
| 15 | 2 | Consuelo Vasquez | El Salvador | 13.91 | |

Final
Wind:
-0.3 m/s

| Rank | Name | Nationality | Time | Notes |
|---|---|---|---|---|
| 1st place, gold medalist(s) | Mechelle Lewis | United States | 11.37 | |
| 2nd place, silver medalist(s) | Alexis Weatherspoon | United States | 11.43 | |
| 3rd place, bronze medalist(s) | Carol Rodríguez | Puerto Rico | 11.47 | |
| 4 | Peta-Gaye Dowdie | Jamaica | 11.53 | |
| 5 | Sasha Springer | Trinidad and Tobago | 11.55 | |
| 6 | Virgil Hodge | Saint Kitts and Nevis | 11.63 | |
| 7 | Ayanna Hutchinson | Trinidad and Tobago | 11.88 | |
| 8 | Marleny Mejía | Dominican Republic | 11.95 | |

=== 200 meters ===
Heats
Wind:
Heat 1: +2.5 m/s, Heat 2: +2.7 m/s

| Rank | Heat | Name | Nationality | Time | Notes |
|---|---|---|---|---|---|
| 1 | 2 | Virgil Hodge | Saint Kitts and Nevis | 22.92 | Q |
| 2 | 2 | Latonia Wilson | United States | 23.07 | Q |
| 3 | 1 | Shareese Woods | United States | 23.10 | Q |
| 4 | 1 | Carol Rodríguez | Puerto Rico | 23.31 | Q |
| 5 | 1 | Anneisha McLaughlin | Jamaica | 23.38 | Q |
| 6 | 2 | Nadine Palmer | Jamaica | 23.55 | Q |
| 7 | 1 | Marleny Mejía | Dominican Republic | 23.84 | q |
| 8 | 1 | Nandelle Cameron | Trinidad and Tobago | 23.95 | q |
| 9 | 2 | Reyare Thomas | Trinidad and Tobago | 24.21 | |
| 10 | 2 | Valma Bass | United States Virgin Islands | 24.28 | |
| 11 | 1 | Tracy Joseph | Costa Rica | 24.79 | |
| 12 | 2 | Kaina Martinez | Belize | 25.90 | |

Final
Wind:
+2.2 m/s

| Rank | Name | Nationality | Time | Notes |
|---|---|---|---|---|
| 1st place, gold medalist(s) | Virgil Hodge | Saint Kitts and Nevis | 22.73 | |
| 2nd place, silver medalist(s) | Shareese Woods | United States | 22.97 | |
| 3rd place, bronze medalist(s) | Latonia Wilson | United States | 23.14 | |
| 4 | Nadine Palmer | Jamaica | 23.22 | |
| 5 | Anneisha McLaughlin | Jamaica | 23.27 | |
| 6 | Nandelle Cameron | Trinidad and Tobago | 23.69 | |
| 7 | Marleny Mejía | Dominican Republic | 23.82 | |
| | Carol Rodríguez | Puerto Rico | DNS | |

=== 400 meters ===
Heats

| Rank | Heat | Name | Nationality | Time | Notes |
|---|---|---|---|---|---|
| 1 | 1 | Debbie Dunn | United States | 52.23 | Q |
| 2 | 1 | Kineke Alexander | Saint Vincent and the Grenadines | 52.56 | Q |
| 3 | 2 | Clora Williams | Jamaica | 52.69 | Q |
| 4 | 2 | Nathandra John | Saint Kitts and Nevis | 53.02 | Q |
| 5 | 1 | Ronetta Smith | Jamaica | 53.31 | Q |
| 6 | 2 | Angel Perkins | United States | 53.32 | Q |
| 7 | 2 | Mayra González | Mexico | 55.50 | q |
| 8 | 1 | Yolanda Osana | Dominican Republic | 55.86 | q |
| 9 | 2 | Verónica Quijano | El Salvador | 58.05 | |
| 10 | 1 | Dominique Maloney | British Virgin Islands | 58.68 | |

Final

| Rank | Name | Nationality | Time | Notes |
|---|---|---|---|---|
| 1st place, gold medalist(s) | Debbie Dunn | United States | 52.68 | |
| 2nd place, silver medalist(s) | Clora Williams | Jamaica | 53.27 | |
| 3rd place, bronze medalist(s) | Kineke Alexander | Saint Vincent and the Grenadines | 53.52 | |
| 4 | Nathandra John | Saint Kitts and Nevis | 54.01 | |
| 5 | Angel Perkins | United States | 54.02 | |
| 6 | Mayra González | Mexico | 56.89 | |
| | Ronetta Smith | Jamaica | DNF | |
| | Yolanda Osana | Dominican Republic | DQ | FS |

=== 800 meters ===
| Rank | Name | Nationality | Time | Notes |
|---|---|---|---|---|
| 1st place, gold medalist(s) | Mary Jayne Harrelson | United States | 2:05.10 | |
| 2nd place, silver medalist(s) | Lyzaira del Valle | Puerto Rico | 2:05.73 | |
| 3rd place, bronze medalist(s) | Sheena Goodings | Barbados | 2:06.01 | |
| 4 | Geena Gall | United States | 2:06.64 | |
| 5 | Melissa de Leon | Trinidad and Tobago | 2:08.07 | |
| 6 | Yamilé Alaluf | Mexico | 2:08.77 | |
| 7 | Lorraine McKenzie | Jamaica | 2:14.58 | |
| 8 | Josselin Escobar | El Salvador | 2:17.21 | |
| 9 | Sonny García | Dominican Republic | 2:17.48 | |
| 10 | Wendy Zúñiga | Costa Rica | 2:17.54 | |

=== 1500 meters ===
| Rank | Name | Nationality | Time | Notes |
|---|---|---|---|---|
| 1st place, gold medalist(s) | Mary Jayne Harrelson | United States | 4:30.09 | |
| 2nd place, silver medalist(s) | Yamilé Alaluf | Mexico | 4:37.64 | |
| 3rd place, bronze medalist(s) | Sonny García | Dominican Republic | 4:49.62 | |

=== 5000 meters ===
| Rank | Name | Nationality | Time | Notes |
|---|---|---|---|---|
| 1st place, gold medalist(s) | Whitney McDonald | United States | 16:42.12 | |
| 2nd place, silver medalist(s) | Marisol Romero | Mexico | 17:00.47 | |
| 3rd place, bronze medalist(s) | Elsa Monterroso | Guatemala | 17:59.85 | |

=== 110 meters hurdles ===
Heats
Wind:
Heat 1: +0.4 m/s, Heat 2: +1.8 m/s

| Rank | Heat | Name | Nationality | Time | Notes |
|---|---|---|---|---|---|
| 1 | 1 | Candice Davis | United States | 13.09 | Q |
| 2 | 2 | Tiffany Ofili | United States | 13.24 | Q |
| 3 | 1 | Monique Morgan | Jamaica | 13.33 | Q |
| 4 | 2 | Nancy Searcy | Puerto Rico | 13.56 | Q |
| 5 | 1 | Nadine Faustine | Haiti | 13.75 | Q |
| 6 | 2 | Violeta Avila | Mexico | 14.01 | Q |
| 7 | 1 | Yaritza Rivera | Puerto Rico | 14.09 | q |
| 8 | 2 | Jeimy Bernárdez | Honduras | 14.15 | q |
| 9 | 2 | Janelle Brathwaite | Barbados | 14.15 | |
| 10 | 2 | Sharolyn Scott | Costa Rica | 14.57 | |
| 11 | 1 | Leniece Lewis | British Virgin Islands | 14.90 | |

Final
Wind:
+0.2 m/s

| Rank | Name | Nationality | Time | Notes |
|---|---|---|---|---|
| 1st place, gold medalist(s) | Candice Davis | United States | 13.12 | |
| 2nd place, silver medalist(s) | Tiffany Ofili | United States | 13.27 | |
| 3rd place, bronze medalist(s) | Monique Morgan | Jamaica | 13.39 | |
| 4 | Nadine Faustine | Haiti | 13.42 | |
| 5 | Jeimy Bernárdez | Honduras | 13.96 | |
| 6 | Yaritza Rivera | Puerto Rico | 14.09 | |
| 7 | Nancy Searcy | Puerto Rico | 14.10 | |
| 8 | Violeta Avila | Mexico | 14.23 | |

=== 400 meters hurdles ===
| Rank | Name | Nationality | Time | Notes |
|---|---|---|---|---|
| 1st place, gold medalist(s) | Latosha Wallace | United States | 56.54 | |
| 2nd place, silver medalist(s) | Carlene Robinson | Jamaica | 57.25 | |
| 3rd place, bronze medalist(s) | Sherlenia Green | United States | 58.26 | |
| 4 | Yolanda Osana | Dominican Republic | 59.21 | |
| 5 | Venecia Senyois | Dominican Republic | 1:00.87 | |
| 6 | Verónica Quijano | El Salvador | 1:01.41 | |
| 7 | Ana María Porras | Costa Rica | 1:05.58 | |

=== 3000 meters steeplechase ===
| Rank | Name | Nationality | Time | Notes |
|---|---|---|---|---|
| 1st place, gold medalist(s) | Kristin Anderson | United States | 10:21.82 | |
| 2nd place, silver medalist(s) | Sandra López | Mexico | 11:04.79 | |
| 3rd place, bronze medalist(s) | Gabriela Traña | Costa Rica | 11:11.17 | |
| 4 | Sonny García | Dominican Republic | 11:32.53 | |
| 5 | Blanca Solis | El Salvador | 11:48.98 | |

=== 4 x 100 meters relay ===
| Rank | Nation | Competitors | Time | Notes |
|---|---|---|---|---|
| 1st place, gold medalist(s) | Jamaica | Nadine Palmer, Rose Whyte, Anneisha McLaughlin, Peta-Gaye Dowdie | 43.73 | |
| 2nd place, silver medalist(s) | United States | Shameka Marshall, Alexis Weatherspoon, Candice Davis, Mechelle Lewis | 43.91 | |
| 3rd place, bronze medalist(s) | Trinidad and Tobago | Ayanna Hutchinson, Sasha Springer, Nandelle Cameron, Fana Ashby | 43.98 | |
| 4 | Puerto Rico | Beatriz Cruz, Celiangeli Morales, Jennifer Gutiérrez, Irelys Burgos | 45.08 | |
| 5 | Saint Kitts and Nevis | Natandra John, Tanika Liburd, Desarie Walwyn, Virgil Hodge | 45.15 | |
| 6 | Dominican Republic | Nelsy Delgado, Marleny Mejía, María Carmona, Santa Solis | 45.30 | |
| 7 | Costa Rica | Mariela Leal, Sharolyn Scott, Cindy Sibaja, Tracy Joseph | 48.65 | |
| 8 | El Salvador | Gladys Quijada, Verónica Quijano, Amada Martínez, Natalia Santamaría | 49.82 | |

=== 4 x 400 meters relay ===
| Rank | Nation | Competitors | Time | Notes |
|---|---|---|---|---|
| 1st place, gold medalist(s) | United States | Latosha Wallace, Shareese Woods, Latonia Wilson, Debbie Dunn | 3:29.15 | |
| 2nd place, silver medalist(s) | Jamaica | Ronetta Smith, Carlene Robinson, Rose Whyte, Clora Williams | 3:30.16 | |
| 3rd place, bronze medalist(s) | El Salvador | Verónica Quijano, Josselin Escobar, Natalia Santamaría, Jessica Bautista | 4:01.50 | |
| | Dominican Republic | Marleny Mejía, Venecia Senyois, Nelsy Delgado, Yolanda Osana | DQ | |

=== 10,000 meters walk ===
| Rank | Name | Nationality | Time | Notes |
|---|---|---|---|---|
| 1st place, gold medalist(s) | Cristina López | El Salvador | 44:16.21 | |
| 2nd place, silver medalist(s) | Verónica Colindres | El Salvador | 47:39.93 | |
| 3rd place, bronze medalist(s) | Evelyn Núñez | Guatemala | 47:40.36 | |
| 4 | Abigail Sáenz | Mexico | 49:39.01 | |
| 5 | Samantha Cohen | United States | 49:52.24 | |
| 6 | Rocío Alcántara | Mexico | 51:59.47 | |
| 7 | Maria Michta | United States | 59:00.37 | |

=== High jump ===
| Rank | Athlete | Nationality | 1.60 | 1.65 | 1.70 | 1.75 | 1.78 | 1.81 | 1.84 | 1.87 | 1.89 | Result | Notes |
|---|---|---|---|---|---|---|---|---|---|---|---|---|---|
| 1st place, gold medalist(s) | Levern Spencer | Saint Lucia | – | – | – | – | o | – | xxo | xxo | xo | 1.89 | |
| 2nd place, silver medalist(s) | Romary Rifka | Mexico | – | – | – | o | o | o | o | o | xxx | 1.87 | |
| 3rd place, bronze medalist(s) | Juana Arrendel | Dominican Republic | – | – | o | o | o | o | o | xo | xxx | 1.87 | |
| 4 | Fabiola Ayala | Mexico | – | – | o | o | o | xxo | xxx | | | 1.81 | |
| 5 | Sharon Day | United States | – | – | o | o | – | xxx | | | | 1.75 | |
| 6 | Kay-De Vaughn | Belize | xo | xxo | xxx | | | | | | | 1.65 | |
| | Ana María Porras | Costa Rica | xxx | | | | | | | | | NM | |
| | Yaritza Rivera | Puerto Rico | | | | | | | | | | DNS | |

=== Pole vault ===
| Rank | Athlete | Nationality | 3.40 | 3.50 | 3.60 | 3.70 | 4.00 | 4.15 | 4.35 | Result | Notes |
|---|---|---|---|---|---|---|---|---|---|---|---|
| 1st place, gold medalist(s) | Becky Holliday | United States | – | – | – | – | o | xo | xxx | 4.15 | |
| 2nd place, silver medalist(s) | Cecilia Villar | Mexico | xxo | o | o | xxx | | | | 3.60 | |
| 3rd place, bronze medalist(s) | Gladys Quijada | El Salvador | – | xo | xxx | | | | | 3.50 | |

=== Long jump ===
| Rank | Athlete | Nationality | #1 | #2 | #3 | #4 | #5 | #6 | Result | Notes |
|---|---|---|---|---|---|---|---|---|---|---|
| 1st place, gold medalist(s) | Shameka Marshall | United States | 5.95 | 6.34 | 6.18 | 6.08 | x | 6.20 | 6.34 | |
| 2nd place, silver medalist(s) | Nolle Graham | Jamaica | x | x | 6.26 | 4.04 | 6.10 | 6.250 | 6.26 | |
| 3rd place, bronze medalist(s) | Tanika Liburd | Saint Kitts and Nevis | 5.88 | 6.12 | x | x | x | 5.76 | 6.12 | |
| 4 | Amy Seward | Puerto Rico | 5.99 | 5.97 | 6.03 | 6.06 | x | x | 6.06 | |
| 5 | Tricia Flores | Belize | 5.79 | 5.96 | 5.88 | 5.89 | 5.80 | 5.57 | 5.96 | |
| 6 | Claudett Martínez | Mexico | 5.45 | x | 5.78 | 5.92 | 5.86 | x | 5.92 | |
| 7 | Silvienne Krosendyk | Aruba | 5.45 | 5.80 | 5.82 | 5.45 | 5.53 | 5.50 | 5.82 | |
| 8 | Yaritza Rivera | Puerto Rico | 5.29 | x | x | 4.98 | – | – | 5.29 | |

=== Triple jump ===
| Rank | Athlete | Nationality | #1 | #2 | #3 | #4 | #5 | #6 | Result | Notes |
|---|---|---|---|---|---|---|---|---|---|---|
| 1st place, gold medalist(s) | Ayanna Alexander | Trinidad and Tobago | 13.12w | 13.05 | x | 13.13w | 13.03 | 13.29w | 13.29w | |
| 2nd place, silver medalist(s) | Tiombe Hurd | United States | x | 13.05 | 13.22 | x | x | x | 13.22 | |
| 3rd place, bronze medalist(s) | Amy Seward | Puerto Rico | 12.93 | 12.58w | 12.64w | 12.61w | 12.54 | x | 12.93 | |
| 4 | Kay-De Vaughn | Belize | x | 11.78 | 11.73 | x | – | 11.76 | 11.78 | |
| | Cindy Sibaja | Costa Rica | x | x | x | x | x | x | NM | |

=== Shot put ===
| Rank | Athlete | Nationality | #1 | #2 | #3 | #4 | #5 | #6 | Result | Notes |
|---|---|---|---|---|---|---|---|---|---|---|
| 1st place, gold medalist(s) | Cleopatra Borel-Brown | Trinidad and Tobago | 16.80 | 17.53 | x | 17.32 | x | x | 17.53 | |
| 2nd place, silver medalist(s) | Annie Alexander | Trinidad and Tobago | 15.73 | 15.08 | 13.36 | 15.89 | 13.89 | 14.25 | 15.89 | |
| 3rd place, bronze medalist(s) | Shernelle Nicholls | Barbados | 15.82 | 14.71 | 15.57 | 15.08 | 15.67 | 15.69 | 15.82 | |
| 4 | Margarita Bernardo | Dominican Republic | x | 15.72 | 14.55 | x | 13.47 | 14.56 | 15.72 | |
| 5 | Keisha Walkes | Barbados | 13.56 | 14.60 | 15.09 | 15.08 | 14.30 | 14.29 | 15.09 | |
| 6 | Tamara Lechuga | Mexico | 13.09 | 13.63 | x | 13.40 | 13.39 | 13.02 | 13.63 | |
| 7 | Dorothy López | Guatemala | 12.84 | 12.78 | 11.99 | 11.52 | 11.86 | 12.03 | 12.84 | |
| 8 | Kandice Vaughn | Belize | 10.00 | 10.23 | 10.66 | 10.52 | 10.12 | 9.68 | 10.66 | |

=== Discus throw ===
| Rank | Athlete | Nationality | #1 | #2 | #3 | #4 | #5 | #6 | Result | Notes |
|---|---|---|---|---|---|---|---|---|---|---|
| 1st place, gold medalist(s) | Stephanie Trafton | United States | 54.80 | 57.77 | 55.49 | 56.46 | 55.67 | 59.27 | 59.27 | |
| 2nd place, silver medalist(s) | Annie Alexander | Trinidad and Tobago | 49.46 | 51.25 | 46.81 | x | 48.04 | 53.63 | 53.63 | |
| 3rd place, bronze medalist(s) | Shernelle Nicholls | Barbados | 48.44 | 50.56 | 42.84 | 51.15 | 49.14 | 47.84 | 51.15 | |
| 4 | Keisha Walkes | Barbados | 45.63 | 47.40 | 50.28 | 49.71 | 48.90 | 48.93 | 50.28 | |
| 5 | Mary Mercedes | Dominican Republic | 44.91 | x | x | x | 49.13 | x | 49.13 | |
| 6 | Iraís Estrada | Mexico | 42.81 | 44.90 | x | x | 47.19 | 47.05 | 47.19 | |
| 7 | Dorothy López | Guatemala | 38.26 | 37.17 | 36.76 | 36.66 | 39.52 | 37.97 | 39.52 | |
| | Kandice Vaughn | Belize | | | | | | | DNS | |

=== Hammer throw ===
| Rank | Athlete | Nationality | #1 | #2 | #3 | #4 | #5 | #6 | Result | Notes |
|---|---|---|---|---|---|---|---|---|---|---|
| 1st place, gold medalist(s) | Jessica Cosby | United States | 65.15 | 59.19 | 64.98 | 63.52 | x | 62.60 | 65.15 | |
| 2nd place, silver medalist(s) | Candice Scott | United States | 57.50 | 58.95 | 64.98 | 63.52 | x | x | 60.52 | |
| 3rd place, bronze medalist(s) | Jéssica Ponce | Mexico | x | 58.95 | x | x | x | x | 58.95 | |
| 4 | Amarilys Alméstica | Puerto Rico | x | 54.80 | x | x | x | 57.40 | 57.40 | |
| 5 | Caltha Seymour | Jamaica | 52.08 | 54.20 | x | x | 49.72 | 54.69 | 54.69 | |

=== Javelin throw ===
| Rank | Athlete | Nationality | #1 | #2 | #3 | #4 | #5 | #6 | Result | Notes |
|---|---|---|---|---|---|---|---|---|---|---|
| 1st place, gold medalist(s) | Ana Gutiérrez | Mexico | 47.65 | 49.87 | 51.52 | 48.98 | 49.82 | 51.02 | 51.52 | |
| 2nd place, silver medalist(s) | Anna Raynor | United States | x | 47.48 | 47.01 | 49.21 | 50.15 | 50.86 | 50.86 | |
| 3rd place, bronze medalist(s) | Erma-Gene Evans | Saint Lucia | 41.46 | 47.36 | x | 39.04 | 44.96 | 47.95 | 47.95 | |
| 4 | Ginna von Quednow | Guatemala | 35.53 | 40.18 | x | 39.32 | 36.02 | 38.37 | 40.18 | |

=== Heptathlon ===
The highest mark recorded in each event is highlighted in yellow

| Rank | Athlete | Nationality | 100m H | HJ | SP | 200m | LJ | JT | 800m | Points | Notes |
|---|---|---|---|---|---|---|---|---|---|---|---|
| 1st place, gold medalist(s) | Gabriela Carrillo | El Salvador | 14.90 | 1.71 | 9.82 | 27.06 | 5.66 | 37.86 | 2:29.29 | 5022 | |
| 2nd place, silver medalist(s) | Mariana Abuela | Mexico | 15.00 | 1.62 | 9.40 | 26.37 | 5.12 | 38.22 | 2:26.08 | 4824 | |
| 3rd place, bronze medalist(s) | Natoya Baird | Trinidad and Tobago | 14.51 | 1.65 | 9.09 | 26.11 | 5.11 | 32.76 | 2:43.57 | 4611 | |
| 4 | Ginna von Quednow | Guatemala | 16.51 | 1.42 | 8.78 | 27.00 | 5.20 | 41.84 | 2:42.58 | 4210 | |
