= Athletics at the 2007 Pan American Games – Women's 4 × 100 metres relay =

Women's 4 × 100 metres relay at the Pan American Games

The women's 4 × 100 metres relay at the 2007 Pan American Games was held on July 27–28.

== Medalists ==
Gold	Silver	Bronze
Jamaica; Sheri-Ann Brooks; Tracy-Ann Rowe; Aleen Bailey; Peta-Gaye Dowdie; Nadine Palmer*; Elva Goulbourne*	United States; Shareese Woods; Mechelle Lewis; Alexis Weatherspoon; Mikele Barber	Cuba; Virgen Benavides; Roxana Díaz; Misleidys Lazo; Anay Tejeda; Yenima Arencibia*

== Results ==
=== Heats ===
Qualification: First 3 teams of each heat (Q) plus the next 2 fastest (q) qualified for the final.

Rank	Heat	Nation	Athletes	Time	Notes
1	1	United States	Shareese Woods, Mechelle Lewis, Alexis Weatherspoon, Mikele Barber	43.07	Q
2	1	Cuba	Virgen Benavides, Yenima Arencibia, Misleidys Lazo, Anay Tejeda	43.46	Q
3	2	Brazil	Thatiana Regina Ignácio, Lucimar de Moura, Thaissa Presti, Luciana dos Santos	43.98	Q
4	1	Puerto Rico	Beatriz Cruz, Celiangeli Morales, Jennifer Gutiérrez, Carol Rodríguez	44.05	Q, NR
5	2	Saint Kitts and Nevis	Tanika Liburd, Desarie Walwyn, Tameka Williams, Virgil Hodge	44.11	Q, NR
6	2	Jamaica	Tracy-Ann Rowe, Nadine Palmer, Peta-Gaye Dowdie, Elva Goulbourne	44.12	Q
7	1	Trinidad and Tobago	Ayanna Hutchinson, Sasha Springer-Jones, Nandelle Cameron, Fana Ashby	44.16	q
8	2	Colombia	Briggite Merlano, Felipa Palacios, Mirtha Brock, Darlenys Obregón	44.53	q
9	1	Bahamas	Shaniqua Ferguson, Tivanna Thompson, Tamica Clarke, Shandria Brown	45.13	
10	2	Chile	María Carolina Díaz, María Mackenna, Daniela Ri de Relli, Daniela Pavez	45.50	
11	1	Ecuador	Lorena Mina, Yessica Perea, Paola Sánchez, Erika Chávez	46.55	

=== Final ===
Rank	Lane	Nation	Athletes	Time	Notes
1st place, gold medalist(s)	7	Jamaica	Sheri-Ann Brooks, Tracy-Ann Rowe, Aleen Bailey, Peta-Gaye Dowdie	43.58	
2nd place, silver medalist(s)	4	United States	Shareese Woods, Mechelle Lewis, Alexis Weatherspoon, Mikele Barber	43.62	
3rd place, bronze medalist(s)	3	Cuba	Virgen Benavides, Roxana Díaz, Misleidys Lazo, Anay Tejeda	43.80	
4	2	Puerto Rico	Beatriz Cruz, Celiangeli Morales, Jennifer Gutiérrez, Carol Rodríguez	43.81	NR
5	6	Saint Kitts and Nevis	Tanika Liburd, Desarie Walwyn, Tameka Williams, Virgil Hodge	44.14	
6	5	Brazil	Thatiana Regina Ignácio, Lucimar de Moura, Thaissa Presti, Luciana dos Santos	44.14	
7	8	Trinidad and Tobago	Ayanna Hutchinson, Sasha Springer-Jones, Nandelle Cameron, Fana Ashby	44.33	
	1	Colombia		DNS	
