= Athletics at the 2007 Pan American Games – Women's 100 metres =

Women's 100 metres at the Pan American Games

The women's 100 metres event at the 2007 Pan American Games was held on July 23–24.

== Medalists ==
Gold	Silver	Bronze
Mikele Barber; United States	Mechelle Lewis; United States	Chandra Sturrup; Bahamas

== Results ==
=== Heats ===
Qualification: First 3 of each heat (Q) and the next 4 fastest (q) qualified for the semifinals.

Wind:
Heat 1: +2.1 m/s, Heat 2: +0.6 m/s, Heat 3: +2.2 m/s, Heat 4: +0.9 m/s

Rank	Heat	Name	Nationality	Time	Notes
1	1	Mikele Barber	United States	11.15	Q
2	1	Chandra Sturrup	Bahamas	11.15	Q
3	4	Sherry Fletcher	Grenada	11.18	Q, NR
4	3	Tahesia Harrigan	British Virgin Islands	11.21	Q
5	3	Virgen Benavides	Cuba	11.24	Q
6	2	Mechelle Lewis	United States	11.27	Q
7	3	Laverne Jones	United States Virgin Islands	11.28	Q
8	1	Lucimar de Moura	Brazil	11.31	Q
9	2	Virgil Hodge	Saint Kitts and Nevis	11.35	Q
10	3	Tracy-Ann Rowe	Jamaica	11.37	q
11	2	Sasha Springer-Jones	Trinidad and Tobago	11.50	Q
12	4	Carol Rodríguez	Puerto Rico	11.53	Q
13	1	Peta-Gaye Dowdie	Jamaica	11.63	q
14	4	Misleidys Lazo	Cuba	11.67	Q
15	1	Jade Bailey	Barbados	11.68	q
16	3	Ayanna Hutchinson	Trinidad and Tobago	11.70	q
17	4	Tamica Clarke	Bahamas	11.72	
18	4	Marleny Mejía	Dominican Republic	11.76	
19	2	Shakera Reece	Barbados	11.82	
20	2	Luciana dos Santos	Brazil	11.82	
21	1	Sonia Williams	Antigua and Barbuda	11.89	
22	1	Maria Carolina Díaz	Chile	12.05	
23	3	Yessica Perea	Ecuador	12.18	
24	4	Kirsten Nieuwendam	Suriname	12.29	
25	2	Tricia Flores	Belize	12.37	
	2	Cydonie Mothersill	Cayman Islands	DNS	

=== Semifinals ===
Qualification: First 4 of each semifinal (Q) qualified directly for the final.

Wind:
Heat 1: +0.6 m/s, Heat 2: +0.1 m/s

Rank	Heat	Name	Nationality	Time	Notes
1	1	Mikele Barber	United States	11.18	Q
1	2	Mechelle Lewis	United States	11.18	Q
1	2	Chandra Sturrup	Bahamas	11.18	Q, SB
4	1	Sherry Fletcher	Grenada	11.20	Q
5	2	Tahesia Harrigan	British Virgin Islands	11.28	Q
6	1	Laverne Jones	United States Virgin Islands	11.32	Q
7	1	Virgil Hodge	Saint Kitts and Nevis	11.33	Q
8	1	Peta-Gaye Dowdie	Jamaica	11.43	
9	2	Tracy-Ann Rowe	Saint Kitts and Nevis	11.44	Q
10	1	Virgen Benavides	Cuba	11.45	
11	2	Sasha Springer-Jones	Trinidad and Tobago	11.46	
12	2	Lucimar de Moura	Brazil	11.60	
13	2	Misleidys Lazo	Cuba	11.76	
14	1	Ayanna Hutchinson	Trinidad and Tobago	11.77	
15	1	Carol Rodríguez	Puerto Rico	11.78	
16	2	Jade Bailey	Barbados	11.79	

=== Final ===
Wind: +0.8 m/s

Rank	Lane	Name	Nationality	Time	Notes
1st place, gold medalist(s)	4	Mikele Barber	United States	11.02	GR
2nd place, silver medalist(s)	3	Mechelle Lewis	United States	11.24	
3rd place, bronze medalist(s)	5	Chandra Sturrup	Bahamas	11.29	
4	7	Tahesia Harrigan	British Virgin Islands	11.34	
5	6	Sherry Fletcher	Grenada	11.36	
6	1	Virgil Hodge	Saint Kitts and Nevis	11.40	
7	2	Laverne Jones	United States Virgin Islands	11.49	
8	8	Tracy-Ann Rowe	Jamaica	11.56	
