= Carol Rodríguez =

Puerto Rican sprinter

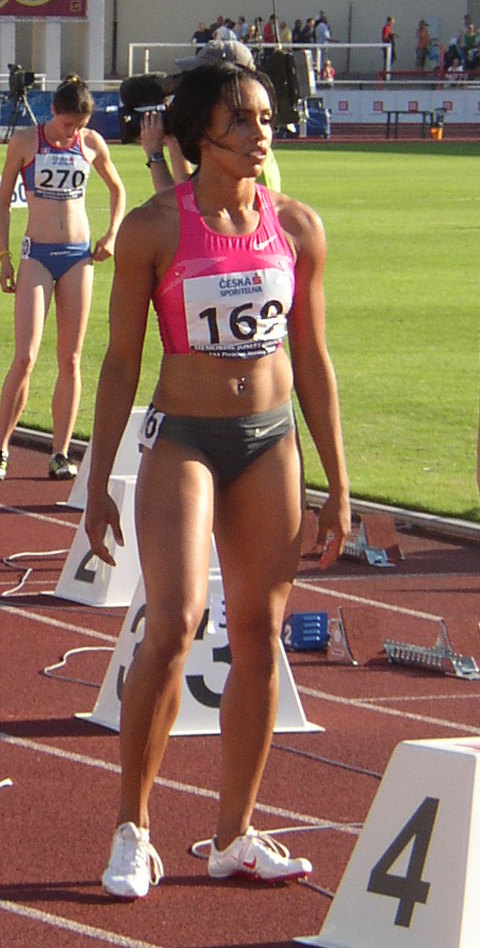
- Rodríguez at the 2010 Josef Odložil Memorial in Prague

Personal information
- Full name: Carol Ann Rodríguez
- Born: 26 December 1985 (age 40) Pomona, California
- Occupation: radio personality on Dash Radio
- Height: 1.75 m (5 ft 9 in)
- Weight: 65 kg (143 lb)

Sport
- Country: Puerto Rico
- Sport: Athletics
- Events: 200 m, 400 m
Medal record
Central American and Caribbean Games
| Gold medal – first place | 2010 Mayagüez | 4 × 100 m |
| Silver medal – second place | 2010 Mayagüez | 200 m |
CAC Junior Championships (U20)
| Silver medal – second place | 2004 Coatzacoalcos | 4 × 400 m relay |
| Bronze medal – third place | 2004 Coatzacoalcos | 100 m |
- Updated on 4 January 2015

Carol Ann Rodríguez (born 26 December 1985) is a Puerto Rican sprinter. Her mother is an African American from New Orleans, and her father grew up in Yauco, Puerto Rico.

Carol Rodríguez is currently the Host of Sports Run and Then Some on iCraft Radio on Dash Radio.

== Career ==
Rodríguez competed in both the 200 and 400 metres at the 2008 Olympic Games, and the 400 metres at the 2012 Summer Olympics, without reaching the final round.

She has 22.23 seconds in the 200 meters, achieved in May 2006 in Provo; 51.39 seconds in the 400 meters, achieved in June 2008 in Des Moines; 11.28 seconds in the 100 meters, achieved in May 2009 in New York City; and 7.56 seconds in the 60 metres, achieved in January 2006 in Pullman.

Rodríguez grew up in Southern California, attending Western High School in Anaheim, California for her first three years. At the 2003 CIF California State Meet, she finished third in the 100 metres behind Allyson Felix and Shalonda Solomon as a junior, but did not make it back to the meet her senior year after she transferred to Long Beach Wilson High School.

She next went to the University of Southern California majoring in sociology. At the 2006 NCAA Women's Outdoor Track and Field Championships she finished third in the 100 m, fourth in the 200 m and anchored USC's third place 4 × 100 metres relay team. The relay team repeated their third-place finish in 2007, while Rodriguez finished fourth in the 100 m. She holds the USC school record in the 200 m (surpassing World Champion Inger Miller) and 400 m.

== Personal bests ==
| Event | Result | Venue | Date |
Outdoor
| 100 m | 11.28 s (wind: +1.3 m/s) | New York City, United States | 30 May 2009 |
| 200 m | 22.23 s (wind: +1.8 m/s) | Provo, United States | 26 May 2006 |
| 400 m | 51.39 s | Los Angeles, United States | 3 May 2008 |
Indoor
| 60 m | 7.44 s | Pullman, United States | 27 January 2007 |
| 200 m | 22.77 s | Fayetteville, United States | 10 March 2006 |
| 400 m | 54.14 s | College Station, United States | 11 February 2012 |

== Achievements ==
| Year | Competition | Venue | Position | Event | Notes |
Representing Puerto Rico
| 2004 | Central American and Caribbean; Junior Championships (U-20) | Coatzacoalcos, Mexico | 3rd | 100 m | 11.73 (+0.6 m/s) |
| 2004 | Central American and Caribbean; Junior Championships (U-20) | Coatzacoalcos, Mexico | 5th | 200 m | 24.24 w (+2.7 m/s) |
| 2004 | Central American and Caribbean; Junior Championships (U-20) | Coatzacoalcos, Mexico | 2nd | 4 × 400 m | 3:44.87 |
| 2005 | Central American and Caribbean Championships | Nassau, Bahamas | 15th (h) | 100 m | 12.11 (+0.4 m/s) |
| 2006 | NACAC Under-23 Championships | Santo Domingo, Dominican Republic | 3rd | 100 m | 11.40 (+1.0 m/s) |
| 2006 | NACAC Under-23 Championships | Santo Domingo, Dominican Republic | 3rd | 200 m | 23.27 (+0.5 m/s) |
| 2007 | NACAC Championships | San Salvador, El Salvador | 3rd | 100 m | 11.47 (-0.3 m/s) |
| 2007 | NACAC Championships | San Salvador, El Salvador | 4th (h)^{1} | 200 m | 23.31 w (+2.5 m/s) |
| 2007 | Pan American Games | Rio de Janeiro, Brazil | 15th (sf) | 100 m | 11.78 (+0.6 m/s) |
| 2007 | Pan American Games | Rio de Janeiro, Brazil | 4th | 4 × 100 m | 43.81 |
| 2008 | Central American and Caribbean Championships | Cali, Colombia | 13th (h) | 400 m | 53.64 A |
| 2008 | Central American and Caribbean Championships | Cali, Colombia | 4th | 4 × 100 m | 44.34 A |
| 2008 | Olympic Games | Beijing, China | 40th (h) | 200 m | 24.07 (-0.4 m/s) |
| 2008 | Olympic Games | Beijing, China | 36th (h) | 400 m | 53.08 |
| 2009 | Central American and Caribbean Championships | Havana, Cuba | 3rd | 100 m | 11.38 (+0.8 m/s) |
| 2009 | Central American and Caribbean Championships | Havana, Cuba | 4th | 200 m | 23.61 (-1.2 m/s) |
| 2009 | Central American and Caribbean Championships | Havana, Cuba | 5th | 4 × 100 m | 44.08 |
| 2009 | World Championships | Berlin, Germany | 32nd (h) | 100 m | 11.64 (-0.1 m/s) |
| 2009 | World Championships | Berlin, Germany | 29th (h) | 200 m | 23.54 (+0.1 m/s) |
| 2010 | Ibero-American Championships | San Fernando, Spain | 4th | 100 m | 11.57 (+0.1 m/s) |
| 2010 | Ibero-American Championships | San Fernando, Spain | 3rd | 200 m | 23.54 (+0.5 m/s) |
| 2010 | Ibero-American Championships | San Fernando, Spain | — | 4 × 100 m | DQ |
| 2010 | Ibero-American Championships | San Fernando, Spain | — | 4 × 400 m | DQ |
| 2010 | Central American and Caribbean Games | Mayagüez, Puerto Rico | 4th | 100 m | 11.56 (0.0 m/s) |
| 2010 | Central American and Caribbean Games | Mayagüez, Puerto Rico | 2nd | 200 m | 23.37 (-0.9 m/s) |
| 2010 | Central American and Caribbean Games | Mayagüez, Puerto Rico | — | 4 × 100 m | DQ |
| 2011 | Central American and Caribbean Championships | Mayagüez, Puerto Rico | 12th (h) | 200 m | 23.98 (+0.1 m/s) |
| 2011 | Central American and Caribbean Championships | Mayagüez, Puerto Rico | — | 4 × 100 m | DNF |
| 2012 | Olympic Games | London, United Kingdom | 17th (sf) | 400 m | 52.08 |
| 2013 | Central American and Caribbean Championships | Morelia, Mexico | 6th | 200 m | 23.69 A (-0.6 m/s) |
| 2013 | Central American and Caribbean Championships | Morelia, Mexico | 7th | 400 m | 53.81 A |
| 2013 | Central American and Caribbean Championships | Morelia, Mexico | 4th | 4 × 400 m | 3:38.13 A |
| 2014 | World Relays | Nassau, Bahamas | 12th (B) | 4 × 100 m | 43.99 |
| 2014 | Central American and Caribbean Games | Xalapa, Mexico | 4th | 4 × 100 m | 44.33 A |
| 2015 | Pan American Games | Toronto, Canada | 6th | 4 × 400 m | 3:33.16 |
| 2015 | NACAC Championships | San José, Costa Rica | 3rd (sf) | 200 m | 23.85 (-0.4 m/s) |
| 2015 | NACAC Championships | San José, Costa Rica | 6th | 400 m | 53.61 |
| 2015 | NACAC Championships | San José, Costa Rica | 2nd | 4 × 100 m | 43.51 |
| 2016 | Ibero-American Championships | Rio de Janeiro, Brazil | 2nd | 400 m | 52.46 |
| 2016 | Ibero-American Championships | Rio de Janeiro, Brazil | 1st | 4 × 100 m | 43.55 |

^{1}: Did not start in the final.
