= Virgen Benavides =

Cuban sprinter (born 1974)

Personal information
- Full name: Virgen Benavides Muñoz
- Born: December 31, 1974 (age 51) Songo – La Maya, Santiago de Cuba
- Height: 1.62 m (5 ft 4 in)
- Weight: 54 kg (119 lb)

Sport
- Country: Cuba
- Sport: Athletics
Medal record
Representing Cuba
Summer Universiade
Bronze medal – third place	1999 Palma de Mallorca	100m
Pan American Games
Bronze medal – third place	2007 Rio de Janeiro	4x100m relay
Central American and Caribbean Games
Gold medal – first place	1998 Maracaibo	4x100m relay
Gold medal – first place	2006 Cartagena	4x100m relay
- Updated on 7 June 2013

Virgen Benavides Muñoz (born December 13 or 31, 1974) is a track and field sprint athlete who competes internationally for Cuba.

Benavides represented Cuba at the 2008 Summer Olympics in Beijing. She competed at the 100 metres sprint and placed third in her first round heat after Ivet Lalova and Montell Douglas in a time of 11.45 seconds. She qualified for the second round in which she failed to qualify for the semi-finals as her time of 11.40 was the fifth time of her race.

== Personal best ==
Outdoor

- 100 m: 11.14 s (wind: +1.3 m/s) – (Cuba) Camagüey, 26 February 1999
- 200 m: 22.93 s (wind: +0.6 m/s) – (Cuba) Camagüey, 11 March 2000

Indoor

- 60 m: 7.16 s – (Germany) Karlsruhe, 15 February 2004

== Achievements ==
Year	Competition	Venue	Position	Event	Notes
Representing Cuba
1995	Central American and Caribbean Championships	Guatemala City, Guatemala	1st	4 × 100 m relay	44.41
1998	Central American and Caribbean Games	Maracaibo, Venezuela	5th	100 m	11.66 s (wind: -0.6 m/s)
1998	Central American and Caribbean Games	Maracaibo, Venezuela	4th	200 m	23.28 s w (wind: +3.6 m/s)
1998	Central American and Caribbean Games	Maracaibo, Venezuela	1st	4 × 100 m relay	43.89
1999	Universiade	Palma de Mallorca, Spain	3rd	100 m	11.25 s (wind: +1.2 m/s)
1999	Pan American Games	Winnipeg, Canada	4th	100 m	11.28 s (wind: +1.7 m/s)
2001	Central American and Caribbean Championships	Guatemala City, Guatemala	3rd	100 m	11.48 s (wind: -1.1 m/s) A
2001	Central American and Caribbean Championships	Guatemala City, Guatemala	3rd	200 m	23.36s (wind: -0.4 m/s) A
2003	World Indoor Championships	Birmingham, United Kingdom	4th (sf)	60 m	7.28 s
2003	Central American and Caribbean Championships	St. George's, Grenada	4th	100 metres	11.37 s (wind: +0.6 m/s)
2003	Pan American Games	Santo Domingo, Dominican Republic	4th	100 m	11.28 s (wind: +1.6 m/s)
2003	World Championships	Saint-Denis, France	5th (qf)	100 m	11.40 s (wind: +0.0 m/s)
2004	Ibero-American Championships	Huelva, Spain	1st	100 m	11.33 s (wind: +0.0 m/s)
2004	Olympic Games	Athens, Greece	6th (h)	4 × 100 m relay	43.60 s
2006	Central American and Caribbean Games	Cartagena, Colombia	5th	100 m	11.61 s (wind: +0.5 m/s)
2006	Central American and Caribbean Games	Cartagena, Colombia	1st	4 × 100 m relay	43.29 s
2007	ALBA Games	Caracas, Venezuela	1st	100 m	11.35 s (wind: +1.5 m/s)
2007	ALBA Games	Caracas, Venezuela	1st	4 × 100 m relay	43.86 s
2007	Pan American Games	Rio de Janeiro, Brazil	6th (sf)	100 m	11.45 s (wind: +0.6 m/s)
2007	Pan American Games	Rio de Janeiro, Brazil	3rd	4 × 100 m relay	43.80 s
2007	World Championships	Osaka, Japan	-	4 × 100 m relay	DQ (h)
2008	World Indoor Championships	Valencia, Spain	5th (sf)	60 m	7.25 s
2008	Central American and Caribbean Championships	Cali, Colombia	8th	100 m	11.55 s (wind: +1.2 m/s) A
2008	Olympic Games	Beijing, China	5th (qf)	100 m	11.40 s (wind: +0.1 m/s)
2009	ALBA Games	Havana, Cuba	1st	100 m	11.33 s w (wind: +3.9 m/s)
2009	ALBA Games	Havana, Cuba	1st	4 × 100 m relay	44.93 s
2009	Central American and Caribbean Championships	Havana, Cuba	4th (h)	100 m	11.65 s (wind: +1.1 m/s)
