= 2007 NACAC Championships in Athletics =

I NACAC Championships
- Logo for the 2007 NACAC Championships
- Dates: July 13–15, 2007
- Host city: San Salvador, El Salvador
- Venue: Flor Blanca National Stadium
- Level: Senior
- Events: 42
- Participation: 275 athletes from 26 nations

The 2007 North American, Central American and Caribbean Championships was a regional track and field competition held at the Flor Blanca National Stadium in San Salvador, El Salvador, from July 13–15, 2007. It was the inaugural edition of a senior track and field championship for the NACAC region. A total of forty-three events were contested, 22 by male and 21 by female athletes.

The championships prepared for the 2007 Pan American Games, held later that month, for many senior athletes. Canada and Cuba, two of the region's strongest countries in the sport, did not send a delegation to participate. One further event—the women's 10,000 metres—was initially scheduled for the championships, but was subsequently not held in San Salvador.

The United States sent the largest contingent to the competition and, although many were developmental athletes, Americans dominated the competition, winning twenty-eight of the events and fifteen minor medals for a total of 43. Mexico was the next best performers, claiming four golds, fourteen silvers and two bronze medals. Trinidad and Tobago took three golds in their eleven medal haul, while the hosts El Salvador also won three events.

Mary Jayne Harrelson completed an 800/1500 metres double win. Americans Calvin Smith Jr. and Debbie Dunn took the 400 metres individual titles, before going on the help the relay teams to another gold. Cristina López of El Salvador won the 10 km walk title and went on to win Pan American gold later that month. The NACAC high jump silver medallist Romary Rifka improved to the gold at that tournament.

== Medal summary ==
=== Men ===
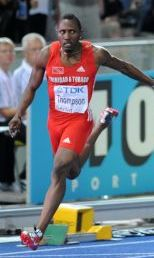
Richard Thompson won the men's 100 m gold medal.

Event	Gold		Silver		Bronze	
100 metres	Richard Thompson (TRI)	10.322	Monzavous Edwards (USA)	10.327	Abidemi Omole (USA)	10.34
200 metres	Jordan Vaden (USA)	20.17	Michael Mitchell (USA)	20.48	Chris Lloyd (DMA)	20.73
400 metres	Calvin Smith Jr. (USA)	45.52	Arismendy Peguero (DOM)	45.63	Nery Brenes (CRC)	46.00
800 metres	Golden Coachman (USA)	1:49.01	Pablo Solares (MEX)	1:49.28	Moise Joseph (HAI)	1:50.25
1500 metres	Pablo Solares (MEX)	3:45.29	Isaías Haro (MEX)	3:48.53	Luis Soto (PUR)	3:49.69
5000 metres	Ben Bruce (USA)	14:27.90	Julio Pérez (MEX)	14:29.45	José Amado García (GUA)	14.33.31
10,000 metres	Julio Perez (MEX)	29.38.31	José Amado García (GUA)	29.42.11	Only two competitors	
110 m hurdles	Dexter Faulk (USA)	13.35	Decosma Wright (JAM)	13.67	Linnie Yarbrough (USA)	13.70
400 m hurdles	LaRon Bennett (USA)	48.76	Jonathan Williams (BLZ)	48.88	Javier Culson (PUR)	49.31
3000 m steeplechase	Michael Spence (USA)	8.39.51	Josafat Gonzalez (MEX)	8.43.08	Ben Bruce (USA)	8.56.09
4 × 100 m relay	United States (USA); Abidemi Omole; Jordan Vaden; Michael Mitchell; Monzavous Edwards	38.99	Jamaica (JAM); Decosma Wright; Orlando Reid; Tristan Taylor; Carl Barret	39.77	Trinidad and Tobago (TRI); Niconnor Alexander; Richard Thompson; Rondel Sorrillo; Emmanuel Callander	39.92
4 × 400 m relay	United States (USA); Reuben McCoy; Calvin Smith Jr. Michael Mitchell; David Neville	3:02.78	Jamaica (JAM); DeWayne Barrett; Lansford Spence; Bryan Steele; Michael Manson	3:04.32	Dominican Republic (DOM); Carlos Santa; Pedro Mejía; Yoel Tapia; Arismendy Peguero	3:04.96
20 km track walk	Walter Sandoval (ESA)	1:28.29	David Mejia (MEX)	1:28.51	Allan Segura (CRC)	1:29.50
High jump	Adam Shunk (USA)	2.23 m	Gerardo Martínez (MEX)	2.21 m	Julio Luciano (DOM)	2.17 m
Pole vault	José Montano (MEX)	5.15 m	Cristian Sanchez (MEX)	4.80 m	Jeremy Scott (USA)	4.80 m
Long jump	Carlos Jorge (DOM)	7.89 m	Tyrone Harris (USA)	7.83 m	Le Juan Simon (TRI)	7.71 m
Triple jump	Marc Kellman (USA)	16.50 m	Allen Simms (PUR)	16.37 m	Le Juan Simon (TRI)	15.72 m
Shot put	Rhuben Williams (USA)	18.43 m	Tyron Benjamin (DMA)	16.81 m	Jorge Castro (GUA)	13.91 m
Discus throw	Nick Petrucci (USA)	56.17 m	Adonson Shallow (VIN)	52.39 m	Jesús Sánchez (MEX)	50.15 m
Hammer throw	Jake Freeman (USA)	70.32 m	Luis Saavedra (MEX)	62.62 m	Roberto Sawyers (CRC)	61.98 m
Javelin throw	Justin St. Clair (USA)	73.16 m	Darwin Garcia (DOM)	69.64 m	Rigoberto Calderón (NIC)	66.50 m
Decathlon	Darwin Colón (HON)	6330 pts	Adolphus Jones (SKN)	6092 pts	Only two competitors	

=== Women ===
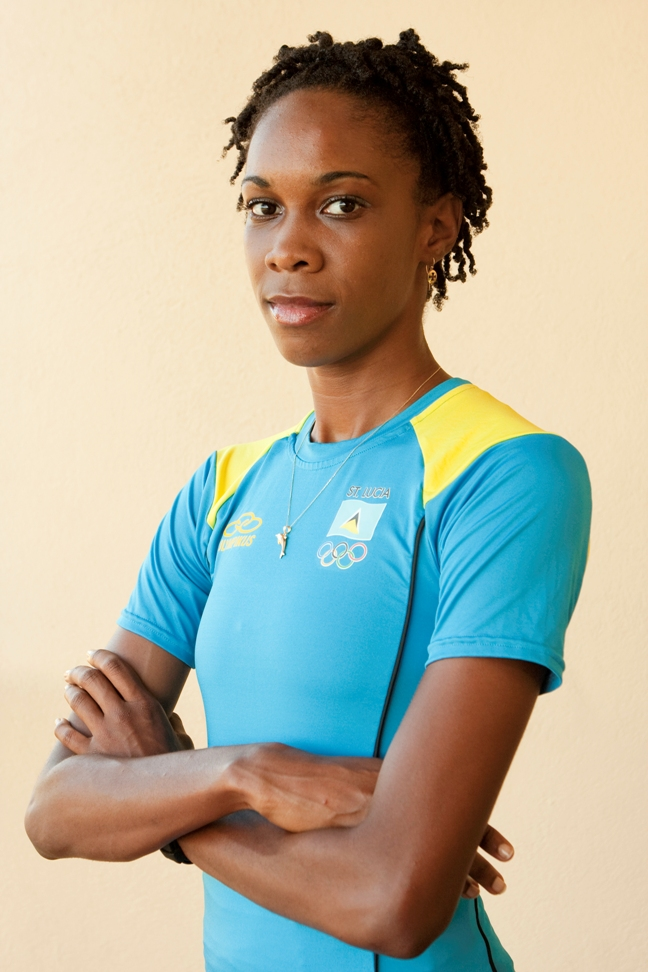
Lavern Spencer won the women's high jump.

Event	Gold		Silver		Bronze	
100 metres	Mechelle Lewis (USA)	11.37	Alexis Weatherspoon (USA)	11.43	Carol Rodríguez (PUR)	11.47
200 metres (wind: 2.2 m/s)	Virgil Hodge (SKN)	22.73 w	Shareese Woods (USA)	22.97 w	Latonia Wilson (USA)	23.14 w
400 metres	Debbie Dunn (USA)	52.68	Clora Williams (JAM)	53.27	Kineke Alexander (VIN)	53.52
800 metres	Mary Jayne Harrelson (USA)	2:05.10	Lizaira Del Valle (PUR)	2:05.73	Sheena Gooding (BAR)	2:06.01
1500 metres	Mary Jayne Harrelson (USA)	4:30.09	Yamilé Alaluf (MEX)	4:37.64	Sonny Garcia (DOM)	4:49.62
5000 metres	Whitney McDonald (USA)	16:42.12	Marisol Romero (MEX)	17:00.47	Elsa Monterosso (GUA)	17:59.85
100 m hurdles	Candice Davis (USA)	13.12	Tiffany Ofili (USA)	13.27	Monique Morgan (JAM)	13.39
400 m hurdles	Latosha Wallace (USA)	56.54	Carlene Robinson (JAM)	57.25	Sherlenia Green (USA)	58.26
3000 m steeplechase	Kristin Anderson (USA)	10:21.82	Sandra Lopez Reyes (MEX)	11:04.79	Gabriela Trana (CRC)	11:11.17
4 × 100 m relay	Jamaica (JAM); Nadine Palmer; Rose Whyte; Anneisha McLaughlin; Peta-Gaye Dowdie	43.73	United States (USA); Shameka Marshall; Alexis Weatherspoon; Candice Davis; Mechelle Lewis	43.91	Trinidad and Tobago (TRI); Ayanna Hutchinson; Sasha Springer; Nandelle Cameron; Fana Ashby	43.98
4 × 400 m relay	United States (USA); Latosha Wallace; Shareese Woods; Latonia Wilson; Debbie Dunn	3:29.15	Jamaica (JAM); Ronetta Smith; Carlene Robinson; Rose Whyte; Clora Williams	3:30.16	El Salvador (ESA); Veronica Quijano; Josselin Escobar; Natalia Santamaria; Jessica Bautista	4:01.50
10 km track walk	Cristina López (ESA)	44:16.21	Veronica Colindres (ESA)	47:39.93	Evelyn Nunez (GUA)	47:40.36
High jump	Levern Spencer (LCA)	1.89 m	Romary Rifka (MEX)	1.87 m	Juana Arrendel (DOM)	1.87 m
Pole vault	Becky Holliday (USA)	4.15 m	Cecilia Villar (MEX)	3.60 m	Glayds Quijada (ESA)	3.50 m
Long jump	Shameka Marshall (USA)	6.34 m	Nolle Graham (JAM)	6.26 m	Tanika Liburd (SKN)	6.12 m
Triple jump	Ayanna Alexander (TRI)	13.29 m (w)	Tiombe Hurd (USA)	13.22 m	Amy Seward (PUR)	12.93 m
Shot put	Cleopatra Borel-Brown (TRI)	17.53 m	Annie Alexander (TRI)	15.89 m	Shernelle Nicholls (BAR)	15.82 m
Discus throw	Stephanie Trafton (USA)	59.27 m	Annie Alexander (TRI)	53.63 m	Shernelle Nicholls (BAR)	51.15 m
Hammer throw	Jessica Cosby (USA)	65.15 m	Candice Scott (TRI)	60.52 m	Jessica Ponce (MEX)	58.95 m
Javelin throw	Ana Gutiérrez (MEX)	51.52 m	Anna Raynor (USA)	50.86 m	Erma-Gene Evans (LCA)	47.95 m
Heptathlon	Gabriela Carrillo (ESA)	5022 pts	Mariana Abuela (MEX)	4824 pts	Natoya Baird (TRI)	4611 pts

== Medal table ==
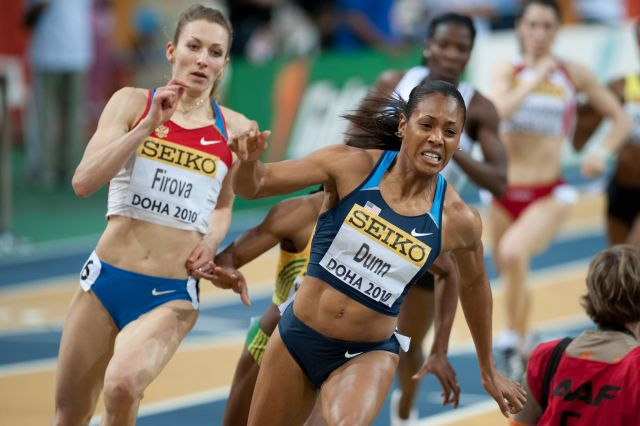
Debbie Dunn won 400 m individual and relay golds for the United States.

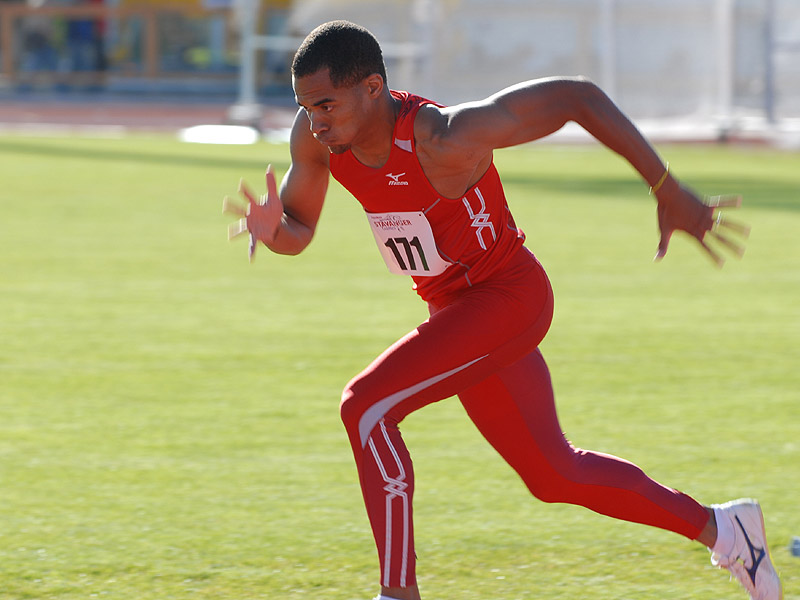
Allen Simms took triple jump silver for Puerto Rico.

* Host nation (El Salvador)

Rank	Nation	Gold	Silver	Bronze	Total
1	United States	28	9	6	43
2	Mexico	4	14	2	20
3	Trinidad and Tobago	3	3	5	11
4	El Salvador*	3	1	2	6
5	Jamaica	1	7	1	9
6	Dominican Republic	1	2	4	7
7	Saint Kitts and Nevis	1	1	1	3
8	Saint Lucia	1	0	1	2
9	Honduras	1	0	0	1
10	Puerto Rico	0	2	4	6
11	Guatemala	0	1	4	5
12	Dominica	0	1	1	2
12	Saint Vincent and the Grenadines	0	1	1	2
14	Belize	0	1	0	1
15	Barbados	0	0	3	3
15	Costa Rica	0	0	3	3
17	Haiti	0	0	1	1
17	Nicaragua	0	0	1	1
Totals (18 entries)		43	43	40	126

== Participating nations ==
- Anguilla (1)
- Aruba (1)
- Barbados (7)
- Bermuda (2)
- Belize (5)
- British Virgin Islands (5)
- Cayman Islands (6)
- Costa Rica (13)
- Dominica (3)
- Dominican Republic (28)
- Guatemala (12)
- Haiti (2)
- Honduras (6)
- Jamaica (21)
- Mexico (31)
- Netherlands Antilles (4)
- Nicaragua (1)
- Puerto Rico (19)
- El Salvador (19)
- Saint Kitts and Nevis (10)
- Saint Lucia (3)
- Saint Vincent and the Grenadines (5)
- Trinidad and Tobago (19)
- Turks and Caicos Islands (1)
- United States (45)
- United States Virgin Islands (6)
