= Athletics at the 1999 Pan American Games – Women's 100 metres =

Women's 100 metres at the Pan American Games

The women's 100 metres event at the 1999 Pan American Games was held July 24–25.

== Medalists ==
Gold	Silver	Bronze
Chandra Sturrup; Bahamas	Angela Williams; United States	Peta-Gaye Dowdie; Jamaica

== Results ==
=== Heats ===
Qualification: First 2 of each heat (Q) and the next 2 fastest (q) qualified for the final.

Wind:
Heat 1: +1.4 m/s, Heat 2: +0.4 m/s, Heat 3: -1.1 m/s

Rank	Heat	Name	Nationality	Time	Notes
1	1	Philomena Mensah	Canada	11.19	Q
2	2	Peta-Gaye Dowdie	Jamaica	11.25	Q
3	3	Virgen Benavides	Cuba	11.28	Q
4	1	Chandra Sturrup	Bahamas	11.31	Q
5	2	Liliana Allen	Mexico	11.40	Q
6	2	Lucimar Moura	Brazil	11.42	q
7	1	Beverly Grant	Jamaica	11.49	q
8	1	Heather Samuel	Antigua and Barbuda	11.52	
8	3	Angela Williams	United States	11.52	Q
10	2	Cydonie Mothersille	Cayman Islands	11.53	
11	3	Eldece Clarke-Lewis	Bahamas	11.58	
12	1	Torri Edwards	United States	11.70	
13	3	Mirtha Brock	Colombia	11.74	
14	1	Idalia Hechevarría	Cuba	11.87	
15	3	Ana Caicedo	Ecuador	12.05	

=== Final ===
Wind: +1.7 m/s

Rank	Name	Nationality	Time	Notes
1st place, gold medalist(s)	Chandra Sturrup	Bahamas	11.10	
2nd place, silver medalist(s)	Angela Williams	United States	11.16	
3rd place, bronze medalist(s)	Peta-Gaye Dowdie	Jamaica	11.20	
4	Virgen Benavides	Cuba	11.28	
5	Philomena Mensah	Canada	11.28	
6	Lucimar Moura	Brazil	11.29	
7	Beverly Grant	Jamaica	11.53	
8	Liliana Allen	Mexico	11.66	
