= Richard Thompson (sprinter) =

Trinidadian sprinter (born 1985)

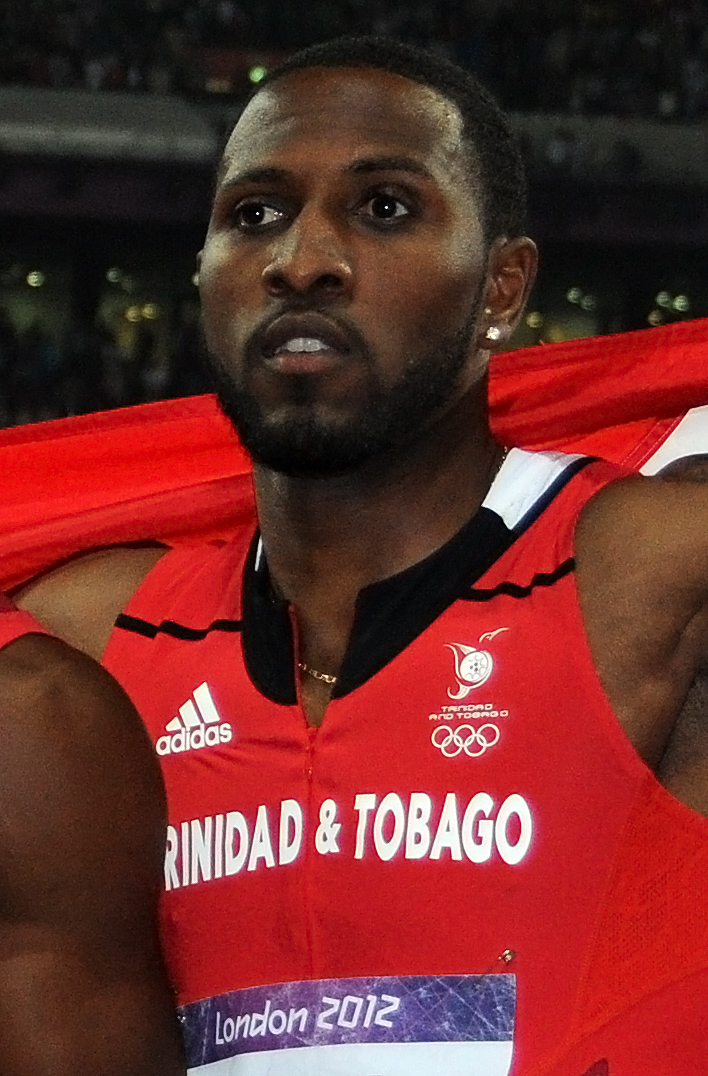
- Thompson at the 2012 Olympic Games

Personal information
- Nationality: Trinidad and Tobago
- Born: 7 June 1985 (age 41) Cascade, Trinidad & Tobago
- Height: 1.88 m (6 ft 2 in)
- Weight: 80 kg (180 lb)

Sport
- Sport: Running
- Events: 100 metres, 200 metres
- College team: LSU Tigers
Medal record
Men's athletics
Representing Trinidad & Tobago
Olympic Games
| Gold medal – first place | 2008 Beijing | 4 × 100 m relay |
| Silver medal – second place | 2008 Beijing | 100 m |
| Silver medal – second place | 2012 London | 4 × 100 m relay |
World Championships
| Silver medal – second place | 2009 Berlin | 4 × 100 m relay |
NACAC Championships
| Gold medal – first place | 2007 San Salvador | 100 m |
| Bronze medal – third place | 2007 San Salvador | 4 × 100 m relay |
CAC Championships
| Gold medal – first place | 2008 Cali | 4 × 100 m relay |
Commonwealth Games
| Bronze medal – third place | 2014 Glasgow | 4 × 100 m relay |
IAAF World Relays
| Silver medal – second place | 2014 Nassau | 4 × 100 m relay |

Richard "Torpedo" Thompson (born 7 June 1985) is a Trinidadian sprinter who specializes in the 100 metres. His personal best of 9.82 seconds, set in June 2014, was one of the top ten fastest of all time, and a national record. In the 200 meters, he has the fourth fastest time by a Trinidad and Tobago athlete.

Thompson studied at Louisiana State University (LSU) and broke the National Collegiate Athletic Association (NCAA) indoor 60 metres record in 2008, his final season of collegiate athletics.

At the 2008 Beijing Olympics, Thompson was the silver medalist in the 100 meters, running a then personal best of 9.89 seconds, and the gold medalist in the 4 × 100 meters relay along with Emmanuel Callender, Keston Bledman and Marc Burns. He also won the silver medal in the 4x100 meters at the 2012 Olympics with the same team he competed in the 2008 Olympics with. Also in the 2012 Olympics, he finished 6th following the disqualification of Tyson Gay in the final of the 100 meters. Thompson is a five time Trinidad and Tobago national champion. His current personal best of 9.82 was set at the 2014 Trinidad and Tobago national championships.

In 2017, fellow sprinter and 2008 Olympic Games men's relay gold medalist Nesta Carter was sanctioned by the International Olympic Committee for doping at the 2008 event, retroactively awarding the Trinidad and Tobago team which included Thompson Olympic Gold.

== Early life ==
Born on 7 June 1985 in Cascade, Port of Spain, Thompson is the last of four children of Ruthven and Judith Thompson. He attended Queen's Royal College in Port of Spain where he was coached by Ashwin Creed. He competed at the 2004 Hampton Games running a time of 10.65 in the 100 meters.

== Amateur career ==
He ran for Louisiana State University as a member of the LSU Tigers track and field team and set NCAA Indoor record in the 60 metres in 2008. That year he won the NCAA Men's Outdoor Track Athlete of the Year Award and the SEC Men's Outdoor Track Athlete of the Year award.

== Professional career ==
In his first World Championships in Athletics in Osaka in 2007, Thompson reached the second round but finished eighth in a time of 10.44 seconds. His personal best time is 9.89 seconds, achieved in August 2008 in Beijing, China, during the Olympic 100 m final where he won silver. Thompson's personal best for the 200 metres is 20.18 s which ran in Fayetteville for LSU. His 60 metres best is 6.51 s, achieved in March 2008 in Fayetteville. He won the relay gold medal at the 2008 Central American and Caribbean Championships with Trinidad and Tobago.

In the 2008 Summer Olympics, he competed in the 100 m sprint and placed first in his heat ahead of Martial Mbandjock with a time of 10.24 s. He qualified for the second round, beating Tyson Gay and Mbandjock, with a winning time of 9.99 s. He qualified in the semi-finals with a time of 9.93 s, finishing second to Asafa Powell. In the final, he finished in second place; he was far behind winner Usain Bolt (9.69 s) but his time of 9.89 s was enough to win the silver medal and set a new personal best. His new best time made him the second fastest Trinidadian 100 m sprinter ever, after Ato Boldon.

Together with Keston Bledman, Aaron Armstrong and Marc Burns he also competed at the 4 × 100 metres relay. In their qualification heat, they placed first in front of Japan, the Netherlands and Brazil. Their time of 38.26 s was the fastest of all sixteen teams participating in the first round and they qualified for the final. Armstrong was replaced by Emmanuel Callender for the final race and they sprinted to a time of 38.06 s, the second time after the Jamaican team, winning the silver medal. In 2022, Thompson and his teammates received the gold medal due to Jamaica's Nesta Carter testing positive for the prohibited substance methylhexaneamine.

Thompson was involved in a car accident on 1 January 2009, resulting in minor injuries which caused him to miss the indoor athletics season. He competed at the 2009 World Championships in Athletics and reached the 100 m final, finishing in fifth place with a season's best of 9.93 seconds in fastest ever race at that point in time. He teamed up with fellow finalist Marc Burns for the relay and ran a national record time of 37.62 seconds to finish as runners-up behind the Jamaican team.

He achieved a 100/200 m double at the 2010 national championships. His season was highlighted by a win on the 2010 IAAF Diamond League circuit, taking the 100 m at the Prefontaine Classic with a wind-assisted time of 9.89 seconds. In August, Thompson broke the national record with a run of 9.85 s at the 2011 national championships. The achievement, which ranked him ninth fastest in all-time lists, eclipsed Ato Boldon's record by 0.01 seconds. Despite this form, he failed to make the 100 m final at the 2011 World Championships in Athletics, being eliminated in the semis, although he did anchor the relay team to fifth place in the final.

At the 2012 national championships, he had his win streak beaten by Keston Bledman and had to settle for second with his time of 9.96 seconds.

In the 2012, 100 m Olympic final, he gained the distinction of becoming the first man to break ten seconds and finish in seventh place. However, upon the disqualification of Tyson Gay due to doping, Thompson was promoted to sixth place.

During the 2014 national championships, he won the finals, improving the national record with a run of 9.82 s, becoming one of the 10 fastest 100 m runners ever.

== Major competition record ==
| Year | Competition | Venue | Position | Event | Notes |
Representing Trinidad and Tobago
| 2006 | NACAC U-23 Championships | Santo Domingo, Dominican Republic | 5th | 100 m | 10.42 (wind: +1.2 m/s) |
| 2006 | NACAC U-23 Championships | Santo Domingo, Dominican Republic | — | 200 m | DQ |
| 2006 | NACAC U-23 Championships | Santo Domingo, Dominican Republic | 3rd | 4 × 100 m relay | 39.98 |
| 2007 | NACAC Championships | San Salvador, El Salvador | 1st | 100 m | 10.32 |
| 2007 | NACAC Championships | San Salvador, El Salvador | 3rd | 4 × 100 m relay | 39.92 |
| 2007 | Pan American Games | Rio de Janeiro, Brazil | 4th (h) | 4 × 100 m relay | 39.02 |
| 2007 | World Championships | Osaka, Japan | 31st (h) | 100 m | 10.44 |
| 2008 | Central American and Caribbean Championships | Cali, Colombia | 1st | 4 × 100 m relay | 38.54 |
| 2008 | Olympic Games | Beijing, China | 2nd | 100 m | 9.89 |
| 2008 | Olympic Games | Beijing, China | 1st | 4 × 100 m relay | 38.06 |
| 2009 | World Championships | Berlin, Germany | 5th | 100 m | 9.93 |
| 2009 | World Championships | Berlin, Germany | 2nd | 4 × 100 m relay | 37.62 |
| 2011 | World Championships | Daegu, South Korea | 10th (sf) | 100 m | 10.20 |
| 2011 | World Championships | Daegu, South Korea | 6th | 4 × 100 m relay | 39.01 |
| 2012 | Olympic Games | London, United Kingdom | 7th | 100 m | 9.98 |
| 2012 | Olympic Games | London, United Kingdom | 3rd | 4 × 100 m relay | 38.12 |
| 2014 | Commonwealth Games | Glasgow, United Kingdom | sf | 100 m | 10.19 |
| 2014 | Commonwealth Games | Glasgow, United Kingdom | 3rd | 4 × 100 m relay | 38.10 |
| 2016 | Olympic Games | Rio de Janeiro, Brazil | 40th (h) | 100 m | 10.29 |
| 2016 | Olympic Games | Rio de Janeiro, Brazil | 6th (h) | 4 × 100 m relay | 37.96^{1} |
| 2021 | Olympic Games | Tokyo, Japan | 13th (h) | 4 × 100 m relay | 38.63 |

^{1}Disqualified in the final

=== Personal bests ===
| Date | Event | Venue | Time (seconds) |
|---|---|---|---|
| 15 March 2008 | 60 metres | Fayetteville, United States | 6.51 |
| 21 June 2014 | 100 metres | Port of Spain, Trinidad and Tobago | 9.82 |
| 30 May 2008 | 200 metres | Fayetteville, United States | 20.18 |

- 60 m and 200 m taken from IAAF profile
- 100 m taken from NAAA TT Website

=== Track records ===
As of 24 September 2024, Thompson holds the following track records for 100 metres.

| Location | Time | Windspeed m/s | Date |
|---|---|---|---|
| Clermont | 9.74 | (Note: The windspeed data for the Clermont, Florida run is not available but since Thompson's PB is 9.82 and the time for the Clermont run was faster than this at 9.74, the windspeed must have been greater than two metres per second. The windspeed at Clermont has been known to exceed five metres per second.) | 31 May 2014 |
| Hengelo | 9.95 | +1.4 | 8 June 2014 |
| Lignano Sabbiadoro | 10.06 | –0.7 | 19 July 2011 |
| Port of Spain | 9.82; PB | +1.7 | 21 June 2014 |
