= Sasha Springer-Jones =

Trinidad and Tobago sprinter

Personal information
- Born: 17 March 1978 (age 48) Port of Spain, Trinidad and Tobago
- Height: 1.65 m (5 ft 5 in)

Sport
- Sport: Track and field
- Club: South Florida Bulls

Achievements and titles
- Personal best: 11.31 s (100 m)

Sasha Springer-Jones (born 17 March 1978) is a sprint athlete from Trinidad and Tobago.

She was born in Port of Spain. Springer-Jones competed for the University of South Florida, the South Florida Bulls, in college. She competed at the 2002 NCAA Division I Indoor Championships during her collegiate years.

A breakthrough came in 2007, when she took the 100 metres title at the Trinidad and Tobago Championships. Her winning time of 11.31 seconds became her lifetime best. She also won national bronze in the 200 metres, before finishing fifth in the 100 metres at the 2007 NACAC Championships. She competed individually at the 2007 Pan American Games and the 2007 World Championships without reaching the final. She also finished seventh in the 4 × 100 metres relay at the 2007 Pan American Games, and won a relay bronze at the 2007 NACAC Championships.

The next year, the relay team of Semoy Hackett, Ayanna Hutchinson, Sasha Springer and Kelly Ann Baptiste set a Trinidad and Tobago record of 43.56 seconds and won the gold medal at the 2008 Central American and Caribbean Championships. With Semoy Hackett, Reyare Thomas and Ayanna Hutchinson, Springer won bronze at the 2009 Central American and Caribbean Championships.

Having only finished fifth at the 2008 Trinidad and Tobago Championships, she was eliminated in the quarter-final at the 2008 Olympic Games. She again finished fifth at the Trinidad and Tobago Championships in both 2009 and 2010, as well as in the relay at the 2010 Central American and Caribbean Games.
