= LeJuan Simon =

Athletics competitor

Personal information
- Born: February 7, 1981 Houston, Texas, United States
- Died: October 1, 2008 (aged 27) Baton Rouge, Louisiana

Sport
- Sport: Track and field
- Club: LSU Tigers
Medal record
Representing Trinidad and Tobago
NACAC Championships
Bronze medal – third place	2007 San Salvador	Long Jump
Bronze medal – third place	2007 San Salvador	Triple Jump

LeJuan Waynesley Simon (February 7, 1981, in Houston, Texas – October 1, 2008) was a Trinidad and Tobago triple jumper.

== Athletic career ==
He finished fifth at the 2006 Commonwealth Games. He also competed at the 2004 Olympic Games without reaching the final.

His personal best jump was 16.87 metres, achieved in May 2002 in Odessa. He had 17.05 metres on the indoor track, achieved in March 2004 in Fayetteville. He also had 8.01 metres in the long jump, achieved in May 2004 in Baton Rouge.

Simon was a member of the Louisiana State University track and field team.

== Death ==
Simon died on October 1, 2008, in Baton Rouge, Louisiana, from complications of primary pulmonary hypertension.

== Competition record ==
Year	Competition	Venue	Position	Event	Notes
Representing the United States
2002	NACAC U25 Championships	San Antonio, Texas, United States	3rd	Long jump	7.78 m (wind: -0.7 m/s)
2002	NACAC U25 Championships	San Antonio, Texas, United States	4th	Triple jump	15.57 m (wind: -0.9 m/s)
Representing Trinidad and Tobago
2004	Olympic Games	Athens, Greece	36th (q)	Triple jump	16.16 m
2006	Commonwealth Games	Melbourne, Australia	14th (q)	Long jump	7.42 m
2006	Commonwealth Games	Melbourne, Australia	5th	Triple jump	16.59 m
2006	Central American and Caribbean Games	Cartagena, Colombia	7th	Long jump	7.34 m
2006	Central American and Caribbean Games	Cartagena, Colombia	4th	Triple jump	16.33 m
2007	NACAC Championships	San Salvador, El Salvador	3rd	Long jump	7.71 m
2007	NACAC Championships	San Salvador, El Salvador	3rd	Triple jump	15.72 m
2007	Pan American Games	Rio de Janeiro, Brazil	17th (q)	Long jump	7.04 m
2007	Pan American Games	Rio de Janeiro, Brazil	–	Triple jump	NM
