= Emmanuel Callender =

Trinidad and Tobago sprinter (born 1984)

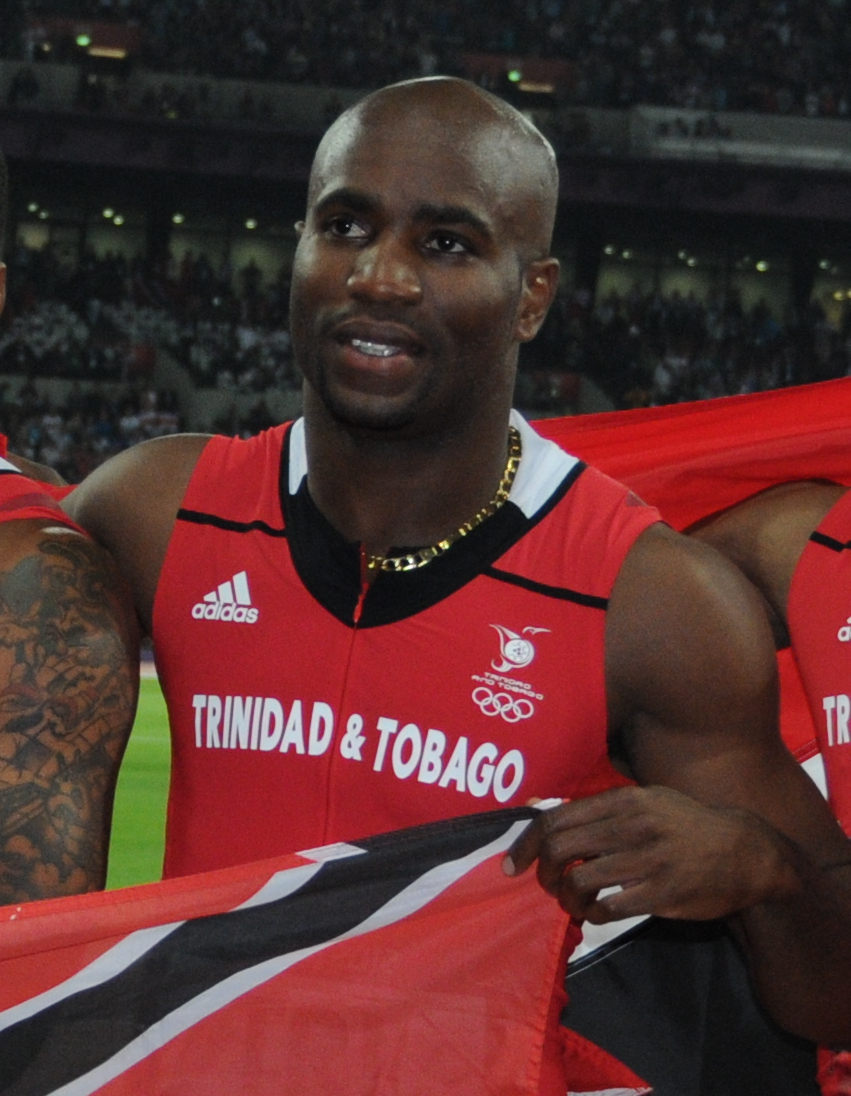
- Callender at the 2012 Olympics

Personal information
- Full name: Emmanuel Earl Callender
- Nickname: Eman
- Nationality: Trinidad and Tobago
- Born: 10 May 1984 (age 42) Arouca, Trinidad and Tobago
- Height: 1.89 m (6 ft 2 1/2 in)
- Weight: 86 kg (190 lb)

Sport
- Sport: Running

Achievements and titles
- Personal bests: 100 m: 10.05; 200 m: 20.40
Medal record
Men's athletics
Representing Trinidad and Tobago
Olympic Games
Gold medal – first place	2008 Beijing	4 × 100 m relay
Silver medal – second place	2012 London	4 × 100 m relay
World Championships
Silver medal – second place	2009 Berlin	4 × 100 m relay
Pan American Games
Bronze medal – third place	2011 Guadalajara	100 m
NACAC Championships
Bronze medal – third place	2007 San Salvador	4 × 100 m relay
CAC Championships
Gold medal – first place	2008 Cali	200 m
Gold medal – first place	2009 Havana	100 m
Silver medal – second place	2011 Mayagüez	4 × 100 m relay
Bronze medal – third place	2013 Morelia	4 × 100 m relay
- Updated on 7 August 2016

Emmanuel Earl Callender (born 10 May 1984) is a Trinidad and Tobago track and field sprint athlete.

Callender represented Trinidad and Tobago at the 2008 Summer Olympics in Beijing. He competed at the 4 × 100 m relay, together with Marc Burns, Aaron Armstrong, Keston Bledman and Richard Thompson. In their qualification heat (without Callender) they placed first in front of Japan, the Netherlands and Brazil. Their time of 38.26 was the fastest of all sixteen teams participating in the first round and they qualified for the final. Armstrong was replaced by Callender for the final race and they sprinted to a time of 38.06 seconds, the second fastest time after the Jamaican team, winning the silver medal.

At the 2012 Summer Olympics, he raced in the first round and the final, and Trinidad and Tobago won the silver medal.

Callender set new personal bests in the 100 and 200 meters at the Grande Prêmio Brasil Caixa meet in May 2009, recording times of 10.16 and 20.40 seconds respectively. Since then, he has improved his 100 m personal best, to 10.05 s.

== Personal bests ==
- 100 m: 10.05 s (wind: +0.4 m/s) – Zurich, Switzerland, 28 August 2009
- 200 m: 20.40 s (wind: +0.3 m/s) – Belém, Brazil, 24 May 2009
- 400 m: 48.47 s – Kingston, Jamaica, 26 January 2008

== International competitions ==
Year	Competition	Venue	Position	Event	Notes
Representing Trinidad and Tobago
2006	NACAC Under-23 Championships	Santo Domingo, Dominican Republic	3rd	4 × 100 m	39.98
2007	NACAC Championships	San Salvador, El Salvador	5th	200 m	20.93 (+1.8 m/s)
2007	NACAC Championships	San Salvador, El Salvador	3rd	4 × 100 m	39.92
2007	Pan American Games	Rio de Janeiro, Brazil	5th	200 m	21.03 (+0.8 m/s)
2007	Pan American Games	Rio de Janeiro, Brazil	4th	4 × 100 m	39.23
2008	Central American and Caribbean Championships	Cali, Colombia	1st	200 m	20.69 (+0.5 m/s)
2008	Olympic Games	Beijing, China	1st	4 × 100 m	38.06
2009	Central American and Caribbean Championships	Havana, Cuba	1st	100 m	10.08 (+0.1 m/s)
2009	Central American and Caribbean Championships	Havana, Cuba	200 m	10th (h)	21.10 (-0.5 m/s)
2009	Central American and Caribbean Championships	Havana, Cuba	1st	4 × 100 m	38.73
2009	World Championships	Berlin, Germany	26th (qf)	100 m	10.27 (+0.1 m/s)
2009	World Championships	Berlin, Germany	8th (sf)	200 m	20.70 (+0.3 m/s)
2009	World Championships	Berlin, Germany	2nd	4 × 100 m	37.62
2010	Central American and Caribbean Games	Mayagüez, Puerto Rico	3rd (h)^{†}	100 m	10.16 (+1.4 m/s)
2010	Central American and Caribbean Games	Mayagüez, Puerto Rico	6th	200 m	20.81 (0.0 m/s)
2010	Central American and Caribbean Games	Mayagüez, Puerto Rico	1st	4 × 100 m	38.24
2010	Commonwealth Games	Delhi, India	4th	100 m	10.25 (+0.3 m/s)
2010	Commonwealth Games	Delhi, India	7th	200 m	21.12 (+0.1 m/s)
2010	Commonwealth Games	Delhi, India	2nd (h)^{‡}	4 × 100 m	39.47
2011	Central American and Caribbean Championships	Mayagüez, Puerto Rico	5th	200 m	21.12 (+1.1 m/s)
2011	Central American and Caribbean Championships	Mayagüez, Puerto Rico	2nd	4 × 100 m	38.89
2011	World Championships	Daegu, South Korea	200 m	33rd (h)	20.97 (-0.3 m/s)
2011	Pan American Games	Guadalajara, Mexico	3rd	100 m	10.16 (+0.2 m/s)
2011	Pan American Games	Guadalajara, Mexico	–	4 × 100 m	DNF
2012	Olympic Games	London, United Kingdom	2nd	4 × 100 m	38.12
2013	Central American and Caribbean Championships	Morelia, Mexico	3rd	4 × 100 m	39.26
2014	Central American and Caribbean Games	Xalapa, Mexico	4th (h)	100 m	10.46 A (-0.7 m/s)
2014	Central American and Caribbean Games	Xalapa, Mexico	3rd (h)^{*}	200 m	21.33 A (-0.8 m/s)
2015	NACAC Championships	San José, Costa Rica	4th (sf)	100 m	10.25 w (+2.7 m/s)
2015	NACAC Championships	San José, Costa Rica	5th	4 × 100 m	38.90
2016	Olympic Games	Rio de Janeiro, Brazil	6th (h)^{†}	4 × 100 m	37.96
2017	IAAF World Relays	Nassau, Bahamas	1st (B)	4 × 100 m	39.04
2017	IAAF World Relays	Nassau, Bahamas	4th	4 × 200 m	1:21.39
2017	World Championships	London, United Kingdom	27th (h)	100 m	10.25
2017	World Championships	London, United Kingdom	9th (h)	4 × 100 m	38.61
2018	World Indoor Championships	Birmingham, United Kingdom	27th (h)	60 m	6.80
2018	Commonwealth Games	Gold Coast, Australia	23rd (sf)	100 m	10.54
2018	Commonwealth Games	Gold Coast, Australia	–	4 × 100 m	DQ

^{†}: Disqualified in the final.
^{‡}: Did not finish in the final.
^{*}: Disqualified in the semifinal.
