= Candice Davis Price =

American hurdler (born 1985)

Personal information
- Nationality: American
- Born: October 26, 1985 (age 40) Ann Arbor, Michigan

Sport
- Sport: Running
- Event: Hurdles
- College team: USC Trojans

Achievements and titles
- Personal best: 100mH: 12.71 (Carson 2008)
Medal record
Women's athletics
Representing the United States
NACAC Championships
Gold medal – first place	2007 San Salvador	100 m hurdles
World Indoor Championships
Silver medal – second place	2008 Valencia	60 m hurdles

Candice Davis Price (née Davis, born October 26, 1985) is an American hurdler, On Air Personality, and an Performance Coach. She won gold for the 100 meters hurdles during the 2007 NACAC Championships.

A native of Ann Arbor, Michigan, Candice attended Pioneer High School as a student during her adolescent years. She is married and shares 3 kids to her husband, American football player Brian Price.

Known for being a pioneer for women in sports, Candice has paved the way for young girls by launching her own athletic brand, "Wildchild Athletics." Her brand has established one of the first all girls flag football leagues in the United States.

Apart from her work with "Wildchild Athletics," Candice also runs her own media and advisory company called "Catch Candice Media." She often appears on WDIV Local 4 News as a guest/host of their day time talk show "Live in the D."
