= Ayanna Hutchinson =

Trinidadian athletics competitor (born 1978)

Personal information
- Born: 18 February 1978 (age 48) D'Abadie, Tunapuna-Piarco, Trinidad and Tobago

Sport
- Sport: Track and field
Medal record
Athletics
Representing Trinidad and Tobago
Central American and Caribbean Games
| Silver medal – second place | 2010 Mayaguez | 100 m |
CAC Junior Championships (U17)
| Silver medal – second place | 1994 Port of Spain | 100 m |
CARIFTA Games Youth (U17)
| Gold medal – first place | 1994 Bridgetown | 100 m |
| Gold medal – first place | 1994 Bridgetown | 200 m |

Ayanna Hutchinson (born 18 February 1978) is a track and field sprint athlete who competes internationally for Trinidad and Tobago.

== Career ==
Hutchinson represented Trinidad and Tobago at the 2008 Summer Olympics in Beijing. She competed at the 4 × 100 metres relay together with Kelly-Ann Baptiste, Wanda Hutson and Semoy Hackett. In their first round heat they did not finish and were eliminated due to a mistake with the baton exchange.

Ayanna Hutchinson represented Trinidad and Tobago at the 2000 Sydney Olympics where she competed in the 100 m, and the 2004 Athens Olympics as a part of the 4 × 100 m relay team but due to a missed exchange they were eliminated . She was a semi-finalist at the 2006 Commonwealth Games in Melbourne and at the 2009 World Championships in Berlin. Together with Kelly-Ann Baptiste, Semoy Hackett and Reyare Thomas set a national record in the 4 × 100 m at the 2009 Berlin World Championships.

== Achievements ==
Personal Best – Outdoor 100 Metres 11.26; 200 Metres 23.35 Personal Best – Indoor 60 Metres 7.28

Honours 100 Metres 12th IAAF World Championships in Athletics 8 sf 11.58 -0.10 Berlin; 18th Commonwealth Games 5 sf 11.53 -0.30 Melbourne

| Year | Competition | Venue | Position | Event | Notes |
Representing Trinidad and Tobago
| 1994 | CARIFTA Games (U-17) | Bridgetown, Barbados | 1st | 100 m | 11.88 |
| 1994 | CARIFTA Games (U-17) | Bridgetown, Barbados | 1st | 200 m | 24.30 |
| 1994 | CARIFTA Games (U-20) | Bridgetown, Barbados | 4th | 4 × 100 m relay | 46.58 |
| 1994 | Central American and Caribbean Junior Championships (U-17) | Port of Spain, Trinidad and Tobago | 2nd | 100 m | 11.4 (-0.4 m/s) |
| 1994 | Central American and Caribbean Junior Championships (U-17) | Port of Spain, Trinidad and Tobago | 4th | 200 m | 24.9 (-2.3 m/s) |
| 1994 | World Junior Championships | Lisbon, Portugal | 23rd (qf) | 100 m | 11.93 (wind: +1.0 m/s) |
| 1995 | Central American and Caribbean Championships | Guatemala City, Guatemala | 3rd | 4 × 400 m relay | 3:36.29 |
| 1996 | CARIFTA Games (U-20) | Kingston, Jamaica | 5th | 100 m | 11.63 (0.9 m/s) |
| 1996 | CARIFTA Games (U-20) | Kingston, Jamaica | 5th | 200 m | 24.83 (-4.4 m/s) |
| 2000 | Olympic Games | Sydney, Australia | 51st (h) | 100 m | 11.78 (-2.0 m/s) |
| 2004 | South American U23 Championships | Barquisimeto, Venezuela | 3rd | 4 × 100 m relay | 43.89 |
| 2004 | Olympic Games | Athens, Greece | — | 4 × 100 m relay | DNF |
| 2006 | Commonwealth Games | Melbourne, Australia | 5th (sf) | 100 m | 11.53 (wind: -0.3 m/s) |
| 2006 | Central American and Caribbean Games | Cartagena, Colombia | 4th | 100 m | 11.55 (wind: +0.5 m/s) |
| 2007 | NACAC Championships | San Salvador, El Salvador | 7th | 100 m | 11.88 |
| 2007 | NACAC Championships | San Salvador, El Salvador | 3rd | 4 × 100 m relay | 43.98 |
| 2007 | Pan American Games | Rio de Janeiro, Brazil | 14th (sf) | 100 m | 11.77 (0.6 m/s) |
| 2007 | Pan American Games | Rio de Janeiro, Brazil | 7th | 4 × 100 m relay | 44.33 |
| 2008 | Central American and Caribbean Championships | Cali, Colombia | 4th (h) | 100 m | 11.51 (1.3 m/s) |
| 2008 | Central American and Caribbean Championships | Cali, Colombia | 1st | 4 × 100 m relay | 43.43 NR |
| 2008 | Olympic Games | Beijing, PR China | — | 4 × 100 m relay | DNF |
| 2009 | Central American and Caribbean Championships | Havana, Cuba | 4th | 100 m | 11.45 (0.8 m/s) |
| 2009 | Central American and Caribbean Championships | Havana, Cuba | 3rd | 4 × 100 m relay | 43.75 |
| 2009 | World Championships | Berlin, Germany | 16th (sf) | 100 m | 11.58 (-0.1 m/s) |
| 2009 | World Championships | Berlin, Germany | 7th | 4 × 100 m relay | 43.43 |
| 2010 | Central American and Caribbean Games | Mayagüez, Puerto Rico | 2nd | 100 m | 11.47 (0.0 m/s) |
| 2010 | Central American and Caribbean Games | Mayagüez, Puerto Rico | 5th | 4 × 100 m relay | 45.01 |
| 2010 | Commonwealth Games | Delhi, India | 4th (sf) | 100 m | 11.58 |
| 2011 | Central American and Caribbean Championships | Mayagüez, Puerto Rico | 5th | 100 m | 11.56 (0.5 m/s) |
| 2011 | Central American and Caribbean Championships | Mayagüez, Puerto Rico | 1st | 4 × 100 m relay | 43.47 |
