= 2008 Central American and Caribbean Championships in Athletics =

21st Central American and Caribbean Championships in Athletics
- Dates: 4– 6 July. 2008
- Host city: Cali, Colombia
- Venue: Estadio Pedro Grajales
- Level: Senior
- Events: 44
- Participation: 383 athletes from 30 (+ 3 guest nations) nations
- Records set: 6 Championship records

The 2008 Central American and Caribbean Championships in Athletics were held at the Estadio Pedro Grajales in Cali, Colombia between 4–6 July 2008. A total of 44 events were contested, of which 22 by male and 22 by female athletes. During the three-day competition, six championship records were broken. The competition took place at almost 1000 m above sea level, a factor which helps athletic performance in some events.

Cuba took the most medals overall, winning 34 medals – half of which were gold. The hosts Colombia were the next best with 8 golds and 24 medals altogether, shortly followed by Trinidad and Tobago. Guest athletes took part in some events, but their performances were excluded from the medal tally.

Championship records were broken in both triple jump events; by Mabel Gay in the women's event and Leevan Sands in the men's. The championships also saw four national records broken in competition. Two athletes topped the podium twice: Rosibel García completed the 800 metres/1500 metres double, while Indira Terrero won in the 400 metres sprint and relay races. Bertha Sánchez, representing the hosts, took the 10,000 metres title, but just missed out on a second gold, winning the silver in the 5000 metres. Bahamian Shamar Sands showed multi-event ability by winning the 110 metres hurdles gold medal, as well as helping his country to the 100 m relay silver medal.

== Records ==
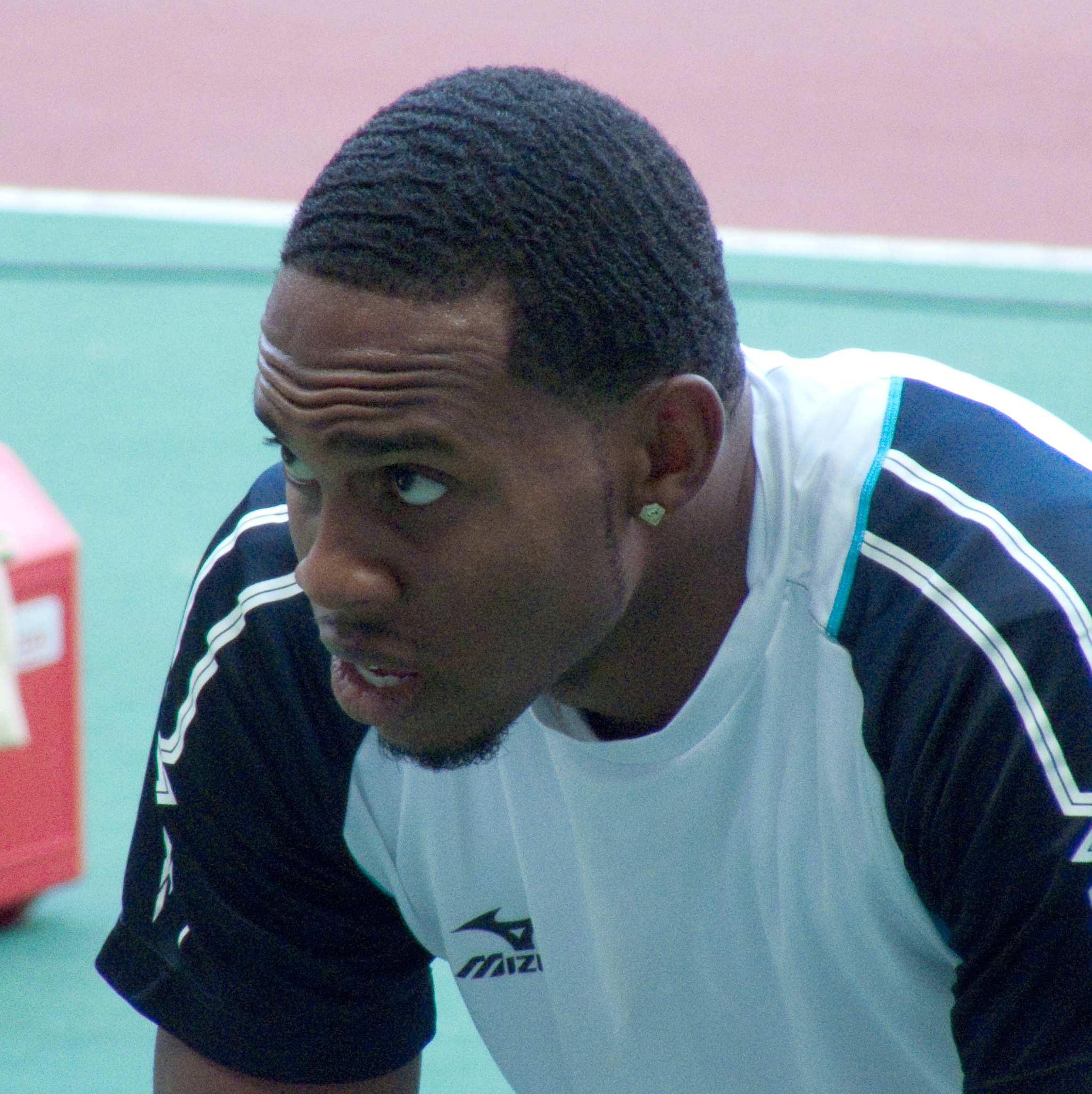
Leevan Sands (above) broke the men's triple jump record

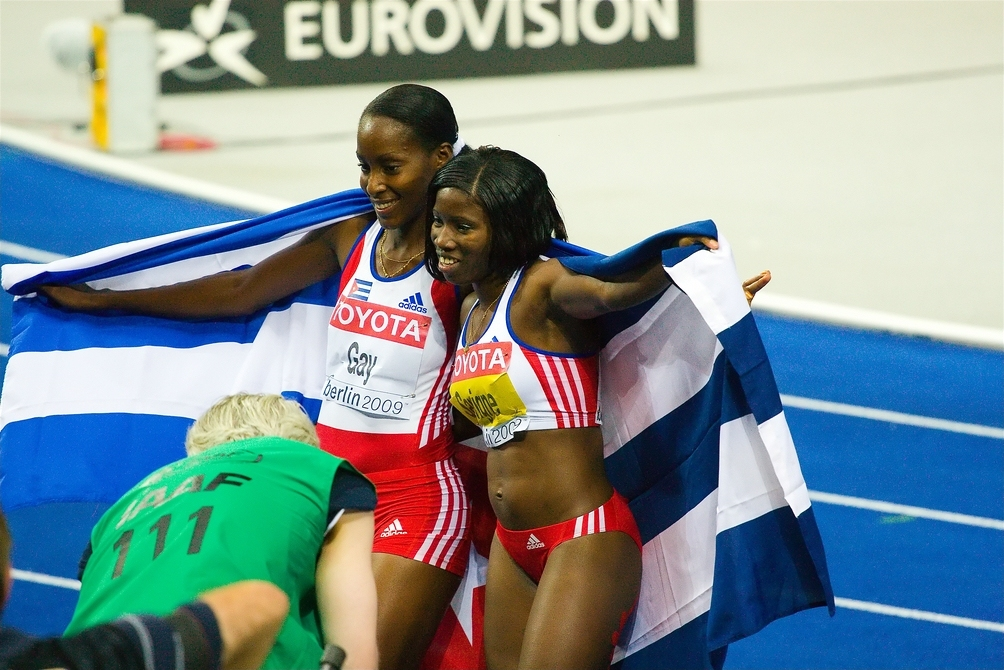
Mabel Gay (left) broke the women's triple jump record

Name	Event	Country	Record	Type
Andy González	800 metres	Cuba	1:46.11	CR
Wilfredo Martínez	Long jump	Cuba	8.31 m	CR
Leevan Sands	Triple jump	Bahamas	17.29 m	CR
Jefferson Pérez	20000 m walk (track)	Ecuador	1:20:54.9	CR
Anay Tejeda	100 metres hurdles	Cuba	12.61	CR NR
Aleesha Barber	100 metres hurdles	Trinidad and Tobago	12.98	NR
Semoy Hackett; Ayanna Hutchinson; Sasha Springer-Jones; Kelly-Ann Baptiste	4×100 metre relay	Trinidad and Tobago	43.43	NR
Mabel Gay	Triple jump	Cuba	14.19 m	CR
Candice Scott	Hammer throw	Trinidad and Tobago	69.26	CR
Eli Johana Moreno	Hammer throw	Colombia	67.09	NR

Key:	WR — World record • AR — Area record • CR — Championship record • NR — National record

== Medal summary ==
=== Men ===
Event	Gold		Silver		Bronze	
100 metres	Darrel Brown (TRI)	10.12	Daniel Bailey (ATG)	10.18	Henry Vizcaíno (CUB)	10.34
200 metres	Emmanuel Callender (TRI)	20.69	Rondel Sorrillo (TRI)	20.71	José Acevedo (VEN)	20.79
400 metres	Renny Quow (TRI)	45.27	Michael Mathieu (BAH)	45.66	Omar Cisneros (CUB)	45.98
800 metres	Andy González (CUB)	1:46.11 CR	Eduard Villanueva (VEN)	1:46.92	Juan Pablo Solares (MEX)	1:47.18
1500 metres	Isaías Haro (MEX)	3:45.15	Nico José Herrera (VEN)	3:45.39	Maury Surel Castillo (CUB)	3:47.17
5000 metres	John Tello (COL)	14:21.21	Isaías Haro (MEX)	14:35.81	Javier Alexander Guarín (COL)	15:10.58
10,000 metres	William Naranjo (COL)	29:30.29	Diego Colorado (COL)	29:41.88	Only two finishers	
110 metre hurdles	Shamar Sands (BAH)	13.32w	Paulo César Villar (COL)	13.45w	Héctor Cotto (PUR)	13.55w
400 metre hurdles	Isa Phillips (JAM)	49.98	Yasmany Copello (CUB)	50.08	Yeison Rivas (COL)	50.44
3000 metre steeplechase	José Alberto Sánchez (CUB)	8:53.24	Alexander Greaux (PUR)	9:12.70	Yovanni Adame (DOM)	9:15.72
High jump	Víctor Moya (CUB)	2.25 m	Trevor Barry (BAH)	2.25 m	Jamal Wilson (BAH)	2.13 m
Pole vault	Lázaro Eduardo Borges (CUB)	5.50 m	Dominic Johnson (LCA)	5.30 m	Natanael Semeis (DOM)	4.80 m
Long jump	Wilfredo Martínez (CUB)	8.31 m CR	Herbert McGregor (JAM)	7.90 m	Tyrone Smith (BER)	7.80 m
Triple jump	Leevan Sands (BAH)	17.29 m CR	Héctor Dairo Fuentes (CUB)	17.23 m	Alexis Copello (CUB)	16.91 m
Shot put	Alexis Paumier (CUB)	19.60 m	Manuel Repollet (PUR)	18.43 m	Carlos Jovanny García (COL)	17.70 m
Discus throw	Jorge Fernández (CUB)	58.60 m	Yunio Lastre (CUB)	58.00 m	Jesús Parejo (VEN)	56.49 m
Hammer throw	Noleysi Vicet (CUB)	71.61 m	Luis Martín García (MEX)	66.36 m	Raúl Rivera (GUA)	64.58 m
Javelin throw	Anier Boué (CUB)	74.98 m	Dayron Márquez (COL)	74.37 m	Johnny Walter Viáfara (COL)	71.07 m
Decathlon	Yosley Azcuy (CUB)	7408 pts	Steven Marrero (PUR)	7297 pts	Andrés Horacio Mantilla (COL)	7164 pts
20000 m track walk †	James Rendón (COL)	1:25:22.7	Allan Segura (CRC)	1:27:57.2	Claudio Erasmo Vargas (MEX)	1:28:51.6
4×100 metres relay	Trinidad and Tobago (TRI); Keston Bledman; Marc Burns; Aaron Armstrong; Richard Thompson	38.54	Bahamas (BAH); Adrian Griffith; Derrick Atkins; Rodney Green; Shamar Sands	39.22	Saint Kitts and Nevis (SKN); Jason Rogers; Larry Inanga; Jevon Claxton; Delwayne Delaney	40.81
4×400 metres relay	Cuba (CUB); William Collazo; Yunier Pérez; Omar Cisneros; Yeimer López	3:02.10	Bahamas (BAH); Ramon Miller; Michael Mathieu; Avard Moncur; Andretti Bain	3:02.48	Trinidad and Tobago (TRI); Renny Quow; Cowin Mills; Ade Alleyne-Forte; Stann Waithe	3:04.12

- † The 20 km racewalk event was won by Jefferson Pérez of Ecuador, who was competing as a guest athlete.

=== Women ===
Event	Gold		Silver		Bronze	
100 metres	Chandra Sturrup (BAH)	11.20	Sherry Fletcher (GRN)	11.39	Barbara Pierre (HAI)	11.40
200 metres	Debbie Ferguson-McKenzie (BAH)	22.78	Roxana Díaz (CUB)	22.82	Darlenys Obregón (COL)	23.13
400 metres	Indira Terrero (CUB)	50.98	Gabriela Medina (MEX)	51.78	Ginou Ettiene (HAI)	52.20
800 metres	Rosibel García (COL)	2:05.9	Sheena Gooding (BAR)	2:06.6	Cristina Guevara (MEX)	2:07.2
1500 metres	Rosibel García (COL)	4:24.62	Yamilé Alaluf (MEX)	4:25.43	Muriel Coneo (COL)	4:28.92
5000 metres	Nora Leticia Rocha (MEX)	16:41.27	Bertha Sánchez (COL)	16:43.82	María Isabel Montilla (VEN)	16:53.42
10,000 metres	Bertha Sánchez (COL)	35:16.36	María Isabel Montilla (VEN)	35:42.18	Andreina de la Rosa (DOM)	36:43.36
100 metres hurdles	Anay Tejeda (CUB)	12.61 CR NR	Yenima Arencibia (CUB)	12.95	Aleesha Barber (TRI)	12.98
400 metres hurdles	Josanne Lucas (TRI)	56.55	Princesa Oliveros (COL)	57.44	Yolanda Osana (DOM)	58.91
3000 metres steeplechase	Ángela Figueroa (COL)	10:18.23	Milena Pérez (CUB)	10:45.46	Sonny García (DOM)	12:16.51
High jump	Levern Spencer (LCA)	1.91 m	Caterine Ibargüen (COL)	1.88 m	Marierlis Rojas (VEN)	1.79 m
Pole vault	Milena Jazmín Agudelo (COL)	4.10 m	Keisa Monterola (VEN)	4.00 m	Only two competitors	
Long jump	Bianca Stuart (BAH)	6.54 m	Shara Proctor (AIA)	6.54 m NR	Charisse Bacchus (TRI)	6.49 m
Triple jump	Mabel Gay (CUB)	14.19 m CR	Yarianna Martínez (CUB)	13.95 m	Ayanna Alexander (TRI)	13.30 m
Shot put	Cleopatra Borel-Brown (TRI)	18.39 m	Yumileidi Cumbá (CUB)	18.10 m	Yaniuvis López (CUB)	17.87 m
Discus throw	Yarelis Barrios (CUB)	62.87 m	Yania Ferrales (CUB)	58.74 m	Annie Alexander (TRI)	54.56 m
Hammer throw	Candice Scott (TRI)	69.26 m CR	Yunaika Crawford (CUB)	69.03 m	Johana Moreno (COL)	67.09 m NR
Javelin throw	Laverne Eve (BAH)	56.36 m	Yanet Cruz (CUB)	56.14 m	Kateema Riettie (JAM)	54.90 m
Heptathlon	Yarianny Argüelles (CUB)	5862 pts	Yasmiany Pedroso (CUB)	5833 pts	Thaimara Solsiree Rivas (VEN)	5302 pts
10000 m track walk	Claudia Ortega (MEX)	50:10.37	Milángela Rosales (VEN)	51:06.83	Ingrid Hernández (COL)	52:44.84
4×100 metres relay ††	Trinidad and Tobago (TRI); Semoy Hackett; Ayanna Hutchinson; Sasha Springer-Jones; Kelly-Ann Baptiste	43.43 NR	Colombia (COL); Mirtha Brock; Felipa Palacios; Darlenys Obregón; Yomara Hinestroza	43.56	Bahamas (BAH); Kristy White; Chandra Sturrup; Tamicka Clarke; Debbie Ferguson-McKenzie	44.03
4×400 metres relay †††	Cuba (CUB); Aymée Martínez; Diosmely Peña; Daisurami Bonne; Indira Terrero	3:27.97	Mexico (MEX); María Teresa Rugeio; Gabriela Medina; Nallely Vela; Zudikey Rodríguez	3:29.94	Bahamas (BAH); Sasha Rolle; Christine Amertil; Shakeitha Henfield; Crystal Strachan	3:35.57

- †† A Brazilian team of Rosemar Coelho Neto, Lucimar de Moura, Thaissa Presti and Franciela Krasucki took third place in the 4×100 m relay, but they were competing as guest athletes.
- ††† A Brazilian team of Maria Laura Almirão, Lucimar Teodoro, Josiane Tito and Emmily Pinheiro took second place in the 4×400 m relay, but they were competing as guest athletes.

== Medal table ==
* Host nation (Colombia)

Rank	Nation	Gold	Silver	Bronze	Total
1	Cuba	17	12	5	34
2	Colombia*	8	7	9	24
3	Trinidad and Tobago	8	1	5	14
4	Bahamas	6	4	3	13
5	Mexico	3	5	3	11
6	Jamaica	1	1	1	3
7	Saint Lucia	1	1	0	2
8	Venezuela	0	5	5	10
9	Puerto Rico	0	3	1	4
10	Anguilla	0	1	0	1
10	Antigua and Barbuda	0	1	0	1
10	Barbados	0	1	0	1
10	Costa Rica	0	1	0	1
10	Grenada	0	1	0	1
15	Dominican Republic	0	0	5	5
16	Haiti	0	0	2	2
17	Bermuda	0	0	1	1
17	Guatemala	0	0	1	1
17	Saint Kitts and Nevis	0	0	1	1
Totals (19 entries)		44	44	42	130

== Participating nations ==
- Antigua and Barbuda (3)
- Aruba (1)
- Bahamas (34)
- Barbados (10)
- Bermuda (6)
- Brazil* (8)
- British Virgin Islands (2)
- Cayman Islands (7)
- Chile* (2)
- Colombia (54)
- Costa Rica (1)
- Cuba (41)
- Dominica (7)
- Dominican Republic (27)
- Ecuador* (1)
- Grenada (5)
- Guatemala (11)
- Guyana (4)
- Haiti (6)
- Honduras (2)
- Jamaica (17)
- Mexico (26)
- Netherlands Antilles (1)
- Nicaragua (3)
- Panama (2)
- Puerto Rico (24)
- El Salvador (4)
- Saint Kitts and Nevis (10)
- Saint Lucia (4)
- Saint Vincent and the Grenadines (5)
- Trinidad and Tobago (27)
- United States Virgin Islands (6)
- Venezuela (22)

* Guest nations
