= Mechelle Lewis =

Athletics competitor

Mechelle Lewis Freeman OLY
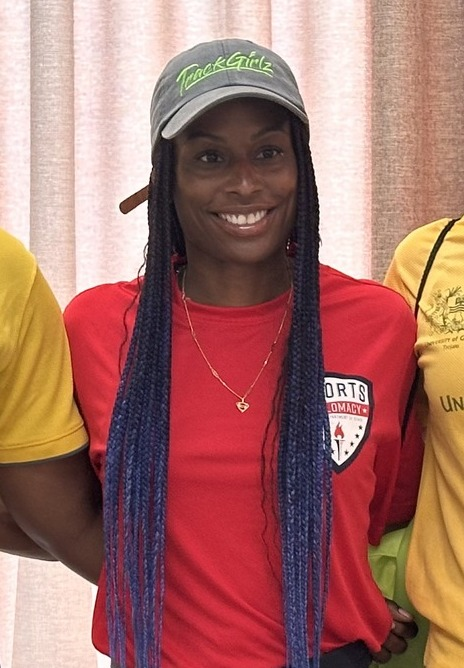

Personal information
- Nationality: United States
- Born: Mechelle Chanai Lewis; September 20, 1980 (age 45) Fort Washington, Maryland
- Height: 5 ft 6 in (168 cm)

Sport
- Sport: Running
- Events: 100 m and 4 × 100 m
Medal record
Women's athletics
Representing the United States
World Championships
Gold medal – first place	2007 Osaka	4 × 100 m
Pan American Games
Silver medal – second place	2007 Rio de Janeiro	100 m
Silver medal – second place	2007 Rio de Janeiro	4 × 100 m relay

Mechelle Chanai Lewis Freeman (born September 20, 1980) is an American retired track and field athlete who specialized in the 100 meters and 4 × 100 meter relay. Mechelle, an Oxon Hill, Maryland native, was a 2007 Pan American double silver medalist, 2007 World Champion and 2008 USA Olympian.

Lewis represented the United States at the 2008 Summer Olympic Games in Beijing, China. She competed on the 4 × 100 meter relay together with Angela Williams, Torri Edwards and Lauryn Williams. In their first round heat they were however disqualified and eliminated.

== Younger Years ==
Born in Washington, D.C. to Eddie and Chandra Lewis, and raised in Fort Washington, Maryland, Mechelle is the youngest of a set of twin girls. Both were highly active and successful in sports at a young age taking on basketball and soccer. They spent their summers competing in AAU basketball tournaments and their fall seasons winning soccer championships for the Oxon Hill Boys & Girls Club. Ironically however, after easily winning all of her events at a track meet held during her 8th grade P.E. class, Mechelle was approached by a high school scout who told her that she should look into taking on track and field. Once in high school, Mechelle and her sister would make one of the most significant decisions in their lives and decided to quit basketball to begin their Track & Field career.

== High school ==
Mechelle really came into her own as an athlete at Oxon Hill High School. Lettering in both soccer and track, the decision to take running seriously would propel her to becoming a Maryland state record holder, where she held the state record in the 55m for 3 years with a time of 6.94s. Mechelle was also the 300 m regional champion and the MVP of her high school indoor and outdoor track team three years in a row. She made the Prince George's County All-County Team three years as well as the All-Metropolitan team, representing the best select few athletes in the Maryland, DC, and Northern Virginia area. Her high school track team was third in the county three times and finished in the top three twice at the state championships. Mechelle's 4 × 400 m relay team won the state title three consecutive years and came in third at the National High School Indoor Track & Field Championships in 1997. With nationally recognized success, Mechelle also brought home championships competing in the USATF Junior Olympics for the Rising Stars track club. Mechelle kept busy off the track as well, winning Homecoming queen her senior year and operating in her role as the Senior Class Vice President. She also enjoyed playing in the band, mastering both the flute and the oboe. After going through a rigorous process of elimination, both Mechelle and her sister chose to run track at the University of South Carolina where they both received full scholarships to do so.

== College Years ==
Lewis attended the University of South Carolina, from 1998 to 2004 where she obtained her bachelor's degree and master's degrees in Mass Communications. She was a three-time All-American athlete in the 60 m, 200 m, and the 4 × 100 m relay. She held the school record in the 55m for two years with a time of 6.84s. Mechelle also competed on the team that brought the first national championship in any sport to her school when her team won the 2002 Track & Field Outdoor Championships. She accompanied the team to the White House to meet President Bush for the honor. In the classroom, Lewis received the Highest GPA honor in her freshman class at the University of South Carolina with a 4.0 GPA and went on to graduate with honors. She was also honored as one of the 2002 "Top 25 Most Promising Minority Students" in the country from the American Advertising Federation during her senior year.

== After College ==
Mechelle graduated from college cum laude with a 3.6 GPA, and from graduate school with a 3.8 GPA. After experiencing several injuries in college, she left sports to pursue a business career. She moved to New York City and worked at one of the world's top advertising agencies, Young & Rubicam, serving Xerox and the United Negro College Fund.

After two years at Young & Rubicam, Mechelle decided to return her focus to track and field; she relocated to North Carolina to begin a fully committed training regimen. Although briefly sidelined by further injuries, Mechelle rebounded and went on to become a 2007 Pan American double silver medalist, 2007 World Champion, and 2008 Olympian.

== USA Track & Field ==
=== 2008 Olympics ===
Sponsored by Nike, Xerox, Lifestyle Family Fitness and Young & Rubicam in the 2008 Beijing Olympics, Lewis competed in the 4 × 100 m with USA teammates Angela Williams, Torri Edwards and Lauryn Williams. However, they were disqualified after a missed hand-off in the semifinal between teammates Torri Edwards and Lauryn Williams.

=== 2010 USATF Annual Meeting ===
In December, Mechelle was elected to serve as the USATF Elite Athlete Communications Liaison, as well as the USATF Athletes Advisory Committee Women's Sprints Event Leader. Mechelle is excited about her new role as she gears up for the 2011 season.

== Off the Track ==
Outside of track & field, Mechelle uses her platform, Do It Afraid!, to encourage individuals to recognize their self-worth and move forward in life facing their fears head on. Mechelle is also involved with Athletes for Hope. She enjoys hosting and speaking at events, participating in fitness clinics, and advocating for healthy-living awareness.

Her mission is to enable individuals to be transformed throughout their mind, body and spirit by providing essential knowledge and exposure to prepare individuals to live overall healthy lives. Mechelle is also a certified Zumba Instructor.

In addition, she founded the non-profit TrackGirlz, a 501c3 to promote mentorship to girls through track and field, in 2015.

== Achievements ==
=== Personal bests ===
Event	Time (seconds)	Venue	Date
100 meters	10.97	Eugene, Oregon, United States	June 27, 2008
200 meters	23.01	Provo, Utah	May 24, 2008
400 meters	55.72	Shanghai, China	September 20, 2008
50 meters	6.32	Lievin, France	February 10, 2009
60 meters	7.23	Düsseldorf, Germany	February 13, 2009

- All information from IAAF Profile

=== Competition record ===
Year	Tournament	Venue	Event	Result	Notes
2007	World Championships	Osaka, Japan	4 × 100 meter	1st	
2007	2007 Pan American Games	Rio de Janeiro, Brazil	100 meter	2nd	
2007	2007 Pan American Games	Rio de Janeiro, Brazil	4 × 100 meter	2nd	
2008	Olympic Games	Beijing, China	4 × 100 meter	Disqualified	

== See also ==
- World Fit
