= Peta-Gaye Dowdie =

Jamaican sprinter

Personal information
- Born: 18 January 1977 (age 49) Saint Elizabeth Parish, Jamaica

Sport
- Club: LSU Tigers
Medal record
Womes's Athletics
Representing Jamaica
World Championships
| Bronze medal – third place | 1999 Seville | 4x100 m relay |
Pan American Games
| Gold medal – first place | 1999 Winnipeg | 4x100 m relay |
| Gold medal – first place | 2007 Rio de Janeiro | 4x100 m relay |
| Bronze medal – third place | 1999 Winnipeg | 100 m |
Commonwealth Games
| Gold medal – first place | 2006 Melbourne | 4x100 m relay |

Peta-Gaye Dowdie (born 18 January 1977) is a Jamaican sprinter. As a member of the Jamaican sprint relay team she won a bronze medal at the 1999 World Championships and gold medals at the 2006 Commonwealth Games and 2007 Pan American Games.

Dowdie ran for St. Jago High School and then ran track collegiately at Louisiana State University. She was controversially replaced by Merlene Ottey on the Jamaican 2000 Olympic 100 metres team, despite Dowdie beating Ottey at the Jamaican trials.
