= 2009 Central American and Caribbean Championships in Athletics – Results =

These are the official results of the 2009 Central American and Caribbean Championships in Athletics which took place on July 3–7, 2009 in Havana, Cuba.

Note: Although each country could only have two representatives, Cuba, as the host, could also enter additional athletes. Their performances, however, were not eligible for medals at the competition. Results of such athletes are given below all others.

== Men's results ==
=== 100 meters ===
Heats – July 3
Wind:
Heat 1: 0.0 m/s, Heat 2: +0.1 m/s, Heat 3: -0.8 m/s, Heat 4: 0.0 m/s

Rank	Heat	Name	Nationality	Time	Notes
1	2	Emmanuel Callender	Trinidad and Tobago	10.22	Q
2	2	Lerone Clarke	Jamaica	10.25	q
3	4	Keston Bledman	Trinidad and Tobago	10.31	Q
4	2	Andrew Hinds	Barbados	10.32	q
5	3	Michael Herrera	Cuba	10.34	Q
6	4	David Lescay	Cuba	10.36	q
7	4	Kwayne Fisher	Jamaica	10.39	q
8	1	Adrian Griffith	Bahamas	10.40	Q
9	3	Ramon Gittens	Barbados	10.41	
10	4	Kemar Hyman	Cayman Islands	10.42	
11	2	Yavid Zackey	Puerto Rico	10.44	
12	1	Andon Mitchell	Grenada	10.45	
13	2	David Walters	United States Virgin Islands	10.46	
14	1	Adrian Durant	United States Virgin Islands	10.53	
14	3	Tyrell Cuffy	Cayman Islands	10.53	
16	1	Carlos Jorge	Dominican Republic	10.54	
17	4	Miguel López	Puerto Rico	10.55	
17	4	Joel Báez	Dominican Republic	10.55	
19	3	Shanon King	Antigua and Barbuda	10.58	
20	3	Delwayne Delaney	Saint Kitts and Nevis	10.62	
21	2	Rodney Greene	Bahamas	10.67	
22	2	Jason Rogers	Saint Kitts and Nevis	10.68	
23	1	Marvin Bien-Aime	Haiti	10.74	
24	4	Roudy Monrose	Haiti	10.75	
25	3	Harold Houston	Bermuda	10.86	
26	1	Nygell Domfries	Netherlands Antilles	11.04	

Final – July 3
Wind:
+0.1 m/s

Rank	Lane	Name	Nationality	Time	Notes
1st place, gold medalist(s)	4	Emmanuel Callender	Trinidad and Tobago	10.08	PB
2nd place, silver medalist(s)	2	Lerone Clarke	Jamaica	10.08	PB
3rd place, bronze medalist(s)	7	Andrew Hinds	Barbados	10.12	
4	8	Kwayne Fisher	Jamaica	10.27	
5	6	Adrian Griffith	Bahamas	10.29	
6	5	Keston Bledman	Trinidad and Tobago	10.29	
7	3	Michael Herrera	Cuba	10.31	
8	1	David Lescay	Cuba	10.33	

=== 200 meters ===
Heats – July 5
Wind:
Heat 1: -0.3 m/s, Heat 2: +0.5 m/s, Heat 3: -0.5 m/s, Heat 4: -0.2 m/s

Rank	Heat	Name	Nationality	Time	Notes
1	1	Nickel Ashmeade	Jamaica	20.64	Q
2	1	Yunier Pérez	Cuba	20.75	q
3	4	Rondel Sorrillo	Trinidad and Tobago	20.85	Q
4	3	Ramone McKenzie	Jamaica	20.90	Q
5	1	Karlton Rolle	Bahamas	20.96	q
6	4	Michael Mathieu	Bahamas	21.06	q
7	4	Tyrell Cuffy	Cayman Islands	21.06	q
8	3	Ramon Gittens	Barbados	21.07	
8	4	Tabarie Henry	United States Virgin Islands	21.07	
10	3	Emmanuel Callender	Trinidad and Tobago	21.10	
11	2	Andon Mitchell	Grenada	21.17	Q
12	2	Kemar Hyman	Cayman Islands	21.23	
13	1	Gustavo Cuesta	Dominican Republic	21.28	
14	4	Rachmill van Lamoen	Netherlands Antilles	21.37	
15	1	Roudy Monrose	Haiti	21.38	
16	4	Yavid Zackey	Puerto Rico	21.43	
17	2	Miguel López	Puerto Rico	21.45	
18	3	Marvin Bien-Aime	Haiti	21.51	
19	2	Harold Houston	Bermuda	21.69	
20	4	Delwayne Delaney	Saint Kitts and Nevis	21.70	
21	1	Jason Rogers	Saint Kitts and Nevis	21.85	
22	2	Alvaro Cassiani	Venezuela	21.96	
23	3	Dursley Riman	Netherlands Antilles	22.10	
24	3	José Carlos Herrera	Mexico	22.16	
25	2	Víctor Cantillano	Costa Rica	22.32	
	2	Calvin Dascent	United States Virgin Islands	DNF	
	3	José González	Costa Rica	DNF	
	1	Kevin Fahie	British Virgin Islands	DNS	
	3	Joseph Morales	Honduras	DNS	
	4	Roberto Skyers	Cuba	DNS	

Final – July 5
Wind:
-1.1 m/s

Rank	Lane	Name	Nationality	Time	Notes
1st place, gold medalist(s)	4	Nickel Ashmeade	Jamaica	20.54	
2nd place, silver medalist(s)	5	Rondel Sorrillo	Trinidad and Tobago	20.72	
3rd place, bronze medalist(s)	3	Ramone McKenzie	Jamaica	20.74	
4	2	Yunier Pérez	Cuba	20.83	
5	8	Tyrell Cuffy	Cayman Islands	20.93	
6	1	Michael Mathieu	Bahamas	21.10	
7	7	Karlton Rolle	Bahamas	21.14	
8	6	Andon Mitchell	Grenada	21.46	

=== 400 meters ===
Heats – July 3

Rank	Heat	Name	Nationality	Time	Notes
1	1	Arismendy Peguero	Dominican Republic	45.74	Q
2	2	William Collazo	Cuba	45.96	Q
3	1	Dane Hyatt	Jamaica	46.09	Q
4	3	Héctor Carrasquillo	Puerto Rico	46.40	Q
5	3	Nery Brenes	Costa Rica	46.49	Q
6	1	Freddy Mezones	Venezuela	46.61	q
7	3	Yoel Tapia	Dominican Republic	46.64	q
8	2	Geiner Mosquera	Colombia	46.69	Q
9	2	Jarrin Solomon	Trinidad and Tobago	46.89	
10	3	Leford Green	Jamaica	47.11	
11	1	Andretti Bain	Bahamas	47.23	
12	2	Aaron Cleare	Bahamas	47.35	
13	1	Obed Martis	Netherlands Antilles	47.61	
14	3	Jovon Toppin	Trinidad and Tobago	47.75	
15	3	Noel Ruíz	Cuba	47.92	
16	2	Albert Bravo	Venezuela	48.00	
17	3	John Valoyes	Colombia	48.13	
18	2	José Carlos Herrera	Mexico	48.25	
19	2	Víctor Cantillano	Costa Rica	48.32	
20	1	Pedro Suazo	Honduras	49.59	
21	1	Camilo Quevedo	Guatemala	49.82	
22	3	Hans Villagrán	Guatemala	50.41	
	2	Terrence Agard	Netherlands Antilles	DNS	

Final – July 3

Rank	Lane	Name	Nationality	Time	Notes
1st place, gold medalist(s)	5	William Collazo	Cuba	44.96	
2nd place, silver medalist(s)	6	Dane Hyatt	Jamaica	45.57	
3rd place, bronze medalist(s)	4	Arismendy Peguero	Dominican Republic	45.62	
4	2	Nery Brenes	Costa Rica	45.92	
5	2	Héctor Carrasquillo	Puerto Rico	45.94	
6	7	Geiner Mosquera	Colombia	46.08	
7	8	Yoel Tapia	Dominican Republic	46.50	
8	1	Freddy Mezones	Venezuela	47.39	

=== 800 meters ===
Heats – July 4

Rank	Heat	Name	Nationality	Time	Notes
1	1	Yeimer López	Cuba	1:49.21	Q
2	1	Ricardo Cunningham	Jamaica	1:49.28	Q
3	1	Nico Herrera	Venezuela	1:49.30	Q
4	1	Gavyn Nero	Trinidad and Tobago	1:49.55	q
5	1	José Esparza	Mexico	1:49.55	q
6	2	Andy González	Cuba	1:51.51	Q
7	2	Aaron Evans	Bermuda	1:51.77	Q
8	2	Tayron Reyes	Dominican Republic	1:51.91	Q
9	2	Marco Vinicio Pérez	Costa Rica	1:52.15	
10	2	Terry Charles	United States Virgin Islands	1:52.43	
11	1	Arnoldo Monge	Costa Rica	1:57.97	
	2	David Freeman	Puerto Rico	DNS	
	2	Eduar Villanueva	Venezuela	DNS	
	1	Raidel Acea*	Cuba	DNS	

Final – July 5

Rank	Name	Nationality	Time	Notes
1st place, gold medalist(s)	Yeimer López	Cuba	1:45.56	
2nd place, silver medalist(s)	Andy González	Cuba	1:46.62	
3rd place, bronze medalist(s)	Gavyn Nero	Trinidad and Tobago	1:47.51	
4	Ricardo Cunningham	Jamaica	1:47.98	
5	Nico Herrera	Venezuela	1:48.43	
6	Tayron Reyes	Dominican Republic	1:50.65	
7	José Esparza	Mexico	1:51.05	
8	Aaron Evans	Bermuda	2:05.28	

=== 1500 meters ===
July 4

Rank	Name	Nationality	Time	Notes
1st place, gold medalist(s)	Eduar Villanueva	Venezuela	3:42.23	
2nd place, silver medalist(s)	Maury Surel Castillo	Cuba	3:42.49	
3rd place, bronze medalist(s)	José Rivera	Puerto Rico	3:42.86	
4	José Esparza	Mexico	3:42.87	
5	Nico Herrera	Venezuela	3:44.66	
6	Erick Rodríguez	Nicaragua	4:00.59	
7	Arniel Osorio	Cuba	4:22.68	
	Yender Plutín*	Cuba	3:56.54	
	David Freeman	Puerto Rico	DNF	

=== 5000 meters ===
July 5

Rank	Name	Nationality	Time	Notes
1st place, gold medalist(s)	José Alberto Sánchez	Cuba	14:23.73	
2nd place, silver medalist(s)	Teodoro Vega	Mexico	14:28.06	
3rd place, bronze medalist(s)	Denides Vélez	Puerto Rico	14:34.48	
4	Jeremias Saloj	Guatemala	14:43.54	
5	O'Niel Williams	Bahamas	16:26.68	
	Leonardo Morales*	Cuba	14:32.92	
	Jacinto Milanés*	Cuba	14:58.41	
	Maury Surel Castillo	Cuba	DQ	
	José Amado García	Guatemala	DNS	

=== 10,000 meters ===
July 3

Rank	Name	Nationality	Time	Notes
1st place, gold medalist(s)	Liván Luque	Cuba	29:55.16	
2nd place, silver medalist(s)	Henry Jaens	Cuba	30:08.76	
3rd place, bronze medalist(s)	Teodoro Vega	Mexico	30:13.21	
4	Jeremias Saloj	Guatemala	32:24.60	
	Yausvel Arboláez*	Cuba	30:41.79	
	Jacinto Milanés*	Cuba	33:00.66	
	Leonardo Morales*	Cuba	DNF	
	José Amado García	Guatemala	DNS	

=== Half marathon ===
July 5

Rank	Name	Nationality	Time	Notes
1st place, gold medalist(s)	Henry Jaens	Cuba	1:06:32	
2nd place, silver medalist(s)	Liván Luque	Cuba	1:07:26	
3rd place, bronze medalist(s)	Sean Trott	Bermuda	1:19:16	
4	Mark Greenidge	Barbados	1:21:35	
	Kevin Smith	Bermuda	DNF	

=== 110 meters hurdles ===
Heats – July 3
Wind:
Heat 1: -0.3 m/s, Heat 2: -0.6 m/s

Rank	Heat	Name	Nationality	Time	Notes
1	1	Ryan Brathwaite	Barbados	13.43	Q, CR
2	2	Dayron Robles	Cuba	13.47	Q
3	1	Dayron Capetillo	Cuba	13.61	Q
4	1	Héctor Cotto	Puerto Rico	13.81	Q
5	2	Eric Keddo	Jamaica	13.92	Q
6	2	Dominique Degrammont	Haiti	14.17	Q
7	2	Ramón Sosa	Dominican Republic	14.33	q
8	2	Emilio Estrada	Mexico	15.14	q
	1	Ignacio Morales*	Cuba	DQ	
	1	Yuniel Hernández*	Cuba	DNS	

Final – July 3
Wind:
+2.5 m/s

Rank	Lane	Name	Nationality	Time	Notes
1st place, gold medalist(s)	5	Dayron Robles	Cuba	13.18	
2nd place, silver medalist(s)	4	Ryan Brathwaite	Barbados	13.31	
3rd place, bronze medalist(s)	3	Dayron Capetillo	Cuba	13.39	
4	2	Héctor Cotto	Puerto Rico	13.63	
5	6	Eric Keddo	Jamaica	13.67	
6	7	Dominique Degrammont	Haiti	14.15	
7	1	Ramón Sosa	Dominican Republic	14.32	
8	8	Emilio Estrada	Mexico	15.08	

=== 400 meters hurdles ===
Heats – July 4

Rank	Heat	Name	Nationality	Time	Notes
1	2	Javier Culson	Puerto Rico	49.40	Q
2	1	Félix Sánchez	Dominican Republic	49.55	Q
3	1	Omar Cisneros	Cuba	49.75	Q
4	2	Yasmani Copello	Cuba	50.08	Q
5	2	Jehue Gordon	Trinidad and Tobago	50.13	Q
6	1	Yeison Rivas	Colombia	50.66	Q
7	1	Leslie Murray	United States Virgin Islands	50.92	q
8	1	Emmanuel Mayers	Trinidad and Tobago	51.04	q
9	2	Alie Beauvais	Haiti	51.54	
10	1	Allan Ayala	Guatemala	51.89	
11	2	Carlyle Thompson	Bahamas	52.01	
12	2	Winder Cuevas	Dominican Republic	52.78	
13	2	Camilo Quevedo	Guatemala	53.16	
	2	Josef Robertson	Jamaica	DNF	
	1	Jonathon Williams	Belize	DNS	
	1	Junior Hines	Cayman Islands	DNS	

Final – July 5

Rank	Lane	Name	Nationality	Time	Notes
1st place, gold medalist(s)	4	Javier Culson	Puerto Rico	48.51	CR
2nd place, silver medalist(s)	5	Félix Sánchez	Dominican Republic	48.85	
3rd place, bronze medalist(s)	2	Jehue Gordon	Trinidad and Tobago	49.45	
4	3	Omar Cisneros	Cuba	49.99	
5	6	Yasmani Copello	Cuba	50.09	
6	7	Yeison Rivas	Colombia	50.14	
7	8	Emmanuel Mayers	Trinidad and Tobago	51.63	
	1	Leslie Murray	United States Virgin Islands	DNS	

=== 3000 meters steeplechase ===
July 4

Rank	Name	Nationality	Time	Notes
1st place, gold medalist(s)	José Alberto Sánchez	Cuba	8:30.08	CR
2nd place, silver medalist(s)	José Peña	Venezuela	8:51.03	
3rd place, bronze medalist(s)	Osmany Calzado	Cuba	8:54.15	
4	Ricardo Estremera	Puerto Rico	9:13.98	
5	Erick Rodríguez	Nicaragua	9:28.33	
	José Enier González*	Cuba	DNF	
	Norbis Cobas*	Cuba	DNF	

=== 4 × 100 meters relay ===
Heats – July 4

Rank	Heat	Nation	Competitors	Time	Notes
1	2	Trinidad and Tobago	Rondel Sorrillo, Emmanuel Callender, Jovon Toppin, Keston Bledman	39.25	Q
2	2	Dominican Republic	Carlos Jorge, Joel Báez, Wilfredo Juan, Gustavo Cuesta	39.60	Q
3	2	Cayman Islands	Kemar Hyman, Tyrell Cuffy, David Hamil, Carlos Morgan	39.69	Q
4	1	Jamaica	Kwayne Fisher, Rasheed Dwyer, Lerone Clarke, Kimor Bruce	39.70	Q
5	1	Bahamas	Rodney Greene, Adrian Griffith, Karlton Rolle, Dereck Atkins	39.88	Q
6	2	Venezuela	Arturo Ramírez, Ronald Amaya, Alvaro Cassiani, Lannyn Cubillán	40.23	q
7	2	Netherlands Antilles	Obed Martis, Nygell Domfries, Terrence Agard, Rachmill van Lamoen	40.23	q
8	1	United States Virgin Islands	Adrian Durant, Tabarie Henry, David Walters, Leon Hunt	40.89	Q
9	2	Haiti	Dominique Degrammont, Marvin Bien-Aime, Roudy Monrose, Alie Beauvais	40.98	
	1	Cuba	David Lescay, Roberto Skyers, Yunier Pérez, Michael Herrera	DNF	
	1	Barbados		DNS	

Final – July 4

Rank	Nation	Competitors	Time	Notes
1st place, gold medalist(s)	Trinidad and Tobago	Rondel Sorrillo, Emmanuel Callender, Jovon Toppin, Keston Bledman	38.73	
2nd place, silver medalist(s)	Jamaica	Kwayne Fisher, Lerone Clarke, Rasheed Dwyer, Rayon Lawrence	39.31	
3rd place, bronze medalist(s)	Bahamas	Rodney Greene, Adrian Griffith, Karlton Rolle, Dereck Atkins	39.45	
4	Dominican Republic	Carlos Jorge, Joel Báez, Wilfredo Juan, Gustavo Cuesta	39.52	
5	Cayman Islands	Kemar Hyman, Tyrell Cuffy, David Hamil, Carlos Morgan	39.54	
6	United States Virgin Islands	Adrian Durant, Tabarie Henry, David Walters, Calvin Dascent	39.89	
7	Venezuela	Arturo Ramírez, Ronald Amaya, Alvaro Cassiani, Lannyn Cubillán	40.18	
8	Netherlands Antilles	Obed Martis, Nygell Domfries, Terrence Agard, Rachmill van Lamoen	40.44	

=== 4 × 400 meters relay ===
July 5

Rank	Heat	Nation	Competitors	Time	Notes
1st place, gold medalist(s)	2	Cuba	William Collazo, Omar Cisneros, Noel Ruíz, Yeimer López	3:03.26	
2nd place, silver medalist(s)	2	Dominican Republic	Ramón Frías, Arismendy Peguero, Yoel Tapia, Félix Sánchez	3:03.30	
3rd place, bronze medalist(s)	2	Jamaica	Oral Thompson, Dane Hyatt, Marvin Essor, Leford Green	3:04.09	
4	2	Bahamas	Andretti Bain, Avard Moncour, La'Sean Pickstock, Ramon Miller	3:05.00	
5	2	Puerto Rico	Víctor Benítez, Javier Culson, Fabián Martínez, Héctor Carrasquillo	3:05.13	
6	2	Trinidad and Tobago	Jarrin Solomon, Jovon Toppin, Emmanuel Mayers, Jehue Gordon	3:05.17	
7	1	United States Virgin Islands	Calvin Dascent, Tabarie Henry, Leslie Murray, Terry Charles	3:07.05	
8	1	Venezuela	Freddy Mezones, Albert Bravo, Said Bono, Omar Longart	3:09.61	
9	2	Colombia	Javier Mosquera, John Valoyes, Yeison Rivas, Geiner Mosquera	3:10.65	
10	1	Costa Rica	Víctor Cantillano, Arnoldo Monge, Marco Vinicio Pérez, Nery Brenes	3:12.20	
11	1	Guatemala	Stiven Navarrete, José Amado García, Allan Ayala, Camilo Quevedo	3:21.33	
	1	Netherlands Antilles		DNS	

=== 20 kilometers walk ===
July 4

Rank	Name	Nationality	Time	Notes
1st place, gold medalist(s)	Walter Sandoval	El Salvador	1:33:10	
2nd place, silver medalist(s)	Allan Segura	Costa Rica	1:34:58	
3rd place, bronze medalist(s)	Noel Santini	Puerto Rico	1:39:44	
4	Aníbal Paau	Guatemala	1:40:39	
	Yosley Soto*	Cuba	1:36:19	
	Yurbraile Hernández	Cuba	DNF	
	Juan Carlos Soto	Cuba	DQ	
	Ricardo Reyes	El Salvador	DQ	
	Bernardo Oliva*	Cuba	DQ	
	Adrián Herrera	Mexico	DNS	
	David Mejia	Mexico	DNS	

=== High jump ===
July 5

Rank	Athlete	Nationality	1.90	1.95	2.00	2.05	2.10	2.13	2.16	2.19	2.22	Result	Notes
1st place, gold medalist(s)	James Grayman	Antigua and Barbuda	–	–	–	o	o	–	o	o	xxx	2.19	
2nd place, silver medalist(s)	Wanner Miller	Colombia	–	–	–	–	o	o	o	xo	xxx	2.19	
3rd place, bronze medalist(s)	Yordano Glemaud	Cuba	–	–	o	o	xxo	o	o	xxx		2.16	
4	Trevor Barry	Bahamas	–	–	–	o	–	xo	–	xxx		2.13	
5	Henderson Dottin	Barbados	–	–	xo	o	xo	xo	xxx			2.13	
6	Osvaldo Hernández	Cuba	–	–	–	xo	o	xxx				2.10	
7	Thorrold Murray	Barbados	–	–	o	o	xxx					2.05	
8	Albert Bravo	Venezuela	–	–	–	xxo	xxx					2.05	
9	Henry Linton	Costa Rica	o	–	xo	xxo	xxx					2.05	
10	Raymond Higgs	Bahamas	o	–	–	–	xxx					1.90	
	Dailen Ortega*	Cuba	–	–	–	o	o	–	xo	xxx		2.16	

=== Pole vault ===
July 4

Rank	Athlete	Nationality	4.60	4.70	4.80	4.90	5.00	5.10	5.20	Result	Notes
1st place, gold medalist(s)	David Díaz	Puerto Rico	–	o	xxo	xo	xxo	xxx		5.00	
2nd place, silver medalist(s)	Natanael Semeis	Dominican Republic	xo	–	o	–	–	xxx		4.80	
3rd place, bronze medalist(s)	César González	Venezuela	xo	–	xo	xxx				4.80	
4	Gilberto Cabrera	Cuba	–	xxo	xxx					4.70	
	Yasel Ciscal*	Cuba	–	xxo	xo	o	xxo	xxx		5.00	
	Lázaro Borges	Cuba	–	–	–	–	–	–	xxx	NM	
	Cristian Sánchez	Mexico	–	–	–	–	–	xxx		NM	
	Jeisel Cintrón	Puerto Rico	–	xxx						NM	
	Jorge Montes	Dominican Republic	xxx							NM	

=== Long jump ===
July 4

Rank	Athlete	Nationality	#1	#2	#3	#4	#5	#6	Result	Notes
1st place, gold medalist(s)	Osbourne Moxey	Bahamas	7.95	7.76	X	7.96	7.85	7.82w	7.96	
2nd place, silver medalist(s)	Carlos Morgan	Cayman Islands	X	X	7.87	X	X	X	7.87	
3rd place, bronze medalist(s)	Rudon Bastian	Bahamas	7.49	X	7.57	7.46	X	7.56	7.57	
4	Eddy Florian	Dominican Republic	6.87	6.93	7.17	7.49	7.40	X	7.49	
5	Carl Morgan	Cayman Islands	7.48	6.93	7.17	7.49	7.40	X	7.48	
6	Ibrain Camejo	Cuba	7.24	7.43	–	–	–	–	7.43	
7	Lovintz Tota	Bermuda	7.01	X	6.96	6.74	7.08	5.87	7.08	
8	Cleavon Dillon	Trinidad and Tobago	7.07	6.82	6.86	–	6.93	6.87	7.07	
9	Fabián Padrón	Venezuela	6.93	6.65	6.90	6.92	X	–	6.93	
10	Leon Hunt	United States Virgin Islands	6.92	6.45	6.82				6.92	
11	Kessel Campbell	Honduras	6.65	6.63	–				6.65	
12	Jasson Castro	Honduras	6.55	X	6.46				6.55	
	Oslay Vilches*	Cuba	X	7.71	7.74				7.74	
	Wilfredo Martínez	Cuba	X	X	–				NM	

=== Triple jump ===
July 5

Rank	Athlete	Nationality	#1	#2	#3	#4	#5	#6	Result	Notes
1st place, gold medalist(s)	Alexis Copello	Cuba	16.93	X	17.33	–	–	–	17.33	CR
2nd place, silver medalist(s)	Yoandri Betanzos	Cuba	17.15	17.18	X	17.22	17.24	17.16	17.24	
3rd place, bronze medalist(s)	Chris Hercules	Trinidad and Tobago	15.91	X	15.76	X	X	X	15.91	
4	Ayata Joseph	Antigua and Barbuda	15.68	15.60	X	X	15.60	15.42	15.68	
5	Gregory Hughes	Barbados	15.59	X	15.20	15.38	X	14.99	15.59	
6	Carl Morgan	Cayman Islands	X	15.02	15.32	15.20	X	15.12	15.32	
7	Jasson Castro	Honduras	15.03	15.08	14.26	X	–	–	15.08	
	Arnie David Giralt*	Cuba	17.19	17.46	–				17.46	
	Yordanys Durañona*	Cuba	16.32	16.76	X				16.76	
	Fabián Padrón	Venezuela	X	–	–				DNF	
	Osniel Tosca*	Cuba							DNS	

=== Shot put ===
July 3

Rank	Athlete	Nationality	#1	#2	#3	#4	#5	#6	Result	Notes
1st place, gold medalist(s)	Carlos Véliz	Cuba	19.43	20.10	X	X	19.53	20.10	20.10	
2nd place, silver medalist(s)	Reynaldo Proenza	Cuba	18.79	18.75	X	18.81	X	18.75	18.81	
3rd place, bronze medalist(s)	Yojer Medina	Venezuela	16.31	16.46	15.82	17.05	16.49	16.85	17.05	
4	Raymond Brown	Jamaica	16.55	15.83	16.38	16.14	15.89	15.77	16.55	
5	Carlos Martínez	Puerto Rico	15.63	16.04	16.17	15.39	X	X	16.17	
	Jesús Parejo	Venezuela							DNS	

=== Discus throw ===
July 3

Rank	Athlete	Nationality	#1	#2	#3	#4	#5	#6	Result	Notes
1st place, gold medalist(s)	Jorge Fernández	Cuba	58.46	60.89	61.79	61.78	X	X	61.79	
2nd place, silver medalist(s)	Yunio Lastre	Cuba	X	59.80	X	X	X	X	59.80	
3rd place, bronze medalist(s)	Jason Morgan	Jamaica	55.09	X	X	52.10	56.06	57.47	57.47	
4	Jesús Parejo	Venezuela	55.21	53.32	54.81	55.50	54.79	55.92	55.92	
5	Quincy Wilson	Trinidad and Tobago	50.16	54.73	X	54.81	51.57	53.13	54.81	
6	Eric Mathias	British Virgin Islands	51.21	50.24	X	X	52.47	52.97	52.97	
	Randy Noa*	Cuba	57.73	55.57	56.82	56.15	X	X	57.73	
	Hermes Cuesta*	Cuba	54.44	X	56.12	X	56.94	56.43	56.94	

=== Hammer throw ===
July 4

Rank	Athlete	Nationality	#1	#2	#3	#4	#5	#6	Result	Notes
1st place, gold medalist(s)	Roberto Janet	Cuba	72.25	71.73	X	72.52	72.22	73.80	73.80	
2nd place, silver medalist(s)	Noleisis Bicet	Cuba	70.83	71.80	72.46	71.40	X	69.97	72.46	
3rd place, bronze medalist(s)	Raúl Rivera	Guatemala	65.48	X	65.77	X	65.27	66.02	66.02	
4	Aldo Bello	Venezuela	X	63.83	63.87	65.24	63.97	64.95	65.24	
5	Roberto Sawyer	Costa Rica	X	63.88	63.78	X	62.55	–	63.88	
6	Wilfredo de Jesús	Puerto Rico	58.60	59.65	X	58.38	X	58.49	59.65	
7	Michael Letterlough	Cayman Islands	58.26	X	58.28	58.16	59.50	X	59.50	
8	Jan Rosario	Puerto Rico	57.57	57.34	X	58.78	57.37	X	58.78	
	Reinier Mejías*	Cuba	69.49	X	X				69.49	
	Joelvis Hernández*	Cuba	X	61.14	59.68				61.14	

=== Javelin throw ===
July 4

Rank	Athlete	Nationality	#1	#2	#3	#4	#5	#6	Result	Notes
1st place, gold medalist(s)	Guillermo Martínez	Cuba	74.28	82.16	79.41	–	–	75.95	82.16	
2nd place, silver medalist(s)	Dayron Márquez	Colombia	76.09	78.91	78.83	70.83	72.36	72.84	78.91	
3rd place, bronze medalist(s)	Arley Ibargüen	Colombia	X	69.14	72.20	X	73.95	75.16	75.16	
4	Yudel Moreno	Cuba	66.29	66.93	69.20	67.09	70.16	X	70.16	
5	Juan Méndez	Mexico	67.51	63.09	68.77	X	65.62	65.31	68.77	
6	Felipe Ortíz	Puerto Rico	65.19	X	68.40	63.08	67.56	67.85	68.40	
7	Justin Cummins	Barbados	X	65.81	62.13	64.17	60.74	X	65.81	
8	Rigoberto Calderón	Nicaragua	X	63.72	63.47	63.50	62.74	64.76	64.76	
9	Albert Reynolds	Saint Lucia	58.75	63.52	X				63.52	
10	Omar Jones	British Virgin Islands	62.61	X	X				62.61	
11	Jorge Martínez	Puerto Rico	54.52	58.37	60.92				60.92	
12	Kerron Browne	Trinidad and Tobago	57.49	52.59	X				57.49	
	Samek Connor	Anguilla	X	X	X				NM	

=== Decathlon ===
July 3–4

The highest mark recorded in each event is highlighted in yellow

Rank	Athlete	Nationality	100m	LJ	SP	HJ	400m	110m H	DT	PV	JT	1500m	Points	Notes
1st place, gold medalist(s)	Leonel Suárez	Cuba	11.07	7.42	14.39	2.09	47.65	14.15	46.07	4.70	77.47	4:27.29	8654	
2nd place, silver medalist(s)	Yunior Díaz	Cuba	10.71	7.58	14.31	1.97	47.16	14.49	43.81	4.10	56.41	4:40.70	8013	
3rd place, bronze medalist(s)	Claston Bernard	Jamaica	11.05	6.62	14.56	2.09	51.04	14.33	45.00	4.30	54.98	4:46.14	7698	
4	Willian Valor	Jamaica	11.22	6.75	12.38	1.85	50.62	15.47	36.72	3.90	59.09	4:55.39	6945	
5	Adolphus Jones	Saint Kitts and Nevis	11.56	6.47	13.09	1.94	52.48	15.35	33.67	4.00	46.25	4:33.47	6774	
6	Leandro López	Dominican Republic	11.45	6.46	11.46	NM	50.11	16.26	37.92	4.10	56.72	4:49.63	6116	
	Juan Gilberto Alcázar*	Cuba	11.79	6.82	11.42	2.00	50.53	15.43	37.19	4.10	50.78	4:27.28	7042	
	Alexey Chibás*	Cuba	11.00	NM	15.28	1.97	51.07	14.34	49.67	4.20	54.86	4:46.41	6979	
	Marcos Sánchez	Puerto Rico	11.23	6.12	13.49	1.85	49.88	16.37	38.00	NM	52.90	DNS	DNF	
	Yosley Azcuy*	Cuba	11.31	6.64	14.13	1.91	54.98	DNS	44.62	DNS	–	–	DNF	
	Darwin Colón	Honduras	11.27	6.37	12.53	1.82	54.51	DNS	–	–	–	–	DNF	

== Women's results ==
=== 100 meters ===
Heats – July 3
Wind:
Heat 1: +1.1 m/s, Heat 2: -0.5 m/s, Heat 3: +1.0 m/s

Rank	Heat	Name	Nationality	Time	Notes
1	3	Carol Rodríguez	Puerto Rico	11.42	Q
2	2	Tahesia Harrigan	British Virgin Islands	11.43	Q
3	1	Semoy Hackett	Trinidad and Tobago	11.47	Q
4	3	Schillonie Calvert	Jamaica	11.50	Q
5	3	Shakera Reece	Barbados	11.56	q
6	2	Ayanna Hutchinson	Trinidad and Tobago	11.57	Q
7	1	Courtney Patterson	United States Virgin Islands	11.59	Q
8	1	Virgen Benavides	Cuba	11.65	
8	1	Sheniqua Ferguson	Bahamas	11.65	
8	2	Janika Martell	Jamaica	11.65	q
11	3	Yomara Hinestroza	Colombia	11.68	
12	1	Felipa Palacios	Colombia	11.76	
13	1	Meritzer Williams	Saint Kitts and Nevis	11.77	
14	2	Tameka Williams	Saint Kitts and Nevis	11.78	
15	3	Jernise Saunders	Bahamas	11.82	
16	2	Ruth Bustamante	Dominican Republic	12.08	
17	2	Kaina Martínez	Belize	12.16	
17	3	Dayneris Bience	Cuba	12.16	
19	2	Sharolyn Scott	Costa Rica	12.20	
20	1	Karene King	British Virgin Islands	12.33	
21	3	Wendy Reynoso	Dominican Republic	12.41	
22	3	Mariela Leal	Costa Rica	12.47	

Final – July 3
Wind:
+0.8 m/s

Rank	Lane	Name	Nationality	Time	Notes
1st place, gold medalist(s)	5	Tahesia Harrigan	British Virgin Islands	11.21	
2nd place, silver medalist(s)	3	Semoy Hackett	Trinidad and Tobago	11.35	
3rd place, bronze medalist(s)	4	Carol Rodríguez	Puerto Rico	11.38	
4	2	Ayanna Hutchinson	Trinidad and Tobago	11.45	
5	6	Schillonie Calvert	Jamaica	11.53	
6	8	Janika Martell	Jamaica	11.56	
7	1	Shakera Reece	Barbados	11.63	
	7	Courtney Patterson	United States Virgin Islands	DNS	

=== 200 meters ===
Heats – July 5
Wind:
Heat 1: -1.8 m/s, Heat 2: +0.2 m/s, Heat 3: +0.5 m/s

Rank	Heat	Name	Nationality	Time	Notes
1	3	Virgil Hodge	Saint Kitts and Nevis	23.31	Q
2	3	Carol Rodríguez	Puerto Rico	23.32	Q
3	3	Schillonie Calvert	Jamaica	23.66	q
4	3	Semoy Hackett	Trinidad and Tobago	23.75	q
5	1	Meritzer Williams	Saint Kitts and Nevis	23.78	Q
5	2	Roxana Díaz	Cuba	23.78	Q
7	1	Erika Rivera	Puerto Rico	23.87	Q
8	1	Ruth Grajeda	Mexico	24.01	
9	2	Reyare Thomas	Trinidad and Tobago	24.12	Q
10	1	Nelkis Casabona	Cuba	24.25	
11	2	Jernise Saunders	Bahamas	24.59	
12	3	Margarita de la Cruz	Dominican Republic	24.74	
13	1	Wanetta Kirby	United States Virgin Islands	24.98	
14	1	Sharolyn Scott	Costa Rica	25.02	
15	2	Mariela Leal	Costa Rica	25.45	
16	2	Ivette Gracía de Hoyos	Mexico	25.67	
	2	Anastasia Le-Roy	Jamaica	DNS	
	3	Sheniqua Ferguson	Bahamas	DNS	
	3	Courtney Patterson	United States Virgin Islands	DNS	

Final – July 5
Wind:
-1.2 m/s

Rank	Lane	Name	Nationality	Time	Notes
1st place, gold medalist(s)	4	Virgil Hodge	Saint Kitts and Nevis	23.41	
2nd place, silver medalist(s)	5	Roxana Díaz	Cuba	23.56	
3rd place, bronze medalist(s)	7	Reyare Thomas	Trinidad and Tobago	23.61	
4	6	Carol Rodríguez	Puerto Rico	23.61	
5	2	Erika Rivera	Puerto Rico	23.98	
6	3	Meritzer Williams	Saint Kitts and Nevis	24.04	
7	1	Schillonie Calvert	Jamaica	24.11	
	8	Semoy Hackett	Trinidad and Tobago	DNS	

=== 400 meters ===
Heats – July 3

Rank	Heat	Name	Nationality	Time	Notes
1	2	Indira Terrero	Cuba	52.63	Q
2	1	Daisurami Bonne	Cuba	52.94	Q
3	2	Norma González	Colombia	52.96	Q
4	1	Alejandra Idrobo	Colombia	53.64	Q
5	1	Shakeitha Henfield	Bahamas	53.91	q
6	3	Tiandra Ponteen	Saint Kitts and Nevis	53.99	Q
7	2	Sasha Rolle	Bahamas	54.00	q
8	2	Alejandra Cherizola	Mexico	54.14	
9	3	Raysa Sánchez	Dominican Republic	54.61	Q
10	3	Hazel-Ann Regis	Grenada	54.66	
11	3	Karla Hope	Trinidad and Tobago	54.74	
12	3	Nayeli Vela	Mexico	54.78	
13	2	Natalie Dixon	Trinidad and Tobago	54.79	
14	1	Ashley Kelly	British Virgin Islands	54.82	
15	1	Anastasia Le-Roy	Jamaica	55.85	
16	2	Diana Taylor	Dominican Republic	56.68	
17	3	Dominique Maloney	British Virgin Islands	56.90	
18	1	Tamara Quintanilla	El Salvador	59.01	
19	2	Stephanie Zamora	Costa Rica	59.44	
20	3	Fátima Castro	El Salvador	1:00.93	
21	1	Yolide Solís	Costa Rica	1:01.47	
	3	Rosemarie Whyte	Jamaica	DQ	

Final – July 3

Rank	Lane	Name	Nationality	Time	Notes
1st place, gold medalist(s)	4	Indira Terrero	Cuba	51.64	
2nd place, silver medalist(s)	6	Norma González	Colombia	51.90	
3rd place, bronze medalist(s)	5	Daisurami Bonne	Cuba	52.31	
4	3	Tiandra Ponteen	Saint Kitts and Nevis	53.34	
5	2	Alejandra Idrobo	Colombia	53.95	
6	7	Raysa Sánchez	Dominican Republic	54.22	
7	8	Sasha Rolle	Bahamas	54.37	
8	1	Shakeitha Henfield	Bahamas	54.55	

=== 800 meters ===
July 5

Rank	Name	Nationality	Time	Notes
1st place, gold medalist(s)	Zulia Calatayud	Cuba	2:01.63	
2nd place, silver medalist(s)	Pilar McShine	Trinidad and Tobago	2:02.79	
3rd place, bronze medalist(s)	Diosmely Peña	Cuba	2:03.87	
4	Melissa DeLeon	Trinidad and Tobago	2:04.45	
5	Cristina Guevara	Mexico	2:06.24	
6	Samantha John	British Virgin Islands	2:07.59	
7	Alicia Zapata	Dominican Republic	2:13.58	
8	María Osorio	Venezuela	2:14.69	
9	Wendy Zuñiga	Costa Rica	2:19.41	

=== 1500 meters ===
July 4

Rank	Name	Nationality	Time	Notes
1st place, gold medalist(s)	Yadira Bataille	Cuba	4:23.82	
2nd place, silver medalist(s)	Anayeli Navarro	Mexico	4:25.82	
3rd place, bronze medalist(s)	María Osorio	Venezuela	4:29.83	
4	Yirlan Kindelán	Cuba	4:34.16	
5	Sonny Garcia	Dominican Republic	4:37.99	
6	Iracema Parra	Mexico	4:40.12	
7	Wendy Zuñiga	Costa Rica	4:56.05	
8	Jennelaine Vrolyk	Aruba	5:18.38	

=== 5000 meters ===
July 5

Rank	Name	Nationality	Time	Notes
1st place, gold medalist(s)	Yudileyvis Castillo	Cuba	16:03.68	CR
2nd place, silver medalist(s)	Yudisleidis Fuente	Cuba	16:08.63	
3rd place, bronze medalist(s)	Anayeli Navarro	Mexico	16:24.15	
4	Beverly Ramos	Puerto Rico	16:28.29	
	Iracema Parra	Mexico	DNF	

=== 10,000 meters ===
July 3

Rank	Name	Nationality	Time	Notes
1st place, gold medalist(s)	Yudileyvis Castillo	Cuba	33:50.68	
2nd place, silver medalist(s)	Dailín Belmonte	Cuba	36:40.32	
	Shariska Dirksz	Aruba	DNF	

=== Half marathon ===
July 5

Rank	Name	Nationality	Time	Notes
1st place, gold medalist(s)	Dailín Belmonte	Cuba	1:20:21	
2nd place, silver medalist(s)	Yailén García	Cuba	1:21:50	

=== 100 meters hurdles ===
Heats – July 3
Wind:
Heat 1: -0.3 m/s, Heat 2: -0.4 m/s

Rank	Heat	Name	Nationality	Time	Notes
1	2	Toni Ann Doyley	Jamaica	13.15	Q
2	1	Anay Tejeda	Cuba	13.16	Q
3	1	Brigitte Merlano	Colombia	13.27	Q
4	2	Yenima Arencibia	Cuba	13.35	Q
5	1	Aleesha Barber	Trinidad and Tobago	13.38	Q
6	2	LaVonne Idlette	Dominican Republic	13.57	Q
7	2	Tiavannia Thompson	Bahamas	13.63	q
8	2	Kierre Beckles	Barbados	13.97	q
9	1	Krystal Bodie	Bahamas	14.26	
	1	Belkis Milanés*	Cuba	DNS	
	2	Nickiesha Wilson	Jamaica	DNS	

Final – July 3
Wind:
+1.0 m/s

Rank	Lane	Name	Nationality	Time	Notes
1st place, gold medalist(s)	3	Anay Tejeda	Cuba	12.95	
2nd place, silver medalist(s)	2	Aleesha Barber	Trinidad and Tobago	13.12	
3rd place, bronze medalist(s)	4	Toni Ann Doyley	Jamaica	13.13	
4	5	Brigitte Merlano	Colombia	13.21	
5	6	Yenima Arencibia	Cuba	13.23	
6	7	LaVonne Idlette	Dominican Republic	13.50	
7	1	Tiavannia Thompson	Bahamas	13.77	
8	8	Kierre Beckles	Barbados	13.85	

=== 400 meters hurdles ===
July 5

Rank	Lane	Name	Nationality	Time	Notes
1st place, gold medalist(s)	1	Nickiesha Wilson	Jamaica	56.95	
2nd place, silver medalist(s)	4	Yadisleidy Pedroso	Cuba	57.73	
3rd place, bronze medalist(s)	3	Nikita Tracey	Jamaica	58.14	
4	5	Yolanda Osana	Dominican Republic	58.35	
5	6	Madelene Rondón	Venezuela	58.53	
6	7	Karla Dueñas	Mexico	59.74	
7	2	Dayani Lara	Cuba	1:00.28	

=== 3000 meters steeplechase ===
July 5

Rank	Name	Nationality	Time	Notes
1st place, gold medalist(s)	Ángela Figueroa	Colombia	10:03.44	
2nd place, silver medalist(s)	Milena Pérez	Cuba	10:12.96	
3rd place, bronze medalist(s)	Yoslín Ocampo	Cuba	10:22.35	
4	Evonne Marroquín	Guatemala	11:10.38	
5	Sonny García	Dominican Republic	11:36.27	

=== 4 × 100 meters relay ===
July 4

Rank	Nation	Competitors	Time	Notes
1st place, gold medalist(s)	Saint Kitts and Nevis	Tanika Liburd, Meritzer Williams, Tameka Williams, Virgil Hodge	43.53	NR
2nd place, silver medalist(s)	Colombia	Yomara Hinestroza, Felipa Palacios, Darlenis Obregón, Norma González	43.67	
3rd place, bronze medalist(s)	Trinidad and Tobago	Sasha Springer, Semoy Hackett, Reyare Thomas, Ayanna Hutchinson	43.75	
4	Jamaica	Schillonie Calvert, Anastasia Le-Roy, Janika Martell, Toni Ann Doyley	43.98	
5	Puerto Rico	Irelis Burgos, Celiangeli Morales, Erika Rivera, Carol Rodríguez	44.08	
6	Bahamas	Tamica Clarke, Sheniqua Ferguson, Tia Rolle, Jernise Saunders	44.13	
7	Costa Rica	Tatiana Zamora, Shantely Scott, Mariela Leal, Sharolyn Scott	47.46	
	Dominican Republic	LaVonne Idlette, Ruth Bustamante, Johanny Evangelista, Wendy Reynoso	DNF	

=== 4 × 400 meters relay ===
July 5

Rank	Nation	Competitors	Time	Notes
1st place, gold medalist(s)	Cuba	Roxana Díaz, Daisurami Bonne, Susana Clement, Indira Terrero	3:29.94	
2nd place, silver medalist(s)	Jamaica	Sonita Sutherland, Anastasia Le-Roy, Nickiesha Wilson, Nikita Tracey	3:34.02	
3rd place, bronze medalist(s)	Trinidad and Tobago	Karla Hope, Aleesha Barber, Melissa DeLeon, Natalie Dixon	3:35.18	
4	Mexico	Alejandra Cherizola, Nayeli Vela, Ruth Grajeda, Ivette García de Hoyos	3:37.55	
5	British Virgin Islands	Samantha John, Chantel Malone, Ashley Kelly, Dominique Maloney	3:37.62	
6	Dominican Republic	Diana Taylor, Raysa Sánchez, Margarita de la Cruz, Yolanda Osana	3:40.40	
7	Costa Rica	Yolide Solís, Wendy Zuñiga, Stephanie Zamora, Sharolyn Scott	3:54.81	

=== 10 kilometers walk ===
July 4

Rank	Name	Nationality	Time	Notes
1st place, gold medalist(s)	Yanelis Conte	Cuba	46:46	
2nd place, silver medalist(s)	Leisis Rodríguez	Cuba	47:42	
3rd place, bronze medalist(s)	Cristina López	El Salvador	49:30	
4	Milángela Rosales	Venezuela	50:11	
5	Jamy Franco	Guatemala	51:19	
6	Verónica Colindres	El Salvador	52:08	
7	Adriana Ochoa	Mexico	57:38	
	Aliuska Machado*	Cuba	50:22	
	Susel Rodríguez*	Cuba	54:05	
	María Esther Sánchez*	Mexico	DNS	

=== High jump ===
July 4

Rank	Athlete	Nationality	1.60	1.65	1.70	1.73	1.76	1.79	1.82	1.85	1.88	1.91	1.96	Result	Notes
1st place, gold medalist(s)	Levern Spencer	Saint Lucia	–	–	–	–	–	–	–	o	o	o	xxx	1.91	
2nd place, silver medalist(s)	Sheree Francis	Jamaica	–	–	–	xo	o	o	o	xo	o	xxx		1.88	
3rd place, bronze medalist(s)	Lesyaní Mayor	Cuba	o	o	xo	–	xo	xxx						1.76	
4	Massiel Jiménez	Dominican Republic	o	o	o	o	xxx							1.73	
5	Marisleydis Lesli	Cuba	xo	o	xxx									1.65	

=== Pole vault ===
July 3

Rank	Athlete	Nationality	3.90	4.00	4.10	4.20	4.40	4.51	Result	Notes
1st place, gold medalist(s)	Yarisley Silva	Cuba	–	–	–	xo	o	xxx	4.40	
2nd place, silver medalist(s)	Dailis Caballero	Cuba	xo	o	o	xxx			4.10	
	Maryoris Sánchez*	Cuba	o	o	xxx				4.00	

=== Long jump ===
July 4

Rank	Athlete	Nationality	#1	#2	#3	#4	#5	#6	Result	Notes
1st place, gold medalist(s)	Shara Proctor	Anguilla	X	6.29	6.34	6.24	6.48	6.61	6.61	
2nd place, silver medalist(s)	Rhonda Watkins	Trinidad and Tobago	6.30	X	X	5.88	5.87	6.47	6.47	
3rd place, bronze medalist(s)	Tanika Liburd	Saint Kitts and Nevis	6.42	6.25	6.05	X	6.12	6.36	6.42	
4	Bianca Stuart	Bahamas	X	5.86	6.05	5.58	6.18	6.31	6.31	
5	Charisse Bacchius	Trinidad and Tobago	X	X	6.10	5.97	6.16	X	6.16	
6	Dailenis Alcántara	Cuba	6.02	5.97	5.90	4.54	6.07	5.93	6.07	
7	Sheriffa Whyte	Saint Kitts and Nevis	6.01	5.65	5.89	5.81	5.97	5.88	6.01	
8	Ayde Villareal	Mexico	5.77	5.83	5.98	5.87	X	5.73	5.98	
9	Patricia Sylvester	Grenada	5.93	5.75	5.88				5.93	
10	Chantel Malone	British Virgin Islands	5.75	5.82	5.85				5.85	
11	Verónica Davis	Venezuela	5.70	5.59	X				5.70	
12	Neslie Bernardi	Puerto Rico	5.63	5.46	5.66				5.66	
13	Fabiola Taylor	Dominican Republic	5.49	5.63	5.43				5.63	
14	Wanetta Kirby	United States Virgin Islands	5.55	X	X				5.55	

=== Triple jump ===
July 3

Rank	Athlete	Nationality	#1	#2	#3	#4	#5	#6	Result	Notes
1st place, gold medalist(s)	Yargelis Savigne	Cuba	14.31	14.97	X	14.66	–	–	14.97	CR
2nd place, silver medalist(s)	Mabel Gay	Cuba	14.34	X	13.88	X	14.48	X	14.48	
3rd place, bronze medalist(s)	Kimberly Williams	Jamaica	X	13.22	13.33	X	13.23	13.78	13.78	
4	Patricia Sylvester	Grenada	13.14	11.25	13.76	13.56w	13.19	13.38	13.76	
5	Ayanna Alexander	Trinidad and Tobago	13.44	13.66	13.71	X	13.52w	13.70	13.71	
6	Verónica Davis	Venezuela	X	13.55	13.34	13.64	X	13.68	13.68	
7	Ayde Villareal	Mexico	13.20	13.19	13.18	13.23	X	13.23	13.23	
8	Seidre Forde	Barbados	X	X	12.55	X	X	12.62	12.62	
	Dailenis Alcántara*	Cuba							DNS	
	Josleidy Ribalta*	Cuba							DNS	

=== Shot put ===
July 5

Rank	Athlete	Nationality	#1	#2	#3	#4	#5	#6	Result	Notes
1st place, gold medalist(s)	Misleydis González	Cuba	18.58	18.29	19.13	X	18.61	18.36	19.13	CR
2nd place, silver medalist(s)	Yaniuvis López	Cuba	18.25	18.63	18.81	18.14	X	18.55	18.81	
3rd place, bronze medalist(s)	Cleopatra Borel-Brown	Trinidad and Tobago	17.39	X	17.90	17.98	17.52	17.76	17.98	
4	Annie Alexander	Trinidad and Tobago	X	X	14.61	15.56	15.44	17.36	17.36	
5	Keisha Walkes	Barbados	15.07	15.77	15.61	16.31	15.29	16.49	16.49	
6	Zara Northover	Jamaica	15.72	15.27	16.40	15.96	16.30	14.83	16.40	
7	Nadia Alexander	Jamaica	15.73	X	15.94	15.82	16.11	X	16.11	
8	Tamara Lechuga	Mexico	14.85	X	15.41	14.96	15.07	14.96	15.41	

=== Discus throw ===
July 3

Rank	Athlete	Nationality	#1	#2	#3	#4	#5	#6	Result	Notes
1st place, gold medalist(s)	Yarelis Barrios	Cuba	62.07	X	59.26	61.58	61.35	62.10	62.10	
2nd place, silver medalist(s)	Yarisley Collado	Cuba	X	61.33	X	X	X	60.11	61.33	
3rd place, bronze medalist(s)	María Cubillán	Venezuela	X	50.88	55.32	54.96	55.57	52.41	55.57	
4	Annie Alexander	Trinidad and Tobago	X	46.60	52.68	X	X	49.18	52.68	
5	Rosario Ramos	Venezuela	X	50.18	49.80				50.18	
6	Joeane Jadotte	Haiti	49.94	X	X				49.94	
7	Ashlee Smith	Trinidad and Tobago	46.35	46.50	X				46.50	
8	Irais Estrada	Mexico	X	40.78	41.81				41.81	
	Yania Ferrales*	Cuba	63.12	62.39	X	61.83	62.69	–	63.12	
	Yaima Vives*	Cuba	53.48	53.98	X	X	53.50	52.82	53.98	
	Lisandra Rodríguez*	Cuba	X	53.85	X	X	X	X	53.85	
	Yuneimis Soria*	Cuba	X	50.68	52.80	52.01	X	X	52.80	
	Denia Caballero*	Cuba							DNS	
	Luz Montaño	Colombia							DNS	

=== Hammer throw ===
July 4

Rank	Athlete	Nationality	#1	#2	#3	#4	#5	#6	Result	Notes
1st place, gold medalist(s)	Arasay Thondike	Cuba	65.93	68.91	X	66.37	68.48	71.32	71.32	CR
2nd place, silver medalist(s)	Rosa Rodríguez	Venezuela	69.06	64.50	65.66	X	64.61	67.53	69.06	
3rd place, bronze medalist(s)	Johana Moreno	Colombia	67.66	X	66.98	X	X	64.22	67.66	
4	Yarisleydi Ford	Cuba	60.77	61.85	X	63.90	X	X	63.90	
5	Natalie Grant	Jamaica	X	58.79	55.74	X	57.47	X	58.79	
	Ariannis Vichy*	Cuba	X	63.72	61.65	X	62.59	X	63.72	
	Yulie Hernández*	Cuba	X	58.15	58.96	60.45	X	X	60.45	
	Claudia Goitizolo*	Cuba	X	55.46	X	X	X	X	55.46	
	Yunaika Crawford*	Cuba							DNS	

=== Javelin throw ===
July 5

Rank	Athlete	Nationality	#1	#2	#3	#4	#5	#6	Result	Notes
1st place, gold medalist(s)	Yainelis Ribeaux	Cuba	59.68	X	58.26	X	55.53	X	59.68	
2nd place, silver medalist(s)	Osleidys Menéndez	Cuba	57.32	58.62	58.69	X	X	X	58.69	
3rd place, bronze medalist(s)	Laverne Eve	Bahamas	55.54	55.16	X	X	X	52.58	55.54	
4	Ana Erika Gutiérrez	Mexico	47.08	49.73	48.93	46.22	48.69	46.53	49.73	
5	Katima Riettie	Jamaica	48.46	X	46.91	45.51	X	48.14	48.46	
6	María de los Angeles González	Venezuela	46.89	42.77	43.92	X	44.19	43.09	46.89	
7	Tanesha Blair	Jamaica	43.16	43.59	42.90	42.81	–	–	43.59	
	Yanet Cruz*	Cuba	61.28	X	58.31	X	59.90	58.12	61.28	
	Dayamit Delgado*	Cuba	X	54.69	X				54.69	

=== Heptathlon ===
July 4–5

The highest mark recorded in each event is highlighted in yellow

Rank	Athlete	Nationality	100m H	HJ	SP	200m	LJ	JT	800m	Points	Notes
1st place, gold medalist(s)	Gretchen Quintana	Cuba	14.24	1.64	13.58	24.42	5.93	37.21	2:19.27	5710	
2nd place, silver medalist(s)	Yarianny Argüelles	Cuba	13.92	1.73	11.54	24.17	6.30	32.48	2:27.40	5669	
3rd place, bronze medalist(s)	Shianne Smith	Bermuda	15.04	1.52	9.80	24.92	5.70	32.73	2:20.92	4988	
4	Natoya Baird	Trinidad and Tobago	14.68	1.70	10.04	26.43	5.17	31.23	2:45.21	4652	
	Yusleydis Limonta*	Cuba	14.34	1.79	12.00	25.68	5.90	32.28	2:33.55	5371	
	Lisandra Carrión*	Cuba	DQ	1.61	12.38	25.78	5.50	38.40	2:24.16	4355	
	Makeba Alcide	Saint Lucia	18.99	1.61	10.78	DNS	–	–	–	DNF	
