= 2008 Central American and Caribbean Championships in Athletics – Results =

Athletic competitions in Colombia

These are the official results of the 2008 Central American and Caribbean Championships in Athletics which took place on July 4–6, 2008 in Cali, Colombia.

Note: There were some guest athletes competing whose countries were not eligible to participate. Performances of such athletes were not eligible for medals and are given below all others.

== Men's results ==
=== 100 meters ===
Heats – July 3
Wind:
Heat 1: +0.2 m/s, Heat 2: +1.0 m/s, Heat 3: –0.5 m/s, Heat 4: +1.1 m/s

Rank	Heat	Name	Nationality	Time	Notes
1	1	Daniel Grueso	Colombia	10.33	Q
2	4	Adrian Griffith	Bahamas	10.36	Q
3	4	Lerone Clarke	Jamaica	10.38	Q
4	1	Daniel Bailey	Antigua and Barbuda	10.39	Q
4	2	Keston Bledman	Trinidad and Tobago	10.39	Q
6	4	Jean Carlos Peguero	Dominican Republic	10.40	Q
7	2	Lee Prowell	Guyana	10.43	Q
8	2	Joel Báez	Dominican Republic	10.44	Q
9	1	Rolando Palacios	Honduras	10.45	Q
10	1	Rodney Green	Bahamas	10.46	q
10	3	Tyrell Cuffy	Cayman Islands	10.46	Q
10	3	Henry Vizcaíno	Cuba	10.46	Q
13	4	Darrel Brown	Trinidad and Tobago	10.47	q
14	4	Jeremy Bascom	Guyana	10.50	q
15	3	Prince Kwidama	Netherlands Antilles	10.51	Q
15	3	Adrian Durant	United States Virgin Islands	10.51	Q
17	3	Delwayne Delaney	Saint Kitts and Nevis	10.59	
17	4	Richard Richardson	Antigua and Barbuda	10.59	
19	1	Davaon Spence	Jamaica	10.69	
20	1	Cristián Reyes	Chile	10.69	
21	2	Jared Lewis	Saint Vincent and the Grenadines	10.71	
22	3	Jorge Luis Solórzano	Guatemala	10.73	
23	4	Xavier James	Bermuda	10.74	
24	2	Jason Rogers	Saint Kitts and Nevis	10.81	
25	1	Pablo Jiménez	Mexico	10.89	
26	3	Juan Miguel Zeledón	Nicaragua	11.59	
	2	Álvaro Gómez	Colombia	DQ	

Semi-finals – July 4
Wind:
Heat 1: +0.7 m/s, Heat 2: +0.8 m/s

Rank	Heat	Name	Nationality	Time	Notes
1	1	Daniel Bailey	Antigua and Barbuda	10.25	Q
2	2	Daniel Grueso	Colombia	10.29	Q
3	1	Adrian Griffith	Bahamas	10.30	Q
4	1	Lerone Clarke	Jamaica	10.30	Q
5	2	Rodney Green	Bahamas	10.31	Q
6	2	Darrel Brown	Trinidad and Tobago	10.32	Q
7	2	Tyrell Cuffy	Cayman Islands	10.36	q
8	1	Rolando Palacios	Honduras	10.37	NR
8	2	Henry Vizcaíno	Cuba	10.37	q
10	1	Keston Bledman	Trinidad and Tobago	10.38	
11	2	Lee Prowell	Guyana	10.41	
12	2	Jean Carlos Peguero	Dominican Republic	10.45	
13	1	Jeremy Bascom	Guyana	10.47	
13	2	Adrian Durant	United States Virgin Islands	10.47	
15	1	Joel Báez	Dominican Republic	10.54	
16	1	Prince Kwidama	Netherlands Antilles	10.71	

Final – July 4
Wind: +0.6 m/s

Rank	Name	Nationality	Time	Notes
1st place, gold medalist(s)	Darrel Brown	Trinidad and Tobago	10.12	
2nd place, silver medalist(s)	Daniel Bailey	Antigua and Barbuda	10.18	
3rd place, bronze medalist(s)	Henry Vizcaíno	Cuba	10.34	
4	Rodney Green	Bahamas	10.34	
5	Tyrell Cuffy	Cayman Islands	10.41	
6	Daniel Grueso	Colombia	10.41	
7	Lerone Clarke	Jamaica	10.45	
8	Adrian Griffith	Bahamas	10.51	

=== 200 meters ===
Heats – July 5
Wind:
Heat 1: +1.5 m/s, Heat 2: +2.2 m/s, Heat 3: +1.1 m/s, Heat 4: +1.0 m/s, Heat 5: +0.9 m/s

Rank	Heat	Name	Nationality	Time	Notes
1	5	Xavier Brown	Jamaica	20.56	Q
2	5	Chris Lloyd	Dominica	20.60	Q
3	1	José Eduardo Acevedo	Venezuela	20.65	Q
4	4	Jamial Rolle	Bahamas	20.72	Q
5	3	Yunier Pérez	Cuba	20.75	Q
6	5	Emmanuel Callender	Trinidad and Tobago	20.81	q
7	1	Tyrell Cuffy	Cayman Islands	20.83	Q, NR
8	1	Henry Vizcaíno	Cuba	20.91	q
9	4	Ramon Gittens	Barbados	20.94	q
10	5	Dominic Demeritte	Bahamas	20.95	q
11	3	Rondel Sorrillo	Trinidad and Tobago	20.99	Q
12	4	Rolando Palacios	Honduras	20.99	q, NR
13	5	Roudy Monrose	Haiti	20.99	q
14	2	Adrian Durant	United States Virgin Islands	21.04	Q
15	2	Erison Hurtault	Dominica	21.04	Q
16	4	Delwayne Delaney	Saint Kitts and Nevis	21.08	
17	1	Tabarie Henry	United States Virgin Islands	21.20	
18	5	Joel Hernández	Dominican Republic	21.21	
19	3	Geiner Mosquera	Colombia	21.24	
19	5	Ronald Amaya	Venezuela	21.24	
21	2	Richard Richardson	Antigua and Barbuda	21.25	
22	2	Gustavo Cuesta	Dominican Republic	21.26	
23	1	Pablo Jiménez	Mexico	21.63	
24	1	Daniel Bailey	Antigua and Barbuda	21.71	
25	3	Miguel Abarca	Mexico	21.82	
26	1	Lee Prowell	Guyana	21.84	
27	4	Jevon Claxton	Saint Kitts and Nevis	21.88	
28	2	Jeremy Bascom	Guyana	22.13	
29	3	Juan Miguel Zeledón	Nicaragua	22.95	
	4	Cristián Reyes*	Chile	20.85	Q
	2	Daniel Grueso	Colombia	DQ	

Semi-finals – July 5
Wind:
Heat 1: +1.1 m/s, Heat 2: +2.1 m/s

Rank	Heat	Name	Nationality	Time	Notes
1	1	Chris Lloyd	Dominica	20.53	Q
2	2	Xavier Brown	Jamaica	20.67	Q
3	1	Emmanuel Callender	Trinidad and Tobago	20.77	Q
4	1	José Eduardo Acevedo	Venezuela	20.78	Q
5	2	Rondel Sorrillo	Trinidad and Tobago	20.84	Q
6	2	Yunier Pérez	Cuba	20.85	Q
7	1	Jamial Rolle	Bahamas	20.93	q
8	1	Rolando Palacios	Honduras	20.95	q, NR
9	2	Tyrell Cuffy	Cayman Islands	20.97	
10	2	Adrian Durant	United States Virgin Islands	21.00	
11	1	Roudy Monrose	Haiti	21.03	
12	2	Erison Hurtault	Dominica	21.22	
13	1	Dominic Demeritte	Bahamas	21.37	
14	2	Henry Vizcaíno	Cuba	21.37	
	1	Cristián Reyes*	Chile	21.07	
	2	Ramon Gittens	Barbados	DNS	

Final – July 4
Wind: +0.5 m/s

Rank	Name	Nationality	Time	Notes
1st place, gold medalist(s)	Emmanuel Callender	Trinidad and Tobago	20.69	
2nd place, silver medalist(s)	Rondel Sorrillo	Trinidad and Tobago	20.71	
3rd place, bronze medalist(s)	José Eduardo Acevedo	Venezuela	20.79	
4	Yunier Pérez	Cuba	20.84	
5	Chris Lloyd	Dominica	20.85	
6	Xavier Brown	Jamaica	20.88	
7	Jamial Rolle	Bahamas	20.90	
8	Rolando Palacios	Honduras	21.09	

=== 400 meters ===
Heats – July 5

Rank	Heat	Name	Nationality	Time	Notes
1	1	Andrae Williams	Bahamas	45.63	Q
2	2	Michael Mathieu	Bahamas	45.79	Q
3	2	Williams Collazo	Cuba	45.90	Q
4	3	Renny Quow	Trinidad and Tobago	46.02	Q
5	2	Kelvin Herrera	Dominican Republic	46.24	q
6	3	Omar Cisneros	Cuba	46.27	Q
7	1	Luis Luna	Venezuela	46.55	Q
8	1	Tabarie Henry	United States Virgin Islands	46.70	q
9	3	Joel Phillip	Grenada	46.87	
10	2	Félix Martínez	Puerto Rico	46.93	
11	2	Héctor Carrasquillo	Puerto Rico	47.17	
12	3	Larry Inanga	Saint Kitts and Nevis	47.39	
13	2	Freddy Mezones	Venezuela	47.48	
14	2	Geiner Mosquera	Colombia	47.57	
15	2	Ramón Frías	Dominican Republic	47.71	
16	1	Takeshi Fujiwara	El Salvador	47.88	
17	2	Jevon Claxton	Saint Kitts and Nevis	48.32	
18	3	Joseph Bazil	Dominica	48.45	

Final – July 4

Rank	Name	Nationality	Time	Notes
1st place, gold medalist(s)	Renny Quow	Trinidad and Tobago	45.27	
2nd place, silver medalist(s)	Michael Mathieu	Bahamas	45.66	
3rd place, bronze medalist(s)	Omar Cisneros	Cuba	45.98	
4	Williams Collazo	Cuba	46.04	
5	Andrae Williams	Bahamas	46.09	
6	Luis Luna	Venezuela	46.68	
7	Kelvin Herrera	Dominican Republic	47.06	
	Tabarie Henry	United States Virgin Islands	DNF	

=== 800 meters ===
Heats – July 5

Rank	Heat	Name	Nationality	Time	Notes
1	3	Juan Pablo Solares	Mexico	1:47.18	Q
2	3	Andy González	Cuba	1:48.77	Q
3	2	Moise Joseph	Haiti	1:48.87	Q
4	2	Maury Surel Castillo	Cuba	1:49.85	Q
5	1	Eduard Villanueva	Venezuela	1:49.89	Q
6	1	David Freeman	Puerto Rico	1:49.90	Q
7	3	Terry Charles	United States Virgin Islands	1:50.23	q, NR
8	2	Nico Herrera	Venezuela	1:50.25	q
9	2	Jamaal James	Trinidad and Tobago	1:51.30	
10	2	Deon Bascom	Guyana	1:51.62	
11	1	Heleodoro Navarro	Mexico	1:52.20	
12	1	Frank Bobadilla	Dominican Republic	1:52.45	
13	1	Alexis Roberts	Bahamas	1:52.85	
14	3	Michael Donawa	Bermuda	1:55.11	
15	1	Freddy Espinoza	Colombia	1:55.93	
16	1	Jenner Pelicó	Guatemala	1:56.88	
17	3	O'Neil Williams	Bahamas	1:59.54	

Final – July 6

Rank	Name	Nationality	Time	Notes
1st place, gold medalist(s)	Andy González	Cuba	1:46.11	CR
2nd place, silver medalist(s)	Eduard Villanueva	Venezuela	1:46.92	
3rd place, bronze medalist(s)	Juan Pablo Solares	Mexico	1:47.18	
4	Moise Joseph	Haiti	1:48.62	
5	Nico Herrera	Venezuela	1:48.85	
6	David Freeman	Puerto Rico	1:49.32	
7	Terry Charles	United States Virgin Islands	1:49.50	NR
8	Maury Surel Castillo	Cuba	2:04.06	

=== 1500 meters ===
July 5

Rank	Name	Nationality	Time	Notes
1st place, gold medalist(s)	Isaías Haro	Mexico	3:45.15	
2nd place, silver medalist(s)	Nico Herrera	Venezuela	3:45.39	
3rd place, bronze medalist(s)	Maury Surel Castillo	Cuba	3:47.17	
4	Alonso Pérez	Colombia	3:47.72	
5	Freddy Espinoza	Colombia	3:52.26	
6	O'Neil Williams	Bahamas	3:56.83	
7	Jenner Pelicó	Guatemala	4:01.14	
8	Frank Bobadilla	Dominican Republic	4:02.53	

=== 5000 meters ===
July 6

Rank	Name	Nationality	Time	Notes
1st place, gold medalist(s)	Jhon Tello	Colombia	14:21.21	
2nd place, silver medalist(s)	Isaías Haro	Mexico	14:35.81	
3rd place, bronze medalist(s)	Javier Guarín	Colombia	15:10.58	
4	Richard Rodríguez	Aruba	16:44.73	

=== 10,000 meters ===
July 4

Rank	Name	Nationality	Time	Notes
1st place, gold medalist(s)	William Naranjo	Colombia	29:30.29	
2nd place, silver medalist(s)	Diego Colorado	Colombia	29:41.88	

=== 110 meters hurdles ===
Heats – July 5
Wind:
Heat 1: –0.5 m/s, Heat 2: +1.9 m/s

Rank	Heat	Name	Nationality	Time	Notes
1	2	Ryan Brathwaite	Barbados	13.49	Q, NR
2	2	Héctor Cotto	Puerto Rico	13.61	Q
3	1	Shamar Sands	Bahamas	13.68	Q
4	2	Mikel Thomas	Trinidad and Tobago	13.72	Q
5	2	Ronald Forbes	Cayman Islands	13.73	q
6	2	Paulo Villar	Colombia	13.76	q
7	1	Decosma Wright	Jamaica	13.78	Q
8	2	Christopher Bethel	Bahamas	14.07	
9	2	Dudley Dorival	Haiti	14.09	
10	1	Ronald Beneth	Honduras	14.12	
11	1	Ramón Sosa	Dominican Republic	14.32	
12	2	Yasmani Copello	Cuba	14.35	
13	1	Joseph Dawayne	Panama	14.59	
14	1	Alberto Cabanillas	Mexico	15.35	
15	1	Renan Palma	El Salvador	17.09	
	1	Renan Palma	Puerto Rico	DQ	

Final – July 5
Wind:
+2.3 m/s

Rank	Name	Nationality	Time	Notes
1st place, gold medalist(s)	Shamar Sands	Bahamas	13.32	
2nd place, silver medalist(s)	Paulo Villar	Colombia	13.45	
3rd place, bronze medalist(s)	Héctor Cotto	Puerto Rico	13.55	
4	Ryan Brathwaite	Barbados	13.66	
5	Ronald Forbes	Cayman Islands	13.71	
6	Mikel Thomas	Trinidad and Tobago	13.84	
7	Decosma Wright	Jamaica	14.04	
	Enrique Llanos	Puerto Rico	DQ	

=== 400 meters hurdles ===
Heats – July 4

Rank	Heat	Name	Nationality	Time	Notes
1	1	Isa Phillips	Jamaica	50.47	Q
2	1	Yasmani Copello	Cuba	50.89	Q
3	1	Víctor Solarte	Venezuela	51.32	Q
4	1	Juan Pablo Maturana	Colombia	51.36	q
5	2	Yeison Rivas	Colombia	51.51	Q
6	2	Yimy López	Dominican Republic	51.79	Q
7	2	Allan Ayala	Guatemala	51.93	Q
8	2	José Manuel Céspedes	Venezuela	52.26	q
9	1	Camilo Quevedo	Guatemala	52.30	
10	2	Carlyle Thompson	Bahamas	52.64	
11	1	Bayano Kamani	Panama	56.45	

Final – July 4

Rank	Name	Nationality	Time	Notes
1st place, gold medalist(s)	Isa Phillips	Jamaica	49.98	
2nd place, silver medalist(s)	Yasmani Copello	Cuba	50.08	
3rd place, bronze medalist(s)	Yeison Rivas	Colombia	50.44	
4	Víctor Solarte	Venezuela	51.40	
5	Yimy López	Dominican Republic	51.72	
6	Allan Ayala	Guatemala	52.70	
7	Juan Pablo Maturana	Colombia	53.09	
	José Manuel Céspedes	Venezuela	DNF	

=== 3000 meters steeplechase ===
July 6

Rank	Name	Nationality	Time	Notes
1st place, gold medalist(s)	José Alberto Sánchez	Cuba	8:53.24	
2nd place, silver medalist(s)	Alexander Greaux	Puerto Rico	9:12.70	
3rd place, bronze medalist(s)	Yovanni Adame	Dominican Republic	9:15.72	
4	Gerald Giraldo	Colombia	9:40.17	

=== 4 x 100 meters relay ===
July 5

Rank	Nation	Competitors	Time	Notes
1st place, gold medalist(s)	Trinidad and Tobago	Keston Bledman, Marc Burns, Aaron Armstrong, Richard Thompson	38.54	
2nd place, silver medalist(s)	Bahamas	Adrian Griffith, Derrick Atkins, Rodney Green, Shamar Sands	39.22	
3rd place, bronze medalist(s)	Saint Kitts and Nevis	Jason Rogers, Larry Inanga, Jevon Claxton, Delwayne Delaney	40.81	
4	Cayman Islands	Robert Ibeh, Carl Morgan, Stephen Johnson, Carlos Morgan	41.26	
5	Dominican Republic	Irving Guerrero, Joel Báez, Wilfredo Juan, Jean Carlos Peguero	41.65	

=== 4 x 400 meters relay ===
July 6

Rank	Nation	Competitors	Time	Notes
1st place, gold medalist(s)	Cuba	Williams Collazo, Yunier Pérez, Omar Cisneros, Yeimer López	3:02.10	
2nd place, silver medalist(s)	Bahamas	Ramon Miller, Michael Mathieu, Avard Moncur, Andretti Bain	3:02.48	
3rd place, bronze medalist(s)	Trinidad and Tobago	Renny Quow, Cowin Mills, Ade Alleyne-Forte, Stann Waithe	3:04.12	
4	Venezuela	Freddy Mezones, Víctor Solarte, José Acevedo, Luis Luna	3:06.10	
5	Colombia	Daniel Grueso, Yeison Rivas, Javier Mosquera, Geiner Mosquera	3:06.23	
6	Puerto Rico	Héctor Carrasquillo, Javier Culson, Christian Santiago, Félix Martínez	3:07.51	
7	Dominican Republic	Ramón Frías, Kelvin Herrera, Joel Hernández, Gustavo Cuesta	3:08.08	
8	Dominica	Joseph Bazil, Erison Hurtault, Smith Telemaque, Chris Lloyd	3:11.06	NR

=== 20,000 meters walk ===
July 5

Rank	Name	Nationality	Time	Notes
1st place, gold medalist(s)	James Rendón	Colombia	1:25:22.7	
2nd place, silver medalist(s)	Allan Segura	Costa Rica	1:27:57.2	
3rd place, bronze medalist(s)	Claudio Erasmo Vargas	Mexico	1:28:51.6	
4	José Javier Sánchez	Mexico	1:30:16.2	
5	Aníbal Paau	Guatemala	1:36:25.0	
6	Juan Carlos Rodríguez	Puerto Rico	1:49:36.0	
	Jefferson Pérez*	Ecuador	1:20:54.9	

=== High jump ===
July 6

Rank	Athlete	Nationality	1.95	2.00	2.05	2.10	2.13	2.16	2.19	2.22	2.25	2.31	Result	Notes
1st place, gold medalist(s)	Víctor Moya	Cuba	–	–	–	–	o	–	o	–	o	xx–	2.25	
2nd place, silver medalist(s)	Trevor Barry	Bahamas	–	–	–	o	o	–	o	o	xo	xxx	2.25	
3rd place, bronze medalist(s)	Jamal Wilson	Bahamas	–	–	–	o	xo	–	xxx				2.13	
4	Abdiel Ruiz	Puerto Rico	o	o	o	o	–	xxx					2.10	
5	Gilmar Mayo	Colombia	–	–	–	o	–	xxx					2.10	
6	Deon Brangman	Bermuda	–	o	o	xx–	x						2.05	
6	Brandon Williams	Dominica	–	–	o	xxx							2.05	
8	Kevin Huggins	Trinidad and Tobago	o	xo	o	xxx							2.05	
9	Wanner Miller	Colombia	–	–	xo	xxx							2.05	

=== Pole vault ===
July 4

Rank	Athlete	Nationality	4.60	4.70	4.80	4.90	5.00	5.10	5.30	5.50	5.62	Result	Notes
1st place, gold medalist(s)	Lázaro Borges	Cuba	–	–	–	–	–	o	xo	o	xxx	5.50	
2nd place, silver medalist(s)	Dominic Johnson	Saint Lucia	–	–	–	–	o	–	xo	xxx		5.30	
3rd place, bronze medalist(s)	Natanael Semeis	Dominican Republic	o	o	xo	xxx						4.80	
4	Yeisel Cintrón	Puerto Rico	–	o	xxx							4.70	
5	David Ocoró	Colombia	xxo	xxx								4.60	
	César Lucumí	Colombia	xxx									NM	

=== Long jump ===
July 6

Rank	Athlete	Nationality	#1	#2	#3	#4	#5	$6	Result	Notes
1st place, gold medalist(s)	Wilfredo Martínez	Cuba	7.93	x	8.31	8.14w	8.04	7.43	8.31	CR
2nd place, silver medalist(s)	Herbert McGregor	Jamaica	x	7.80	7.67	7.90	7.67w	x	7.90	
3rd place, bronze medalist(s)	Tyrone Smith	Bermuda	x	7.80	x	7.69	7.78	x	7.80	
4	Julian Reid	Jamaica	7.51	7.62	7.76	7.56	7.54	x	7.76	
5	Osbourne Moxey	Bahamas	7.27	7.58	7.59	7.49	7.68w	7.44	7.68w	
6	Carl Morgan	Cayman Islands	x	7.60	x	x	5.77w	x	7.60	
7	Cleavon Dillon	Trinidad and Tobago	7.06	7.47	7.28	7.39	x	7.13w	7.47	
8	Héctor Dairo Fuentes	Cuba	7.44	x	x	–	–	–	7.44	
9	Marco Ibargüen	Colombia	x	7.38	x				7.38	
10	Carlos Jorge	Dominican Republic	7.25	x	7.36				7.36	
11	Esteban Copland	Venezuela	7.23	7.00	7.35				7.35	
12	Joseph Pemberton	Saint Kitts and Nevis	7.35	–	7.20w				7.35	
13	Clayton Latham	Saint Vincent and the Grenadines	6.98	6.96	7.32				7.32	
14	Stephen Johnson	Cayman Islands	5.01	7.20	5.41				7.20	
15	Leon Hunt	United States Virgin Islands	6.67	7.13	6.78				7.13	
16	Calvert Chiverton	Saint Kitts and Nevis	6.59	6.67	x				6.67	
	Rudon Bastian	Bahamas	x	x	x				NM	

=== Triple jump ===
July 5

Rank	Athlete	Nationality	#1	#2	#3	#4	#5	$6	Result	Notes
1st place, gold medalist(s)	Leevan Sands	Bahamas	16.83	x	x	17.29	–	–	17.29	CR
2nd place, silver medalist(s)	Héctor Dairo Fuentes	Cuba	17.23	x	x	–	16.43	16.79	17.23	
3rd place, bronze medalist(s)	Alexis Copello	Cuba	16.68	x	16.68	16.91	x	16.90	16.91	
4	Jhon Murillo	Colombia	15.57	16.02	–	x	–	–	16.02	
5	Antonio Saunders	Bahamas	15.28	15.26	x	–	15.45	14.15	15.45	
6	Carl Morgan	Cayman Islands	15.40	15.03	x	14.86	x	15.03	15.40	
7	Juan Carlos Nájera	Guatemala	x	x	15.24	x	x	x	15.24	
	Marvin García	Guatemala	x	x	x				NM	
	Leon Hunt	United States Virgin Islands	x	x	x				NM	

=== Shot put ===
July 6

Rank	Athlete	Nationality	#1	#2	#3	#4	#5	$6	Result	Notes
1st place, gold medalist(s)	Alexis Paumier	Cuba	x	19.60	x	x	x	x	19.60	
2nd place, silver medalist(s)	Manuel Repollet	Puerto Rico	18.05	x	18.43	x	17.80	x	18.43	
3rd place, bronze medalist(s)	Jiovanny García	Colombia	17.70	17.44	17.52	17.62	17.67	17.55	17.70	
4	Tyron Benjamin	Dominica	16.60	16.65	16.80	16.49	16.84	16.85	16.85	
5	Adonson Shallow	Saint Vincent and the Grenadines	x	x	14.65	x	15.70	15.94	15.94	

=== Discus throw ===
July 4

Rank	Athlete	Nationality	#1	#2	#3	#4	#5	$6	Result	Notes
1st place, gold medalist(s)	Jorge Fernández	Cuba	58.55	58.60	x	x	x	56.52	58.60	
2nd place, silver medalist(s)	Yunio Lastre	Cuba	57.67	58.00	55.70	x	x	x	58.00	
3rd place, bronze medalist(s)	Jesús Parejo	Venezuela	56.49	x	55.73	55.05	55.29	x	56.49	
4	Hickel Woolery	Jamaica	55.60	x	53.92	x	x	52.74	55.60	
5	Adonson Shallow	Saint Vincent and the Grenadines	x	48.30	52.69	x	50.25	x	52.69	
6	Eric Mathias	British Virgin Islands	x	45.27	x	49.90	x	43.71	49.90	
7	Tyron Benjamin	Dominica	x	49.51	49.33	41.23	46.47	48.36	49.51	

=== Hammer throw ===
July 6

Rank	Athlete	Nationality	#1	#2	#3	#4	#5	$6	Result	Notes
1st place, gold medalist(s)	Noleysi Bicet	Cuba	69.97	70.74	71.61	70.61	68.49	67.22	71.61	
2nd place, silver medalist(s)	Luis García	Mexico	65.68	x	x	66.36	x	x	66.36	
3rd place, bronze medalist(s)	Raúl Rivera	Guatemala	x	60.77	62.27	61.90	62.26	64.58	64.58	
4	Freiman Arias	Colombia	60.12	x	x	60.14	61.36	60.62	61.36	
5	Diego Berríos	Guatemala	54.95	x	56.23	x	57.67	55.91	57.67	
6	Michael Letterlough	Cayman Islands	51.71	57.59	x	x	57.06	x	57.59	
7	Jacobo D'León	Colombia	x	x	x	x	x	49.23	49.23	

=== Javelin throw ===
July 6

Rank	Athlete	Nationality	#1	#2	#3	#4	#5	$6	Result	Notes
1st place, gold medalist(s)	Annier Boué	Cuba	74.98	69.70	–	71.59	71.76	72.92	74.98	
2nd place, silver medalist(s)	Dayron Márquez	Colombia	64.77	73.53	x	70.78	74.37	68.76	74.37	
3rd place, bronze medalist(s)	Jhonny Viáfara	Colombia	67.77	64.44	71.07	65.89	65.98	68.84	71.07	
4	Juan José Méndez	Mexico	x	54.56	59.93	63.32	63.79	65.03	65.03	
5	Albert Reynolds	Saint Lucia	60.83	x	60.72	60.83	64.53	59.37	64.53	
6	Samer Connor	Anguilla	x	55.08	56.02	54.37	59.73	x	59.73	NR
7	Felipe Ortiz	Puerto Rico	55.75	x	x	52.04	56.86	58.28	58.28	
8	Andy Baron	Dominica	55.34	53.29	48.41	50.65	52.37	–	55.34	
9	Kerron Brown	Trinidad and Tobago	x	51.88	x				51.88	

=== Decathlon ===
July 4–5

The highest mark recorded in each event is highlighted in yellow

Rank	Athlete	Nationality	100m	LJ	SP	HJ	400m	110m H	DT	PV	JT	1500m	Points	Notes
1st place, gold medalist(s)	Yosley Azcuy	Cuba	11.09	7.10	13.10	1.90	51.24	14.64	42.94	4.50	58.40	5:12.36	7408	
2nd place, silver medalist(s)	Steven Marrero	Puerto Rico	11.45	6.98	13.85	1.81	49.27	16.17	44.01	4.60	53.26	4:47.41	7297	
3rd place, bronze medalist(s)	Andrés Mantilla	Colombia	11.17	6.67	13.58	1.90	52.10	14.89	43.62	4.30	49.64	4:56.20	7164	
4	Marcos Sánchez	Puerto Rico	11.12	6.72	13.72	1.96	49.82	15.67	42.14	4.20	51.31	5:13.26	7128	
5	Octavious Gillespie	Guatemala	11.82	6.74	12.84	1.99	54.82	15.59	41.27	NM	60.04	5:09.82	6210	
	Adolphus Jones	Saint Kitts and Nevis	11.43	6.82	10.99	2.11	50.07	DNS	–	–	–	–	DNF	
	Claston Bernard	Jamaica	10.89	6.97	10.99	NM	DNS	DNF	DNS	–	–	–	DNF	

== Women's results ==
=== 100 meters ===
Heats – July 4
Wind:
Heat 1: +0.9 m/s, Heat 2: +1.3 m/s, Heat 3: +0.8 m/s

Rank	Heat	Name	Nationality	Time	Notes
1	1	Barbara Pierre	Haiti	11.45	Q
2	1	Virgil Hodge	Saint Kitts and Nevis	11.50	Q
3	1	Mirtha Brock	Colombia	11.61	
4	1	Semoy Hackett	Trinidad and Tobago	11.72	
5	1	Ruth Bustamante	Dominican Republic	11.73	
6	1	Corney Patterson	United States Virgin Islands	11.81	
7	1	Celiangeli Morales	Puerto Rico	11.87	
1	2	Chandra Sturrup	Bahamas	11.14	Q
2	2	Yomara Hinestroza	Colombia	11.41	Q
3	2	Sherry Fletcher	Grenada	11.46	q
4	2	Ayanna Hutchinson	Trinidad and Tobago	11.51	
5	2	Shakera Reece	Barbados	11.74	
6	2	Sonia Williams	Antigua and Barbuda	11.84	
1	3	Allison George	Grenada	11.2	Q
2	3	Aleen Bailey	Jamaica	11.2	Q
2	3	Virgen Benavides	Cuba	11.2	Q
4	3	Valma Bass	United States Virgin Islands	11.3	
5	3	Beatriz Cruz	Puerto Rico	11.5	
6	3	Tamicka Clarke	Bahamas	11.6	
7	3	Liann Kellman	Barbados	11.7	
	3	Mariely Sánchez	Dominican Republic	DQ	

Final – July 4
Wind:
+1.2 m/s

Rank	Name	Nationality	Time	Notes
1st place, gold medalist(s)	Chandra Sturrup	Bahamas	11.20	
2nd place, silver medalist(s)	Sherry Fletcher	Grenada	11.39	
3rd place, bronze medalist(s)	Barbara Pierre	Haiti	11.40	
4	Aleen Bailey	Jamaica	11.43	
5	Virgil Hodge	Saint Kitts and Nevis	11.44	
6	Yomara Hinestroza	Colombia	11.51	
7	Allison George	Grenada	11.53	
8	Virgen Benavides	Cuba	11.55	

=== 200 meters ===
Heats – July 5
Wind:
Heat 1: +0.7 m/s, Heat 2: +0.1 m/s

Rank	Heat	Name	Nationality	Time	Notes
1	2	Roxana Díaz	Cuba	22.92	Q
2	1	Debbie Ferguson-McKenzie	Bahamas	23.06	Q
3	2	Darlenys Obregón	Colombia	23.09	Q
4	1	Aleen Bailey	Jamaica	23.20	Q
5	2	Christine Amertil	Bahamas	23.22	Q
6	1	Virgil Hodge	Saint Kitts and Nevis	23.46	Q
7	2	Allison George	Grenada	23.48	q
8	1	Jade Bailey	Barbados	23.63	q
9	2	Valma Bass	United States Virgin Islands	23.67	
10	1	Felipa Palacios	Colombia	23.71	
11	2	Wilmary Álvarez	Venezuela	23.87	
12	1	Daisurami Bonne	Cuba	23.90	
13	2	Mariely Sánchez	Dominican Republic	24.00	
14	1	Sherry Fletcher	Grenada	24.16	
15	1	Diana Taylor	Dominican Republic	24.32	

Final – July 6
Wind:
+0.3 m/s

Rank	Name	Nationality	Time	Notes
1st place, gold medalist(s)	Debbie Ferguson-McKenzie	Bahamas	22.78	
2nd place, silver medalist(s)	Roxana Díaz	Cuba	22.82	
3rd place, bronze medalist(s)	Darlenys Obregón	Colombia	23.13	
4	Allison George	Grenada	23.15	
5	Christine Amertil	Bahamas	23.28	
6	Aleen Bailey	Jamaica	23.34	
7	Virgil Hodge	Saint Kitts and Nevis	23.42	
8	Jade Bailey	Barbados	23.51	

=== 400 meters ===
Heats – July 4

Rank	Heat	Name	Nationality	Time	Notes
1	2	Indira Terrero	Cuba	51.31	Q
2	1	Gabriela Medina	Mexico	51.43	Q
3	1	Sonita Sutherland	Jamaica	51.57	Q
4	1	Diosmely Peña	Cuba	51.88	q
5	2	Zudikey Rodríguez	Mexico	51.95	Q
6	1	Ginou Etienne	Haiti	52.03	q
7	1	Aliann Pompey	Guyana	52.08	
8	3	Christine Amertil	Bahamas	52.11	Q
9	3	Tiandra Ponteen	Saint Kitts and Nevis	52.33	Q
10	2	Moya Thompson	Jamaica	52.43	
11	3	Kineke Alexander	Saint Vincent and the Grenadines	52.68	
12	2	Norma González	Colombia	53.51	
13	3	Carol Rodríguez	Puerto Rico	53.64	
14	2	Trish Bartholomew	Grenada	53.65	
15	2	Wilmary Álvarez	Venezuela	54.12	
16	1	María Idrobo	Colombia	54.57	
17	3	Hazel-Ann Regis	Grenada	54.72	
18	1	Shakeitha Henfield	Bahamas	54.83	
19	3	Samaria del Rosario	Dominican Republic	55.24	
20	2	Dominique Maloney	British Virgin Islands	55.65	
21	1	Ana Díaz	Dominican Republic	56.59	
22	3	Jessica Aguilera	Nicaragua	59.18	

Final – July 4

Rank	Name	Nationality	Time	Notes
1st place, gold medalist(s)	Indira Terrero	Cuba	50.98	
2nd place, silver medalist(s)	Gabriela Medina	Mexico	51.78	
3rd place, bronze medalist(s)	Ginou Etienne	Haiti	52.20	
4	Christine Amertil	Bahamas	52.27	
5	Diosmely Peña	Cuba	52.58	
6	Tiandra Ponteen	Saint Kitts and Nevis	52.74	
7	Sonita Sutherland	Jamaica	52.79	
8	Zudikey Rodríguez	Mexico	52.95	

=== 800 meters ===
July 6

Rank	Name	Nationality	Time	Notes
1st place, gold medalist(s)	Rosibel García	Colombia	2:05.9	
2nd place, silver medalist(s)	Sheena Gooding	Barbados	2:06.6	
3rd place, bronze medalist(s)	Cristina Guevara	Mexico	2:07.2	
4	Muriel Coneo	Colombia	2:07.7	
5	Lizaira del Valle	Puerto Rico	2:07.9	
6	Yanelis Lara	Cuba	2:08.2	
7	Francisca Green	Dominican Republic	2:09.2	
8	Madeleine Rondón	Venezuela	2:10.0	
9	Julian Reynolds	Jamaica	2:11.1	
10	Yahaira Pérez	Dominican Republic	2:12.8	
11	Gladys Landaverde	El Salvador	2:15.4	
12	Brenda Salmerón	El Salvador	2:17.4	

=== 1500 meters ===
July 5

Rank	Name	Nationality	Time	Notes
1st place, gold medalist(s)	Rosibel García	Colombia	4:24.62	
2nd place, silver medalist(s)	Yamilé Alaluf	Mexico	4:25.43	
3rd place, bronze medalist(s)	Muriel Coneo	Colombia	4:28.92	
4	Gladys Landaverde	El Salvador	4:46.17	
5	Brenda Salmerón	El Salvador	4:49.83	

=== 5000 meters ===
July 6

Rank	Name	Nationality	Time	Notes
1st place, gold medalist(s)	Nora Rocha	Mexico	16:41.27	
2nd place, silver medalist(s)	Bertha Sánchez	Colombia	16:43.82	
3rd place, bronze medalist(s)	María Montilla	Venezuela	16:53.42	
4	Carolina Tabares	Colombia	16:55.46	
5	Yamilé Alaluf	Mexico	17:30.25	
6	Zenaida Maldonado	Puerto Rico	17:47.76	
7	Carmen Valles	Puerto Rico	18:08.04	

=== 10,000 meters ===
July 4

Rank	Name	Nationality	Time	Notes
1st place, gold medalist(s)	Bertha Sánchez	Colombia	35:16.36	
2nd place, silver medalist(s)	María Montilla	Venezuela	35:42.18	
3rd place, bronze medalist(s)	Andreina de la Rosa	Dominican Republic	36:43.36	
	Carmen Valles	Puerto Rico	DNF	

=== 100 meters hurdles ===
Heats – July 4
Wind:
Heat 1: +2.3 m/s, Heat 2: +1.5 m/s

Rank	Heat	Name	Nationality	Time	Notes
1	1	Anay Tejeda	Cuba	12.60	Q
2	1	Aleesha Barber	Trinidad and Tobago	13.01	Q
3	2	Yenima Arencibia	Cuba	13.09	Q
4	2	Nadine Faustin-Parker	Haiti	13.15	Q
5	2	Josanne Lucas	Trinidad and Tobago	13.20	Q
6	1	Briggite Merlano	Colombia	13.23	Q
7	2	Princesa Oliveros	Colombia	13.64	q
8	1	Tiavannia Thompson	Bahamas	13.80	q
9	1	Violeta Ávila	Mexico	13.98	

Final – July 5
Wind:
+1.4 m/s

Rank	Name	Nationality	Time	Notes
1st place, gold medalist(s)	Anay Tejeda	Cuba	12.61	CR, NR
2nd place, silver medalist(s)	Yenima Arencibia	Cuba	12.95	
3rd place, bronze medalist(s)	Aleesha Barber	Trinidad and Tobago	12.98	NR
4	Nadine Faustin-Parker	Haiti	12.99	
5	Briggite Merlano	Colombia	13.22	
6	Josanne Lucas	Trinidad and Tobago	13.46	
7	Tiavannia Thompson	Bahamas	13.61	
8	Princesa Oliveros	Colombia	13.90	

=== 400 meters hurdles ===
July 4

Rank	Name	Nationality	Time	Notes
1st place, gold medalist(s)	Josanne Lucas	Trinidad and Tobago	56.55	
2nd place, silver medalist(s)	Princesa Oliveros	Colombia	57.44	
3rd place, bronze medalist(s)	Yolanda Osana	Dominican Republic	58.91	
4	Keila Escobar	Colombia	1:02.81	
5	Jessica Aguilera	Nicaragua	1:03.00	

=== 3000 meters steeplechase ===
July 5

Rank	Name	Nationality	Time	Notes
1st place, gold medalist(s)	Ángela Figueroa	Colombia	10:18.23	
2nd place, silver medalist(s)	Milena Pérez	Cuba	10:45.46	
3rd place, bronze medalist(s)	Sonny García	Dominican Republic	12:16.51	

=== 4 x 100 meters relay ===
July 5

Rank	Nation	Competitors	Time	Notes
1st place, gold medalist(s)	Trinidad and Tobago	Semoy Hackett, Ayanna Hutchinson, Sasha Springer-Jones, Kelly-Ann Baptiste	43.43	NR
2nd place, silver medalist(s)	Colombia	Mirtha Brock, Felipa Palacios, Darlenys Obregón, Yomara Hinestroza	43.56	
3rd place, bronze medalist(s)	Bahamas	Kristy Whie, Chandra Sturrup, Tamicka Clarke, Debbie Ferguson-McKenzie	44.03	
4	Puerto Rico	Beatriz Cruz, Celiangeli Morales, Jennifer Gutiérrez, Carol Rodríguez	44.34	
5	Dominican Republic	Wendy Reinoso, Ruth Bustamante, Yolanda Osana, Mariely Sánchez	45.45	
	Brazil*	Rosemar Coelho Neto, Lucimar de Moura, Thaissa Presti, Franciela Krasucki	43.69	
	Haiti		DQ	

=== 4 x 400 meters relay ===
July 6

Rank	Nation	Competitors	Time	Notes
1st place, gold medalist(s)	Cuba	Aymée Martínez, Diosmely Peña, Daisurami Bonne, Indira Terrero	3:27.97	
2nd place, silver medalist(s)	Mexico	María Teresa Rugerio, Gabriela Medina, Nallely Vela, Zudikey Rodríguez	3:29.94	
3rd place, bronze medalist(s)	Bahamas	Sasha Rolle, Christine Amertil, Shakeitha Henfield, Crystal Strachan	3:35.57	
4	Colombia	Princesa Oliveros, María Idrobo, Keila Escobar, Norma González	3:39.45	
5	Dominican Republic	Samaria del Rosario, Yolanda Osana, Francisca Green, Diana Taylor	3:42.58	
	Brazil*	Maria Laura Almirão, Lucimar Teodoro, Josiane Tito, Emmily Pinheiro	3:29.11	

=== 10,000 meters walk ===
July 5

Rank	Name	Nationality	Time	Notes
1st place, gold medalist(s)	Claudia Ortega	Mexico	50:10.37	
2nd place, silver medalist(s)	Milángela Rosales	Venezuela	51:06.83	
3rd place, bronze medalist(s)	Ingrid Hernández	Colombia	52:44.84	
	María Esther Sánchez	Mexico	DNF	
	Milexsis Sepúlveda	Puerto Rico	DNF	
	Sandra Zapata	Colombia	DNF	

=== High jump ===
July 5

Rank	Athlete	Nationality	1.55	1.60	1.65	1.70	1.73	1.76	1.79	1.85	1.88	1.91	1.95	Result	Notes
1st place, gold medalist(s)	Levern Spencer	Saint Lucia	–	–	–	–	–	–	–	o	–	xo	xxx	1.91	
2nd place, silver medalist(s)	Caterine Ibargüen	Colombia	–	–	–	–	–	o	–	o	o	xxx		1.88	
3rd place, bronze medalist(s)	Marierlis Rojas	Venezuela	–	–	–	o	o	o	xo	xxx				1.79	
4	Latroya Darrell	Bermuda	xo	o	xxx									1.60	
	Yarianny Argüelles	Cuba	–	–	–	–	–	–	–	–	–	xxx		NM	

=== Pole vault ===
July 4

Rank	Athlete	Nationality	3.90	4.00	4.10	4.22	Result	Notes
1st place, gold medalist(s)	Milena Agudelo	Colombia	o	o	o	xxx	4.10	
2nd place, silver medalist(s)	Keisa Monterola	Venezuela	xo	o	xxx		4.00	

=== Long jump ===
July 5

Rank	Athlete	Nationality	#1	#2	#3	#4	#5	$6	Result	Notes
1st place, gold medalist(s)	Bianca Stuart	Bahamas	6.54	6.47	6.39	6.48	x	x	6.54	
2nd place, silver medalist(s)	Shara Proctor	Anguilla	6.45	6.31	6.42	6.54	6.34	x	6.54	NR
3rd place, bronze medalist(s)	Charisse Bacchus	Trinidad and Tobago	6.38	6.30	6.49	–	–	–	6.49	
4	Tanika Liburd	Saint Kitts and Nevis	x	6.27	5.84	x	x	6.29	6.29	
5	Jackie Edwards	Bahamas	6.18	5.97	6.28	6.19	6.12	6.28	6.28	
6	Melissa Valencia	Colombia	5.92	6.14	x	6.19	6.17	x	6.19	
7	Claudette Martínez	Mexico	x	x	5.97	x	x	5.98	5.98	
8	Yuridia Bustamante	Mexico	x	5.86	5.82	5.89	5.75	5.92	5.92	
9	Adriana Severino	Dominican Republic	x	5.82	x				5.82	
10	Kathleen James	Saint Vincent and the Grenadines	5.74	5.71	5.72				5.74	

=== Triple jump ===
July 4

Rank	Athlete	Nationality	#1	#2	#3	#4	#5	$6	Result	Notes
1st place, gold medalist(s)	Mabel Gay	Cuba	13.97	14.19	13.28	x	14.12	x	14.19	CR
2nd place, silver medalist(s)	Yarianna Martínez	Cuba	x	13.78	13.81	13.85	13.95	13.95	13.95	
3rd place, bronze medalist(s)	Ayanna Alexander	Trinidad and Tobago	12.83	13.21	13.24	13.30	13.17	13.07	13.30	
4	Verónica Davis	Venezuela	12.46	12.64	13.30	12.92	13.09	13.00	13.30	
5	Johanna Triviño	Colombia	x	x	12.59	12.66	13.24	x	13.24	
6	Caterine Ibargüen	Colombia	13.02	13.04	x	–	–	–	13.04	
7	Shara Proctor	Anguilla	12.96	x	12.99	12.61	12.75	12.37	12.99	
8	Desiree Crichlow	Barbados	x	12.92	12.75	x	x	x	12.92	
9	Donnavette Martin	Bahamas	x	11.73	12.04				12.04	
10	Estefany Cruz	Guatemala	x	x	12.00				12.00	
11	Alicia Florian	Dominican Republic	x	11.99	x				11.99	
12	Latroya Darrell	Bermuda	11.95	11.78	x				11.95	
13	Adriana Severino	Dominican Republic	11.86	x	–				11.86	
14	Seidre Forde	Barbados	x	11.76	x				11.76	

=== Shot put ===
July 5

Rank	Athlete	Nationality	#1	#2	#3	#4	#5	$6	Result	Notes
1st place, gold medalist(s)	Cleopatra Borel-Brown	Trinidad and Tobago	17.74	18.16	18.39	17.95	x	18.12	18.39	
2nd place, silver medalist(s)	Yumileidi Cumbá	Cuba	18.03	18.07	x	x	18.05	18.10	18.10	
3rd place, bronze medalist(s)	Yaniuvis López	Cuba	x	17.87	16.44	17.22	17.76	17.87	17.87	
4	Zara Northover	Jamaica	15.77	16.34	15.36	x	x	14.78	16.34	
5	Keisha Walkes	Barbados	15.85	x	14.84	15.13	x	15.44	15.85	
6	Annie Alexander	Trinidad and Tobago	x	14.54	15.41	x	15.51	x	15.51	
7	Tamara Lechuga	Mexico	x	13.16	x	13.52	x	14.08	14.08	
8	Luz Dary Castro	Colombia	13.37	x	12.74				13.37	

=== Discus throw ===
July 5

Rank	Athlete	Nationality	#1	#2	#3	#4	#5	$6	Result	Notes
1st place, gold medalist(s)	Yarelis Barrios	Cuba	61.33	62.87	61.24	59.55	x	58.62	62.87	
2nd place, silver medalist(s)	Yania Ferrales	Cuba	57.42	58.69	x	x	58.74	x	58.74	
3rd place, bronze medalist(s)	Annie Alexander	Trinidad and Tobago	x	54.56	x	x	x	52.81	54.56	
4	María Cubillán	Venezuela	49.24	46.78	46.70	50.62	x	47.67	50.62	
5	Luz Montaño	Colombia	46.33	x	45.06	44.57	47.81	46.17	47.81	
6	Luz Dary Castro	Colombia	x	47.32	x	x	x	47.54	47.54	
7	Irais Estrada	Mexico	47.32	46.99	46.90	47.23	45.88	44.17	47.32	
8	Shernelle Nicholls	Barbados	45.68	x	x				45.68	
9	Norimar Llanos	Puerto Rico	45.08	43.15	41.57				45.08	
	Karen Gallardo*	Chile	48.89	x	51.46	47.50	50.00	50.86	51.46	

=== Hammer throw ===
July 5

Rank	Athlete	Nationality	#1	#2	#3	#4	#5	$6	Result	Notes
1st place, gold medalist(s)	Candice Scott	Trinidad and Tobago	x	69.26	68.37	x	67.36	63.72	69.26	CR
2nd place, silver medalist(s)	Yunaika Crawford	Cuba	67.52	68.70	69.03	68.09	68.42	68.20	69.03	
3rd place, bronze medalist(s)	Johana Moreno	Colombia	61.54	64.72	67.09	x	64.87	x	67.09	NR
4	Johana Ramírez	Colombia	62.77	x	64.20	60.97	63.27	64.20	64.20	
5	Rosa Rodríguez	Venezuela	x	x	63.76	61.47	59.89	x	63.76	
6	Natalie Grant	Jamaica	57.50	59.72	57.72	58.70	57.88	x	59.72	
7	Caltha Seymour	Jamaica	54.90	56.77	53.70	56.92	52.88	x	56.92	

=== Javelin throw ===
July 5

Rank	Athlete	Nationality	#1	#2	#3	#4	#5	$6	Result	Notes
1st place, gold medalist(s)	Laverne Eve	Bahamas	54.93	56.36	x	x	x	x	56.36	
2nd place, silver medalist(s)	Yanet Cruz	Cuba	54.03	55.11	x	55.20	56.14	52.77	56.14	
3rd place, bronze medalist(s)	Kateema Riettie	Jamaica	49.95	54.85	49.44	54.90	x	x	54.90	
4	María González	Venezuela	49.21	53.92	48.25	x	x	x	53.92	
5	Dalila Rugama	Nicaragua	45.69	49.26	47.36	51.77	47.86	52.83	52.83	
6	Zuleima Araméndiz	Colombia	49.92	x	x	x	x	51.75	51.75	
7	Ana Gutiérrez	Mexico	46.53	48.11	47.48	49.16	47.81	51.47	51.47	
8	Erma-Gene Evans	Saint Lucia	x	46.27	48.86	x	50.78	x	50.78	

=== Heptathlon ===
July 4–5

The highest mark recorded in each event is highlighted in yellow

Rank	Athlete	Nationality	100m H	HJ	SP	200m	LJ	JT	800m	Points	Notes
1st place, gold medalist(s)	Yarianny Argüelles	Cuba	14.13	1.87	11.43	23.96	6.13	40.77	2:33.06	5862	
2nd place, silver medalist(s)	Yasmiany Pedroso	Cuba	14.41	1.75	14.29	25.37	6.05	45.05	2:29.38	5833	
3rd place, bronze medalist(s)	Thaimara Rivas	Venezuela	14.51	1.57	12.21	25.68	5.72	41.85	2:27.37	5302	
4	Nazlhy Perea	Colombia	14.94	1.72	11.59	26.00	5.57	39.52	2:35.54	5163	
5	Solángel Rubio	Mexico	14.71	1.69	9.15	26.37	5.41	31.06	2:22.11	4927	
6	Andrea Jackson	Bermuda	15.32	1.57	11.61	26.62	NM	27.08	DNF	3301	
