= Track and field at the 2011 Military World Games – Women's 4 × 400 metres relay =

The women's 4 × 400 metres relay event at the 2011 Military World Games was held on 21 July at the Estádio Olímpico João Havelange.

== Records ==
Prior to this competition, the existing world and CISM record were as follows:

World Record	Soviet Union (Tatyana Ledovskaya, Olga Nazarova, Mariya Pinigina, Olga Bryzgina)	3:15.17	Seoul, South Korea	1 October 1988
CISM World Record				

== Schedule ==
Date	Time	Round
21 July 2011	19:05	Final

== Medalists ==
Gold	Silver	Bronze
Brazil; Vanda Gomes; Christiane dos Santos; Geisa Coutinho; Jailma de Lima	Dominican Republic; Raysa Sánchez; Margarita Manzueta; Marleny Mejía; Yolanda Osana	Sri Lanka; Menaka Wickramasinghe; Champika Dilrukshi; Sva Kusumawathi; Rmcs Rasnayake

== Results ==
=== Final ===
Rank	Lane	Nation	Name	Time	Notes
1st place, gold medalist(s)	7	Brazil	Vanda Gomes, Christiane dos Santos, Geisa Coutinho, Jailma de Lima	3:32.42	CR
2nd place, silver medalist(s)	4	Dominican Republic	Raysa Sánchez, Margarita Manzueta, Marleny Mejía, Yolanda Osana	3:38.75	
3rd place, bronze medalist(s)	3	Sri Lanka	Menaka Wickramasinghe, Champika Dilrukshi, Sva Kusumawathi, Rmcs Rasnayake	3:44.32	
4	8	Venezuela	Prisciliana Chourio, Nancy Garces, Letzabet Hidalgo, Wilmary Álvarez	3:46.30	
	6	Kazakhstan		DNS	
	5	Kenya		DNS	
