= Ryan Penn =

Bahamian sprinter (born 1988)

Personal information
- Born: April 6, 1988 (age 38) Freeport, Bahamas
Medal record
Athletics
Representing Bahamas
CARIFTA Games Junior (U20)
Bronze medal – third place	2005 Bacolet, Tobago	4x100 m relay

Ryan Penn (born April 6, 1988) is a Bahamian sprinter from Freeport, Bahamas who competed in the 100m and 200. He attended Grand Bahama Catholic High School in Freeport, Bahamas, before going on to compete for Southwestern Christian College and Louisiana State University.

He won a bronze medal on the 4 × 100 m relay at the 2005 CARIFTA Games in Tobago. He Also ran the 100m at the 2006 CARIFTA Games where he placed 8th in the 100m after suffering muscle cramps. He then placed 6th in the 100m at the 2006 Central American and Caribbean Junior Championships. Penn also competed at the 2005 World Youth Championships in Athletics and the 2005 Pan American Junior Athletics Championships.

In 2012 Penn competed in the IAAF World Challenge Grande Prêmio Brasil Caixa de Atletismo in Rio de Janeiro, Brazil. He ran the anchor leg of the 4 × 100 m relay in a time of 39.36.

== Personal bests ==
Event	Time	Venue	Date
100 m	10.37 (+1.9)	Abilene, Texas	May 9, 2008
200 m	20.78 (+1.6)	Abilene, Texas	May 9, 2008
400m	48.04	Nassau, Bahamas	June 24, 2016
