= Omar Bryan =

Caymanian cricketer (born 1984)

Personal information
- Born: 7 December 1984 (age 41)

International information
- National side: Cayman Islands
- Source: Cricinfo, 19 July 2015

Omar Bryan (born 7 December 1984) is a Caymanian cricketer. He played in the 2014 ICC World Cricket League Division Five tournament.
