= Cache Armbrister =

Bahamian sprinter of Jamaican descent

Medal record

Women's athletics

Representing Bahamas

CAC Championships
Bronze medal – third place	2011 Mayagüez	4×100 m relay
Bronze medal – third place	2013 Morelia	4×100 m relay

CARIFTA Games Junior (U20)
Gold medal – first place	2008 Basseterre	4x100 m relay
Silver medal – second place	2006 Les Abymes	4x100 m relay
Bronze medal – third place	2006 Les Abymes	200 m

CARIFTA Games (Youth)
Silver medal – second place	2004 Hamilton	4×400 m relay

Caché Armbrister (born 26 September 1989) is a Bahamian sprinter of Jamaican descent who specializes in the 100 metres, 200 metres and 400 metres She grew up in Nassau, where she attended St. Augustine's College. She later competed for Auburn University along with Nivea Smith and Sheniqua Ferguson who were all coached by Henry Rolle. During the 2013 season she moved to Jamaica to be coached by Usain Bolt and Yohan Blake's coach Glen Mills.

Ambrister now does athletic training for all ages.

== Personal bests ==
Event	Time	Venue	Date
100 m	11.35 (+1.2 w)	Morelia, Mexico	July 5, 2013
200 m	23.13 (+1.9 w)	Fayetteville, Arkansas	May 31, 2008
60m	7.53 (indoor)	Fayetteville, Arkansas	February 13, 2009
200m	23.77 (indoor)	Fayetteville, Arkansas	February 27, 2010
400m	53.45	Freeport, Bahamas	June 25, 2011

== See also ==
- List of Auburn University people
