= Jamaal Butler =

Bahamian sprinter

Personal information
- Born: July 31, 1988 (age 38)
Medal record
Athletics
Representing Bahamas
NACAC U-23 Championships
Silver medal – second place	2010 Miramar	4 × 400 meters
CAC Junior Championships (U20)
Bronze medal – third place	2006 Port of Spain	4 × 400 m relay
CARIFTA Games Junior (U20)
Bronze medal – third place	2005 Bacolet, Tobago	4 × 100 m relay
Bronze medal – third place	2005 Bacolet, Tobago	4 × 400 m relay

Jamaal Butler (born July 31, 1988) is a male sprinter from Nassau, Bahamas, who mainly competes in the 400m. He attended St. Augustine's College in Nassau, Bahamas, before going on to compete for South Plains College and Texas Tech University. Butler ran the third leg of the 4 × 400 m Relay at the NACAC U23 Championships in Athletics that won silver, as well as the third leg for the same event at the 2006 World Junior Championships in Athletics in Beijing, China.

He won a bronze medal on the 4 × 100 m relay and 4 × 400 m at the 2005 CARIFTA Games in Tobago.

== Personal bests ==
Event	Time (seconds)	Venue	Date
200m	21.81 (+4.2)	Abilene, Texas	24 MAR 2007
400m	47.25	Nassau, Bahamas	26 JUN 2010
400m Indoor	48.63	New York City, New York	24 JAN 2009
