= 2005 CARIFTA Games =

XXXIV CARIFTA Games
- Dates: March 26–28
- Host city: Bacolet, Trinidad and Tobago
- Venue: Dwight Yorke Stadium
- Level: Junior and Youth
- Events: 66 (35 junior (incl. 5 open), 31 youth)
- Participation: about 427 (215 junior, 212 youth) athletes from about 25 nations
- Records set: 4 games 8 national (senior)

The 34th CARIFTA Games was held in the Dwight Yorke Stadium in Bacolet, Tobago on March 26–28, 2005. The event was relocated from the National Stadium, St. George's, Grenada, because of the aftermath of Hurricane Ivan destroying 90 percent of the island's houses. An appraisal of the results has been given.

== Participation (unofficial) ==
Detailed result lists can be found on the CACAC, the CFPI and the "World Junior Athletics History" website. An unofficial count yields the number of about 427 athletes (215 junior (under-20) and 212 youth (under-17)) from about 25 countries: Anguilla (3), Antigua and Barbuda (10), Aruba (2), Bahamas (51), Barbados (37), Bermuda (12), British Virgin Islands (7), Cayman Islands (16), Dominica (5), French Guiana (1), Grenada (31), Guadeloupe (19), Guyana (8), Haiti (11), Jamaica (69), Martinique (31), Montserrat (2), Netherlands Antilles (6), Saint Kitts and Nevis (8), Saint Lucia (8), Saint Vincent and the Grenadines (3), Suriname (3), Trinidad and Tobago (59), Turks and Caicos Islands (18), US Virgin Islands (7).

== Records ==
A total of 4 new games records were set.

In the boys' U-20 category, Grégory Gamyr from Martinique achieved 18.11 metres in shot put.

In the boys' U-17 category, Theon O'Connor from Jamaica set the new 800m games record to 1:53.72. The 4x400 metres relay team from Trinidad and Tobago set the new games record to 3:15.09.

In the girls' U-17 category, the 4x100 metres relay team from Jamaica finished in 45.43 seconds.

Moreover, a total of 8 national (senior) records were set by the junior athletes. In the men's category, Junior Hines set the 3000 metres record for the Cayman Islands to 9:59.68.

In the women's category, individual records were set by Shara Proctor (long jump, 6.24m, wind: +0.9 m/s) for Anguilla, by Skyler Wallen (1500 metres, 4:44.79) for the Bahamas, by La Troya Darrell (triple jump, 12.29m, wind: -0.9 m/s) for Bermuda, by Opal Bodden (triple jump, 10.70m, wind: +0.8 m/s) for the Cayman Islands, and by Sanny Eugene (800 metres, 2:12.75) for the U.S. Virgin Islands. Moreover, the 4x100 metres relay teams of Grenada (45.41s) and the Turks and Caicos Islands (51.88s) established new national records.

== Austin Sealy Award ==
The Austin Sealy Trophy for the most outstanding athlete of the games was awarded to Theon O'Connor of Jamaica. He won 2 gold medals (800m, and 1500m) in the youth (U-17) category, setting a new 800m games record.

== Medal summary ==
Medal winners are published by category: Boys under 20 (Junior), Girls under 20 (Junior), Boys under 17 (Youth), and Girls under 17 (Youth). Complete results can be found on the CACAC, the CFPI and the "World Junior Athletics History" website.

=== Boys under 20 (Junior) ===
Event	Gold		Silver		Bronze	
100 metres (1.7 m/s)	Daniel Bailey (ATG)	10.36	Marcus Duncan (TRI)	10.53	Andon Mitchell (GRN)	10.54
200 metres (-0.9 m/s)	Daniel Bailey (ATG)	21.36	Mekel Downer (JAM)	21.49	Marcus Duncan (TRI)	21.64
400 metres	Renny Quow (TRI)	46.61	Jamil James (TRI)	46.81	Leford Green (JAM)	47.52
800 metres	Ramon Miller (BAH)	1:54.53	Codero Charles (BAH)	1:54.86	Kayon Smith (JAM)	1:55.08
1500 metres	Andre Drummond (JAM)	3:59.33	Lorry Lucea (MTQ)	4:00.25	Kayon Smith (JAM)	4:02.12
5000 metres^{o}	Andre Drummond (JAM)	16:08.27	Shawn Adams (LCA)	16:28.36	Junior Ashton (VIN)	16:38.52
110 metres hurdles (-0.7 m/s)	Markino Buckley (JAM)	14.34	Ryan Brathwaite (BAR)	14.64	Stevy Telliam (MTQ)	14.74
400 metres hurdles	Romel Lewis (JAM)	52.79	Tywayne Buchanan (JAM)	53.36	Terry Marshall (BAR)	53.69
High jump	Jamaal Wilson (BAH)	2.08	Darvin Edwards (LCA); Tarik Edwards (JAM)	2.05		
Pole vault^{o}	Jamaal Strachan (BAH)	3.50	Andrew Brown (BAH)	3.50	Kriston Caraballo (TRI)	3.10
Long jump	Jermaine Alphous Jackson (JAM)	7.50 (0.8 m/s)	Tarik Edwards (JAM)	7.19 (0.3 m/s)	Carl Morgan (CAY)	6.78 (0.6 m/s)
Triple jump	Alain Bailey (JAM)	14.60 (1.9 m/s)	Barry Batson (BAR)	14.54 (1.9 m/s)	Dellon Williams (TRI)	14.52 (1.1 m/s)
Shot put	Grégory Gamyr (MTQ)	18.11 CR	David Villeneuve (MTQ)	17.35	Camoi Hood (JAM)	17.16
Discus throw	Steve Hammond (JAM)	51.32	Adonson Shallow (VIN)	49.69	Camoi Hood (JAM)	46.81
Javelin throw	Carlos Morgan (CAY)	58.75	Adonson Shallow (VIN)	58.34	Ramon Farrington (BAH)	58.01
Heptathlon^{o}	Joel Phillip (GRN)	4803	Akido Noel (GRN)	4758	Peter Carter (TRI)	3884
4 x 100 metres relay	Trinidad and Tobago; Marcus Duncan; Keston Bledman; Rocky Caruth; Jamil James	41.05	Martinique; Yannick Lienafa; Cédric Laurier; Dimitri Bascou; Jocelyn Emmanuel	41.21	Bahamas; Lavardo Smith; Larry Pinder; Jamaal Butler; Ryan Penn	41.50
4 x 400 metres relay	Jamaica; Michael Gardener; Leford Green; Romel Lewis; Tywayne Buchanan	3:09.94	Trinidad and Tobago; Jamil James; Damon Douglas; Ade Alleyne-Forte; Renny Quow	3:10.32	Bahamas; Ramon Miller; Larry Pinder; Jamaal Butler; Jamal Moss	3:14.20

^{o}: Open event for both junior and youth athletes.

=== Girls under 20 (Junior) ===
Event	Gold		Silver		Bronze	
100 metres (0.9 m/s)	Kelly Ann Baptiste (TRI)	11.39	Sherry Fletcher (GRN)	11.72	Shelly-Ann Fraser (JAM)	11.73
200 metres (0.1 m/s)	Kelly Ann Baptiste (TRI)	23.25	Anneisha McLaughlin (JAM)	23.28	Sherry Fletcher (GRN)	24.03
400 metres	Sonita Sutherland (JAM)	54.22	Anastasia Le-Roy (JAM)	55.19	Marie-Angélique Lacordelle (GUF)	55.20
800 metres	Sanny Eugene (ISV)	2:12.75 NR	Bobby-Gaye Wilkins (JAM)	2:12.98	Kertisha John (TRI)	2:13.03
1500 metres	Jodian Richards (JAM)	4:38.56	Pilar McShine (TRI)	4:41.11	Petrona Layne (JAM)	4:45.52
3000 metres^{o}	Stacey Bell (JAM)	9:59.37	Pilar McShine (TRI)	10:18.19	Alika Morgan (GUY)	10:20.24
100 metres hurdles (-0.5 m/s)	Latoya Greaves (JAM)	13.82	Kimberly Laing (JAM)	14.35	Alexandria Oembler (BAH)	14.45
400 metres hurdles	Sherene Pinnock (JAM)	57.18	Nickiesha Wilson (JAM)	57.38	Michelle Cumberbatch (BAH)	60.49
High jump	Rhonda Watkins (TRI)	1.82	La Troya Darrell (BER)	1.74	Shantel Thompson (JAM)	1.71
Long jump	Rhonda Watkins (TRI)	6.29 (0.4 m/s)	Shara Proctor (AIA)	6.24 NR (0.4 m/s)	Lyvie-Paola Laurent (GLP)	5.78 (1.0 m/s)
Triple jump	Nathalie Marie-Nély (MTQ)	12.96 (0.4 m/s)	La Troya Darrell (BER)	12.29 NR (-0.9 m/s)	Tina Ferguson (BAH)	11.98 (1.8 m/s)
Shot put	Annie Alexander (TRI)	14.62	Keisha Walkes (BAR)	13.97	Tressa-Ann Charles (LCA)	13.85
Discus throw	Keisha Walkes (BAR)	45.03	Annie Alexander (TRI)	39.24	Marie-Christine Vulcain (MTQ)	38.92
Javelin throw	Kyann Maynard (BAR)	45.22	Laurence Germany (MTQ)	45.07	Tracey Morrison (BAH)	44.08
Pentathlon^{o}	Natoya Baird (TRI)	3286	Sasha Joyce (BAH)	3126	Taronya Wildgoose (BAH)	2653
4 x 100 metres relay	Jamaica Shelly-Ann Fraser	44.53	Trinidad and Tobago Kelly Ann Baptiste	44.76	Grenada; Ann Marie Francis; Raquel Mitchell; Alison George; Sherry Fletcher	45.41 NR
4 x 400 metres relay	Jamaica; Anastasia Le-Roy; Sherene Pinnock; Bobby-Gaye Wilkins; Sonita Sutherland	3:36.91	Trinidad and Tobago; Crystal Skeete; Janelle Clarke; Shelly McLean; Latosha Roach	3:44.08	Bahamas	3:45.93

^{o}: Open event for both junior and youth athletes.

=== Boys under 17 (Youth) ===
Event	Gold		Silver		Bronze	
100 metres (1.5 m/s)	Yohan Blake (JAM)	11.01	Xavier Roach (BAR)	11.06	Withley Williams (SKN)	11.06
200 metres (-1.0 m/s)	Yohan Blake (JAM)	22.19	Kervin Morgan (TRI)	22.30	Antoneil Thomas (JAM)	22.46
400 metres	Kervin Morgan (TRI)	48.15	Juan Lewis (BAH)	49.40	Karlton Rolle (BAH)	49.51
800 metres	Theon O'Connor (JAM)	1:53.72 CR	Andre Thomas (JAM)	1:56.63	Curtis Kock (AHO)	1:56.72
1500 metres	Theon O'Connor (JAM)	4:05.59	Gavyn Nero (TRI)	4:07.99	Andre Thomas (JAM)	4:10.41
3000 metres	Gavyn Nero (TRI)	9:15.92	Chad Isaac (GRN)	9:33.55	Lowis Green (GLP)	9:38.98
100 metres hurdles (1.0 m/s)	Keiron Stewart (JAM)	13.41	Livan Midonet (MTQ); Montano Palacious (BAH)	13.47		
400 metres hurdles	Dwight Robinson (JAM)	53.67	Nathan Arnett (BAH)	53.76	Ansil Nicholson (TRI)	54.27
High jump	Raymond Higgs (BAH)	1.85	Kijaun Wilkinson (BER)	1.85	Marvin Dall (AHO)	1.80
Long jump	Gerard Brown (BAH)	6.64 (0.0 m/s)	Darrell Simpson (JAM)	6.59 (0.4 m/s)	Willy Régent (GLP)	6.49 (0.7 m/s)
Triple jump	Gerard Brown (BAH)	14.66 w (2.7 m/s)	Jérémie Varsovie (MTQ)	13.92 w (2.2 m/s)	Kyron Blaise (TRI)	13.71 w (2.6 m/s)
Shot put	Shane Evans (CAY)	14.59	Sheldon Roach (BAR)	14.26	Kofie Worrell (BAR)	14.01
Discus throw	Sheldon Roach (BAR)	48.45	Richard Ibeh (CAY)	46.36	Emmanuel Stewart (TRI)	46.07
Javelin throw	Ramon Burgess (BAR)	51.01	Davis Hypolite (DMA)	48.90	Daniel Cash (BAH)	48.13
4 x 100 metres relay	Jamaica	42.06	Trinidad and Tobago	42.27	Bahamas; Montano Palacious; Oswald Ingraham; Remaal Thompson; Warren Fraser	43.31
4 x 400 metres relay	Trinidad and Tobago; Zwede Hewitt; Jevon Toppin; Jervon Mattews; Kervin Morgan	3:15.09 CR	Jamaica	3:15.39	Bahamas ? Karlton Rolle; Nathan Arnett; Juan Lewis	3:18.71

=== Girls under 17 (Youth) ===
Event	Gold		Silver		Bronze	
100 metres (1.5 m/s)	Anika Jno-Baptiste (ATG)	11.76	Jurnelle Francis (TRI)	11.88	Marsha Louis (TRI)	11.90
200 metres (-1.0 m/s)	LaToya King (JAM)	23.68	Britney St. Louis (TRI)	23.98	Anika Jno-Baptiste (ATG)	24.07
400 metres	Britney St. Louis (TRI)	54.79	Latoya McDermott (JAM)	55.00	Deandra Knowles (BAH)	56.14
800 metres	Natoya Goule (JAM)	2:14.16	Teneisha Davis (JAM)	2:14.44	Latoya Griffith (BAR)	2:15.13
1500 metres	Natoya Goule (JAM)	4:39.05	Teneisha Davis (JAM)	4:44.45	Skyler Wallen (BAH)	4:44.79 NR
100 metres hurdles (-0.8 m/s)	Natasha Ruddock (JAM)	13.72	Shermaine Williams (JAM)	13.93	Jessica Alcan (MTQ)	14.18
300 metres hurdles	Christina Mitchell (JAM)	43.85	Natalya Beneby (BAH)	44.05	Shana-Gaye Tracey (JAM)	44.42
High jump	Jamiyla Jordan (BAR)	1.65	Tamika Grant (JAM)	1.60	Jillian Stephen (GRN)	1.60
Long jump	Arantxa King (BER)	5.98 (0.3 m/s)	Francine Simpson (JAM)	5.49 (0.2 m/s)	Chantel Malone (IVB)	5.25 (-0.2 m/s)
Triple jump	Keshia Willix (MTQ)	12.29 (1.9 m/s)	Myriam Lixfe (MTQ)	12.25 w (2.1 m/s)	Chantel Malone (IVB)	11.09 (2.0 m/s)
Shot put	Myriam Lixfe (MTQ)	12.45	Gianni Robard (MTQ)	12.10	Gabrielle Nixon (BAH)	11.95
Discus throw	Geneva Greaves (JAM)	35.42	Gabrielle Nixon (BAH)	32.15	Sidgie Vin (GLP)	31.95
Javelin throw	Shamaria Davis (BAR)	38.19	Deandra Dottin (BAR)	37.21	Lavonne Charles (TRI)	35.73
4 x 100 metres relay	Jamaica; Natasha Ruddock; Latoya King; Francine Simpson; Danique Jeffrey	45.43	Trinidad and Tobago	46.59	Bahamas	46.96
4 x 400 metres relay	Trinidad and Tobago; Sade St. Louis; Kelly-Ann Romeo; Cadajah Spencer; Britney St. Louis	3:44.05	Jamaica	3:46.42	Bahamas	3:49.39

== Medal table (unofficial) ==
The medal count has been published. There is a mismatch between the unofficial medal count and the published medal count for the Bahamas and Trinidad and Tobago. This can be explained by the fact that there were only three competitors in the boys U20 pole vault event, therefore not having been considered in the published medal count.

* Host nation (Trinidad and Tobago)

Rank	Nation	Gold	Silver	Bronze	Total
1	Jamaica (JAM)	29	19	11	59
2	Trinidad and Tobago (TTO)*	13	14	10	37
3	Bahamas (BAH)	6	8	18	32
4	Barbados (BAR)	6	6	3	15
5	Martinique (MTQ)	4	8	3	15
6	Antigua and Barbuda (ATG)	3	0	1	4
7	Cayman Islands (CAY)	2	1	1	4
8	Grenada (GRN)	1	3	4	8
9	Bermuda (BER)	1	3	0	4
10	U.S. Virgin Islands (VIR)	1	0	0	1
11	Saint Lucia (LCA)	0	2	1	3
11	Saint Vincent and the Grenadines (VIN)	0	2	1	3
13	Commonwealth Games Federation (CGF)	0	1	0	1
13	Dominica (DMA)	0	1	0	1
15	Guadeloupe (GLP)	0	0	4	4
16	British Virgin Islands (IVB)	0	0	2	2
16	Netherlands Antilles (AHO)	0	0	2	2
18	French Guiana (GUF)	0	0	1	1
18	Guyana (GUY)	0	0	1	1
18	Saint Kitts and Nevis (SKN)	0	0	1	1
Totals (20 entries)		66	68	64	198
