= Samantha John =

American entrepreneur (born 1985/86)

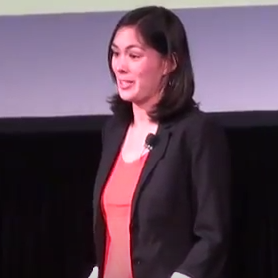
- Samantha John (2014)
- Education: Columbia University
- Occupation: Entrepreneur
- Known for: Founder of Hopscotch

Samantha John (born 1985 or 1986 (age 40)) is an American entrepreneur, known for being the co-founder of Hopscotch, a learn-to-code application.

== Education and career ==
John studied applied mathematics, English, and comparative literature at Columbia University. John became interested in computers and programming in her senior year of college when she began working on a website for a student club. Before developing Hopscotch, she had worked as an engineer and a developer at Pivotal Labs. She had been one of the only women developers at the company. After partnering with Hopscotch co-founder and fellow Columbia alumna Jocelyn Leavitt, John created her first app named "Daisy the Dinosaur" in 2012. John eventually left her consultancy job to pursue the development of Hopscotch full-time. In 2013, Business Insider listed John as one of the "30 Most Important Women Under 30 in Tech", "Silicon Alley 100", and "28 Extraordinary Women in New York Tech" for cofounding Hopscotch Technologies. Glamour magazine named John and co-founder Leavitt in their list of "35 Women Under 35 Who are Changing the Tech Industry" in 2014. In 2015, she was listed as one of BBC's 100 Women.

== Hopscotch ==
John created Hopscotch at the age of 26 with educator Jocelyn Leavitt, who noticed a lack of women and people of color in engineering. Hopscotch is the first programming language designed for a touch screen device. John and Leavitt aimed to create a programming language that was simple enough for children to use, while still allowing children to learn and be creative. The app involves a visual programming language, rather than employing lines of code. Hopscotch, which is aimed at children ages eight to 12, was downloaded 20,000 times in its first week. John and Leavitt first launched the app for iPad in 2013, and have since developed the app for iPhone. Within one year, users created over 2.5 million projects. Most children use the app to build games and create animated artwork while learning programming basics. According to the founders, nearly half of Hopscotch's users are girls.

Hopscotch was partially inspired by HyperCard, an early software application and development kit which also inspired the creator of "wiki" software, as well as Scratch, an early visual programming environment. In addition, John notes inspiration from her mentor, Alan Kay. John revealed in Shark Tank, that Hopscotch had 200k active users every month for the first time in 2020. Hopscotch has received the Best Education Tech App Awards by Parent Magazine.
