= Sherry Fletcher =

Grenadian track and field athlete

Personal information
- Born: 17 January 1986 (age 40)

Sport
- Sport: Track and field
- Club: LSU Tigers
Medal record
Representing Grenada
Pan American Games
Bronze medal – third place	2007 Rio de Janeiro	200 m
CARIFTA Games Junior (U20)
Silver medal – second place	2005 Bacolet, Tobago	100 m
Bronze medal – third place	2005 Bacolet, Tobago	200 m
Bronze medal – third place	2005 Bacolet, Tobago	4x100 m relay
CARIFTA Games Youth (U17)
Silver medal – second place	2002 Nassau	4x400 m relay

Sherry Ingrid Veronica Fletcher (born 17 January 1986) is a female track and field sprinter from Grenada, who specializes in the 200 metres. Her personal best time is 22.67 seconds, achieved in June 2007 in Sacramento. This is the current Grenadian record. Fletcher also holds the Grenadian 100 metres record with 11.18 seconds, achieved during the heats at the 2007 Pan American Games.

In 2007, she won the bronze medal in this event at the Pan American Games, where she also finished fifth in the 100 metres. She then participated at the World Championships in Osaka where she reached the quarter-finals in the 100 and Semi Finals in the 200 metre sprint. Fletcher represented Grenada at the 2008 Summer Olympics in Beijing competing at the 100 metres sprint. In her first round heat she placed fifth in a time of 11.65 which was not enough to advance to the second round. Fletcher ran track collegiately at Louisiana State University and was the 2007 NCAA 100m champion winning with a time of 11.20 seconds.

She is the older sister of Grenadian cricketer Andre Fletcher.

== Achievements ==
Year	Competition	Venue	Position	Event	Notes
Representing Grenada
2001	CARIFTA Games (U-17)	Bridgetown, Barbados	7th	100 m	12.46s (0.0 m/s)
2001	CARIFTA Games (U-17)	Bridgetown, Barbados	3rd (h)	200 m	25.61s (-1.9 m/s)
2002	CARIFTA Games (U-17)	Nassau, Bahamas	5th	100 m	12.16s (0.6 m/s)
2002	CARIFTA Games (U-17)	Nassau, Bahamas	2nd	4 × 400 m relay	3:46.23
2003	CARIFTA Games (U-20)	Port of Spain, Trinidad and Tobago	7th	100 m	11.97s w (3.8 m/s)
2003	CARIFTA Games (U-20)	Port of Spain, Trinidad and Tobago	4th (h)	200 m	24.82s (1.9 m/s)
2003	CARIFTA Games (U-20)	Port of Spain, Trinidad and Tobago	4th	4 × 100 m relay	47.02s
2003	CARIFTA Games (U-20)	Port of Spain, Trinidad and Tobago	4th	4 × 400 m relay	3:59.68
2004	CARIFTA Games (U-20)	Hamilton, Bermuda	5th	100 m	12.00s (-1.7 m/s)
2004	CARIFTA Games (U-20)	Hamilton, Bermuda	4th	200 m	23.91s (1.1 m/s)
2004	World Junior Championships	Grosseto, Italy	20th (sf)	200m	24.61 (wind: +0.5 m/s)
2005	CARIFTA Games (U-20)	Bacolet, Trinidad and Tobago	2nd	100 m	11.72s (0.9 m/s)
2005	CARIFTA Games (U-20)	Bacolet, Trinidad and Tobago	3rd	200 m	24.03s (0.1 m/s)
2005	CARIFTA Games (U-20)	Bacolet, Trinidad and Tobago	3rd	4 × 100 m relay	45.41s NR
2007	Pan American Games	Rio de Janeiro, Brazil	4th	100m	11.36
2007	Pan American Games	Rio de Janeiro, Brazil	2nd	200m	22.96
2007	World Championships in Athletics	Osaka, Japan	5th (qf)	100m	11.32
2007	World Championships in Athletics	Osaka, Japan	10th (sf)	200m	22.96
