= Karlton Rolle =

Bahamian sprinter

Personal information
- Born: August 14, 1990 (age 35)
Medal record
Athletics
Representing Bahamas
CAC Championships
Bronze medal – third place	2009 Havana	4x100 m relay
CARIFTA Games Junior (U20)
Bronze medal – third place	2008 Basseterre	4x400 m relay
CARIFTA Games Junior (U17)
Gold medal – first place	2006 Les Abymes	200m
Silver medal – second place	2006 Les Abymes	4x100 m relay
Bronze medal – third place	2006 Les Abymes	4x400 m relay
Bronze medal – third place	2005 Bacolet, Tobago	400
Bronze medal – third place	2005 Bacolet, Tobago	4x400 m relay
Bronze medal – third place	2006 Les Abymes	100m

Karlton Rolle (born August 14, 1990) is a Bahamian sprinter from Nassau, Bahamas who competed in the 100m 200m and 400m. He attended Nassau Christian Academy high school in Nassau, Bahamas, before going on to compete for UCLA.

He won a bronze medal in the 400m open even and the 4x400 relay at the 2005 CARIFTA Games in Tobago. He Also ran the 100m at the 2006 CARIFTA Games where he placed 3rd. He then went on to win the 200m gold at the same games.

== Personal bests ==
Event	Time	Venue	Date
100 m	10.56 (+0.9)	Los Angeles, California	01 MAY 2010
200 m	20.96 (-0.3)	Havana, Cuba	05 JUL 2009
