= Allison George =

Grenadian sprinter

Allison George Echard
Personal information
- Full name: Allison Magdalene George Echard
- Nationality: Grenada
- Born: 3 January 1988 (age 38) Saint Andrew Parish, Grenada
- Height: 1.57 m (5 ft 2 in)
- Weight: 116 kg (256 lb)

Sport
- Sport: Athletics
- Event: Sprint
- Team: Texas A&M Aggies (USA)

Achievements and titles
- Personal best(s): 100 m: 11.34 s (2009); 200 m: 22.72 s (2008)

Allison Magdalene George (born January 3, 1988) is a Grenadian sprinter, who specialized in the 200 metres. She set a personal best time of 22.72 seconds, by finishing fourth at the 2008 Big 12 Outdoor Track and Field Championships in Boulder, Colorado.

George represented Grenada at the 2008 Summer Olympics in Beijing, where she competed for the women's 200 metres. She ran in the sixth and final heat against seven other athletes, including Jamaica's Sherone Simpson and LaVerne Jones-Ferrette of the Virgin Islands, both of whom were heavy favorites in this event. She finished the race in sixth place by two hundredths of a second (0.02) behind Brazil's Evelyn dos Santos, with a time of 23.45 seconds. Although she was ranked below four qualifying places, George advanced into the next round of the competition, based on her performance in the heats. George, however, fell short in her bid for the semi-finals, as she placed eighth in the fourth heat of the quarterfinal round, with a time of 23.77 seconds.

George is also a member of the track and field team for the Texas A&M Aggies, and a graduate of leadership, minor in sociology and English, at the Texas A&M University in College Station, Texas.
