= José Esparza =

Venezuelan-American virologist (born 1945)

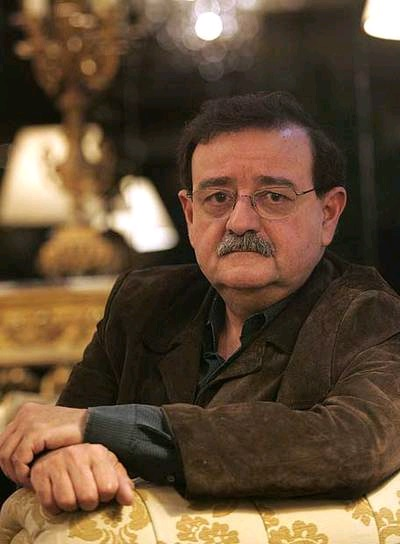
José Esparza

José Esparza is a Venezuelan American virologist who lives in the US. He is known for his efforts to promote the international development and testing of vaccines against HIV/AIDS. From 1968 to 1985, he pursued an academic career at the Venezuelan Institute for Scientific Research (IVIC), attaining positions as full professor of virology and chairman of its Department of Microbiology and Cell Biology. From 1986 to 2014 he worked continuously as a viral vaccine expert and senior public health adviser for international health policy agencies such as the World Health Organization, the Joint United Nations Programme on HIV/AIDS, and the Bill & Melinda Gates Foundation. José G. Esparza is currently an adjunct professor of medicine, at the Institute of Human Virology (University of Maryland School of Medicine). During 2016 he was the president of the Global Virus Network. In the context of historical studies on the early use of horsepox for smallpox vaccination, Esparza was appointed in 2018 as a Robert Koch Fellow at the Robert Koch Institute in Berlin, Germany. He is an active member of the Latin American Academy of Sciences, ACAL.

== Biography ==
Esparza was born in Maracaibo on December 19, 1945. He attended both primary and secondary school at the local Jesuit Colegio Gonzaga, where he graduated in 1962.

== Academic career ==
Esparza studied medicine at the Universidad del Zulia Medical School (Maracaibo), where he obtained an M.D. in 1968. During his undergraduate teenage years, Esparza teamed up with some of his teachers in viral research studies designed to characterize a large zoonotic outbreak of Venezuelan equine encephalitis affecting people and riding beasts in the nearby Guajira region and its surroundings. He entered IVIC (Caracas) to work at as a graduate student under the guidance of Gernot H. Bergold and then moved to Houston, TX, to pursue graduate studies under the mentorship of virologist Priscilla Shaffer and attend advanced virology courses given by Joseph L. Melnick. Esparza obtained his Ph.D. degree in virology and cell biology from Baylor College of Medicine in 1974. He then returned to Venezuela to work at IVIC where he became chairman and full professor of virology in 1985. As part of a sabbatical leave Esparza was invited by the Department of Microbiology & Immunology at Duke University (Durham, N.C.) to work with Wolfgang Joklik. At Durham, Esparza applied modern methods of molecular engineering to study reoviruses. He also applied such tools to the study of rotaviruses, a leading worldwide cause of infantile diarrhea which severely affects and causes many deaths in toddlers living in developing countries like Venezuela. By this stage Esparza had attained hands-on command of many aspects of viral research techniques (i.e., virus-isolation, culture, serotyping, structure, genetic engineering and vaccine development) as well as project-management expertise while heading studies of a variety of human viral pathologies including enchephalitis, herpes, and rotaviruses. In 1986 Esparza was then recruited as a medical officer by the Division of Communicable Diseases of the World Health Organization, a position which implied worldwide supervising responsibilities of research projects involving various vector-borne viral diseases such as yellow fever, dengue, encephalitis and hemorrhagic fever. In 1988 Esparza joined the recently created WHO Global Programme on AIDS and in 1996 he was required to head the Vaccine Development Unit sponsored jointly by WHO-UNAIDS, a task he undertook until 2004. He then joined the Bill and Melinda Gates Foundation(Seattle) from 2004 to 2014, first as senior adviser on HIV Vaccines, and from 2011 as senior adviser on global health and vaccines. He then moved to Washington(DC), occupying a position as adjunct professor of medicine at the Institute of Human Virology, University of Maryland School of Medicine, where he continues writing about conceptual aspects of HIV-vaccine development and participating in the monitoring of some of the ongoing clinical trials for HIV-vaccine.

== Research ==
- Herpes Virus Type 2 : genetic aspects. This was the subject of Esparza's Ph.D. dissertation (with honors) working under Priscilla Schaffer. Such work served as a basis for several publications focusing on mutations affecting the temperature sensitivity of the virus.
- Venezuelan equine encephalitis virus. Around the end of 1970s Esparza became involved in studies of various aspects of this zoonotic disease using both mosquito-cell cultures of the virus as well as an in-vivo experimental rat-model of the disease.
- Reovirus. This research -performed at Duke University- led to the cloning of the genes of the Dearning strain of reovirus serotype 3, and the subsequent sequencing and characterization of cloned S2 gene.
- Rotavirus. Esparza-Bracho researched on this area extensively, including aspects such as:
  - Electron microscopic studies on multiplication of human rotavirus.
  - Polypeptide composition and topography of bovine rotavirus.
  - Molecular cloning of a human rotavirus genome.
  - Antigenic variation of Latinamerican rotavirus.
  - Structural studies of the rotavirus inner capsid.
  - Gene sequence of some rotavirus proteins.

== HIV vaccine development ==
Consistent with his advisory role at international agencies involved in HIV-vaccine development, Esparza's efforts in this field have emphasized the following aspects:

- Characterization of HIV strains present in different countries to guide vaccine development.
- Strengthening vaccine-trial action in various developing countries including Brazil, Rwanda, Thailand and Uganda.
- Contributing to the development of ethical guidelines of conduct for HIV-vaccine trials.
- Leadership to ensure that future HIV vaccines are available to all populations in need, and not only to those living in the economically developed world.
- Spearheading the establishment of a Global HIV Vaccine Enterprise as an alliance of independent organizations around the world devoted to accelerating the development of preventive HIV vaccine and related activities.

== Honors and distinctions ==
- 2023: Centennial Medal from the Venezuelan National Academy of Medicine
- 2013: Distinguished Alumnus Award from Baylor College of Medicine
- 2013: Lifetime Achievement Award (Public Service), Institute of Human Virology, Univ. Maryland.
- 2013: Ivanovsky Medal of Virology, awarded by the Russian AIDS Society, Moscow, Russia.
- 2012: Congressional Medal of Merit, House of Representatives, US Congress, Washington.
- 2011: Plaque from Mahidol University, presented by HRH Princess Sirindhorn, Bangkok, Thailand.
- 2005: "Hope is a Vaccine" award, GAIA Foundation, Providence, RI.
- 1999: Doctor Honoris Causa, Universidad del Zulia, Maracaibo, Venezuela.
- 1998: Elected Member, Venezuelan Academy of Medicine, Caracas.
- 1982: Order "Andres Bello", Ministry of Education, Venezuela.
