= Juan Miguel Zeledón =

Nicaraguan sprinter

Juan Zeledon (born 30 December 1985 Somoto, Madriz) represented Nicaragua at the 2008 Summer Olympics in the men's 200 metres. He finished ninth in heat 5 with a time of 23.39 seconds. He failed to advance to the second round.
