= Carlyle Thompson =

Bahamian sprinter and hurdler

Personal information
- Born: October 30, 1988 (age 37)
Medal record
Athletics
Representing Bahamas
CARIFTA Games Junior (U20)
Silver medal – second place	2006 Les Abymes	400 m Hurdles
Silver medal – second place	2006 Les Abymes	4 × 400 m relay

Carlyle Thompson (born October 30, 1988) is a Bahamian sprinter from Nassau, Bahamas who competed in the 400 m Hurdles and 400 m. He attended St. Annes High School in Nassau, Bahamas, before going on to compete for Allen County Community College and Nova Southeastern University. He won two silver medals at the 2006 CARIFTA Games first in the open 400 m Hurdles then on the third leg of the 4 × 400 m Relay.

== Personal bests ==
Event	Time	Venue	Date
200 m	21.77 (+1.8)	Arkansas City, Kansas	08 MAY 2009
400 m	48.42	Miramar, Florida	13 MAR 2010
400 m Hurdles	50.36	Hutchinson, Kansas	23 MAY 2009
