= Raysa Sánchez =

Dominican Republic sprinter

Personal information
- Born: May 6, 1988 (age 37)
- Height: 1.78 m (5 ft 10 in)
- Weight: 61 kg (134 lb)

Sport
- Country: Dominican Republic
- Sport: Athletics
- Event: 400m

Raysa Sánchez (born 6 May 1988 in Santo Domingo, Dominican Republic) is a Dominican sprinter who specializes in the 400 metres. She represented the Dominican Republic at the 2012 Summer Olympics. Raysa resides in the city of San Germán, Puerto Rico where she runs for the Intermerican University of Puerto Rico. She holds the 400 m race record in Puerto Rico's university athletic league (LAI = Liga Atlética Interuniversitaria). She also holds the Dominican Republic record for the same race.
