= Athletics at the 2016 Summer Olympics =

Athletics at the Games of the XXXI Olympiad
- Venue: Pontal (race walk); Estádio Olímpico João Havelange (track & field); Sambódromo (marathon)
- Dates: 12–21 August 2016
- No. of events: 47

Athletics at the 2016 Summer Olympics were held during the last 10 days of the games, from 12 to 21 August 2016, at the Olympic Stadium. The sport of athletics at the 2016 Summer Olympics was made into three distinct sets of events: track and field events, road running events, and racewalking events.

== Competition schedule ==
Track and field events were held at João Havelange Olympic Stadium, while the race walks and marathon start and finish in Pontal Beach in the Recreio dos Bandeirantes neighbourhood and the Sambadrome Marquês de Sapucaí, respectively. Apart from the race walks and marathon, ten track and field events held finals in the morning sessions for the first time since 1988. This change was implemented upon the request of the Rio 2016 Organizing Committee (COJOP Rio 2016) and the Olympic Broadcasting Services to be supported by the International Olympic Committee, ensuring that at least one final was broadcast live for each of the world's 24 time zones.

In the tables below, M stands for morning and A for afternoon.

Legend
P	Preliminary round	Q	Qualification	H	Heats	½	Semi-finals	F	Final

Ref
Men's
Date	Aug 12		Aug 13			Aug 14			Aug 15		Aug 16			Aug 17		Aug 18		Aug 19		Aug 20		Aug 21	
Event	M	A	M		A	M	A		M	A	M	A		M	A	M	A	M	A	M	A	M	A
100 m			Q	H			½	F															
200 m											H				½		F						
400 m		H			½		F																
800 m	H				½					F													
1500 m											H						½				F		
5000 m														H							F		
10,000 m					F																		
110 m hurdles										H		½	F										
400 m hurdles									H			½				F							
3000 m steeplechase									H					F									
4 × 100 m relay																H			F				
4 × 400 m relay																			H		F		
Marathon																						F	
20 km walk	F																						
50 km walk																		F					
Long jump		Q			F																		
Triple jump									Q		F												
High jump							Q					F											
Pole vault					Q					F													
Shot put																Q	F						
Discus throw	Q		F																				
Javelin throw															Q						F		
Hammer throw														Q					F				
Decathlon														F									
Women's
Date	Aug 12		Aug 13			Aug 14		Aug 15		Aug 16		Aug 17			Aug 18		Aug 19		Aug 20		Aug 21		
Event	M	A	M	A		M	A	M	A	M	A	M	A		M	A	M	A	M	A	M	A	
100 m	Q	H		½	F																		
200 m									H		½		F										
400 m			H				½		F														
800 m												H				½				F			
1500 m		H					½				F												
5000 m										H								F					
10,000 m	F																						
100 m hurdles										H			½	F									
400 m hurdles								H			½					F							
3000 m steeplechase			H					F															
4 × 100 m relay															H			F					
4 × 400 m relay																		H		F			
Marathon						F																	
20 km walk																	F						
Long jump											Q		F										
Triple jump			Q				F																
High jump															Q					F			
Pole vault										Q								F					
Shot put	Q	F																					
Discus throw									Q	F													
Javelin throw											Q					F							
Hammer throw		Q						F															
Heptathlon	F																						

== Qualification ==
The Olympic qualification criteria were simplified by the International Association of Athletics Federations (IAAF) from a two-tiered "A" and "B" standard approach to a single qualification standard. Each National Olympic Committee was entitled to send up to three athletes per event that had reached that standard in the period from 2015 to 11 July 2016. Nations without a qualified athlete could enter one male and one female athlete who had not achieved the standard. Marathon runners had additional ways to qualify in that top 20 World Championship or top 10 IAAF Gold Label race finishers were treated as having achieved the standard.

The relay teams entered were the top eight finishers at the 2015 IAAF World Relays plus the next eight highest ranking teams on the seasonal lists (based on an aggregate of their best two times).

Nations with a strong tradition in athletics which had many qualified athletes available for events typically held selection trials to determine their teams (such as the 2016 United States Olympic Trials), or relied on panel decisions by their national governing bodies to determine which athletes could compete.

== Daily summaries ==
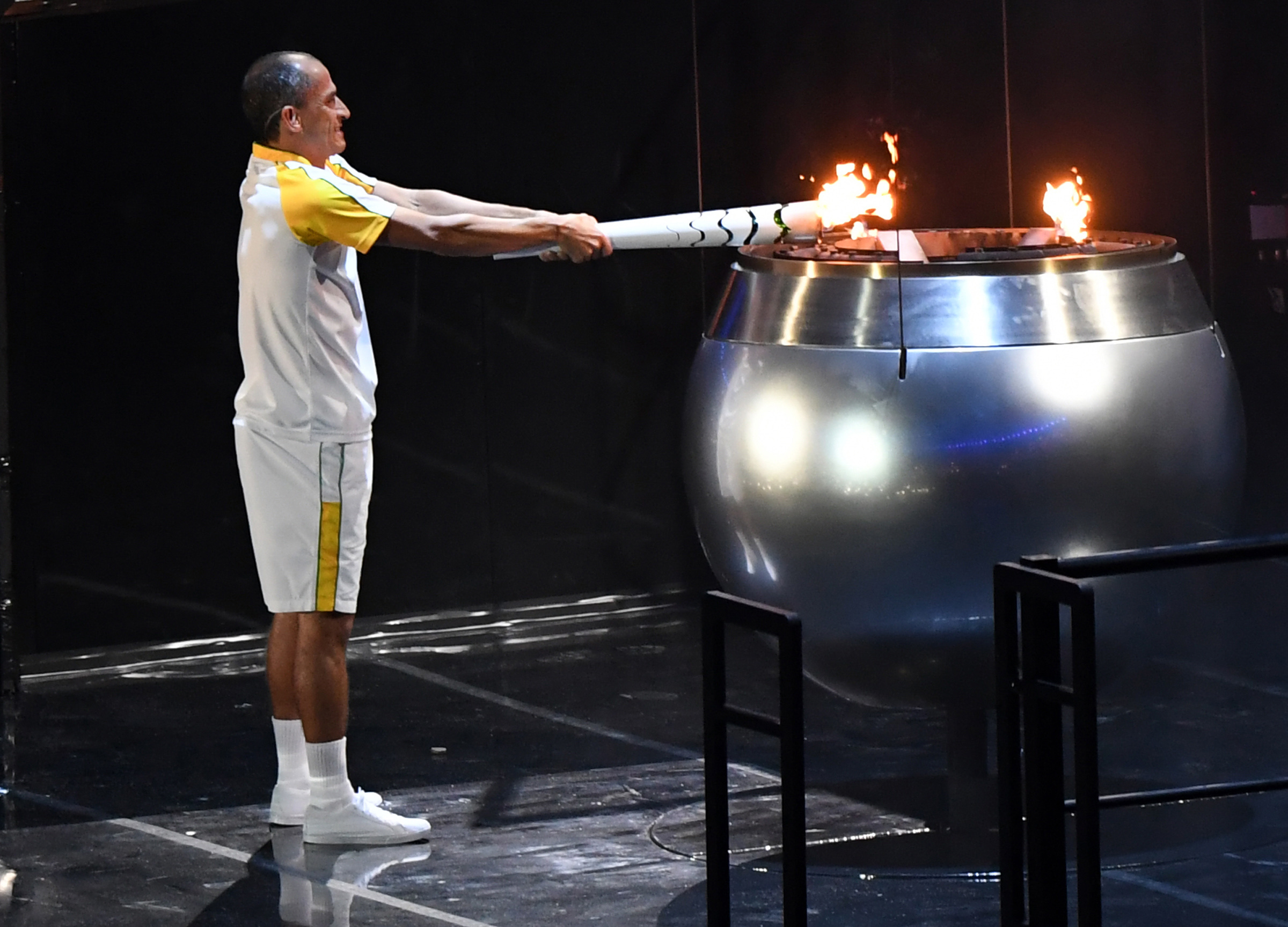
Marathon runner Vanderlei de Lima lighting the Olympic flame

At the opening ceremony two figures from the sport of athletics played a key role: Olympic medallist in the marathon, Vanderlei de Lima, lit the Olympic flame for his home nation, while Kenya's Kipchoge Keino became the first recipient of the Olympic Laurel for his efforts in promoting sport. Unlike most Summer Olympic Games, the athletics stadium in Rio was not the venue for the opening or closing ceremonies – that honour went to Brazil's foremost soccer venue, the Maracanã Stadium.

=== First three days ===
On the first day, the first gold medal was won by Almaz Ayana of Ethiopia, who broke a long-standing world record in the women's 10,000 metres by almost fifteen seconds. The race as a whole was historically fast, setting four of the five fastest times ever for the distance and seeing eight national records broken. China's Wang Zhen was the first male winner of the 2016 Olympic athletics, topping the 20 kilometres race walk podium. With her final throw of the event, Michelle Carter won the United States' first ever title in the women's shot put, preventing Valerie Adams from winning a third straight title. The first half of the heptathlon saw two athletes set a world heptathlon best: Belgium's Nafissatou Thiam and Great Britain's Katarina Johnson-Thompson both cleared 1.98 m (6 ft 5 3/4 in) for the high jump. (Their marks would have been sufficient for the individual high jump gold.)

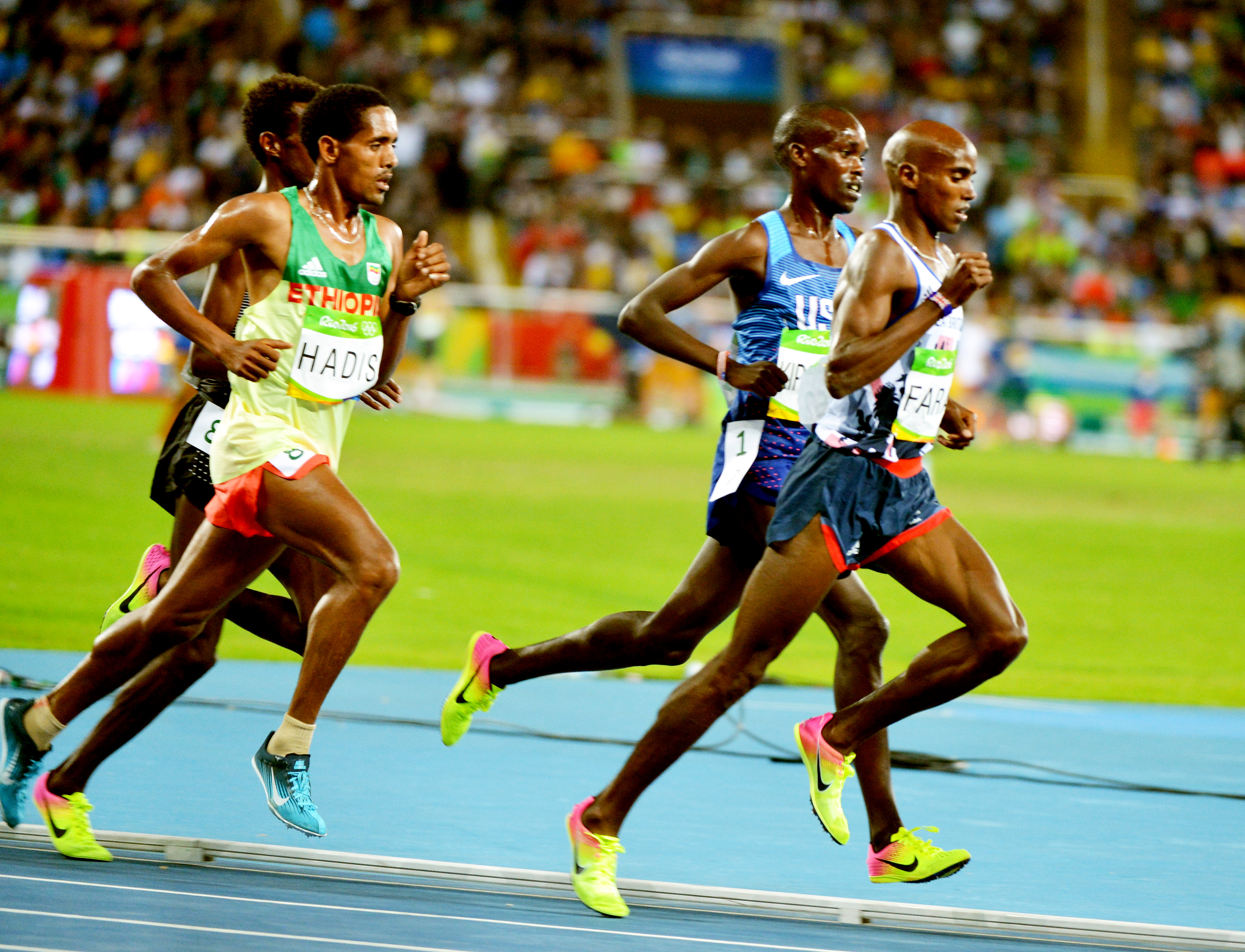
Mo Farah leading in the men's 10,000 metres final

The second day opened with a first in Olympic history as a man succeeded his brother as Olympic champion. In a dramatic final round, German discus thrower Christoph Harting moved up from fourth to gold medal position with a personal best throw and topped the podium as his brother Robert Harting had four years earlier. Mo Farah – a double-Olympic champion from 2012 – defended his 10,000 m crown in spite of a fall which saw him slip to the back of the pack during the middle of race. Farah had been one of three gold medallists for Great Britain on a "Super Saturday" for the host nation at the 2012 London Games, but the two others of that day did not prevail in Rio de Janeiro. Jessica Ennis entered as favourite for the Olympic heptathlon but was runner-up to Belgian Nafissatou Thiam in an upset which saw the 21-year-old add over three hundred points to her personal best score. Defending Olympic long jump champion Greg Rutherford was reduced to third place as American Jeff Henderson won the closely fought men's competition. Another defending champion was dethroned in the women's 100 metres: Shelly-Ann Fraser-Pryce's attempt to become the first person to win three straight Olympic track titles was thwarted by Jamaican teammate Elaine Thompson.

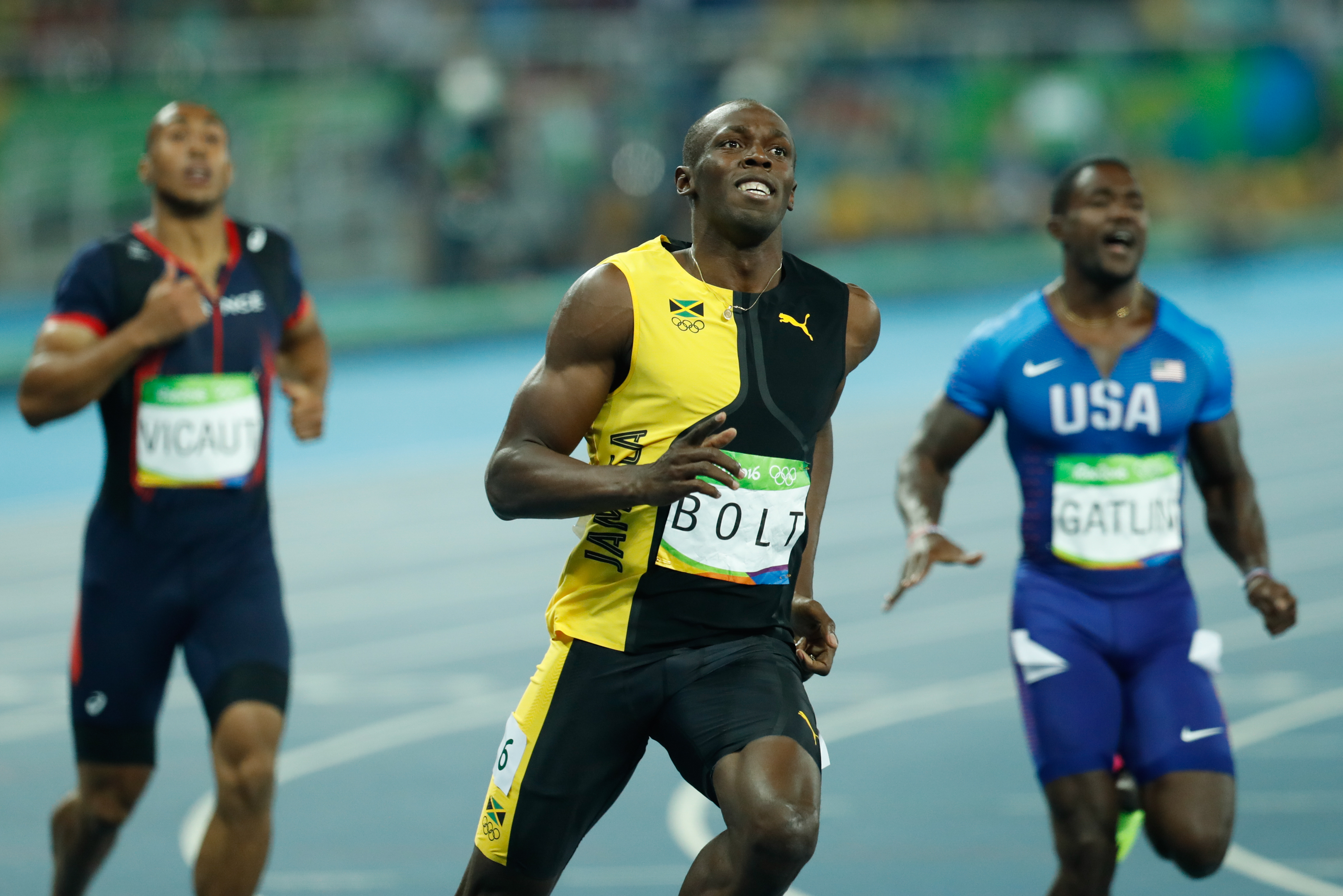
Usain Bolt winning the 100 m final

The morning final for the third day was the women's marathon, which saw Jemima Sumgong win Kenya's first Olympic gold medal for that event. The race was unusual in that two sets of twins crossed the line together: North Korea's Kim Hye-song and Kim Hye-gyong took tenth and eleventh while Germans Anna and Lisa Hahner were 81st and 82nd. Furthermore, Estonia's Lily, Leila and Liina Luik became the first triplets to feature in an Olympic final. In the women's triple jump Caterine Ibargüen won Colombia's first Olympic gold medal in athletics. As the first Olympics to be held in South America, Ibargüen became the first Olympic athletics champion from South America to be crowned on South American soil. Brazil's Thiago Braz da Silva became the second two days later. By the conclusion of the Olympics, Ibargüen, Yulimar Rojas (who finished second to Ibargüen) and da Silva were the only medalists from continental South America. Usain Bolt achieved the feat fellow Jamaican Fraser-Pryce had failed to do one day earlier by taking his third straight Olympic 100 m title. This made him the most decorated athlete in the 100 metres at the Olympics. South Africa's Wayde van Niekerk provided the second world record performance of the athletics programme with his win of the men's 400 metres in 43.03 seconds. This knocked 0.15 seconds of Michael Johnson's time which had gone unbeaten since 1999.

=== Days 4, 5 and 6 ===
The third and last athletics world record at the Olympics came on day four. Poland's Anita Włodarczyk was dominant in the hammer throw, becoming the first woman to throw beyond eighty metres three times in a competition and adding over a metre to her own world record with 82.29 m (269 ft 11 3/4 in). Four of her six throws would have been sufficient to win. Another record was in sight for Ruth Jebet in the women's 3000 metres steeplechase, though she missed the mark by a second after slowing to celebrate winning Bahrain's first Olympic gold in any sport. In the women's 400 m Allyson Felix was stopped from winning an historic fifth Olympic gold by Shaunae Miller of the Bahamas, who dove at the line to win the race. Men's 800 metres world record holder David Rudisha defended his 800 m Olympic title, being the first man in over half a century to achieve that. A surprise victory for the hosts came via Thiago Braz da Silva, who added ten centimetres to his previous best to win in an Olympic record of 6.03 m ahead of world record holder Renaud Lavillenie of France. Departing from Olympic traditions, the home crowd booed Lavillenie while he was attempting his final vault and he was booed again at the medal ceremony after comparing his treatment to that of Jesse Owens at the 1936 Summer Olympics in Nazi Germany. The partisan treatment was criticised by da Silva, IOC President Thomas Bach and IAAF president Sebastian Coe, though defended by some as an intrinsic part of Brazilian sporting culture.

On the fifth morning, Croatia's Sandra Perković became the only woman to defend an individual Olympic athletics title that year, topping the discus podium. Christian Taylor became the only man in the field events to defend his 2012 Olympic title, repeating his American 1–2 finish with teammate Will Claye. The United States was less successful in the men's 110 metres hurdles: its athletes failed to gain a medal for the first time ever (bar the 1980 boycott) while Jamaican Omar McLeod won by over a tenth of a second. Faith Kipyegon was a clear winner in the women's 1500 metres ahead of Ethiopia's Genzebe Dibaba. Derek Drouin won Canada's first Olympic gold in athletics in twenty years in the men's high jump. In the women's 5000 m heats American Abbey D'Agostino and Nikki Hamblin of New Zealand fell during the race. D'Agostino stopped to help Hamblin to her feet, but then struggled herself with what would be diagnosed as a torn ACL, which led Hamblin to help in turn so the pair could finish. The pair were later given the Fair Play award by the International Fair Play Committee for their show of sportsmanship.

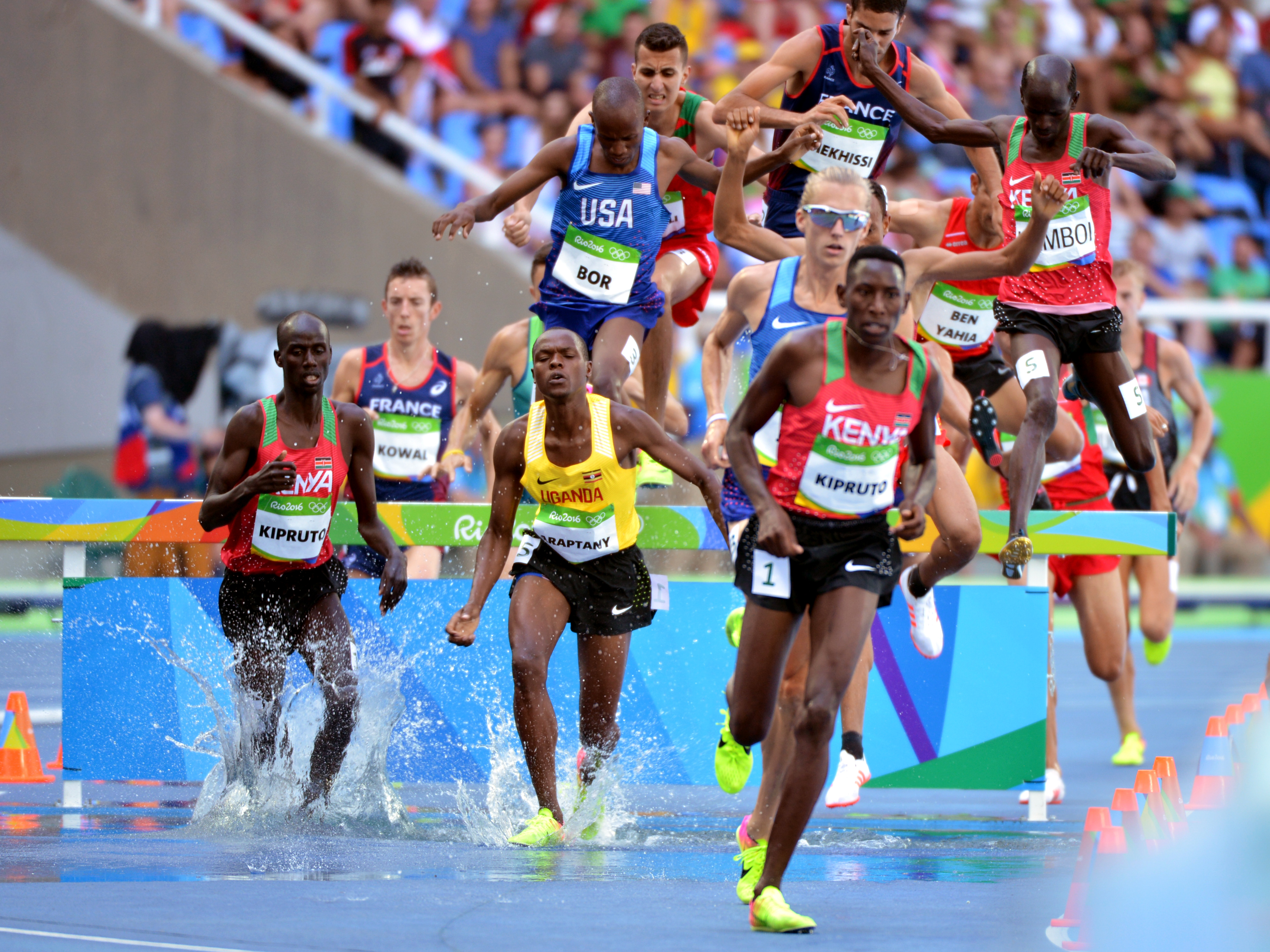
Conseslus Kipruto en route to the steeplechase title

In his last Olympic outing, Ezekiel Kemboi failed to defend his Olympic steeplechase title, which went to his Kenyan teammate Conseslus Kipruto in an Olympic record time. Kemboi's initial bronze medal would have made him the first person to win three Olympic steeplechase medals, but a single step into the infield later saw him disqualified and Mahiedine Mekhissi-Benabbad of France achieve that feat in his place. Tianna Bartoletta beat the favourite in the women's long jump, clearing a personal best of 7.17 m in the second to last round to leave her American rival Brittney Reese with a silver medal. Americans also occupied the top spots in the women's 100 metres hurdles with Brianna Rollins, Nia Ali and Kristi Castlin forming the first ever Olympic medal sweep by a nation in that event. The 100 m gold medallist Elaine Thompson completed a sprint double for Jamaica by defeating Dutch athlete Dafne Schippers in the women's 200 metres final. High-profile eliminations came in the men's qualifiers as two strong contenders for Olympic titles, Paweł Fajdek in the hammer and Justin Gatlin in the 200 m, failed to progress.

=== Final three days ===
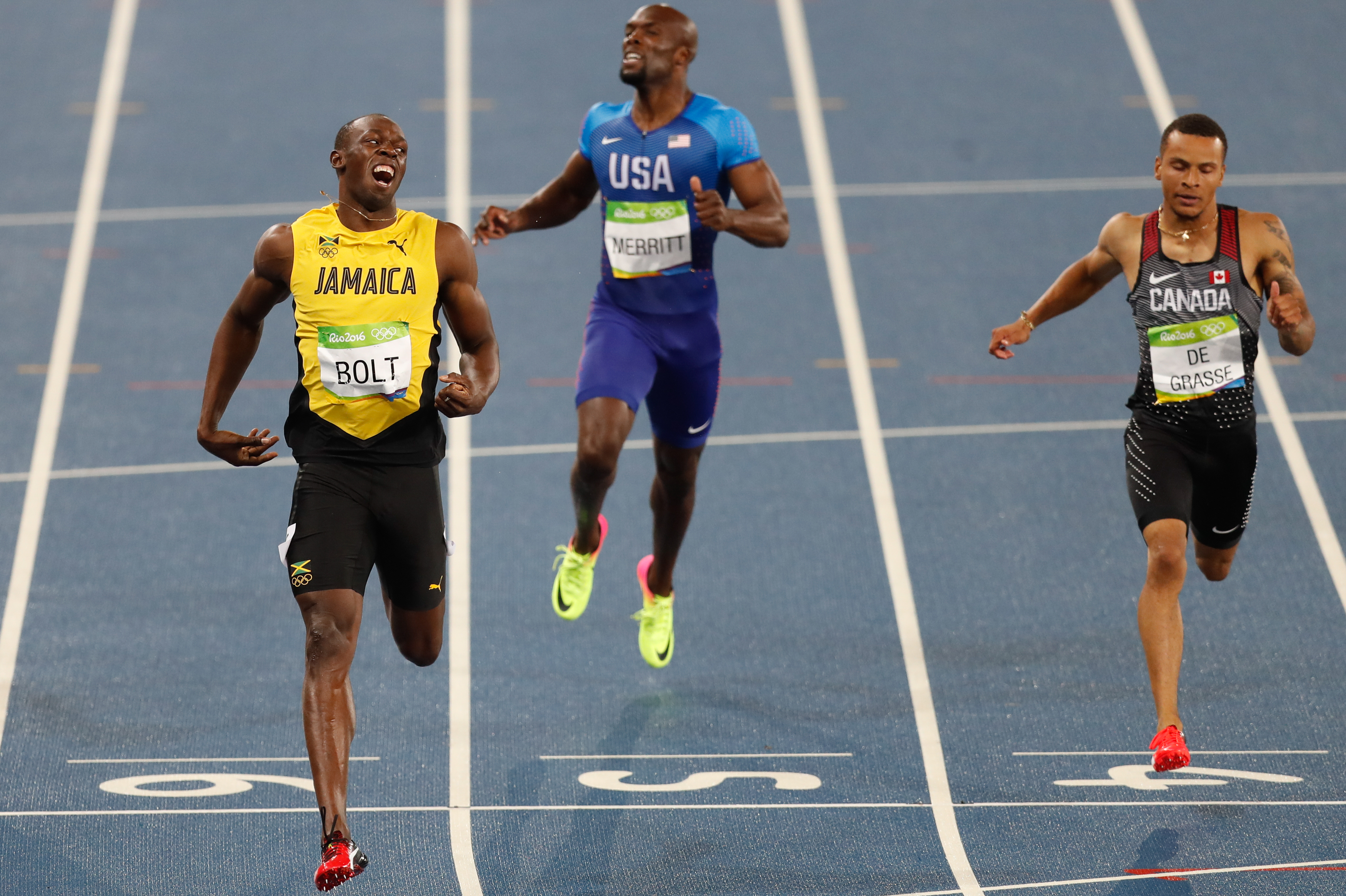
Bolt with his third 200 m victory

The 400 metres hurdles finals were contested on day seven: Kerron Clement won the United States's 19th men's title and in contrast Dalilah Muhammad became the first American female winner. On a day of strong American performances, Ashton Eaton defended his decathlon title in an Olympic record score of 8893 points and in the men's shot put Ryan Crouser greatly improved his best to 22.52 m (73 ft 10 1/2 in) to break Ulf Timmermann's Olympic record from 1988 (among men's Olympic records, only Bob Beamon's long jump had stood for longer). The women's javelin throw had an unexpected winner in Croatia's Sara Kolak, whose winning mark of 66.18 m (217 ft 1 1/2 in) meant the 21-year-old had improved her best by over eight metres that year. The favourite delivered in the men's 200 m, with Usain Bolt taking his third straight Olympic 200 m title by a margin of a quarter of a second. The women's 4 × 100 metres relay heats featured the first ever re-run – Brazil has obstructed the American baton handover and the United States were allowed a solo run to qualify for the final on time, which they did.

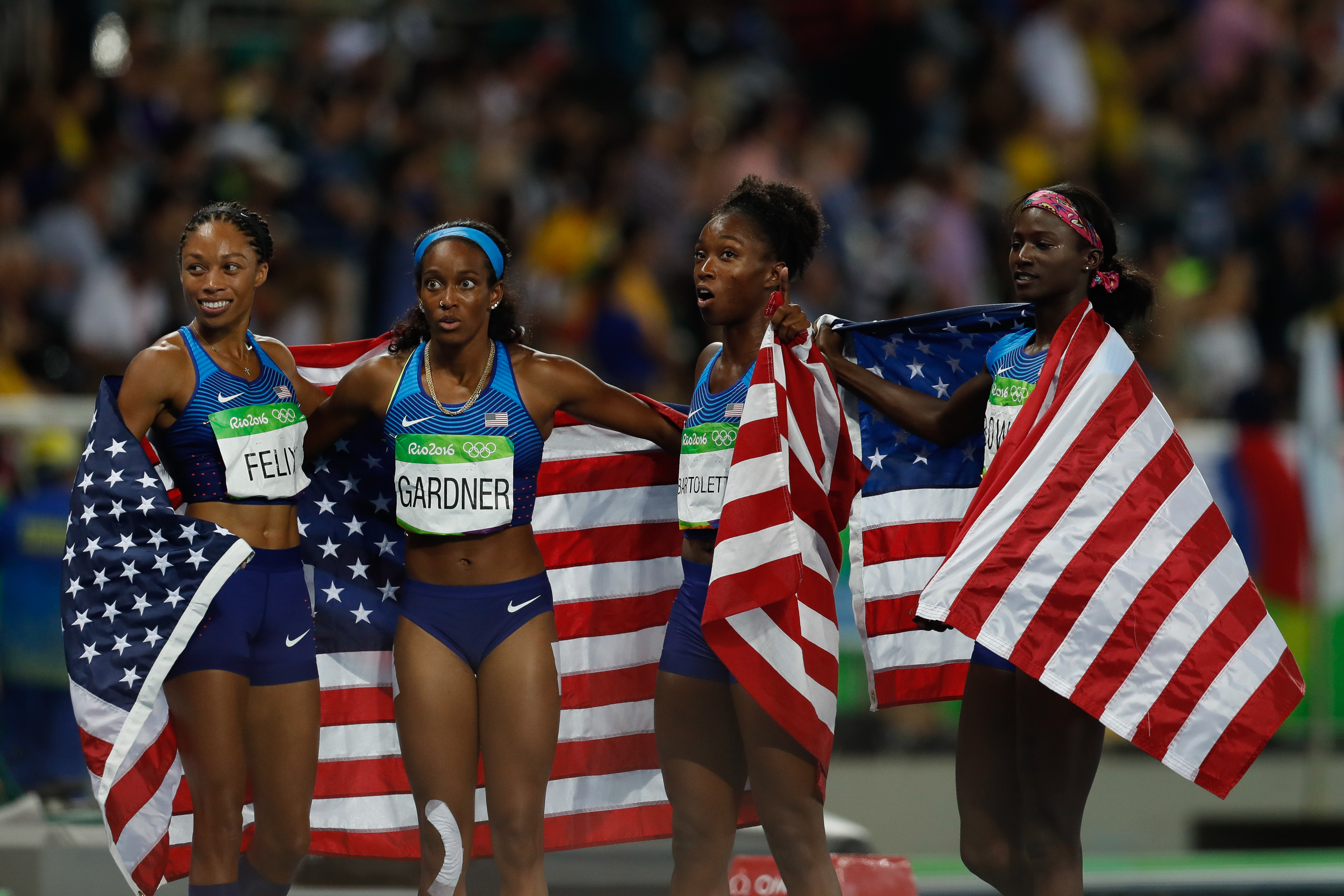
The American team after winning 4 × 100 m relay gold

The morning of the penultimate day began with two racewalking finals. In the men's 50 km walk Matej Tóth overtook defending champion Jared Tallent to win Slovakia's first Olympic gold in athletics while Liu Hong returned China to the top of the women's 20 km walk podium. Katerina Stefanidi of Greece won the women's pole vault after the pre-event favourites faltered. Dilshod Nazarov made history in the men's hammer throw by becoming Tajikistan's first Olympic gold medallist. Vivian Cheruiyot achieved a first for her country in the women's 5000 metres by outrunning 10,000 m champion Almaz Ayana to take Kenya's first ever gold in the distance event. In that race, Cheruiyot set the last of eight Olympic records in Rio. The 4 × 100 m finals delivered new highs for Olympic athletics. The American women overcame their qualification troubles by winning from uncomfortable lane one, making Allyson Felix the most successful female Olympian in athletics at five gold medals. Usain Bolt anchored the Jamaican men to the gold to complete a set of three consecutive victories across the 100 m, 200 m and relay (referred to as a "treble treble"). Bolt equalled Carl Lewis and Paavo Nurmi's record of nine Olympic gold medals in athletics.

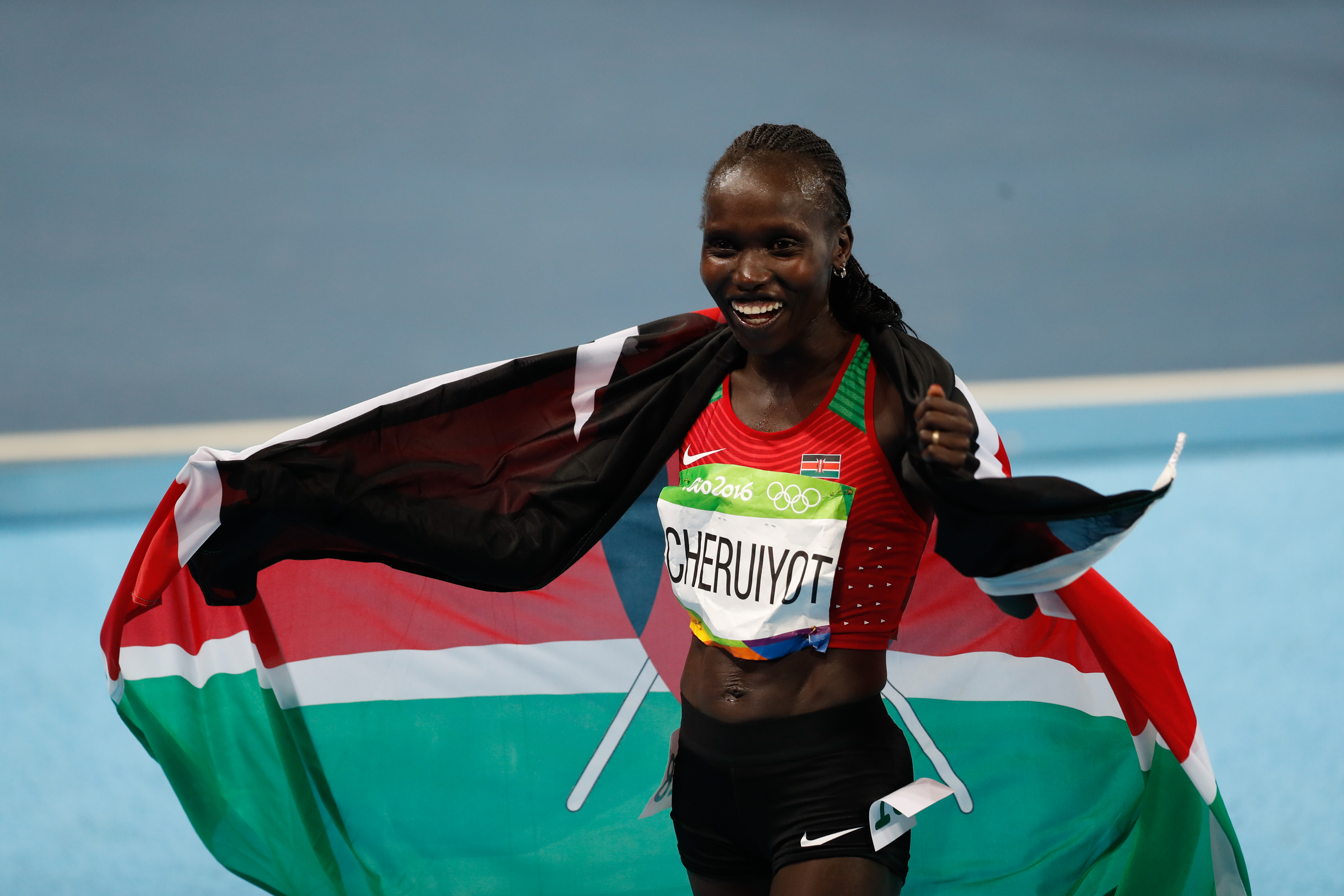
Vivian Cheruiyot celebrating Kenya's first 5000 m women's title

On the ninth and final day of action in the track and field stadium, Matthew Centrowitz Jr. secured a tactical win in the men's 1500 m while Caster Semenya used her sheer speed to win the women's 800 m. Behind her Francine Niyonsaba won only the second ever medal for Burundi at the Olympics. In the women's high jump, Ruth Beitia became Spain's inaugural female Olympic gold medalist in athletics, though this was overshadowed by the fact her winning mark was the lowest since 1980 and she was outperformed by two heptathletes in Rio. Thomas Röhler cleared ninety metres to win the men's javelin throw. Mo Farah became the second most successful track athlete of the 2016 Rio Olympics by defending his 5000 m title, making him one of only two men alongside Finland's Lasse Virén to have defended both long-distance titles at consecutive Olympics. In the last track events of the games, the United States won the men's and women's 4 × 400 metres relays. The women's victory gave Allyson Felix the distinction of setting a medals record for women's Olympic athletics; six gold medals and nine medals overall. In the closing competition of the Olympics, Eliud Kipchoge of Kenya comfortably won the marathon by the largest margin since 1972. The runner-up Feyisa Lilesa of Ethiopia made a political protest by crossing his arms near the finish line in solidarity with the Oromo killed in protests that year and later suggested he would seek asylum.

The United States won the most medals in athletics and at thirteen golds and 32 overall they won more than double the next most successful nations. In the absence of Russia, Kenya and Jamaica placed second and third with six gold medals and were the other nations to win more than ten medals in total. In the 2016 Olympic athletics programme, 141 medals were awarded and 43 nations reached the medal table.

== Medal summary ==
=== Medal table ===
Key

* Host nation (Brazil)

Rank	Nation	Gold	Silver	Bronze	Total
1	United States	13	10	9	32
2	Kenya	6	6	1	13
3	Jamaica	6	3	2	11
4	China	2	2	2	6
5	South Africa	2	2	0	4
6	Great Britain	2	1	4	7
7	Croatia	2	0	1	3
7	Germany	2	0	1	3
9	Ethiopia	1	2	5	8
10	Canada	1	1	4	6
11	Poland	1	1	1	3
12	Bahrain	1	1	0	2
12	Spain	1	1	0	2
14	Bahamas	1	0	1	2
15	Belgium	1	0	0	1
15	Brazil*	1	0	0	1
15	Colombia	1	0	0	1
15	Greece	1	0	0	1
15	Slovakia	1	0	0	1
15	Tajikistan	1	0	0	1
21	France	0	3	3	6
22	Algeria	0	2	0	2
23	New Zealand	0	1	3	4
24	Australia	0	1	1	2
24	Japan	0	1	1	2
26	Belarus	0	1	0	1
26	Bulgaria	0	1	0	1
26	Burundi	0	1	0	1
26	Denmark	0	1	0	1
26	Grenada	0	1	0	1
26	Mexico	0	1	0	1
26	Netherlands	0	1	0	1
26	Qatar	0	1	0	1
26	Venezuela	0	1	0	1
35	Cuba	0	0	1	1
35	Czech Republic	0	0	1	1
35	Hungary	0	0	1	1
35	Kazakhstan	0	0	1	1
35	Serbia	0	0	1	1
35	Trinidad and Tobago	0	0	1	1
35	Turkey	0	0	1	1
35	Ukraine	0	0	1	1
Totals (42 entries)		47	47	47	141

=== Men ===
Event	Gold		Silver		Bronze	
100 metres	Usain Bolt; Jamaica	9.81 SB	Justin Gatlin; United States	9.89	Andre De Grasse; Canada	9.91 PB
200 metres	Usain Bolt; Jamaica	19.78	Andre De Grasse; Canada	20.02	Christophe Lemaitre; France	20.12
400 metres	Wayde van Niekerk; South Africa	43.03 WR	Kirani James; Grenada	43.76	LaShawn Merritt; United States	43.85
800 metres	David Rudisha; Kenya	1:42.15	Taoufik Makhloufi; Algeria	1:42.61 NR	Clayton Murphy; United States	1:42.93
1500 metres	Matthew Centrowitz Jr. United States	3:50.00	Taoufik Makhloufi; Algeria	3:50.11	Nick Willis; New Zealand	3:50.24
5000 metres	Mo Farah; Great Britain	13:03.30	Paul Chelimo; United States	13:03.90	Hagos Gebrhiwet; Ethiopia	13:04.35
10,000 metres	Mo Farah; Great Britain	27:05.17	Paul Tanui; Kenya	27:05.64	Tamirat Tola; Ethiopia	27:06.26
110 metres hurdles	Omar McLeod; Jamaica	13.05	Orlando Ortega; Spain	13.17	Dimitri Bascou; France	13.24
400 metres hurdles	Kerron Clement; United States	47.73	Boniface Tumuti; Kenya	47.78 NR	Yasmani Copello; Turkey	47.92 NR
3000 metres steeplechase	Conseslus Kipruto; Kenya	8:03.28 OR	Evan Jager; United States	8:04.28	Mahiedine Mekhissi-Benabbad; France	8:11.52
4 × 100 metres relay	Jamaica; Asafa Powell; Yohan Blake; Nickel Ashmeade; Usain Bolt; Jevaughn Minzie*; Kemar Bailey-Cole*	37.27	Japan; Ryota Yamagata; Shota Iizuka; Yoshihide Kiryu; Asuka Cambridge	37.60 AR	Canada; Akeem Haynes; Aaron Brown; Brendon Rodney; Andre De Grasse; Bolade Ajomale*	37.64 NR
4 × 400 metres relay	United States; Arman Hall; Tony McQuay; Gil Roberts; LaShawn Merritt; Kyle Clemons*; David Verburg*	2:57.30	Jamaica; Peter Matthews; Nathon Allen; Fitzroy Dunkley; Javon Francis; Rusheen McDonald*	2:58.16	Bahamas; Alonzo Russell; Michael Mathieu; Steven Gardiner; Chris Brown; Stephen Newbold*	2:58.49
Marathon	Eliud Kipchoge; Kenya	2:08:44	Feyisa Lilesa; Ethiopia	2:09:54	Galen Rupp; United States	2:10:05
20 kilometres walk	Wang Zhen; China	1:19:14	Cai Zelin; China	1:19:26	Dane Bird-Smith; Australia	1:19:37
50 kilometres walk	Matej Tóth; Slovakia	3:40:58	Jared Tallent; Australia	3:41:16	Hirooki Arai; Japan	3:41:24
High jump	Derek Drouin; Canada	2.38 m	Mutaz Essa Barshim; Qatar	2.36 m	Bohdan Bondarenko; Ukraine	2.33 m
Pole vault	Thiago Braz da Silva; Brazil	6.03 m OR, AR	Renaud Lavillenie; France	5.98 m	Sam Kendricks; United States	5.85 m
Long jump	Jeff Henderson; United States	8.38 m	Luvo Manyonga; South Africa	8.37 m	Greg Rutherford; Great Britain	8.29 m
Triple jump	Christian Taylor; United States	17.86 m	Will Claye; United States	17.76 m	Dong Bin; China	17.58 m
Shot put	Ryan Crouser; United States	22.52 m OR	Joe Kovacs; United States	21.78 m	Tomas Walsh; New Zealand	21.36 m
Discus throw	Christoph Harting; Germany	68.37 m	Piotr Małachowski; Poland	67.55 m	Daniel Jasinski; Germany	67.05 m
Hammer throw	Dilshod Nazarov; Tajikistan	78.68 m	Ivan Tsikhan; Belarus	77.79 m	Wojciech Nowicki; Poland	77.73 m
Javelin throw	Thomas Röhler; Germany	90.30 m	Julius Yego; Kenya	88.24 m	Keshorn Walcott; Trinidad and Tobago	85.38 m
Decathlon	Ashton Eaton; United States	8893 pts OR	Kévin Mayer; France	8834 pts NR	Damian Warner; Canada	8666 pts

* Indicates the athlete only competed in the preliminary heats and received medals.

=== Women ===
Event	Gold		Silver		Bronze	
100 metres	Elaine Thompson; Jamaica	10.71	Tori Bowie; United States	10.83	Shelly-Ann Fraser-Pryce; Jamaica	10.86
200 metres	Elaine Thompson; Jamaica	21.78	Dafne Schippers; Netherlands	21.88	Tori Bowie; United States	22.15
400 metres	Shaunae Miller; Bahamas	49.44	Allyson Felix; United States	49.51	Shericka Jackson; Jamaica	49.85
800 metres	Caster Semenya; South Africa	1:55.28 NR	Francine Niyonsaba; Burundi	1:56.49	Margaret Wambui; Kenya	1:56.89
1500 metres	Faith Kipyegon; Kenya	4:08.92	Genzebe Dibaba; Ethiopia	4:10.27	Jennifer Simpson; United States	4:10.53
5000 metres	Vivian Cheruiyot; Kenya	14:26.17 OR	Hellen Onsando Obiri; Kenya	14:29.77	Almaz Ayana; Ethiopia	14:33.59
10,000 metres	Almaz Ayana; Ethiopia	29:17.45 WR	Vivian Cheruiyot; Kenya	29:32.53 NR	Tirunesh Dibaba; Ethiopia	29:42.56
100 metres hurdles	Brianna Rollins; United States	12.48	Nia Ali; United States	12.59	Kristi Castlin; United States	12.61
400 metres hurdles	Dalilah Muhammad; United States	53.13	Sara Petersen; Denmark	53.55 NR	Ashley Spencer; United States	53.72
3000 metres steeplechase	Ruth Jebet; Bahrain	8:59.75 AR	Hyvin Jepkemoi; Kenya	9:07.12	Emma Coburn; United States	9:07.63 AR
4 × 100 metres relay	United States; Tianna Bartoletta; Allyson Felix; English Gardner; Tori Bowie; Morolake Akinosun*	41.02	Jamaica; Christania Williams; Elaine Thompson; Veronica Campbell-Brown; Shelly-Ann Fraser-Pryce; Simone Facey*; Sashalee Forbes*	41.36	Great Britain; Asha Philip; Desirèe Henry; Dina Asher-Smith; Daryll Neita	41.77 NR
4 × 400 metres relay	United States; Courtney Okolo; Natasha Hastings; Phyllis Francis; Allyson Felix; Taylor Ellis-Watson*; Francena McCorory*	3:19.06	Jamaica; Stephenie Ann McPherson; Anneisha McLaughlin-Whilby; Shericka Jackson; Novlene Williams-Mills; Christine Day*; Chrisann Gordon*	3:20.34	Great Britain; Eilidh Doyle; Anyika Onuora; Emily Diamond; Christine Ohuruogu; Kelly Massey*	3:25.88
Marathon	Jemima Sumgong; Kenya	2:24:04	Eunice Kirwa; Bahrain	2:24:13	Mare Dibaba; Ethiopia	2:24:30
20 kilometres walk	Liu Hong; China	1:28:35	Lupita González; Mexico	1:28:37	Lü Xiuzhi; China	1:28:42
High jump	Ruth Beitia; Spain	1.97 m	Mirela Demireva; Bulgaria	1.97 m	Blanka Vlašić; Croatia	1.97 m
Pole vault	Ekaterini Stefanidi; Greece	4.85 m	Sandi Morris; United States	4.85 m	Eliza McCartney; New Zealand	4.80 m NR
Long jump	Tianna Bartoletta; United States	7.17 m	Brittney Reese; United States	7.15 m	Ivana Španović; Serbia	7.08 m NR
Triple jump	Caterine Ibargüen; Colombia	15.17 m	Yulimar Rojas; Venezuela	14.98 m	Olga Rypakova; Kazakhstan	14.74 m
Shot put	Michelle Carter; United States	20.63 m NR	Valerie Adams; New Zealand	20.42 m	Anita Márton; Hungary	19.87 m NR
Discus throw	Sandra Perković; Croatia	69.21 m	Mélina Robert-Michon; France	66.73 m NR	Denia Caballero; Cuba	65.34 m
Hammer throw	Anita Włodarczyk; Poland	82.29 m WR	Zhang Wenxiu; China	76.75 m	Sophie Hitchon; Great Britain	74.54 m NR
Javelin throw	Sara Kolak; Croatia	66.18 m NR	Sunette Viljoen; South Africa	64.92 m	Barbora Špotáková; Czech Republic	64.80 m
Heptathlon	Nafissatou Thiam; Belgium	6810 pts NR	Jessica Ennis-Hill; Great Britain	6775 pts	Brianne Theisen-Eaton; Canada	6653 pts

* Indicates the athlete only competed in the preliminary heats and received medals.

== Records ==
=== World and Olympic records ===
Event	Date	Name	Nationality	Result	Type
Women's 10,000 metres	12 August	Almaz Ayana	Ethiopia	29:17.45 min	WR
Men's 400 metres	14 August	Wayde van Niekerk	South Africa	43.03 sec	WR
Women's hammer throw	15 August	Anita Włodarczyk	Poland	82.29 m	WR
Men's pole vault	15 August	Thiago Braz da Silva	Brazil	6.03 m	OR
Men's 3000 metres steeplechase	17 August	Conseslus Kipruto	Kenya	8:03.28 min	OR
Men's shot put	18 August	Ryan Crouser	United States	22.52 m	OR
Men's decathlon	18 August	Ashton Eaton	United States	8893 pts	=OR
Women's 5000 metres	19 August	Vivian Cheruiyot	Kenya	14:26.17 min	OR

=== Continental records ===
The women's 10,000 metres provided the first two continental records of the Olympics, in Almaz Ayana's African record and Molly Huddle's record for the North, Central American and Caribbean region.

Event	Date	Name	Nationality	Result	Type
Women's 10,000 metres	12 August	Almaz Ayana	Ethiopia	29:17.45 min	AR
Women's 10,000 metres	12 August	Molly Huddle	United States	30:13.17 min	AR
Men's 400 metres	14 August	Wayde van Niekerk	South Africa	43.03 sec	AR
3000 metres steeplechase	15 August	Ruth Jebet	Bahrain	8:59.75 min	AR
3000 metres steeplechase	15 August	Emma Coburn	United States	9:07.63 min	AR
Women's hammer throw	15 August	Anita Włodarczyk	Poland	82.29 m	AR
Men's 4 × 100 m relay	18 August	Tang Xingqiang; Xie Zhenye; Su Bingtian; Zhang Peimeng	China	37.82 sec	AR
Men's 4 × 100 m relay	18 August	Ryota Yamagata; Shota Iizuka; Yoshihide Kiryu; Asuka Cambridge	Japan	37.68 sec	AR
Men's 4 × 100 m relay	19 August	Ryota Yamagata; Shota Iizuka; Yoshihide Kiryu; Asuka Cambridge	Japan	37.60 sec	AR

== Participation ==
=== Participating nations ===
Russia's athletics team was banned from competing at the 2016 Summer Olympics on June 17, 2016, when the IAAF voted unanimously to prevent them from competing. This punishment is because of the ongoing Russian doping scandal. Darya Klishina was the only Russian athlete allowed to participate.

The Refugee Olympic Team, in its first appearance, included six track and field athletes among it 10-strong team.

Participating National Olympic Committees
- Afghanistan
- Albania
- Algeria
- American Samoa
- Andorra
- Angola
- Antigua and Barbuda
- Argentina
- Armenia
- Australia
- Austria
- Azerbaijan
- Bahamas
- Bahrain
- Bangladesh
- Barbados
- Belarus
- Belgium
- Belize
- Benin
- Bermuda
- Bolivia
- Bosnia and Herzegovina
- Botswana
- Brazil (host)
- British Virgin Islands
- Brunei
- Bulgaria
- Burkina Faso
- Burundi
- Cambodia
- Cameroon
- Canada
- Cape Verde
- Cayman Islands
- Central African Republic
- Chad
- Chile
- China
- Chinese Taipei
- Colombia
- Comoros
- Republic of the Congo
- Cook Islands
- Costa Rica
- Croatia
- Cuba
- Cyprus
- Czech Republic
- Democratic Republic of the Congo
- Denmark
- Djibouti
- Dominica
- Dominican Republic
- Ecuador
- Egypt
- El Salvador
- Equatorial Guinea
- Eritrea
- Estonia
- Ethiopia
- Federated States of Micronesia
- Fiji
- Finland
- France
- Gabon
- The Gambia
- Georgia
- Germany
- Ghana
- Great Britain
- Greece
- Grenada
- Guam
- Guatemala
- Guinea
- Guinea-Bissau
- Guyana
- Haiti
- Honduras
- Hong Kong
- Hungary
- Iceland
- Independent Olympic Athletes
- India
- Indonesia
- Iran
- Ireland
- Israel
- Italy
- Ivory Coast
- Jamaica
- Japan
- Jordan
- Kazakhstan
- Kenya
- Kiribati
- Kosovo
- Kyrgyzstan
- Laos
- Latvia
- Lebanon
- Lesotho
- Liberia
- Libya
- Lithuania
- Luxembourg
- Macedonia
- Madagascar
- Malawi
- Malaysia
- Maldives
- Mali
- Malta
- Marshall Islands
- Mauritania
- Mauritius
- Mexico
- Moldova
- Monaco
- Mongolia
- Montenegro
- Morocco
- Mozambique
- Myanmar
- Namibia
- Nepal
- Netherlands
- New Zealand
- Nicaragua
- Niger
- Nigeria
- North Korea
- Norway
- Oman
- Pakistan
- Palau
- Palestine
- Panama
- Papua New Guinea
- Paraguay
- Peru
- Philippines
- Poland
- Portugal
- Puerto Rico
- Qatar
- Refugee Olympic Team
- Russia
- Romania
- Rwanda
- Saint Kitts and Nevis
- Saint Lucia
- Saint Vincent and the Grenadines
- Samoa
- San Marino
- São Tomé and Príncipe
- Saudi Arabia
- Senegal
- Serbia
- Seychelles
- Sierra Leone
- Singapore
- Slovakia
- Slovenia
- Solomon Islands
- Somalia
- South Africa
- South Korea
- South Sudan
- Spain
- Sri Lanka
- Sudan
- Suriname
- Swaziland
- Sweden
- Switzerland
- Syria
- Tajikistan
- Tanzania
- Thailand
- Timor-Leste
- Togo
- Tonga
- Trinidad and Tobago
- Tunisia
- Turkey
- Turkmenistan
- Tuvalu
- Uganda
- Ukraine
- United Arab Emirates
- United States
- Uruguay
- Uzbekistan
- Venezuela
- Vietnam
- Virgin Islands
- Yemen
- Zambia
- Zimbabwe

== Doping ==
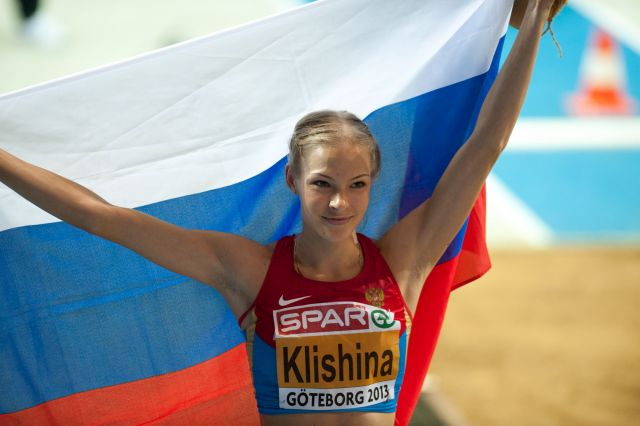
Russian Darya Klishina

The Olympic athletics competition was majorly affected by the ban of the All-Russia Athletic Federation (ARAF) by the sports governing body, the International Association of Athletics Federations (IAAF). The IAAF undertook this action to exclude all Russian athletes following the discovery of state-sponsored doping in Russia. The Russian President accused the body of discrimination against his country's athletes, saying the ban was a "collective punishment which has nothing to do with justice". The Russian Minister for Sport, Vitaly Mutko, was directly implicated in the investigations.

The members of Russia's 68-strong team were allowed to appeal the ban and compete under a neutral flag if they could present evidence that they did not have links with the doping scandal and received testing independent of the Russian national anti-doping body. Only one athlete, long jumper Darya Klishina, met the criteria and was allowed to compete. The IOC rejected the idea of Russian athletes competing under a neutral flag, and allowed Klishina to compete under a Russian flag. Her selection garnered negative press in her home country. The situation led pole vaulter Yelena Isinbayeva, one of Russia's top athletes, to announce her intention to stand for ARAF President to resolve the crisis.

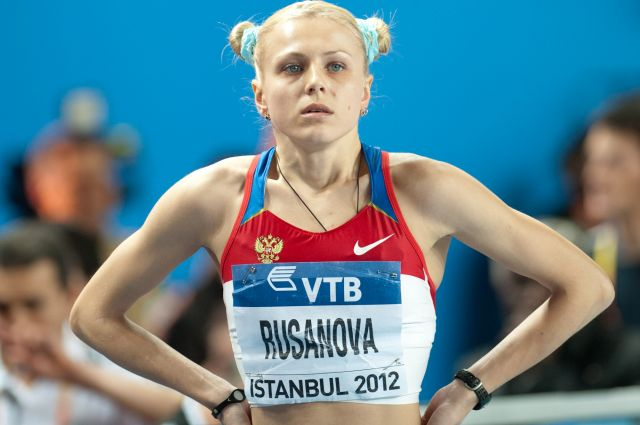
Doping whistleblower Yuliya Stepanova was not allowed to compete

Yuliya Stepanova, a Russian runner who was key in unveiling the doping issue through her whistleblowing, attempted to gain permission from the International Olympic Committee to compete at the Games as an independent athlete, but was unsuccessful on the basis of her having previously failed a doping test. Her husband and coach Vitaly Stepanov, who also acted as whistleblower, said that the decision sent "a message that the World Anti-Doping Code and the values of Olympism are merely words on a page". The couple's actions were widely denounced in Russia, with the president's spokesman labelling the couple as "Judas". Stepanova received strong support from Travis Tygart, the head of the United States Anti-Doping Agency, who approved of her application to compete.

Silvia Danekova of Bulgaria was the first athletics doping suspension at the Olympics, as the sample she had given on arrival was positive for EPO. Two Kenyan officials were also sent home on doping points: coach John Anzrah impersonated runner Ferguson Rotich to give a doping control and Michael Rotich was expelled following allegations of forewarning athletes of unannounced drug tests.

== Officiating decisions ==
The judgement of track officials came under scrutiny at the 2016 Summer Olympics as a result of several unusual and contested decisions. Torrential rain began before the heats of the men's 110 metres hurdles but the decision was made for the competition to continue. The hurdlers fared poorly, many clattering hurdles, and the session was postponed after two races. The remaining three heats were done in clear weather and all four fastest non-qualifier spots for the semi-finals came from those heats. Upon protest, the track officials allowed the eight non-qualifiers of the first two heats to run yet another heat to try to achieve the time – an unprecedented move. Jamaica's Deuce Carter forced Serbia's Milan Ristić out of the semi-finals as a result.

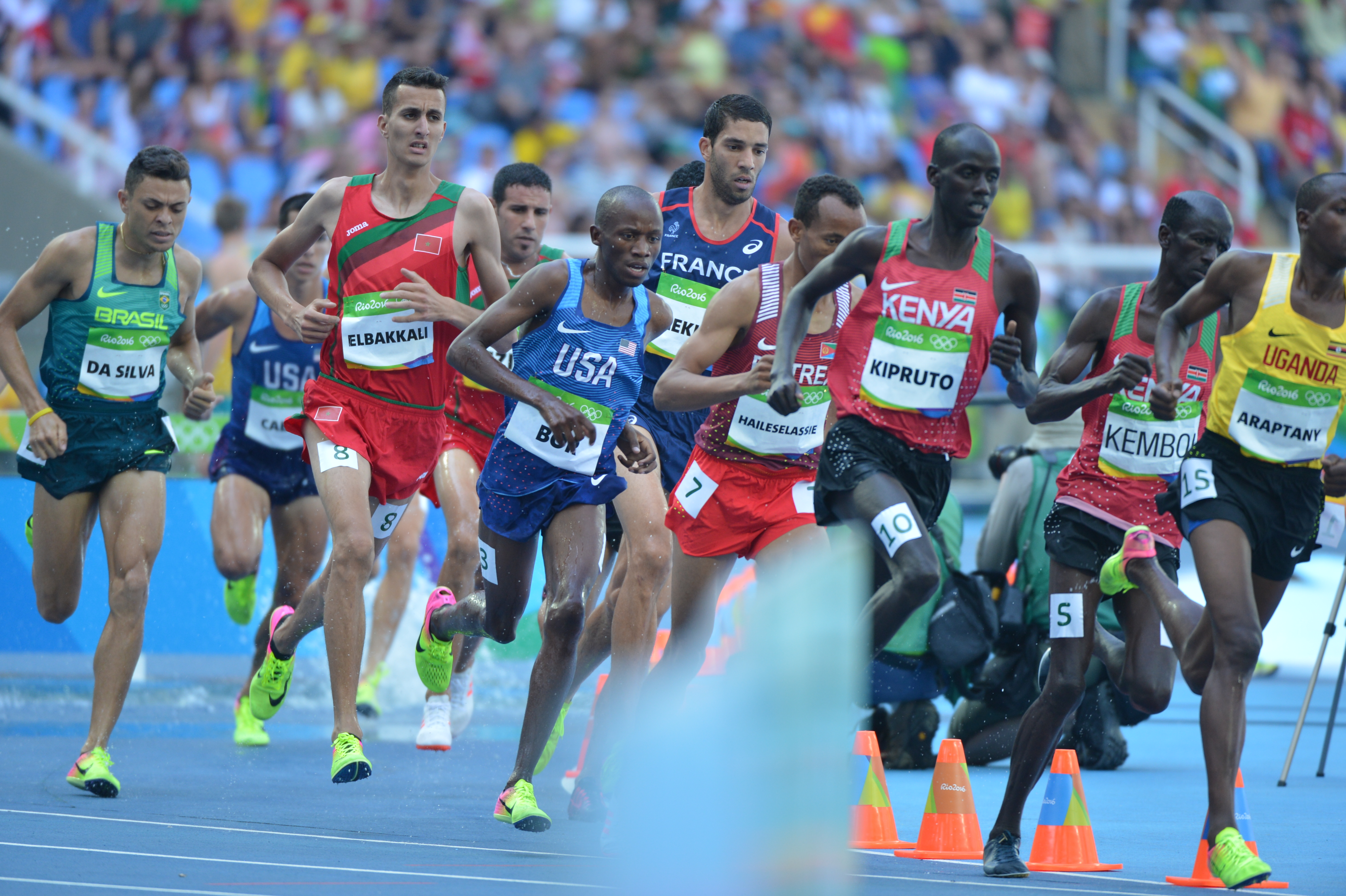
Mahiedine Mekhissi-Benabbad of France (centre) controversially won a medal on appeal

In the men's high jump Great Britain's Robbie Grabarz rattled the bar at 2.33 m – the judge raised the white flag, but the bar fell off the standards immediately after and a red flag was instead raised. The Briton protested the decision and the jump was allowed to stand due to the premature white flag. The British team suffered reversed fortunes before the officials in the men's 4 × 400 metres relay. The team were the winners of their heat but were disqualified as a track side judge noted that part of Matthew Hudson-Smith's foot was outside of red-marked baton change over zone when he started his run. Great Britain appealed the decision but because no conclusive video evidence could be found to inform the appeal, the judge's decision stood and the team were disqualified.

In the men's steeplechase, the original bronze medallist Ezekiel Kemboi saw disqualification for narrowly stepping over the track line after being bunched out at the water jump. Mahiedine Mekhissi-Benabbad noticed this and, finishing over three seconds in arrears to the Kenyan, celebrated his fourth position by raising three fingers. His appeal was successful and he became the first man to win three Olympic steeplechase medals, which Kemboi had himself expected to achieve. Kemboi had announced his retirement upon finishing third, but after the disqualification change his mind to seek to rectify the matter, saying "I have to bring back this medal not by protesting again but right on track. Kemboi is not retired I will be coming to London 2017 to re-claim my medal from France. No limits."

== See also ==
- Athletics at the 2016 Summer Paralympics
