= List of East Asian Games records in athletics =

The East Asian Games is a multi-sport event which began in 1993. Athletics has been one of the sports held at the Games since the inaugural edition. Records set by athletes who are representing one of the East Asian Games Association's member states.

== Men's records ==
Event	Record	Name	Nationality	Date	Games	Ref.
100 m	10.23	Jin Sun-Kuk	South Korea	1993	1993 Shanghai	
200 m	20.34	Shingo Suetsugu	Japan	2001	2001 Osaka	
400 m	45.25	Xu Zizhou	China	2001	2001 Osaka	
800 m	1:49.00	Mihail Kolganov	Kazakhstan	2001	2001 Osaka	
1500 m	3:46.24	Yasunori Murakami	Japan	2009	2009 Hong Kong	
5000 m	13:47.61	Yosuke Osawa	Japan	1993	1993 Shanghai	
10,000 m	28:42.19	Katsuhiko Hanada	Japan	2001	2001 Osaka	
Half marathon	1:04:49	Kazuo Ietani	Japan	2001	2001 Osaka	
110 m hurdles	13.21	Liu Xiang	China	2005	2005 Macao	
400 m hurdles	49.18	Chen Tien-Wen	Chinese Taipei	2001	2001 Osaka	
3000 m steeplechase	8:33.98	Yasunori Uchitomi	Japan	2001	2001 Osaka	
High jump	2.28 m	Lee Jin-Taek	South Korea	1997	1997 Busan	
Pole vault	5.60 m	Manabu Yokoyama	Japan	2001	2001 Osaka	
Long jump	8.34 m	Nai Hui-Fang	Chinese Taipei	1993	1993 Shanghai	
Triple jump	16.79 m	Kim Duk-Hyung	South Korea	2005	2005 Macao	
Shot put	20.41 m	Zhang Jun	China	2009	2009 Hong Kong	
Discus throw	62.58 m	Li Shaojie	China	1997	1997 Busan	
Hammer throw	79.68 m	Koji Murofushi	Japan	2001	2001 Osaka	
Javelin throw	82.97 m	Zhao Qinggang	China	9 October 2013	2013 Tianjin	
Decathlon	7995 pts	Munehiro Kaneko	Japan	1993	1993 Shanghai	
Decathlon	100m / Long jump / Shot put / High jump / 400m / 110m H / Discus / Pole vault / Javelin / 1500m					
20 km walk (road)	1:23:51	Yu Chaohong	China	2005	2005 Macao	
4 × 100 m relay	38.44	Ryota Yamagata; Shota Iizuka; Asuka Cambridge; Kazuma Oseto	Japan	9 October 2013	2013 Tianjin	
4 × 400 m relay	3:03.74	Mitsuhiro Sato; Jun Osakada; Dai Tamesue; Ryuji Muraki	Japan	2001	2001 Osaka	

== Women's records ==
Event	Record	Name	Nationality	Date	Games	Ref.
100 m	11.38	Wang Huei-Chen	Chinese Taipei	1993	1993 Shanghai	
200 m	22.87	Liu Xiaomei	China	2001	2001 Osaka	
400 m	52.31	Bu Fanfang	China	2001	2001 Osaka	
800 m	2:00.11	Liu Qing	China	2005	2005 Macao	
1500 m	4:04.42	Qu Yunxia	China	1993	1993 Shanghai	
5000 m	15:32.71	Dong Yanmei	China	2001	2001 Osaka	
10,000 m	31:31.85	Masako Chiba	Japan	1997	1997 Busan	
Half marathon	1:11:18	Mizuki Noguchi	Japan	2001	2001 Osaka	
100 m hurdles	12.93	Wu Shuijiao	China	9 October 2013	2013 Tianjin	
400 m hurdles	55.33	Huang Xiaoxiao	China	2005	2005 Macao	
3000 m steeplechase	9:53.17	Li Zhenzhu	China	9 October 2013	2013 Tianjin	
High jump	1.92 m	Miki Imai	Japan	2001	2001 Osaka	
Pole vault	4.40 m	Zhao Yingying	China	2005	2005 Macao	
Long jump	6.61 m	Guan Yingnan	China	2001	2001 Osaka	
Triple jump	14.47 m	Ren Ruiping	China	1997	1997 Busan	
Shot put	19.88 m	Zhang Liuhong	China	1993	1993 Shanghai	
Discus throw	64.66 m	Li Yanfeng	China	2009	2009 Hong Kong	
Hammer throw	72.23 m	Zhang Wenxiu	China	2005	2005 Macao	
Javelin throw	61.95 m	Ma Ning	China	2005	2005 Macao	
Heptathlon	6078 pts	Svetlana Kazanina	Kazakhstan	2001	2001 Osaka	
Heptathlon	100m H / High jump / Shot put / 200m / Long jump / Javelin / 800m					
20 km walk (road)	1:32:06	Liu Hongyu	China	2001	2001 Osaka	
4 × 100 m relay	44.08	Zeng Xiujun; Liu Xiaomei; Qin Wangping; Li Xuemei	China	2001	2001 Osaka	
4 × 400 m relay	3:30.51	Yan Jiankui; Li Yulian; Chen Yuxiang; Bu Fanfang	China	2001	2001 Osaka	

== Records in defunct events ==
=== Men's events ===
Event	Record	Athlete	Nation	Date	Games	Ref.
20,000 m walk (track)	1:21:29.1	Chen Shaoguo	China	1993	1993 Shanghai	

=== Women's events ===
Event	Record	Athlete	Nation	Date	Games	Ref.
3000 m	8:40.30	Zhang Lirong	China	1993	1993 Shanghai	
10,000 m walk (track)	45:00.32	Li Chunxiu	China	1993	1993 Shanghai	
