= Shōta Iizuka =

Japanese sprinter (born 1991)

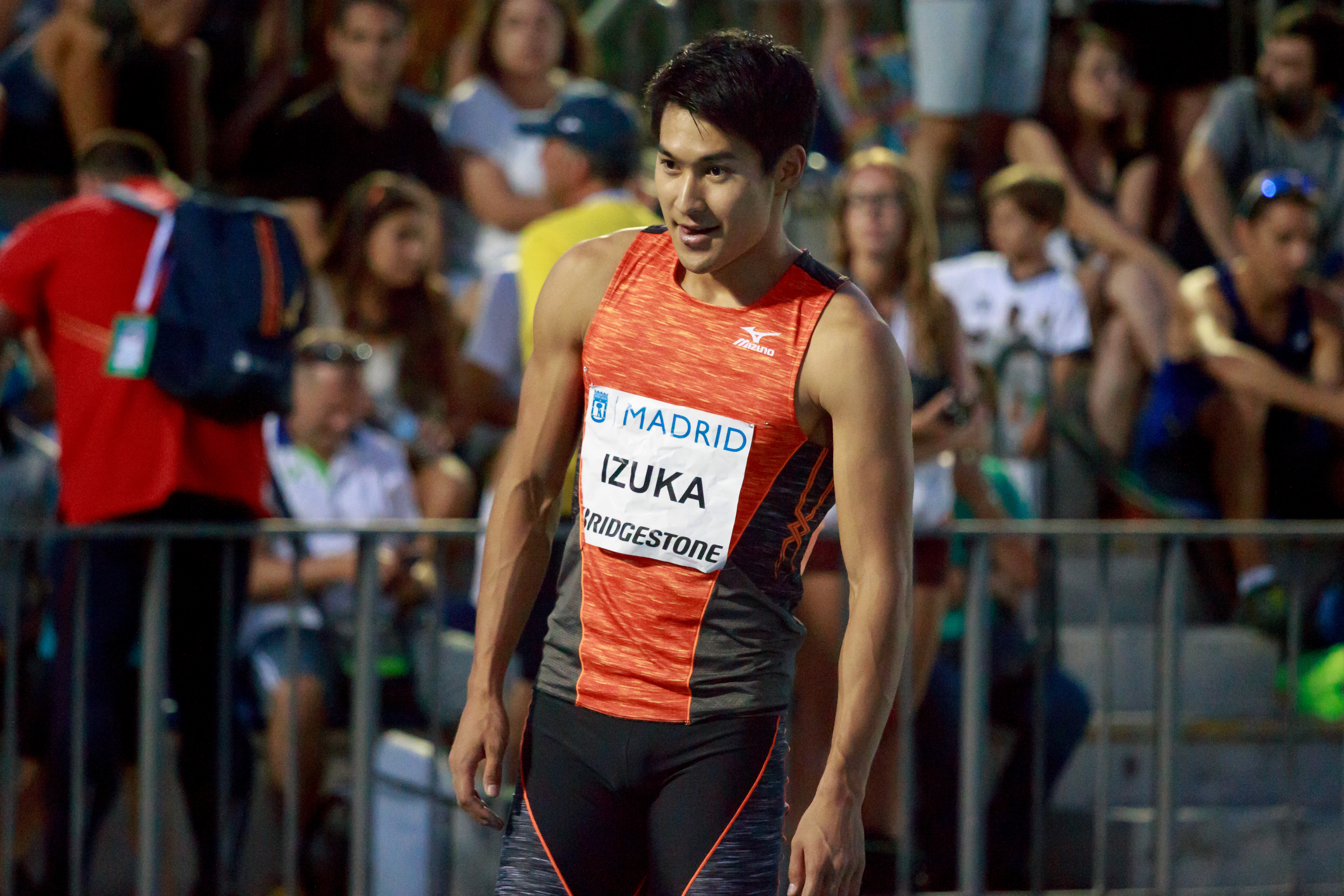
- Iizuka in 2017

Personal information
- Nationality: Japanese
- Born: 25 June 1991 (age 35) Omaezaki, Shizuoka
- Height: 1.85 m (6 ft 1 in)
- Weight: 80 kg (176 lb)

Sport
- Sport: Track and field
- Events: 100 metres, 200 metres
- University team: Chuo University
- Club: Mizuno Track Club
- Coached by: Katsumi Sakai

Achievements and titles
- Personal bests: 100 m: 10.08 s (2017); 200 m: 20.11 s (2016)
Medal record
Men's athletics
Representing Japan
Olympic Games
Silver medal – second place	2016 Rio de Janeiro	4×100 m relay
World Championships
Bronze medal – third place	2017 London	4×100 m relay
Summer Universiade
Silver medal – second place	2013 Kazan	4×100 m relay
Bronze medal – third place	2013 Kazan	200 m
Asian Games
Gold medal – first place	2014 Incheon	4×400 m relay
Silver medal – second place	2014 Incheon	4×100 m relay
Bronze medal – third place	2018 Jakarta-Palembang	4 × 400 m relay
East Asian Games
Gold medal – first place	2013 Tianjin	4×100 m relay
Silver medal – second place	2013 Tianjin	200 m
World Junior Championships
Gold medal – first place	2010 Moncton	200 m

Shōta Iizuka (飯塚 翔太, Iizuka Shōta; born 25 June 1991) is a Japanese sprinter who specializes in the 200 metres.

Iizuka started to compete in track and field after winning a local 100 metre competition when he was in third grade; the coach of a local club scouted his performance in this race and brought him to join his track and field club. He attended Fujieda Meisei High School and then Chuo University, where he studied law.

At the 2010 World Junior Championships in Athletics, Iizuka won the 200 metres title with a time of 20.67 seconds, making him the first Japanese male sprinter to win a medal in the event.

At the 2016 Summer Olympics, Iizuka won a silver medal in the 4 × 100 metres relay. He has won a total of eight medals (three gold, four silver, one bronze) in international athletics competitions.

Athletics Men's 200 Final - 27th Summer Universiade 2013 - Kazan (RUS) Iizuke takes 3rd

== Personal bests ==
Event	Time	Wind	Venue	Date	Notes
100 m	10.08 s	+1.9 m/s	Tottori, Japan	June 4, 2017	Japan's 9th-fastest time
200 m	20.11 s	+1.8 m/s	Nagoya, Japan	June 26, 2016	Japan's 2nd-fastest time

== Records ==
- 200 metres
  - Current Japanese university record holder – 20.21 s (wind: +1.4 m/s) (Fukuroi, May 3, 2013)
- 4 × 100 m relay
  - Current Asian and Japanese record holder – 37.60 s (relay leg: 2nd) (Rio de Janeiro, August 19, 2016)^{[a]}
  - Current Japanese university record holder – 38.44 s (relay leg:2nd) (Tianjin, October 9, 2013)^{[b]}

^{a} with Ryōta Yamagata, Yoshihide Kiryū, and Asuka Cambridge
^{b} with Ryōta Yamagata, Asuka Cambridge, and Kazuma Ōseto

== Competition record ==
Year	Competition	Venue	Position	Event	Notes
2010	World Junior Championships	Moncton, Canada	1st	200 m	20.67 (wind: +0.5 m/s)
2010	World Junior Championships	Moncton, Canada	4th	4 × 100 m relay	39.89 (relay leg: 4th)
2011	Asian Championships	Kobe, Japan	4th	200 m	21.10 (wind: -0.4 m/s)
2011	Universiade	Shenzhen, China	9th (sf)	200 m	21.02 (wind: -0.1 m/s)
2011	Universiade	Shenzhen, China	– (h)	4 × 100 m relay	DQ (relay leg: 4th)
2012	Olympic Games	London, United Kingdom	36th (h)	200 m	20.81 (wind: +1.1 m/s)
2012	Olympic Games	London, United Kingdom	4th	4 × 100 m relay	38.35 (relay leg: 4th)
2013	Universiade	Kazan, Russia	3rd	200 m	20.33 (wind: +2.4 m/s)
2013	Universiade	Kazan, Russia	2nd	4 × 100 m relay	39.12 (relay leg: 4th)
2013	World Championships	Moscow, Russia	18th (sf)	200 m	20.61 (wind: 0.0 m/s)
2013	World Championships	Moscow, Russia	6th	4 × 100 m relay	38.39 (relay leg: 4th)
2013	East Asian Games	Tianjin, China	2nd	200 m	21.01 (wind: -0.3 m/s)
2013	East Asian Games	Tianjin, China	1st	4 × 100 m relay	38.44 (relay leg: 2nd) GR, NUR
2014	World Relays	Nassau, Bahamas	5th	4 × 100 m relay	38.40 (relay leg: 4th)
2014	Asian Games	Incheon, South Korea	4th	200 m	20.87 (wind: +0.3 m/s)
2014	Asian Games	Incheon, South Korea	2nd	4 × 100 m relay	38.49 (relay leg: 2nd)
2014	Asian Games	Incheon, South Korea	1st	4 × 400 m relay	3:01.88 (relay leg: 3rd)
2016	Olympic Games	Rio de Janeiro, Brazil	30th (h)	200 m	20.49 (wind: +0.3 m/s)
2016	Olympic Games	Rio de Janeiro, Brazil	2nd	4 × 100 m relay	37.60 (relay leg: 2nd) AR
2017	World Championships	London, United Kingdom	16th (sf)	200 m	20.62 (wind: +2.1 m/s)
2017	World Championships	London, United Kingdom	3rd	4 × 100 m relay	38.04 (relay leg: 2nd)
2018	Asian Games	Jakarta, Indonesia	6th	200 m	20.68 (wind: +0.7 m/s)
2018	Asian Games	Jakarta, Indonesia	3rd	4 × 400 m relay	3:01.94 (relay leg: 4th)
2019	World Championships	Doha, Qatar	9th (h)	4 × 400 m relay	3:02.05 (relay leg: 2nd)
2021	Olympic Games	Tokyo, Japan	38th (h)	200 m	21.02
2022	World Championships	Eugene, United States	22nd (sf)	200 m	20.77
2023	World Championships	Budapest, Hungary	18th (sf)	200 m	20.54
2024	Olympic Games	Paris, France	13th (rep)	200 m	20.72
2025	Asian Championships	Gumi, South Korea	4th	200 m	20.66
2025	World Championships	Tokyo, Japan	36th (h)	200 m	20.64

=== National Championship ===
Year	Competition	Venue	Position	Event	Notes
2010	Japan Championships	Yokohama, Kanagawa	– (h)	4 × 100 m relay	DQ (relay leg: 4th)
2011	Japan Championships	Kumagaya, Saitama	4th	200 m	20.64 (wind: 0.0 m/s)
2011	Japan Championships	Yokohama, Kanagawa	1st	4 × 100 m relay	39.48 (relay leg: 2nd)
2011	Japan Championships	Yokohama, Kanagawa	1st	4 × 400 m relay	3:05.02 (relay leg: 2nd) GR
2012	Japan Championships	Osaka, Osaka	4th	100 m	10.36 (wind: 0.0 m/s)
2012	Japan Championships	Osaka, Osaka	2nd	200 m	20.45 (0.0 m/s)
2012	Japan Championships	Yokohama, Kanagawa	– (h)	4 × 100 m relay	DNF (relay leg: 4th)
2013	Japan Championships	Chōfu, Tokyo	1st	200 m	20.31 (wind: +0.9 m/s)
2014	Japan Championships	Fukushima, Fukushima	3rd	200 m	20.66 (wind: +0.9 m/s)
2015	Japan Championships	Niigata, Niigata	– (f)	200 m	DNF
2016	Japan Championships	Nagoya, Aichi	1st	200 m	20.11 (wind: +1.8 m/s) PB
2017	Japan Championships	Osaka, Osaka	3rd	200 m	20.55 (wind: +0.3 m/s)
