= Asuka Cambridge =

Japanese sprinter (born 1993)

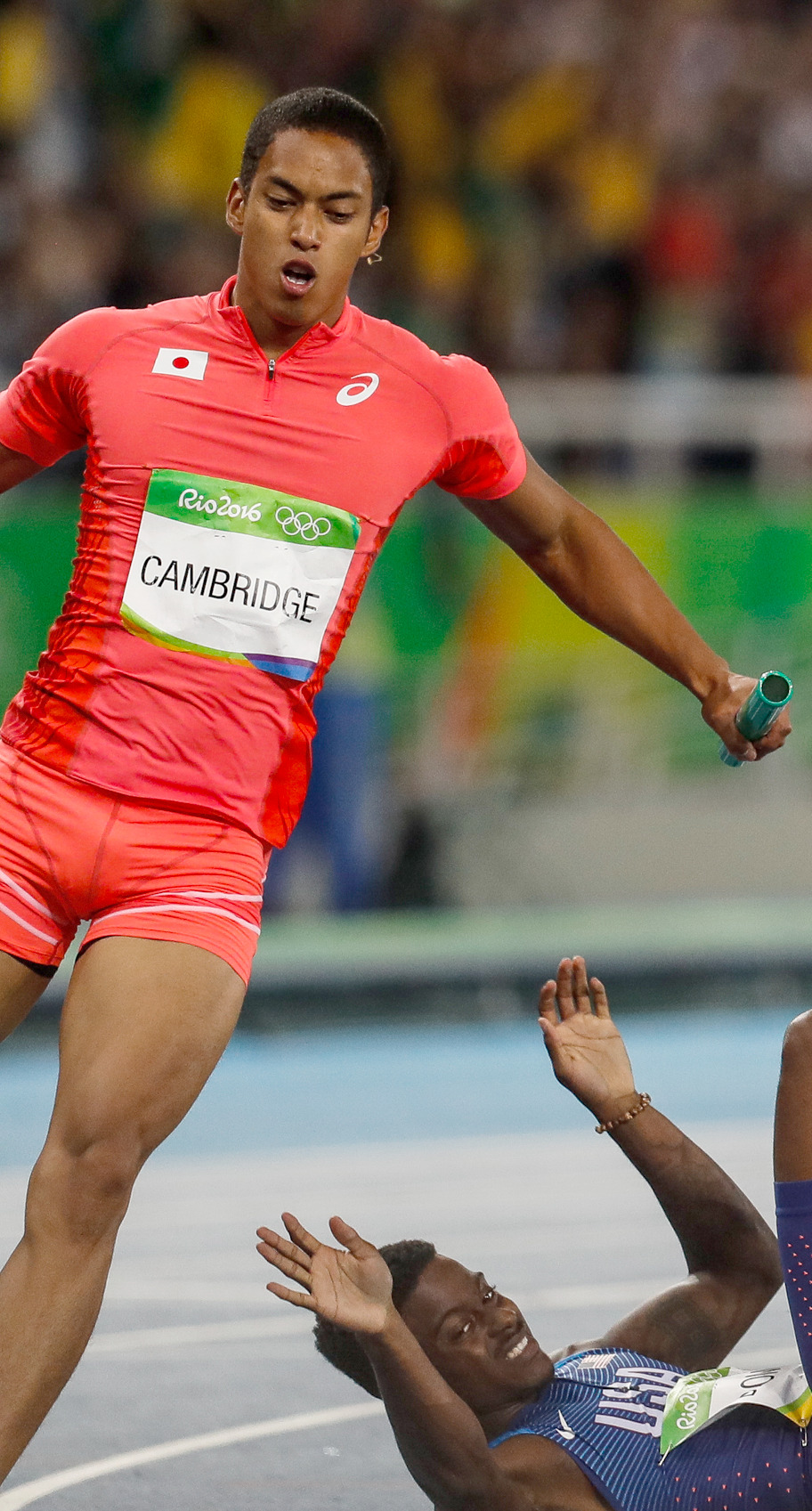
- Cambridge at the 2016 Olympics

Personal information
- Full name: Asuka Antonio Cambridge
- Nickname: Aska
- Born: 31 May 1993 (age 33) Spanish Town, Jamaica
- Height: 1.79 m (5 ft 10 in)
- Weight: 74 kg (163 lb)

Sport
- Country: Japan
- Sport: Athletics
- Event(s): 100 m, 200 m

Achievements and titles
- Personal best(s): 100 m – 10.03 (2020); 200 m – 20.62 (2013); 400 m – 52.19 (2009)
Medal record
Olympic Games
Silver medal – second place	2016 Rio de Janeiro	4×100 m relay
World Championships
Bronze medal – third place	2017 London	4×100 m relay
Asian Games
Gold medal – first place	2018 Jakarta-Palembang	4 × 100 m relay
East Asian Games
Gold medal – first place	2013 Tianjin	200 m
Gold medal – first place	2013 Tianjin	4×100 m relay
World Junior Championships
Bronze medal – third place	2012 Barcelona	4×100 m relay

Asuka Antonio "Aska" Cambridge (ケンブリッジ 飛鳥, Kenburijji Asuka; born 31 May 1993) is a Jamaican-born Japanese track and field sprinter who competes in the 100 metres and 200 metres. His personal best of 10.03 in the 100m gives him Japan's 6th fastest time. He is a two-time East Asian Games gold medallist and a relay bronze medallist at the World Junior Championships in Athletics. His mother is Japanese and his father is Jamaican.

In the 2016 Olympic Games in Rio de Janeiro, Cambridge was part of the 4 × 100 m relay for Japan, which took the silver medal in the final.

== Biography ==
Cambridge was born in Jamaica to a Japanese mother and a Jamaican father. His given name Asuka generally signifies "flying bird" in Japanese language and has also been a city name and period name in Ancient Japan (see Asuka period). When he was 2 years old, his family moved from Jamaica to Osaka, Japan. He played football until the age of twelve. When he was fourteen, he moved to Tokyo from Osaka. Cambridge then focused on athletics, running sprinting events for his high school in Tokyo and later at Nihon University, where he studied literature and science. He was fourth in the 100 m at the 2011 National Sports Festival of Japan. At the 2012 World Junior Championships in Athletics he narrowly missed out on the 200 m final, but he excelled in the relay alongside Kazuma Oseto, Akiyuki Hashimoto and Kazuki Kanamori – the team ran an Asian junior record of 39.01 seconds in the heats (the fastest of all the qualifiers) and were just one hundredth slower in the final, where they claimed the bronze medals.

In 2013, Cambridge improved his personal best to 10.33 seconds for the 100 m and 20.62 seconds for the 200 m. He won his first international gold medals at the 2013 East Asian Games by beating compatriot Shōta Iizuka in the 200 m and then teaming up with his rival to help secure the 4×100 metres relay title for Japan. Their time of 38.44 seconds was a new East Asian Games record – an improvement of nearly half a second.

On 25 June 2016, Cambridge won the 100 m final at the Japan Championships in 10.16 to qualify for the Rio Olympics.

On 19 August 2016, Cambridge won a silver medal in the 4 × 100 m relay for Japan at the 2016 Summer Olympics by setting a new Asian record of 37.60 seconds with teammates Ryōta Yamagata, Yoshihide Kiryū, and Shōta Iizuka.

On 29 August 2020, Cambridge won the 100m final with a new personal best of 10.03 at the Athlete Night Games in Fukui.

== Japan's top 10 records for men's 100m ==
Rank	Time (sec)	Wind (m/s)	Athlete	Team	Place	Date
1	9.97	+0.8	Abdul Hakim Sani Brown	NCAA Championships	Austin	7 June 2019
2	9.98	+1.8	Yoshihide Kiryu	Toyo University	Fukui	9 September 2017
3	10.00	+1.9	Koji Ito	Fujitsu	Bangkok	13 December 1998
3	10.00	+0.2	Ryota Yamagata	Seiko Holdings	Osaka	24 September 2017
3	10.00	+0.7	Ryota Yamagata	Japan	Jakarta	26 August 2018
5	10.02	+2.0	Nobuharu Asahara	Osaka Gas	Oslo	13 July 2001
6	10.03	+1.8	Shingo Suetsugu	Tokai University	Mito	5 May 2003
6	10.03	+1.0	Asuka Cambridge	Nike	Fukui	29 August 2020
8	10.07	+1.9	Masashi Eriguchi	Waseda University	Hiroshima	28 June 2009
8	10.07	+1.8	Shuhei Tada	Kwansei Gakuin University	Fukui	9 September 2017
10	10.08	+1.9	Shota Iizuka	Mizuno	Totori	4 June 2017
