= Athletics at the 2001 East Asian Games =

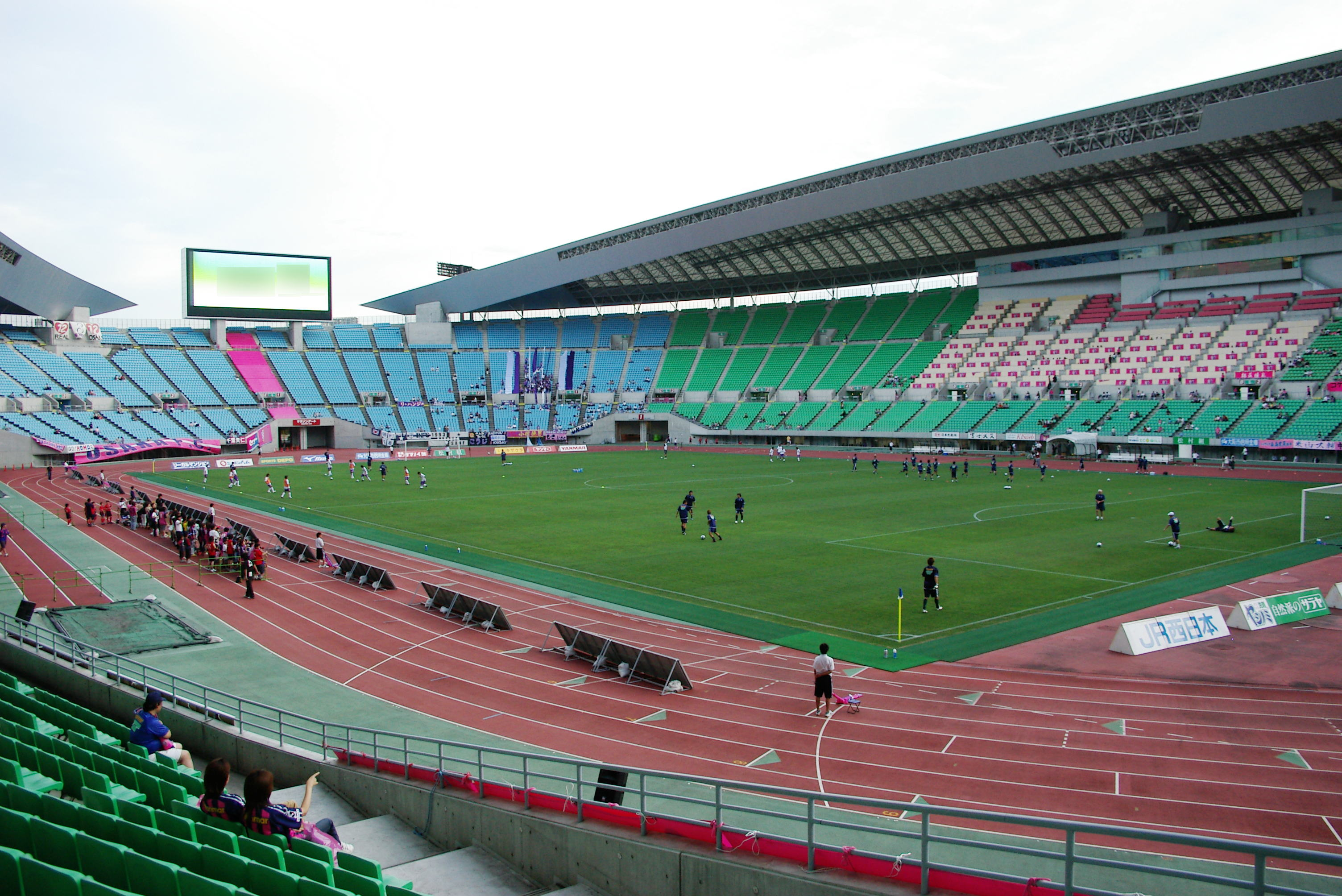
- The Nagai Stadium hosted most events
- Dates: 23 – 26 May
- Host city: Osaka, Japan
- Venue: Nagai Stadium
- Level: Senior
- Events: 45
- Participation: ? athletes from 9 (+1 guest) nations
- Records set: 20 Games records 3 Japanese records

At the 2001 East Asian Games, the athletics events were held in Osaka, Japan from 23 to 26 May 2001. A total of 45 events were contested, 23 by male and 22 by female athletes. All events were held at the Nagai Stadium, with the exception of the racewalking and half marathon events. A team of Australian athletes took part in the competition but they were excluded from the medal tally. This was the last time that Kazakhstan competed in the competition.

In the third edition of the multi-sport event, 20 Games records were made over the four-day athletics competition. China had the greatest gold medal haul with 27, largely due to the success of their women athletes, who won all but three of the 22 women's events. The hosts, Japan, won the most medals overall, winning 11 golds, 22 silvers and 51 medals in total. The women's events over 400 metres brought a number of Japanese records: Kazue Kakinuma broke the 400 m sprint record, Makiko Yoshida set a new record in the 400 metres hurdles, and the 4×400 metres relay team made a new national best of 3:33.06. Seventeen-year-old Liu Xiang set a new 110 metres hurdles record of 13.42 for the first gold medal of his career.

All the Games records in the relay races were broken, meaning that both Shingo Suetsugu (who broke the 200 metres record) and Bu Fanfang (who broke the 400 m record) made new Games records in multiple events. Some athletes took on two individual events in the competition schedule and doubled their medal hauls: Gennadiy Chernovol took 100 m gold and 200 m silver while his Kazakh compatriot Mihail Kolganov won gold in the 800 and 1500 m. Wu Wen-Chien did a bronze double in the 5000 m and steeplechase for Chinese Taipei, and Dong Yanmei won two golds in the 5000 and 10,000 m events. Kumiko Ikeda of Japan set personal bests in the long jump and 100 metres hurdles for a silver and bronze medal, respectively.

== Records ==
Name	Event	Country	Record	Type
Shingo Suetsugu	200 metres	Japan	20.34	GR
Liu Xiaomei	200 metres	China	22.87	GR
Xu Zizhou	400 metres	China	45.25	GR
Mihail Kolganov	800 metres	Kazakhstan	1:49.00	GR
Katsuhiko Hanada	10,000 metres	Japan	28:42.19	GR
Liu Xiang	110 metres hurdles	China	13.42	GR
Chen Tien-Wen	400 metres hurdles	Chinese Taipei	49.18	GR
Yasunori Uchitomi	3000 m steeplechase	Japan	8:33.98	GR
Shingo Kawabata; Akihiro Yasui; Shingo Suetsugu; Hideki Ishizuka	4×100 metres relay	Japan	38.93	GR
Mitsuhiro Sato; Jun Osakada; Dai Tamesue; Ryuji Muraki	4×400 metres relay	Japan	3:03.74	GR
Kazuo Ietani	Half marathon	Japan	1:04:49	GR
Koji Murofushi	Hammer throw	Japan	79.68	GR
Guan Yingnan	Long jump	China	6.61	GR
Liu Hongyu	20 km walk	China	1:32:06	GR
Li Rongxiang	Javelin throw	China	81.55	GR
Bu Fanfang	400 metres	China	52.31	GR
Dong Yanmei	5000 metres	China	15:32.71	GR
Feng Yun	100 metres hurdles	China	13.12	GR
Zeng Xiujun; Liu Xiaomei; Qin Wangping; Li Xuemei	4×100 metres relay	China	44.08	GR
Yan Jiankui; Li Yulian; Chen Yixiang; Bu Fanfang	4×400 metres relay	China	3:30.51	GR
Mizuki Noguchi	Half marathon	Japan	1:11:18	GR
Miki Imai	High jump	Japan	1.92	GR
Svetlana Kazanina	Heptathlon	Kazakhstan	6078	GR
Manabu Yokoyama	Pole vault	Japan	5.60	GR
Miho Sugimori; Kazue Kakinuma; Sakie Nobuoka; Makiko Yoshida	4×400 metre relay	Japan	3:33.06	NR
Makiko Yoshida	400 metres hurdles	Japan	57.33	NR
Kazue Kakinuma	400 metres	Japan	52.95	NR

Key:	WR — World record • AR — Asian record • GR — Games record • NR — National record

== Medal summary ==
=== Men ===
Event	Gold		Silver		Bronze	
100 metres	Gennadiy Chernovol (KAZ)	10.28	Chen Haijian (CHN)	10.31	Nobuharu Asahara (JPN)	10.44
200 metres	Shingo Suetsugu (JPN)	20.34 GR	Gennadiy Chernovol (KAZ)	20.55	Tsai Meng-Lin (TPE)	20.92
400 metres	Xu Zizhou (CHN)	45.25 GR	Jun Osakada (JPN)	45.47	Ryuji Muraki (JPN)	46.17
800 metres	Mihail Kolganov (KAZ)	1:49.00 GR	Lee Jae-Hun (KOR)	1:49.18	Hiroshi Sasano (JPN)	1:49.39
1500 metres †	Mihail Kolganov (KAZ)	3:46.43	Lee Duhaeng (KOR)	3:49.63	Junji Konomi (JPN)	3:51.13
5000 metres	Toshinari Takaoka (JPN)	13:56.23	Tomohiro Seto (JPN)	14:08.53	Wu Wen-Chien (TPE)	14:15.50
10,000 metres	Katsuhiko Hanada (JPN)	28:42.19 GR	Takeshi Hamano (JPN)	28:50.20	Cho Keun-Hyung (KOR)	29:33.23
110 metre hurdles	Liu Xiang (CHN)	13.42 GR	Chen Yanhao (CHN)	13.47	Satoru Tanigawa (JPN)	13.98
400 metre hurdles	Chen Tien-Wen (TPE)	49.18 GR	Dai Tamesue (JPN)	49.28	Tan Chunhua (CHN)	49.42
3000 metre steeplechase	Yasunori Uchitomi (JPN)	8:33.98 GR	Wataru Izumi (JPN)	8:36.48	Wu Wen-Chien (TPE)	8:44.15
4×100 metre relay	Japan (JPN); Shingo Kawabata; Akihiro Yasui; Shingo Suetsugu; Hideki Ishizuka	38.93 GR	China (CHN)	39.29	Hong Kong (HKG)	40.13
4×400 metre relay	Japan (JPN); Mitsuhiro Sato; Jun Osakada; Dai Tamesue; Ryuji Muraki	3:03.74 GR	No other medalling team		No other medalling team	
Half marathon	Kazuo Ietani (JPN)	1:04:49 GR	Lee Eui-Soo (KOR)	1:08:24	Chai Jiahua (CHN)	1:09:47
20 km walk	Li Zewen (CHN)	1:24:10	Satoshi Yanagisawa (JPN)	1:24:26	Sergey Korepanov (KAZ)	1:24:41
High jump	Lee Jin-Taek (KOR)	2.23	Takahisa Yoshida (JPN)	2.20	Yuriy Pakhlyayev (KAZ); Wang Zhouzhou (CHN)	2.15
Pole vault	Manabu Yokoyama (JPN)	5.60 GR	Xu Gang (CHN)	5.20	Satoru Yasuda (JPN)	5.20
Long jump	Wang Cheng (CHN)	8.07	Masaki Morinaga (JPN)	8.02	Huang Le (CHN)	7.77
Triple jump	Gu Junjie (CHN)	16.56	Takanori Sugibayashi (JPN)	16.45	Sergey Arzamasov (KAZ)	16.13
Shot put	Liu Hao (CHN)	18.70	Wen Jili (CHN)	18.50	Kim Jae-Il (KOR)	17.43
Discus throw	Li Shaojie (CHN)	60.08	Chang Ming-Huang (TPE)	55.88	Dashdendev Makhashiri (MGL)	55.74
Hammer throw	Koji Murofushi (JPN)	79.68 GR	Ye Kuigang (CHN)	72.17	Wataru Ebihara (JPN)	68.55
Javelin throw	Li Rongxiang (CHN)	81.55 GR	Yukifumi Murakami (JPN)	76.36	Park Jae-Myong (KOR)	71.44
Decathlon	Dmitriy Karpov (KAZ)	7567	Ivan Yarkin (KAZ)	7536	Hitoshi Maruono (JPN)	7416

=== Women ===
Event	Gold		Silver		Bronze	
100 metres	Zeng Xiujun (CHN)	11.48	Li Xuemei (CHN)	11.58	Viktoriya Koviyreva (KAZ)	11.71
200 metres	Liu Xiaomei (CHN)	22.87 GR	Yan Jiankui (CHN)	23.39	Motoko Arai (JPN)	23.69
400 metres	Bu Fanfang (CHN)	52.31 GR	Svetlana Bodritskaya (KAZ)	52.39	Kazue Kakinuma (JPN)	52.95 NR
800 metres	Wang Yuanping (CHN)	2:03.21	Miki Nishimura (JPN)	2:03.43	Reina Sasaki (JPN)	2:08.98
1500 metres	Li Jingnan (CHN)	4:12.13	Ikuko Tamura (JPN)	4:16.09	Lan Lixin (CHN)	4:21.81
5000 metres	Dong Yanmei (CHN)	15:32.71 GR	Li Ji (CHN)	15:44.51	Mari Ozaki (JPN)	15:47.02
10,000 metres	Dong Yanmei (CHN)	32:30.35	Ikumi Nagayama (JPN)	32:36.15	Yoshiko Fujinaga (JPN)	32:47.21
100 metre hurdles	Feng Yun (CHN)	13.12 GR	Su Yiping (CHN)	13.33	Kumiko Ikeda (JPN)	13.48 PB
400 metre hurdles †	Li Yulian (CHN)	56.43	Song Yinglan (CHN)	56.94	Makiko Yoshida (JPN)	57.33 NR
4×100 metre relay	China (CHN); Zeng Xiujun; Liu Xiaomei; Qin Wangping; Li Xuemei	44.08 GR	Japan (JPN)	44.24	Only two starters	
4×400 metre relay	China (CHN); Yan Jiankui; Li Yulian; Chen Yuxiang; Bu Fanfang	3:30.51 GR	Japan (JPN); Miho Sugimori; Kazue Kakinuma; Sakie Nobuoka; Makiko Yoshida	3:33.06 NR	South Korea (KOR)	3:50.89
Half marathon	Mizuki Noguchi (JPN)	1:11:18 GR	Takako Kotorida (JPN)	1:13:31	Wei Yanan (CHN)	1:13:53
20 km walk	Liu Hongyu (CHN)	1:32:06 GR	Maya Sazonova (KAZ)	1:32:31	Wang Yan (CHN)	1:35:36
High jump	Miki Imai (JPN)	1.92 GR	Svetlana Zalevskaya (KAZ)	1.90	Lu Jieming (CHN)	1.80
Pole vault	Gao Shuying (CHN)	4.20	Takayo Kondo (JPN)	4.05	Zhang Na (CHN)	4.05
Long jump	Guan Yingnan (CHN)	6.61 GR	Kumiko Ikeda (JPN)	6.52 PB	Maho Hanaoka (JPN)	6.38 w
Triple jump	Ren Ruiping (CHN)	13.80	Maho Hanaoka (JPN)	13.51	Yelena Parfenova (KAZ)	13.20
Shot put	Cheng Xiaoyan (CHN)	18.47	Lee Myung-Sun (KOR)	18.07	Iolanta Ulyeva (KAZ)	16.92
Discus throw	Li Qiumei (CHN)	60.99	Miyoko Nakanishi (JPN)	55.28	Yuka Murofushi (JPN)	50.87
Hammer throw †	Zhao Wei (CHN)	63.98	Liu Yinghui (CHN)	63.12	Masumi Aya (JPN)	60.27
Javelin throw	Wei Jianhua (CHN)	61.10	Takako Miyake (JPN)	56.61	Zhang Li (CHN)	55.13
Heptathlon	Svetlana Kazanina (KAZ)	6078 GR	Sayoko Sato (JPN)	5597	Only two finishers	

- Events marked † were won by Australian guest athletes:
  - Men's 1500 m – Clinton Mackevicius in 3:44.87
  - Women's 400 m hurdles – Sonia Brito with 56.17
  - Women's hammer – Bronwyn Eagles with 67.08 m

== Medal table ==
* Host nation (Japan)

Rank	Nation	Gold	Silver	Bronze	Total
1	China	27	12	10	49
2	Japan*	11	22	18	51
3	Kazakhstan	5	5	6	16
4	South Korea	1	4	4	9
5	Chinese Taipei	1	1	3	5
6	Hong Kong	0	0	1	1
6	Mongolia	0	0	1	1
Totals (7 entries)		45	44	43	132
