= Zhao Qinggang =

Chinese javelin thrower (born 1985)

Personal information
- Born: 24 July 1985 (age 40) Dalian, Liaoning Province, China

Sport
- Country: China
- Sport: Track and field
- Event: Javelin throw

Achievements and titles
- Personal bests: NR 89.15 m (2014)
Medal record
East Asian Games
Gold medal – first place	2013 Tianjin	Javelin throw
Silver medal – second place	2009 Hong Kong	Javelin throw
Asian Games
Gold medal – first place	2014 Incheon	Javelin throw

Zhao Qinggang (Chinese: 赵庆刚; pinyin: Zhào Qìnggāng; born 24 July 1985) is a Chinese track and field athlete who competes in the javelin throw. His 89.15 m personal best throw, set in 2014, is the Chinese record. It was also the Asian record until surpassed in 2017. He represented his country at the 2013 World Championships in Athletics. He is the 2014 Asian Games champion. At the East Asian Games, he was the runner-up in 2009 and the winner in 2013. He is a two-time Chinese champion (2012 and 2013) and was the winner of the 2013 National Games of China.

== Career ==
He began competing at the national level in 2006 and threw over seventy metres for the first time in 2007. He established himself among China's best throwers the following year, having a personal best of 77.20 m at the Good Luck Beijing Olympic test event. He placed second at the Olympic trials and third at the Chinese Athletics Championships. He did not achieve the qualifying standard for the 2008 Beijing Olympics, and Chen Qi (the reigning Asian champion) was China's sole representative in the men's javelin. He continued to improve in the 2009 season, placing second at both the Chinese Championships and the 11th Chinese National Games. He ended the season with a personal best of 79.62 metres at the 2009 East Asian Games, which brought him the silver medal behind fellow Chinese Qin Qiang.

In May 2010, he edged closer to eighty metres with a best of 79.80 m to win the Kunshan leg of the Chinese Athletics Grand Prix. He made his first IAAF Diamond League appearance, coming sixth at the Shanghai Golden Grand Prix meet, but missed the podium at the Chinese Championships, coming fourth. His 2011 was low-key, with a throw of 78.40 m at the Kawasaki Super Meet in Japan being the sole highlight. Improvements followed in 2012, however, with a personal best to win the Chinese Universities title, followed by his first national title at the Chinese Championships with a best of 81.74 m (making him the sixth Chinese ever over that mark).

He threw over eighty metres several times in 2013. He opened in Australia with a win at the Briggs Athletics Classic and runner-up placings at the Perth and Melbourne Track Classic. While there, he trained with former world record holder Uwe Hohn. He threw 81.18 m at the Shanghai Diamond League meet, then won a second national title. This earned him a debut at the 2013 World Championships in Athletics, though he did not breach the 80-metre mark then and failed to make the final. Success came after this disappointment as he won at the 12th Chinese Games with a mark of 83.14 m, moving up to third on the all-time Chinese lists. He won his first international gold medal at the 2013 East Asian Games, where his winning mark of 82.97 m was a new Games record for the event.

== Seasonal bests by year ==
- 2008 – 77.20
- 2009 – 79.62
- 2010 – 79.80
- 2011 – 78.40
- 2012 – 81.74
- 2013 – 83.14
- 2014 – 89.15
- 2015 – 79.47
- 2016 – 80.42
- 2017 – 80.04
- 2018 – 62.88
- 2019 – 83.84
