= Athletics at the 2013 East Asian Games =

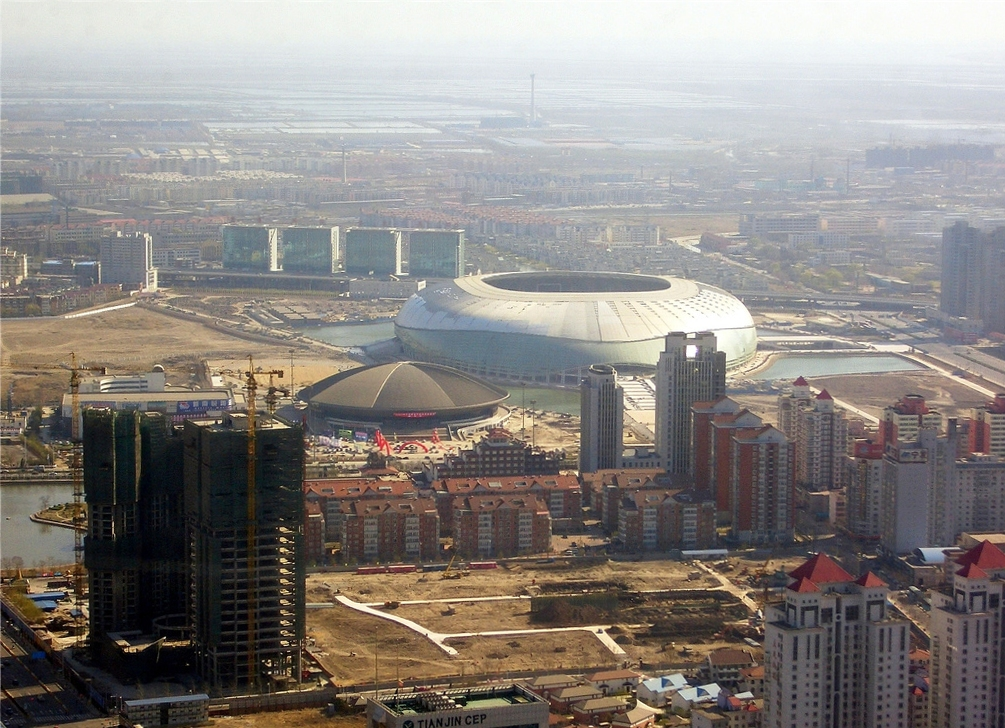
- Host stadium in Tianjin.
- Dates: 7 – 9 October
- Host city: Tianjin, China
- Venue: Tianjin Olympic Center Stadium
- Events: 29
- Participation: 9 nations

The athletics events at the 2013 East Asian Games were held in Tianjin, China from 7 to 9 October.

Four Games records were broken at the competition.

== Medal summary ==
=== Men ===
Event	Gold		Silver		Bronze	
100 metres	Su Bingtian (CHN)	10.31	Ryota Yamagata (JPN)	10.31	Kazuma Oseto (JPN)	10.48
200 metres	Asuka Cambridge (JPN)	20.93	Shōta Iizuka (JPN)	21.01	Cho Kyu-Won (KOR)	21.57
400 metres	Lim Chan-Ho (KOR)	46.58	Chen Jianxin (CHN)	46.63	Naoki Kobayashi (JPN)	46.76
800 metres	Sho Kawamoto (JPN)	1:53.18	Teng Haining (CHN)	1:53.52	Choi Hyeon-Gi (KOR)	1:54.56
1500 metres	Zhang Haikun (CHN)	3:52.85	Shin Sang-Min (KOR)	3:53.34	Munkhbayar Narandulam (MGL)	3:54.10
5000 metres	Sota Hoshi (JPN)	14:25.00	Ser-Od Bat-Ochir (MGL)	14:28.24	Yu Seung-Yeop (KOR)	14:30.57
110 metres hurdles	Jiang Fan (CHN)	13.58	Kim Byung-Jun (KOR)	13.61	Ji Wei (CHN)	13.70
400 metres hurdles	Cheng Wen (CHN)	49.66	Chen Chieh (TPE)	49.90	Keisuke Nozawa (JPN)	50.61
4×100 m relay	Japan (JPN); Ryota Yamagata; Shōta Iizuka; Asuka Cambridge; Kazuma Oseto	38.44 GR	Hong Kong (HKG); Tang Yik Chun; Lai Chun Ho; Ng Ka Fung; Tsui Chi Ho	39.12	China (CHN); Zhang Peimeng; Zheng Dongsheng; Su Bingtian; Liang Jiahong	39.19
4×400 m relay	China (CHN); Cui Haojing; Chang Pengben; Zhang Yunpeng; Chen Jianxin	3:07.27	Japan (JPN); Kengo Yamazaki; Naoki Kobayashi; Sho Kawamoto; Keisuke Nozawa	3:07.32	Chinese Taipei (TPE); Chen Yu-Teh; Wang Wen-Tang; Lo Yen-Yao; Chen Chieh	3:10.72
Pole vault	Seito Yamamoto (JPN)	5.50 m	Zhou Bo (CHN)	5.30 m	Hiroki Ogita (JPN)	5.30 m
Long jump	Kim Sang-Su (KOR)	7.71 m	Yun Zhiming (CHN)	7.69 m	Yuhi Oiwa (JPN)	7.64 m
Triple jump	Fu Haitao (CHN)	16.21 m	Cao Shuo (CHN)	16.15 m	Tsai Yi-Da (TPE)	15.16 m
Shot put	Wang Guangfu (CHN)	19.34 m	Wang Like (CHN)	19.21 m	Chang Ming-huang (TPE)	19.19 m
Hammer throw	Wan Yong (CHN)	69.26 m	Lee Yun-Chul (KOR)	67.65 m	Qi Dakai (CHN)	67.01 m
Javelin throw	Zhao Qinggang (CHN)	82.97 m GR	Huang Shih-Feng (TPE)	82.11 m NR	Genki Dean (JPN)	77.35 m

=== Women ===
Event	Gold		Silver		Bronze	
100 metres	Wei Yongli (CHN)	11.57	Tao Yujia (CHN)	11.72	Akane Kimura (JPN)	11.99
200 metres	Wei Yongli (CHN)	23.71	Yuan Qiqi (CHN)	24.15	Kim Min-Ji (KOR)	24.25
400 metres	Chen Jingwen (CHN)	53.76	Tang Xiaoyin (CHN)	54.31	Saki Torihara (JPN)	54.92
800 metres	Song Tingting (CHN)	2:08.89	Miho Ito (JPN)	2:11.07	Khishigsaikhan Galbadrakh (MGL)	2:16.28
1500 metres	Zhao Jing (CHN)	4:17.87	Liu Fang (CHN)	4:19.40	Chikako Mori (JPN)	4:20.04
5000 metres	Riko Matsuzaki (JPN)	16:09.72	Kim Chun Mi (PRK)	16:35.79	Fu Tinglian (CHN)	16:40.52
10,000 metres	Yuko Shimizu (JPN)	32:50.42	Jiang Xiaoli (CHN)	34:04.57	Kim Chun Mi (PRK)	34:17.29
100 metres hurdles	Wu Shuijiao (CHN)	12.93 GR	Eriko Soma (JPN)	13.22	Jung Hye-Lim (KOR)	13.41
400 metres hurdles	Xiao Xia (CHN)	56.97	Sayaka Aoki (JPN)	58.06	Jo Eun-Ju (KOR)	58.44
3000 metres steeplechase	Li Zhenzhu (CHN)	9:53.17 GR	Misaki Sango (JPN)	9:54.02	Pak Kum Hyang (PRK)	10:04.83 NR
4×100 m relay	China (CHN); Tao Yujia; Wei Yongli; Lin Huijun; Yuan Qiqi	43.66	Japan (JPN); Anna Doi; Akane Kimura; Kana Ichikawa; Yuki Tamura	45.17	Chinese Taipei (TPE); Syu Yong-Jie; Huang Yu-Ching; Ko Ching-Ting; Shen Wan-Zhen	45.61
4×400 m relay	China (CHN); Zhou Yanling; Chen Yanmei; Tang Xiaoyin; Chen Jingwen	3:35.65	Japan (JPN); Sayaka Aoki; Saki Torihara; Haruka Shibata; Miho Shingu	3:40.55	Hong Kong (HKG); Lui Lai Yiu; Chan Sin Hung; Christy Ho Yan Lam; Poon Hang Wai	4:00.05
Shot put	Liu Xiangrong (CHN)	18.40 m	Lin Chia-ying (TPE)	16.95 m	Meng Qianqian (CHN)	16.92 m

== Medal table ==
* Host nation (China)

Rank	Nation	Gold	Silver	Bronze	Total
1	China*	20	11	5	36
2	Japan	7	9	9	25
3	South Korea	2	3	6	11
4	Chinese Taipei	0	3	4	7
5	Mongolia	0	1	2	3
5	North Korea	0	1	2	3
7	Hong Kong	0	1	1	2
Totals (7 entries)		29	29	29	87
