= Bolade Ajomale =

Canadian sprinter (b. 1995)

Personal information
- Full name: Mobolade Abimbola Ajomale
- Born: 31 August 1995 (age 31) London, England, United Kingdom
- Education: Academy of Art University
- Height: 1.80 m (5 ft 11 in)
- Weight: 67 kg (148 lb)

Sport
- Sport: Athletics
- Events: 60 m, 100 m, 200 m

Achievements and titles
- Personal bests: 60m: 6.57s, Pittsburgh, 2016; 100m: 10.15s, Edmonton, 2016; 200m: 20.45s, Charlotte, 2018
Medal record
Olympic Games
Bronze medal – third place	2016 Rio de Janeiro	4 x 100m relay

Mobolade Abimbola Ajomale (born 31 August 1995) is a Canadian sprinter. He competed in the 60 metres event at the 2016 IAAF World Indoor Championships. He won a bronze medal as part Canada's 2016 Olympic team in the 4 x 100 m relay.

Ajomale was part of the 4 x 100 m relay team, they finished third in their heats. In the final the team came agonizingly close to a medal and replaced Ajomale with Andre de Grasse. The team was just 0.02 seconds behind the third place United States team. However, the USA team was later disqualified for an improper baton pass, handing the bronze to Canada and Brown who ran the final as a team with anchor De Grasse, Brendon Rodney, Akeem Haynes, and Aaron Brown.

In August 2017, Ajomale competed in the 2017 World Championships in Athletics representing Canada in the 4 x 100 metres relay. Missing their anchor Andre De Grasse, the Canadian relay team ultimately placed sixth in the finals.

== Competition record ==
Year	Competition	Venue	Position	Event	Notes
Representing Canada
2012	World Junior Championships	Barcelona, Spain	17th (sf)	100 m	10.56
2012	World Junior Championships	Barcelona, Spain	15th (h)	4 × 100 m relay	40.58
2014	World Junior Championships	Eugene, United States	43rd (h)	200 m	21.60
2014	World Junior Championships	Eugene, United States	–	4 × 100 m relay	DQ
2015	Universiade	Gwangju, South Korea	12th (sf)	100 m	10.43
2015	Universiade	Gwangju, South Korea	11th (sf)	200 m	21.27
2015	Universiade	Gwangju, South Korea	10th (h)	4 × 100 m relay	40.30
2016	World Indoor Championships	Portland, United States	10th (sf)	60 m	6.60
2016	Olympic Games	Rio de Janeiro, Brazil	3rd (h)	4 × 100 m relay	37.89
2017	World Championships	London, United Kingdom	6th	4 × 100 m relay	38.59
2018	NACAC Championships	Toronto, Canada	1st	4 × 100 m relay	38.57
2019	Pan American Games	Lima, Peru	16th (h)	100 m	10.54
2019	Pan American Games	Lima, Peru	4th	4 × 100 m relay	39.00
2022	World Indoor Championships	Belgrade, Serbia	7th	60 m	6.63
2023	World Championships	Budapest, Hungary	10th (h)	4 × 100 m relay	38.25

== Personal bests ==
Outdoor

- 100 metres – 10.15 (+0.7 m/s, Edmonton 2016)
- 200 metres – 20.45 (-0.9 m/s, Charlotte 2018)
- 400 meters - 47.30(Oxy 2017)

Indoor

- 60 metres – 6.57 (Pittsburg 2016)
- 200 metres – 20.82 (Pittsburg 2016)
- 400 meters - 47.22 (Seattle 2017)
