= Kengo Yamazaki =

Japanese sprinter (born 1992)

Kengo Yamasaki
Personal information
- Nationality: Japanese
- Born: 30 July 1992 (age 33) Ibaraki Prefecture, Japan
- Education: Nihon University
- Height: 1.76 m (5 ft 9 in)
- Weight: 68 kg (150 lb)

Sport
- Country: Japan
- Sport: Track and field
- Event: 400 metres
- Retired: 2018

Achievements and titles
- Personal best: 400 m: 46.00 (2013)
Medal record
Men's athletics
Representing Japan
East Asian Games
Silver medal – second place	2013 Tianjin	4×400 m relay
Asian Junior Championships
Silver medal – second place	2010 Hanoi	4×400 m relay

Kengo Yamazaki (山﨑 謙吾, Yamazaki Kengo; born 30 July 1992 in Ibaraki Prefecture) is a Japanese retired track and field sprinter who specialized in the 400 metres. His personal best in the event was 46.00 seconds set in Tokyo in 2013. He competed in the 4 × 400 metres relay at the 2013 World Championships.

== Personal best ==
Event	Time (s)	Competition	Venue	Date
400 m	46.00	Japanese Championships	Chōfu, Japan	8 June 2013

== International competition ==
Year	Competition	Venue	Position	Event	Time	Notes
Representing Japan
2010	Asian Junior Championships	Hanoi, Vietnam	5th	400 m	48.55	
2010	Asian Junior Championships	Hanoi, Vietnam	2nd	4×400 m relay	3:12.14 (relay leg: 4th)	
2013	Universiade	Kazan, Russia	13th (sf)	400 m	46.90	
2013	Universiade	Kazan, Russia	5th	4×400 m relay	3:06.58 (relay leg: 4th)	
2013	World Championships	Moscow, Russia	9th (h)	4×400 m relay	3:02.43 (relay leg: 1st)	SB
2013	East Asian Games	Tianjin, China	4th	400 m	47.40	
2013	East Asian Games	Tianjin, China	2nd	4×400 m relay	3:07.32 (relay leg: 1st)	
2014	World Indoor Championships	Sopot, Poland	10th (h)	4×400 m relay	3:12.63 (relay leg: 1st)	SB

== National titles ==
Year	Competition	Venue	Event	Time
Representing Saitama Sakae High School and Ibaraki (National Sports Festival only)
2009	National High School Championships	Nara, Nara	400 m	46.83
2009	National High School Championships	Nara, Nara	4×400 m relay	3:12.38 (relay leg: 4th)
2009	National Sports Festival	Niigata, Niigata	400 m (U19)	46.94
2009	National Junior Championships	Kōfu, Yamanashi	400 m	46.98
2010	National High School Championships	Okinawa, Okinawa	400 m	47.79
2010	National Junior Championships	Nagoya, Aichi	400 m	47.63
Representing Nihon University
2013	National University Championships	Shinjuku, Tokyo	400 m	46.65
