= Katsuhiko Hanada =

Japanese long-distance runner

Katsuhiko Hanada (Japanese: 花田 勝彦; born 12 June 1971 in Kyoto) is a retired Japanese athlete who competed in the long-distance events. He represented his country at two Summer Olympics, in 1996 and 2000.

== Competition record ==
Year	Competition	Venue	Position	Event	Notes
Representing Japan
1996	Olympic Games	Atlanta, United States	27th (h)	10,000 m	28:52.22
1996	World Half Marathon Championships	Palma de Mallorca, Spain	14th	Half marathon	1:03:31
1997	World Championships	Athens, Greece	34th	Marathon	2:25:00
1998	World Half Marathon Championships	Uster, Switzerland	64th	Half marathon	1:04:53
2000	Olympic Games	Sydney, Australia	23rd (h)	5000 m	13:41.31
2000	Olympic Games	Sydney, Australia	15th	10,000 m	28:08.11
2001	East Asian Games	Osaka, Japan	1st	10,000 m	28:42.19

== Personal bests ==
- 5000 metres – 13:23.49 (Maia 1999)
- 10,000 metres – 27:45.13 (Sydney 2000)
- Half marathon – 1:01:38 (Tokyo 1998)
- Marathon – 2:10:02 (1997)
