= Athletics at the 2016 Summer Olympics – Men's 4 × 100 metres relay =

Men's 4 × 100 metres relay at the Games of the XXXI Olympiad
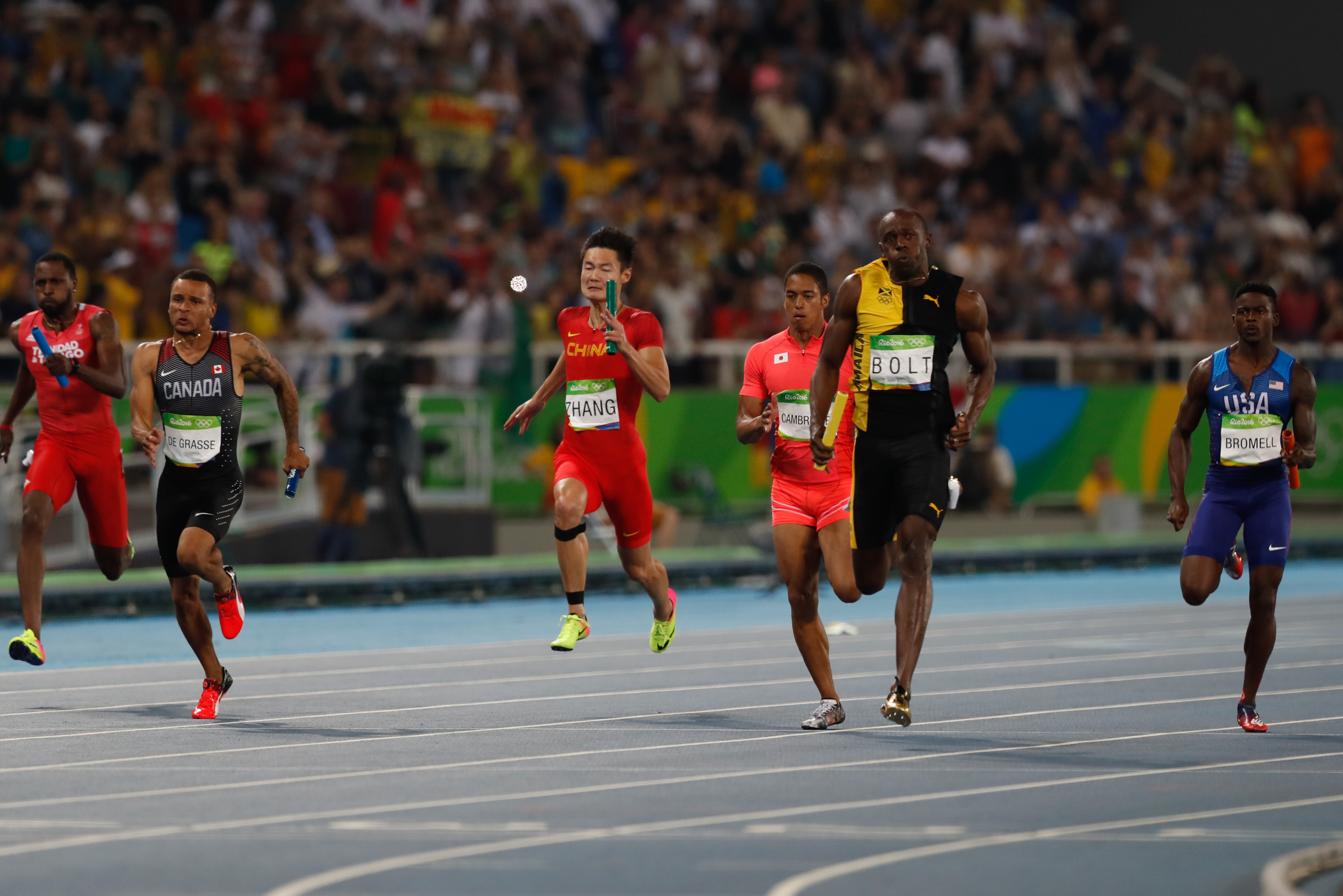
- Usain Bolt (JAM) leading during the final leg of the men's 4 × 100 metres relay
- Venue: Estádio Olímpico Nilton Santos
- Date: 18–19 August 2016
- Teams: 16
- Winning time: 37.27

Medalists
1st place, gold medalist(s)		Asafa Powell; Yohan Blake; Nickel Ashmeade; Usain Bolt; Kemar Bailey-Cole*; Jevaughn Minzie*	Jamaica
2nd place, silver medalist(s)		Ryota Yamagata; Shōta Iizuka; Yoshihide Kiryū; Asuka Cambridge	Japan
3rd place, bronze medalist(s)		Akeem Haynes; Aaron Brown; Brendon Rodney; Andre De Grasse; Bolade Ajomale* * Indicates the sprinter only competed in the preliminary heats.	Canada

The men's 4 × 100 metres relay competition at the 2016 Summer Olympics in Rio de Janeiro, Brazil was held at the Estádio Olímpico Nilton Santos on 18–19 August.

== Summary ==
Jamaica entered as the reigning 2015 World Champions and the defending Olympic champions, having set new world and Olympic records at the 2012 London Olympics. The United States were the next strongest team. The 2016 world leading time prior to the event was held by Great Britain, at 37.78 seconds. Other strong entrants were 2012 Olympic silver medallists Trinidad and Tobago and France, who earned bronze, and the 2015 world runners-up, China.

For the third Olympics in a row Usain Bolt had won the 100 metres and 200 metres. In the previous two Olympics the Jamaican team with Bolt had won the gold in the relay. Jamaica with Bolt; his predecessor as world record holder Asafa Powell; and the equal second fastest man in history, Yohan Blake, were favourites. Powell had been on the 2008 winning team, Blake had been on the 2012 winning team. USA were expected to be the strongest opposition with the Olympic 100m silver medalist Gatlin; Tyson Gay tied for second fastest in history; and the World Indoor Champion Trayvon Bromell.

The Asian 4 × 100 m record was improved three times at the 2016 games. The record before the Olympics was 37.92, run by China at the 2015 World Championships in Beijing. In the first semi final, with a new lead off leg, China improved the record to 37.82. Japan improved the record twice, to 37.68 in the second semi final and a new record of 37.60 in the final.

In the heats, Jamaica, USA and Canada rested their stars, while Japan and China did not. USA had the fastest qualifying time winning heat 1 ahead of China, Japan the second best time winning heat 2. Jamaica squeaked through to second place in their heat giving those four teams the preferred center lanes on the track, while Canada's third place relegated them to an outer lane.

The final began with USA in lane 3 and Jamaica in lane 4, with the USA's Mike Rodgers vs Powell. In the first leg the leaders were Jamaica, USA and Japan with lead off runner Ryota Yamagata. At the first handoff, both USA and Jamaica ran up on their outgoing runners, Gatlin and Blake, to their outside, Japan's exchange went smoother, gaining more than a meter. At the second handoff, things went smoother for all the teams as Jamaica, USA and Japan looked about even, with Nickel Ashmeade, Gay and youth world record holder Yoshihide Kiryū for the three leaders. Through the turn Kiryū appeared to gain against both Jamaica and USA. China were next, with Canada, Great Britain and Trinidad and Tobago further back. After the final baton change, the world junior record holder, Bromell, against world record holder Bolt, and Asuka Cambridge, a half-Jamaican Japanese runner, Bolt seemed to gain an edge on both Japan and USA, but had to slow as he fumbled to grab the baton. Leaving the zone Bolt only had inches on the other two leaders. Down the straightaway, Bolt pulled away to lead by two metres and Cambridge held a smaller lead over Bromell which Bromell could not close. Jamaica had a clear win, with Japan clearly second and USA third with Bromell falling at the finish line. The Andre De Grasse-anchored Canadian team finished fourth which became significant. Almost fifteen minutes after the race, after USA had joined Jamaica and Japan in their victory lap, the USA team were disqualified for exchanging outside the designated zone in the first baton change. Replays showed the baton change began before Rodgers and Gatlin had entered the exchange zone. Gatlin's late start resulted in Rodgers reaching Gatlin too early. The disqualification meant that Canada was elevated to the bronze medal, which was in stark contrast to four years ago when the Canadians, believing they had successfully secured the bronze medal when the race ended, were disqualified for a lane infringement.

Jamaica won the gold for a third consecutive time, and Usain Bolt won his 9th track and field gold medal. This also gave him the distinction of being the first man in history to complete the Triple-Triple (winning the 100 metres, 200 metres and 4 × 100 metres relay, in 3 successive Olympics). His accomplishment was later mooted by the doping disqualification of his teammate in 2008, Nesta Carter, reported in January 2017.

The following evening, the medals were presented by Valeriy Borzov, IOC member, Ukraine, and Du Zhaocai, Council Member of the IAAF.

== Records ==
Prior to the competition, the existing World and Olympic records were as follows.

World record	Jamaica (Nesta Carter, Michael Frater, Yohan Blake, Usain Bolt)	36.84	London, United Kingdom	11 August 2012
Olympic record	Jamaica (Nesta Carter, Michael Frater, Yohan Blake, Usain Bolt)	36.84	London, United Kingdom	11 August 2012
2016 World leading	Great Britain (James Dasaolu, Adam Gemili, James Ellington, CJ Ujah)	37.78	London, United Kingdom	23 July 2016

The following national records were established during the competition:

Country	Athletes	Round	Time	Notes
Turkey	Izzet Safer, Jak Ali Harvey, Emre Zafer Barnes, Ramil Guliyev (TUR)	Heats	38.30 s	
China	Tang Xingqiang, Xie Zhenye, Su Bingtian, Zhang Peimeng (CHN)	Heats	37.82 s	AR
Japan	Ryota Yamagata, Shota Iizuka, Yoshihide Kiryu, Asuka Cambridge (JPN)	Heats	37.68 s	AR
Japan	Ryota Yamagata, Shota Iizuka, Yoshihide Kiryu, Asuka Cambridge (JPN)	Final	37.60 s	AR
Canada	Akeem Haynes, Aaron Brown, Brendon Rodney, Andre De Grasse (CAN)	Final	37.64 s	

== Schedule ==
All times are Brazil time (UTC−3)

Date	Time	Round
Thursday, 18 August 2016	11:40	Heats
Friday, 19 August 2016	22:35	Finals

== Results ==
=== Heats ===
Qualification rule: first 3 of each heat (Q) plus the 2 fastest times (q) qualified.

==== Heat 1 ====
Rank	Lane	Nation	Competitors	Time	Notes
1	3	United States	Mike Rodgers, Christian Coleman, Tyson Gay, Jarrion Lawson	37.65	Q, SB
2	4	China	Tang Xingqiang, Xie Zhenye, Su Bingtian, Zhang Peimeng	37.82	Q, AR
3	2	Canada	Akeem Haynes, Aaron Brown, Brendon Rodney, Bolade Ajomale	37.89	Q, SB
4	6	Turkey	Izzet Safer, Jak Ali Harvey, Emre Zafer Barnes, Ramil Guliyev	38.30	NR
5	7	France	Marvin René, Stuart Dutamby, Mickael-Meba Zeze, Jimmy Vicaut	38.35	SB
6	8	Antigua and Barbuda	Chavaughn Walsh, Cejhae Greene, Jared Jarvis, Tahir Walsh	38.44	SB
7	5	Saint Kitts and Nevis	Jason Rogers, Kim Collins, Allistar Clarke, Antoine Adams	39.81	
–	1	Dominican Republic	Mayobanex de Oleo, Yohandris Andújar, Stanly del Carmen, Yancarlos Martinez	DQ	R 162.7

==== Heat 2 ====
Rank	Lane	Nation	Competitors	Time	Notes
1	6	Japan	Ryota Yamagata, Shota Iizuka, Yoshihide Kiryu, Asuka Cambridge	37.68	Q, AR
2	3	Jamaica	Jevaughn Minzie, Asafa Powell, Nickel Ashmeade, Kemar Bailey-Cole	37.94	Q, SB
3	7	Trinidad and Tobago	Keston Bledman, Rondel Sorrillo, Emmanuel Callender, Richard Thompson	37.96	Q, SB
4	1	Great Britain	Richard Kilty, Harry Aikines-Aryeetey, James Ellington, Chijindu Ujah	38.06	q
5	8	Brazil	Ricardo de Souza, Vitor Hugo dos Santos, Bruno de Barros, Jorge Vides	38.19	q
6	4	Germany	Julian Reus, Sven Knipphals, Robert Hering, Lucas Jakubczyk	38.26	
7	5	Cuba	César Ruiz, Roberto Skyers, Reynier Mena, Yaniel Carrero	38.47	
8	2	Netherlands	Solomon Bockarie, Hensley Paulina, Liemarvin Bonevacia, Giovanni Codrington	38.53	

=== Final ===
Rank	Lane	Nation	Competitors	Time	Notes
1st place, gold medalist(s)	4	Jamaica	Asafa Powell, Yohan Blake, Nickel Ashmeade, Usain Bolt	37.27	SB
2nd place, silver medalist(s)	5	Japan	Ryota Yamagata, Shota Iizuka, Yoshihide Kiryu, Asuka Cambridge	37.60	AR
3rd place, bronze medalist(s)	7	Canada	Akeem Haynes, Aaron Brown, Brendon Rodney, Andre De Grasse	37.64	NR
4	6	China	Tang Xingqiang, Xie Zhenye, Su Bingtian, Zhang Peimeng	37.90	
5	1	Great Britain	Richard Kilty, Harry Aikines-Aryeetey, James Ellington, Adam Gemili	37.98	
6	2	Brazil	Ricardo de Souza, Vitor Hugo dos Santos, Bruno de Barros, Jorge Vides	38.41	
–	8	Trinidad and Tobago	Keston Bledman, Rondel Sorrillo, Emmanuel Callender, Richard Thompson	DQ	R 163.3a
–	3	United States	Mike Rodgers, Justin Gatlin, Tyson Gay, Trayvon Bromell	DQ	R 170.7
