= Mikio Oda Memorial International Amateur Athletic Game =

Mikio Oda Memorial International Amateur Athletic Game (織田幹雄記念国際陸上競技大会, Oda Mikio Kinen Kokusai Rikujō Kyōgi Taikai) is one of the international athletic games. It takes place in April at Hiroshima Big Arch stadium in Hiroshima, Japan.

In 1967, this game began to commemorate the feat of Mikio Oda, a native of Hiroshima and the first Japanese Olympic gold medalist. It is one of the major track and field meets in Japan called Japan Grand Prix, and qualifying trials for World Championships and Summer Olympic Games have been held.
