= Akeem Haynes =

Canadian sprinter (b. 1992)

Personal information
- Nationality: Canadian
- Born: 11 March 1992 (age 34) Westmoreland Parish, Jamaica
- Height: 1.68 m (5 ft 6 in)
- Weight: 72 kg (159 lb)

Sport
- Country: Canada
- Sport: Running
- Event: 100 metres
- College team: University of Alabama

Achievements and titles
- Personal best: 100 m: 10.15 (Edmonton 2015)
Medal record
Olympic Games
Bronze medal – third place	2016 Rio de Janeiro	4 x 100 m relay

Akeem Haynes (born 11 March 1992) is a Canadian sprinter. Born in Jamaica, he moved together with his family to Yellowknife, Northwest Territories at age 7 before his family moved to Calgary when he was 10. Haynes qualified as a member of Canada's 4 × 100 m relay at the 2012 Summer Olympics in London by finishing fourth in the Canadian national championships but he was an unused substitute.

Despite injuries, he was named a First Team All-American in 2013 after finishing second in the 4 x 100 m at the NCAA championships with the University of Alabama.

He competed as part of Canada's Olympic team in Rio de Janeiro. In the 100 metre he ran a 10.24 in the heats and did not advance. Haynes was part of the 4 x 100 m relay team, which finished third in their heats to advance. In the final the team came agonizingly close to a medal; they were 0.02 seconds behind the third place United States team. However, the USA team was later disqualified for an improper baton pass, handing the bronze to Canada and Haynes who ran together with Andre De Grasse, Brendon Rodney, Aaron Brown, and Mobolade Ajomale who only ran in the heats.

On 2 January 2018, Haynes signed with the Hamilton Tiger-Cats of the Canadian Football League. He was released by the Tiger-Cats on 10 May 2018 before the start of preseason games.

== Awards ==
In August 2017, Haynes received the Athletes in Excellence Award from The Foundation for Global Sports Development in recognition of his community service efforts and work with youth.
