= Manabu Yokoyama =

Japanese pole vaulter

Personal information
- Nationality: Japanese
- Born: 20 July 1974 (age 51)

Sport
- Sport: Athletics
- Event: Pole vault

Manabu Yokoyama (横山 学, Yokoyama Manabu; born 20 July 1974) is a Japanese track and field athlete. He competed in the men's pole vault at the 2000 Summer Olympics.
