= Yoshihide Kiryū =

Japanese sprinter (born 1995)

Yoshihide Kiryu
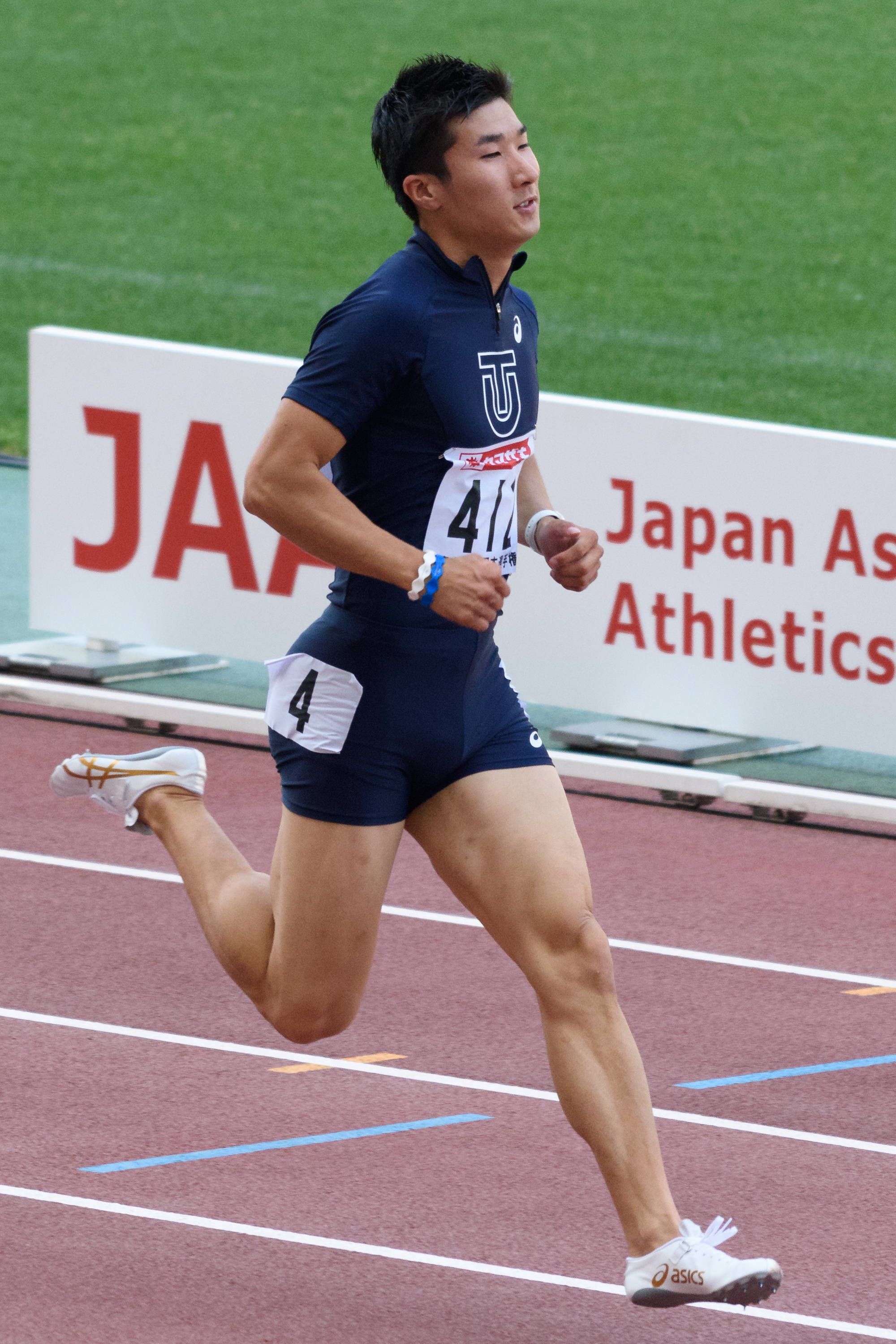
- Kiryu at the 2017 Japan Championships

Personal information
- Nationality: Japanese
- Born: 15 December 1995 (age 30) Hikone, Shiga Prefecture, Japan
- Height: 1.75 m (5 ft 9 in)
- Weight: 69 kg (152 lb)

Sport
- Country: Japan
- Sport: Athletics
- Event: 100 metres
- University team: Toyo University
- Team: Nippon Life
- Coached by: Hiroyasu Tsuchie

Achievements and titles
- Personal bests: 60 m: 6.53 (2024); 100 m: 9.98 (2017); 200 m: 20.41 (2013)
Medal record
Olympic Games
Silver medal – second place	2016 Rio de Janeiro	4×100 m relay
World Championships
Bronze medal – third place	2017 London	4×100 m relay
Bronze medal – third place	2019 Doha	4×100 m relay
World Relays
Bronze medal – third place	2015 Nassau	4×100 m relay
Asian Games
Gold medal – first place	2018 Jakarta	4×100 m relay
Silver medal – second place	2023 Hangzhou	4×100 m relay
Asian Championships
Gold medal – first place	2019 Doha	100 metres
World Junior Championships
Silver medal – second place	2014 Eugene	4×100 m relay
Bronze medal – third place	2014 Eugene	100 metres

Yoshihide Kiryū (桐生 祥秀, Kiryū Yoshihide; born 15 December 1995) is a Japanese sprinter who specializes in the 100 metres.

Born in Hikone, Shiga Prefecture, Kiryū played football while at elementary school and became interested in track and field at junior high school, as his brother took part in the sport. In 2011, he won the under-16 national title in the 100 metres at the National Sports Festival of Japan, with a time of 10.58 seconds.

The following year, Kiryū ran in the under-18 category at the same competition and broke the world youth best for the 100 metres by bettering Tamunosiki Atorudibo's record of 10.23 seconds by two hundredths of a second on 5 October 2012. Less than a month later, on 3 November 2012, Kiryū lowered his own record to 10.19 seconds.

On 29 April 2013, Kiryū (still a student at Rakunan High School in Tō-ji) ran at the Oda Memorial meet and tied the World junior record of 10.01 seconds co-held by Darrel Brown and Jeffery Demps. The IAAF subsequently rejected the inclusion of the time as an official record due to the use of unapproved wind-speed measurement equipment on the track.

At the 2016 Summer Olympics, Kiryū won a silver medal in the 4 × 100 metres relay.

Records
Preceded by Tamunosiki Atorudibo	Boys' World Youth Best Holder, 100 metres 5 October 2012 – 31 March 2017	Succeeded by Anthony Schwartz
