= 2011 World Youth Championships in Athletics – Boys' medley relay =

Boys' medley relay at the 2011 World Youth Championships in Athletics
- Venue: Stadium Lille Métropole
- Dates: 9 July (heats); 10 July (final)
- Nations: 32
- Winning time: 1:49.47 WYB

Medalists
gold medal	Ronald Darby; Aldrich Bailey; Najee Glass; Arman Hall; Cameron Burrell	United States
silver medal	Kazuma Ōseto; Akiyuki Hashimoto; Shotaro Aikyo; Takuya Fukunaga; Kazuya Tsukamoto	Japan
bronze medal	Wilhem Belocian; Méba-Mickaël Zeze; Jordan Geenen; Thomas Jordier; Gautier Dautremer	France

The boys' medley relay at the 2011 World Youth Championships in Athletics was held at the Stadium Lille Métropole on 9 and 10 July.

== Medalists ==
Gold	Silver	Bronze
United States; Ronald Darby; Aldrich Bailey; Najee Glass; Arman Hall; Cameron Burrell	Japan; Kazuma Ōseto; Akiyuki Hashimoto; Shotaro Aikyo; Takuya Fukunaga; Kazuya Tsukamoto	France; Wilhem Belocian; Méba-Mickaël Zeze; Jordan Geenen; Thomas Jordier; Gautier Dautremer

== Records ==
Prior to the competition, the following records were as follows.

World Youth Best	United States	1:50.33	Bressanone, Italy	12 July 2009
Championship Record	United States	1:50.33	Bressanone, Italy	12 July 2009
World Youth Leading	Hungary	1:54.57	Veszprém, Hungary	11 June 2011

== Heats ==
Qualification rule: first 1 of each heat (Q) plus the 4 fastest times (q) qualified.

=== Heat 1 ===
Rank	Lane	Nation	Athletes	Time	Note
1	3	United States	Cameron Burrell, Aldrich Bailey, Arman Hall, Najee Glass	1:51.53	Q, WYL
2	1	Brazil	Flávio Lucena, Renato dos Santos, Maykon da Cunha, Carlos Grachet	1:54.68	q, SB
3	4	Norway	Daniel Lauritzen, Henrik Overvåg, Jørgen Kåshagen, Sondre Lid	1:56.43	PB
4	2	Thailand	Kritsada Namsuwan, Kacha Sawangyen, Ruttanapon Sowan, Nitipol Thongpoon	1:57.19	SB
5	8	Spain	Fernando Ramos, Adrián Pérez, Sergi Torres, Lucas Búa	1:57.23	SB
6	5	Bahrain	Abdulla Al-Amiri, Ahmed Al-Shawoosh, Husain Mubarak, Ali Khamis	1:59.16	PB
7	6	Algeria	Ali El-Islam, Sid-Ali Khedim, Kenzi Yedjedd, Mohamed Belbachir	1:59.89	SB
	7	Canada	Andre Azonwanna, Wesley Best, Brendon Restall, Brandon McBride	DQ	

=== Heat 2 ===
Rank	Lane	Nation	Athletes	Time	Note
1	7	Japan	Kazuya Tsukamoto, Kazuma Ōseto, Shotaro Aikyo, Takuya Fukunaga	1:52.45	Q, SB
2	8	Bahamas	Anthony Adderley, Delano Davis, Stephen Newbold, Andre Wells	1:52.66	q, PB
3	2	Saudi Arabia	Humod Al-Wani, Fahhad Al-Subaie, Yahya Barnawi, Ahmed Al-Khayri	1:54.92	SB
4	3	Tunisia	Haythem Aissa, Zied Aissa, Abdessalem Ayouni, Riadh Sayeh	1:59.18	PB
5	6	Kuwait	Abdulrazaq Al-Mutairi, Mohammad Eissa, Ali Mohammed, Sayed Ali	2:00.69	SB
	5	South Africa	Hendrik Khumalo, Fana Mofokeng, Lorenzo Adams, Pieter Conradie	DQ	
	1	Zimbabwe	Tafara Hleruka, Lawrence Muyambo, Khuphukile Chilufya, Cliford Charuka	DQ	
	4	Barbados		DNS	

=== Heat 3 ===
Rank	Lane	Nation	Athletes	Time	Note
1	4	France	Wilhem Belocian, Gautier Dautremer, Jordan Geenen, Thomas Jordier	1:53.01	Q, PB
2	6	Poland	Marcin Ciechanowicz, Adam Jabłoński, Rafał Smoleń, Patryk Dobek	1:53.05	q, SB
3	1	Iraq	Bahaaldin Baban, Hasanain Zubaiyen, Ahmed Husam, Mones Al-Bayati	1:55.19	SB
4	2	Mexico	César Ramírez, Juan Alanís, Ever Carranza, José de Jesús	1:56.56	SB
5	8	Ukraine	Oleh Polovytsya, Volodymyr Suprun, Oleksiy Matskevych, Oleksiy Pozdnyakov	1:56.62	PB
6	3	Italy	Giovanni Cellario, Lorenzo Bilotti, Lorenzo Perini, Vincenzo Vigliotti	1:56.83	SB
7	5	Bermuda	Jeneko Place, Bruce DeGrilla, Scott Clarke, Kyle Webb	1:59.51	PB
	7	Slovakia		DNS	

=== Heat 4 ===
Rank	Lane	Nation	Athletes	Time	Note
1	2	Trinidad and Tobago	Ruebin Walters, Jereem Richards, Theon Lewis, Machel Cedenio	1:53.32	Q, SB
2	3	Jamaica	Tyler Mason, Odail Todd, Lennox Williams, Omar McLeod	1:53.66	q, SB
3	8	Nigeria	Harry Chukwudike, Oluwarotimi Adebayo, Friday Bariadora, Chibuzor Igiliegbe	1:54.85	PB
4	4	Singapore	Tan Zong Yang, Donovan Chan, Timothee Yap Jin Wei, Ng Chin Hui	1:56.46	PB
5	6	Romania	Mihai Petrescu, Alexandru Terpezan, Ștefan Găinușă, Mihai Romas	1:57.73	PB
6	1	Oman	Idris Al-Azari, Haithan Al-Saadi, Usama Al-Gheilani, Mohmmed Al-Shueili	1:57.74	PB
	7	Hungary	Bálint Cseresznyés, Péter Csuhai, Dávid Bartha, Bálint Móricz	DQ	
	5	China		DNS	

== Final ==
Rank	Lane	Nation	Athletes	Time	Note
1st place, gold medalist(s)	3	United States	Ronald Darby, Aldrich Bailey, Najee Glass, Arman Hall	1:49.47	WYB
2nd place, silver medalist(s)	4	Japan	Kazuma Ōseto, Akiyuki Hashimoto, Shotaro Aikyo, Takuya Fukunaga	1:50.69	PB
3rd place, bronze medalist(s)	5	France	Wilhem Belocian, Méba-Mickaël Zeze, Jordan Geenen, Thomas Jordier	1:51.81	PB
4	7	Poland	Marcin Ciechanowicz, Adam Jabłoński, Rafał Smoleń, Patryk Dobek	1:52.42	SB
5	8	Bahamas	Tommy Outten, Delano Davis, Stephen Newbold, Andre Wells	1:52.51	PB
6	6	Trinidad and Tobago	Ruebin Walters, Jereem Richards, Theon Lewis, Machel Cedenio	1:52.77	SB
7	2	Brazil	Flávio Lucena, Renato dos Santos, Maykon da Cunha, Carlos Grachet	1:53.59	SB
	1	Jamaica	Tyler Mason, Odail Todd, Lennox Williams, Omar McLeod	DNS	
