= 2011 World Youth Championships in Athletics – Boys' 200 metres =

Boys' 200 metres at the 2011 World Youth Championships in Athletics
- Venue: Stadium Lille Métropole
- Dates: 8 July (heats); 9 July (semifinal); 10 July (final)
- Competitors: 82
- Winning time: 20.89 PB

Medalists
gold medal	Stephen Newbold	Bahamas
silver medal	Odail Todd	Jamaica
bronze medal	Ronald Darby	United States

The boys' 200 metres at the 2011 World Youth Championships in Athletics was held at the Stadium Lille Métropole on 8, 9 and 10 July. The event was won by Stephen Newbold of The Bahamas. Arman Hall, who ran the 2011 world youth leading over 200 metres, was switched to the 400 metres before the championship.

== Medalists ==
Gold	Silver	Bronze
Stephen Newbold; Bahamas	Odail Todd; Jamaica	Ronald Darby; United States

== Records ==
Prior to the competition, the following records were as follows.

World Youth Best	Usain Bolt (JAM)	20.13	Bridgetown, Barbados	20 July 2003
Championship Record	Usain Bolt (JAM)	20.40	Sherbrooke, Canada	13 July 2003
World Youth Leading	Arman Hall (USA)	20.82	Miami, United States	5 March 2011

No new records were set during the competition.

== Heats ==
Qualification rule: first 2 of each heat (Q) plus the 2 fastest times (q) qualified.

=== Heat 1 ===
Rank	Lane	Name	Nationality	Time	Notes
1	1	Hendrik Khumalo	South Africa	21.58	Q
2	6	Joshua Hawkins	New Zealand	21.75	Q
3	7	Zenebe Madfu	Ethiopia	22.20	PB
4	8	Dávid Bartha	Hungary	22.39	
5	4	Juan Alanis	Mexico	22.51	
6	5	Hamza Bendoukkalia	Morocco	22.87	
7	2	Cliford Charuka	Zimbabwe	23.13	PB
8	3	Julien Meunier	Mauritius	23.21	

=== Heat 2 ===
Rank	Lane	Name	Nationality	Time	Notes
1	3	Odail Todd	Jamaica	21.60	Q
2	2	Adam Jabłoński	Poland	21.74	Q
3	5	Jeon Hyeok-jin	South Korea	22.13	
4	7	Luka Janežič	Slovenia	22.49	
5	1	Oluwarotimi Adebayo	Nigeria	22.88	
6	4	Andrea Ercolani Volta	San Marino	24.69	
	6	Sajith de Silva	Sri Lanka	DNS	

=== Heat 3 ===
Rank	Lane	Name	Nationality	Time	Notes
1	2	Andre Azonwanna	Canada	21.51	Q
2	5	Marcus Lawler	Ireland	21.63	Q, PB
3	8	Jonathan Permal	Mauritius	22.01	
4	4	Jean-Yves Esparon	Seychelles	22.57	PB
5	1	Mohmmed Al-Shueili	Oman	22.58	
6	7	Ştefan Găinuşă	Romania	22.80	
7	3	Chu Wai In	Macau	24.37	PB
	6	Deon Hope	Barbados	DNS	

=== Heat 4 ===
Rank	Lane	Name	Nationality	Time	Notes
1	4	Zhang Mingming	China	21.87	Q
2	6	Bernardo Baloyes	Colombia	21.89	Q
2	3	Mohammad Sico Ibrahim	Saudi Arabia	21.89	q, PB
4	1	Gautier Dautremer	France	22.05	
5	2	Harry Chukwudike	Nigeria	22.11	
6	7	Choi Dong-baek	South Korea	22.38	
7	5	Kyle Webb	Bermuda	22.49	PB

=== Heat 5 ===
Rank	Lane	Name	Nationality	Time	Notes
1	5	Jereem Richards	Trinidad and Tobago	21.85	Q
2	4	Tatsuro Suwa	Japan	21.94	Q
3	1	Luka Žontar	Slovenia	22.43	
4	2	Anthony Adderley	Bahamas	22.64	
5	6	Marden Alves	Brazil	22.97	
6	7	Haithan Al-Saadi	Oman	23.49	
7	3	Thomas Farrugia	Malta	23.60	

=== Heat 6 ===
Rank	Lane	Name	Nationality	Time	Notes
1	4	Hugh Donovan	Australia	21.47	Q, SB
2	2	Akiyuki Hashimoto	Japan	21.58	Q
3	1	Cejhae Greene	Antigua and Barbuda	21.81	
4	7	Oleh Polovytsya	Ukraine	22.21	
5	3	Jatin Jain	India	23.31	
6	5	Haythem Aissa	Tunisia	23.35	
	6	Houcine Abdelkaoui	Algeria	DNF	

=== Heat 7 ===
Rank	Lane	Name	Nationality	Time	Notes
1	7	Méba-Mickaël Zeze	France	21.42	Q
2	1	Ruttanapon Sowan	Thailand	21.86	Q
3	6	Sapwaturrahman	Indonesia	22.13	
4	4	Volodymyr Suprun	Ukraine	22.15	
5	5	Adrián Pérez	Spain	22.45	
6	3	Alexandru Terpezan	Romania	22.46	PB
7	2	Ali Seif El Islam Agab	Algeria	22.86	

=== Heat 8 ===
Rank	Lane	Name	Nationality	Time	Notes
1	2	Stephen Newbold	Bahamas	21.40	Q
2	8	Mike Nyang'au	Kenya	21.55	Q
3	4	Chan Yan Lam	Hong Kong	22.01	
4	7	Sondre Nyvold Lid	Norway	22.14	PB
5	1	César Holguín	Dominican Republic	22.78	
6	5	Abdelrahman Abu Al-Hummos	Jordan	23.22	PB
7	3	Lawrence Muyambo	Zimbabwe	24.59	PB
	6	Carlos Nascimento	Portugal	DNS	

=== Heat 9 ===
Rank	Lane	Name	Nationality	Time	Notes
1	3	Aldrich Bailey	United States	21.46	Q
2	8	Wesley Best	Canada	21.91	Q
3	4	Fahhad Al-Subaie	Saudi Arabia	22.19	
4	1	Tan Zong Yang	Singapore	22.67	
5	6	Lukáš Meszáros	Slovakia	22.74	
6	2	Jerai Torres	Gibraltar	23.16	PB
7	5	Brian Thomas	Grenada	23.81	PB
	7	Ever Carranza	Mexico	DQ	

=== Heat 10 ===
Rank	Lane	Name	Nationality	Time	Notes
1	3	Odean Skeen	Jamaica	21.75	Q
2	6	Jeneko Place	Bermuda	21.89	Q
3	4	Tahir Walsh	Antigua and Barbuda	21.97	
4	8	Marek Bakalár	Czech Republic	22.23	
5	5	Gerald Drummond	Costa Rica	22.55	PB
6	2	Ng Chin Hui	Singapore	22.72	
7	7	Vitalii Karnaukhov	Kyrgyzstan	23.13	
8	1	Giga Tchikadze	Georgia	23.69	PB

=== Heat 11 ===
Rank	Lane	Name	Nationality	Time	Notes
1	2	Ronald Darby	United States	21.50	Q
2	6	Nethaneel Mitchell-Blake	Great Britain	21.67	Q
3	7	Fana Mofokeng	South Africa	21.78	q
4	3	Kacha Sawangyen	Thailand	22.52	
5	1	Rait Veesalu	Estonia	22.57	
6	4	Kolbeinn Höður Gunnarsson	Iceland	22.61	PB
7	5	Álvaro Toledo	Bolivia	23.81	

== Semifinals ==
Qualification rule: first 2 of each heat (Q) plus the 2 fastest times (q) qualified.

=== Heat 1 ===
Rank	Lane	Name	Nationality	Time	Notes
1	4	Stephen Newbold	Bahamas	21.08	Q, PB
2	7	Akiyuki Hashimoto	Japan	21.20	Q
3	6	Andre Azonwanna	Canada	21.21	q, PB
4	3	Hendrik Khumalo	South Africa	21.47	
5	1	Bernardo Baloyes	Colombia	21.59	
6	5	Mike Nyang'au	Kenya	21.62	
7	8	Ruttanapon Sowan	Thailand	21.84	
8	2	Jeneko Place	Bermuda	22.03	

=== Heat 2 ===
Rank	Lane	Name	Nationality	Time	Notes
1	4	Odail Todd	Jamaica	21.02	Q, PB
2	6	Ronald Darby	United States	21.08	Q
3	3	Méba-Mickaël Zeze	France	21.21	q
4	2	Tatsuro Suwa	Japan	21.48	
5	1	Mohammad Sico Ibrahim	Saudi Arabia	21.48	PB
6	7	Joshua Hawkins	New Zealand	21.49	
7	8	Marcus Lawler	Ireland	21.81	
	5	Zhang Mingming	China	DQ	

=== Heat 3 ===
Rank	Lane	Name	Nationality	Time	Notes
1	3	Aldrich Bailey	United States	21.29	Q, PB
2	6	Hugh Donovan	Australia	21.46	Q, SB
3	5	Jereem Richards	Trinidad and Tobago	21.47	PB
4	7	Adam Jabłoński	Poland	21.56	
5	8	Nethaneel Mitchell-Blake	Great Britain	21.61	
6	2	Fana Mofokeng	South Africa	21.79	
7	1	Wesley Best	Canada	21.91	
	4	Odean Skeen	Jamaica	DQ	

== Final ==
Rank	Lane	Name	Nationality	Time	Notes
1st place, gold medalist(s)	6	Stephen Newbold	Bahamas	20.89	PB
2nd place, silver medalist(s)	4	Odail Todd	Jamaica	21.00	PB
3rd place, bronze medalist(s)	5	Ronald Darby	United States	21.08	
4	8	Akiyuki Hashimoto	Japan	21.21	
5	1	Méba-Mickaël Zeze	France	21.30	
6	3	Aldrich Bailey	United States	21.36	
7	2	Andre Azonwanna	Canada	21.40	
8	7	Hugh Donovan	Australia	21.46	SB
