= Ronald Darby =

American football player (born 1994)

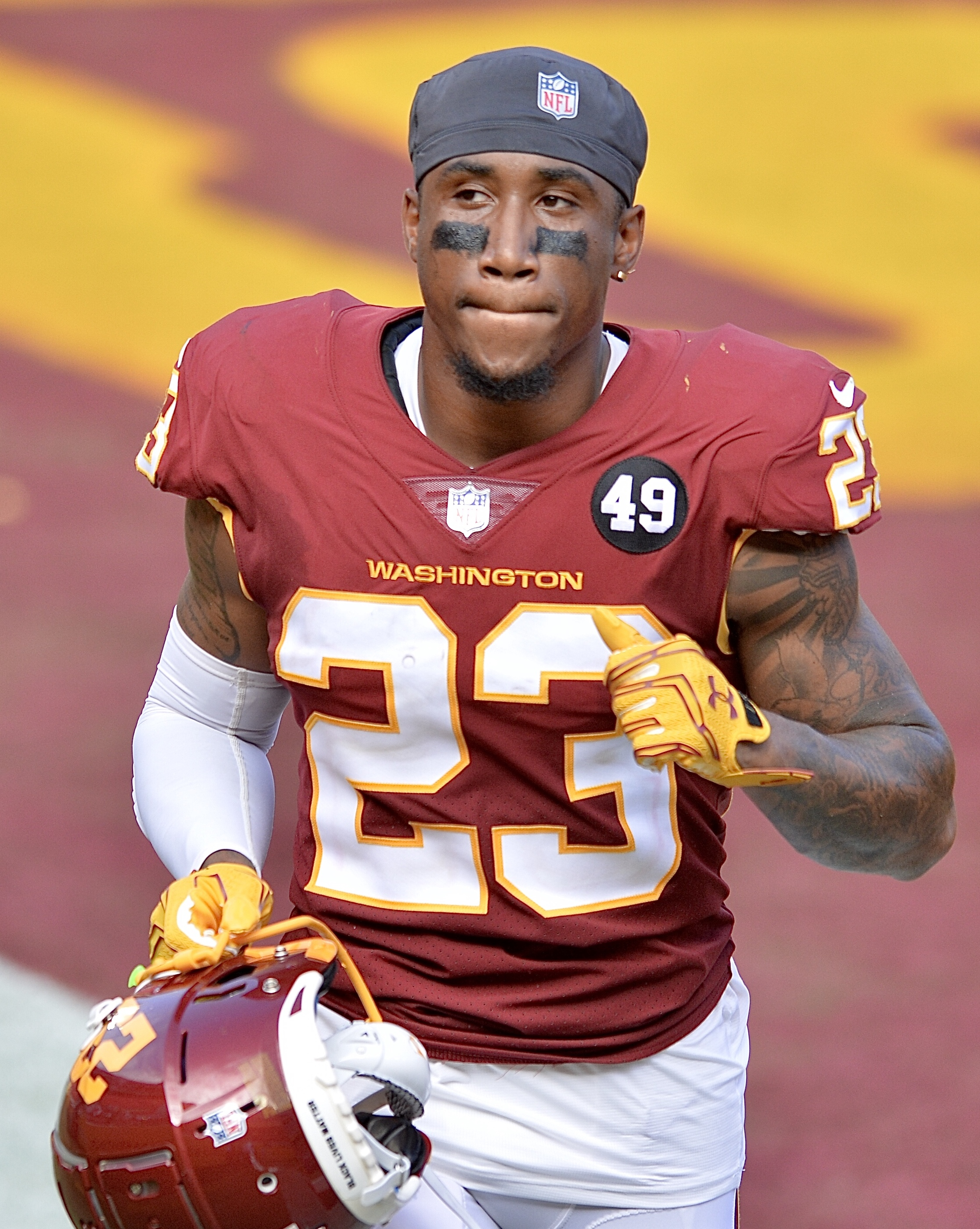
- Darby with the Washington Football Team in 2020

No. 28, 41, 21, 23, 25
- Position: Cornerback

Personal information
- Born: January 2, 1994 (age 32); Oxon Hill, Maryland, U.S.
- Listed height: 5 ft 11 in (1.80 m)
- Listed weight: 193 lb (88 kg)

Career information
- High school: Potomac (Oxon Hill)
- College: Florida State (2012–2014)
- NFL draft: 2015: 2nd round, 50th overall pick

Career history
- Buffalo Bills (2015–2016); Philadelphia Eagles (2017–2019); Washington Commanders (2020); Denver Broncos (2021–2022); Baltimore Ravens (2023); Jacksonville Jaguars (2024); Houston Texans (2025)*
- * Offseason or practice squad member only

Awards and highlights
- Super Bowl champion (LII); PFWA All-Rookie Team (2015); BCS national champion (2013); ACC Defensive Rookie of the Year (2012)

Career NFL statistics
- Total tackles: 447
- Forced fumbles: 1
- Fumble recoveries: 1
- Pass deflections: 106
- Interceptions: 8
- Stats at Pro Football Reference

Ronald Darby (born January 2, 1994) is an American former professional football player who was a cornerback for 10 seasons in the National Football League (NFL). He played college football for the Florida State Seminoles and was selected by the Buffalo Bills in the second round of the 2015 NFL draft. He has played for the Philadelphia Eagles, Washington Commanders, Denver Broncos, Baltimore Ravens, and Jacksonville Jaguars. A world-class sprinter during his high school years, Darby won medals at the 2011 World Youth Championships in Athletics.

== Early life ==
Darby attended Potomac High School in Oxon Hill, Maryland, where he played as many as six different positions on offense, defense, and special teams. Excelling on defense, Darby was part of a Wolverines' secondary that also included Tavon Young, and which registered four shutouts and allowed just 82 points in 2011. Darby was a USA Today and Sports Illustrated High School All-American in 2011, and participated in the 2012 Under Armour All-American Game. as a junior, rushed for 1,329 yards and 23 touchdowns, while tallying three interceptions and eight pass breakups on defense.

Regarded as a four-star recruit by Rivals.com, Darby, running a 4.37-second 40-yard dash, was ranked as the No. 2 cornerback prospect in his class, behind only Tracy Howard. He chose Florida State over Notre Dame, Maryland, Clemson and Auburn.

Ronald Darby
Medal record

Men's athletics

Representing the United States

World Youth Championships
Gold medal – first place	2011 Lille	Medley relay
Bronze medal – third place	2011 Lille	200 m

Darby won a bronze medal in the 200 m at the 2011 World Youth Championships in Athletics. He also finished fourth in the 100 m. Along with Aldrich Bailey, Najee Glass, and Arman Hall, he ran a World Youth Best in the meet's medley relay.

His personal bests are 6.77 seconds in the 60 meters, 10.41 seconds in the 100 meters and 21.05 seconds in the 200 meters.

== College career ==
As a true freshman at Florida State, Darby was part of a Florida State defense that led the Atlantic Coast Conference (ACC) in points allowed (15.1 per game) and yards allowed (253.8). They ranked seventh in the FBS. Although exclusively a back-up to Xavier Rhodes and Nick Waisome, Darby registered 18 tackles and broke up seven passes in 2012, which earned him ACC Defensive Rookie of the Year honors. Darby was also named Freshman All-American by the Football Writers Association of America. In the 2013 Orange Bowl vs. Northern Illinois, Darby registered four solo tackles and one defended pass. As a sophomore, he played in 14 games with nine starts, including playing in, and winning the 2013 BCS National Championship Game. For the season he had 14 tackles and two interceptions. As a junior in 2014, he started all 14 games and recorded 43 tackles. Additionally, Darby was a brother of Pi Kappa Alpha fraternity while attending Florida State University.

After his junior season, Darby entered the 2015 NFL draft.

== Professional career ==
=== Pre-draft ===
External videos
- Ronald Darby's NFL Combine Workout
- Ronald Darby runs the 40-yard dash

NFL draft analysts projected Darby to be selected in the second or third round. He attended the NFL Combine and performed well in the 40, 20, and 10-yard dash. He participated at Florida State's Pro Day, but only performed positional drills. He had pre-draft visits with the Tampa Bay Buccaneers, Indianapolis Colts, Carolina Panthers, Tennessee Titans, and New York Jets. NFL analyst Lance Zierlein ranked him as the third-best cornerback in the draft. Sports Illustrated ranked Darby as the sixth-best cornerback prospect in the draft. NFLDraftScout.com had him ranked as the seventh best cornerback available in the draft.

Pre-draft measurables
Height	Weight	Arm length	Hand span	Wingspan	40-yard dash	10-yard split	20-yard split	20-yard shuttle	Three-cone drill	Vertical jump	Broad jump	Bench press
5 ft 10 5/8 in (1.79 m)	193 lb (88 kg)	31 3/8 in (0.80 m)	8 5/8 in (0.22 m)	6 ft 2 5/8 in (1.90 m)	4.38 s	1.53 s	2.56 s	4.14 s	6.94 s	41.5 in (1.05 m)	10 ft 9 in (3.28 m)	15 reps
All values from NFL Combine/Pro Day

=== Buffalo Bills ===
The Buffalo Bills selected Darby in the second round (50th overall) of the 2015 NFL draft. He was the seventh cornerback drafted and was the first of two cornerbacks selected from Florida State, along with third-round pick (78th overall) P. J. Williams.

External videos
- Buffalo Bills select Ronald Darby No. 50
- ESPN NFL Draft Profile: Ronald Darby

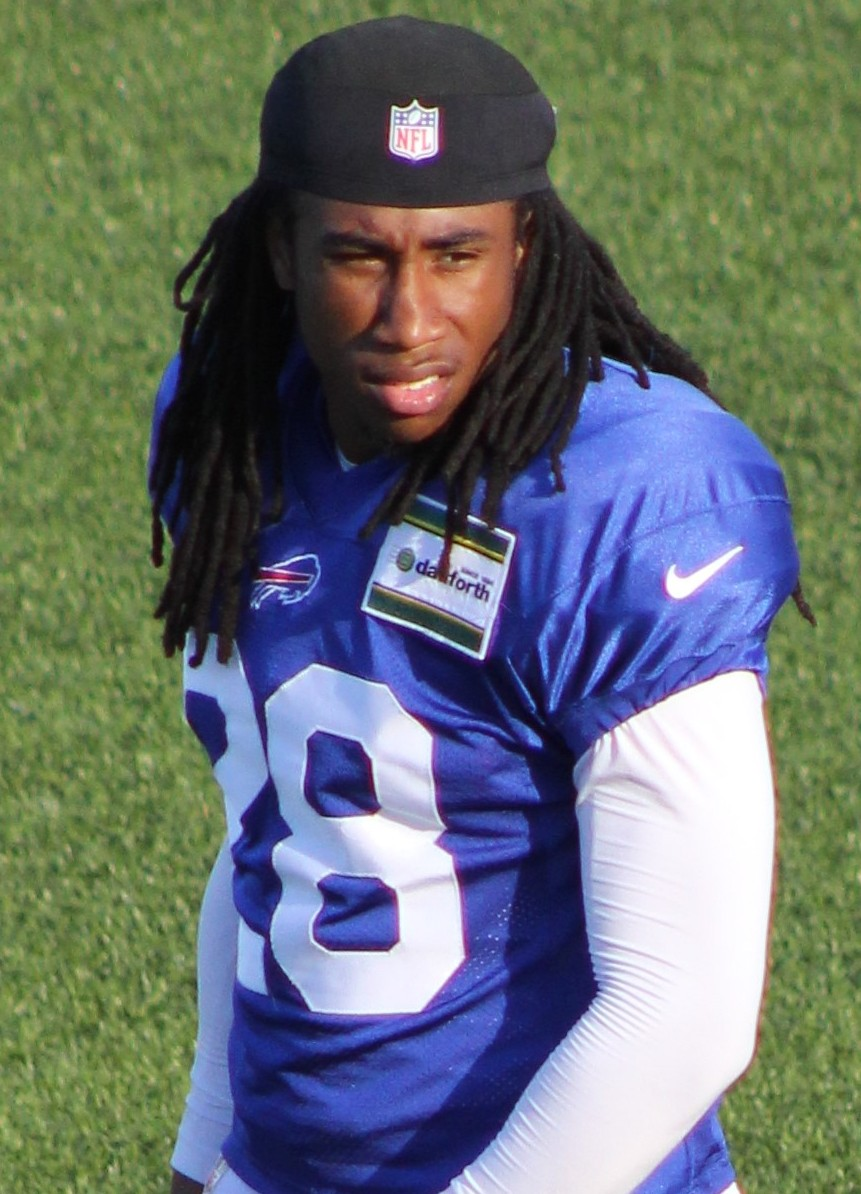
Darby as a rookie with the Bills, 2015

"He's physical, not only with the ball carriers, but as a press guy and Rex is a big press guy. He has physical attributes, height weight, plays with speed. Not great production this year, but he also wasn't challenged much this year, and he can come in and learn behind some quality corners. We had some talks, got close, but nothing came to fruition. We were excited to move down, but we're more excited to have Darby. Three things: We said at the beginning of the draft we were going to take the best player; we can take a corner every year; and with the additions the other teams have made in this division, we have to keep up in the arms race."

— Doug Whaley (Buffalo Bills General Manager)

==== 2015 ====
On May 19, 2015, the Buffalo Bills signed Darby to a four–year, US$4.56 million rookie contract that included $2.17 million guaranteed and a signing bonus of $1.58 million.

Throughout training camp, he competed against Leodis McKelvin, Corey Graham, Ross Cockrell, Nickell Robey, and Ron Brooks to be a starting cornerback under defensive coordinator Dennis Thurman. Head coach Rex Ryan named him the a starting cornerback to begin the season and paired him with Stephon Gilmore.

On September 13, 2015, Darby made his professional regular season debut and first career start in the Buffalo Bills' home-opener against the Indianapolis Colts and made six combined tackles (five solo), two pass deflections, and had his first career interception on a pass thrown by Andrew Luck to wide receiver T. Y. Hilton during a 27–14 victory. In Week 3, he recorded five combined tackles (four solo), set a season-high with four pass deflections, and intercepted a pass by Ryan Tannehill to tight end Jordan Cameron during a 41–14 victory at the Miami Dolphins. His performance earned him the AFC Defensive Rookie of the Month for September. In Week 9, Darby collected a season-high ten solo tackles and made a pass deflection as the Bills defeated the Miami Dolphins 33–17. He was inactive for the Bills' 16–6 victory against the Dallas Cowboys in Week 16 after suffering a groin injury. He finished his rookie season with 68 combined tackles (61 solo), 21 pass deflections, and two interceptions in 15 games and 15 starts, while also being named Pro Football Focus' Defensive Rookie of the Year. He was named to the PFWA All-Rookie Team. He received an overall grade of 86.3 from Pro Football Focus, which is the fifth highest grade by a rookie cornerback since PFF began.

==== 2016 ====
He entered training camp slated as the de facto No. 2 starting cornerback. Head coach Rex Ryan retained Darby and Stephon Gilmore as the starting cornerbacks following their successful performance in 2015.

On September 15, 2016, Darby made six combined tackles (five solo) and set a season-high with three pass deflections as the Bills were defeated 31–37 by the New York Jets. He was inactive for the Bills' 33–18 victory against the Arizona Cardinals in Week 3 due to a hamstring injury. In Week 7, he collected a season-high eight solo tackles during a 28–25 loss at the Miami Dolphins. On November 27, 2016, Darby made four solo tackles before exiting in the first quarter of a 28–21 win against the Jacksonville Jaguars after suffering a concussion after running back Chris Ivory accidentally delivered a knee into Darby's helmet while he was attempting a hurdle as Darby dove for a tackle. He remained in concussion protocol and was subsequently inactive for a 38–24 loss at the Oakland Raiders the following week. In Week 14, he collected a season-high ten combined tackles (seven solo) during a 27–20 loss to the Pittsburgh Steelers. On December 27, 2016, the Bills announced their decision to fire head coach Rex Ryan after falling to a 7–8 record and appointed offensive coordinator Anthony Lynn to interim head coach for the last game of the season. He finished the 2016 NFL season with 69 combined tackles (60 solo) and 12 pass deflections in 14 games and 14 starts. He received an overall grade of 70.6 from Pro Football Focus in 2016, which ranked 66th among all qualifying cornerbacks.

==== 2017 ====
On January 11, 2017, the Buffalo Bills hired Carolina Panthers' defensive coordinator Sean McDermott as their new head coach. He entered training camp slated as the No. 1 starting cornerback following the departure of Stephon Gilmore and was paired with rookie first round pick Tre'Davious White under new defensive coordinator Leslie Frazier.

=== Philadelphia Eagles ===
On August 11, 2017, the Bills traded Darby to the Philadelphia Eagles for slot wide receiver Jordan Matthews and a third round pick (96th overall) in the 2018 NFL draft. During training camp, he competed to be a starting cornerback against Patrick Robinson, Rasul Douglas, and Jalen Mills under defensive coordinator Jim Schwartz. Head coach Doug Pederson named him the No. 1 starting cornerback to begin the season and paired him with Jalen Mills.

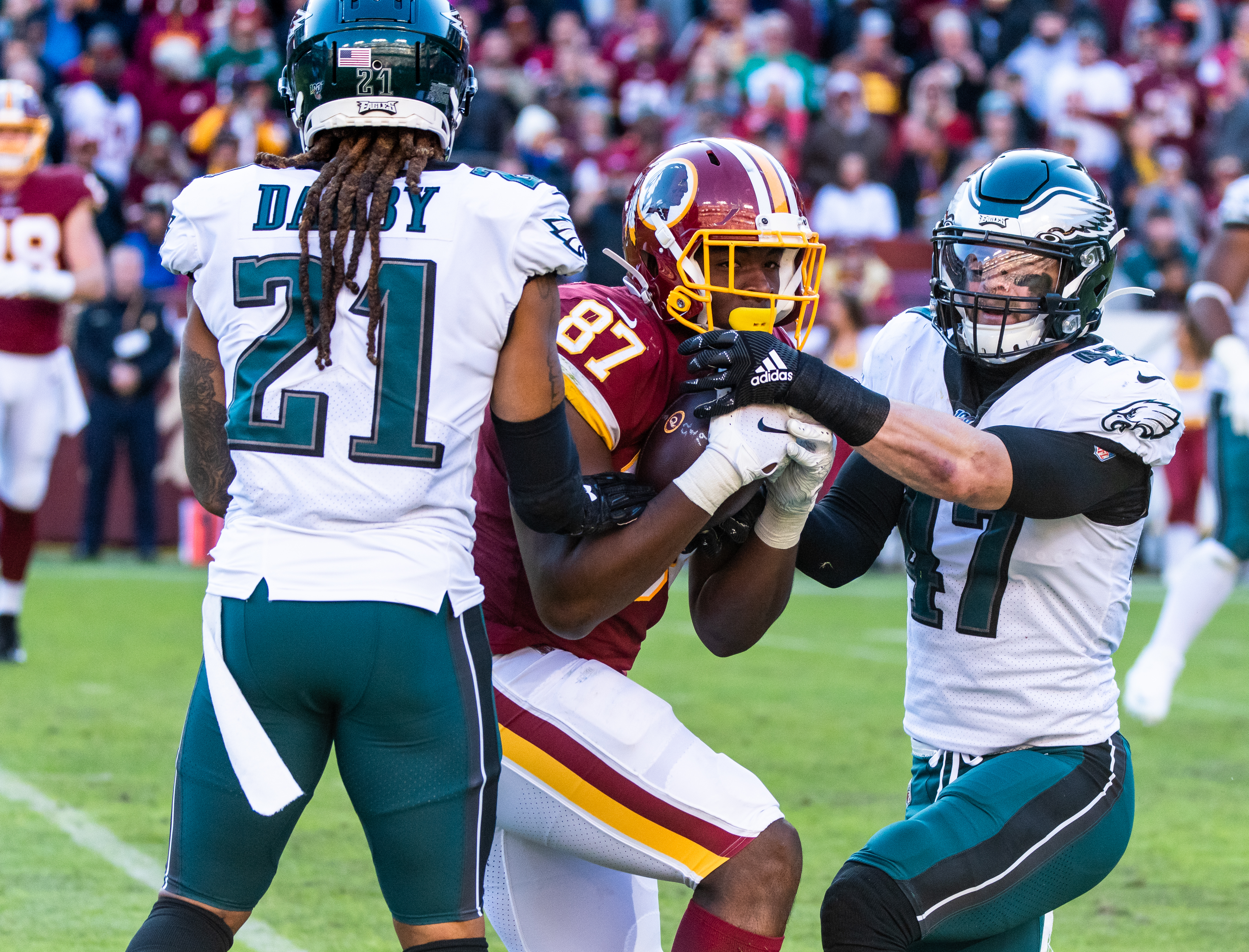
Darby in 2019

On September 10, 2017, Darby made his debut with the Philadelphia Eagles in their season-opener at the Washington Redskins and made one solo tackle before being carted off the field in the second quarter of a 30–17 victory after injuring his ankle. The following day, it was reported that Darby was diagnosed with a dislocated ankle and was expected to be out for 4–6 weeks. On November 19, 2017, Darby returned from injury after missing eight games (Weeks 2–9) and collected a season-high eight solo tackles, made two pass deflections, and had his first interception of the season on a pass thrown by Dak Prescott to wide receiver Dez Bryant as the Eagles won 37–9 at the Dallas Cowboys. In Week 15, he made five solo tackles, set a season-high with three pass deflections, and intercepted a pass by Eli Manning to wide receiver Roger Lewis during a 34–29 win at the New York Giants. The following week, Darby made six combined tackles (three solo), a pass deflection, and secured the Eagles' 19-10 victory against the Oakland Raiders after intercepting a pass by Derek Carr to wide receiver Amari Cooper with 57 seconds remaining in the fourth quarter. He finished with 34 combined tackles (30 solo), a career-high three interceptions, and nine passes defended in eight games and seven starts. He earned an overall grade of 78.3 from Pro Football Focus in 2017.

The Philadelphia Eagles finished the 2017 NFL season first in the NFC East with a 13–3 record to clinch a first-round bye. On January 17, 2018, Darby started in his first career playoff appearance and made seven solo tackles and a pass deflection as the Eagles defeated the Atlanta Falcons 15–10 in the Divisional Round. The following week, he recorded seven combined tackles (five solo) and a team-high three pass deflections as the Eagles routed the Minnesota Vikings 38–7 in the NFC Championship Game to advance to the Super Bowl. On February 4, 2018, Darby started in Super Bowl LII and had four solo tackles and two pass deflections as the Eagles defeated the New England Patriots 41–33.

==== 2018 ====
He returned as the Eagles' No. 1 starting cornerback in 2018 and was again paired with Jalen Mills. In Week 2, Darby collected a season-high eight solo tackles, made a pass deflection, and intercepted a pass attempt by Ryan Fitzpatrick to tight end O. J. Howard during a 21–27 loss at the Tampa Bay Buccaneers. On October 11, 2018, Darby made two solo tackles and set a season-high with four pass deflections during a 31–13 victory at the New York Giants. In Week 10, Darby had five combined tackles (three solo) before exiting in the third quarter of a 20–37 loss to the Dallas Cowboys after suffering and injury while covering wide receiver Amari Cooper. On November 12, 2018, Eagles' head coach Doug Pederson announced that Darby had suffered a torn ACL and would miss the remainder of the 2018 NFL season. On November 17, 2018, the Eagles officially placed him on injured reserve and he remained inactive for the last seven games (Weeks 11–17) of the season. He finished with 43 combined tackles (39 solo), 12 passes defended, and one interception in nine games and nine starts. Pro Football Focus had Darby finish the 2018 NFL season with an overall grade of 67.5.

==== 2019 ====
On March 15, 2019, the Philadelphia Eagles signed Darby to a one–year, $6.50 million contract extension that included $4.50 million guaranteed upon signing and an initial signing bonus of $3.50 million.

He entered training camp on the PUP list, but was able to eventually return to practice and compete for a starting role against Sidney Jones, Jalen Mills, Avonte Maddox, Rasul Douglas, and Cre'Von LeBlanc. Head coach Doug Pederson named Darby and Avonte Maddox the starting cornerbacks to begin the regular season.

On September 15, 2019, Darby made three combined tackles (two solo), set a season-high with three pass deflections, and intercepted a pass by Matt Ryan to wide receiver Julio Jones during a 24–20 loss at the Atlanta Falcons. The following week, he collected a season-high six solo tackles before he exited during the third quarter of a 24–27 loss against the Detroit Lions after injuring his hamstring. His hamstring injury subsequently sidelined him for the next four games (Weeks 4–7). In Week 13, Darby made three solo tackles, one pass deflection, and intercepted a pass by Ryan Fitzpatrick to wide receiver DeVante Parker on the first drive of a 37–31 loss against the Miami Dolphins. On December 24, 2019, the Eagles officially placed Darby on injured reserve after he was injured with a hip flexor. He was inactive for the Eagles' 34–17 win at the New York Giants in Week 17. He finished the 2019 NFL season with 37 combined tackles (34 solo), 11 pass breakups, and two interceptions in 11 games and 11 starts. He received an overall grade of 45.9 from Pro Football Focus, marking the lowest grade of his entire career.

=== Washington Football Team ===
==== 2020 ====
On March 29, 2020, the Washington Redskins signed Darby to a one–year, $3 million contract that includes a signing bonus of $1 million. He entered training camp projected to be a starting cornerback following the departures of Josh Norman and Aaron Colvin. Head coach Ron Rivera named Darby a starting cornerback to begin the season and paired him with Kendall Fuller.

In Week 9, Darby collected a season-high seven combined tackles (six solo) during a 20–23 loss against the New York Giants. On November 22, 2020, Darby recorded six combined tackles (five solo), set a season-high with four pass deflections, and had a fumble recovery during a 20–9 victory against the Cincinnati Bengals. He started all 16 games during the 2020 NFL season and finished with a total of 55 combined tackles (43 solo), 16 pass deflections, and one fumble recovery. He received an overall grade of 69.8 from Pro Football Focus in 2020.

=== Denver Broncos ===
==== 2021 ====
On March 15, 2021, the Denver Broncos signed Darby to a three–year, $30.00 million contract that includes $19.50 million guaranteed upon signing and a signing bonus of $9.00 million. He entered training camp projected to be a starting cornerback under defensive coordinator Ed Donatell. Head coach Vic Fangio named Darby a starting cornerback to begin the season and paired him with Kyle Fuller, older brother of Kendall Fuller who he had started alongside in 2020.

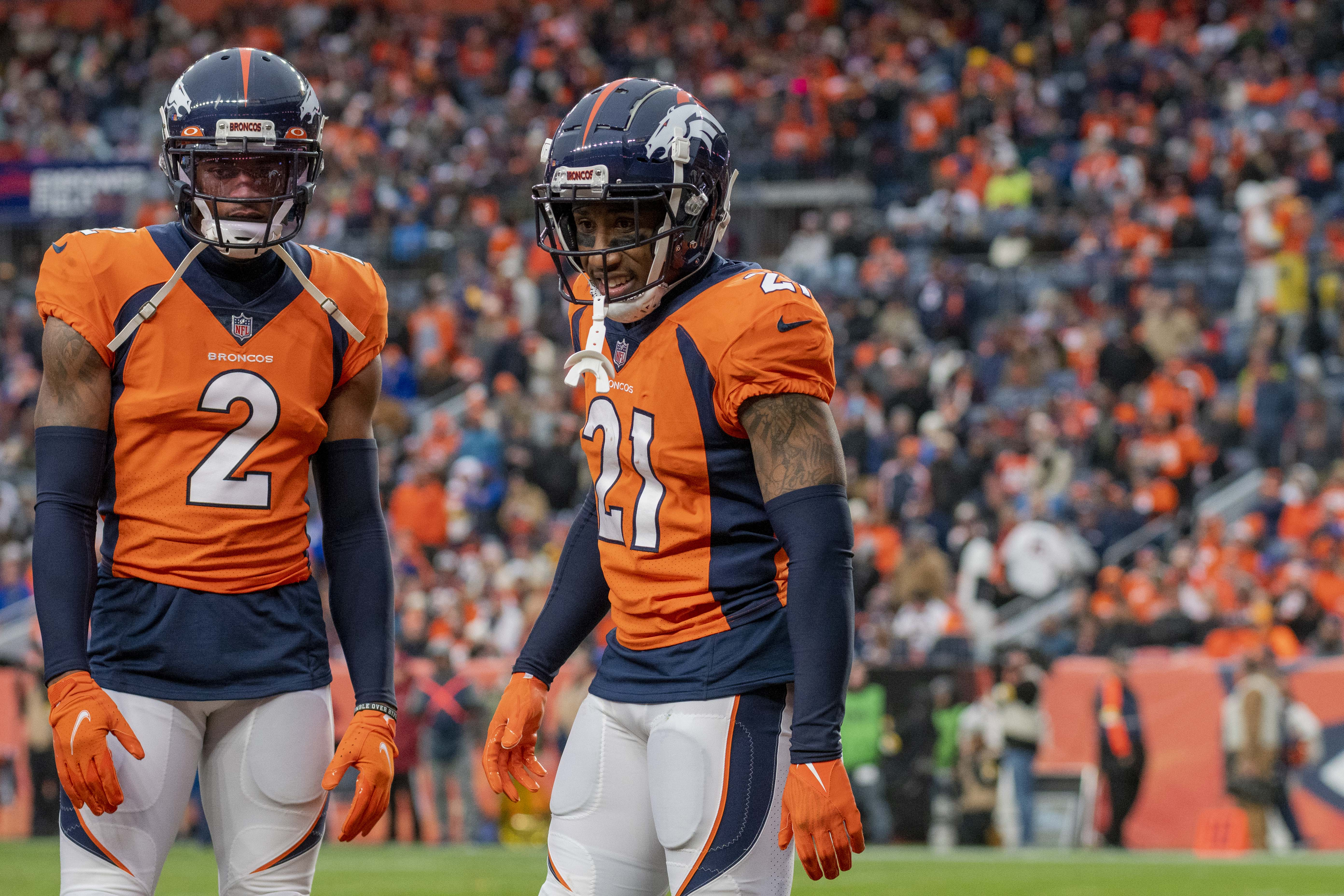
Darby (right) playing for the Broncos in 2021.

On September 12, 2021, Darby made his Denver Broncos debut in their season-opener at the New York Giants and made six solo tackles and a pass deflection before suffering and injuring on the final drive of their 27–13 victory. On September 14, 2021, the Broncos officially placed him on injured reserve due to a hamstring injury. On October 9, 2021, he was added back to the active roster after missing four games (Weeks 2–5). On October 21, 2021, he collected a season-high eight combined tackles (six solo) as the Broncos lost 17–14 at the Cleveland Browns. He was inactive for the final two games (Weeks 17–18) of the season due to a shoulder injury. He finished the 2021 NFL season with a total of 53 combined tackles (42 solo) and six pass deflections in 11 games and 11 starts. He received an overall grade of 89.4 from Pro Football Focus, which ranked sixth amongst all qualifying cornerbacks in 2021.

==== 2022 ====
On January 27, 2022, the Denver Broncos hired Green Bay Packers' offensive coordinator Nathaniel Hackett as their new head coach after the team parted ways with former head coach Vic Fangio following a 7–10 record in 2021. Head coach Nathaniel Hackett named Darby a starting cornerback to begin the season and paired him with Patrick Surtain II.

On September 12, 2022, he started in the Denver Broncos' season-opener at the Seattle Seahawks and collected a season-high six combined tackles (five solo) and broke up a pass as they lost 16–17. In Week 5, Darby had two solo tackles and a pass deflection before he suffered an injury and exited during the second quarter of a 9–12 overtime loss to the Indianapolis Colts. On October 10, 2022, the Broncos officially placed him on injured reserve after he suffered a torn ACL and was inactive for the last 12 games (Weeks 6–18) of the season. He finished the season with only 14 combined tackles (12 solo) and three pass deflections in five games and five starts. Pro Football Focus had him receive an overall grade of 71.1 in 2022.

==== 2023 ====
On March 14, 2023, the Denver Broncos officially released Darby.

=== Baltimore Ravens ===
On August 17, 2023, the Baltimore Ravens signed Darby to a one–year, $1.70 million contract that includes a signing bonus of $500,000. He was signed after No. 1 starting cornerback Marlon Humphrey suffered a foot injury that would require surgery.

Upon his arrival at training camp, he competed for a role as the No. 1 starting cornerback against Rock Ya-Sin and Brandon Stephens under defensive coordinator Mike Macdonald. Head coach John Harbaugh named him a starting cornerback to begin the season, alongside Brandon Stephens.

On September 10, 2023, Darby made his Ravens' debut in their home-opener against the Houston Texans and collected a season-high seven combined tackles (six solo) and made one pass deflection as they won 25–9. He started the first four games before being demoted to a backup cornerback upon Marlon Humphrey's return in Week 5. In Week 11, Darby set a season-high with three pass deflections during a 34–20 victory against the Cincinnati Bengals. He was inactive during a 10–17 loss against the Pittsburgh Steelers in Week 18 due to an illness. He finished the season with 28 combined tackles (24 solo) and seven pass deflections in 16 games and seven starts. He received an overall grade of 81.0 from Pro Football Focus in 2023.

=== Jacksonville Jaguars ===
==== 2024 ====
On March 11, 2024, the Jacksonville Jaguars signed Darby to a two–year, $8.50 million contract that includes $5.50 million guaranteed upon signing and an initial signing bonus of $3.00 million. He was reunited with former Philadelphia Eagles' head coach Doug Pederson. He entered training camp slated as a starting cornerback under defensive coordinator Ryan Nielsen. Head coach Doug Pederson named him a starting cornerback to begin the season and paired him with Tyson Campbell.

On October 13, 2024, Darby collected a season-high eight combined tackles (six solo) as the Jaguars lost 16–35 at the Chicago Bears. On December 16, 2024, Jaguars' head coach Doug Pederson announced his decision to bench Darby in favor of replacing him with Montaric Brown. He finished the 2024 NFL season with 46 combined tackles (36 solo) and nine pass deflections in 13 games and 12 starts. He received an overall grade of 60.3 from Pro Football Focus in 2024.

==== 2025 ====
On January 24, 2025, the Jacksonville Jaguars hired Tampa Bay Buccaneers' offensive coordinator Liam Coen to be their new head coach after they fired Doug Pederson following a 4–13 record during the 2024 NFL season. On March 12, 2025, the Jacksonville Jaguars officially released Darby.

=== Houston Texans ===
On March 17, 2025, the Houston Texans signed Darby to a one-year, $2.50 million contract.

On June 2, 2025, Darby announced his retirement from professional football.

== NFL career statistics ==
Legend
**Bold**	Career high

=== Regular season ===
Year	Team	Games		Tackles				Fumbles				Interceptions					
Year	Team	GP	GS	Cmb	Solo	Ast	Sck	FF	FR	Yds	TD	PD	Int	Yds	Avg	Lng	TD
2015	BUF	15	15	68	**61**	7	0.0	0	0	0	0	**21**	2	**48**	**24.0**	27	0
2016	BUF	14	14	**69**	60	9	0.0	0	0	0	0	12	0	0	0	0	0
2017	PHI	8	7	34	30	4	0.0	0	0	0	0	9	**3**	42	14.0	**37**	0
2018	PHI	9	9	43	39	4	0.0	0	0	0	0	12	1	16	16.0	16	0
2019	PHI	11	11	37	34	3	0.0	0	0	0	0	11	2	29	14.5	16	0
2020	WAS	**16**	**16**	55	43	**12**	0.0	0	**1**	0	0	14	0	0	0.0	0	0
2021	DEN	11	11	53	42	11	0.0	0	0	0	0	6	0	0	0.0	0	0
2022	DEN	5	5	14	12	2	0.0	**1**	0	0	0	3	0	0	0.0	0	0
2023	BAL	**16**	7	28	24	4	0.0	0	0	0	0	7	0	0	0.0	0	0
2024	JAX	13	12	46	36	10	0.0	0	0	0	0	9	0	0	0.0	0	0
Career		108	98	414	355	59	0.0	1	1	0	0	99	8	135	16.9	37	0

=== Postseason ===
Year	Team	Games		Tackles				Fumbles				Interceptions					
Year	Team	GP	GS	Cmb	Solo	Ast	Sck	FF	FR	Yds	TD	PD	Int	Yds	Avg	Lng	TD
2017	PHI	**3**	**3**	**18**	**16**	2	0.0	0	0	0	0	**6**	0	0	0	0	0
2018	PHI	Did not play due to injury															
2019	PHI	Did not play due to injury															
2020	WAS	1	1	5	2	**3**	0.0	0	0	0	0	1	0	0	0.0	0	0
2023	BAL	2	2	7	6	1	0.0	**1**	0	0	0	2	0	0	0.0	0	0
Career		6	6	30	24	6	0.0	1	0	0	0	9	0	0	0.0	28	0
