= 2012 World Junior Championships in Athletics – Men's 4 × 100 metres relay =

The men's 4 × 100 metres relay at the 2012 World Junior Championships in Athletics was held at the Estadi Olímpic Lluís Companys on 13 and 14 July.

== Medalists ==
Gold	Silver	Bronze
United States; Tyreek Hill; Aldrich Bailey; Arthur Delaney; Aaron Ernest	Jamaica; Tyquendo Tracey; Odean Skeen; Jevaughn Minzie; Jazeel Murphy	Japan; Kazuma Oseto; Akiyuki Hashimoto; Aska Cambridge; Kazuki Kanamori

== Records ==
Prior to the competition, the existing world junior and championship records were as follows.

World Junior Record & Championship Record	United States (Trell Kimmons, Abidemi Omole, Ivory Williams, LaShawn Merritt)	38.66	Grosseto, Italy	18 July 2004
World Junior Leading	Japan (Kazuma Oseto, Akiyuki Hashimoto, Tatsuro Suwa, Kazuki Kanamori)	39.16	Fukuroi, Japan	3 May 2012
Broken records during the 2012 World Junior Championships in Athletics
World Junior Leading	United States (Tyreek Hill, Aldrich Bailey, Arthur Delaney, Aaron Ernest)	38.67	Barcelona, Spain	14 July 2012

== Results ==
=== Heats ===
Qualification: First 2 of each heat (Q) plus the 2 fastest times (q) qualified

Rank	Heat	Lane	Nation	Athletes	Time	Notes
1	1	8	Japan	Kazuma Oseto, Akiyuki Hashimoto, Aska Cambridge, Kazuki Kanamori	39.01	Q, WJL
2	3	4	Great Britain	Emmanuel Stephens, Chijindu Ujah, Thomas Holligan, Adam Gemili	39.09	Q, SB
3	3	5	Jamaica	Jevaughn Minzie, Odean Skeen, Senoj-Jay Givans, Jazeel Murphy	39.19	Q, SB
4	2	6	United States	Cameron Burrell, Aldrich Bailey, Arman Hall, Arthur Delaney	39.25	Q, SB
5	1	4	Brazil	Leandro de Araújo, Yuri Monteiro, Renato dos Santos Junior, Rodrigo Rocha	39.29	Q, AJ
6	1	7	Poland	Kamil Bijowski, Przemysław Słowikowski, Karol Zalewski, Adam Jabłoński	39.31	q, NJ
7	1	9	Australia	Ben Jaworski, Hugh Donovan, Nicholas Hough, Matthew Bertacco	39.34	q, AJ
8	2	7	Bahamas	Anthony Farrington, Blake Bartlett, Shane Jones, Stephen Newbold	39.48	Q, NJ
9	1	6	Thailand	Ruttanapon Sowan, Kritsada Namsuwan, Jaran Sathoengram, Jirapong Meenapra	39.68	SB
10	1	5	Nigeria	Chukwudike Harry, Okeudo Jonathan Nmaju, Mamus Emuobonuvie, Martins Ogierakhia	39.86	SB
11	1	3	South Africa	Angus Julies, Siphelo Ngquboza, Pieter Conradie, Fana Mofokeng	39.87	SB
12	2	9	Trinidad and Tobago	Jesse Berkley, Jonathan Holder, Ashron Sobers, Jonathan Farinha	40.01	
13	2	3	Germany	Robert Polkowski, Patrick Domogala, Maximilian Ruth, Jonas Lohmann	40.08	SB
14	2	8	Italy	Alessandro Pino, Fausto Desalu, Giacomo Tortu, Giovanni Galbieri	40.41	SB
15	3	4	Canada	Devon Rittinger, Drelan Bramwell, Mobolade Ajomale, Calvin Arsenault	40.58	SB
16	2	5	Denmark	Morten Dalgaard Madsen, Andreas Trajkovski, Emil Strom, Frederik Thomsen	40.60	NJ
17	3	6	Spain	Adrián Pérez, Daniel Mazón, Óscar Husillos, Rodrigo De la Oliva	41.08	SB
18	3	7	Bahrain	Husain Mohamed Hasan, Ahmed Mohamed Alshawoosh, Husain Sameer Mubarak, Ali Omar Abdulla Al Doseri	41.09	
	3	8	France	Guy-Elphège Anouman, Pierre Chalus, Mickael-Meba Zeze, Ken Romain	DQ	
	3	3	Switzerland	Brahian Peña, Yanier Bello, Silvan Wicki, Bastien Mouthon	DQ	
	2	4	Finland	Miika Wynne-Ellis, Markus Koivula, Samuli Lehtinen, Eetu Rantala	DQ	
	3	2	Czech Republic	Marek Bakalár, Michal Desensky, Jan Jirka, Zdenek Stromšík	DQ	

=== Final ===
Rank	Lane	Nation	Athletes	Time	Notes
1st place, gold medalist(s)	6	United States	Tyreek Hill, Aldrich Bailey, Arthur Delaney, Aaron Ernest	38.67	WJL
2nd place, silver medalist(s)	5	Jamaica	Tyquendo Tracey, Odean Skeen, Jevaughn Minzie, Jazeel Murphy	38.97	NJ
3rd place, bronze medalist(s)	4	Japan	Kazuma Oseto, Akiyuki Hashimoto, Aska Cambridge, Kazuki Kanamori	39.02	
4	2	Poland	Kamil Bijowski, Przemysław Słowikowski, Karol Zalewski, Adam Jabłoński	39.47	
5	3	Australia	Ben Jaworski, Hugh Donovan, Nicholas Hough, Matthew Bertacco	39.59	
6	8	Bahamas	Blake Bartlett, Teray Smith, Shane Jones, Stephen Newbold	39.74	
7	9	Brazil	Leandro de Araújo, Yuri Monteiro, Renato dos Santos Junior, Rodrigo Rocha	39.75	
	7	Great Britain	Emmanuel Stephens, Chijindu Ujah, David Bolarinwa, Adam Gemili	DNF	

== Participation ==
According to an unofficial count, 93 athletes from 22 countries participated in the event.

- Australia (4)
- Bahamas (5)
- Bahrain (4)
- Brazil (4)
- Canada (4)
- Czech Republic (4)
- Denmark (4)
- Finland (4)
- France (4)
- Germany (4)
- Italy (4)
- Jamaica (5)
- Japan (4)
- Nigeria (4)
- Poland (4)
- South Africa (4)
- Spain (4)
- Switzerland (4)
- Thailand (4)
- Trinidad and Tobago (4)
- United Kingdom (5)
- United States (6)
