= 2011 World Youth Championships in Athletics – Boys' 100 metres =

Boys' 100 metres at the 2011 World Youth Championships in Athletics
- Venue: Stadium Lille Métropole
- Dates: 6 July (heats); 7 July (semifinal & final)
- Competitors: 96
- Winning time: 10.51 PB

Medalists
gold medal	Odail Todd	Jamaica
silver medal	Kazuma Oseto	Japan
bronze medal	Méba-Mickaël Zeze	France

The boys' 100 metres at the 2011 World Youth Championships in Athletics was held at the Stadium Lille Métropole on 6 and 7 July. The event was won by Odail Todd of Jamaica, who was only drafted into the event after World Youth leader Jazeel Murphy was forced to withdraw due to injury. Odean Skeen, the 2010 Youth Olympic 100 m champion, also had to withdraw prior to the event.

== Medalists ==
Gold	Silver	Bronze
Odail Todd; Jamaica	Kazuma Oseto; Japan	Méba-Mickaël Zeze; France

== Records ==
Prior to the competition, the following records were as follows.

World Youth Best	Rynell Parson (USA)	10.23	Indianapolis, United States	21 June 2007
Championship Record	Darrel Brown (TRI)	10.31	Debrecen, Hungary	13 July 2001
World Youth Leading	Jazeel Murphy (JAM)	10.27	Montego Bay, Jamaica	23 April 2011

No new records were set during the competition.

== Heats ==
Qualification rule: first 2 of each heat (Q) qualified.

=== Heat 1 ===
Rank	Lane	Name	Nationality	Time	Notes
1	8	Odail Todd	Jamaica	10.70	Q
2	3	Mohammed Sico Ibrahim	Saudi Arabia	10.79	Q, PB
3	5	Chukwudike Harry	Nigeria	10.90	
4	7	Yan Lam Chan	Hong Kong	10.96	
5	4	Waisele Ledua	Fiji	11.04	
6	6	Luka Šakota	Croatia	11.05	PB
7	1	Ondrej Lengyel	Slovakia	11.35	
8	2	Mamadou Bah	Guinea	11.83	PB

=== Heat 2 ===
Rank	Lane	Name	Nationality	Time	Notes
1	2	Jarrod Geddes	Australia	10.66	Q, PB
2	6	Chijindu Ujah	Great Britain	10.77	Q
3	5	Jeneko Place	Bermuda	10.88	SB
4	8	Zhang Mingming	China	10.95	
5	4	Misael Rivera	Venezuela	11.06	PB
6	7	Péter Csuhai	Hungary	11.13	
7	3	Viktor Šarnjai	Serbia	11.50	
8	1	Vitalii Karnaukhov	Kyrgyzstan	11.54	PB

=== Heat 3 ===
Rank	Lane	Name	Nationality	Time	Notes
1	3	Kazuya Tsukamoto	Japan	10.79	Q
2	2	Tommey Outten	Bahamas	11.00	Q
3	6	Humod Ali Al Wani	Saudi Arabia	11.00	
4	4	Flavio Lucena	Brazil	11.04	
5	5	Jean-Yves Esparon	Seychelles	11.36	
6	1	Julien Miguel Meunier	Mauritius	11.57	
7	8	Daniel Philimon	Vanuatu	12.23	PB
-	7	César Holguín	Dominican Republic	DNS	

=== Heat 4 ===
Rank	Lane	Name	Nationality	Time	Notes
1	2	Delano Davis	Bahamas	10.95	Q
2	6	Bradley Britz	South Africa	10.96	Q
3	7	Giovanni Cellario	Italy	10.99	
4	3	Zong Tang Yan	Singapore	11.07	
5	5	Alexandr Kasper	Kazakhstan	11.42	
6	1	Brian Thomas	Grenada	11.54	
7	8	Enoka Kirata	Kiribati	12.31	PB
8	4	Sajith De Silva	Sri Lanka	14.19	

=== Heat 5 ===
Rank	Lane	Name	Nationality	Time	Notes
1	7	Tahir Walsh	Antigua and Barbuda	10.73	Q
2	8	Deon Hope	Barbados	10.91	Q
3	4	Sebastián Acevedo	Argentina	11.04	
4	6	Rait Veesalu	Estonia	11.13	
5	3	Ioan Pitigoi	Romania	11.15	
6	2	Jonathan Oliver Permal	Mauritius	11.28	
7	1	Mahamadou Diane	Mali	11.44	PB
8	5	José-Nguema Nsue	Equatorial Guinea	12.66	PB

=== Heat 6 ===
Rank	Lane	Name	Nationality	Time	Notes
1	2	Ronald Darby	United States	10.67	Q
2	5	Gautier Dautremer	France	10.84	Q
3	1	Kritsada Namsuwan	Thailand	10.92	
4	6	Henrik Overvåg	Norway	11.05	
5	8	Sergey Rassadnikov	Kazakhstan	11.14	
6	7	Orlando Gbahi	Ivory Coast	11.24	
7	3	Shaguoy Stephens	British Virgin Islands	11.25	
-	4	James Chutaro	Marshall Islands	DQ	

=== Heat 7 ===
Rank	Lane	Name	Nationality	Time	Notes
1	4	Méba-Mickaël Zeze	France	10.78	Q
2	8	Sapwaturrahman	Indonesia	10.98	Q
3	6	Aykut Ay	Turkey	10.99	
4	7	Zenebe Madfu	Ethiopia	11.08	PB
5	1	Scott Clarke	Bermuda	11.08	PB
6	3	Rihards Parandjuks	Latvia	11.31	
7	5	Mihai Petrescu	Romania	11.32	
8	2	Juan Carlos López	Bolivia	11.62	

=== Heat 8 ===
Rank	Lane	Name	Nationality	Time	Notes
1	1	Baban Bahaaldin Hasan	Iraq	10.81	Q
2	2	Sergeal Petersen	South Africa	10.87	Q
3	6	César Ramírez	Mexico	11.01	SB
3	7	Furkan Sen	Turkey	11.01	
5	4	Daniel Engen Lauritzen	Norway	11.07	
6	3	Ahmed Mohamed Alshawoosh	Bahrain	11.31	PB
7	8	Jorge Óscar Caracassis	Argentina	11.40	
8	5	Sargis Kostandyan	Armenia	11.60	

=== Heat 9 ===
Rank	Lane	Name	Nationality	Time	Notes
1	6	Andre Azonwanna	Canada	10.70	Q
2	7	Hasanain Hasan Zubaiyen	Iraq	10.89	Q, PB
3	2	Ruttanapon Sowan	Thailand	10.93	
4	3	Lorenzo Bilotti	Italy	11.00	
5	8	Oleg Polovytsya	Ukraine	11.22	
6	1	Lukáš Mészáros	Slovakia	11.49	
7	5	Ansley Cooper	Liberia	11.67	PB
8	4	Alford Dyett	Montserrat	12.03	

=== Heat 10 ===
Rank	Lane	Name	Nationality	Time	Notes
1	5	Hugh Donovan	Australia	10.60	Q, PB
2	1	Wesley Best	Canada	10.83	Q
3	2	Minsuk Choi	South Korea	10.96	
4	3	Carlos Nascimento	Portugal	10.98	
5	4	Volodymyr Suprun	Ukraine	10.99	PB
6	7	Renato dos Santos Junior	Brazil	10.99	
7	8	Husain Sameer Mubarak	Bahrain	11.45	PB
8	6	Abdulrazaq Al Mutairi	Kuwait	11.65	

=== Heat 11 ===
Rank	Lane	Name	Nationality	Time	Notes
1	1	Marek Bakalár	Czech Republic	10.79	Q
2	3	Dmitriy Sychev	Russia	10.87	Q
3	5	Cejhae Greene	Antigua and Barbuda	10.94	PB
4	7	Mamus Emuobonuvie	Nigeria	11.09	
5	8	Hamza Bendoukkalia	Morocco	11.42	
6	6	Haitham Al Saadi	Oman	11.60	
7	4	Dave Prosper	Haiti	11.80	PB
8	2	Ramón Marcía	Honduras	12.87	PB

=== Heat 12 ===
Rank	Lane	Name	Nationality	Time	Notes
1	1	Kazuma Oseto	Japan	10.65	Q
2	6	Zhiyuan Donovan Chan	Singapore	11.03	Q
3	8	Luka Žontar	Slovenia	11.10	
4	2	Juan Carlos Alanis	Mexico	11.24	
5	4	Khuphukile Jamaine Chilufya	Zimbabwe	11.35	PB
6	3	Jijin Vijayan	India	11.38	
7	5	Nicholas Hughes	Anguilla	11.84	
-	7	Erik Hagberg	Sweden	DNF	

== Semifinals ==
Qualification rule: first 2 of each heat (Q) plus the 2 fastest times (q) qualified.

=== Heat 1 ===
Rank	Lane	Name	Nationality	Time	Notes
1	6	Hugh Donovan	Australia	10.83	Q
2	7	Chijindu Ujah	Great Britain	10.88	Q
3	3	Andre Azonwanna	Canada	10.88	
4	4	Tahir Walsh	Antigua and Barbuda	10.94	
5	2	Hasanain Hasan Zubaiyen	Iraq	11.09	
6	8	Dmitriy Sychev	Russia	11.14	
7	5	Delano Davis	Bahamas	11.15	
8	1	Zhiyuan Donovan Chan	Singapore	11.30	

=== Heat 2 ===
Rank	Lane	Name	Nationality	Time	Notes
1	6	Jarrod Geddes	Australia	10.76	Q
2	4	Ronald Darby	United States	10.81	Q, PB
3	5	Marek Bakalár	Czech Republic	10.84	
4	3	Kazuya Tsukamoto	Japan	10.92	
5	7	Gautier Dautremer	France	11.00	
6	8	Wesley Best	Canada	11.00	
7	2	Sapwaturrahman	Indonesia	11.01	
-	1	Bradley Britz	South Africa	DNS	

=== Heat 3 ===
Rank	Lane	Name	Nationality	Time	Notes
1	3	Odail Todd	Jamaica	10.67	Q, PB
2	4	Méba-Mickaël Zeze	France	10.69	Q
3	6	Kazuma Oseto	Japan	10.75	q
4	8	Mohammad Sico Ibrahim	Saudi Arabia	10.78	q, PB
5	7	Sergeal Petersen	South Africa	10.89	
6	5	Baban Bahaaldin Hasan	Iraq	10.97	
7	2	Deon Hope	Barbados	11.06	
8	1	Tommey Outten	Bahamas	11.15	

== Final ==
Rank	Lane	Name	Nationality	Time	Notes
1st place, gold medalist(s)	5	Odail Todd	Jamaica	10.51	PB
2nd place, silver medalist(s)	1	Kazuma Oseto	Japan	10.52	
3rd place, bronze medalist(s)	4	Méba-Mickaël Zeze	France	10.57	
4	8	Ronald Darby	United States	10.61	PB
5	6	Hugh Donovan	Australia	10.62	
6	3	Jarrod Geddes	Australia	10.63	PB
7	2	Mohammad Sico Ibrahim	Saudi Arabia	10.63	PB
8	7	Chijindu Ujah	Great Britain	10.69	
