= 2011 World Youth Championships in Athletics – Boys' 400 metres =

Boys' 400 metres at the 2011 World Youth Championships in Athletics
- Venue: Stadium Lille Métropole
- Dates: 6 July (heats); 7 July (semifinal); 8 July (final)
- Competitors: 55
- Winning time: 46.01 WYL

Medalists
gold medal	Arman Hall	United States
silver medal	Alphas Kishoyian	Kenya
bronze medal	Patryk Dobek	Poland

The boys' 400 metres at the 2011 World Youth Championships in Athletics was held at the Stadium Lille Métropole on 6, 7 and 8 July.

== Medalists ==
Gold	Silver	Bronze
Arman Hall; United States	Alphas Kishoyian; Kenya	Patryk Dobek; Poland

== Records ==
Prior to the competition, the following records were as follows.

World Youth Best	Obea Moore (USA)	45.14	Santiago, Chile	2 September 1995
Championship Record	Kirani James (GRN)	45.24	Brixen, Italy	10 July 2009
World Youth Leading	Arman Hall (USA)	46.22	Winter Park, United States	7 May 2011

During the competition, Arman Hall lowered his own world youth-leading 46.22 to post the second-fastest in championship history, 46.01.

== Heats ==
Qualification rule: first 3 of each heat (Q) plus the 3 fastest times (q) qualified.

=== Heat 1 ===
Rank	Lane	Name	Nationality	Time	Notes
1	7	Machel Cedenio	Trinidad and Tobago	47.32	Q
2	3	Shotaro Akiyo	Japan	47.74	Q
3	6	Pieter Conradie	South Africa	47.83	Q
4	8	José de Jesús Fraire	Mexico	48.67	q
5	4	Sibongakonke Matsenjwa	Swaziland	48.73	PB
6	2	Mohamedine Mahamadou	Niger	48.78	PB
7	1	Maykon Pedro da Cunha	Brazil	49.32	PB
8	5	Mohmmed Al Shueili	Oman	49.50	

=== Heat 2 ===
Rank	Lane	Name	Nationality	Time	Notes
1	2	Thomas Jordier	France	47.89	Q, PB
2	4	David Kipkemoi Chemjor	Kenya	48.15	Q
3	3	Mateo Ružić	Croatia	48.39	Q
4	5	Samvel Grigoryan	Armenia	49.64	PB
5	8	Zied Aissa	Tunisia	49.72	
6	6	Lennox Williams	Jamaica	50.01	
7	1	George Manebona	Solomon Islands	51.65	SB
-	7	Japhet Samuel	Nigeria	DQ	

=== Heat 3 ===
Rank	Lane	Name	Nationality	Time	Notes
1	6	Sadam Koumi	Sudan	47.59	Q
2	4	Dongbaek Choi	South Korea	47.87	Q, SB
3	2	Carlos Eduardo Grachet	Brazil	48.20	Q
4	5	Jack Sheridan	Australia	48.48	q
5	8	Sondre Nyvold Lid	Norway	48.86	
6	1	Attila Farkas	Hungary	49.77	
7	3	Jordan Geenen	France	49.96	
8	7	Abdelkhedere Abdelbassit Abdelrahmane	Chad	51.54	PB

=== Heat 4 ===
Rank	Lane	Name	Nationality	Time	Notes
1	4	Najee Glass	United States	47.92	Q
2	1	Patryk Dobek	Poland	48.13	Q
3	7	Timofey Chalyy	Russia	48.49	Q
4	5	Oleksiy Pozdnyakov	Ukraine	48.92	PB
5	3	Nathaniel George	Canada	49.90	
6	6	Sandeep -	India	49.94	
7	8	Sergi Torres	Spain	51.42	
8	2	Omar Alkhatib	Palestine	54.93	PB

=== Heat 5 ===
Rank	Lane	Name	Nationality	Time	Notes
1	3	Arman Hall	United States	46.76	Q
2	2	Brendon Restall	Canada	47.31	Q, PB
3	7	Lorenzo Adams	South Africa	48.05	Q
4	5	Basheer Atiah Al Barakati	Saudi Arabia	49.42	
5	1	Jørgen Kåshagen	Norway	50.34	
6	6	Ever Carranza	Mexico	50.60	
7	4	Jatin Jain	India	54.03	

=== Heat 6 ===
Rank	Lane	Name	Nationality	Time	Notes
1	6	Jarryd Buchan	Australia	47.12	Q, PB
2	7	Takuya Fukunaga	Japan	47.24	Q, PB
3	1	Alphas Kishoyian	Kenya	47.31	Q
4	5	Rafał Smoleń	Poland	48.04	q, PB
5	4	Lucas Búa	Spain	49.04	
6	3	Miloš Raović	Serbia	49.07	PB
7	2	Lahiru Jamuni	Sri Lanka	49.26	PB
-	8	Aleksandr Lukyanenko	Turkmenistan	DQ	

=== Heat 7 ===
Rank	Lane	Name	Nationality	Time	Notes
1	5	Alex Boyce	Great Britain	47.82	Q, PB
2	8	Andre Wells	Bahamas	47.87	Q
3	3	Ahmed Yahya Al Khayri	Saudi Arabia	48.78	Q, PB
4	4	Nitipol Thongpoon	Thailand	49.72	
5	1	Bariadora Friday Tamunosia	Nigeria	49.97	
6	7	Dónald Arias	Costa Rica	50.25	
7	6	Usama Al-Gheilani	Oman	54.25	
-	2	Bernardo Baloyes	Colombia	DQ	

== Semifinals ==
Qualification rule: first 2 of each heat (Q) plus the 2 fastest times (q) qualified.

=== Heat 1 ===
Rank	Lane	Name	Nationality	Time	Notes
1	6	Takuya Fukunaga	Japan	47.30	Q
2	3	Andre Wells	Bahamas	47.36	Q
3	4	Najee Glass	United States	47.42	
4	5	Jarryd Buchan	Australia	47.53	
5	8	David Kipkemoi Chemjor	Kenya	47.90	
6	7	Lorenzo Adams	South Africa	48.01	
7	1	Timofey Chalyy	Russia	48.45	
8	2	José de Jesús Fraire	Mexico	49.60	

=== Heat 2 ===
Rank	Lane	Name	Nationality	Time	Notes
1	6	Arman Hall	United States	46.70	Q
2	7	Patryk Dobek	Poland	47.19	Q, PB
3	3	Thomas Jordier	France	47.27	PB
4	8	Carlos Eduardo Grachet	Brazil	47.58	PB
5	4	Alex Boyce	Great Britain	47.96	
6	5	Dongbaek Choi	South Korea	48.18	
7	1	Jack Sheridan	Australia	49.39	
8	2	Mateo Ružić	Croatia	50.57	

=== Heat 3 ===
Rank	Lane	Name	Nationality	Time	Notes
1	8	Alphas Kishoyian	Kenya	46.52	Q
2	6	Sadam Koumi	Sudan	47.08	Q
3	4	Machel Cedenio	Trinidad and Tobago	47.12	q
4	3	Brendon Restall	Canada	47.26	q, PB
5	5	Shotaro Aikyo	Japan	47.42	PB
6	7	Pieter Conradie	South Africa	47.58	
7	2	Ahmed Yahya Al Khayri	Saudi Arabia	48.57	
	1	Rafał Smoleń	Poland	DQ	

== Final ==
Rank	Lane	Name	Nationality	Time	Notes
1st place, gold medalist(s)	4	Arman Hall	United States	46.01	WYL
2nd place, silver medalist(s)	6	Alphas Kishoyian	Kenya	46.58	
3rd place, bronze medalist(s)	8	Patryk Dobek	Poland	46.67	PB
4	2	Machel Cedenio	Trinidad and Tobago	46.89	PB
5	5	Takuya Fukunaga	Japan	47.16	PB
6	7	Andre Wells	Bahamas	47.22	
7	1	Brendon Restall	Canada	47.34	
	3	Sadam Koumi	Sudan	DNF	
