= Kazuma Ōseto =

Japanese sprinter

Kazuma Oseto
Personal information
- Nationality: Japan
- Born: 5 August 1994 (age 31) Kanda, Miyako District, Fukuoka
- Height: 1.79 m (5 ft 10 in)
- Weight: 70 kg (154 lb)

Sport
- Sport: Running
- Event(s): 100 metres, 200 metres
- University team: Hosei University
- Club: Yaskawa Electric Track and field

Achievements and titles
- Personal best(s): 100 m: 10.19 (Hiratsuka 2016); 200 m: 20.55 (Yokohama 2016); 60 m: 6.71 (Osaka 2013)
Medal record
Men's athletics
Representing Japan
World Relays
Bronze medal – third place	2015 Nassau	4×100 m relay
World Junior Championships
Bronze medal – third place	2012 Barcelona	4×100 m relay
World Youth Championships
Silver medal – second place	2011 Lille	100 m
Silver medal – second place	2011 Lille	Medley relay
Summer Universiade
Gold medal – first place	2015 Gwangju	4×100 m relay
Asian Championships
Silver medal – second place	2013 Pune	4×100 m relay
Bronze medal – third place	2015 Wuhan	4×400 m relay
East Asian Games
Gold medal – first place	2013 Tianjin	4×100 m relay
Bronze medal – third place	2013 Tianjin	100 m

Kazuma Ōseto (大瀬戸一馬, Ōseto Kazuma; born 5 August 1994) is a Japanese sprinter.

He won a silver medal in the 100 m at the 2011 World Youth Championships in Athletics, behind Odail Todd.

== Personal bests ==
Event	Time	Wind	Venue	Date
Outdoor
100 m	10.19 s	+1.7 m/s	Hiratsuka, Japan	11 June 2016
200 m	20.55 s	+0.6 m/s	Yokohama, Japan	22 May 2016
Indoor
60 m	6.71 s		Osaka, Japan	2 February 2013

== Records ==
- 100 metres
  - Former Japanese junior and Japanese high school record holder - 10.23 s (wind: +1.3 m/s) (Hiroshima, 29 April 2012)
- 4×100 m relay
  - Current Asian and Japanese junior record holder - 39.01 s (relay leg:1st) (Barcelona, 13 July 2012)^{[a]}
  - Current Japanese university record holder - 38.44 s (relay leg:4th) (Tianjin, 9 October 2013)^{[b]}
  - Current Japanese high school record holder - 39.16 s (relay leg: 1st) (Fukuroi, 3 May 2012)^{[c]}
- Medley relay (100m×200m×300m×400m)
  - Former Japanese youth best holder - 1:50.69 s (relay leg: 1st) (Lille, 10 July 2011)^{[d]}
- 60 metres (Indoor)
  - Former Japanese junior record holder - 6.71 s (Osaka, 2 February 2013)

^{a} with Akiyuki Hashimoto, Asuka Cambridge, and Kazuki Kanamori
^{b} with Ryōta Yamagata, Shōta Iizuka, and Asuka Cambridge
^{c} with Akiyuki Hashimoto, Tatsurō Suwa, and Kazuki Kanamori
^{d} with Akiyuki Hashimoto, Shōtarō Aikyō, and Takuya Fukunaga

== Competition record ==
Year	Competition	Venue	Position	Event	Notes
Representing Japan
2011	World Youth Championships	Lille, France	2nd	100 m	10.52 (wind: -0.3 m/s)
2011	World Youth Championships	Lille, France	2nd	Medley relay	1:50.69 (relay leg: 1st) NYB
2012	World Junior Championships	Barcelona, Spain	16th (sf)	100 m	10.56 (wind: -0.5 m/s)
2012	World Junior Championships	Barcelona, Spain	3rd	4×100 m relay	39.02 (relay leg: 1st)
2013	Asian Championships	Pune, India	2nd	4×100 m relay	39.11 (relay leg: 2nd)
2013	East Asian Games	Tianjin, China	3rd	100 m	10.48 (wind: -0.1 m/s)
2013	East Asian Games	Tianjin, China	1st	4×100 m relay	38.44 (relay leg: 4th) GR, NUR
2014	World Relays	Nassau, Bahamas	5th	4×100 m relay	38.40 (relay leg: 1st)
2014	Continental Cup	Marrakesh, Morocco	4th	4×100 m relay	39.50 (relay leg: 1st)
2015	World Relays	Nassau, Bahamas	3rd	4×100 m relay	38.20 (relay leg: 1st)
2015	Asian Championships	Wuhan, China	9th (sf)	100 m	10.45 (wind: +0.8 m/s)
2015	Asian Championships	Wuhan, China	3rd	4×400 m relay	3:03.47 (relay leg: 3rd)
2015	Universiade	Gwangju, South Korea	1st	4×100 m relay	39.08 (relay leg: 1st)
2015	World Championships	Beijing, China	10th (h)	4×100 m relay	38.60 (relay leg: 1st)

=== National Championship ===
Year	Competition	Venue	Position	Event	Notes
2013	Japan Championships	Chōfu, Tokyo	6th	100 m	10.36 (wind: +0.7 m/s)
2013	Japan Championships	Yokohama, Kanagawa	3rd	4×100 m relay	39.57 (relay leg: 2nd)
2014	Japan Championships	Fukushima, Fukushima	4th	100 m	10.35 (wind: +0.6 m/s)
2014	Japan Championships	Yokohama, Kanagawa	1st	4×100 m relay	38.81 (relay leg: 2nd) GR
2015	Japan Championships	Niigata, Niigata	8th	100 m	10.55 (wind: -0.9 m/s)
2015	Japan Championships	Yokohama, Kanagawa	1st	4×100 m relay	38.79 (relay leg: 2nd) GR
2016	Japan Championships	Nagoya, Aichi	4th	100 m	10.41 (wind: -0.3 m/s)
2016	Japan Championships	Nagoya, Aichi	5th	200 m	20.72 (wind: +1.8 m/s)
2016	Japan Championships	Yokohama, Kanagawa	1st	4×100 m relay	38.89 (relay leg: 2nd)
2017	Japan Championships	Osaka, Osaka	25th (h)	100 m	10.55 (wind: -0.6 m/s)
