= Sapwaturrahman =

Indonesian long jumper

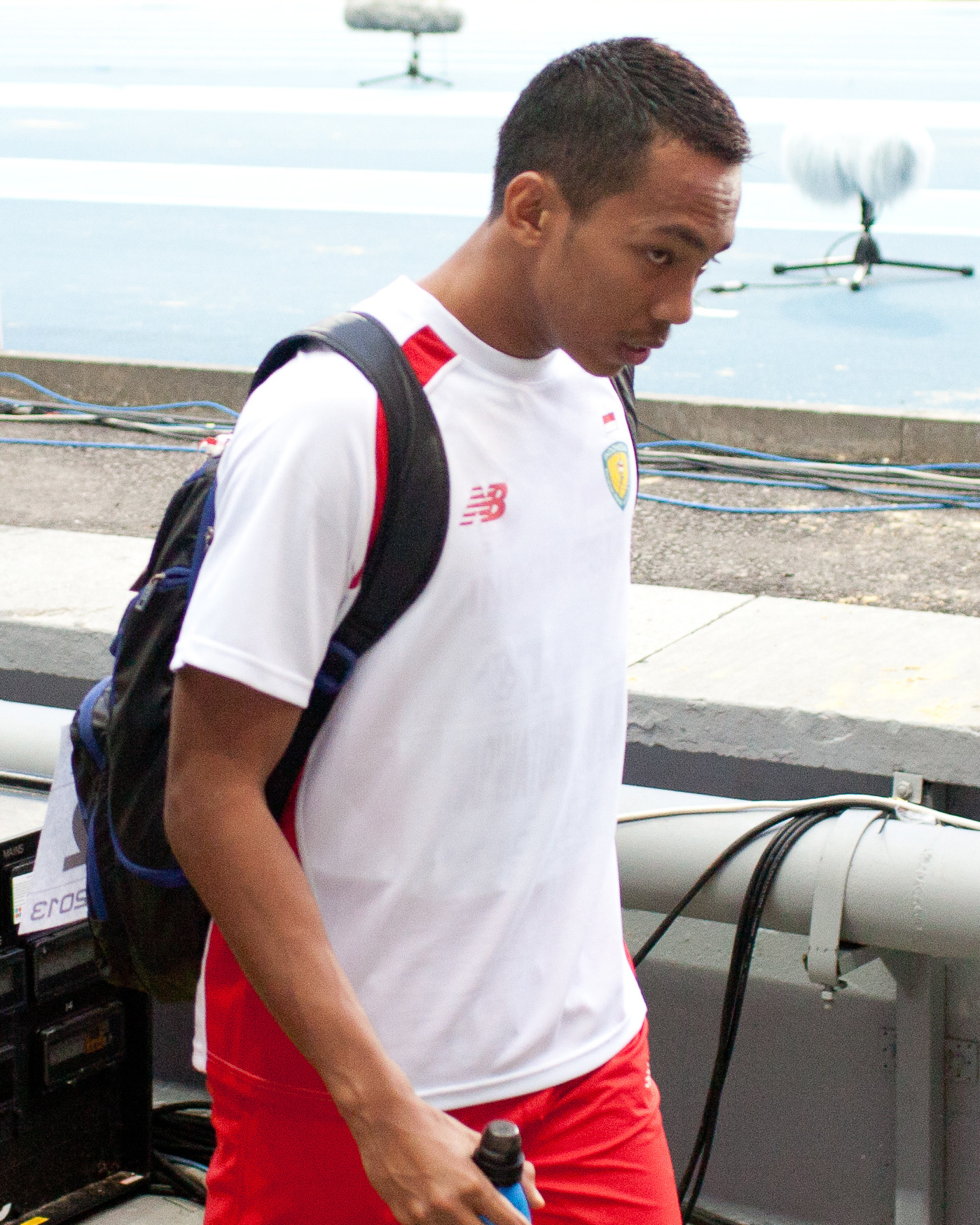
- Sapwaturrahman at the 2013 World Championships

Personal information
- Nationality: Indonesian
- Born: 13 May 1994 (age 32) Brang Biji, Sumbawa, Indonesia

Sport
- Sport: Track and field
- Events: 100m, Long jump
Medal record
Men's athletics
Representing Indonesia
Asian Games
Bronze medal – third place	2018 Jakarta–Palembang	Long jump
Islamic Solidarity Games
Bronze medal – third place	2013 Palembang	4 × 100 m relay
SEA Games
Gold medal – first place	2019 Philippines	Long jump
Bronze medal – third place	2019 Philippines	Triple jump
Bronze medal – third place	2021 Vietnam	Long jump
Bronze medal – third place	2023 Cambodia	Long jump
ASEAN University Games
Gold medal – first place	2016 Singapore	Long jump

Sapwaturrahman (born 13 May 1994) is an Indonesian track and field athlete. He competed in the 100 metres event at the 2013 World Championships in Athletics. He was the 2019 SEA Games and 2016 ASEAN University Games champion in the long jump. In 2018, Sapwaturrahman won the bronze medal in long jump at the 18th Asian Games in Jakarta, Indonesia.

== Early life ==
Sapwaturrahman was born on 13 May 1994, and raised in Brang Biji, Sumbawa, West Nusa Tenggara. Sapwaturrahman is the son of Sanapiah and Mastambuan. He participated in several district-level competitions. While in junior high school, he was invited to join the PPLP NTB (West Nusa Tenggara Sports Training Center). Due to a transfer to Mataram, he transferred to Junior High School 13 Mataram. Sapwaturrahman was then invited to join the National Training Center.

== Career ==
=== Sprinter phase 2011-2015 ===
In 2011 he competed at the World Youth Championships in Lille, reaching the 100 metres semifinal and exiting in the heats of 200 metres with 22.13s. In 2012 he reached the semifinal of 60 metres at the Asian Indoor Championships Hangzhou with a national record 6.73s, and the 100 metres semifinal at the Asian Junior Championships Colombo. In 2013 he represented Indonesia at the World Championships in Moscow in the men's 100 metres. At the 2013 SEA Games in Naypyidaw he placed 4th in 100m with 10.65s. In 2013 he also won bronze in the 4 × 100 metre relay at the Islamic Solidarity Games Palembang. At the 2015 SEA Games in Singapore he placed 8th in 200 metres with 21.74s.

=== Transition to Long jump ===
In 2016 he became champion in long jump at the ASEAN University Games Singapore. In 2018 at the Asian Games in Jakarta, he won bronze in long jump with 8.09m, which remains the Indonesian national record, behind China's Wang Jianan and Zhang Yaoguang.

In 2019 at the Asian Championships Doha he had no valid attempt in the final. But at the 2019 SEA Games in the Philippines in Capas, he won gold in long jump with a SEA Games record 8.03m and bronze in triple jump with a national record 16.21m, behind Malaysia's Muhammad Hakimi Ismail and Mark Harry Diones of the Philippines.

At 2021 National Sports Week at Mimika Sports Center, he won gold in long jump with 7.58m, beating Shafwan Hafizah of North Sumatra and Suwandi Wijaya of Bangka Belitung. He dedicated the gold to his newborn child. At the 2021 SEA Games in Vietnam in Hanoi, he won bronze in long jump with 7.61m behind Nguyen Tien Trong of Vietnam with 7.80m and Janry Ubas of the Philippines with 7.73m, and placed 6th in triple jump with 15.55m.

At the 2023 SEA Games in Phnom Penh, he again won bronze in long jump with 7.62m behind Ubas and Nguyen, and placed 9th in triple jump with 14.75m.

At 2024 National Sports Week at Madya Athletic Stadium Sumut Sport Center Deli Serdang, he made history by doubling gold. In men's long jump he won gold with 7.69m, breaking his own National Sports Week record of 7.58m in Papua and breaking the 1996 National Sports Week Jakarta record of 7.64m held by Yousan Lekahena. The final featured 12 athletes from 9 provinces, with silver Ahmad Ambali Sukur of Bangka Belitung 7.51m and bronze Arifianto Firmansyah of Central Java 7.46m. In men's triple jump the next day, he won a second gold with 15.64m, though not breaking his own national record of 16.21m.

At the 2025 National Athletics Championships in Surakarta, he won gold in senior long jump with 7.45m for West Nusa Tenggara, and was part of the 2025 SEA Games athletics team, where he placed 9th in long jump with 7.18m and 7th in triple jump with 15.48m.
