= Stephen Newbold =

Bahamian sprinter

Personal information
- Nationality: Bahamas
- Born: 5 August 1994 (age 32)

Sport
- Sport: Running
- Events: 200 metres, 400 metres
- College team: Florida State Seminoles
- Coached by: Shaun Miller

Achievements and titles
- Personal bests: 200 m: 20.89 (Lille 2011); 400 m: 45.31 s (Gold Coast 2018)
Medal record
Men's athletics
Representing the Bahamas
Olympic Games
Bronze medal – third place	2016 Rio de Janeiro	4×400 m relay
Commonwealth Games
Silver medal – second place	2018 Gold Coast	4 × 400 m relay
NACAC U23 Championships
Bronze medal – third place	2016 San Salvador	4×100 m relay
Bronze medal – third place	2016 San Salvador	4×400 m relay
CARIFTA Games (Junior)
Gold medal – first place	2012 Hamilton	4×400 m relay
Bronze medal – third place	2011 Montego Bay	400 m
Bronze medal – third place	2011 Montego Bay	4×100 m relay
Bronze medal – third place	2013 Nassau	400m
Bronze medal – third place	2013 Nassau	4×400 m relay
World Youth Championships
Gold medal – first place	2011 Lille	200 m
CAC Junior Championships (Youth)
Gold medal – first place	2010 Santo Domingo	400 m hurdles
Gold medal – first place	2010 Santo Domingo	4×400 m relay
CARIFTA Games (Youth)
Gold medal – first place	2010 George Town	400 m hurdles
Silver medal – second place	2010 George Town	4×400 m relay

Stephen Newbold (born 5 August 1994) is a Bahamian sprinter. He attended Florida State University.

== Achievements ==
Year	Competition	Venue	Position	Event	Notes
Representing Bahamas
2010	CARIFTA Games (U-17)	George Town, Cayman Islands	1st	400m hurdles	52.75 CR
2010	CARIFTA Games (U-17)	George Town, Cayman Islands	2nd	4 × 400 m relay	3:17.53
2010	Central American and Caribbean; Junior Championships (U-17)	Santo Domingo, Dominican Republic	1st	400 m hurdles	54.25
2010	Central American and Caribbean; Junior Championships (U-17)	Santo Domingo, Dominican Republic	1st	4 × 400 m relay	3:16.30 CR
2010	World Junior Championships	Moncton, New Brunswick, Canada	41st (h)	400m	50.62
2011	CARIFTA Games (U-20)	Montego Bay, Jamaica	3rd	400 m	47.32
2011	CARIFTA Games (U-20)	Montego Bay, Jamaica	3rd	4 × 100 m relay	40.29
2011	CARIFTA Games (U-20)	Montego Bay, Jamaica	—	4 × 400 m relay	DQ
2011	World Youth Championships	Lille, France	1st	200 m	20.89
2011	World Youth Championships	Lille, France	5th	Medley relay	1:52.51
2012	CARIFTA Games (U-20)	Hamilton, Bermuda	1st	4 × 400 m relay	3:09.23
2012	World Junior Championships	Barcelona, Spain	6th	4 × 100 m relay	39.74
2012	World Junior Championships	Barcelona, Spain	11th (h)	4 × 400 m relay	3:08.96
2013	CARIFTA Games (U-20)	Nassau, Bahamas	3rd	400 m	46.01
2013	CARIFTA Games (U-20)	Nassau, Bahamas	3rd	4 × 400 m relay	3:07.44
2014	World Relays	Nassau, Bahamas	–	4 × 100 m relay	DQ
2016	NACAC U-23 Championships	San Salvador, El Salvador	5th	400 m	46.27
2016	NACAC U-23 Championships	San Salvador, El Salvador	3rd	4 × 100 m relay	39.85
2016	NACAC U-23 Championships	San Salvador, El Salvador	3rd	4 × 400 m relay	3:04.74
2016	Olympic Games	Rio de Janeiro, Brazil	6th (h)	4 × 400 m relay	2:59.64
2018	Commonwealth Games	Gold Coast, Australia	2nd	4 × 400 m relay	3:01.92
2018	Central American and Caribbean Games	Barranquilla, Colombia	5th	4 × 400 m relay	3:07.31
2019	World Relays	Yokohama, Japan	6th (h)	4 × 200 m relay	1:22.40^{1}

^{1}Disqualified in the final
