= Akiyuki Hashimoto =

Japanese sprinter (born 1994)

Personal information
- Nationality: Japan
- Born: 18 November 1994 (age 31) Kagoshima Prefecture, Japan
- Height: 1.75 m (5 ft 9 in)
- Weight: 61 kg (134 lb)

Sport
- Sport: Running
- Event(s): 100 metres, 200 metres
- University team: Waseda University
- Club: Fujitsu Track & Field

Achievements and titles
- Personal best: 100 m: 10.29 (Yokohama 2015) 200 m: 20.35 (Fukuroi 2013)
Medal record
Men's athletics
Representing Japan
World Junior Championships
Bronze medal – third place	2012 Barcelona	4×100 m relay
World Youth Championships
Silver medal – second place	2011 Lille	Medley relay

Akiyuki Hashimoto (橋元 晃志, Hashimoto Akiyuki; born 18 November 1994) is a Japanese sprinter.

He finished fourth in the 200 m at the 2011 World Youth Championships in Athletics.

== Personal bests ==
Event	Time	Wind	Venue	Date	Notes
100 m	10.29 s	+0.4 m/s	Yokohama, Japan	14 May 2015	
200 m	20.35 s	-0.3 m/s	Fukuroi, Japan	3 May 2013	Japan's 10th-fastest time

== Records ==
- 200 metres
  - Former Japanese youth best holder - 20.82 s (wind: 0.0 m/s) (Nagoya, 23 October 2011)
- 4 × 100 m relay
  - Current Asian and Japanese junior record holder - 39.01 s (relay leg: 2nd) (Barcelona, 13 July 2012)^{[a]}
  - Current Japanese high school record holder - 39.16 s (relay leg: 2nd) (Fukuroi, 3 May 2012)^{[b]}
- 4 × 200 m relay
  - Current Japanese and Japanese university record holder - 1:22.12 s (relay leg: 1st) (Yokohama, 14 September 2014)^{[c]}
- Medley relay (100m×200m×300m×400m)
  - Former Japanese youth best holder - 1:50.69 s (relay leg: 2nd) (Lille, 10 July 2011)^{[d]}

^{a} with Kazuma Ōseto, Asuka Cambridge, and Kazuki Kanamori
^{b} with Kazuma Ōseto, Tatsurō Suwa, and Kazuki Kanamori
^{c} with Yūki Takeshita, Shōtarō Aikyō, and Hiroyuki Mihara
^{d} with Kazuma Ōseto, Shōtarō Aikyō, and Takuya Fukunaga

== International competition record ==
Year	Competition	Venue	Position	Event	Notes
Representing Japan
2011	World Youth Championships	Lille, France	4th	200 m	21.21 (wind: +1.1 m/s)
2011	World Youth Championships	Lille, France	2nd	Medley relay	1:50.69 (relay leg: 2nd) NYB
2012	World Junior Championships	Barcelona, Spain	10th (sf)	200 m	21.20 (wind: -0.5 m/s)
2012	World Junior Championships	Barcelona, Spain	3rd	4 × 100 m relay	39.02 (relay leg: 2nd)
2013	Universiade	Kazan, Russia	22nd (qf)	200 m	21.61 (wind: +1.7 m/s)
