= 2012 World Junior Championships in Athletics =

International athletics competition

- Host city: Barcelona, Catalonia, Spain
- Nations: 171
- Athletes: 1566
- Events: 44
- Dates: 10–15 July
- Opened by: Juan Carlos I of Spain
- Main venue: Estadi Olímpic Lluís Companys

The 2012 World Junior Championships in Athletics was an international athletics competition for athletes qualifying as juniors (born 1993 or later) which was held at the Estadi Olímpic Lluís Companys in Barcelona, Catalonia, Spain, on 10–15 July 2012. A total of 44 athletics events were contested at the championships, 22 by male and 22 by female athletes.

Several medalists from the 2010 championships were eligible to defend their titles, including Jacko Gill, Jodie Williams, Shaunae Miller, and Angelica Bengtsson. Gill and Bengtsson were successful.

== Men's results ==
=== Track ===
Event	Gold		Silver		Bronze	
100 m	Adam Gemili; Great Britain	10.05; WJL CR	Aaron Ernest; United States	10.17; PB	Odean Skeen; Jamaica	10.28; PB
200 m	Delano Williams; Turks and Caicos Islands	20.48; NJ	Aaron Ernest; United States	20.53; PB	Tyreek Hill; United States	20.54
400 m	Luguelín Santos; Dominican Republic	44.85	Arman Hall; United States	45.39; PB	Steven Solomon; Australia; Aldrich Bailey; United States	45.52
800 m	Nigel Amos; Botswana	1:43.79; CR	Timothy Kitum; Kenya	1:44.56	Edwin Kiplagat Melly; Kenya	1:44.79; PB
1500 m	Hamza Driouch; Qatar	3:39.04	Hillary Cheruiyot Ngetich; Kenya	3:40.39; PB	Abdelhadi Labâli; Morocco	3:40.60
5000 m	Muktar Edris; Ethiopia	13:38.95	Abrar Osman Adem; Eritrea	13:40.52	Wiliam Malel Sitonik; Kenya	13:40.52
10,000 m	Yigrem Demelash; Ethiopia	28:16.07; PB	Philemon Kipchilis Cheboi; Kenya	28:23.98; PB	Geoffrey Kipkorir Kirui; Kenya	28:30.47
110 m hurdles (99.0 cm)	Yordan O'Farrill; Cuba	13.18; CR	Nicholas Hough; Australia	13.27; AJ	Wilhem Belocian; France	13.29; NJ
400 m hurdles	Eric Futch; United States	50.24; WJL	Takahiro Matsumoto; Japan	50.41; PB	Ibrahim Mohammed Saleh; Saudi Arabia	50.47; PB
3000 m steeplechase	Conseslus Kipruto; Kenya	8:06.10; CR	Gilbert Kiplangat Kirui; Kenya	8:19.94	Hicham Sigueni; Morocco	8:30.14
4×100 m relay	United States; Tyreek Hill; Aldrich Bailey; Arthur Delaney; Aaron Ernest	38.67; WJL	Jamaica; Tykwendo Tracey; Odean Skeen; Jevaughn Minzie; Jazeel Murphy	38.97; NJ	Japan; Kazuma Oseto; Akiyuki Hashimoto; Aska Cambridge; Kazuki Kanamori	39.02
4×400 m relay	United States; Quincy Downing; Aldrich Bailey; Chidi Okezie; Arman Hall	3:03.99; WJL	Poland; Karol Zalewski; Rafał Smoleń; Piotr Kuśnierz; Patryk Dobek	3:05.05; NJ	Trinidad and Tobago; Asa Guevara; Jereem Richards; Brandon Benjamin; Machel Cedenio	3:06.32
10,000 m walk	Éider Arévalo; Colombia	40:09.74; WJL	Aleksandr Ivanov; Russia	40:12.90; PB	Su Guanyu; China	40:16.87; PB

=== Field ===
Event	Gold		Silver		Bronze	
High jump	Andrei Churyla; Belarus	2.24	Falk Wendrich; Germany	2.24; PB	Ryan Ingraham; Bahamas	2.24
Pole vault	Thiago Braz; Brazil	5.55; NJ	Ivan Horvat; Croatia	5.55	Shawnacy Barber; Canada	5.55; NJ
Long jump	Sergey Morgunov; Russia	8.09	Andreas Trajkovski; Denmark	7.82; NJ	Jarrion Lawson; United States	7.64
Triple jump	Pedro Pichardo; Cuba	16.79; WJL	Artem Primak; Russia	16.60	Latario Collie-Minns; Bahamas	16.37
Shot put (6 kg)	Jacko Gill; New Zealand	22.20; CR	Krzysztof Brzozowski; Poland	21.78; NJ	Damien Birkinhead; Australia	21.14; NJ
Discus throw (1.750 kg)	Fedrick Dacres; Jamaica	62.80; PB	Wojciech Praczyk; Poland	62.75	Gerhard de Beer; South Africa	61.57
Hammer throw (6 kg)	Ashraf Amgad Elseify; Qatar	85.57; WJ	Bence Pásztor; Hungary	76.74	Suhrob Khodjaev; Uzbekistan	76.16; PB
Javelin throw	Keshorn Walcott; Trinidad and Tobago	78.64	Braian Toledo; Argentina	77.09	Morné Moolman; South Africa	76.29; PB
Decathlon (junior)	Gunnar Nixon; United States	8018; WJL	Jake Stein; Australia	7951; AJ	Tim Dekker; Netherlands	7815; PB

== Women's results ==
=== Track ===
Event	Gold		Silver		Bronze	
100 m	Anthonique Strachan; Bahamas	11.20; WJL	Nimet Karakuş; Turkey	11.36	Tamiris de Liz; Brazil	11.45
200 m	Anthonique Strachan; Bahamas	22.53; CR	Olivia Ekpone; United States	23.15; PB	Dezerea Bryant; United States	23.15
400 m	Ashley Spencer; United States	50.50; CR	Kadecia Baird; Guyana	51.04; AJ	Erika Rucker; United States	51.10; PB
800 m	Ajee' Wilson; United States	2:00.91; PB	Jessica Judd; Great Britain	2:00.96; PB	Manal El Bahraoui; Morocco	2:03.09
1500 m	Faith Kipyegon; Kenya	4:04.96; CR	Amela Terzić; Serbia	4:07.59; PB, NR	Senbere Teferi; Ethiopia	4:08.28; PB
3000 m	Mercy Chebwogen; Kenya	9:08.88; PB	Hiwot Gebrekidan; Ethiopia	9:09.27; PB	Emelia Gorecka; Great Britain	9:09.43; PB
5000 m	Buze Diriba; Ethiopia	15:32.94	Ruti Aga; Ethiopia	15:32.95; PB	Agnes Jebet Tirop; Kenya	15:36.74; PB
100 m hurdles	Morgan Snow; United States	13.38	Noemi Zbären; Switzerland	13.42	Ekaterina Bleskina; Russia	13.43
400 m hurdles	Janieve Russell; Jamaica	56.62; WJL	Aurélie Chaboudez; France	57.14; NJ	Kaila Barber; United States	57.63
3000 m steeplechase	Daisy Jepkemei; Kenya	9:47.22; WJL	Tejinesh Gebisa; Ethiopia	9:50.51; PB	Stella Jepkosgei Rutto; Kenya	9:50.58; PB
4×100 m relay	United States; Morgan Snow; Dezerea Bryant; Jennifer Madu; Shayla Sanders	43.89; WJL	Germany; Alexandra Burghardt; Ida Mayer; Katharina Grompe; Jessie Maduka	44.24; SB	Brazil; Camila de Souza; Tamiris de Liz; Nathalia da Rosa; Jéssica Carolina dos Reis	44.29; SB
4×400 m relay	United States; Erika Rucker; Olivia Ekpone; Kendall Baisden; Ashley Spencer	3:30.01; WJL	Jamaica; Sandrae Farquharson; Olivia James; Shericka Jackson; Janieve Russell	3:32.97; SB	Russia; Yana Glotova; Alina Galitskaya; Yuliya Koltachikhina; Ekaterina Renzhina	3:36.42
10,000 m walk	Ekaterina Medvedeva; Russia	45:41.74	Nadezhda Leontyeva; Russia	45:43.64; PB	Sandra Arenas; Colombia	45:44.46

=== Field ===
Event	Gold		Silver		Bronze	
High jump	Alessia Trost; Italy	1.91	Lissa Labiche; Seychelles	1.88; NJ	Mariya Kuchina; Russia	1.88
Pole vault	Angelica Bengtsson; Sweden	4.50; CR	Elizabeth Parnov; Australia	4.30	Roberta Bruni; Italy	4.20
Long jump	Katarina Johnson-Thompson; Great Britain	6.81w	Lena Malkus; Germany	6.80w	Jazmin Sawyers; Great Britain	6.67; WJL
Triple jump	Ana Peleteiro; Spain	14.17; WJL	Dovilė Dzindzaletaitė; Lithuania	14.17; WJL, NR	Liuba Zaldívar; Cuba	13.90
Shot put	Shanice Craft; Germany	17.15; WJL	Gao Yang; China	16.57	Bian Ka; China	16.48
Discus throw	Anna Rüh; Germany	62.38	Shanice Craft; Germany	60.42	Shelbi Vaughan; United States	60.07
Hammer throw	Alexandra Tavernier; France	70.62; CR	Alexia Sedykh; France	67.34	Alena Navahrodskaya; Belarus	67.13; PB
Javelin throw	Sofi Flinck; Sweden	61.40; WJL, NR	Liu Shiying; China	59.20; PB	Marija Vučenović; Serbia	57.12; PB
Heptathlon	Yorgelis Rodríguez; Cuba	5966	Xénia Krizsán; Hungary	5957; PB	Tamara de Sousa; Brazil	5900; AJ

== Medal table ==
* Host nation (Spain)

Rank	Nation	Gold	Silver	Bronze	Total
1	United States (USA)	9	5	6	20
2	Kenya (KEN)	4	4	5	13
3	Ethiopia (ETH)	3	3	1	7
4	Cuba (CUB)	3	0	1	4
5	Germany (GER)	2	4	0	6
6	Russia (RUS)	2	3	3	8
7	Jamaica (JAM)	2	2	1	5
8	Great Britain (GBR)	2	1	2	5
9	Bahamas (BAH)	2	0	2	4
10	Qatar (QAT)	2	0	0	2
10	Sweden (SWE)	2	0	0	2
12	France (FRA)	1	2	1	4
13	Brazil (BRA)	1	0	3	4
14	Belarus (BLR)	1	0	1	2
14	Colombia (COL)	1	0	1	2
14	Italy (ITA)	1	0	1	2
14	Trinidad and Tobago (TRI)	1	0	1	2
18	Botswana (BOT)	1	0	0	1
18	New Zealand (NZL)	1	0	0	1
18	Spain (ESP)*	1	0	0	1
18	Turks and Caicos Islands (TCA)	1	0	0	1
22	Australia (AUS)	0	4	1	5
23	Poland (POL)	0	3	0	3
24	China (CHN)	0	2	2	4
25	Hungary (HUN)	0	2	0	2
26	Japan (JPN)	0	1	1	2
26	Serbia (SRB)	0	1	1	2
28	Argentina (ARG)	0	1	0	1
28	Croatia (CRO)	0	1	0	1
28	Denmark (DEN)	0	1	0	1
28	Eritrea (ERI)	0	1	0	1
28	Guyana (GUY)	0	1	0	1
28	Lithuania (LTU)	0	1	0	1
28	Seychelles (SEY)	0	1	0	1
28	Switzerland (SUI)	0	1	0	1
28	Turkey (TUR)	0	1	0	1
37	Morocco (MAR)	0	0	3	3
38	South Africa (RSA)	0	0	2	2
39	Canada (CAN)	0	0	1	1
39	Netherlands (NED)	0	0	1	1
39	Saudi Arabia (KSA)	0	0	1	1
39	Uzbekistan (UZB)	0	0	1	1
Totals (42 entries)		43	46	43	132

== Participation ==
According to an unofficial count through an unofficial result list, 1566 athletes from 171 countries participated in the event. This is in agreement with the official numbers as published.

- Albania (1)
- Algeria (11)
- American Samoa (1)
- Andorra (2)
- Angola (1)
- Anguilla (1)
- Antigua and Barbuda (2)
- Argentina (9)
- Armenia (4)
- Australia (51)
- Austria (12)
- Azerbaijan (1)
- Bahamas (22)
- Bahrain (5)
- Bangladesh (1)
- Barbados (8)
- Belarus (17)
- Belgium (10)
- Belize (1)
- Benin (1)
- Bermuda (2)
- Bolivia (4)
- Bosnia and Herzegovina (2)
- Botswana (4)
- Brazil (29)
- British Virgin Islands (2)
- Bulgaria (5)
- Burkina Faso (1)
- Cameroon (1)
- Canada (46)
- Cape Verde (1)
- Cayman Islands (1)
- Chad (1)
- Chile (13)
- China (33)
- Chinese Taipei (9)
- Colombia (10)
- Comoros (1)
- Congo (1)
- DR Congo (1)
- Cook Islands (1)
- Costa Rica (3)
- Croatia (10)
- Cuba (12)
- Cyprus (5)
- Czech Republic (14)
- Denmark (8)
- Djibouti (1)
- Dominica (2)
- Dominican Republic (2)
- Ecuador (2)
- Egypt (3)
- El Salvador (1)
- Equatorial Guinea (1)
- Eritrea (3)
- Estonia (8)
- Ethiopia (19)
- Fiji (2)
- Finland (32)
- France (31)
- French Polynesia (1)
- Gabon (2)
- Georgia (2)
- Germany (61)
- Ghana (6)
- Gibraltar (1)
- Great Britain (36)
- Greece (12)
- Grenada (1)
- Guam (1)
- Guatemala (3)
- Guinea-Bissau (1)
- Guyana (3)
- Hong Kong (2)
- Hungary (22)
- Iceland (4)
- India (17)
- Indonesia (2)
- Iran (4)
- Iraq (2)
- Ireland (15)
- Israel (5)
- Italy (52)
- Jamaica (37)
- Japan (40)
- Kazakhstan (10)
- Kenya (25)
- Kuwait (3)
- Laos (1)
- Latvia (7)
- Lebanon (1)
- Lesotho (1)
- Lithuania (10)
- Luxembourg (2)
- Macau (1)
- Macedonia (2)
- Madagascar (1)
- Malta (1)
- Mauritania (1)
- Mauritius (1)
- Mexico (16)
- Micronesia (1)
- Moldova (2)
- Mongolia (1)
- Montenegro (1)
- Morocco (12)
- Mozambique (1)
- Namibia (2)
- Nauru (1)
- Netherlands (18)
- New Zealand (13)
- Nicaragua (1)
- Niger (1)
- Nigeria (10)
- Northern Mariana Islands (1)
- Norway (22)
- Oman (1)
- Pakistan (1)
- Palestine (1)
- Panama (1)
- Papua New Guinea (1)
- Paraguay (1)
- Peru (7)
- Poland (37)
- Portugal (14)
- Puerto Rico (8)
- Qatar (9)
- Romania (23)
- Russia (42)
- Rwanda (1)
- Saint Kitts and Nevis (1)
- Saint Lucia (2)
- Saint Vincent and the Grenadines (1)
- San Marino (2)
- São Tomé and Príncipe (1)
- Saudi Arabia (11)
- Senegal (1)
- Serbia (9)
- Seychelles (1)
- Singapore (1)
- Slovakia (9)
- Slovenia (20)
- Solomon Islands (1)
- South Africa (31)
- South Korea (13)
- Spain (54)
- Sri Lanka (6)
- Sudan (4)
- Sweden (22)
- Switzerland (19)
- Syria (1)
- Tajikistan (2)
- Thailand (7)
- Tonga (1)
- Trinidad and Tobago (16)
- Tunisia (8)
- Turkey (29)
- Turkmenistan (1)
- Turks and Caicos Islands (1)
- Uganda (5)
- Ukraine (47)
- United States (80)
- Uruguay (1)
- U.S. Virgin Islands (1)
- Uzbekistan (4)
- Vanuatu (1)
- Venezuela (10)
- Vietnam (1)
- Yemen (1)
- Zambia (2)
- Zimbabwe (1)
