= Odail Todd =

Jamaican sprinter (born 1994)

Personal information
- Nationality: Jamaica
- Born: 9 June 1994 (age 32) Hanover, Jamaica

Sport
- Sport: Running
- Event(s): 100 metres, 200 metres

Achievements and titles
- Personal best(s): 100 m: 10.39 s (Montego Bay 2013); 200 m: 20.78 s (Kingston 2013)
Medal record
Men's athletics
Representing Jamaica
CARIFTA Games (Junior)
Gold medal – first place	2011 Montego Bay	4×100 m relay
Silver medal – second place	2012 Hamilton	4×100 m relay
Bronze medal – third place	2011 Montego Bay	200 m
World Youth Championships
Gold medal – first place	2011 Lille Métropole	100 m
Silver medal – second place	2011 Lille Métropole	200 m
CAC Youth Championships
Gold medal – first place	2010 Santo Domingo	4×100 m relay
Silver medal – second place	2010 Santo Domingo	100 m
CARIFTA Games (Youth)
Gold medal – first place	2010 George Town	4×100 m relay
Bronze medal – third place	2010 George Town	200 m

Odail Todd (born 9 June 1994) is a Jamaican sprinter. In 2011 he attended Green Island High in Hanover, Jamaica.

He won the 100 metres at the 2011 World Youth Championships in Athletics in Lille Métropole, France. Todd was only drafted into the event after both 2011 World Youth leader Jazeel Murphy and 2010 Youth Olympic 100 m champion Odean Skeen were forced to withdraw due to injury.

On 15 July, he was added to Jamaica's squad for the 2011 Pan American Junior Athletics Championships in Miramar, Florida. He finished fourth (10.41) in the 100 metres, behind Marvin Bracy (10.09), Keenan Brock (10.12), and Aaron Brown (10.25).

== Achievements ==
Year	Competition	Venue	Position	Event	Notes
Representing Jamaica
2010	CARIFTA Games (U-17)	George Town, Cayman Islands	4th	100 m	10.94 (0.6 m/s)
2010	CARIFTA Games (U-17)	George Town, Cayman Islands	3rd	200 m	21.55 (1.2 m/s)
2010	CARIFTA Games (U-17)	George Town, Cayman Islands	1st	4 × 100 m relay	41.62
2010	Central American and Caribbean Junior Championships (U-17)	Santo Domingo, Dominican Republic	2nd	100 m	10.97 (-2.3 m/s)
2010	Central American and Caribbean Junior Championships (U-17)	Santo Domingo, Dominican Republic	1st	4x100 m relay	40.88
2011	CARIFTA Games (U-20)	Montego Bay, Jamaica	3rd	200 m	21.08 (-0.2 m/s)
2011	CARIFTA Games (U-20)	Montego Bay, Jamaica	1st	4 × 100 m relay	39.75
2012	CARIFTA Games (U-20)	Hamilton, Bermuda	—	200m	DNS
2012	CARIFTA Games (U-20)	Hamilton, Bermuda	2nd	4 × 100 m relay	40.72
