= Arthur Delaney (athlete) =

American sprinter

- Occupation: track runner

Arthur Delaney is a track runner formerly with the Oregon Ducks He ran in the Olympic Trials in 2016. who competed at multiple NCAA championships. He was a gold medalist at the 2012 World Junior Championships in Athletics – Men's 4 × 100 metres relay
