= Aldrich Bailey =

American sprinter (born 1994)

Aldrich Bailey Jr
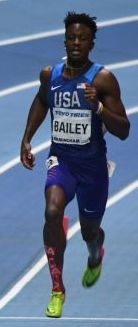
- Bailey in 2018

Personal information
- Born: February 6, 1994 (age 32) Dallas, Texas, U.S.
- Height: 5 ft 10 in (1.78 m)
- Weight: 168 lb (76 kg)

Sport
- Sport: Running
- Event: 400 metres
- College team: Texas Longhorns

Achievements and titles
- Personal bests: 200 m: 20.30 (Austin 2015); 400 m: 45.19 (Lubbock 2012); 400 m hurdles: 48.55 (Eugene 2021)
Medal record
Men's athletics
Representing the United States
World Indoor Championships
| Silver medal – second place | 2018 Birmingham | 4 × 400 m relay |
World Junior Championships
| Gold medal – first place | 2012 Barcelona | 4×100 m relay |
| Gold medal – first place | 2012 Barcelona | 4×400 m relay |
| Silver medal – second place | 2012 Barcelona | 400 m |
World Youth Championships
| Gold medal – first place | 2011 Lille | Medley relay |

Aldrich Bailey Jr. (born February 6, 1994) is an American sprinter. He graduated from Mansfield Timberview High School in Arlington, Texas in 2012, and was committed to Texas A&M University in 2012. In 2014 Bailey transferred to the University of Texas as a Track and Field Athlete.

On April 28, 2012, Bailey broke the U.S. High School Record in the 400 metres, previously held by Calvin Harrison of North Salinas High School, at the Texas Class 5A Region I meet in Lubbock, Texas. Harrison had held the record since 1993, a year before Bailey was born.

He was an All-USA high school track and field team selection by USA Today in 2011 and 2012.

Bailey was part of the US medley relay team that established a new World Youth Best at the 2011 World Youth Championships in Athletics. He also competed in the 200 metres, but finished sixth. He wears a duck tail at the back of his head as a signature style.

In 2021, Bailey began running the 400 meters hurdles. That season, he placed fourth at the U.S. Olympic Trials in a personal best time of 48.55 seconds, missing the Olympic team by one place. In its year-end U.S. rankings, Track & Field News ranked him fifth.

In 2024, Bailey received a warning from USADA for testing positive for ostarine.
