= Jazeel Murphy =

Jamaican sprinter (born 1994)

Personal information
- Nationality: Jamaica
- Born: 27 February 1994 (age 32)
- Height: 1.75 m (5 ft 9 in)
- Weight: 72 kg (159 lb)

Sport
- Sport: Running
- Event: Sprints

Achievements and titles
- Personal best(s): 100 m: 10.25 (Barcelona 2012); 200 m: 20.97 (Vieux Fort 2009)
Medal record
Athletics
Representing Jamaica
NACAC Championships
Bronze medal – third place	2022 Freeport	4×100 m relay
World Junior Championships
Silver medal – second place	2012 Barcelona	4×100 m relay
CARIFTA Games (Junior)
Gold medal – first place	2011 Montego Bay	100 m
Gold medal – first place	2011 Montego Bay	4×100 m relay
Gold medal – first place	2012 Hamilton	100 m
Silver medal – second place	2013 Nassau	100 m
CARIFTA Games (Youth)
Gold medal – first place	2009 Vieux Fort	100 m
Gold medal – first place	2009 Vieux Fort	200 m
Gold medal – first place	2009 Vieux Fort	4×100 m relay
- Updated on 30 January 2015

Jazeel Murphy (born 27 February 1994) is a Jamaican sprinter.

As early as 2009, he has been dubbed Jamaica's next great sprinter. At the 2011 CARIFTA Games, Murphy ran a 10.27 sec to win the boys U20 100 metres title.

== Personal bests ==
Event	Result	Venue	Date
100 m	10.25 s (wind: -1.2 m/s)	(Spain) Barcelona	11 Jul 2012
200 m	20.97 s (wind: +1.4 m/s)	(Saint Lucia) Vieux Fort	13 Apr 2009

== Achievements ==
Year	Competition	Venue	Position	Event	Notes
Representing Jamaica
2009	CARIFTA Games (U-17)	Vieux Fort, Saint Lucia	1st	100 m	10.41s (wind: +2.0 m/s)
2009	CARIFTA Games (U-17)	Vieux Fort, Saint Lucia	1st	200 m	20.97s CR (wind: -0.2 m/s)
2009	CARIFTA Games (U-17)	Vieux Fort, Saint Lucia	1st	4 × 100 m relay	40.76s CR
2011	CARIFTA Games (U-20)	Montego Bay, Jamaica	1st	100 m	10.27s (wind: -0.2 m/s)
2011	CARIFTA Games (U-20)	Montego Bay, Jamaica	1st	4 × 100 m relay	39.75s
2012	CARIFTA Games (U-20)	Hamilton, Bermuda	1st	100 m	10.31s w (wind: 5.7 m/s)
2012	Central American and Caribbean Junior Championships	San Salvador, El Salvador	1st	4 × 100 m relay	39.39
2012	World Junior Championships	Barcelona, Spain	5th	100 m	10.29 (wind: +0.1 m/s)
2012	World Junior Championships	Barcelona, Spain	2nd	4 × 100 m relay	38.97
2013	CARIFTA Games (U20)	Nassau, The Bahamas	2nd	100m	10.48 (wind: -0.4 m/s)
2013	CARIFTA Games (U20)	Nassau, The Bahamas	1st	4 × 100 m relay	39.92
2013	Pan American Junior Championships	Medellín, Colombia	4th	100m	10.46 (wind: +1.8 m/s)
2013	Pan American Junior Championships	Medellín, Colombia	2nd	4 × 100 m relay	39.68
2014	NACAC U-23 Championships	Kamloops, British Columbia, Canada	2nd	4 × 100 m relay	38.78
2022	NACAC Championships	Freeport, Bahamas	5th	200 m	20.92
2022	NACAC Championships	Freeport, Bahamas	3rd	4 × 100 m relay	38.93
