= Arman Hall =

American sprinter

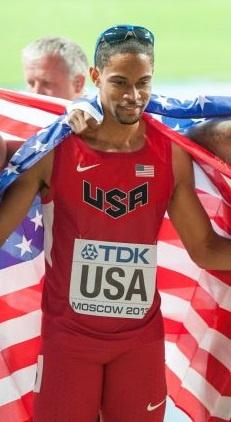
- Hall at the 2013 World Championships

Personal information
- National team: United States
- Born: February 12, 1994 (age 32) Miami, Florida, U.S.
- Height: 6 ft 0 in (183 cm)
- Weight: 165 lb (75 kg)

Sport
- Sport: Track and field
- Events: 200 metres, 400 metres

Achievements and titles
- Personal best: 200 m: 20.30 (Tuscaloosa) 400 m: 44.82 (Eugene)
Medal record
Men's athletics
Representing the United States
Olympic Games
Gold medal – first place	2016 Rio de Janeiro	4 × 400 m relay
World Championships
Gold medal – first place	2013 Moscow	4 × 400 m relay
World Junior Championships
Gold medal – first place	2012 Barcelona	400 m
Gold medal – first place	2012 Barcelona	4 × 100 m relay
Gold medal – first place	2012 Barcelona	4 × 400 m relay
World Youth Championships
Gold medal – first place	2011 Lille	400 m
Gold medal – first place	2011 Lille	Medley relay

Arman "Gino" Hall (born February 12, 1994) is an American sprinter specializing in the 400 m. He is a World and Olympic gold medalist as a member of USA's 2014 and 2016 4 × 400 m relay teams.

He attended St. Thomas Aquinas High School in Fort Lauderdale, Florida. Hall was raised in Pembroke Pines, Florida and lived with his mother, father and older brother. Hall was an All-USA high school track and field team selection by USA Today in 2011. He won the 400 metres at the 2011 World Youth Championships in Athletics in Lille Métropole, France. Hall also ran the 2011 youth world-leading over 200 metres the same year.

Hall verbally committed to the University of Florida on December 5, 2011, and joined the Gators track team in the fall of 2012. During his collegiate career, Hall was a 3-time NCAA champion, 10-time Outdoor All-American and 7-time Indoor All-American. While at the University of Florida, Hall majored in African American studies.

During his freshman year, at just 19 years old, Hall placed 3rd at the 2014 USA Outdoor Track and Field Championships in the 400 m. He went on to represent USA at the 2014 IAAF World Athletics Championships in the open 400 m and as part of the 4 × 400 m relay.

In 2016, he earned Olympic gold as lead-off for Team USA's 4 × 400 m relay at the 2016 Summer Olympics. Earlier in 2016, he won the NCAA Men's Division I Outdoor Track and Field Championships title in the 400 m.

Hall currently trains in Phoenix, Arizona.
