= Méba-Mickaël Zeze =

French sprinter

Méba Mickaël Zézé
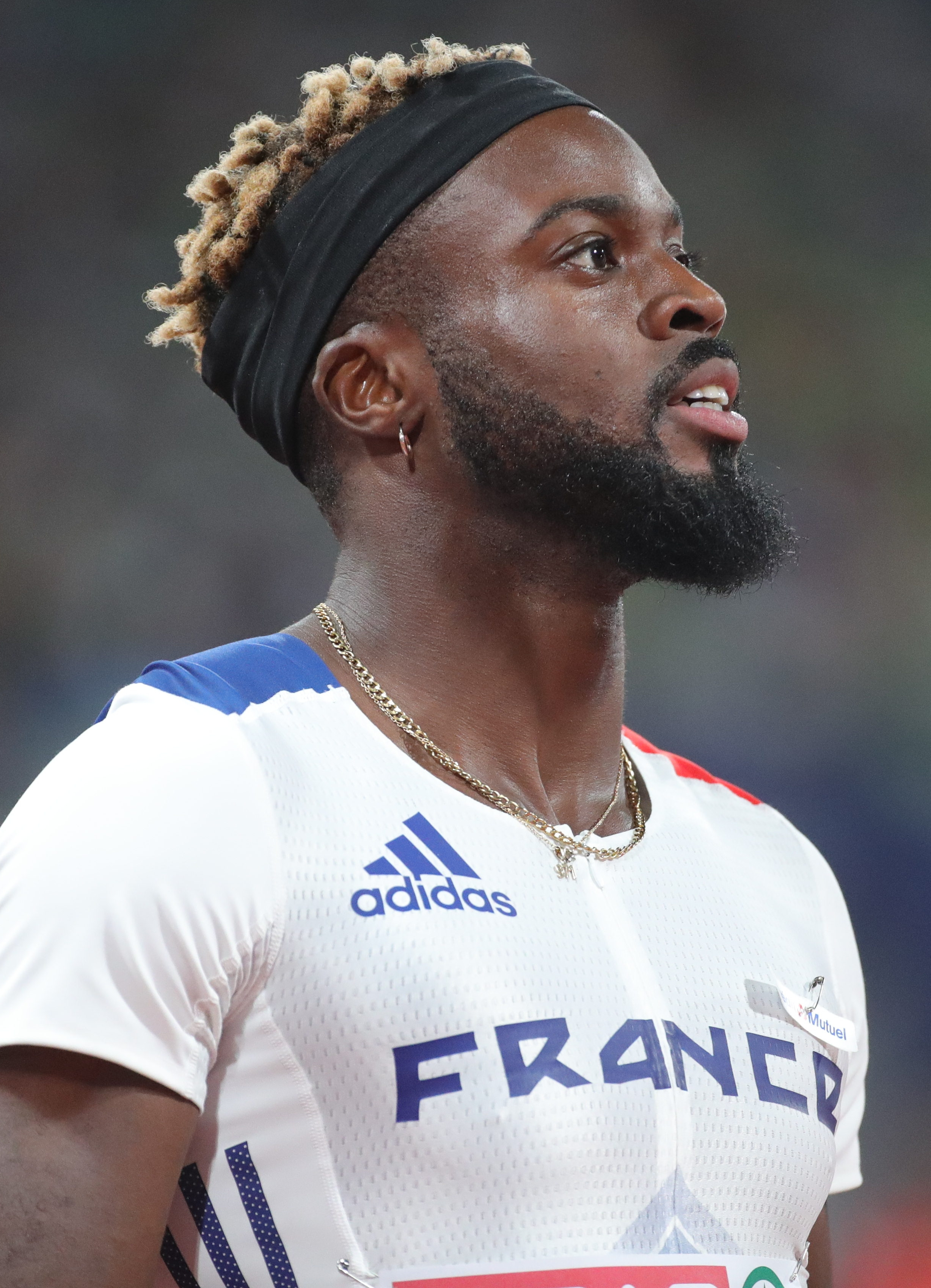
- Zézé in 2022

Personal information
- Born: 19 May 1994 (age 32) Saint-Aubin-lès-Elbeuf, France
- Height: 1.74 m (5 ft 9 in)
- Weight: 61 kg (134 lb)

Sport
- Country: France
- Sport: Running
- Events: 100 metres, 200 metres

Achievements and titles
- Personal bests: 100m: 9.99 (La Chaux de Fonds 2022); 200m: 19.97 (La Chaux de Fonds 2022)
Medal record
Men's athletics
Representing France
World Relays
Bronze medal – third place	2024 Nassau	4×100 m relay
European Championships
Silver medal – second place	2022 Munich	4×100 m relay
Silver medal – second place	2016 Amsterdam	4×100 m relay
Mediterranean Games
Silver medal – second place	2018 Tarragona	200 m
World Youth Championships
Bronze medal – third place	2011 Lille Métropole	100 m
European Youth Olympic Festival
Gold medal – first place	2011 Trabzon	4×100 m relay

Méba-Mickaël Zeze (born 19 May 1994) is a French sprinter who specialises in the 100 and 200 metres. He won the bronze medal at the 2011 World Youth Championships in Athletics in Lille Métropole, France. Earlier that year, Zézé broke the French Youth Record over 200 m, previously held by Christophe Lemaitre.

== Personal best ==
Distance	Time	venue
100m	9.99 s	La Chaux de Fonds, Suisse (3 July 2022)
200m	19.97 s	La Chaux de Fonds, Suisse (3 July 2022)
