= Najee Glass =

American sprinter and football player (born 1994)

Personal information
- Born: June 12, 1994 (age 32) Woodbridge Township, New Jersey, U.S.
- Height: 6 ft 2 in (1.88 m)
- Weight: 170 lb (77 kg)

Sport
- Sport: Track and field
- Event: 400 metres
- College team: Florida Gators

Achievements and titles
- Personal best: 400 m: 44.79 (Tom Jones Invite 2015)
Medal record
Men's athletics
Representing the United States
Summer Youth Olympics
Gold medal – first place	2010 Singapore	Medley relay
World Youth Championships
Gold medal – first place	2011 Lille	Medley relay

Najee Glass (born June 12, 1994) is an American sprinter and former American football wide receiver.

A native of Woodbridge Township, New Jersey, Glass attended St. Peter's Preparatory School, and was a sprinter at the University of Florida.

Glass finished sixth in the 400 m at the 2010 Summer Youth Olympics.

Glass was part of the US medley relay team that established a new World Youth best at the 2011 World Youth Championships in Athletics running a 31-second 300 m leg.

On February 26, 2012, Glass ran 46.06 to win the Brooks PR Invitational. His time was good for a Dempsey record (fastest of any collegiate or professional runner) and a US #1. A few weeks later on March 11, 2012, Glass became the 2012 Indoor National Champion. His time 46.57 was good for number 4 all-time.

He was an All-USA high school track and field team selection by USA Today in 2011.

Glass is a six-time USTFCCCA Indoor and Outdoor All-American. He also won USTFCCCA South Region Indoor Athlete of the Year.

While at the University of Florida, Glass was a part of the winning 4 × 400 m team at the 2013 NCAA Division I Outdoor National Championships. He captured the 2015 SEC Indoor 400 m title. Glass was a part of the winning 4 × 400 m team at the 2015 SEC Outdoor Championships.

On May 28, 2025, Glass was inducted into the St. Peter's Preparatory School Athletic Hall of Fame.

== Competition record ==
Year	Competition	Venue	Position	Event	Notes
Representing the United States
2014	NACAC U-23 Championships	Kamloops, British Columbia, Canada	1st	4 × 400 m relay	3:04.34
2017	IAAF World Relays	Nassau, Bahamas	1st (h)	4 × 400 m relay	3:02.51
