= 2011 World Youth Championships in Athletics =

World athletes games

- Host city: Lille Métropole, France
- Nations: 173
- Athletes: 1375
- Events: 40
- Dates: 6–10 July
- Main venue: Stadium Lille Métropole

The 2011 World Youth Championships in Athletics were the seventh edition of the World Youth Championships in Athletics. They were held in Lille Métropole, France, with stadium-based events at Stadium Lille Métropole in Villeneuve-d'Ascq, on 6–10 July 2011. Eligible athletes were aged 16 or 17 on 31 December 2011 (born in 1994 or 1995). The event had record participation levels, with 1375 athletes (757 boys/618 girls) from 173 countries entering the tournament.

Over the five-day competition, forty track and field events were contested (20 for boys and 20 for girls). A total of five world youth best marks were set in Lille. New Zealand's Jacko Gill won the shot put by four metres, improving his own youth best to 24.35 m. Jake Stein collected a record 6491 points in the octathlon, while Leonard Kirwa Kosencha of Kenya ran a world youth best of 1:44.08 minutes for the 800 metres. The United States boys and Jamaican girls ran record times to win their respective medley relay events. Four further championship records were also broken at the competition.

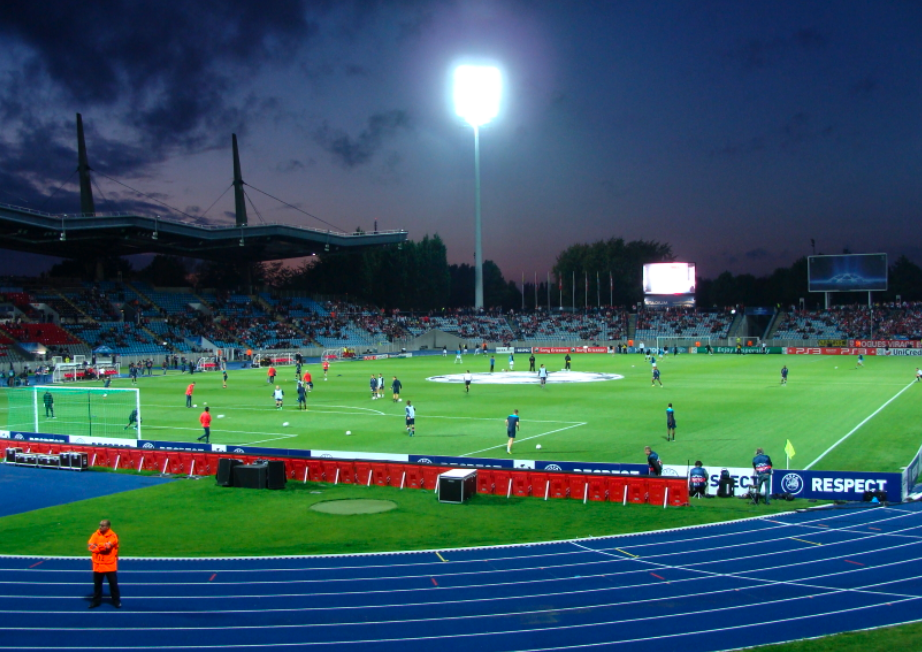
Host stadium in Lille

The United States topped the medals table (six golds and 16 in total), closely followed by Kenya, which took five golds and 14 altogether from the middle- and long-distance races. Jamaica came third, winning most of its medals in the sprints and jumps, although Fedrick Dacres made history by taking the country's first ever gold in the discus throw. The same top-three order occurred in the points table, which took into account placings in the top eight of each event.

== Medal summary ==
=== Boys ===
Event	Gold		Silver		Bronze	
100 metres	Odail Todd; Jamaica	10.51; PB	Kazuma Oseto; Japan	10.52	Mickaël Zézé; France	10.57
200 metres	Stephen Newbold; Bahamas	20.89; PB	Odail Todd; Jamaica	21.00; PB	Ronald Darby; United States	21.08
400 metres	Arman Hall; United States	46.01; WYL	Alphas Kishoyian; Kenya	46.58	Patryk Dobek; Poland	46.67; PB
800 metres	Leonard Kirwa Kosencha; Kenya	1:44.08; WYB	Mohammed Aman; Ethiopia	1:44.68; PB	Timothy Kitum; Kenya	1:44.98; PB
1500 metres	Teshome Dirirsa; Ethiopia	3:39.13; PB	Vincent Kiprotich Mutai; Kenya	3:39.17; PB	Jonathan Kiplimo Sawe; Kenya	3:39.54
3000 metres	William Malel Sitonik; Kenya	7:40.10; CR	Patrick Mutunga Mwikya; Kenya	7:40.47; PB	Abrar Osman; Eritrea	7:40.89; PB
110 metres hurdles	Andries van der Merwe; South Africa	13.41	Joshua Hawkins; New Zealand	13.44; PB	Wilhem Belocian; France	13.51; PB
400 metres hurdles	Egor Kuznetsov; Russia	50.97; WYL	Ibrahim Mohammed Saleh; Saudi Arabia	51.14; PB	Takahiro Matsumoto; Japan	51.26; PB
2000 metres steeplechase	Conseslus Kipruto; Kenya	5:28.65; WYL	Gilbert Kiplangat Kirui; Kenya	5:30.49	Zacharia Kiprotich; Uganda	5:37.98; PB
Medley relay	United States; Ronald Darby; Aldrich Bailey; Najee Glass; Arman Hall	1:49.47; WYB	Japan; Kazuma Oseto; Akiyuki Hashimoto; Shotaro Aikyo; Takuya Fukunaga	1:50.69; PB	France; Wilhem Belocian; Mickaël Zézé; Jordan Geenen; Thomas Jordier	1:51.81; PB
10,000 metres walk	Pavel Parshin; Russia	40:51.31; CR	Kenny Martín Pérez; Colombia	40:59.25; PB	Erwin González; Mexico	41:09.60; PB
High jump	Gaël Lévecque; France	2.13 m PB	Usman Usmanov; Russia	2.13 m PB	Justin Fondren; United States	2.13 m
Pole vault	Robert Renner; Slovenia	5.25 m PB	Melker Svärd-Jacobsson; Sweden	5.15 m	Jacob Blankenship; United States	5.05 m
Long jump	Lin Qing; China	7.83 m PB	Johan Taléus; Sweden	7.44 m	Stefano Braga; Italy	7.42 m
Triple jump	Latario Collie-Minns; Bahamas	16.06 m	Albert Janki; South Africa	15.95 m	Lathone Collie-Minns; Bahamas	15.51 m
Shot put	Jacko Gill; New Zealand	24.35 m WYB	Tyler Schultz; United States	20.35 m PB	Braheme Days, Jr. United States	20.14 m PB
Discus throw	Fedrick Dacres; Jamaica	67.05 m WYL	Ethan Cochran; United States	61.37 m PB	Gerhard de Beer; South Africa	60.63 m PB
Hammer throw	Bence Pásztor; Hungary	82.60 m CR	Özkan Baltaci; Turkey	78.63 m PB	Serhiy Reheda; Ukraine	74.06 m
Javelin throw	Reinhard van Zyl; South Africa	82.96 m PB	Morné Moolman; South Africa	80.99 m	Zhang Guisheng; China	77.62 m
Octathlon	Jake Stein; Australia	6491; WYB	Fredrick Ekholm; Sweden	6127; PB	Felipe dos Santos; Brazil	5966; PB

=== Girls ===
Event	Gold		Silver		Bronze	
100 metres	Jennifer Madu; United States	11.57; PB	Myasia Jacobs; United States	11.61	Christania Williams; Jamaica	11.63
200 metres	Desiree Henry; Great Britain	23.25; WYL	Christian Brennan; Canada	23.47; PB	Shericka Jackson; Jamaica	23.62
400 metres	Shaunae Miller; Bahamas	51.84; PB	Christian Brennan; Canada	52.12; PB	Olivia James; Jamaica	52.14; PB
800 metres	Ajee' Wilson; United States	2:02.64; PB	Wang Chunyu; China	2:03.23; PB	Jessica Judd; Great Britain	2:03.43
1500 metres	Faith Kipyegon; Kenya	4:09.48; CR	Senbere Teferi; Ethiopia	4:10.54; PB	Genet Tibieso; Ethiopia	4:11.56; PB
3000 metres	Gotytom Gebreslase; Ethiopia	8:56.36; WYL	Ziporah Wanjiru Kingori; Kenya	8:56.82; PB	Caroline Chepkoech Kipkirui; Kenya	8:58.63; PB
100 metres hurdles	Trinity Wilson; United States	13.11; WYL	Noemi Zbären; Switzerland	13.17; PB	Kendell Williams; United States	13.28; PB
400 metres hurdles	Nnenya Hailey; United States	57.93; WYL	Sarah Carli; Australia	58.05; PB	Surian Hechavarría; Cuba	58.37; PB
2000 metres steeplechase	Norah Jeruto Tanui; Kenya	6:16.41; WYL	Fadwa Sidi Madane; Morocco	6:20.98; PB	Lilian Jepkorir Chemweno; Kenya	6:21.85; PB
Medley relay	Jamaica; Christania Williams; Shericka Jackson; Chris-Ann Gordon; Olivia James	2:03.42; WYB	United States; Jennifer Madu; Bealoved Brown; Kendall Baisden; Robin Reynolds	2:03.92; SB	Canada; Shamelle Pless; Khamica Bingham; Christian Brennan; Sage Watson	2:05.72; PB
5000 metres walk	Kate Veale; Ireland	21:45.59; WYL	Mao Yanxue; China	22:00.15; PB	Nadezhda Leontyeva; Russia	22:00.84; PB
High jump	Ligia Grozav; Romania	1.87 m WYL	Iryna Herashchenko; Ukraine	1.87 m WYL	Chanice Porter; Jamaica	1.82 m
Pole vault	Desiree Singh; Germany	4.25 m WYL	Liz Parnov; Australia	4.20 m SB	Lucy Bryan; Great Britain	4.10 m PB
Long jump	Chanice Porter; Jamaica	6.22 m	Anastassia Angioi; Italy	6.17 m	Marina Buchelnikova; Russia	6.11 m
Triple jump	Sokhna Galle; France	13.62 m	Li Jingyu; China	13.57 m PB	Ana Peleteiro; Spain	12.92 m
Shot put	Guo Tianqian; China	15.24 m	Sophie McKinna; Great Britain	14.90 m	Katinka Urbaniak; Germany	14.71 m
Discus throw	Rosalía Vázquez; Cuba	53.51 m	Yan Liang; China	52.89 m PB	Shelbi Vaughan; United States	52.58 m
Hammer throw	Louisa James; Great Britain	57.13 m PB	Malwina Kopron; Poland	57.03 m PB	Roxana Perie; Romania	56.75 m PB
Javelin throw	Christin Hussong; Germany	59.74 m WYL	Sofi Flinck; Sweden	54.62 m PB	Monique Cilione; Australia	52.77 m PB
Heptathlon	Yusleidys Mendieta; Cuba	5697; WYL	Yorgelis Rodriguez; Cuba	5671; PB	Marjolein Lindemans; Belgium	5532; PB

== Medal table ==
* Host nation (France)

Rank	Nation	Gold	Silver	Bronze	Total
1	United States (USA)	6	4	6	16
2	Kenya (KEN)	5	5	4	14
3	Jamaica (JAM)	4	1	4	9
4	Bahamas (BAH)	3	0	1	4
5	China (CHN)	2	4	1	7
6	Ethiopia (ETH)	2	2	1	5
6	South Africa (RSA)	2	2	1	5
8	Great Britain (GBR)	2	1	2	5
8	Russia (RUS)	2	1	2	5
10	Cuba (CUB)	2	1	1	4
11	France (FRA)*	2	0	3	5
12	Germany (GER)	2	0	1	3
13	Australia (AUS)	1	2	1	4
14	New Zealand (NZL)	1	1	0	2
15	Romania (ROU)	1	0	1	2
16	Hungary (HUN)	1	0	0	1
16	Ireland (IRL)	1	0	0	1
16	Slovenia (SLO)	1	0	0	1
19	Sweden (SWE)	0	4	0	4
20	Canada (CAN)	0	2	1	3
20	Japan (JPN)	0	2	1	3
22	Italy (ITA)	0	1	1	2
22	Poland (POL)	0	1	1	2
22	Ukraine (UKR)	0	1	1	2
25	Colombia (COL)	0	1	0	1
25	Morocco (MAR)	0	1	0	1
25	Saudi Arabia (KSA)	0	1	0	1
25	Switzerland (SUI)	0	1	0	1
25	Turkey (TUR)	0	1	0	1
30	Belgium (BEL)	0	0	1	1
30	Brazil (BRA)	0	0	1	1
30	Eritrea (ERI)	0	0	1	1
30	Mexico (MEX)	0	0	1	1
30	Spain (ESP)	0	0	1	1
30	Uganda (UGA)	0	0	1	1
Totals (35 entries)		40	40	40	120

- All Information taken from IAAF's website.

== Participating nations ==
- Algeria
- American Samoa
- Angola
- Andorra
- Anguilla
- Antigua and Barbuda
- Argentina
- Armenia
- Azerbaijan
- Australia (29)
- Austria (12)
- Bahamas (15)
- Bahrain
- Barbados
- Belarus
- Belgium
- Benin
- Bermuda
- Bolivia
- Bosnia and Herzegovina
- Botswana
- Brazil (20)
- British Virgin Islands
- Bulgaria
- Burkina Faso
- Canada (42)
- Cameroon
- Cape Verde
- Cayman Islands
- Chad
- Chile
- China
- Chinese Taipei
- Colombia
- Cook Islands
- Ivory Coast
- Costa Rica
- Croatia
- Cuba
- Cyprus
- Czech Republic
- Denmark (12)
- Dominica
- Dominican Republic
- Ecuador
- Egypt
- Equatorial Guinea
- Eritrea
- El Salvador
- Estonia (9)
- Ethiopia
- Fiji
- Finland
- France (host)
- French Polynesia
- Gambia
- Georgia
- Germany (27)
- Great Britain (24)
- Greece
- Grenada
- Gibraltar
- Guatemala
- Guinea
- Guam
- Guyana
- Haiti
- Honduras
- Hong Kong
- Hungary
- Iceland
- India (19)
- Indonesia
- Iraq
- Ireland
- Israel
- Italy (39)
- Jamaica
- Japan
- Jordan
- Kazakhstan
- Kenya
- Kyrgyzstan
- Kiribati
- Kuwait
- Latvia (15)
- Laos
- Lebanon
- Lesotho
- Liberia
- Lithuania (8)
- Luxembourg
- Macau
- Macedonia
- Maldives
- Madagascar
- Malaysia
- Mali
- Malta
- Marshall Islands (1)
- Mauritania
- Mauritius
- Mexico
- Moldova
- Montenegro
- Montserrat
- Morocco
- Mozambique
- Namibia
- Nauru (1)
- Nicaragua
- Niger
- Nigeria
- New Zealand (10)
- Northern Mariana Islands
- Norway
- Oman
- Palestine
- Panama
- Papua New Guinea
- Paraguay
- Peru
- Philippines
- Poland
- Portugal
- Puerto Rico
- Qatar
- Romania
- Russia
- Saint Kitts and Nevis
- Saint Lucia
- Saint Vincent and the Grenadines
- San Marino
- Saudi Arabia
- Serbia
- Seychelles
- Singapore
- Slovakia
- Slovenia
- Solomon Islands
- South Africa
- South Korea
- Spain
- Sri Lanka (7)
- Sudan
- Suriname
- Sweden (19)
- Switzerland
- Swaziland
- Thailand
- Tajikistan
- Tonga
- Trinidad and Tobago
- Turkey
- Turkmenistan
- Tunisia
- Uganda
- Ukraine
- United Arab Emirates
- United States (40)
- Uruguay
- Uzbekistan
- Vanuatu
- Venezuela
- Zambia
- Zimbabwe
