= 2011 World Youth Championships in Athletics – Boys' 110 metres hurdles =

Boys' 110 metres hurdles at the 2011 World Youth Championships in Athletics
- Venue: Stadium Lille Métropole
- Dates: 7 July (heats); 8 July (semifinal & final)
- Competitors: 36
- Winning time: 13.41

Medalists
gold medal	Andries van der Merwe	South Africa
silver medal	Joshua Hawkins	New Zealand
bronze medal	Wilhem Belocian	France

The boys' 110 metres hurdles at the 2011 World Youth Championships in Athletics was held at the Stadium Lille Métropole on 7 and 8 July.

== Medalists ==
Gold	Silver	Bronze
Andries van der Merwe; South Africa	Joshua Hawkins; New Zealand	Wilhem Belocian; France

== Records ==
Prior to the competition, the following records were as follows.

World Youth Best	Wayne Davis (USA)	13.18	Ostrava, Czech Republic	12 July 2007
Championship Record	Wayne Davis (USA)	13.18	Ostrava, Czech Republic	12 July 2007
World Youth Leading	Andries van der Merwe (RSA)	13.39	Windhoek, South Africa	29 May 2011

No new records were established during the competition.

== Heats ==
Qualification rule: first 4 of each heat (Q) plus the 4 fastest times (q) qualified.

=== Heat 1 ===
Rank	Lane	Name	Nationality	Time	Notes
1	6	Andries van der Merwe	South Africa	13.78	Q
2	3	Moussa Al-Sabyani	Saudi Arabia	14.04	Q, PB
3	5	Benjamin Sédécias	France	14.23	Q
4	2	Javier Colomo	Spain	14.27	Q
5	4	César Ramírez	Mexico	14.50	
6	7	Han Se-hyun	South Korea	14.54	
	1	Amit Kumar Singh	India	DQ	

=== Heat 2 ===
Rank	Lane	Name	Nationality	Time	Notes
1	7	Wilhem Belocian	France	13.70	Q
2	2	Thomas Durant	Belgium	13.81	Q, PB
3	3	Todd Gurley	United States	13.86	Q, PB
4	4	Rihards Parandjuks	Latvia	14.50	Q
5	1	Ang Chen Xiang	Singapore	14.69	
6	5	Siosifa Lisala	Tonga	14.98	
	6	Tramaine Maloney	Barbados	DQ	

=== Heat 3 ===
Rank	Lane	Name	Nationality	Time	Notes
1	1	Tiaan Smit	South Africa	14.06	Q
2	5	Panayiotis Bekiaridis	Greece	14.10	Q
3	3	Yu Xin	China	14.17	Q
4	7	Facundo Andrada	Argentina	14.19	Q, PB
5	2	David Franco	Venezuela	14.29	q
6	6	Valdó Szűcs	Hungary	14.30	q
7	4	Mitch O'Donnell	Canada	14.43	

=== Heat 4 ===
Rank	Lane	Name	Nationality	Time	Notes
1	1	Takumi Takahata	Japan	13.88	Q, PB
2	5	Tyler Mason	Jamaica	14.08	Q
3	3	Cheng Yun-yin	Chinese Taipei	14.08	Q
4	7	Ruebin Walters	Trinidad and Tobago	14.32	Q
5	4	Kirk Lewis	Bahamas	14.32	q
6	6	Alif Ashraf Mohd Razali	Malaysia	14.46	
7	8	Diego Lyon	Chile	14.58	
8	2	Abdulrahman Saleh	United Arab Emirates	15.35	PB

=== Heat 5 ===
Rank	Lane	Name	Nationality	Time	Notes
1	5	Lorenzo Perini	Italy	13.71	Q
2	1	Joshua Hawkins	New Zealand	13.71	Q, PB
3	4	Omar McLeod	Jamaica	13.83	Q, PB
4	2	Vyacheslav Shvydkyy	Ukraine	13.95	Q
5	7	Patricio Colarte	Chile	14.28	q
6	3	Anousone Xaysa	Laos	15.20	PB
7	6	Andre Wright	Canada	21.25	

== Semifinals ==
Qualification rule: first 2 of each heat (Q) plus the 2 fastest times (q) qualified.

=== Heat 1 ===
Rank	Lane	Name	Nationality	Time	Notes
1	3	Takumi Takahata	Japan	13.66	Q, PB
2	5	Andries van der Merwe	South Africa	13.71	Q
3	6	Tyler Mason	Jamaica	13.80	q, PB
4	8	Vyacheslav Shvydyy	Ukraine	13.86	q, PB
5	4	Panayiotis Bekiaridis	Greece	14.04	
6	7	Benjamin Sédécias	France	14.07	
7	1	Patricio Colarte	Chile	14.17	SB
8	2	David Franco	Venezuela	14.27	

=== Heat 2 ===
Rank	Lane	Name	Nationality	Time	Notes
1	5	Wilhem Belocian	France	13.66	Q
2	6	Joshua Hawkins	New Zealand	13.77	Q
3	4	Thomas Durant	Belgium	13.90	
4	2	Ruebin Walters	Trinidad and Tobago	14.01	PB
5	7	Yun-Yin Cheng	Chinese Taipei	14.02	
6	3	Todd Gurley	United States	14.10	
7	8	Javier Colomo	Spain	14.24	
8	1	Kirk Lewis	Bahamas	14.52	

=== Heat 3 ===
Rank	Lane	Name	Nationality	Time	Notes
1	6	Mousa Al-Sabyani	Saudi Arabia	13.84	Q, PB
2	5	Omar McLeod	Jamaica	13.93	Q
3	4	Lorenzo Perini	Italy	13.96	
4	3	Tiaan Smit	South Africa	14.18	
5	2	Valdo Szücs	Hungary	14.45	
6	7	Facundo Andrada	Argentina	14.53	
7	8	Yu Xin	China	14.64	
8	1	Rihards Parandjuks	Latvia	14.81	

== Final ==
Rank	Lane	Name	Nationality	Time	Notes
1st place, gold medalist(s)	5	Andries van der Merwe	South Africa	13.41	
2nd place, silver medalist(s)	7	Joshua Hawkins	New Zealand	13.44	PB
3rd place, bronze medalist(s)	4	Wilhem Belocian	France	13.51	PB
4	8	Omar McLeod	Jamaica	13.61	PB
5	6	Takumi Takahata	Japan	13.71	
6	1	Tyler Mason	Jamaica	13.74	PB
7	3	Mousa Al-Sabyani	Saudi Arabia	13.81	PB
8	2	Vyacheslav Shvydkyy	Ukraine	13.94	
