= 2014 World Junior Championships in Athletics – Men's 110 metres hurdles =

The men's 110 metres hurdles at the 2014 World Junior Championships in Athletics was held at Hayward Field from 22 to 24 July.

== Medalists ==
Gold	Wilhem Belocian; France
Silver	Tyler Mason; Jamaica
Bronze	David Omoregie; Great Britain

== Records ==
Prior to the competition, the records were as follows:

World Junior Record	Liu Xiang (CHN)	13.12	Lausanne, Switzerland	2 July 2002
Championship Record	Yordan O'Farrill (CUB)	13.18	Barcelona, Spain	12 July 2012
World Junior Leading	Wilhem Belocian (FRA)	13.15	Mannheim, Germany	5 July 2014

== Schedule ==
Date	Time	Round
22 July 2014	11:00	Heats
23 July 2014	17:35	Semi-finals
24 July 2014	19:35	Final

All times are local times (UTC-7)

== Results ==
=== Heats ===
Qualification: First 3 in each heat (Q) and the next 3 fastest (q) advanced to the semi-finals.

The heats commenced at 11:01 on 22 July. Wind: +0.1 m/s, +0.5 m/s, −0.2 m/s, −0.1 m/s, −0.3 m/s, +0.7 m/s, +0.6 m/s.

Rank	Heat	Lane	Name	Nationality	Time	Notes
1	6	2	David Omoregie	Great Britain	13.24	Q
2	4	4	Wilhem Belocian	France	13.40	Q
3	5	3	Tyler Mason	Jamaica	13.46	Q
4	2	7	Theophile Viltz	United States	13.59	Q
5	3	6	Nick Anderson	United States	13.61	Q
6	1	5	Benjamin Sédécias	France	13.62	Q
7	1	8	Roger Iribarne	Cuba	13.63	Q
8	2	1	Patrick Elger	Germany	13.64	Q
9	2	8	Welington Zaza	Liberia	13.66	Q, SB
9	3	5	Valdó Szűcs	Hungary	13.66	Q, PB
11	3	8	Masahiro Kagimoto	Japan	13.68	Q
12	3	1	Ricardo Torres	Puerto Rico	13.71	q, NJR
12	7	7	Marvin Williams	Jamaica	13.71	Q
14	6	6	Job Beintema	Netherlands	13.74	Q
14	2	2	Ivor Metcalf	Australia	13.74	q, PB
16	7	1	Francisco López	Spain	13.75	Q
17	5	1	Ruebin Walters	Trinidad and Tobago	13.76	Q
18	6	3	Júlio César de Oliveira	Brazil	13.80	Q
19	7	3	Taioh Kanai	Japan	13.81	Q
20	1	4	Matthew de Bruin	Australia	13.87	Q
21	4	3	Gabriel Constantino	Brazil	13.88	Q
22	4	8	David Franco	Venezuela	13.89	Q
23	6	1	Simone Poccia	Italy	13.90	q, PB
24	4	2	Michael Nicholls	Barbados	13.92	
25	5	6	Kirk Lewis	Bahamas	13.93	Q
26	5	4	Luca De Maestri	Italy	13.98	
27	3	3	Joshuán Berrios	Colombia	13.99	
28	7	5	Lin Chih-Hao	Chinese Taipei	14.00	
29	5	2	Khai Riley-Laborde	Great Britain	14.01	
29	1	1	Xavier Coakley	Bahamas	14.01	
31	1	3	Maurus Meyer	Switzerland	14.02	
32	5	5	Bashiru Abdullahi	Nigeria	14.04	NJR
32	7	6	Dawid Żebrowski	Poland	14.04	
32	6	5	Gerard Mateu Porras	Spain	14.04	
35	2	5	Alain-Hervé Mfomkpa	Switzerland	14.09	
35	2	6	Aleksey Kudryavtsev	Russia	14.09	
37	4	7	Huang Shih-Wei	Chinese Taipei	14.10	
38	2	3	Rapolas Saulius	Lithuania	14.19	
39	1	6	Adrian Boldeanu	Romania	14.20	PB
40	5	8	David Sarancic	Croatia	14.21	
40	3	7	Arasy Akbar Witarsa	Indonesia	14.21	
42	4	5	Bohdan Chornomaz	Ukraine	14.26	
43	7	8	Francisco López	Chile	14.36	
44	1	2	Mauricio Vázquez	Mexico	14.38	
45	7	4	Fung Kin Lok	Hong Kong	14.43	
46	6	7	Samir Akovali	Turkey	14.51	PB
46	5	7	Chewys Parra	Puerto Rico	14.51	
48	6	4	Maksat Kandymov	Ukraine	14.53	
49	6	8	Aaron Lewis	Trinidad and Tobago	14.58	
50	3	4	Yakubu Ibrahim	Ghana	14.61	NJR
51	7	2	Shin Dong-min	South Korea	14.73	NJR
52	4	6	Jorge Burgos	Mexico	14.76	
53	2	4	Namataiki Tevenino	French Polynesia	15.08	
54	3	2	Gastón Sayago	Argentina	16.92	
	1	7	Abu Kamara	Sierra Leone	DNS	

=== Semi-finals ===
Qualification: First 2 in each semi-final (Q) and the next 2 fastest (q) advanced to the final.

The semi-finals commenced at 17:32 on 23 July. Wind: -1.6 m/s, -0.3 m/s, −1.7 m/s.

Rank	Heat	Lane	Name	Nationality	Time	Notes
1	1	6	Wilhem Belocian	France	13.23	Q
2	2	4	David Omoregie	Great Britain	13.36	Q
3	2	6	Benjamin Sédécias	France	13.45	Q
3	3	5	Tyler Mason	Jamaica	13.45	Q
5	3	8	Welington Zaza	Liberia	13.53	Q, NJR
6	2	3	Francisco López	Spain	13.55	q, NJR
7	2	7	Ruebin Walters	Trinidad and Tobago	13.61	q
8	1	5	Nick Anderson	United States	13.68	Q
9	2	5	Marvin Williams	Jamaica	13.70	
10	3	6	Patrick Elger	Germany	13.84	
11	1	7	Taioh Kanai	Japan	13.85	
12	1	3	Roger Iribarne	Cuba	13.87	
13	2	8	Júlio César de Oliveira	Brazil	13.91	
14	1	8	Gabriel Constantino	Brazil	13.93	
14	3	3	Valdó Szűcs	Hungary	13.93	
16	1	1	Ivor Metcalf	Australia	13.94	
17	1	2	David Franco	Venezuela	13.98	
18	2	1	Matthew de Bruin	Australia	13.99	
19	3	4	Theophile Viltz	United States	14.02	
20	3	7	Masahiro Kagimoto	Japan	14.04	
21	3	1	Kirk Lewis	Bahamas	14.05	
22	1	4	Job Beintema	Netherlands	14.10	
23	2	2	Simone Poccia	Italy	14.15	
24	3	2	Ricardo Torres	Puerto Rico	14.34	

=== Final ===
The final commenced at 19:33 on 24 July. Wind: +0.5 m/s.

Rank	Lane	Name	Nationality	Time	Notes
1st place, gold medalist(s)	4	Wilhem Belocian	France	12.99	WJR
2nd place, silver medalist(s)	6	Tyler Mason	Jamaica	13.06	AJR
3rd place, bronze medalist(s)	5	David Omoregie	Great Britain	13.35	
4	7	Welington Zaza	Liberia	13.38	AJR
5	3	Benjamin Sédécias	France	13.47	
6	2	Ruebin Walters	Trinidad and Tobago	13.52	PB
7	1	Francisco López	Spain	13.55	NJR
8	8	Nick Anderson	United States	13.93	
