= 2012 World Junior Championships in Athletics – Men's 110 metres hurdles =

The men's 110 metres hurdles at the 2012 World Junior Championships in Athletics was held at the Estadi Olímpic Lluís Companys on 10–12 July.

== Medalists ==
Gold	Yordan Luis O'Farrill; Cuba
Silver	Nicholas Hough; Australia
Bronze	Wilhem Belocian; France

== Records ==
Prior to the competition, the existing world junior and championship records were as follows.

World Junior Record	Wayne Davis (USA)	13.08	Port of Spain, Trinidad and Tobago	31 July 2009
Championship Record	Artur Noga (POL)	13.23	Beijing, China	20 August 2006
World Junior Leading	James Gladman (GBR)	13.30	Mannheim, Germany	23 June 2012
Broken records during the 2012 World Junior Championships in Athletics
Championship Record	Yordan Luis O'Farrill (CUB)	13.18	Barcelona, Spain	12 July 2012

== Results ==
=== Heats ===
Qualification: The first 2 of each heat (Q) and the 8 fastest times (q) qualified

Rank	Heat	Lane	Name	Nationality	Time	Note
1	3	2	Yordan O'Farrill	Cuba	13.44	Q
2	1	2	Nicholas Hough	Australia	13.51	Q
3	6	8	Wilhem Belocian	France	13.63	Q, PB
4	5	2	James Gladman	Great Britain	13.69	Q
5	6	4	Jussi Kanervo	Finland	13.73	Q
6	8	8	Dondre Echols	United States	13.74	Q
7	4	8	Shinya Tanaka	Japan	13.77	Q, PB
7	7	4	Chu Pengfei	China	13.77	Q
9	3	8	Brahian Peña	Switzerland	13.79	Q
10	4	4	Stefan Fennell	Jamaica	13.81	Q
11	4	3	Cheng Yun-yin	Chinese Taipei	13.82	q
11	6	6	Calvin Arsenault	Canada	13.82	q, PB
13	1	5	Elmo Lakka	Finland	13.84	Q
14	8	2	Yanick Hart	Jamaica	13.87	Q
15	6	3	Lucas Carvalho	Brazil	13.89	q
16	7	7	Máté Gönczöl	Hungary	13.89	Q
17	7	8	Kirill Nevdakh	Russia	13.89	q
18	5	5	Supun Viraj Randeniya	Sri Lanka	13.90	Q, NJ
19	1	3	Ruebin Walters	Trinidad and Tobago	13.92	q, PB
19	3	6	Yaqoub Mohamed Al-Youha	Kuwait	13.92	q
19	8	7	Lorenzo Perini	Italy	13.92	q
22	2	5	Jonas Christen	Germany	13.94	Q
23	6	5	Kittipong Kongdee	Thailand	13.94	q
24	5	3	Sebastian Barth	Germany	13.97	
25	4	2	César Ramírez	Mexico	14.01	
26	3	3	Lorenzo Vergani	Italy	14.03	
27	2	7	Grzegorz Szade	Poland	14.04	Q
27	2	6	Joshua Thompson	United States	14.04	Q
29	3	5	Shunya Takayama	Japan	14.06	PB
30	1	8	Filip Drozdowski	Poland	14.09	
31	5	7	Moussa Mohamed Al-Sabyani	Saudi Arabia	14.13	
32	5	8	Rio Maholtra	Indonesia	14.16	
33	8	3	José Chorro	El Salvador	14.17	
34	8	5	Sebastian Kapferer	Austria	14.21	
35	1	6	Moriel Pitt	Bahamas	14.25	
36	3	7	Maor Szeged	Israel	14.28	
37	6	7	Tre Adderley	Bahamas	14.29	
38	2	4	Diego Lyon	Chile	14.31	
38	5	4	David Franco	Venezuela	14.31	
40	2	3	Valdó Szücs	Hungary	14.32	
40	1	7	Javier Colomo	Spain	14.32	
40	8	6	Marc José	Spain	14.32	
43	6	2	Can Yıldırım	Turkey	14.36	
44	4	6	Mui Ching Yeung	Hong Kong	14.38	
44	5	6	Facundo Andrada	Argentina	14.38	
46	4	5	Gabriel Slythe-Léveillé	Canada	14.40	
46	7	2	Rami Gharsali	Tunisia	14.40	
48	8	4	Angus Julies	South Africa	14.41	
49	3	4	Zlatko Lefterov	Bulgaria	14.42	
49	7	6	Nader Ahmed Al-Haydar	Saudi Arabia	14.42	
51	7	5	Vitali Parakhonka	Belarus	14.47	
52	2	8	Stanislav Ostanin	Kazakhstan	14.84	
53	4	9	FC Pieterse	Namibia	14.93	
54	6	9	Xaysa Anousone	Laos	14.94	PB
55	2	2	Djanny Kina Sielele	France	14.98	
56	1	4	Patricio Colarte	Chile	15.89	
	4	7	Martins Ogierakhi	Nigeria	DNS	
	7	3	Ahmed Keswani	Jordan	DNS	

=== Semi-final ===
Qualification: The first 2 of each heat (Q) and the 2 fastest times (q) qualified

Rank	Heat	Lane	Name	Nationality	Time	Note
1	2	4	Yordan O'Farrill	Cuba	13.28	Q
2	3	6	Wilhem Belocian	France	13.30	Q, NJ
3	3	7	James Gladman	Great Britain	13.37	Q
4	1	6	Nicholas Hough	Australia	13.49	Q
5	2	6	Shinya Tanaka	Japan	13.61	Q, PB
6	3	4	Jussi Kanervo	Finland	13.61	q, NJ
7	2	7	Chu Pengfei	China	13.62	q
8	1	7	Dondre Echols	United States	13.71	Q
9	3	8	Joshua Thompson	United States	13.71	
10	3	3	Ruebin Walters	Trinidad and Tobago	13.73	PB
11	2	8	Cheng Yun-yin	Chinese Taipei	13.73	
12	2	5	Elmo Lakka	Finland	13.74	
13	2	9	Yanick Hart	Jamaica	13.76	
14	1	4	Jonas Christen	Germany	13.76	
15	2	2	Calvin Arsenault	Canada	13.84	
16	1	3	Kirill Nevdakh	Russia	13.85	
17	1	9	Máté Gönczöl	Hungary	13.87	
18	3	5	Brahian Peña	Switzerland	13.90	
19	1	2	Yaqoub Mohamed Al-Youha	Kuwait	13.91	
20	3	3	Lucas Carvalho	Brazil	13.93	
21	1	8	Grzegorz Szade	Poland	14.05	
22	2	3	Lorenzo Perini	Italy	15.07	
–	1	5	Stefan Fennell	Jamaica	–	DSQ
–	3	9	Supun Viraj Randeniya	Sri Lanka	–	DSQ

=== Final ===
Rank	Lane	Name	Nationality	Time	Note
1st place, gold medalist(s)	6	Yordan O'Farrill	Cuba	13.18	CR
2nd place, silver medalist(s)	5	Nicholas Hough	Australia	13.27	AJ
3rd place, bronze medalist(s)	4	Wilhem Belocian	France	13.29	NJ
4	7	James Gladman	Great Britain	13.37	
5	3	Jussi Kanervo	Finland	13.62	
6	9	Dondre Echols	United States	13.71	
7	8	Shinya Tanaka	Japan	13.72	
8	2	Chu Pengfei	China	13.77	

== Participation ==
According to an unofficial count, 56 athletes from 42 countries participated in the event.

- Argentina (1)
- Australia (1)
- Austria (1)
- Bahamas (2)
- Belarus (1)
- Brazil (1)
- Bulgaria (1)
- Canada (2)
- Chile (2)
- China (1)
- Chinese Taipei (1)
- Cuba (1)
- El Salvador (1)
- Finland (2)
- France (2)
- Germany (2)
- Hong Kong (1)
- Hungary (2)
- Indonesia (1)
- Israel (1)
- Italy (2)
- Jamaica (2)
- Japan (2)
- Kazakhstan (1)
- Kuwait (1)
- Laos (1)
- Mexico (1)
- Namibia (1)
- Poland (2)
- Russia (1)
- Saudi Arabia (2)
- South Africa (1)
- Spain (2)
- Sri Lanka (1)
- Switzerland (1)
- Thailand (1)
- Trinidad and Tobago (1)
- Tunisia (1)
- Turkey (1)
- United Kingdom (1)
- United States (2)
- Venezuela (1)
