= 2012 Central American and Caribbean Junior Championships in Athletics =

XIX Central American and Caribbean Junior Championships
- Dates: 29 June – 1 July
- Host city: San Salvador, El Salvador
- Venue: Estadio Jorge "Mágico" González
- Level: Junior and Youth
- Events: 86 (incl. 9 exhibition) (44 junior, 42 youth)
- Participation: 521/467 (234/203 junior, 287/264 youth) athletes from 29 nations

The 19th Central American and Caribbean Junior Championships were held in the Estadio Jorge "Mágico" González in San Salvador, El Salvador, between 29 June and 1 July 2012. The event was open for athletes from the invited countries, that are members of the Central American and Caribbean Athletic Confederation (CACAC), in two categories (newly defined in 2012): Junior A Category: 18 to 19 years as of 31 December 2012 (born either 1993 or 1994), and Junior B Category: 14 to 17 years as of 31 December 2012 (born in 1995, 1996, 1997, or 1998). By IAAF standards, Junior A is equal to Junior, while Junior B is equal to Youth.

There were numerous changes as compared to the last competition held in 2010: The 17-year-old athletes competed in the Junior B category (rather than Junior A). 2000 metres steeplechase was replaced by 3000 metres steeplechase in the female Junior A category. 110 metres hurdles replaced 100 metres hurdles, and 10,000 metres racewalk replaced 5000 metres racewalk in the male Junior B category. And finally, in the female Junior B category, 3000 metres, 2000 metres steeplechase, pole vault, and hammer throw (3 kg) were held for the first time, while 1500 metres replaced 1200 metres, 400 metres hurdles replaced 300 metres hurdles, 5000 metres racewalk replaced 4000 metres racewalk, and new implements for shot put (3 kg rather than 4 kg) and javelin (500 g rather 600 g) were used.

In the Junior A category, a lot of athletes were preparing for the 14th World Junior Championships in Barcelona, Spain on 10–15 July 2012.

A detailed discussion of the results was given elsewhere.

== Records ==
A couple of new championship records were set.

Event	Record	Athlete	Country	Type
Boys Under 20 (Junior)
800 m	1:46.89	Wesley Vázquez	Puerto Rico	CR
110 m hurdles	13.27	Yordan O'Farrill	Cuba	CR
Shot put	19.70 m	Ashinia Miller	Jamaica	CR
Hammer throw	73.96 m	Diego del Real	Mexico	CR
Javelin throw	82.83 m	Keshorn Walcott	Trinidad and Tobago	CR, NR
4 × 100 m relay	39.39	Odean Skeen; Tyquendo Tracey; Senoj-Jay Givans; Jazeel Murphy	Jamaica	CR
Girls Under 20 (Junior)
3000 m steeplechase	11:11.91	Leila Mantilla	Puerto Rico	CR
Javelin throw	55.20 m	Lismania Muñoz	Cuba	CR
Boys Under 18 (Youth)
100 m	10.42 (heat)	Jevaughn Minzie	Jamaica	CR
100 m	10.42 (heat)	Zharnel Hughes	Anguilla	CR
800 m	1:52.40	José Ricardo Jiménez	Mexico	CR
110 m hurdles	13.49	Ruebin Walters	Trinidad and Tobago	CR
400 m hurdles	51.68	Okeen Williams	Jamaica	CR
High jump	2.11 m	Christoff Bryan	Jamaica	CR
Pole vault	4.71 m	Raúl Ríos	Mexico	CR
Shot put	18.92 m	Mario Lozano	Mexico	CR
Javelin throw	51.68	Adrian Williams	Saint Kitts and Nevis	CR
Octathlon	5192 pts	Kevin Roberts	Trinidad and Tobago	CR
10,000 metres walk	46:05.16	Jürgen Grave	Guatemala	CR
4 × 100 m relay	40.17	Michael O'Hara; Raheem Robinson; Gawaine Williams; Jevaughn Minzie	Jamaica	CR
Girls Under 18 (Youth)
1500 m	4:53.65	Faheema Scraders	Bermuda	CR
3000 m	11:10.37	María Aguilar	Costa Rica	CR
400 m hurdles	60.65	Klerianne Estanislao	Puerto Rico	CR
2000 m steeplechase	8:05.04	Alejandra Hernández	Costa Rica	CR
High jump	1.81 m	Akela Jones	Barbados	=CR
Long jump	6.36 m	Akela Jones	Barbados	CR
Pole vault	3.00 m	Andrea Velasco	El Salvador	CR
Pole vault	3.00 m	Catherine Ramos	El Salvador	CR
Shot put (3 kg)	15.04 m	Gleneive Grange	Jamaica	CR
Discus throw (1 kg)	50.24 m	Rosalía Vázquez	Cuba	CR
Hammer throw (3 kg)	52.21 m	Sabrina Gaitan	Guatemala	CR
Javelin throw (500g)	37.56 m	Yulissa de la Rosa	Dominican Republic	CR
Heptathlon	4715 pts	Naomi Urbano	Mexico	CR
5000 m walk	25:02.71	Mildred Raya	Mexico	CR

Key

AR — Area record • CR — Championship record • NR — National record

== Medal summary ==
The results are published. Events marked as "Exhibition" did not meet the official conditions with respect to the minimum number of participants ("not less than five (5) competitors of three (3) countries").

Complete results can also be found on the World Junior Athletics History website.

=== Male Junior A (under 20) ===
Event	Gold		Silver		Bronze	
100 metres (0.9 m/s)	Teray Smith (BAH)	10.58	Tyquendo Tracy (JAM)	10.61	Blake Bartlett (BAH)	10.69
200 metres (−1.2 m/s)	Yoandys Lezcay (CUB)	20.87	Jereem Richards (TRI)	20.98	Blake Bartlett (BAH)	21.33
400 metres	Yoandys Lezcay (CUB)	46.17	Anthonio Mascoll (BAR)	47.10	Shaquille Dill (BER)	47.16
800 metres	Wesley Vázquez (PUR)	1:46.89 CR	Anthonio Mascoll (BAR)	1:50.00	Mark London (TRI)	1:50.98
1500 metres	Wesley Vázquez (PUR)	3:53.91	Víctor Ortíz (CRC)	3:55.03	Jorge Liranzo (CUB)	3:56.06
5000 metres	Víctor Montañés (MEX)	15:14.92	Víctor Santana (PUR)	15:17.55	Edwin Pirir (GUA)	15:19.11
10,000 metres	Víctor Santana (PUR)	32:18.10	Pedro Rivera (PUR)	32:19.47	Edwin Pirir (GUA)	32:21.78
110 metres hurdles (0.0 m/s)	Yordan O'Farrill (CUB)	13.27 CR	Stefan Fennell (JAM)	13.62	Yanick Hart (JAM)	13.75
400 metres hurdles	Jarvarn Gallimore (JAM)	50.83	Shavon Barnes (JAM)	51.05	Brandon Benjamin (TRI)	51.73
3000 m steeplechase (exhibition)	Nestor Mijangos (GUA)	9:50.88	Juan Francisco Feliz (DOM)	10:06.25		
High jump	Kemar Jones (BAR)	1.90m	Theron Niles (AIA)	1.85m		
Pole vault	Víctor Castillero (MEX)	4.60m	Shem Edward (LCA)	4.50m	Javier Romero (ESA)	4.20m
Long jump	Clive Pullen (JAM)	7.20m (−0.4 m/s)	Ifeanyichukwu Otuonye (TCA)	7.19m (−1.2 m/s)	Freddy Juan (DOM)	7.15m (−0.9 m/s)
Triple jump	Pedro Pichardo (CUB)	16.40m (0.6 m/s)	Lathone Collie-Minns (BAH)	16.06m (0.6 m/s)	Steve Waite (TRI)	15.89m (0.4 m/s)
Shot put	Ashinia Miller (JAM)	19.70m CR	Hezekiel Romeo (TRI)	18.59m	Tristan Whitehall (BAR)	16.87m
Discus throw	Fredick Dacres (JAM)	59.99m	Emmanuel Oniya (JAM)	50.75m	Oreste Ortíz (PUR)	48.42m
Hammer throw	Diego del Real (MEX)	73.96m CR	Abraham Parra (MEX)	67.49m	Alexis Figueroa (PUR)	65.95m
Javelin throw	Keshorn Walcott (TRI)	82.83m CR	Alexander Pascal (CAY)	68.84m	Nicolia Bovell (BAR)	68.20m
Decathlon	Lyndon Toussaint (GRN)	6455	Desmond Major (BAH)	5677		
10,000 metres race walk	Jesús Tadeo Vega (MEX)	42:03.68	Erwin González (MEX)	42:16.95	Luis Angel Sánchez (GUA)	43:25.61
4 × 100 metres relay	Jamaica; Odean Skeen; Tyquendo Tracy; Senoj-Jay Givans; Jazeel Murphy	39.39 CR	Bahamas; Teray Smith; Anthony Farrington; Shane Jones; Blake Bartlett	39.80	Trinidad and Tobago; Jereem Richards; Jesse Berkley; Ashron Sobers; Jonathan Holder	39.99
4 × 400 metres relay	Jamaica; Jarvarn Gallimore; Javon Francis; Omar McLeod; Shavon Barnes	3:08.94	Bahamas; Andre Colebrook; Elroy McBride; Julian Munroe; Blake Bartlett	3:10.31	Barbados; Anthonio Mascoll; Kion Joseph; Nikolai Gall; Tremaine Maloney	3:10.73

=== Female Junior A (under 20) ===
Event	Gold		Silver		Bronze	
100 metres (−1.0 m/s)	Fanny Chalas (DOM)	11.53	Deandre Whitehorne (JAM)	11.70	Christania Williams (JAM)	11.71
200 metres (−1.7 m/s)	Fanny Chalas (DOM)	23.79	Shericka Jackson (JAM)	23.87	Jodean Williams (JAM)	24.07
400 metres	Olivia James (JAM)	53.89	Sahily Diago (CUB)	54.20	Kernesha Spann (TRI)	54.52
800 metres	Desreen Montague (JAM)	2:06.43	Sahily Diago (CUB)	2:06.70	Teshon Adderley (BAH)	2:07.21
1500 metres	Alexis Panisse (DOM)	4:36.33	Angelin Figueroa (PUR)	4:56.16	Teshon Adderley (BAH)	4:56.58
3000 metres	Leila Mantilla (PUR)	10:09.50	Angelin Figueroa (PUR)	10:37.99	Taylor Ashley Bean (BER)	11:25.48
5000 metres	Alexis Panisse (DOM)	17:55.67	Mishely González (GUA)	19:50.81	Angela Argueta (ESA)	20:37.50
100 metres hurdles (0.1 m/s)	Sade-Mariah Greenidge (BAR)	13.48	Chrisdale McCarthy (JAM)	13.69	Samantha Scarlett (JAM)	13.78
400 metres hurdles	Kernesha Spann (TRI)	59.09	Devinn Cartwright (BAH)	59.44	Kryshell Rolle (BAH)	1:00.24
3000 m steeplechase (exhibition)	Leila Mantilla (PUR)	11:11.91 CR	Eliza Hernández (MEX)	11:37.37		
High jump	Jeannelle Scheper (LCA)	1.85m	Kimberly Williamson (JAM)	1.85m	Ashleigh Nalty (CAY)	1.70m
Pole vault (exhibition)	Diamara Planell (PUR)	3.95m				
Long jump	Tamara Myers (BAH)	6.02m (1.2 m/s)	Alysbeth Felix (PUR)	5.53m (1.1 m/s)	Rosa Barrera (GUA)	4.90m (1.9 m/s)
Triple jump	Liuba Zaldivar (CUB)	13.78m (−0.4 m/s)	Thea LaFond (DMA)	12.94m (0.4 m/s)	Tamara Myers (BAH)	12.42m (−2.0 m/s)
Shot put	Racquel Williams (BAH)	13.54m	Cymone Hamilton (BAH)	11.94m	Franchely Andino (PUR)	11.49m
Discus throw	Tara-Sue Barnett (JAM)	49.62m	Leah Bannister (BAR)	47.48m	Ashley Arroyo (PUR)	47.43m
Hammer throw	Yolanda González (MEX)	52.89m	Ana Harry (HON)	41.68m	Emma Castillo (GUA)	26.26m
Javelin throw	Lismania Muňóz (CUB)	55.20m CR	Ismaray Armenteros (CUB)	52.95m	Ana Sofia Salas (MEX)	49.18m
Heptathlon	Shavonte Bradshaw (BAR)	4365	Dee-Ann Rogers (AIA)	4126	Ismeralys Pie (DOM)	3935
5000 metres race walk	Alejandra Ortega (MEX)	23:21.71	Yaneli Caballero (MEX)	23:44.50	Yesenia Miranda (ESA)	25:21.87
4 × 100 metres relay (Exhibition)	Jamaica; Monique Spencer; Christania Williams; Deandre Whitehorne; Shawnette Lewin	44.51	El Salvador; María Renee Gómez; Fatima Aguirre; Jessica López; Elia Lazo	55.15		
4 × 400 metres relay	Jamaica; Desreen Montague; Olivia James; Shericka Jackson; Titania Markland	3:37.21	Bahamas; Devinn Cartwright; Kryshell Rolle; Rashan Brown; Teshon Adderley	3:43.28	Dominican Republic; Evilin del Carmen; Fanny Chalas; Ismeralys Pie; Alexis Panisse	3:54.06

=== Male Junior B (under 18) ===
Event	Gold		Silver		Bronze	
100 metres (−0.6 m/s)	Jevaughn Minzie (JAM)	10.46	Zharnel Hughes (AIA)	10.46	Cejhae Greene (ATG)	10.58
200 metres (−1.5 m/s)	Zharnel Hughes (AIA)	20.98	Jevaughn Minzie (JAM)	21.02	Cejhae Greene (ATG)	21.14
400 metres	Machel Cedenio (TRI)	47.36	Theon Lewis (TRI)	48.11	José Ricardo Jiménez (MEX)	48.21
800 metres	José Ricardo Jiménez (MEX)	1:52.40 CR	Andrés Arroyo (PUR)	1:52.73	Jerrard Mason (BAR)	1:52.90
1500 metres	Andrés Arroyo (PUR)	3:57.32	Marbeq Edgar (LCA)	4:02.38	Luis Solórzano (ESA)	4:05.29
3000 metres	Luis Solórzano (ESA)	8:58.36	John Carlos Torres (PUR)	8:59.25	Joshua Correa (PUR)	9:05.93
2000 metres steeplechase	Andrés González (PUR)	6:27.57	Giovannie Rivera (PUR)	6:28.05	David Alexander Escobar (ESA)	6:32.24
110 metres hurdles (−0.5 m/s)	Ruebin Walters (TRI)	13.49 CR	Tyler Mason (JAM)	13.50	Michael O'Hara (JAM)	13.65
400 metres hurdles	Okeen Williams (JAM)	51.68 CR	Ruebin Walters (TRI)	52.45	Dario Scantlebury (BAR)	52.73
High jump	Christoff Bryan (JAM)	2.11 CR	Arturo Abascal (MEX)	2.08	Clairvon Kelly (SKN)	1.93
Pole vault	Raúl Ríos (MEX)	4.71 CR	Alejandro Melara (ESA)	4.05	José San Miguel (PUR)	4.00
Long jump	Andwuelle Wright (TRI)	7.07 (−0.4 m/s)	Laquan Nairn (BAH)	6.89 (−0.1 m/s)	Trae Carey (BAH)	6.89 (−0.3 m/s)
Triple jump	Ashton Butler (BAH)	15.06 (0.3 m/s)	Justin Donawa (BER)	14.49 (−0.3 m/s)	Kadean Cayetano (BIZ)	13.19 (0.2 m/s)
Shot put	Mario Lozano (MEX)	18.92 CR	Demar Gayle (JAM)	17.64	Shervorne Worrell (TRI)	17.04
Discus throw	Kenejah Williams (TRI)	50.58	Shervorne Worrell (TRI)	47.95	Khyle Higgs (BAH)	47.60
Hammer throw (Exhibition)	Otto Vivas Juarez (GUA)	47.57	Magno Escobar (GUA)	45.78		
Javelin throw	Adrian Williams (SKN)	68.41 CR	Orlando Thomas (JAM)	64.69	Anderson Peters (GRN)	63.79
Octathlon	Kevin Roberts (TRI)	5192 CR	Victor Isaac (TRI)	5000	Andrés Acosta (CRC)	4983
10,000 metres walk	Jürgen Grave (GUA)	46:05.16 CR	José Meléndez (PUR)	47:16.45	Alcides Rosales (ESA)	51:07.48
4 × 100 metres relay	Jamaica; Michael O'Hara; Raheem Robinson; Gawaine Williams; Jevaughn Minzie	40.17 CR	Dominican Republic; Stanly del Carmen; Brailin Paulino; Juander Santos; Valentin Martínez	41.57	Bahamas; Cliff Resias; Janeko Cartwright; Delano Davis; Rashad Gibson	41.61
4 × 400 metres relay	Trinidad and Tobago; Asa Guevara; Machel Cedenio; Ruebin Walters; Theon Lewis	3:11.66	Barbados; Levi Cadogan; Mario Burke; Dario Scantlebury; Jerrard Mason	3:14.31	Puerto Rico; Elmer Fuentes; Edwin Diononet; Luis Rivera; Ricardo Feliciano	3:14.78

=== Female Junior B (under 18) ===
Event	Gold		Silver		Bronze	
100 metres (-1.1 m/s)	Carmiesha Cox (BAH)	11.70	Nelda Huggins (IVB)	11.83	Devynne Charlton (BAH)	11.97
200 metres (-1.2 m/s)	Saqukine Cameron (JAM)	24.10	Carmiesha Cox (BAH)	24.18	Natalliah Whyte (JAM)	24.35
400 metres	Tiffany James (JAM)	55.09	Tia-Adana Belle (BAR)	55.92	Renika Daniel (SKN)	56.13
800 metres	Faheema Scraders (BER)	2:12.57	Hannia Palafox (MEX)	2:12.90	Mariana Pérez (DOM)	2:18.76
1500 metres	Faheema Scraders (BER)	4:53.65 CR	María Aguilar (CRC)	4:56.61	Josselyn Grijalva (ESA)	5:02.30
3000 metres (Exhibition)	María Aguilar (CRC)	11:10.37 CR	Alejandra Hernández (CRC)	12:23.77		
2000 metres steeplechase (Exhibition)	Alejandra Hernández (CRC)	8:05.04 CR	Sara Palacios (ESA)	8:17.33	Xiomara Aleman (ESA)	8:44.33
100 metres hurdles (0.1 m/s)	Shakera Hall (BAR)	13.53	Tishanna Montieth (JAM)	13.55	Devynne Charlton (BAH)	13.77
400 metres hurdles	Klerianne Estanislao (PUR)	60.65 CR	Tia-Adana Belle (BAR)	60.68	Shakera Hall (BAR)	60.82
High jump	Akela Jones (BAR)	1.81 =CR	Ximena Esquivel (MEX)	1.78	Safia Morgan (JAM); Krista-Gay Taylor (JAM)	1.69
Pole vault (Exhibition)	Andrea Velasco (ESA)	3.00 CR	Catherine Ramos (ESA)	3.00 CR		
Long jump	Akela Jones (BAR)	6.36 CR (0.1 m/s)	Paula Álvarez (CUB)	6.17 (0.7 m/s)	Claudette Allen (JAM)	5.87 (-1.0 m/s)
Triple jump	Tamara Moncrieffe (JAM)	12.16 (-0.7 m/s)	Mayeli López (DOM)	12.03 (-0.2 m/s)	Taryn Rolle (BAH)	11.77 (-0.6 m/s)
Shot put	Gleneive Grange (JAM)	15.04 CR	Trevia Gumbs (IVB)	14.75	Chelsea James (TRI)	13.93
Discus throw	Rosalía Vázquez (CUB)	50.24 CR	Gleneive Grange (JAM)	46.51	Brashae Wood (BAH)	38.30
Hammer throw (Exhibition)	Sabrina Gaitan (GUA)	52.21 CR	Guadalupe Cartajena (GUA)	27.63		
Javelin throw	Yulissa de la Rosa (DOM)	37.56 CR	Gleneive Grange (JAM)	37.46	Akidah Briggs (TRI)	36.85
Heptathlon	Naomi Urbano (MEX)	4715 CR	Keith Agosto (PUR)	4678	Amelia Gillispie (CAY)	4263
5000 metres Walk	Mildred Raya (MEX)	25:02.71 CR	Irene Barrondo (GUA)	26:33.70	Karin Vicente (GUA)	27:01.74
4 × 100 metres relay	Jamaica; Natalliah Whyte; Saqukine Cameron; Chanice Bonner; Claudette Allen	45.53	Bahamas; Kadeisha Hield; Devynne Charlton; Makeya Whyte; Carmiesha Cox	45.72	Trinidad and Tobago; Kayelle Clarke; Tsai-Ann Joseph; Aaliyah Telesford; Zakiya Denoon	46.24
4 × 400 metres relay	Jamaica; Asaine Hall; Genekee Leith; Saqukine Cameron; Tiffany James	3:43.41	El Salvador; Beatriz Flamenco; Gabriela Castillo; Katia Pozuelo; Sofia Carias	4:07.23	Guatemala; Andrea Lemus; Cora Gutiérrez; María Bac; Sefora Ramírez	4:32.06

== Medal table ==
The published medal count is based on 77 events, and does not include the events indicated above as exhibition.

* Host nation (El Salvador)

Rank	Nation	Gold	Silver	Bronze	Total
1	Jamaica (JAM)	20	15	9	44
2	Mexico (MEX)	11	6	2	19
3	Trinidad and Tobago (TTO)	8	6	9	23
4	Puerto Rico (PUR)	7	10	7	24
5	Cuba (CUB)	7	4	1	12
6	Barbados (BAR)	6	6	6	18
7	Bahamas (BAH)	5	10	13	28
8	Dominican Republic (DOM)	5	2	4	11
9	Bermuda (BER)	2	1	2	5
10	El Salvador (ESA)*	1	3	7	11
11	Commonwealth Games Federation (CGF)	1	3	0	4
12	Guatemala (GUA)	1	2	7	10
13	Saint Lucia (LCA)	1	2	0	3
14	Saint Kitts and Nevis (SKN)	1	0	2	3
15	Grenada (GRN)	1	0	1	2
16	Costa Rica (CRC)	0	2	1	3
17	British Virgin Islands (IVB)	0	2	0	2
18	Cayman Islands (CAY)	0	1	2	3
19	Dominica (DMA)	0	1	0	1
19	Honduras (HON)	0	1	0	1
19	Turks and Caicos Islands (TKS)	0	1	0	1
22	Antigua and Barbuda (ATG)	0	0	2	2
23	Belize (BIZ)	0	0	1	1
Totals (23 entries)		77	78	76	231

== Participation (unofficial) ==
Different numbers were published. One source announces 526 athletes from 28 countries. Another source reports the participation of 652 athletes and officials. This is in agreement with the officially published team roster, comprising 521 athletes and 131 officials from 29 countries. Working through the results, an unofficial count yields the number of about 467 athletes (203 junior, 264 youth) in the start list. Following, the numbers in brackets refer to (athletes in published team roster/athletes in start list):

- Anguilla (4/3)
- Antigua and Barbuda (5/4)
- Aruba (1)
- Bahamas (48/44)
- Barbados (22/21)
- Belize (9/6)
- Bermuda (11/12)
- British Virgin Islands (12/10)
- Cayman Islands (6)
- Costa Rica (21/19)
- Cuba (12/11)
- Curaçao (10/5)
- Dominica (4/1)
- Dominican Republic (22/21)
- El Salvador (46/45)
- Grenada (3)
- Guatemala (51/42)
- (Haiti) Haïti (3/1)
- Honduras (9/7)
- Jamaica (70/58)
- (Mexico) México (39/37)
- Nicaragua (5/4)
- Puerto Rico (38)
- Saint Kitts and Nevis (14/15)
- Saint Lucia (4)
- Saint Vincent and the Grenadines (5)
- Trinidad and Tobago (41)
- Turks and Caicos Islands (2/1)
- U.S. Virgin Islands (4/2)
