= 2010 Oceania Youth Athletics Championships =

X World Youth Athletics Championships
- Dates: March 11–14
- Host city: Sydney, New South Wales, Australia
- Venue: Sydney Olympic Park Athletic Centre
- Level: World
- Events: 42 (21 boys, 21 girls)
- Participation: 383 (203 boys, 180 girls) athletes from 18 (17 + 8 Australian States and Territories) nations

The 2010 Oceanian Youth Athletics Championships were held at the Sydney Olympic Park Athletic Centre in Homebush, New South Wales, Australia, between March 11–14, 2010. They were held together with the 2010 Australian Junior Athletics Championships (U14 to U20). A total of 42 events were contested, 21 by boys and 21 by girls. Two highlights of the games were u20 boy athlete Damien Birkenhead winning the shot put with a throw of 21.72m and u18 girl athlete Sarah Jackson winning the 400m sprint in a time of 53:61 seconds.

== Medal summary ==
Complete results can be found on the websites of the Oceania Athletics Association, and of the World Junior Athletics History webpage.

=== Boys under 18 (Youth) ===
Event	Gold		Silver		Bronze	
100 metres (wind: 0.0 m/s)	(New South Wales) Nicholas Hough (NSW)	10.83	(South Australia) Derek Mai (SA)	11.09	Yarride Rosario (NZL)	11.10
200 metres (wind: −2.9 m/s)	(New South Wales) Nicholas Hough (NSW)	21.79	(New South Wales) Ben Jaworski (NSW)	21.91	(South Australia) Michael Brusnahan (SA)	22.13
400 metres	(Victoria (state)) Luke Greco (VIC)	49.13	(New South Wales) Ian Halpin (NSW)	49.33	(Western Australia) Hayden Yates (WA)	49.34
800 metres	Brad Mathas (NZL)	1:52.19	(Victoria (state)) Joel Hogarth (VIC)	1:52.97	(New South Wales) Ozner Abdullah (NSW)	1:53.29
1000 metres	(Victoria (state)) Rick Whitehead (VIC)	2:30.39	(Western Australia) Tim Richards (WA)	2:31.48	(Queensland) Rorey Hunter (QLD)	2:31.79
1500 metres	(Victoria (state)) Shaun Geraghty (VIC)	3:55.93	(Queensland) Jack Curran (QLD)	3:56.60	(New South Wales) Jesse Beadman (NSW)	3:56.80
3000 metres	Mohamed Ali (NZL)	8:40.23	(Victoria (state)) Milaan Lottering (VIC)	8:42.87	(Victoria (state)) Jesse Ramirez (VIC)	8:43.66
2000 metres steeplechase	(Queensland) Grant Gwynne (QLD)	6:09.19	(New South Wales) Andrew Selosse (NSW)	6:11.34	(Victoria (state)) Seamus Murphy (VIC)	6:12.59
110 metres hurdles (wind: −1.8 m/s)	(New South Wales) Nicholas Hough (NSW)	13.87	Joshua Hawkins (NZL)	14.20	(Queensland) James Woodgate (QLD)	14.41
400 metres hurdles	(Western Australia) Raheen Williams (WA)	52.74	(South Australia) Jack Harvey (SA)	53.31	Campbell Wu (NZL)	53.39
High jump	(New South Wales) Brandon Starc (NSW)	2.06	(Queensland) Bradley Hebbard (QLD)	1.99	(New South Wales) Miles Cole-Clark (NSW)	1.99
Pole vault	(Victoria (state)) Brodie Cross (VIC)	4.65	(Victoria (state)) Keith Wrzuszczak (VIC)	4.15	(Victoria (state)) Lewis Seccombe (VIC)	3.70
Long jump	(New South Wales) Kurt Jenner (NSW)	7.18	(New South Wales) Tom Soliman (NSW)	7.07	Jesse Bryant (NZL)	6.91
Triple jump	(Victoria (state)) Frank Brisevac (VIC)	14.22	Reginald Monagi (PNG)	14.06	(Queensland) Alex Ypinazar (QLD)	13.91
Shot put	Jacko Gill (NZL)	20.62	(Victoria (state)) Damien Birkenhead (VIC)	20.17	(New South Wales) Connor Sherlock (NSW)	17.69
Discus throw	Jacko Gill (NZL)	56.64	(New South Wales) Aiden Anderson (NSW)	51.99	(Victoria (state)) Damien Birkenhead (VIC)	51.97
Hammer throw	(Victoria (state)) Damien Birkenhead (VIC)	67.88	(Queensland) Robert Johnston (QLD)	60.88	(Queensland) David Rakoci (QLD)	55.80
Javelin throw	(New South Wales) Elliott Lang (NSW)	67.47	(Northern Territory) Dylan Risk (NT)	67.33	(Victoria (state)) Luke Cann (VIC)	66.98
5000 metres Walk	(South Australia) Blake Steele (SA)	21:49.66	(Victoria (state)) Brad Simpson (VIC)	24:00.19	Matthew Holcroft (NZL)	24:21.24
4 × 100 metres relay	New South Wales; Michael Rumiz; Nicholas Hough; Jarrod Geddes; Ben Jaworski	41.36	Queensland; Ashley Sommerfield; Hugh Donovan; James Woodgate; Lucas Hughes	42.24	South Australia; Brett Richards; Jack Harvey; Edward McLeish; Michael Brusnahan	42.51
4 × 400 metres relay	New South Wales; Christian Lozada; Jackson Lowe; Jarrod Geddes; Steven Solomon	3:20.10	Victoria; Jack Sheridan; James Smith; Sean Hendricks; Luke Greco	3:20.66	New Zealand; Phil Simms; Brad Mathas; Mohamed Ali; Campbell Wu	3:21.51

=== Girls under 18 (Youth) ===
Event	Gold		Silver		Bronze	
100 metres (wind: 0.5 m/s)	(Victoria (state)) Ashleigh Whittaker (VIC)	12.04	(Victoria (state)) Ellia Green (VIC)	12.12	(Victoria (state)) Michelle Jenneke (VIC)	12.15
200 metres (wind: −0.9 m/s)	(Victoria (state)) Monica Brennan (VIC)	24.75	Hazel Bowering Scott (NZL)	25.05	(New South Wales) Rebecca Watts (NSW)	25.16
400 metres	(Queensland) Louise Maybury (QLD)	55.69	(New South Wales) Phoebe Davies (NSW)	55.74	Madison Gipson (NZL)	56.61
800 metres	(New South Wales) Eliza Barton (NSW)	2:11.02	(South Australia) Jess Rowe (SA)	2:11.07	(Queensland) Odelle Wolfenden (QLD)	2:11.69
1000 metres	(New South Wales) Jenny Blundell (NSW)	2:45.68	Rebekah Greene (NZL)	2:45.99	(Australian Capital Territory) Sophie Greig (ACT)	2:53.38
1500 metres	(South Australia) Eleanor Wardlewort (SA)	4:38.26	(Victoria (state)) Sophie Perry (VIC)	4:39.23	(New South Wales) Hannah Menday (NSW)	4:39.33
3000 metres	Rebekah Greene (NZL)	9:53.14	Anna-Lisa Uttley (NZL)	9:55.30	(Victoria (state)) Melanie Townsend (VIC)	10:05.17
2000 metres steeplechase	(South Australia) Eleanor Wardlewort (SA)	6:53.83	Jenna Hansen (NZL)	7:23.89	(Queensland) Isis Flynn-Pittar (QLD)	7:30.27
100 metres hurdles (wind: −1.4 m/s)	(New South Wales) Michelle Jenneke (NSW)	14.12	(New South Wales) Natalie Ferris (NSW)	14.43	(New South Wales) Lisa Celi (NSW)	14.44
400 metres hurdles	(New South Wales) Lisa Celi (NSW)	61.23	(Queensland) Tatum Shaw (QLD)	62.04	(Victoria (state)) Ellie Macdonald (VIC)	62.47
High jump	(New South Wales) Amy Pejkovic (NSW)	1.86	(Tasmania) Kaitlin Morgan (TAS)	1.78	(Queensland) Demii Maher-Smith (QLD)	1.78
Pole vault	(Western Australia) Liz Parnov (WA)	3.95	(Victoria (state)) Rebecca Marchant (VIC)	3.85	(Victoria (state)) Paris McCathrion (VIC)	3.70
Long jump	(Queensland) Demii Maher-Smith (QLD)	5.90	Portia Bing (NZL)	5.81	(New South Wales) Courtney Cross (NSW)	5.76
Triple jump	(Queensland) Demii Maher-Smith (QLD)	12.61	(Victoria (state)) Brooke Stratton (VIC)	12.60	(Tasmania) Kaitlin Morgan (TAS)	12.23
Shot put	(Victoria (state)) Rai Prabhjot (VIC)	13.58	Siositina Hakeai (NZL)	13.43	(New South Wales) Chelsea Sutherton-Valeni (NSW)	12.78
Discus throw	Merewarahi Vaka (NZL)	49.18	Leesa Lealaisalanoa (NZL)	47.80	Siositina Hakeai (NZL)	47.61
Hammer throw	Julia Ratcliffe (NZL)	53.31	(Tasmania) Danielle McConnell (TAS)	49.69	(Tasmania) Mikayla Genge (TAS)	46.87
Javelin throw	(Victoria (state)) Chelsea Dyer (VIC)	41.39	(Victoria (state)) Sophie Lichoudaris (VIC)	39.21	Patricia Taea (COK)	38.07
5000 metres Walk	(South Australia) Kristie Goznik (SA)	25:26.73	(Victoria (state)) Jmara Hockley Samon (VIC)	25:52.92	(Queensland) Alana Hewish (QLD)	25:55.69
4 × 100 metres relay	New South Wales; Michelle Jenneke; Ella Nelson; Rebecca Watts; Karlie Morton	45.75	Victoria; Ellia Green; Monica Brennan; Angela Byrne; Ashleigh Whittaker	45.83	Queensland; Tatum Shaw; Carla Williams; Monique Hastie; Demii Maher-Smith	47.27
4 × 400 metres relay	New South Wales; Karlie Chambers; Tahlia Hunter; Jacarna Bain-Fenton; Phoebe Davies	3:47.36	Queensland; Eliza Bowers; Ashleigh Harris; Eve Lineham; Louise Maybury	3:47.43	Victoria; Renee Doggett; Erin Rayner; Kate Ryan; Alexandra Bulic	3:53.98

== Medal table (unofficial) ==
* Host nation (New South Wales)

Rank	Nation	Gold	Silver	Bronze	Total
1	New South Wales*	15	7	9	31
2	Victoria	10	13	10	33
3	New Zealand	7	8	7	22
4	Queensland	4	6	9	19
5	South Australia	4	3	2	9
6	Western Australia	2	1	1	4
7	Tasmania	0	2	2	4
8	Northern Territory	0	1	0	1
8	Papua New Guinea	0	1	0	1
10	Australian Capital Territory	0	0	1	1
10	Cook Islands	0	0	1	1
Totals (11 entries)		42	42	42	126

== Participation (unofficial) ==
An unofficial count yields the number of about 383 athletes from 18 countries. 309 athletes were from the 8 Australian States and Territories:

- Australian Capital Territory
- New South Wales
- Northern Territory
- Queensland
- South Australia
- Tasmania
- Victoria
- Western Australia

and 74 athletes from 17 other OAA member and associate member countries:

- American Samoa (2)
- Cook Islands (2)
- Fiji (7)
- French Polynesia (5)
- Guam (4)
- Kiribati (2)
- Marshall Islands (1)
- Federated States of Micronesia (1)
- Nauru (2)
- New Caledonia (6)
- New Zealand (29)
- Northern Mariana Islands (3)
- Palau (2)
- Papua New Guinea (3)
- Samoa (3)
- Tonga (1)
- Tuvalu (1)
