= Todd Gurley =

American football player (born 1994)

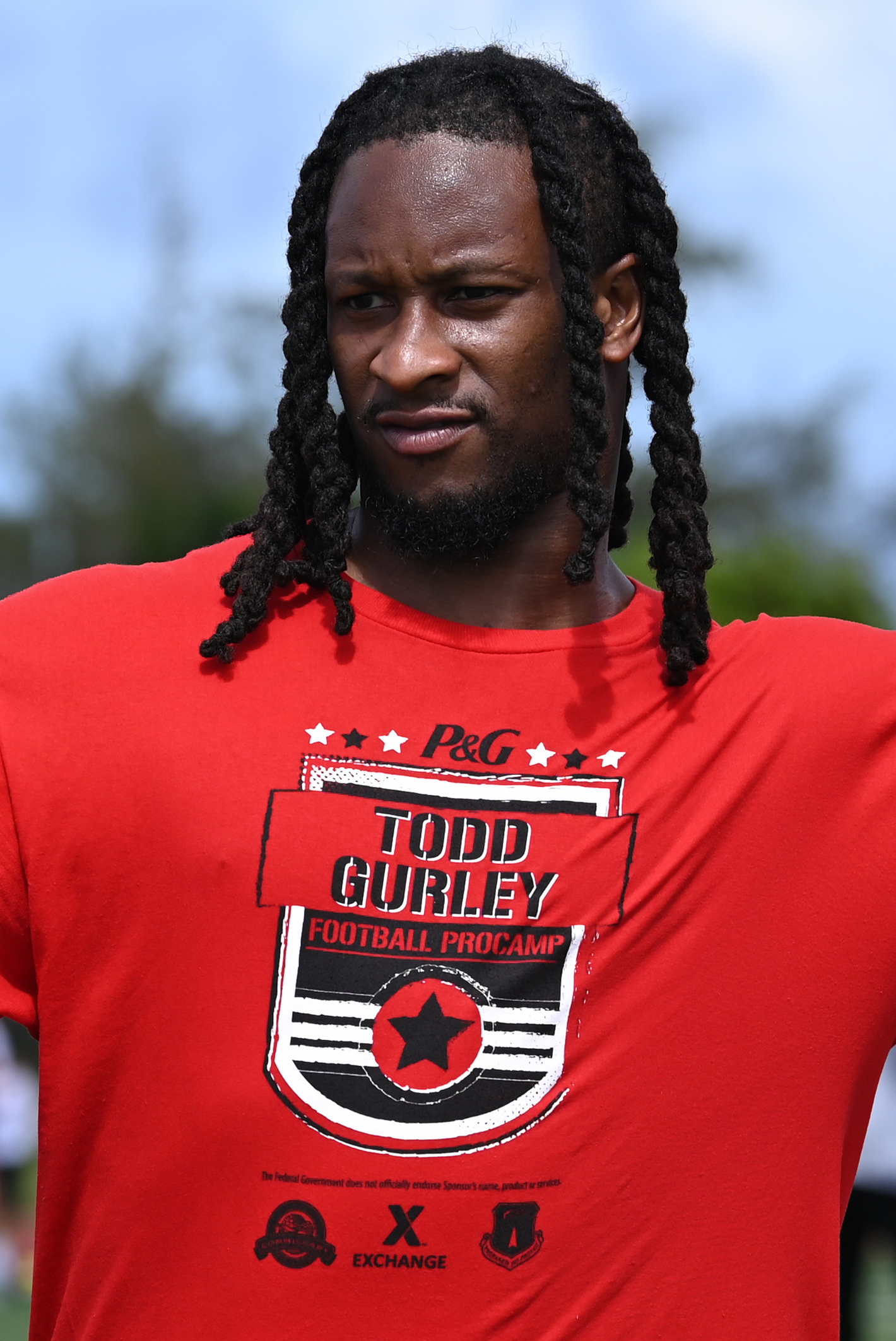
- Gurley in 2022

No. 30, 21
- Position: Running back

Personal information
- Born: August 3, 1994 (age 32); Baltimore, Maryland, U.S.
- Listed height: 6 ft 1 in (1.85 m)
- Listed weight: 224 lb (102 kg)

Career information
- High school: Tarboro (Tarboro, North Carolina)
- College: Georgia (2012–2014)
- NFL draft: 2015: 1st round, 10th overall pick

Career history

Playing
- St. Louis / Los Angeles Rams (2015–2019); Atlanta Falcons (2020)

Operations
- FCF Beasts (2022–present) Owner

Awards and highlights
- NFL Offensive Player of the Year (2017); NFL Offensive Rookie of the Year (2015); 2× First-team All-Pro (2017, 2018); Second-team All-Pro (2015); 3× Pro Bowl (2015, 2017, 2018); 2× NFL rushing touchdowns leader (2017, 2018); PFWA All-Rookie Team (2015); First-team All-SEC (2012); Second-team All-SEC (2013)

Career NFL statistics
- Rushing yards: 6,082
- Rushing average: 4.2
- Rushing touchdowns: 67
- Receptions: 243
- Receiving yards: 2,254
- Receiving touchdowns: 12
- Stats at Pro Football Reference

Todd Jerome Gurley II (born August 3, 1994) is an American former professional football running back who played in the National Football League (NFL) for six seasons, primarily with the Los Angeles Rams. He played college football for the Georgia Bulldogs, earning first-team All-SEC honors, and was selected by the Rams 10th overall in the 2015 NFL draft.

Gurley immediately made an impact in his first season by rushing for over 1,000 yards and winning Offensive Rookie of the Year. From 2017 to 2018, he twice led the league in rushing touchdowns and was named AP NFL Offensive Player of the Year in the former. He also received three Pro Bowl and two first-team All-Pro selections.

During the 2018 playoffs, Gurley began to struggle with injuries that led to the Rams releasing him after the 2019 season. He played for the Atlanta Falcons the following year in 2020. Gurley announced his retirement in 2022 after spending a year in free agency.

== Early life ==
Todd Jerome Gurley II was born in Baltimore, Maryland. He attended Tarboro High School in Tarboro, North Carolina, where he was a three-sport star in football, basketball, and track. He played running back and defensive back for the Vikings during his junior season, totalling 1,472 rushing yards and 26 touchdowns, as well as 79 tackles, an interception, and a forced fumble. He was named Rocky Mount Telegram All-Area Offensive Player of the Year for the 2010 season. As a senior in 2011, he was the North Carolina Associated Press (AP) Player of the Year after totaling 2,600 yards and 38 touchdowns. As a senior, Gurley helped the Vikings football team win the 2A North Carolina state championship, rushing for 242 yards and four touchdowns in the championship game against Lincolnton High School.

Gurley was also a world-class hurdler and sprinter for the school's track & field team. He competed for Team USA in the 110-metres hurdles at the 2011 World Youth Championships in Athletics, where he placed 3rd in the prelims with a career-best time of 13.66 seconds, but finished 15th overall in the semifinals. Also a top competitor in the 100-meter dash, he ran a personal-best time of 10.70 seconds in the prelims of the 2011 NCHSAA 2A state track meet, placing 2nd.

Gurley was considered a four-star recruit by Rivals.com, and was listed as the fifth best running back in his class. He committed to the University of Georgia to play college football under then-head coach Mark Richt.

College recruiting
Name	Hometown	School	Height	Weight	40^{‡}	Commit date
Todd Gurley; RB	Tarboro, NC	Tarboro High School	6 ft 1 in (1.85 m)	205 lb (93 kg)	4.40	Jan 13, 2012
Todd Gurley; RB	Recruit ratings: Scout: Rivals: 247Sports: ESPN:					
Overall recruit ranking: Scout: 13 (RB) Rivals: 5 (RB) 247Sports: 6 (RB) ESPN: 22 (ATH)
Note: In many cases, Scout, Rivals, 247Sports, On3, and ESPN may conflict in their listings of height and weight.; In these cases, the average was taken. ESPN grades are on a 100-point scale.; Sources: "Georgia Football Commitments". Rivals.; "2012 Georgia Football Commits". Scout.; "ESPN". ESPN.; "Scout.com Team Recruiting Rankings". Scout.; "2012 Team Ranking". Rivals.com.

== College career ==
=== 2012 season ===
Gurley became an immediate contributor to the Bulldogs' backfield as a freshman in their 12–2 season. In his first game against the Buffalo Bulls, he rushed for 100 yards on eight carries with two rushing touchdowns. In addition, he had a 100-yard kickoff return for a touchdown in the 45–23 home victory. Gurley took over as the starter the second game of the season against Southeastern Conference (SEC) East opponent Missouri and rushed for 65 yards on 10 carries in the 41–20 victory. In the following game against FAU, he had 10 carries for 111 rushing yards and one rushing touchdown in the 56–20 victory. The next week, he had 16 carries for 130 rushing yards and two rushing touchdowns in a 48–3 victory over Vanderbilt. In the following week's rivalry game against Tennessee, he had 24 carries for 130 rushing yards and three rushing touchdowns in the 51–44 victory. On October 27, against Florida, he had 27 carries for 118 rushing yards and one rushing touchdown in the 17–9 victory in the World's Largest Outdoor Cocktail Party. On November 3, against Ole Miss, he had 18 carries for 117 rushing yards in the 37–10 victory. In the following rivalry game against Auburn, he had 11 carries for 116 rushing yards and a rushing touchdown in the 38–0 victory. In the next game against Georgia Southern, Gurley became the second true freshman in Georgia history to rush for 1,000 yards, the only other being Herschel Walker in 1980. In the regular season finale against rival Georgia Tech, he had 12 carries for 97 rushing yards and two rushing touchdowns in the 42–10 victory. Georgia won the SEC East and faced off against Alabama in the SEC Championship. In the 32–28 loss, he had 23 carries for 122 rushing yards and two rushing touchdowns. Georgia ended up qualifying for the Capital One Bowl against Nebraska. In the 45–31 victory, he had 23 carries for 125 rushing yards and one rushing touchdown.

In the 2012 season, Gurley started 12 of 14 games and rushed for 1,385 yards on 222 carries with 17 rushing touchdowns. His 17 rushing touchdowns finished tied for third in a single season in school history. Gurley finished second in the SEC in rushing yards, only trailing Johnny Manziel. After the season, Gurley was named First-Team All-SEC by the AP. He was one of two true freshman running backs to accomplish this feat in 2012, the other player being T. J. Yeldon of Alabama.

=== 2013 season ===
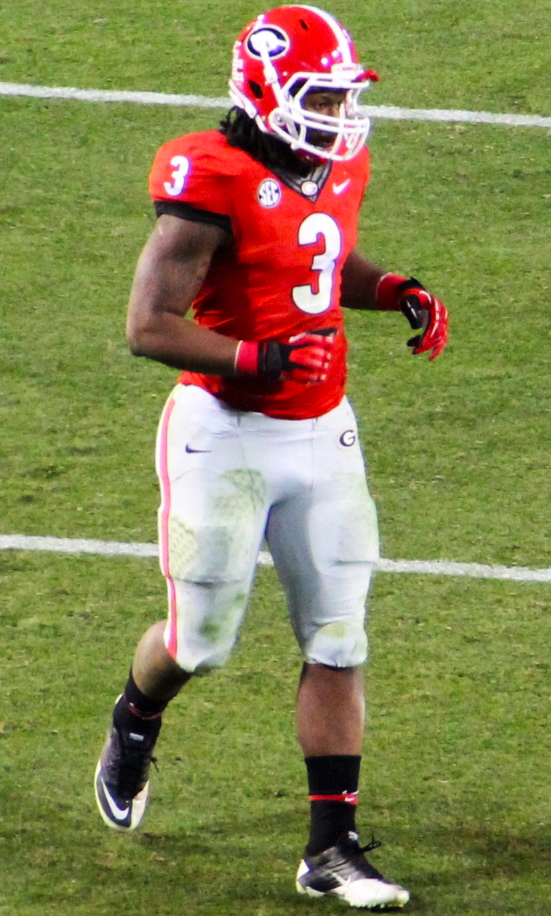
Gurley with the Bulldogs in 2013

Gurley saw an expanded role in Georgia's receiving game in their 8–5 season in 2013. On August 31, in Georgia's season opener at Clemson's Memorial Stadium, Gurley led the Bulldogs with a career-high 154 rushing yards on 12 carries and two rushing touchdowns. Even though the Bulldogs lost the game 38–35, Gurley had an impressive performance against Clemson which included a 75-yard touchdown run early in the first quarter. In the following game against rival South Carolina, he had 30 carries for 132 rushing yards and one rushing touchdown to go along with an eight-yard receiving touchdown in the 41–30 victory. On November 2, against Florida, he had 17 carries for 100 rushing yards and a rushing touchdown to go along with three receptions for 87 receiving yards and one receiving touchdown in the 23–20 victory. On November 30, against Georgia Tech, he had 20 carries for 122 rushing yards and three rushing touchdowns to go along with four receptions for 36 receiving yards and one receiving touchdown in the 41–34 victory. In the 2014 Gator Bowl against Nebraska, he had 86 rushing yards and 97 receiving yards and a receiving touchdown in the 24–19 loss. In ten games, he rushed for 989 rushing yards on 165 carries with ten rushing touchdowns to go along with 37 receptions for 441 receiving yards and six receiving touchdowns. He led the team in all major rushing categories and receiving touchdowns. After the season, Gurley was named Second-Team All-SEC by the AP.

In the spring of 2013, Gurley joined the Georgia Bulldogs indoor track team. He competed in the 60-meter hurdles, and recorded the seventh-fastest time in school history at 8.12 seconds, to take sixth place at the VT Elite Meet.

=== 2014 season ===
Georgia's 10–3 season in 2014 saw some unfortunate circumstances arise for Gurley in terms of compliance and injury. In the season opener against Clemson on August 30, Gurley rushed for 198 yards and three touchdowns on 15 carries to go along with a 100-yard kickoff return touchdown in the 45–21 victory. On September 27, against Tennessee, he had 28 carries for 208 rushing yards and two rushing touchdowns in the 35–32 victory. His 208 rushing yards were the most in a single game by a Georgia running back since Garrison Hearst had 246 against Vanderbilt in 1992. On October 9, Gurley was indefinitely suspended by the University of Georgia over an alleged violation of NCAA rules. It only took two days of investigation to determine that Gurley had received $3,000 over two years for signed autographs and memorabilia. Gurley missed the Missouri and Arkansas games before the NCAA upheld its decision to suspend Gurley for four total games. Gurley sat out for two more games until he was eligible to play against Auburn in their annual rivalry game. In his first game back from suspension on November 15, Gurley tore his ACL against Auburn, ending his junior season and his career at the University of Georgia. He finished the 2014 season with 123 carries for 911 rushing yards and nine rushing touchdowns in six games. Gurley decided to forego his senior season and entered the 2015 NFL draft. His 3,285 rushing yards ranked second and his 36 rushing touchdowns tied for second in school history at the time of his departure from Georgia.

== Professional career ==
Pre-draft measurables
Height	Weight	Arm length	Hand span	Wingspan	Bench press	Wonderlic
6 ft 0 5/8 in (1.84 m)	222 lb (101 kg)	31 1/2 in (0.80 m)	10 in (0.25 m)	6 ft 4 3/8 in (1.94 m)	17 reps	12
All values from NFL Combine

=== St. Louis / Los Angeles Rams ===
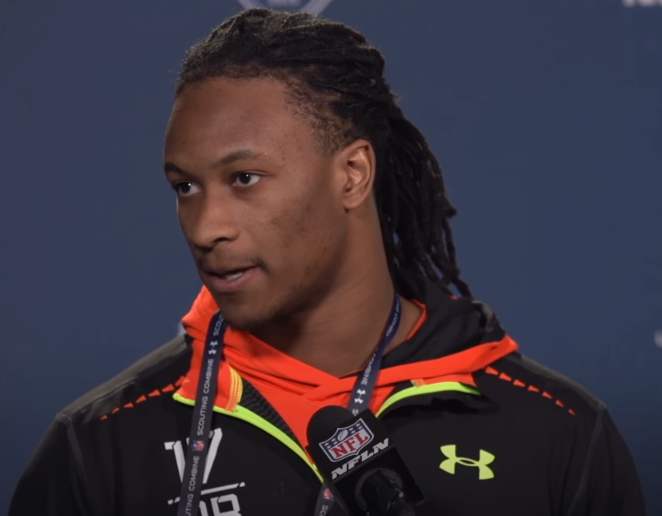
Gurley at the NFL Scouting Combine in 2015

==== 2015 season ====
Gurley was selected in the first round with the 10th overall pick by the St. Louis Rams in the 2015 NFL draft. He was the first running back to be selected in that year's draft. He was the highest drafted running back out of Georgia since Garrison Hearst went third overall in 1993. Gurley's rehabilitation went ahead of schedule and during the team's preseason, while he did not play, he practiced without wearing pads. Shortly after, Gurley was medically cleared for full contact by St. Louis team physicians.

On September 27, 2015, Gurley made his NFL debut against the Pittsburgh Steelers in Week 3. He was eased into action and finished the game with six rushes for nine yards in the 12–6 loss. The following week, the Rams visited the undefeated Arizona Cardinals for an NFC West divisional matchup. Gurley started slow with just two rushing yards at halftime, but rushed for 144 yards in the second half as the Rams edged the Cardinals by a score of 24–22. The next three games against the Green Bay Packers, Cleveland Browns, and the San Francisco 49ers would see Gurley rush for at least 128 rushing yards per game. He scored his first NFL touchdown on October 25, 2015, against the Browns the Week 7 matchup. With 566 yards in his first four NFL starts, Gurley became the most prolific rusher in his first four NFL games since the AFL–NFL merger. Following the 27–6 win over the 49ers in Week 8, Gurley's jersey and cleats were inducted into the Pro Football Hall of Fame.

In Week 9, Gurley was held to 89 yards on 24 carries in the Rams' 21–18 overtime loss to the Minnesota Vikings. In Week 10, he was contained to just 45 rushing yards on 12 carries in a 37–13 loss to the Chicago Bears. In Week 11, Gurley rushed for 66 yards on 25 carries against the Baltimore Ravens and scored a touchdown in a 16–13 loss. In Week 12, Gurley was limited to 19 yards on nine carries in a 31–7 loss to the Cincinnati Bengals. The following week, he was held to 41 rushing yards on nine carries in a 27–3 loss at home in the second divisional matchup against the Arizona Cardinals. In Week 14, Gurley rushed for 140 yards in the Rams' 24–14 win over the Detroit Lions. In Week 15, Gurley rushed for 48 yards, scored a touchdown, and became the third rookie in Rams history to rush for 1,000 yards in a season (Jerome Bettis and Eric Dickerson) in a 31–23 victory over the Tampa Bay Buccaneers. In Week 16, Gurley rushed for 85 yards on 19 carries in a 23–17 victory over the Seattle Seahawks, becoming the second Rams rookie, the first being Dickerson in 1983, to rush for 1,000 yards and 10 touchdowns.

Gurley finished his rookie year with 1,106 rushing yards and ten touchdowns on 229 attempts despite making only 12 starts (he sat out the Rams' season-ending loss at San Francisco). On December 22, 2015, Gurley was selected to be part of the 2016 Pro Bowl along with fellow Rams players defensive lineman Aaron Donald and punter Johnny Hekker. He was named to the 2015 NFL All-Rookie Team. Gurley was one of the five rookies to be selected to the Pro Bowl, along with Kansas City Chiefs cornerback Marcus Peters, Seattle Seahawks wide receiver/kick returner Tyler Lockett, Oakland Raiders wide receiver Amari Cooper, and Tampa Bay Buccaneers quarterback Jameis Winston. Gurley beat out Winston for NFL Offensive Rookie of the Year, earning a decisive 27 votes to 17 for Winston. He was ranked 22nd by his fellow players on the NFL Top 100 Players of 2016.

==== 2016 season ====
In the Rams' first season back in Los Angeles, Gurley struggled in his second professional season. In the first two weeks of the 2016 season against the 49ers and Seahawks, Gurley was held to a combined 98 rushing yards on 36 carries. However, in Week 3 against the Buccaneers, Gurley had 28 carries for 85 yards and two touchdowns in a 37–32 victory. His performance against the Buccaneers would be a season best. The Rams finished the season with a 4–12 record. Gurley finished with 278 carries for 885 rushing yards, which ranked 17th in the NFL, 55.3 rushing yards per game, a significant decline from the previous season, and six touchdowns.

==== 2017 season ====
Following the firing of Jeff Fisher and subsequent hiring of Sean McVay as new head coach, Gurley looked to rebound off of a down year which frustrated him with the Rams, prompting him to call the former playbook of the team similar to that of a "middle school offense". Gurley started the 2017 season with a solid performance against the Indianapolis Colts. He had 19 carries for 40 rushing yards and a rushing touchdown to go along with five receptions for 56 receiving yards in the 46–9 victory. In a Week 2 game against the Washington Redskins, he had 16 carries for 88 yards and a rushing touchdown to go along with three receptions for 48 yards and a receiving touchdown in the 27–20 loss. Gurley's breakout game of 2017 came in Week 3 against the 49ers on Thursday Night Football. He ran for 113 yards and two touchdowns and caught five passes for 36 yards and one touchdown. He earned the NFC Offensive Player of the Month for September after recording 241 rushing yards, 140 receiving yards and six total touchdowns. Gurley's streak would continue in Week 4 against the Dallas Cowboys where he recorded 215 scrimmage yards (121 rushing yards and 94 receiving yards) and a receiving touchdown in the Rams 35–30 victory. Having been held without a receiving touchdown in his first 30 games, he now had one in each of his last three, and led the NFL in total touchdowns and yards-from-scrimmage. Gurley was then named NFC Offensive Player of the Week after his 215-yard game against the Cowboys. After logging just 43 yards on 14 carries in Week 5 against the Seahawks, in Week 6 Gurley recorded his third 100-yard rushing game of the season with 121 yards on 23 carries against the Jacksonville Jaguars. In Week 7, Gurley had yet another 100-yard game as 106 yards for 22 rushing attempts and one rushing touchdown in the Rams 33–0 shutout victory over the Cardinals.

Following the Rams' Week 8 bye, Gurley's output became more balanced for the next five games: he averaged 62 rushing- and 54 receiving-yards per game, with 100+ yards from scrimmage in four of them, and recording three rushing touchdowns over that time period. In Week 14, he had 96 rushing yards and two rushing touchdowns on just 13 carries, along with three receptions for 39 receiving yards in an impressive-but-losing effort against the Philadelphia Eagles. In Week 15, Gurley had a career-best four touchdowns (three rushing, including a 57-yarder on 3rd and 20 with 30 seconds left in the first half) on 180 yards from scrimmage in a dominant 42–7 win over Seattle. He became the first Ram to score four touchdowns in a single game since Steven Jackson in 2006. He scored 24 total points in the game, which was the most for a single game by any player in the 2017 season. His performance in Week 15 earned him NFC Offensive Player of the Week. On December 19, Gurley was named to his second Pro Bowl as a starter. In Week 16, Gurley caught 10 passes for 158 yards and two receiving touchdowns to go along with 118 rushing yards, earning him NFC Offensive Player of the Week for the second straight week. Gurley was named the NFC Offensive Player of the Month for the second time that season. The playoff-bound Rams decided to have Gurley sit out the last game of the season against the San Francisco 49ers, allowing Kareem Hunt to win the title for rushing yards, but he still led the NFL with 13 rushing touchdowns, 19 total touchdowns, and 2,093 yards-from-scrimmage and all-purpose yards. He finished the season leading the league in scoring among non-kickers with 114 points. He was the 16th player in NFL history with a 750/750 rushing/receiving yard season and the eighth to record a 1,300/750 season.

Gurley played his first career post-season game in the Wild Card Round against the Atlanta Falcons on January 6, 2018. Playing from behind most of the game, he had 14 carries for 101 rushing yards in the 26–13 home loss.

After a stellar 2017 season, Gurley was named the NFL Offensive Player of the Year. He finished second in MVP voting to Tom Brady. He was ranked sixth by his fellow players on the NFL Top 100 Players of 2018.

==== 2018 season ====
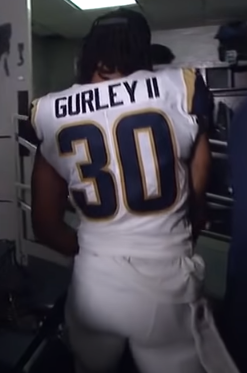
Gurley walking off the field after winning the NFC Championship Game

On April 24, 2018, the Rams exercised the fifth-year option on Gurley's contract. On July 24, 2018, Gurley signed a four-year, $60 million contract extension with the Rams with $45 million guaranteed, making him the highest-paid running back in the NFL.

Gurley scored the Rams' first touchdown of the season, taking a short pass from quarterback Jared Goff and going 19 yards to the end zone against the Raiders in Week 1. The touchdown was part of a 147-scrimmage yard performance for Gurley in the 33–13 victory. In Week 2, in the 34–0 victory over the Cardinals, Gurley recorded three rushing touchdowns for the second time in his professional career. In Week 3, Gurley had 23 carries for 105 rushing yards and a rushing touchdown to go along with five receptions for 51 receiving yards in the 35–23 victory over the Los Angeles Chargers.

In Week 5, Gurley had 77 rushing yards and three rushing touchdowns in the 33–31 victory over the Seahawks. In Week 6, Gurley ran 28 times for a career-high 208 yards and two touchdowns in a 23–20 win over the Denver Broncos, earning him NFC Offensive Player of the Week. In Week 7, against the 49ers, he recorded two rushing touchdowns and a receiving touchdown in the 39–10 victory. Gurley was named the NFC Offensive Player of the Month for the month of October after rushing for 462 yards and seven touchdowns and catching 16 passes for 157 yards and two touchdowns through four games.

With a 17-yard touchdown run during a Week 10 victory over the Seattle Seahawks, Todd Gurley set a new team record by scoring a touchdown in 13 straight games, breaking the mark set by Elroy "Crazy Legs" Hirsch. During a Week 12 matchup against the Lions, Gurley rushed for 132 yards and two touchdowns in the fourth quarter to help the Rams clinch their second straight NFC West title and was named NFC Offensive Player of the Week for the second time in 2018.

Gurley scored two rushing touchdowns in a 30–23 loss to the Eagles in Week 15. He was then held out of the final two regular season games due to knee inflammation and finished the 2018 season with 256 carries for 1,251 yards and 17 touchdowns rushing, along with 59 receptions for 580 yards and four touchdowns receiving. Gurley was named to his third Pro Bowl in his four professional seasons. He was named as a First-Team All-Pro.

In the NFC Divisional Playoff against Cowboys, Gurley ran 16 times for 115 yards and a touchdown in the Rams' 30–22 victory.

In the NFC Championship Game against the New Orleans Saints, Gurley struggled as he ran four times for 10 yards and a touchdown and had one catch for three yards in a 26–23 overtime victory to advance to the Super Bowl.

Leading up to Super Bowl LIII against the New England Patriots, Gurley's injury status was heavily discussed with reports claiming he was healthy while other reports claimed his knee was significantly more hurt than thought. In the Super Bowl, Gurley had ten carries for 35 rushing yards in the 13–3 loss to the Patriots. On March 2, 2019, it was reported that Gurley had arthritis in his left knee.

==== 2019 season ====
Coming off the 2018 campaign, Gurley's lingering knee issues contributed to him being utilized less in 2019 resulting in lesser production. He failed to record a 100-yard rushing game but was reliable in the redzone on scoring touchdowns. Overall, Gurley finished the 2019 season with 857 rushing yards and 12 rushing touchdowns to go along with 31 receptions for 207 receiving yards and two receiving touchdowns in the Rams 9–7 season. On March 19, 2020, Gurley was released. It was later revealed that the Rams were possibly going to trade him to the Pittsburgh Steelers, but Gurley refused. The move to cut Gurley cost the Rams $20 million in dead cap space to be spread out across the next two seasons, but the Rams avoided paying him over $10 million in roster bonuses that would have become guaranteed had they kept him on the roster, and freed up $5.5 million in cap space with the move.

=== Atlanta Falcons ===
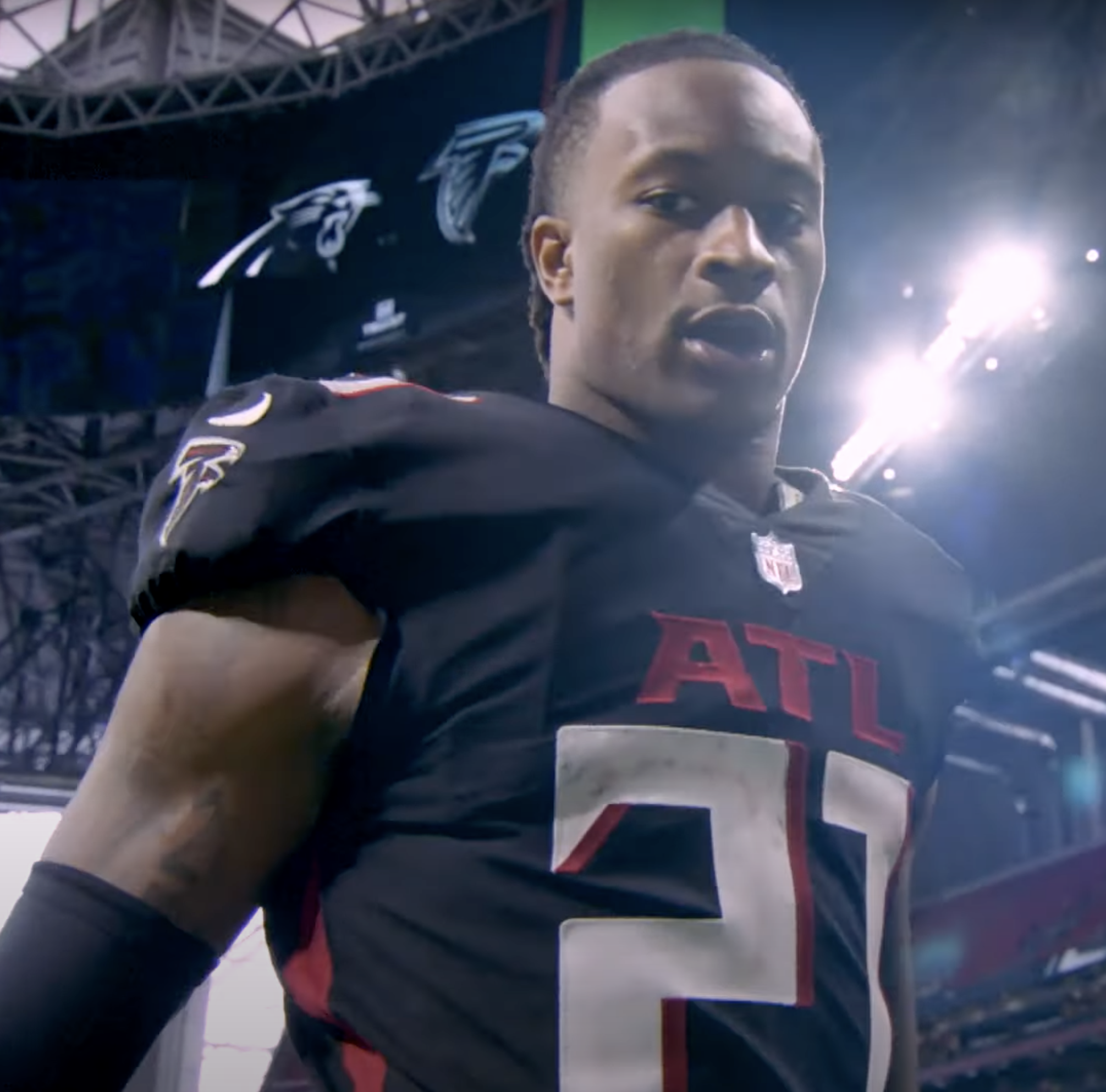
Gurley with the Falcons in 2020

On April 6, 2020, Gurley signed a one-year, $5.5 million contract with the Falcons. The deal included a $2 million signing bonus, as well as $500,000 in incentives if he has 13 touchdowns or 1,000 rushing yards.

Gurley made his Falcons debut in Week 1 against the Seahawks. During the game, Gurley rushed 14 times for 56 yards and his first rushing touchdown as a Falcon in the 38–25 loss. In Week 4 against the Packers, he had 16 carries for 57 rushing yards and two rushing touchdowns in the 30–16 loss. In Week 5 against the Panthers, Gurley recorded 150 yards from scrimmage and a rushing touchdown during the 23–16 loss. In Week 7 against the Lions, he had 23 carries for 63 rushing yards and two rushing touchdowns in the 23–22 loss. His second rushing touchdown was particularly notable. The Falcons were trailing 16–14 late in the fourth quarter while driving. The Falcons were able to get into a position to run out most of the clock and kick a potential game-winning field goal. However, Gurley was given the ball and tried to stop crossing the goal line. However, he scored a touchdown with 1:04 remaining to give the Lions a chance to get the football back and win the game, which they did. Overall, Gurley finished the 2020 season with 195 carries for 678 rushing yards and nine rushing touchdowns to go along with 25 receptions for 164 receiving yards. Throughout the season, Gurley shared backfield carries with Brian Hill and Ito Smith.

After not playing in 2021, Gurley confirmed in an October 2022 interview that he was finished playing professional football.

His 79 total touchdowns in 88 games is the most for all players who played less than 100 career games in NFL history.

== Career statistics ==
=== NFL ===
Legend
	AP NFL Offensive Player of the Year
	Led the league
**Bold**	Career high

==== Regular season ====
Year	Team	Games		Rushing					Receiving					Fumbles	
Year	Team	GP	GS	Att	Yds	Avg	Lng	TD	Rec	Yds	Avg	Lng	TD	Fum	Lost
2015	STL	13	12	229	1,106	4.8	**71T**	10	21	188	9.0	31	0	3	1
2016	LAR	**16**	**16**	278	885	3.2	24T	6	43	327	7.6	33	0	2	1
2017	LAR	15	15	**279**	**1,305**	4.7	57T	13	**64**	**788**	**12.3**	**80T**	**6**	**5**	**2**
2018	LAR	14	14	256	1,251	**4.9**	36	**17**	59	580	9.8	56	4	1	1
2019	LAR	15	15	223	857	3.8	25	12	31	207	6.7	23	2	3	2
2020	ATL	15	15	195	678	3.5	35	9	25	164	6.6	26	0	2	0
Career		88	87	1,460	6,082	4.2	71T	67	243	2,254	9.3	80T	12	16	7

==== Postseason ====
Year	Team	Games		Rushing					Receiving					Fumbles	
Year	Team	GP	GS	Att	Yds	Avg	Lng	TD	Rec	Yds	Avg	Lng	TD	Fum	Lost
2017	LAR	1	1	14	101	**7.2**	33	0	**4**	**10**	**2.5**	4	0	0	0
2018	LAR	**3**	**3**	**30**	**160**	5.3	**35T**	**2**	**4**	5	1.2	**7**	0	0	0
Career		4	4	44	261	5.9	35	2	8	15	1.9	7	0	0	0

=== College ===
Season	Team	Games		Rushing					Receiving					Fumbles	
Season	Team	GP	GS	Att	Yds	Avg	Lng	TD	Rec	Yds	Avg	Lng	TD	Fum	Lost
2012	Georgia	**14**	**14**	**222**	**1,385**	6.2	55	**17**	16	117	7.3	23	0	**2**	**1**
2013	Georgia	10	10	165	989	6.0	**75T**	10	**37**	**441**	**11.9**	**73T**	**6**	1	**1**
2014	Georgia	6	6	123	911	**7.4**	51T	9	12	57	4.8	23	0	0	0
Career		30	30	510	3,285	6.4	75	36	65	615	9.5	73	6	3	2

== Awards and honors ==
NFL

- 3× Pro Bowl selection (2015, 2017, 2018)
- NFL Offensive Player of the Year (2017)
- 2× First-team All-Pro selection (2017, 2018)
- 3x NFC Offensive Player of the Month (2017 – September, December; 2018 – October)
- 5x NFC Offensive Player of the Week (2017 – Week 4, Week 15, Week 16; 2018 – Week 6, Week 13)
- FedEx Ground Player of the Year (2017)
- FedEx Ground Player of the Week (2017 – Week 15, Week 16; 2018 – Week 6)
- Ranked No. 22 in the Top 100 Players of 2016
- Ranked No. 6 in the Top 100 Players of 2018
- Ranked No. 5 in the Top 100 Players of 2019
- Ranked No. 51 in the Top 100 Players of 2020
- NFL Offensive Rookie of the Year (2015)
- PFWA All-Rookie Team (2015)

College

- First-team All-SEC (2012)
- Second-team All-SEC (2013)

== Indoor football teams ==
On May 23, 2022, Gurley joined the ownership group for the FCF Beasts of the Fan Controlled Football League.

== Personal life ==
Gurley acquired numerous sponsorships in his professional career, including Hulu, Gatorade, and Carl's Jr.

Gurley was a co-founder of the M.A.D.E. Sports Foundation, which is designed to work in communities and use sports to help build character among members.

As a result of his successful 2017 season, a movement started among some fantasy football owners who owned Gurley in their leagues to donate some of their winnings to Shriners Hospitals for Children, which was Gurley's charity of choice. The initiative ended up netting over $10,000 for the hospital.

In 2018, Gurley hosted a childhood literacy initiative in partnership with Pizza Hut. The initiative was collaborating with nonprofit organization First Book to fulfill the company's goal of providing access to a quality education for needy children.
