= Alexis Panisse =

Dominican middle-distance runner (born 1993)

Personal information
- Nationality: American
- Born: 21 June 1993 (age 33)

Sport
- Sport: Track and Field
- Event(s): 800 meters, 1500 meters, 3000 meters, 5000 meters

Achievements and titles
- Personal best: 800 m: 2:03.61 (University of North Florida 2014)
Medal record
Women's athletics
Representing the Dominican Republic
CAC Junior Championships (Junior)
Gold medal – first place	2012 San Salvador	1500 m
Gold medal – first place	2012 San Salvador	5000 m
Bronze medal – third place	2012 San Salvador	4×400 m relay

Alexis Panisse (born 21 June 1993) is a middle-distance runner representing the Dominican Republic.

== Biography ==
She was born in America. She attended Benjamin N. Cardozo High School in Bayside, New York City, and competed for the Tennessee Volunteers women's track and field team.

== Accomplishments ==
She won gold medals over 1500 and 5000 metres at the 2012 Central American and Caribbean Junior Championships in Athletics in San Salvador.
