= Michelle Jenneke =

Australian athlete and model

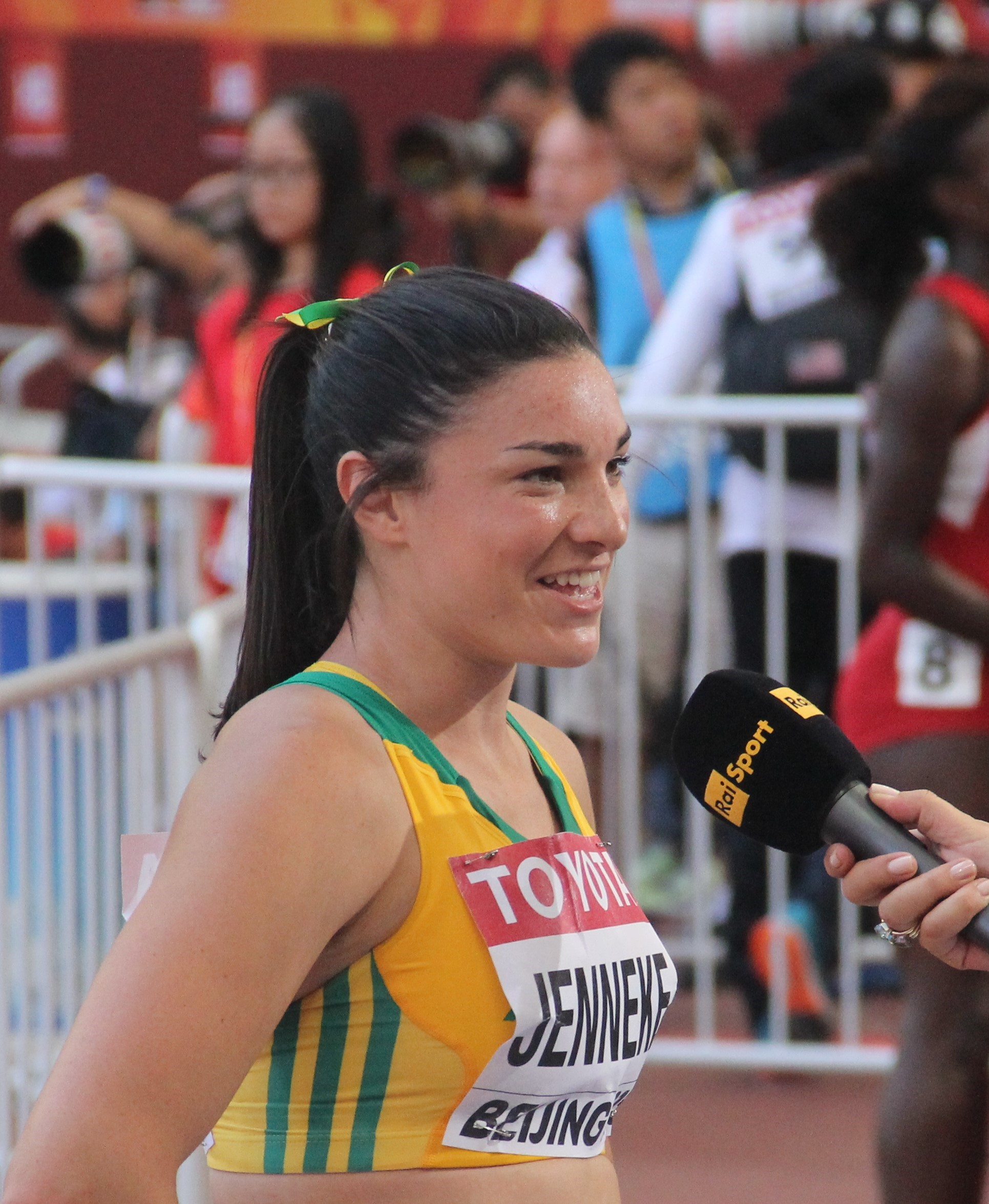
- Jenneke at the 2015 IAAF World Championships

Personal information
- Nickname: Shelly
- Born: 23 June 1993 (age 33) Kenthurst, New South Wales, Australia
- Height: 172 cm (5 ft 8 in)

Sport
- Country: Australia
- Sport: Athletics
- Events: 100 metres hurdles Sprint medley relay
- Club: Sydney University Athletics Club
- Team: Athletics Australia

Achievements and titles
- Olympic finals: 2010 Summer Youth Olympics: 100 m hurdles – Silver Medley relay – 4th place
- World finals: 2012 World Junior Championships: 100 m hurdles – 5th place
- National finals: 2016, 2023, 2024 Australian Championships: 100 m hurdles – 1st place
- Personal best: 100 m hurdles 12.65 (Hengelo, Netherlands 2024)
Medal record
Representing Australia
Summer Universiade
Bronze medal – third place	2015 Gwangju	100 m hurdles
Youth Olympic Games
Silver medal – second place	2010 Singapore	100 m hurdles
Oceania Youth Championships
Gold medal – first place	2010 Sydney	100 m hurdles
Gold medal – first place	2010 Sydney	4×100 m relay
Bronze medal – third place	2010 Sydney	100 m

Michelle "Shelly" Jenneke (/ˈdʒɛnəˌkʌ/ JEN-ə-kuh; born 23 June 1993) is an Australian hurdler and model. She is a three-time Australian national champion in the 100 m hurdles (2016, 2023, 2024) and in 2023 became the second-fastest hurdler in the 100 m hurdles in Australia's history after Sally Pearson. Jenneke won a silver medal for the 100 m hurdles at the 2010 Summer Youth Olympics and the 100 m hurdles at the 2016 Australian Athletics Championships to qualify for the 2016 Rio Olympic Games. In 2012, she received worldwide media attention after her pre-race warm-up dance went viral on the internet, and she was featured in the 2013 Sports Illustrated Swimsuit Issue.

== Early life and education ==
Born in Kenthurst, New South Wales, regional Australia, Jenneke attended The Hills Grammar School. In 2012, she was part of a short-term volunteer missionary trip to Tanzania, East Africa, where she worked for several months in an orphanage school. She has noted that over the years she has been involved in a range of charities.

She studied mechatronics at Sydney University, a combination of mechanical and electric engineering. In an interview, she described her hobbies as Australian rules football, soccer, quad biking, climbing trees, and handball.

== Career ==
Jenneke has trained with coach Mick Zisti as a hurdler from the age of 10 at the Cherrybrook Athletics Club. She competed at the Canberra-hosted 2008 Pacific School Games in the 90 and 200 metres hurdles.

In March 2010, Jenneke finished first in the 100 m hurdles, breaking the national record in the women's sprint medley relay at the 2010 Australian Junior Championships. She competed in the 2011 Pirtek Athletic Allstars event. In July of that year, she was on Australia's team at the 2010 Singapore Youth Olympic Games, running the 100 m hurdles and the women's medley relay. In the hurdles, she came second with a time of 13.46 and set a personal best after winning her heat, and the medley relay team came fourth. Her medal was the first Australia won at the Games in athletics.

In 2011, Jenneke competed at the New Zealand hosted Cooks Classic. At the 2011 Australian Junior Championships, she had a first-place hurdles finish in the under-20 group. In April 2011 she competed at the 89th Australian Athletics Championships and finished third in the 100 m hurdles behind world champion Sally Pearson.

On 15 July 2012, Jenneke finished fifth in the 2012 IAAF World Junior Championships 100 m hurdles. After the competition, a video of her 100 m hurdles taken during the heats race, was subsequently posted on a video-sharing site, raising her profile around the world. The video was published on Wednesday and by Saturday, the religious newspaper The Christian Post reported it had received seven million views on video-sharing platform YouTube.

She was selected as a member of Australia's 2014 Commonwealth Games team. There Jenneke came fifth in the final with a time of 13.36 and was the youngest competitor. She is the second-fastest 100 metre hurdle woman in Australian history.

Jenneke's personal best is 12.65 set at the 2022 World Athletics Championships in Oregon, in the same heat that saw the world record fall to Tobi Amusan. She finished second at nationals to qualify for the 2015 World Championships in Beijing. Jenneke got through the heats to make the semi-finals. She finished sixth in her semi and in 18th place overall.

In March 2016, Jenneke represented Australia at the World Indoor Championships in Portland, Oregon and finished 10th. The next month she won the Australian National Championship 100 m hurdles final with a time of 12.93, qualifying her for the 2016 Summer Olympics in Rio de Janeiro. In August, Jenneke competed in the Olympics but was unable to get out of the heats, finishing in sixth with a time of 13.26. She would have needed a near personal best to qualify as the third qualifying time in her heat was 12.85. Australian head coach Craig Hilliard was critical of her performance.

In the Australian University Games at Perth, Jenneke tried her hand at the 100 metres sprint, getting through to the final, and the long jump where she finished second with a distance of 5.61 metres and her own event the 110 metres hurdles, which she won with a time of 14.19 seconds.

In August 2017, Jenneke competed in her second World Championships and got through the heats to the semi-finals, finishing in 7th with a time of 13.250. She would have needed a near personal best to reach the final as the second qualifying time in her semi was 12.85. In the BBC's montage of events (the moments of the games as BBC presenter Gabby Logan called it) on the games' final evening Jenneke and her warm up jig was featured.

In April 2018, she represented Australia at the Commonwealth Games, finishing fourth at 13.07, after running a qualifying time of 12.99.

At the 2024 Summer Olympics in Paris, Jenneke fell over a hurdle during her 100m heat.

== Media coverage ==
In July 2012, videos of Jenneke's pre-game warmup dance before the 100 m hurdles race at the 2012 World Junior Championships in Athletics in Barcelona went viral on YouTube. One clip received 19 million views by the following week and was featured on the American late-night talk show The Tonight Show.

Jenneke acted in a short comedic video produced by the website The Chive titled Forever Alone Meets Michelle Jenneke, playing herself in a piece referencing her viral video. The video had received over 10 million views on YouTube by 2014.

In January 2013, Jenneke was ranked tenth on AskMen.com's 99 Most Desirable Women 2013. She was featured in the 2013 Sports Illustrated Swimsuit Issue.

In 2014, Jenneke was featured in a video-heavy mobile computing app on stretching techniques called Stretch with Michelle Jenneke. Early the same year, she was a star in the Top Gear Sydney Festival, racing a Nissan GT-R.

In 2016, Jenneke's mother Nicky reflected on Michelle's personal spiritual values and convictions, noting in an interview with The Courier-Mail that Michelle's experience serving as a short-term Christian missionary in Tanzania was a "great learning experience", which helped her to appreciate the joy people who "live with absolutely nothing" can have. "It consolidated that idea in her head that you can’t control everything," she explained, "If she makes someone smile by doing her dance that’s great. If she makes someone cringe she’s a great believer in turn your computer off, don’t look."

Due to the large number of "very graphic messages from men" received on Michelle's social media accounts, her mother filters them for her. Nicky Jenneke explained the arrangement: "I do the censorship, she doesn't need to be looking at that."

== Athletic achievements ==
=== International competitions ===
Year	Competition	Venue	Position	Event	Notes
Representing Australia
2010	Oceania Youth Championships	Sydney, Australia	3rd	100 m	12.15 (+0.5 m/s)
2010	Oceania Youth Championships	Sydney, Australia	1st	100 m hurdles	14.12 (−1.4 m/s)
2010	Oceania Youth Championships	Sydney, Australia	1st	4 × 100 m relay	45.75
2010	Youth Olympic Games	Singapore	2nd	100 m hurdles	13.46
2010	Youth Olympic Games	Singapore	4th	"Swedish medley" relay	2:13.96
2012	World Junior Championships	Barcelona, Spain	5th	100 m hurdles	13.54
2014	Commonwealth Games	Glasgow, United Kingdom	5th	100 m hurdles	13.36
2015	Universiade	Gwangju, South Korea	3rd	100 m hurdles	12.94
2015	World Championships	Beijing, China	18th (sf)	100 m hurdles	13.01
2016	World Indoor Championships	Portland, United States	10th (h)	60 m hurdles	8.10
2016	Olympic Games	Rio de Janeiro, Brazil	37th (h)	100 m hurdles	13.26
2017	World Championships	London, United Kingdom	21st (sf)	100 m hurdles	13.25
2017	Universiade	Taipei, Taiwan	8th	100 m hurdles	14.82
2018	World Indoor Championships	Birmingham, United Kingdom	22nd (sf)	60 m hurdles	8.22
2018	Commonwealth Games	Gold Coast, Australia	4th	100 m hurdles	13.07
2022	World Championships	Eugene, United States	11th (sf)	100 m hurdles	12.65
2023	World Championships	Budapest, Hungary	14th (sf)	100 m hurdles	12.80
2024	World Indoor Championships	Glasgow, United Kingdom	16th (sf)	60 m hurdles	8.05
2024	Olympic Games	Paris, France	21st (rep)	100 m hurdles	13.86
2026	World Indoor Championships	Toruń, Poland	19th (sf)	60 m hurdles	8.02
2026	Commonwealth Games	Glasgow, United Kingdom	5th	100 m hurdles	12.84 (w)

=== National championships ===
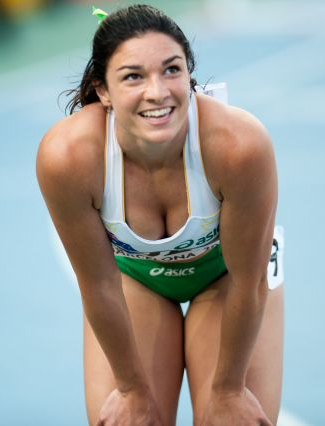
Michelle Jenneke at the 2012 World Junior Championships

- 1st place (100 m hurdles) – 2010 Australian Junior Championships
- 1st place (4 × 100 m relay) – 2010 Australian Junior Championships (national record)
- Australian Championships - 100 m hurdles
  - 1st place – 2016 (Olympic qualifying time, 12.93), 2023, 2024 (Olympic qualifying time, 12.88)
  - 2nd place – 2015, 2018, 2020
  - 3rd place – 2011, 2014, 2017, 2019, 2021, 2022
