= Athletics at the 2010 Summer Youth Olympics – Boys' 110 metre hurdles =

Athletics – Boys' 110 metres hurdles at the I Summer Youth Olympic Games
- Venue: Bishan Stadium
- Date: August 17–21
- Competitors: 17 from 17 nations

Medalists
1st place, gold medalist(s)		Nicholas Hough	Australia
2nd place, silver medalist(s)		Dongqiang Wang	China
3rd place, bronze medalist(s)		Jussi Kanervo	Finland

The boys' 110 metres hurdles competition at the 2010 Youth Olympic Games was held on 17–21 August 2010 in Bishan Stadium.

== Schedule ==
Date	Time	Round
17 August 2010	10:40	Heats
21 August 2010	19:40	Final

== Results ==
=== Heats ===
Rank	Heat	Lane	Athlete	Time	Notes	Q
1	2	3	Nicholas Hough (AUS)	13.50		FA
2	2	5	Jussi Kanervo (FIN)	13.63	PB	FA
3	2	4	Nicolas Borome (FRA)	13.65		FA
4	3	6	Yordan O'Farrill (CUB)	13.80		FA
5	2	6	Filip Drozdowski (POL)	13.82		FA
6	1	3	Dongqiang Wang (CHN)	13.87		FA
7	3	5	Stefan Fennell (JAM)	13.89		FA
8	3	3	Vaclav Sedlak (CZE)	13.92		FA
9	3	4	Themba Luhana (GBR)	14.02		FB
10	1	6	Jean Da Silva (BRA)	14.13		FB
11	3	7	Vjacheslav Shvydkyy (UKR)	14.36		FB
12	2	7	Joshua Hawkins (NZL)	14.46		FB
13	1	4	Muhd Ajmal Aiman Mat Hasan (MAS)	14.54		FB
14	1	2	Louis Fabrice Rajah (MRI)	14.66		FC
15	2	2	Rami Gharsali (TUN)	14.68		FC
16	1	7	Renjie Sean Toh (SIN)	15.09		FC
	1	5	Cesar Ramirez (MEX)	DSQ	F^{1}	FC

=== Finals ===
==== Final C ====
Wind: +0.2 m/s

Rank	Lane	Athlete	Time	Notes
1	2	Cesar Ramirez (MEX)	14.03	
2	3	Renjie Sean Toh (SIN)	14.24	PB
3	5	Louis Fabrice Rajah (MRI)	14.40	PB
	4	Rami Gharsali (TUN)	DSQ	F^{1}

==== Final B ====
Wind: 0.0m/s

Rank	Lane	Athlete	Time	Notes
1	3	Jean Da Silva (BRA)	13.76	
2	4	Themba Luhana (GBR)	13.78	
3	5	Vjacheslav Shvydkyy (UKR)	13.93	
4	2	Muhd Ajman Aimal Mat Hasan (MAS)	14.48	
5	6	Joshua Hawkins (NZL)	14.59	

==== Final A ====
Wind: +0.1 m/s

Rank	Lane	Athlete	Time	Notes
1st place, gold medalist(s)	6	Nicholas Hough (AUS)	13.37	PB
2nd place, silver medalist(s)	7	Dongqiang Wang (CHN)	13.41	PB
3rd place, bronze medalist(s)	3	Jussi Kanervo (FIN)	13.53	PB
4	2	Stefan Fennell (JAM)	13.54	PB
5	4	Yordan O'Farrill (CUB)	13.69	
6	8	Filip Drozdowski (POL)	13.75	PB
7	1	Vaclav Sedlak (CZE)	13.87	
	5	Nicolas Borome (FRA)	DNF	
