= Nicholas Hough =

Australian sprinter and hurdler

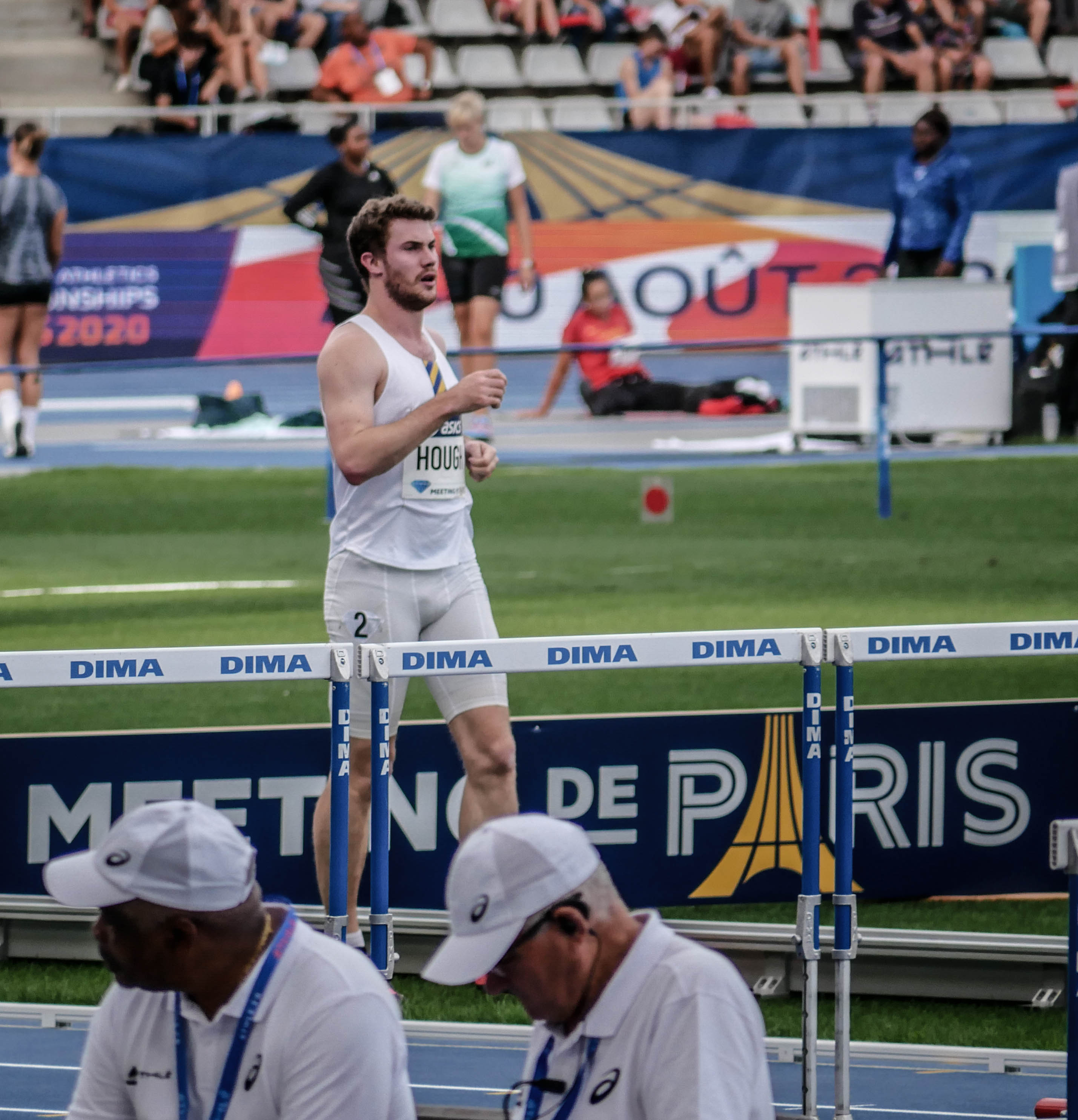
- Hough in 2019

Personal information
- Nationality: (Australia) Australian
- Born: 20 October 1993 (age 32) Sydney
- Height: 1.91 m (6 ft 3 in)
- Weight: 86 kg (190 lb)

Sport
- Sport: Athletics
- Events: Sprints & 110 metres hurdles

Achievements and titles
- Personal bests: 100 m: 10.39 s (Melbourne 2013) 200 m: 20.66 s (Sydney 2013) 110 m Hurdles - 91 cm: 13.37 s (Singapore 2010) 110 m Hurdles - 99 cm: 13.27 s (Barcelona 2012) 110 m Hurdles - 107 cm: 13.38 s (Gold Coast 2018)
Medal record
Men's athletics
Representing Australia
Commonwealth Games
Bronze medal – third place	2018 Gold Coast	Men's 110 m hurdles
Summer Youth Olympics
Gold medal – first place	2010 Singapore	110 m hurdles
Bronze medal – third place	2010 Singapore	Boys' medley relay
World Junior Championships in Athletics
Silver medal – second place	2012 Barcelona	110 m hurdles
Oceania Youth Championships
Gold medal – first place	2010 Sydney	100 m
Gold medal – first place	2010 Sydney	200 m
Gold medal – first place	2010 Sydney	110 m hurdles
Gold medal – first place	2010 Sydney	4x100 m relay
- Updated on 18 April 2013

Nicholas Hough (born 20 October 1993) is an Australian sprinter and hurdler.

== Early years ==
In 2011, Hough graduated from The King's School, Parramatta where he was the School Captain. In his HSC, he came equal fifth in the state in Software Development. Hough was an all-rounder, competing in sprints, hurdles, jumps and the shot put.

Hough made his international debut aged 16 at the inaugural 2010 Youth Olympic Games. Two years later he competed at the IAAF World Junior Championships winning silver in the 110m hurdles.

In 2013 Hough ran his lifetime bests in the sprints (10.39/20.66), securing semi-final places at the World University Games. He was then invited to run in the team for the national 4x100m relay at the World Championships.

== Achievements ==
At the inaugural 2010 Summer Youth Olympics in Singapore, Hough won the 110 metres hurdles in a new personal best of 13.37 seconds. He narrowly edged ahead of Dongqiang Wang of China and Jussi Kanervo of Finland to take the gold medal and become the first ever Youth Olympic Games hurdles champion.

Hough also competed in the Pirtek All-Stars Gatorade Bolt meet at the Sydney Olympic Park Athletic Centre on 15 September 2010. The event was a promotional visit for the Jamaican Sprint King Usain Bolt, and took place on the 10th anniversary of the Sydney Olympics. Nick won the David Baxter memorial 100m in a time of 10.62s, half a second quicker than the fastest men in football, Lachie Turner, John Grant and Jarryd Hayne, the fastest of whom clocked 11.10s on the night.

In 2014 he was a member of the Australian Commonwealth Games team, to represent Australia at Glasgow, Scotland. Hough placed 4th in the final of the 110m hurdles, and achieved a personal best. In the 2018 Commonwealth Games, Hough placed 3rd taking the bronze medal and achieved personal best for the Men's 110m hurdles.

Hough qualified for the Tokyo 2020 Olympics. He came third in his Men's 110m hurdles heat with a time of 13:57 and therefore qualified for the semi-final. In the semi-final Hough ran seventh with a time of 13:88, half a second behind the semi-final winner and eventual bronze medallist Ronald Levy from Jamaica.

Hough is currently studying a combined degree of Bachelor of Information Technology and Bachelor of Laws at Sydney University.

== Achievements ==
Year	Competition	Venue	Position	Event	Notes
Representing Australia
2010	Oceania Youth Championships	Sydney, Australia	1st	100 m	10.83 (0.0 m/s)
2010	Oceania Youth Championships	Sydney, Australia	1st	200 m	21.79 (-2.9 m/s)
2010	Oceania Youth Championships	Sydney, Australia	1st	110 m hurdles	13.87 (-1.8 m/s)
2010	Oceania Youth Championships	Sydney, Australia	1st	4 × 100 m relay	41.36
2017	World Championships	London, United Kingdom	27th (h)	110 m hurdles	13.61
2017	Universiade	Taipei, Taiwan	6th	110 m hurdles	13.73
2018	World Indoor Championships	Birmingham, United Kingdom	22nd (sf)	60 m hurdles	7.79
2018	Commonwealth Games	Gold coast, Australia	3rd	110 m hurdles	13.38 PB
2019	World Championships	Doha, Qatar	21st (sf)	110 m hurdles	13.61
2021	Olympic Games	Tokyo, Japan	21st (sf)	110 m hurdles	13.88
2022	World Championships	Eugene, United States	15th (sf)	110 m hurdles	13.42
