= Ruebin Walters =

Trinidad and Tobago hurdler

Personal information
- Born: 2 April 1995 (age 31) Diego Martin, Trinidad and Tobago
- Education: Central Arizona College; University of Alabama
- Height: 6 ft 1 in (185 cm)
- Weight: 178 lb (81 kg)

Sport
- Sport: Athletics
- Event: 110 metres hurdles
- College team: Alabama Crimson Tide
- Club: Memphis Pioneers

Ruebin Natardy Walters (born 2 April 1995 in Diego Martin) is an athlete from Trinidad and Tobago specialising in the high hurdles. He represented his country at the 2017 World Championships without reaching the semifinals.

Walters was an All-American hurdler for the Alabama Crimson Tide track and field team, finishing runner-up in the 110 meters hurdles at the 2017 NCAA Division I Outdoor Track and Field Championships.

== International competitions ==
Year	Competition	Venue	Position	Event	Notes
Representing Trinidad and Tobago
2011	CARIFTA Games (U17)	Montego Bay, Jamaica	4th	110 m hurdles (91.4 cm)	14.26
2011	CARIFTA Games (U17)	Montego Bay, Jamaica	4th	400 m hurdles (84 cm)	55.47
2011	World Youth Championships	Lille, France	11th (sf)	110 m hurdles (91.4 cm)	14.01
2011	World Youth Championships	Lille, France	6th	Medley relay	1:52.77
2012	CARIFTA Games (U20)	Hamilton, Bermuda	4th	110 m hurdles (99 cm)	14.02
2012	Central American and Caribbean; Junior Championships (U18)	San Salvador, El Salvador	1st	110 m hurdles (91.4 cm)	13.49
2012	Central American and Caribbean; Junior Championships (U18)	San Salvador, El Salvador	1st	4 × 400 m relay	3:11.66
2012	World Junior Championships	Barcelona, Spain	10th (sf)	110 m hurdles (99 cm)	13.73
2013	CARIFTA Games (U20)	Nassau, Bahamas	3rd	110 m hurdles (99 cm)	13.66
2013	CARIFTA Games (U20)	Nassau, Bahamas	3rd	400 m hurdles	52.31
2014	CARIFTA Games (U20)	Fort-de-France, Martinique	3rd	110 m hurdles (99 cm)	13.57
2014	CARIFTA Games (U20)	Fort-de-France, Martinique	3rd	400 m hurdles	51.68
2014	Central American and Caribbean; Junior Championships (U20)	Morelia, Mexico	2nd	110 m hurdles (99 cm)	13.59
2014	World Junior Championships	Eugene, United States	6th	110 m hurdles (99 cm)	13.52
2015	NACAC Championships	San José, Costa Rica	12th (h)	110 m hurdles	13.90
2016	NACAC U23 Championships	San Salvador, El Salvador	5th	110 m hurdles	13.71
2017	World Championships	London, United Kingdom	30th (h)	110 m hurdles	13.63
2018	Central American and Caribbean Games	Barranquilla, Colombia	2nd	110 m hurdles	13.57
2018	NACAC Championships	Toronto, Canada	5th	110 m hurdles	13.72
2019	Pan American Games	Lima, Peru	10th (h)	110 m hurdles	13.88
2022	World Indoor Championships	Belgrade, Serbia	20th (sf)	60 m hurdles	7.68

== Personal bests ==
Outdoor

- 200 metres – 22.06 (+0.7 m/s, Mesa 2015)
- 400 metres – 49.27 (Port-of-Spain 2012)
- 110 metres hurdles – 13.30 (+1.8 m/s, Port-of-Spain 2017)
- 400 metres hurdles – 50.68 (Levelland 2016)

Indoor

- 200 metres – 21.76 (Tucson 2016)
- 400 metres – 49.59 (Albuquerque 2015)
- 60 metres hurdles – 7.72 (Nashville 2017)
