= Theo Viltz =

American football player (born 1943)

No. 34, 31
- Position: Cornerback

Personal information
- Born: April 20, 1943 (age 83); Lafayette, Louisiana, U.S.
- Listed height: 6 ft 2 in (1.88 m)
- Listed weight: 190 lb (86 kg)

Career information
- High school: Junipero Serra (CA)
- College: USC (1962-1965)
- NFL draft: 1964: 18th round, 241st overall pick

Career history
- Houston Oilers (1966–1967); Denver Broncos (1968)*; Las Vegas Cowboys (1968)
- * Offseason or practice squad member only

Career AFL statistics
- Games played: 14
- Stats at Pro Football Reference

Theophile Anthony Viltz Jr. (born April 20, 1943) is an American former professional football player who was a cornerback for the Houston Oilers of the American Football League (AFL). He played college football for the USC Trojans.

== Early life ==
Viltz attended Junípero Serra High School, where he practiced football, track and basketball. In football, he was the team's starting halfback.

He accepted a football scholarship from the University of Southern California. As a sophomore in 1963, he was a backup wide receiver, compiling one reception for 9 yards in 10 games.

As a junior in 1964, he was converted into a defensive back and became a starter. He suffered a broken nose in the seventh game against the University of Washington that caused him to miss time.

He also competed in track, becoming an All-American in the high hurdles in 1964 and 1965. As a senior in 1965, he was elected co-captain of the USC's track team.

== Professional career ==
=== Houston Oilers ===
Viltz was selected by the Dallas Cowboys in the 18th round (241st overall) of the 1964 NFL draft with a future draft pick, which allowed the team to draft him before his college eligibility was over.

In 1966, after graduating from college, he opted to sign with the Houston Oilers of the American Football League. As a rookie, he was a backup at left cornerback and appeared in 14 games. He was waived on September 5, 1967. He was later signed to the taxi squad, where he spent the rest of the season. He was released on August 7, 1968.

=== Denver Broncos ===
In August 1968, he signed as a free agent with the Denver Broncos in the American Football League. He was activated on August 23. He was released on August 26.

== Personal life ==
After football, he was named the defensive backs coach at Long Beach Polytechnic High School. He also competed in the category of masters athletics. His son Misana, was a record-breaking hurdler in high school.
