= Jussi Kanervo =

Finnish hurdler (born 1993)

Personal information
- Born: 1 February 1993 (age 33) Tornio, Finland

Sport
- Country: Finland
- Sport: Athletics
- Event(s): 110 m hurdles 400 m hurdles
- College team: South Carolina Gamecocks
- Club: Alatornion Pirkat; HIFK (2010–)
- Coached by: Curtis Frye

Achievements and titles
- Personal best(s): 110 m hurdles: 13.88 (2013); 400 m hurdles: 49.66 (2015)
Medal record
European U23 Championships
| Silver medal – second place | 2015 Tallinn | 400 m hurdles |
Youth Olympic Games
| Bronze medal – third place | 2010 Singapore | 110 m hurdles |
- Updated on 16 July 2015

Jussi Aleksi Samuli Kanervo (born 1 February 1993) is a Finnish hurdler. He won silver in the 400 m hurdles at the 2015 European U23 Championships and bronze in the 110 m hurdles at the 2010 Youth Olympic Games.

== Biography ==
Kanervo was born in Tornio in northern Finland and set national age group records from an early age, breaking the national under-11 record for boys' 150 metres in 2003 and the national indoor under-12 record for 60 metres the following year. He competed in both the 110 m hurdles and the 400 m hurdles at the 2009 World Youth Championships in Brixen, Italy, but was eliminated in the early rounds in both events. In 2010 Kanervo's family relocated to Helsinki, and he joined the training group of national hurdles coach Anatoly Mikhailov. Kanervo represented Finland at the inaugural Youth Olympic Games in Singapore in August 2010, winning bronze in boys' 110 m hurdles (91.4 cm) in 13.53 and breaking his own national youth record; he was the first Finn to win a Youth Olympic medal.

Kanervo placed fifth in the 110 m hurdles at the 2011 European Junior Championships. He won his first senior-level medals at the Finnish championships in 2012, winning bronze indoors in the 60 m hurdles and gold outdoors in the 110 m hurdles. At the 2012 World Junior Championships in Barcelona he again competed in the 110 m hurdles, setting a national junior record (13.61/99 cm) in the semi-finals; in the final he ran 13.62 and placed fifth.

Kanervo repeated as Finnish champion in the 110 m hurdles in 2013; he represented Finland in that event at the European U23 Championships in Tampere, but was eliminated in the heats. After the 2013 season Kanervo became a student at South Carolina University, coached by Curtis Frye. He took up the 400 m hurdles again in 2014, running 51.52 in his first race over the senior (91.4 cm) hurdles; the time broke Ossi Mildh's HIFK club record from 1954 and was the fastest ever debut by a Finn. He won his third consecutive Finnish championship title in the 110 m hurdles that year, but his times in that event had stagnated and the 400 m hurdles became his main event; at the 2014 European Athletics Championships in Zürich he competed only in the 400 m hurdles, setting a personal best 50.35 in the heats but withdrawing from the semi-finals due to an injury.

Kanervo broke 50 seconds in the 400 m hurdles for the first time on 11 April 2015 in Greenville, North Carolina, running 49.78. He suffered from a persistent groin injury through the 2015 collegiate season, but stayed in good form; he qualified for his first NCAA championship final, placing sixth in 50.20. At the 2015 European U23 Championships in Tallinn Kanervo improved his personal best to 49.66, winning silver behind Patryk Dobek of Poland; he was Finland's only medalist.
