= Yordan O'Farrill =

Cuban hurdler (born 1993)

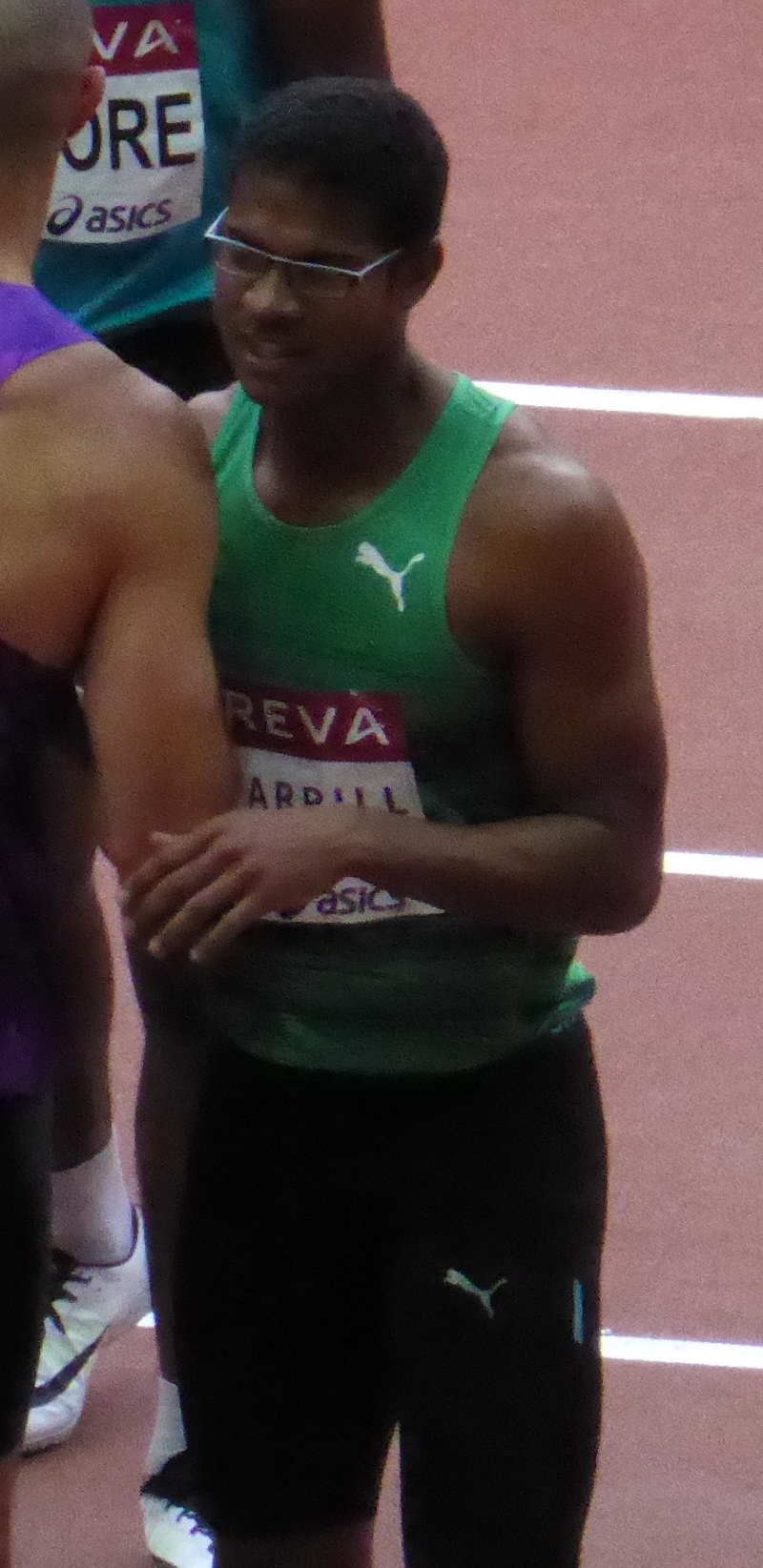
- Yordan O'Farrill in 2015

Personal information
- Full name: Yordan Luis O'Farrill Olivera
- Born: 9 February 1993 (age 33) Santa Cruz del Sur, Camagüey, Cuba
- Height: 1.83 m (6 ft 0 in)
- Weight: 72 kg (159 lb)

Sport
- Sport: Running
- Event: 110 metre hurdles

Achievements and titles
- Personal best: 110 m H (99cm): 13.18 (Barcelona 2012)
Medal record
Men's athletics
Representing Cuba
CAC Championships
Bronze medal – third place	2013 Morelia	110 m hurdles
World Junior Championships
Gold medal – first place	2012 Barcelona	110 m hurdles
CAC Junior Championships
Gold medal – first place	2012 San Salvador	110 m hurdles
- Updated on 19 December 2014

Yordan Luis O'Farrill Olivera (born 9 February 1993 in Santa Cruz del Sur, Camagüey) is a Cuban hurdler.

He won a gold medal in the 110 metres hurdles at the 2012 World Junior Championships in Athletics in Barcelona, while also beating Artur Noga's championship record.

O'Farrill is of Irish descent through his grandfather on his father's side.

== Personal bests ==
=== Outdoor ===
- 100 m: 10.44 s (wind: +1.8 m/s) – Bilbao, Spain, 21 June 2014
- 110 m hurdles: 13.19 s (wind: 0.0 m/s) – Prague, Czech Republic, 9 June 2014

=== Indoor ===
- 60 m hurdles: 7.65 s – Düsseldorf, Germany, 8 February 2013

== International competitions ==
Year	Competition	Venue	Position	Event	Notes
Representing Cuba
2010	Youth Olympic Games	Singapore	5th	110 m hurdles (91.4 cm)	13.69 (+0.1 m/s)
2012	Central American and Caribbean; Junior Championships (U20)	San Salvador, El Salvador	1st	110 m hurdles (99.0 cm)	13.27 (0.0 m/s)
2012	World Junior Championships	Barcelona, Spain	1st	110 m hurdles (99.0 cm)	13.18 (+1.0 m/s)
2013	Central American and Caribbean Championships	Morelia, Mexico	3rd	110m hurdles	13.82 A (-3.4 m/s)
2014	World Indoor Championships	Sopot, Poland	18th (h)	60m hurdles	7.75
2014	Pan American Sports Festival	Mexico City, Mexico	5th (h)^{1}	110m hurdles	13.72 A (-0.2 m/s)
2014	Continental Cup	Marrakesh, Morocco	7th	110m hurdles	13.67 (+0.1 m/s)
2014	Central American and Caribbean Games	Xalapa, Mexico	1st	110m hurdles	13.46 A (+0.7 m/s)
2015	World Championships	Beijing, China	26th (h)	110m hurdles	13.64
2016	World Indoor Championships	Portland, United States	8th (h)	60 m hurdles	7.67
2016	Olympic Games	Rio de Janeiro, Brazil	21st (sf)	110 m hurdles	13.70
2017	IAAF World Relays	Nassau, Bahamas	5th (B)	4 × 100 m relay	39.90
2017	World Championships	London, United Kingdom	22nd (h)	110 m hurdles	13.56^{2}

^{1}: Disqualified in the final.
^{2}: Did not finish in the semifinals
