= Rebecca Watts =

British poet (born 1983)

Rebecca Watts (born 1983) is a British poet. Her first collection of poetry, The Met Office Advises Caution, was published by Carcanet Press in 2016 and was shortlisted for the Seamus Heaney Centre for Poetry's First Collection Poetry Prize in 2017.

== Early life ==
Watts was born in Suffolk. She studied English at Trinity College, Cambridge, and received a Master's degree in English literature from Oxford University.

She works part-time in a library in Cambridge.

== Cult of the Noble Amateur ==
In 2018 Watts refused to review Hollie McNish's poetry collection Plum for P. N. Review, instead writing a polemical article titled "Cult of the Noble Amateur" in which she wrote: "Plum is the product not of a poet but of a personality. I was supposed to be reviewing it, but to do so for a poetry journal would imply that it deserves to be taken seriously as poetry. Besides, I was too distracted by the pathological attitude of its faux-naïve author, and too offended by its editor's exemplary bad faith, to ignore the broader questions it provokes." Although the article began from this point Watts also discussed the work of poets such as Rupi Kaur and Kae Tempest. This article subsequently received coverage in several national news outlets such as The Guardian, which described it as, variously "excoriating", "a stinging critique" and "Giving a fresh meaning to the notion of a poetry slam". Watts was also interviewed on Front Row as a result of this article. Responses to the article also appeared elsewhere – an article written for The Times Literary Supplement stated: "So: Hollie McNish is a terrible poet. Or: Hollie McNish is a wonderful poet. Leave her alone, OK? As ever, the people who care, or pretend to care, about poetry cannot make up their collective mind. This time round, it is an essay in the latest issue of the poetry magazine PN Review, 'The Cult of the Noble Amateur'". McNish commented on her blog: "I just feel like this is an extremely one-sided piece and if it's going to be used to prove how shite and attention-seeking I am, I'd like a space to stand up for myself", before going on to provide a line-by-line response to the essay.

== Publications ==
- The Met Office Advises Caution. Manchester: Carcanet, 2016. ISBN 978-1-784102-72-2.
- Red Gloves. Manchester: Carcanet, 2020. ISBN 978-1-784109-55-4
- The Face in the Well. Manchester: Carcanet, 2025. ISBN 978-1-800174-58-0

Contributions

- Trinity Poets: An Anthology of Poems by Members of Trinity College, Cambridge from the sixteenth to twenty-first century. Manchester: Carcanet, 2017. Edited by Adrian Poole and Angela Leighton. ISBN 978-1-784103-56-9.
- Jennings, Elizabeth. New Selected Poems. Manchester: Carcanet, 2019. Edited by Rebecca Watts. ISBN 978-1784108-65-6

== Awards ==
- 2017: Shortlisted, Seamus Heaney Centre for Poetry, First Collection Poetry Prize, for The Met Office Advises Caution
