= Andries van der Merwe =

South African sprinter

Personal information
- Nationality: South African
- Born: March 31, 1994 (age 32)
- Height: 1.85 m (6 ft 1 in)
- Weight: 84 kg (185 lb)

Sport
- Sport: Running
- Event: 110 metre hurdles

Achievements and titles
- Personal best: 110 m H: 13.39 s (Windhoek 2011)
Medal record
Men's athletics
Representing South Africa
World Youth Championships
Gold medal – first place	2011 Lille	110 m hurdles
Commonwealth Youth Games
Gold medal – first place	2011 Douglas	110 m hurdles
Gold medal – first place	2011 Douglas	4×100 m relay

Andries van der Merwe (born 31 March 1994) is a South African sprinter.

He won a gold medal in the 110 metre hurdles at the 2011 World Youth Championships in Athletics, in a winning time of 13.41 seconds.

He attended Afrikaanse Hoër Seunskool in Pretoria.
