= Tyler Mason =

Jamaican athlete (born 1995)

Personal information
- Nationality: Jamaican
- Born: 15 November 1995 (age 30)

Sport
- Sport: Athletics
- Event: Hurdles
- Club: Elite Performance
- Coached by: Reynaldo Walcott

Achievements and titles
- Personal bests: 60m hurdles: 7.65 (Fayetteville, 2024); 110m hurdles: 13.12 (Kingston, 2023); 100m: 10.15 (Kingston, 2026)
Medal record
Men's athletics
Representing Jamaica
World Championships
Bronze medal – third place	2025 Tokyo	110 m hurdles
World Junior Championships
Silver medal – second place	2014 Oregon	110 m hurdles
NACAC U23 Championships
Bronze medal – third place	2016 San Salvador	100 m hurdles

Tyler Mason (born 15 November 1995) is a Jamaican sprinter who specialises in the 110m and 60m hurdles. He was the bronze medalist over 110 metres hurdles at the 2025 World Athletics Championships.

== Biography ==
=== Junior career ===
At the 2014 ISSA Boys and Girls Championships, he finished second behind Jaheel Hyde in the Class one 110 metres hurdles.

Mason was a silver medalist at the 2014 World Junior Championships in Athletics in the 110 metres hurdles in Eugene, Oregon. His time of 13.05 seconds beat the Jamaican national junior record of Omar McLeod set the previous year.

In 2016, Mason won the bronze medal at the 2016 NACAC U23 Championships in Athletics in the 110 m hurdles, running 13.67 seconds to finish fourth on the day, later upgraded to a bronze medal after Puerto Rican race winner Will Barnes was disqualified due to a antidoping rules violation.

=== Senior career ===
2017 - 2022

For most of his senior career thus far, he was beset with injuries that made him unable to perform or stalled his performance at competitions. However, both him and his coach continued to work on different training programs to attain maximum execution.

2023

In July 2023, Mason finished fourth at the Jamaican Athletics Championships in Kingston in the 110 metres hurdles in 13.22 seconds. Shortly afterwards, he finished third at the Diamond League event in Silesia in 13.29 seconds.

The following month, competing in Bern, Switzerland he ran a meet record 13.22 seconds to win the 110m hurdles event at the Citrus meeting at the Wankdorf Stadium. He was named as an alternate for the Jamaican team which competed at the 2023 World Athletics Championships in Budapest.

2024

In February 2024, he ran a new personal best 60m hurdles time of 7.65 seconds as he finished runner-up to compatriot Rasheed Broadbell in Fayetteville, Arkansas. He was subsequently selected to run for Jamaica at the 2024 World Athletics Indoor Championships in Glasgow where he did not qualify to the semifinals running 7.86 in the heats for 6th place. In July 2024, he was officially selected as a reserve for the Jamaican team at the 2024 Paris Olympics.

2025

Mason ran 13.22 seconds for the 100m hurdles to finish third overall at the 2025 Jamaican Athletics Championships in Kingston on 29 June 2025. After being selected for the Jamaican team he won the bronze medal over 110 metres hurdles at the 2025 World Athletics Championships in Tokyo, Japan, having equalled his personal best time of 13.12 seconds in both the semi-final and the final.

2026

At the Velocity Fest 19 in Kingston on April 19, he clocked a personal best 10.15s (+1.4) in the 100 metres improving from 10.71s in 2023. In September, he competed in the 110 m hurdles at the inaugural World Ultimate Championship in Budapest.

== Personal life ==
Mason grew up in Kingston, and he attended Jamaica College in Kingston.
