= 2012 World Junior Championships in Athletics – Men's 100 metres =

The men's 100 metres at the 2012 World Junior Championships in Athletics was held at the Estadi Olímpic Lluís Companys on 10 and 11 July.

== Medalists ==
Gold	Adam Gemili; Great Britain
Silver	Aaron Ernest; United States
Bronze	Odean Skeen; Jamaica

== Records ==
Standing records prior to the 2012 World Junior Championships in Athletics
World Junior Record	Darrel Brown (TRI)	10.01	Paris, France	24 August 2003
World Junior Record	Jeff Demps (USA)	10.01	Eugene, United States	28 June 2008
Championship Record	Darrel Brown (TRI)	10.09	Kingston, Jamaica	17 July 2002
World Junior Leading	Adam Gemili (GBR)	10.08	Regensburg, Germany	2 June 2012
Broken records during the 2012 World Junior Championships in Athletics
Championship Record & World Junior Leading	Adam Gemili (GBR)	10.05	Barcelona, Spain	11 July 2012

== Results ==
=== Heats ===
Qualification: The first 2 of each heat (Q) and the 6 fastest times (q) qualified

Rank	Heat	Lane	Name	Nationality	Time	Note
1	2	5	Adam Gemili	Great Britain	10.37	Q
2	5	2	Tyreek Hill	United States	10.37	Q
3	7	7	Aaron Ernest	United States	10.39	Q
4	4	4	Carlos Nascimento	Portugal	10.43	Q, PB
5	8	9	Jazeel Murphy	Jamaica	10.45	Q
6	4	9	Hassan Taftian	Iran	10.48	Q
7	7	9	Chijindu Ujah	Great Britain	10.48	Q
8	3	3	Zharnel Hughes	Anguilla	10.50	Q
9	9	5	Odean Skeen	Jamaica	10.50	Q
10	6	4	Kazuma Oseto	Japan	10.50	Q
11	7	8	Cejhae Greene	Antigua and Barbuda	10.52	q
12	8	5	Patrick Domogala	Germany	10.56	Q
13	6	9	Hugh Donovan	Australia	10.57	Q
14	9	9	Kazuki Kanamori	Japan	10.57	Q, PB
15	1	3	Teray Smith	Bahamas	10.58	Q
16	3	2	Yousef Ali Al-Shalani	Saudi Arabia	10.59	Q
17	9	2	Fana Mofokeng	South Africa	10.59	q
18	1	9	Giovanni Galbieri	Italy	10.60	Q
19	1	7	Siphelo Ngquboza	South Africa	10.60	Q
20	6	2	Devon Rittinger	Canada	10.62	q
21	9	4	Eetu Rantala	Finland	10.64	q
22	8	8	Ben Jaworski	Australia	10.65	q
23	1	5	Titus Kafunda	Zambia	10.67	
24	2	4	Zhenye Xie	China	10.68	Q
25	5	3	Mobolade Ajomale	Canada	10.68	Q
26	4	5	Robert Polkowski	Germany	10.68	
27	4	8	Abdelghani Zghali	Morocco	10.68	
28	2	2	Mike Mokamba Nyang'Au	Kenya	10.70	
29	9	6	Héctor Ruiz	Mexico	10.70	
30	5	9	Tahir Walsh	Antigua and Barbuda	10.71	
31	5	5	Pierre Chalus	France	10.72	
32	6	3	Jonathan Holder	Trinidad and Tobago	10.73	
33	8	7	Denis Ogarkov	Russia	10.73	
34	2	9	Khalfani Muhammad	Puerto Rico	10.76	
35	1	4	Rodrigo Rocha	Brazil	10.78	
36	7	6	Yuri Monteiro	Brazil	10.78	
37	9	8	Marek Bakalár	Czech Republic	10.78	
38	8	6	Anthony Farrington	Bahamas	10.78	
39	3	4	Artur Bruno Rojas	Bolivia	10.80	
40	6	6	J'maal Alexander	British Virgin Islands	10.80	NJR
41	6	5	Hensley Paulina	Netherlands	10.81	
42	7	5	Aleksandr Eliseev	Russia	10.83	
43	4	3	Ashron Sobers	Trinidad and Tobago	10.84	
44	8	3	Dumisani Bhebhe	Zimbabwe	10.84	
45	5	7	Mateo Edward	Panama	10.86	
46	7	3	Georgy Gusto	France	10.87	
47	3	7	Andy Martínez	Peru	10.88	
48	1	2	Eid Abdulla Al-Kuwari	Qatar	10.95	
49	6	8	César Ramírez	Mexico	10.97	
50	2	8	Kamil Bijowski	Poland	10.99	
51	2	1	Kodi Harman	New Zealand	10.99	
52	3	9	Volodymyr Suprun	Ukraine	11.00	
53	1	6	Ali Omar Abdulla Al Doseri	Bahrain	11.02	SB
54	5	8	Zdenek Stromšík	Czech Republic	11.02	
55	7	1	Fiacre Bahorou	Benin	11.05	
56	3	5	Yanis Dallay	Comoros	11.07	PB
57	9	7	Davron Atabaev	Tajikistan	11.11	
58	5	4	Adrián Pérez	Spain	11.18	
59	6	7	Yang Zi Xian	Macau	11.24	
60	2	6	A. Kumara Makkawitaliyanage	Sri Lanka	11.32	
61	7	4	Siueni Filimone	Tonga	11.41	PB
62	9	3	Samuel Olo Manel	Equatorial Guinea	11.46	PB
63	4	6	Md Ariful Islam	Bangladesh	11.48	PB
64	3	6	Archel Evrard Biniakounou	Republic of the Congo	11.49	PB
65	5	6	Muhammad Sajid	Pakistan	11.76	PB
66	7	2	Nicholas Chianese	San Marino	11.76	PB
67	2	3	George Manebona	Solomon Islands	11.78	PB
68	8	2	Elama Fa’atonu	American Samoa	11.90	PB
69	2	7	Sidney Quaresma	São Tomé and Príncipe	11.96	PB
70	1	8	Andre Lopes de Pina	Guinea-Bissau	12.02	PB
71	8	4	Daniel Philimon	Vanuatu	13.31	SB
–	3	8	Tamunotonye Briggs	Nigeria	–	DNS
–	4	2	Okeudo Jonathan Nmaju	Nigeria	–	DNS
–	4	7	Oumar Diallo	Guinea	–	DNS

=== Semifinal ===
Qualification: The first 2 of each heat (Q) and the 2 fastest times (q) qualified

Rank	Heat	Lane	Name	Nationality	Time	Note
1	2	5	Adam Gemili	Great Britain	10.18	Q
2	3	6	Aaron Ernest	United States	10.21	Q
3	1	5	Tyreek Hill	United States	10.25	Q
4	1	6	Jazeel Murphy	Jamaica	10.25	Q, PB
5	1	4	Chijindu Ujah	Great Britain	10.40	q, PB
6	3	5	Carlos Nascimento	Portugal	10.42	Q, PB
7	3	7	Odean Skeen	Jamaica	10.43	q
8	1	7	Teray Smith	Bahamas	10.44	
9	3	4	Hassan Taftian	Iran	10.46	
10	1	9	Siphelo Ngquboza	South Africa	10.47	
11	3	8	Giovanni Galbieri	Italy	10.48	PB
12	2	9	Zhenye Xie	China	10.54	Q
13	1	3	Cejhae Greene	Antigua and Barbuda	10.55	
14	2	4	Patrick Domogala	Germany	10.55	
15	2	6	Zharnel Hughes	Anguilla	10.55	
16	2	7	Kazuma Oseto	Japan	10.56	
17	2	2	Mobolade Ajomale	Canada	10.56	PB
18	3	9	Yousef Ali Al-Shalani	Saudi Arabia	10.57	PB
19	1	7	Kazuki Kanamori	Japan	10.63	
20	2	8	Hugh Donovan	Australia	10.65	
21	3	3	Devon Rittinger	Canada	10.65	
22	2	3	Ben Jaworski	Australia	10.68	
23	3	2	Fana Mofokeng	South Africa	10.69	
24	1	2	Eetu Rantala	Finland	10.73	

=== Final ===
Wind: +0.1 m/s

Rank	Lane	Name	Nationality	Time	Note
1st place, gold medalist(s)	6	Adam Gemili	Great Britain	10.05	WJL, CR
2nd place, silver medalist(s)	7	Aaron Ernest	United States	10.17	PB
3rd place, bronze medalist(s)	3	Odean Skeen	Jamaica	10.28	PB
4	4	Tyreek Hill	United States	10.29	
5	5	Jazeel Murphy	Jamaica	10.29	
6	2	Chijindu Ujah	Great Britain	10.39	PB
7	9	Carlos Nascimento	Portugal	10.41	PB
8	8	Zhenye Xie	China	10.59	

== Participation ==
According to an unofficial count, 71 athletes from 55 countries participated in the event.

- American Samoa (1)
- Anguilla (1)
- Antigua and Barbuda (2)
- Australia (2)
- Bahamas (2)
- Bahrain (1)
- Bangladesh (1)
- Benin (1)
- Bolivia (1)
- Brazil (2)
- British Virgin Islands (1)
- Canada (2)
- China (1)
- Comoros (1)
- Congo (1)
- Czech Republic (2)
- Equatorial Guinea (1)
- Finland (1)
- France (2)
- Germany (2)
- Guinea-Bissau (1)
- Iran (1)
- Italy (1)
- Jamaica (2)
- Japan (2)
- Kenya (1)
- Macau (1)
- Mexico (2)
- Morocco (1)
- Netherlands (1)
- New Zealand (1)
- Pakistan (1)
- Panama (1)
- Peru (1)
- Poland (1)
- Portugal (1)
- Puerto Rico (1)
- Qatar (1)
- Russia (2)
- San Marino (1)
- São Tomé and Príncipe (1)
- Saudi Arabia (1)
- Solomon Islands (1)
- South Africa (2)
- Spain (1)
- Sri Lanka (1)
- Tajikistan (1)
- Tonga (1)
- Trinidad and Tobago (2)
- Ukraine (1)
- United Kingdom (2)
- United States (2)
- Vanuatu (1)
- Zambia (1)
- Zimbabwe (1)
