= 2012 World Junior Championships in Athletics – Men's 200 metres =

The men's 200 metres at the 2012 World Junior Championships in Athletics was held at the Estadi Olímpic Lluís Companys on 12 and 13 July.

== Medalists ==
Gold	Silver	Bronze
Delano Williams; Turks and Caicos Islands	Aaron Ernest; United States	Tyreek Hill; United States

== Records ==
Prior to the competition, the existing world junior and championship records were as follows.

World Junior Record	Usain Bolt (JAM)	19.93	Devonshire, Bermuda	11 April 2004
Championship Record	Andrew Howe (ITA)	20.28	Grosseto, Italy	16 July 2004
World Junior Leading	Tyreek Hill (USA)	20.14	Orlando, United States	26 May 2012

== Results ==
=== Heats ===
Qualification: The first 2 of each heat (Q) and the 8 fastest times (q) qualified

Rank	Heat	Lane	Name	Nationality	Time	Note
1	6	5	Delano Williams	Turks and Caicos Islands	20.66	Q
2	8	5	Julian Forte	Jamaica	20.76	Q
3	4	7	David Bolarinwa	Great Britain	20.78	Q
4	4	9	Teray Smith	Bahamas	20.79	Q, PB
5	1	8	Zhenye Xie	China	20.86	Q
6	8	7	Akiyuki Hashimoto	Japan	20.89	Q, SB
7	6	7	Zharnel Hughes	Anguilla	20.90	Q, NR
8	1	2	Karol Zalewski	Poland	20.95	Q, PB
9	4	3	Marlon Laidlaw-Allen	Canada	20.98	q, PB
10	2	5	Aaron Ernest	United States	21.01	Q
11	5	9	Siphelo Ngquboza	South Africa	21.04	Q
12	3	5	Yoandys Lescay	Cuba	21.07	Q
13	2	7	Aska Cambridge	Japan	21.10	Q
14	5	4	Jereem Richards	Trinidad and Tobago	21.12	Q
15	8	9	Patrick Domogala	Germany	21.19	q
16	4	2	Jonathan Farinha	Trinidad and Tobago	21.19	q
17	1	9	Cejhae Greene	Antigua and Barbuda	21.20	q
18	6	2	Michal Desensky	Czech Republic	21.24	q
19	3	4	Khalfani Muhammad	Puerto Rico	21.25	Q
20	7	7	Tyreek Hill	United States	21.29	Q
21	6	3	Josh Street	Great Britain	21.30	q
22	5	8	Okeudo Jonathan Nmaju	Nigeria	21.31	q, PB
23	2	6	Óscar Husillos	Spain	21.33	q, SB
24	3	8	Titus Kafunda	Zambia	21.34	
24	8	3	Ken Romain	France	21.34	
26	7	3	Solomon Afull	Ghana	21.35	Q
27	3	9	Mickael-Meba Zeze	France	21.36	
28	8	8	Carlos Nascimento	Portugal	21.38	PB
29	2	2	Blake Bartlett	Bahamas	21.41	
30	3	2	Drelan Bramwell	Canada	21.46	
31	1	7	Simon Schütz	Germany	21.47	
31	4	5	Tykwendo Tracey	Jamaica	21.47	
33	1	8	Jan Jirka	Czech Republic	21.50	
33	1	5	Hugh Donovan	Australia	21.50	
35	7	6	Abdelghani Zghali	Morocco	21.53	
36	2	3	Tahir Walsh	Antigua and Barbuda	21.57	
37	7	2	Abdullah Ahmed Abkar	Saudi Arabia	21.58	
37	5	8	Jonathan Oliver Permal	Mauritius	21.58	
37	7	8	Marcus Lawler	Ireland	21.58	
40	1	3	Dumisani Bhebhe	Zimbabwe	21.61	NJR
41	5	5	Leandro De Araújo	Brazil	21.62	
42	5	7	Ilya Siratsiuk	Belarus	21.62	
43	2	8	Ben Jaworski	Australia	21.65	
44	6	4	Kyle Webb	Bermuda	21.71	
44	3	6	Omri Harosh	Israel	21.71	
44	6	9	Volodymyr Suprun	Ukraine	21.71	
47	4	7	Héctor Ruiz	Mexico	21.80	
47	4	2	Ali Hassan Al Jassim	Qatar	21.80	
49	5	3	Silvan Wicki	Switzerland	21.81	
49	5	2	Juan Carlos Alanis	Mexico	21.81	
51	8	2	Artur Bruno Rojas	Bolivia	21.92	
52	6	6	Kim Jae-deok	South Korea	21.96	SB
53	8	4	Kodi Harman	New Zealand	21.98	SB
54	8	6	Furkan Sen	Turkey	22.16	
55	3	3	Luca Valbonesi	Italy	22.19	
56	7	9	Riste Pandev	Macedonia	22.22	PB
57	4	7	Jerai Torres	Gibraltar	22.29	PB
58	2	4	Deandre Rawlins	United States Virgin Islands	22.73	
59	8	1	Mahmoud Alloh	Palestine	23.97	PB
60	7	5	Paul Dimalanta	Guam	23.98	PB
61	1	4	Thomas Farrugia	Malta	26.00	
	6	8	Fausto Desalu	Italy	DSQ	
	7	1	Bernardo Baloyes	Colombia	DNS	
	2	9	Mateo Edward	Panama	DNS	
	7	4	Rodrigo Rocha	Brazil	DNS	
	3	7	Tamunotonye Briggs	Nigeria	DNS	

=== Semi-finals ===
Qualification: The first 2 of each heat (Q) and the 2 fastest times (q) qualified

Rank	Heat	Lane	Name	Nationality	Time	Note
1	1	5	Julian Forte	Jamaica	20.83	Q
2	3	6	David Bolarinwa	Great Britain	20.85	Q
3	2	6	Karol Zalewski	Poland	20.93	Q, PB
4	2	4	Delano Williams	Turks and Caicos Islands	20.94	Q
5	3	7	Tyreek Hill	United States	21.00	Q
6	1	7	Aaron Ernest	United States	21.06	Q
6	1	4	Teray Smith	Bahamas	21.06	q
6	3	4	Zhenye Xie	China	21.06	q
9	1	9	Jereem Richards	Trinidad and Tobago	21.14	
10	3	5	Akiyuki Hashimoto	Japan	21.20	
11	2	9	Aska Cambridge	Japan	21.24	
11	2	5	Siphelo Ngquboza	South Africa	21.24	
13	1	8	Marlon Laidlaw-Allen	Canada	21.27	
14	2	7	Yoandys Lescay	Cuba	21.27	
15	1	3	Josh Street	Great Britain	21.36	
16	3	8	Khalfani Muhammad	Puerto Rico	21.45	
17	3	3	Okeudo Jonathan Nmaju	Nigeria	21.46	
18	3	2	Michal Desensky	Czech Republic	21.57	
19	2	8	Patrick Domogala	Germany	21.58	
20	3	9	Solomon Afull	Ghana	21.63	
21	2	2	Jonathan Farinha	Trinidad and Tobago	21.72	
22	2	3	Óscar Husillos	Spain	21.82	
	1	6	Cejhae Greene	Antigua and Barbuda	DNS	
	1	2	Zharnel Hughes	Anguilla	DNS	

=== Final ===
Wind: -0.4 m/s

Rank	Lane	Name	Nationality	Time	Note
1st place, gold medalist(s)	6	Delano Williams	Turks and Caicos Islands	20.48	NJ
2nd place, silver medalist(s)	5	Aaron Ernest	United States	20.53	PB
3rd place, bronze medalist(s)	4	Tyreek Hill	United States	20.54	
4	7	Karol Zalewski	Poland	20.54	NJ
5	3	Zhenye Xie	China	20.66	
6	9	David Bolarinwa	Great Britain	20.69	PB
7	8	Teray Smith	Bahamas	20.99	
8	2	Julian Forte	Jamaica	21.00	

== Participation ==
According to an unofficial count, 62 athletes from 48 countries participated in the event.

- Anguilla (1)
- Antigua and Barbuda (2)
- Australia (2)
- Bahamas (2)
- Belarus (1)
- Bermuda (1)
- Bolivia (1)
- Brazil (1)
- Canada (2)
- China (1)
- Cuba (1)
- Czech Republic (2)
- France (2)
- Germany (2)
- Ghana (1)
- Gibraltar (1)
- Guam (1)
- Ireland (1)
- Israel (1)
- Italy (2)
- Jamaica (2)
- Japan (2)
- Macedonia (1)
- Malta (1)
- Mauritius (1)
- Mexico (2)
- Morocco (1)
- New Zealand (1)
- Nigeria (1)
- Palestine (1)
- Poland (1)
- Portugal (1)
- Puerto Rico (1)
- Qatar (1)
- Saudi Arabia (1)
- South Africa (1)
- South Korea (1)
- Spain (1)
- Switzerland (1)
- Trinidad and Tobago (2)
- Turkey (1)
- Turks and Caicos Islands (1)
- Ukraine (1)
- United Kingdom (2)
- United States (2)
- U.S. Virgin Islands (1)
- Zambia (1)
- Zimbabwe (1)
