= 2013 European Athletics U23 Championships – Men's 200 metres =

The Men's 200 metres event at the 2013 European Athletics U23 Championships was held in Tampere, Finland, at Ratina Stadium on 12 and 13 July.

== Medalists ==
Gold	Karol Zalewski; Poland
Silver	Danny Talbot; United Kingdom
Bronze	Pavel Maslák; Czech Republic

== Results ==
=== Final ===
13 July 2013 / 18:50
Wind: -0.3 m/s

Rank	Name	Nationality	Lane	Reaction Time	Time	Notes
1st place, gold medalist(s)	Karol Zalewski	Poland	3	0.167	20.41	PB
2nd place, silver medalist(s)	Danny Talbot	United Kingdom	8	0.201	20.46	
3rd place, bronze medalist(s)	Pavel Maslák	Czech Republic	4	0.175	20.49	NR
4	Adam Gemili	United Kingdom	5	0.177	20.51	
5	Bruno Hortelano	Spain	6	0.160	20.70	
6	Petar Kremenski	Bulgaria	7	0.189	20.85	
7	David Bolarinwa	United Kingdom	1	0.153	20.85	
8	Jeffrey John	France	2	0.172	21.01	

=== Heats ===
Qualified: First 2 in each heat (Q) and 2 best performers (q) advance to the Final

==== Summary ====
Rank	Name	Nationality	Time	Notes
1	Adam Gemili	United Kingdom	20.46	Q
2	Pavel Maslák	Czech Republic	20.51	Q NR
3	Karol Zalewski	Poland	20.53	Q
4	Bruno Hortelano	Spain	20.58	Q PB
5	Danny Talbot	United Kingdom	20.68	Q
6	David Bolarinwa	United Kingdom	20.84	q
7	Jeffrey John	France	20.94	q
8	Petar Kremenski	Bulgaria	21.01	Q
9	Robin Erewa	Germany	21.02	
10	Adrià Burriel	Spain	21.15	
11	Jan Jirka	Czech Republic	21.15	PB
12	Lukáš Šťastný	Czech Republic	21.17	
13	Benjamin Olsson	Sweden	21.21	SB
14	Adam Pawłowski	Poland	21.28	
15	Markus Ellisaar	Estonia	21.63	PB
16	Jani Koskela	Finland	21.64	
17	Carl Emil Kåshagen	Norway	21.69	
18	Dávid Ónodi	Hungary	21.70	
19	Omri Harosh	Israel	21.87	
20	Gergely Viktor Bézsenyi	Hungary	21.88	
21	Denis Zhvania	Georgia	22.06	
22	Steve Camilleri	Malta	22.44	

==== Details ====
===== Heat 1 =====
12 July 2013 / 21:05 Wind: -0.9 m/s

Rank	Name	Nationality	Lane	Reaction Time	Time	Notes
1	Pavel Maslák	Czech Republic	7	0.187	20.51	Q NR
2	Bruno Hortelano	Spain	1	0.150	20.58	Q PB
3	David Bolarinwa	United Kingdom	2	0.161	20.84	q
4	Jeffrey John	France	4	0.173	20.94	q
5	Benjamin Olsson	Sweden	5	0.177	21.21	SB
6	Markus Ellisaar	Estonia	8	0.166	21.63	PB
7	Gergely Viktor Bézsenyi	Hungary	6	0.146	21.88	
8	Steve Camilleri	Malta	3	0.163	22.44	

===== Heat 2 =====
12 July 2013 / 21:12 Wind: -1.5 m/s

Rank	Name	Nationality	Lane	Reaction Time	Time	Notes
1	Karol Zalewski	Poland	6	0.155	20.53	Q
2	Danny Talbot	United Kingdom	8	0.190	20.68	Q
3	Adrià Burriel	Spain	4	0.183	21.15	
4	Jan Jirka	Czech Republic	7	0.164	21.15	PB
5	Carl Emil Kåshagen	Norway	5	0.159	21.69	
6	Dávid Ónodi	Hungary	2	0.177	21.70	
7	Denis Zhvania	Georgia	3	0.182	22.06	

===== Heat 3 =====
12 July 2013 / 21:19 Wind: -0.7 m/s

Rank	Name	Nationality	Lane	Reaction Time	Time	Notes
1	Adam Gemili	United Kingdom	3	0.183	20.46	Q
2	Petar Kremenski	Bulgaria	5	0.207	21.01	Q
3	Robin Erewa	Germany	7	0.163	21.02	
4	Lukáš Šťastný	Czech Republic	6	0.189	21.17	
5	Adam Pawłowski	Poland	8	0.145	21.28	
6	Jani Koskela	Finland	2	0.175	21.64	
7	Omri Harosh	Israel	4	0.189	21.87	

== Participation ==
According to an unofficial count, 22 athletes from 15 countries participated in the event.

- Bulgaria (1)
- Czech Republic (3)
- Estonia (1)
- Finland (1)
- France (1)
- Georgia (1)
- Germany (1)
- Hungary (2)
- Israel (1)
- Malta (1)
- Norway (1)
- Poland (2)
- Spain (2)
- Sweden (1)
- United Kingdom (3)
