= Nick Waisome =

American football player (born 1992)

No. 6
- Position: Cornerback

Personal information
- Born: March 20, 1992 (age 34); Groveland, Florida, U.S.
- Listed height: 5 ft 10 in (1.78 m)
- Listed weight: 182 lb (83 kg)

Career information
- High school: Groveland (FL) South Lake
- College: Florida State
- NFL draft: 2015: undrafted

Awards and highlights
- BCS national champion (2014)
- Stats at Pro Football Reference

Nick Waisome (born March 20, 1992) is an American former football defensive back. He attended Florida State University.

== Early life ==
A native of Groveland, Florida, Waisome attended South Lake High School, where he was teammates with Jonotthan Harrison. Regarded as a four-star recruit by Rivals.com, Waisome was listed as the No. 8 cornerback prospect in his class.

== College career ==
After playing exclusively on special teams during his true freshman year, Waisome became starting cornerback for the Seminoles in 2012, after Greg Reid was dismissed. He started all 14 games at cornerback, recording 21 tackles on the season. He defended eight passes and caught an interception against Clemson.
