= Jonotthan Harrison =

American football player (born 1991)

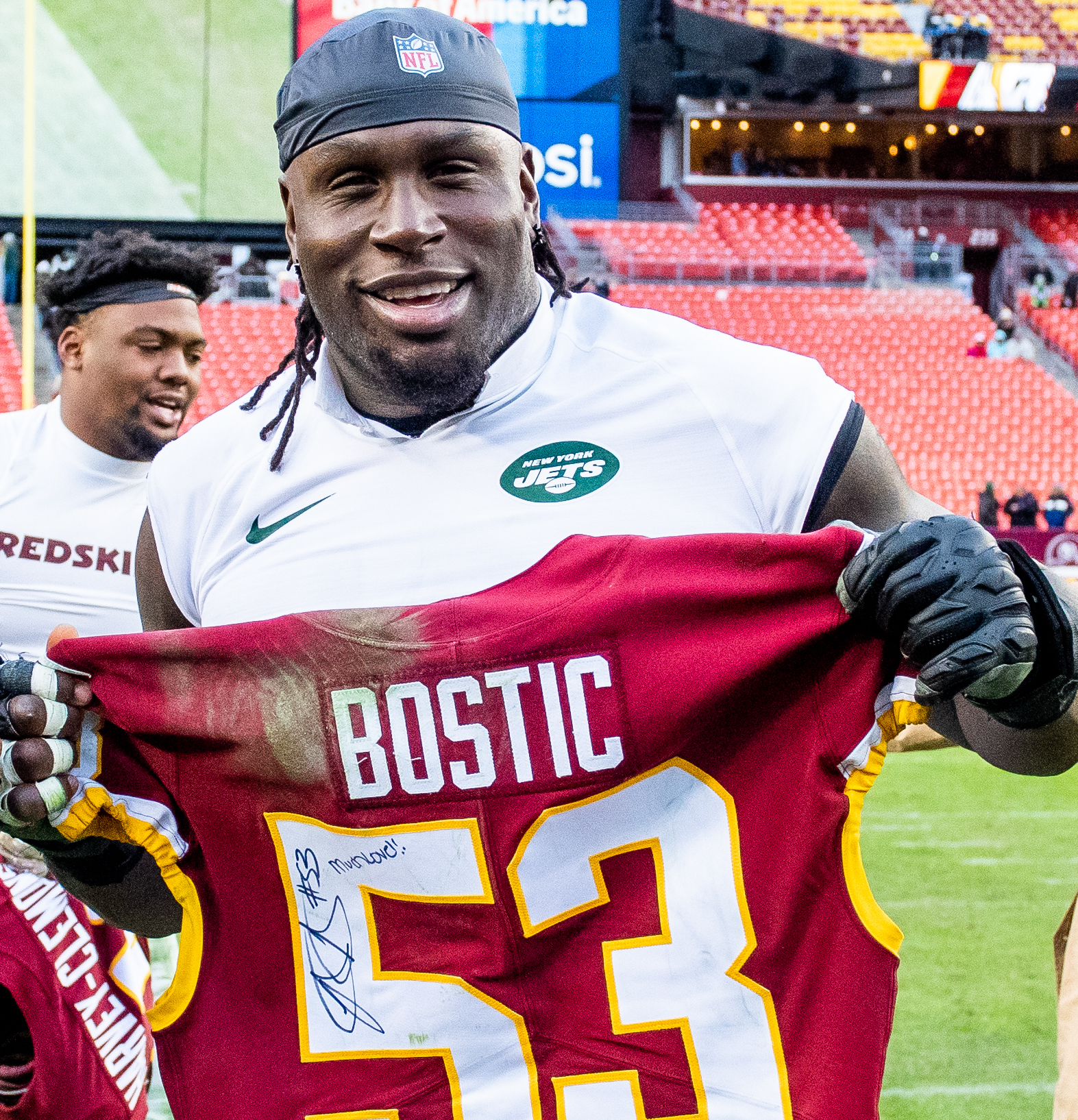
- Harrison with the New York Jets in 2019

No. 72, 78, 60
- Position: Center

Personal information
- Born: August 25, 1991 (age 35); Groveland, Florida, U.S.
- Listed height: 6 ft 4 in (1.93 m)
- Listed weight: 300 lb (136 kg)

Career information
- High school: South Lake (Groveland)
- College: Florida (2009–2013)
- NFL draft: 2014: undrafted

Career history
- Indianapolis Colts (2014–2016); New York Jets (2017–2019); Buffalo Bills (2020); New York Giants (2021); Atlanta Falcons (2022–2023); Miami Dolphins (2023)

Career NFL statistics
- Games played: 86
- Games started: 42
- Stats at Pro Football Reference

Jonotthan Harrison (born August 25, 1991) is an American former professional football player who was a center in the National Football League (NFL). He played college football for the Florida Gators. After not being selected during the 2014 NFL draft, Harrison signed with the Indianapolis Colts as an undrafted free agent.

== Early life ==
Harrison attended South Lake High School in Groveland, Florida, where he was a letterman in football and track for the Eagles. An offensive lineman on the Eagles football varsity, Harrison was teammates with Jeff Demps and Nick Waisome. He participated in the Offense/Defense All-American Bowl and was named Offense/Defense All-American Bowl Offensive Lineman of the Year. The Orlando Sentinel recognized him as a first-team All-Central Florida selection. In track & field, he competed in the shot put and the discus.

== College career ==
Harrison accepted an athletic scholarship to attend the University of Florida, where he played for coach Urban Meyer and coach Will Muschamp's Florida Gators football teams from 2010 to 2013. He was an early enrollee in January 2009, and redshirted as a true freshman during the 2009 football season. As a senior team captain in 2013, he started all 12 games at center. During his four-year college career, he appeared in 51 games for the Gators, making 39 starts. He graduated from the University of Florida with a bachelor's degree in criminal justice and anthropology in 2013.

== Professional career ==
Harrison was rated the ninth best center in the 2014 NFL draft by NFLDraftScout.com. Nolan Nawrocki of NFL.com projected Harrison as a fourth or fifth round pick. Chris Burke of SI.com projected Harrison as a seventh round pick.

Pre-draft measurables
Height	Weight	Arm length	Hand span	40-yard dash	10-yard split	20-yard split	20-yard shuttle	Three-cone drill	Vertical jump	Broad jump	Bench press
6 ft 3 1/2 in (1.92 m)	304 lb (138 kg)	33 3/8 in (0.85 m)	9 7/8 in (0.25 m)	5.15 s	1.83 s	3.00 s	4.86 s	7.97 s	27.0 in (0.69 m)	9 ft 5 in (2.87 m)	27 reps
All values from NFL Combine

=== Indianapolis Colts ===
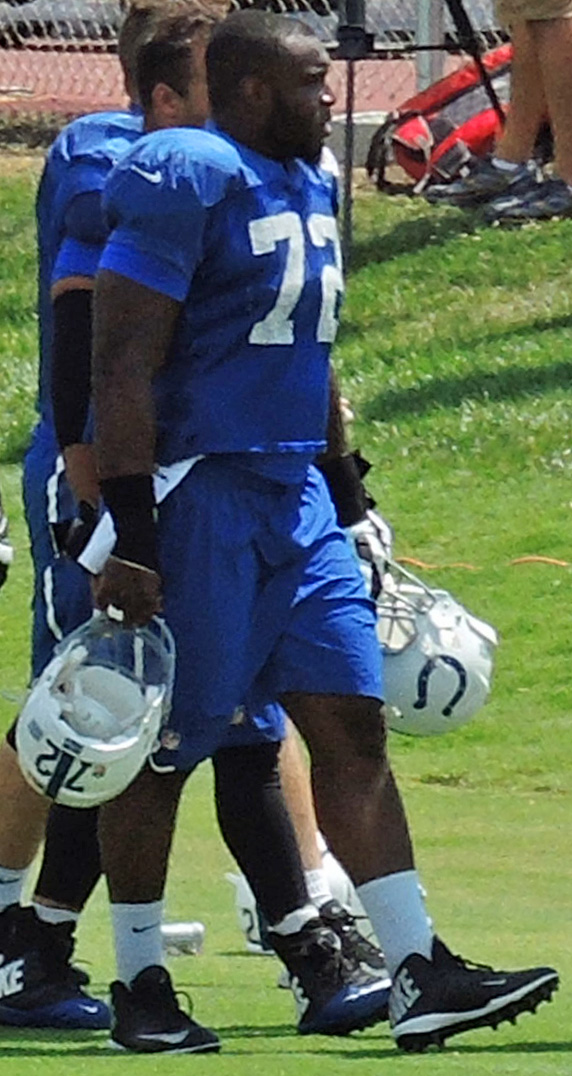
Harrison in 2015 at training camp

Harrison was signed by the Indianapolis Colts on May 12, 2014, after going undrafted in the 2014 NFL Draft. He made his NFL debut on September 7, 2014 against the Denver Broncos. Harrison appeared in 15 games in 2014, and 10 as a starter. In 2015, he played in all 16 games, starting in nine at center, and in 2016 he played in 13 games with four starts.

=== New York Jets ===
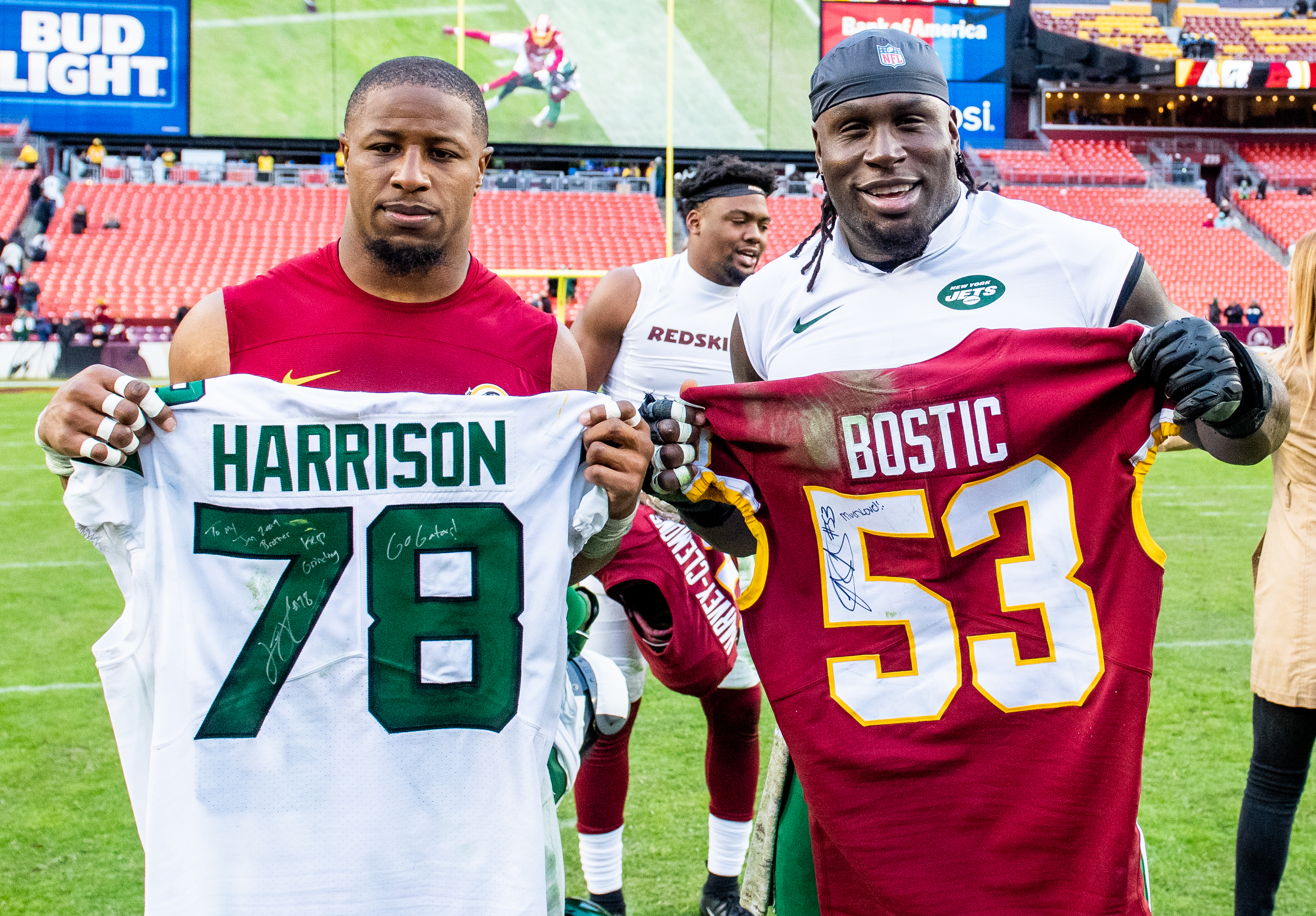
Harrison alongside former college teammate Jon Bostic in a game against the Washington Redskins

On March 28, 2017, Harrison signed with the New York Jets. He played in eight games with one start for the Jets in 2017.

On March 28, 2018, Harrison re-signed with the Jets. He played in all 16 games, starting eight at center.

On March 9, 2019, Harrison re-signed with the Jets. He was released on September 5, 2020.

=== Buffalo Bills ===
On September 19, 2020, Harrison was signed to the Buffalo Bills practice squad. He was elevated to the active roster on December 18 for the team's week 15 game against the Broncos, and reverted to the practice squad after the game.

=== New York Giants ===
Harrison signed with the New York Giants on February 24, 2021. He was released on August 31, 2021. He re-signed with their practice squad on September 22, 2021. On October 9, 2021, Harrison suffered an Achilles injury and was placed on injury reserve.

=== Atlanta Falcons ===
On June 16, 2022, Harrison was signed by the Atlanta Falcons. He was released on August 30. He was re-signed to the practice squad on November 8. He signed a reserve/future contract on January 9, 2023.

On August 29, 2023, Harrison was released by the Falcons.

=== Miami Dolphins ===
On December 13, 2023, Harrison was signed by the Miami Dolphins to their active roster.

== See also ==
- List of Florida Gators in the NFL draft
- List of University of Florida alumni
