= Aaron Ernest =

American sprinter (born 1993)

Personal information
- Born: November 8, 1993 (age 32) New Orleans, Louisiana, U.S.
- Height: 6 ft 0 in (1.83 m)
- Weight: 170 lb (77 kg)

Sport
- Sport: Running USA Sprints
- Events: 100 metres, 200 metres
- College team: LSU Tigers

Achievements and titles
- Personal bests: 100m: 10.04(w) 10.12 (Eugene 2015); 200m: 20.14 (Baton Rouge, Louisiana 2014)
Medal record
Men's athletics
Representing the United States
World Junior Championships
Gold medal – first place	2012 Barcelona	4×100 m relay
Silver medal – second place	2012 Barcelona	100 m
Silver medal – second place	2012 Barcelona	200 m

Aaron Troy Ernest (born November 8, 1993) is an American sprinter who specializes in the 100 meters and 200 metres. He graduated from Homewood High School in Homewood, Alabama and competed for the LSU Tigers from 2012 to 2015.

A native of Baton Rouge, Louisiana, Ernest relocated to Alabama where he attended Homewood High School. He was an All-USA high school Track and Field team selection by USA Today in 2011. His 2011 season bests in 100 m (10.17s) and 200 m (20.86 s).

At the 85th Texas Relays in March 2012, Ernest placed first in the 100 metres in the university group, behind only Jeff Demps of the University of Florida. Classified as a junior athlete for the 2012 season, Ernest is eligible for the 2012 World Junior Championships in Athletics. His 100 m season best of 10.15 seconds was second among juniors in the 2012 season, behind only Adam Gemili.

Also a standout wide receiver at Homewood High School, Ernest received numerous football scholarship offers, including Kentucky, Louisiana Tech, Southern Miss, UAB, and Wake Forest. Ernest then went on to attend Rookie Minicamp for the Seattle Seahawks in 2018.

== Competition record ==
Year	Competition	Venue	Position	Event	Notes
Representing the United States
2014	NACAC U-23 Championships	Kamloops, British Columbia, Canada	5th	200m	20.81 (wind: +1.5 m/s)
2014	NACAC U-23 Championships	Kamloops, British Columbia, Canada	1st	4 × 100 m relay	38.47
