= Oversigning =

Oversigning (also spelled over-signing) is an unofficial term for the practice of American college athletic departments signing prospective student-athletes to a National Letter of Intent (NLI) that may exceed the maximum number of athletic scholarships permitted by the National Collegiate Athletic Association (NCAA). The NCAA limits the total number of scholarships that may be awarded in all of its sponsored sports, and in football also limits the number of scholarships awarded in a given year. Those limits differ by sport and the division in which that school participates. Most conferences have additional rules governing signing NLI.

NCAA Bylaw 15.5.6.1 limits FBS football programs to a total number of scholarships to 85 "counters" annually including 25 scholarships for "initial counters." Counters (NCAA Bylaw 15.02.3) are individuals who are receiving institutional financial aid that is countable against the aid limitations in a sport, initial counters (NCAA Bylaw 15.02.3.1) are individuals who are receiving countable financial aid in a sport for the first time. Bylaw 13.9.2.3 limits schools to signing 28 NLI from initial signing day through May 31.

Oversigning can occur in two ways. First, if a school signs a number of NLI that may bring their total number of counters above the NCAA limit of 85. Second would be to sign more than 25 NLI during the period between National Signing Day and May 31.

Oversigning occurs in other sports but has received the most attention from media members and fans, in regard to Division I FBS college football.

NCAA rules permit oversigning up to 28 NLI, though some college football fans view oversigning as unethical, arguing that it requires schools and coaches to be dishonest with young adult and adolescent recruits by promising them a roster spot and scholarship only to pull it before the person graduates or even makes the team.

== Atlantic Coast Conference ==
=== Miami ===
In a December 2010 feature on oversigning, ESPN's Outside the Lines profiled former University of Miami defensive lineman Stephen Wesley, who was told - in July 2010, just weeks before his senior season was to begin - that his scholarship would not be renewed. Miami and then-head coach Randy Shannon did not give an explanation for Wesley's dismissal from the team, but many believed (as Outside the Lines noted) Wesley was cut from the team to make room for Seantrel Henderson, who announced he would attend Miami just weeks before Wesley's dismissal.

== Big East Conference ==
In the 2011 offseason, the University of Louisville men's basketball team found itself with a roster of 18 players—five more than the NCAA limit of 13 scholarship players for that sport. In the 2010–11 season, the Cardinals had a 15-man roster, but two of these players were walk-ons, placing them within NCAA limits. Three scholarship players departed after the season, but coach Rick Pitino had initially signed a four-player freshman class, resulting in 14 scholarship players plus the two returning walk-ons. Then, coaching changes gave Pitino the opportunity to add a fifth freshman, former Tennessee commit Kevin Ware, and a future upperclass contributor, George Mason transfer Luke Hancock. These signings gave the Cardinals 16 scholarship players.

The situation was resolved when three returning scholarship players agreed to become walk-ons for the 2011–12 season. All had originally come to Louisville as walk-ons, but had earned scholarships. What made this situation especially unusual is that two of the three were seniors who were expected to start in the coming season. One of the senior walk-ons, Kyle Kuric, was the Cardinals' only returning double-figure scorer. The other senior walk-on, Chris Smith, was the Cardinals' third-leading returning scorer. Both were financially able to absorb being walk-ons—Kuric's parents are a neurosurgeon and a nurse practitioner, and Smith is the younger brother of NBA player J. R. Smith, who had paid his brother's way at U of L when he had to sit out the 2009–10 season as a transfer.

== Big Ten Conference ==
=== Ohio State ===
In an article posted June 25, 2011 by ABC news, James Jackson, former Ohio State University wide receiver, says he lost his scholarship due to oversigning. "They had an oversigning issue," Jackson said. "They had to free up a few scholarships, and coach (Jim) Tressel told me I probably wouldn't play and maybe Ohio State wasn't the place for me." Ohio State denies that Jackson was forced to transfer. "Our policy is as James Jackson stated: As long as a student-athlete maintains his/her academic standing, behaves appropriately and handles his/her responsibilities, he or she will retain their scholarship. We have no proof of any conversation between him and former head coach Jim Tressel".

After National Signing Day in 2011, Ohio State was oversigned by several players. During his Signing Day press conference, head coach Urban Meyer said he expected several recruits to not be signed, though Meyer did not give the specific number by which he had oversigned.

== Southeastern Conference ==
Several universities within the Southeastern Conference (SEC) have frequently been accused of oversigning. Florida, Georgia, and Vanderbilt are usually noted as exceptions within the SEC due to their having signed the fewest total recruits among SEC teams over the past decade. Georgia head coach Mark Richt has condemned the process, saying "I don't want to oversign, then tell one of the kids we've already got, 'You've got no value to us' and toss him aside. I'm not going to do that."

On February 1, 2011, Sports Illustrated published a letter from the president of the University of Florida, Bernie Machen, in which Machen condemned oversigning-related practices - including grayshirting and the excessive use of medical disqualifications - as "morally reprehensible" and "repugnant."

=== Houston Nutt Rule ===
In May 2009, the SEC passed a rule restricting its football teams to accepting no more than 28 National Letters of Intent each year. This move was widely viewed as a direct response to the University of Mississippi and its head coach, Houston Nutt, having promised 37 scholarships to new recruits for the 2009 season. Thus the rule is now commonly referred to as "The Houston Nutt Rule."

=== Alabama and Nick Saban ===
==== 2010 ====
===== WSJ Medical Scholarship Concerns =====
On September 24, 2010, the Wall Street Journal published an article suggesting the University of Alabama and its head coach, Nick Saban, encouraged some under-performing players to quit the team for medical reasons in order to gain a competitive edge.

Former Alabama linebacker Chuck Kirschman said "I'm still kind of bitter", and Saban encouraged him to accept the scholarship because of a back problem that Kirschman believes he could have played through. Kirschman said the school offered in the summer of 2009 to pay for his graduate degree in business, an offer he accepted, and that he still gets some of the same perks as players. Kirschman completed his MBA in Finance.

Charles Hoke, a former Alabama offensive lineman, took a medical scholarship in 2008 because of a shoulder problem, said the choice was left entirely up to him and was based on the many conversations he had with the team's doctors and trainers over the course of his junior year.

Jeramie Griffin tore an anterior cruciate ligament in his knee in August 2009. He said: "I came back in the spring and I was OK." Griffin said that he was surprised football staff told him he had failed a physical. Griffin said that Saban asked him what he wanted to do besides playing football, and that Saban floated the possibility of a medical scholarship and asked if Griffin was interested in student coaching. Griffin said he doesn't contest the results of the physical and said it was "basically my decision" to forgo the rest of his playing career.

Doug Walker, the school's associate athletic director for media relations, said "decisions about medical disqualifications for student-athletes are made by medical professionals and adhere to the parameters outlined by the NCAA and the Southeastern Conference."

On September 29, 2010, Saban responded to questions about the Wall Street Journal article: "We don't make the decision about medicals. I have nothing to do with that. Those are medical decisions made by our medical staff. I think we have one of the finest medical staffs in the country. I don't have any question about the fact every player we have given a medical to, it's been because of the medical opinion of the medical staff. Those guys should not continue to play football because it would put their future in tremendous risk. Those decisions are always made in the best interest of the player. Whether the player agrees with that or not, I can't control. I don't make the decision. They don't make the decision as players. That's why we have a medical staff."

===== WSJ Transfer Concerns =====
On November 25, 2010, the Journal reported that several former Alabama players claim Saban and Alabama lied about their reasons for leaving the school. On August 5, 2009, Saban made a statement in a press conference that included a reference to four players Price Hall, Brandon Fanney, Alonzo Lawrence and Jermaine Preyear. "These guys all did something. It doesn't make them bad people.…These guys didn't do what they were supposed to do here, whether it was for academic reasons or whatever. They're not going to be part of the program." The players told The Wall Street Journal they committed no such violations and that Alabama and Saban had only claimed as much so as to protect the image of their program in the eyes of future recruits.

Prince Hall, a starter and All-American as freshman, had been suspended for the 3rd time during the Spring according to published reports, the last being categorized as indefinite. Brandon Fanney, a 14-game starter from the previous season, had been suspended for rules violations during the Spring.

Preyear, who decided to transfer six months after enrolling during the Spring, said he chose to leave over concerns about playing time. "I don't know any rules I could have broken."

Alonzo Lawrence reasons for transfer were unclear, but according to his high school coach his problems at Alabama "wasn't anything major," and tied it to things like being late to team meetings. Lawrence transferred to Southern Miss before moving on to Mississippi Gulf Coast Community College.

===== Saban's Exchange with another Reporter =====
On April 15, 2008, Saban was asked by reporter Ian Rapoport how he was going to handle the numbers. Saban replied "I'm not worried about them. It'll all work out. I mean, the whole thing has a solution to every issue. You don't put yourself in a position where you don't know what's coming." Rapoport respond, "So you're not going to tell us?" to which Saban replied "We know how it has to be managed, and it will be managed. It's none of your business. Aiight? And don't give me this stuff about the fans' need to know, because they don't need to know. Don't even ask. Aiight?"

==== 2011 ====
In early 2011, after National Signing Day, Saban and the University of Alabama again became the subjects of heavy media criticism after they again appeared to have oversigned. When asked about the appearance of being oversigned during his Signing Day press conference, Saban gave a 431-word response in which he denied being oversigned but refused to clarify the situation by explaining how many scholarship players departed the program after the 2010 season. Further raising questions about Saban and Alabama, Birmingham News journalist Kevin Scarbinsky revealed a few days after Saban's press conference that in numerous requests by the newspaper for the scholarship numbers of public universities in Alabama, the University of Alabama has been the only one to completely redact the numbers for every sport in which it participates.

=== LSU and Les Miles ===
In 2010, Louisiana State University (LSU) and head coach Les Miles were also the subjects of numerous oversigning allegations. In August, with his program at the scholarship limit for the year, Miles asked two recruits, Elliot Porter and Cameron Fordham, to wait until January 2011 to receive their previously promised scholarships. (This practice is known as "grayshirting.") Fordham chose to stay with the team, but Porter decided to leave the school. A third player, Houston Bates, had previously been asked to grayshirt and decided not to attend LSU, instead signing with Illinois.

Porter joined the Kentucky football team that fall, but left during the season. He transferred back to LSU the next year but had to sit out the season due to transfer rules. Porter became the full-time starting center for LSU for the 2013 football season. Despite being trashed by the national media for downgrading Porter's scholarship offer to a grayshirt offer, Miles took Porter back with open arms.

In December, ESPN's Outside the Lines broadcast a report in which former LSU quarterback Chris Garrett claimed LSU and Les Miles lied about the circumstances surrounding the school's decision not to renew Garrett's scholarship and Garrett's subsequent departure from LSU.

=== South Carolina and Steve Spurrier ===
In 2011, South Carolina, coached by Steve Spurrier, oversigned by several players. Both Oversigning.com and Rivals.com estimated South Carolina oversigned by 6 players when it signed 32 players in its 2011 class. Additionally, on the day before National Signing Day, South Carolina rescinded offers to two other recruits that had verbally committed to signing with the school. One of the recruits, Lorenzo Mauldin, had been committed to the school for months but learned he would not receive a scholarship offer when South Carolina faxed a notice of the rescinded offer to his high school on the day before Signing Day. Walter Banks, the coach of Jordan Montgomery, the other recruit whose scholarship offer was pulled the day before National Signing Day, told The Wall Street Journal, "I told [South Carolina coaches] this was foul. I didn't have a clue until 18 hours before signing day, and if they say anything else, they're lying." Banks also told The State that South Carolina coaches are "no longer welcome" at his high school (South Lake High School in Groveland, Florida) saying, "I cannot look a kid and their parent in the face and say you can trust what a University of South Carolina coach says." Spurrier admitted to The Wall Street Journal that "what we probably could've done earlier in the recruiting is tell them that this could happen." He later added, "I think on [February 1] we alerted both of them, talked to them and said 'Hey, I'm sorry. This is where we are. We got all these other commitments.' We didn't like doing this." In late March 2011, Mauldin signed with Louisville saying that he came to believe that South Carolina coaches really didn't want him to qualify anyway.

=== 2011 rule change ===
In June 2011, the SEC presidents and chancellors unanimously passed a new conference rule that prohibits teams from signing more than 25 players to National Letter of Intent from December 1 through May 31. The league's coaches unanimously voted the day before to recommend maintaining the limit of 28.
