= 2011 European Athletics Junior Championships – Men's 100 metres =

The men's 100 metres at the 2011 European Athletics Junior Championships were held at the Kadrioru Stadium on 21 and 22 July.

== Medalists ==
| Gold | Jimmy Vicaut; France (FRA) |
| Silver | (United Kingdom) Adam Gemili; Great Britain (GBR) |
| Bronze | (United Kingdom) David Bolarinwa; Great Britain (GBR) |

== Records ==
Prior to the competition, the existing world junior and championship records were as follows.

| World Junior Record | Darrel Brown (TRI) | 10.01 | Paris, France | 24 August 2003 |
| World Junior Record | Jeff Demps (USA) | 10.01 | Eugene, United States | 28 June 2008 |
| Championship Record | Christophe Lemaitre (FRA) | 10.04 | Novi Sad, Serbia | 24 July 2009 |
| European Junior Record | Christophe Lemaitre (FRA) | 10.04 | Novi Sad, Serbia | 24 July 2009 |
| World Junior Leading | Prezel Hardy (USA) | 10.13 | Waco, United States | 23 April 2011 |
| European Junior Leading | Jimmy Vicaut (FRA) | 10.20 | Antony, France | 25 June 2011 |

Gold medalist Jimmy Vicaut established a new WJL with 10.07 sec in the final.

== Schedule ==
| Date | Time | Round |
|---|---|---|
| 21 July 2011 | 17:15 | Semifinals |
| 22 July 2011 | 17:10 | Final |

== Results ==
=== Heats ===
Qualification: First 2 in each heat (Q) and 2 best performers (q) advance to the Final.

Wind:
Heat 1: −1.8 m/s, Heat 2: −0.5 m/s, Heat 3: −0.7 m/s

| Rank | Heat | Name | Nationality | React | Time | Notes |
|---|---|---|---|---|---|---|
| 1 | 1 | Jimmy Vicaut | France | 0.148 | 10.12 | Q, WJL, PB |
| 2 | 3 | Adam Gemili | Great Britain | 0.186 | 10.49 | Q |
| 3 | 2 | David Bolarinwa | Great Britain | 0.166 | 10.55 | Q |
| 4 | 3 | Dario Horvat | Croatia | 0.166 | 10.57 | Q |
| 5 | 1 | Sam Watts | Great Britain | 0.173 | 10.66 | Q |
| 6 | 3 | André Biveti | Portugal | 0.180 | 10.69 | q |
| 7 | 1 | Giovanni Galbieri | Italy | 0.171 | 10.70 | q |
| 8 | 2 | Yiğitcan Hekimoglu | Turkey | 0.215 | 10.71 | Q |
| 8 | 3 | Kamil Supiński | Poland | 0.164 | 10.71 | |
| 10 | 2 | Ken Romain | France | 0.209 | 10.75 | |
| 10 | 3 | Dávid Ónodi | Hungary | 0.203 | 10.75 | |
| 12 | 2 | Odain Rose | Sweden | 0.216 | 10.80 | |
| 13 | 3 | Omri Harush | Israel | 0.166 | 10.81 | PB |
| 14 | 2 | Kostas Skrabulis | Lithuania | 0.143 | 10.84 | |
| 15 | 1 | David Alejandro | Spain | 0.172 | 10.89 | |
| 16 | 3 | Vladimir Jean Bart | France | 0.163 | 10.91 | |
| 17 | 2 | Mateusz Kołodziej | Poland | 0.171 | 10.94 | |
| 18 | 1 | Diogo Antunes | Portugal | 0.167 | 10.98 | |
| 19 | 3 | Sebastiano Spotti | Italy | 0.178 | 10.93 | |
| 20 | 2 | Tiziano Proietti | Italy | 0.194 | 11.03 | |
| 21 | 1 | Andrew Cavilla | Gibraltar | 0.230 | 11.75 | PB |
| | 1 | Rasmus Rooks | Estonia | 0.180 | DNF | |

=== Final ===
Wind: +0.3 m/s

| Rank | Lane | Name | Nationality | React | Time | Notes |
|---|---|---|---|---|---|---|
| 1st place, gold medalist(s) | 4 | Jimmy Vicaut | France | 0.164 | 10.07 | WJL, PB |
| 2nd place, silver medalist(s) | 3 | Adam Gemili | Great Britain | 0.182 | 10.41 | |
| 3rd place, bronze medalist(s) | 6 | David Bolarinwa | Great Britain | 0.153 | 10.46 | |
| 4 | 5 | Dario Horvat | Croatia | 0.173 | 10.49 | |
| 5 | 8 | Sam Watts | Great Britain | 0.176 | 10.61 | |
| 6 | 1 | André Biveti | Portugal | 0.187 | 10.62 | PB |
| 7 | 2 | Giovanni Galbieri | Italy | 0.195 | 10.65 | |
| 8 | 7 | Yiğitcan Hekimoglu | Turkey | 0.200 | 10.80 | |
