= Danny Talbot =

British sprinter (born 1991)

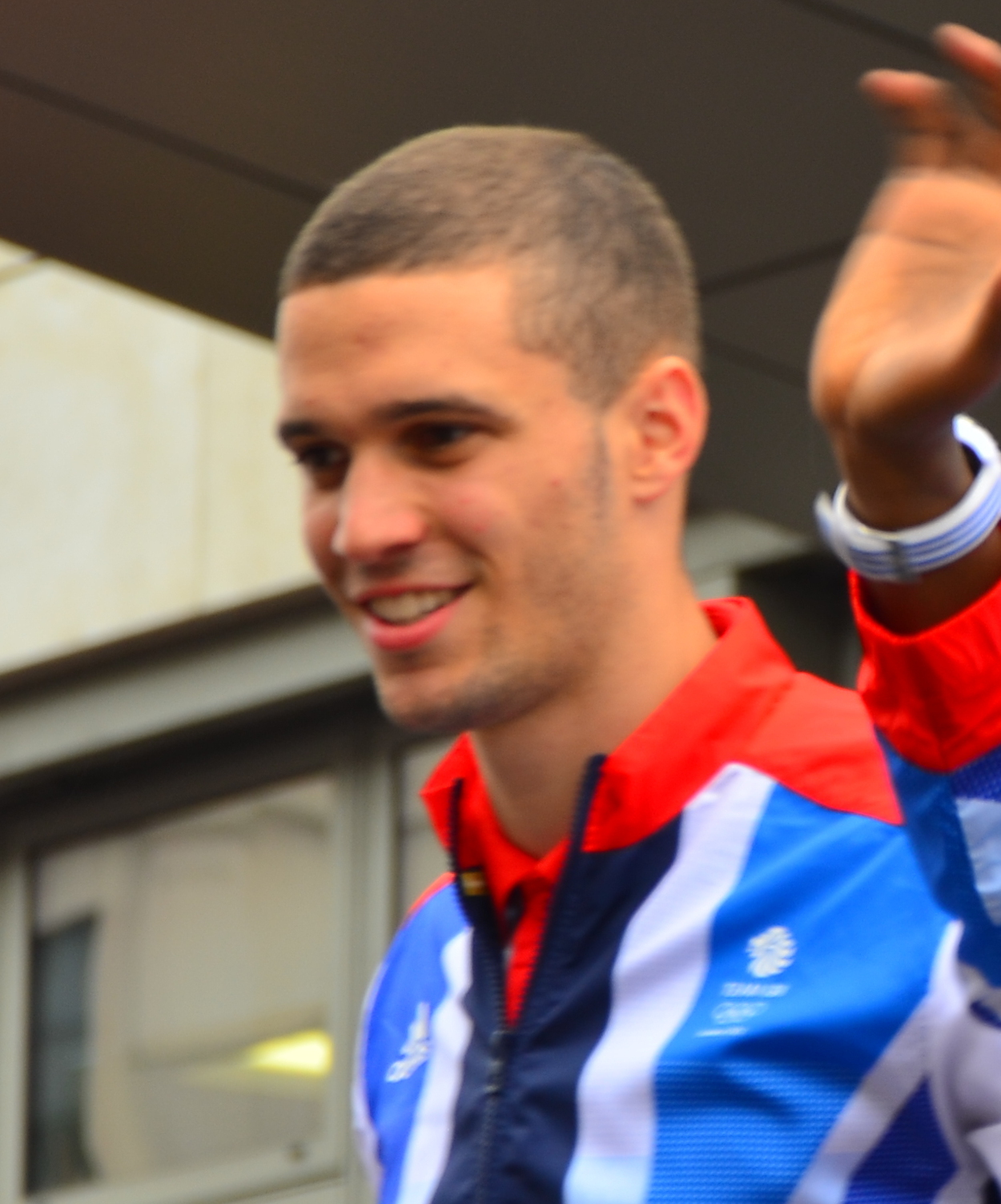

Personal information
- Nationality: British (English)
- Born: 1 May 1991 (age 35) Trowbridge, England
- Height: 1.84 m (6 ft 0 in)
- Weight: 69 kg (152 lb)

Sport
- Sport: Athletics
- Event: Sprints
- Club: Birchfield Harriers 100 m: 10.14 (Bedford 2014) 200 m: 20.16 (London 2017)
Medal record
Men's Athletics
Representing Great Britain
World Championships
| Gold medal – first place | 2017 London | 4 × 100 m relay |
European Championships
| Gold medal – first place | 2014 Zürich | 4 × 100 m relay |
| Bronze medal – third place | 2012 Helsinki | 200 m |
| Bronze medal – third place | 2016 Amsterdam | 200 m |
European U23 Championships
| Silver medal – second place | 2011 Ostrava | 4 × 100 m relay |
| Silver medal – second place | 2013 Tampere | 200 m |
Representing England
Commonwealth Games
| Silver medal – second place | 2014 Glasgow | 4 × 100 m relay |

Danny Talbot (born 1 May 1991) is a retired British sprinter who specialised in the 100 metres and the 200 metres. He competed at the 2012 Summer Olympics and the 2016 Summer Olympics.

== Biography ==
Talbot was born in Trowbridge, England, to a British father and a mother who is half Trinidadian. Talbot was educated at St Augustine's Catholic College in Trowbridge, Wiltshire.

Talbot won the 200 m bronze medal at the 2012 European Athletics Championships in Helsinki. For Team GB in the 4 × 100 m at the London 2012 Olympics, he ran the third leg in the heats but failed to exchange the baton with anchor Adam Gemili. He ran again for Britain in the 4 × 100 at the 2014 World Relay Championships, forming part of a quartet which ran 37.93 in the heats and went on to win bronze.

Talbot became the British 200 metres champion after winning the 2014 British Athletics Championships. Later that year he represented England at the 2014 Commonwealth Games in Glasgow, and won a silver medal in the relay event.

At the IAAF World Championships held in London in 2017, Talbot qualified for the 200 metres semifinal with a personal best of 20.16 in his heat on 7 August. Five days later he ran the third leg for the 4 × 100 metres relay team which won the gold medal in a time of 37.47, a British and European record.

Talbot retired from athletics competitions in December 2021.

== Competition record ==
| Year | Competition | Venue | Position | Event | Notes |
Representing Great Britain
| 2010 | World Junior Championships | Moncton, New Brunswick, Canada | 14th (sf) | 200 m | 21.19 w (+2.1 m/s) |
| 2010 | World Junior Championships | Moncton, New Brunswick, Canada | — | 4 × 100 m relay | DNF |
| 2011 | European U23 Championships | Ostrava, Czech Republic | 4th | 200 m | 20.71 |
| 2011 | European U23 Championships | Ostrava, Czech Republic | 2nd | 4 × 100 m relay | 39.10 |
| 2012 | European Championships | Helsinki, Finland | 3rd | 200 m | 20.95 |
| 2013 | European U23 Championships | Tampere, Finland | 2nd | 200 m | 20.46 (-0.3 m/s) |
| 2013 | European U23 Championships | Tampere, Finland | 1st | 4 × 100 m relay | 38.77 |
| 2015 | World Championships | Beijing, China | 13th (h) | 200 m | 20.27 |
| 2015 | World Championships | Beijing, China | — | 4 × 100 m relay | DNF |
| 2016 | European Championships | Amsterdam, Netherlands | 3rd | 200 m | 20.56 |
| 2016 | Olympic Games | Rio de Janeiro, Brazil | 11th (sf) | 200 m | 20.25 |
| 2017 | IAAF World Relays | Nassau, Bahamas | 3rd (h) | 4 × 100 m relay | 38.32^{1} |
| 2017 | World Championships | London, United Kingdom | 9th (sf) | 200 m | 20.38 |
| 2017 | World Championships | London, United Kingdom | 1st | 4 × 100 m relay | 37.47 |

^{1}Did not finish in the final
