= Jan Jirka =

Czech sprinter (born 1993)

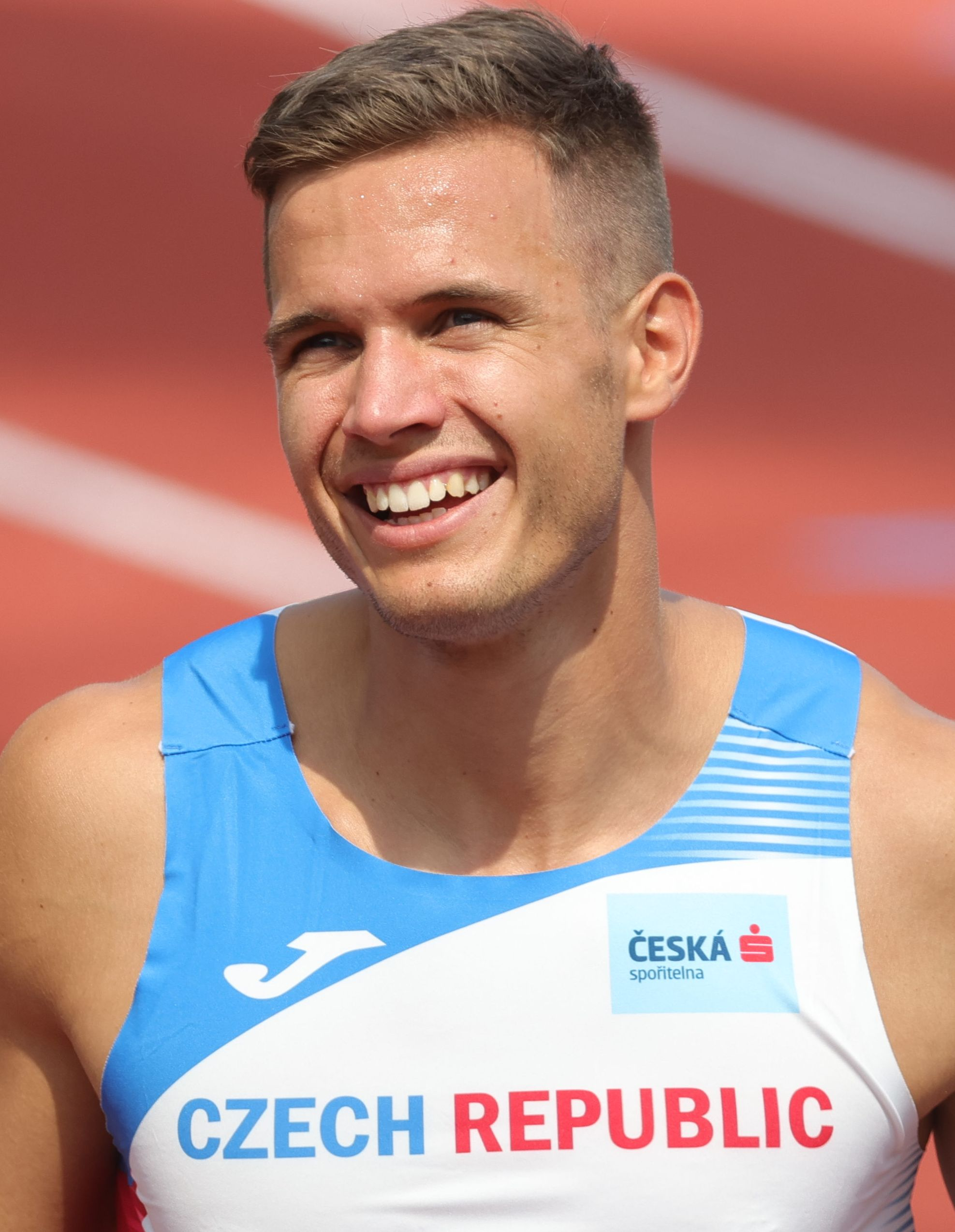
- Jirka in 2022

Personal information
- Born: 5 October 1993 (age 32) Brandýs nad Labem-Stará Boleslav, Czech Republic

Sport
- Sport: Athletics
- Event: 200 metres

Jan Jirka (born 5 October 1993) is a Czech sprinter competing primarily in the 200 metres. He won a bronze medal at the 2015 European U23 Championships.

== International competitions ==
Year	Competition	Venue	Position	Event	Notes
Representing the Czech Republic
2012	World Junior Championships	Barcelona, Spain	33rd (h)	200 m	21.50
2012	World Junior Championships	Barcelona, Spain	–	4 × 100 m relay	DQ
2013	European U23 Championships	Tampere, Finland	11th (h)	200 m	21.15
2013	European U23 Championships	Tampere, Finland	5th	4 × 100 m relay	39.23
2015	European U23 Championships	Tallinn, Estonia	3rd	200 m	20.82
2015	European U23 Championships	Tallinn, Estonia	2nd	4 × 100 m relay	39.38
2018	European Championships	Berlin, Germany	21st (h)	200 m	21.15
2018	European Championships	Berlin, Germany	6th (h)	4 × 100 m relay	38.94^{1}
2019	World Relays	Yokohama, Japan	12th (h)	4 × 100 m relay	38.77
2021	World Relays	Chorzów, Poland	–	4 × 100 m relay	DNF
2021	Olympic Games	Tokyo, Japan	–	200 m	DQ
2022	World Championships	Eugene, United States	35th (h)	200 m	20.73
2022	European Championships	Munich, Germany	17th (sf)	200 m	20.80
2022	European Championships	Munich, Germany	13th (h)	4 × 100 m relay	39.41
2024	European Championships	Rome, Italy	11th (h)	4 × 100 m relay	39.22

^{1}Did not start in the final

== Personal bests ==
Outdoor

- 100 metres – 10.51 (+1.3 m/s, Prague 2017)
- 200 metres – 20.75 (+1.4 m/s, Kladno 2018)

Indoor

- 60 metres – 6.99 (Prague 2013)
- 200 metres – 20.85 (Prague 2015)
