= Teray Smith =

Bahamian sprinter

Personal information
- Nationality: Bahamian
- Born: 28 September 1994 (age 31) Freeport, Bahamas
- Education: Auburn University
- Height: 6 ft 2 in (188 cm)

Sport
- Sport: Running
- Event: Sprints
- College team: Auburn Tigers
- Coached by: Ralph Spry

Achievements and titles
- Personal bests: 100 m: 10.32 (Nassau 2014); 200 m: 20.25 (Lexington, Kentucky 2017)
Medal record
Men's athletics
Representing the Bahamas
Commonwealth Games
| Silver medal – second place | 2018 Gold Coast | 4 × 400 m relay |
NACAC Championships
| Silver medal – second place | 2018 Toronto | 4x400m relay |
CAC Junior Championships (Junior)
| Gold medal – first place | 2012 San Salvador | 100 m |
| Silver medal – second place | 2012 San Salvador | 4×100 m relay |
CARIFTA Games (Junior)
| Gold medal – first place | 2012 Hamilton | 4×100 m relay |
| Gold medal – first place | 2013 Nassau | 200 m |
| Bronze medal – third place | 2012 Hamilton | 200 m |

Teray Smith (born 28 September 1994) is a Bahamian sprinter.

He attended American Heritage School in Plantation, Florida, for his junior and senior year, after transferring from Everglades High School in Miramar.

Smith won a bronze medal in the 100 metres at the 2012 CARIFTA Games in Hamilton, Bermuda & a gold medal at the 2013 CARIFTA Games in Nassau, Bahamas.

Smith is the nephew of Henry Rolle. Rolle recruited Smith to Auburn University before going on to professionally coach him as part of the MVP International in Boca Raton, Florida.

== Competition record ==
| Year | Competition | Venue | Position | Event | Notes |
Representing the Bahamas
| 2012 | CARIFTA Games (U20) | Hamilton, Bermuda | 3rd | 200 m | 21.18 |
| 2012 | CARIFTA Games (U20) | Hamilton, Bermuda | 1st | 4 × 100 m relay | 40.42 |
| 2012 | Central American and Caribbean; Junior Championships (U20) | San Salvador, El Salvador | 1st | 100 m | 10.58 |
| 2012 | Central American and Caribbean; Junior Championships (U20) | San Salvador, El Salvador | 4th (h) | 200 m | 21.44 (w)^{1} |
| 2012 | Central American and Caribbean; Junior Championships (U20) | San Salvador, El Salvador | 2nd | 4 × 100 m relay | 39.80 |
| 2012 | World Junior Championships | Barcelona, Spain | 8th (sf) | 100 m | 10.44 |
| 2012 | World Junior Championships | Barcelona, Spain | 7th | 200 m | 20.99 |
| 2012 | World Junior Championships | Barcelona, Spain | 6th | 4 × 100 m relay | 39.74 |
| 2013 | CARIFTA Games (U20) | Nassau, Bahamas | 6th | 200 m | 10.60 |
| 2013 | CARIFTA Games (U20) | Nassau, Bahamas | 1st | 200 m | 20.58 (w) |
| 2014 | Commonwealth Games | Glasgow, United Kingdom | 22nd (sf) | 200 m | 21.13 |
| 2014 | Commonwealth Games | Glasgow, United Kingdom | 5th | 4 × 100 m relay | 39.16 |
| 2015 | Pan American Games | Toronto, Canada | 10th (h) | 4 × 100 m relay | 39.53 |
| 2015 | NACAC Championships | San José, Costa Rica | 6th | 200 m | 20.66 |
| 2015 | NACAC Championships | San José, Costa Rica | 8th | 4 × 100 m relay | 40.33 |
| 2015 | World Championships | Beijing, China | 43rd (h) | 200 m | 20.91 |
| 2015 | World Championships | Beijing, China | 12th (h) | 4 × 100 m relay | 38.96 |
| 2016 | Olympic Games | Rio de Janeiro, Brazil | 52nd (h) | 200 m | 20.66 |
| 2017 | World Championships | London, United Kingdom | 34th (h) | 200 m | 20.77 |
| 2017 | World Championships | London, United Kingdom | — | 4 × 100 m relay | DQ |
| 2018 | Commonwealth Games | Gold Coast, Australia | 11th (sf) | 200 m | 20.71 |
| 2018 | Commonwealth Games | Gold Coast, Australia | 2nd | 4 × 400 m relay | 3:01.92 |
| 2018 | NACAC Championships | Toronto, Canada | 9th (h) | 200 m | 20.90 |
| 2018 | NACAC Championships | Toronto, Canada | 2nd | 4 × 400 m relay | 3:03.80 |

^{1}Did not start in the final
