= College recruiting =

Entry process for US college athletes

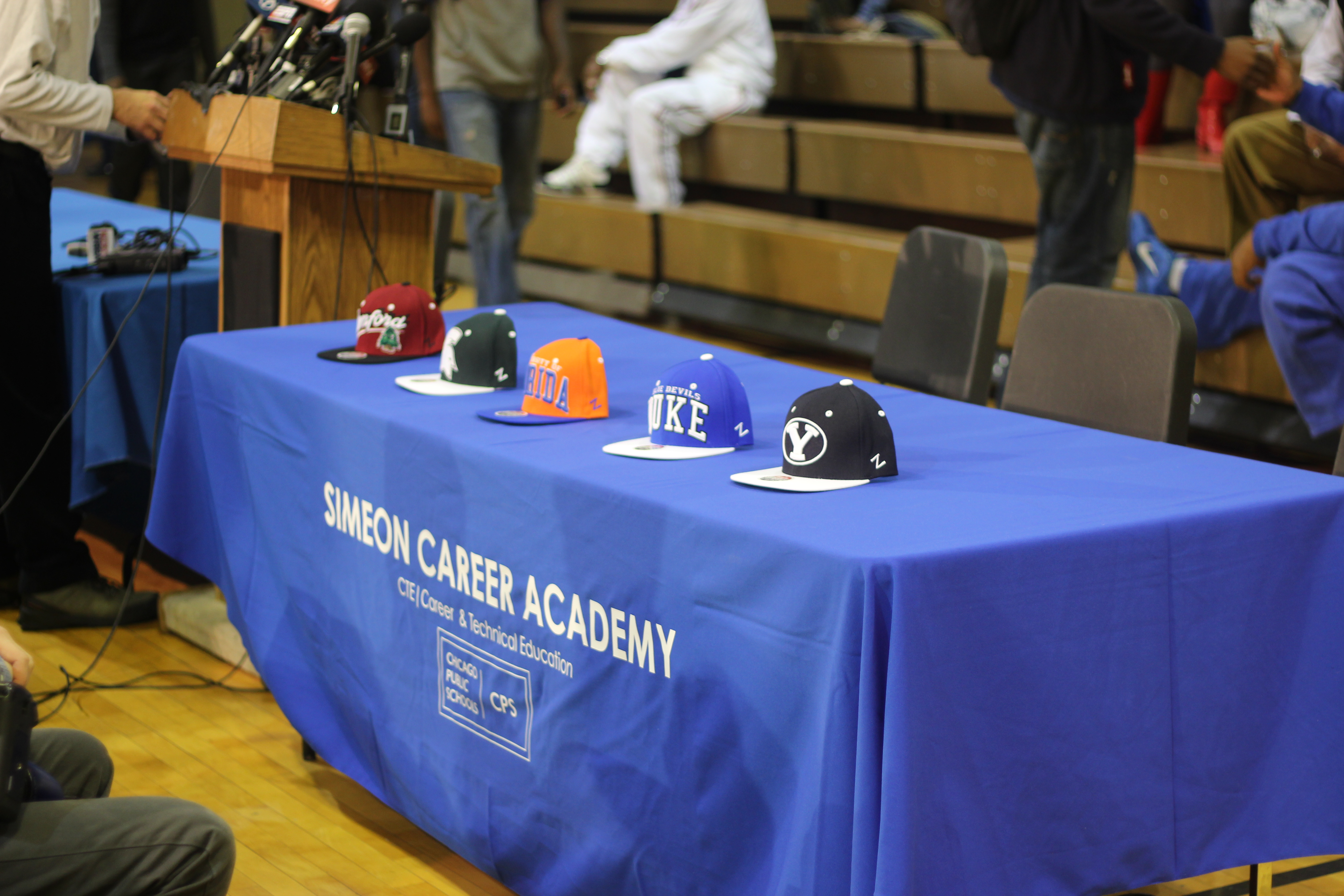
Blue chip athletes often end recruiting with a hat selection ceremony in which they make a verbal commitment.

In college athletics in the United States, recruiting is the process in which college coaches add prospective student athletes to their roster each off-season. This process typically culminates in a coach extending an athletic scholarship offer to a player who is about to be a junior in high school or higher. There are instances, mostly at lower division universities, where no athletic scholarship can be awarded and where the player pays for tuition, housing, and textbook costs out of pocket or from financial aid. During this recruiting process, schools must comply with rules that define who may be involved in the recruiting process, when recruiting may occur and the conditions under which recruiting may be conducted. Recruiting rules seek, as much as possible, to control intrusions into the lives of prospective student-athletes. The NCAA defines recruiting as “any solicitation of prospective student-athletes or their parents by an institutional staff member or by a representative of the institution’s athletics interests for the purpose of securing a prospective student-athlete’s enrollment and ultimate participation in the institution’s intercollegiate athletics program."

== General process ==
To be considered a “recruited prospective student-athlete”, athletes must be approached by a college coach or representative about participating in that college's athletic program. NCAA guidelines specify how and when they can be contacted. Letters, telephone calls, and in-person conversations are limited to certain frequency and dates during and after the student's junior year. The NCAA also determines when the athletes can be contacted by dividing the year into four recruiting and non-recruiting periods:

1. During a contact period, recruiters may make in-person, on- or off-campus contacts and evaluations. Coaches can also write and/or phone athletes during this period.

2. During an evaluation period, they can only assess academic qualifications and playing abilities. Letters and phone calls are permitted; in-person, off-campus recruiting contacts are not permitted.

3. During a quiet period, they may make in-person recruiting contacts only on the college campus. Off-campus, recruiters are limited to phone calls and letter-writing.

4. During a dead period, they cannot make in-person recruiting contacts or evaluations on- or off-campus or permit official/unofficial visits. However, phone calls and letters are permitted.

During the recruiting process, the prospective student-athlete goes on an official visit to the school that they're being recruited by. An official visit is a prospective student-athlete's visit to a college campus paid for by the college. The college can pay for transportation to and from the college, room, and meals (three per day) while visiting and reasonable entertainment expenses, including three complimentary admissions to a home athletics contest. NCAA recruiting bylaws limit the number of official visits a recruit may take to five. The NCAA has imposed stringent rules limiting the manner in which competing university-firms may bid for the newest crop of prospective student-athletes. Such rules limit the number of visits that a student-athlete may make to a given campus, the amount of his expenses that may be covered by the university-firm, and so forth.

== National Letter of Intent ==
During recruitment, a college coach may ask a prospective player to sign a National Letter of Intent or NLI for short. The NLI is a voluntary program with regard to both institutions and student-athletes. No prospective student-athlete or parent is required to sign the NLI, and no institution is required to join the program. By signing a NLI, a prospective student-athlete agrees to attend the designated college or university for one academic year. Pursuant to the terms of the NLI program, participating institutions agree to provide athletics financial aid to the student-athlete, provided he/she is admitted to the institution and eligible for financial aid under NCAA rules. An important provision of this program serves as a recruiting prohibition applied after a prospective student-athlete signs an NLI. This prohibition requires participating institutions to cease recruitment of a prospective student-athlete once an NLI is signed with another institution. The NLI has many advantages to both prospective student-athletes and participating educational institutions:

(A) Once a NLI is signed, prospective student-athletes are no longer subject to further recruiting contacts and calls.

(B) Student-athletes are assured of an athletics scholarship for a minimum of one full academic year.

(C) By emphasizing a commitment to an educational institution, not particular coaches or teams, the program focuses on a prospective student-athlete's educational objectives.

In professional sports, the services of athletes are secured via an exclusive contract with an organization. By comparison, the services of many college athletes are secured through recruiting services established by the athletic departments which include staff members and influential friends of the institutions. The college athlete normally signs an exclusive contract, such as the NLI, at the expense of losing a year's eligibility if he chooses to transfer to another institution of his choosing. The NLI program is subscribed to by all major athletic conferences and nearly all-independent universities. NCAA Division I is likely to create its own NLI for each sport and, in addition, designate a different signing date for each sport in order to reduce the time and expense incurred when the recruiting season is overly long.

== Intercollegiate athletics ==
Recruiting top student-athletes is even more strategic due to the potential increase in undergraduate admissions and booster donations that a championship may bring. Traditionally, coaches recruiting for major college athletic departments focused on highlighting the athletic accomplishments of the athletic program. Clotfelter writes about the problems of college sports. Although, he says there are benefits to universities in playing big-time sports, which he defines as Division I basketball and schools in the Football Bowl Subdivision. Those benefits go beyond money and can be difficult to measure. The transformation of college athletics over the past 30 years into a multibillion-dollar, internationally recognized business has changed the focus of intercollegiate athletic departments. Budget minded administrators have realized that a winning team can provide an effective means of advertising their institutions and securing much needed additional funding. In order to ensure the cycle of successful seasons, it is imperative that the athletic department recruits the most athletically talented and academically eligible potential student-athletes possible.

Since success or failure in recruiting is seen as a precursor of a team's future prospects, many college sports fans follow it as closely as the team's actual games and it also provides a way to be connected to the team during the off season. Fans' desire for information has spawned a million-dollar industry which first developed extensively during the 1980s. Prior to the internet, popular recruiting services used newsletters and pay telephone numbers to disseminate information. Since the mid-1990s, many online recruiting websites have offered fans player profiles, scouting videos, player photos, statistics, interviews, and other information, including rankings of both a player and a team's recruiting class. Most of these websites charge for their information.

== College football ==
In the United States, the most widely followed recruiting cycle is that of college football. This is due in part to the large following football usually has at most universities in Division I, especially those in the top-level Football Bowl Subdivision (FBS). Division I FBS football also has the highest number of scholarship players of any college sport, with 85. The NCAA allows football teams to add up to 25 new scholarship players to the roster per academic year, so long as the total number of scholarship players does not exceed 85.

For teams in the second-tier Division I FCS, scholarships are limited to an amount equal to 63 full scholarships. However, FCS schools are allowed to award partial scholarships, as long as the total number of "counters" (NCAA terminology for a person who counts against limits on players receiving financial aid for that sport) is no greater than 85. Effective with the 2017–18 recruiting cycle, FCS teams are free to award financial aid to any number of new players in a given year, as long as the overall team limits are met; previously, the annual limit on "counters" had been 30.

In Division II, schools are limited to an amount equal to 36 full scholarships. This can be limited due to lack of funding for a schools program.

The football recruiting season typically begins as soon as the previous year's class has signed — though the building of relationships between college coaches and high school players and their coaches may have been going on for months or years before that. Each summer, high school players attend various football camps at nearby college campuses to be evaluated on measures of athleticism, such as the 40-yard dash, vertical jump, agility shuttle; and the number of repetitions of the bench press that an athlete can perform at a given weight, usually 185 pounds unlike at the NFL combine where they use 225 pounds. Recently, the SPARQ rating has become a popular composite metric of a high school football player's athleticism. At this time of year, based on game film and performance at combines, this is typically when players begin to receive most scholarship offers.

After receiving an offer, a player may choose to commit. This is a non-binding, oral agreement. Although more coaches have tried in recent years to get players to commit early, many athletes, especially highly rated prospects, often commit within a month of National Signing Day, the day all high school players who will graduate that year can sign letters of intent (LI) to play for the college of their choice. Signing Day always falls on the first Wednesday of February. Other players, who may not have as many offers to choose from, more often verbally commit earlier in the process. Players occasionally decide to sign with a different school from which they gave a verbal commitment, which often leads to rancor between the fans and coaching staffs of the two schools. Junior college players, however, can sign scholarships in late-December, once their sophomore seasons have ended.

A letter of intent is binding for both the player and school for one academic year as long as the player is eligible to enroll at the college.

In April 2017, the NCAA Division I Council approved a piece of legislation that significantly changed the FBS recruiting landscape.

- Effective with the 2017–18 school year, an early signing period for high school players, to take place in December, was added for the first time. This particular item required the approval of the Collegiate Commissioners Association, which came on May 8. The CCA fixed the early signing period as the first three days of the previously existing midyear signing window for junior college players.
- The current limit of 25 new scholarships (or financial aid agreements) per academic year became an absolute limit, eliminating the oversigning phenomenon. The most significant exceptions are for walk-ons who have been on the roster for at least two years, plus current players or recruits who suffer incapacitating injuries.
- A new period for official visits, running from April 1 of the recruit's junior year to the Sunday before the last Wednesday in June in the same calendar year, was introduced. This particular change did not take effect until April 1, 2018, meaning that the first recruits able to take advantage of this period were those signing for the 2019 season.
- FBS programs are prohibited from hiring designated individuals close to a recruit (such as parents or guardians) during a four-year window centered on the recruit's anticipated (and actual) enrollment at the school, unless they are hired as full-time members of the team's coaching staff. This mirrors a rule that has been in place in D-I men's basketball since 2010.
- FBS coaches, as well as any staff members at FBS schools with football-specific responsibilities, are allowed to participate in clinics and camps only for 10 days in June and July, and only if they take place at that school's campus or at an off-campus facility the school regularly uses for practices or games.

== College basketball ==
Recruiting for Division I basketball teams is also closely followed by fans. Schools are limited to having 13 scholarship players in men's basketball and 15 in women's basketball. The formal NCAA rules and processes for recruiting and signing recruits are similar, but the identification and recruiting of talent differs from football in important ways. Whereas football players can only play in a very limited number of competitive games per year, summer camps and traveling AAU teams afford prospects the opportunity to play outside of the regular basketball season. As a result, while football players generally only come to the attention of college recruiters after excelling at the high school varsity level, top level basketball players may emerge as early as the 8th or 9th grade. Players may also consider their AAU team as their primary squad, which can make high school basketball coaches less influential in the recruiting process than high school football coaches.

Another key difference in the recruiting cycle for college basketball, as opposed to that of football (prior to 2017–18), is the time of signing:

- First, basketball, along with most NCAA sports, has two signing periods during which all athletes are allowed to sign letters of intent—one in the fall (autumn) and the other in the spring. The early signing period starts on the second Wednesday of November and runs through the third Wednesday of that month. Before 2017–18, football's early signing period (between December and January) was restricted to junior-college transfers.
- The regular signing period in basketball does not start until the third Wednesday of April, after high schools throughout the U.S. have completed their basketball seasons.

== Terminology ==
- Oversigning - is an unofficial term for the practice of American college athletic departments signing recruits to a National Letter of Intent (NLI) that may exceed the maximum number of athletic scholarships permitted by the National Collegiate Athletic Association (NCAA). The NCAA limits the total number of scholarships that may be awarded in all sports; in football, it also limits the number of scholarships awarded in a given year.
- Evaluation period - When a college coach watches a student play the sport they are recruiting for or visits the high school, but they can not have any contact with the student or the parents outside of the college campus.
- Quiet period - is a time when the college may not have any in-person talk with the prospective student-athlete or the parents off the college's campus. The coach may not watch the prospect play or practice. The prospective student-athlete can visit college campuses during this time and a coach may write or telephone.
- Dead period - The coach can not have any in person contact with the student or the student's parents, but they can call or write the student or student's parents.
- Contact - occurs any time a coach has any face-to-face contact with a prospective student-athlete or the prospect's parents off the college's campus and says more than hello. A contact also occurs if a coach has any contact with the prospective student-athlete or their parents at the prospective student-athlete's high school or any location where the prospect is engaging in competition or practice.
- Blue chip - A term referring to student athletes that are considered to be among the top players (overall or at their position) coming out of high school.
- Yellow chip - The term used for athletes who are good enough to make a college team, but aren't blue chips.
- Early enrollment - Enrollment of student athletes to a university during the 2nd semester or 3rd quarter of the academic calendar year that runs concurrent with their final high school calendar year. The student athlete must have completed the secondary education requirements needed to receive their diploma, have graduated, met minimum standards for admission and been qualified according to the NCAA clearing house.
- Grayshirting - The practice of delaying enrollment of a student athlete until 2nd semester/quarter or 3rd quarter of the academic year following signing of a National Letter of Intent (NLI). Student athletes may be asked to delay enrollment or choose to do so voluntarily for various reasons. If a student athlete is asked to delay entry but chooses not to, that can have their NLI voided and immediately sign with another school without penalty. If a student athlete chooses to grayshirt then they may either be counted toward scholarship limitation for the current signing period or for the signing period of the following year.
- Silent commitment - A player has committed to play for a school but has not publicly disclosed this yet.
- Verbal commitment - A player has publicly announced a commitment, but has not yet signed the NLI (or a financial aid agreement). Often referred to simply as a "verbal".
- Project/Sleeper/Under the Radar- Terms that refer to a recruit who is not as highly ranked as a school's typical recruits. Often, these are players who may be athletically gifted but who may have begun playing the sport recently, but the coaches believe they may develop into contributing players with more experience. The term can also refer to a recruit who is playing "out of position" in high school—that is, playing at a position for which he may not best be suited in the long term. Sometimes, a player may be limited by his high school system, such as a quarterback with potential as a passer who is playing at a school with a ground-oriented offense. Such a player may also have been hampered by injuries during high school. Schools often recruit such players if they have scholarships left over at the end of a recruiting period.
- One-and-done – A player likely to declare for a professional draft after one season. While this term can be used in an ice hockey context due to NHL entry draft eligibility rules, it is most commonly associated with men's basketball, since current NBA draft rules prevent players from declaring for the draft until one year after high school graduation. Rules in other significant drafts prevent one-and-dones—women's basketball players are not eligible for the WNBA draft until four years after their high school class has graduated, and the NFL and MLB have three-year restrictions.
- Blow up – Verb used to describe the sudden development of a previously ignored player into a top prospect. Can be used in any sport, but most often connected with basketball.
- Athlete - This term mostly applies to American football recruiting. This is typically a student athlete with the skills and physical attributes that would allow them to play numerous positions on the team.
- Recruited Walk-On - Student athletes that are invited to join a program but are not offered athletically related financial aid or scholarship. In football, place kickers, punters, and long snappers frequently join teams as recruited walk-ons. Walk-ons may be awarded a scholarship at any time. Once a player is awarded a scholarship, that athlete counts against the scholarship limitations for the duration of the time the student athlete is on scholarship. While many walk-on athletes, particularly in football, are recruited, others may approach the coaches without invitation about joining the team. In some cases, programs may hold open try-outs to find players among the student body.
- All-American - Term used to describe the top athletes in a particular spot. There are two types of All-Americans, academic and athletic.
- Official visit - Any visit to the college by the student that is completely paid for by the college.

=== Star ratings ===
Most recruiting services classify recruits by a number of "stars" with a higher number for more highly ranked prospects. Most services use 5 stars for the highest ranked recruits and only a few players at each position attain this rank. 4 stars is a typical ranking for most recruits at schools which regularly finish as one of the top ranked teams in a particular sport. 3 stars is a typical ranking for recruits at most other schools in "Power Four" football conferences as well as the top schools from the "Group of Six conferences". 2 stars is a typical ranking for recruits at most mid-major level or Division I FCS schools. No major recruiting service currently issues ratings below 2 stars; unrated players typically play at levels below NCAA Division I or may be walk-ons at Division I schools.
