= Adam Gemili =

British sprinter (born 1993)

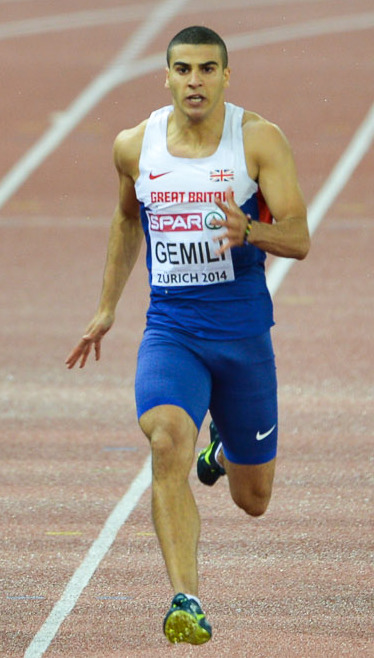
- Gemili at the 2014 European Athletics Championships in Zürich

Personal information
- Full name: Adam Ahmed Gemili
- Born: 6 October 1993 (age 33) London, England
- Height: 1.78 m (5 ft 10 in)
- Weight: 75 kg (165 lb)
- Website: adamgemili.com

Sport
- Country: Great Britain & N.I. England
- Sport: Athletics
- Event: Sprinting
- Retired: 2026

Achievements and titles
- Personal bests: 100 m: 9.97 (Birmingham 2015); 200 m: 19.97 (Brussels 2016)
Medal record
Men's athletics
Representing Great Britain
World Championships
Gold medal – first place	2017 London	4 × 100 m relay
Silver medal – second place	2019 Doha	4 × 100 m relay
Bronze medal – third place	2022 Eugene	4 × 100 m relay
European Championships
Gold medal – first place	2014 Zürich	200 m
Gold medal – first place	2014 Zürich	4 × 100 m relay
Gold medal – first place	2016 Amsterdam	4 × 100 m relay
Gold medal – first place	2018 Berlin	4 × 100 m relay
European Under 23 Championships
Gold medal – first place	2013 Tampere	100 m
Gold medal – first place	2013 Tampere	4 × 100 m relay
World Junior Championships
Gold medal – first place	2012 Barcelona	100 m
European Junior Championships
Silver medal – second place	2011 Tallinn	100 m
Silver medal – second place	2011 Tallinn	4 × 100 m relay
Representing England
Commonwealth Games
Silver medal – second place	2014 Glasgow	100 m
Silver medal – second place	2014 Glasgow	4 × 100 m relay
Association football career
- Positions: Centre-back; right-back
Team information
- Current team: Chelsea (sprint coach)
Youth career
- 2001–2008: Chelsea
- 2008–2009: Reading
Senior career*
Years	Team	Apps	(Gls)
2010–2012	Dagenham & Redbridge	0	(0)
2011	→ Thurrock (loan)	12	(0)
- * Club domestic league appearances and goals

Adam Ahmed Gemili (born 6 October 1993) is a British retired sprinter who was active from 2010 to 2026, and competing at the elite level between 2012 and 2023. He is the 2014 European champion at 200 metres, three-time European champion in the 4 × 100 metres relay, and part of the Great Britain team that won gold at the 2017 World Championships in the same event. individually, at global level he finished fourth in the 200 m at the 2016 Rio Olympic Games, and fourth and fifth in separate editions of the World Championships in the same event. A former professional player who played as a defender, Gemili announced his return to football as a coach after his retirement from elite athletics in 2026. He is a sprint coach at Premier League club Chelsea.

Gemili was the first British athlete, and the first sprinter of either North African or Middle Eastern descent, to run both the 100 m in less than 10 seconds and the 200 m in less than 20 seconds. He is also the first sprinter of either North African or Middle Eastern descent to break the 10-second barrier in the 100 metres.

A silver medalist in the 100 metres and 4 × 100 m relay for England in the 2014 Commonwealth Games, Gemili is also a former World Junior champion at 100 m and European Under-23 champion at 100 m and 4 × 100 m relay. He is a three-time national champion in the 200 m.

== Early life and background ==
Gemili's mother was born in Iran, his father is a Moroccan who moved to Britain in his late teens. At the age of eleven, he attended Dartford Grammar School. Gemili also attended Barking and Dagenham College where he studied for a BTEC Extended Diploma in Sport, and hoped to attend university at some point. After the 2012 Olympics he started studying Sports and Exercise Science with Human Biology at the University of East London, where he wrote his dissertation on the effect of particular warm-up exercises on sprinting performance.

Gemili is a member of Blackheath and Bromley Harriers Athletic Club, and also a former football player for Dagenham & Redbridge and Thurrock F.C. having spent seven years in the youth academy at Chelsea.

== Sprinting career ==
=== 2011–15 ===
Gemili won a silver medal over 100 m at the 2011 European Athletics Junior Championships in Tallinn, Estonia. He also helped the British squad to a silver medal in the 4 × 100 m relay. At the National Junior Athletic League Finals, Gemili won the 200 m in 20.98 s, which was the fastest time by a European junior in 2011.

Gemili ran an Olympic qualifying time for the 100 m and won the Sparkassen Gala in Regensburg, Germany on 2 June 2012, just over three weeks prior to the British track trials for the 2012 London Olympics. He beat his previous best time of 10.23 s in the heats, running a time of 10.11 s and then ran a time of 10.08 s in the final. That mark was the second fastest 100 m ever run by a British junior, behind only Dwain Chambers (10.06 s). At the time of his victory, James Dasaolu was the only one other British athlete to have met the Olympic qualifying time for the men's 100 m. Gemili was selected for the British 2012 Olympic 4 × 100 m relay team on 3 July 2012.

On 11 July 2012, Gemili finished first in the 100 m at the 2012 World Junior Championships in Athletics, winning the gold medal in a time of 10.05 seconds, breaking the championship record originally established by Darrel Brown in 2002. Besides breaking the British national junior record, Gemili's time ranked second among European juniors (behind Christophe Lemaitre's 10.04 s) and sixth all-time among all juniors, behind only Brown, Jeffery Demps, Marcus Rowland, D'Angelo Cherry and Lemaitre.

Gemili competed at the 2012 London Olympics where he, after a poor start, came third in the semi-final in a time of 10.06 s, 0.04 s short of qualifying for the final.

He qualified to run the 200 m at the 2013 World Championships in Athletics in Moscow. Having set a personal best in the first round, in the semi-final Gemili ran a time of 19.98 s, making him only the second British athlete, after John Regis, the third teenager (after Usain Bolt and Alonso Edward), and the ninth European athlete, to break 20 seconds in the event. 2013 was his first season training for the event. He thus qualified for his first major final where he finished fifth with a time of 20.08 s.

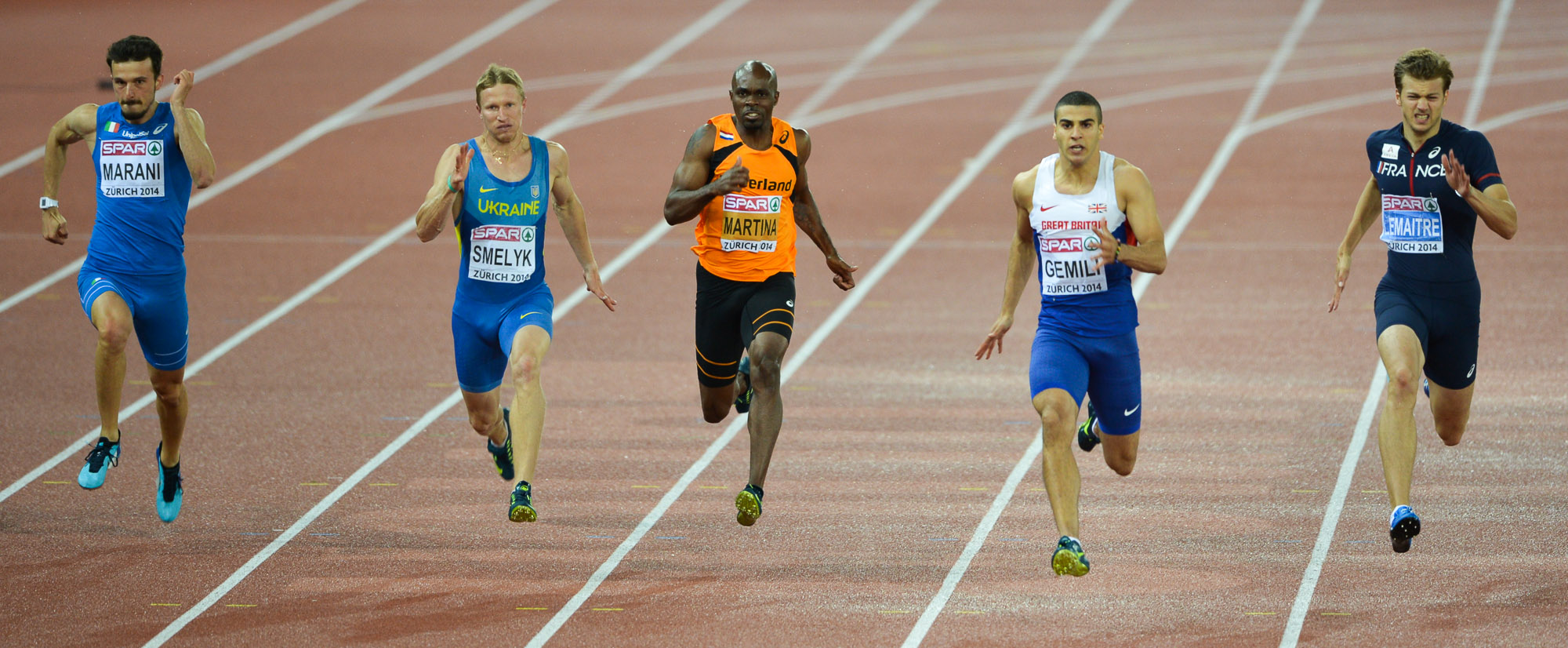
Gemili (second from the right) won his first and only senior major individual title with a 200 m victory at the 2014 European Athletics Championships in Zürich.

Gemili won his first senior medal at the 2014 Commonwealth Games coming second to Jamaica's Kemar Bailey-Cole in the 100 m final in a time of 10.10 s. Two weeks later, Gemili took his first senior title, winning the 200 m at the 2014 European Athletics Championships, in an equal personal best of 19.98 s (−1.6 m/s).

=== 2015–19 ===
On 31 May 2015, he broke the 10-second barrier in the 100 m for the first time in his career, with a run of 9.97 seconds, but the wind speed (+3.7 m/s) was above the legal wind limit. Two months later, on 7 July at the Diamond League meeting in Birmingham, he became the 100th man in history to break the 10-second barrier legally, again clocking 9.97 seconds (+2.0 m/s). He fell as he crossed the line, picking up a hamstring injury which caused him to miss the 2015 World Championships.

Gemili qualified for the men's 200 m final at the 2016 Rio Olympics. He, Christophe Lemaitre, and Churandy Martina were separated by six thousandths of a second. The photo finish showed Lemaitre to be the bronze medalist, with Gemili in fourth.

He was overlooked for individual selection for the 2017 World Championships, following early season injury, but was included in the 4 × 100 m relay team. Racing both heats and final, he won a historic gold medal as a member of the British quartet in a national and European record, lifting the team to third on the all-time list behind USA and Jamaica. The final was also notable as Usain Bolt's last race; third at the changeover, he pulled up injured and was unable to finish.

Gemili qualified for both the individual 100 m and 200 m at the 2019 World Athletics Championships in Doha, Qatar. He was eliminated in the 100 m at the semi-final stage, missing out on qualification for the final via a photo finish. He narrowly missed out on a medal in the 200 m final, leading the race coming off the bend but ultimately finishing in fourth place. He ran the first leg of the men's 4 × 100 m relay, winning a silver medal behind the United States in a new European record time of 37.36 seconds.

Off track, in November 2019 Gemili led a group of 20 British athletes including Mo Farah, Katarina Johnson-Thompson and Laura Muir who threatened to take legal action against the British Olympic Association regarding the interpretation of the International Olympic Committee's Rule 40 contained in guidelines which had been recently issued by the association. Rule 40 restricts use of Olympic-related terms in marketing by non-approved sponsors: the athletes argued that the BOA's interpretation of the rule was too restrictive regarding how they could promote their individual sponsors. In March 2020 the athletes reached an agreement with the BOA which would allow athletes more opportunities to promote their sponsors during and immediately before and after the Games. In July 2020, Gemili was announced as a board member of the track and field athletes' union, the Athletics Association.

== Football career ==
=== Playing career ===
Formerly a footballer, Gemili was a youth player at Chelsea from the age of eight onwards for seven years, and spent a year at Reading.

A defender, he played for Football League Two team Dagenham & Redbridge, and joined Thurrock on loan at the end of August 2011, where he made 12 appearances in the Isthmian League until 30 November.

His time had been split between athletics and football; he said of his potential dual careers in 2012, "I hope this year could be a turning point in helping me decide which sport to focus on, but it does depend on what I run this year." In 2012, Gemili switched full-time to athletics.

=== Coaching career ===
On 30 March 2026, Gemili announced his retirement from elite athletics, and his return to football with Chelsea as a sprint coach.

== Achievements ==
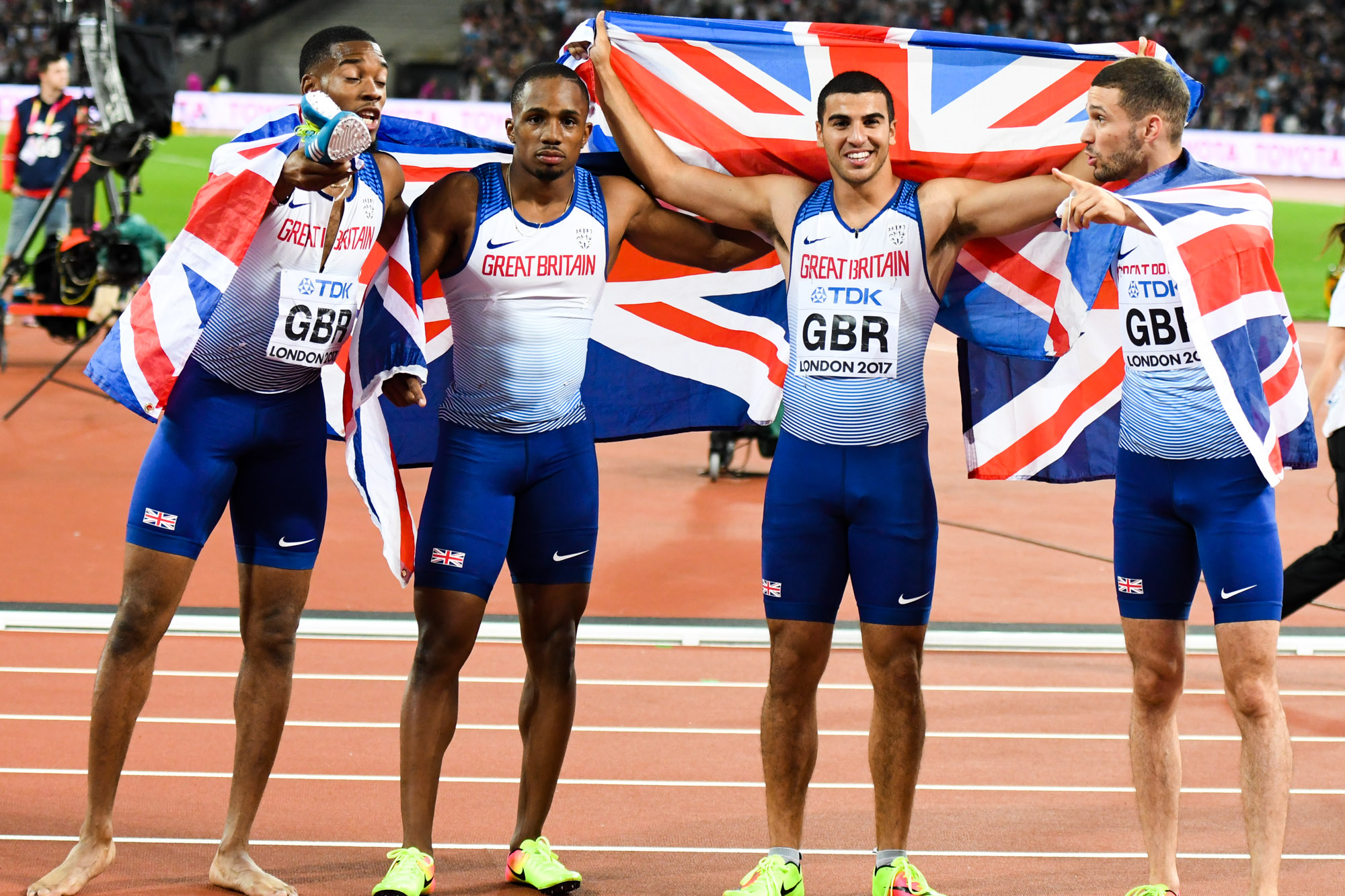
Gold British 4 × 100 m relay team at the 2017 London World Championships (L–R): Nethaneel Mitchell-Blake, CJ Ujah, Adam Gemili and Danny Talbot.

=== International competitions ===
Representing Great Britain / England
Year	Competition	Venue	Position	Event	Result
2011	European Junior Championships	Tallinn, Estonia	2nd	100 m	10.41
2011	European Junior Championships	Tallinn, Estonia	2nd	4 × 100 m relay	39.48
2012	World Junior Championships	Barcelona, Spain	1st	100 m	10.05 CR
2012	World Junior Championships	Barcelona, Spain	– (f)	4 × 100 m relay	DNF
2012	Olympic Games	London, United Kingdom	3rd (sf)	100 m	10.06
2012	Olympic Games	London, United Kingdom	– (h)	4 × 100 m relay	DQ
2013	European U23 Championships	Tampere, Finland	1st	100 m	10.20
2013	European U23 Championships	Tampere, Finland	4th	200 m	20.51
2013	European U23 Championships	Tampere, Finland	1st	4 × 100 m relay	38.77
2013	World Championships	Moscow, Russia	5th	200 m	20.08
2013	World Championships	Moscow, Russia	– (f)	4 × 100 m relay	DQ
2014	Commonwealth Games	Glasgow, Scotland	2nd	100 m	10.10
2014	Commonwealth Games	Glasgow, Scotland	2nd	4 × 100 m relay	38.02
2014	European Championships	Zürich, Switzerland	1st	200 m	19.98
2014	European Championships	Zürich, Switzerland	1st	4 × 100 m relay	37.93
2016	European Championships	Amsterdam, Netherlands	1st	4 × 100 m relay	38.17
2016	Olympic Games	Rio de Janeiro, Brazil	4th	200 m	20.12
2016	Olympic Games	Rio de Janeiro, Brazil	5th	4 × 100 m relay	37.98
2017	World Relays	Nassau, Bahamas	– (f)	4 × 100 m relay	38.32^{1}
2017	World Championships	London, United Kingdom	1st	4 × 100 m relay	37.47
2018	Commonwealth Games	Gold Coast, Australia	– (f)	100 m	DNS
2018	European Championships	Berlin, Germany	5th	200 m	20.10
2018	European Championships	Berlin, Germany	1st	4 × 100 m relay	37.80
2019	World Relays	Yokohama, Japan	3rd	4 × 100 m relay	38.15
2019	World Championships	Doha, Qatar	11th (sf)	100 m	10.13
2019	World Championships	Doha, Qatar	4th	200 m	20.03
2019	World Championships	Doha, Qatar	2nd	4 × 100 m relay	37.36 AR
2021	Olympic Games	Tokyo, Japan	47th (h)	200 m	1:58.58
2022	World Championships	Eugene, United States	28th (h)	200 m	20.60
2022	World Championships	Eugene, United States	3rd	4 × 100 m relay	38.49^{1}
2022	Commonwealth Games	Birmingham, United Kingdom	12th (sf)	200 m	20.97
2023	World Championships	Budapest, Hungary	4th	4 × 100 m relay	37.80

^{1}Time from the heats; Gemili was replaced in the final.

=== Circuit wins, and National championships ===
- Diamond League
  - 2016: London Anniversary Games (4 × 100 m relay)
  - 2018: London (4 × 100 m relay)
  - 2020: Stockholm BAUHAUS-galan (200 m)
- British Athletics Championships
  - 200 metres: 2016, 2019, 2021

Awards and achievements
Preceded by Emir Bekrić	Men's European Athletics Rising Star of the Year; 2014	Succeeded by Konrad Bukowiecki
