= Jeffrey John (athlete) =

French sprinter

Personal information
- Born: 6 June 1992 (age 33)

Sport
- Country: France
- Sport: Track and field
- Event: 200 metres

Jeffrey John (born 6 June 1992) is a French sprinter. He competed in the 200 metres event at the 2015 World Championships in Athletics in Beijing, China.

== Competition record ==
Year	Competition	Venue	Position	Event	Notes
Representing France
2009	European Youth Olympic Festival	Tampere, Finland	2nd	200 m	21.15
2009	European Youth Olympic Festival	Tampere, Finland	2nd	4 × 100 m relay	41.31
2010	World Junior Championships	Moncton, Canada	–	200 m	DQ
2010	World Junior Championships	Moncton, Canada	9th (h)	4 × 100 m relay	40.11
2011	European Junior Championships	Tallinn, Estonia	3rd	200 m	21.24
2011	European Junior Championships	Tallinn, Estonia	1st	4 × 100 m relay	39.35
2013	European U23 Championships	Tampere, Finland	8th	200 m	21.01
2013	European U23 Championships	Tampere, Finland	6th	4 × 100 m relay	39.46
2015	World Championships	Beijing, China	29th (h)	200 m	20.48
2017	IAAF World Relays	Nassau, Bahamas	–	4 × 200 m relay	DQ
2017	World Championships	London, United Kingdom	31st (h)	200 m	20.66
2017	Universiade	Taipei, Taiwan	1st	200 m	20.93
