= Khalfani Muhammad =

American football player (born 1994)

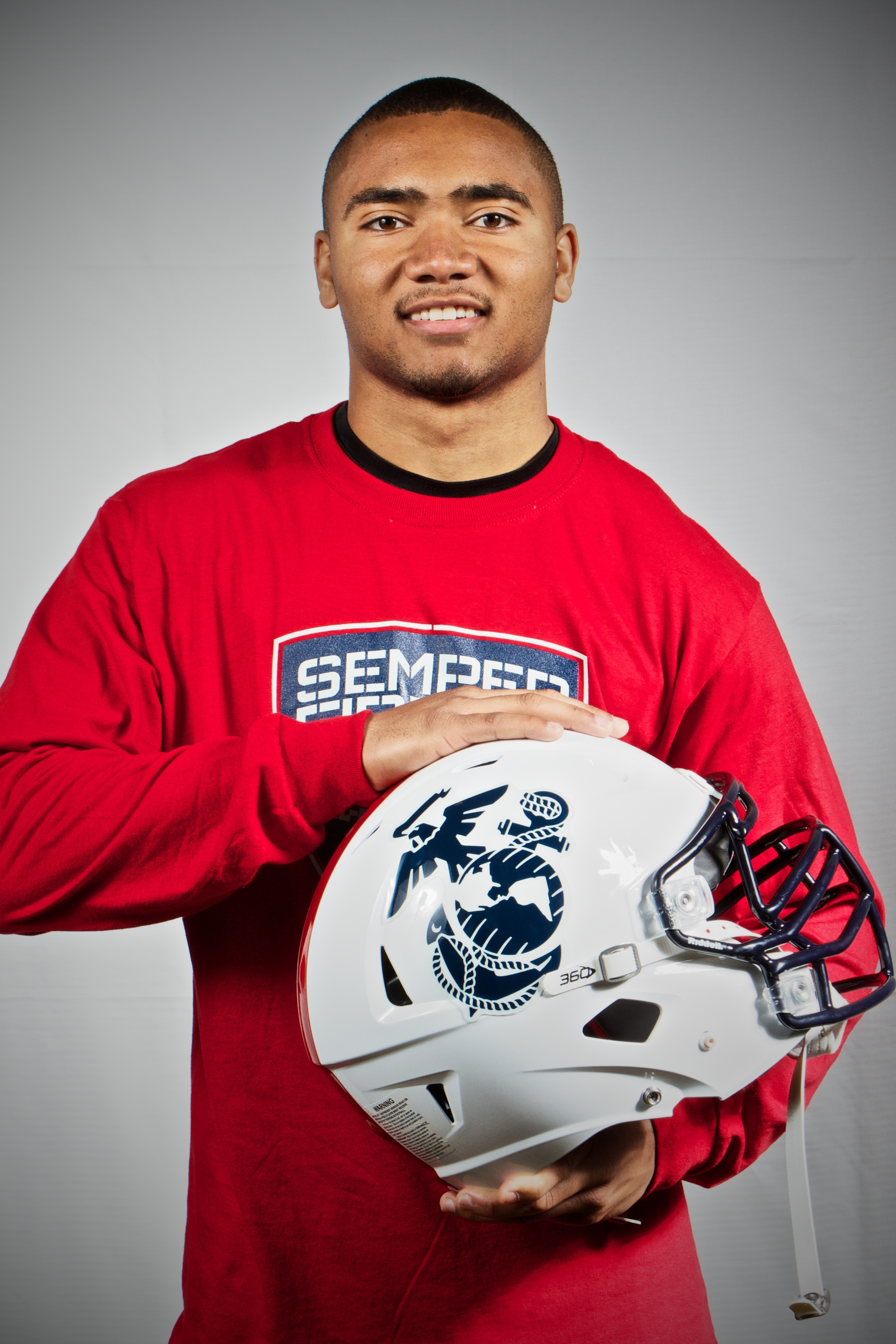
- Muhammad in 2012

No. 28, 42, 33
- Position: Running back

Personal information
- Born: September 26, 1994 (age 32); Inglewood, California, U.S.
- Listed height: 5 ft 7 in (1.70 m)
- Listed weight: 174 lb (79 kg)

Career information
- High school: Notre Dame (Sherman Oaks, California)
- College: California
- NFL draft: 2017: 7th round, 241st overall pick

Career history
- Tennessee Titans (2017); New England Patriots (2018)*; Denver Broncos (2018–2020)*; Arizona Cardinals (2020)*; Minnesota Vikings (2020)*; Arizona Cardinals (2021)*
- * Offseason or practice squad member only
- Stats at Pro Football Reference

Khalfani Muhammad
Personal information
- Nationality: Puerto Rican

Sport
- Sport: Track and field
- Event: Sprinting

Achievements and titles
- Personal bests: 100m: 10.24 (2023); 200m: 20.72 (2019)

Khalfani Amir Muhammad (born September 26, 1994) is a Puerto Rican sprinter and former American football running back. He played college football at California.

Muhammad was an accomplished track athlete in high school, winning both the 100 meter dash and 200 meter dash at the 2012 and 2013 CIF California State Meet. He recorded a personal best of a 10.22 seconds in the 100 meter dash, the second-fastest time in California prep history.

Muhammad never played in a regular season NFL game. He was selected by the Tennessee Titans in the seventh round of the 2017 NFL draft and spent the majority of his rookie year on the Titans' practice squad. He then spent parts of the next four seasons on the rosters of the New England Patriots, Denver Broncos, Arizona Cardinals and Minnesota Vikings as either an offseason or practice squad player.

== Early life ==
Khalfani attended Notre Dame High School in Sherman Oaks, California, he finished his prep football career with 3,397 rushing yards and 44 touchdowns on the ground over 559 carries, while adding 48 receptions for 704 yards receiving and four scoring catches to total 288 points. As a senior, he led the Serra League in rushing yards (1,420) on 215 carries, rushing touchdowns (18) and scoring (120 points) when his team finished ranked No. 15 in the state by MaxPreps while reaching the quarterfinals of the Southern Section Pac 5 Division playoffs following a Serra League co-title. Posted a career-high 247 rushing yards with a single-game career-high-tying four touchdowns on the ground against Bishop Amat. As a junior, he rushed for 1,126 yards on 183 carries and 13 Touchdowns, while adding receptions for 118 yards and a touchdown. Played in the Semper Fidelis All-American Bowl following a 2012 senior season in which he earned numerous other honors including All-American (PrepStar), first-team Division I All-State (MaxPreps), second-team All-State (Cal-Hi Sports), first-team All-Area (Los Angeles Daily News, Los Angeles Times), second-team All-Southern Section (Rivals) and Serra League Co-MVP selections

In track, Khalfani is the third person ever to win back-to-back individual California boys state titles in the 100 and 200 meters during his 2012 junior and 2013 senior track and field campaigns. Recorded a personal best of a wind-aided 10.22 in the 100 meters which is the second-fastest time in California prep history, while his top legal time as a prep was a 10.33 to capture the 2013 state title. His prep personal best in the 200 meters was 20.73. As a 2011 sophomore, he placed second at the state meet in both the 100 and 200 meters. Khalfani earned California's Gatorade State Boys Track and Field Athlete of the Year as a senior and 2x CalHiSports State Boys Athlete of the Year (2012, 2013).

== Professional career ==
=== Tennessee Titans ===
Muhammad was drafted by the Tennessee Titans in the seventh round, 241st overall, in the 2017 NFL draft. He was the last of three California Bears to be selected that year. On May 12, the Titans signed Muhammad to a four-year, $2.47 million contract with a signing bonus of $70,837. He was waived on September 2, 2017, and was signed to the Titans' practice squad the next day. He was promoted to the active roster on December 29, 2017. However, he did not play in a game for the Titans. On April 30, 2018, Muhammad was released.

=== New England Patriots ===
On August 27, 2018, Muhammad signed with the New England Patriots. He was waived on August 31, 2018.

=== Denver Broncos ===
On December 3, 2018, Muhammad was signed to the Denver Broncos practice squad. On January, 2, 2019, Muhammad was re-signed to reserve/future contract.

Muhammad was waived on August 31, 2019, and was re-signed to the practice squad. He signed a reserve/future contract with the Broncos on December 31, 2019. He was waived on July 27, 2020.

=== Arizona Cardinals (first stint) ===
On October 28, 2020, Muhammad was signed to the Arizona Cardinals' practice squad. He was released on November 24, 2020.

=== Minnesota Vikings ===
On December 14, 2020, Muhammad was signed to the Minnesota Vikings practice squad.

=== Arizona Cardinals (second stint) ===
On January 5, 2021, Muhammad signed a reserve/future contract with the Cardinals. He was waived on August 7, 2021.
