= David Bolarinwa =

British sprinter (born 1993)

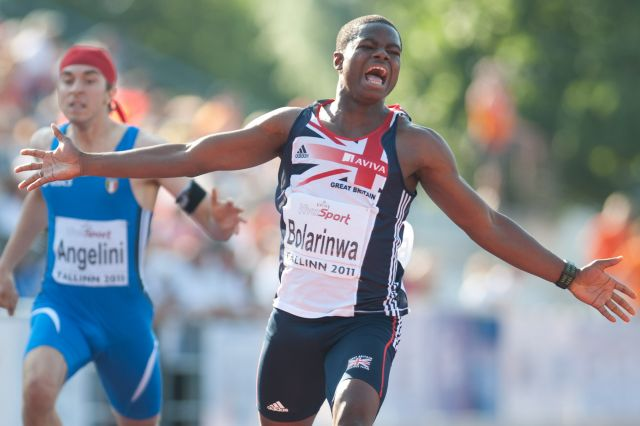
- David Bolarinwa at the 2011 European Athletics Junior Championships in Tallinn

Personal information
- Nationality: Great Britain
- Born: 20 October 1993 (age 32) London

Sport
- Sport: Running
- Event: Sprints

Achievements and titles
- Personal best(s): 100 m: 10.29 (Bedford 2011); 200 m: 20.60 (Regensburg 2013)
Medal record
Men's athletics
Representing Great Britain
European Junior Championships
Gold medal – first place	2011 Tallinn	200 m
Silver medal – second place	2011 Tallinn	4×100 m relay
Bronze medal – third place	2011 Tallinn	100 m
Summer Youth Olympics
Silver medal – second place	2010 Singapore	Medley relay
Bronze medal – third place	2010 Singapore	100 m

David Bolarinwa (born 20 October 1993) is a British sprinter.

== Sporting career ==
At the inaugural 2010 Summer Youth Olympics in Singapore, Bolarinwa won a bronze medal at the 100 metres, behind Odean Skeen and Masaki Nashimoto. He had entered the race as the favourite, since he ran a world leading 10.39 sec just two weeks earlier, and was the fastest in the qualifying heats. Competing for Woolwich Polytechnic School, Bolarinwa won 100 m at the 2010 UK School Games, breaking his own school games record to finish in 10.81 seconds. Bolarinwa's personal best of 10.39 sec is the second-fastest by an under-17 year old ("Youth") in the UK, second only to Mark Lewis-Francis' 10.31 sec in 1999. His twin brother Daniel is a semi-professional footballer, who played for Staines Town F.C., Hitchin Town F.C. and Welling United F.C.
