= South Lake High School (Florida) =

Coordinates: 28.574459°N 81.817589°W

Location
- 15600 Silver Eagle Road; Groveland, Florida 34736; United States

Information
- Type: Public high school
- Motto: "Raising the Standard of Excellence"
- Established: 1993
- Principal: Steven Benson
- Teaching staff: 100.00 (FTE)
- Grades: 9–12
- Enrollment: 2,189 (2023–2024)
- Student to teacher ratio: 21.89
- Colors: Blue; Silver
- Team name: Eagles
- Website: slh.lake.k12.fl.us

South Lake High School, commonly referred to as South Lake, is a high school located in Groveland, Florida, United States. It is one of eight public high schools in the Lake County School District, and is the second-largest high school in the district. Located in southern Lake County, the school serves Groveland, Mascotte, and parts of Clermont and Minneola.

South Lake High was founded in 1993 by consolidating Clermont High School and Groveland High School. As of 2017, enrollment consists of around 2,000 students. It has approximately 120 certified teachers and 6 administrators. Its colors are blue and silver. The athletic teams, called the Eagles, are represented by a bald eagle.

== Facility ==
The school structure was originally completed in Fall 1993 to educate around 1,800 students. The main building is a two-story structure, housing administrative offices, guidance offices, and approximately 40 classrooms. An additional two-floor structure was completed in 2007 to house core academic courses. It was originally built to house freshmen courses, but has since been converted to house multiple grades. Due to multiple campus updates and the addition of portable classrooms as of Summer 2011 it has a capacity of around 2,400.

The South Lake High campus has a library, a cafeteria, an auditorium, a band/chorus building, a gym containing a dance room, weight room, a basketball/volleyball court, and three vocational buildings. One of these houses the culinary and JROTC program. This vocational building was converted from the original cafeteria. The campus also includes several portables, six tennis courts, a track, and a football field and stadium.

== Student body ==
South Lake High opened with approximately 1100 students, 700 from Clermont and 400 from Groveland. By 2009 the school had grown to around 2,200 students. At the inception of Lake Minneola High in Fall 2011 there was a reduction in the number of students to an expected 1,730. The school has since returned to around 2,000 students.

== Notable alumni ==
- Jeff Demps - Running back for the Tampa Bay Buccaneers, and competed in the 4x100 men's relay in London 2012
- John Koronka - Former professional baseball player (Chicago Cubs, Texas Rangers, Florida Marlins)
- Roberto Aguayo - Kicker for the New England Patriots and 2013 Lou Groza Award winner
- Jonotthan Harrison - NFL player for the Indianapolis Colts
