= Jeff Demps =

American football player and sprinter (born 1990)

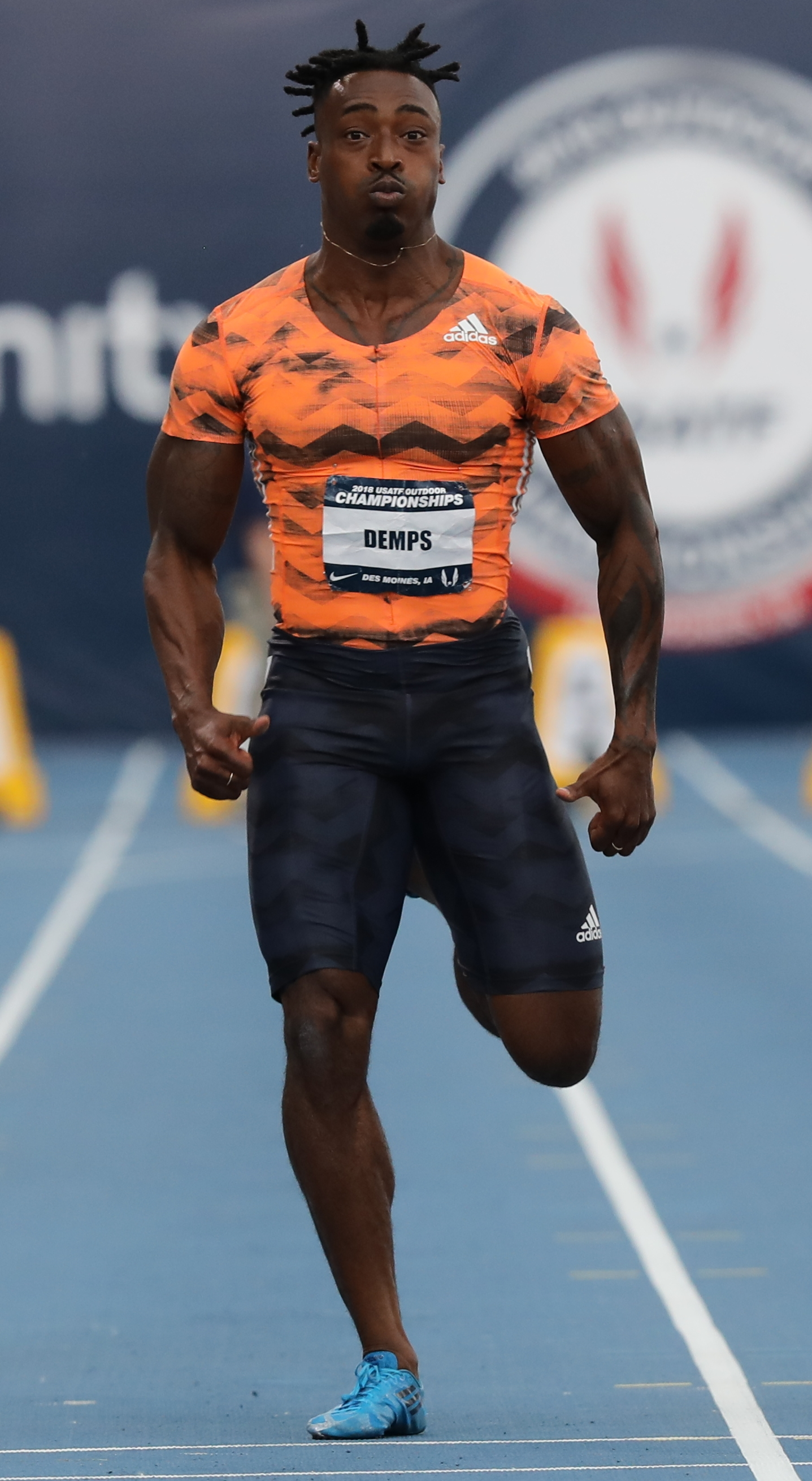
- Demps in 2018

No. 42, 32
- Position: Running back

Personal information
- Born: January 8, 1990 (age 36); Winter Garden, Florida, U.S.
- Listed height: 5 ft 7 in (1.70 m)
- Listed weight: 191 lb (87 kg)

Career information
- High school: South Lake (Groveland, Florida)
- College: Florida
- NFL draft: 2012: undrafted

Career history
- New England Patriots (2012); Tampa Bay Buccaneers (2013–2014); Indianapolis Colts (2014–2015)*
- * Offseason or practice squad member only

Awards and highlights
- BCS national champion (2009)

Career NFL statistics
- Rushing attempts: 1
- Rushing yards: 14
- Receptions: 3
- Receiving yards: 21
- Stats at Pro Football Reference

Jeffery Barnard Demps (born January 8, 1990) is an American former track and field athlete and professional football running back. He attended the University of Florida, where he was a running back for the Florida Gators football team and a sprinter for the Florida Gators track and field team.

He is the only Florida Gator athlete to have won national championships in two sports with his 2009 BCS National Championship and multiple indoor and outdoor track titles over his four-year career. Demps matched the 100 meters world junior record with a time of 10.01 seconds in June 2008.

In January 2012, Demps decided to focus on the 2012 United States Olympic Trials instead of the 2012 NFL draft, pursuing a career in track rather than professional football. Demps signed a contract with the NFL's New England Patriots on August 17, 2012. He was a running back for the New England Patriots, Tampa Bay Buccaneers, and the Indianapolis Colts. He only had regular season playing time with the Buccaneers.

== Early life ==
Demps attended South Lake High School in Groveland, Florida, where he was a second-team Class 4A all-state selection at running back, gaining 1,401 yards on the ground, along with 16 touchdowns on 157 carries during his senior year. As a junior, he rushed for 21 touchdowns and 1,761 yards on 170 carries, earning second-team all-state Class 3A selection honors. Regarded as a four-star recruit by Rivals.com, Demps was listed as the No. 36 football prospect from the state of Florida in 2008.

In track, he ran the 100 meters at the Florida state final, the fastest time recorded at that event at 10.37 seconds. He also clocked a 10.25 at the AAU Junior Olympics, the second-fastest time ever in the state and the fastest clocking recorded by a high school senior that year. Competing at the 2008 U.S. Olympic trials, Demps set a new national high school record with 10.01 seconds, beating J-Mee Samuels' 10.08 seconds. His time also equaled the 100 meters world junior record, originally established by Darrel Brown in 2003.

== College career ==
=== Football ===
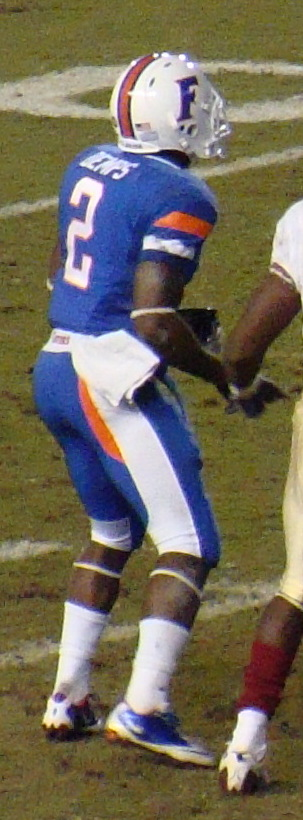
Demps with the Florida Gators in 2009

Demps played a key role in Florida's third national championship season, rushing 78 times for 605 yards, averaging 7.8 yards per carry as a freshman. During his sophomore season Demps rushed for a career high 745 yards on 99 carries and 7 scores. He also averaged 7.5 yards a carry that season. During his junior season, Demps battled several injuries which caused him to rush for a career low 551 yards on 92 carries and 3 touchdowns. as a senior, Jeff Demps rushed for 569 yards on 98 carries and 6 touchdowns. This included a career long 84-yard touchdown score against Kentucky.

=== Statistics ===
Year	Stat	Carries	Yards	Average	TD
2008	Rushing	78	605	7.8	7
2009	Rushing	99	745	7.5	7
2010	Rushing	92	551	6.0	3
2011	Rushing	98	569	5.8	6

=== Track and field ===
Jeff Demps
Medal record

Men's athletics

Representing the United States

Olympic Games
Disqualified	2012 London	4×100 m relay

In 2009, Demps competed in four outdoor meets for the Gators' track and field team. He ran the anchor leg of Florida's SEC Championship 4 × 100 m relay team (alongside Jeremy Hall, Calvin Smith Jr., and Terrell Wilks), which recorded the third-fastest time in school history (38.74) and won Florida's first the 4×100-meter relay title since the 2004 season. Following an injury, Demps only ran a 10.30 over 100 meters at the SEC Championships, placing him ninth overall. At the War Eagle Invitational, Demps helped the Gators win the 4×100-meter relay.

In March 2010, Demps won the 60 meters in 6.56 seconds at the 2010 NCAA Indoor Track and Field Championships in Fayetteville, Arkansas. Three months later at the NCAA Outdoor Track and Field Championships, he beat favored Rondel Sorrillo by a margin of .13 seconds, claiming the school's first 100-meter NCAA title since Bernard Williams won in 2000. Demps' time of 9.96 would have been a new school record had the race not been heavily wind-aided (+2.5 m/s). He claimed the 2012 NCAA Indoor title over 60 meters with a personal best run of 6.52 in the heats, then time of 6.56 seconds to win the final. At the 85th Texas Relays in March 2012, Demps won the 100 metres in the university group, ahead of Aaron Ernest of LSU.

On July 25, 2012, Demps was added to the 2012 U.S. Olympic roster as a member of the 4×100 meter relay pool, serving as a replacement for Mike Rodgers, who suffered a stress fracture in his left foot. He raced the first leg of the preliminary second heat and helped the U.S. 4×100 relay team achieve a time of the 37.38 seconds, which was the fastest time of the preliminary round and broke a 20-year-old American record. The team would go on to win a silver medal in the final round with Tyson Gay and Ryan Bailey instead of Demps and preliminary teammate Darvis Patton, but as part of the team, Demps still received a medal. The medal was later stripped, after Gay admitted to using a banned substance. During the 2018 season, Demps has won the Cayman Invitational and the Bermuda Invitational track meets both in the 100m. He also placed 6th in the USATF National Championships with a time of 10.02 seconds.

==== Personal bests ====
Event	Time (seconds)	Venue	Date
60 meters	6.52	Nampa, Idaho	March 9, 2012
100 meters	10.01	Eugene, Oregon	June 28, 2008
200 meters	21.04	Sanford, Florida	April 6, 2012

== Professional career ==
=== New England Patriots ===
Demps skipped the 2012 NFL Combine and Draft in favor of preparing for the 2012 Summer Olympics. However, he attracted interest from NFL teams after the Olympics, and agreed to terms on a three-year deal with the New England Patriots on August 17, 2012. On August 31, 2012, he was placed on injured reserve and thus missed the entire 2012 season.

=== Tampa Bay Buccaneers ===
On April 27, 2013, the Patriots traded Demps to the Tampa Bay Buccaneers along with a seventh-round selection (229th overall) in the 2013 NFL draft for running back LeGarrette Blount. Demps was released by the Buccaneers on August 30, 2014, as part of the final roster cuts. On August 31, Demps was re-signed to the Buccaneers' practice squad.

=== Indianapolis Colts ===
Demps signed with the Indianapolis Colts on October 21, 2014. He was released on October 29, and re-signed on November 25. Demps was waived by Indianapolis on May 4, 2015.

== Personal life ==
Demps' cousin is Cleveland Browns wide receiver Malachi Corley.
