= James Taylor (disambiguation) =

James Taylor (born 1948) is an American singer-songwriter.

James Taylor may also refer to:

== Arts and entertainment ==
- James Taylor (album), American singer-songwriter's debut album
- James Taylor (American author), American fiction writer
- James Taylor (British author) (born 1963), British writer on maritime art
- James Taylor (tenor) (born 1966), American opera singer
- James Arnold Taylor (born 1969), American voice actor
- James J. Taylor (1931–2005), videographer
- James "J.T." Taylor (born 1953), lead singer with the band Kool & the Gang
- J. G. Taylor (James Goulde Taylor), English actor
- James Taylor Move, Australian psychedelic rock band
- James Taylor, British acid jazz musician, leader of the James Taylor Quartet
- James S. Taylor, of the UK house band Swayzak

== Government and politics ==
=== Australia ===
- James Taylor (New South Wales politician)
- James Taylor (Queensland politician) (1820–1895), Queensland politician
- James Taylor (Victorian politician) (born 1934), Victorian politician

=== Canada ===
- James Taylor (1761–1834), farmer, merchant and political figure in New Brunswick
- James Taylor (d. 1856), businessman and political figure in New Brunswick
- James Taylor (Nova Scotia politician) (1771–1801), merchant and politician in Nova Scotia
- James A. Taylor (1928–2020), Ontario legislator who represented the Prince Edward—Lennox district
- James Davis Taylor (1863–1941), Canadian member of parliament
- James H. Taylor (born 1930), Canadian ambassador to Japan
- James Samuel Taylor (1872–1960), Canadian politician, printer and publisher

=== United Kingdom and Ireland ===
- James Alastair Taylor (1951–2021), sheriff principal of the sheriffdom of Glasgow and Strathkelvin
- James Arthur Taylor (1817–1889), British politician, member of parliament for East Worcestershire
- James Banks Taylor (died 1884), British businessman and member of the Legislative Council of Hong Kong
- James Taylor (Irish politician) (1700–1747), Anglo-Irish politician

=== United States ===
- J. Alfred Taylor (1878–1956), U.S. representative from West Virginia
- J. Will Taylor (James Willis Taylor, 1880–1939), US congressman from Tennessee
- James Taylor (Arizona politician), Arizona state legislator
- James Taylor (New Mexico politician) (born 1966), New Mexico state senator
- James Taylor (Virginia politician) (1670–1729), American politician from Virginia
- James Andrew Taylor (1835–1906), Wisconsin politician
- James C. Taylor (1930–1999), Illinois state legislator
- James Craig Taylor (1826–1887), Virginia lawyer, newspaper publisher and politician
- James Knox Taylor (1857–1929), supervising architect of the United States Department of the Treasury
- James T. S. Taylor (1840–1918), Virginia politician and activist
- James Wickes Taylor (1819–1893), American diplomat

== Military ==
- James Taylor (Alamo defender) (c. 1814–1836), soldier
- James Taylor Jr. (banker) (1769–1848), American quartermaster general and banker, War of 1812, founder of Newport, Kentucky
- James Allen Taylor (born 1937), U.S. Army officer and Medal of Honor recipient
- James E. Taylor (born 1935), U.S. Navy admiral

== Religion ==
- James Taylor (Presbyterian minister) (1813–1892), Scottish Presbyterian minister and historical author
- James Taylor (nonconformist minister) (fl. 1847), English nonconformist minister
- James Taylor Jr. (Exclusive Brethren) (1899–1970), New York leader of Raven-Taylor Exclusive Brethren assemblies
- James Hudson Taylor (1832–1905), British Protestant Christian missionary to China, founder of the China Inland Mission (aka OMF Intl.)
- James Ignatius Taylor (1805–1875), Irish priest and educator

== Sports ==
=== Cricket ===
- James Taylor (cricketer, born 1809) (1809–?), English professional cricketer
- James Taylor (cricketer, born 1846) (1846–1915), English cricketer
- James Taylor (cricketer, born 1974), English cricketer
- James Taylor (cricketer, born 1990), English Test cricketer
- James Taylor (cricketer, born 2001), English cricketer
- James Taylor (Scottish cricketer) (1929–2019), Scottish cricketer
- James Taylor (sportsman) (1917–1993), English-born Scottish cricketer, umpire

=== Other sports ===
- James Taylor (cyclist), British track cyclist
- James Taylor (sports administrator) (1871–1944), Australian sports administrator
- Jay Taylor (placekicker) (James Taylor, born 1976), American football kicker
- Candy Jim Taylor (James Allen Taylor, 1884–1948), player and manager in Negro baseball league
- Zack Taylor (baseball) (James Wren Taylor, 1898–1974), player and manager in Major League baseball
- James Taylor, British race car driver, see 1998 International Formula 3000 season
- James Taylor (footballer) (born 2001), English footballer

== Other ==
- James Taylor (lawyer), American lawyer who works for the Heartland Institute
- James Taylor (ceramicist) (1839-1898), English-American maker of architectural terracotta
- James Taylor (neurologist) (1859–1946), British neurologist
- James Taylor (tea planter) (1835–1892), in Sri Lanka
- James B. Taylor (educator) (1927–2016), vice-principal of the Los Angeles Unified School District
- James Blackstone Taylor (1921–2003), American marketing executive
- James Braid Taylor (1891–1943), governor of the Reserve Bank of India
- James Haward Taylor (1909–1968), British geologist
- James Henry Taylor (1893–1972), American mathematics professor
- James M. Taylor (1930–1970), astronaut
- James Madison Taylor, known as Matt Taylor, early settler of southeastern Idaho
- James R. Taylor (1928–2022), communications professor at University of Montreal
- James Monroe Taylor (1848–1916), Baptist minister and president of Vassar College
- James Bayard Taylor (1825–1878), American poet, literary critic, author, and diplomat

== See also ==
- Jamie Taylor (born 1982), footballer
- James Chapman-Taylor (1878–1958), New Zealand architect
- James Taylor Jr. (disambiguation)
- James Tylor (born 1986), Australian artist
- Jim Taylor (disambiguation)
