= Jim Taylor =

Jim or Jimmy Taylor may refer to:

== Sports ==
=== American football ===
- Jim Taylor (fullback) (1935–2018), American football player
- Jim Taylor (linebacker) (1934–2005), American football player
- Jim Taylor (tackle), American college football player
- Jim Bob Taylor (born 1959), American football quarterback

=== Association football ===
- Jim Taylor (footballer, born 1917) (1917–2001), English football player
- Jim Taylor (footballer, born 1934) (1934–2017), English football player
- Jim Taylor (footballer, born 1944) (born 1944), Scottish footballer

=== Australian rules football ===
- Jim Taylor (Australian footballer) (1932–2000), Australian rules footballer for South Melbourne and Norwood
- Jim Taylor (footballer, born 1893) (1893–1969), Australian rules footballer for Essendon
- Jim Taylor (footballer, born 1907) (1907–1987), Australian rules footballer for St Kilda

=== Other sports ===
- Jimmy Taylor (basketball), South Alabama college basketball coach
- Jimmy Taylor (rugby league) (born 1984), rugby league player
- Candy Jim Taylor (1884–1948), American baseball player
- Jimmie Taylor (born 1995), American basketball player

== Other ==
- James Blackstone Taylor, American aviation executive
- Jim Taylor (Afghan war) (born 1986), witness at Omar Khadr's Guantanamo military commission
- Jim Taylor (explorer) (1901–1987), explorer born in Australia
- Jim Taylor (politician) (1920–2005), Australian politician
- Jim Taylor (writer) (born 1963), American film producer and screenwriter
- Jim B. Taylor (1860–1944), South African Randlord, i.e. manager of diamond and gold mines
- James R. Taylor (1928–2022), Canadian communications professor
- Jimmy Taylor (Jericho), character on TV series
- Jim Taylor, cowboy leader involved in the Sutton–Taylor feud
- Disappearance of Jimmy Taylor, Australian boy who disappeared at 12

== See also ==
- James Taylor (disambiguation)
- Jamie Taylor (born 1982), footballer
