= Admiral Taylor =

Admiral Taylor may refer to:

- Bertram Taylor (Royal Navy officer) (1906–1970), British Royal Navy rear admiral
- David W. Taylor (1864–1940), U.S. Navy rear admiral
- Edmund B. Taylor (1904–1973), U.S. Navy vice admiral
- Ernest Taylor (Royal Navy officer) (1876–1971), British Royal Navy vice admiral
- Henry Clay Taylor (1845–1904), U.S. Navy rear admiral
- James E. Taylor (born 1935), U.S. Navy rear admiral
- William Taylor (Royal Navy officer, born 1760) (died 1842), British Royal Navy admiral
- William Rogers Taylor (1811–1889), U.S. Navy rear admiral
- Montgomery M. Taylor (1869–1952), U.S. Navy admiral
- Rodney Taylor (1940–2002), Royal Australian Navy vice admiral
- Rufus Taylor (1910–1978), U.S. Navy vice admiral

== See also ==
- Joseph Needham Tayler (1783–1864), British Royal Navy vice admiral
