= Freehold land society =

Freehold land societies were a type of building society that flourished in England in the late 1840s and early 1850s, although new societies continued to be established for several more decades and some were still operating in the early 20th century.

Their original purpose was to acquire land and divide it into plots or allotments of a size that would entitle the (male) owner to a vote. The key stimulus was the Reform Act 1832 which, under the county franchise, gave the vote to "forty-shilling freeholders" – men in possession of land worth 40 shillings a year.

Initially supporters of the Liberal party were the main promoters of freehold land societies, with the aim of increasing the number of Liberal MPs. The Conservative party and others took up the idea, and by the early 1850s there were at least 180 societies established.

The first society is usually considered to be the Birmingham Freehold Land Society, established in 1847 by a local temperance campaigner James Taylor (although not registered until 1849) and by 1851 at least seventy societies were in existence, almost all in the Midlands and Northern England. Many of these early societies were ‘rooted in the working-class ethic of self help’ and at least nominally intended to provide the vote and home ownership for working men. From the early 1850s the majority of new societies had a more commercial aim of acquiring cheap land for housing and London became the main focus for new societies.
