= James Taylor Jr. =

James Taylor Jr. may refer to:

- James Taylor Jr. (banker) (1769–1848), American banker and early settler of Kentucky
- James Taylor Jr. (Exclusive Brethren) (1899–1970), American leader of the Exclusive Brethren

== See also ==
- James Taylor (disambiguation)
