= De Havilland Canada DHC-2 Beaver =

Single engine STOL aircraft

DHC-2 Beaver
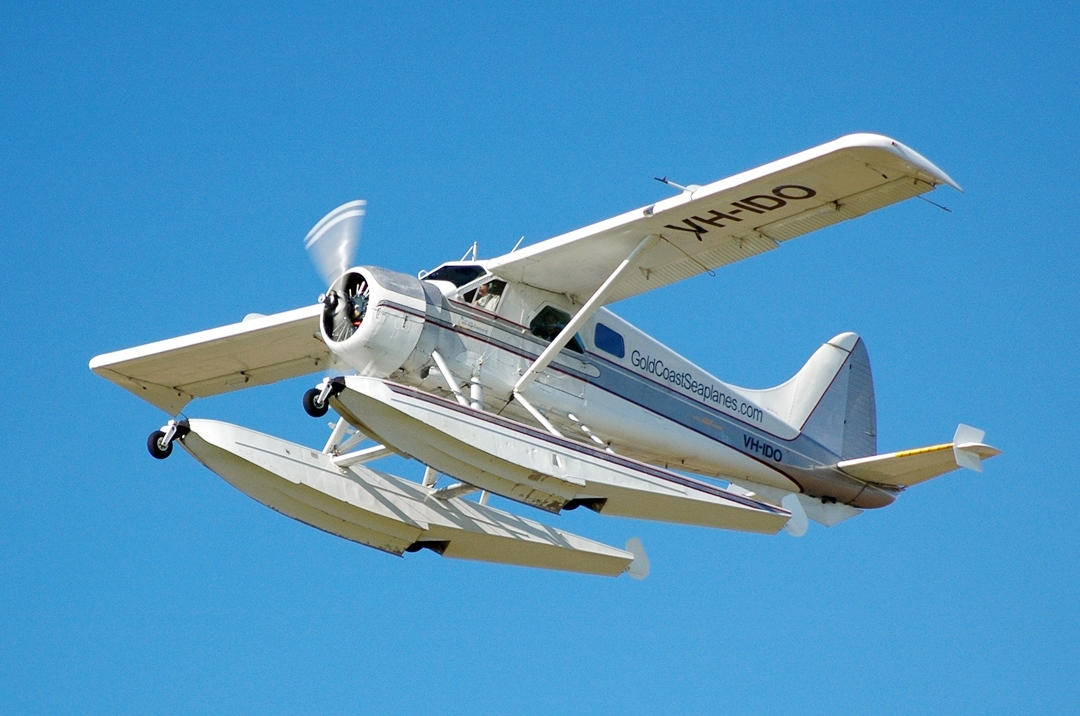
- A de Havilland Canada DHC-2 Beaver Mk1 amphibious floatplane

General information
- Type: STOL utility transport
- National origin: Canada
- Manufacturer: de Havilland Canada
- Status: In service
- Primary users: regional and remote air carriers United States Army; Civil Air Patrol
- Number built: 1,657

History
- Manufactured: 1947–1967
- Introduction date: 1948
- First flight: 16 August 1947

The de Havilland Canada DHC-2 Beaver is a single-engined high-wing propeller-driven short takeoff and landing (STOL) aircraft developed and manufactured by de Havilland Canada. It has been primarily operated as a bush plane and has been used for a wide variety of utility roles, such as cargo and passenger hauling, aerial application (crop dusting and aerial topdressing), and civil aviation duties.

Shortly after the end of the Second World War, de Havilland Canada decided to orient itself towards civilian operators. Based on feedback from pilots, the company decided that the envisioned aircraft should have excellent STOL performance, all-metal construction, and accommodate many features sought by the operators of bush planes. On 16 August 1947, the maiden flight of the aircraft, which had received the designation DHC-2 Beaver, took place. In April 1948, the first production aircraft was delivered to the Ontario Department of Lands and Forests. A Royal New Zealand Air Force (RNZAF) Beaver played a supporting role in Sir Edmund Hillary's 1958 Commonwealth Trans-Antarctic Expedition to the South Pole.

In addition to its use in civilian operations, the Beaver has been widely adopted by armed forces as a utility aircraft. The United States Army purchased several hundred aircraft; nine DHC-2s are still in service with the U.S. Air Force Auxiliary (Civil Air Patrol) for search and rescue. By 1967, over 1,600 Beavers had been constructed prior to the closure of the original assembly line. Various aircraft have been remanufactured and upgraded. Additionally, various proposals have been made to return the Beaver to production.

The Beaver's versatility and performance led to it being the preferred aircraft of bush pilots servicing remote locations in the Canadian north, and it is considered by aviation historians to be a Canadian icon. In 1987, the Canadian Engineering Centennial Board named the DHC-2 one of the top ten Canadian engineering achievements of the 20th century. The Royal Canadian Mint honoured the aircraft on a special edition Canadian quarter in November 1999, and on a 50-cent commemorative gold coin in 2008. Large numbers continue to be operational into the 21st century, while the tooling and type certificate for the Beaver have been acquired by Viking Air, later reorganized as De Havilland Canada, who continue to produce replacement components and refurbish examples of the type.

== Development ==
=== Origins ===
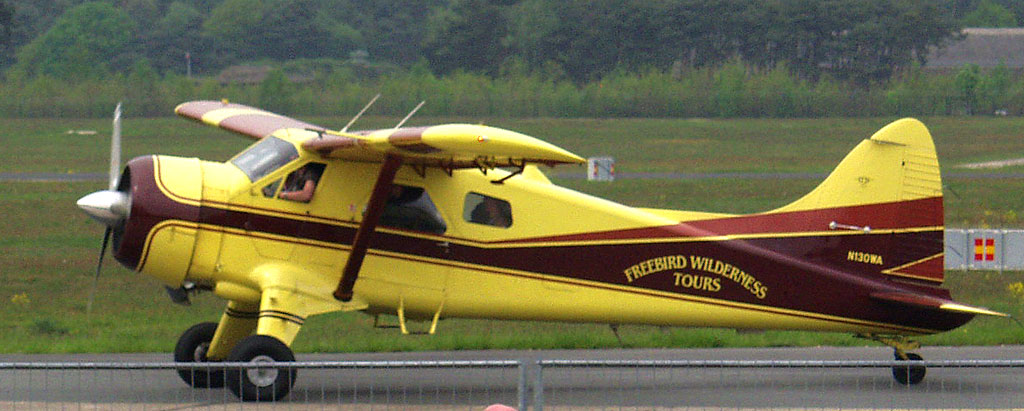
A Beaver, operated by Freebird Wilderness Tours, at Airport Niederrhein in Germany

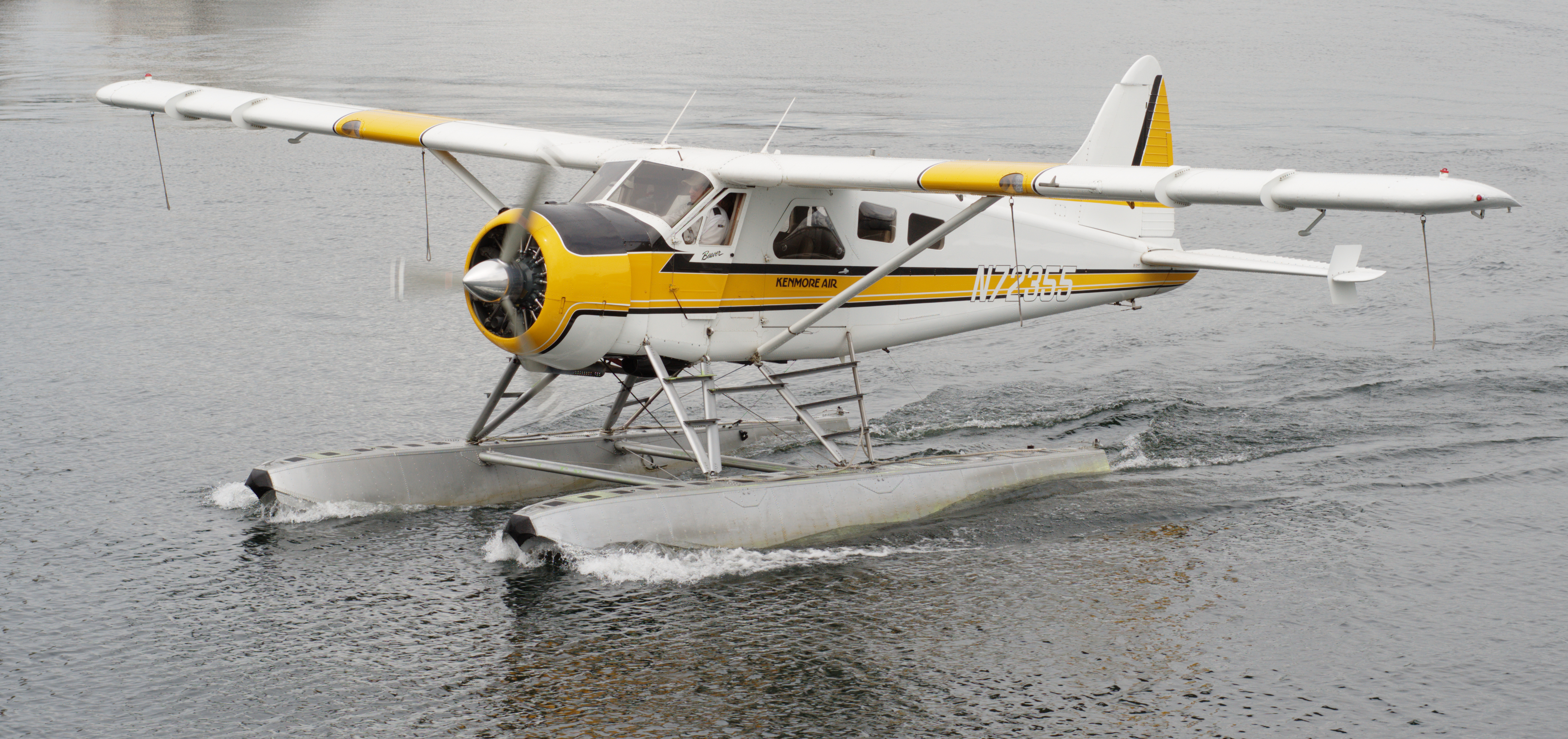
DHC-2 on floats, operated by Kenmore Air

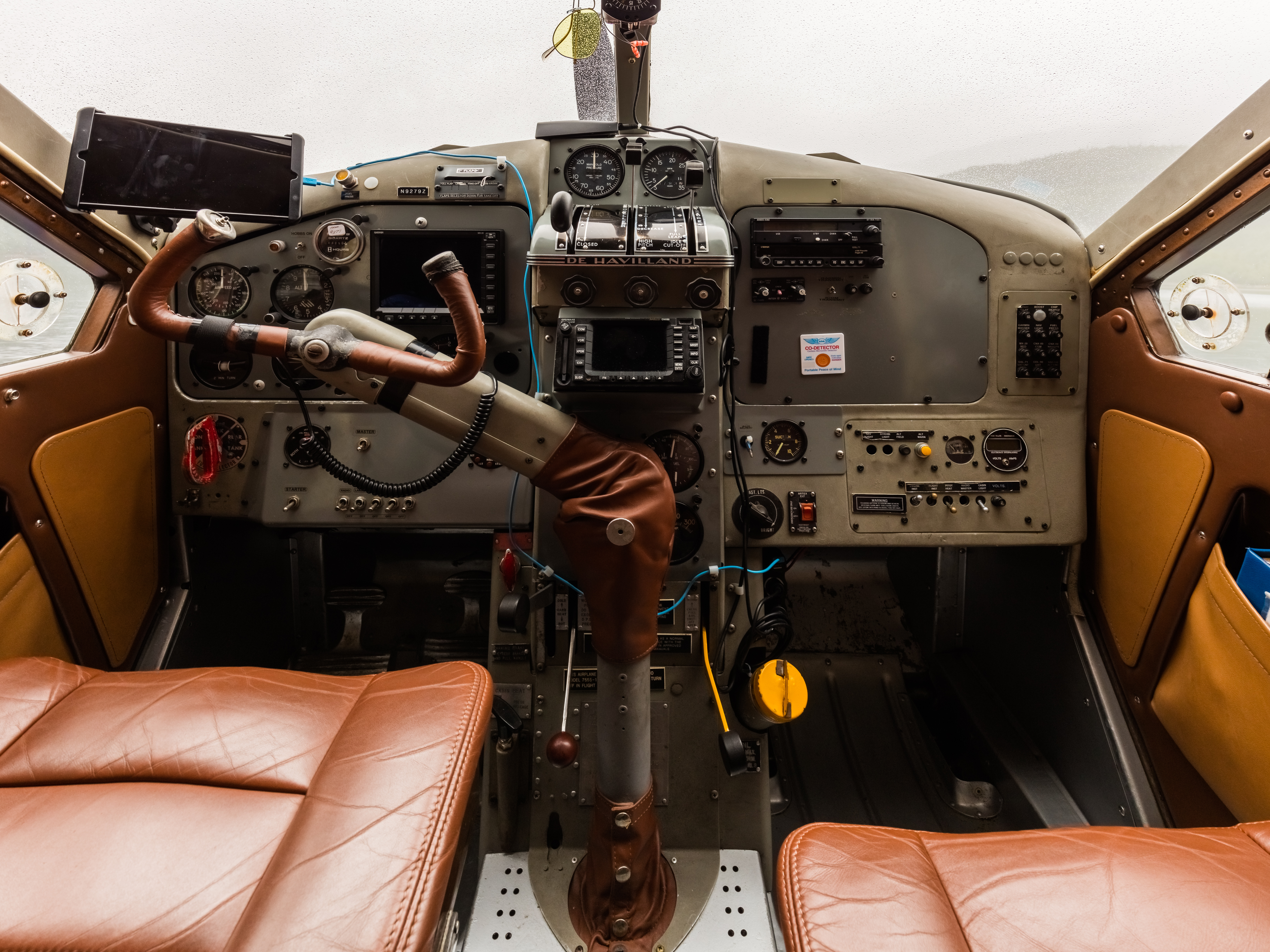
Instrument panel of a DHC-2 – note the single pilot's yoke, which can be handed over to the co-pilot in flight.

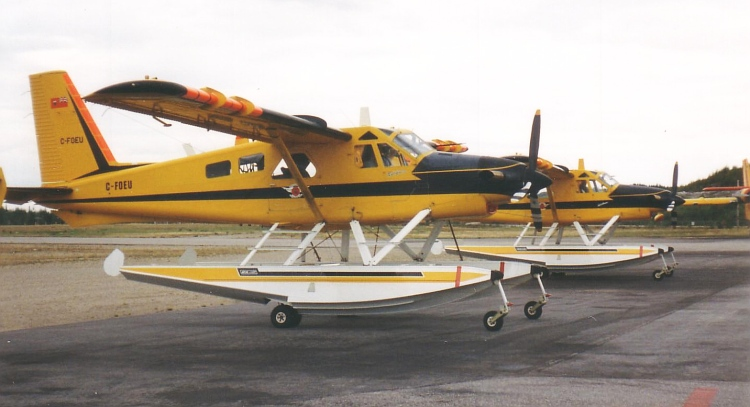
Ontario Ministry of Natural Resources deHavilland DHC-2 Mk 3 Turbo Beavers on amphibious floats in Dryden, Ontario in 1995

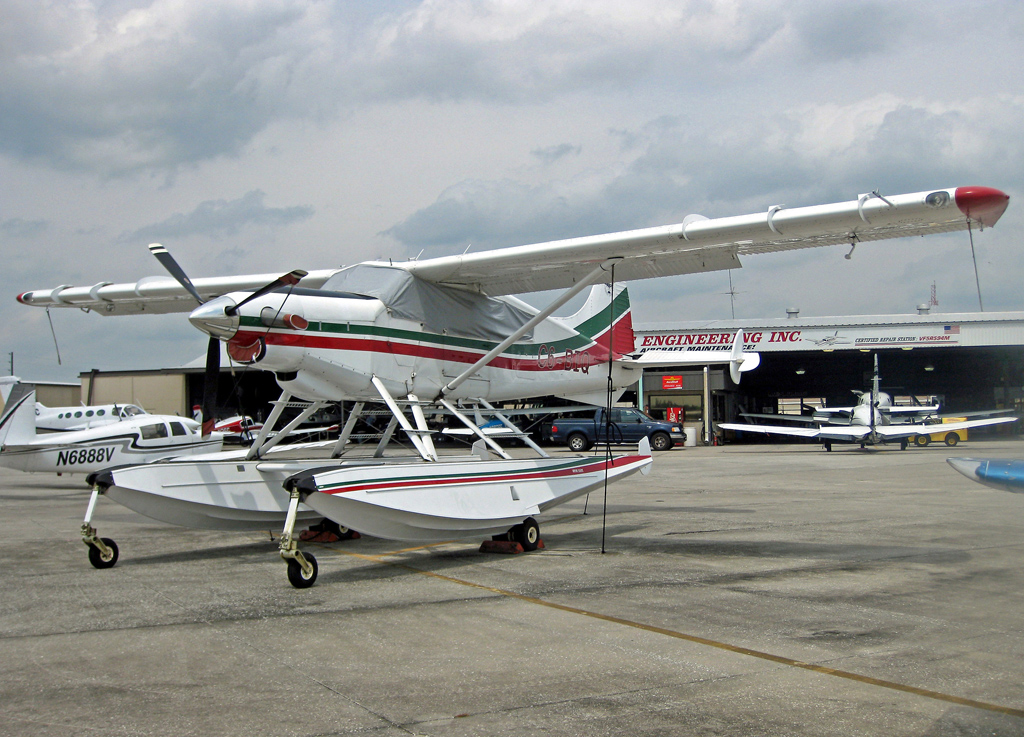
Wipaire Boss Beaver conversion with PT6 turbine engine, retaining original fin shape and fitted with floats, at Bartow Municipal Airport, Florida in 2011

Following the end of the Second World War, de Havilland Canada's management team, recognising that there would be a corresponding downturn in military orders in the immediate post-war climate, decided to focus the company's energies upon finding work within the civilian sector. The company had recently hired Punch Dickins as Director of Sales; Dickins carried out an extensive market research program in the form of requesting and collecting feedback from other pilots, to understand what they needed in a new aircraft. It was on the basis of this information from the prospective operators themselves, as opposed to aerodynamic research or fiscal data, that the future aircraft has its origins.

In response, almost without exception, these pilots specified their desire for tremendous extra power and STOL performance, in a design that could be easily fitted with wheels, skis or floats. When de Havilland engineers noted this would result in poor cruise performance, one pilot replied, "You only have to be faster than a dog sled to be a winner". Other suggestions that were seemingly mundane, but important in the bush plane world, included the installation of full-sized doors on both sides of the aircraft, which meant that it could be readily loaded no matter which side of a dock it tied up on; the doors were also made wide enough to allow for a 44 Imperial gallon drum to be rolled up into the aircraft.

On 17 September 1946, de Havilland officially put together a design team consisting of Fred Buller, Dick Hiscocks, Jim Houston and Wsiewołod Jakimiuk, led by Phil Garratt. The new aircraft was designed to be all-metal (unlike older designs, like the Noorduyn Norseman), using "steel from the engine to the firewall, heavy aluminium truss frames with panels and doors throughout the front seat area, lighter trusses toward the rear and all monocoque construction aft". At the time, de Havilland Canada was still a British-owned company and there were plans to fit the evolving design with the British de Havilland Gipsy engine. As a result of its comparatively limited power, the wing area was greatly increased in order to maintain STOL performance. When Pratt & Whitney Canada offered to supply war-surplus 450 hp (340 kW) Wasp Junior radial engines at a low price, the aircraft ended up with extra power as well as the original long wing. The result was unbeatable STOL performance for an aircraft of its size.

In line with the convention for aircraft produced by de Havilland Canada being named after animals, it was decided that the new bush plane would be named after the beaver, which was known for its hard-working nature. On 16 August 1947, the maiden flight of the DHC-2 Beaver was in Downsview, Ontario; it was flown by Second World War flying ace Russell Bannock. After completing its flight test programme, the prototype received several adjustments and improvements in order for it to serve as a flying demonstration model ready for the sales circuit. The prototype was ultimately sold to Central British Columbia Airways, as a routine day-to-day working air-taxi airplane and continued to fly as such with various air-taxi operators until 1980, after which it was retired and preserved. In April 1948, the first production aircraft was delivered to the Ontario Department of Lands and Forests, who had been a design partner.

=== Production ===
Initial sales were slow, perhaps two or three a month but as the plane was demonstrated sales started to improve. A key event in the Beaver's history occurred the next year when the US Army commenced its search for a new utility aircraft to replace their fleet of Cessnas. The competition quickly boiled down to the Beaver and the Cessna 195. The Beaver won and during the Korean War, the US Army ordered 970, more than half of the overall production run for the type.

Soon, the Beaver grew to become an export success as orders for the type increased from customers around the world. Individual military services of more than 30 different nations would ultimately be included amongst its operators. In later life, as the type was gradually phased out of military service, many examples underwent conversion work so that they could continue to be operated as civilian aircraft instead. During the 1960s, de Havilland developed an improved model of the Beaver, the Mk.III Turbo Beaver, which was equipped with a Pratt & Whitney Canada PT6 turboprop engine. A total of sixty aircraft were built during the late 1960s. In 1967, when production of the type finally ceased, a total of 1,657 DHC-2 Beavers had been constructed.

The Beaver was designed for flight in rugged and remote areas of the world. Its STOL capability made it ideal for areas normally only accessible by canoe or foot. Because the aircraft often flies to remote locations and in cold climates, its oil reservoir filler is located in the cockpit and oil can be filled in flight. A series of upgrades to the basic design were incorporated. One major customer introduced the use of flat steps replacing the earlier tubes, a feature now almost universal. In 1987, the Canadian Engineering Centennial Board named the DHC-2 as one of the top ten Canadian engineering achievements of the 20th century.

=== 1995 to 2024 ===
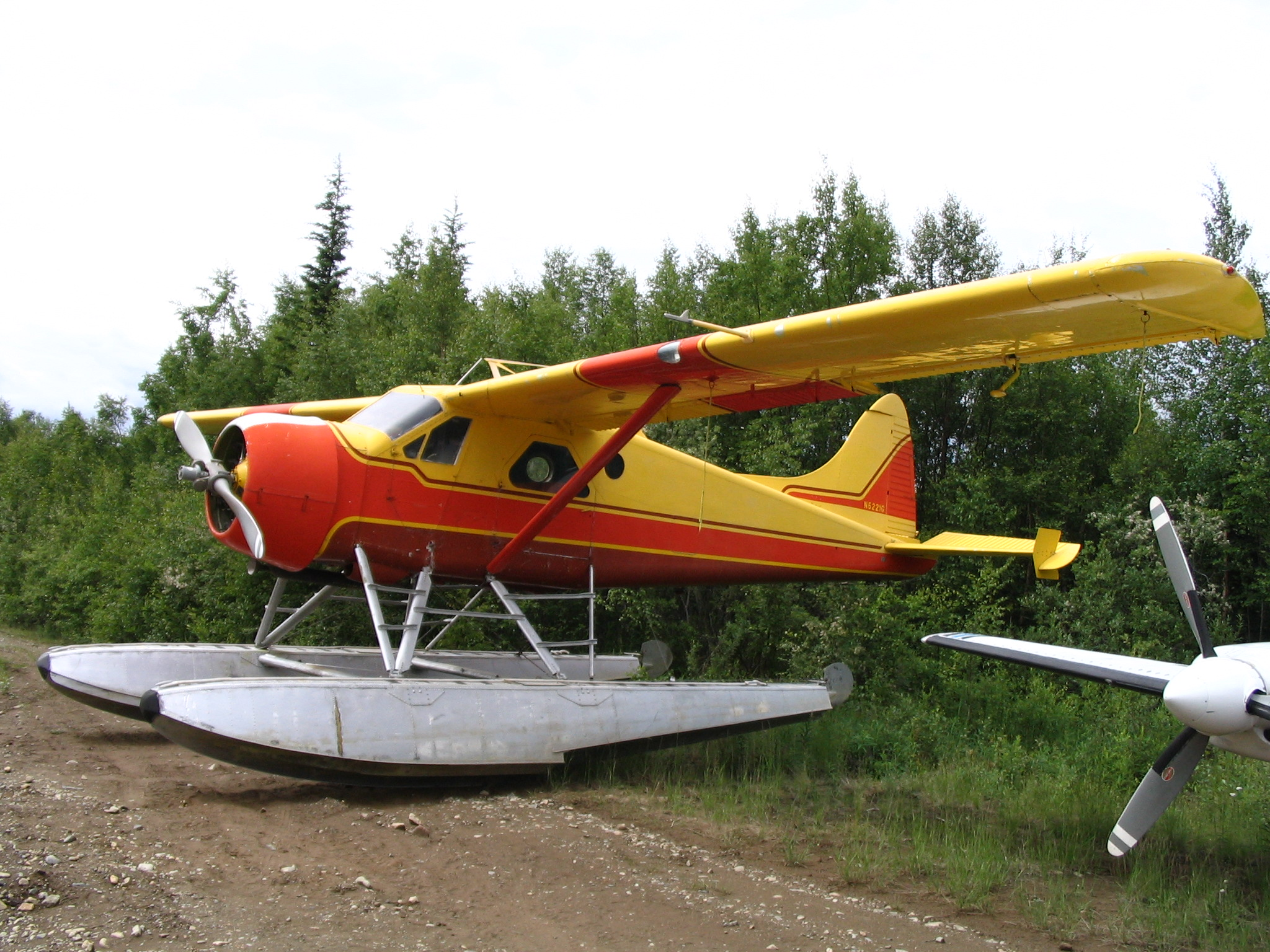
A Beaver on floats

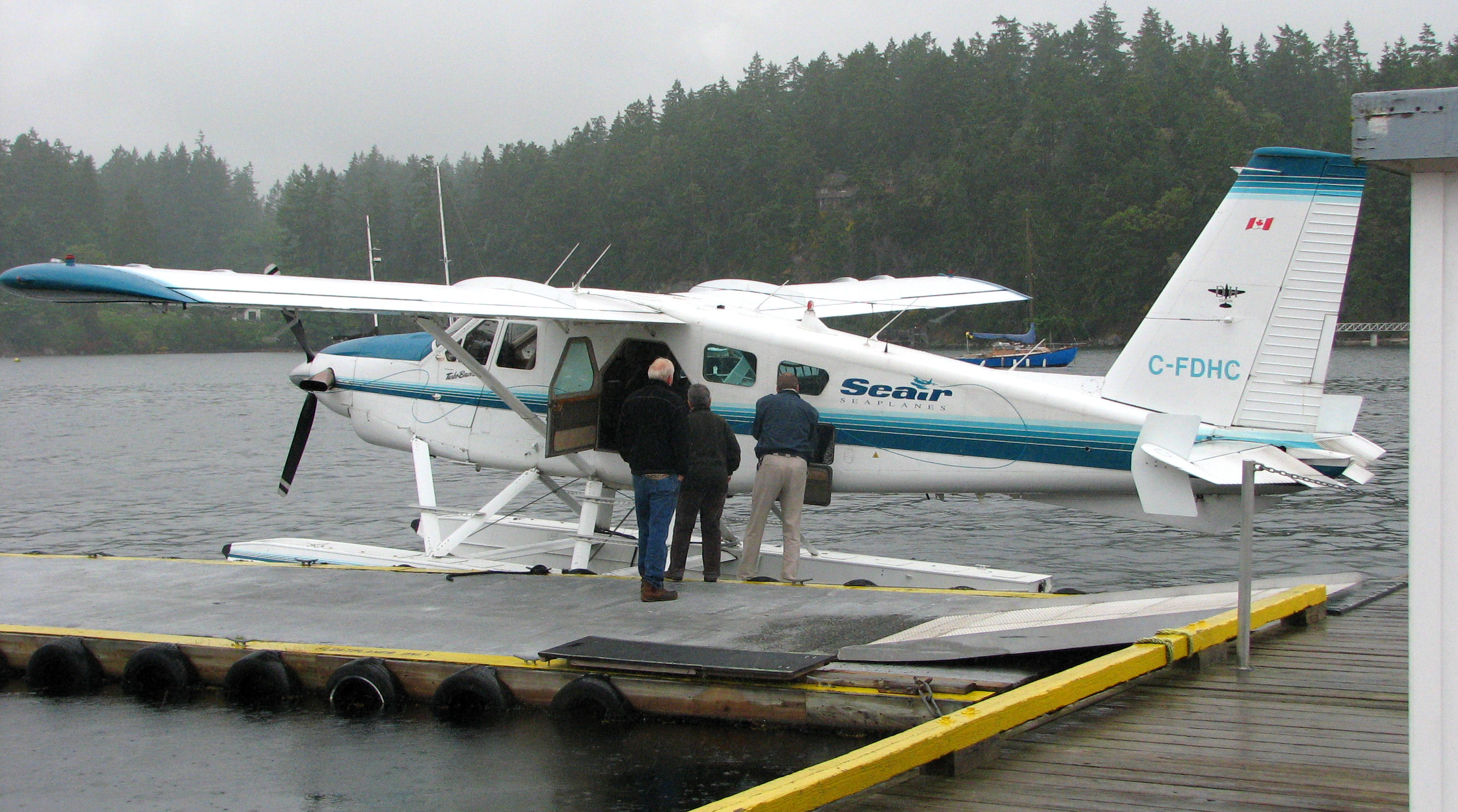
DHC-2 MK. III Turbo Beaver

At one point in its production, plans to license-build the Beaver in New Zealand were proposed. The remaining tooling was purchased by Viking Air of Victoria, British Columbia, Canada, which manufactures replacement parts for most of the early de Havilland line. The company markets and sells the remanufactured DHC-2T Turbo Beaver, an improved variant of the aircraft which has been upgraded with a 680 shp (510 kW) PT6A-34, which enables an increased maximum gross takeoff weight of 6,000 lb (2,700 kg) and the carriage of up to 2,450 lb (1,110 kg) of freight, a roughly 25 per cent increase in usable payload. By August 1995, Viking completed its 30th Turbo Beaver conversion. The firm has also developed and marketed other improvements for the type, such as an advanced wing and modified floats. Other manufacturers have also offered aftermarket upgrades and modifications for the type, such as re-engining programmes by Orenda Aerospace and Wipaire.

On 24 February 2006, Viking purchased the type certificates from Bombardier Aerospace for all the original de Havilland designs, including the Beaver. The ownership of the certificates gives the company the exclusive right to manufacture new aircraft. Viking has stated its interest in the potential restart of production of the Beaver, and commented that, dependent upon market demand, the firm may offer two separate models of the Beaver, one intended to be close to the design of the original batch, and another incorporating various improvements such as new avionics, engines, and doors, as well as likely being stretched to provide increased internal space.

Stolairus Aviation of Kelowna, British Columbia has developed several modifications for the DHC-2 including a STOL Kit which modifies the wing with a contoured leading edge, flap-gap seals, wing fences and drooped wingtips for increased performance. Stolairus has also developed a Wing Angle Kit which changes the incidence of the wing.

Advanced Wing Technologies of Vancouver, British Columbia has developed and certified a new wing for the DHC-2. The FAA Supplemental Type Certificate also raises the aircraft's gross weight to 6,000 lb (2,700 kg). So far, at least two Beavers have been modified in such a manner.

In September 2017 the Transportation Safety Board of Canada recommended stall warning devices be mandated for commercial Beaver operators.

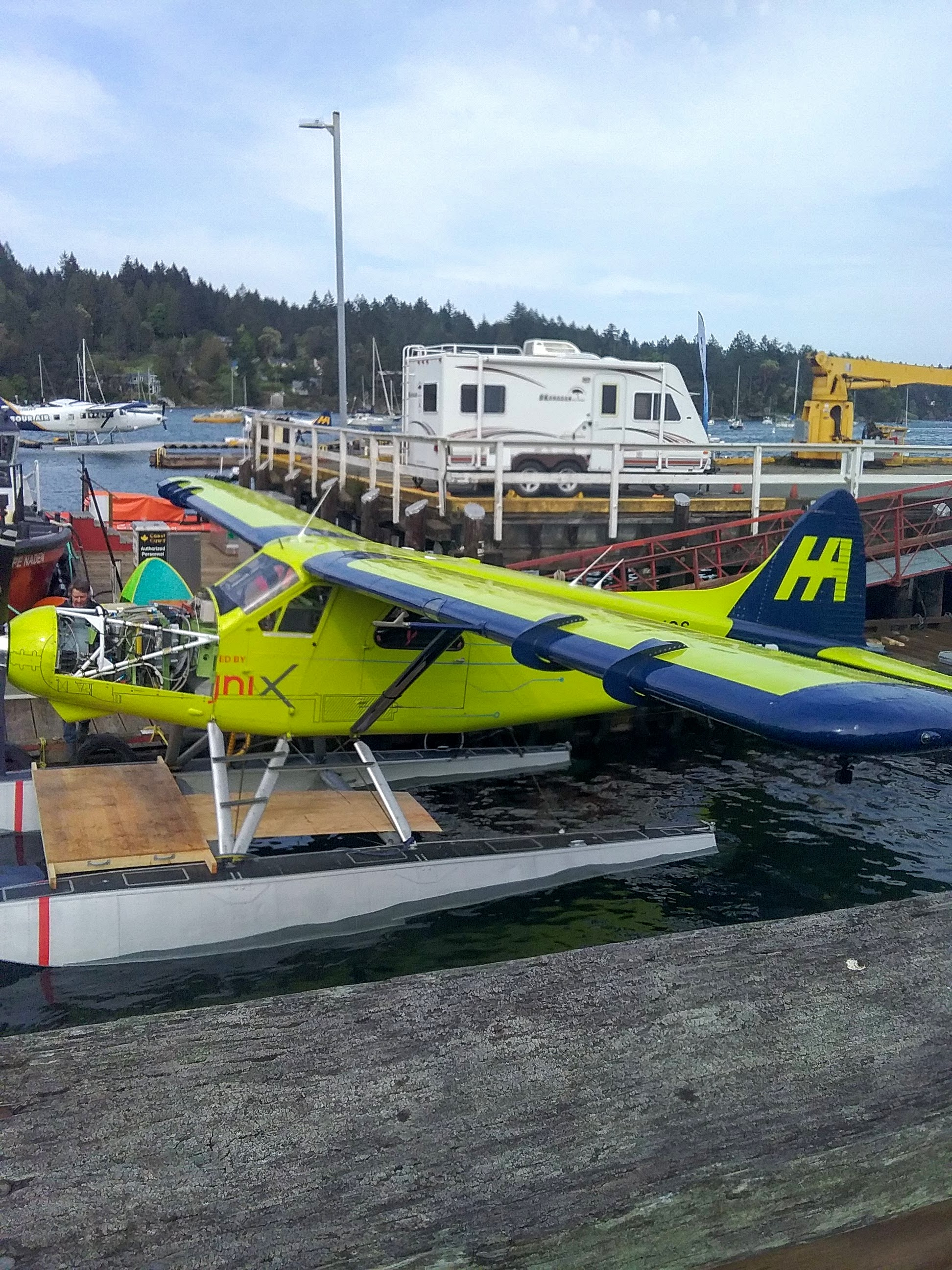
The Harbour Air e-Beaver

In March 2019, Harbour Air announced plans to convert a DHC-2 Beaver to an electric aircraft for development and prototype testing, with aspirational plans to eventually to convert its entire fleet. The first test flight of the aircraft took place in Vancouver in December 2019. By 2024, Harbor Air is anticipating the MagniX motor/battery set being airworthiness certified by Transport Canada by the end of 2026, with a plan to get the eBeaver type-certified by the end of 2027 and able to enter commercial service.

== Design ==
The de Havilland Canada DHC-2 Beaver is a single-engined high-wing propeller-driven STOL aircraft, principally operated as a bush plane and other utility roles, such as cargo and passenger hauling, aerial application (crop dusting and aerial topdressing), and general civil aviation purposes; aviation publication Plane & Pilot described the type as being "arguably the best bush plane ever built". The Beaver was designed to operate in all seasons and the majority of weather conditions; a large proportion were also equipped with floats for buoyancy in water; it reportedly possesses favourable performance characteristics for a floatplane. As a result of its favourable characteristics as a hard working and productive aircraft, the Beaver has had a lengthy service life and many examples have been remanufactured or have otherwise received life extension modifications.

The Beaver is typically powered by a single 450 hp (340 kW) Pratt & Whitney R-985 Wasp Junior radial engine. In order to provide the necessary weight balance for optimal loading flexibility, the engine was mounted as far rearwards as possible, resulting in elements intruding into the cockpit space, such as the oil tank being positioned within the center console between the pilot and copilot's feet and the main fuel tank within the forward belly of the aircraft, which also improves accessibility for replenishment. Many Beavers have had wingtip tanks also installed; careful fuel management between the various fuel tanks is required throughout flights in order to maintain the aircraft's center of gravity. The remanufactured DHC-2T Turbo Beaver is equipped with a 680 shp (510 kW) PT6A-34 turboprop engine.

The Beaver is functionally shaped in order to accommodate a useful and sizable payload, typically close to 2,000 lb (910 kg), even when equipped with floats. While the front doors are narrow, the aft doors are wider, having been designed to facilitate the loading of 45 imperial gallon barrels, either upright or on their sides. The Beaver is considered a 'working' aircraft, which was designed for vigorous use. In addition to cargo, passengers can also be carried; when appropriately fitted out, the Beaver Mk.I can accommodate up to seven passengers while the more spacious Beaver Mk.III can hold a maximum of 11. Various alterations have been approved for use, including alternative seating arrangements, enlarged cargo doors, larger windows and smaller batteries.

During takeoff, both the ailerons and flaps are lowered, which is a relatively uncommon design approach but results in substantially elevated STOL performance. The flaps can be deployed to an extreme range, extending out at full to a 58-degree position; the flight manual notes that the full setting is recommended only for performing emergency landings. In the skies, the Beaver is relatively easy to handle, having been described as possessing light and comfortable controls. Effective application of the rudder is necessary to counteract adverse yaw. It should be flown with a relatively nose-low pitch attitude to maintain airspeed. It is very easy to land, even in moderately rough water.

== Operational history ==
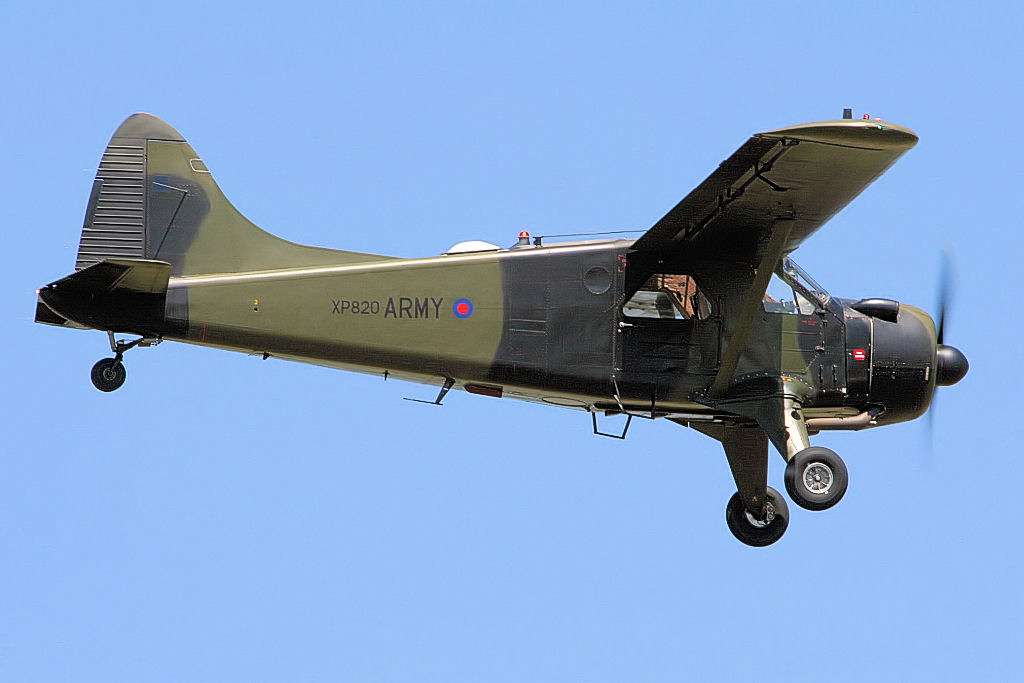
A British Army Beaver flying at RIAT 2006

Despite the fact that production ceased in 1967, hundreds of Beavers are still flying—many of them heavily modified to adapt to changes in technology and needs. Kenmore Air of Kenmore, Washington, provides Beaver and Otter airframes with zero-hour fatigue-life ratings, and owns dozens of supplemental type certificates (STCs) for aircraft modifications. These modifications are so well known and desirable in the aviation community, rebuilt Beavers are often called "Kenmore Beavers" or listed as having "Kenmore mods" installed.

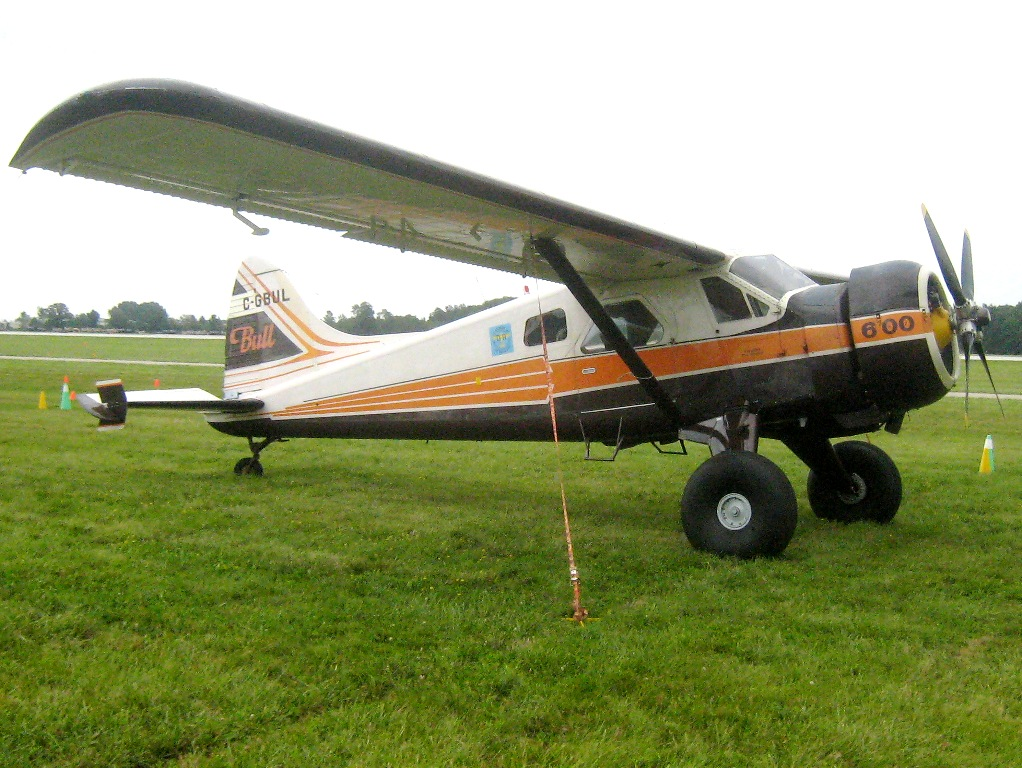
600 hp (447 kW) PZL engine modification

The original Wasp Jr radial engine of the Beaver is long out of production, so repair parts are getting harder to find. Some aircraft conversion stations have addressed this problem by replacing the piston engine with a turboprop engine such as the PT6. The added power and lighter installed weight, together with greater availability of kerosene fuel instead of high-octane aviation gasoline, make this a desirable modification, but at a high cost.

The Beaver was deployed by the British Army Air Corps during the Troubles, at least until 1979, for photo-reconnaissance missions. One of them was hit seven times by machine gun fire in South County Armagh, near the border with the Republic of Ireland in November 1979, while taking photos of an IRA checkpoint. The border crossing where the action took place became known to the British Army as "Beaver Junction".

Operators of significant numbers of piston-Beavers in early 2008 include Air Saguenay and Harbour Air in Canada and Kenmore Air in the US.

American actor Harrison Ford owns a DHC-2 Beaver; he is known for referring to it as being his favourite among his entire fleet of private aircraft.

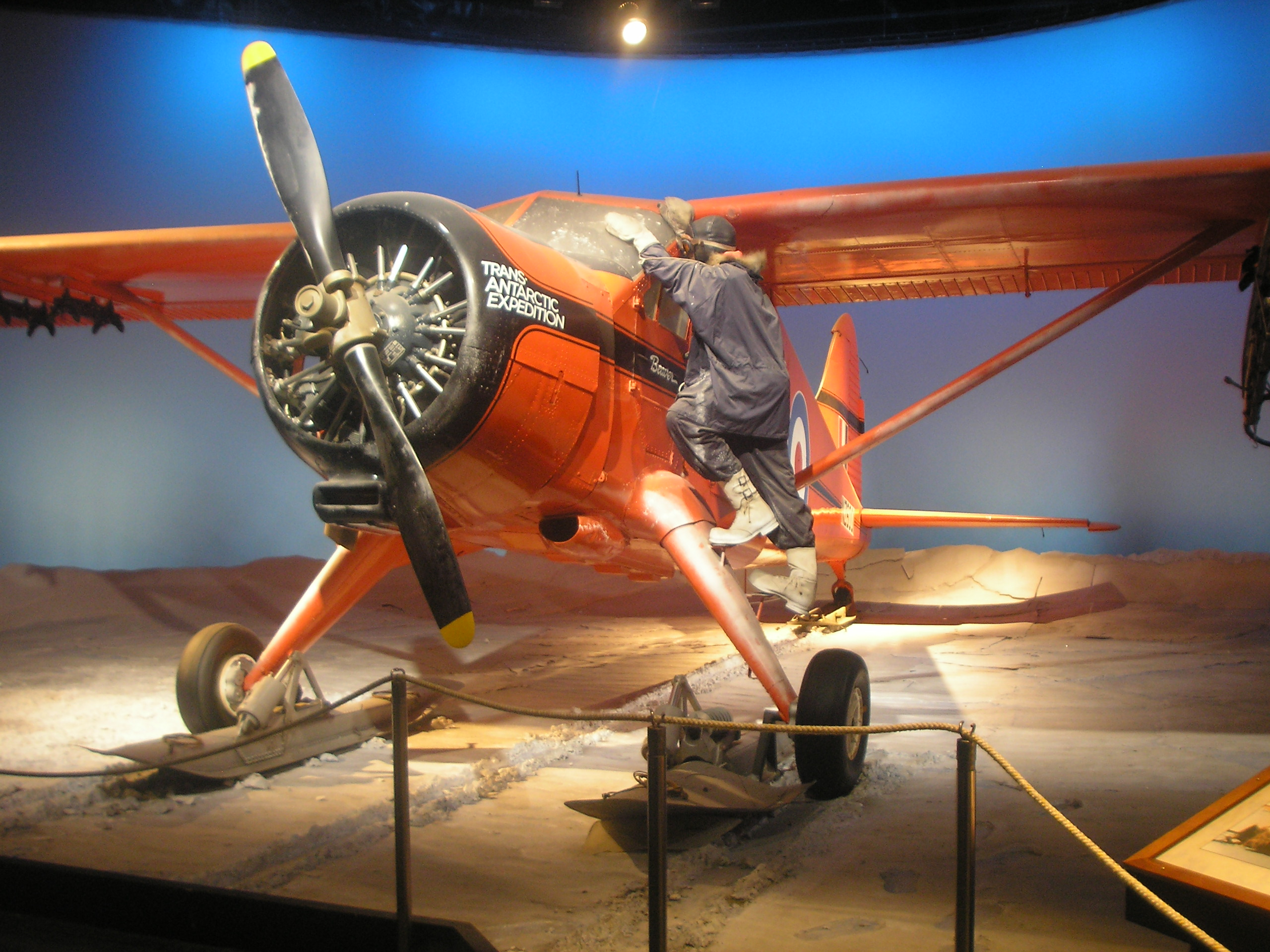
RNZAF Beaver that supported the Commonwealth Trans-Antarctic Expedition

The Civil Air Patrol operated many of the DHC-2 Beaver, where it was commonly used for conducting search and rescue missions. For some decades, the United States Navy has operated a pair of DHC-2s at the United States Naval Test Pilot School, where they are used to instruct students in the evaluation of lateral-directional flying qualities and for the towing of gliders.

In recent years, growing numbers of the type have been used within the leisure industry, being used for pleasure flight and as lifting platforms for skydiving and aerial film activities. The DHC-2 Beaver has been used by skydiving operators due to its good climb rate. When fitted with a roller door that can be opened in flight, it can quickly ferry eight skydivers to 13,000 ft (4,000 m).

== Variants ==
Beaver I
Single-engined STOL utility transport aircraft.
Beaver AL Mk 1
STOL utility transport aircraft for the British Army.
C-127
original designation for DHC-2 aircraft used by the U.S. military, redesignated L-20.
YL-20
Test and evaluation aircraft for the US military.
L-20A Beaver
STOL utility transport aircraft for the U.S. Army, later redesignated U-6A in 1962, 968 built.
L-20B Beaver
Basically similar to the L-20A, but with minor equipment changes. Six were sold to the US Army. Later redesignated U-6B in 1962.
U-6A
US Army L-20A aircraft re-designated
U-6B
US Army L-20B aircraft re-designated
Beaver II
One aircraft was fitted with an Alvis Leonides radial piston engine.
Wipaire Super Beaver
Conversion of surplus US Army and USAF L-20 Beavers.
Wipaire Boss Turbo-Beaver
Turbo conversion fitted with PT-6 but retaining the original lower curved fin shape
Turbo-Beaver III
Powered by a 431 kW (578 ehp) Pratt & Whitney PT6A-6 or -20 turboprop engine.
Airtech Canada DHC-2/PZL-3S
After-market conversion by Airtech Canada in the 1980s, using current-production PZL-3S radial engines of 600 hp (450 kW).
Volpar Model 4000
A 1970s conversion by Volpar, first flown in April 1972 with a modified nose fitted with an AiResearch TPE331-2U-203 turboprop with a three-bladed propeller. Other changes included a new fin and rudder.
Viking DHC-2T Turbo Beaver
Remanufactured Beavers by Viking Air, upgraded with a Pratt & Whitney Canada PT6A-34 680 hp (507 kW) turboprop engine.

== Operators ==
=== Civil ===
The DHC-2 is popular with air charter companies, police forces and small air taxi operators as well as private individuals and companies. Both the Royal Canadian Mounted Police and Finnish Border Guard operate the aircraft. Several small airline companies in British Columbia use Beavers on scheduled routes from Vancouver to the Sunshine Coast, Vancouver Island as well as numerous nearby smaller islands. The largest of these airlines is Harbour Air.

=== Military operators ===
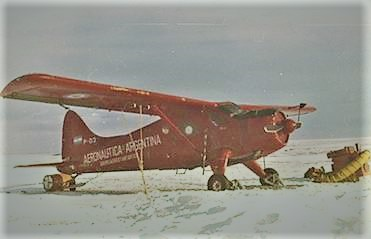
Argentine Air Force Beaver in Antarctica

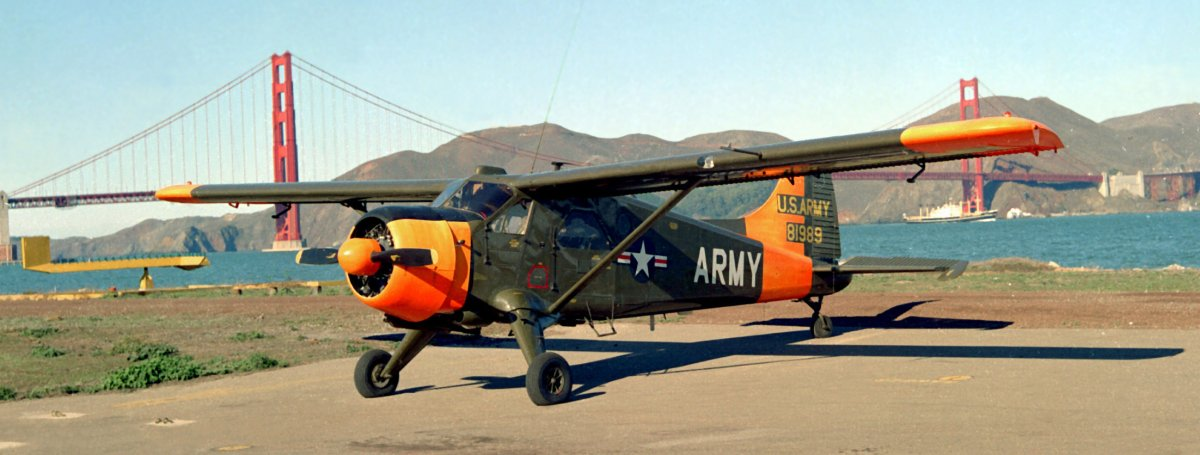
U.S. Army example

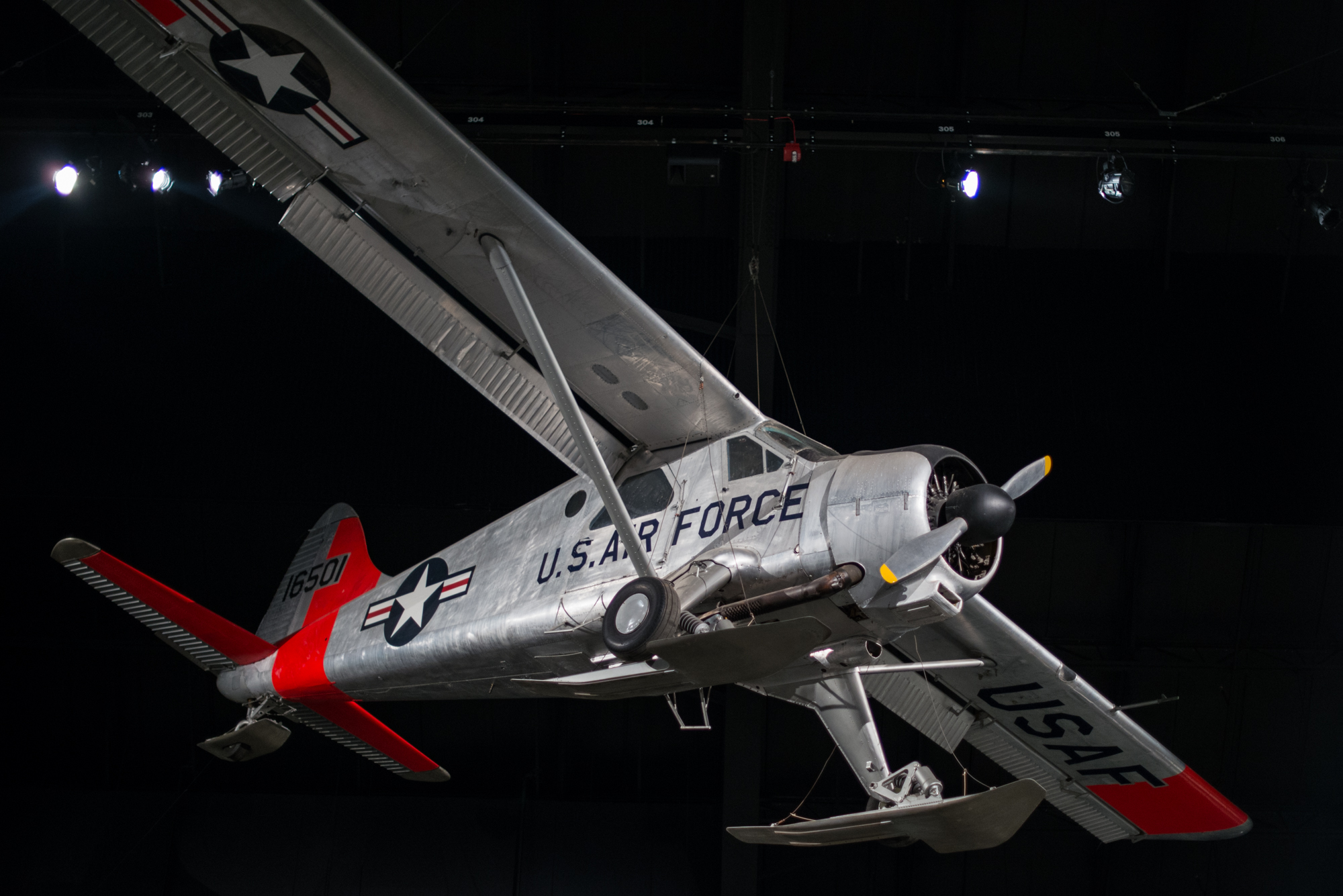
U-6A Beaver at the National Museum of the United States Air Force

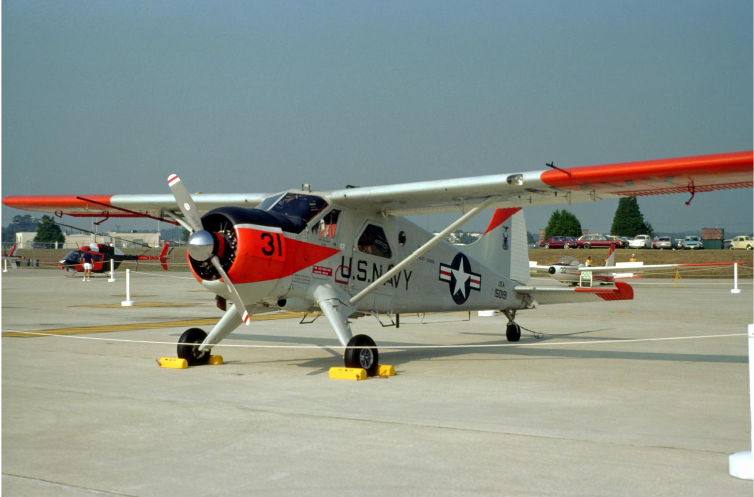
U-6A Beaver aircraft on display

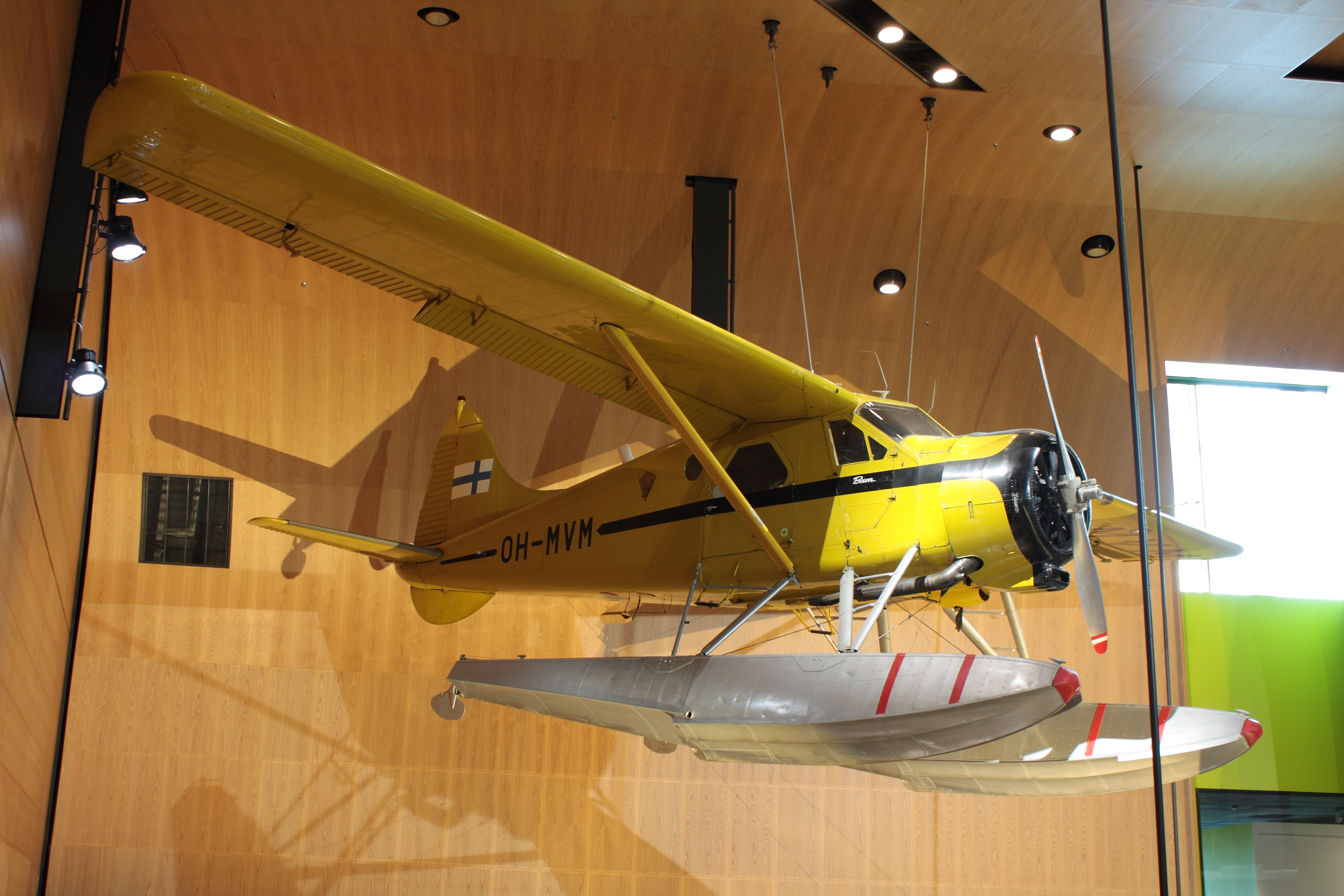
DHC-2 Beaver OH-MVM in Maritime Centre Vellamo in Kotka, Finland

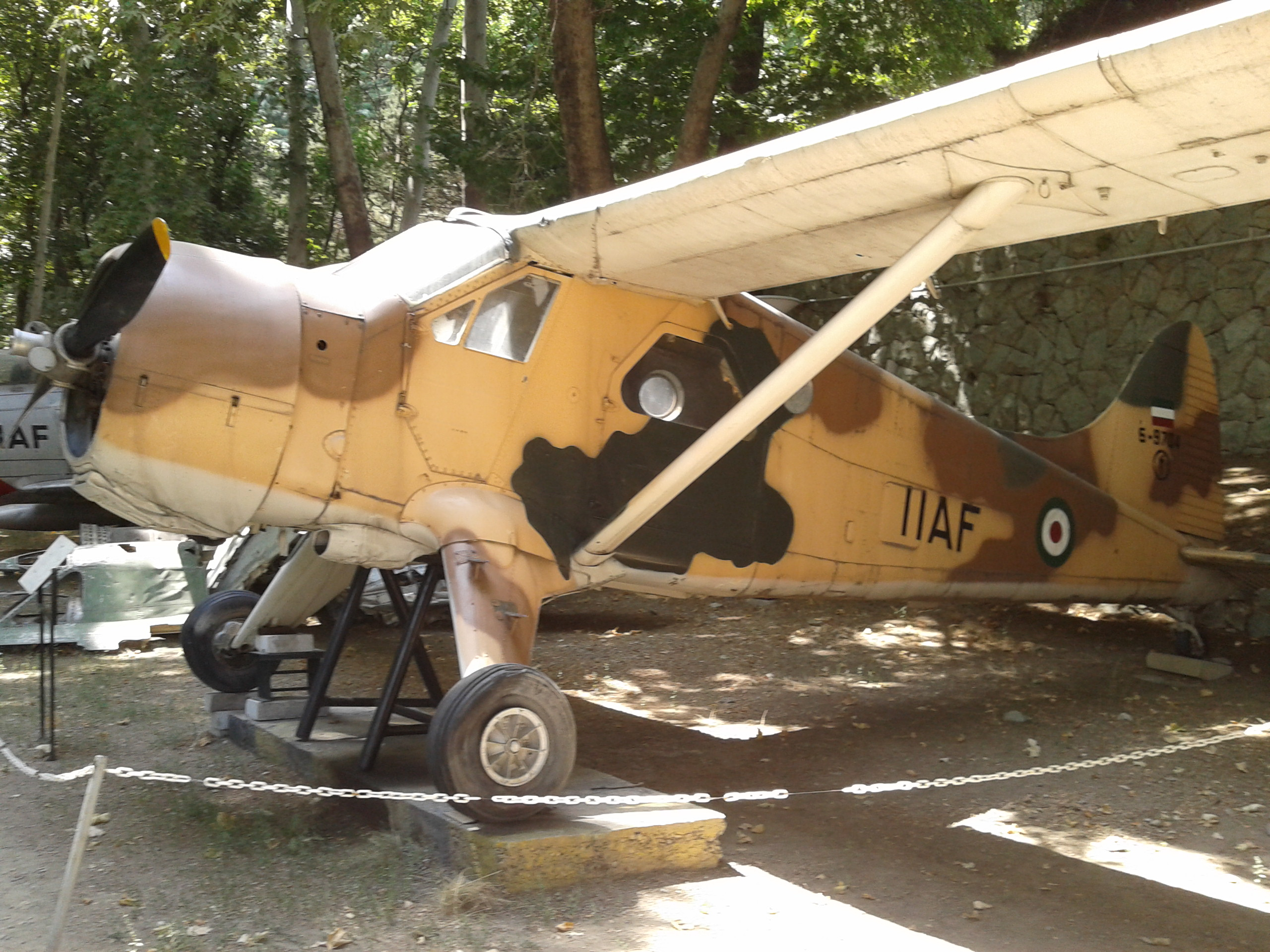
IIAF DHC-2 Beaver in Saadabad Museum in Tehran, Iran

Argentina

- Argentine Air Force
- Argentine Naval Aviation

Australia

- Royal Australian Air Force – Five in service 1955–1964.
  - Antarctic Flight RAAF
  - No. 1 Air Trials Unit

Austria

- Austrian Air Force

Burma

- Burma Air Force

Cambodia

- Royal Cambodian Air Force – received three L-20s from the United States in the late 1950s.

Chile

- Chilean Air Force

Taiwan

- Republic of China Air Force

Colombia

- Colombian Air Force

Cuba

- Fuezas Aéreas Ejército de Cuba (pre Cuban Revolution) operated at least eight.
- Cuban Air Force (post Cuban Revolution)

Dominican Republic

- Dominican Air Force

Finland

- Finnish Air Force
- Finnish Border Guard

France

- French Air Force

Ghana

- Ghana Air Force - acquired 14 Beavers, in service 1960–1984.

Greece

- Greek Air Force
- Greek Army

Haiti

- Haiti Air Corps

Indonesia

- Indonesian Air Force
- Indonesian Army

Pahlavi Iran

- Imperial Iranian Air Force

Kenya

- Kenya Air Force (in operation 1964–1983)

Laos

- Royal Lao Air Force

Netherlands

- Royal Netherlands Air Force

New Zealand

- Royal New Zealand Air Force

Oman

- Royal Air Force of Oman

Panama

- Panamanian Public Forces

Paraguay

- Paraguayan Air Force 4 U-6A donated by MAP in 1975

Peru

- Peruvian Air Force

Philippines

- Philippine Air Force
- Philippine Navy- 3 Units De Havilland L-20 (U-6A) Beavers in 1960

Federation of South Arabia

- Federation of South Arabian Air Force

South Korea

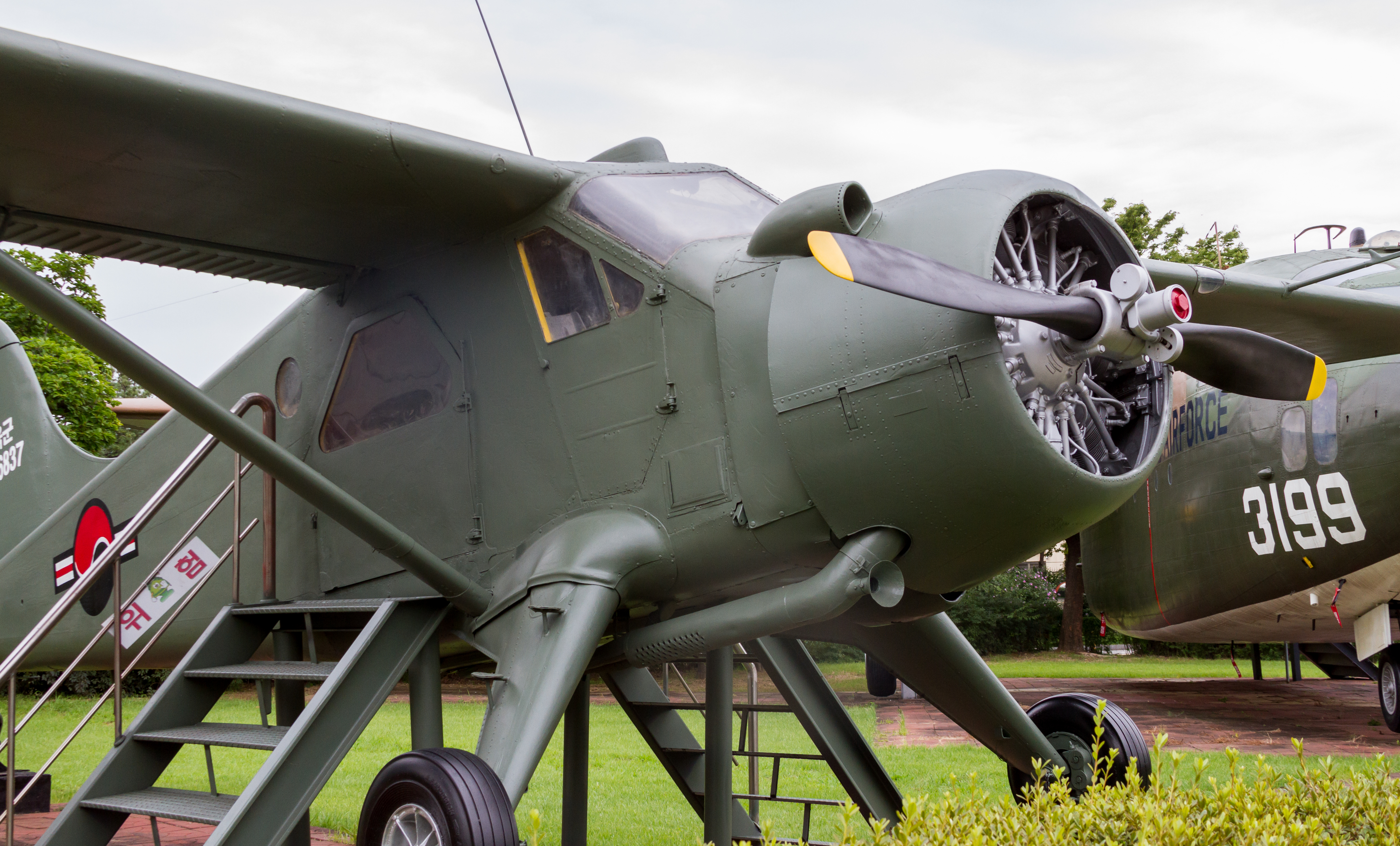
A U-6 Beaver on display at the War Memorial of Korea

- Republic of Korea Air Force

South Vietnam

- Republic of Vietnam Air Force

South Yemen

- South Yemen Air Force

Thailand

- Royal Thai Army

Turkey

- Turkish Army

Uganda
United Kingdom

- Army Air Corps - 46 x Beaver AL.1.

United States

- Civil Air Patrol
- United States Army
- United States Air Force
- United States Navy- 2 Units in 2024.

Yugoslavia

- SFR Yugoslav Air Force

Zambia

- Zambian Air Force. Retired.

== Accidents and incidents ==
As of August 2023, there have been 351 incidents involving the DHC-2 and 739 deaths. A select few are listed:

- 22 November 1964 - Five United States Air Force missile crew members and the pilot died when their U-6A (DHC-2) crashed into a light pole and burned near Nebraska City, NE. The plane, flying a routine support mission, had just delivered the relief crew to Atlas Site Number 4 of the 551st Strategic Missile Squadron and was returning the off-going crew to Lincoln AFB, NE. Crash of 52-6108 | Aviation in Nebraska (wordpress.com)
- 19 June 2000 – A de Havilland Canada DHC-2 Beaver floatplane crashes on takeoff from Nipmo Lake in British Columbia, Canada, killing three of the 7 people aboard. One of the dead is political cartoonist and caricaturist, book author and illustrator, and watercolourist William Papas, who drowns while trying to swim to shore in 40-degree F (4.5-degree C) water.
- 31 December 2017 – High-profile UK business leader Richard Cousins, four members of his family and a Canadian pilot died in the 2017 Sydney Seaplanes crash.

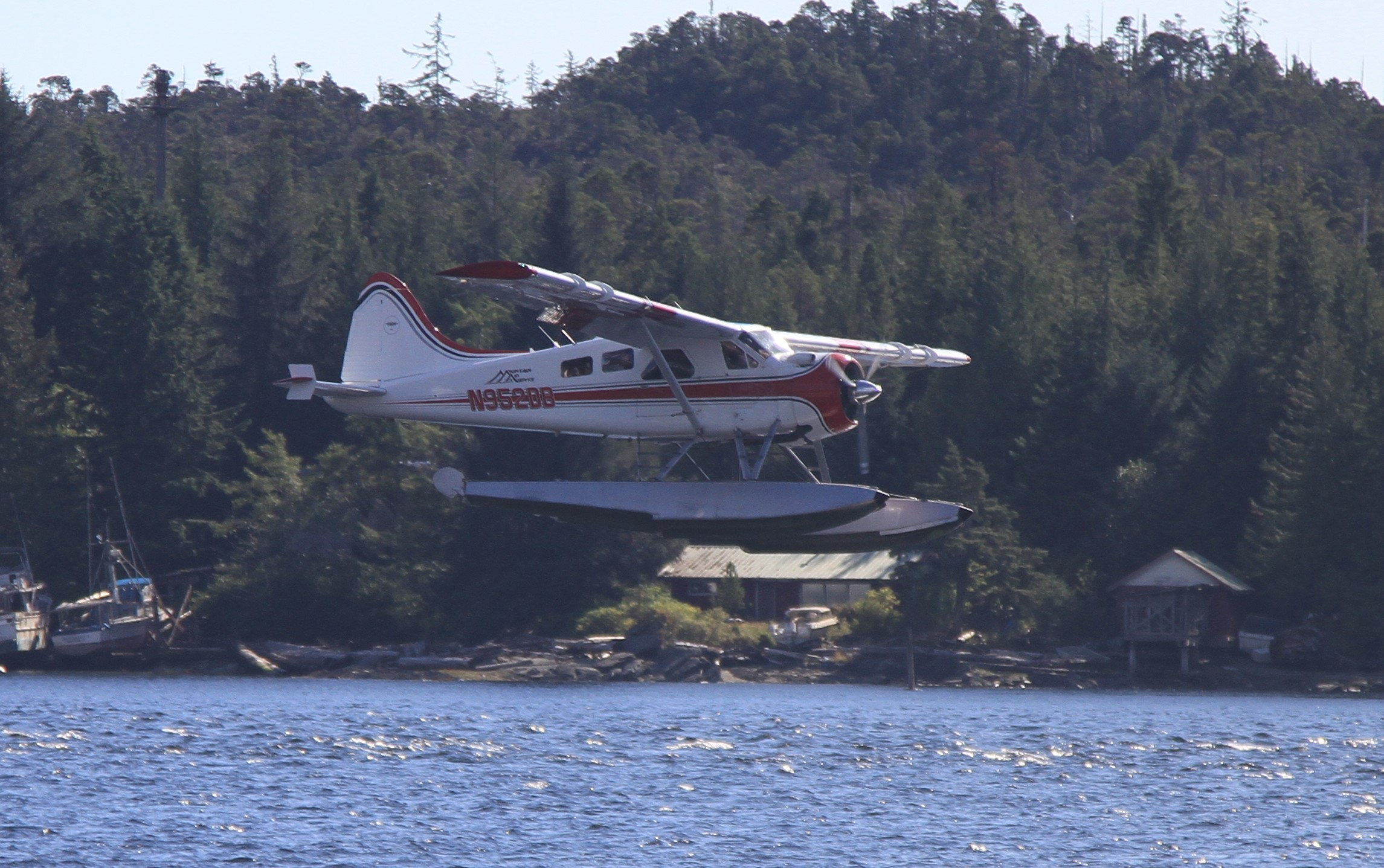
N952DB, the DHC-2 destroyed in the 2019 Alaska mid-air collision, seen in 2015

- 4 August 2018 - K2 Aviation, a DHC-2, crashed into a mountain, killing all five aboard.
- 13 May 2019 – A Mountain Air Service DHC-2 and a Taquan Air de Havilland DHC-3 Turbine Otter collided over George Inlet, killing all five aboard the DHC-2 and one aboard the DHC-3.
- 20 May 2019 – Taquan Air Flight 20 overturned in the harbor in Metlakatla, Alaska, United States one week after the George Inlet crash, killing the pilot and single passenger. Taquan Air suspended all flights the following day.
- 31 July 2020 – A DHC-2 carrying 6 people collided with a Piper PA-12 Super Cruiser piloted by Alaska State Representative Gary Knopp (the only one aboard) over Alaska's Kenai Peninsula. All 7 people died.

== Aircraft on display ==
=== Argentina ===
- P-05 – DHC-2 on static display at Museo Nacional de Aeronáutica de Argentina in Morón, Buenos Aires.

=== Bangladesh ===
- S2-ABR – DHC-2 preserved outside the National Museum of Science and Technology in Dhaka.
- S2-ABV – DHC-2 preserved outside the National Museum of Science and Technology in Dhaka.

=== Canada ===
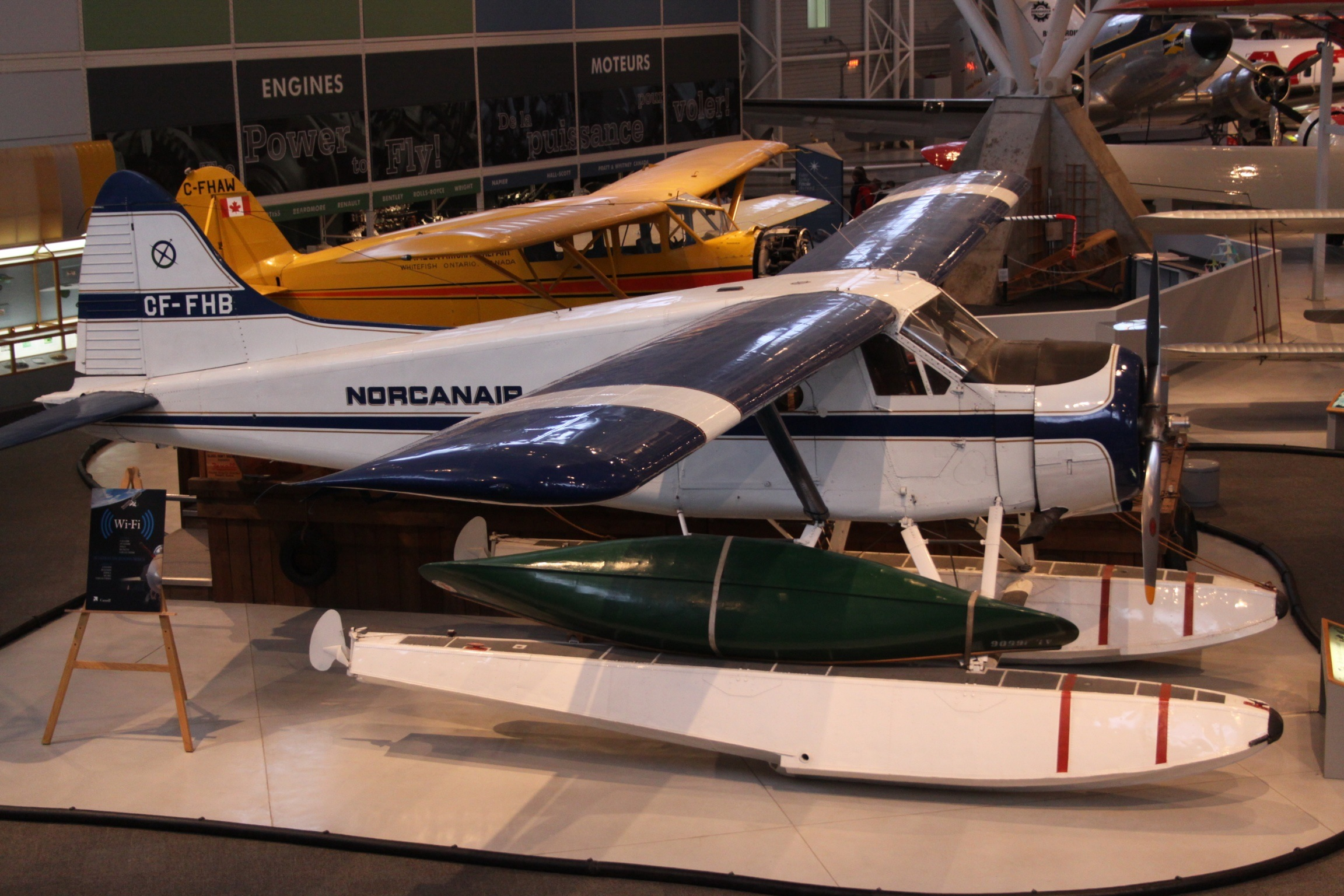
DHC-2 Beaver c/n 1 at Canada Aviation and Space Museum

- CF-FHB – DHC-2 on static display at the Canada Aviation and Space Museum in Ottawa, Ontario. This is the first DHC-2 built.
- CF-OBS – DHC-2 on display at the Canadian Bushplane Heritage Centre in Sault Ste. Marie, Ontario.
- AP-AKB – DHC-2 in storage at Canada Aviation and Space Museum in Ottawa.
- CF-PSM-X – Turbo-Beaver III on display at the Canadian Bushplane Heritage Centre in Sault Ste. Marie, Ontario.
- Composite – DHC-2 on static display at Bass Pro Shops at Vaughan Mills in Vaughan, Ontario. It is a composite airframe consisting of parts from construction number 1579.
- CF-MAA - DHC-2 on display at the Royal Aviation Museum of Western Canada in Winnipeg, Manitoba

=== China ===
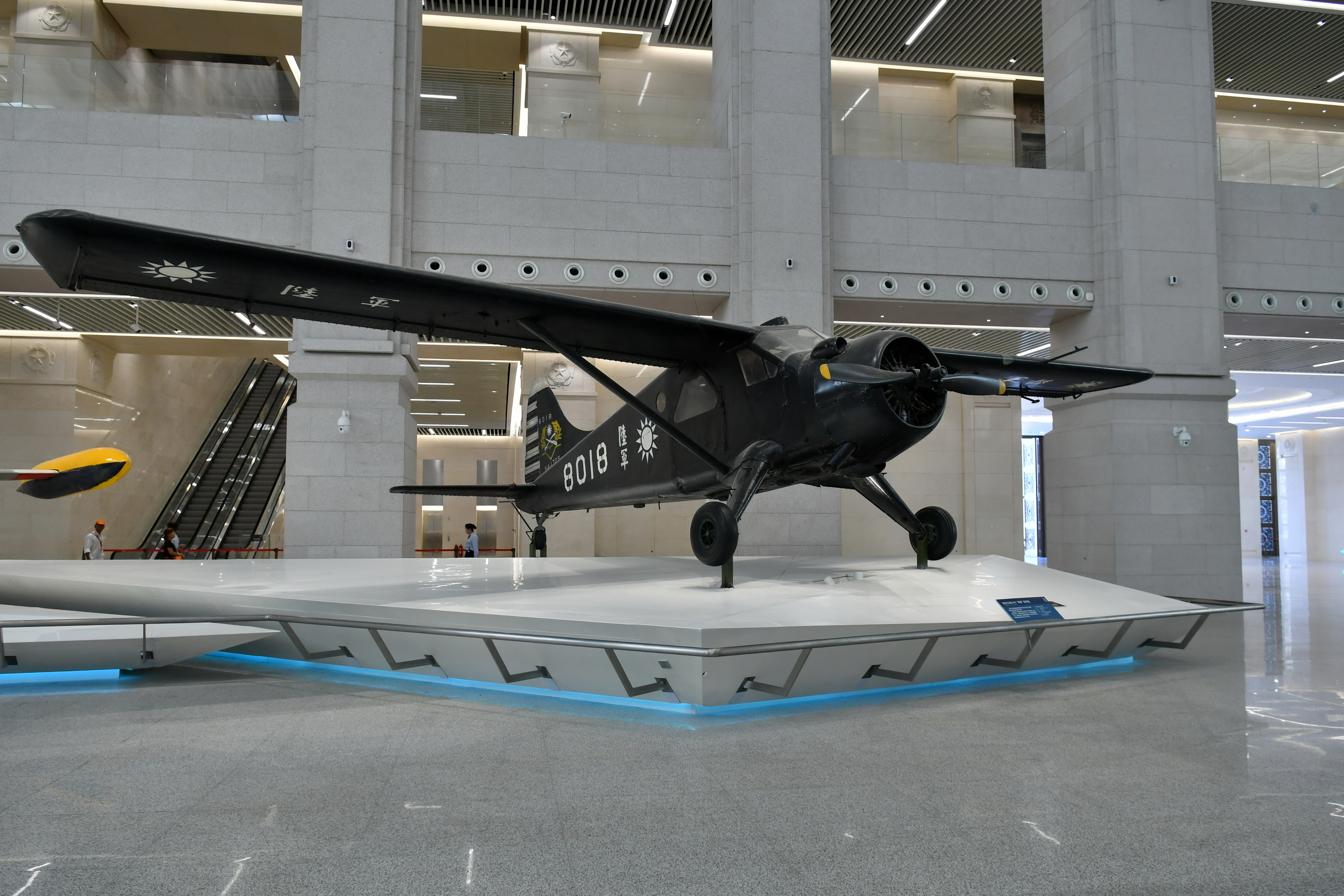
Defected ROCAF U-6A on display in Beijing

- 54-1725 (United States Army) U-6A on static display at the Military Museum of the Chinese People's Revolution in Beijing.
- 1619 (Unmarked) – DHC-2 on static display at the Chinese Aviation Museum in Datangshan, Beijing.

=== Colombia ===
- 408 – DHC-2 on static display at the Colombian Aerospace Museum near Tocancipá, Cundinamarca.

=== Finland ===
- OH-MVL – DHC-2 on static display at the Finnish Aviation Museum in Vantaa, Uusimaa.
- OH-MVM – DHC-2 on static display at the Maritime Centre Vellamo in Kotka, Kymenlaakso, Finland.

=== Indonesia ===
- U-3033 (Indonesian Army Aviation) – DHC-2 on static display at SMK Penerbangan Wira Aqasa Bhakti, Semarang, Central Java.

=== Iran ===
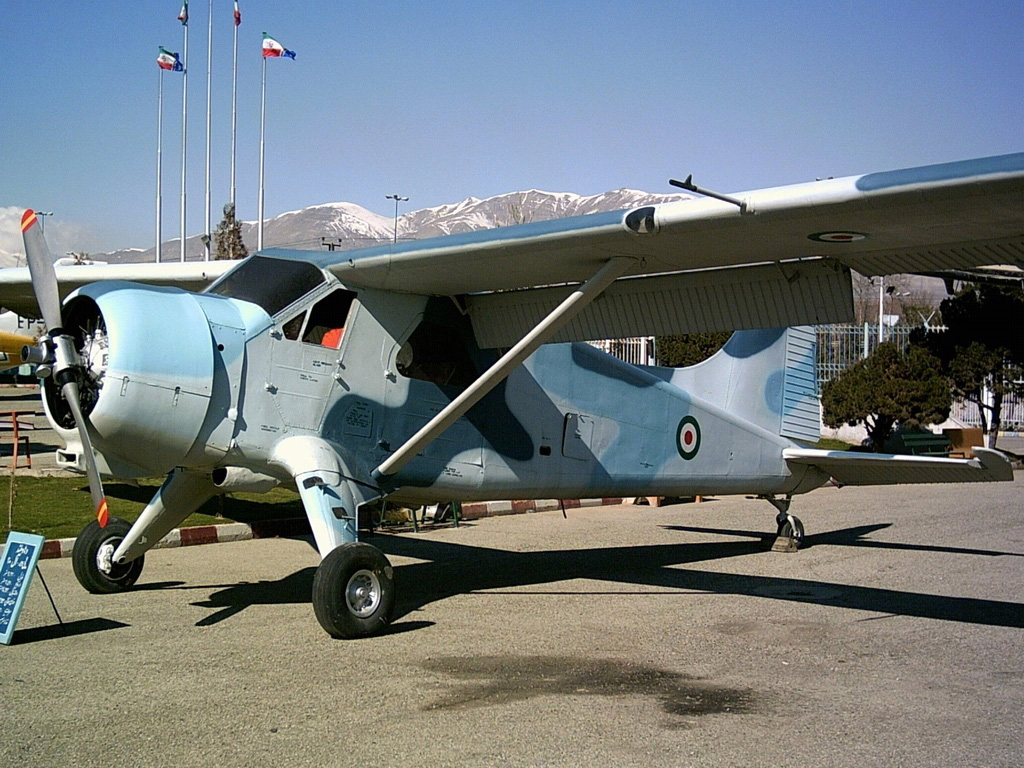
IRIAF L-20B at Mehrabad International Airport in Tehran

- 6-9701 – L-20B on static display at The Military Museum, Sa'dabad Complex in Tehran.
- 6-9704 – L-20B on static display at Tehran Aviation Exhibition near Mehrabad International Airport.

=== Japan ===
- JA3097 – DHC-2 on static display at Chunichi Shimbun Headquarters in Nagoya.

=== Netherlands ===
- S-6 – L-20 in storage at the Militaire Luchtvaart Museum in Soesterberg, Utrecht, Netherlands.
- JZ-PAD – DHC-2 on display at Aviodrome in Lelystad, Flevoland. Only front part of the fuselage is displayed.

=== New Zealand ===
- ZK-CMW – DHC-2 on static display at the Air Force Museum of New Zealand in Wigram, Canterbury. It is painted as NZ6001, an airframe that took part in the Trans-Antarctic Expedition.

=== Oman ===
- 213 – Beaver AL.1 on static display at the Sultan's Armed Forces Museum near Muscat.

=== Serbia ===
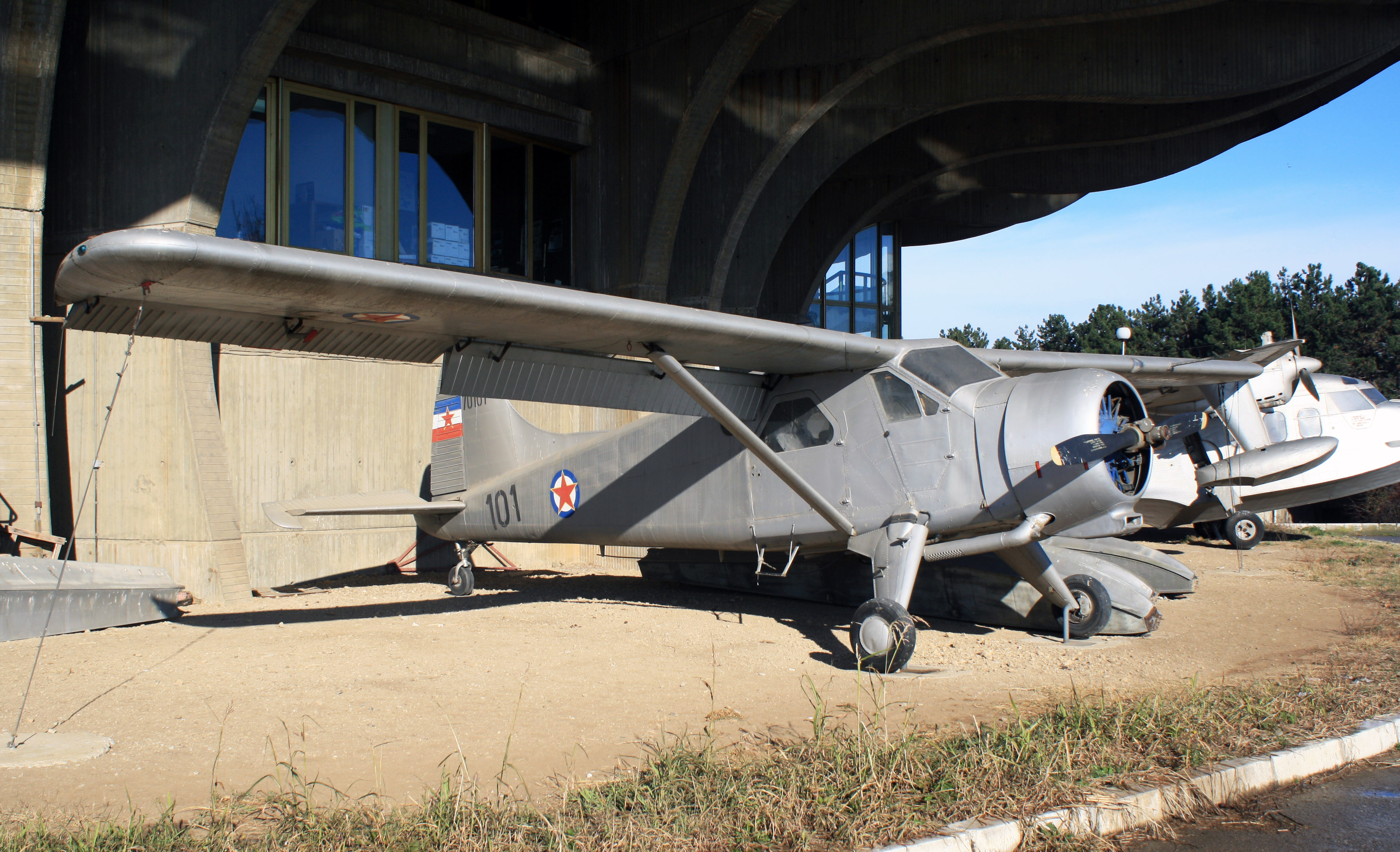
DHC-2 of Yugoslav Air Force in Belgrade

- 70101 – DHC-2 on static display at the Belgrade Aviation Museum in Surčin, Belgrade.

=== South Korea ===
- 116772 – U-6A on static display at a museum in Imjingak, Gyeonggi Province.
- 116837 – U-6A on static display at War Memorial of Korea, Seoul.
- 82073 (painted as "58600") – U-6A on static display at Daejeon National Cemetery, Daejeon.

=== Taiwan ===
- 8025 – U-6A on static display at Kueijen Army Airfield, Taoyuan City.
- 8011 – U-6A on static display at Aviation Education Exhibition Hall near Republic of China Air Force Academy in Kaohsiung City.

=== Thailand ===
- 26157 – L-20A on static display at Royal Thai Army Aircraft Maintenance Centre, Lopburi.

=== United Kingdom ===
- 58-2062 (United States Army) – U-6A on static display at the Midland Air Museum in Baginton, Warwickshire.
- XP821 – Beaver AL.1 on static display at the Museum of Army Flying at AAC Middle Wallop in Middle Wallop, Hampshire.
- XP822 – Beaver AL.1 on static display at the Museum of Army Flying at AAC Middle Wallop in Middle Wallop, Hampshire.

=== United States ===
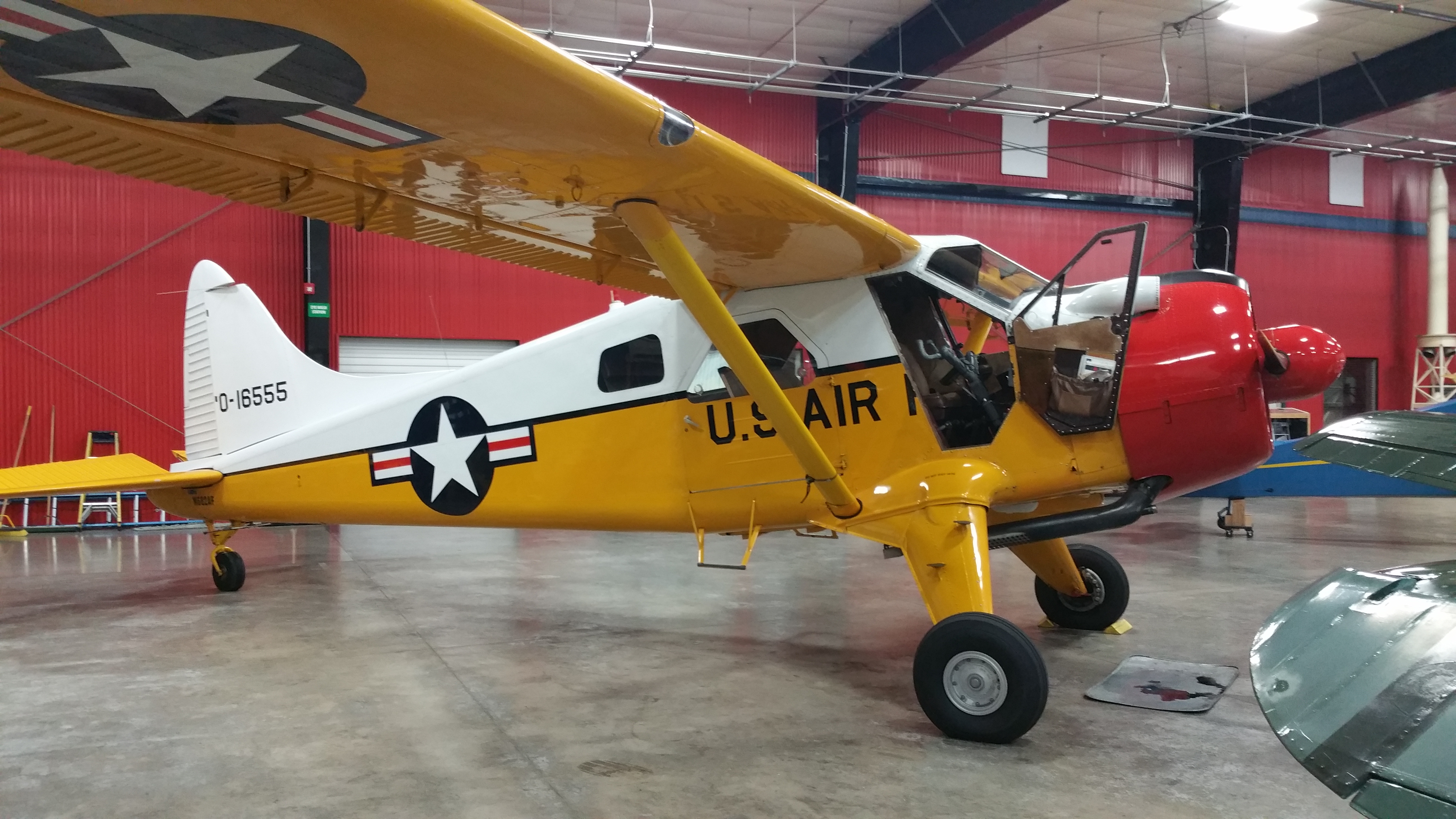
U-6A c/n 1163 at the Heritage Flight Museum

- 51-6263 – U-6A on static display at the United States Army Aviation Museum at Fort Novosel near Daleville, Alabama.
- 51-16501– U-6A on static display at the National Museum of the U.S. Air Force at Wright-Patterson Air Force Base in Dayton, Ohio.
- 52-6087 – U-6A on static display at the Museum of Aviation at Robins Air Force Base near Warner Robins, Georgia.
- 53-2817 – U-6A on static display at Camp San Luis Obispo in San Luis Obispo County, California.
- 53-0367 – U-6A on static display at the 45th Infantry Division Museum in Oklahoma City, Oklahoma.
- N754 – Volpar Model 4000 on display at Ted Stevens Anchorage International Airport, Alaska.
- 57-2570 – U-6A in storage at the New England Air Museum in Windsor Locks, Connecticut.
- 58-1997 – U-6 on static display at the U.S. Army Transportation Museum at Joint Base Langley–Eustis near Newport News, Virginia.
- 58-2064 – U-6 in storage at the National Infantry Museum in Columbus, Georgia.

== Specifications (DHC-2) ==
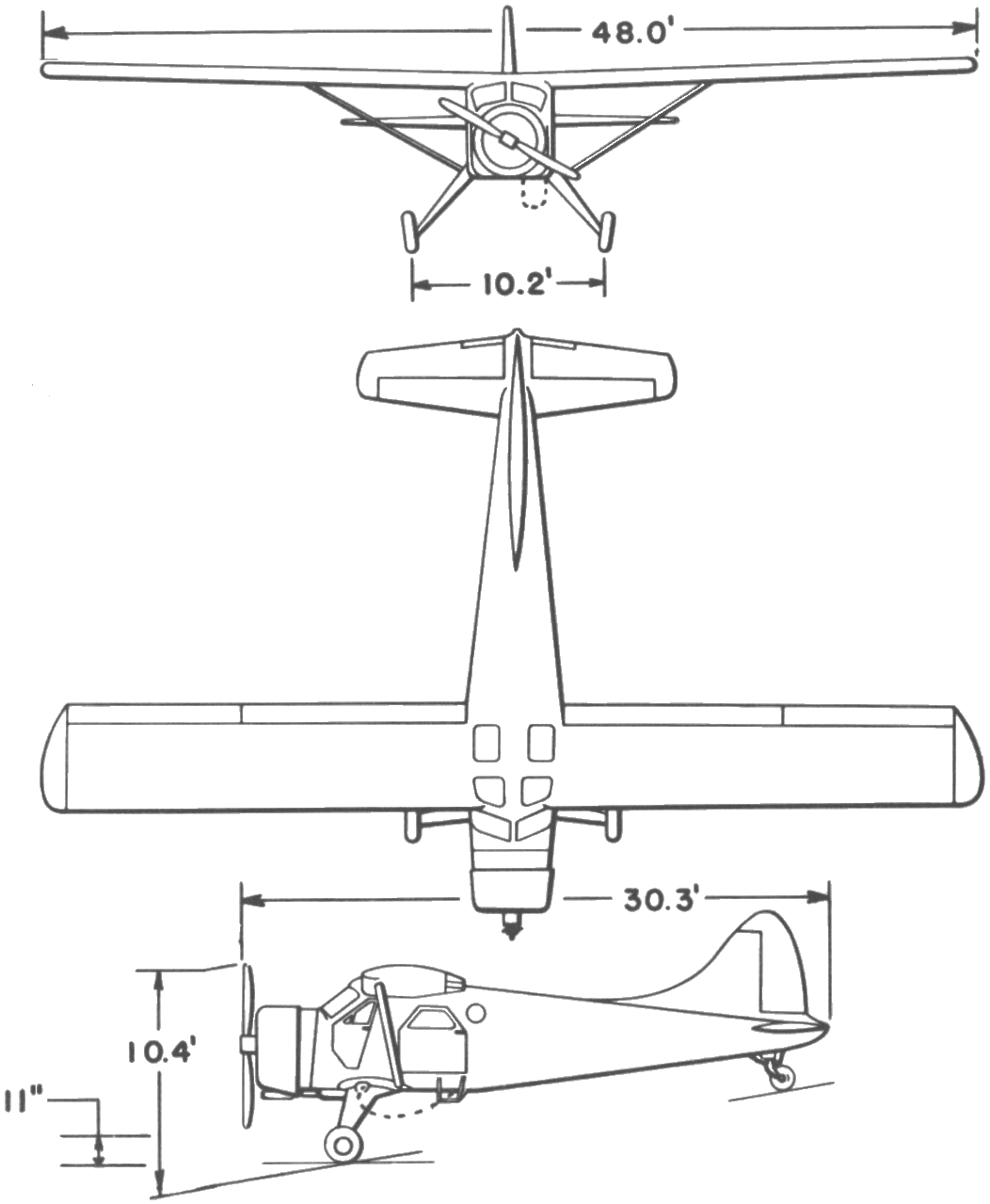
3-view line drawing of the de Havilland Canada L-20A Beaver

Data from The Encyclopedia of World Aircraft, BAE Systems

General characteristics

- Crew: 1 - 2
- Capacity: 6 passengers, 2,100 lb (953 kg) useful load
- Length: 30 ft 3 in (9.22 m)
- Wingspan: 48 ft 0 in (14.63 m)
- Height: 9 ft 0 in (2.74 m)
- Wing area: 250 sq ft (23 m^{2})
- Airfoil: D.H. high lift wing section
- Empty weight: 3,000 lb (1,361 kg)
- Gross weight: 5,100 lb (2,313 kg)
- Fuel capacity: 79 imp gal (95 US gal; 360 L)
- Powerplant: 1 × Pratt & Whitney R-985 Wasp Jr. 9 cylinder radial engine, 450 hp (340 kW)
- Propellers: 2-bladed Hamilton-Standard controllable-pitch propeller, 8 ft 6 in (2.59 m) diameter

Performance

- Maximum speed: 158 mph (255 km/h, 137 kn)
- Cruise speed: 143 mph (230 km/h, 124 kn) at 5,000 ft (1,500 m)
- Range: 455 mi (732 km, 395 nmi)
- Service ceiling: 18,000 ft (5,500 m)
- Rate of climb: 1,020 ft/min (5.2 m/s)

== See also ==
- de Havilland Canada DHC-3 Otter

Aircraft of comparable role, configuration, and era

- Fairchild F-11 Husky
- GippsAero GA8 Airvan
- Helio Courier
- Max Holste M.H. 1521 Broussard
- Murphy Moose
- Noorduyn Norseman
- PAC 750XL
- Pilatus PC-6 Porter

Related lists

- List of carrier-based aircraft
