= Jim Taylor (footballer, born 1934) =

English footballer (1934–2017)

Personal information
- Full name: James Taylor
- Date of birth: 13 May 1934
- Place of birth: Strood, England
- Date of death: April 2017 (aged 82)
- Place of death: Kent, England
- Position: Striker

Senior career*
Years	Team	Apps	(Gls)
?–1954	Tonbridge		
1954–1956	Charlton Athletic	0	(0)
1956–1958	Gillingham	30	(16)
1958–?	Watford	0	(0)
- * Club domestic league appearances and goals as of 21:50, 7 December 2007 (UTC)

James Taylor (13 May 1934 – April 2017) was an English professional footballer.

== Life and career ==
Born in Strood, he began his career on the books of Charlton Athletic but made no appearances for them before a move to Gillingham. He made 30 Football League appearances for the Kent club, finishing as top scorer in the 1955–56 season, but made only one appearance the following season and then moved on to Watford. He left Watford without ever making a first-team appearance and there is no record of him playing for any other club at a professional level.

Taylor died in Kent in April 2017, at the age of 82.
