= James Taylor (New South Wales politician) =

Australian politician

James Taylor was an Australian politician.

He was one of Charles Cowper's 21 appointments to the New South Wales Legislative Council in May 1861, but did not take his seat.
