= Jimmy Taylor (rugby league) =

English rugby league footballer

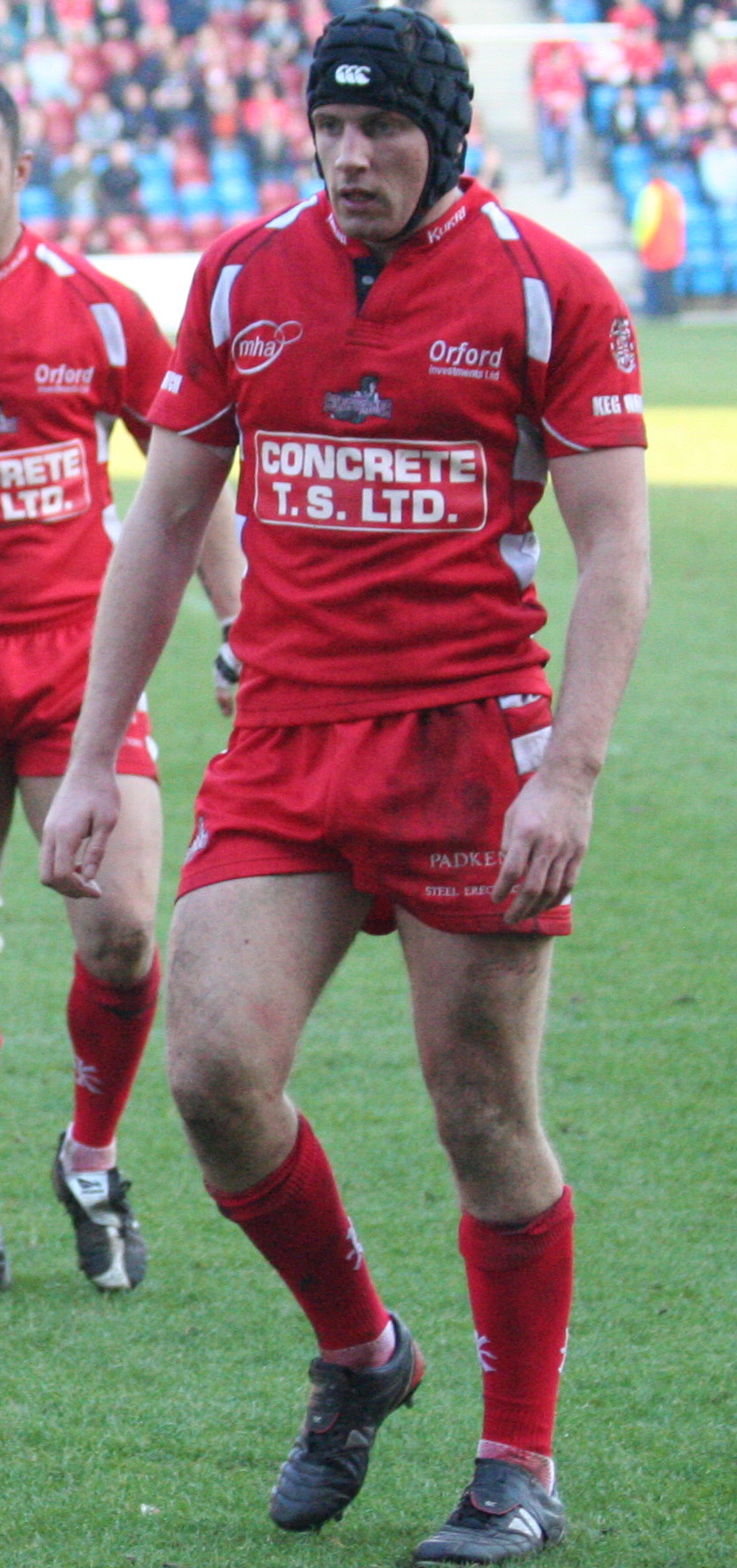

Personal information
- Full name: James Taylor
- Born: 11 September 1984 (age 41) Haydock, St. Helens

Playing information
- Position: Second-row
Club
Years	Team	Pld	T	G	FG	P
2005–13	Leigh Centurions	183	24	0	0	96
- Source: As of 1 January 2012

Jimmy Taylor (born 11 September 1984) is a former professional rugby league footballer for the Leigh Centurions in the Co-Operative Championship. He played in the second-row or at loose forward, lock.

Taylor played as a junior at Leigh East and toured New Zealand with the BARLA Young Lions side before joining hometown club Leigh Centurions, making his début in a home victory over London Broncos in 2005.

Taylor has twice won silverware with his only professional club, winning the Northern Rail Cup in 2006 against Hull Kingston Rovers, and the same competition again in 2011 against Halifax.
