= James Blackstone Taylor =

American marketing executive

James B. Taylor
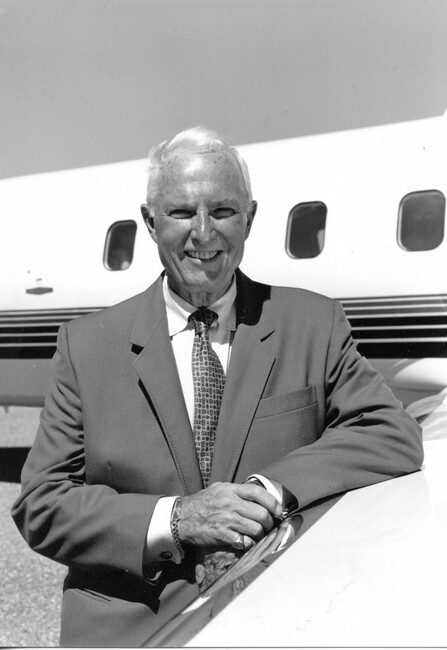
- Born: James Blackstone Taylor III; 14 December 1921; New York City, NY
- Died: 17 January 2003 (aged 81); Bridgeport, CT
- Other names: Jim Taylor, Mr. BizJet
- Occupation: Aviation marketing executive
- Known for: Creating business jet marketing programs for Pan Am, Cessna, and Canadair and rescuing Gates LearJet
- Spouse: Margaret (Peg) Krout Taylor (1947–)
- Children: 4

James Blackstone Taylor III (December 14, 1921; died January 17, 2003), also known as Jim Taylor, was an American aviation executive known for his work in corporate jet marketing, specifically the Pan Am Falcon, the Cessna Citation, the Canadair Challenger, and the Gates Learjet. Taylor served as president at Canadair from 1976 to 1985 and president and chief executive officer at Gates Learjet Corporation from 1985 to 1988.

== Early life and education ==
Taylor was born on December 14, 1921, in New York City, the third of six children to James Blackstone Taylor Jr, and Aileen (Sedgwick) Taylor Lippincott. He took his name and passion for airplanes from his father, James Blackstone Taylor Jr., also an aviation enthusiast. He graduated from the Taft School in Watertown, Connecticut in 1940 and in 1942 became the first high school graduate to be accepted by the US Navy for naval cadet flight training in World War II. His father, a renowned naval test pilot, was killed testing new aircraft that same year.

== Career ==
Like his father, Taylor became a naval test pilot and later a flight instructor and carrier-based fighter pilot for four years.

After leaving the Navy in 1946, Taylor flew DC-3s for a nonscheduled airline, but the carrier folded six months later. Then, moving to Teterboro, New Jersey–based Mallard Air Service, his marketing career began selling the North American Navion. One of his first sales was made to radio and TV personality Arthur Godfrey and Taylor could often be found serving as pilot for the entertainer's aircraft on the weekend.

In 1948, Taylor joined Upressit Metal Cap Corporation as a sales manager, flying the company's Beechcraft Bonanza to make sales calls. His direct marketing resulted in the tripling of sales, and he was appointed president after two years. Then, in 1962, he sold Upressit to its largest competitor, American Flange & Mfg. Co.

Pan Am Falcon

Returning to aviation in 1963, Taylor joined Pan American World Airways (Pan Am) as VP of its Business Jet Division, the subsidiary responsible for marketing the Falcon series of business jets. Originally named Mystere 20 by the French manufacturer Dassault, Taylor proposed the name change to make it more marketable in the U.S. With Pan Am, Taylor launched the first factory-direct sales and service organization in business jet history, setting sales standards that focused a customers’ requirements, and perfecting the marketing techniques that would later become his trademark.

Cessna Citation

Following his success at Pan Am, Taylor was appointed VP and general manager at Cessna by President Dwayne Wallace. Charged with helping develop and sell the company's Cessna Fanjet 500, he promptly renamed it after horse racing's 1948, Triple Crown winner, Citation. The Citation was slow at 300 mph compared to competitors, but it could land at hundreds of additional airports that other jets could not. Taylor successfully convinced Wallace to bypass Cessna's established network of 200 dealers and instead follow the factory-direct approach, arguing that significant capital investments, such as a jet airplane, must be sold directly to upper management and pilots.

Canadair Challenger

In 1976, Taylor left Cessna and joined Canadair Inc., the marketing arm of Canadair Ltd. (now Bombardier) as president & CEO. Canadair had acquired the rights to manufacture the LearStar 600 which had not even begun production. Taylor assembled a team of former sales associates and renamed it the Challenger. The Canadian Government, who owned Canadair, tasked Taylor with selling at least 50 of the Challengers within six months or the program would cease. Taylor's sales team, which included associates like Pete Ginocchio, used the same strategies that Taylor pioneered in previous endeavors and 110 orders were placed before the prototype's first flight.

Gates Learjet

Having successfully launched three new business jets, the Pan Am Falcon, the Cessna Citation, and the Canadair Challenger, Taylor moved to the financially troubled Gates Learjet Corporation in 1985, where he was named president and CEO to eliminate debt, expand sales, and develop new models to position the company for acquisition. After several trips to Congress and the Pentagon, Taylor successfully converted the U.S. Air Force's lease of 80 Lear 35s, a $2 million per month drain on the firm, into a sale. In 1988, after the sale of Gates Learjet to Integrated Resources (who later sold it to Bombardier), Taylor left to establish James B. Taylor Associates, an aviation management and marketing advisory service in Southport, Connecticut. He remained active in the aviation industry as a consultant and served on the boards of several aircraft manufacturing companies and associations until his death in 2003.

== Innovation ==
Taylor initiated factory-direct selling of corporate jets and gave them names instead of numbers.

He began working for Pan American World Airways (Pan Am) in 1963, serving as the vice president of its newly created Business Jets Division. This move by Pan Am was unprecedented in the commercial airline industry and demonstrated their interest in the emerging field of business aviation. The airline decided to offer the French-built Dassault Mystere 20 in the western hemisphere after carefully comparing it to the North American Sabreliner, the Lockheed JetStar, and the DeHavilland 125, another aviation first.

Cessna's first business jet was introduced with an all-inclusive package developed by Taylor, a novel concept in the industry at that time. Each Citation package included a fully equipped aircraft, training for two pilots and two mechanics, and one year of computerized maintenance scheduling. Taylor's direct-mail marketing campaigns were tailored to different target groups, such as chief pilots, aviation departments, and top executives, with personalized messages that effectively generated interest and sales. He was also known for his approach to direct mail campaigns using three-dimensional objects. During the 1973 oil crisis, for example, Cessna Citation prospects received boxes on their desks containing several plastic oil barrels, each bearing the name of a competing aircraft with barrel size representing comparative fuel burns over a given distance. The smallest barrel was labeled Citation. By 1982, 1,000 Cessna Citations were sold.

In 1976, Taylor discovered a new marketing opportunity at Canadair, which had acquired the manufacturing rights for the LearStar 600, originally designed by Bill Lear. Taylor assembled a team of former associates to focus on sales and rebranded the aircraft as the Canadair Challenger, which remains in production today. His Innovations can be best summarized as follows:

- Factory Service Centers
- Sell as a complete package (avionics, interior)
- Factory Pilot Training and computerized maintenance
- Interviewed pilots and executives in the program's early development stage to make sure the jet's specifications met the customers’ needs.
- At Canadair, the airplane's original designer, Bill Lear, became enraged over Canadair's changes to his prototype, which he called the LearStar 600. Taylor's market research showed that customers wanted a wider cabin than that of the LearStar. Canadair engineers came up with this and other significant changes to the prototype, much to Lear's chagrin. Lear stalked off in a huff, calling the redesigned airplane "Fat Albert."
- At Cessna, The new price included a complete ready-to-fly package designed for the concept market; that is, for customers who had never owned an airplane before. He invited pilots and their bosses to the Wichita factory, and if they could not come then he would take the airplane to them with an innovative concept—a full-scale mock-up of the Citation's interior. He launched the broadest marketing studies ever undertaken of the business aircraft market and began identifying a host of business operator requirements rarely if ever considered during a business jet development program.

== Legacy ==
Jim Taylor was selected for the Aviation Week & Space Technology Laureates Hall of Fame, now housed at the Smithsonian Institution's National Air and Space Museum in Washington, DC. He received the National Business Aviation Association (NBAA) Meritorious Service to Aviation Award, the National Aeronautic Association’s Elder Statesman of Aviation Award, and the Gathering of Eagles Program’s Man of the Year Award. He has also been nominated for the National Aviation Hall of Fame.

Taylor’s team members and associates went on to leadership roles in a variety of aviation corporations including Bill Boisture (President Gulfstream Aerospace Corporation, President NetJets Inc., Hawker Beechcraft Corporation), Richard Emery (President Executive Aircraft Services, Kimberly Clark/President/CEO K-C Aviation), Pete Ginocchio (Duncan Aviation, Dassault Falcon Jet Corp.), Dave Hurley (Privat Air, Business Express Airlines, and chairman, Smithsonian Air & Space Museum), Roger McMullin (Tag Aviation, Aviation Methods), and Bryan Moss (President Gulfstream Aerospace, President Bombardier Business Aircraft Div).

In the 1991 National Business Aircraft Association convention in Houston, a special reception was held for Taylor, where one of his associates, Pete Ginocchio said, "Jim Taylor made a huge contribution to our industry and our personal lives…on top of that, he is a class act."
