= Jim Taylor (footballer, born 1893) =

Australian rules footballer

Personal information
- Full name: James Taylor
- Born: 27 October 1893; Essendon, Victoria
- Died: 15 December 1969 (aged 76); Hamilton, Victoria

Playing career^{1}
Years	Club	Games (Goals)
1918	Essendon	1 (0)
- ^{1} Playing statistics correct to the end of 1918.

James Taylor (27 October 1893 – 15 December 1969) was an Australian rules footballer who played with Essendon in the Victorian Football League (VFL).

== Family ==
The son of James Taylor, J.P. (1949-1902), the secretary of McCracken's City Brewery, and Mary Taylor (1849-1927), née Russell, James Taylor was born at Essendon, Victoria on 27 October 1893.

== Football ==
He played in one senior match for Essendon, against St Kilda, at the East Melbourne Cricket Ground, on 18 May 1918, at a time when Essendon was having great difficulty fielding teams — having not contested either the 1916 or 1917 VFL season.

== Military service ==
At the age of 48, Taylor, a grocer, enlisted in the Volunteer Defence Corps, and served in the 9th Battalion of VDC during World War II.

== Death ==
He died at Hamilton, Victoria on 15 December 1969.
