= Jim Taylor (footballer, born 1944) =

Scottish footballer

Personal information
- Date of birth: 21 September 1944 (age 82)
- Place of birth: Scotland
- Position: Right half

Senior career*
Years	Team	Apps	(Gls)
–1963	Luncarty Juniors		
1963–1966	St Johnstone	0	(0)
1966–1973	Cowdenbeath	202	(15)
1973–1974	St Mirren	15	(2)
1974	Forfar Athletic	10	(0)
1974–1979	Raith Rovers	139	(6)
- * Club domestic league appearances and goals

Jim Taylor (born 21 September 1944) is a Scottish retired football right half, best remembered for his time in the Scottish League with Cowdenbeath and Raith Rovers. He also played for St Mirren and Forfar Athletic.

== Personal life ==
Taylor worked as a joiner.

== Career statistics ==
Appearances and goals by club, season and competition
Club	Season	League			National Cup		League Cup		Total	
Club	Season	Division	Apps	Goals	Apps	Goals	Apps	Goals	Apps	Goals
Forfar Athletic	1974–75	Second Division	10	0	0	0	3	0	13	0
Career total			10	0	0	0	3	0	13	0

== Honours ==
Cowdenbeath

- Scottish League Second Division second-place promotion: 1969–70

Individual

- Cowdenbeath Hall of Fame
