= James Taylor (cricketer, born 1846) =

English cricketer

James Taylor (25 May 1846 – 16 August 1915), also known as Jim Taylor, was an English cricketer who played for Lancashire County Cricket Club.

Taylor was born in Littleborough and played club cricket for the local side as well as for Rochdale Cricket Club. He appeared in three first-class matches, scoring 52 runs with a highest score of 33 made in his first match at Gravesend against Kent in 1871. He played once more the same year, before making his final first-class appearance for the county side in 1873.

Taylor worked as an iron moulder. He died at Rochdale in 1915 aged 69.
