= James Taylor (cricketer, born 1809) =

English cricketer

James Taylor (born 9 January 1809) was an English professional cricketer who played from 1834 to 1844. He was mainly associated with Sussex and made 28 known appearances including 1 for the Players in 1837.

== Bibliography ==
- Haygarth, Arthur (1996) [1862]. Scores & Biographies, Volume 1 (1744–1826). Kennington: Frederick Lillywhite. ISBN 978-19-00592-23-9.
- Haygarth, Arthur (1997) [1862]. Scores & Biographies, Volume 2 (1827–1840). Kennington: Frederick Lillywhite. ISBN 978-19-00592-23-9.
