= 2018 K2 Aviation DHC-2 crash =

2018 aviation accident in Alaska

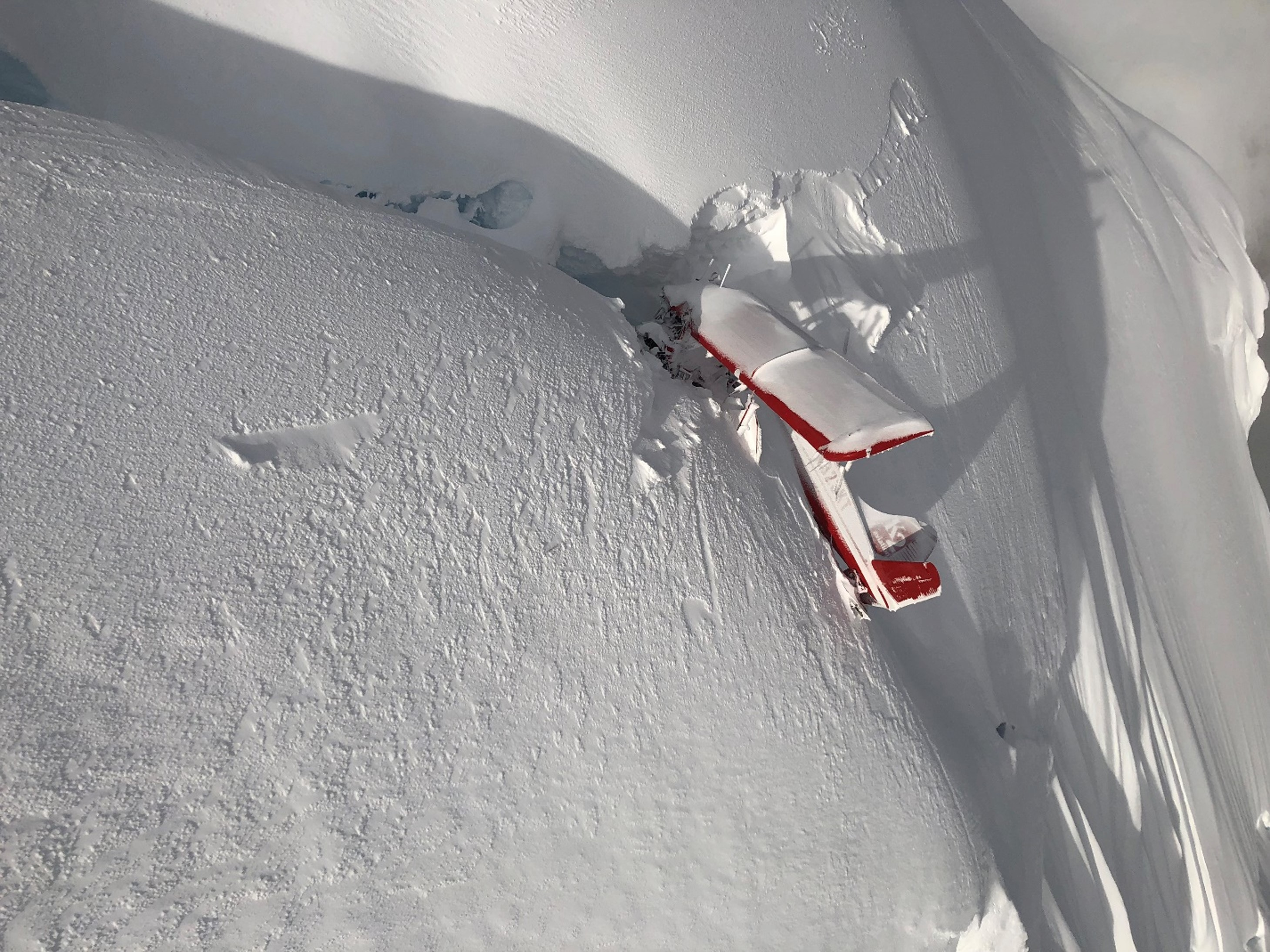
- Wreckage of the aircraft

Accident
- Date: 4 August 2018
- Summary: Impacted glacier 10,920 feet (3,330 m) above sea level, possible controlled flight into terrain
- Site: Thunder Mountain, Denali National Park, Alaska; 62°47′25″N 151°13′31″W

Aircraft
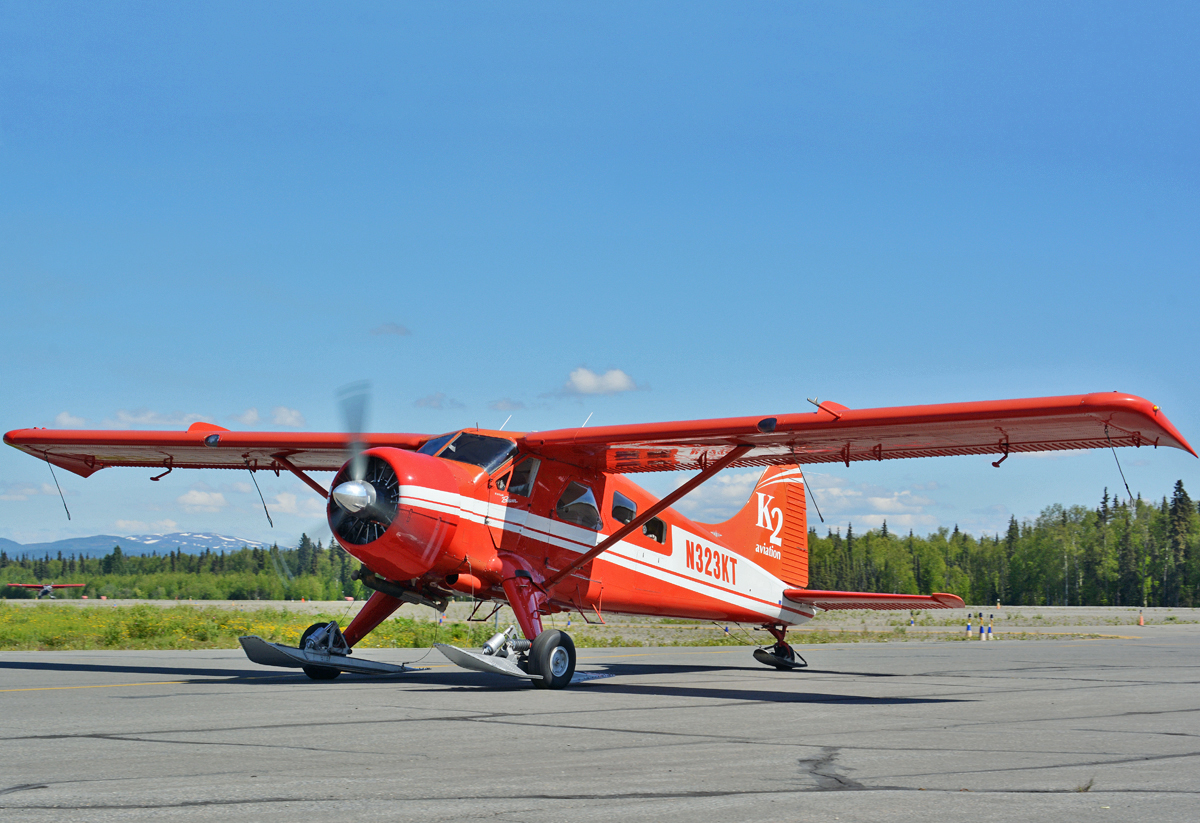
- N323KT, the aircraft involved in the accident, pictured in 2014
- Aircraft type: DHC-2 Beaver
- Operator: K2 Aviation
- Registration: N323KT
- Flight origin: Talkeetna, Alaska
- Occupants: 5
- Passengers: 4
- Crew: 1
- Fatalities: 5
- Survivors: 0

On 4 August 2018, a de Havilland Canada DHC-2 Beaver aircraft operated by K2 Aviation crashed in poor weather at Denali National Park and Preserve in Alaska, United States. All five people on board survived the crash, but died before rescuers were able to arrive at the scene. The five people consisted of the pilot and four Polish tourists.

== Initial rescue efforts ==
Upon crashing, the aircraft's ELT alerted the Alaska Rescue Coordination Center at about 6:00 pm local time on Saturday. The pilot contacted K2 Aviation via satellite phone at 7:00 pm to report his situation and request help, stating the flight had run "into the side of a mountain." The pilot called at least two times and reported his coordinates as well as the medical condition of the passengers. However, due to extreme weather and reduced visibility, only limited search and rescue operations were feasible. A National Guard HH-60 Pave Hawk helicopter, and a Denali National Park A-Star B3e helicopter were deployed on Saturday evening after the crash, but were unable to locate the crash site or make radio contact.

The rescue operations were coordinated by K2 Aviation, Alaska State Troopers, the National Park Service, Alaska Air National Guard, the NTSB, the FAA and other authorities. Aircraft involved in the search also included a Lockheed HC-130, and a de Havilland Beaver loaded with an emergency survival kit.

== Location identified ==
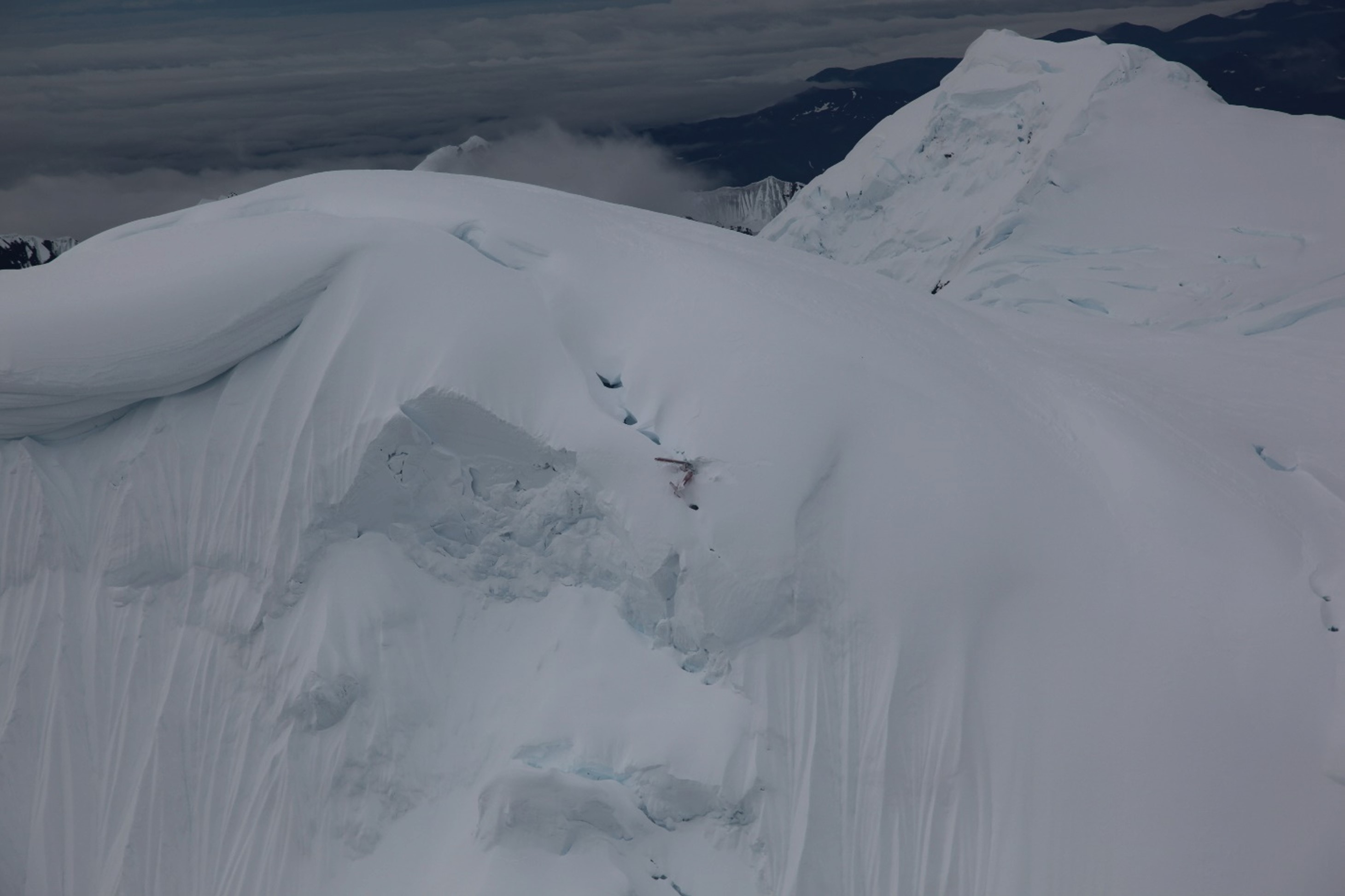
Overview of the impact site

On the morning of Monday, August 6, just under 36 hours after the crash, the National Park Service located the crash site by helicopter. The aircraft fuselage was identified in a crevasse on a hanging glacier about 10,920 feet (3,330 m) above sea level on Thunder Mountain at coordinates 62.790279°N 151.22528°W, about 14 miles (23 km) southwest of Denali. Due to the steep and hazardous terrain, the helicopter could not land, and lowered a ranger by wire to investigate on foot. When the ranger arrived at the site, the aircraft was buried in snow, and four occupants were deceased within. The fifth occupant could not be located, but was presumed dead due to the absence of footprints leading away from the crash site, which would indicate an attempt to self-rescue. The ranger was forced to evacuate within five minutes due to deteriorating weather conditions. Four days later on August 10, a second followup mission located the final deceased passenger in the aft fuselage.

The National Park Service reported the same day that there are no plans to recover the aircraft or the bodies of those killed, citing the treacherous location.

== Investigation ==
The NTSB investigated the incident, publishing a final report on 16 December 2019, although NTSB personnel were unable to access the hazardous site personally and instead relied on NPS ranger testimony:

The airplane was located on August 6 by a National Park Service (NPS) helicopter crew in a crevasse on a hanging glacier on Thunder Mountain (about 14 miles (23 km) southwest of the Denali summit) at an elevation at about 10,920 feet (3,330 m) msl. Due to the location of the wreckage, NTSB personnel were unable to access the accident site. The airplane was highly fragmented and the right wing had separated and fallen several hundred feet below the main wreckage. The fuselage was fractured aft of the trailing edge of the wing and the fuselage was splayed open with blown snow inside. An impact mark consistent with the right wing was visible in the snow, and the airplane appeared to have impacted in a near wings-level attitude. — National Transportation Safety Board, Aviation Accident Final Report, Accident Number: ANC18FA063

Investigators were unable to determine a probable cause due to the inaccessibility of the crash site. The report noted:

Although the known circumstances of the accident are consistent with a controlled flight into terrain event, the factual information available was limited because the wreckage was not recovered and no autopsy or toxicology of the pilot could be performed; therefore, whether other circumstances may have contributed to the accident could not be determined. — National Transportation Safety Board, Aviation Accident Final Report, Accident Number: ANC18FA063

The crash debris field was subsequently destroyed by glacial activity in April 2019, along with the presumed remains of the passengers and crew:

About 8 months after the accident, an assessment flight conducted by the National Park Service determined that during the winter, the hazardous hanging glacier at the accident site calved, releasing an estimated 4,000–6,000 short tons (3,600–5,400 t) of ice and debris. There was no evidence of the airplane wreckage near the crash site, in the steep fall line, or on the glacier surface over 3,600 feet (1,100 m) below. [...] Further inspection of high-definition digital imagery taken during the [5 April 2019] assessment flight confirmed that the wreckage was not visible on the mountain face or in the surface debris at the base of Thunder Mountain. — National Transportation Safety Board, Aviation Accident Final Report, Accident Number: ANC18FA063

== See also ==
- 2013 Soldotna Rediske Air DHC-3 Otter crash
