= James E. Taylor =

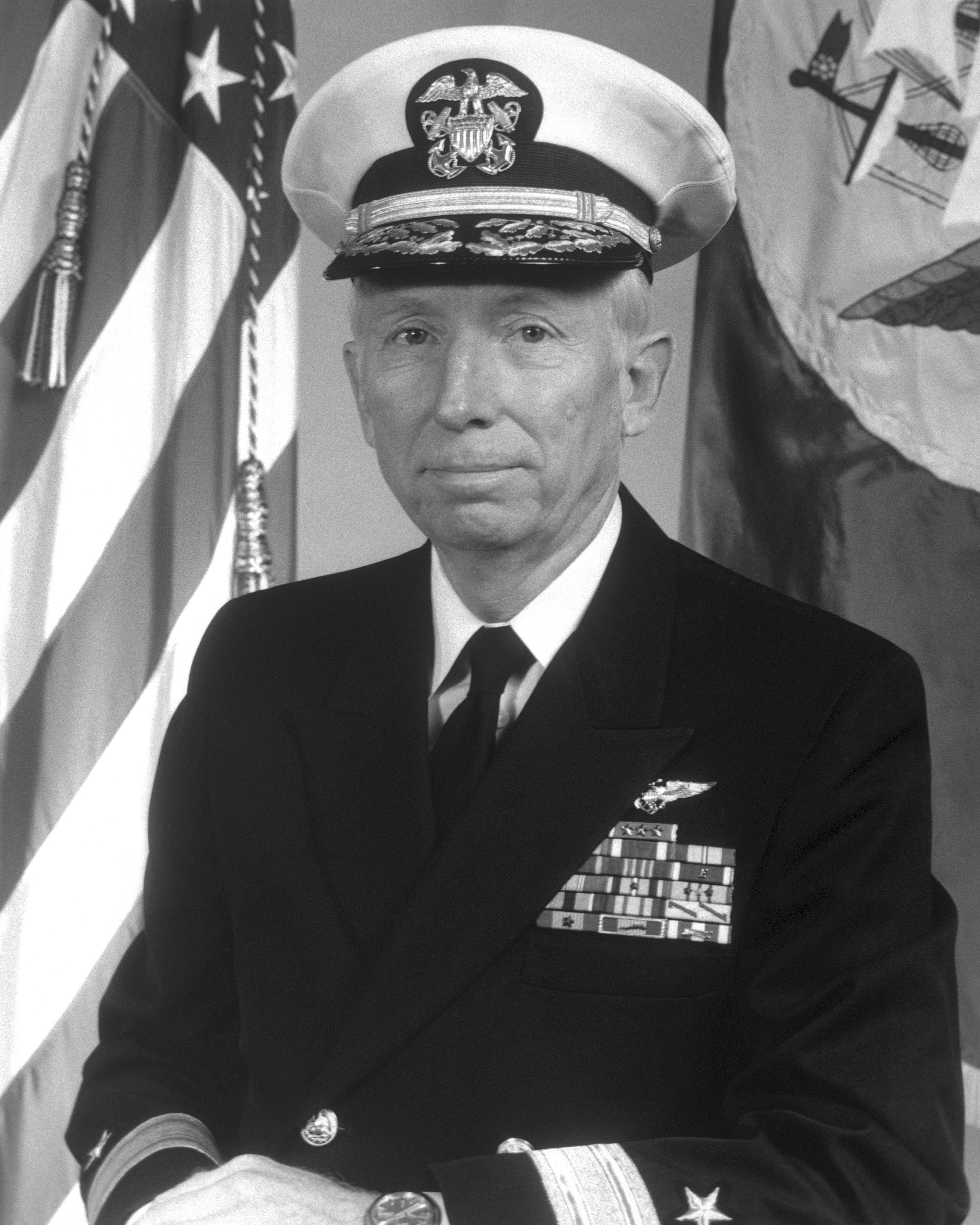
- Rear Adm. James E. Taylor in 1986
- Born: August 30, 1935 (age 91); Alabama, United States
- Military career
- Allegiance: United States
- Branch: United States Navy
- Rank: Rear Admiral
- Commands: United States Naval Reserve; Fighter Medium Attack Airborne Early Warning Wings, Atlantic; Naval Air Station Miramar; VF-11
- Conflicts: Vietnam War
- Awards: Legion of Merit (4)

James Edward Taylor (born August 30, 1935) was a rear admiral in the United States Navy. He was Chief of the United States Naval Reserve from August 1989 until September 1992. He was succeeded by Thomas F. Hall.

Born and raised in Alabama, Taylor entered the United States Navy through the Naval Aviation Cadet Program. He completed flight training in 1957 and was commissioned as an ensign. Taylor later earned a Bachelor of Science degree from the Naval Postgraduate School and a master's degree in financial management from George Washington University.

== Personal ==
Taylor's first marriage ended in divorce. He then married Amanda Nottingham Dillon on July 25, 1974 in Virginia Beach, Virginia.
