= James Taylor (nonconformist minister) =

19th century English minister

James Taylor was a nonconformist minister who established the first Freehold Land Society in Birmingham in December 1847. Taylor had previously paid a prominent role in the Temperance movement and had participated in the Anti Corn Law League.
