= Henry Taylor =

Henry Taylor may refer to:

== Academics ==
- Henry Charles Taylor (1873–1969), agricultural economist
- Henry Kirby Taylor (1858–1934), college president in United States
- Henry Martyn Taylor (1842–1927), English mathematician and barrister
- Henry Osborn Taylor (1856–1941), American historian and legal scholar

== Arts ==
- Henry Taylor (artist) (born 1958), American artist
- Henry Taylor (dramatist) (1800–1886), English dramatist
- Henry Taylor (organist) (1859–?), English organist and composer
- Henry Fitch Taylor (1853–1925), American artist
- Henry S. Taylor (1942–2024), American poet

== Religion ==
- Henry Taylor (priest) (1711–1785), Church of England priest and religious controversialist
- Henry D. Taylor (1903–1987), American leader in The Church of Jesus Christ of Latter-day Saints
- Henry Gordon Taylor (1908–1987), New Zealand Anglican priest and military chaplain

== Politics ==
- Henry Taylor (diplomat) (1598–1662), English Catholic priest in the diplomatic service of the Spanish Habsburgs
- Henry Taylor (politician) (1872/3–1957), Unionist politician in Northern Ireland
- Henry D'Esterre Taylor (1853–1909), Australian banker and federalist
- Sir Henry Milton Taylor (1903–1994), Bahamian politician and governor-general
- Henry C. Taylor (c. 1814–1889), American politician, mayor of Jersey City, New Jersey
- Henry I. Taylor (1862–1943), Canadian politician
- Henry J. Taylor (1902–1984), American author, economist and ambassador to Switzerland
- Henry L. Taylor, U.S. chargé d'affaires ad interim in Panama, 1964, United States Ambassador to Panama
- Henry Robert Taylor, British politician, mayor of Camberwell
- Henry Wyllys Taylor (1796–1888), American politician and jurist

== Sports ==
- Henry Taylor (boxer) (1914–?), American boxer
- Henry Taylor (racing driver) (1932–2013), British race car driver
- Henry Taylor (swimmer) (1885–1951), British long-distance swimmer
- Henry Taylor (cricketer, born 1822) (1822–1901), English cricketer
- Henry Taylor (cricketer, born 1856) (1856–1896), British cricketer
- Henry Taylor (cricketer, born 1875) (1875–1903), Indian-born English sportsman
- Henry Taylor (cricketer, born 1949), English cricketer
- Henry Taylor (American football) (born 1975), American football player
- Henry Taylor (rugby union, born 1858) (1858–1942), English rugby union international
- Henry Taylor (rugby union, born 1994), English rugby union scrum-half
- Henry Morgan Taylor (1889–1955), New Zealand rugby union player and cricketer

== Other ==
- Henry Taylor (carpenter) (1823–1891), Wilmington North Carolina–based carpenter and builder
- Henry Taylor (trade unionist), British trade union leader
- Henry Clay Taylor (1845–1904), US rear admiral
- Henry H. Taylor (1841–1909), American soldier and Medal of Honor recipient
- Henry Reed Taylor (1866–1917), American naturalist
- Henry Seth Taylor, creator of the Henry Seth Taylor steam buggy, the first known car built in Canada
- Henry Stryker Taylor, Illinois financier
- Henry Taylor (24 character), character on the television series 24

== See also ==
- Harry Taylor (disambiguation)
- List of people with surname Taylor
