= Senator Taylor =

Senator Taylor may refer to:

== Fictional characters ==
- Allison Taylor, a fictional U.S. Senator portrayed by Cherry Jones on the TV series 24

== Members of the Northern Irish Senate ==
- Henry Taylor (politician) (1872/1873–1957), Northern Irish Senator from 1938 to 1957

== Members of the United States Senate ==
- Glen H. Taylor (1904–1984), U.S. Senator from Idaho from 1945 to 1951
- John Taylor (South Carolina governor) (1770–1832), U.S. Senator from South Carolina from 1810 to 1816
- John Taylor of Caroline (1753–1824), U.S. Senator from Virginia from 1792 to 1894, in 1803, and from 1822 to 1824
- Robert Love Taylor (1850–1912), U.S. Senator from Tennessee from 1907 to 1912
- Waller Taylor (1786–1826), U.S. Senator from Indiana from 1816 to 1825

== United States state senate members ==
=== Alabama State Senate ===
- Bryan Taylor (politician) (born 1976)

=== Alaska State Senate ===
- Robin L. Taylor (born 1943)

=== Arizona State Senate ===
- Jack Taylor (Arizona politician) (1907–1995)
- Leah Landrum Taylor (born 1966)

=== Arkansas State Senate ===
- Jerry Taylor (politician) (1937–2016)

=== California State Senate ===
- Nelson Taylor (1821–1894)

=== Colorado State Senate ===
- Edward T. Taylor (1858–1941)
- Jack Taylor (Colorado politician) (1935–2020)
- Rena Mary Taylor (fl. 1950s–1960s)
- Sam T. Taylor (1903–1977)

=== Connecticut State Senate ===
- George Taylor (Connecticut politician) (1802–1881)
- Nelson Taylor Jr. (1854–1912)

=== Florida State Senate ===
- John Stansel Taylor (1871–1936)

=== Georgia State Senate ===
- Mark Taylor (American politician) (born 1957)

=== Idaho State Senate ===
- Fredrick Monroe Taylor (1901–1988)
- Ron Taylor (politician) (born 1964)

=== Illinois State Senate ===
- Edmund Dick Taylor (1804–1891)
- James C. Taylor (1930–1999)

=== Indiana State Senate ===
- Greg Taylor (politician) (born 1969/70), Indiana State Senate

=== Iowa State Senate ===
- Jeff Taylor (politician) (born 1961)
- John Taylor (20th-century Iowa politician) (1870–?)
- Ray Taylor (politician) (1923–2015)
- Rich Taylor (politician) (born 1954)

=== Kansas State Senate ===
- Mary Jo Taylor (born 1953)

=== Louisiana State Senate ===
- Richard Taylor (Confederate general) (1826–1879)

=== Massachusetts State Senate ===
- George Sylvester Taylor (1822–1910)

=== Michigan State Senate ===
- Henry Wyllys Taylor (1796–1888)

=== Minnesota State Senate ===
- Glen Taylor (born 1941)

=== Mississippi State Senate ===
- John Peroutt Taylor (1855–1930)
- Lane Taylor (politician) (fl. 2020s)

=== Missouri State Senate ===
- Larry Gene Taylor (1953–2005)

=== Montana State Senate ===
- Janna Taylor (born 1948)
- Mike Taylor (Montana politician) (born 1941)

=== New Jersey State Senate ===
- John Taylor (Taylor Ham) (1837–1909)

=== New Mexico State Senate ===
- James Taylor (New Mexico politician) (born 1966)

=== New York State Senate ===
- John W. Taylor (politician) (1784–1854)

=== North Carolina State Senate ===
- Charles Taylor (North Carolina politician) (born 1941)
- Hoyt Patrick Taylor (1890–1964)

=== North Dakota State Senate ===
- Ryan Taylor (politician) (born 1970)

=== Ohio State Senate ===
- Jonathan Taylor (Ohio politician) (1796–1848)
- Vincent A. Taylor (1845–1922)

=== Oklahoma State Senate ===
- Stratton Taylor (born 1956)
- Zack Taylor (Oklahoma politician) (fl. 2010s–2020s)

=== Oregon State Senate ===
- Kathleen Taylor (politician) (born 1966/67)

=== Pennsylvania State Senate ===
- M. Harvey Taylor (1876–1982)

=== South Carolina State Senate ===
- John C. Taylor (1890–1983)

=== Tennessee State Senate ===
- Brent Taylor (Tennessee politician) (born 1968)

=== Texas State Senate ===
- Larry Taylor (politician) (born 1960)
- M. D. K. Taylor (1818–1897)
- Van Taylor (born 1972)

=== Vermont State Senate ===
- William H. Taylor (judge) (1863–1926)

=== Virginia State Senate ===
- Robert Taylor (Virginia politician) (1763–1845)
- Samuel Taylor (Virginia politician) (1781–1853)

=== Washington State Senate ===
- Howard D. Taylor (1878–1944)

=== West Virginia State Senate ===
- Jay Taylor (West Virginia politician) (born 1973)

=== Wisconsin State Senate ===
- Charles Simeon Taylor (1851–1913)
- David Taylor (Wisconsin judge) (1818–1891)
- Horace Adolphus Taylor (1837–1910)
- Lena Taylor (born 1966)
- William Robert Taylor (1820–1909)

== See also ==
- John Tayler (1742–1829), New York State Senate
- Robert Walker Tayler Sr. (1812–1878), Ohio State Senate
- John Tayloe III (1770–1828), Virginia State Senate
