= Harold Taylor =

Harold Taylor may refer to:

- Harold Taylor (Canadian politician), politician from Manitoba
- Harold Taylor (Australian politician) (1892–1972), company executive and member of the Queensland Legislative Assembly
- Harold Taylor (basketball coach), University of Minnesota head basketball coach in the 1920s
- Harold Burfield Taylor (1890–1966), Australian Army officer in World Wars I and II
- Harold Dennis Taylor (1862–1943), British optical designer
- Harold E. Taylor (1939–2001), American physicist and academic
- Harold Taylor (polymath) (1907–1995), New Zealand-born British art historian, mathematician, and physicist
- Harold Taylor (footballer, born 1912) (1912–?), footballer for Liverpool and Stoke City
- Harold Taylor (footballer, born 1902) (1902–1963), English footballer
- Harold Taylor (cricketer) (1909–1990), English cricketer
- Harold Taylor (educator) (1914–1993), president of Sarah Lawrence College

== See also ==
- Harry Taylor (disambiguation)
- Lal Taylor (1910–1970), English footballer
