= Harry Taylor =

Harry Taylor may refer to:

== Sports ==
=== Baseball ===
- Harry Taylor (1890s first baseman) (1866–1955), played for the Louisville Colonels and Baltimore Orioles
- Harry Taylor (1930s first baseman) (1907–1969), played for the Chicago Cubs
- Harry Taylor (1946–1952 pitcher) (1919–2000), played for the Brooklyn Dodgers and Boston Red Sox
- Harry Taylor (1957 pitcher) (1935–2013), played for the Kansas City Athletics

=== Football ===
- Harry Taylor (Australian rules footballer) (born 1986), Australian rules footballer for the Geelong Football Club
- Harry Taylor (footballer, born 1892) (1892–1960), English footballer
- Harry Taylor (footballer, born 1881) (1881–1917), Scottish footballer
- Harry Taylor (footballer, born 1935) (1935–2017), English footballer
- Harry Taylor (footballer, born 1997), English footballer

=== Other sportsmen ===
- Harry Taylor (alpine skier) (1924–1995), British Olympic skier
- Harry Taylor (cricketer) (1900–1988), English cricketer
- Harry Taylor (mountaineer) (born 1958), British SAS member and mountaineer
- Harry Taylor (ice hockey) (1926–2009), professional ice hockey player
- Harry Taylor (rugby league), rugby league footballer of the 1900s for Great Britain, England, and Hull F.C.
- Harry Taylor (rugby union) (born 2001), English rugby union player
- Harry Taylor (swimmer) (born 1968), Canadian Olympic swimmer
- Harry Taylor (bowls) (born 1930), English lawn bowler

== Others ==
- Harry Taylor (engineer) (1862–1930), U.S. Army chief of engineers and general
- Harry S Taylor, editor of the Murray Pioneer, South Australian newspaper
- USS General Harry Taylor (AP-145), a transport ship in the United States Navy in World War II

== See also ==
- Henry Taylor (disambiguation)
- Harold Taylor (disambiguation)
