= Dave Wattenberg =

American politician

Member of the Colorado Senate from the 8th district
- In office January 9, 1985 – January 10, 2001
- Preceded by: Sam H. Zakhem
- Succeeded by: Jack Taylor

Member of the Colorado House of Representatives from the 56th district
- In office January 12, 1983 – January 9, 1985
- Preceded by: W.P. Hinman
- Succeeded by: Dan Williams

Personal details
- Born: April 4, 1940 Walden, Colorado
- Died: January 20, 2014 (aged 73) Lakewood, Colorado
- Party: Republican

Dave Wattenberg (April 4, 1940 – January 20, 2014) was an American politician who served in the Colorado House of Representatives from the 56th district from 1983 to 1985 and in the Colorado Senate from the 8th district from 1985 to 2001.

He died on January 20, 2014, in Lakewood, Colorado at age 73.
