= Father Taylor =

Father Taylor may refer to:

- male parent named Taylor (surname) or Taylor (given name)

male clergyman of various religious groups

a particular male clergyman in priest's orders (either secular or "religious") having the surname Taylor; in Anglican churches usually only those who are High churchmen

- Charles Taylor (priest) (1953-)
- Edward Thompson Taylor (1793-1871)
- Henry Gordon Taylor (1908–1987)
- Hugh Taylor (priest) (-1585)
- Isaac Taylor (priest) (1829-1901)
- James Ignatius Taylor (1805-1875)
- Paul Taylor (priest) (1953-)
- Robert Taylor (Archdeacon of Lewes)
- Robert Taylor (Provost of Cumbrae)
- Stephen Taylor (priest) (1955-)
- William Taylor (Dean of Portsmouth) (1956-)
- William Taylor (Lollard) (-1423)
- John Taylor (Master of the Rolls) (1480-1534)
