= The Barn (arena) =

Multi-purpose arena in Minneapolis, Minnesota

- "The Barnyard"
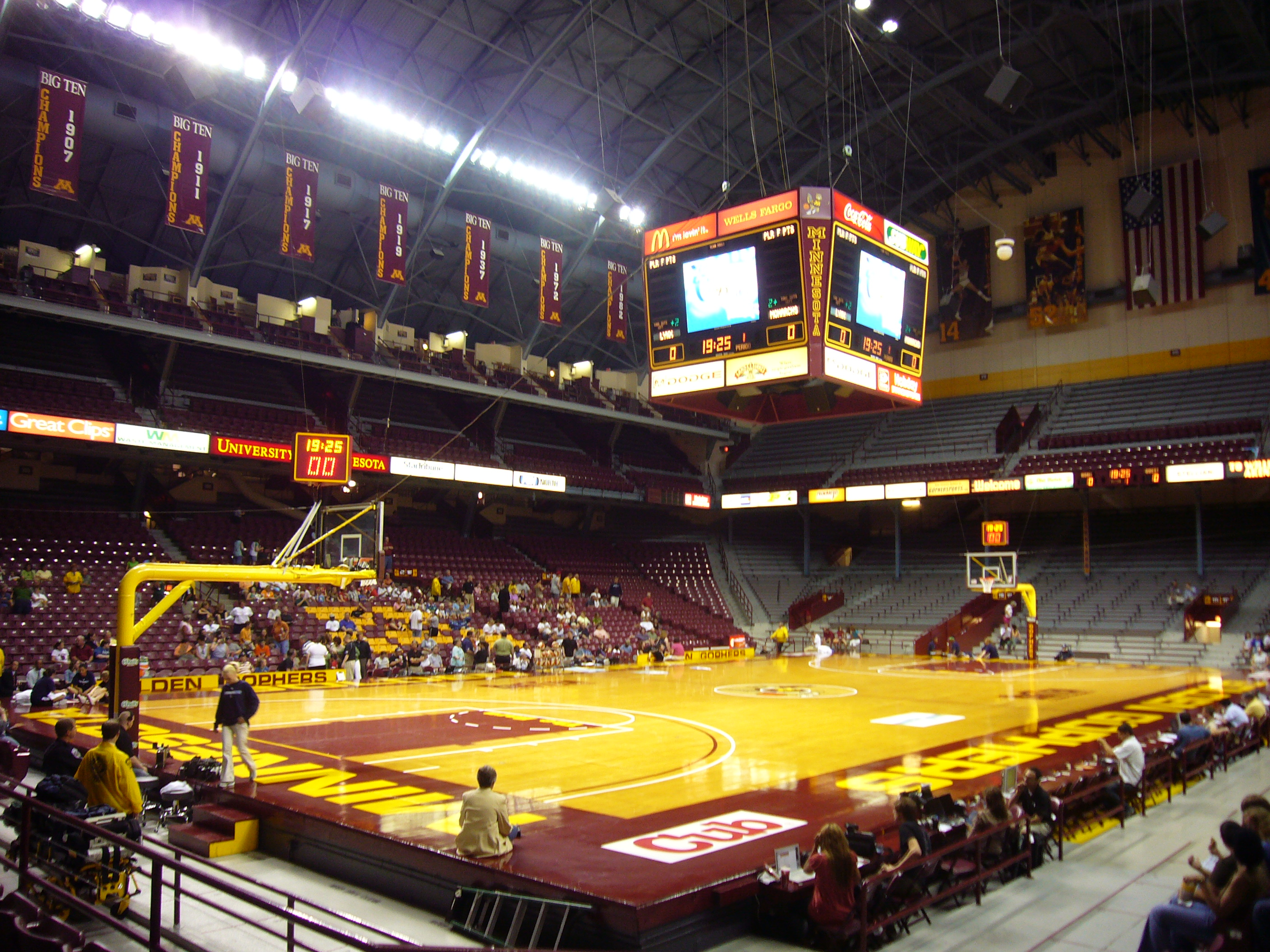
- July 7, 2007, before the Sacramento Monarchs vs Minnesota Lynx WNBA game

- Location in Minnesota Location in the United States
- Full name: The Barn by Blue Cross and Blue Shield of Minnesota
- Former names: Minnesota Field House (1928–1950); Williams Arena (1950-2026)
- Location: 1925 Southeast University Avenue; Minneapolis, Minnesota, U.S. 55455
- Coordinates: 44°58′37″N 93°13′42″W
- Owner: University of Minnesota
- Operator: University of Minnesota
- Capacity: 14,625 (arena proper); 5,700 (Maturi Pavilion)
- Surface: Multi-surface

Construction
- Groundbreaking: May 10, 1927
- Opened: February 4, 1928
- Renovated: 1950, 1993, 1997
- Cost: $650,000 ($12.2 million in 2025 dollars)
- Architects: Clarence H. Johnston, Sr. HGA/Hastings+Chivetta (renovations)
- Services engineer: Pillsbury Engineering Company
- General contractor: Madsen Construction Company

Tenants
- Minnesota men's basketball Minnesota women's basketball 1951 NCAA Division I men's basketball tournament

The Barn by Blue Cross and Blue Shield of Minnesota (opened as Minnesota Field House and formerly known as Williams Arena) is an indoor arena located in Minneapolis, Minnesota, United States. It is the home arena for the University of Minnesota's men's and women's basketball teams. It also housed the men's hockey team until 1993, when it moved into its own building, 3M Arena at Mariucci. The building is popularly known as The Barn, and its student section is known as "The Barnyard".

The Barn is located on the southwest corner of the intersection of University Avenue and 19th Ave. SE in Minneapolis on the university's East Bank campus. It is in a neighborhood called Stadium Village, named for the old Memorial Stadium that stood there until its demolition in 1992. The arena is adjacent to Huntington Bank Stadium, 3M Arena at Mariucci and Ridder Arena, where the football and men's and women's hockey teams respectively play.

== History ==
When the Gophers basketball team first organized, they played games in the on-campus YMCA. In 1896, the team moved into the campus Armory, a large building with gymnasium space for the team to use, even if basketball was not its primary purpose. The Gophers remained in the Armory for almost 30 years. Halfway through the 1924–25 season, coach Harold Taylor moved the team from the University Armory to the Kenwood Armory in downtown Minneapolis. This significantly increased the attendance: capacity at the University Armory was 2,000, but it was 6,500 at Kenwood. The team only played at Kenwood for a few seasons, however, as the University of Minnesota Field House (later known as The Barn) opened partway through the 1927–1928 season. The team moved in on January 31, 1928.

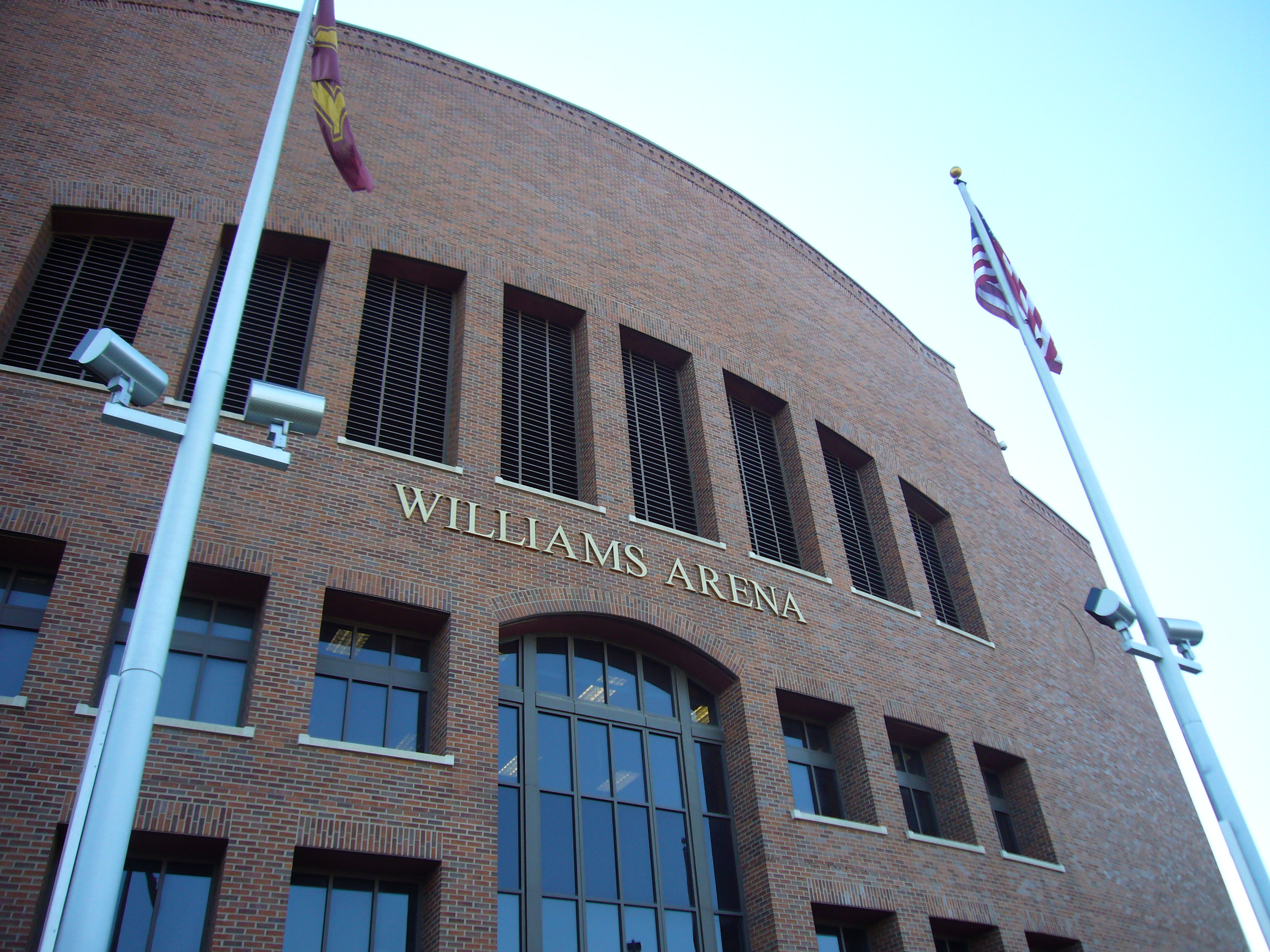
The entrance

Initially known as the Minnesota Field House (a name now used for a different building), The Barn opened in 1928. The original construction of the arena cost $650,000. The arena was remodeled in 1950, and renamed Williams Arena after Henry L. Williams, the football coach from 1900 to 1921.

As part of the 1950 renovation, it was divided into two separate arenas within one building: a larger one for basketball and a smaller one for hockey. Both arenas were called Williams Arena until March 2, 1985, when the hockey section was renamed Mariucci Arena after longtime Gopher hockey coach John Mariucci. The hockey team moved into a new building across the street from Williams in 1993, also named Mariucci Arena. The old Mariucci Arena within Williams was remodeled into the Sports Pavilion, now the Maturi Pavilion, named for former University of Minnesota athletic director Joel Maturi in August 2017, which houses the volleyball, wrestling, and gymnastic teams.

The venue hosted the 1951 NCAA Division I men's basketball tournament championship game and the 1964 NCAA Division I men's basketball tournament Mideast Regional. The Barn has hosted the 1st and 2nd rounds of the NCAA women's basketball tournament in 2005, 2007, 2010, and 2026. The hockey portion of Williams hosted the Frozen Four in 1958 and 1966. The Minnesota Lynx played all of their 2017 postseason home games at The Barn, ultimately winning the franchise's fourth WNBA championship in the building.

On June 12, 2026, the University announced that the name of the arena portion of the facility would become The Barn by Blue Cross and Blue Shield of Minnesota as part of multi-year partnership between the two entities. The Maturi Pavillion portion remains unaffected.

The Barn was used for the filming of scenes in the 1978 film, Ice Castles.

== Design ==
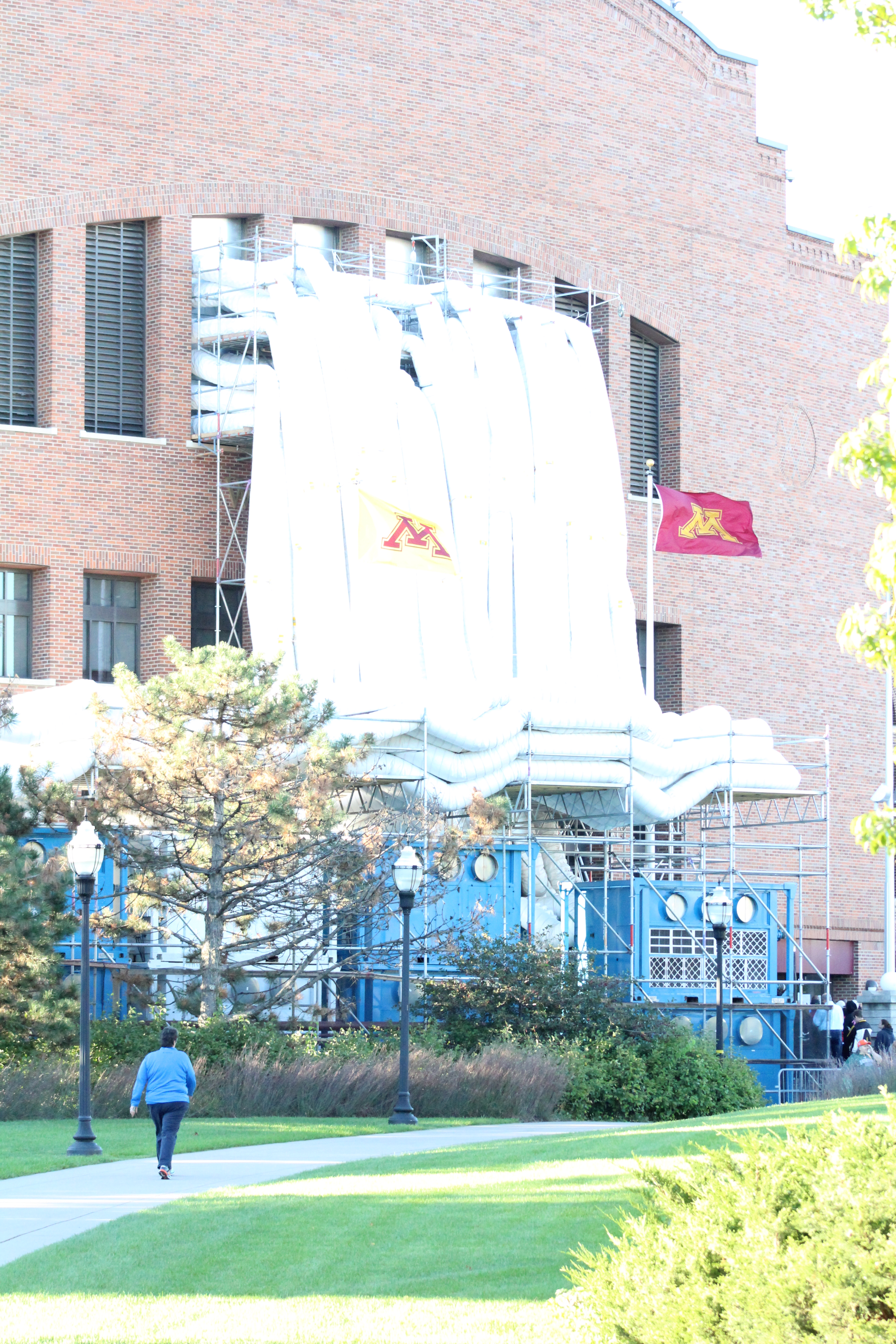
Temporary air conditioning was required for the 2017 WNBA Finals so the arena would meet WNBA temperature standards.

The building has an arched roof, in the same manner as an airplane hangar. The double arch steel beams allows an open space for the bleachers and floor. There are some seats with partially obscured views due to the upper deck extending past the trusses. Over the summer of 2012, a new Daktronics videoboard and fascia displays were installed as part of a sporting facility update, replacing the older board. The new board is 11'7"x13'8" with LED rings above and below the main display. The fascia extends 360° around the arena.

New videoboard installed prior to the 2012-13 season

=== Raised floor ===
Harvard Crimson women's basketball players sitting on the bench below the elevated floor during a game at Williams Arena in 2026

The Barn features an unusual raised floor design. The court surface is raised above the ground approximately two feet so that team benches and scorer's table are below the court. (An LED advertising panel has been added in recent years on the floor above the scorer's table, similar to the setup at most other arenas. The panel at Williams is shallow and angled upwards so it does not obscure the sightline of those seated at the table.) The same goes for fans with the first row, who look at players at about knee-level. Normally, other than the officials and those players actively playing, only head coaches are allowed to be on the court itself. The raised floor is one of only a few remaining in the United States and contributes to the historic aura of the 90-year-old arena. This served as the inspiration for the NCAA Tournament's Final Four, which in recent years has often set its court above the stadium floor.

The floor in The Barn was changed in 2009, replacing the original playing surface from 1928 with a new floor along with new baskets. This was the first major upgrade to the facility since a renovation occurred in the early 1990s. Memorial Gymnasium at Vanderbilt University and Hinkle Fieldhouse at Butler University are two other existing arenas with a raised floor.

With the advent of video replay review in college basketball, the raised floor and lower scorer's table at The Barn has presented a unique problem. Elsewhere an angled monitor is placed on top of the scorer's table for the officials to view replay footage and determine calls. However, with the scorer's table technically located at the officials' feet, this setup is not feasible for Minnesota games. Whenever a replay review is needed, an athletics staffer comes onto the court and must physically hold up the monitor, control system/headsets, and the microphone used by officials to announce their final decision over the public address system and to television viewers.

=== Seating capacity ===
From 1950 until the opening of Marriott Center at Brigham Young University in 1971, it had the largest capacity of any collegiate basketball arena in the country. Hinkle Fieldhouse at Butler University also was constructed in 1928, and held the honor of being the highest capacity arena until the remodeling of The Barn in 1950.

Seating capacity
1928–1950	14,100
1950–1971	18,025
1971–1987	17,500
1987–1993	16,434
1993–1997	14,321
1997–present	14,625

== See also ==
- List of NCAA Division I basketball arenas

Preceded by Madison Square Garden	NCAA Men's Division I Basketball Tournament; Finals Venue; 1951	Succeeded by Hec Edmundson Pavilion
Preceded by Broadmoor Ice Palace; Colorado Springs, Colorado	Host of the Frozen Four; 1958	Succeeded by RPI Field House; Troy, New York
Preceded by Meehan Auditorium; Providence, Rhode Island	Host of the Frozen Four; 1966	Succeeded by Onondaga War Memorial; Syracuse, New York
