= Minnesota Golden Gophers men's basketball =

NCAA Division I men's basketball program

2026–27 Minnesota Golden Gophers men's basketball team
- University: University of Minnesota
- First season: 1895–96; 131 years ago
- Athletic director: Mark Coyle
- Head coach: Niko Medved; 2nd season, 21–18 (.538)
- Location: Minneapolis, Minnesota
- Arena: The Barn (capacity: 14,625)
- NCAA division: Division I
- Conference: Big Ten
- Nickname: Golden Gophers
- Colors: Maroon and gold
- Student section: The Barnyard
- All-time record: 1,748–1,335–2 (.567)
- NCAA tournament record: 14–14 (.500)

NCAA Division I tournament Final Four
- 1997*
Other NCAA Division I tournament results
Elite Eight	1990, 1997*
Sweet Sixteen	1972*, 1982, 1989, 1990, 1997*
Appearances	1972*, 1982, 1989, 1990, 1994*, 1995*, 1997*, 1999, 2005, 2009, 2010, 2013, 2017, 2019

Pre-tournament Helms national champions
- 1901–02, 1918–19

NIT champions
- 1993, 2014

Conference regular-season champions
- Big Ten: 1906, 1907, 1911, 1917, 1919, 1937, 1972, 1982, 1997*

Uniforms
Home	Away	Alternate
- * vacated by NCAA

The Minnesota Golden Gophers men's basketball team represents the University of Minnesota in NCAA Division I college basketball competition. The Golden Gophers competes in the Big Ten Conference and play their home games at The Barn.

The Gophers had great success in the early years of basketball, but have been largely overshadowed by other programs since the end of World War I. In total, the Gophers have won nine Big Ten championships, but only four since 1919. The Helms Athletic Foundation retroactively named Minnesota as national champions in 1902 and 1919, and the Premo-Porretta Power Poll has listed Minnesota as the top team in 1903. While the NCAA does not officially recognize Premo-Porretta, it lists the Helms champions in the annual Official NCAA Men's Basketball Records Book, and Minnesota claims the two Helms designations as national championships.

The team has also had several instances of NCAA sanctions on the program that have affected performance and recruiting. In the 1970s, the Gophers were in a violent brawl with the Ohio State Buckeyes and were barred from post-season appearances for two seasons after an incident involving the illegal resale of tickets. Still more severe was the mid-1990s academic scandal under then-coach Clem Haskins that resulted in the forfeit of a Final Four appearance.

== Coaches ==
Initially, the Gophers team formed without any organized coach. Despite this setback, in the team's first recorded match, they scraped out a 5-4 victory against an opponent christened only as "Company A." They would finish their first season with a 3-5 record. L. J. Cooke took over the team in 1897. Cooke was put on the university payroll on a part-time basis in early 1897 and full-time by the fall; this made him one of the earliest professional coaches.

Cooke remained the coach of the Gophers for 28 seasons, and his .649 winning percentage is the second highest in school history. Dave MacMillan, who coached the team from 1927 to 1942 and 1945 to 1948, had the second longest tenure as coach at 18 seasons. John Wooden almost succeeded McMillan as Gophers head coach; Wooden claims that a dispute over retaining McMillan as an assistant coach and a delayed phone call led him to accept the job at UCLA instead.

The Gophers have had several NBA coaches grace the sidelines. John Kundla took over as Gophers head coach after the Minneapolis Lakers departed for Los Angeles. George Hanson was assistant coach under both Kundla and Fitch and was head coach for the 1970–71 season. Bill Fitch and Bill Musselman both coached the team for a couple seasons before departing for the NBA and ABA respectively, where each had success and coached for many years.

The program has had a fair degree of stability with their coaching staff. Tubby Smith became the 16th head coach in Gopher basketball history when hired in 2007; this total includes interim coaches Jim Molinari and Jimmy Williams. Five coaches led the team for more than 10 seasons: Cooke, McMillan, O. B. Cowles, Jim Dutcher, and Clem Haskins. On March 25, 2013, Tubby Smith was fired after failing to reach the Sweet Sixteen again. The Gophers hired Richard Pitino on April 3, 2013. He was fired on March 15, 2021, after eight seasons, and replaced the following week by former assistant coach and seasoned recruiter, Ben Johnson.

== Players ==
The Golden Gophers have had many successful players come through the program throughout its history. In the early years of basketball, when the Gophers had success, they recruited some of the best players in the country. George Tuck was a dominant center, and the first All-America for the Gophers in 1905. Frank Lawler was another early star: he led the Big Ten in scoring in 1911 and was also named to the All-America team, and helped the Gophers to a contested conference title.

In 1950, Lawler was named the greatest player in Gopher basketball history, but the subsequent decades of Gopher basketball have largely forgotten his legacy. Hall of Fame coach John Kundla was also a Gophers star and helped lead the team to its 1937 Big Ten Championship.

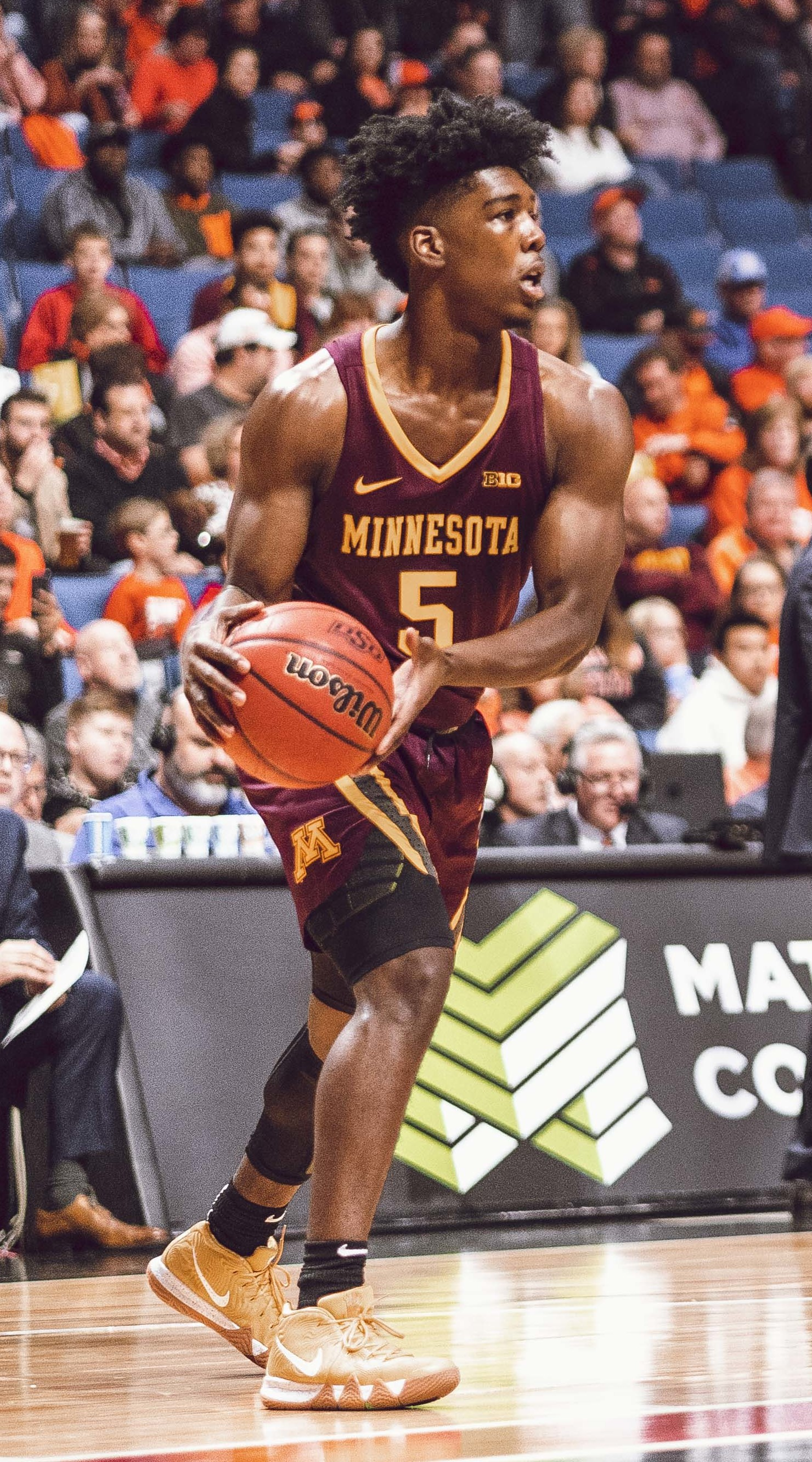
Marcus Carr

With the decline of the stature of the Gophers program, fewer elite players have joined the team. The diminished reputation has not, however, prevented some superior athletes from coming to the Minneapolis campus. Lou Hudson played for 13 years in the NBA and had his number retired. Baseball Hall of Famer Dave Winfield played for the Gophers in the early 1970s, and he played at the same time as star post player Jim Brewer. Mychal Thompson was a Gophers star and was the first overall pick in the 1978 NBA draft. Among Thompson's teammates were former Minnesota Timberwolves, Detroit Pistons and Washington Wizards head coach Flip Saunders, as well as Naismith Memorial Basketball Hall of Fame forward Kevin McHale. Trent Tucker led the 1982 squad to the Big Ten Championship. Voshon Lenard was a key player for the Gophers in the early 1990s and went on to play more than a decade in the NBA. Willie Burton once scored 53 points in an NBA game with the Philadelphia 76ers.

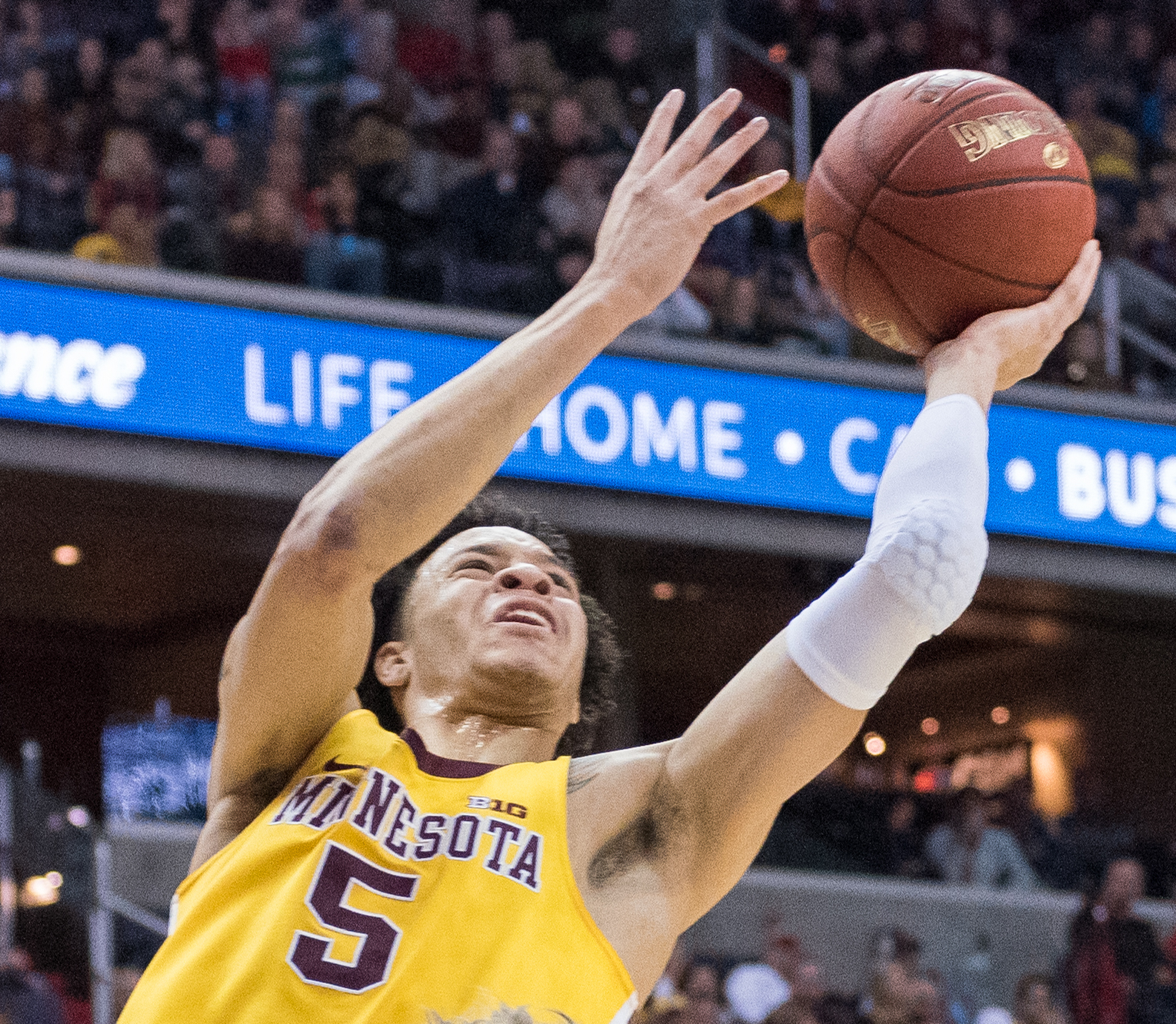
Amir Coffey in 2017.

Other former Gophers with long NBA careers include Randy Breuer, Mark Olberding, Archie Clark, Jim Petersen, and Ray Williams. Five players from the 1997 Final Four team played in the NBA: Bobby Jackson, Sam Jacobson, Quincy Lewis, John Thomas, and Trevor Winter. Amir Coffey (Los Angeles Clippers) is a former Gopher who played in the NBA, and now plays in the Israeli Basketball Premier League. Jamal Abu-Shamala, a Palestinian-American, played internationally for the Jordan national basketball team in 2008 and the Palestine national basketball team in 2015 and 2020, and Marcus Carr plays overseas in the Israeli Basketball Premier League.

=== Current roster ===
This roster is current for the 2024–25 men's basketball season.

2024–25 Minnesota Golden Gophers men's basketball team
Players
Coaches

Pos.	#	Name	Height	Weight	Year	Previous school	Hometown
F	00	Frank Mitchell	6 ft 8 in (2.03 m)	260 lb (118 kg)	RS Jr	Oakville Prep; Canisius	Toronto, ON
G	1	Isaac Asuma	6 ft 3 in (1.91 m)	196 lb (89 kg)	Fr	Cherry	Cherry, MN
G	2	Mike Mitchell Jr.	6 ft 2 in (1.88 m)	185 lb (84 kg)	Sr	Archbishop Mitty; Pepperdine	San Jose, CA
F	3	Dawson Garcia	6 ft 11 in (2.11 m)	234 lb (106 kg)	Sr	Prior Lake; North Carolina	Savage, MN
F	4	Kadyn Betts	6 ft 8 in (2.03 m)	225 lb (102 kg)	RS So	Central	Pueblo, CO
F/C	5	Trey Edmonds	6 ft 10 in (2.08 m)	250 lb (113 kg)	Sr	George Washington; UTSA	Aurora, CO
G	6	Caleb Williams	6 ft 2 in (1.88 m)	200 lb (91 kg)	Sr	Wild Rose; Macalester College	Wild Rose, WI
G	7	Max Sheridan (W)	6 ft 0 in (1.83 m)	175 lb (79 kg)	So	St. Monica Prep	Los Angeles, CA
F	10	Grayson Grove (redshirt)	6 ft 9 in (2.06 m)	220 lb (100 kg)	Fr	Alexandria	Alexandria, MN
G	11	Femi Odukale	6 ft 6 in (1.98 m)	215 lb (98 kg)	GS	Springfield Commonwealth; New Mexico State	Brooklyn, NY
F	12	Erick Reader (W)	6 ft 8 in (2.03 m)	215 lb (98 kg)	So	New Life Academy	Bloomington, MN
F	23	Parker Fox	6 ft 8 in (2.03 m)	220 lb (100 kg)	GS	Mahtomedi; Northern State	Mahtomedi, MN
G	24	Brennan Rigsby	6 ft 3 in (1.91 m)	185 lb (84 kg)	Sr	Wasatch Academy; Oregon	De Beque, CO
G	25	Lu'Cye Patterson	6 ft 2 in (1.88 m)	202 lb (92 kg)	RS Sr	Minnesota Prep; Charlotte	Minneapolis, MN
G	28	Tyler Cochran	6 ft 3 in (1.91 m)	225 lb (102 kg)	Sr	Bolingbrook; Toledo	Bolingbrook, IL
F	54	Lincoln Meister (W)	6 ft 9 in (2.06 m)	240 lb (109 kg)	GS	John Marshall; Minnesota Duluth	Rochester, MN

Head coach

- Niko Medved (Minnesota)

Assistant coach(es)

- Dave Thorson (Hamline)
- Jason Kemp (UW–La Crosse)
- Marcus Jenkins (Air Force)
- Josh Adel (Florida)

Legend

- (C) Team captain
- (S) Suspended
- (I) Ineligible
- (W) Walk-on
- Injured
- Current redshirt

Roster
Last update: December 15, 2024

=== Retired numbers ===
Minnesota Golden Gophers retired numbers
No.	Player	Position	Year retired
14	Lou Hudson	SG, SF	1966
30	Chuck Mencel	PG	2011
32	Trent Tucker	SG	2009
34	Willie Burton	SF	2020
41	Whitey Skoog	G	2009
43	Mychal Thompson	PF, C	1978
44	Kevin McHale	PF, C	1980
45	Randy Breuer	C	2015
52	Jim Brewer	PF	1973
53	Dick Garmaker	G, SF	2011

== History ==
=== Program establishment (1895–1927) ===
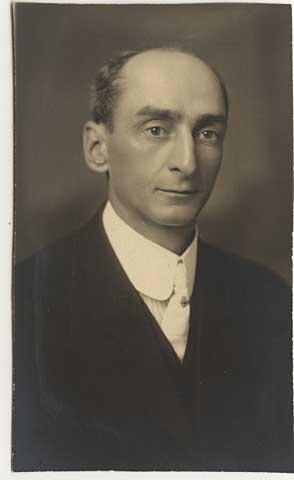
L. J. Cooke was the Gophers coach from 1897 to 1924.

The precise founding of the Gophers men's basketball program at the University of Minnesota is somewhat nebulous. Unlike many other universities with later foundations, the team did not form as a conscious act of the campus administration. The university's student newspaper at the time, the Ariel, reported on basketball throughout 1895 as the sport was introduced to the campus from a rival school, Minnesota A&M in St. Paul, later incorporated into the larger University of Minnesota Twin Cities. In 1896, a team from the school began to participate in a league with the Agriculture school, YMCA teams, and other local associations. The establishment of the Armory on-campus gave the team a new place to play. In February 1897, L. J. Cooke, a director of the Minneapolis YMCA, was hired on a part-time basis to coach the basketball program, and became the full-time coach and director of physical education by the fall of that year. Cooke was one of the first full-time professional coaches in all of college basketball and would remain at the program for 28 seasons.

Cooke began to improve the team significantly and was responsible for shifts in the Gophers' scheduling that foreshadowed other changes to come. The team never played a YMCA team after the 1903–04 season, and beginning in 1900, began to schedule large neighboring universities that would join Minnesota in Big Ten competition. This shift to playing similar competition helped the Gophers to become one of the premier programs in the nation. From the 1899–1900 to 1903–04 seasons, the Gophers had a 59–6 record. The 1901–02 squad has been retroactively named the national champions by the Helms Foundation, and the Premo-Porretta Power Poll retroactively listed the 1901-02 team and the 1902–03 team as the top teams for those two seasons. When the Big Ten established basketball in 1905, the Gophers won the first two conference titles.

After 1907, Cooke's dominance of the national basketball scene was greatly reduced. He led the team to two more conference titles (1916–17, 1918–19) and one retroactive national championship for the 1918–19 season, but the team was never the consistent winner that it was in the first decade under Cooke. He retired after the 1923–1924 season. His successor, Harold Taylor, was Cooke's assistant coach in his final season and had previously a successful high school coach; however, he had little success with the Gophers and was fired after never finishing higher than sixth in the conference in three forgettable seasons.

=== Dave MacMillan and beyond (1927–1959) ===
Following the firing of Harold Taylor as coach, the program underwent a national search for a successor. Many of the candidates for the job were high-profile coaches of other conference foes. The team opted, however, to hire Dave MacMillan, who had been coaching the University of Idaho for the previous seven seasons and had previously played for the Original Celtics during the 1910s. MacMillan would dominate the program for the next 30 years, coaching the team from 1927 to 1942 and again from 1945 to 1948.

MacMillan's teams in 1928 began to play in the University of Minnesota Field House, a new on-campus arena. Basketball had been off-campus for several seasons when the team moved downtown. MacMillan's teams had middling success. His 1930–31 and 1931–32 teams competed near the top of the Big Ten, but his teams dropped off again until 1936. John Kundla joined the team for the 1936–1937 season and helped the team to the Big Ten Championship, which was ended up being its last until 1972. MacMillan's squad also competed in a tournament in 1936 to represent the United States in the 1936 Summer Olympics in Berlin; the team advanced several rounds before being ousted by DePaul. Many Gophers players in this era were recruited from Minneapolis public high schools, and in some seasons this even constituted a majority of the roster. McMillan resigned in 1942, but returned in 1945 after three poor seasons for the Gophers in the interim. When he resigned for the second time in 1948, he was replaced by O. B. Cowles.

Cowles was known for playing slower tempo basketball like was most common in the 1920s and 1930s and was known as a defensive-minded coach, especially early in his career. His squads were led by two-time All-American Jim McIntyre and three-time NBA Champion Whitey Skoog for the early years of his career and Big Ten MVP Chuck Mencel for the middle ones. Another notable Gophers star from the era was Pro Football Hall of Fame coach Bud Grant. Cowles had a .612 winning percentage at the school. The Gophers were unable to win a Big Ten title, however, despite a solid nucleus in Cowles's early seasons. The team finished fourth or better in the conference seven times in Cowles's 11 seasons as Gopher head coach.

=== Kundla and Fitch (1959–1971) ===
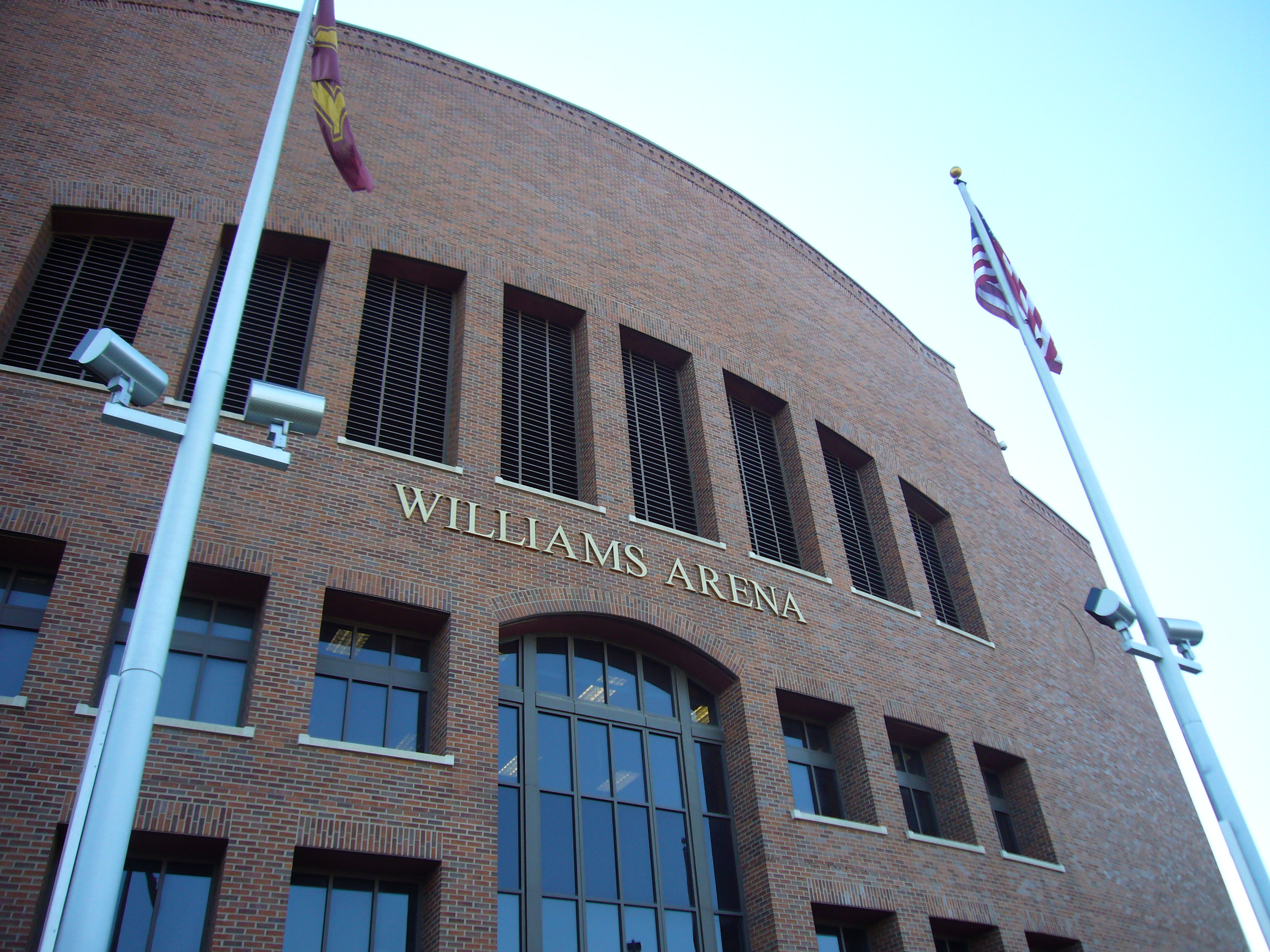
The Golden Gophers have played home games in Williams Arena since 1928.

In 1959, John Kundla stayed behind in Minneapolis as the Lakers prepared to leave town and succeeded O. B. Cowles as head coach of the Golden Gophers. Kundla remained head coach until 1968. In 1963, he broke the color barrier in the Minnesota program and recruited three African-American players to come to the school. One of these first three players was Lou Hudson, who played in the NBA and was the first Gopher to have his number retired by the school. The other two players recruited by Kundla, Archie Clark and Don Yates, also were both drafted by NBA teams. That trio helped the Gophers to a third place Big Ten finish in 1963–64 and a second-place finish in 1964–65, but those were the high points for Kundla's collegiate career. Kundla's personal assessment of his Gophers career was that his personal weaknesses in recruiting were marring the team by the end of his tenure.

Kundla was succeeded by Bowling Green head coach Bill Fitch. Fitch remained with the Gophers for two seasons before being hired by the Cleveland Cavaliers as their first head coach in 1970 to make the leap to the NBA, where he later won an NBA title as coach of the Boston Celtics. Fitch did recruit Jim Brewer before he left, laying the first seed for the 1972 Big Ten title. George Hanson, a longtime assistant coach at the school, was hired as his replacement, but resigned after only one season.

=== Musselman and NCAA sanctions (1971–1975) ===
The Gophers under Athletics Director Marsh Ryman hired Cal Luther away from Murray State to coach the team in 1971, but he changed his mind and turned the team down after accepting the position. Instead, Bill Musselman took over the program. Musselman was a defensive minded coach and designed his team around Brewer, recruiting several junior college players. University of Minnesota baseball star Dave Winfield also joined the team in 1971. The starters on the 1971–72 squad after the Ohio State game became known as the "Iron Five." Musselman's strategy succeeded, and the team took the Big Ten title, the first since 1937. The other Big Ten coaches did not approve of Musselman's recruiting posture as they all had gathered and agreed not to recruit Ron Behagen into the Big Ten because he was known as a troublemaker. Musselman had not been named Head Coach of Minnesota at that time and therefore was unaware of the internal agreement and therefore recruited what he thought were the best players available.

In 1973, former player Greg Olson accused Musselman of having attempted to strike him in a practice. It was also revealed that Olson had sold complimentary season tickets to a booster named Harvey Mackay, which prompted NCAA investigations. Musselman's coaching style also brought about significant transfers away from the Minnesota program to other schools. In 1975, Musselman resigned and was named the head coach of the San Diego Sails of the ABA. After his resignation, Musselman admitted to giving money to players for rent and transportation. These charges, coupled with the earlier ticket selling scandal and other transgressions regarding payments and aid revolving around Harvey Mackay, resulted in a list from the NCAA of more than 100 rule violations in Musselman's four seasons at the school. The extent of the consequences would not be known until early in Jim Dutcher's eleven season tenure as Gophers head coach.

=== The Jim Dutcher era (1975-1986) ===
Dutcher took over the Gophers program in 1975 following the departure of Bill Musselman. The highlight of his time at Minnesota was 1982, a season in which he led the Gophers to the Big Ten Championship — to date, the last "official" conference title for the Gophers — and a Sweet 16 appearance. He was named the Big Ten Coach of the Year in 1982.

Prominent players coached by Dutcher at Minnesota included Ray Williams, who later played for the New York Knicks; Mychal Thompson, who played for the Portland Trail Blazers and Los Angeles Lakers; Kevin McHale, who played for the Boston Celtics; Trent Tucker, who played for the New York Knicks and Chicago Bulls; Randy Breuer, who played for the Milwaukee Bucks, Minnesota Timberwolves, Atlanta Hawks and Sacramento Kings; Flip Saunders, who became an NBA coach for the Minnesota Timberwolves, Detroit Pistons, and Washington Wizards; Osborne Lockhart, who played for the Harlem Globetrotters; Jim Petersen, who played for the Houston Rockets; Darrell Mitchell, who was named first-team All-Big Ten, and Tommy Davis, also a first-team All-Big Ten player.

On January 25, 1986, three Gopher players were arrested on rape charges in Madison, Wisconsin. A Madison woman claimed the players raped her at their team hotel hours after the Gophers played the Wisconsin Badgers. After the arrests, U of M officials canceled the Gophers' next scheduled game, against Northwestern, citing the arrests and a series of less serious incidents prior to the arrests. Not agreeing with the university's decision to forfeit the game, Dutcher resigned as head coach, Jimmy Williams served as the interim coach the rest of the season. All three players were ultimately acquitted of all charges.

=== Success, and scandal, under Haskins (1986–1999) ===
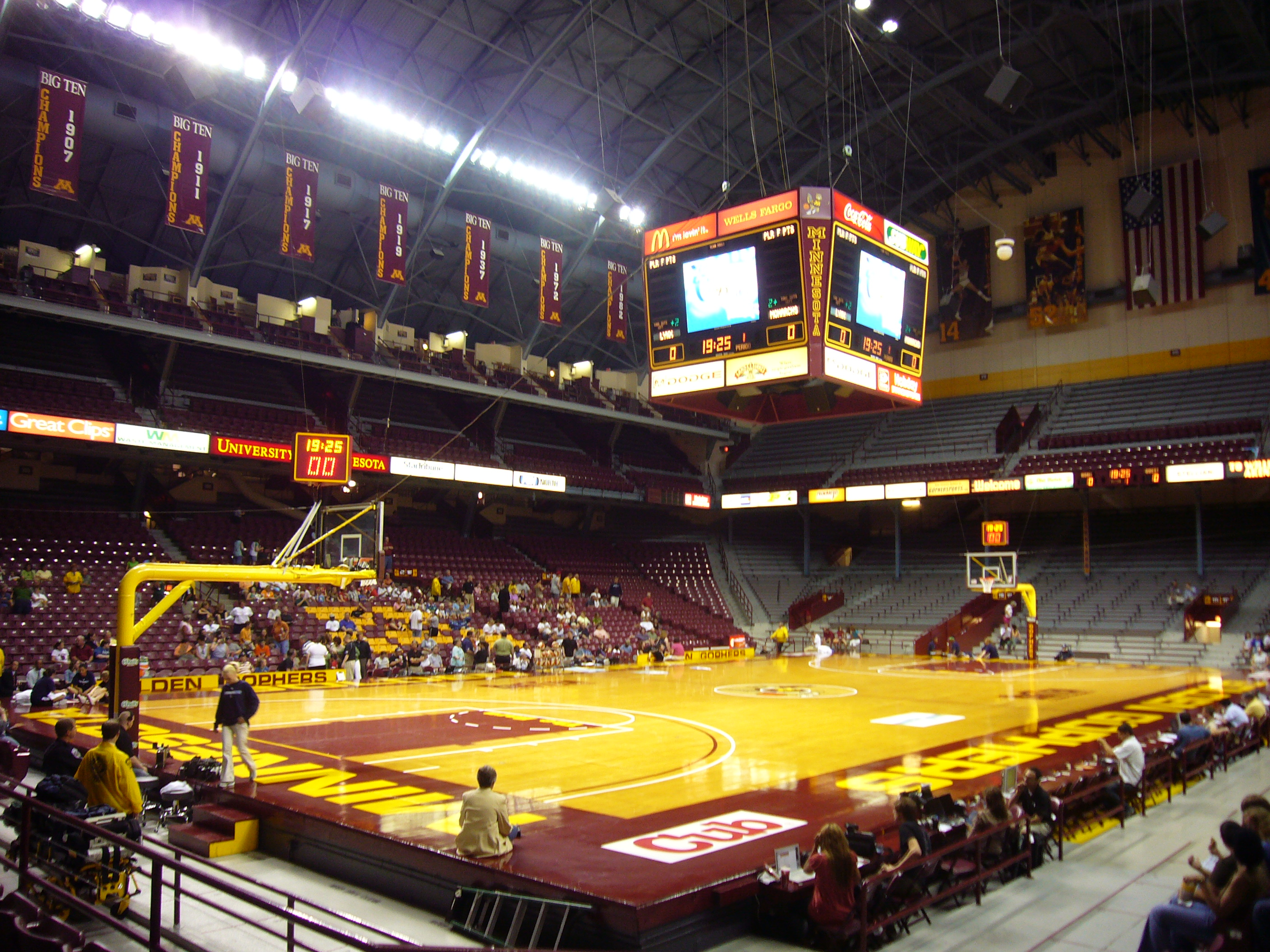
The court of Williams Arena

Clem Haskins was hired as the Gopher basketball coach in 1986, expected to clean up and rebuild the Gopher program which had been torn apart by the Madison sexual assault allegations (of which the players were later acquitted) during the final year of coach Jim Dutcher. Though wins did not come easily in the first couple years of Haskins regime, by the 1988–89 season he had the Gophers in the 1989 NCAA Division I men's basketball tournament as a #11 seed, and directed a Cinderella run into the Sweet 16. In the 1989–90 season Haskins led the Gophers on another cinderella run in the 1990 NCAA Division I men's basketball tournament. This time as a No. 6 seed, the Gophers went all the way to the Elite Eight, and came within a basket of reaching their first ever Final Four. Though Haskins led the Gophers to post-season success in his first three seasons, the 1990 Elite Eight appearance would be the last time under Haskins the Gophers would "officially" appear in the NCAA tournament, due to their future tournament results being vacated as a result of NCAA violations.

Prominent players coached by Haskins at Minnesota included Minnesota native Sam Jacobson, who went on to play for the Los Angeles Lakers, Golden State Warriors, and hometown Minnesota Timberwolves, Sharp-shooter Voshon Lenard, who spent 5 seasons with the Miami Heat and won the 2004 Three-Point Contest, Quincy Lewis, who was a 3rd Team All American and played for the Utah Jazz and Minnesota Timberwolves, and Bobby Jackson who under Haskins was a Consensus All American and Big Ten Player Of The Year, before going on to play 12 seasons in the NBA, most prominently for the Sacramento Kings, where he won the 2003 Sixth Man of the Year Award, and now serves as an assistant coach. Big men John Thomas, Joel Przybilla, and Trevor Winter (the latter two both Minnesota natives), also flourished under Haskins and went on to have careers in the NBA.

==== Academic fraud scandal ====
On March 10, 1999, the day before the #7 seed Gophers were to open the NCAA tournament against #10 Gonzaga, the St. Paul Pioneer Press ran a story detailing allegations of massive academic fraud in the men's basketball program. Former basketball office manager Jan Gangelhoff had gone to the newspaper claiming she had written over 400 papers for at least 20 Gopher men's basketball players over a period of several years, ending in 1998. When the Gophers played Gonzaga on March 11, the university suspended players Antoine Broxsie, Kevin Clark, Jason Stanford, and Miles Tarver since they allegedly had papers written for them by Ganglehoff in previous seasons. With their roster depleted, the Gophers lost to Gonzaga, the season came to an end, and an internal investigation at the university began.

By June 1999 and in the midst of their investigation, the university had negotiated a buyout of the remainder of Haskins' contract, worth $1.5 million over three years. It also withdrew from postseason consideration in the 1999–2000 season and docked itself 11 scholarships over four years. In the summer of 2000, Haskins came forward and admitted that he had paid Gangelhoff $3,000 for her services; this revelation came to light after Haskins turned his financial records over to the NCAA. In addition, more details were emerging in which Haskins was also accused of mail fraud in an incident regarding a recruit's transcript, giving players cash, dismissing sexual harassment concerns against his players, as well as his staff trying to persuade professors to give his players inflated grades they had not earned.

Stripped banners and records
Season	Banner/Record
1993–94	NCAA tournament 2nd round
1994–95	NCAA tournament 1st round
1995–96	NIT 2nd round
1996–97	NCAA Final Four
1996–97	Big Ten MVP Bobby Jackson
1996–97	Big Ten Defensive POY: Bobby Jackson
1997–98	NIT Champions
1998–99	NCAA tournament 1st round

After the details of Haskins' ever-growing involvement became more clear, the university initiated legal action to recover the buyout money. A judge ultimately ruled that Haskins must return just over half of the original $1.5 million buyout.

During this time an NCAA investigation was also underway. Ultimately, it revealed that Minnesota was guilty of massive violations under Haskins' watch. The NCAA stripped the Gophers of all postseason awards, titles, personal records, and statistics dating back to the 1993–94 season citing a "lack of institutional control." Haskins was also slapped with a seven-year "show-cause" order, which effectively banned him from coaching at any level in the NCAA until 2007. Besides lying about the $3,000 payment, he had also told several of his players to lie to the NCAA. Later, the Big Ten forced the Gophers to vacate their 1997 conference title, as well as all regular season games dating to 1993–94. As a result, Minnesota's official record from 1993–94 to 1998–99 is 0–0. If not for the vacated games, Haskins would be the second-winningest coach in school history.

In addition, the NCAA docked the Gophers an additional five scholarships over the following three seasons, and also imposed recruiting limitations and department-wide probation lasting four years.

In addition to Haskins, Athletic Director Mark Dienhart, Vice President for Athletics, Student Development McKinley Boston, Associate Athletics Director Jeff Schemmel and academic counselor Alonzo Newby also resigned. The university also agreed to return 90% (approximately $350,000) of the profits earned by the basketball program during their appearances in the NCAA tournament, including the 1997 Final Four run.

=== The Monson era (1999–2006) ===
Following Haskins' departure, the university hired Gonzaga's Dan Monson to be their next head coach, who coincidentally had just beaten the Gophers in the NCAA Tournament the previous March. Monson was the coach for part of eight seasons. However, during his tenure the scholarship reductions took their full effect, making it difficult for him to recruit on the same level as the rest of the Big Ten. His Gopher teams only made the NCAA tournament once, in 2004–05. Monson almost left the Minnesota program for the University of Washington following the 2001–02 season, but was thought of highly by the athletics department under Tom Moe and was persuaded to stay despite limited success. These trends did not reverse after he remained at the program.

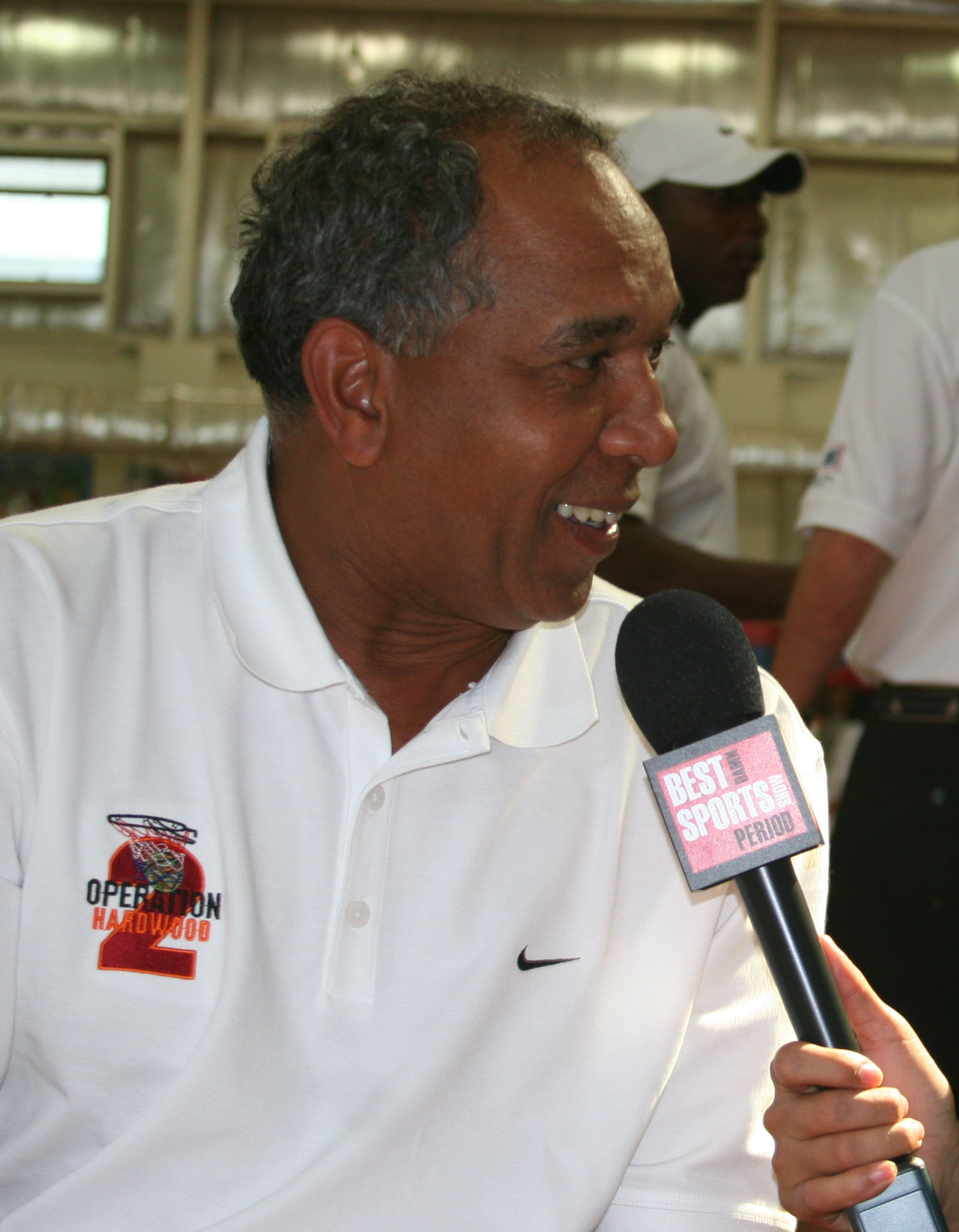
Former Gophers coach Tubby Smith

During his final full season the Gophers were 5–11 in Big Ten play, and after a 2–5 start to open the 2006–07 season, Monson and Athletics Director Joel Maturi announced Monson's resignation on November 30, 2006. Despite Monson's inability to field a consistent winner, he was lauded by University officials for bringing integrity and cleanliness back to the program. Assistant coach Jim Molinari was named head coach on an interim basis and, after a 3–13 Big Ten record to finish the season, was not retained as head coach. Maturi began an extensive search for a new permanent head coach at season's end.

=== The Tubby Smith era (2007–2013) ===
On March 23, 2007, Maturi made a move that surprised many when he hired Tubby Smith after he resigned from the University of Kentucky to be the next head Gopher basketball coach. Smith's name recognition and winning reputation gave the program a new optimism, something it badly needed to counter its dwindling fan interest.

Smith's coaching had an immediate impact on the previously unsuccessful Gophers squad. The team went from 8–22 in 2006–07 to 20–13 in 2007–08. Smith also led the Golden Gophers to the Big Ten tournament semi-finals after defeating 2nd seeded Indiana. Coach Smith also signed a top 25 recruiting class, the best in years for the program. Smith returned Minnesota to the NCAA tournament for the first time since 2005 in the 2008–09 season. Smith's team struggled throughout the 2009–10 season with off-court issues, but advanced to the championship game in the Big Ten tournament for the first time in school history (losing to regular season co-champion Ohio State) and made the NCAA tournament for the second consecutive season.

On March 25, 2013, Smith was relieved of his coaching duties at Minnesota.

=== The Richard Pitino era (2013–2021) ===
On April 3, 2013, Richard Pitino, son of Louisville coach Rick Pitino, verbally agreed to coach the Golden Gophers. On April 3, after missing out on the NCAA tournament, the Gophers responded by winning the 2014 NIT championship trophy by defeating SMU. Austin Hollins was named the NIT MVP. As a result, Pitino claimed his first championship with the team. Following the success of an NIT championship, the Gophers hoped to qualify for the NCAA tournament the following year. However, the team struggled and finished with only six wins in the conference and did not qualify for any major tournament.

The 2016 season was a disaster for the Gophers as they only managed to win two conference games. The lone bright spot came during a late season upset against ranked Maryland to give the Gophers their first conference win on the season. Despite the lack of success on the court, the Gophers were able to get Amir Coffey, a highly ranked player from Hopkins to commit to the men's basketball program. Coffey, along with other recruits Eric Curry and Michael Hurt, were able to help lift the Gophers to a 23-8 regular season record in the 2016–2017 season, and a berth to the 2017 NCAA tournament, where they attained a 5 seed and lost to 12-seed Middle Tennessee State to finish with a 24–10 record.

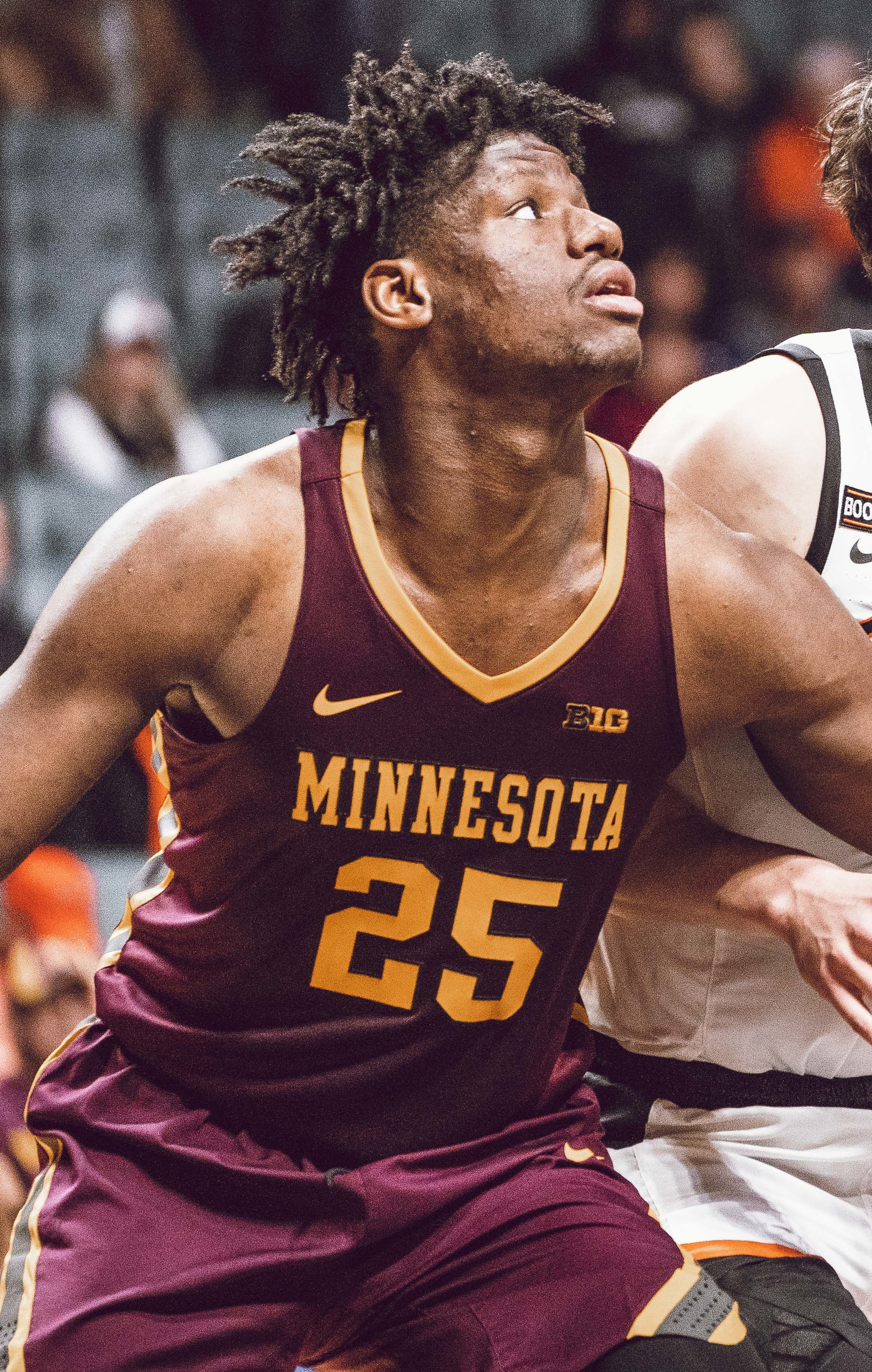
Daniel Oturu, 2019.

Expectations were high coming into the 2017–2018 season, as they only lost one rotational player, Akeem Springs, from the year before. This was evident as Minnesota received its highest preseason ranking in the AP poll since 1993, coming in at 15th. Before the season, things started to unravel for Pitino's team. Sophomore Eric Curry tore his ACL and MCL in late August, forcing him to miss the entirety of the 2017–2018 season. During the beginning of the season, sexual assault allegations came out against senior center Reggie Lynch, which resulted in Lynch's suspension and eventual expulsion from the University of Minnesota. Later in the season, sophomore Amir Coffey suffered a shoulder injury and ended up missing the last 12 games of the season. The Gophers ended the season 15–17, with a 4–14 record in conference play and a first round loss to Rutgers in the 2018 Big Ten tournament. The 2018–2019 season went much better for the Gophers. They finished with a record of 22–13, although they only went 9–11 in conference play. Still, after strong wins over No. 20 Wisconsin, and No. 11 Purdue twice, the Gophers finished 4th in the 2019 Big Ten tournament and returned to post-season play as a 10 seed in the East Region of the 2019 NCAA tournament. In the tournament, the Gophers beat the 7 seed Louisville Cardinals in the first round 86–76. In the Round of 32, the Gophers lost to the Michigan State Spartans 70–50, who would end up the champions of the East Region.

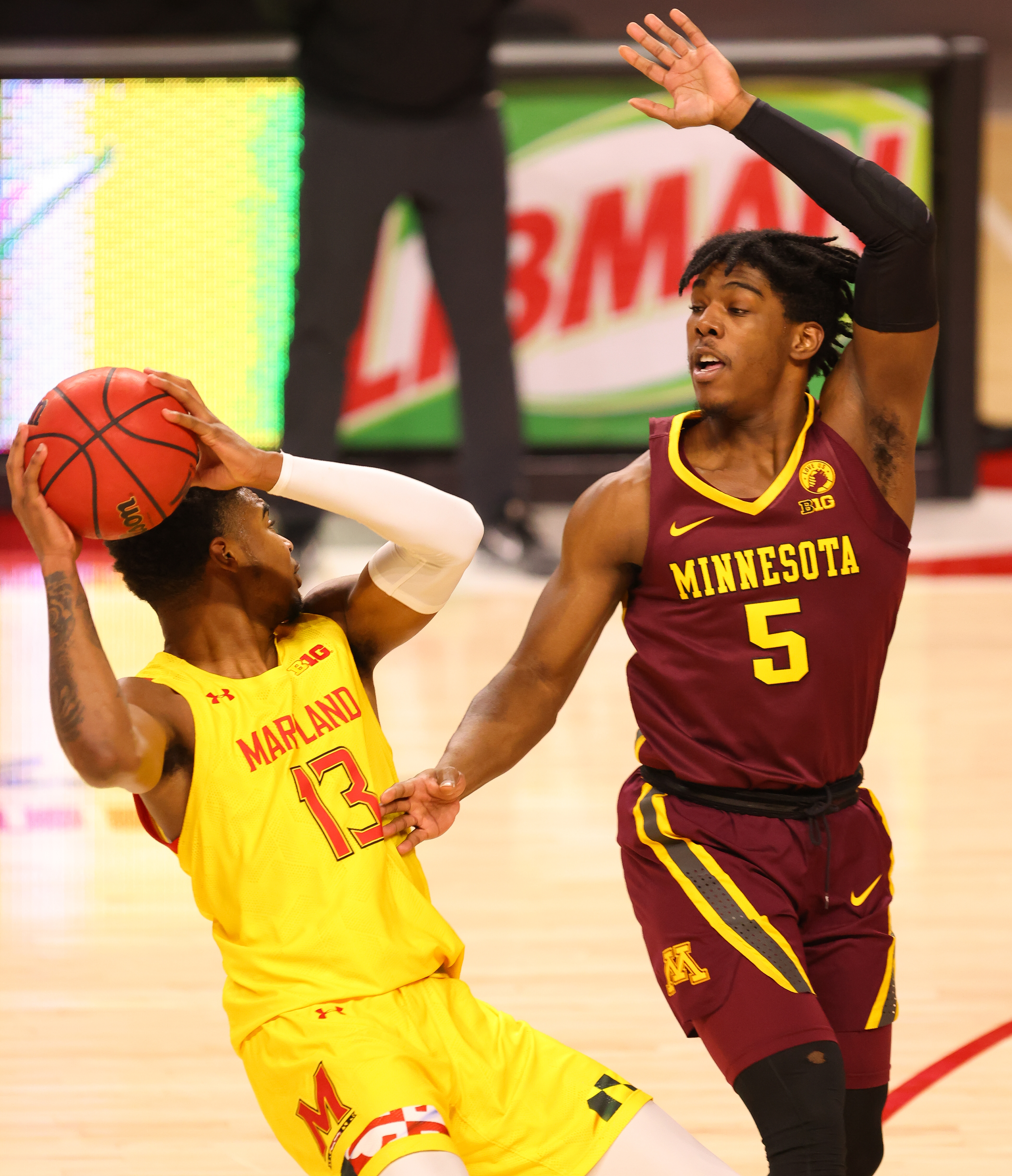
A Golden Gophers player (right) defending a Maryland player in 2021

=== The Ben Johnson era (2021–2025) ===
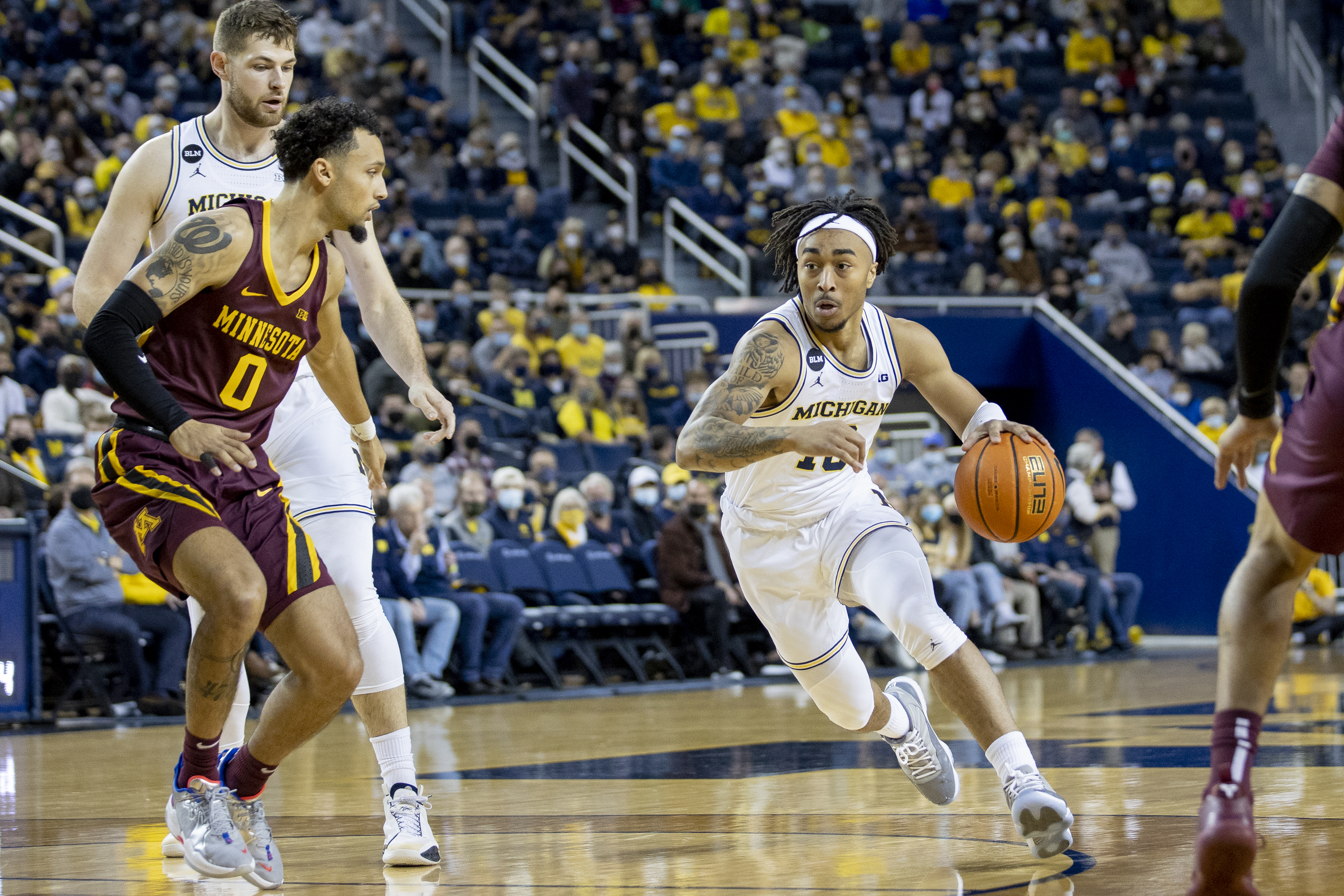
Payton Willis (left) in maroon Minnesota jersey, on defense in December 2021.

In March 2021, the University of Minnesota hired Ben Johnson head coach. A Minnesota native, former Gophers player and assistant coach, Johnson also was previously an assistant at Xavier and Nebraska. On March 13, 2025, Johnson was fired after four seasons without NCAA tournament appearances.

=== The Niko Medved era (2025–current) ===
On March 22, 2025, the University of Minnesota hired Niko Medved, a Roseville, Minnesota, high school graduate who went on the graduate from the U of M. A Minnesota kid, Medved had been assistant coach at Macalester, University of Minnesota, Furman, and Colorado State. He went on to become a head coach at Furman, Colorado State, and Drake.

=== Awards ===
Big Ten MVP

- Chuck Mencel – 1955
- Jim Brewer – 1972
- Mychal Thompson – 1978
- Bobby Jackson – 1997 (later revoked due to the academic fraud scandal)

Big Ten Coach of the Year

- Jim Dutcher – 1982
- Clem Haskins – 1997 (later revoked due to the academic fraud scandal)
- Richard Pitino – 2017

Henry Iba Award (National Coach of the Year)

- Clem Haskins – 1997

Big Ten Defensive Player of the Year

- Bobby Jackson – 1997 (later revoked due to the academic fraud scandal)
- Travarus Bennett – 2002
- Reggie Lynch – 2017

Big Ten Freshman of the Year

- Rick Rickert – 2002
- Kris Humphries – 2004

Consensus All-Americans

- Jim McIntyre – 1948
- Dick Garmaker – 1955
- Mychal Thompson – 1978

Academic All-American

- Blake Hoffarber – 2011 (2nd Team)

== Post-season ==
The Gophers enjoyed fairly regular post season appearances under former coach Clem Haskins, making the post season in 10 of his 13 seasons as coach (6 NCAA tournament, 4 NIT), including all of his last 8 seasons. The team advanced to one Final 4, one Elite 8, one Sweet 16, one second round appearance, and suffered two first round losses. However, after the academic fraud scandal in 1999, the last 6 years of post season records were wiped out. So officially, the Gophers made 2 NCAA Tournament and 2 NIT appearances in the 13 years Haskins was coach. They advanced to the Elite 8 in 1990, the Sweet 16 in 1989, and were NIT champions in 1993.

The Gophers saw some moderate success in the early 1980s, appearing in the 1980, 1981, and 1983 NITs and the 1982 NCAA tournament, where they advanced to the Sweet 16.

Multiple problems plagued the Gophers during the 1976–1977 season, Jim Dutcher's 2nd as head coach. Heading into the season the team knew they would not be eligible for the post season because of sanctions from the Bill Musselman era. Even so, this turned out to be one of the best teams in Gopher history, with the team finishing at 24–3. But if not being post-season eligible was not punishment enough, it was later found out that Mychal Thompson had sold two complimentary tickets to Gopher home games. When it was discovered, the profits were donated to University of Minnesota scholarship funds. The school and several prominent supporters, including Senator Wendell Anderson attempted to back Thompson and the team. Nevertheless, when the NCAA discovered Thompson's act, Minnesota's record for the season was forfeited and the accomplishments of that season are considered unofficial and not included in NCAA records.

=== NCAA tournament results ===
The Golden Gophers have appeared in the NCAA tournament 14 times. Their combined record is 15–13. However, their tournament appearances from 1972, 1994, 1995 & 1997 have been vacated making their official record 9–10.

Year	Seed	Round	Opponent	Result
1972*		Sweet Sixteen; Regional 3rd Place Game	Florida State; Marquette	L 56–70; W 77–72
1982	#2	Second Round; Sweet Sixteen	#10 Chattanooga #3 Louisville	W 62–61; L 61–67
1989	#11	First Round; Second Round; Sweet Sixteen	#6 Kansas State #14 Siena #2 Duke	W 86–75; W 80–67; L 70–87
1990	#6	First Round; Second Round; Sweet Sixteen; Elite Eight	#11 UTEP #14 Northern Iowa #2 Syracuse #4 Georgia Tech	W 64–61 ^{OT} W 81–78; W 82–75; L 91–93
1994*	#6	First Round; Second Round	#11 Southern Illinois #3 Louisville	W 74–60; L 55–60
1995*	#9	First Round	#8 Saint Louis	L 61–64 ^{OT}
1997*	#1	First Round; Second Round; Sweet Sixteen; Elite Eight; Final Four	#16 SW Texas State #9 Temple #4 Clemson #2 UCLA #1 Kentucky	W 78–46; W 76–57; W 90–84 ^{2OT} W 80–72; L 69–78
1999	#7	First Round	#10 Gonzaga	L 63–75
2005	#8	First Round	#9 Iowa State	L 53–64
2009	#10	First Round	#7 Texas	L 62–76
2010	#11	First Round	#6 Xavier	L 54–65
2013	#11	First Round; Second Round	#6 UCLA #3 Florida	W 83–63; L 64–78
2017	#5	First Round	#12 Middle Tennessee	L 72–81
2019	#10	First Round; Second Round	#7 Louisville #2 Michigan State	W 86–76; L 50–70

* Vacated by the NCAA

=== NIT results ===
The Golden Gophers have appeared in the National Invitation Tournament (NIT) 16 times. Their combined record is 34–14. They were NIT Champions in 1993, 1998 and 2014. However, their tournament appearances in 1996 and 1998 have been vacated, including their 1998 title, making their official record 28–13.

Year	Round	Opponent	Result
1973	First Round; Quarterfinals	Rutgers; Alabama	W 68–59; L 65–69
1980	First Round; Second Round; Quarterfinals; Semifinals; Final	Bowling Green; Ole Miss; Louisiana–Lafayette; Illinois; Virginia	W 64–50; W 58–56; W 94–73; W 65–63; L 55–58
1981	First Round; Second Round; Quarterfinals	Drake; Connecticut; West Virginia	W 90–77; W 84–66; L 69–80
1983	First Round	DePaul	L 73–76
1992	First Round	Washington State	L 70–72
1993	First Round; Second Round; Quarterfinals; Semifinals; Final	Florida; Oklahoma; USC; Providence; Georgetown	W 74–66; W 86–72; W 76–58; W 76–70; W 62–61
1996*	First Round; Second Round	Saint Louis; Tulane	W 68–52; L 65–84
1998*	First Round; Second Round; Quarterfinals; Semifinals; Final	Colorado State; UAB; Marquette; Fresno State; Penn State	W 77–65; W 79–66; W 73–71; W 91–89; W 79–72
2001	First Round; Second Round	Villanova; Tulsa	W 87–78; L 70–73
2002	First Round; Second Round	New Mexico; Richmond	W 96–62; L 66–67
2003	First Round; Second Round; Quarterfinals; Semifinals	Saint Louis; Hawaiʻi; Temple; Georgetown; Texas Tech	W 62–52; W 84–70; W 63–58; L 74–88; L 61–71
2006	First Round; Second Round	Wake Forest; Cincinnati	W 73–58; L 62–76
2008	First Round	Maryland	L 58–68
2012	First Round; Second Round; Quarterfinals; Semifinals; Final	La Salle; Miami (FL); Middle Tennessee; Washington; Stanford	W 70–61; W 78–60; W 78–72; W 68–67 ^{OT} L 51–75
2014	First Round; Second Round; Quarterfinals; Semifinals; Final	High Point; Saint Mary's; Southern Miss; Florida State; SMU	W 88–81; W 63–55; W 81–73; W 67–64 ^{OT} W 65–63
2024	First Round; Second Round	Butler; Indiana State	W 73-72; L 64-76

* Vacated by the NCAA

=== CBC results ===
The Golden Gophers have appeared in one College Basketball Crown (CBC). Their record is 0–1.

Year	Round	Opponent	Result
2026	Quarterfinals	Baylor	L 48–67

== Facilities ==
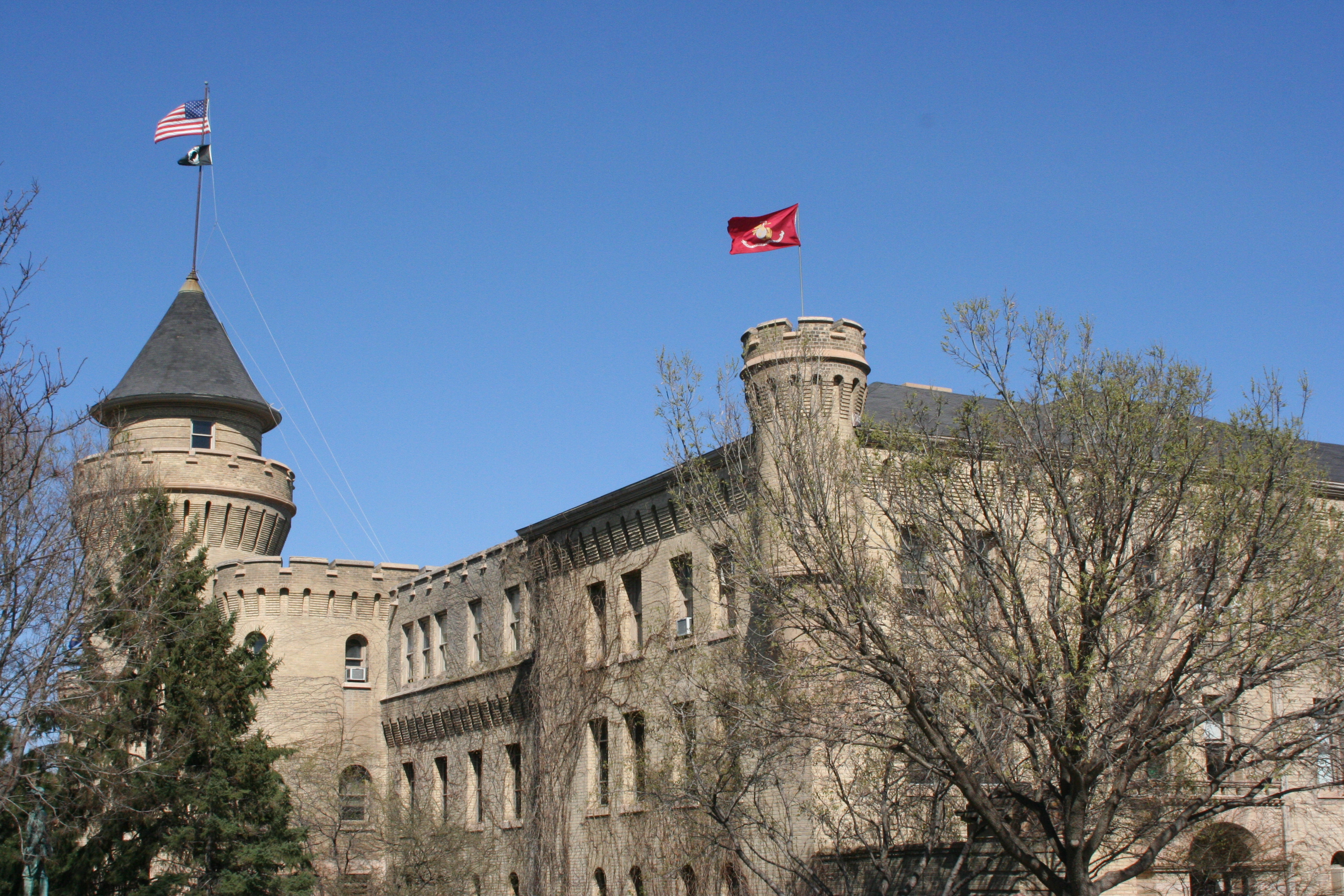
University of Minnesota Armory, home of the Gophers from 1896 to 1925, as it looks today.

When the Gophers first organized, they played games in the on campus YMCA. In 1896, the team moved into the campus Armory, a large building with gymnasium space for the team to use, even if basketball was not its primary purpose. They remained in the Armory for almost 30 years. Halfway through the 1924–25 season, coach Harold Taylor moved the team from the University Armory to the Kenwood Armory in downtown Minneapolis. This significantly increased the attendance; capacity at the University Armory was 2,000, and it was 6,500 at Kenwood. The team only played at Kenwood for a few seasons, however, as the University of Minnesota Field House — later known as Williams Arena — opened partway through the 1927–1928 season. The team moved in on January 31, 1928.

The Field House increased attendance capacity further, to 9,500. It was named after Henry L. Williams, the former Minnesota Golden Gophers football coach in 1950, and was named after him when it was remodeled and expanded in 1950, bringing the arena to a capacity of 18,025, which was the largest in the country for 20 years and significantly larger than the capacity of Williams Arena today. Gophers fans refer to Williams Arena as the Barn. Consequently, the student section is known as The Barnyard. Williams Arena was remodeled in 1993 again, to create a new facility for the women's team to use. The team continues to play there to this day, making it one of the longest used arenas of any college basketball team and the oldest arena in the Big ten. Williams Arena is also one of the few remaining arenas with a raised court, in which players have to go up stairs to reach the playing surface.

== Rivals ==
In the early years of the program, the Gophers had several rivalries that have not extended into the modern era. Among them was a rivalry with Hamline University, now a Division III school in St. Paul. Hamline had one of the earliest college basketball programs in the country and it was several years before Minnesota competed on equal footing with them; they played as late as 1935. The greatest rival of the early years of the program was the Minnesota Aggies, representing the Minnesota School of Agriculture and Mining, which has since been incorporated into the University of Minnesota Twin Cities as the St. Paul campus. Minnesota A&M dominated the Gophers, winning ten consecutive games; Minnesota did not get its first win against the Aggies until 1899. This rivalry expired especially early, and the two teams did not meet after 1901.

The Gophers were also an active participant in the early rivalry between Eastern schools and Midwestern schools for basketball preeminence. Minnesota broke up a stretch of Ivy League dominance from 1901 to 1906 with their successful 1902 season. The Eastern teams – Yale, Columbia, and Dartmouth were early powers – played with a more physical approach, while Midwestern teams used a different method. Wisconsin coach Walter Meanwell used the motion offense and "stress[ed] finesse." W.C. Hyatt, who played for Yale, claimed that "The Minnesota and Wisconsin men played in the style prevalent among most of the girl colleges in the East, that is, the 'no contact' game."

In the modern era of the program, as is the case with most Big Ten sports, Minnesota's primary rivals are the Iowa Hawkeyes and Wisconsin Badgers. In recent years, the rivalry with Wisconsin has become more intense than that with Iowa, primarily due to Wisconsin's rise to basketball powerhouse on the court. Minnesota and Wisconsin's games together count towards the Border Battle, an annual trophy given to the points winner of several sports played between the two schools throughout the year.

The Gophers also have a lesser rivalry with Ohio State. The two teams have very little history together, outside of a 1972 brawl between the teams at Williams Arena.
