= George Hanson =

American basketball coach

George Hanson (April 12, 1935 – September 22, 2016) was an American basketball coach. Hanson was the head coach of the Minnesota Golden Gophers for the 1970–71 season, where he finished 11–13 and led the squad to a 5th-place finish. Hanson resigned after one season and was replaced by Bill Musselman. Hanson played for the Gophers in the 1950s and was subsequently an assistant coach with John Kundla and Bill Fitch. He succeeded Fitch as Gophers coach in 1970.

He died on September 22, 2016, at the age of 81.
