= Harry Taylor (engineer) =

United States Army officer

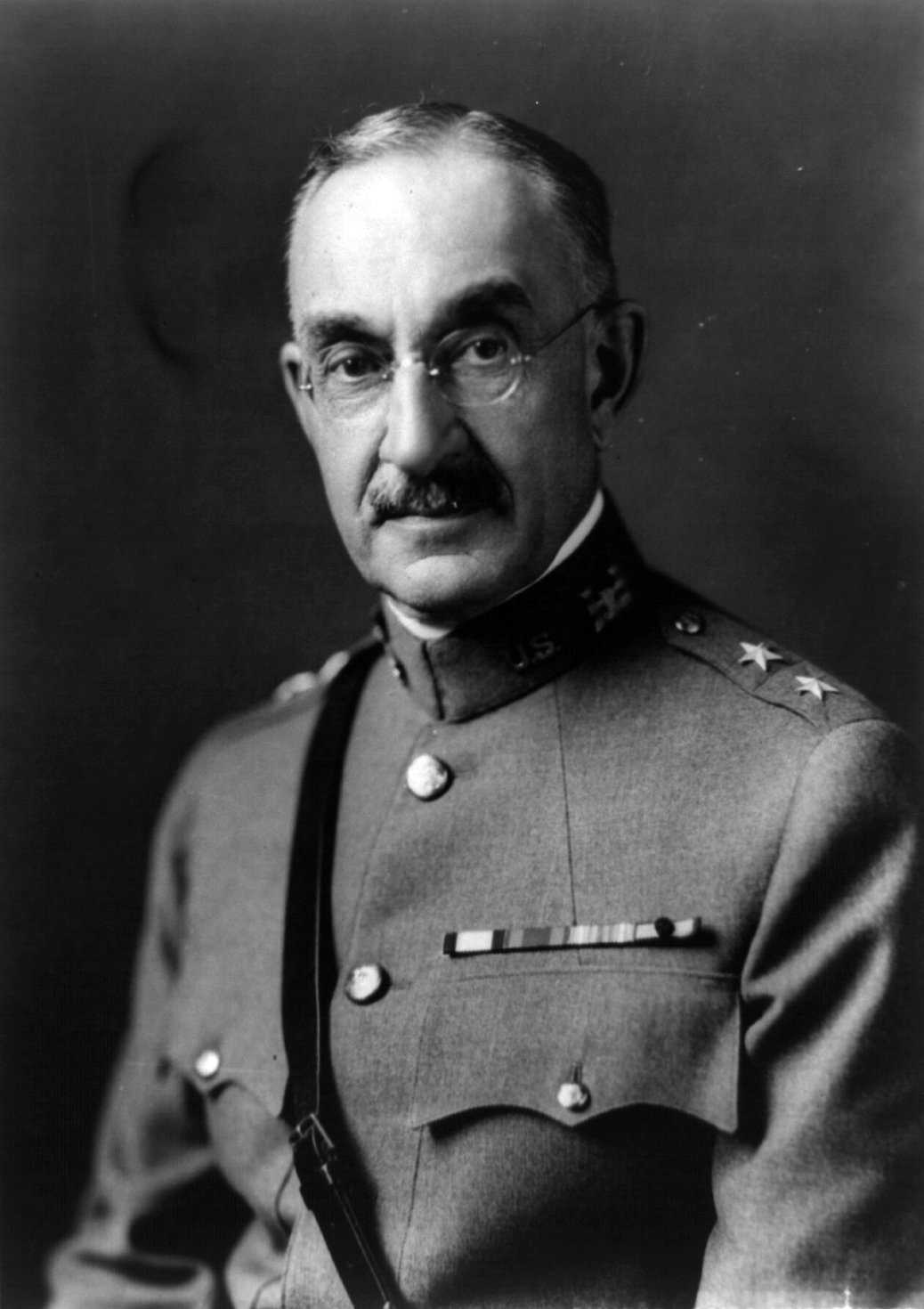
- Major General Harry Taylor, Chief of Engineers 1924–1926
- Born: June 26, 1862; Tilton, New Hampshire
- Died: January 27, 1930 (aged 67); Washington, D.C.
- Burial place: Arlington National Cemetery, Virginia
- Military career
- Allegiance: United States of America
- Branch: United States Army
- Service years: 1884–1926
- Rank: Major General
- Commands: Chief Engineer, American Expeditionary Force; Chief of Engineers
- Wars: World War I: Western Front
- Awards: Distinguished Service Medal; Legion of Honor

Harry Taylor (June 26, 1862 – January 27, 1930) was a U.S. Army officer who fought in World War I, and who served for a time as Chief of Engineers.

== Early life ==
Taylor was born in Tilton, New Hampshire, and graduated from the United States Military Academy in 1884 and commissioned in the Corps of Engineers.

== Military career ==
After serving in engineer offices in Wilmington, North Carolina, and New York City, Taylor served from 1891 to 1900 on fortifications and rivers and harbors construction work in Oregon and Washington. Later he pursued similar work in New England and New York. Transferred to the Philippines, he supervised all fortification work there in 1904–05. Taylor was district engineer in New London, Connecticut, from 1906 to 1911. He then headed the River and Harbor Division in the Office of the Chief of Engineers for five years.

During World War I he served as chief engineer, American Expeditionary Forces in France (mid-1917 to mid-1918). In this capacity he supervised the construction of railways, barracks, wharves, and shelters throughout France. Taylor was awarded the Distinguished Service Medal and the French Légion d'honneur (Legion of Honor).

After serving as assistant chief of engineers six years, he was named major general, Chief of Engineers, on June 19, 1924. Wilson Dam was completed during his tenure. General Taylor retired June 26, 1926. He died from pneumonia on January 27, 1930, in Washington, D.C., and was buried in Arlington National Cemetery.

In 1943, the navy transport ship USS General Harry Taylor (AP-145) was named in his honor.

Military offices
Preceded by Lansing Hoskins Beach	Chief of Engineers; 1924–1926	Succeeded by Edgar Jadwin
