= Harry Taylor (footballer, born 1881) =

Scottish footballer

Personal information
- Full name: Henry Taylor
- Date of birth: 1881
- Place of birth: Falkirk, Scotland
- Date of death: 27 May 1917 (aged 35–36)
- Place of death: near Rœux, France
- Position: Right half

Senior career*
Years	Team	Apps	(Gls)
–1903	Cowie Wanderers		
1903–1910	Dundee	0	(0)
1910–1911	King's Park		
1911	Dundee Hibernian	3	(0)
1911–1912	Falkirk	2	(0)
1912–1913	Stenhousemuir		
- * Club domestic league appearances and goals

Henry Taylor (1881 – 27 May 1917) was a Scottish professional footballer who played as a right half in the Scottish League for Dundee Hibernian and Falkirk.

== Personal life ==
Taylor worked as a brakesman for the Callandar Coal Company. He served as a private in the Gordon Highlanders during the First World War and was killed near Rœux on 27 May 1917. He was buried in Brown's Copse Cemetery, Rœux.

== Career statistics ==
Appearances and goals by club, season and competition
Club	Season	League			Scottish Cup		Other		Total	
Club	Season	Division	Apps	Goals	Apps	Goals	Apps	Goals	Apps	Goals
Dundee Hibernian	1911–12	Scottish Second Division	3	0	—		1 (Note: Appearance in Scottish Qualifying Cup)	0	4	0
Falkirk	1911–12	Scottish First Division	2	0	0	0	—		2	0
Career total			5	0	0	0	1	0	6	0
