= Harold Taylor (basketball coach) =

American basketball coach

Minnesota Golden Gophers
- Position: Head coach
- Coaching career: 1924–1927

Harold Taylor was an American basketball coach. He succeeded L. J. Cooke as the second coach of the Minnesota Golden Gophers men's basketball team. Taylor was the Gophers head coach for three seasons, from 1924 to 1927, and finished with a 19–30 career record. Taylor served as Cooke's assistant for the 1923–24 season before his promotion. Prior to becoming Cooke's assistant, Taylor was the coach at Aurora High School, where he won the 1923 state basketball tournament.
