= Henry Taylor (cricketer, born 1822) =

English cricketer (1822 – 1901)

Personal information
- Full name: Henry Cavendish Taylor
- Born: 5 January 1822; Claverley, Shropshire, England
- Died: 31 October 1901 (aged 79); Claverley, Shropshire, England
- Batting: Unknown

Domestic team information
- Years: Team
- 1843: Sussex

Career statistics
Competition	First-class
Matches	1
Runs scored	7
Batting average	3.50
100s/50s	–/–
Top score	7
Balls bowled	–
Wickets	–
Bowling average	–
5 wickets in innings	–
10 wickets in match	–
Best bowling	–
Catches/stumpings	–/–
- Source: Cricinfo, 8 January 2012

Henry Cavendish Taylor (5 January 1822 – 31 October 1901) was an English cricketer. Taylor's batting style is unknown. He was born at Chyknell Hall in Claverley, Shropshire, and later changed his fullname to Henry Cavendish, losing his surname Taylor.

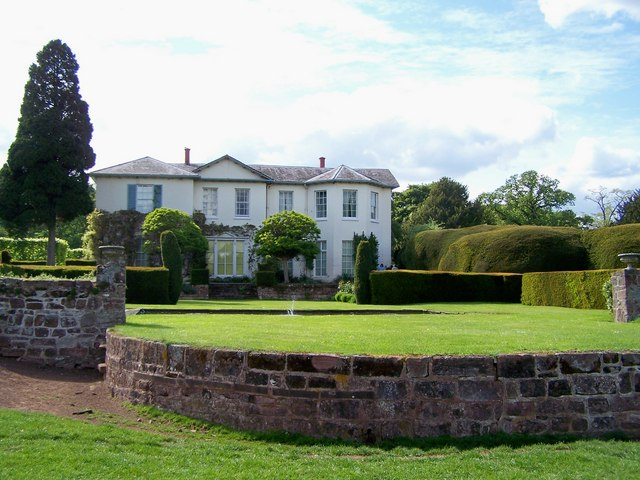
Taylor was born at Chyknell Hall in 1822

Taylor made a single first-class appearance for Sussex against Nottinghamshire at Trent Bridge in 1843. Nottinghamshire made 326 runs in their first-innings, with Sussex making just 33 in response, with Taylor being dismissed for 7 by William Clarke. Following-on in their second-innings, Sussex substantially improved in making 262 all out, with Taylor, who opened the batting in this innings, being dismissed for a duck by Sam Redgate. Despite their improved showing, Sussex still lost the match by an innings and 31 runs.

He was appointed a deputy lieutenant of the County of Salop on 10 March 1846. He married Selina Elizabeth Gage on 22 July 1862, with their marriage lasting until their divorce in 1872. The couple had three children. He died at Chyknell Hall on 31 October 1901.
