= Henry Taylor (cricketer, born 1949) =

English cricketer

Personal information
- Full name: Henry John Corbett Taylor
- Born: 16 April 1949 (age 77); Solihull, Warwickshire, England
- Batting: Right-handed
- Bowling: Right-arm off break

Domestic team information
- Years: Team
- 1968–1969: Cambridge University

Career statistics
Competition	First-class
Matches	13
Runs scored	246
Batting average	10.25
100s/50s	–/1
Top score	50
Balls bowled	18
Wickets	0
Bowling average	–
5 wickets in innings	–
10 wickets in match	–
Best bowling	–
Catches/stumpings	4/–
- Source: Cricinfo, 13 January 2022

Henry John Corbett Taylor (born 16 April 1949) is an English former first-class cricketer.

Taylor was born at Solihull in April 1965 and was educated there at Solihull School, before going up to Jesus College, Cambridge. While studying at Cambridge, he played first-class cricket for Cambridge University Cricket Club in 1968 and 1969, making 13 appearances. He scored 246 runs in his 13 matches, at an average of 10.25. His one half century, a score of exactly 50, came against Leicestershire in 1968, as part of a stand of 80 for the eighth wicket with Anthony Palfreman.
