= Henry Taylor (cricketer, born 1856) =

English cricketer

Henry Storm Taylor (11 December 1856 – 16 November 1896) was an English first-class cricketer, who played three matches for Yorkshire County Cricket Club in 1879.

Born in Scarborough, Yorkshire, England, Taylor was a right-handed batsman, who scored 36 runs at 7.20, with a best of 22 against Surrey. His right arm medium bowling was not called upon.

Taylor died in November 1896 in Great Lever, Bolton, Lancashire, aged 39.
