= L. J. Cooke =

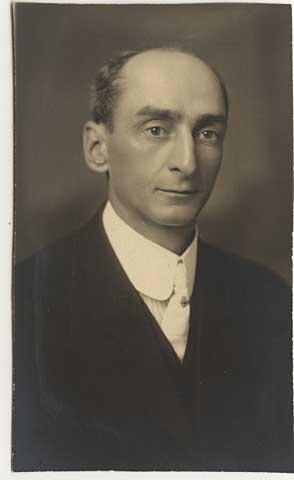

Biographical details
- Born: February 15, 1868; Toledo, Ohio, U.S.
- Died: August 19, 1943 (aged 75); Minneapolis, Minnesota, U.S.

Coaching career (HC unless noted)
- 1896–1924: Minnesota

Head coaching record
- Overall: 250–135–2

Accomplishments and honors

Championships
- 2 Helms national championships (1902, 1919); 5 Western / Big Ten regular season (1906, 1907, 1911, 1917, 1919)

Louis Joseph "Doc" Cooke (February 15, 1868 – August 19, 1943) was an American basketball coach. He was the first head men's basketball coach at the University of Minnesota. He coached the Minnesota Golden Gophers men’s basketball team for 28 seasons. Cooke also served as the university’s athletic director for a time and is responsible for the creation of Little Brown Jug tradition between Minnesota and the Michigan Wolverines, the longest existing traveling trophy tradition in college football.

Cooke came to Minnesota in 1895 to be the director of physical education for the YMCA in Minneapolis after completing his M.D. at the University of Vermont. His degree from Vermont led to his nickname of "Doc". He began to work with the University of Minnesota’s basketball program on a part-time basis in the 1896–97 season. In February 1897, the university agreed to pay part of Cooke’s salary, and he was employed by the school full-time by the fall of 1897. This made him one of the earliest professional coaches.

Cooke spent a couple of seasons building the program playing smaller schools in the Twin Cities and YMCA teams. By 1900, the university was largely playing other public universities in neighboring states. His 1901-1902 Gopher team was retroactively named a national champion by the Helms Foundation. In addition, the 1901-1902 and 1902-1903 teams were retroactively listed as the top teams for their respective seasons by the Premo-Porretta Power Poll. When the Big Ten began basketball play in 1905, the Gophers were an early power, winning the first two regular season titles. They also won a disputed conference title in 1910–11 under Cooke; the Gophers and Big Ten official records list the Gophers’ conference record as 8–4, good enough for a tie for first place. Other sources, however, indicate that the Gophers’ record was only 7–4. The Big Ten indicates the Gophers as co-champion for the 1910–11 campaign, though, so they do officially hold the title.

After several down seasons, L. J. Cooke again brought the Gophers to prominence near the end of his career. He led the team to the 1916–17 conference title. In 1918–19, he went on to have his greatest success as a coach. The Gophers went undefeated, were retroactively named a national champion by Helms, and were retroactively listed as the top team of the season by Premo-Porretta. Even more impressive, though, was the dominance shown by the Gophers in their wins. Eleven of their 13 wins were by ten points or more, in a low scoring era in which the Gophers averaged only 35.5 points per game and many teams hovered around 20 points per game. Cooke before the 1924–25 season opened after having coached at the program for 28 seasons. Cooke’s involvement in the development of basketball was significant. He helped significantly increase the prominence of basketball in the state of Minnesota. His role in making the University of Minnesota into the dominant basketball program in Minnesota was equally important. Cooke was one of the original members of the national rules committee on basketball and played a role in the evolution of the sport on a national stage.

In addition to his tenure as basketball coach, Cooke was a long-time athletic director and assistant athletic director at Minnesota. It was in this capacity that he came into possession of the Little Brown Jug, after Michigan left it behind following a road game against the Gophers football team. Cooke famously refused to return the trophy to the Wolverines, and the battle for the Little Brown Jug was born. Cooke stayed in this capacity – and Professor of Physical Education – after retiring as Gophers basketball coach. He retired from all involvement at the university in 1936. The Athletics Administration hall was named Cooke Hall in 1938. Cooke died on August 19, 1943, at his home on 6th Street in Minneapolis. He was buried in Lakewood Cemetery.

Cooke’s career record is disputed, as completely accurate records from the early years of basketball do not exist. The Gophers Media Guide puts Cooke’s record at 250–135–2, with a .649 winning percentage. Mark Hugunin and Stew Thornley’s research disputes several seasons’ results based on box scores and newspaper clippings, and they put Cooke’s career record at 254–142–3, with a .640 winning percentage. In Gopher Glory, Steve Perlstein lists Cooke’s career record at 245–137–2 (.641), even though this book is published with some corroboration of the university itself. Accepting any records of these as correct, however, shows the great success that Cooke had at the program, and he is by far the winningest coach in Gophers basketball history.
