= Lal Taylor =

English footballer

Personal information
- Full name: Harold William Taylor
- Date of birth: 20 December 1910
- Place of birth: Boston, England
- Date of death: 15 November 1970 (aged 59)
- Place of death: Southport, England
- Positions: Right half; inside right

Senior career*
Years	Team	Apps	(Gls)
–1929	Vulcans		
1929–1933	Southport	1	(0)
1933–1940	Clapton Orient	174	(13)
1940–1941	Southport		
- * Club domestic league appearances and goals

Harold William Taylor (20 December 1910 – 15 November 1970) was an English professional footballer who made over 170 appearances in the Football League for Clapton Orient as a right half.

== Career statistics ==
Appearances and goals by club, season and competition
Club	Season	League			FA Cup		Other		Total	
Club	Season	Division	Apps	Goals	Apps	Goals	Apps	Goals	Apps	Goals
Southport	1931–32	Third Division North	1	0	0	0	1 (Note: Appearance in Lancashire Senior Cup)	0	2	0
Career total			1	0	0	0	1	0	2	0
