= USNS General Hoyt S. Vandenberg =

US Navy transport ship sunk as artificial reef at Key West

Coordinates: 24°27′N 81°44′W

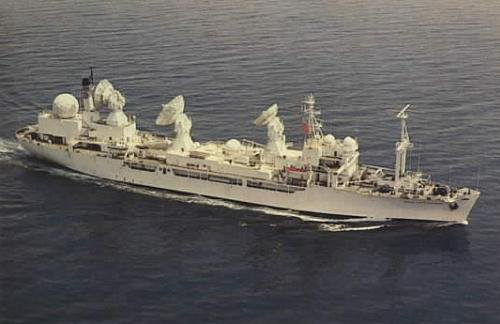
- USNS General Hoyt S. Vandenberg (T-AGM-10) underway after conversion into a missile range instrumentation ship. She was originally USS General Harry Taylor (AP-145)

History

United States
- Name: General Harry Taylor (1943-1963); General Hoyt S. Vandenberg (1963-
- Namesake: Harry Taylor; Hoyt Vandenberg
- Builder: Kaiser Co., Inc.; Richmond, California
- Laid down: 22 February 1943
- Launched: 10 October 1943
- Sponsored by: Mrs. Mamie M. McHugh
- Christened: 2 October 1943
- Acquired: 29 March 1944
- Commissioned: 1 April 1944 (ferry)
- Decommissioned: 10 April 1944 (ferry)
- Identification: Code letters and radio callsign NJHB; IMO number: 8450653
- Commissioned: 8 May 1944
- Decommissioned: 13 June 1946
- Stricken: 3 July 1946
- Fate: To U.S. Army Transport Service
- Renamed: USAT General Harry Taylor
- Operator: U.S. Army Transport Service
- In service: after 3 July 1946
- Out of service: 1 March 1950
- Fate: To MSTS
- Renamed: USNS General Harry Taylor
- Reclassified: T-AP-145, 1 March 1950
- Operator: MSTS
- In service: 1 March 1950
- Out of service: 19 September 1958
- Stricken: 10 July 1958
- Fate: To U.S. Air Force
- Operator: U.S. Air Force
- Acquired: 15 July 1961
- Renamed: USAFS General Hoyt S. Vandenberg
- Namesake: Hoyt S. Vandenberg
- In service: 1 June 1963
- Out of service: 1 July 1964
- Identification: Code letters and radio callsign NBBP
- Fate: To MSTS
- Renamed: USNS General Hoyt S. Vandenberg
- Reclassified: T-AGM-10, 1 July 1964
- In service: 1 July 1964
- Out of service: 1983
- Stricken: 29 April 1993
- Fate: NDRF James River, Movie Virus, NDRF
- In service: 2007
- Out of service: 2008
- Fate: Sunk as an artificial reef 27 May 2009

General characteristics
- Class & type: General G. O. Squier-class transport ship
- Displacement: 9,950 tons (light), 17,250 tons (full)
- Length: 522 ft 10 in (159.36 m)
- Beam: 71 ft 6 in (21.79 m)
- Draft: 24 ft (7.32 m)
- Propulsion: single-screw steam turbine with 9,900 shp (7,400 kW)
- Speed: 17 knots (31 km/h)
- Capacity: 3,224 troops
- Complement: 356 (officers and enlisted)
- Armament: As built: 4 × 5"/38 caliber guns; 8 × 1.1"/75 AA guns; 16 × 20 mm Oerlikon AA guns

USNS General Hoyt S. Vandenberg (T-AGM-10) (originally named USS General Harry Taylor (AP-145)) was a General G. O. Squier-class transport ship in the United States Navy in World War II named in honor of U.S. Army Chief of Engineers Harry Taylor. She served for a time as army transport USAT General Harry Taylor, and was reacquired by the navy in 1950 as USNS General Harry Taylor (T-AP-145).

Placed in reserve in 1958, she was transferred to the U.S. Air Force in 1961 and renamed USAFS General Hoyt S. Vandenberg in 1963 in honor of the former Air Force Chief of Staff. She was reacquired by the U.S. Navy in 1964 as USNS General Hoyt S. Vandenberg (T-AGM-10).

Retired in 1983, and struck from the Naval Vessel Register in 1993, she was to be sunk as an artificial reef originally intended for the spring of 2008, but instead was placed under Federal Lien to be auctioned off for payment recovery in December 2008 at Norfolk Federal Court. A group of banks and financiers from Key West bought the vessel off the auction block and it was docked at the East Quay Pier of Key West Harbor. The ship was sunk 27 May 2009 and is the second-largest artificial reef in the world, after the aircraft carrier USS Oriskany.

== Operational history ==
=== Transport ship ===
The unnamed C4-S-A1-design transport was laid down under a United States Maritime Commission contract (MC Hull No. 702) on 22 February 1943 at Richmond, California, by Kaiser Co., Inc., Yard 3; named General Harry Taylor (AP-145) on 2 October 1943; launched on 10 October 1943; sponsored by Mrs. Mamie M. McHugh; acquired by the Navy on 29 March 1944; placed in ferry commission on 1 April 1944 for transfer to Portland, Oregon, for conversion to a transport by Kaiser Co., Inc., Vancouver, Washington; decommissioned on 10 April 1944; and commissioned on 8 May 1944 at Portland.

Following shakedown off San Diego, General Harry Taylor sailed from San Francisco on 23 June 1944 with troop reinforcements for Milne Bay, New Guinea. After returning to San Francisco on 3 August with veterans of the Guadalcanal campaign embarked, she continued transport voyages between San Francisco and island bases in the western Pacific. During the next 10 months, she steamed to New Guinea, the Solomons, New Caledonia, the Marianas, the New Hebrides, the Palaus, and the Philippines, carrying troops and supplies, until 29 June 1945 when she departed San Francisco for duty in the Atlantic.

With the European war over, General Harry Taylor made two "Magic Carpet" voyages to Marseille and back, carrying returning veterans of the fighting in that theater. Next she sailed twice to Karachi, India, via the Suez Canal. Returning to New York on 3 January 1946, the transport then began the first of four voyages to Bremerhaven, Germany, and Le Havre, France. She reached New York again on 21 May 1946 and decommissioned on 13 June at Baltimore. She was stricken from the Navy Register on 3 July 1946.

General Harry Taylor served for a time with the U.S. Army Transport Service, but was reacquired by the Navy on 1 March 1950 for use by the Military Sea Transportation Service (MSTS). She was reinstated on the Navy List on 28 April 1950. Her early duties consisted mainly of carrying troops, dependents, and large numbers of European refugees. USNS General Harry Taylor (T-AP-145) operated in a typical year to the Caribbean, Mediterranean, and in northern European waters. In 1957, she took part in the Hungarian Relief program, transporting several thousand refugees of the short-lived Hungarian Revolution to Australia. She was placed in ready reserve on 19 September 1957; stricken from the Naval Register on 10 July 1958 and transferred back to the Maritime Administration the same day. She was placed in the National Defense Reserve Fleet at Beaumont, Texas.

=== Missile range instrumentation ship ===
General Harry Taylor was then transferred to the U.S. Air Force, on 15 July 1961, and was renamed USAFS General Hoyt S. Vandenberg on 11 June 1963.

On 1 July 1964, General Hoyt S. Vandenberg was acquired by the Navy and designated T-AGM-10, as a missile range instrumentation ship, one of ten such ships transferred from the Commander, Air Force Eastern Test Range, to MSTS. In 1974 the ship, commanded by Captain Anderson, deployed to Dakar, Senegal, to participate in the Global Atmospheric Research Program. "Equipped with extremely accurate and discriminating radar and telemetry equipment," she tracked and analyzed "re-entry bodies in the terminal phase of ballistic missile test flights," carrying out those missile and spacecraft tracking duties in both Atlantic and Pacific waters until her retirement in 1983. She was ultimately stricken from the Naval Vessel Register on 29 April 1993.

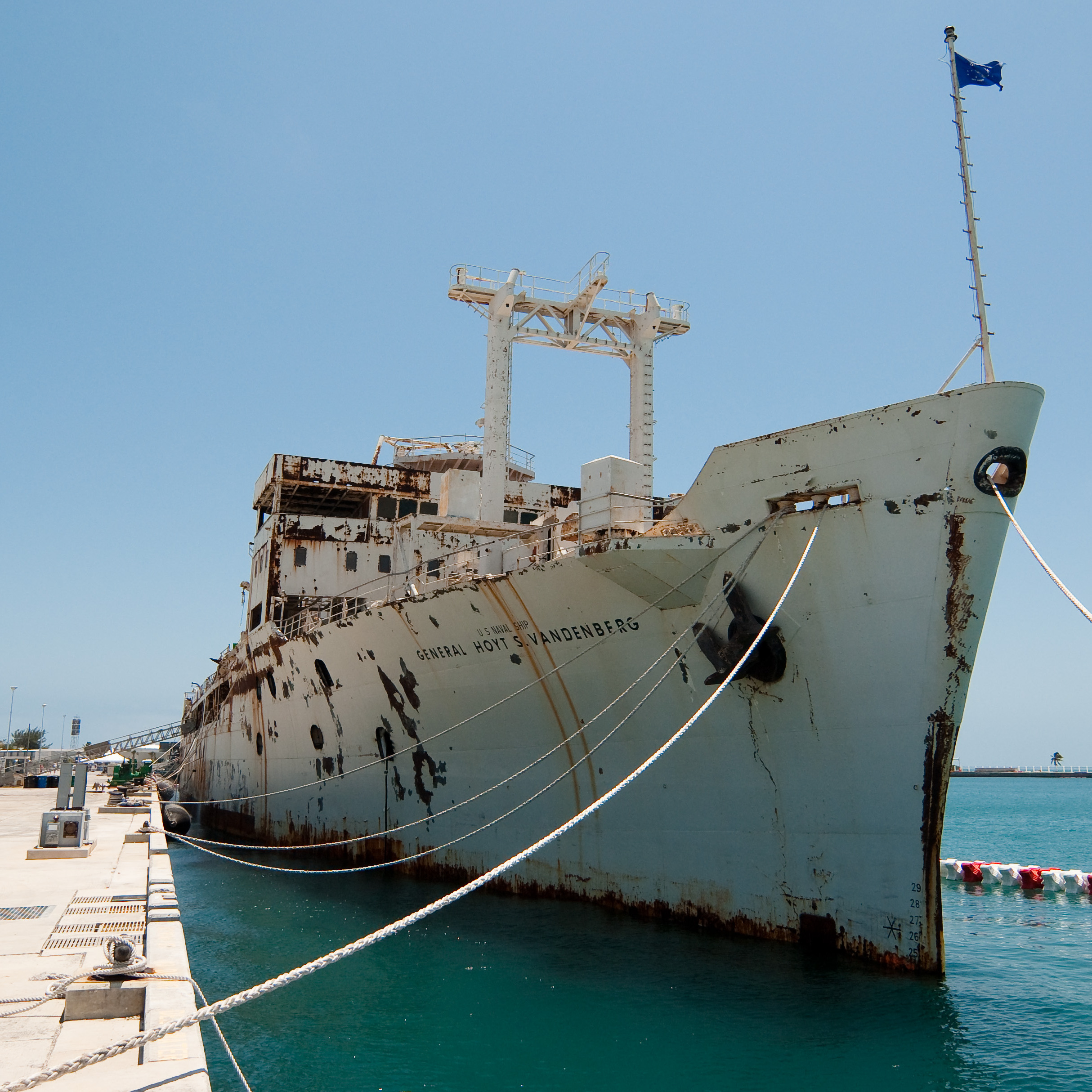
General Hoyt S. Vandenberg at Key West docks in May 2009

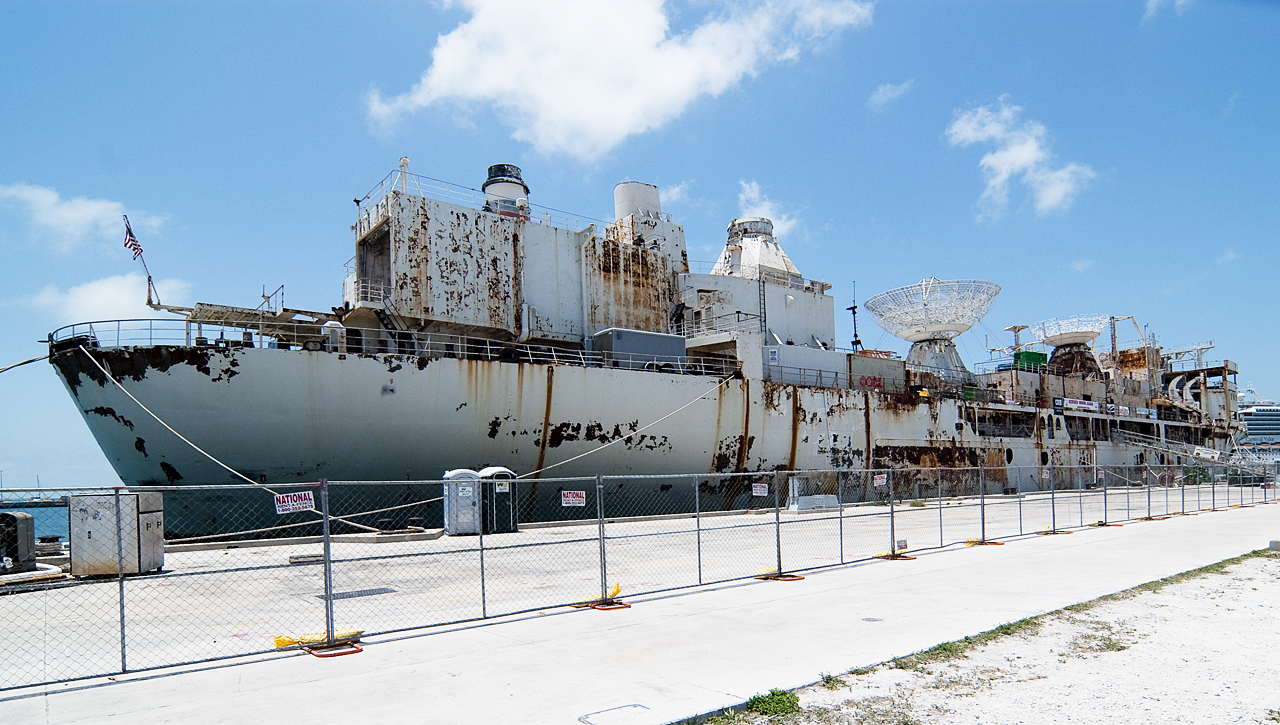
General Hoyt S. Vandenberg at Key West docks in May 2009

In 1998, some scenes of the horror/sci-fi film Virus were filmed aboard the ex-General Hoyt S. Vandenberg. The ship substituted for a fictional Russian vessel called the Akademik Vladislav Volkov, and some of the Cyrillic lettering applied for the film is still visible on the hull today.

The ship was transferred to the Maritime Administration on 1 May 1999. Her projected transfer to the state of Florida, for use as an artificial reef, received approval on 13 February 2007. The ship was sunk 6 miles (10 km) off the Florida Keys in the Florida Keys National Marine Sanctuary. The sinking was originally set to take place on 15 May 2008 but was postponed because the ship was placed under "Federal Arrest" by a US Federal Court for failure to pay shipyard fees related to the clean-up and preparation for the sinking. She was later ordered to be sold at auction to pay the shipyard fees. A group of banks and financiers from Key West was able to arrange to pay the fees and title of the ship was transferred to the city of Key West.

On 12 April 2009, the Vandenberg left the shipyard in Norfolk, VA and began the long tow to Key West. On 22 April 2009 she arrived in the Key West Harbor where she was moored at the East Quay Pier. The sinking took place on Wednesday, 27 May 2009.

=== Artificial Reef ===
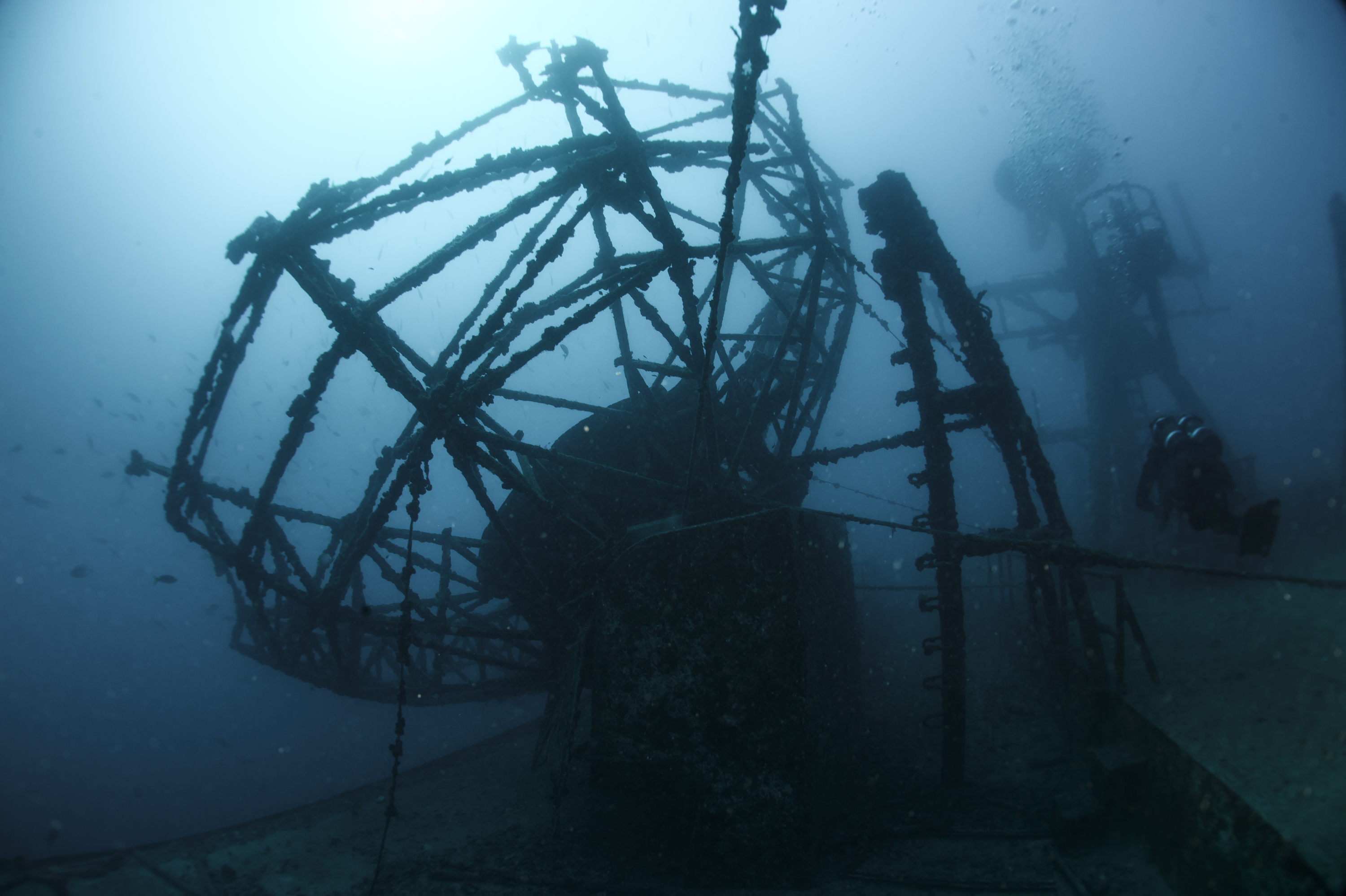
USNS Vandenberg in 2015.

The Vandenberg was deployed by Key West–based economic development company Reefmakers. Beginning in 1996, Reefmakers set out to create an artificial reef that benefited the local economy and ecosystem of whichever city it was set to be deployed in. From the pre- to post- USNS Vandenberg deployment period, there was a 40.1% increase in the total number of users (scuba divers, snorkelers, and others) on the surrounding natural reefs. A 23.5% increase in recreational scuba diving use occurred on the natural reefs representing 5,214 dives, which is in contrast to a 442% increase (34,394 dives) in the share of recreational scuba diving that occurred on artificial reefs. However, the share of total use on natural reefs did decline from 67% in the pre-deployment period to 46.5% in the post-deployment period. However, the increase in total demand effect dominated the substitution effect of switching from natural to artificial reefs resulting in an increase in total use on the surrounding natural reefs. Thus, the hypothesis that introduction of the USNS Vandenberg as an artificial reef would reduce use (pressure) on the surrounding natural reefs is not supported in a study made by the National Oceanic and Atmospheric Administration.

== Awards ==
- Asiatic–Pacific Campaign Medal
- European-African-Middle Eastern Campaign Medal
- World War II Victory Medal
- Navy Occupation Medal
- National Defense Service Medal with star

== See also ==
- Tracking ship, also known as Missile Range Instrumentation Ship – Class of ships used for tracking missiles and satellites
