= Harold Taylor (cricketer) =

English cricketer (1909–1990)

Personal information
- Full name: Harold William Frank Taylor
- Born: 27 December 1909; Chesterton, Cambridgeshire, England
- Died: 26 August 1990 (aged 80); Cambridge, Cambridgeshire, England
- Batting: Right-handed

Domestic team information
- Years: Team
- 1939: Minor Counties
- 1925–1956: Cambridgeshire

Career statistics
Competition	FC
Matches	2
Runs scored	58
Batting average	29.00
100s/50s	–/–
Top score	38
Balls bowled	–
Wickets	–
Bowling average	–
5 wickets in innings	–
10 wickets in match	–
Best bowling	–
Catches/stumpings	2/–
- Source: Cricinfo, 20 July 2010

Harold William Frank Taylor (27 December 1909 – 26 August 1990) was an English cricketer. Taylor was a right-handed batsman. He was born at Chesterton, Cambridgeshire.

Taylor played most of his cricket for Cambridgeshire in the Minor Counties Championship, where he made his debut for the county against the Surrey Second XI in 1925. From 1925 to 1956, he represented the county in 76 matches, with his final appearance coming against Hertfordshire.

Taylor also played first-class cricket, where he represented a combined Minor Counties team in 2 first-class matches against Oxford University and the touring Indians, both in 1939. In his 2 first-class matches, he scored 58 runs at a batting average of 29.00, with a high score of 38.

Taylor died at Cambridge, Cambridgeshire on 26 August 1990.
