= Henry Wyllys Taylor =

American politician

Henry Wyllys Taylor (February 2, 1796 – December 17, 1888) was an American lawyer, politician, and jurist.

Taylor, third son of the Rev. John Taylor and Elizabeth (Terry) Taylor, was born in Deerfield, Mass., where his father was then pastor, on February 2, 1796. He graduated from Yale College in 1816. On graduation he went to Ontario County, N. Y., and began the study of law in the office of Spencer Coleman, Esq, of Bloomfield. In November, 1818, he entered the office of the Hon. John C. Spencer, of Canandaigua, in the same county, where he continued for one year, or until admitted to the bar. On January 1, 1820, he opened an office in the village of Canandaigua, and soon won his way to public confidence and to success in his profession. In 1836, and the three succeeding years, he was elected to the New York State Assembly. In 1840 he removed to Marshall, Michigan, to take charge of a large estate there. In 1846 he was a member of the Michigan State Senate, but in 1848 he returned to Canandaigua and resumed the practice of the law. He was appointed by Governor Hamilton Fish, in March 1850, a justice of the Supreme Court of New York, to fill an unexpired term of nearly two years, being also ex-officio Associate Justice of the New York Court of Appeals. He also held the office of Judge of the County Court from 1856 to 1860. He received the honorary degree of Doctor of Laws from Yale in 1869. He was a deacon of the Congregational Church in Canandaigua, from 1828 until his death, except during the period of his residence in Michigan. On October 4, 1832, he married Martha C, the eldest daughter of Thomas Masters, a distinguished shipping merchant of New York City, who died in 1884. They had no children. Taylor died in Canandaigua, December 17, 1888, aged nearly 93 years. He was the last survivor of his college class, and the oldest member of the bar in the State of New York.
