= Henry Gordon Taylor =

New Zealand Anglican priest and military chaplain

Henry Gordon Taylor DSO OBE
- Church: Anglican

Personal details
- Born: 12 March 1908 Foster, Victoria, Australia
- Died: 18 November 1987 (aged 79) Auckland, New Zealand
- Education: University of Auckland (BA)

Henry Gordon Taylor DSO OBE (12 March 1908 in Foster, Victoria – 18 November 1987 in Auckland) was a New Zealand Anglican priest and military chaplain.

He was born in Foster, Victoria, Australia in 1908. As a child, his family moved to New Zealand. There, he received a BA degree from University of Auckland.
