= Jack Taylor (Colorado politician) =

American politician (1935–2020)

John W. Taylor (November 22, 1935 – April 21, 2020) was an American politician and businessman.

He was born in Chicago, Illinois, and served in the United States Navy. He received his bachelor's degree from Iowa State University. He lived in Steamboat Springs, Colorado and was involved in the coal mining and real estate businesses. Taylor served as a member of the Colorado House of Representatives from 1992 to 2000 and the Colorado Senate from 2000 to 2008 and was a Republican.

Taylor died from COVID-19 on April 21, 2020, at Casey's Pond Living Facility in Steamboat Springs, Colorado, during the COVID-19 pandemic in Colorado. He was 84.
