= Henry Taylor (politician) =

Henry Taylor (1872 or 1873–1957) was a unionist politician in Northern Ireland.

Taylor worked as a clothier and joined the Ulster Unionist Party. Despite having no previous political experience, he was elected to the Senate of Northern Ireland in 1938, and served until his death in 1957.
