= List of people with surname Taylor =

Taylor is an English occupational surname of Norman origin. Listed here are notable people who share this surname.

== Art ==
- Josephine Taylor (born 1977), American artist
- Katherine C Taylor (born 1974), American artist
- Leonard Campbell Taylor (1874–1969), English painter and war artist
- Lucy D. Taylor (died 1965), American author, educator, and interior designer
- Lynne Taylor-Corbett (1956–2025), American choreographer, director, lyricist, and composer
- Mary Taylor (born 1948), New Zealand artist
- Pam Taylor (1929–2014), British sculptor
- Persis Goodale Thurston Taylor (1821–1906), American/Hawaiian painter and sketch artist
- Tanya Taylor, Canadian fashion designer

== Business ==
- Alec Taylor Sr. (1821–1894), British racehorse trainer
- Alec Taylor Jr. (1862–1943), British racehorse trainer
- Cora V. Taylor (1884–1971), American businesswoman
- E. P. Taylor (1901–1989), Canadian businessman and horse breeder
- Frank Taylor (1905–1995), English businessman, founder of Taylor Woodrow
- Frederick Southgate Taylor (1847–1896), American businessman, politician and founder of Pi Kappa Alpha fraternity
- Frederick Winslow Taylor (1856–1915), American engineer and management scholar
- Jack C. Taylor (1923–2016), founder of Enterprise Rent-a-Car
- John Taylor (Taylor Ham) (1837–1909), American businessman
- John William Taylor (1827–1906), British bellfounder
- Margarita Kearney Taylor (1890–1982), British-born Spanish businesswoman
- Rebecca Taylor (born 1969), New Zealand-born fashion designer
- William Lee Taylor (1854–1915) African American Baptist minister, bank president, businessman, farmer

== Entertainment ==
- Al Taylor (actor) (1887–1951), American silent film actor
- Alex Taylor (singer) (1947–1993), American singer
- Andy Taylor (born 1961), English guitarist with Duran Duran
- Astra Taylor (born 1979), Canadian-American documentary filmmaker
- Aston George Taylor Jr. (born 1968), American disc jockey, rapper, record producer, actor, and host; better known as Funkmaster Flex
- Avonne Taylor (1897 or 1898–1992), American showgirl and actress.
- Buck Taylor (born 1938), American actor and artist
- Cecil Taylor (1929–2018), American pianist and poet
- Chip Taylor (1940–2026), American songwriter and singer
- Christine Taylor (born 1971), American actress, wife of Ben Stiller
- Corey Taylor (born 1973), American musician, best known as the lead singer of Slipknot
- Courtenay Taylor (born 1969), American voice actress
- Danica Taylor (born 2001), English television personality
- Dave D. Taylor, game programmer formerly employed by id Software
- Dean Taylor (musician), American rock guitarist
- Deems Taylor (Joseph Deems Taylor, 1885–1966), American composer, music critic, and promoter of classical music
- Demetria Taylor (born 1973), American Chicago blues singer and songwriter
- Dick Taylor (born 1943), English musician and early Rolling Stones bassist
- Don Taylor (American filmmaker) (1920–1998), American actor and film director
- Dorothy Brenda Taylor (1909–1996), better known as Brenda Forbes, British-born American actress
- Dub Taylor (1907–1994), American actor
- Ebo Taylor (1936–2026), Ghanaian guitarist, composer, bandleader and arranger
- Eddie Taylor (1923–1985), American electric blues guitarist and singer
- Eddie Taylor Jr. (1972–2019), American blues guitarist, singer and songwriter
- Elizabeth Taylor (1932–2011), English-American actress
- Estelle Taylor (1894–1958), American actress, singer, model, and animal rights activist
- Eva Taylor (1895–1977), American blues singer and stage actress
- Gene Taylor (1929–2001), American jazz double bassist
- Gwen Taylor (born 1939), English actress
- Hound Dog Taylor (1915–1975), American blues guitarist, singer and bandleader
- Iris Taylor (1905–1980), pseudonym of Scottish composer of light music (aka Fred Hartley)
- Jack Taylor (actor) (1926–2026), American actor
- Jack Taylor (heavyweight man) (c. 1946–2006), heaviest man in Britain at his death
- Jack Taylor (musician) (1965–1997)
- James Taylor (born 1948), American singer-songwriter
- James "J.T." Taylor (born 1953), lead singer of Kool & the Gang
- Jane Taylor (1783–1824), English poet and novelist, wrote "Twinkle, Twinkle, Little Star"
- Janie Taylor, American ballet dancer, former New York City Ballet principal dancer
- The Game (born Jayceon Terrell Taylor in 1979), American rapper
- Jen Taylor (born 1973), American actress
- Joanna Taylor (born 1978), English actress and former model
- John Taylor (bass guitarist) (born 1960), British co-founder of Duran Duran
- Johnnie Taylor (1934–2000), American singer-songwriter
- Johnny Taylor, Jr., stand-up comedian
- Little Johnny Taylor (1943–2002), American singer
- Kate Taylor (born 1949), American singer-songwriter
- Karen Taylor (comedian) (born 1979), British comedian
- Koko Taylor (1928–2009), American singer
- Krissy Taylor (1978–1995), American model and sister of Niki Taylor
- Larry Taylor (1942–2019), American bass guitarist, member of the rock band Canned Heat
- Lili Taylor (born 1967), American actress
- Livingston Taylor (born 1950), American singer-songwriter
- M. Sayle Taylor (1889–1942), American radio host
- Maria Taylor (musician) (born 1976), American singer
- Melvin Taylor (born 1959), American musician
- Mick Taylor (born 1949), English guitarist, formerly with the Rolling Stones
- Nicole Taylor, Scottish screenwriter
- Niki Taylor (born 1975), American model and business woman
- Niti Taylor (born 1994), Indian model and actress
- Noah Taylor (born 1969), Australian actor
- Otis Taylor (born 1948), American musician
- Paul Taylor (choreographer) (1930–2018), American dancer and choreographer
- Paula Taylor (born 1983) Thai actress and model
- R. Dean Taylor (1939–2022), Canadian singer-songwriter
- Ralph Forbes Taylor (1904–1951), better known as Ralph Forbes, English actor
- Regina Taylor (born 1960), American actress and playwright
- Renée Taylor (born 1933), American actress, screenwriter, playwright, producer, and director
- Rip Taylor (1934–2019), American actor and comedian
- Robert Taylor (1911–1969), American actor
- Rod Taylor (1932–2015), Australian actor
- Rod Taylor (singer) (born 1957), Jamaican singer
- Roger Taylor (Duran Duran drummer) (born 1960)
- Roger Taylor (Queen drummer) (born 1949)
- Ronnie Taylor (1924–2018), British cinematographer
- Russi Taylor (1944–2019), American voice actress
- Ruth Taylor (actress) (1908–1984), American film actress, starred in silent movies
- Sarah Taylor (personality), Canadian television personality
- Sean Taylor (musician) (born 1968), Australian guitarist in the band Newsboys
- Sharon Taylor, Canadian actress
- Shaun Taylor-Corbett (born 1978), American actor, singer, and writer
- Shooby Taylor (1929–2003), American singer
- Steve Taylor (born 1957), American recording artist and film director
- Steve Taylor (actor, born 1939) (born Richard Cole, 1939–1986), American gay porn actor and producer
- Teyana Taylor (born 1990), American singer, actress, dancer and choreographer
- Tiffany Taylor (born 1977), American model
- Tim Brooke-Taylor (1940–2020), English comic actor
- Trina (born Katrina Laverne Taylor in 1978), American rapper
- Vaughn Taylor (actor) (1910–1983), American actor
- Veronica Taylor (born 1978), American voice actress
- Vin Taylor (1896–1961), American film set designer
- Vincent Taylor (musician) (1949–1974), American guitarist with band Sha Na Na

== Journalism and literature ==
- Brandon Taylor (born 1989), American writer
- Bride Neill Taylor (1858–1937), American journalist and author
- Blaine B. Taylor (1946–2021), American author, journalist, political aide, and Vietnam War veteran
- Cory Taylor (writer) (1955–2016), Australian writer
- D. J. Taylor (born 1960), British author
- David Taylor (veterinary surgeon) (1934–2013), British author and television presenter on animal subjects
- Edgar Taylor (translator) (1793–1839), first English translator of Grimms' Tales
- Emily Taylor (1795–1872), English schoolmistress, poet, children's writer, hymn-writer
- George Augustine Taylor (1872–1928), Australian artist and journalist
- G. P. Taylor (born 1958), British author
- John Ellor Taylor (1837–1895), English popular science writer, journalist and museum curator
- Kathrine Taylor (1903–1996), American author, known mostly for her Address Unknown (1938)
- Matt Taylor (meteorologist) (born 1976), BBC weather presenter
- Minnetta Theodora Taylor (1860–1911), American author, known for writing the lyrics to the National Suffrage Anthem
- Nicole A. Taylor, American writer and cookbook author
- Patrick Gordon Taylor (1896–1966), Australian author and aviator
- Russell Taylor (cartoonist) (born 1960), British writer and cartoonist
- Ruth Ashton Taylor (1922–2024), American television journalist
- Samuel W. Taylor (1907–1997), American novelist, scriptwriter, and historian
- Sean Taylor (author) (born 1965), British children's book author
- Sharma Taylor (fl. 2026), Jamaican writer
- Talus Taylor (1929–2015), American children's book author
- Tom Taylor (writer) (born 1978), Australian playwright and editorial writer
- Valerie Taylor (novelist) (1913–1997), American writer of lesbian pulp fiction
- William Taylor (man of letters) (1765–1836), English scholar and linguist

== Liberal arts and sciences ==
- A. J. Taylor (1911–2002), English historian
- A. J. P. Taylor (1906–1990), English historian
- Alan D. Taylor (born 1947), mathematician
- Alfred Edward Taylor (1869–1945), British philosopher
- Alonzo E. Taylor (died 1949), American educator and food researcher
- Allen Taylor (scientist), scientist
- Andrew Taylor (poet) (born 1940), Australian poet, professor
- Anna Heyward Taylor (1879–1956), American artist
- Bert Leston Taylor (1866–1921), American columnist, humorist, poet, and author
- Brook Taylor (1685–1731), English mathematician
- Charles Taylor (philosopher) (born 1931), Canadian philosopher
- Charles Vincent Taylor (1885–1946), American biologist
- Charlotte De Bernier Taylor (1806–1863), American entomologist
- Dwight Willard Taylor (1932–2006), American malacologist
- Edward Taylor (c. 1642–1729), colonial American poet, physician, and pastor
- Edwin F. Taylor (1931–2025), American physicist
- Effie J. Taylor (1874–1970), Canadian nurse
- Esther W. Taylor (1826–1904), American physician
- Eva Germaine Rimington Taylor (1879–1966), English geographer and historian of science
- F. Sherwood Taylor (1897–1956), British historian of science and museum curator
- Fred M. Taylor (1855–1932), American economist
- Frederick Taylor (historian) (born 1947), British historian
- Garth Taylor (ophthalmologist) (1944–2005), Jamaican ophthalmologist
- Geoffrey Ingram Taylor (1886–1975), British physicist and mathematician
- George Taylor (botanist) (1904–1993), Scottish botanist
- George Ledwell Taylor (1788–1873), English architect
- George W. Taylor (professor) (1901–1972), American academic and labor mediator
- Henry Osborn Taylor (1856–1941), American historian and legal scholar
- Isaac M. Taylor (1921–1996), American physician and academic
- Jill Bolte Taylor (born 1959), American neuroanatomist
- John B. Taylor (born 1946), American economist
- John Bryan Taylor (1928–2026), English physicist
- John George Taylor (fl. 1851–1861), British official of the Foreign Office, an archaeologist investigating the antiquities of the Middle East
- Joseph L. Taylor (1941–2016), American mathematician
- Laurie Taylor (sociologist) (born 1936), English sociologist and radio presenter
- Margerie Venables Taylor (1881–1963), English historian and archeologist
- Matt Taylor (born 1973), project scientist for the Rosetta mission
- Richard Taylor (mathematician) (born 1962), British mathematician
- Ruth Taylor (poet) (1961–2006), Canadian poet, editor and college professor
- Stuart Ross Taylor (1925–2021), New Zealand geochemist and planetary scientist
- Thomas Taylor (neoplatonist) (1758–1835), English translator and Neoplatonist
- Thomas Taylor (botanist) (1786–1848), English botanist, bryologist, and mycologist
- Verta Taylor (born 1948), American sociologist

== Military ==
- David W. Taylor (1864–1940), U.S. Navy admiral and engineer
- Edgar Taylor (aviator) (1897–1918), American flying ace of World War I
- Frank Harold Taylor (1896–1985), British Canadian military pilot
- George Taylor (Alamo defender) (c. 1816–1836), soldier in Texas army, died in the Battle of the Alamo
- George A. Taylor (1899–1969), American army officer at D-Day invasion, Battle of Normandy
- George P. Taylor (fl. 1975–2007), American Air Force Surgeon General
- George W. Taylor (general) (1808–1862), American Civil War general
- Herbert Taylor (British Army officer) (1775–1839), adjutant general and private secretary to the British monarch
- Kenneth M. Taylor (1919–2006), American pilot in World War II
- Maxwell Davenport Taylor (1901–1987), American general and diplomat
- Merrill Samuel Taylor (1893–1918), Canadian flying ace
- Richard Taylor (Confederate general) (1826–1879), son of U.S. President Zachary Taylor and Confederate general in the American Civil War
- Sarah Taylor (soldier) (1831–1872), American Civil War soldier

== Politics and law ==
- Abby Taylor (born 1985), Tobago politician
- Alfred A. Taylor (1848–1931), governor and U.S. Representative from Tennessee
- Angus Taylor (born 1966), Australian federal politician
- Anna Taylor (nutritionist) (fl. 2026), British food specialist
- Breonna Taylor (1993–2020), shooting victim of Louisville Metro Police Department, for whom proposed legislation is named
- Bronnie Taylor, New South Wales politician
- Casper R. Taylor Jr. (1934–2023), Maryland politician
- Charles G. Taylor (born 1948), former president of Liberia
- Charles Taylor (North Carolina politician) (born 1941), former U.S. Congressman from North Carolina
- Lady Bird Johnson (born Claudia Alta Taylor, 1912–2007), First Lady of the United States 1963–1969
- Dave Taylor (Canadian politician) (born 1953), Alberta politician
- David Taylor (Green politician) (born 1957 or 1958), UK politician
- David Taylor (North West Leicestershire MP) (1946–2009), English politician, MP 1997–2009
- David James Taylor (1889–1969), Ontario politician
- Dean P. Taylor (1902–1977), American Congressman from New York
- Del Taylor, American politician
- Dick Taylor (Iowa politician) (born 1931), Iowa state representative
- Dorothy Mae Taylor (1928–2000), African-American politician and civil rights activist from New Orleans, Louisiana
- Fawcett Taylor (1878–1940), Canadian politician and judge
- Gary Taylor (politician), American politician
- George Taylor (Pennsylvania politician) (c. 1716–1781), signer of the U.S. Declaration of Independence
- George Taylor (Canadian politician) (1840–1919), Canadian House of Commons member
- George Taylor (New York politician) (1820–1894), American Congressman from New York
- George Sylvester Taylor (1822–1910), American Massachusetts State senator
- George W. Taylor (Alabama politician) (1849–1932), American Congressman from Alabama
- George William Taylor (born 1937), Canadian solicitor general
- Horatio T. Taylor (1827–1905), American politician in Wisconsin
- Hoyt Patrick Taylor (1890–1964), American politician
- Hoyt Patrick Taylor Jr. (1924–2018), American politician
- Ian Taylor (British politician) (born 1945), member of the Conservative Party
- James Madison Taylor, aka Matt Taylor (fl. 1868–1886), early Idaho settler and builder of the Taylor Bridge in what is now Idaho Falls
- J. Paul Taylor (1920–2023), American politician and educator
- Kim Taylor (born 1978), American politician from Virginia
- Lara Taylor-Pearce, Sierra Leonean auditor general
- Larry Gene Taylor (1953–2005), American Missouri State senator
- Leah Taylor Roy (born 1960), Canadian politician
- Len Taylor (born 1952), Canadian politician
- Lena Taylor (born 1966), American politician
- Maretta Taylor (1935–2013), American politician
- Mary Taylor (politician) (born 1966), American politician from Ohio
- Matthew Taylor (Labour politician) (born 1960), chief executive of the Royal Society of Arts, formerly advisor to Tony Blair and director of the IPPR
- Matthew Taylor (Liberal politician) (born 1963), Cornish Liberal Democrat MP
- Mildred F. Taylor (1905–1981), American politician from New York
- Morvalden Angerstoff Taylor (1830–1925), American politician and farmer from Minnesota
- Paula Losoya Taylor (1???–1902), Texan early settler and developer of Del Rio, Texas
- Rebecca Taylor (politician) (born 1975), English politician
- Recy Taylor (1919–2017), African-American civil rights activist
- Roy A. Taylor (1910–1995), U.S. Congressman from North Carolina
- R. S. Taylor, North Carolina reconstruction era American politician
- Sam T. Taylor (1903–1977), Colorado state senator
- Sarah Knox Taylor (1814–1835), daughter of US president Zachary Taylor and wife of Jefferson Davis
- Sequanna Taylor (born 1979), Wisconsin politician
- Sophia Taylor (1847–1930), New Zealand suffragist and landowner
- Steve Taylor (politician) (born 1956), Delaware State legislator
- Steven W. Taylor (born 1949), Oklahoma Supreme Court justice
- Sylvester Taylor II, American politician
- Thomas Taylor, Baron Taylor of Blackburn (1929–2016), British Labour Party politician
- Thomas Wardlaw Taylor (1833–1917), Canadian lawyer and judge
- William B. Taylor Jr. (born 1947), ambassador to Ukraine from 2006 to 2009, and chargé d'affaires 2019 to 2020
- William Lamborn Taylor (1850–1940), American politician from Indiana
- William Lewis Taylor (1931–2010), American civil rights attorney
- Zachary Taylor (1784–1850), 12th president of the United States

== Religion ==
- Frederick Howard Taylor (1862–1946), British pioneer Protestant Christian missionary to China
- John Taylor (Mormon) (1808–1887), third president of the LDS Church
- Mary Virginia Taylor (born 1950), American bishop in the United Methodist Church
- Michael Taylor (British killer) (born c. 1944), Englishman accused in the Ossett murder case
- Polk Taylor (1833–1934), American formerly enslaved Methodist minister
- Sarah Katherine Taylor (1847–1920), American evangelist in the Advent Christian Church

== Sports ==
- Alan Taylor (footballer, born 1953), English footballer
- Alastair Taylor (footballer) (born 1991), English footballer
- Alfie Taylor (born 2004), English footballer
- Ally Taylor (born 2001), Scottish footballer
- Alontae Taylor (born 1998), American football player
- Angelo Taylor (born 1978), American Olympic gold medalist athlete and coach
- Blake Taylor (born 1995), American baseball player
- Branson Taylor (born 2002), American football player
- Brian Taylor (cricketer) (1932–2017), English cricketer
- Bud Taylor (1903–1962), American bantamweight boxer
- Bud Taylor (golfer) (1916–1991), American amateur golfer
- Celeste Taylor (born 2001), American basketball player
- Charlie Taylor (rugby league) (1921–2013), English rugby league footballer
- Chris Taylor (baseball) (born 1990), American baseball player
- Christian Taylor (athlete) (born 1990), American track and field athlete
- Chuck Taylor (salesman) (1901–1969), basketball player and sneaker pioneer
- Chum Taylor (1927–2025), Australian motorcycle speedway rider
- Chyna Taylor (born 2009), American ice hockey player
- Colin Taylor (footballer, born 1940) (1940–2005), association (soccer) footballer of the 1950s, 1960s and 1970s
- Colin Taylor (footballer, born 1971) association (soccer) footballer of the 1990s
- Colin Taylor (rugby league) (born 1938), English rugby league footballer
- Danielle Taylor (footballer), New Zealand international football (soccer) player
- Darrell Taylor (born 1997), American football player
- Davion Taylor (born 1998), American football player
- Demetrius Taylor (born 1999), American football player
- Dennis Taylor (born 1949), Northern Irish snooker player
- Derrick Taylor (born 1964), American football player
- Deshon Taylor (born 1996), American basketball player
- Devin Taylor (American football) (born 1989), American football player
- Dick Taylor (Australian rules footballer) (1901–1962)
- Dick Taylor (football manager) (fl. 1960s), English manager of Aston Villa F.C.
- Digby Taylor (1941–2017), New Zealand sailor
- Diljeet Taylor (born 1977), American track and field coach
- Durell Taylor, American football player
- D'Shon Taylor (born 1993), Bahamian basketball player
- Elijah Taylor (rugby league) (born 1990), New Zealand rugby league player
- Ellis Taylor (born 2003), English footballer
- F. Morgan Taylor Jr. (1931–2010), American athlete and businessman
- Fred Taylor (running back) (born 1976), American NFL running back
- Fred Taylor (basketball player) (born 1948), American former NBA player
- Fred Taylor (basketball coach) (1924–2002), American college basketball coach
- Fred Taylor (football coach) (1920–2013), American college football coach at Texas Christian University
- Fred Taylor (footballer, born 1884) (died 1954), English footballer, played for Chelsea 1909–1919
- Frederick "Cyclone" Taylor (1884–1970), Canadian ice hockey forward
- Gary Taylor-Fletcher (born 1981), English footballer, played for Blackpool F.C.
- George Taylor (manager) (1853–1911), American Brooklyn Dodgers manager
- Graham Taylor (1944–2017), English footballer
- Herbie Taylor (1889–1973), South African cricketer
- Ian Taylor (field hockey) (born 1954), English gold medalist at 1988 Seoul Olympics
- Ian Taylor (footballer, born 1948), Scottish footballer, played for Aberdeen
- Ian Taylor (footballer, born 1968), English footballer, played for Aston Villa
- Isaiah Taylor (born 1994), American basketball player in the Israeli Basketball Premier League
- J. J. Taylor (born 1998), American football player
- Ja'Sir Taylor (born 1999), American football player
- Jawaan Taylor (born 1997), American football player
- Jeff Taylor (basketball) (born 1960), American basketball player
- Jeff Taylor (footballer) (1930–2010), English footballer
- Jeffery Taylor (born 1989), Swedish basketball player; son of basketball player Jeff Taylor
- Jermain Taylor (born 1978), American boxer, former undisputed middleweight champion of the world
- Jerome Taylor (born 1984), Jamaican cricketer
- Jim Taylor (fullback) (1935–2018), Green Bay Packers player
- Candy Jim Taylor (1884–1948), American Negro league baseball player and manager
- J'Mari Taylor (born 2002), American football player
- Jodie Taylor (born 1986), English association football player
- John Taylor (rugby league), British rugby league footballer of the 1950s and 1960s
- Joni Taylor (born 1979), American basketball coach
- Josh Taylor (baseball) (born 1993), American baseball player
- Julie Ann Taylor (born 1961), American voice actress
- Jullian Taylor (born 1995), American football player
- Kamario Taylor (born 2007), American football player
- Kameron Taylor (born 1994), American basketball player for Maccabi Tel Aviv in the Israeli Basketball Premier League and the EuroLeague
- Ken Taylor (footballer, born 1931) (died 2016), English footballer
- Kenneth Taylor (footballer, born 2002), Dutch footballer
- Kris Taylor (born 1984), English footballer
- Lane Taylor (born 1989), American football player
- Laura Taylor (born 1999), Australian swimmer
- Lawrence Taylor (born 1959), New York Giants
- Leanne Taylor (born 1992), Canadian paratriathlete
- Lewis Taylor (Australian footballer) (born 1995), Australian rules footballer
- Levonta Taylor (born 1997), American football player
- Lindsay Taylor (born 1981), American basketball player
- Logan Taylor (born 2002), Canadian football player
- Lorraine Taylor (born 1961), New Zealand international football (soccer) player
- Maik Taylor (born 1971), German-British association football goalkeeper
- Malik Taylor (American football) (born 1995), American football player
- Mason Taylor (born 2004), American football player
- Matt Taylor (footballer, born 1982), English football player
- Matthew Taylor (footballer) (born 1981), English football player, played in the Premier League
- Megan Taylor (1920–1993), British Olympic speed skater
- Michael A. Taylor (born 1991), American baseball player
- Mike Taylor (basketball coach) (born 1972), American basketball coach
- Morgan Taylor (1903–1975), American hurdler
- Natalie Taylor (basketball) (born 1984), New Zealand basketball player
- Nicolas Taylor (racing driver) (born 2005), Canadian racing driver
- Oliver Taylor (boxer) (1938–2000), Australian bantamweight boxer
- Oliver Taylor (footballer, born 1869) (1869–1945), Wales international footballer
- Oliver Taylor (footballer, born 1880) (1880–?), English footballer
- Ollie Taylor (1947–2025), American basketball player
- Olly Taylor (born 1993), English footballer
- Orville Taylor (born 1970), Jamaican track and field sprinter
- Otis Taylor (American football) (1942–2023), American football player
- Penny Taylor (born 1981), Australian basketball player
- Peta Taylor (1912–1989), English cricketer
- Phil Taylor (darts player) (born 1960), English darts player, 16 time world champion
- Phil Taylor (footballer, born 1917) (died 2012), English footballer and former manager of Liverpool FC
- Rachel Taylor (rugby player) (born 1983), Welsh rugby union player
- Reese Taylor (born 1999), American football player
- Richie Taylor, English footballer
- Rhys Taylor (born 1990), Welsh footballer
- Rob Taylor (footballer, born 1985), English footballer
- Roc Taylor (born 2002), American football player
- Ron Taylor (baseball) (1937–2025), Canadian physician and earlier a professional baseball player
- Ron Taylor (diver) (1934–2012), Australian underwater diver, shark expert and film maker
- Ron Taylor (footballer) (1932–2015), VFL footballer and Olympic boxer
- Ron Taylor (American football) (1???–2014), American football coach and player
- Ron Taylor (rugby league) (1932–2023), Australian rugby player
- Tiny Ron Taylor (1947–2019), American film actor and basketball player
- Ron Taylor (bowls), Australian bowls international
- Ross Taylor (born 1984), New Zealand cricketer
- Samad Taylor (born 1998), American baseball player
- Sarah Taylor (cricketer) (born 1989), English cricketer
- Sarah Taylor (tennis) (born 1981), American tennis player
- Sean Taylor (1983–2007), American football player
- Shakial Taylor (born 1996), American football player
- Shaun Taylor (born 1963), British footballer
- Stafanie Taylor (born 1991), Jamaica and West Indies cricketer
- Steven Taylor (born 1986), British footballer, played for Newcastle United
- Taywan Taylor (born 1995), American football player
- Terry Taylor (born 1955), American retired professional wrestler
- Tory Taylor (born 1997), Australian American football player
- Trent Taylor (born 1994), American football player
- Trey Taylor (born 2001), American football player
- Tugboat Taylor (1945–2017), American professional wrestler
- Tyrod Taylor (born 1989), American football player
- Tyrone Taylor (born 1994), American baseball player
- Vaughn Taylor (golfer) (born 1976), American golfer
- Vincent Taylor (American football) (born 1994), American football player
- Wade Taylor IV (born 2003), American basketball player
- W. F. Taylor (1877–1945), founding president of the Canadian Amateur Hockey Association
- Zac Taylor (born 1983), American football head coach of Cincinnati Bengals

== Disambiguation pages ==
- Alexander Taylor (disambiguation)
- Andrew Taylor (disambiguation)
- Ann Taylor (disambiguation)
- Billy Taylor (disambiguation)
- Charles Taylor (disambiguation)
- Chris Taylor (disambiguation)
- Christopher Taylor (disambiguation)
- David Taylor (disambiguation)
- Dean Taylor (disambiguation)
- Derek Taylor (disambiguation)
- Dick Taylor (disambiguation)
- Edward Taylor (disambiguation)
- Fred Taylor (disambiguation)
- Geoffrey Taylor (disambiguation)
- George Taylor (disambiguation)
- Grant Taylor (disambiguation)
- Greg Taylor (disambiguation)
- Harry Taylor (disambiguation)
- Henry Taylor (disambiguation)
- Hudson Taylor (disambiguation)
- Isaac Taylor (disambiguation)
- Jack Taylor (disambiguation)
- Jake Taylor (disambiguation)
- James Taylor (disambiguation)
- Jason Taylor (disambiguation)
- Jeffrey Taylor (disambiguation)
- Jeremy Taylor (disambiguation)
- Jim Taylor (disambiguation)
- John Taylor (disambiguation)
- Jonathan Taylor (disambiguation)
- Keith Taylor (disambiguation)
- Larry Taylor (disambiguation)
- Leo Taylor (disambiguation)
- Leonard Taylor (disambiguation)
- Mark Taylor (disambiguation)
- Martin Taylor (disambiguation)
- Mary Taylor (disambiguation)
- Matthew Taylor (disambiguation)
- Michael Taylor (disambiguation)
- Mike Taylor (disambiguation)
- Patrick Taylor (disambiguation)
- Paul Taylor (disambiguation)
- Richard Taylor (disambiguation)
- Robert Taylor (disambiguation)
- Sarah Taylor (disambiguation)
- Sean Taylor (disambiguation)
- Stephen Taylor (disambiguation)
- Steven Taylor (disambiguation)
- Tom Taylor (disambiguation)
- Troy Taylor (disambiguation)
- Valerie Taylor (disambiguation)
- Walter Taylor (disambiguation)
- William Taylor (disambiguation)

== Fictional characters ==
- Allison Taylor, recurring character in the TV series 24
- Sheriff Andy Taylor (The Andy Griffith Show), main character in the TV series The Andy Griffith Show
- Danny Taylor, main character in the TV series Without a Trace
- George Taylor, main character in the film Planet of the Apes
- Griffin Pierce-Taylor, character in Degrassi: The Next Generation
- Jennifer Taylor (Queer As Folk), minor character in the TV series Queer as Folk
- Justin Taylor, major character in the TV series Queer as Folk
- Karen Taylor, in the BBC soap opera EastEnders
- Kelly Taylor (90210), major character in the Beverly Hills, 90210 franchise
- Mac Taylor, major character in the TV series CSI: NY
- Mary Taylor (Coronation Street), portrayed since 2008 by Patti Clare on British soap opera
- Opie Taylor, son of the aforementioned Sheriff Andy Taylor in The Andy Griffith Show
- Petra Taylor, character in TV series Brookside
- Rose Taylor, a character from the TV show 7th Heaven
- Steven Taylor (Doctor Who), one of the first companions of the Doctor in the British TV series Doctor Who''
- Tim Taylor (character), main character in the TV series Home Improvement
- Tristan Taylor, minor character in the TV series Yu-Gi-Oh!

== See also ==
- Tylor
