= George Taylor =

George Taylor may refer to:

== Military ==
- George Taylor (Alamo defender) (c. 1816–1836), soldier in Texas army, died in the Battle of the Alamo
- George W. Taylor (general) (1808–1862), American Civil War general, Army of the Potomac
- George Taylor (Medal of Honor) (1830–1893), American Civil War sailor and Medal of Honor recipient
- George A. Taylor (1899–1969), American army officer at D-Day invasion, Battle of Normandy
- George Taylor (British Army officer) (1905–1994), served in World War II, the Korean War, and the Mau Mau campaign
- George P. Taylor (born 1953), American Air Force Surgeon General

== Politics ==
- George Taylor (Virginia politician) (1710–1792), American politician from Virginia
- George Taylor (Pennsylvania politician) (c. 1716–1781), signer of the U.S. Declaration of Independence
- George Taylor (Connecticut politician) (1802–1881), politician and physician
- George Taylor (New York politician) (1820–1894), American congressman from New York
- George Sylvester Taylor (1822–1910), American state senator from Massachusetts
- George E. Taylor (Michigan politician) (1838–1903), Michigan politician and judge
- George Taylor (Canadian politician) (1840–1919), Canadian House of Commons member
- George L. Taylor (1842–1897), physician and political figure in New Brunswick, Canada
- George W. Taylor (Alabama politician) (1849–1932), American congressman from Alabama
- George W. Taylor (Wisconsin politician) (1855–1931), American politician in Wisconsin
- George Edwin Taylor (1857–1925), National Negro Liberty Party candidate for president of the United States, 1904
- George Taylor (Australian politician) (1861–1935), Australian labour leader and member of the Legislative Assembly of Western Australia
- George Cuthbert Taylor (1886–1957), member of the Queensland Legislative Assembly
- George William Taylor (born 1937), Canadian Solicitor General

== Sports ==
- George Taylor (boxer) (fl. 1734–1750), mid-eighteenth century English boxer
- George Taylor (baseball manager) (1853–1911), American baseball manager
- George Taylor (first baseman) (1869–?), Negro leagues first baseman
- George Taylor (Australian rules footballer) (1876–1953), Australian rules footballer who played with South Melbourne
- Baby Taylor (George Ellis Taylor, 1892–1926), American college football player and coach
- George Taylor (footballer, born 1900) (1900–1982), played in the Football League for Brentford and Millwall
- George Taylor (footballer, born 1901), English footballer
- George Taylor (footballer, born 1907) (1907–1951), English football outside right, for Bolton Wanderers, Coventry City and Notts County
- George Taylor (cricketer) (1909–1986), English cricket player
- George Taylor (footballer, born 1909) (1909–?), English football left half
- George Taylor (footballer, born 1915) (1915–1982), Scottish footballer, played for Aberdeen and Plymouth Argyle
- George Taylor (rugby league) (fl. 1900s-1920s), English rugby league footballer
- George Taylor (footballer, born 1920) (1920–1983), English football goalkeeper, played for West Ham United
- George Taylor (footballer, born 1948) (1948–2017), Scottish footballer, played for Grimsby Town
- George Taylor (rugby union) (born 1996), Scottish former rugby union player

== Academics ==
- George Watson-Taylor (1771–1841), British collector
- George Pritchard Taylor (1854–?), grammarian
- George Rogers Taylor (1895–1983), American economic historian of the early republic
- George W. Taylor (professor) (1901–1972), American academic and labor mediator
- George E. Taylor (historian) (1905–2000), American China scholar, University of Washington professor
- George Francis Taylor (died 2011), British historian and archeologist
- George H. Taylor (meteorologist) (1927–2022), director of the Oregon Climate Service at Oregon State University

== Others ==
- George Taylor (priest) (died 1811), Anglican priest
- George Keith Taylor (1769–1815), U.S. federal judge
- George Ledwell Taylor (1788–1873), English architect
- George Taylor (gardener) (1803–1891), introduced celery to the United States
- George H. Taylor (physician) (1821–1896), American physician and inventor
- George Taylor (photographer) (1838–1913), Canadian photographer and painter
- George Augustine Taylor (1872–1928), Australian artist, journalist, and aviation pioneer
- George Caldwell Taylor (1885–1952), U.S. federal judge
- G. I. Taylor (George Ingram Taylor, 1886–1975), British physicist
- George Nicholson Taylor, manager of the Land Credit Bank, convicted of fraud in 1892, in Melbourne, Australia
- George William Taylor, mayor of Prahran and land speculator, in Victoria, Australia
- George Taylor, African-American man lynched on November 5, 1918, lynching of George Taylor
- George A. Taylor (bishop) (1903–1978), American prelate
- Sir George Taylor (botanist) (1904–1993), British botanist, from 1956 to 1971 director of the Royal Botanic Gardens, Kew
- George Taylor (artist) (1914–1996), English commercial artist
- Tony Taylor (GC) (George Anthony Morgan Taylor, 1917–1972), Australian recipient of the George Cross
- George Taylor (DC Comics), fictional character in the DC Comics universe, chief editor of the Daily Star
- Taylor (Planet of the Apes), Colonel George Taylor, fictional hero of the first two films of the original Planet of the Apes series played by Charlton Heston

== See also ==
- Taylor (disambiguation)
- List of people with surname Taylor
