= Oliver Taylor =

Oliver Taylor may refer to:

- Oliver Taylor (actor) (born 1994), British actor
- Oliver Taylor (boxer) (1938–2000), Australian boxer
- Ollie Taylor (1947–2025), American basketball player
- Oliver Taylor (footballer, born 1869) (1869–1945), Wales international footballer
- Oliver Taylor (footballer, born 1880) (1880–?), English footballer
- Olly Taylor (born 1993), English footballer
