= Matthew Taylor =

Matthew, Matt, or Matty Taylor may refer to:

== Arts ==
- Matthew Taylor (bassist), American member of the band Motion City Soundtrack
- Matthew Taylor (composer) (born 1964), English composer
- Matt Taylor (musician) (born 1948), Australian blues musician
- Matthew Taylor (musician) (1968–2026), American musician, member of the band Bellini
- Maddie Taylor (born 1966), American voice actress, formerly known as Matthew Taylor
- Matthew Taylor (sculptor) (1837–1889), English sculptor

== Sport ==
- Matthew Taylor (footballer, born 1981), English football full-back and manager
- Matt Taylor (footballer, born 1982), English football centre-back and manager
- Matty Taylor (footballer, born 1990), English football striker
- Matthew Taylor (cricketer, born 1973), English cricketer
- Matt Taylor (New Zealand cricketer) (born 1992), New Zealand cricketer
- Matthew Taylor (cricketer, born 1994), English cricketer
- Matthew Taylor (cricketer, born 1999), Welsh cricketer
- Matt Taylor (American soccer) (born 1981), American soccer assistant manager for Real Salt Lake and former forward
- Matt Taylor (canoeist) (born 1970), American slalom canoer
- Matt Taylor (rugby union) (born 1972), Scottish rugby coach
- Mattie Taylor (born 1993), Irish Gaelic football right wing-back
- Matthew Taylor (field hockey) (born 2001), Scottish field hockey player

== Politics ==
- Matthew Taylor (political strategist) (born 1960), formerly adviser to Tony Blair and director of the IPPR
- Matthew Taylor, Baron Taylor of Goss Moor (born 1963), Cornish former Liberal Democrat MP
- Matt Taylor (politician) (born 1973), Australian politician

== Other ==
- James Madison Taylor (fl. 1868–1886), aka Matt Taylor, early Idaho settler and builder of the Taylor bridge in what is now Idaho Falls
- Matt Taylor (meteorologist) (born 1976), BBC weather presenter
- Matthew Taylor (architect) (born 1975), architect and campaigner
- Matt Taylor (scientist) (born 1973), project scientist of the Rosetta mission
- Matthew Taylor, author of Techmoan YouTube channel

== See also ==
- Taylor (disambiguation)
- List of people with surname Taylor
