= Sarah Taylor =

Sarah Taylor may refer to:

- Sarah Knox Taylor (1814–1835), daughter of US president Zachary Taylor and wife of Confederate president Jefferson Davis
- Sarah McFarland Taylor (born 1968), academic and author
- Sarah Taylor (personality), Canadian television personality
- Sarah Taylor (vivandière) (1841–1886), American Civil War soldier
- Sarah Taylor (cricketer) (born 1989), English cricketer
- Sarah Taylor (field hockey) (born 1981), Australian field hockey player
- Sarah Taylor (soccer) (born 1996), Canadian soccer player
- Sarah Taylor (squash player) (born 1974), Jersey squash player
- Sarah Taylor (tennis) (born 1981), American tennis player
- Sarah Mary Taylor (1916–2000), African American quiltmaker from Mississippi
- Sarah Taylor (police commissioner) (born 1977), British politician
- Sarah Stewart Taylor (born 1971), American author
- Sarah Katherine Taylor (1847–1920), American evangelist, temperance worker, editor

== See also ==
- Sara Taylor (born 1974), American issue strategist specialising in integrating data and technology
- Taylor (disambiguation)
- List of people with surname Taylor
