= Steve Taylor (disambiguation) =

Steve Taylor (born 1957) is an American musician.

Steve Taylor may also refer to:

- Steve Taylor (actor, born 1939) (1939–1986), American adult film actor, producer, photographer, and entrepreneur
- Steve Taylor (safety) (born 1953), American football player
- Steve Taylor (footballer) (born 1955), English footballer
- Steve Taylor (politician) (born 1956), American politician and Delaware state legislator
- Steve Taylor (field hockey) (born 1960), British field hockey player
- Steve Taylor (runner) (born 1965), American long-distance runner and coach
- Steve Taylor (Canadian football) (born 1967), American football player
- Steve Taylor (psychologist) (born 1967), English author and lecturer in psychology
- Steve Taylor (missiologist) (born 1968), New Zealand theologian

== See also ==
- Steve Taylor & The Perfect Foil, American musical group
- Steven Taylor (disambiguation)
- Stephen Taylor (disambiguation)
