= Mark Taylor =

Mark Taylor may refer to:

== Entertainment ==
- Mark Taylor (animation director) (born 1961), creator of Rubbish, King of the Jumble
- Mark Taylor (Canadian actor) (born 1977), Canadian television actor
- Mark Taylor (drummer) (born 1962), English jazz drummer
- Mark Taylor (French horn) (born 1961), American jazz French horn player
- Mark Taylor (music producer) (born 1962), British record producer and songwriter
- Mark Taylor (sound engineer) (born 1966), sound effects mixer
- Mark L. Taylor (born 1950), American actor and voice actor
- Mark Taylor (Home Improvement), fictional character; youngest son on U.S. TV series Home Improvement

== Politics ==
- Mark Taylor (American politician) (born 1957), lieutenant governor of Georgia
- Mark Taylor (Australian politician) (born 1967), member of the New South Wales Legislative Assembly
- Mark Taylor (Canadian politician) (born 1970), City councillor of Bay Ward in Ottawa

== Sports ==
- Mark Taylor (cricketer) (born 1964), Australian cricketer
- Mark Taylor (footballer, born 1964), striker who played for Blackpool, amongst other clubs
- Mark Taylor (footballer, born 1966), midfielder who played for Walsall, Shrewsbury Town and Hereford United
- Mark Taylor (footballer, born 1974), left back who played for Darlington, Fulham and Northampton
- Mark Taylor (ice hockey, born 1958) (full name Mark C. Taylor), Canadian ice hockey player for the Philadelphia Flyers
- Mark Taylor (ice hockey, born 1962), American ice hockey player and coach
- Mark Taylor (rugby union, born 1951), New Zealand rugby union player
- Mark Taylor (racing driver) (born 1977), British Indy Racing League driver
- Mark Taylor (swimmer) (born 1960), British swimmer
- Mark Taylor (rugby union, born 1973), Welsh rugby union player
- Mark Taylor (curler) (born 1959), American wheelchair curler

== Other ==
- Mark C. Taylor (philosopher) (born 1945), professor of religion at Columbia University, author
- Mark John Taylor, New Zealand ISIS fighter
- Mark Lewis Taylor (born 1951), professor of theology
- Mark P. Taylor (born 1958), professor of economics at the University of Warwick
- Mark Taylor, subject of the film The Trump Prophecy

== See also ==
- Mick Taylor (disambiguation)
