= Andrew Taylor =

Andrew or Andy Taylor may refer to:

== People ==
=== Arts and entertainment ===
- Andy Taylor (guitarist) (born 1961), former guitarist for Duran Duran
- Andrew Taylor (author) (born 1951), British crime novelist
- Andrew Taylor (poet) (born 1940), Australian poet
- Andrew Taylor (painter) (born 1967), Australian painter
- Andrew Eldritch (born 1959), born Andrew Taylor, singer of The Sisters of Mercy

=== Sport ===
- Andrew Taylor (footballer, born 1986), English footballer
- Andy Taylor (footballer, born 1986), English footballer
- Andy Taylor (footballer, born 1988), English footballer
- Andrew Taylor (Australian footballer) (born 1965), Australian rules footballer
- Andrew Taylor (baseball) (born 1986), baseball player
- Andrew Taylor (cricketer) (1838–1901), English cricketer
- Andy Taylor (cricketer) (born 1955), Scottish cricketer
- Andrew Taylor (water polo) (born 1963), Australian former water polo player
- Andrew Taylor (sailor) (born 1963), New Zealand sailor
- Andrew Taylor (cyclist) (born 1985), Australian track cyclist

=== Other fields ===
- Andrew C. Taylor, American businessman, Chairman and CEO of Enterprise Rent-A-Car
- Andrew D. Taylor (born 1950), Scottish physicist
- Andrew Taylor (architect) (1850–1937), British-Canadian architect and politician
- Andrew Taylor (businessman) (born 1957), Chairman of Leicester City F.C.

== Fictional characters ==
- Andy Taylor (The Andy Griffith Show), protagonist of the television series The Andy Griffith Show
- Andrew Taylor, in the 1926 film Aloma of the South Seas
