= Sarah K. Taylor =

Sarah K. Taylor may refer to:

- Sarah Katherine Taylor (1847-1920), American evangelist, temperance worker, editor
- Sarah Knox Taylor (1814-1835), daughter of the 12th U.S. President, Zachary Taylor
