= Christopher Taylor =

Christopher Taylor may refer to:

- Christopher Taylor (archaeologist) (1935–2021), British archaeologist and landscape historian
- Christopher Taylor (game designer) (active since 2005), American game designer
- Christopher Taylor (pianist) (born 1970), American pianist
- Christopher Taylor (politician) (born 1967), American politician and mayor of Ann Arbor, Michigan
- Sohn (musician) (born Christopher Taylor, active since 2012), British electronica musician
- Christopher Taylor (Australian footballer) (born 1966), Australian rules footballer
- Christopher Taylor (sprinter) (born 1999), Jamaican 400 metre runner
- Christopher L. Taylor (1828–1914), Wisconsin state assemblyman

== See also ==
- Chris Taylor (disambiguation)
