= Walter Taylor =

Walter Taylor may refer to:

== Law and politics ==
- Walter C. Taylor (1870–1929), American politician in North Dakota
- Walter Nesbit Taylor (1874–1956), American politician in Mississippi
- Walter Ross-Taylor (1877–1958), Scottish politician

== Sports ==
- Walter Taylor (American football) (1872–1960), American football coach
- Walter Taylor (baseball) (fl. 1905–1909), American baseball player
- Walter Taylor (footballer) (1902–1955), English footballer

== Others ==
- Walter Taylor (mathematician) (c. 1700–1743/4), English mathematician
- Walter Taylor (engineer) (1734–1803), English mechanical engineer
- Walter Ross Taylor (1805–1896), Scottish minister
- Walter David Taylor Powell (1831–1906), English paramilitary officer in Australia
- Walter Ross Taylor (1838–1907), Scottish minister
- Walter H. Taylor (1838–1916), American military officer
- Walter Taylor (contractor) (1872–1955), Australian engineer and builder
- Dub Taylor (Walter Clarence Taylor Jr., 1907–1994), American actor
- Walter Taylor (archaeologist) (1913–1997), American anthropologist and archaeologist
- Buck Taylor (Walter Clarence Taylor III, born 1938), American actor

== See also ==
- Wally Taylor (disambiguation)
