= Dick Taylor (disambiguation) =

Dick Taylor (born 1943) is an English musician, guitarist with The Pretty Things and early bass player for The Rolling Stones.

Dick Taylor may also refer to:

- Dick Taylor (Australian rules footballer) (1901–1962), Australian football centerman
- Dick Taylor (football manager) (1918–1995), English football defender for Grimsby Town and Scunthorpe United, later manager of Aston Villa F.C.
- Dick Taylor (Iowa politician) (1931–2020), Iowa State Representative
- Dick Taylor (runner) (born 1945), British long-distance runner
- Dick Taylor (hurdler) (born 1948), American hurdler, 1970 and 1971 All-American for the Northwestern Wildcats track and field team
- Dick Taylor (footballer, born 1957), English football goalkeeper for Huddersfield Town and York City
- Dick Taylor (rugby) (1942–2019), Australian rugby union and rugby league player

== See also ==
- Dick Tayler (born 1948), former New Zealand runner
- Richard Taylor (disambiguation)
- List of people with surname Taylor
- Taylor (surname)
