= Steven Taylor =

Steven Taylor may refer to:

- Steven Taylor (English cricketer) (born 1963), English cricketer
- Steven Taylor (footballer) (born 1986), English footballer
- Steven Taylor (American cricketer) (born 1993), American cricketer
- Steven W. Taylor (born 1949), American politician and Oklahoma Supreme Court justice
- Steven John Taylor, American singer and keyboardist for the band Rogue Wave
- Steven Taylor (Doctor Who), a character from British TV series Doctor Who

== See also ==
- Steve Taylor (disambiguation)
- Stephen Taylor (disambiguation)
- List of people with surname Taylor
