= Sean Taylor (disambiguation) =

Sean Taylor (1983–2007) was an American football free safety.

Sean Taylor may also refer to:

- Sean Taylor (musician) (born 1968), Australian guitarist
- Sean Taylor (author) (born 1965), British children's book author
- Sean Taylor (footballer) (born 1985), English footballer
- Sean Taylor (writer) (born 1968), comic book, graphic novel and prose writer

== See also ==
- Shaun Taylor (born 1963), British footballer
- Shaun Taylor-Corbett (born 1978), American actor
- List of people with surname Taylor
