= Wally Taylor =

Wally Taylor may refer to:

- Wally Taylor (baseball) (1864–1922), baseball player and manager
- Wally Taylor (footballer) (1926–2005), English footballer
- Wally Taylor (actor) (1930–2012), American actor
- Wally Taylor (boxer) (born 1939), Australian boxer, in the Australian National Boxing Hall of Fame

== See also ==
- Walter Taylor (disambiguation)
