= Mary Taylor =

Mary or Marie Taylor may refer to:

== In advocacy ==
- Mary Taylor (women's rights advocate) (1817–1893), English proponent of feminist ideologies
- Mary Lee Taylor (1891–1944), pseudonym of American advertising executive
- Marie Woolfolk Taylor (1893–1960), African-American co-founder of Alpha Kappa Alpha sorority

== In arts ==
- Mary Perkins Taylor (1875–1931), American Impressionist painter and fabric artist
- Mary Linley Taylor (1889–1982), English stage actress
- Mary Taylor (etcher) (born 1948), New Zealand artist and children's author
- Mary Imlay Taylor, American novelist and short story writer
- Mary Taylor Simeti, née Taylor, American author

== In public service ==
- Mary Jo Taylor (born 1953), American Republican member of Kansas Senate
- Mary Taylor (Ohio politician) (born 1966), American Republican lieutenant governor of Ohio
- Mary Elizabeth Taylor, American assistant secretary of state in 2018–2020

== In science ==
- Mary S. Taylor (1885–before 1976), American bryologist
- Marie Taylor (1911–1990), American botanist
- J. Mary Taylor (1931–2019), American mammalogist
- Mary Taylor Slow (1898–1984), née Taylor, British physicist

== In sports ==
- Peta Taylor (Mary Isabella Taylor, 1912–1989), English cricketer
- Mary Taylor (baseball) (born before 1935), American player in 1953–54
- Mary Taylor (cricketer) (born 2004), English cricketer

== Other uses ==
- Mary Virginia Taylor (born 1950), American bishop in United Methodist Church
- Mary Taylor (Coronation Street), portrayed since 2008 by Patti Clare on British soap opera
- Mary Taylor (pilot boat), 19th-century American yacht
- Mary Taylor, a character from E.T. the Extra Terrestrial

== See also ==
- Maria Taylor (disambiguation)
- List of people with surname Taylor
