= Dean Taylor =

Dean Taylor may refer to:

- Dean P. Taylor (1902–1977), American Congressman from New York
- R. Dean Taylor (1939–2022), Canadian singer-songwriter
- Dean Taylor (baseball) (born 1951), Major League Baseball executive
- Dean Taylor (musician) (late 20th century), American rock guitarist

== See also ==
- Deon Taylor (born 1976), American film director, producer and screenwriter
- List of people with surname Taylor
- Taylor (surname)
