= Christian Taylor =

Christian Taylor may refer to:

- Christian Taylor (athlete) (born 1990), American triple jumper
- Christian Taylor (filmmaker) (born 1968), American screenwriter

== See also ==
- Christian Alusine Kamara-Taylor (1917–1985), Sierra Leonean politician
- Chris Taylor (disambiguation)
