= Maria Taylor =

Maria Taylor may refer to:

- Maria Taylor (sportscaster) (born 1987), American sportscaster
- Maria Taylor (musician) (born 1976), American musician
- Maria Jane Taylor (1837–1870), British missionary to China
- Maria Madeline Taylor, Australian stage actress

== See also ==
- Mary Taylor (disambiguation)
