= Louis M. Hacker =

American economist

- Born: March 17, 1899; New York City, U.S.
- Died: March 22, 1987 (aged 88); Le Roy, New York, U.S.

Academic work
- Discipline: Economic history
- Institutions: Columbia University

Louis Morton Hacker (March 17, 1899 – March 22, 1987) was an American economic historian, Professor of Economics at Columbia University, and founding dean of its School of General Studies, and author. He is known as a leading proponent of adult education.

== Biography ==
Hacker, son of Morris and Celia (Waxelbaum) Hacker, was born and raised in New York City in Williamsburg, a neighborhood in Brooklyn. After attending the Brooklyn Boys' High School, he studied at Columbia College, Columbia University and Columbia University, where he obtained his AB in 1922, and his MA in 1923.

After graduation in 1923 Hacker started as assistant editor at the New International Encyclopedia, and was contributing editor at the New International YearBook. In 1935 he started as lifelong academic career at Columbia University as lecturer in economics. In 1942 he became assistant professor, in 1944 Associate Professor, and in 1948 full Professor. After his retirement in 1967 he was appointed professor emeritus. In 1952 he was the first dean of its School of General Studies, where he served until 1958.

In 1937 he had been visiting professor at the University Wisconsin, in 1939 at the Ohio State University, in 1945 at Utah State Agricultural College (now Utah State University), in 1953 at the University of Hawaii, and in 1970 at the University Puget Sound. In 1948 he had been appointed Harold Vyvyan Harmsworth Professor of American History for one year at the University of Oxford. In addition to the scientific work, he was involved in the American Civil Liberties Union.

Hacker died in Le Roy, New York in 1987 at the age of 88.

== Work ==
Hacker was a leading proponent of adult education. In an interview he had explained:

"Many students come to us 10, 20, 30 years after graduation from high school... They are intelligent and serious but they could not pass a college-entrance examination after such a long interruption of their studies. They want to try a college course, perhaps only one or two, before deciding whether they can go on. We let them try. Why not?"

Hacker's research interests were in the field of American history and its social economic development, as well as the life and work of some of its greatest entrepreneurs such as Andrew Carnegie, Alexander Hamilton and Joseph M. Proskauer.

== Selected publications ==
- Louis M. Hacker, Rudolf Modley and George Rogers Taylor. The United States: A Graphic History,New York, Modern age books, inc, 1938.
- Louis M. Hacker. The Triumph of American Capitalism: The Development of Forces in American History to the End of the Nineteenth Century. Simon and Schuster, New York, 1940.
- Louis M. Hacker. The Shaping of the American Tradition. Columbia University Press, New York, 1947.
- Louis M. Hacker & Benjamin Burks Kendrick. The United States since 1865. Appleton-Century-Crofts, New York, 1949 (prior editions in 1932, 1934, and 1939).
- Louis M. Hacker (1954). "The Anticapitalist Bias of American Historians". In Hayek, F. A. (ed.). Capitalism and the Historians. Chicago: The Chicago University Press. pp. 64 - 92 – via Internet Archive.
- Louis M. Hacker, Alexander Hamilton in the American Tradition. McGraw-Hill Book Company, Inc., New York, 1957.
- Louis M. Hacker. The World of Andrew Carnegie: 1865-1901. Lippincott, Philadelphia 1968.
