= Patrick Taylor =

Patrick or Pat Taylor may refer to:

- Patrick Taylor (American football) (born 1998), American football running back
- Patrick Taylor (author) (born 1941), Irish-Canadian author and doctor
- Patrick Taylor (politician) (1862–1922), Australian politician
- Patrick F. Taylor (1937–2004), founder of Taylor Energy
- Gordon Taylor (aviator) (Patrick Gordon Taylor, 1896–1966), author and aviator
- C. Pat Taylor (born 1945), president of Southwest Baptist University
- Pat Taylor (baseball) (1899–1979), American baseball player
- Patrick Taylor, actor in Assassination of a High School President

== See also ==
- Taylor (surname)
- Hoyt Patrick Taylor (1890–1964), lieutenant governor of North Carolina
- Hoyt Patrick Taylor Jr. (1924–2018), North Carolina politician
