= Pam Taylor =

Welsh sculptor (1929 – 2014)

Pam Taylor ARBS (1929–2014) was a Welsh sculptor. She created many bronze sculptures by commission, including several memorials relating to the Royal Air Force.

== Life ==
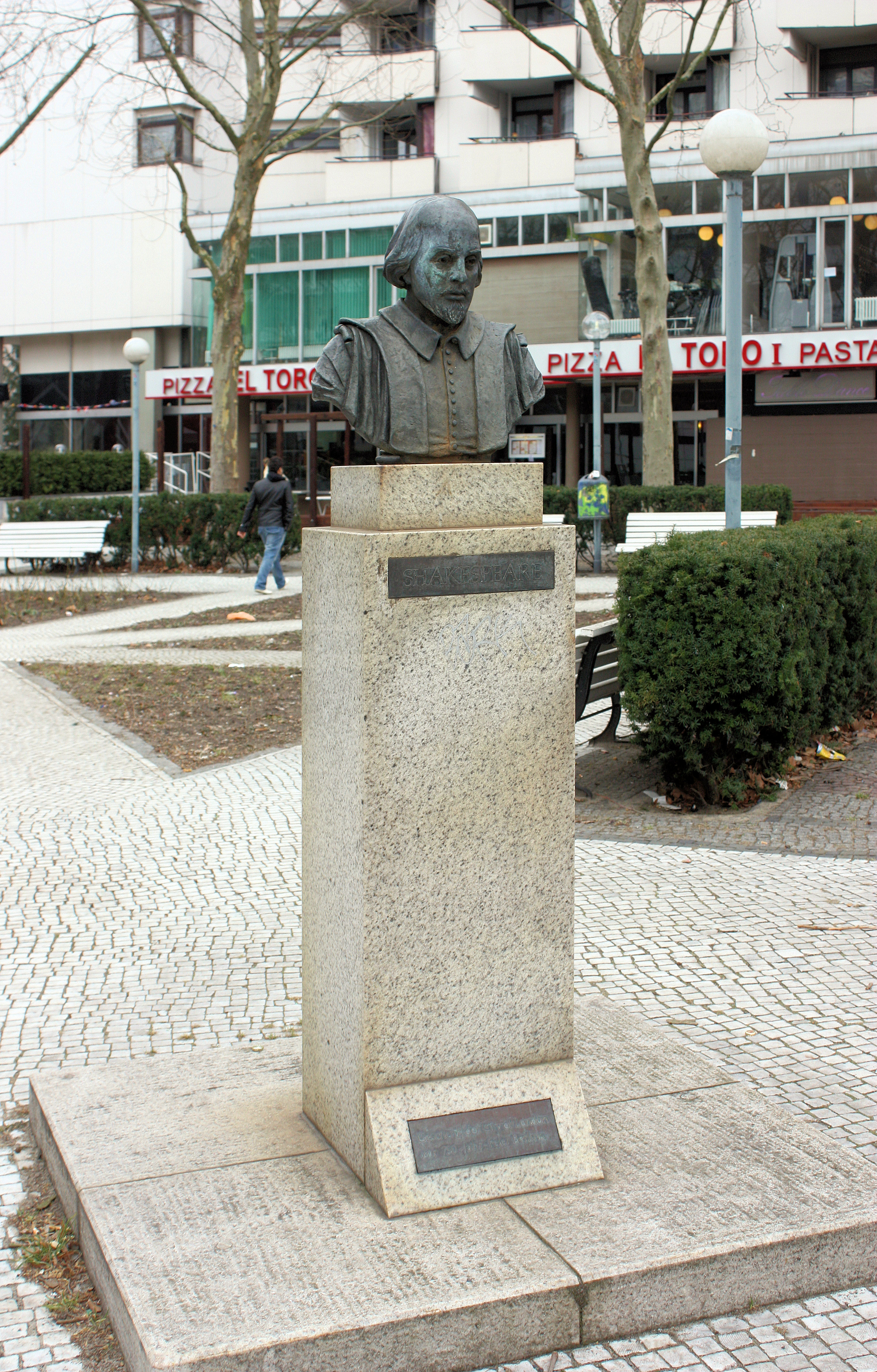
Bust of William Shakespeare in Charlottenburg, Berlin

Taylor was born in Pontypridd in Wales, and studied from 1947 to 1950 at the Sir John Cass College of Art in London, where teachers included Edward Bainbridge Copnall. She exhibited works at many galleries. She became a member of the Society of Portrait Sculptors in 1975, and an associate member of the Royal British Society of Sculptors in 1980.

== Works ==
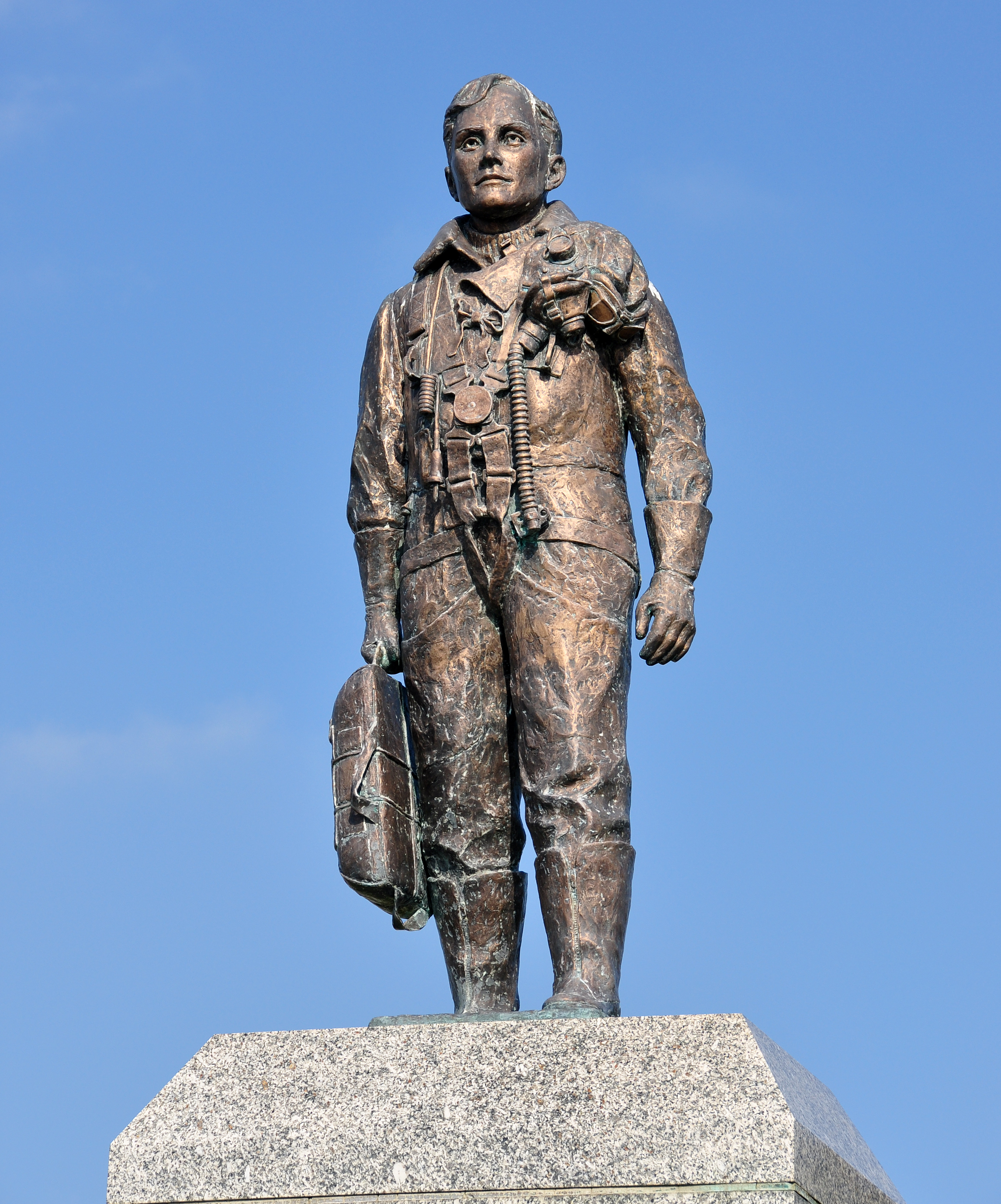
"The Unknown Airman", Plymouth Hoe

Taylor's works include the following:

- A bust of William Shakespeare, by the Deutsche Oper Berlin in Charlottenburg, Berlin, Germany, was presented by the City of London Corporation in 1987, on the occasion of the 750th anniversary of Berlin. Opernplatz ("Opera Place"), where the bust is sited, was renamed Shakespeareplatz. Another bust of Shakespeare was commissioned by the City of London Corporation for the restored Globe Theatre in London.
- A memorial to the RAF Commonwealth and Allied Air Forces who served in World War II was unveiled in 1989 on Plymouth Hoe in Devon. A bronze statue, "The Unknown Airman", is on a plinth of Cornish granite.
- A bronze statue of an airman, on a stone plinth, was unveiled in 1999 in Pier Gardens in Cleethorpes, Lincolnshire. It commemorates the members of RAF North Coates Strike Wing who served in World War II.
- Statues made in 2001 of Bob Dylan and Woody Guthrie, commissioned by Felix Dennis, are in the Garden of Heroes and Villains nea Dorsington, Warwickshire.
- "The Long March", in the Royal Air Force Museum London, was unveiled in 2003 by Prince Philip, Duke of Edinburgh. It is a memorial to RAF prisoners of war who died during a march westward in early 1945 from their prisoner-of-war camps, enforced in order to prevent their being liberated by advancing Russian forces. The bronze sculpture shows a PoW dragging a makeshift sled containing his possessions. The Royal Air Force Museum also contains bronze busts made by Taylor in 1978 of Sir Douglas Bader and Sir Arthur Harris.
- "Canvey Old and New", in Labworth Park, Canvey Island in Essex, was commissioned by Essex County Council and unveiled in 2005. A competition was organised by Essex Youth Service, and the winning design by Vicky Moore was sculpted by Taylor. A hand rising from the water holds a representation of Canvey Island.
