= Richard Taylor =

Richard Taylor may refer to:

== Entertainment ==
- Richard Taylor (cartoonist) (1902–1970), Canadian cartoonist, The New Yorker magazine
- Richard Norton-Taylor (born 1944), British editor, journalist, and playwright
- Richard Taylor (British writer) (born 1967), writer and broadcaster
- Richard Taylor (film director) (1933–2015), British documentary film director
- Richard John Taylor (born 1985), British film editor, writer, and director
- Richard Taylor (filmmaker) (born 1965), head of Wētā Workshop special effects studio
- Richard Taylor (Hollyoaks), a character in UK soap opera Hollyoaks
- Richard Taylor, former member of American rock band Gin Blossoms

== Military ==
- Richard Taylor (colonel) (1744–1829), father of U.S. president Zachary Taylor
- Richard Taylor (Confederate general) (1826–1879), son of U.S. president Zachary Taylor, Confederate general in the American Civil War
- Richard Taylor (Medal of Honor) (1834–1890), American Civil War soldier and Medal of Honor recipient
- Richard H. Taylor (1870–1956), American Medal of Honor recipient
- Richard Taylor (British Army officer) (1819–1904), British general
- Richard R. Taylor (1922–1978), American lieutenant general and Surgeon General of the United States Army

== Politics ==
- Richard Taylor (by 1517–73 or later), MP for Haverfordwest
- Richard Taylor (died 1641), English lawyer and politician who sat in the House of Commons from 1621 to 1629
- Richard Taylor (Royalist) (1620–1667), of Clapham, Bedfordshire
- Richard Taylor (died 1699), English MP for East Retford
- Richard Taylor (British politician) (1934–2024), British politician, Independent Member of Parliament
- Richard Molesworth Taylor (1835–1919), New Zealand politician
- Richard Taylor (Canadian politician) (1915–1991), Canadian politician in the Legislative Assembly of Ontario

== Religion ==
- Richard Taylor (missionary) (1805–1873), missionary in New Zealand
- Richard Vickerman Taylor (1830–1914), English priest and historian
- Richard S. Taylor (1912–2006), Nazarene theologian

== Science ==
- Richard Taylor (editor) (1781–1858), English naturalist and publisher of scientific journals
- Richard Cowling Taylor (1789–1851), English surveyor and geologist
- Richard Charles Taylor (born 1950), American philosopher
- Richard Clyde Taylor (1919–2003), American metaphysical philosopher and commercial beekeeper
- Richard E. Taylor (1929–2018), Canadian laureate of the 1990 Nobel Prize in Physics
- Richard Taylor (mathematician) (born 1962), involved in completing the proof of Fermat's last theorem

== Sports ==
- Dick Taylor (Australian rules footballer) (1901–1962), AFL player whose real name is Richard
- Richard Taylor (Australian footballer) (born 1973), former Hawthorn and West Coast Eagles player in the AFL
- Richard Taylor (footballer, born 1957), English footballer
- Richard Taylor (footballer, born 2000), English footballer
- Richard Taylor (American football) (born 1985), American football cornerback
- Richard Taylor (cross-country skier) (born 1938), American cross-country skier
- Richard Taylor (skater) (1981–2004), Welsh skater
- Richard Mansfield Taylor, real name of Jeff Richards, American minor league baseball player and actor

== Others ==
- Richard Taylor (pirate) (fl. 1721), pirate captain also known as John Taylor
- Richard Taylor (campaigner) (1948/49–2024), Nigerian civil servant and anti youth violence campaigner, father of Damilola Taylor

== See also ==
- Dick Taylor (disambiguation)
