= Walter Taylor (footballer) =

English footballer

Personal information
- Date of birth: 23 January 1902
- Place of birth: Manchester, England
- Date of death: 3 September 1955 (aged 53)
- Place of death: Maine Road football ground
- Position: Outside right

Senior career*
Years	Team	Apps	(Gls)
?–1921	New Mills		
1921–1922	Manchester United	1	(0)
- * Club domestic league appearances and goals

Walter Taylor (1902–1955) was an English footballer who played as an outside right. Born in Manchester, he played for New Mills and Manchester United, who signed him for a fee of £25 in December 1921. After just two weeks with the club, he made his Football League debut on 2 January 1922, in a 3–0 defeat away to Sheffield United. It was his only appearance for Manchester United, and he was released on a free transfer in April 1922.
