= George Taylor (Australian rules footballer) =

Australian rules footballer

Personal information
- Full name: George Taylor
- Born: 16 September 1876
- Died: 20 May 1953 (aged 76)
- Original team: Hawthorn (VJFA)

Playing career^{1}
Years	Club	Games (Goals)
1898	South Melbourne	1 (0)
- ^{1} Playing statistics correct to the end of 1898.

George Taylor (16 September 1876 – 20 May 1953) was an Australian rules footballer who played with South Melbourne in the Victorian Football League (VFL).
