= Andrew Taylor (water polo) =

Australian water polo player

Personal information
- Born: September 26, 1963 (age 61)

Sport
- Sport: Water polo

Andrew Taylor (born 26 September 1963) is an Australian former water polo player who competed in the 1988 Summer Olympics.
