= Stephen Taylor =

Stephen Taylor may refer to:

- Stephen James Taylor (born 1967), American film and TV composer
- Stephen Taylor, Baron Taylor of Harlow (1910–1988), British physician, civil servant, politician and educator
- Stephen Taylor (academic), lecturer in human resources at Manchester Metropolitan University Business School
- Stephen Taylor (economist) (born 1954), professor of finance at Lancaster University Management School
- Stephen Taylor (priest) (born 1955), senior priest in the Church of England
- Steve Taylor (Ronald Stephen Taylor), born 1957), American singer
- Steve Taylor (field hockey) (Stephen Donald Taylor, born 1960), British field hockey player
- Stephen Wallace Taylor (born 1965), historian

== See also ==
- Steven Taylor (disambiguation)
