= Patrick Taylor (politician) =

Australian politician (1862–1922)

Patrick Thomson Taylor (1862 – 17 November 1922) was a Scottish-born Australian politician.

He was born at Govan in Lanarkshire to grain merchant William Taylor and Jane Wilson. He attended Glasgow High School and was an accountant. He migrated to New South Wales around 1881, and on 29 November 1883 married Alice Maud Sayers, with whom he had four children. He ran a merchant firm in 1888 and from 1893 to 1898 was an alderman at Mosman, serving as mayor in 1896. From around 1897 he was the director of Sydney Ferries. He was politically active, being involved in the formation of the Nationalist Party. As such he was appointed to the New South Wales Legislative Council in 1917, serving until his death at Edgecliff in 1922.
