= Lucy D. Taylor =

American interior designer, teacher, writer

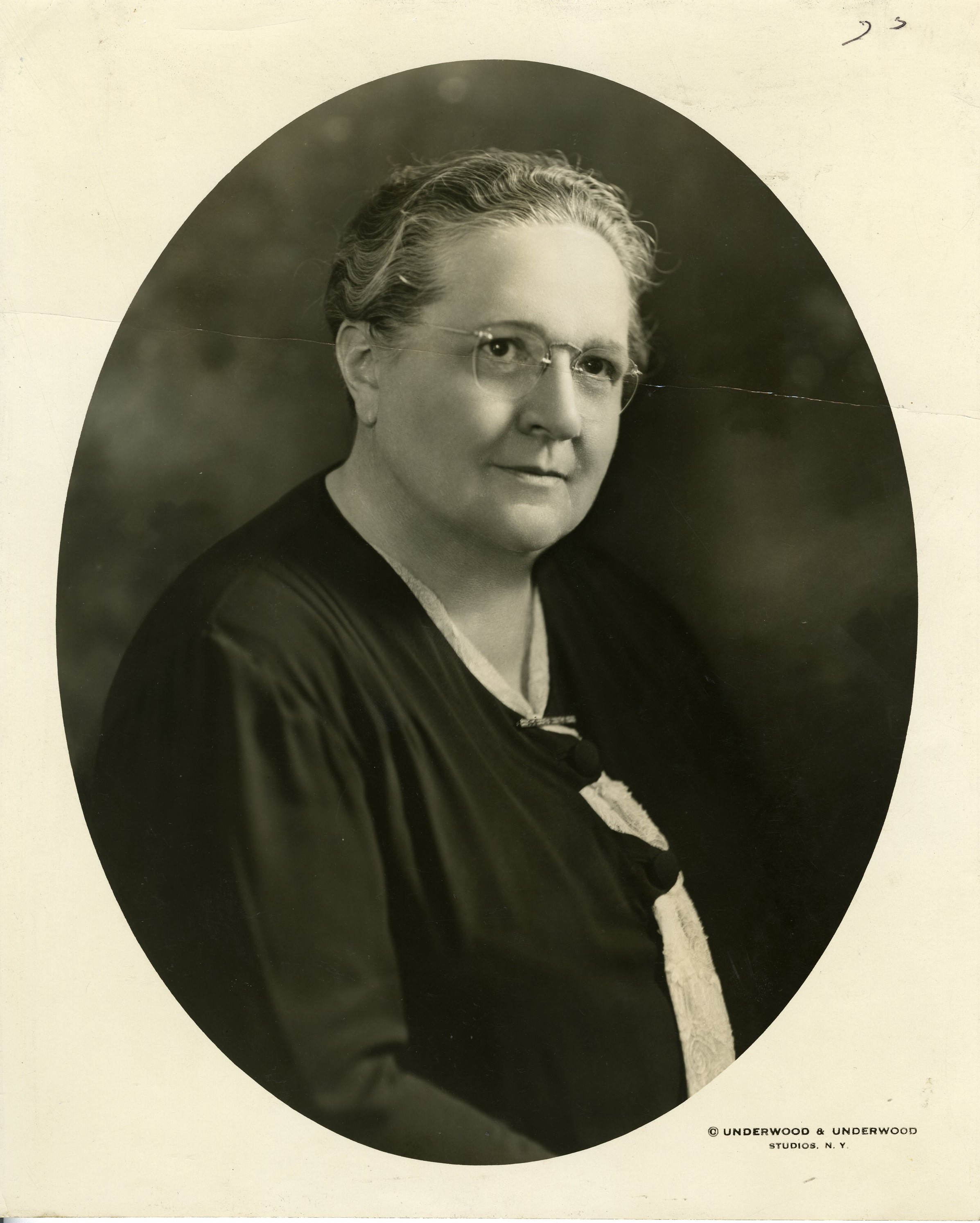
Lucy D. Taylor. Author, educator, and leading authority on interior decoration during the first half of the 20th century.

Lucy D. Taylor (died 1965) was an American author, educator, and authority on interior decoration during the first half of the 20th century. She was active in the field professionally, taking on leadership roles in organizations including the Decorators' Club, and served on President Hoover's housing committee as a home decoration expert. Throughout the 1920s and 1930s she was a contributing editor at House Beautiful, House & Garden, and Arts & Decoration.

== Career ==
Taylor was an authority on interior home design and lectured widely on the subject alongside an active teaching career. She served as Head of the Teachers’ Training Department and Instructor in Home Furnishing at the Massachusetts Normal Art School, Boston, and taught courses at Vassar College, Cornell University, Yale University and The Metropolitan Museum of Art.

Taylor was on the faculty of the New York School of Interior Design from 1928 to 1950. She was a distinguished instructor of Color and Room Composition, and had been a student herself of the American painter Albert Munsell, creator of the Munsell Color System.

She also served as the Vice Chairman and Research Executive of the Committee on Home Furnishings under President Herbert Hoover's Conference on Home Building Ownership.

== Articles and publications ==
Taylor was a frequent contributor to several magazine of home furnishings. From 1922 to 1935, Taylor was a contributing editor of House Beautiful, co-writing several articles with architect Verna Cook Salmonsky.

Taylor authored three books on interior design:

- Know Your Fabrics by Lucy D. Taylor. New York: John Wiley & Sons, 1951
- Your Home Beautiful: a manual of interior decoration. Suggestions to fit your means. New York: George H. Doran, 1925
- The Simple Art of Wall Decoration, published by Baeck Wallpaper Co., circa 1910.
