= Troy Taylor =

Troy Taylor may refer to:

- Troy Taylor (American football), American football coach
- Troy Taylor (Australian footballer), Australian rules footballer
- Troy Taylor (baseball), baseball player
- Troy Taylor (cricketer), Caymanian cricketer
- Troy Taylor (record producer), American singer, songwriter, and producer
