= Martin Taylor =

Martin Taylor may refer to:

- Martin Andrew Taylor, president of Vista Consulting Group and former Microsoft employee
- Sir Martin J. Taylor (born 1952), British mathematician and past vice-president of the Royal Society
- Martin Taylor (guitarist) (born 1956), British jazz guitarist
- Martin Taylor (businessman) (born 1952), former Barclays chief executive
- Martin Taylor (cricketer) (born 1957), English cricketer
- Martin Taylor (footballer, born 1966), English football goalkeeper
- Martin Taylor (footballer, born 1979), English football defender
- Martin Taylor (investor) (born 1969), British investor and hedge fund manager
- Marty Taylor, fictional character in Home Improvement
