= Geoffrey Taylor =

Geoffrey or Geoff Taylor may refer to:

- G. I. Taylor (Geoffrey Ingram Taylor, 1886–1975), British physicist and mathematician
- Geoffrey Taylor (rower) (1890–1915), Canadian rower
- Geoffrey Taylor (cricketer) (born 1949), New Zealand cricketer
- Geoffrey Taylor (sailor) (born 1950), Fijian Olympic sailor
- Geoffrey Phibbs (1900–1956), Irish poet, called himself Geoffrey Taylor
- Geoff Taylor (illustrator) (born 1946), British fantasy illustrator
- Geoff Taylor (singer) (born 1986), Filipino actor and singer
- Geoff Taylor (footballer) (1923–2007), English professional footballer

== See also ==
- Geoffrey Taylour, 4th Marquess of Headfort (1878–1943), British politician and Army officer
- Jeffrey Taylor (disambiguation)
