= Allen Taylor (scientist) =

American nutritionist

Allen Taylor is an American scientist and Professor of Nutrition, Development, Molecular and Chemical Biology, and Ophthalmology at Tufts University. He focuses on the intersection of proteostasis, nutrition, and aging, specifically age related eye diseases such as age-related macular degeneration (AMD) and cataracts. He initiated his work asking if calorie restricted diets, which are known to prolong life and improve health, could also be used to delay cataracts. His epidemiologic and laboratory animal work indicates that there is an association between consuming higher glycemic index (GI) diets, typical of Western diet patterns, and increased risk for AMD. Glycemic index (GI) indicates how quickly blood glucose is raised following the consumption of a carbohydrate containing food. This property has been associated with many disorders such as diabetes, cardiovascular disease, atherosclerosis, and AMD. This effect is independent of intake of antioxidants, zinc, and omega-3 fatty acids (including docosahexaenoic acid (DHA) and eicosapentaenoic acid (EPA)) indicating that AMD is largely driven by dietary GI. Attributable risk calculations suggest that by lowering the glycemic index only by 5 points would save >100,000 people from AMD in 5 years. This change in glycemic index can be achieved by exchanging the equivalent of 5 pieces of white break for 5 slices of whole grain bread daily. This has been corroborated in multiple laboratory animal models in which his group revealed that consuming lower glycemic index diets preserves retinal integrity upon aging. Mechanistic experiments demonstrated that readily digested dietary carbohydrates result in loss of photoreceptors, basal infoldings, and accumulation of lipid products, lipofuscin, and basal deposits. Limiting antioxidant potential accelerates this damage, but enhancing protection against sugar breakdown products such as methylglyoxal, or enhancing proteolytic potential, delays the sugar associated damage. This can be accomplished by over-expressing the glyoxalase, or p62, or by used of drugs to limit plasma glucose. His group is executing the GLOVE (Glucose Lowering for Vision Extension) clinical studies to determine if patients with earlier AMD will be willing to adhere to diets that may slow the progression or limit risk for AMD. His group has also been involved in the analysis of dietary patterns and their association with risk for age-related diseases. Using data from the American AREDS cohort, they found that a higher Oriental pattern score was strongly associated with 25% lower odds for early AMD and over 60% lower odds for advanced AMD. In comparison, there is an almost 60% increase of early AMD odds and almost 3-fold increase of advanced AMD odds for eyes among consumers of diets with the highest western pattern scores.

Proteostasis experiments identified p62 or the sequestome as a glycation-susceptible link between the ubiquitin proteolytic pathways and lysosomal proteolytic pathways. They recently found that a ubiquitin ligase known as SMURF1 works with the ubiquitin conjugating enzyme UbcH7 to stabilize p27, a protein that negatively regulates G1 to S phase of the cell cycle and is involved in cancer. His prior work demonstrated that deaminated proteins and oxidized proteins are substrates for the ubiquitin proteolytic pathway and that activity of this pathway is controlled by redox status. Redox status, or oxidative stress, can be assessed using the ratio of glutathione disulfide dimer to glutathione. Taylor has expanded on this research by demonstrating that unbalanced redox status is an underlying mechanism behind lens opacities and cataracts, even in early life.

After his experience as a Senior Fulbright Scholar in Israel, Dr. Taylor founded and codirects the Scientific Training Encouraging Peace- Graduate Training Program, which pairs Israeli and Palestinian (from West Bank and Gaza) advanced level health science students in the same graduate training program, often in the same laboratory. The STEP program aims to foster enduring, cooperative relationships that advance the careers of the Fellows, enrich their academic departments and universities, start new industries in the communities they serve, and provide improved health care. STEP alumni have become professors, government ministry officers, and other influential professionals in both Palestine and Israel; thus STEP educates societal influencers who understand the importance of cooperative and productive relations between Israelis and Palestinians.

== Education ==
Taylor earned his B.S. in Chemistry from City College of New York, Ph.D. in Organic Chemistry from Rutgers University, and completed his postdoctoral work at the University of California, Berkeley.

== Positions and awards ==
In addition to his work at the Friedman School of Nutrition Science and Policy at Tufts University and with STEP-GTP, Dr. Taylor has been the Morris-Belken visiting professor at the Weizmann Institute of Science, and a Senior Fulbright Scholar. He has been awarded the Osborne and Mendel Award for Excellence in Nutrition Research, the Denham Harman Award for Excellence in Aging Research, a Guggenheim Grant, and the Pfizer Consumer Healthcare Nutritional Sciences Award. Recent awards include the City College Townsend Harris Humanitarian medal. Taylor was honored as a fellow in the Association for Research in Vision and Ophthalmology, the American Association for Advancement of Science and American Society for Nutrition, and the American Society for Nutrition.
