= Valerie Taylor =

Valerie Taylor may refer to:

- Valerie Taylor (actress) (1902–1988), English actress
- Valerie Taylor (novelist) (1913–1997), American author of books published in the Lesbian pulp fiction genre
- Valerie Taylor (diver) (born 1935), Australian underwater diver and shark expert
- Valerie Ann Taylor (born 1944), British-born Bangladeshi philanthropist, founder of the Center for the Rehabilitation of the Paralyzed (CRP)
- Valerie Taylor (computer scientist) (born 1963), African American computer scientist
