= Stephen Taylor (academic) =

Stephen Taylor is a senior lecturer in human resource management at the University of Exeter Business School. He is a chief examiner for the Chartered Institute of Personnel and Development (CIPD), being responsible for the employment law, managing in a strategic context and leading, managing & developing people papers. He formerly taught at Manchester Metropolitan University Business School and at Manchester Business School.

Taylor is the author of Resourcing and Talent Management (CIPD, Fifth Edition) and Contemporary Issues in HRM, as well as the co-author of several books including five editions of People Resourcing, three editions of Employment Law: An Introduction (with Astra Emir), The Employee Retention Handbook and six editions of Human Resource Management (with Derek Torrington, Laura Hall and Carol Atkinson).

== Bibliography ==
- Recruiting, and Retaining Graduate Talent, co-written with Shirley Jenner, Financial Times, Prentice Hall (2000) ISBN 0-273-64457-2
- Employee Retention Handbook (Developing Practice), CIPD (2002) ISBN 0-85292-963-3
- Human Resource Management, co-written with Carol Atkinson, Laura Hall, and Derek Torrington. FT Prentice Hall; 8th edition (2011) ISBN 0-273-71075-3
- Resourcing and Talent Management, CIPD; 5th edition (2011) ISBN 1-84398-077-0
- Employment Law: An Introduction, co-written with Astra Emir Oxford University Press, Third Edition (2012) ISBN 0-19-928676-0
- Contemporary Issues in Human Resource Management, CIPD (2011) ISBN 1-84398-219-6
