= Andrew Taylor (cricketer) =

English cricketer

Personal information
- Full name: Andrew Taylor
- Born: 20 April 1838; Camberwell, Surrey, England
- Died: 5 April 1901 (aged 62); Aston, Warwickshire, England
- Batting: Right-handed
- Bowling: Right-arm roundarm medium

Domestic team information
- Years: Team
- 1865: Surrey

Career statistics
Competition	First-class
Matches	1
Runs scored	1
Batting average	1.00
100s/50s	–/–
Top score	1
Balls bowled	40
Wickets	1
Bowling average	13.00
5 wickets in innings	–
10 wickets in match	–
Best bowling	1/13
Catches/stumpings	–/–
- Source: Cricinfo, 23 August 2012

Andrew Taylor (20 April 1838 – 5 April 1901) was an English cricketer. Taylor was a right-handed batsman who bowled right-arm roundarm medium. He was born at Camberwell, Surrey.

Taylor made a single first-class appearance for Surrey against the South in 1865 at The Oval. Surrey won the toss and elected to field first, with the South then making 196 all out, with Taylor taking the wicket of opening batsman Charles Payne to finish the innings with figures of 1/13 from ten overs. In their first-innings, Surrey were dismissed for 135, with Taylor being dismissed for a single run by George Bennett. The South responded in their second-innings by making 165 all out, setting Surrey a target of 227 for victory. Surrey reached 37/2 in their second-innings chase, at which point the match was declared a draw. This was his only major appearance for Surrey.

He died at Aston, Warwickshire, on 5 April 1901.
