= Margarita Kearney Taylor =

English businesswoman (1890–1982)

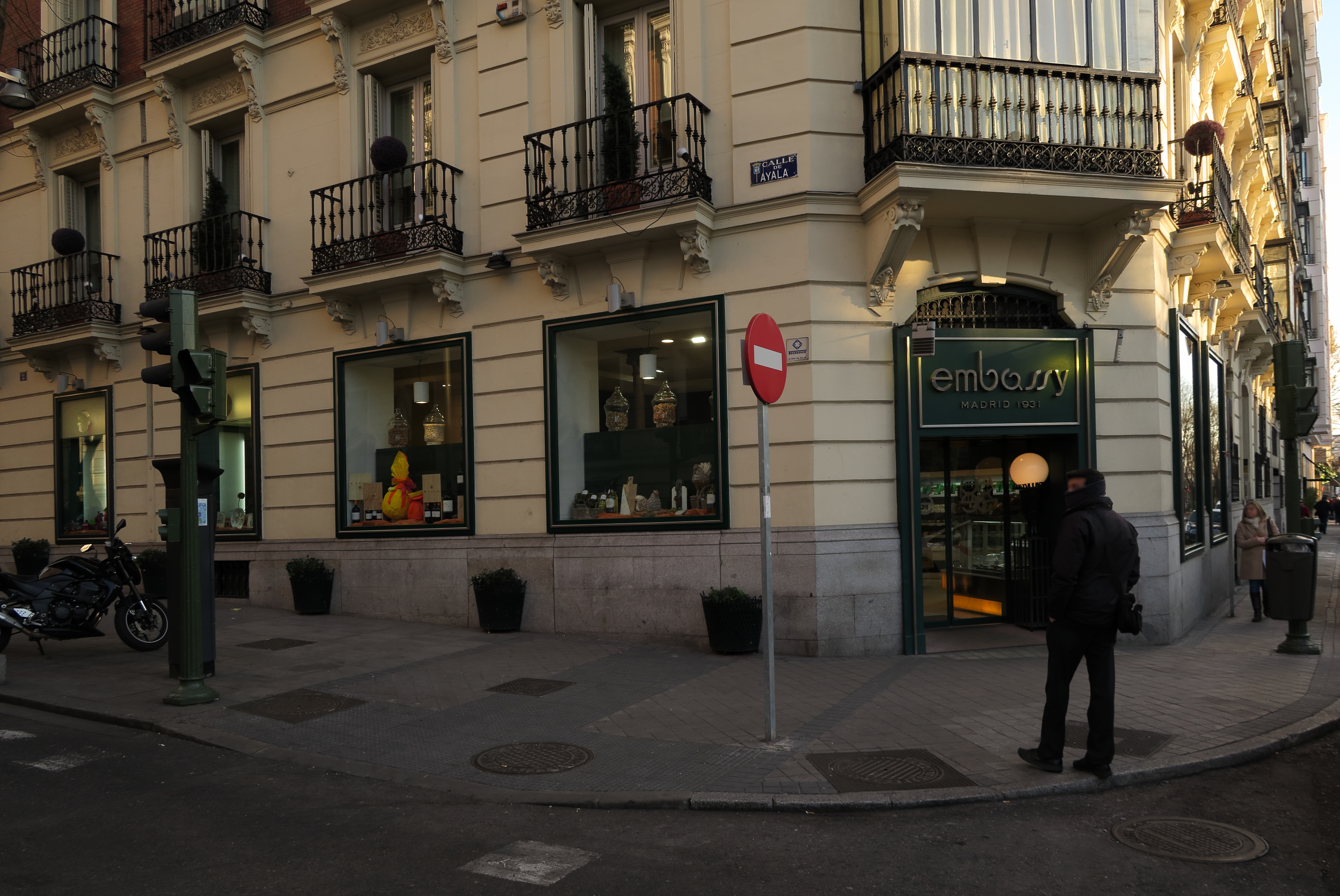
Embassy café in Madrid

Margarita Kearney Taylor (8 January 1890 in Southampton – 2 December 1982 in Madrid) was a British woman living in Spain who founded and ran the Embassy tea room in Madrid, in its original location on Castellana Street.

== Biography ==
She was born in Southampton, the daughter of Ellen Taylor and an unknown father (as was her mother). She moved around England in her youth, working in 1920 in Bournemouth.

In the 1920s, she moved to Paris, where her daughter Consuelo was born from a relationship with a Spanish diplomat. After arranging for his daughter to take her father's surname, in 1931 they moved to Madrid, where after a few years working at the General Motors factory, she and two other partners opened the Embassy café, in the style of the Parisian tea rooms and designed to attract the wealthy foreign clientele of the embassy district. After the Second World War, during which she lived temporarily in his country, she returned to Spain and reopened the Embassy.

In 1975, Margarita Kearney Taylor transferred the business, although she remained a shareholder and the driving force behind the establishment. She died on 2 December 1982, and was buried in the British Cemetery in Madrid.

After her death, documentation began to emerge about her activities during the Spanish postwar period and the development of the Second World War, which linked her café to various incidents related to Nazism and persecuted Jews, and other activities of the British secret services.
