= Mike Taylor =

Mike Taylor may refer to:

== Music ==
- Mike Taylor (British musician) (1938–1969), British jazz pianist and songwriter
- Mike Taylor (guitarist) (1948–2010), American songwriter and archaeologist
- Mike "Beard Guy" Taylor (died 2018), member of Walk off the Earth

== Sports ==
- Mike Taylor (racing driver) (1934–2017), Formula One driver
- Mike Taylor (cricketer, born 1942), English cricketer
- Mike Taylor (cricketer, born 1944), English cricketer
- Mike Taylor (offensive tackle) (1945–2015), American football offensive tackle
- Mike Taylor (linebacker, born 1949), American football linebacker
- Mike Taylor (linebacker, born 1989), Wisconsin Badgers linebacker
- Mike Taylor (basketball coach) (born 1972), American basketball coach
- Mike Taylor (basketball player) (born 1986), American basketball guard
- Mike Taylor (swimmer) (born 1964), British multiple sclerosis activist

== Other ==
- Mike Taylor (Montana politician) (born 1941), American politician
- Mike Taylor (public servant) (1948–2023), Australian public servant
- Mike P. Taylor (born 1968), British paleontologist

== See also ==
- Michael Taylor (disambiguation)
- Maik Taylor (born 1971), Northern Irish football goalkeeper
