= George Rogers Taylor =

American historian

George Rogers Taylor (1895 – April 11, 1983) was an American economic historian, best known for his 1951 work The Transportation Revolution, 1815–1860.

== Biography ==
Taylor was born in Beaver Dam, Wisconsin. He was the son of Webb Vine Taylor and Grace Rogers. He received his undergraduate and doctoral degrees from the University of Chicago. He graduated in 1914 from Wayland Academy at Beaver Dam and from what was then Oshkosh Normal School in 1916. He earned his way through college by waiting on tables, mowing lawns and tending furnaces. After his graduation from Oshkosh Normal School, he served a year as principal of a small elementary school at Waukesha and then enlisted for two years in the U.S. Navy during World War I. He taught for two years at Wayland Academy and then received his bachelor's degree 1921 and his doctorate in 1929, both from the University of Chicago.

He was a member of the faculty at Amherst College from 1924 to 1965 where he helped to develop the college's American Studies Program. From 1948 to 1968, he was the general editor of the program's book series called “Problems in American Civilization." The books were used nationally in colleges and secondary schools for many years. Taylor was the special editor of the series volumes on these subjects: the Turner thesis describing the role of the frontier in American history; “Jackson vs Biddle” the struggle over the Second Bank of the United States; “Hamilton and the National Debt"; and “The Great Tariff Debate 1820 to 1830.” His 1951 book The Transportation Revolution, 1815–1860 remains a key text in the analysis of the development of capitalism in the early republic..

Taylor also served as the editor of the Journal of Economic History from 1955 to 1960. He was president of the American Studies Association from 1956 to 1958, chairman of the Council on Research in Economic History from 1958 to 1962, and president of the Economic History Association from 1962 to 1964. During World War I Taylor served in the US Navy's aviation operations. He conducted research for the International Committee on Pride History in 1920 and 1931 and he was a senior agricultural economist for the US Department of Agriculture in 1938. He later held several positions in the Office of Price Administration and he served on the War Production Board from 1941 to 1946.

The George Rogers Taylor Prize is awarded annually "to the (Amherst) student who, in the opinion of the American Studies Department, shows the most promise for creative and scholarly work in American studies."

== Selected works ==
- George Rogers Taylor, Agrarian discontent in the Mississippi valley preceding the war of 1812 (1931)
- Louis M. Hacker, Rudolf Modley and George Rogers Taylor. The United States: a graphic history,New York, Modern age books, inc, 1938.
- George Rogers Taylor. Jackson versus Biddle; the struggle over the second Bank of the United States (1949)
- George Rogers Taylor, The transportation revolution, 1815–1860 (1951)
- George Rogers Taylor, The Turner thesis concerning the role of the frontier in American history (1949)
- George Rogers Taylor, The American railroad network, 1861–1890 (1956)
