= George Taylor (gardener) =

Scottish gardener (1803-1891)

- Born: February 12, 1803; Scottish Borders, Scotland
- Died: August 21, 1891 (aged 88); Kalamazoo, Michigan, United States
- Occupation: Horticulturist

George Taylor (February 12, 1803 − August 21, 1891) was a nurseryman from Scotland who emigrated to Kalamazoo, Michigan in 1855. There, he became known as George "Celery" Taylor because he introduced commercial celery growing to the United States.

== Early life ==
George Taylor was born in the Scottish Borders on 12 February 1803. His parents were Andrew Taylor, a shepherd, and Violet Stevenson. As a child, Taylor had to watch over the sheep, often snaring rabbits and hares illegally to sell for one shilling and sixpence each, a day's wages then. His parents were literate; though, he could already read the Bible when he started school aged seven.

== Working life ==
Even though he only had a few years of schooling, he was an educated man with a great love of books. He used to walk the fifty miles to Edinburgh, which took him fourteen hours, to spend his money on books rather than pay the coach fare.

He learned his trade as a market gardener and in 1846 became manager of a plant nursery in Kelso. He worked there successfully for nine years.

== Religion and temperance ==
He was a deeply religious man at a time when there was much upheaval in the Church of Scotland. He followed Thomas Chalmers at the time of the Disruption of 1843 to form the Free Church of Scotland. After seeing families destroyed by drink, he became involved in the Temperance movement which was growing in Britain at that time. He became vice-president of the Temperance Society in Kelso. His faith also made him speak up against slavery.

== United States ==
In 1855, aged 53, he took his family to the United States and settled in Kalamazoo, Michigan, where his brothers were already living. There, he started a gardening business and had many plants and trees shipped from Scotland. It was there that he introduced commercial celery growing to the United States, an achievement remembered on a plaque in Kalamazoo. He gave several addresses to the Horticultural Society of Michigan on hedging and forestry, stressing the need for planting for the future.

== Travel ==
He was a well-travelled man who journeyed through Scotland, England, Ireland and the United States by rail. He made his first train journey in 1843 to Ayrshire then to the Trossachs where he met and travelled with Newman Hall (Christopher Newman Hall, known as the Dissenter’s Bishop, who was a notable English Nonconformist). Taylor’s first sea voyage was to the United States in 1855. In spite of the first sailing ship nearly sinking off Ireland, he returned to Scotland in 1862 and again in 1874, crossing the Atlantic five times in all. On his train travels he visited the Great Exhibition in London in 1851, the Niagara Falls, Washington and saw the ruins of Chicago a few days after the Great Fire in 1871.

== Family ==
George Taylor had four wives and six children. Three others died at birth. He married:

1. Helen Robson in 1837, died in childbirth in 1839.
2. Jane Dodds in 1842, mother of his six surviving children, died c.1857.
3. Jane Whellans in 1863, died in childbirth in the same year.
4. Susan Carter in 1870, died in 1889.

His children were Isabella, Andrew who drowned aged 19, James, Violet, George and John.

George Taylor died in Kalamazoo on 21 August 1891.

== Sources ==
- Jeary, Margaret; Mulhern, Mark (2009). From Kelso to Kalamazoo: The Life and Times of George Taylor, 1803-1891. European Ethnological Research Centre and National Museums Scotland Enterprises. ISBN 978-1-905267-27-9.
- American gardening (v. 11 ed.). 1890.
- Armour Institute of Technology (1908). "Technical world magazine". 10. Technical World Co.
