= Derek Taylor (disambiguation) =

Derek Taylor (1932–1997) was a British journalist and press officer for The Beatles.

Derek Taylor may also refer to:

- Derek Taylor (cricketer) (born 1942), former English cricketer
- Derek Taylor (EastEnders)
- Derek Hugh Taylor (born 1951), Chief Minister of the Turks and Caicos Islands, 1995–2003

== Fictional characters ==
- Derek Taylor, a fictional character in the American TV sitcom Silver Spoons
