= George Taylor (footballer, born 1948) =

Scottish footballer

Personal information
- Full name: George Jack Taylor
- Date of birth: 23 October 1948
- Place of birth: Dundee, Scotland
- Date of death: 22 February 2017 (aged 68)
- Place of death: Dundee, Scotland
- Position: Winger

Senior career*
Years	Team	Apps	(Gls)
1965–1968	Grimsby Town	1	(0)
- * Club domestic league appearances and goals

George Jack Taylor (23 October 1948 – 22 February 2017) was a Scottish professional footballer who played as a winger.
