= George Taylor (footballer, born 1901) =

English footballer

Personal information
- Full name: George Taylor
- Date of birth: 23 January 1901
- Place of birth: Failsworth, England
- Position: Centre forward

Senior career*
Years	Team	Apps	(Gls)
1922–1923	Ferranti		
1923–1924	Hurst		
1924–1929	Oldham Athletic	71	(22)
1929–1930	Macclesfield		
1930–1931	Sandbach Ramblers		
1931–1932	Hurst		
1933–1934	Newport County	11	(6)
1934	Hurst		
Total		82	(28)
- * Club domestic league appearances and goals

George Taylor (born 23 January 1901) was an English footballer who played in the Football League for Newport County and Oldham Athletic.
