= Christopher Taylor (Australian footballer) =

Australian rules footballer

Personal information
- Full name: Christopher Taylor
- Born: 31 May 1966 (age 60)
- Original team: Banyule
- Height: 188 cm (6 ft 2 in)
- Weight: 78 kg (172 lb)

Playing career^{1}
Years	Club	Games (Goals)
1987	Fitzroy	1 (0)
- ^{1} Playing statistics correct to the end of 1987.

Christopher Taylor (born 31 May 1966) is a former Australian rules footballer who played for the Fitzroy Football Club in the Victorian Football League (VFL). He played one game in the 1987 season, but was delisted at the end of the season.

== Game ==
Taylor played against Essendon in Round 20 of the 1987 season, but was dropped from the squad in the next game.
