= Chris Taylor =

Chris Taylor may refer to:

== Music ==
- Chris Taylor (Grizzly Bear musician) (born 1981), American musician and producer with the band Grizzly Bear
- Chris Taylor (music producer) (born 1962), American pioneering West Coast DJ, a/k/a "The Glove"
- Chris Taylor, singer in American musical group Love Coma

== Sports ==
- Chris Taylor (baseball) (born 1990), American baseball player
- Chris Taylor (cricketer, born 1976), English cricketer, who has played for Gloucestershire
- Chris Taylor (cricketer, born 1981), English cricketer, who has played for Yorkshire and Derbyshire
- Chris Taylor (footballer, born 1899) (1899–1972), English football player for Manchester United
- Chris Taylor (footballer, born 1985), English football player for Swindon Town
- Chris Taylor (footballer, born 1986), English football coach for FC United of Manchester
- Chris Taylor (ice hockey) (born 1972), Canadian NHL player for the Buffalo Sabres
- Chris Taylor (rowing) (born 1966), Canadian Olympic rower
- Chris Taylor (running back) (born 1983), American football player in the NFL, primarily for the Houston Texans
- Chris Taylor (wide receiver) (born 1979), American football player
- Chris Taylor (wrestler) (1950–1979), American freestyle wrestler

== Other ==
- Chris Taylor, character played by Charlie Sheen in the movie Platoon
- Chris Taylor (businessman), Canadian owner of TMKO Lawyers & Last Gang Recordsy
- Chris J. Taylor, (born 1945), physicist
- Chris Taylor (comedian) (born 1974), known for The Chaser's War on Everything, CNNNN, and Triple J
- Chris Taylor (engineer) (born 1943), engineer and Vice-Chancellor of the University of Bradford
- Chris Taylor (video game designer), known for Total Annihilation and Dungeon Siege
- Chris Taylor (judge) (born 1968), American judge from Wisconsin
- Chris Taylor (Vermont politician)
- Chris Taylor (TV personality), English television personality

== See also ==
- Christopher Taylor (disambiguation)
- Christian Taylor (disambiguation)
