= Leo Taylor =

Leo Taylor may refer to:

- Leo Taylor (baseball) (1901–1982), American Major League Baseball player
- Leo Taylor (Canadian football) (1948–2017), Canadian football player
- Leo Hale Taylor (1889–1967), Roman Catholic archbishop of Lagos
- Leo Taylor (EastEnders), fictional character
- Leo Taylor, drummer for the Invisible
- Leo Taylor, drummer for Area 11
