= George Taylor (photographer) =

Canadian landscape photographer (1838–1913)

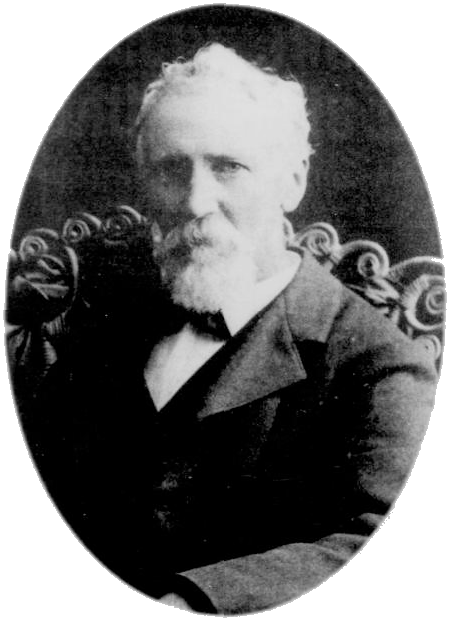
- Born: September 6, 1838; Fredericton, Colony of New Brunswick
- Died: April 5, 1913 (aged 74); Fredericton, New Brunswick, Canada
- Years active: 1856–1906
- Known for: Photography and painting (Note: Taylor turned to painting after retiring from photography, which he is much better known for.)
- Spouses: Sarah George (m. 1860; died 1866); Mary Avery (m. 1868; died 1905)
- Children: 6

George Thomas Taylor (September 6, 1838 – April 5, 1913) was a Canadian photographer and painter whose work depicts the landscapes and everyday life of nineteenth-century New Brunswick. He is regarded as a pioneering nature photographer in Canada.

Taylor was born in Fredericton, New Brunswick. He developed an interest in photography and in 1856, he began his career, during which he documented and photographed provincial locations, including the Tobique Valley. In the early 20th century, when photography was becoming more accessible, Taylor retired and took up landscape painting, which he continued until his death in 1913. Taylor often used his own photographs as references. As of 2023, hundreds of Taylor's images are preserved and have been exhibited at the Provincial Archives of New Brunswick.

== Early life and career ==
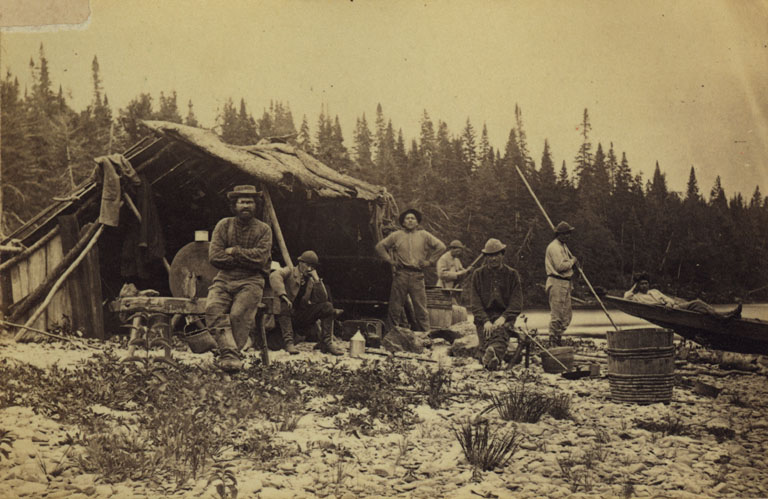
Party of lumbermen in Victoria County, c. 1862

George Thomas Taylor was born on September 6, 1838, in Fredericton, a British garrison town in the Colony of New Brunswick. His father William P. Taylor had migrated from London, England, and worked as a carpenter. George Taylor's mother was Frances (Morrison) Taylor; George was the middle child of five siblings, and the family lived in a house William built in 1846. George developed an interest in photography through borrowing magazines from soldiers at the local garrison, which led him to pursue a self-study of photography, particularly its scientific concepts. During his teenage years, Taylor started creating daguerreotypes, and would improve on his craft throughout the following years while working in the family carpentry business. He had an additional early experience in painting, which he would primarily practice during his later years.

In 1856, Taylor, guided by a local portrait photographer, began working as a photographer. The same year, he built his first camera and began producing daguerreotypes. Taylor borrowed and read English periodicals from Garrison officers to deepen his understanding of photography. With the help of his father, Taylor would build basic cameras himself by 1960, while accruing knowledge of the collodion process. He later established his first studio at the intersection between Queen and Carleton Streets, Fredericton.

== Photographic career ==
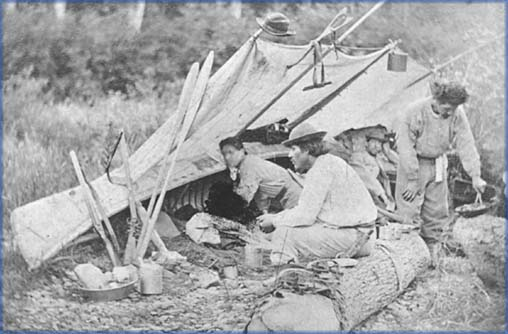
A Maliseet camp in Tobique, 1865

Taylor expanded his photographic work beyond his studio in Fredericton. In the early 1860s, he developed a friendship with Arthur Hamilton Gordon, the last Lieutenant Governor of New Brunswick before the colony's Confederation. In 1863, Gordon commissioned Taylor to travel throughout the province and document places, and with a reference letter from the governor, Taylor embarked on an expedition to the Tobique River, becoming one of the first photographers to explore it. During this period, his photography skills would impress Fredericton's regiment officers, who would also commission him. When the forces relocated to Halifax, Nova Scotia, Taylor was encouraged to join them.

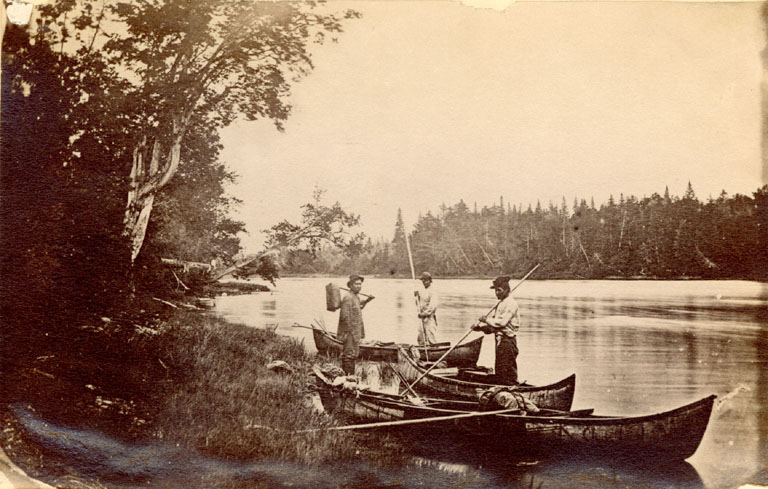
Wolastoqey guides along the Tobique River, 1862

During his expeditions, Taylor formed friendships with Maliseet peoples, including a notable individual known as Gave Acquin, with whom he frequently collaborated while exploring the province. According to an exhibit chairwoman, Taylor could fluently speak the Maliseet language. He traversed the forests and river valleys of New Brunswick by canoe, and was aided by his brother John as well as First Nations guides, who referred to him as "Garge". While on his expeditions, Taylor used a portable darkroom to process photographs, and took with him all of his equipment, including this portable darkroom, camera, chemicals and negatives. Taylor revisited the Tobique River in the following decades.

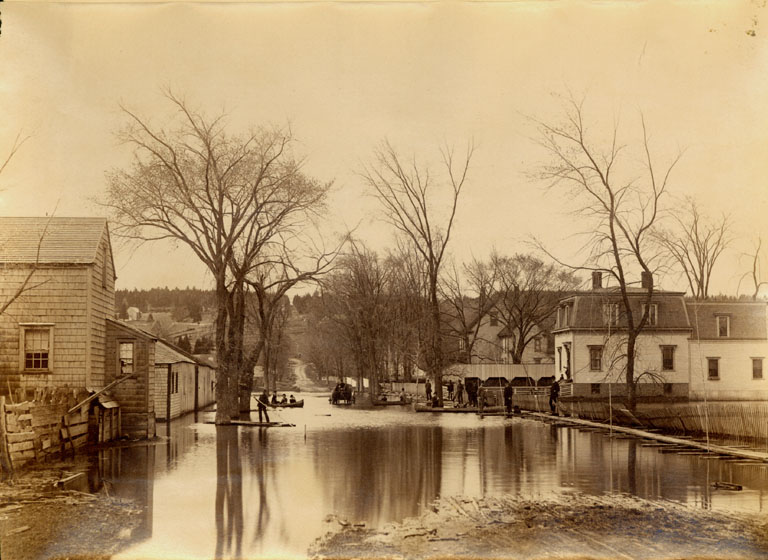
Canoeing in Fredericton during spring freshet, 1887

Taylor, who continued to live in Fredericton after 1896, earned an income from making studio portraits of notable individuals, though his main interest was landscape and scenery photography. His collection mostly consisted of images of New Brunswick, including rivers, towns, mills, lumber camps, hunters, fishermen, and indigenous guides.

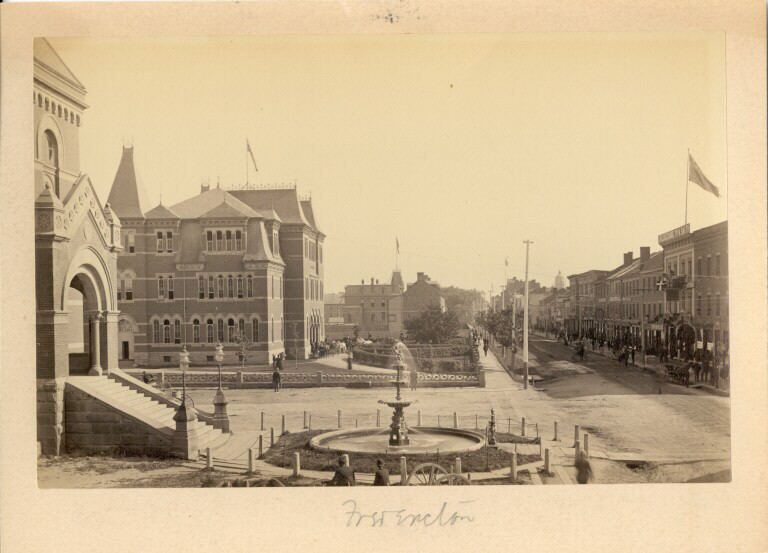
Fredericton, New Brunswick, 1889

In 1868, examples of Taylor's work were featured in the inaugural edition of Canadian Illustrated News, a national news magazine. Government and local businesses often commissioned Taylor to photograph unexplored regions of New Brunswick. For example, the New Brunswick Railway Company commissioned him to photograph sites along the route to Edmunston before tracks were laid west of Fredericton. During his career, Taylor expanded his house to add a portrait studio.

During the 1870s, Taylor may have faced financial difficulties: this is indicated by his advertisements for the sale of his negatives. During his career, Taylor used several photographic processes, including daguerreotypes, wet plates, and dry plates. He kept his knowledge updated through publications like The Philadelphia Photographer and experimented with stereoscopic and conventional cameras. Occasionally, he experimented with trick photography. In 1873, Taylor described himself as a "photographic artist", according to a carte de visite he issued. In 1879, in Saint John, Taylor attended a presentation by geologist Edward Jack, who featured Taylor's photographs.

== Later career ==
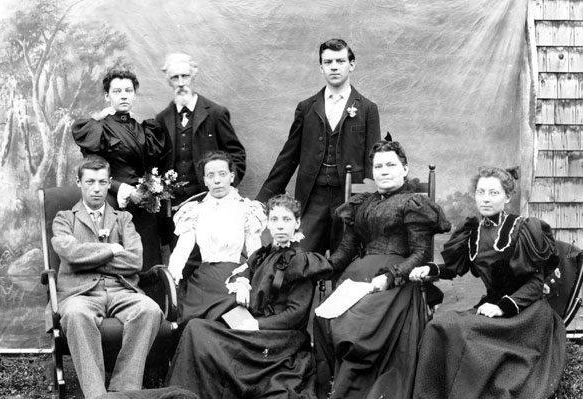
George Taylor in an undated family photograph. Taylor is the second person in the standing row.

Taylor's final photographic expedition occurred in 1906, for which he returned to the Tobique River. Following this expedition, Taylor shifted his focus from photography to oil and watercolour painting, despite his work in those media being less popular that his photographic work.

Taylor went onto lead a quiet life; he retired from photography due to the growing popularity of amateur photography brought about by the increased accessibility of cameras, which resulted in reduced demand for Taylor's photography. As he moved to painting, Taylor frequently used his photographs as references, often creating scenes that were inspired by New Brunswick forests. The Government of New Brunswick collected Taylor's his paintings, including four that are displayed at Old Government House in Fredericton.

== Personal life and death ==
In 1860, Taylor was married to his first wife Sarah George, who died in 1866. In 1868, he married Mary Avery and had six children with her. They remained married until Avery's death on February 14, 1905, at the age of 66.

On April 5, 1913, at the age of 74, Taylor died in his Fredericton residence. His funeral took place three days later at his home, and he was buried in Fredericton Rural Cemetery. Taylor was survived by two siblings and all of his children. The house where he spent most of his life, known as the William Taylor House, is now a historical landmark that displays a plaque in his memory.

== Legacy ==
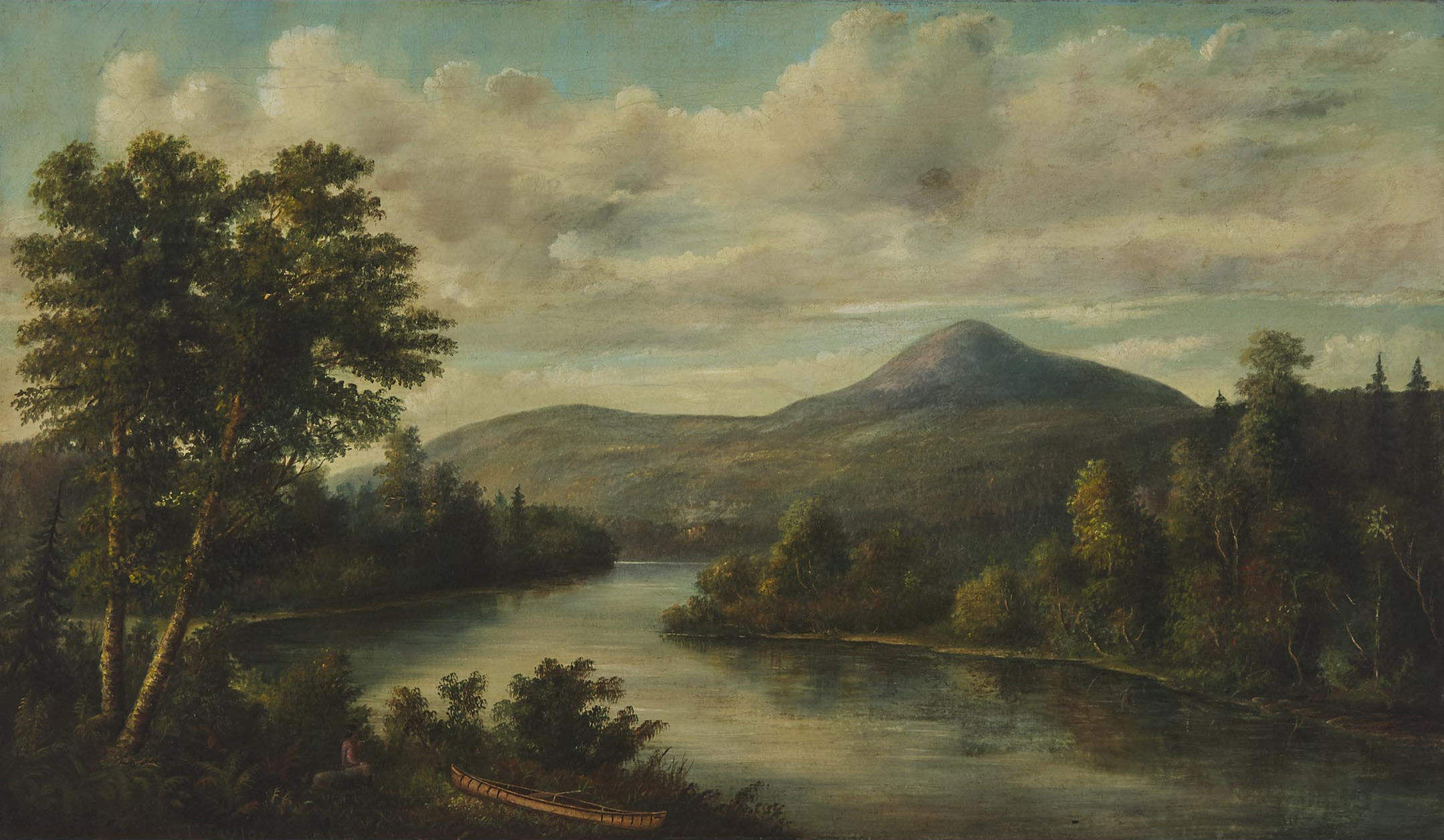
Landscape With Man Resting Ashore (1889)

Although Taylor is credited for being not only one of New Brunswick's first photographers, but also as a pioneering Canadian nature photographer, he remains relatively unknown beyond the province. Taylor's extensive body of work depicts everyday life in nineteenth-century New Brunswick.

Taylor remained unheard of in the years following his death until 1954, when Max Aitken, 1st Baron Beaverbrook collected his pieces. On March 28, 1968, the Beaverbrook Art Gallery held a private exhibition to show pieces that had been recently donated, including eight of Taylor's oil paintings and four of his watercolors. Among those who attended included Lieutenant Governor Wallace Samuel Bird, Premier Louis Joseph Robichaud, legislative members, as well as the mayor of Fredericton. Later the same year, during the opening ceremony of the Provincial Archives of New Brunswick, a selection of Taylor's images were exhibited.

Around a thousand photographs taken by Taylor have since been collected by the provincial archives, additionally presenting Glass Plate Alchemist in 2019, which exhibited hundreds of Taylor's old glass negatives. That same year, Goose Lane Editions published Slow Seconds: The Photography of George Thomas Taylor, a biography about Taylor written by Ronald Rees and Joshua Green. In this book, Taylor was described as "the first wilderness photographer in the Maritimes and one of the first in all of Canada."

== Bibliography ==
- Rees, Ronald; Green, Joshua (2019). Slow Seconds: The Photography Of George Thomas Taylor. Fredericton, New Brunswick: Goose Lane Editions. ISBN 9781773101361.
