= Mark Taylor (drummer) =

English jazz drummer

Mark Anthony Taylor (born 7 November 1962, London) is an English jazz drummer.

Taylor started to play drums at the age of five, and played with Eddie Thompson and Al Cohn as a teenager. He worked with Kenny Barron, George Coleman, Johnny Griffin, Pharoah Sanders, and Bobby Watson early in his career. His other associations include work with Alan Barnes, Gordon Beck, Mike Carr, Geoff Castle, Alec Dankworth, John Dankworth, Kenny Drew, Chris Flory, Herb Geller, Dick Morrissey, Niels-Henning Ørsted Pedersen, Pizza Express All Stars, Lew Tabackin, Uncle John Renshaw, Ken Colyer and John Taylor.
