= Jeffrey Taylor =

Jeffrey or Jeff Taylor may refer to:

== Sports ==
- Jeffery Taylor (born 1989), Swedish-American basketball player; son of basketball player Jeff Taylor
- Jeff Taylor (basketball) (1960–2020), American basketball player
- Jeff Taylor (footballer) (1930–2010), British footballer
- Jeff Taylor (ice hockey), American ice hockey player drafted by the Pittsburgh Penguins in 2014 NHL entry draft
- Jeff Taylor (wrestler) or Scotty 2 Hotty (born 1973), American professional wrestler
- Jeff Taylor (pole vaulter) (born 1953), American pole vaulter, 1973–1974 All-American for the Washington Huskies track and field team

== Other ==
- Jeffrey A. Taylor, former United States Attorney
- Jeffery R. Taylor, Kentucky politician
- Jeff Taylor (entrepreneur), American internet entrepreneur, founder of Monster.com
- Jeff Taylor (journalist), 1992 Pulitzer Prize winner
- Jeff Taylor (politician) (born 1961), American professor and politician from Iowa
- Jeff Taylor (musical artist) (born 1957), Keyboard and accordion player

== See also ==
- Geoffrey Taylor (disambiguation)
