= Matt Taylor (scientist) =

British astrophysicist (born 1973)

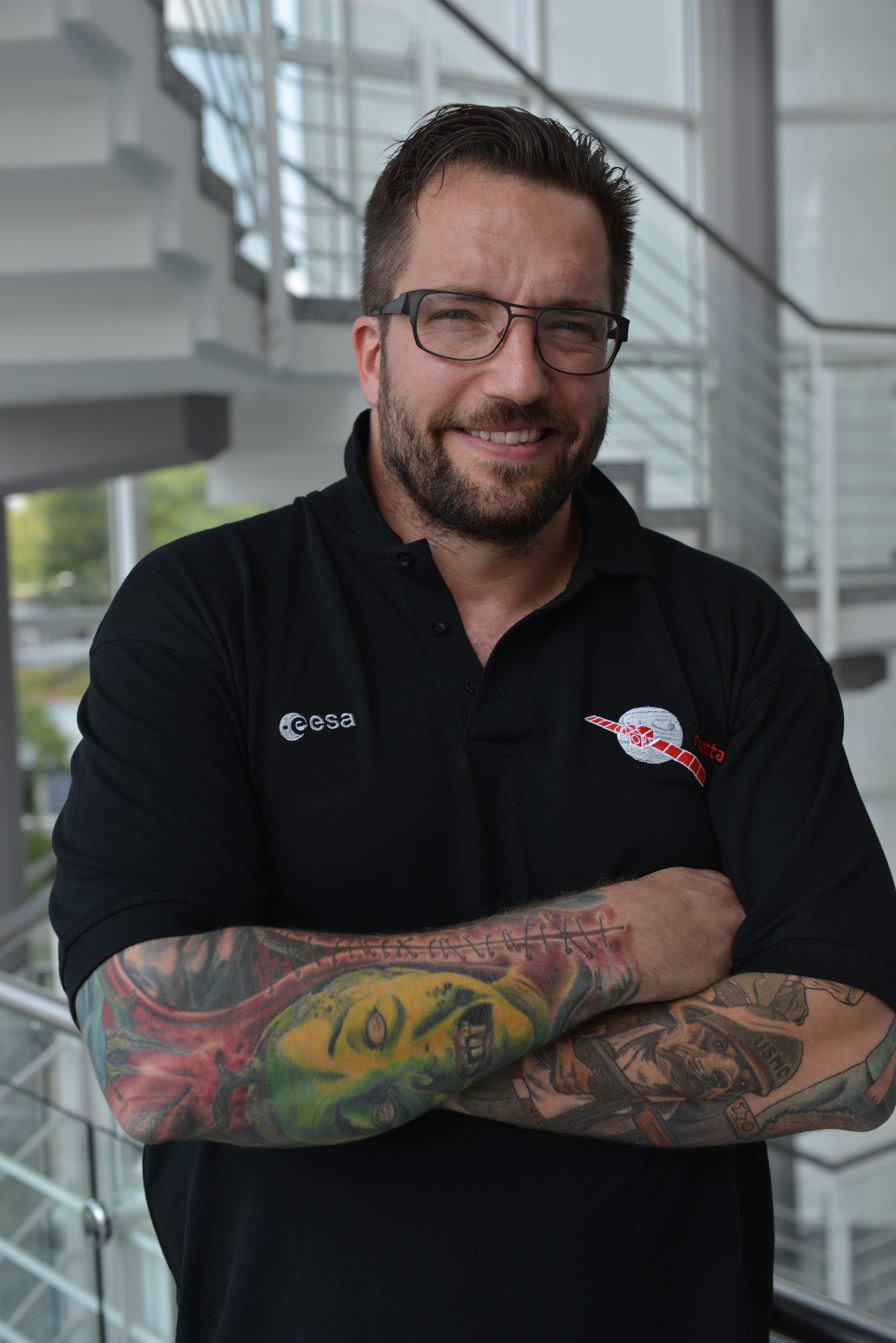
- Taylor photographed in August 2014.
- Born: Matthew Graham George Thaddeus Taylor; 1973 (age 52–53); Manor Park, London, England
- Education: University of Liverpool (BSc); Imperial College London (PhD)
- Scientific career
- Workplaces: European Space Agency
- Thesis: MHD modelling of space plasmas (2001)
- Website: cosmos.esa.int/web/personal-profiles/matt-taylor

Matthew Graham George Thaddeus Taylor (born 1973) is a British astrophysicist employed by the European Space Agency. He is best known to the public for his involvement in the Rosetta mission, the first mission to make landfall on a comet. Taylor was the mission's project scientist.

== Early life ==
Taylor was born in Manor Park, London, in 1973. He is the son of a bricklayer, and worked alongside his father on building sites during his summer breaks from university.

== Education ==
Taylor received a degree in physics from the University of Liverpool. He then earned a PhD in space physics from Imperial College London, focusing on magnetohydrodynamic modelling of astrophysical plasma in the magnetosphere.

== Career ==
Taylor's research career began when he became a research fellow at the Mullard Space Science Laboratory working on the Cluster mission. This position led to his appointment as Cluster project scientist in 2005. In summer 2013, Taylor became a project scientist for the Rosetta mission. The following year, Rosetta's lander, Philae, made landfall on the nucleus of the comet 67P/Churyumov–Gerasimenko. A press conference Taylor gave about the landing became the subject of controversy after certain commentators found fault with the shirt he had worn, which featured images of scantily clad women. Taylor subsequently apologised. In 2018, he was awarded the Royal Astronomical Society Service Award for Geophysics for his work on the mission.

Taylor is an author on 70 publications, primarily on the topic of aurorae. His research has been published in leading journals, including Nature, the Journal of Geophysical Research, Geophysical Research Letters and the Annales Geophysicae.

== Personal life ==
Taylor's wife is Leanne. They have two children.

Taylor is a devoted fan of heavy metal, especially death metal. He has posed with David Vincent of Morbid Angel for the magazine Metal Hammer, as well as having been photographed wearing Cannibal Corpse shirts multiple times. He wrote the foreword to David Vincent's biography I Am Morbid: Ten Lessons Learned From Extreme Metal, Outlaw Country, and the Power of Self-Determination.

Taylor has a tattoo of the Rosetta spacecraft and its lander on his leg, which he had done after the craft was successfully woken from hibernation in 2014.
