= Oliver Taylor (footballer, born 1880) =

English footballer

Personal information
- Full name: Oliver Taylor
- Date of birth: 1880
- Place of birth: Wednesfield, England
- Position: Goalkeeper

Senior career*
Years	Team	Apps	(Gls)
1900–1901	Bilston United		
1901–1903	West Bromwich Albion	5	(0)
1903–1904	Coventry City		
Total		5	(0)
- * Club domestic league appearances and goals

Oliver Taylor (1880–unknown) was an English footballer who played in the Football League for West Bromwich Albion.
