= Sarah Taylor (vivandière) =

Union vivandière in the American Civil War

Sarah Jane Taylor (1841 – 1886), was a vivandière for the Union during the American Civil War. She was the stepdaughter of Col. James A. Doughty, a Knoxville native who served as a captain in the 1st Regiment Tennessee Volunteer Infantry at Camp Dick Robinson in Kentucky, and the daughter of William and Betsy Keith Taylor of Anderson County, Tennessee.

Loyalty to the federal government was a crime in the South. On September 20, 1861, Taylor fled her home in Eastern Tennessee by foot, then crossed the Kentucky border a few days later. In an autobiographical essay, she writes that she was unanimously elected Daughter of the 1st Tennessee Regiment. She traveled with the company at the Battle of Camp Wildcat. She was arrested on June 19, 1862 in Jacksonboro, Georgia as a Union spy.
