= Michael Taylor =

Michael Taylor may refer to:

== Art ==
- Michael Taylor (designer) (1927–1986), American interior designer
- Michael Taylor (glass artist) (born 1944), American studio glass artist, teacher and lecturer
- Michael Taylor (English artist) (born 1952), English painter
- Michael R. Taylor (art historian), British/American art historian and museum curator

== Entertainment ==
- Mick Taylor (born 1949), former member of the Rolling Stones
  - Mick Taylor (album)
- Michael Taylor (film producer), American film producer and academic
- Michael Taylor (screenwriter) (born 1969), American science fiction TV writer
- Prettifun (Michael-Raymond Javier Taylor, born 2005), American rapper and songwriter

== Politics and government ==
- Michael Angelo Taylor (1757–1834), English politician
- Michael Taylor (political scientist) (born 1942), American political theorist and political economist
- Michael R. Taylor, Deputy Commissioner for Foods at the FDA

== Sports ==
- Michael Henry Taylor (1918–2005), English swimmer
- Michael Taylor (Australian footballer) (born 1953), for Collingwood and Norwood
- Michael Taylor (Australian cricketer) (born 1955)
- Michael Taylor (American football), (born c. 1968) quarterback for the University of Michigan football team, 1987–1989
- Michael Taylor (English footballer) (born 1982)
- Michael Taylor (baseball, born 1985), American baseball outfielder
- Michael Taylor (swimmer) (born 1989), swimmer from the Marshall Islands
- Michael A. Taylor (born 1991), American baseball outfielder

== Other ==
- Michael Waistell Taylor (1824–1892), Scottish physician and antiquary
- Michael Taylor (British killer) (born 1944), British killer notable for alleged demonic possession
- Michael E. Taylor (born 1946), American mathematician
- Michael Taylor (forester) (born 1966), discoverer of champion and tallest trees
- Michael Taylor (American murderer) (1967–2014), convicted murderer from Missouri
- Michael P. Taylor (born 1968), British computer programmer and paleontologist
- Michael Taylor (historian) (born 1988), Northern Irish historian and former cricketer
- Michael L. Taylor, U.S. Special Forces veteran convicted for aiding Carlos Ghosn

== See also ==
- Mike Taylor (disambiguation)
