= Olly Taylor =

English footballer

Personal information
- Full name: Oliver Scott Taylor
- Date of birth: 13 December 1993 (age 32)
- Place of birth: Oxford, England
- Height: 6 ft 0 in (1.83 m)
- Position: Forward

Team information
- Current team: Dorchester Town

Youth career
- 2010–2012: Wycombe Wanderers

Senior career*
Years	Team	Apps	(Gls)
2012–2013	Wycombe Wanderers	6	(0)
2012	→ Hitchin Town (loan)	6	(0)
2013–2015	Woking	2	(0)
2014–2015	→ Frome Town (loan)	22	(8)
2015	Frome Town	5	(1)
2015–2017	Chippenham Town	29	(7)
2017–	Dorchester Town	0	(0)
- * Club domestic league appearances and goals as of 00:44, 15 April 2016

Oliver Scott Taylor (born 13 December 1993) is an English footballer who plays as a forward for Dorchester Town.

== Career ==
Taylor started a two-year scholarship with Wycombe Wanderers in 2010. He finished his scholarship and signed his first professional contract in April 2012. He made his professional debut on 15 September 2012, in a 3–1 defeat away to Chesterfield in Football League Two, coming on as a substitute for Adam Thompson.

On 20 November 2012, Taylor joined semi-professional side, Hitchin Town on a two-month loan deal. Taylor was released by Wycombe Wanderers in May 2013 and was without a club until joining Woking in the Football Conference for the 2014–15 season. To date Taylor has failed to make an impact, with only one substitute appearance.
