= Matt Taylor (meteorologist) =

English meteorologist and presenter

- Born: Matthew John Taylor; 3 June 1976 (age 50); Blackburn, Lancashire, England, UK
- Education: BSc (Hons) Cardiff University; Open University
- Occupation: Meteorologist
- Years active: 1996–present
- Employer: BBC
- Television: BBC Weather

Matt Taylor's voice
recorded January 2014

Matthew John Taylor (born 3 June 1976) is an English meteorologist and BBC Weather presenter.

== Early life ==
Originally from Blackburn, Lancashire, Taylor was raised in Glasgow. Taylor has a degree in City and Regional Planning from Cardiff University where he studied before working for a local council in Lincolnshire. In the next couple of years, Taylor took physics and mathematics courses through the Open University in order to improve his chances of gaining a place on the weather-forecasting programme at the Met Office College.

== Broadcasting career ==
Having worked as a Met Office meteorologist since 1998, Matt joined the BBC Weather team in 2004, originally working at the Cardiff weather centre. He now broadcasts across a range of BBC outlets, including BBC One, BBC News, BBC World News, Radio 1, Radio 2, Radio 4 and 5 Live. He is a regular weather forecaster on BBC Breakfast, mainly at the weekends and often forecasts for Radio 4's Today.
