= Oliver Taylor (footballer, born 1869) =

Welsh footballer

Personal information
- Date of birth: 1869
- Place of birth: Wales
- Date of death: 1945 (aged 75–76)

International career
Years	Team	Apps	(Gls)
1893–1894	Wales	4	(0)

Oliver Taylor (1869–1945) was a Welsh international footballer. He was part of the Wales national football team between 1893 and 1894, playing 4 matches. He played his first match on 18 March 1893 against Scotland and his last match on 24 March 1894 against Scotland.

== See also ==
- List of Wales international footballers (alphabetical)
