= James Madison Taylor =

James Madison Taylor, better known as Matt Taylor, was an early settler of southeastern Idaho. He built a toll bridge over the Snake River at Black Rock Canyon. Idaho Falls was eventually established at the site of this bridge. The original bridge no longer stands, but a replica (erected by the Rotary Club) was dedicated in 1996.

Matt Taylor served in the Territorial Legislature in 1868. He left the area for Missouri in 1886.

== The Taylor Toll Bridge ==
Taylor's Bridge circa 1870

Matt Taylor, a freighter by trade, frequently camped along Black Rock Canyon on his way to the Eagle Rock Ferry. The gorge was narrow, which made the river flow faster, which in turn meant this campsite had fewer mosquitos.

One evening he measured the canyon by throwing a stone tied to a string, and learned that the canyon was 83 feet (25 m) wide. He later found suitably straight timber in Beaver Canyon, 80 miles (130 km) away. These timbers, along with scrap iron from old wagons and a Missouri River steamboat, became the raw materials needed to build the bridge.

In 1864 he found two business partners and formed the Oneida Road, Bridge and Ferry Company, the first corporation formed in what would become Bonneville County. This corporation bought out the ferry, and in the fall of that year built a stage station. This included a blacksmith shop, employee housing, a barn, and a store. Construction of the bridge went on during the winter, because it was easier to build the bridge when the river was frozen. It was operational by May 1865.
