= Sarah Katherine Taylor =

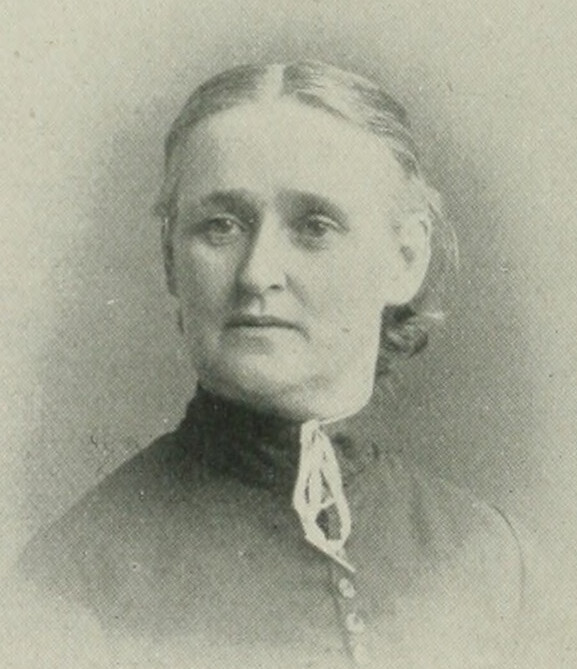
- "A Woman of the Century"
- Born: Sarah Katherine Paine; November 19, 1847; Danielsonville, Connecticut, USA
- Died: May 28, 1920; Bridgton, Maine, USA
- Other names: Sarah K. Taylor
- Occupations: evangelist; temperance activist; newspaper editor
- Known for: founder, Woman's Home and Foreign Mission Society of the Advent Christian Church

Sarah Katherine Taylor (née, Paine; pen name, Sarah K. Taylor; November 19, 1847 – May 28, 1920) was an American evangelist and temperance activist. She was the editor of, The Little Christian, All Nations Monthly, and Bible Faith Mission Standard.

== Early life and education ==
Sarah Katherine Paine was born in Danielsonville, Connecticut, November 19, 1847. Her father was Reuben Paine. Her mother's maiden name was Susan A. Parkhurst. Her father died when she was thirteen years of age. She had six siblings, John, Elwyn, Emily, Charles, Harlan, and Clarence.

Sarah attended but two terms of school after the death of her father and then was obliged to leave home to do housework for two years, after which she entered a shoe shop. Not satisfied with that work, she studied evenings and fitted herself for a teacher.

== Career ==
When eighteen years of age, she felt called to gospel work and began to hold children's meetings, to write for religious papers, and to talk to assemblies in schoolhouses, kitchens, halls and churches. In 1868, she went to work in the office of The Christian, in Boston, Massachusetts, where for the first time she met Rev. Austin Wheeler Taylor (1843-1929), a young minister from Byron, Maine, who afterwards went south to teach the Freedmen. In January, 1869, Miss Paine went to Seabrook, New Hampshire, and gave herself wholly to gospel work, holding meetings evenings, and during each day, visiting from house to house, reading the Bible and praying with the families. Many were converted. A church was organized and a church edifice was built. In April, she went to Belmont, New Hampshire, and held a protracted meeting in the Christian church. More than 150 professed conversion. That summer, she held meetings in New Hampshire, Massachusetts, and Rhode Island, seeing many converted.

In August, Rev. Taylor returned from the South, and on September 3, 1869, they were married. They had two children, including a girl, Alice.

For several years they held meetings together in the New England States, often in summer using a large tent for a church. In 1875-76, Mrs. Taylor taught school in Atlantic City, New Jersey, preaching Sundays and having charge of a Sunday-school of about 200 members. From 1877 to 1887, her home was in Harrison, Maine, from where she and her husband went out to labor.

Rev. Taylor was pastor of a church in Kennebunk, Maine, for two years, Mrs. Taylor assisting him by preaching half the time. She was an associate pastor (with husband) in Kennebunkport, Maine, 1878, 1879.

She spent the years 1881-82, in Boston, editing The Little Christian, a children's paper. While there, she became deeply interested in homeless children, and when she returned to Maine in the spring of 1883, she took six young children with her, for whom she obtained good homes. That work was continued for many years, and more than 40 children were placed with families. Some of those children she kept with her for years, and one she adopted. That work was done almost entirely at her own expense.

Although much of the time in delicate health and doing her own housework, she made it a rule to spend a short time each day in study, which included the sciences, Latin, Greek, Spanish, French and German. In 1889, Rev. Taylor accepted the pastorate of a church in Bridgton, Maine, and there they since resided. Mrs. Taylor was engaged in preaching, lecturing, writing, holding children's meetings, organizing Sunday-schools and doing missionary work. She served as pastor in Kennebunkport, 1894-98; and as associate pastor thereafter at Rockland, Maine.

In 1897, Taylor, as president and business manager established the Woman's Home and Foreign Mission Society of the Advent Christian Church. In one year, it grew from four to three hundred members. The object of the organization was to engage and unite the efforts of Christian women of the Advent Christian denomination in sending the Gospel throughout the world, to deepend the spiritual life among believers in Christ, and by organization, to render more efficient the work of the women of the Advent Christian Church. Taylor was editor of its organ, All nations Monthly, published in Bridgton, Maine. She was also the editor of the Bible Faith Mission Standard, published in the same town.

In 1908–09, she made a tour of the world, visiting missions.

== Death ==
Sarah Katherine Taylor died at Bridgton, Maine, May 28, 1920, and was buried in that town.

== Selected works ==
- Child wives and widows of India
- Letter from Sarah K. Taylor answering some criticisms of her work, 1905
- A true but partial history of the Woman's Home and Foreign Missions Society of the Advent Christian Denomination, 1912
- God's financial method , 1915
