= Tyler (name) =

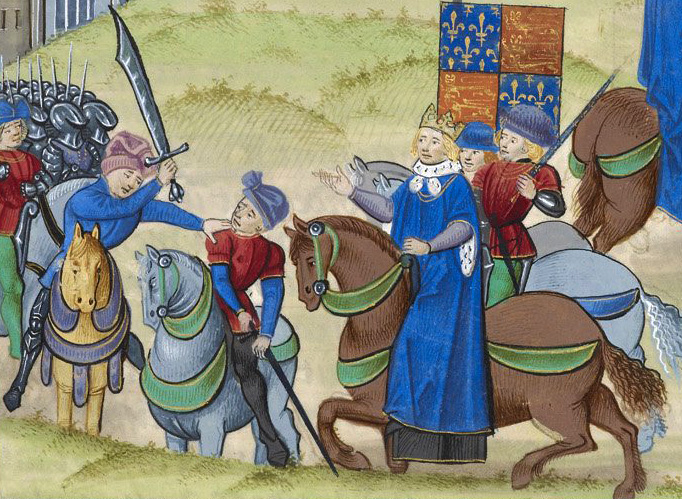
- Death of Wat Tyler
- Pronunciation: /ˈtaɪlər/
- Gender: Unisex
- Language: English

Origin
- Language: Old English
- Origin: Tyler (surname)
- Meaning: "Maker or layer of tiles, house builder" or "Doorkeeper of Inn or Tavern"
- Region of origin: England

Other names
- Short form: Ty
- Related names: Taylor, Tiler, Tylor
- Frequency and comparison

Tyler is a given name that is gender-neutral but predominantly male, as well as a surname.

It is an Old English name derived from the Old French tieuleor, tieulier (tiler, tile maker) and the Middle English tyler, tylere. The name was originally an occupational name for a housebuilder, one who lays tiles or bricks. It also holds the meaning of "doorkeeper of an inn" or "owner of a tavern", derived from its use in freemasonry as the name of the office of the outer guard. Among the earliest recorded uses of the surname is Wat Tyler (1341–1381) of Kent, England.

== People with the surname Tyler ==
- Aisha Tyler (born 1970), American actress, comedian, director, and talk show host
- Anne Tyler (born 1941), American novelist
- Billy Tyler (1900–1974), English footballer
- Bonnie Tyler (1951–2026), Welsh rock singer
- Devin Tyler (born 1986), American football player
- Fred Tyler (born 1954), US Olympic team swimmer and aquatics coach
- Gary Tyler (born 1958), American prisoner
- George Tyler (disambiguation), multiple people
- Harold I. Tyler (1901–1967), New York assemblyman
- Harold R. Tyler, Jr. (1922–2005), federal judge in New York
- Harrison Ruffin Tyler (1928–2025), American chemical engineer, businessperson, and preservationist
- Harry Tyler (disambiguation), multiple people
- James Hoge Tyler (1846–1925), American politician
- Jeremy Tyler (born 1991), American basketball player
- John Tyler Sr. (1747–1813), governor of Virginia and father of President John Tyler Jr.
- John Tyler Jr. (1790–1862), tenth president of the United States
- Julia Gardiner Tyler (1820–1889), second wife of President John Tyler
- Kenneth E. Tyler (born 1931), American master printer and arts educator
- Kyle Tyler (born 1996), American baseball player
- L C Tyler (fl. 2000s), British writer of comic crime fiction
- Lefty Tyler (1889–1953), born George Albert Tyler, American professional baseball pitcher 1910–1921
- Letitia Christian Tyler (1790–1842), first wife of President John Tyler
- Linda Tyler, New Zealand art historian
- Liv Tyler (born 1977), American actress, model, and daughter of Steven Tyler
- Lyon Gardiner Tyler (1853–1935), American educator and historian
- Marilyn Tyler (1926–2017), American operatic soprano
- Mark Tyler (born 1977), English professional footballer
- Martin Tyler (born 1945), English sports commentator
- Michael J. Tyler (1937–2020), South Australian herpetologist, known as "The Frog Man"
- Parker Tyler (1904–1974), American author, poet, and film critic
- Paul Tyler, Baron Tyler (born 1941), English member of the House of Lords
- Richard Tyler (architect) (1916–2009), English architect
- Robert C. Tyler (1832–1865), Massachusetts-born general in the Confederate Army during the War for Southern Independence
- Robert O. Tyler (1831–1874), American Civil War general in the Union Army
- Stephanie Tyler, British Ornithologist
- Steven Tyler (born 1948), American musician, songwriter and lead singer of Aerosmith
- Syd Tyler (1904–1971), English footballer
- Tank Tyler (Demarcus Lamon Tyler, born 1985), American football player
- Ted Tyler (Edwin James Tyler, 1864–1917), English cricketer
- T. Texas Tyler (1916–1972), American country music singer
- Tom Tyler (1903–1954), American actor
- Varro Eugene Tyler (1926–2001), American philatelist
- Wat Tyler (died 1381), English leader of the English Peasants' Revolt of 1381
- William Seymour Tyler (1810–1897), American historian

== People with the middle name Tyler ==
- Richard Tyler Blevins (born 1991), American Twitch streamer and Internet personality
- Jesse Tyler Ferguson (born 1975), American actor
- Zachary Tyler Fruit (born 2000), American baseball player
- Mary Tyler Moore (1936–2017), American actress
- Brandon Sklenar (born 1990), American actor born Brandon Tyler Feakins

== People with the given name Tyler ==
=== Men ===
- Tyler, the Creator (born Tyler Gregory Okonma, 1991), American rapper, singer, songwriter, actor, fashion designer, and record producer
- tyler1 (born Tyler Steinkamp, 1995), American Twitch streamer and online personality
- Tyler Abell (born 1932), American lawyer
- Tyler Acord (born 1990), American record producer and songwriter
- Tyler Adams (born 1999), American soccer player
- Tyler Aldridge (born 1984), American professional golfer
- Tyler Alexander (born 1994), American baseball player
- Tyler Allen (born 1987), American NASCAR race engineer
- Tyler Allgeier (born 2000), American football player
- Tyler Alvarez (born 1997), American actor
- Tyler Anbinder (born 1962), American historian
- Tyler Anderson (born 1989), American baseball pitcher
- Tyler Ankrum (born 2001), American stock car racing driver
- Tyler Ardron (born 1991), Canadian rugby union player
- Tyler Armstrong (born 2004), American mountain climber
- Tyler Arnason (born 1979), American ice hockey player
- Tyler Arnone (born 1991), American soccer player
- Tyler Attardo (born 2001), Canadian soccer player
- Tyler August (born 1983), American politician
- Tyler Austin (born 1991), American professional baseball player
- Tyler Badie (born 1999), American football player
- Tyler Baker (disambiguation), Multiple people
- Tyler Barnhardt (born 1993), American actor
- Tyler Bashlor (born 1993), American baseball player
- Tyler Bass (born 1997), American football player
- Tyler Bate (born 1997), English professional wrestler
- Tyler Bates (born 1965), American musician
- Tyler Batty (born 2000), American football player
- Tyler Baze (born 1982), American champion jockey
- Tyler Beach (born 1999), American football player
- Tyler Beechey (born 1981), Canadian ice hockey player
- Tyler Beede (born 1993), American baseball player
- Tyler Bellamy (born 2001), American soccer player
- Tyler Beskorowany (born 1990), Canadian ice hockey player
- Tyler Bennett (born 1992), American Paralympic footballer
- Tyler Benson (born 1998), Canadian ice hockey player
- Tyler Bertuzzi (born 1995), Canadian ice hockey player
- Tyler Bey (born 1998), American basketball player
- Tyler Biadasz (born 1997), American football player
- Tyler Biggs (born 1993), American ice hockey player
- Tyler Birch (born 1995), New Zealand rugby league footballer
- Tyler Black (disambiguation), Multiple people
- Tyler Blackburn (born 1986), American actor and singer
- Tyler Blackett (born 1994), English professional footballer
- Tyler Blackwood (born 1991), English footballer
- Tyler Blanski (born 1984), American musician, author and record producer
- Tyler Bleyendaal (born 1990), New Zealand rugby player
- Tyler Booker (born 2004), American football player
- Tyler Booth (born 1996), American musician
- Tyler Bouck (born 1980), Canadian ice hockey player
- Tyler Boudreau (born 1971), American military veteran
- Tyler Botha (born 1980), South African skeleton racer
- Tyler Bowen (born 1989), American football player
- Tyler Boyd (disambiguation), multiple people
- Tyler Bozak (born 1986), Canadian ice hockey player
- Tyler Bradt (born 1986), American whitewater kayaker
- Tyler Bray (born 1991), American football player
- Tyler Brayton (born 1979), American football player
- Tyler Brenner (born 1988), Canadian ice hockey player
- Tyler Brickler (born 1991), American ice hockey player
- Tyler Brown (disambiguation), multiple people
- Tyler Brûlé (born 1968), Canadian journalist and magazine publisher
- Tyler Breeze (born 1988), Canadian professional wrestler
- Tyler Bryant (born 1991), American rock musician
- Tyler Buchner (born 2002), American football player
- Tyler Bunch (born 1970), American actor, director and puppet designer
- Tyler Bunz (born 1992), Canadian ice hockey player
- Tyler Burton (born 2000), American basketball player
- Tyler Butterfield (born 1983), Bermudian cyclist and triathlete
- Tyler Cain (born 1987), American basketball player
- Tyler Cameron (born 1993), American television personality and model
- Tyler Carter (born 1991), American singer, songwriter and musician
- Tyler Carter (alpine skier) (born 1994), American para-alpine skier
- Tyler Cassel (born 1995), Scottish footballer
- Tyler Cassidy (born 1993), American singer, songwriter and rapper better known by the name 'Froggy Fresh'
- Tyler Catalina (born 1993), American football player
- Tyler Cavanaugh (born 1994), American basketball player
- Tyler Chatwood (born 1989), American baseball player
- Tyler Childers (born 1991), American singer and songwriter
- Tyler Christopher (disambiguation), Multiple people
- Tyler Clary (born 1989), American swimmer
- Tyler Clippard (born 1985), American baseball player
- Tyler Cloyd (born 1984), American baseball player
- Tyler Clutts (born 1984), American football player
- Tyler Collins (disambiguation), Multiple people
- Tyler Colvin (born 1985), American baseball player
- Tyler Conklin (born 1995), American football player
- Tyler Connolly (born 1975), Canadian vocalist and guitarist for rock band Theory of a Deadman
- Tyler Cook (born 1997), American basketball player
- Tyler Coppin (born 1956), American-Australian actor
- Tyler Cowen (born 1962), American professor
- Tyler Coyle (born 1998), American football player
- Tyler Crapigna (born 1992), Canadian football player
- Tyler Cravy (born 1989), American baseball player
- Tyler Cuma (born 1990), Canadian-Austrian ice hockey player
- Tyler Curry (born 1983), American HIV activist
- Tyler Danish (born 1994), American baseball player
- Tyler Davis (disambiguation), multiple people
- Tyler Deis (born 1974), Canadian ice hockey player
- Tyler Denton (born 1995), English professional footballer
- Tyler Denny (born 1991), English professional boxer
- Tyler Deric (born 1988), American soccer player
- Tyler Dickerson (born 1993), American country music artist
- Tyler Dickinson (born 1996), English rugby league footballer
- Tyler Diep (born 1983), Vietnamese born American politician
- Tyler Dietrich (born 1984), Canadian ice hockey coach
- Tyler Dippel (born 2000), American professional stock car racing driver
- Tyler Donati (born 1986), Canadian ice hockey player
- Tyler Dorsey (born 1996), American basketball player in the Israeli Basketball Premier League
- Tyler Dueck (born 1986), Canadian racing driver
- Tyler Duffey (born 1990), American baseball player
- Tyler Duncan (born 1989), American golfer
- Tyler Ebell (born 1983), Canadian football running back
- Tyler Eckford (born 1985), Canadian ice hockey player
- Tyler Edey (born 1984), Canadian billiards player
- Tyler Eifert (born 1990), American football player, tight end for the Cincinnati Bengals
- Tyler Engel (born 1992), American soccer player
- Tyler Ennis (disambiguation), multiple people
- Tyler Eppler (born 1993), American baseball player
- Tyler Ervin (born 1993), American football player
- Tyler Evans (disambiguation), multiple people
- Tyler Everett (born 1983), American football safety
- Tyler Ewing (born 1984), American television composer
- Tyler Farnsworth, American politician
- Tyler Farr (born 1984), American country music singer and songwriter
- Tyler Farrar (born 1984), American cyclist
- Tyler Ferguson (born 1993), American baseball player
- Tyler Fisher (born 1993), South African rugby player
- Tyler Florence (born 1971), American chef and television personality
- Tyler Flowers (born 1986), American baseball player
- Tyler Forbes (disambiguation), Multiple people
- Tyler Ford (born 1990), American writer
- Tyler Fredrickson (born 1981), American football player
- Tyler Freeman (disambiguation), Multiple people
- Tyler French (born 1999), English professional footballer
- Tyler Frost (born 1999), English professional footballer
- Tyler Gabarra (born 1997), American soccer player
- Tyler Gaffney (born 1984), American baseball player
- Tyler Gaudet (born 1984), Canadian ice hockey player
- Tyler Garratt (born 1996), English footballer
- Tyler Gauthier (born 1997), American football player
- Tyler George (born 1982), American curler
- Tyler Geving (born 1973), American basketball player
- Tyler Gibson (born 1991), American soccer player
- Tyler Gillett (born 1982), American film director
- Tyler Goeddel (born 1996), American baseball player
- Tyler Goodrham (born 2003), English professional footballer
- Tyler Goodson (born 2000), American football player
- Tyler Glasnow (born 1993), American baseball player
- Tyler Glenn (born 1983), lead singer and keyboardist of Neon Trees
- Tyler Graham (born 1984), American baseball player
- Tyler Graovac (born 1993), Canadian ice hockey player
- Tyler Green (disambiguation), multiple people
- Tyler Griffey (born 1990), American basketball player
- Tyler Grisham (born 1987), American football player
- Tyler Gron (born 1989), Canadian ice hockey player
- Tyler Guilfoil (born 2000), American baseball player
- Tyler Hall (disambiguation), multiple people
- Tyler Hamilton (born 1971), American cyclist
- Tyler Hanes (born 1990), American actor, singer and dancer
- Tyler Hansbrough (born 1985), American basketball player
- Tyler Harrell (born 2000), American football player
- Tyler Harvey (disambiguation), Multiple people
- Tyler Haws (born 1991), American baseball player
- Tyler Heineman (born 1991), American baseball player
- Tyler Hemming (born 1985), Canadian soccer player
- Tyler Hentschel (born 1982), American guitarist
- Tyler Herro (born 2000), American basketball player
- Tyler Herron (1986–2021), American baseball player
- Tyler Hicks (born 1969), American photojournalist
- Tyler Higbee (born 1993), American football player
- Tyler Higgins (born 1991), American baseball player
- Tyler Hill (disambiguation), Multiple people
- Tyler Hilton (born 1983), American singer/songwriter/actor
- Tyler Hines (born 1990), American basketball player
- Tyler Hinman (born 1984), American crossword solver
- Tyler Hoechlin (born 1987), American actor
- Tyler Hogan (born 1998), Australian curler
- Tyler Holmes (born 1988), Canadian football player
- Tyler Holt (born 1989), American baseball player
- Tyler Honeycutt (1990–2018), American basketball player
- Tyler Hoover (disambiguation), Multiple people
- Tyler Horn (born 1989), American football player
- Tyler Hornby-Forbes (born 1996), British Virgins Islands footballer
- Tyler Houston (born 1971), American baseball player
- Tyler Hubbard (born 1987), American singer/songwriter
- Tyler Hughes (soccer) (born 1980), Canadian professional soccer player
- Tyler Hughes (American football), American football coach
- Tyler Huntley (born 1998), American football player
- Tyler Hynes (born 1986), Canadian actor
- Tyler Ivey (born 1996), American baseball player
- Tyler James (disambiguation), Multiple people
- Tyler Johnson (disambiguation), multiple people
- Tyler Johnstone (born 1992), American football player
- Tyler Patrick Jones (born 1994), American actor
- Tyler Joseph (born 1988), American musician in the band Twenty One Pilots
- Tyler Kahmann (born 2000), American football player
- Tyler Kalinoski (born 1992), American basketball player
- Tyler Kennedy (born 1986), Canadian professional hockey player
- Tyler Kent (1911–1988), American diplomat and convicted spy
- Tyler Kepkay (born 1987), Canadian basketball player
- Tyler Kettering (born 1984), American soccer player
- Tyler Kinley (born 1991), American baseball pitcher
- Tyler Knight (born 1984), American indoor football linebacker
- Tyler Kolek (disambiguation), Multiple people
- Tyler Kornfield (born 1991), American Olympic cross-country skier
- Tyler Krieger (born 1994), American baseball player
- Tyler Kroft (born 1993), American football player
- Tyler Kyte (born 1984), Canadian actor and musician
- Tyler Labine (born 1978), Canadian actor
- Tyler Lacy (born 1999), American football player
- Tyler Ladendorf (born 1988), American baseball player
- Tyler Lafauci (born 1952), American football player
- Tyler Lamb (born 1991), American basketball player
- Tyler Lancaster (born 1994), American football player
- Tyler Larsen (born 1991), American football player
- Tyler Larter (born 1968), Canadian ice hockey centre
- Tyler Lawlor (born 1990), Canadian canoer
- Tyler LaTorre (born 1983), American baseball coach
- Tyler Lepley (born 1983), American actor
- Tyler Lewington (born 1994), Canadian ice hockey player
- Tyler LeVander (born 1990), American musician and producer
- Tyler Light (born 1991), American golfer
- Tyler Linderbaum (born 2001), American football player
- Tyler Lindholm (born 1983), American politician
- Tyler Lockett (born 1992), American football player
- Tyler C. Lockett (1932–2020), Kansas judge
- Tyler Lorenzen (born 1985), American football player
- Tyler Lovell (born 1987), Australian hockey player
- Tyler Ludwig (born 1985), American ice hockey player
- Tyler Luellen (born 1984), American football player
- Tyler Lumsden (born 1983), American baseball player
- Tyler Lydon (born 1990), American basketball player
- Tyler Lyons (born 1998), American baseball player
- Tyler Lyttle (born 1996), English footballer
- Tyler Mabry (born 1996), American football player
- Tyler MacKay (born 1980), Canadian ice hockey player
- Tyler MacNiven, American filmmaker and reality TV contestant
- Tyler Madden (born 1999), American ice hockey player
- Tyler Mahle (born 1994), American baseball player
- Tyler Mane (born 1966), Canadian actor
- Tyler Marz (born 1992), American football player
- Tyler Matakevich (born 1992), American football player
- Tyler Matas (born 1994), Filipino-born American football player
- Tyler Matthews (born 1996), American stock car racing driver
- Tyler Mattison (born 1999), American baseball player
- Tyler Matzek (born 1990), American baseball player
- Tyler McCaughn (born 1982), American politician
- Tyler McCreary (born 1993), American boxer
- Tyler McCumber (born 1991), American professional golfer
- Tyler McGill (born 1987), American swimmer
- Tyler McGillivary
- Tyler McGregor (born 1994), Canadian ice hockey player
- Tyler Medeiros (born 1995), Canadian singer
- Tyler Menezes (born 1992), Canadian-American businessperson
- Tyler Merren (born 1984), American goalball player
- Tyler Metcalfe (born 1984), Canadian born Hungarian ice hockey player
- Tyler Miller (disambiguation), multiple people
- Tyler Mislawchuk (born 1994), Canadian professional triathlete
- Tyler Mitchell (disambiguation), Multiple people
- Tyler Mizoguchi (born 1989), American gymnast
- Tyler Moore (disambiguation), multiple people
- Tyler Morley (born 1991), Canadian ice hockey player
- Tyler Mosienko (born 1984), Canadian ice hockey player
- Tyler Moss (born 1975), Canadian ice hockey player
- Tyler Motte (born 1995), American ice hockey player
- Tyler Moy (born 1995), Swiss-American ice hockey player
- Tyler Mulder (born 1987), American track and field athlete
- Tyler Murphy (born 1992), American football player
- Tyler Myers (born 1990), American born Canadian ice hockey player
- Tyler Nase (born 1990), American rower
- Tyler Naquin (born 1991), American baseball player
- Tyler Neitzel (born 1991), American actor
- Tyler Nella (born 1988), Canadian alphine skier
- Tyler Nelson (disambiguation), Multiple people
- Tyler Nevin (born 1997), American baseball player
- Tyler Newton (born 1982), American basketball player
- Tyler Nicholson (born 1995), Canadian snowboarder
- Tyler Nickel (born 2003), American basketball player
- Tyler Nordgren (born 1969), American professor
- Tyler Nubin (born 2001), American football player
- Tyler O'Neill (born 1995), Canadian baseball player
- Tyler Oakley (born 1989), American vlogger and advocate for gay youth
- Tyler Oliveira (born 2000), American YouTuber and journalist
- Tyler Olson (disambiguation), multiple people
- Tyler Onyedim (born 2003), American football player
- Tyler Ott (born 1992), American football player
- Tyler Owens (born 2001), American football player
- Tyler Palko (born 1983), American football player
- Tyler Palmer (born 1950), American alpine skier
- Tyler Pasher (born 1994), Canadian soccer player
- Tyler Pastornicky (born 1989), American baseball player
- Tyler Patmon (born 1991), American football player
- Tyler Paul (born 1995), South African rugby player
- Tyler Perry (born 1969), American actor, filmmaker, television producer, songwriter, author
- Tyler Phillips (born 1997), American professional baseball pitcher
- Tyler Pierce (born 1998), American figure skater
- Tyler Pill (born 1990), American baseball player
- Tyler Pitlick (born 1991), American ice hockey player
- Tyler Pizarro (born 1986), Canadian jockey
- Tyler Polak (born 1992), American soccer player
- Tyler Polley (born 1999), American basketball player
- Tyler Polumbus (born 1985), American football player
- Tyler Pope (born 1977), American guitarist
- Tyler Posey (born 1991), American actor and musician
- Tyler Pursel (born 1983), American songwriter and record producer
- Tyler Randell (disambiguation), Multiple people
- Tyler Rasch (born 1988), American television personality
- Tyler Read (disambiguation), Multiple people
- Tyler Reddick (born 1996), American stock car racing driver
- Tyler Redenbach (born 1984), Canadian ice hockey player
- Tyler Reed (disambiguation), multiple people
- Tyler Rees (born 1999), Welsh snooker player
- Tyler Reese (born 1993), American musician
- Tyler Reid (disambiguation), Multiple people
- Tyler Relph (born 1984), American basketball player
- Tyler Rich (born 1986), American country music singer
- Tyler Richards (born 1986), Canadian lacrosse player
- Tyler Riggs (born 1986), American model and actor
- Tyler Ritter (born 1985), American actor
- Tyler Rix (born 1993), British singer and songwriter
- Tyler Roberson (born 1994), American basketball player
- Tyler Roberts (born 1999), English professional footballer
- Tyler Robertson (born 1987), American baseball player
- Tyler Robinson (disambiguation), multiple people
- Tyler Roehl (born 1986), American football coach
- Tyler Rogers (born 1990), American baseball player
- Tyler Rosenlund (born 1986), Canadian soccer player
- Tyler Ross (born 1989), American actor
- Tyler Rudy (born 1993), American soccer player
- Tyler Russell (born 1990), American football player
- Tyler Ruthven (born 1988), American soccer player
- Tyler Saladino (born 1989), American baseball player
- Tyler Samaniego (born 1999), American baseball player
- Tyler Sambrailo (born 1992), American football player
- Tyler Sanders (disambiguation), Multiple people
- Tyler Santucci (born 1988), American football coach
- Tyler Schlaffer (born 2001), American baseball player
- Tyler Schmitt (born 1986), American football player
- Tyler Schultz (born 1994), American shot putter
- Tyler Schweitzer (born 2000), American baseball player
- Tyler Scott (disambiguation), multiple people
- Tyler Seguin (born 1992), Canadian professional hockey player
- Tyler Seitz (born 1976), Canadian lunger
- Tyler Shandro (born 1976), Canadian lawyer and politician
- Tyler Shatley (born 1991), American football player
- Tyler Shattock (born 1990), Canadian professional ice hockey player
- Tyler Shaw (born 1993), Canadian singer and actor
- Tyler Sheehan (born 1987), American football player
- Tyler Shelast (born 1984), Canadian professional ice hockey player
- Tyler Shelvin (born 1998), American football player
- Tyler Shields (born 1982), American photographer
- Tyler Shoemaker (born 1988), American football player
- Tyler Shough (born 1999), American football player
- Tyler Smith (disambiguation), multiple people
- Tyler Skaggs (1991–2019), American baseball player
- Tyler Stableford (born 1975), American commercial director
- Tyler Starr (born 1991), American football player
- Tyler Steen (born 2000), American football player
- Tyler Stephenson (born 1996), American baseball player
- Tyler Stewart (born 1967), Canadian musician
- Tyler Stinson (born 1986), American mixed martial artist
- Tyler Stone (disambiguation), Multiple people
- Tyler Strafaci (born 1998), American golfer
- Tyler Stuart (born 1999), American baseball player
- Tyler Sturdevant (born 1985), American baseball player
- Tyler Summitt (born 1990), American basketball coach
- Tyler Tardi (born 1998), Canadian curler
- Tyler Tanner (born 1991), American professional stock race car driver
- Tyler Thigpen (born 1984), American football player
- Tyler Thomas (born 1990), American football player
- Tyler Thornburg (born 1988), American baseball player
- Tyler Toffoli (born 1992), Canadian ice hockey player
- Tyler Tolbert (born 1998), American baseball player
- Tyler Toner (Unknown birth date) Former professional mixed martial arts fighter
- Tyler Toney (born 1989), YouTuber and Internet Personality
- Tyler Turner (disambiguation), Multiple people
- Tyler Uberstine (born 1999), American baseball player
- Tyler Ulis (born 1996), American basketball player
- Tyler Van Dyke (born 2001), American football player
- Tyler Varga (born 1993), American football player
- Tyler Vaughns (born 1997), American football player
- Tyler Vitelli (born 2002), YouTuber and online personality
- Tyler Vlahovich (born 1967), American artist
- Tyler Volk, professor at New York University
- Tyler Vorpagel, American politician
- Tyler Vrabel (born 2000), American football player
- Tyler Wade (born 1994), American baseball player
- Tyler Wagner (born 1991), American baseball player
- Tyler Wahl (born 2001), American basketball player
- Tyler Walker (disambiguation), multiple people
- Tyler Ward (born 1988), American singer, songwriter and producer
- Tyler Warren (born 2002), American football player
- Tyler Webb (born 1990), American baseball player
- Tyler Weiman (born 1984), Canadian ice hockey player
- Tyler Weir (born 1990), English professional footballer
- Tyler Wells (born 1994), American baseball player
- Tyler White (born 1990), American baseball player
- Tyler Wideman (born 1995), American basketball player
- Tyler Wilkerson (born 1988), American basketball player
- Tyler Williams (disambiguation), multiple people
- Tyler Williamson (born 1972), American golfer
- Tyler Wilson (disambiguation), multiple people
- Tyler Winklevoss (born 1981), American investor
- Tyler Woessner (born 1999), American baseball player
- Tyler Wolff (born 2003), American soccer player
- Tyler Woods (born 1982), American singer-songwriter
- Tyler Wotherspoon (born 1993), Canadian ice hockey player
- Tyler Yarema (born 1993), Canadian singer and songwriter
- Tyler Yates (born 1977), American baseball player
- Tyler Young (disambiguation), multiple people
- Tyler Zeller (born 1990), American basketball player
- Tyler Zink (born 2001), American tennis player
- Tyler Zuber (born 1995), American baseball player

=== Women ===
- Tyler Clark Burke, Canadian artist, illustrator, designer, and writer
- Tyler Collins (disambiguation), Multiple people
- Tyler Devlin (born 1993), American drag performer and make-up artist
- Tyler Dodds (born 1996), English footballer
- Tyler Haney, American businesswoman and founder of the company Outdoor Voices
- Tyler Heavner (born 1996), American drag performer and musician
- Tyler Hyde, Member rock band Black Country, New Road
- Tyler Layton (born 1968), American actress
- Tyler Lewis (born 2001), English singer and songwriter
- Tyler Lussi (born 1995), American professional soccer player
- Tyler Mills, American poet, essayist, editor, and scholar
- Tyler-Jane Mitchel (born 1975), New Zealand actress
- Tyler Pierce (disambiguation), Multiple people
- Tyler Reid (disambiguation), Multiple people
- Tyler Smith (disambiguation), Multiple people
- Tyler Toland (born 2001), Irish professional footballer
- Tyler Tumminia (born 1979), American sports executive and commissioner
- Tyler Wright (surfer) (born 1994), American professional surfer

== Fictional characters ==
=== Given name ===
- Tyler, a contestant from the Total Drama series
- Tyler, a character from the horror comic series Witch Creek Road
- Tyler, a boy from the American-Canadian TV series Pinky Dinky Doo
- Tyler Barrol, a character from the American soap opera Revenge
- Tyler Bowman, from the Canadian animated TV series Supernoobs
- Tyler Brennan, from the Australian soap opera Neighbours
- Tyler Brennen, from the TV series Burn Notice
- Tyler Churchill, from the Australian soap opera Home and Away
- Tyler Blu Gunderson, a blue Spix's macaw from Rio and its 2014 sequel, Rio 2
- Tyler Crowley, from Stephenie Meyer's book Twilight
- Tyler Cutebiker, from the animated TV series Gravity Falls
- Tyler Dayspring, a character from comic books produced by Marvel
- Tyler Down, a character in the novel and Netflix series 13 Reasons Why
- Tyler Downing, a character from the television series The 4400
- Tyler Durden, from the novel Fight Club and the film adaptation
- Tyler James, from the TV series Dog with a Blog
- Tyler Kennedy "TK" Strand, 9-1-1: Lone Star character
- Tyler King, from the Highlander TV and film series
- Tyler Leander, from the 2014 novel Station Eleven by Emily St. John Mandel
- Tyler Lockwood, from the TV series Vampire Diaries
- Tyler McCandless, from the American soap opera Capitol
- Tyler Michaelson, from the American soap opera The Young and the Restless
- Tyler Moon, from the British soap opera EastEnders
- Tyler Nguyen-Baker, a character from the 2022 animated film Turning Red
- Tyler Plummer, from the 2005 film The Pacifier
- Tyler Ronan, from the video game Tell Me Why (video game)
- Tyler Sparks, from That's So Suite Life of Hannah Montana
- Tyler Steele, from the TV series VR Troopers
- Tyler Stone (Marvel Comics), from the comics imprint Marvel 2099

=== Surname ===
- Darcy Tyler, from the Australian soap opera Neighbours
- Jamie Tyler, an American boy with mind control powers from Anthony Horowitz's Power of Five series
- Three superheroes appearing in DC Comics:
  - Rex Tyler, the Golden Age Hourman
  - Rick Tyler, his son and the second Hourman
  - Matthew Tyler, the third Hourman, an android appearing in DC One Million
- Isabelle Tyler, from the American science fiction drama series The 4400
- Rose Tyler, from the British science fiction television series Doctor Who
  - Jackie Tyler, Rose's mother
  - Pete Tyler, Rose's father
- Sam Tyler, from the British science fiction television series Life on Mars and its American adaptation
- Ron Tyler, a main character in Child's Play 3
- Vince Tyler, from the British television series Queer As Folk

== See also ==
- Taylor (disambiguation)
- Tylor (disambiguation)
- Justice Tyler (disambiguation)
