= Tyler =

Tyler may refer to:

== People and fictional characters ==
- Tyler (name), an English name; with lists of people with the surname or given name

== Places ==
=== United States ===
- Tyler, California
  - Tyler, California, the former name of Cherokee, Nevada County, California
- Tyler, Florida
- Tyler, Minnesota
- Tyler, Missouri
- Tyler, Texas, the largest US city named Tyler
- Tyler, Washington
- Tyler County, Texas
- Tyler County, West Virginia
- Tyler Hill, Pennsylvania
- Tyler Park, Louisville, Kentucky, a neighborhood
- Tylertown, Mississippi

==== State Parks ====
- Tyler State Park (Pennsylvania)
- Tyler State Park (Texas)

=== United Kingdom ===
- Tyler Hill, Kent
- Tylers Green, Buckinghamshire

== Ships ==
- HMS Tyler (K576), a British frigate in service in the Royal Navy from 1944 to 1945
- USS Tyler (1857), an American Civil War gunboat

== Other uses ==
- Tyler (Masonic), the outer guard or door-keeper of a Masonic lodge
- Tyler (65 nm SOI), the version codename for AMD's Turion 64 X2
- Tyler, New Hampshire, a fictional town depicted in the novels Black Tide, Dead Sand, and others by Brendan DuBois
- Tyler Block, a three-story building in Louisville, Kentucky
- Tyler mesh size (see Mesh (scale)), a unit for the opening size of sieves
- Tyler Technologies, a United States public sector company
- University of Texas at Tyler, in Tyler, Texas
- Tyler (film), a Canadian television film
- Tyler, a song by UB40 about Gary Tyler

== See also ==
- Tiler (surname)
