= 2011 World Youth Championships in Athletics – Boys' shot put =

Boys' shot put at the 2011 World Youth Championships in Athletics
- Venue: Stadium Lille Métropole
- Dates: 7 July (qualification & final)
- Competitors: 31
- Winning distance: 24.35 WYB

Medalists
gold medal	Jacko Gill	New Zealand
silver medal	Tyler Schultz	United States
bronze medal	Braheme Days	United States

The boys' shot put at the 2011 World Youth Championships in Athletics was held at the Stadium Lille Métropole on 7 July.

== Medalists ==
Gold	Silver	Bronze
Jacko Gill; New Zealand	Tyler Schultz; United States	Braheme Days; United States

== Records ==
Prior to the competition, the following records were as follows.

World Youth Best	Jacko Gill (NZL)	23.86	Hastings, New Zealand	11 December 2010
Championship Record	Ryan Crouser (USA)	21.56	Bressanone, Italy	11 July 2009
World Youth Leading	Jacko Gill (NZL)	21.40	Nouméa, New Caledonia	7 May 2011

== Qualification ==
Qualification rule: qualification standard 19.20 m or at least best 12 qualified.

=== Group A ===
Rank	Name	Nationality	#1	#2	#3	Result	Notes
1	Tyler Schultz	United States	18.94	19.70		19.70	Q
2	Vladislav Chernikov	Ukraine	18.25	18.14	19.32	19.32	Q
3	Ruan Combrinck	South Africa	17.85	19.18	x	19.18	q
4	Andrzej Regin	Poland	16.70	18.48	18.36	18.48	q
5	Andrey Retunskiy	Uzbekistan	17.43	18.28	18.27	18.28	
6	Viktor Gardenkrans	Sweden	17.75	18.22	17.80	18.22	
7	Christoffer Mikkelsen	Denmark	x	18.13	x	18.13	PB
8	Navtejdeep Singh	India	18.06	17.96	x	18.06	
9	Tibor Rakovszky	Hungary	x	17.85	17.53	17.85	
10	Brandon Deslauriers	Canada	16.61	17.28	17.82	17.82	
11	Matti Sivonen	Finland	17.37	17.23	x	17.37	
12	Wong Kai Yuen	Singapore	16.77	16.72	x	16.77	
13	Alexandru Rohian	Romania	16.70	x	16.37	16.70	
14	Paulius Žabinskas	Lithuania	x	x	16.66	16.66	
15	Kristian Periš	Croatia	x	16.55	x	16.55	
	Fedrick Dacres	Jamaica				DNS	

=== Group B ===
Rank	Name	Nationality	#1	#2	#3	Result	Notes
1	Jacko Gill	New Zealand	20.75			20.75	Q
2	Braheme Days	United States	20.06			20.06	Q, PB
3	Patryk Ocypa	Poland	x	16.35	19.84	19.84	Q, PB
4	Hezekiel Romeo	Trinidad and Tobago	17.93	17.83	19.68	19.68	Q, PB
5	Aleksey Chizhelikov	Russia	19.42			19.42	Q
6	Gregori Ott	Switzerland	17.85	19.10	18.22	19.10	q
7	Gian Ragonesi	Peru	16.89	19.00	18.66	19.00	q, PB
8	Mesud Pezer	Bosnia and Herzegovina	18.73	x	x	18.73	q
9	Lorenzo Del Gatto	Italy	17.81	x	17.05	17.81	
10	Dmytro Ostrovskiy	Ukraine	x	x	17.25	17.25	
11	Florentin Stoenescu	Romania	17.19	x	x	17.19	
12	Ahmed Hassan	Egypt	16.86	17.14	x	17.14	
13	Nelson Fernandes	Brazil	x	14.09	17.05	17.05	
14	Tomaš Đurović	Montenegro	x	16.29	16.50	16.50	
15	Willy Vicaut	France	x	16.42	x	16.42	

== Final ==
Rank	Name	Nationality	#1	#2	#3	#4	#5	#6	Result	Notes
1st place, gold medalist(s)	Jacko Gill	New Zealand	22.89	24.35	24.03	23.54	21.99	24.02	24.35	WYB
2nd place, silver medalist(s)	Tyler Schultz	United States	x	19.46	20.35	x	20.18	x	20.35	PB
3rd place, bronze medalist(s)	Braheme Days	United States	18.78	19.48	19.80	19.27	x	20.14	20.14	PB
4	Patryk Ocypa	Poland	20.08	x	18.82	x	x	19.18	20.08	PB
5	Andrzej Regin	Poland	17.88	x	18.88	19.33	19.88	19.55	19.88	PB
6	Mesud Pezer	Bosnia and Herzegovina	19.79	19.62	19.54	x	19.66	x	19.79	
7	Aleksey Chizhelikov	Russia	19.12	18.86	19.61	19.13	19.20	19.57	19.61	PB
8	Vladislav Chernikov	Ukraine	19.60	x	x	19.24	19.59	19.08	19.60	
9	Hezekiel Romeo	Trinidad and Tobago	18.62	18.45	17.98				18.62	
10	Gregori Ott	Switzerland	18.39	x	18.60				18.60	
11	Ruan Combrinck	South Africa	x	18.11	x				18.11	
12	Gian Ragonesi	Peru	17.70	x	x				17.70	
