= Tyler Hill =

Tyler Hill may refer to:

- Tyler Hill, Kent, a village in Kent, England
- Tyler Hill, Pennsylvania, an unincorporated community in Wayne County, Pennsylvania, United States
- Tyler Hill (racing driver) (born 1994), American stock car racing driver
- Tyler Edward Hill (1883–1932), leader in black politics in West Virginia
