= Tailor (disambiguation) =

A tailor is a person who makes, repairs, or alters clothing professionally.

Tailor may also refer to:

- Bluefish (Pomatomus saltatrix), also known as tailors
- The Tailor, or Scissorman, a bogeyman character from Heinrich Hoffman's Struwwelpeter
- The Tailor (Moroni), a painting by Giovanni Battista Moroni; late Renaissance period
- The Tailor (film), a 2017 Vietnamese drama film
- TRV Tailor, Australian Torpedo Recovery Vessel
- The Tailor (TV series), Turkish television series
- Tailor (surname)

== See also ==
- Taylor (disambiguation)
