= President Taylor =

President Taylor may refer to:

- Zachary Taylor (1784–1850), 12th president of the United States
- Charles Taylor (Liberian politician) (born 1948), 22nd president of Liberia

== Other uses ==
- SS President Taylor, named for the 12th president of the United States

== See also ==
- Taylor (disambiguation)
