= Tylor =

Tylor is an English surname and given name meaning “tiler”.

== Surname ==
- Charles Tylor (1816–1902), British minister and author
- Edward Burnett Tylor (1832–1917), British anthropologist
- Jud Tylor (born 1979), Canadian actress
- Theodore Tylor (1900–1968), British lawyer and international level chess player

== Given name ==
- Tylor Chase (born 1989), American actor and YouTuber
- Tylor Megill (born 1995), American baseball player
- Tylor Perry (born 2001), American basketball player

== Fictional characters ==
- Lt. Commander Justy Ueki Tylor, a fictional character in the series The Irresponsible Captain Tylor

== See also ==
- Tyler (disambiguation)
- Taylor (disambiguation)
