= Tyler Moore =

Tyler Moore may refer to:

- Tyler Moore (baseball) (born 1987), American baseball player
- Tyler Moore (American football) (born 1993), American football player
- Tyler Moore (powerlifter) (born 1993), American powerlifter
- Tyler Jacob Moore (born 1982), American actor
- Ty Moore (politician), member of the Ohio House of Representatives
- Tyler Moore (sailor), sailor who won gold in the 1999 Farr 30 World Championship

== See also ==
- Mary Tyler Moore (1936–2017), American actress
