= Judge Tyler =

Judge Tyler may refer to:

- David Gardiner Tyler (1846–1927), judge of the Virginia Circuit Court
- Harold R. Tyler Jr. (1922–2005), judge of the United States District Court for the Southern District of New York
- John Tyler Sr. (1747–1813), judge of the United States District Court for the District of Virginia

== See also ==
- Justice Tyler (disambiguation)
