= Matt Gulbin =

American football player (born 2002)

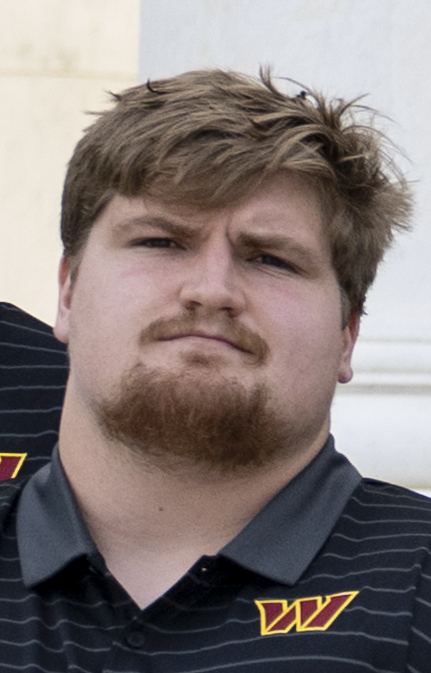
- Gulbin with the Washington Commanders in 2026

No. 66 – Washington Commanders
- Position: Center
- Roster status: Active

Personal information
- Born: October 27, 2002 (age 24)
- Listed height: 6 ft 4 in (1.93 m)
- Listed weight: 312 lb (142 kg)

Career information
- High school: Wilton (Wilton, Connecticut)
- College: Wake Forest (2021–2024); Michigan State (2025)
- NFL draft: 2026: 6th round, 209th overall pick

Career history
- Washington Commanders (2026–present)
- Stats at Pro Football Reference

Matthew Gulbin (born October 27, 2002) is an American professional football center for the Washington Commanders of the National Football League (NFL). Gulbin played college football for the Wake Forest Demon Deacons and Michigan State Spartans and was selected by the Commanders in the sixth round of the 2026 NFL draft.

== Early life ==
Gulbin was born on October 27, 2002, and grew up in Fairfield County, Connecticut. He attended Wilton High School located in Wilton, Connecticut. Coming out of high school, he was rated as a three-star recruit, where he committed to play college football for the Wake Forest Demon Deacons, after earning all-State honors.

== College career ==
=== Wake Forest ===
During his time as a Demon Deacon from 2021 through 2024, Gulbin appeared in 41 games with 23 starts primarily at offensive guard, where for his performance in 2024 he earned honorable mention all-ACC honors. After the conclusion of the 2024 season, he decided to enter his name into the NCAA transfer portal.

=== Michigan State ===
Gulbin transferred to play for the Michigan State Spartans. Heading into the season, he was named the team's starting center, while also being named to the Rimington Award Watch List. Gulbin was also named one of the Spartans team captains. He started the first 11 games at center in his lone season at Michigan State, missing the final game due to injury, and was named Honorable Mention All-Big Ten. In his five-year college career, Gulbin played in 52 games, starting 22 games at guard and 12 at center.

== Professional career ==
Pre-draft measurables
Height	Weight	Arm length	Hand span	Wingspan	20-yard shuttle	Three-cone drill	Vertical jump	Broad jump	Bench press
6 ft 3 5/8 in (1.92 m)	305 lb (138 kg)	31 3/4 in (0.81 m)	9 1/2 in (0.24 m)	6 ft 6 1/4 in (1.99 m)	4.96 s	8.33 s	28.0 in (0.71 m)	8 ft 5 in (2.57 m)	21 reps
All values from NFL Combine/Pro Day

Gulbin was selected by the Washington Commanders in the sixth round with the 209th overall pick of the 2026 NFL draft, signing his four-year rookie contract on May 8, 2026.
