= George Tyler =

George Tyler may refer to:

- George Tyler (Royal Navy officer) (1792–1862), British Royal Navy officer, colonial governor, Conservative MP
- Sir George Tyler, 1st Baronet (1835–1897), Lord Mayor of London 1893–94
- George C. Tyler (1867-1946), American theatrical producer and talent manager
- Lefty Tyler (1889–1953), born George Albert Tyler, American professional baseball pitcher 1910–21
- George Tyler (rugby union) (1879–1942), New Zealand rugby union player
- George Tyler (cricketer) (1898–1976), English cricketer
