= Judge Taylor =

Judge Taylor may refer to:

- Alan Taylor (British judge) (born 1939), Circuit Judge on the Midland Circuit
- Anna Diggs Taylor (1932–2017), judge of the United States District Court for the Eastern District of Michigan
- Chris Taylor (judge) (born 1968), judge of the Wisconsin Court of Appeals
- Fredrick Monroe Taylor (1901–1988), judge of the United States District Court for the District of Idaho
- Gary L. Taylor (born 1938), judge of the United States District Court for the Central District of California
- George Caldwell Taylor (1885–1952), judge of the United States District Court for the Eastern District of Tennessee
- George Keith Taylor (1769–1815), judge of the United States Circuit Court for the Fourth Circuit
- Robert Love Taylor (judge) (1899–1987), judge of the United States District Court for the Eastern District of Tennessee
- Robert Walker Tayler (1852–1910), judge of the United States District Court for the Northern District of Ohio
- William McLaughlin Taylor Jr. (1909–1985), judge of the United States District Court for the Northern District of Texas

== See also ==
- Justice Taylor (disambiguation)
