= James Tyler =

James Tyler may refer to:

- James Tyler (bobsleigh) (born 1960), American Olympic bobsledder
- James Tyler (musician) (1940–2010), American lutenist and early music researcher
- James Endell Tyler (1789–1851), Anglican minister, historian and theologian
- James Hoge Tyler (1846–1925), American politician and governor of Virginia
- James Hoge Tyler III (1910–1988), his grandson, American attorney and member of the Virginia Senate
- James Manning Tyler (1835–1926), United States Representative from Vermont
- James Michael Tyler (1962–2021), American actor
- James Tyler Guitars, electric guitar manufacturer in California

== See also ==
- Tyler James (disambiguation)
