= Wilton High School =

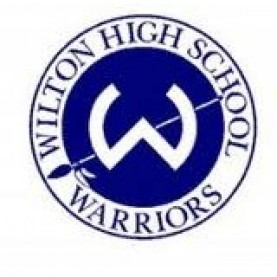

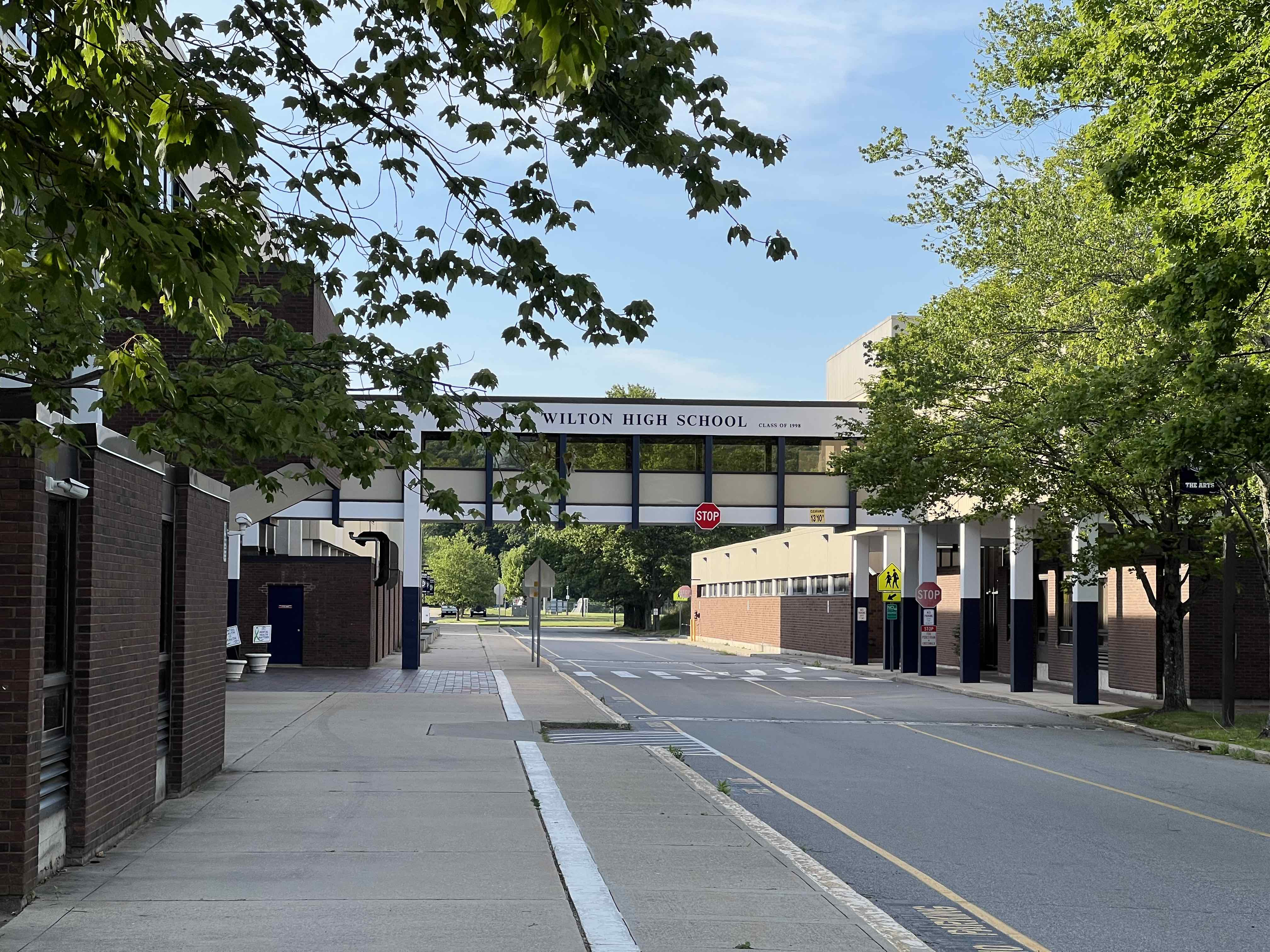

Location
- 395 Danbury Road; Wilton, Connecticut 06897-2006; United States; 41°12′39″N 73°25′59″W

Information
- Type: Public high school
- Established: September 1971 (55 years ago)
- School district: Wilton Public Schools
- Superintendent: Kevin J Smith
- CEEB code: 070938
- Principal: Robert O'Donnell
- Teaching staff: 99.00 (FTE)
- Grades: 9–12
- Gender: Coeducational
- Enrollment: 1,244 (2023–2024)
- Student to teacher ratio: 12.57
- Schedule: 08:20AM to 02:55PM ET
- Colors: Blue and White
- Athletics conference: FCIAC, CIAC
- Nickname: Warriors
- Website: whs.wiltonps.org

Wilton High School is a public high school in Wilton, Connecticut, U.S., considered "one of Connecticut's top performers" in various measures of school success in 2007, including scores on standardized mathematics and reading tests. In 2016, U.S. News & World Report ranked Wilton as the 7th best public high school in Connecticut and 386th in the United States.

The school's present, permanent location did not open until 1971. Since then, the school has experienced rapid population growth. From the height of the 1970s to 2006, the student body grew by 7.5 times. In fall 2001, a major multimillion-dollar construction project was completed, significantly expanding the square footage of the school. Enrollment increased by 29 percent from 2001 to 2006.

The school's current principal is Robert O'Donnell, who in 2011 replaced long-time-principal Timothy H. Canty, himself a Wilton graduate. Canty was involved in several high-profile free speech disputes with students before transferring to the Board of Education for two years and then announcing his departure from the school district in 2013.

== Demographics ==
The demographics of the school are unusual for Connecticut. Historically, compared to other high schools in the state, the student body of Wilton High School has been more affluent and substantially Caucasian:

Ethnicity/economic status indicator	Year	Wilton
Eligible for free/reduced price meals	2005-06	0.9%
Eligible for free/reduced price meals	2002-03	0.6%
Juniors, Seniors working 16+ hrs./week	2005-06	N/A
Juniors, Seniors working 16+ hrs./week	2000-01	15.8%
K-12 students, non-English home language	2005-06	4.7%
White	2004-05	92.7%
Hispanic	2004-05	1.9%
African American	2004-05	1.3%
Asian American	2004-05	4.0%
American Indian	2004-05	0.1%

The most recent statistics published by the state for the student population of the high school for the academic year 2023–24

Population group	Count
Eligible for free/ reduced price meals	N/A
Two or More Races	76
White	931
Hispanic or Latino	85
Black or African American	15
Asian	134
American Indian or Alaskan Native	0
Native Hawaiian/Pacific Islander	1

== History of secondary education in town ==
=== Before 1959 ===
Even though Wilton became an independent town in 1802, separating from Norwalk, its education system was highly unorganized until the late 1950s.

In the early and mid-20th century, Wilton students went to high schools in Westport, New Canaan, Norwalk (until 1930), Danbury and Ridgefield. Since the schools in these communities were becoming overcrowded with population growth, a regional high school for Wilton was proposed in 1935 but was vetoed by the state governor. In the following year, Wilton, Weston and Redding began a joint study, which rejected the idea again. Instead, the committee recommended that Wilton wait for population to increase enough to support a high school and, in the meantime, buy enough land for the school. In 1940, a town meeting approved the purchase of the Harbs Farm property, a 65-acre (260,000 m^{2}) tract near the intersection of School and Danbury Roads. In 1944, a regional high school was proposed again and again the idea was rejected, this time by the town of Redding, which killed the proposal. A consultant hired by Wilton town officials recommended in 1948 that town population growth could support a high school in less than a decade. The regional high school idea was then permanently dropped.

Before the 1959 academic year, all students seeking public secondary school education had to attend Staples High School in Westport. In 1951, Westport officials, facing their own town's population growth, notified Wilton that it should prepare to remove its high school students from that town's school by 1957. In 1956, 10th-grade students began attending classes in the Wilton Junior High School building and 11th-grade students joined them there in fall 1957, so that only Wilton's seniors were at the Westport high school. In that final school year for Wilton students in Westport, the top two graduating seniors at Staples High School were from Wilton. A $1.2 million wing was completed for the junior high school building in fall 1958.

=== High School shuffle (1959-1971) ===
In 1962, the public secondary education building moved again. This time, the destination was a brand new structure currently known as Middlebrook School. The first graduating class of this new high school, the class of 1963, numbered 170. Overall enrollment that year was 615. Although this was a new facility, it was quickly deemed inappropriate due to its small size, in the wake of the "baby boomer" education era.

In 1966, a building committee was created to expand the new high school building, but the group recommended that the town instead buy land to the northwest of the high school building and in 1967, the town approved the idea. The land was condemned but the property owners appealed to the courts, delaying the project. Temporary classrooms were set up outside the old high school building. The town approved $12.6 million for the building and the new structure was built to hold 1,500 students, with the possibility of expansion to hold 2,000.

The present day Wilton High School opened in September 1971, reaching a maximum student population of 1,646 during the 1976-77 academic year. WHS has graduated nearly 12,500 students up to the 2006-07 academic year.

=== Recent history ===
==== A Better Chance ====
Starting in 1996, Wilton High School participated in the A Better Chance (formerly called ABC) program, which brought minority students from inner-city schools to live in town and attend the school. From 2004, A Better Chance leased the former Goslee House at 6 Godfrey Place from the town library for student housing.

==== Later construction ====
In 2001, two extensive additions to the school were completed, as well as other renovations. The project included new classrooms, more modern science laboratories, new music rooms, a larger cafeteria and a new theater building with an 800-seat auditorium.

== Controversies ==
=== Treatment of special needs students ===
In 2007, the state of Connecticut enacted legislation preventing physical restraint or seclusion of students in special education, except in limited situations, largely as a result of allegations of mistreatment of four special education students in Wilton High School and other Wilton schools in 2005. Jill Ely claimed that, without notifying her, the school forced her intellectually disabled son into a room at the high school that was held shut until he became completely quiet. She said that her son injured his arm trying to get out and once, she later learned, "he was left crying and whimpering for almost the entire day." An investigation by the Wilton Bulletin in 2006 found that the high school "safe room" had never been inspected by the fire marshal and lacked a Building Department certificate of occupancy. Maryanne Lombardi made similar claims that her 9-year old autistic son, who did not speak, was routinely sent to a "padded cell called the timeout room" at another Wilton school. Gloria Bass, the grandmother of two students in special education, also said that one child had been restrained for months in a storage closet without her knowledge. Superintendent Gary Richards defended the schools’ actions, saying, "We do the best we can with kids who sometimes are very challenged."

=== Free speech ===
In March 2007, a controversy arose that achieved national prominence when the principal, Timothy Canty, on the objection of a student, cancelled an original student play by an advanced theater class concerning the Iraq War, a project he had originally approved. He justified his action by claiming it might hurt Wilton families "who had lost loved ones or who had individuals serving as we speak," and that there was not enough classroom and rehearsal time to ensure it would provide "a legitimate instructional experience for our students." The play, Voices in Conflict, had been written and produced by students under the direction of Bonnie Dickinson, a Theatre teacher with 13 years' experience. It was supposed to have been performed in school during the day. School officials, including Superintendent Gary Richards, notwithstanding national attention over the cancellation and a letter protesting signed by Stephen Sondheim, Edward Albee, Christopher Durang, John Guare and John Patrick Shanley, refused to allow the production to be performed at the school.

Theater groups rallied to the students' defense and the play was subsequently performed at the Fairfield Theatre Company, The Vineyard Theatre, The Culture Project and The Public Theater. The play was produced for Connecticut Public Television and Dickinson became the official 2007 Honoree of the National Coalition Against Censorship and the winner of the Connecticut Center for First Amendment Rights' 2007 "Freedom Award."

=== Cell phone ban ===
For the 2024-25 school year, Wilton Public Schools introduced a cell phone ban throughout the entire school day from 8:20 AM to 2:55 PM after US Surgeon General Vivek Murthy issued an advisory warning on the effect of social media on young people and in line with many other school districts across the United States. In addition, Yondr pouches were to be distributed to all students to store their phones, expecting the pouches to remove the need for teachers to police phones. Superintendent Kevin J. Smith advertised the ban as made to remove distractions in classrooms, promote face-to-face interaction between students, improve mental health, and decrease cyberbullying and other disruptive online behavior. The previous phone policy authorized teachers to institute phone caddies for class, or to turn over phones to the school's front office for the duration of the day.

During its introductory and voting stages, the ban drew negative feedback from a number of students, parents, and two of six Wilton Board of Education members. Opposing parents criticized the ban on its merits, citing concerns related to reasonable use of phones during the day, the schools apparent lack of trust in students, and the potential need for students to have access to cell phones during emergencies. The two Board of Education members found fault in its adoption procedurally, with member Heather Priest citing concerns over funding the distribution of the Yondr pouches. She criticized Smith's plan to pay for the pouches with $80,000 of "unexpended funds" from the 2023-2024 fiscal budget as a potential misappropriation of both budget funds and discretionary administrative power, as the Board of Education had taken budget cuts for the 2024-2025 fiscal year and had not voted on the expenditure prior to its completion. Member Nicola Davies suggested an alternative pilot program in Wilton's middle school.

Smith continued to support the new policy citing a survey of WHS teaching staff, a majority of whom had criticized the previous cell phone policy as ineffective. The survey also demonstrated a majority sentiment among teachers that cell phones were causing "a decrease in academic performance". Though the survey demonstrated more evenly split results among parents and highly opposite results from students, the ban retained strong support from WHS administrators and staff, and was approved unanimously by the Board of Education in a 6-0 vote on October 10, 2024, despite continued dissatisfaction from two members.

The ban prompted controversy and backlash among students, especially over its goal to increase social interaction between students. Lila Hidalgo, a writer in the school's newspaper The Forum, noted that while banning cell phones throughout the entire school day would be an easy way to stop phone use, a total ban would not be the complete solution. Students in favor of the phone ban believe the ban would reduce dependency on phones, while some students who opposed the ban believed the ban was made as a punishment to students by limiting access to devices during breaks in the school day. Student opposition to the ban was mostly concerned with the "unrealistic" standards made by the school, not the belief that cell phone use disrupts learning. Hidalgo argued that because WHS expects students to act responsibly in high school, students should have the right to use their phones between classes, during breaks and at lunch. WHS administration disagreed with this, citing the need for student face-to-face interaction. The counter-argument has also been criticized by students as an attempt to control students' relationships. One student, while commenting on the ban's goal on increasing social interaction, said "You can't force people to be friends. It has to be natural. In the real world, you don't need to like everybody."

== Sports ==
=== Boys' lacrosse ===
Since the sport gained school-sponsorship, the team has won 21 Connecticut state championships and 13 FCIAC titles. In 2011, they were ranked 64th in the nation by LaxPower.

=== Girls' lacrosse ===
The girls' lacrosse team won 13 FCIAC titles in 15 years, as well as several state championships, the first of which in 2001 over rival Darien.

== Notable alumni ==
- Nico Benalcazar - professional soccer player
- Jeremy Black – actor, best known for his role in The Boys from Brazil
- Darius Brubeck - jazz musician
- Paul Dano – actor best known for his roles in The Girl Next Door, Little Miss Sunshine, There Will Be Blood and, The Batman
- Matt Gulbin – NFL center for the Washington Commanders
- Lydia Hearst-Shaw – model, heiress, socialite and daughter of Patty Hearst
- Sam Hyde – comedian, writer and actor
- Daniel Kellogg – American composer
- Tyler LeVander – session drummer, composer and producer
- Kristine Lilly – 1999 FIFA Women's World Cup champion and two-time Olympic gold medalist for the United States women's national soccer team; most capped player in international soccer history (men's or women's); the high school's north field is named after her
- Katherine Maher - CEO of NPR
- Buffy Neuffer – journalist for the Boston Globe
- Mike Pressler – lacrosse coach
- Simon Rosenberg (class of 1981) – founder and president of New Democrat Network, a think tank
- John Scofield – jazz guitarist, attended the school in the late 1960s
- Frank Sesno – CNN journalist and professor of media and public affairs at The George Washington University
- Dan Shevchik – 1999 Pan American games Bronze Medalist
- Brit & Alex Smith – models, recording artists, and child actors who appeared at the age of three in the soap opera One Life to Live
- Craig S. Smith – New York Times foreign correspondent
- Zachary Cole Smith – frontman of DIIV
- Carter Vail – content creator and musician
- Donald Verrilli – United States Solicitor General.
- Emily Weiss – founder of the cosmetics company Glossier and the blog Into the Gloss
- Boris Zemelman - neuroscientist
- Rick Mitarotonda – musician in Goose (American Band)
