= Simon Rosenberg =

Democratic political strategist and blogger (born 1963)

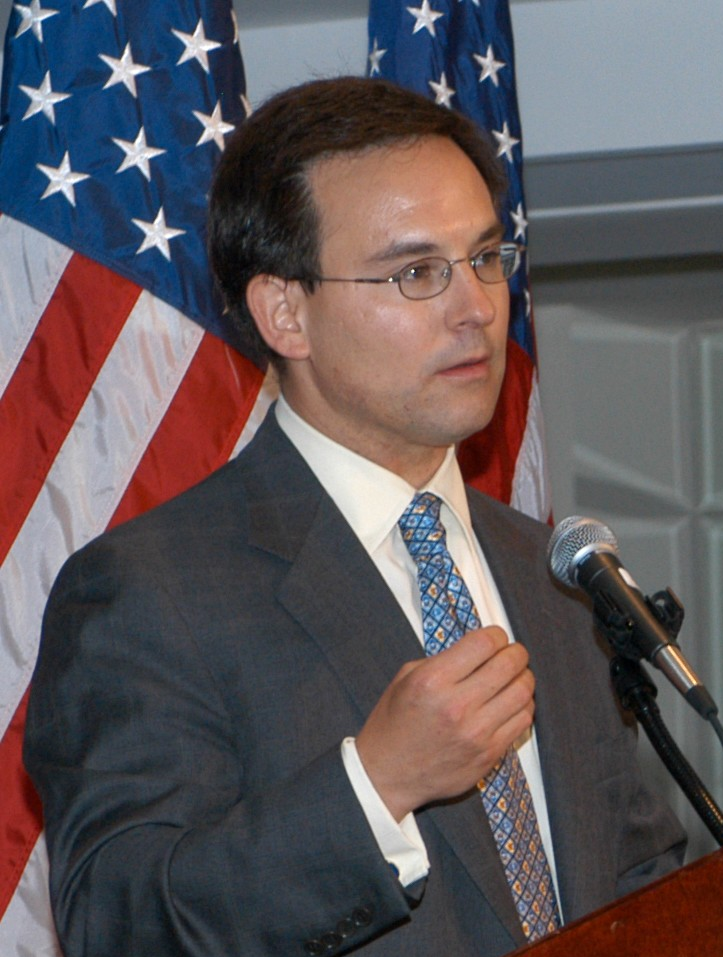
- Rosenberg in 2005
- Born: October 23, 1963 (age 62); New York City, U.S.
- Education: Tufts University (BA)

Simon Rosenberg (born October 23, 1963) is a Democratic political strategist and blogger. He was the founder of New Democrat Network (NDN), a centrist think tank and advocacy group based in Washington, D.C. Rosenberg shuttered NDN in March 2024.

According to the 2002 book How to Hack a Party Line: The Democrats and Silicon Valley, Rosenberg and NDN were instrumental in shifting control of the Democratic Party away from labor unions and toward Silicon Valley businesses. Rosenberg said in 1999, "Our problem as a party is that the biggest source of our venture capital now comes from labor, which is a group that's becoming less and less important, and representing less and less of a percentage of American voters. ... We have to replace labor's investment in the party with investment from another source, and hopefully from a source that's growing."

== Background ==
Rosenberg was born on October 23, 1963, in New York City to Peter and Louise Rosenberg. He attended the Walden School (New York City) and then public schools in Wilton, Connecticut. He is a 1981 graduate of Wilton High School, and a 1985 graduate of Tufts University. In 1985, Rosenberg moved to New York City to work for ABC News, where he spent two years before joining the Dukakis for President Campaign in Des Moines, Iowa. He co-founded the New Democrat Network in 1996. He dissolved the organization in 2024.

== Analysis of 2024 presidential election ==
In 2024, Rosenberg posited that Republican organizations were "flooding the zone" with biased opinion polls showing Donald Trump leading; Rosenberg asserted that Trump actually was not. In October, Rosenberg said that twelve of the last fifteen presidential polls in Pennsylvania — a crucial battleground state — were produced by organizations with conservative or Republican affiliations. He asserted this phenomenon was spreading to all seven battleground states, and argued that its intent was to game the polling averages in Trump's favor. Rosenberg claimed the purpose was to bolster the confidence of the Trump base, while demoralizing the base of his opponent, Kamala Harris. He also argued that the purpose included providing an argument to claim the election had been stolen from Trump should he lose. Rosenberg pointed to a similar phenomenon in the 2022 midterm elections, which created an expectation of a Republican red wave election that did not materialize. He said the 2024 effort was much larger and included new participants, such as the Polymarket online betting market, and Elon Musk. In October, Polymarket showed a $30 million spike in wagers on Trump, pushing his odds of winning the election to 60%. The wagers were placed by one bettor.
