= Lacey Hull =

American politician (born 1986)

Member of the Texas House of Representatives from the 138th district
- In office January 12, 2021 – January 12, 2027
- Preceded by: Dwayne Bohac
- Succeeded by: Tyler Smith (elect)

Personal details
- Born: August 21, 1986 (age 40) Houston, Texas, U.S.
- Party: Republican
- Spouse: Trevor Hull (m. 2010; div. 2021)
- Children: 1
- Education: University of Houston (BS)

Lacey Morgan Hull (born August 21, 1986) is an American politician serving as a member of the Texas House of Representatives from the 138th district. Hull was first elected in November 2020 and assumed office in January 2021.

Despite Hull's entrance into the House being controversial after numerous accusations that she was involved in two romantic relationships with a fellow representative and a political consultant, she has been noted to have rebound as having a relatively effective bi-partisan tenure, even securing the Vice Chairmanship of the GOP Caucus.

On November 3, 2026, Democratic candidate Tyler Smith defeated Hull by a vote of 52%-48%, and Hull conceded via social media.

== Background ==
Hull was born in Houston. She earned a Bachelor of Science degree in political science and history from the University of Houston. She served on her neighborhood homeowner association (HOA) and was a precinct chair for the Harris County Republican Party before being elected.

Texas House of Representatives
Preceded by Dwayne Bohac	Member of the Texas House of Representatives from the 138th district 2021–present	Incumbent
