= Tyler Smith =

Tyler Smith may refer to:

- Tyler Smith (American football) (born 2001), American football player
- Tyler Smith (baseball) (born 1991), American baseball player
- Tyler Smith (basketball, born 1986), American basketball player
- Tyler Smith (basketball, born 2004), American basketball player
- Tyler Smith (curler) (born 1998), Canadian curler
- Tyler Smith (footballer) (born 1998), English footballer
- Tyler Smith (musician) (born 1986), American musician
- Tyler Smith (Georgia politician) (born 1990), member of the Georgia House of Representatives
- Tyler Smith (Texas politician), member of the Texas House of Representatives
- Tyler Smith (triathlete) (born 1998), Bermudan triathlete
- Tyler Jo Smith (born 1967), archaeologist, academic, and author
- Tyler Smith (Neighbours), character on the Australian soap opera Neighbours
