= Boris Zemelman =

American neuroscientist (born 1967)

Boris Valery Zemelman (born September 10, 1967) is an American neuroscientist and one of the pioneers of optogenetics.

== Personal life ==
Boris Zemelman, at the age of ten, immigrated to the United States with his parents Valery and Evelina Zemelman, and lived in Wilton, Connecticut. He graduated from Wilton High School, and for his excellent academic performance was awarded Charles G. Mortimer Scholarships.

He studied biochemistry at Stanford University, where he received his Doctorate with a dissertation on purification and characterization of a novel mammalian recombinase under professor I. Robert Lehman.

He is now an associate professor of neuroscience at The Center for Learning and Memory at the University of Texas at Austin. In the past, he was a guest researcher at the Dudman Lab at The Janelia Farm Research Campus Howard Hughes Medical Institute (HHMI).

== Research ==
After completing his dissertation, Zemelman began working in the laboratory of James Rothman on SNARE proteins and their influence on the intracellular membrane fusion.

Subsequently, Zemelman worked jointly with Gero Miesenböck to perform seminal experiments in 2002 and 2003 on selective stimulation of neurons using light, a field that came to be known as optogenetics. These techniques were later improved by Karl Deisseroth in 2005; these pioneering studies in optogenetics led to these three scientists being regarded as candidates for the Nobel Prize in 2013.

In 2015 Zemelman and his colleagues received three grants totaling $4 million, to develop techniques for imaging and manipulating the activity of neurons in the brain. The grants were made through Barack Obama's Brain Research through Advancing Innovative Neurotechnologies (BRAIN) initiative launched in 2014.
