= Tyler James =

Tyler James may refer to:

- Tyler James (American musician) (born 1982), American singer-songwriter
- Tyler James (English musician) (born 1985), English singer-songwriter

== See also ==
- James Tyler (disambiguation)
- Tyler James Williams (born 1992), American actor and musician
- Tyler James Robinson, suspected killer of Charlie Kirk
