= Tyler Randell =

Tyler Randell may refer to:

- Tyler Randell (rugby league)
- Tyler Randell (ice hockey)
