= Tyler Smith (Texas politician) =

American politician

Member-elect of the Texas House of Representatives from the 138th district
- Assuming office January 2027
- Succeeding: Lacey Hull

Personal details
- Party: Democratic

Tyler Smith is an American politician. A member of the Democratic Party, he is the member-elect for the 138th district of the Texas House of Representatives.

Smith was born in Houston and grew up in Los Angeles before returning to Houston to attend Texas Southern University.
