= Tyler, California =

Tyler
- Former settlement
- Location in California
- Coordinates: 37°03′24″N 120°18′53″W
- Country: United States
- State: California
- County: Madera
- Elevation: 200 ft (60 m)

Tyler is a former settlement in Madera County, California, United States. It was located on the Chowchilla Pacific Railroad, 5 miles (8 km) south-southwest of Chowchilla, at an elevation of 197 feet (60 m). Tyler still appeared on maps as of 1918.
