= Tyler Sanders (disambiguation) =

Tyler Sanders (2004–2022) was an American actor.

Tyler Sanders may also refer to:

- Tyler Sanders or TJ Sanders (born 1991), Canadian volleyball player
- Tyler Sanders, character in Furry Vengeance played by Matt Prokop

== See also ==
- Tyler Saunders, British trainer
