= Tyler McGillivary =

American fashion designer

Tyler McGillivary is an American fashion designer.

== Biography ==
McGillivary grew up in suburban Washington, D.C. As a child, she was often bored in her suburban environment so she often turned to the natural world for peace and inspiration. She taught herself how to operate a sewing machine from watching YouTube videos.

McGillivary studied visual arts, sociology, and art history at the Gallatin School of New York University. During her time enrolled at the school and after, she worked at several small independent businesses.

She founded her label, Tyler McGillivary, in 2018. She is inspired by illustration, contemporary art, and early animation and cartoons.

In 2022, McGillivary created an underwear collection for Parade titled "Twisted Summer" which featured bras, briefs, tops, and shorts "covered in trippy, warped patterns."

In February 2025, she had her debut New York Fashion Week runway show. Titled "Date Night" it was an ode to "NYC, martinis, getting dressed up and falling head over heels for someone — if only for one night."
