= Tyler LeVander =

American drummer (born 1990)

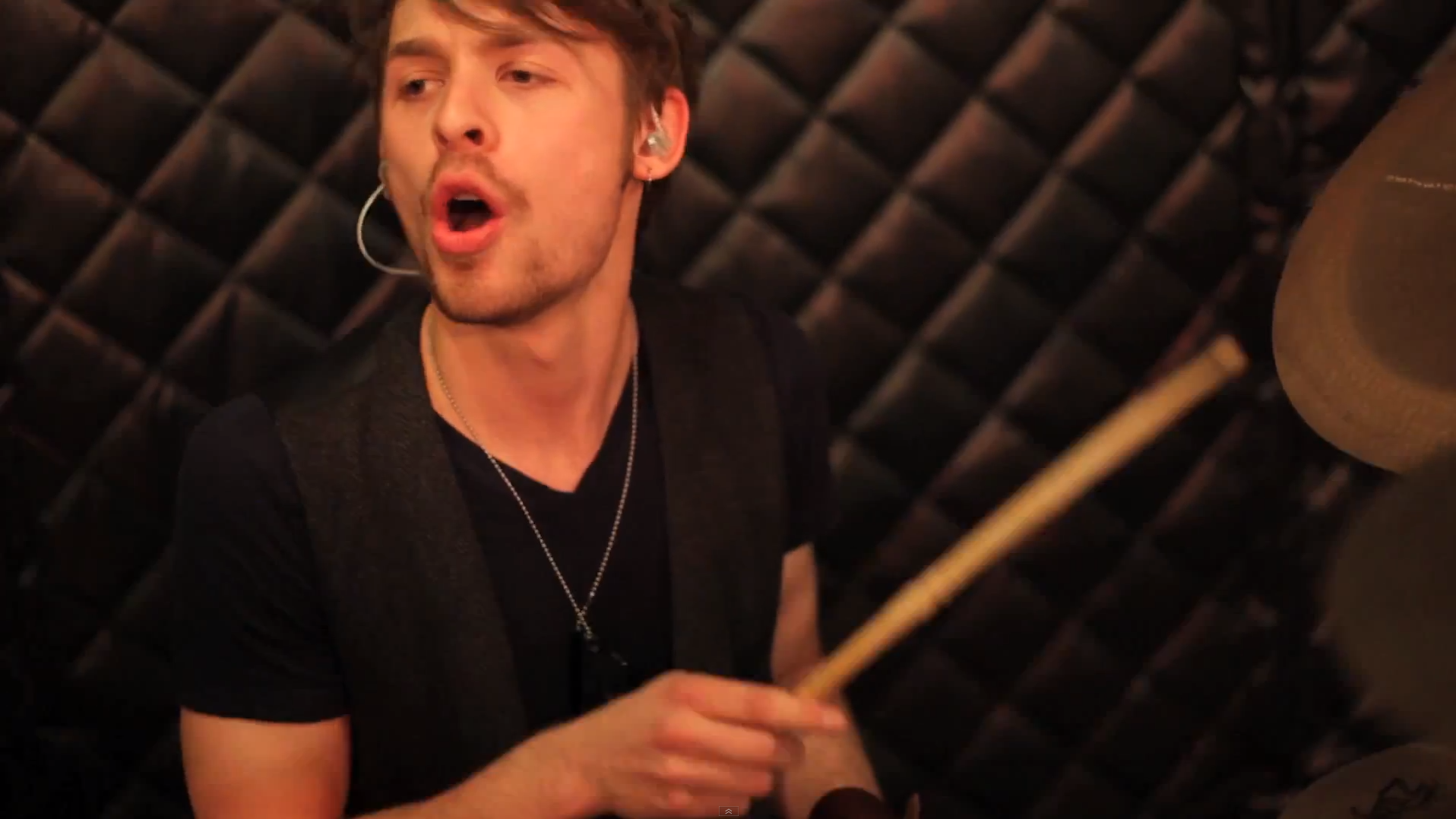
- LeVander drumming with The Fates, 2012

Background information
- Born: Tyler Michael LeVander; December 31, 1990 (age 34)
- Genres: Rock, Pop, Metal, Jazz, Electronic, Hip-hop, Film Scores
- Occupations: Drummer, Composer, Producer
- Instruments: Drums, Piano, Synthesizer

Tyler LeVander (also known as Baasick) is an American session drummer, composer and producer. LeVander attended Wilton High School in Wilton, Connecticut, and is a scholarship recipient and alumnus of Berklee College of Music in Boston, Massachusetts. There, he studied under Rod Morgenstein, Casey Scheuerell, Mike Mangini and Kenwood Dennard.

An accomplished studio recording and live drummer, LeVander has toured or recorded with acts including David Cassidy, Ethan Brosh, Ben Levin Group, Ken Yates, Don Lappin, Arthur Lipner, Juicy J and The Fates.

LeVander has performed internationally, at venues including the Hammersmith Apollo, the MGM Grand Garden Arena and the Superstar Theater.

In 2011, LeVander co-wrote and recorded Drama Dropout, The Fates' debut EP produced by Craig J. Snider. He appeared in a music video for The Fates' song "Miss America" alongside internet personality Meekakitty.

LeVander is an active film composer, and is the producer for multiple musical artists, including Zee, MarBar and Greg Oliveras.

LeVander is listed as a post-production and mastering engineer for Future Hits Music, a co-publisher of Spirit Music Group.

== With MarBar ==
LeVander produces, records and performs with CT rapper MarBar under the pseudonym Baasick. With MarBar, he has toured prolifically, performing with artists including Juicy J, Kid Ink, Chris Webby, Apathy, and Spose.

== Discography ==
=== Selected album appearances (as drummer) ===
With Ben Levin Group

- Departure (2009)
- Pulse of a Nation (2010)
- Invisible Paradise (2012)

With Ethan Brosh

- Live The Dream (2014)

With Ken Yates

- The Backseat EP (2011)

With The Fates

- Drama Dropout EP (2011)
- Princess of China (Single) (2011)
- Last Friday Night (Single) (2011)
- Skyscraper (Single) (2011)

With Burn The Fens

- Crown (2002)

=== Selected album credits (as producer) ===
MarBar

- Lighters EP (2013)
- Droppleganger (2014)

Greg Oliveras

- Envision A World EP (2014)
