= Tyler Stableford =

- Born: April 12, 1975 (age 51); Burlington, Vermont, U.S.
- Education: Dartmouth College
- Occupations: Commercial director, cinematographer and photographer
- Writing career
- Period: 1996–present
- Website: TylerStableford.com

Tyler Stableford is an American commercial director, cinematographer, and photographer, best known for filming outdoor-lifestyle brand anthems and shooting adventure sports images. He is the owner of Tyler Stableford Productions in Carbondale, Colorado.

In 2007, Men's Journal named Stableford one of the "World's Seven Greatest Adventure Photographers."

Since 2008, Stableford has been one of Canon's "Explorers of Light." As a photography and cinematography ambassador for the company, he has taught workshops and seminars at various trade shows around the world and shot promotional film and photos for Canon's product campaigns.

Stableford has won numerous prizes as a commercial director, including nine Telly Awards (Cabela's, 2014 & 2015; Walls Outdoor Wear, 2017; and Cinch Western Wear, 2016 & 2017).

== Education and early career ==
Born in Burlington, Vermont, Stableford studied English at Dartmouth College, where he was president of the Dartmouth Mountaineering Club. He graduated with a B.A. in 1996 and started his career as an adventure sports photojournalist.

Stableford became a contributing editor at Climbing magazine in 1996 and was hired full-time as photo & equipment editor a year later. In 2002, Stableford became the editor of Rock and Ice magazine, and stayed until 2004.

Stableford signed with Getty Images as a stock photographer in 1996, mainly shooting climbing, skiing, trail running, mountain biking, and other action sports. In the late 1990s, his photographs appeared in Outside, Ski, Backpacker, Climbing, and Rock and Ice, among other adventure sports publications.

== Commercial videography and cinematography ==
Stableford is known for devoting one week per year to pro-bono videography and photography. He has shot for various charities and non-profits, including: Wide Horizons for Children (2009–Present), the U.S. Paralympic Alpine National Team (2010), Heart Gallery (2010–Present), the Manaus Fund's Valley Settlement project (2013), and the Little Baby Face Foundation (2014).

== Documentary films ==
In 2016, Stableford directed The Calling: A Portrait of Life in the High Country, a short film featuring three Colorado residents—a rock climber, a rancher, and a spirits distiller—pursuing their professional dreams. The documentary was produced by Steve Tobenkin of LeTo Entertainment for Canon, and was a collaboration with Academy Award-winning cinematographer Russell Carpenter. The film was presented by Canon at the 2017 Sundance Film Festival.

In 2012, Stableford produced, directed and DP'd Shattered, a short film about renowned alpinist Steve House's search for meaning beyond climbing. The film, which was part of a branded content campaign for Canon, won Grand Jury Prizes at both the Chamonix Adventure Festival and International Mountain Film Festival of Autrans, and a silver medal for Best Cinematography at the Art Directors Club Annual Awards, and was a Vimeo Staff Pick.

Shattered also screened at the Aspen Shortsfest, Telluride Mountainfilm Festival, Kendal Mountain Festival, Vancouver International Mountain Film Festival, Adventure Awards Days, 5Point Film Festival, New Zealand Mountain Film Festival, INKAFEST Mountain Film Festival, Fontana Arts Festival, Adventure Movie Awards, Coldsmoke Winter Film, and Fernie Mountain Film Festival.

In 2010, Stableford produced, directed and DP'd The Fall Line: A Warrior's Return. The short film follows 101st Airborne Ranger Heath Calhoun, who lost his legs in a grenade blast in Iraq, as he trains to compete in the 2010 Winter Paralympics as a downhill ski racer for the U.S. Paralympic National Team. Stableford donated the film to the team for its fundraising campaign.

The Fall Line won awards at the Official Best of Fest, Mammoth Mountain Film Festival, 5Point Film Festival, and Taos Short Film Festival, and was selected to the Banff Mountain Film Festival World Tour. The film also screened at the Telluride Mountainfilm Festival, Vail Film Festival, Spokane International Film Festival, Durango Independent Film Festival, Boulder Adventure Film Festival, and the Ski Channel Film Festival.

== TV episodes ==
In June 2017 Stableford directed and DP'd a 30-minute documentary episode for Turning Point TV series on BYUtv, a collaboration with Cosmic Pictures production company. The episode features Rev. Richard Joyner working to transform the poor rural town of Conetoe, North Carolina through his work with the non-profit Conetoe Family Life Center and its community garden and youth-empowerment programs. The episode will air in October 2017.

== Awards ==
- 2017: Telly Awards – Craft-Videography/Cinematography: Silver Award, for a Walls Outdoor Goods "Heavy Industry."
- 2017: Telly Awards – People's Telly: Bronze Award, for Cinch Western Wear "Out Here."
- 2017: Telly Awards — People's Telly: Bronze Award, for Cinch Western Wear "Practice."
- 2017: Graphis magazine – Photo Annual issue: Silver Award, for a shot of a quarry worker.
- 2017: Graphis magazine — Photo Annual issue: Silver Award, for a shot of Adidas Outdoor rock climber Ben Rueck.
- 2016: Communication Arts magazine – Photo Annual issue: Award of Excellence, for a shot of Bruce Turnbull and his horse Twister from "The Farmers" portrait series.
- 2016: Telly Awards – Sports/Sporting Goods: Silver Award, for Cinch Western Wear "Rodeo."
- 2016: Graphis magazine – Photo Annual issue: Gold Award, for "The Boxer."
- 2015: Telly Awards – Promotional Piece, Peoples' Telly: Bronze Award, for Cabela's "Disconnect Day."
- 2015: Telly Awards — Marketing Piece, Peoples' Telly: Bronze Award, for Cabela's "Disconnect Day."
- 2015: Telly Awards — TV Commercial, Peoples' Telly: Bronze Award, for Cabela's "Disconnect Day."
- 2014: Telly Awards – Sports/Sporting Goods: Bronze Award, for Cabela's "It's in Your Nature."
- 2014: Telly Awards — Retail Store/Specialty Store: Bronze Award, for Cabela's "It's in Your Nature."
- 2014: AME Awards – Sports and Leisure: Silver Medallion, for Cabela's brand anthem "It's In Your Nature."
- 2013: Ad Week magazine – Ad of the Day, for Cabela's brand anthem "It's In Your Nature."
- 2013: AI-AP – International Motion Arts Awards: "Top 39" film, for Shattered.
- 2013: The Art Directors Club Annual Awards – Cinematography: Silver Medal, for Shattered.
- 2012: Chamonix Film Festival — Jury Prize, for Shattered.
- 2012: The International Mountain Film Festival of Autrans — Jury Prize, for Shattered.
- 2012: Graphis magazine – Photo Annual issue: Merit Award, for "Fighter Pilot."
- 2012: Graphis magazine – Photo Annual issue: Merit Award, for "Nude in New Hampshire."
- 2011: Black & White magazine — 6th Annual Spider Awards: Photojournalism nominee, for a shot of Colorado's Air National Guard 120th Fighter Squadron returning home from Iraq
- 2011: International Photography Awards — Moving Images: First Place, for a shot of Colorado's Air National Guard 120th Fighter Squadron during a training flight.
- 2011: Digital Photo Pro magazine – Image of the Year 2010, for a shot of Colorado's Air National Guard 120th Fighter Squadron returning home from Iraq.
- 2010: Banff Mountain Film Festival – World Tour: Official Selection, for The Fall Line: A Warrior's Return.
- 2010: Taos Short Film Festival — Documentary: Honorable Mention, for The Fall Line: A Warrior's Return.
- 2010: 5Point Film Festival — Most Inspiring Story, for The Fall Line: A Warrior's Return.
- 2010: Official Best of Fest — Award-Winning Films to Inspire: Best Documentary, for The Fall Line: A Warrior's Return.
- 2010: Mammoth Mountain Film Festival — Best Documentary Short, for The Fall Line: A Warrior's Return.
- 2010: American Photo magazine – 2010 Images of the Year: Personal Project Runner-up, for a shot of Colorado's Air National Guard 120th Fighter Squadron during a training flight.
- 2010: American Photo magazine — 2010 Images of the Year: Photojournalist Runner-up, for a shot of Colorado's Air National Guard 120th Fighter Squadron returning home from Iraq.
- 2010: American Photography magazine – Photo Annual, issue 26: Selected Image, for a shot of Colorado's Air National Guard 120th Fighter Squadron during a training flight.
- 2010: American Photography magazine – Photo Annual, issue 26: Selected Image, for a shot of an orphan foraging in a Guatemalan landfill.
- 2009: American Photo magazine – 2009 Images of the Year: Grand Prize, for a shot of a Colorado wildfire firefighter.
- 2008: Black & White magazine – Single Image Contest: Merit Award, for "Little Squam Lake."
- 2008: International Photography Awards — Fine Art, Nudes: Third Place, for "Little Squam Lake."
- 2007: Communication Arts magazine – Photo Annual issue: Cover, Award of Excellence, for a shot of an ice climber exploring Iceland's Langjokull Glacier.
