= Tyler Blanski =

American singer-songwriter (born 1984)

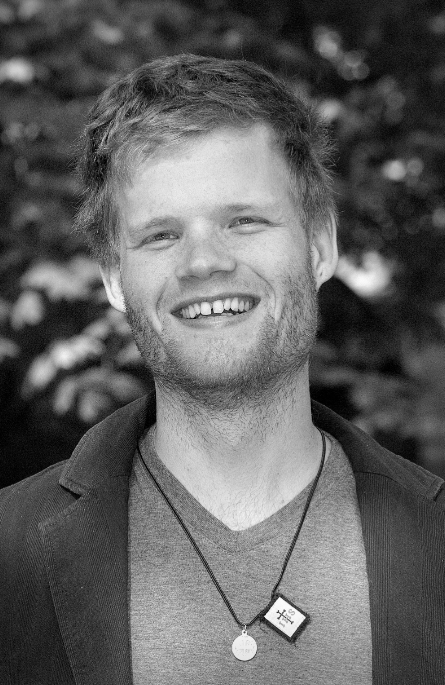

Background information
- Born: January 12, 1984 (age 42); Minneapolis, Minnesota
- Genres: Indie pop, folk-pop, rock,
- Occupations: Author, musician, producer
- Instruments: Vocals, guitar, harmonica
- Labels: Ezekiel Records & Creative Group
- Website: www.tylerblanski.com

Tyler Blanski (born January 12, 1984) is an American Roman Catholic author, musician, and record producer based in Minneapolis, Minnesota. He was raised as a Baptist and later became an Anglican, before converting to Catholicism.

== Biography ==
Tyler Blanski graduated from the Perpich Center for Arts Education in 2002, studied at the Centre for Medieval and Renaissance Studies at Oxford in 2005, and holds a bachelor of arts from Hillsdale College, Michigan, 2006. He studied at Nashotah House, an Anglican seminary in Wisconsin, while preparing to be an Anglican priest.

He is most known for his Christian memoir writing and poetry, and is one of the leading contemporary proponents of "Romantic Theology," cataphatic theology applied to heterosexual relationships, and typified in marriage. His writing is influenced by the writings of Dante, Charles Williams, John Donne, G. K. Chesterton, and Gerard Manley Hopkins. His theological vision is overlaid with his background in medieval studies.

In 2013, Zondervan published Blanski's theological creative non-fiction When Donkeys Talk: A Quest to Rediscover the Mystery and Wonder of Christianity. According to Publishers Weekly, the book is an invitation to go on "a Holy Pilgrimage to rediscover the saints, stars, and beauty of Christianity for the twenty-first century.” When Donkeys Talk is an apologia for a recovery of the Eucharist and Baptism as sacraments. “This world is God’s Kingdom, and Christians need to baptize everything that used to exalt itself against the knowledge of God. Blanski’s work is Anglican popularizing Christendom at its best.” The Foreword is written by musician Fernando Ortega.

In 2010, Fresh Air Books (an imprint of Upper Room Books) published Blanski's Mud & Poetry: Love, Sex, and the Sacred. The book expresses Blanski's sacramental belief that Christian marriage can be a means of grace and viable way of "working out your salvation." He continues the cataphatic theology he first argued in a 2005 article: "rather than dogmatically organizing our relationships around chastity, Christian lovers should emphasize the very Figure of their faith and let the details of their relationships consequently fall in place." Publishers Weekly commented: "Blanski is on a mission to shake up Christianity. The themes he addresses are not new, but his edgy and hip prose breathes new life into them." The Foreword is written by Michael Bauman, professor of theology and culture at Hillsdale College. It was a Finalist for National Indie Excellence Award.

In 2013, Blanski contributed an article on urban ministry to RELEVANT Magazine. He wrote an article on how "sex is interwoven with affection, the future, and death" for Christianity Today in the same year. In 2011, Blanski contributed articles to ABC's Good Morning America and CNN's Belief Blog elaborating his view of Christian sexuality. Blanski blogs for the Huffington Post.

In 2013, Blanski's poem "Jude" was published by Curator Magazine. In 2011, Blanski's poem "O Soulish Violets in Springtime Five Fallible Senses," a poem of strong hostility toward pragmatism and empiricism, was published in issue No. 20 of Geez Magazine, where he writes: "I need more than signs."

== Published works ==
- Clay Eyes (Ezekiel Records & Creative Group, Minneapolis, 2008)
- Loveletting (Ezekiel Records & Creative Group, Minneapolis, 2010)
- Mud & Poetry: Love, Sex, and the Sacred (Fresh Air Books, Nashville, 2010)
- When Donkeys Talk: A Quest to Rediscover the Mystery and Wonder of Christianity (Zondervan, Grand Rapids, 2013)
- An Immovable Feast: How I Gave Up Spirituality for a Life of Religious Abundance (Ignatius Press, 2018)

== Discography ==
- Out from the Darkness (Ezekiel Records & Creative Group, Minneapolis, 2008)
- Think Out Loud: Music Serving the Homeless in the Twin Cities (Ezekiel Records & Creative Group, Minneapolis, 2008)
