= Tyler Forbes =

Tyler Forbes may refer to:

- Tyler Hornby-Forbes (born 1996), English footballer
- Tyler Forbes (footballer, born 2002) (born 2002), British Virgin Islands footballer
