= Tyler Christopher =

Tyler Christopher may refer to:

- Tyler Christopher (actor) (1972–2023), American actor
- Tyler Christopher (athlete) (born 1983), Canadian sprinter

== See also ==
- Christopher Tyler, visual psychophysicist
