= Tyler Williams =

Tyler Williams may refer to:

- Tyler James Williams (born 1992), American actor and musician
- Tyler Williams (cyclist) (born 1994), American cyclist
- T-Minus (record producer) (born Tyler Williams, born 1988), Canadian record producer

== See also ==
- Tyler Lee Williams (fl. 2010-current), husband of Safiya Nygaard
