= Tyler Robinson =

Tyler Robinson may refer to:

- Tyler James Robinson (born 2003), accused assassin of Charlie Kirk
- Tyler Robinson (American football), member of the 2011 Kentucky Wildcats football team
- Tyler Robinson (Canadian football), participant in the 1986 CFL Draft
- Tyler Robinson (singer), contestant on The Voice (US series 1)
- Tyler Robinson, namesake of The Tyler Robinson Foundation
