= Tyler Read =

Tyler Read may refer to:

- Tyler Read (band), American rock band
- S. Tyler Read (1836–1880), Union Army officer in the American Civil War
- Tyler Read (actor), New Zealand actor

== See also ==
- Tyler Reed (disambiguation)
- Tyler Reid (disambiguation)
