= Tyler Stone =

Tyler Stone may refer to:

- Tyler Stone (Marvel Comics), a Marvel Comics character
- Tyler Stone (basketball) (born 1991), American basketball player
