= Tyler Freeman =

Tyler Freeman may refer to:

- Tyler Freeman (soccer) (born 2003), American soccer player
- Tyler Freeman (baseball) (born 1999), American baseball player
