= Tailor (surname) =

Tailor is a surname. Notable people with the surname include:

- Dipak Tailor, English badminton player
- Jade Tailor, American actress
- Kanubhai Hasmukhbhai Tailor, Indian social worker, working towards physically disabled
- K. N. Tailor, Indian actor, director and producer in Tulu films
- Manisha Tailor
