= Justice Tyler =

Justice Tyler may refer to:

- James Manning Tyler (1835–1926), associate justice of the Vermont Supreme Court
- John Tyler Sr. (1747–1813), associate justice of the first Virginia Court of Appeals
- Royall Tyler (1757–1826), associate justice of the Vermont Supreme Court

== See also ==
- Judge Tyler (disambiguation)
