= Tyler Turner =

Tyler Turner may refer:

- Tyler Turner (gymnast), American artistic gymnast
- Tyler Turner (soccer), American soccer player
- Tyler Turner (snowboarder), Canadian para-snowboarder
