= Tyler Miller (disambiguation) =

Tyler Miller (born 1993) is an American soccer player.

Tyler Miller may also refer to:

- G. Tyler Miller (1902–1988), third president of James Madison University
- Tyler Joe Miller, Canadian country singer and songwriter
- Tyler Miller (musician), vocalist for Thy Art is Murder and Aversions Crown
- Tyler Miller (American football) (born 2001), American football player
