= Tyler Boyd =

Tyler Boyd may refer to:

- Tyler Boyd (American football) (born 1994), American wide receiver
- Tyler Boyd (soccer) (born 1994), American soccer player
