= Tyler Evans =

Tyler Evans may refer to:

- Tyler Evans of 2010 Nebraska Cornhuskers football team
- Tyler Evans, character in V (2009 TV series)
- Tyler Evans, psychic medium in Portals to Hell (TV Series) episode 14, season 2
