= Tyler Ennis =

Tyler Ennis may refer to:

- Tyler Ennis (basketball) (born 1994), Canadian basketball player
- Tyler Ennis (ice hockey) (born 1989), Canadian ice hockey player
