= George Tyler (cricketer) =

English cricketer

George Edward Tyler (3 October 1898 – 24 February 1976) was an English cricketer who played for Warwickshire in one first-class match in 1919. He was born in Yardley, Birmingham and died in Edgbaston.

Tyler was a right-handed batsman for Moseley in the Birmingham and District Cricket League. His single first-class appearance came as an allowed substitute in a non-County Championship match against Worcestershire in which Warwickshire, having an extremely unsuccessful season, tried several amateur players; Tyler took the place of Albert Howell, who had been injured early in the match while bowling. Tyler did not bat, bowl or take any catches during the match, and was not selected by Warwickshire again.
