= Tyler Mitchell =

Tyler Mitchell may refer to:

- Tyler Mitchell (musician) (born 1958), American jazz musician
- Tyler Mitchell (photographer) (born 1995), American photographer

== See also ==
- Tyler-Jane Mitchel (born 1973), New Zealand actress
- Taylor Mitchell (1990–2009), Canadian country folk singer
