= Taylor =

Taylor, Taylors or Taylor's may refer to:

== People ==
- Taylor (surname)
  - List of people with surname Taylor
- Taylor (given name), including Tayla and Taylah
- Taylor sept, a branch of Scottish clan Cameron
- Justice Taylor (disambiguation)

== Places ==
=== Australia ===
- Electoral district of Taylor, South Australia
- Taylor, Australian Capital Territory, planned suburb

=== Canada ===
- Taylor, British Columbia

=== United States ===
- Taylor, Alabama
- Taylor, Arizona
- Taylor, Arkansas
- Taylor, Louisiana
- Taylor, Maryland
- Taylor, Michigan
- Taylor, Mississippi
- Taylor, Missouri
- Taylor, Nebraska
- Taylor, North Dakota
- Taylor, New York
- Taylor, Beckham County, Oklahoma
- Taylor, Cotton County, Oklahoma
- Taylor, Pennsylvania
- Taylors, South Carolina
- Taylor, Texas
- Taylor, Utah
- Taylor, Washington
- Taylor, West Virginia
- Taylor, Wisconsin
- Taylor, Wyoming
- Taylor County (disambiguation)
- Taylor Township (disambiguation)

== Businesses and organisations ==
- Taylor's (department store) in Quebec, Canada
- Taylor Guitars, an American guitar manufacturer
- Taylor University, in Upland, Indiana, U.S.
- Taylor's University, commonly referred to as Taylor's, in Subang Jaya, Selangor, Malaysia
  - Taylor's College
- John Taylor & Co, or Taylor's Bell Foundry, Taylor's of Loughborough, or Taylor's, in England
- Taylor Company, a maker of foodservice equipment owned by Middleby Corporation

== Science and technology ==
- Taylor knock-out factor, for evaluating the stopping power of hunting cartridges
- Taylor's law, an empirical law in ecology
- Taylor rule, in economics
- Taylor series, in mathematics, infinite series of polynomials which asymptotically approaches infinitely differentiable functions
- Taylor's theorem, in calculus
- AMD Taylor, alternate name for the Turion 64 X2 computer processor

== Other uses ==
- Taylor Law, an article of New York State Law
- Taylor (crater), on the Moon
- "Taylor" (song) by Jack Johnson, 2004
- USS Taylor, the name of several American ships

== See also ==
- Tailor (disambiguation)
- Taylorism, a theory of scientific management, named after Frederick Winslow Taylor
- Tylor
