= Justice Taylor =

Justice Taylor may refer to:

- Alan Taylor (Australian judge) (1901–1969), justice of the High Court of Australia
- Chris Taylor (judge) (born 1968), associate justice of the Wisconsin Supreme Court
- Clarence J. Taylor (1894–1988), associate justice of the Idaho Supreme Court
- Claude A. Taylor (1902–1966), chief justice of the South Carolina Supreme Court
- Clifford Taylor (born 1942), chief justice of the Michigan Supreme Court
- David Taylor (Wisconsin judge) (1818–1891), associate justice of the Wisconsin Supreme Court
- Herman H. Taylor (1877–1929), justice of the Idaho Supreme Court
- John Louis Taylor (1769–1829), chief justice of the North Carolina Supreme Court
- John M. Taylor (judge) (1788–1856), justice of the Alabama Supreme Court
- John Taylor (Mississippi judge) (c. 1785–1820), justice of the Mississippi Supreme Court
- Peter Taylor, Baron Taylor of Gosforth (1930–1997), Lord Chief Justice of England and Wales
- R. Fenwick Taylor (1849–1928), associate justice of the Florida Supreme Court
- Steven W. Taylor (born 1949), associate justice of the Oklahoma Supreme Court
- William A. Taylor (1928–2010), justice of the Wyoming Supreme Court
- William H. Taylor (judge) (1863–1926), associate justice of the Vermont Supreme Court
- William M. Taylor (1876–1959), justice of the Texas Supreme Court

== See also ==
- Judge Taylor (disambiguation)
