= Tyler Reid =

Tyler Reid may refer to:

- Tyler Reid (rugby league) (born 1994), Australian rugby league footballer
- Tyler Reid (footballer) (born 1997), English association footballer for Sheriff Tiraspol

== See also ==
- Tyler Read (disambiguation)
- Tyler Reed (disambiguation)
