= Tyler Harvey =

Tyler Harvey may refer to:

- Tyler Harvey (basketball), American basketball player
- Tyler Harvey (footballer), English footballer
