= Tyler Baker =

Tyler Baker may refer to:

== People ==
- Tyler Christopher (actor) (born Tyler Christopher Baker, 1972), American actor
- Tyler Baker (baseball), American baseball player for Sydney Blue Sox
- Tyler A. Baker III on List of law clerks for the fourth seat of the Supreme Court of the United States

== Fictional characters ==
- Tyler Baker, Sherman Oaks character played by Jason Behr
