= Tyler Young =

Tyler Young may refer to:

- Tyler Young (actor) (born 1990), American actor
- Tyler Young (racing driver) (born 1990), American stock car racing driver
- Tyler Young (footballer) (born 2006), English footballer
