= Tyler Collins =

Tyler Collins may refer to:

- Tyler Collins (singer) (born 1965), American R&B singer and actress
- Tyler Collins (actor), American actor and composer
- Tyler Collins (baseball) (born 1990), American baseball player
