= Tyler Kolek =

Tyler Kolek may refer to:

- Tyler Kolek (baseball) (born 1995), American baseball player
- Tyler Kolek (basketball) (born 2001), American basketball player
