= Tyler Olson =

Tyler Olson may refer to:

- Tyler Olson (politician) (born 1976), American politician from Iowa
- Tyler Olson (baseball) (born 1989), American baseball player
