= Tyler Reed =

Tyler Reed may refer to:

- Tyler Reed (American football) (born 1982), American football player
- Tyler Reed (swimmer) (born 1988), American swimmer

== See also ==
- Tyler Read (disambiguation)
- Tyler Reid (disambiguation)
