= Tyler Moore (powerlifter) =

American powerlifter (born 1993)

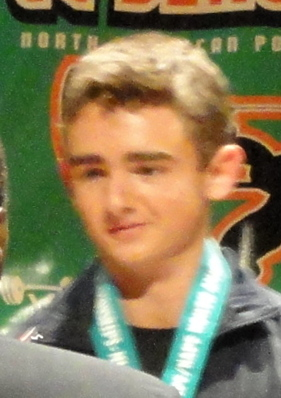
- Tyler Moore, 2011

Personal information
- Full name: Tyler Moore
- Born: August 20, 1993 (age 32)
- Home town: Pagosa Springs, CO

Sport
- Country: United States
- College team: Colorado State University
- Club: Rocky Mountain Lifting Club
Medal record
Men's powerlifting
Representing the United States
NAPF
Gold medal – first place	2013 NAPF Bench Press Championships	Miami, FL
Gold medal – first place	2011 NAPF Bench Press Championships	Miami, FL
USAPL
Gold medal – first place	2012 Rocky Mountain State Games	Colorado Springs, CO
Gold medal – first place	2011 Colorado State Championships	Aurora, CO
Gold medal – first place	2011 Colorado State Open Championships	Aurora, CO
Gold medal – first place	2011 Rocky Mountain State Games	Colorado Springs, CO
Gold medal – first place	2010 Colorado State Championships	Aurora, CO
Gold medal – first place	2010 RAW National Championships	Denver, CO
Gold medal – first place	2009 Colorado State Championships	Aurora, CO
Silver medal – second place	2009 Wisconsin Dells Classis	Wisconsin Dells, WI
Team International
Gold medal – first place	2013 NAPF Bench Press Men's Team USA	Miami, FL
Gold medal – first place	2011 NAPF Bench Press Men's Team USA	Miami, FL
Gold medal – first place	2011 NAPF Bench Press Team Jr USA	Miami, FL
Gold medal – first place	2011 NAPF Bench Press Team Sub-Jr USA	Miami, FL

Tyler Moore is an international Powerlifter for Team USA and is a competitor in the Men's Open Division. As a teenager, he was elected Team USA's Jr Bench Press Team captain, and won his first international title at the NAPF Bench Press Championships in 2011. Moore is a member of the USAPL and competes in both the equipped and RAW styles of powerlifting. He is a two-time North American Bench Press Champion and holds 20 American Records.

== Junior career ==
Moore began his powerlifting career in July 2009 at the Wisconsin Dells State Championships, placing 2nd.

Moore competed at the 2009 Colorado State Championships in Aurora, CO. He placed 1st overall in the Men's High School Division and broke two American Records. It was at this meet he met World Champions Dan and Jennifer Gaudreau, who would later influence his training.

In 2010, Moore competed at the 2010 RAW National Championships in Denver, CO. He placed 1st overall in the Men's High School Division and broke four American Records.. He then entered the 2010 Colorado State Championships in Aurora, CO, again placing 1st overall in the Men's High School Division and breaking five American Records.

In 2011, Moore competed at the 2011 Rocky Mountain State Games in Colorado Springs, CO. This was his first International Team Qualifying Event. He placed 1st overall in the Men's Sub-Jr Division and broke three American Records. He also was selected for the NAPF Bench Press Championships World Team. At this event, Moore became the first person in his division to ever break the 1000 lbs Total Record as well as the 300 lbs Bench Press Record. Moore then competed at the 2011 Colorado State Championships in Aurora, CO, and placed 1st overall in both the Men's High School division and the Men's Open Division.

== Collegiate career ==
In 2012, Moore competed at the 2012 Rocky Mountain State Games in Colorado Springs, CO. Representing Colorado State University, he placed 1st overall in the Men's Jr Division and was selected for the 2012 NAPF Bench Press Championships World Team, but fell just short of the Men's Open RAW Bench Press Record.

== International career ==
Tyler Moore made his international debut in 2011 at the NAPF Bench Press Championships in Miami, FL. He completed a Bench Press of 314.75 lbs and won 1st place for the USA.

Moore was invited to compete in the 2012 NAPF Bench Press Championships in Denver, CO and was also given a position on the 2013 World Team for the World Games in Cali, Colombia.

== Records ==
Event	Lbs/Kg	When - Where
Bench Press	236.75/107.5	12/5/2009 - Aurora, CO "State"
Bench Press	248.00/112.5	7/16/2010 - Denver, CO "RAW Nationals"
Bench Press	275.5/125.0	12/4/2010 - Denver, CO "State"
Bench Press	303.00/137.5	7/30/2011 - Colorado Springs, CO "RMSG"
Squat	286.5/130.0	7/16/2010 - Denver, CO "RAW Nationals"
Squat	325.0/147.5	12/4/2010 - Denver, CO "State"
Squat	341.5/155.0	7/30/2011 - Colorado Springs, CO "RMSG"
Deadlift	347.0/157.5	7/16/2010 - Denver, CO "RAW Nationals"
Deadlift	363.75/165.0	12/4/2010 - Denver, CO "State"
Total	804.5/365.0	12/5/2009 - Aurora, CO "State"
Total	881.75/400.0	7/16/2010 - Denver, CO "RAW Nationals"
Total	953.25/432.5	12/3/2010 - Denver, CO "State"
Total	964.5/437.5	12/4/2010 - Denver, CO "State"
Total	1019.5/462.5	7/30/2011 - Colorado Springs, CO "RMSG"
