= Tyler Hoover =

Tyler Hoover may refer to:

- Tyler Hoover, host of the YouTube channel Hoovie's Garage
- Tyler Hoover (American football), American football player
