= Tyler Hill, Kent =

Village in Kent, England

Coordinates: 51.3069°N 1.0695°E

Tyler Hill

- Location within Kent
- Population: 715
- Civil parish: Hackington
- District: City of Canterbury
- Shire county: Kent
- Region: South East
- Country: England
- Sovereign state: United Kingdom
- Post town: Canterbury
- Postcode district: CT2
- Dialling code: 01227
- Police: Kent
- Fire: Kent
- Ambulance: South East Coast
- UK Parliament: Canterbury

Tyler Hill is a small village on the northern outskirts of Canterbury, Kent in England. The population is included in the civil parish of Hackington.

== Etymology ==
The first half of 'Tyler Hill' comes from the old french word “tieuleor, tieulier” It is an occupational name, referring to the area's notable tiling and brick making industry.

== History ==
Early History

Tyler Hill was at the centre of a thriving tiling and pottery economy as area had abundant a large supply of timber and london clay. It is believed a fire in Canterbury in 1174 boosted production in Tyler Hill, as many of the timber buildings were destroyed and money was put into a safer tiled roof alterntaive. Parisian tilers arrived in the area at around 1280-1285, and brought more decorated tiling styles to the local area. In 1325, tile production began to be exported to Buckinghamshire. The industry did not fully begin to waiver until 1350.

Modern History

Construction began in 1826 of the Tyler Hill tunnels, which later became open in 1830. Later, the local Baptist Chapel opened in 1885. At start of the Second World war, a nearby searchlight battery was operated and was manned by the 508 Searchlight Battery until October 1941. To create a possible roadblock for enemy vehicles, a failed attempt was made to demolish a local road bridge that crossed Canterbury to Whitstable Railway.

Tyler Hill tunnel entrance

On May 1942, anti-aircraft guns, which had four 3.7 inch guns, were placed in a field north of Hothe Court Farm for defence. Bombs dropped by enemy planes at Cheesecourt Gate revealed a 13th century pottery kiln from the damage.

In 1953, train operations from Tyler Hill tunnel along the Whitstable and Canterbury railway closed. The Construction of the new Kent University in the 1970s caused the Tyler Hill Tunnels to partially collapse.

In 2000, Tlyer Hill was excavated on the Time Team television programme and a large kiln was uncovered; this near-intact kiln is one of the best-preserved mediaeval tile kilns found in England.

== Amenities ==
Ivy House, Tyler Hill in 2009

Tyler Hill four bus stations (Britton Court Farm and The Tyler’s Kiln) along Hackington Road. The stations go through routes 5, 914, 915, 916 and 917.

There is a town hall, known as Tyler Hill Memorial Hall, that organises activities such as Cricket Club, Art classes and Youth Football Club. The hall was established in the 1950s, following the donation of 4 acres of land. Bonfire Night has been an organised event in Tyler Hill since 1972.

Along Hackington Road is a pub known as The Tyler's Kiln Public House, Previously known as Ivy House. The pub was first established as Ivy House in 1843. The name changed in 2009 when Nigel Morris purchased the business.

== Demographics ==
There is a slightly higher amount of men than women in the area with around 52.6% identify as male and 47.4% as female. Those from ages 10-19 make up an overwhelming majority in the area. Around 241 people are from this age bracket. Around 87.6% of residents are born in the United Kingdom. Of the non British births, Europe is the highest at 29 people; 28 of those people coming from the European Union. Most of the people of Tyler Hill identify as white. 4.4% identify as Asian and an equal percent of black and mixed people at 2.7%. The population has seen a 6.2% increase.
