= Tyler Schultz =

American shot putter

Personal information
- Nationality: USA
- Born: March 29, 1994 (age 32)
- Height: 5 ft 11 in (1.80 m)

Sport
- Sport: Track and field
- Event: Shot put
- College team: Colorado State Rams

Achievements and titles
- Personal best: SP (6 kg): 18.35 (Eugene 2011)
Medal record
Men's Athletics
Representing the United States
World Youth Championships
| Silver medal – second place | 2011 Lille Métropole | Shot put |

Tyler Schultz (born March 29, 1994) is an American shot putter.

He won a silver medal at the 2011 World Youth Championships in Athletics.

Schultz attended Custer High School, where he also played varsity football and basketball. In April 2012, he broke the South Dakota state record in shot put, throwing 69 ft 5 3/4 in (21.18 m) at the Custer Invitational track and field meet.

Schultz committed to Colorado State University.

He was a USA Today All-American track and field selection in 2012.
