= Tyler Hill, Pennsylvania =

Unincorporated community in Pennsylvania, US

- Unincorporated community
- Location within Pennsylvania
- Coordinates: 41°41′42″N 75°06′29″W
- Country: United States
- State: Pennsylvania
- County: Wayne
- Elevation: 1,243 ft (379 m)
- Time zone: UTC-5 (Eastern (EST))
  - Summer (DST): UTC-4 (EDT)
- ZIP code: 18469
- Area codes: 272 & 570
- GNIS feature ID: 1190038

Tyler Hill is an unincorporated community in Wayne County, Pennsylvania, United States. The community is located along Pennsylvania Route 371, 11.3 miles (18.2 km) northeast of Honesdale. Tyler Hill has a post office with ZIP code 18469, which opened on January 14, 1878.
