= Tiler =

Tiler is a surname. Notable people with the surname include:

- Brian Tiler (1943–1990), English footballer
- Carl Tiler (born 1970), English footballer
- Ken Tiler (born 1950), English footballer
- Rebekah Tiler (born 1999), British weightlifter
- William Tiler (fl. 1406 – c. 1407), English politician

== Other uses ==
- Tiler Peck (born 1989), American ballet dancer

== See also ==
- Tile, a floor, roof or wall covering
- Tiler (Masonic)
- Tyler (surname)
