= 2015 NACAC Championships in Athletics – Results =

These are the full results of the 2015 NACAC Championships which took place in San José, Costa Rica, from 7 to 9 August at the Estadio Nacional.

== Men's results ==
=== 100 meters ===
Final – 8 August
Wind: -0.1 m/s

Rank	Name	Nationality	Time	Notes
1st place, gold medalist(s)	Remontay McClain	United States	10.09	
2nd place, silver medalist(s)	Ramon Gittens	Barbados	10.11	
3rd place, bronze medalist(s)	Levi Cadogan	Barbados	10.13	(0.122)
4	Jason Livermore	Jamaica	10.13	(0.125)
5	Kemar Hyman	Cayman Islands	10.21	
6	Jason Rogers	Saint Kitts and Nevis	10.29	
7	Sheldon Mitchell	Jamaica	10.31	
8	Beejay Lee	United States	10.36	

Semifinals
2 semifinals – Advance 3 on place + 2 on time

Semifinal 1 – 7 August
Wind: +2.7 m/s

Rank	Name	Nationality	Time	Notes
1	Ramon Gittens	Barbados	10.01 w	Q
2	Sheldon Mitchell	Jamaica	10.09 w	Q
3	Remontay McClain	United States	10.12 w	Q
4	Emmanuel Callender	Trinidad and Tobago	10.25 w	
5	Benjamin Williams	Canada	10.26 w	
6	Cruz Rolando Palacios	Honduras	10.31 w	
7	Stanly del Carmen	Dominican Republic	10.32 w	
8	Allistar Clark	Saint Kitts and Nevis	10.36 w	

Semifinal 2 – 7 August
Wind: +3.0 m/s

Rank	Name	Nationality	Time	Notes
1	Kemar Hyman	Cayman Islands	9.85 w	Q
2	Jason Rogers	Saint Kitts and Nevis	9.98 w	Q
3	Beejay Lee	United States	10.00 w	Q
4	Jason Livermore	Jamaica	10.01 w	q (0.001)
5	Levi Cadogan	Barbados	10.01 w	q (0.006)
6	Julius Morris	Montserrat	10.06 w	
7	Yohandris Andújar	Dominican Republic	10.27 w	
8	Jared Jarvis	Antigua and Barbuda	10.30 w	

Heats
4 heats – Advance 3 on place + 4 on time

Heat 1
– 7 August
Wind: +4.4 m/s

Rank	Name	Nationality	Time	Notes
1	Ramon Gittens	Barbados	10.07 w	Q
2	Jason Livermore	Jamaica	10.12 w	Q
3	Yohandris Andújar	Dominican Republic	10.28 w	Q
4	Jared Jarvis	Antigua and Barbuda	10.33 w	q
5	Shernyl Burns	Montserrat	10.60 w	
6	Mark Anthony Anderson	Belize	10.78 w	
7	Marcus Vilme	Haiti	11.03 w	

Heat 2
– 7 August
Wind: +1.9 m/s

Rank	Name	Nationality	Time	Notes
1	Sheldon Mitchell	Jamaica	10.07	Q CR
2	Levi Cadogan	Barbados	10.22	Q
3	Stanly del Carmen	Dominican Republic	10.23	(0.224) Q
4	Julius Morris	Montserrat	10.23	(0.229) q
5	Andre Ford-Azonwanna	Canada	10.35	
6	Josef Norales	Honduras	10.58	
7	Reidis Ramos	Cuba	10.62	

Heat 3
– 7 August
Wind: +1.7 m/s

Rank	Name	Nationality	Time	Notes
1	Beejay Lee	United States	10.23	Q
2	Allistar Clark	Saint Kitts and Nevis	10.27	Q
3	Cruz Rolando Palacios	Honduras	10.37	Q
4	Darrell Wesh	Haiti	10.39	
5	Harold Houston	Bermuda	10.47	
6	Héctor Ruíz	Mexico	10.62	
7	Bryan Brown	Costa Rica	10.89	

Heat 4
– 7 August
Wind: +2.2 m/s

Rank	Name	Nationality	Time	Notes
1	Kemar Hyman	Cayman Islands	10.05 w	Q
2	Remontay McClain	United States	10.15 w	Q
3	Jason Rogers	Saint Kitts and Nevis	10.19 w	Q
4	Emmanuel Callender	Trinidad and Tobago	10.26 w	q
5	Benjamin Williams	Canada	10.31 w	q
6	Mitchel Davis	Dominica	10.58 w	
7	Reginald Koc	Aruba	11.12 w	
8	Linford Avila	Belize	11.19 w	

=== 200 meters ===
Final – 9 August
Wind: +1.8 m/s

Rank	Name	Nationality	Time	Notes
1st place, gold medalist(s)	Rasheed Dwyer	Jamaica	20.12	CR
2nd place, silver medalist(s)	Yancarlos Martínez	Dominican Republic	20.28	
3rd place, bronze medalist(s)	Antoine Adams	Saint Kitts and Nevis	20.47	
4	Julius Morris	Montserrat	20.48	
5	Kyle Greaux	Trinidad and Tobago	20.64	
6	Teray Smith	Bahamas	20.66	
7	Brijesh Lawrence	Saint Kitts and Nevis	21.03	
	Nicholas Deshong	Barbados	DNS	

Semifinals
3 semifinals – Advance 2 on place + 2 on time

Semifinal 1 – 7 August

Rank	Name	Nationality	Time	Notes
1	Kyle Greaux	Trinidad and Tobago	20.47	Q
2	Brijesh Lawrence	Saint Kitts and Nevis	20.66	Q
3	Mario Forsythe	Jamaica	20.73	
4	Burkheart Ellis	Barbados	20.78	
5	Dontae Richards-Kwok	Canada	20.79	
6	Elroy McBride	Bahamas	20.87	
7	Gary Alexander Robinson	Costa Rica	21.00	
8	Shernyl Burns	Montserrat	21.92	

Semifinal 2 – 7 August
Wind: +0.8 m/s

Rank	Name	Nationality	Time	Notes
1	Yancarlos Martínez	Dominican Republic	20.37	Q
2	Julius Morris	Montserrat	20.45	Q
3	Nicholas Deshong	Barbados	20.65	q
4	Oluwasegun Makinde	Canada	20.81	
5	Jared Jarvis	Antigua and Barbuda	21.23	
6	Harold Houston	Bermuda	21.72	
	Cruz Rolando Palacios	Honduras	DQ	Art. 163.3
	Jordan Sartor-Francis	U.S. Virgin Islands	DNS	

Semifinal 3 – 7 August
Wind: +0.8 m/s

Rank	Name	Nationality	Time	Notes
1	Rasheed Dwyer	Jamaica	20.17	Q
2	Antoine Adams	Saint Kitts and Nevis	20.59	Q
3	Teray Smith	Bahamas	20.63	q
4	Ameer Webb	United States	20.91	
5	Yohandris Andújar	Dominican Republic	20.98	
6	Héctor Ruíz	Mexico	20.54	
	Dan-Neil Telesford	Trinidad and Tobago	DQ	Art. 163.3
	Josef Norales	Honduras	DNS	

Heats
5 heats – Advance 4 on place + 4 on time

Heat 1
– 7 August
Wind: +1.5 m/s

Rank	Name	Nationality	Time	Notes
1	Yancarlos Martínez	Dominican Republic	20.31	Q
2	Julius Morris	Montserrat	20.50	Q
3	Kyle Greaux	Trinidad and Tobago	20.62	q
4	Nicholas Deshong	Barbados	20.77	q
5	Oluwasegun Makinde	Canada	20.84	q
6	Brian Slater	U.S. Virgin Islands	22.92	

Heat 2
– 7 August
Wind: -0.2 m/s

Rank	Name	Nationality	Time	Notes
1	Teray Smith	Bahamas	20.64	Q
2	Brijesh Lawrence	Saint Kitts and Nevis	20.93	Q
3	Gary Alexander Robinson	Costa Rica	21.14	q
4	Jared Jarvis	Antigua and Barbuda	21.16	q
5	Josef Norales	Honduras	21.57	q

Heat 3
– 7 August
Wind: +0.8 m/s

Rank	Name	Nationality	Time	Notes
1	Rasheed Dwyer	Jamaica	20.68	Q
2	Yohandris Andújar	Dominican Republic	20.89	Q
3	Antoine Adams	Saint Kitts and Nevis	21.00	q
4	Harold Houston	Bermuda	21.26	q
5	Héctor Ruíz	Mexico	21.46	q
6	Mark Anthony Anderson	Belize	22.19	q
7	Michael Rasmijn	Aruba	22.54	

Heat 4
– 7 August
Wind: +3.5 m/s

Rank	Name	Nationality	Time	Notes
1	Dontae Richards-Kwok	Canada	20.59 w	Q
2	Mario Forsythe	Jamaica	20.61 w	Q
3	Cruz Rolando Palacios	Honduras	20.72 w	q
4	Elroy McBride	Bahamas	20.95 w	q
5	Marcus Vilme	Haiti	22.79 w	
6	Reginald Koc	Aruba	23.05 w	

Heat 5
– 7 August
Wind: +2.0 m/s

Rank	Name	Nationality	Time	Notes
1	Ameer Webb	United States	20.67	Q
2	Burkheart Ellis	Barbados	20.81	Q
3	Dan-Neil Telesford	Trinidad and Tobago	20.96	q
4	Jordan Sartor-Francis	U.S. Virgin Islands	21.31	q
5	Shernyl Burns	Montserrat	21.73	q
6	Ricky François	Haiti	22.78	
	Mitchel Davis	Dominica	DQ	ART. 163.3

=== 400 meters ===
Final – 8 August

Rank	Name	Nationality	Time	Notes
1st place, gold medalist(s)	Lalonde Gordon	Trinidad and Tobago	44.89	
2nd place, silver medalist(s)	Nery Brenes	Costa Rica	45.22	
3rd place, bronze medalist(s)	Ricardo Chambers	Jamaica	45.37	
4	Yoandys Lescay	Cuba	45.62	
5	Gustavo Cuesta	Dominican Republic	45.99	
6	Philip Osei	Canada	46.02	
7	Alonzo Russell	Bahamas	46.20	
8	Yon Soriano	Dominican Republic	46.53	

Semifinals
3 semifinals – Advance 2 on place + 2 on time

Semifinal 1 – 7 August

Rank	Name	Nationality	Time	Notes
1	Nery Brenes	Costa Rica	44.80	Q
2	Ricardo Chambers	Jamaica	44.93	Q
3	James Harris	United States	45.24	
4	Khari Herbert	British Virgin Islands	46.31	
5	Andretti Bain	Bahamas	46.81	
6	George Erazo	El Salvador	48.44	
7	Michael Rasmijn	Aruba	48.53	

Semifinal 2 – 7 August

Rank	Name	Nationality	Time	Notes
1	Alonzo Russell	Bahamas	45.65	Q
2	Yon Soriano	Dominican Republic	45.66	Q
3	Marcus Chambers	United States	45.96	
4	Williams Collazo	Cuba	46.30	
5	Javere Bell	Jamaica	46.60	
6	Tacumar Sterling	Trinidad and Tobago	47.08	
7	Zachary Joseph	Haiti	55.64	

Semifinal 3 – 7 August

Rank	Name	Nationality	Time	Notes
1	Lalonde Gordon	Trinidad and Tobago	44.64	Q CR
2	Gustavo Cuesta	Dominican Republic	45.09	Q
3	Yoandys Lescay	Cuba	45.13	q
4	Philip Osei	Canada	45.23	q
5	Lestrod Roland	Saint Kitts and Nevis	46.30	
6	Brandon Valentine-Parris	Saint Vincent and the Grenadines	46.38	
7	Ricky François	Haiti	50.49	

=== 800 meters ===
Final – 9 August

Rank	Name	Nationality	Time	Notes
1st place, gold medalist(s)	Ryan Martin	United States	1:45.79	CR
2nd place, silver medalist(s)	Clayton Murphy	United States	1:46.38	
3rd place, bronze medalist(s)	Jamaal James	Trinidad and Tobago	1:47.07	
4	Ricardo Cunningham	Jamaica	1:47.14	
5	Corey Bellemore	Canada	1:47.68	
6	Anthonio Mascoll	Barbados	1:48.18	
7	Aaron Evans	Bermuda	1:49.07	
8	Lester Taylor	Bahamas	1:53.31	

Semifinals
3 semifinals – Advance 2 on place + 2 on time

Semifinal 1 – 7 August

Rank	Name	Nationality	Time	Notes
1	Clayton Murphy	United States	1:50.54	Q
2	Jamaal James	Trinidad and Tobago	1:50.69	Q
3	Lester Taylor	Bahamas	1:51.10	q
4	Corey Bellemore	Canada	1:51.13	q

Semifinal 2 – 7 August

Rank	Name	Nationality	Time	Notes
1	Ryan Martin	United States	1:50.49	Q
2	Aaron Evans	Bermuda	1:50.85	Q
3	Moïse Joseph	Haiti	1:51.36	
4	Michael James	Saint Lucia	1:53.29	
5	Víctor Ortiz	Costa Rica	1:53.80	
6	Justice Dreischor	Aruba	2:01.63	

Semifinal 3 – 7 August

Rank	Name	Nationality	Time	Notes
1	Anthonio Mascoll	Barbados	1:51.58	Q
2	Ricardo Cunningham	Jamaica	1:52.79	Q
3	Nicholas Landeau	Trinidad and Tobago	1:53.20	
4	Marbeq Edgar	Saint Lucia	1:54.48	
5	David Hodgson	Costa Rica	1:57.59	

=== 1500 meters ===
Final – 8 August

Rank	Name	Nationality	Time	Notes
1st place, gold medalist(s)	Andrew Wheating	United States	3:45.08	CR
2nd place, silver medalist(s)	Daniel Winn	United States	3:45.43	
3rd place, bronze medalist(s)	Daniel Gorman	Canada	3:46.73	
4	Georman Rivas	Costa Rica	3:56.03	
5	Álvaro Vásquez	Nicaragua	3:59.93	
6	Justice Dreischor	Aruba	4:19.01	

=== 5000 meters ===
Final – 8 August

Rank	Name	Nationality	Time	Notes
1st place, gold medalist(s)	Lopez Lomong	United States	13:57.53	CR
2nd place, silver medalist(s)	José Juan Esparza	Mexico	14:03.81	
3rd place, bronze medalist(s)	Fabián Guerrero	Mexico	14:06.64	
4	Mark Henri Allen	Haiti	15:01.53	
5	Gustavo Mora	Costa Rica	15:07.08	
6	Williams Sánchez	El Salvador	15:57.99	
7	Ronald Starring	Aruba	16:08.98	
	Jeffrey See	United States	DNF	

=== 110 meters hurdles ===
Final – 8 August
Wind: +1.5 m/s

Rank	Name	Nationality	Time	Notes
1st place, gold medalist(s)	Mikel Thomas	Trinidad and Tobago	13.23	CR
2nd place, silver medalist(s)	Jhoanis Portilla	Cuba	13.30	
3rd place, bronze medalist(s)	Eddie Lovett	U.S. Virgin Islands	13.31	
4	Tyler Mason	Jamaica	13.32	
5	Greggmar Swift	Barbados	13.40	
6	Ray Stewart	United States	13.50	
7	Deuce Carter	Jamaica	13.66	
8	Ingvar Moseley	Canada	13.75	

Semifinals
2 semifinals – Advance 3 on place + 2 on time

Semifinal 1 – 7 August
Wind: +1.2 m/s

Rank	Name	Nationality	Time	Notes
1	Mikel Thomas	Trinidad and Tobago	13.43	Q
2	Tyler Mason	Jamaica	13.46	Q
3	Greggmar Swift	Barbados	13.52	Q
4	Ingvar Moseley	Canada	13.65	q
5	Jeffrey Julmis	Haiti	13.67	
6	Ronald Forbes	Cayman Islands	13.77	

Semifinal 2 – 7 August
Wind: +1.6 m/s

Rank	Name	Nationality	Time	Notes
1	Eddie Lovett	U.S. Virgin Islands	13.46	Q
2	Jhoanis Portilla	Cuba	13.47	Q
3	Deuce Carter	Jamaica	13.49	Q
4	Ray Stewart	United States	13.59	q
5	Ramón Sosa	Dominican Republic	13.80	
6	Ruebin Walters	Trinidad and Tobago	13.90	
7	Josué Louis	Haiti	14.74	

=== 400 meters hurdles ===
Final – 9 August

Rank	Name	Nationality	Time	Notes
1st place, gold medalist(s)	Javier Culson	Puerto Rico	48.70	CR
2nd place, silver medalist(s)	José Luis Gaspar	Cuba	49.67	
3rd place, bronze medalist(s)	Trevor Brown	United States	49.88	
4	Emanuel Mayers	Trinidad and Tobago	49.95	
5	Félix Sánchez	Dominican Republic	50.23	
6	Javarn Gallimore	Jamaica	50.59	
7	Gerald Drummond	Costa Rica	50.63	
8	Juander Santos	Dominican Republic	50.79	

Semifinals
2 semifinals – Advance 3 on place + 2 on time

Semifinal 1 – 7 August

Rank	Name	Nationality	Time	Notes
1	Javier Culson	Puerto Rico	49.65	Q
2	Emanuel Mayers	Trinidad and Tobago	50.49	Q
3	Gerald Drummond	Costa Rica	50.53	Q
4	Juander Santos	Dominican Republic	50.55	q

Semifinal 2 – 7 August

Rank	Name	Nationality	Time	Notes
1	Trevor Brown	United States	50.31	Q
2	Javarn Gallimore	Jamaica	50.56	Q
3	José Luis Gaspar	Cuba	50.61	Q
4	Félix Sánchez	Dominican Republic	51.28	q
5	Alie Beauvais	Haiti	51.36	
6	George Erazo	El Salvador	54.50	

=== 3000 meters steeplechase ===
Final – 9 August

Rank	Name	Nationality	Time	Notes
1st place, gold medalist(s)	Andrew Bayer	United States	8:44.88	
2nd place, silver medalist(s)	Stanley Kebenei	United States	8:52.82	
3rd place, bronze medalist(s)	Christopher Dulhanty	Canada	9:01.44	
4	Álvaro Abreu	Dominican Republic	9:07.77	
5	Álvaro Vásquez	Nicaragua	9:28.93	
6	David Alexander Escobar	El Salvador	10:01.92	

=== 4 × 100 meters relay ===
Final – 9 August

Rank	Nation	Competitors	Time	Notes
1st place, gold medalist(s)	Jamaica	Mario Forsythe; Jason Livermore; Oshane Bailey; Sheldon Mitchell	38.07	CR
2nd place, silver medalist(s)	United States	Trell Kimmons; Harry Adams; Beejay Lee; Remontay McClain	38.45	
3rd place, bronze medalist(s)	Barbados	Levi Cadogan; Ramon Gittens; Nicholas Deshong; Burkheart Ellis	38.55	
4	Dominican Republic	Mayobanex de Oleo; Yohandris Andújar; Stanly del Carmen; Yancarlos Martínez	38.78	
5	Trinidad and Tobago	Mikel Thomas; Kyle Greaux; Emmanuel Callender; Dan-Neil Telesford	38.90	
6	Saint Kitts and Nevis	Jason Rogers; Brijesh Lawrence; Allistar Clark; Antoine Adams	39.20	
7	Canada	Ingvar Moseley; Oluwasegun Makinde; Dontae Richards-Kwok; Andre Ford-Azonwanna	39.30	
8	Bahamas	Warren Fraser; Teray Smith; Johnathan Farquharson; Trevorvano Mackey	40.33	
	Belize	James Bregal; Mark Anthony Anderson; Linford Avila; Kenneth Blackett	DQ	Art. 170.7

=== 4 × 400 meters relay ===
Final – 9 August

Rank	Nation	Competitors	Time	Notes
1st place, gold medalist(s)	United States	Clayton Parros; Calvin Smith; Marcus Chambers; James Harris	3:00.07	CR
2nd place, silver medalist(s)	Bahamas	LaToy Williams; Alonzo Russell; Wesley Neymour; Ramon Miller	3:00.53	
3rd place, bronze medalist(s)	Cuba	Williams Collazo; Adrián Chacón; Osmaidel Pellicier; Yoandys Lescay	3:01.22	
4	Dominican Republic	Gustavo Cuesta; Luguelín Santos; Joel Mejía; Yon Soriano	3:01.73	
5	Jamaica	Nicholas Maitland; Sheldon Mitchell; Riker Hylton; Jason Livermore	3:06.79	
6	Costa Rica	Gary Alexander Robinson; Nery Brenes; Gerald Drummond; David Hodgson	3:07.34	

=== High jump ===
Final – 7 August

Rank	Name	Nationality	Attempts							Result	Notes
Rank	Name	Nationality	2.00	2.05	2.10	2.15	2.20	2.25	2.31	Result	Notes
1st place, gold medalist(s)	Jacorian Duffield	United States	–	–	o	o	o	o	xxx	2.25	CR
2nd place, silver medalist(s)	Trevor Barry	Bahamas	–	–	–	–	o	xxx		2.20	
3rd place, bronze medalist(s)	Ryan Ingraham	Bahamas	–	–	–	xo	xo	xxx		2.20	
4	Jesse Williams	United States	–	–	o	o	xxx			2.15	
5	Brandon Williams	Dominica	o	o	xo	o	xxx			2.15	
6	Jah-Nhai Perinchief	Bermuda	o	xo	o	o	xxx			2.15	
7	Sergio Mestre	Cuba	–	–	xxo	xo	xxx			2.15	
8	Arturo Abascal	Mexico	–	xo	xxx					2.05	
9	Josué Louis	Haiti	xxo	xxx						2.00	

=== Pole vault ===
Final – 8 August

Rank	Name	Nationality	Attempts					Result	Notes
Rank	Name	Nationality	4.55	4.70	4.85	5.15	5.30	Result	Notes
1st place, gold medalist(s)	Natan Rivera	El Salvador	o	xo	xxx			4.70	
	Abbey Alcon	Dominican Republic	xxx					NH	
	Lázaro Borges	Cuba	–	–	–	xxx		NH	
	Pedro Daniel Figueroa	El Salvador	x-	xx				NH	
	Nick Mossberg	United States	–	–	–	xxx		NH	
	Brad Walker	United States	–	–	–	–	xxx	NH	

=== Long jump ===
Final – 8 August

Rank	Name	Nationality	Attempts						Result	Notes
Rank	Name	Nationality	1	2	3	4	5	6	Result	Notes
1st place, gold medalist(s)	Cameron Burrell	United States	8.01 (1.8)	x	7.86 (0.3)	8.06 (-0.4)	8.00 (-0.6)	x	8.06 (-0.4 m/s)	CR
2nd place, silver medalist(s)	Kamal Fuller	Jamaica	x	7.31 w (3.2)	7.90 w (2.4)	7.43 (0.1)	7.71 (-1.2)	7.88 (2.0)	7.90 w (+2.4 m/s)	
3rd place, bronze medalist(s)	Ifeanyichukwu Otuonye	Turks and Caicos Islands	7.49 w (4.1)	7.71 (1.1)	7.24 (0.9)	7.66 (0.1)	x	7.44 (-0.5)	7.71 (+1.1 m/s)	
4	Damarcus Simpson	United States	x	7.41 w (2.7)	x	7.25 (0.5)	7.59 (0.2)	x	7.59 (+0.2 m/s)	
5	Kyron Blaise	Trinidad and Tobago	x	7.34 w (3.0)	7.56 w (2.2)	x	6.93 (-0.9)	x	7.56 w (+2.2 m/s)	
6	Quincy Breell	Aruba	x	7.52 w (2.2)	742 w (2.9)	7.43 (-1.0)	x	7.30 (0.1)	7.52 w (+2.2 m/s)	
7	Bavon Sylvain	Dominica	x	7.50 w (3.0)	6.85 w (2.3)	x	x	7.45 (0.2)	7.50 w (+3.0 m/s)	
8	Leon Hunt	U.S. Virgin Islands	7.48 w (3.2)	x	7.46 w (5.3)	x	x	x	7.48 w (+3.2 m/s)	
9	Muhammad Taqi Abdul-Halim	U.S. Virgin Islands	7.36 (1.6)	x	7.30 w (2.2)				7.36 (+1.6 m/s)	
10	Shamar Rock	Barbados	x	7.29 w (4.7)	x				7.29 w (+4.7 m/s)	
11	Kevin Philbert	Curaçao	x	7.20 (1.4)	7.02 w (2.6)				7.20 (+1.4 m/s)	
12	Dwaine Herbert	Trinidad and Tobago	6.81 w (2.3)	6.69 (0.2)	6.84 (-0.5)				6.84 (-0.5 m/s)	
13	Jason Castro	Honduras	6.47 w (4.4)	6.55 w (2.7)	6.66 (0.4)				6.66 (+0.4 m/s)	

=== Triple jump ===
Final – 7 August

Rank	Name	Nationality	Attempts						Result	Notes
Rank	Name	Nationality	1	2	3	4	5	6	Result	Notes
1st place, gold medalist(s)	Yordanys Durañona	Dominica	16.58 (1.8)	16.78 (0.4)	16.76 (0.1)	16.87 (1.6)	16.98 (1.4)	16.86 (0.3)	16.98 (+1.4 m/s)	CR
2nd place, silver medalist(s)	Josh Honeycutt	United States	x	15.42 w (2.4)	16.06 (1.7)	x	16.34 (0.4)	16.57 w (2.2)	16.57 w (+2.2 m/s)	
3rd place, bronze medalist(s)	Leevan Sands	Bahamas	x	x	16.20 (1.0)	16.49 (1.2)	16.49 (0.3)	16.53 (0.2)	16.53 (+0.2 m/s)	
4	Samyr Lainé	Haiti	16.00 (1.5)	x	16.38 w (2.6)	15.99 (1.9)	16.34 w (2.9)	16.12 (-1.1)	16.38 w (+2.6 m/s)	
5	Andy Díaz	Cuba	x	16.03 w (3.1)	–	x	–	–	16.03 w (+3.1 m/s)	
6	Elton Walcott	Trinidad and Tobago	16.00 w (2.2)	x	15.90 (1.7)	x	–	–	16.00 w (+2.2 m/s)	
7	Alphonso Jordan	United States	15.92 w (2.6)	x	15.82 (1.6)	x	–	–	15.92 w (+2.6 m/s)	
8	Jason Castro	Honduras	15.38 (-0.2)	15.52 (0.2)	15.70 (0.9)	15.57 (1.1)	15.46 w (2.2)	x	15.70 (+0.9 m/s)	
9	Steve Waithe	Trinidad and Tobago	15.67 w (2.4)	15.34 (-1.5)	x				15.67 w (+2.4 m/s)	
10	Kenneth Blackett	Belize	x	13.82 (0.8)	14.03 w (2.5)				14.03 (+1.6 m/s)	
11	Brandon Terrell Jones	Belize	x	x	x				NM	

=== Shot put ===
Final – 9 August

Rank	Name	Nationality	Attempts						Result	Notes
Rank	Name	Nationality	1	2	3	4	5	6	Result	Notes
1st place, gold medalist(s)	Jonathan Jones	United States	19.68	20.54	x	19.77	x	x	20.54	CR
2nd place, silver medalist(s)	Darrell Hill	United States	x	19.26	x	x	19.67	18.93	19.67	
3rd place, bronze medalist(s)	Raymond Brown	Jamaica	18.35	18.44	19.28	x	19.26	18.51	19.28	
4	Dillon Simon	Dominica	18.30	18.69	18.34	18.43	x	18.52	18.69	
5	Eldread Henry	British Virgin Islands	16.40	16.84	17.50	17.58	18.49	17.19	18.49	
6	Ashinia Miller	Jamaica	18.31	18.35	18.25	x	18.05	18.16	18.35	
7	Hezekiel Romeo	Trinidad and Tobago	16.84	17.10	x	17.32	17.43	16.96	17.43	
8	Mario Cota	Mexico	16.76	17.21	16.83	16.87	x	x	17.21	
9	Mario McKenzie	Costa Rica	13.34	12.10	13.30				13.34	
10	Shane Nedd	Aruba	x	11.83	11.64				11.83	

=== Discus throw ===
Final – 7 August

Rank	Name	Nationality	Attempts						Result	Notes
Rank	Name	Nationality	1	2	3	4	5	6	Result	Notes
1st place, gold medalist(s)	Russ Winger	United States	59.04	59.90	56.04	60.11	58.96	60.68	60.68	CR
2nd place, silver medalist(s)	Andrew Evans	United States	59.07	x	54.96	58.65	59.32	x	59.32	
3rd place, bronze medalist(s)	Quincy Wilson	Trinidad and Tobago	52.62	x	52.63	x	56.31	56.82	56.82	
4	Dillon Simon	Dominica	55.70	53.69	54.01	54.24	54.77	x	55.70	
5	Mario Cota	Mexico	52.41	53.94	53.29	51.75	x	54.76	54.76	
6	Eldread Henry	British Virgin Islands	x	52.82	x	x	x	x	52.82	
7	Caniggia Raynor	Jamaica	51.11	x	x	x	50.52	49.35	51.11	
8	Emmanuel Stewart	Trinidad and Tobago	x	48.78	x	47.26	50.39	x	50.39	
9	Mario McKenzie	Costa Rica	47.88	46.89	47.20				47.88	
10	Winston Campbell	Honduras	47.39	x	44.34				47.39	

=== Hammer throw ===
Final – 9 August

Rank	Name	Nationality	Attempts						Result	Notes
Rank	Name	Nationality	1	2	3	4	5	6	Result	Notes
1st place, gold medalist(s)	Roberto Janet	Cuba	72.58	72.34	x	x	71.93	72.72	72.72	CR
2nd place, silver medalist(s)	Colin Dunbar	United States	x	70.14	x	71.74	x	x	71.74	
3rd place, bronze medalist(s)	Diego del Real	Mexico	66.23	68.86	69.49	67.30	68.93	70.83	70.83	
4	James Lambert	United States	68.15	70.53	70.02	69.35	x	69.56	70.53	
5	Roberto Sawyers	Costa Rica	70.42	67.59	67.30	68.80	x	64.38	70.42	
6	Reinier Mejías	Cuba	x	x	x	x	68.16	x	68.16	
7	Diego Berríos	Guatemala	59.63	61.67	61.59	62.57	61.48	x	62.57	
8	Caniggia Raynor	Jamaica	55.41	x	x	27.93	58.69	x	58.69	

=== Javelin throw ===
Final – 9 August

Rank	Name	Nationality	Attempts						Result	Notes
Rank	Name	Nationality	1	2	3	4	5	6	Result	Notes
1st place, gold medalist(s)	Riley Dolezal	United States	76.25	x	74.00	79.30	75.78	78.58	79.30	CR
2nd place, silver medalist(s)	Guillermo Martínez	Cuba	78.15	74.89	74.50	73.60	74.49	72.97	78.15	
3rd place, bronze medalist(s)	Albert Reynolds	Saint Lucia	70.24	x	77.71	71.48	72.80	70.80	77.71	
4	Osmani Laffita	Cuba	75.02	x	76.59	x	x	75.32	76.59	
5	Shakeil Waithe	Trinidad and Tobago	69.51	70.38	72.16	70.61	73.44	x	73.44	
6	Orrin Powell	Jamaica	68.88	x	x	66.58	62.43	66.88	68.88	
7	Orlando Thomas	Jamaica	59.48	x	61.61	x	65.06	66.99	66.99	
8	Andre Bazil	Dominica	55.90	60.19	x	59.47	60.87	58.22	60.87	
9	Erick Méndez	Costa Rica	54.40	49.53	45.26				54.40	

== Women's results ==
=== 100 meters ===
Final – 8 August
Wind: -0.1 m/s

Rank	Name	Nationality	Time	Notes
1st place, gold medalist(s)	Barbara Pierre	United States	11.12	
2nd place, silver medalist(s)	Charonda Williams	United States	11.21	
3rd place, bronze medalist(s)	Michelle-Lee Ahye	Trinidad and Tobago	11.22	
4	Tahesia Harrigan-Scott	British Virgin Islands	11.28	
5	Samantha Henry-Robinson	Jamaica	11.45	
6	Celiangeli Morales	Puerto Rico	11.47	
7	Laverne Jones-Ferrette	U.S. Virgin Islands	11.53	
8	Reyare Thomas	Trinidad and Tobago	11.54	

Semifinals
3 semifinals – Advance 2 on place + 2 on time

Semifinal 1 – 7 August
Wind: +1.2 m/s

Rank	Name	Nationality	Time	Notes
1	Barbara Pierre	United States	11.08	Q
2	Reyare Thomas	Trinidad and Tobago	11.25	Q
3	Ashley Marshall	Barbados	11.52	(0.516)
4	Tayla Carter	Bahamas	11.52	(0.520)
5	Margarita Manzueta	Dominican Republic	11.53	
6	Virgil Hodge	Saint Kitts and Nevis	11.62	

Semifinal 2 – 7 August
Wind: +2.3 m/s

Rank	Name	Nationality	Time	Notes
1	Michelle-Lee Ahye	Trinidad and Tobago	10.98 w	Q
2	Charonda Williams	United States	11.06 w	Q
3	Laverne Jones-Ferrette	U.S. Virgin Islands	11.31 w	q
4	Genoiska Cancel	Puerto Rico	11.47 w	
5	Jellisa Westney	Canada	11.52 w	
6	Nargelis Statia	Curaçao	11.90 w	
	Shimayra Williams	Jamaica	FS w	

Semifinal 3 – 7 August
Wind: +1.4 m/s

Rank	Name	Nationality	Time	Notes
1	Samantha Henry-Robinson	Jamaica	11.01	Q CR
2	Tahesia Harrigan-Scott	British Virgin Islands	11.21	Q
3	Celiangeli Morales	Puerto Rico	11.45	q
4	Sharolyn Josephs	Costa Rica	11.61	
5	Shenel Crooke	Saint Kitts and Nevis	11.65	
6	Tameran Defreitas	Canada	11.80	

=== 200 meters ===
Final – 9 August
Wind: +1.3 m/s

Rank	Name	Nationality	Time	Notes
1st place, gold medalist(s)	Kyra Jefferson	United States	22.50	CR
2nd place, silver medalist(s)	Semoy Hackett	Trinidad and Tobago	22.51	
3rd place, bronze medalist(s)	Dezerea Bryant	United States	22.58	
4	Kerron Stewart	Jamaica	22.80	
5	Celiangeli Morales	Puerto Rico	23.03	
6	Jodean Williams	Jamaica	23.12	
7	Kamaria Durant	Trinidad and Tobago	23.15	
8	Laverne Jones-Ferrette	U.S. Virgin Islands	23.51	

Semifinals
3 semifinals – Advance 2 on place + 2 on time

Semifinal 1 – 7 August
Wind: -0.5 m/s

Rank	Name	Nationality	Time	Notes
1	Semoy Hackett	Trinidad and Tobago	22.59	Q
2	Kyra Jefferson	United States	23.10	Q
3	Laverne Jones-Ferrette	U.S. Virgin Islands	23.50	q
4	Ashley Kelly	British Virgin Islands	23.82	
5	Sharolyn Josephs	Costa Rica	23.96	
6	Margarita Manzueta	Dominican Republic	24.48	
7	Nargelis Statia	Curaçao	24.71	

Semifinal 2 – 7 August
Wind: +0.5 m/s

Rank	Name	Nationality	Time	Notes
1	Dezerea Bryant	United States	23.12	Q
2	Celiangeli Morales	Puerto Rico	23.30	(0.298) Q
3	Jodean Williams	Jamaica	23.30	(0.299) q
4	Arialis Gandulla	Cuba	23.82	
5	Jellisa Westney	Canada	24.03	
6	Samantha Edwards	Antigua and Barbuda	24.20	

Semifinal 3 – 7 August
Wind: -0.4 m/s

Rank	Name	Nationality	Time	Notes
1	Kerron Stewart	Jamaica	23.13	Q
2	Kamaria Durant	Trinidad and Tobago	23.44	Q
3	Carol Rodríguez	Puerto Rico	23.85	
4	Carmiesha Cox	Bahamas	23.96	
5	Tameran Defreitas	Canada	24.03	
6	Karene King	British Virgin Islands	24.09	

=== 400 meters ===
Final – 8 August

Rank	Name	Nationality	Time	Notes
1st place, gold medalist(s)	Courtney Okolo	United States	51.57	
2nd place, silver medalist(s)	Karla Funderburk	United States	52.22	
3rd place, bronze medalist(s)	Bobby-Gaye Wilkins-Gooden	Jamaica	52.45	
4	Kineke Alexander	Saint Vincent and the Grenadines	52.51	
5	Lisneidys Veitía	Cuba	53.01	
6	Carol Rodríguez	Puerto Rico	53.61	
7	Christine Amertil	Bahamas	53.86	
8	Sade Sealy	Barbados	54.00	

Semifinals
3 semifinals – Advance 2 on place + 2 on time

Semifinal 1 – 7 August

Rank	Name	Nationality	Time	Notes
1	Courtney Okolo	United States	50.82	Q CR
2	Sade Sealy	Barbados	53.19	Q
3	Lanece Clarke	Bahamas	53.41	
4	Micha Powell	Canada	53.73	
5	Afia Charles	Antigua and Barbuda	54.09	
6	Kim Rossen	Curaçao	58.59	
	Daysiurami Bonne	Cuba	DNF	

Semifinal 2 – 7 August

Rank	Name	Nationality	Time	Notes
1	Bobby-Gaye Wilkins-Gooden	Jamaica	51.79	Q
2	Lisneidys Veitía	Cuba	52.11	Q
3	Kineke Alexander	Saint Vincent and the Grenadines	52.32	q
4	Christine Amertil	Bahamas	52.32	q
5	Samantha Edwards	Antigua and Barbuda	53.55	
6	Jessica James	Trinidad and Tobago	54.69	
7	Sofía Isabel Carías	El Salvador	57.38	

Semifinal 3 – 7 August

Rank	Name	Nationality	Time	Notes
1	Karla Funderburk	United States	51.73	Q
2	Carol Rodríguez	Puerto Rico	52.43	Q
3	Nadia Cummings	Barbados	52.88	
4	Sonikqua Walker	Jamaica	53.26	
5	Romona Modeste	Trinidad and Tobago	54.27	

=== 800 meters ===
Final – 9 August

Rank	Name	Nationality	Time	Notes
1st place, gold medalist(s)	Chanelle Price	United States	2:00.48	CR
2nd place, silver medalist(s)	Gabriela Medina	Mexico	2:02.13	
3rd place, bronze medalist(s)	Kimarra McDonald	Jamaica	2:02.14	
4	Dana Mecke	United States	2:02.23	
5	Gilda Casanova	Cuba	2:06.23	
6	Rachel François	Canada	2:07.35	
7	Aleena Brooks	Trinidad and Tobago	2:09.66	
8	Sonia Gaskin	Barbados	2:10.86	

Semifinals
2 semifinals – Advance 3 on place + 2 on time

Semifinal 1 – 7 August

Rank	Name	Nationality	Time	Notes
1	Kimarra McDonald	Jamaica	2:04.42	Q
2	Dana Mecke	United States	2:04.88	Q
3	Gilda Casanova	Cuba	2:06.74	Q
4	Sonia Gaskin	Barbados	2:07.15	q
5	Cristina Guevara	Mexico	2:07.56	
6	Mónica Vargas	Costa Rica	2:15.64	

Semifinal 2 – 7 August

Rank	Name	Nationality	Time	Notes
1	Chanelle Price	United States	2:04.62	Q
2	Gabriela Medina	Mexico	2:05.04	Q
3	Rachel François	Canada	2:05.74	Q
4	Aleena Brooks	Trinidad and Tobago	2:06.41	q
5	Samantha James	Jamaica	2:09.67	
6	Jennifer Estime	Haiti	2:18.27	

=== 1500 meters ===
Final – 8 August

Rank	Name	Nationality	Time	Notes
1st place, gold medalist(s)	Rachel Schneider	United States	4:14.78	CR
2nd place, silver medalist(s)	Shelby Houlihan	United States	4:16.61	
3rd place, bronze medalist(s)	Cristina Guevara	Mexico	4:24.75	
4	Adriana Múñoz	Cuba	4:24.79	
5	Mónica Vargas	Costa Rica	4:51.73	

=== 5000 meters ===
Final – 9 August

Rank	Name	Nationality	Time	Notes
1st place, gold medalist(s)	Kellyn Taylor	United States	16:24.86	CR
2nd place, silver medalist(s)	Rosa del Toro	El Salvador	17:51.74	
3rd place, bronze medalist(s)	Gabriela Traña	Costa Rica	18:41.98	

=== 100 meters hurdles ===
Final – 8 August
Wind: +4.1 m/s

Rank	Name	Nationality	Time	Notes
1st place, gold medalist(s)	Lolo Jones	United States	12.63 w	
2nd place, silver medalist(s)	Tenaya Jones	United States	12.68 w	
3rd place, bronze medalist(s)	Kierre Beckles	Barbados	12.88 w	
4	Christie Moerman	Canada	12.91 w	
5	LaVonne Idlette	Dominican Republic	13.01 w	
6	Devynne Charlton	Bahamas	13.01 w	
7	Akela Jones	Barbados	13.08 w	
8	Deborah John	Trinidad and Tobago	13.42 w	

Semifinals
3 semifinals – Advance 2 on place + 2 on time

Semifinal 1 – 7 August
Wind: -0.3 m/s

Rank	Name	Nationality	Time	Notes
1	Tenaya Jones	United States	13.05	Q CR
2	Christie Moerman	Canada	13.14	Q
3	Devynne Charlton	Bahamas	13.31	q
4	Belkis Milanes	Cuba	13.52	
5	Beatriz Flamenco	El Salvador	14.53	NR
6	Katy Sealy	Belize	15.35	

Semifinal 2 – 7 August
Wind: +2.5 m/s

Rank	Name	Nationality	Time	Notes
1	Kierre Beckles	Barbados	13.01 w	Q
2	Deborah John	Trinidad and Tobago	13.38 w	Q
3	Nicole Setterington	Canada	13.41 w	
4	Adanaca Brown	Bahamas	14.04 w	
5	Iris Santamaría	El Salvador	14.62 w	
6	Daniela Rojas	Costa Rica	15.57 w	

Semifinal 3 – 7 August
Wind: +2.1 m/s

Rank	Name	Nationality	Time	Notes
1	Lolo Jones	United States	12.82 w	Q
2	Akela Jones	Barbados	13.09 w	Q
3	LaVonne Idlette	Dominican Republic	13.11 w	q
4	Vanessa Jules	Haiti	13.70 w	
5	Gabriela Santos	Mexico	13.74 w	
6	Makeba Alcide	Saint Lucia	13.89 w	

=== 400 meters hurdles ===
Final – 9 August

Rank	Name	Nationality	Time	Notes
1st place, gold medalist(s)	Tiffany Williams	United States	54.35	CR
2nd place, silver medalist(s)	Sparkle McKnight	Trinidad and Tobago	55.41	
3rd place, bronze medalist(s)	Zurian Hechavarría	Cuba	55.97	
4	Noelle Montcalm	Canada	55.98	
5	Samantha Elliott	Jamaica	56.26	
6	Turquoise Thompson	United States	56.41	
7	Zudikey Rodríguez	Mexico	56.64	
8	Wendy Fawn Dorr	Canada	58.67	

Semifinals
2 semifinals – Advance 3 on place + 2 on time

Semifinal 1 – 7 August

Rank	Name	Nationality	Time	Notes
1	Sparkle McKnight	Trinidad and Tobago	56.45	Q
2	Turquoise Thompson	United States	56.67	Q
3	Wendy Fawn Dorr	Canada	57.21	Q
4	Samantha Elliott	Jamaica	57.32	q
5	Katrina Seymour	Bahamas	58.47	
6	Tia-Adana Belle	Barbados	1:01.05	
7	Dessire Bermúdez	Costa Rica	1:01.22	

Semifinal 2 – 7 August

Rank	Name	Nationality	Time	Notes
1	Tiffany Williams	United States	55.85	Q
2	Noelle Montcalm	Canada	57.19	Q
3	Zurian Hechavarría	Cuba	57.24	Q
4	Zudikey Rodríguez	Mexico	57.37	q
5	Rushell Clayton	Jamaica	57.71	
6	Sharolyn Scott	Costa Rica	57.96	
7	Josanne Lucas	Trinidad and Tobago	58.69	

=== 3000 meters steeplechase ===
Final – 9 August

Rank	Name	Nationality	Time	Notes
1st place, gold medalist(s)	Ashley Higginson	United States	9:56.75	CR
2nd place, silver medalist(s)	Shalaya Kipp	United States	10:03.91	
3rd place, bronze medalist(s)	Ana Cristina Narváez	Mexico	10:16.25	
4	Brenda Salmerón	El Salvador	11:34.71	

=== 4 × 100 meters relay ===
Final – 9 August

Rank	Nation	Competitors	Time	Notes
1st place, gold medalist(s)	United States	Barbara Pierre; Lakeisha Lawson; Dezerea Bryant; Kyra Jefferson	42.24	CR
2nd place, silver medalist(s)	Puerto Rico	Beatriz Cruz; Celiangeli Morales; Genoiska Cancel; Carol Rodríguez	43.51	
3rd place, bronze medalist(s)	Trinidad and Tobago	Kamaria Durant; Reyare Thomas; Lisa Wickham; Peli Alzola	44.24	
4	Bahamas	Devynne Charlton; Carmiesha Cox; Tayla Carter; Adanaca Brown	44.28	
5	Canada	Christie Moerman; Jellisa Westney; Nicole Setterington; Tameran Defreitas	45.19	

=== 4 × 400 meters relay ===
Final – 9 August

Rank	Nation	Competitors	Time	Notes
1st place, gold medalist(s)	United States	Kala Funderburk; Charonda Williams; Tiffany Williams; Courtney Okolo	3:25.39	CR
2nd place, silver medalist(s)	Jamaica	Sonikqua Walker; Verone Chambers; Jonique Day; Bobby-Gaye Wilkins-Gooden	3:28.65	
3rd place, bronze medalist(s)	Bahamas	Lanece Clarke; Christine Amertil; Katrina Seymour; Adanaca Brown	3:31.80	
4	Canada	Noelle Montcalm; Rachel François; Micha Powell; Wendy Fawn Dorr	3:33.65	
5	Trinidad and Tobago	Romona Modeste; Sparkle McKnight; Jessica James; Aleena Brooks	3:33.85	
6	Costa Rica	Sharolyn Scott; Dessire Bermúdez; Gina Zambrana; Sharolyn Josephs	3:41.40	

=== High jump ===
Final – 9 August

Rank	Name	Nationality	Attempts											Result	Notes
Rank	Name	Nationality	1.60	1.65	1.70	1.73	1.76	1.79	1.82	1.85	1.88	1.91	1.96	Result	Notes
1st place, gold medalist(s)	Levern Spencer	Saint Lucia	–	–	–	–	–	o	–	o	o	o	xxx	1.91	CR
2nd place, silver medalist(s)	Priscilla Frederick	Antigua and Barbuda	–	–	–	–	o	o	o	o	o	xxx		1.88	
3rd place, bronze medalist(s)	Deandra Daniel	Trinidad and Tobago	–	–	–	o	o	xxo	o	xo	xxx			1.85	
4	Elizabeth Patterson	United States	–	–	–	–	o	xxo	o	xxx				1.82	
5	Vanessa Jules	Haiti	–	–	o	o	o	xo	xxx					1.79	
6	Thea LaFond	Dominica	–	–	o	o	xo	xxx						1.76	
7	Makeba Alcide	Saint Lucia	o	o	o	xxo	xo	xxx						1.76	
8	Wanetta Kirby	U.S. Virgin Islands	o	o	o	o	xxx							1.73	
9	Abigail Obando	Costa Rica	o	o	xxx									1.65	

=== Pole vault ===
Final – 7 August

Rank	Name	Nationality	Attempts										Result	Notes
Rank	Name	Nationality	3.35	3.50	3.65	3.95	4.10	4.20	4.30	4.40	4.50	4.60	Result	Notes
1st place, gold medalist(s)	Kristen Hixson	United States	–	–	–	–	–	o	xxo	o	xxo	xxx	4.50	CR
2nd place, silver medalist(s)	Kelsie Ahbe	Canada	–	–	–	–	–	o	xo	o	xxx		4.40	
3rd place, bronze medalist(s)	Katie Nageotte	United States	–	–	–	–	–	o	o	xxx			4.30	
4	Carmelita Correa	Mexico	–	–	–	o	o	xo	xxx				4.20	
5	Andrea Velasco	El Salvador	xxo	o	xxx								3.50	

=== Long jump ===
Final – 9 August

Rank	Name	Nationality	Attempts						Result	Notes
Rank	Name	Nationality	1	2	3	4	5	6	Result	Notes
1st place, gold medalist(s)	Quanesha Burks	United States	6.69 (-0.3)	6.27 (0.5)	6.93 (2.0)	x	6.68 (0.0)	6.66 (0.6)	6.93 (+2.0 m/s)	CR
2nd place, silver medalist(s)	Chantel Malone	British Virgin Islands	6.69 (0.0)	6.52 w (2.1)	x	6.29 (1.5)	6.42 (1.0)	6.25 (-0.9)	6.69 (+0.0 m/s)	
3rd place, bronze medalist(s)	Sha'Keela Saunders	United States	6.57 (1.7)	6.34 w (2.8)	6.39 w (2.3)	6.53 w (2.6)	6.37 w (2.8)	6.32 (1.2)	6.57 (+1.7 m/s)	
4	Irisdaymi Herrera	Cuba	6.03 w (2.7)	6.40 w (2.7)	6.18 (2.0)	6.23 (1.6)	6.31 (1.3)	6.20 w (2.8)	6.40 w (+2.7 m/s)	
5	Alysbeth Félix	Puerto Rico	x	6.34 w (2.6)	6.10 (0.5)	5.92 (0.1)	4.47 (1.6)	x	6.34 w (+2.6 m/s)	
6	Yilian Durruthy	Cuba	6.15 w (2.3)	6.17 w (2.8)	x	x	x	5.49 (1.8)	6.17 w (+2.8 m/s)	
7	Sandisha Antoine	Saint Lucia	x	5.78 w (2.4)	5.82 w (2.5)	x	6.09 (0.9)	x	6.09 (+0.9 m/s)	
8	Wanetta Kirby	U.S. Virgin Islands	5.85 (1.0)	5.82 (1.8)	5.79 (1.6)	x	x	5.90 (1.0)	5.90 (+1.0 m/s)	
9	Rechelle Meade	Anguilla	5.80 (1.5)	x	x				5.80 (+1.5 m/s)	
10	Daneysha Robinson	Costa Rica	5.00 (1.7)	5.39 (1.2)	5.39 (1.5)				5.39 (+1.2 m/s)	
11	Katy Sealy	Belize	5.01 (-0.8)	x	5.07 (0.7)				5.07 (+0.7 m/s)	
12	Shanicka Augustine	Belize	x	4.91 (1.6)	4.74 (-0.3)				4.91 (+1.6 m/s)	

=== Triple jump ===
Final – 7 August

Rank	Name	Nationality	Attempts						Result	Notes
Rank	Name	Nationality	1	2	3	4	5	6	Result	Notes
1st place, gold medalist(s)	Shanieka Thomas	Jamaica	14.03 w (3.0)	x	14.23 (1.3)	14.19 (1.8)	13.85 (0.0)	13.99 (-0.9)	14.23 (+1.3 m/s)	CR
2nd place, silver medalist(s)	Ana Lucía José	Dominican Republic	13.73 w (4.5)	x	14.03 (0.9)	14.21 w (3.3)	x	x	14.21 w (+3.3 m/s)	
3rd place, bronze medalist(s)	Lynnika Pitts	United States	14.02 w (4.2)	x	x	x	13.82 (1.5)	13.83 w (3.1)	14.02 w (+4.2 m/s)	
4	Tamara Myers	Bahamas	13.65 w (2.2)	13.78 w (3.4)	x	x	x	x	13.78 w (+3.4 m/s)	
5	Ayanna Alexander	Trinidad and Tobago	13.43 w (2.6)	13.57 w (3.7)	x	13.66 w (2.1)	13.68 (2.0)	x	13.68 (+2.0 m/s)	
6	Thea LaFond	Dominica	13.28 (1.6)	13.60 w (2.5)	12.86 w (4.2)	12.55 (-0.3)	x	13.14 w (2.3)	13.60 w (+2.5 m/s)	
7	Sandisha Antoine	Saint Lucia	13.25 (0.6)	13.53 w (2.4)	x	x	13.50 (1.9)	x	13.53 w (+2.4 m/s)	
8	Dailenis Alcántara	Cuba	13.45 w (3.4)	11.95 w (5.1)	13.44 w (2.7)	x	–	–	13.45 w (+3.4 m/s)	
9	Christina Epps	United States	12.81 w (4.0)	–	–				12.81 w (+4.0 m/s)	

=== Shot put ===
Final – 8 August

Rank	Name	Nationality	Attempts						Result	Notes
Rank	Name	Nationality	1	2	3	4	5	6	Result	Notes
1st place, gold medalist(s)	Jillian Camarena-Williams	United States	18.02	18.10	18.29	18.62	17.16	x	18.62	CR
2nd place, silver medalist(s)	Jeneva Stevens	United States	16.99	17.61	x	17.13	17.29	17.11	17.61	
3rd place, bronze medalist(s)	Yaniuvis López	Cuba	x	16.59	16.59	x	16.76	16.55	16.76	
4	Makeba Alcide	Saint Lucia	10.84	11.21	11.87	10.79	11.58	12.02	12.02	
5	Naomi Priscilla Smith	Costa Rica	11.65	10.51	11.58	11.49	10.70	11.38	11.65	

=== Discus throw ===
Final – 7 August

Rank	Name	Nationality	Attempts						Result	Notes
Rank	Name	Nationality	1	2	3	4	5	6	Result	Notes
1st place, gold medalist(s)	Summer Pierson	United States	55.50	53.85	54.75	x	51.24	56.64	56.64	
2nd place, silver medalist(s)	Jaleesa Williams	Trinidad and Tobago	x	x	x	37.06	x	x	37.06	
3rd place, bronze medalist(s)	Alma Guitiérrez	Honduras	35.06	35.52	33.12	33.42	34.64	36.67	36.67	
4	Marelly Balentina	Curaçao	x	14.01	x	x	31.75	32.92	32.92	

=== Hammer throw ===
Final – 8 August

Rank	Name	Nationality	Attempts						Result	Notes
Rank	Name	Nationality	1	2	3	4	5	6	Result	Notes
1st place, gold medalist(s)	Amber Campbell	United States	69.68	70.47	72.41	71.59	71.78	x	72.41	CR
2nd place, silver medalist(s)	DeAnna Price	United States	65.02	67.01	71.27	70.51	x	70.11	71.27	
3rd place, bronze medalist(s)	Yirisleydis Ford	Cuba	68.51	69.91	68.72	x	66.77	x	69.91	
4	Daina Levy	Jamaica	61.79	63.12	68.39	65.46	68.60	61.66	68.60	
5	Ariannis Vichy	Cuba	66.60	66.22	65.93	64.34	63.24	61.00	66.60	
6	Lauren Stuart	Canada	66.15	65.57	x	63.95	61.01	66.02	66.15	
7	Natalie Grant	Jamaica	56.82	53.75	56.33	x	x	x	56.82	

=== Javelin throw ===
Final – 7 August

Rank	Name	Nationality	Attempts						Result	Notes
Rank	Name	Nationality	1	2	3	4	5	6	Result	Notes
1st place, gold medalist(s)	Kara Winger	United States	x	58.55	x	55.52	x	60.34	60.34	CR
2nd place, silver medalist(s)	Yulenmi Aguilar	Cuba	x	56.79	x	x	52.89	55.44	56.79	
3rd place, bronze medalist(s)	Hanna Carson	United States	49.05	x	49.36	50.34	x	x	50.34	
4	Coralys Ortiz	Puerto Rico	x	x	49.81	x	x	x	49.81	
5	Marelly Balentina	Curaçao	x	40.63	41.58	39.89	40.77	x	41.58	
6	Génova Arias	Costa Rica	40.78	x	41.10	38.49	x	41.03	41.10	
