= Clayton Murphy =

American middle-distance runner (born 1995)

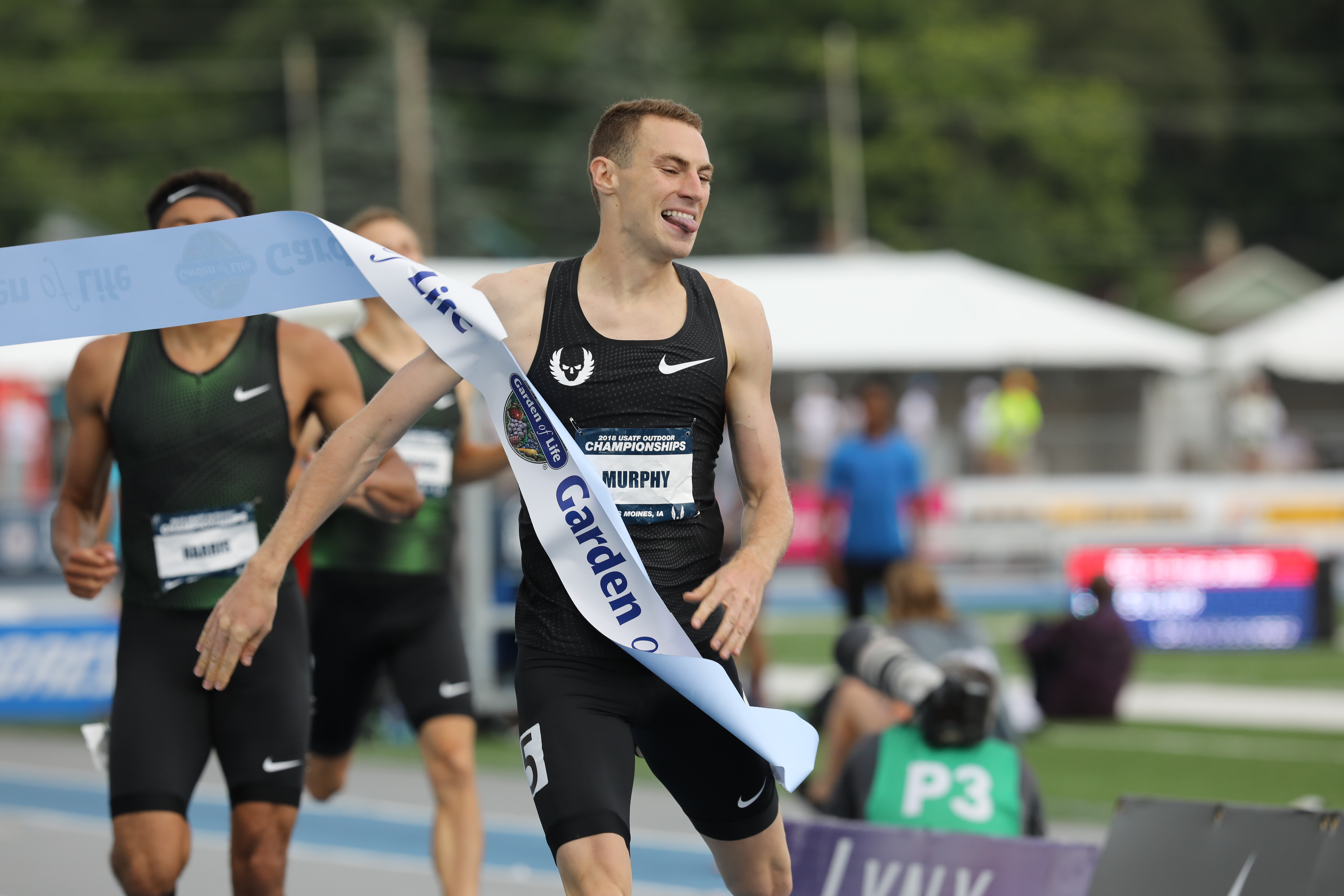
- Murphy in 2018

Personal information
- Born: February 26, 1995 (age 31) Greenville, Ohio, U.S.
- Height: 5 ft 11 in (180 cm)
- Weight: 150 lb (68 kg)

Sport
- Sport: Track
- Events: 800 meters, 1500 meters
- College team: Akron Zips
- Turned pro: Jun. 2016
- Retired: May 2025

Achievements and titles
- Olympic finals: 2016 Rio de Janeiro; 800 m, Bronze; 2020 Tokyo; 800 m, 9th
- World finals: 2015 Beijing; 800 m, 14th (sf); 2019 Doha; 800 m, 8th
- Personal bests: 800 m: 1:42.93 (Rio de Janeiro 2016); 1500 m: 3:36.23 (Portland 2016); Mile: 3:51.99 (Eugene 2017)
Medal record
Men's athletics
Representing United States
Olympic Games
Bronze medal – third place	2016 Rio de Janeiro	800 m
World Relays
Gold medal – first place	2017 Nassau	4 × 800 m relay
Pan American Games
Gold medal – first place	2015 Toronto	800 m
NACAC Championships
Silver medal – second place	2015 Costa Rica	800 m
Representing Americas
Continental Cup
Silver medal – second place	2018 Ostrava	800 m

Clayton Murphy (born February 26, 1995) is an American middle-distance runner. He won the bronze medal in the 800-meter run at the 2016 Olympic Games. He was the gold medalist in the 800-meter run at the 2015 Pan American Games. He ran collegiately for the University of Akron, before signing with Nike in June 2016 and joining the Nike Oregon Project. He retired from competition in May 2025.

== Early life and education ==
Clayton Murphy is the son of Mark and Melinda Murphy. He was raised in New Madison, Ohio. He attended Tri-Village High School and began to take part in track and field and cross country running while there. Murphy broke the Division III state record in the 1600 Meter Run at the 2013 state track meet in Columbus in 4:11.72.

== Collegiate career ==
=== 2014 ===
Murphy enrolled at the University of Akron in fall 2013. He began to train with the Akron Zips college track team. There he was coached by the head distance coach, Lee LaBadie, who is a sub 4-minute miler and a former runner for the University of Illinois. At the 2014 Mid-American Conference (MAC) indoor meet, Murphy won the mile run and was runner-up over 3000 meters. He went on to win the outdoor conference title in the 1500 meters. He ran 3:44.53 for the distance that year to win the Mt. SAC Relays.

=== 2015 ===
He opened the following academic year (2014–15) with a fourth-place finish at the MAC Cross Country Championships, then followed this with an 800 m/mile double at the MAC Indoor meet. In February he ran a personal best and school record of 4:00.39 minutes for the indoor mile run. On his national debut at the 2015 NCAA Division I Indoor Track and Field Championships he claimed third place in the 800 m with a new best time of 1:47.06 minutes. Similar results came outdoors, as he won a middle-distance double at the MAC Outdoor Championships and again placed third at the 2015 NCAA Division I Outdoor Track and Field Championships. He also won the 800 m at the Drake Relays and set a school record of 3:40.69 for the 1500 m.

He placed well the following academic year (2015–16) with a 4th place at Mid American Conference Championships in Cross Country and twentieth place at 2015 NCAA Division I Great Lakes Region Cross Country Championships. Murphy won 2016 Mid-American Conference Indoor Track & Field Championships titles in Distance medley relay, 4 × 400 m relay, Mile, and 800 metres. Murphy won 2016 NCAA Division I Indoor Track and Field Championships in 800 metres. Murphy won 2016 Mid-American Conference Outdoor Track & Field Championships titles in 1500 metres and 800 metres. Murphy won 1500 m at 2016 NCAA Division I Outdoor Track and Field Championships in 3:36.38.

Murphy won 12 Mid-American Conference titles, NCAA Division I 2016 Indoor 800 m title, NCAA Division I 2016 Outdoor 1500 m title and earned 4 NCAA Division I All-American awards.

== National and international career ==
At the end of the college season, he entered the 2015 USA Outdoor Track and Field Championships. He ran personal records in each round and ended the competition in fourth place with a time of 1:45.59 for the 800 m. This earned him selection for the American squad for the Pan American Games. In his international debut – also his first time abroad – he surprised by winning the gold medal some four hundredths ahead of Colombia's Rafith Rodríguez, taking the lead in the final stretch. Murphy's roommate Ryan Martin was also a medalist in the event. Murphy was the first American in more than 15 years to win the title, following on from Johnny Gray's 1999 victory. He earned a silver medal in the 800 meters at the 2015 North American, Central American and Caribbean Championships. This edition, 2015 NACAC Championships were a regional track and field competition held at the Estadio Nacional de Costa Rica in San Jose, Costa Rica from August 7–9, 2015. Murphy finished 12th in 2015 World Championships in Athletics – Men's 800 metres held August 21–25, 2015 in Beijing, China.

He chose to run the 800 meters at the 2016 United States Olympic Trials, which paid off. His fast finish out-sprinted Boris Berian for the win and Olympic team berth in a personal record 1:44.76. He won Bronze in the 800 m at the 2016 Rio Olympics in a new personal record of 1:42.93, the fifth-fastest time ever by an American.

At the 2017 USATF 1 Mile Road Championships, Murphy finished first with a time of 4:00.0. He chose to compete in the 800 meters at the 2017 USA Outdoor Track and Field Championships then compete in the 1500 meters at the same championships and ran 1:45.70 to make the final, but did not start in the 800 meters final after an injury in the 1500 meters final where he finished in 3:50.55 to place 13th in the 1500 meters. He joined Nike Oregon Project in August 2017 and moved to Portland in the Fall 2017 to train at the Nike headquarters with Matthew Centrowitz, the Rio Olympic gold medalist over 1500 m. Murphy won the 2020 Olympic Trials 800 m in 1:43.17 to make his second Olympic team. In May 2025, he announced his retirement.

== International results ==
Year	Competition	Venue	Position	Event	Notes
2015	Pan American Games	Toronto, Canada	1st	800 m	1:47.19
2015	NACAC Championships	San José, Costa Rica	2nd	800 m	1:46.38
2015	World Championships	Beijing, China	14th (sf)	800 m	1:46.28
2016	Olympic Games	Rio de Janeiro, Brazil	3rd	800 m	1:42.93
2017	IAAF World Relays	Nassau, Bahamas	1st	4 × 800 m relay	7:13.16
2019	World Championships	Doha, Qatar	8th	800 m	1:47.84
2021	Olympic Games	Tokyo, Japan	9th	800 m	1:46.53
2023	World Championships	Budapest, Hungary	33rd (h)	800 m	1:47.06

== Personal life ==
Murphy met fellow Olympian Ariana Washington over a game of Uno at the USA Track and Field Athletes Lounge in the Olympic Village at the 2016 Summer Games in Rio. They got engaged in 2018, and were married in the Napa Valley on December 7, 2019.

== See also ==
- List of 2015 Pan American Games medal winners
