= Ricardo Cunningham =

Jamaican middle-distance runner

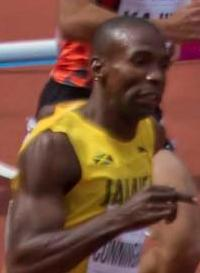

Personal information
- Born: 10 April 1982 (age 44) Westmoreland, Jamaica
- Height: 1.85 m (6 ft 1 in)
- Weight: 78 kg (172 lb)

Sport
- Sport: Athletics
- Events: 400 m hurdles, 800 m

Ricardo Cunningham (born 10 April 1982) is a Jamaican middle-distance runner turned 400 metres hurdler. He represented his country at the 2017 World Championships as well as the 2015 Pan American Games and two Commonwealth Games.

== International competitions ==
Year	Competition	Venue	Position	Event	Notes
Representing Jamaica
2005	Central American and Caribbean Championships	Nassau, Bahamas	5th	800 m	1:50.89
2009	Central American and Caribbean Championships	Havana, Cuba	4th	800 m	1:47.98
2010	Central American and Caribbean Games	Mayagüez, Puerto Rico	9th (h)	800 m	1:49.87
2010	Commonwealth Games	Delhi, India	18th (h)	800 m	1:52.65
2010	Commonwealth Games	Delhi, India	7th (h)	4 × 400 m relay	3:06.30^{1}
2013	Central American and Caribbean Championships	Morelia, Mexico	2nd	800 m	1:49.97
2014	Commonwealth Games	Glasgow, United Kingdom	10th (sf)	800 m	1:47.80
2015	Pan American Games	Toronto, Canada	4th	800 m	1:48.65
2015	NACAC Championships	San José, Costa Rica	4th	800 m	1:47.14
2017	World Championships	London, United Kingdom	20th (sf)	400 m hurdles	50.54
2018	Commonwealth Games	Gold Coast, Australia	15th (h)	400 m hurdles	50.68

^{1}Disqualified in the final

== Personal bests ==
Outdoor

- 200 metres – 22.85 (Kingston 2012)
- 400 metres – 46.21 (Uwi mona Kingston)2O12
- 800 metres – 1:47.14 (San José 2015)
- 1500 metres – 4:02.66 (Kingston 2014)
- 400 metres hurdles – 48.83 (Kingston 2017)

Indoor

- 800 metres – 1:51.46 (Boston 2003)
- 1000 metres – 2:29.04 (Fairfax 2005)
