= Samantha Edwards (athlete) =

Antigua and Barbuda sprinter

Personal information
- Born: 14 January 1990 (age 36) Elmont, New York, United States
- Education: Virginia State University

Sport
- Sport: Athletics
- Event: 400 m
- College team: Virginia State Trojans

Samantha Edwards (born 14 January 1990) is an Antigua and Barbuda sprinter. She competed at the 2014 and 2016 IAAF World Indoor Championships.

She was born in the United States and initially represented that country, but after failing to qualify for the 2012 Summer Olympics she decided to switch her allegiance to the Antigua and Barbuda, her grandfather's country of origin.

Her personal bests in the event are 52.15 seconds outdoors (Petersburg 2012) and 53.01 seconds indoors (Boston 2016).

== Competition record ==
Year	Competition	Venue	Position	Event	Notes
Representing Antigua and Barbuda
2013	Central American and Caribbean Championships	Morelia, Mexico	13th (h)	400 m	54.44
2014	World Indoor Championships	Sopot, Poland	18th (h)	400 m	54.74
2014	Commonwealth Games	Glasgow, United Kingdom	32nd (h)	400 m	55.57
2015	NACAC Championships	San José, Costa Rica	17th (h)	200 m	24.20
2015	NACAC Championships	San José, Costa Rica	12th (h)	400 m	53.55
2016	World Indoor Championships	Portland, United States	12th (sf)	400 m	54.67
