= Andrew Evans (discus thrower) =

American discus thrower

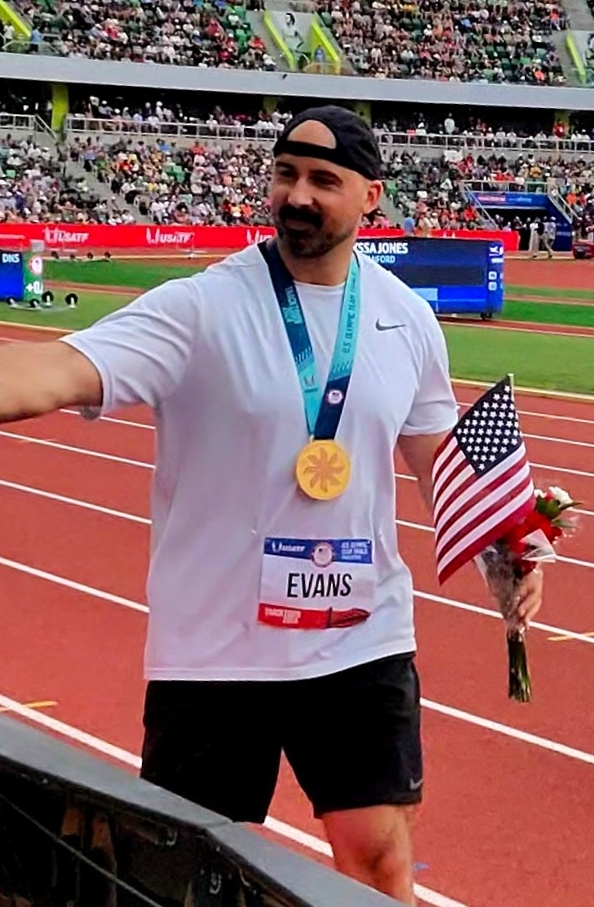
- Evans in 2024

Personal information
- Born: January 25, 1991 (age 35) Kalamazoo, Michigan, U.S.
- Home town: Portage, Michigan, U.S.
- Height: 6 ft 6 in (198 cm)
- Weight: 275 lb (125 kg)

Sport
- Sport: Track and field
- Event: Discus throw
- College team: Kentucky Wildcats

Achievements and titles
- Personal best: Discus throw: 68.09 m (223 ft 4 1/2 in)
Medal record
Men's athletics
Representing the United States
NACAC Championships
Silver medal – second place	2015 San José	Discus throw

Andrew Evans (born January 25, 1991) is an American track and field athlete who competes in the discus throw.

Born to Lawrence and Laura Evans he grew up in Portage, Michigan. He competed in ice hockey, American football and discus at high school.

As a sophomore, 2007, Andrew finished as MI MHSAA D1 State Discus Runner-Up with a throw of 162'5". He also finished as All-State in Shot Put his sophomore year with a throw of 52'10.75".

He is two time MHSAA Division 1 State Discus Champion (2008 - 180'8" & 2009 - 182'10") from Portage Northern High School, MI. He finished as State Runner-Up in Shot Put in 2008 - 60'4" - & 2009 - 57'9.75", The PN T&F team finished 2nd in the State of Michigan D1 championship in 2009.

He made his international debut at the 2010 World Junior Championships in Athletics, taking tenth place. After a period at Kalamazoo Valley Community College he went on to attend the University of Kentucky from 2011 and took part in competitions with the Kentucky Wildcats team.

He was the winner of the discus at the Southeastern Conference outdoor championships in 2012 and 2014, finishing runner-up in the interim. At the NCAA Men's Division I Outdoor Track and Field Championships he was seventh in 2012 and improved to third in 2013. In his final year, however, he fell back to 14th place.

Leaving college and turning professional, he entered the 2015 USA Outdoor Track and Field Championships and took third place. He failed to obtain the qualifying standard for the 2015 World Championships in Athletics, however. Both he and Russ Winger contested the final place at the 2015 NACAC Championships in Athletics and it ultimately went to Winger, with Evans being the silver medalist at the NACAC meet.

He achieved the Olympic standard in April 2016 with a new personal record of 65.41 m (214 ft 7 in). At age 25 he made his first American Olympic team with a third-place finish at the 2016 United States Olympic Trials, finishing behind Mason Finley and Tavis Bailey.

== International competitions ==
Year	Competition	Venue	Position	Event	Notes
2010	World Junior Championships	Moncton, Canada	10th	Discus throw	56.91 m
2015	NACAC Championships	San José, Costa Rica	2nd	Discus throw	59.32 m
2016	Olympic Games	Rio de Janeiro, Brazil	16th (q)	Discus throw	61.87 m
2017	World Championships	London, United Kingdom	20th (q)	Discus throw	61.32 m
2022	World Championships	Eugene, United States	18th (q)	Discus throw	62.20 m
2022	NACAC Championships	Freeport, Bahamas	4th	Discus throw	61.09 m
2024	Olympic Games	Paris, France	17th (q)	Discus throw	62.25 m
