= 2015 World Championships in Athletics qualification standards =

The following marks are the qualification standards for the 2015 World Championships in Athletics. The standards have been changed again from the 2013 standards. Each country may send a maximum of four athletes who have attained the A qualification mark in each specific event. A maximum of three athletes can compete in that event, with the sole exception of the relays, in which four of a possible six athletes may compete.

The qualification period ends on August 10, 2015, the date final entries are due. The start date for the qualification period was October 1, 2014 for all events except for 10,000 metres, Marathon, Race Walks, Relays and Combined Events which began on January 1, 2014. The Janusz Kusociński Memorial meeting is scheduled for August 9.

== Wild Card ==
Area Champions (i.e. athletes who have won an event at their continental level championships) are granted automatic entrance, irrespective of whether they have achieved the qualification marks. The reigning World Champion in each event is also granted a bye into the competition, and does not count as part of their country's quota of athletes in that event. Furthermore, host countries may enter one unqualified athlete if no one of the respective nationality has achieved the required mark.

== Target ==
The IAAF has a target for the number of athletes participating in each event. If there are not sufficient qualified entries in each event, the IAAF will invite the next highest ranked athletes to fill out the field, except in races 5,000 metres and longer. If a country does not have a qualified athlete in any events, one representative will be allowed to compete in a preliminary round of the 100 metres. The 100 metres targeted field size is not including the preliminary round.

== Qualification standards ==
| Event | Men's | Women's | Field size |
| 100 m | 10.16 | 11.33 | 56 |
| 200 m | 20.50 | 23.20 | 56 |
| 400 m | 45.50 | 52.00 | 48 |
| 800 m | 1:46.00 | 2:01.00 | 48 |
| 1500 m (or mile) | 3:36.20; 3:53.00 | 4:06.50; 4:25.20 | 45 |
| 5000 m | 13:23.00 | 15:20.00 | no size qual. only |
| 10,000 m | 27:45.00 | 32:00.00 | no size qual. only |
| Marathon | 2:17:00 | 2:43:00 | no size qual. only |
| 3000 m steeplechase | 8:28.00 | 9:44.00 | 45 |
| 100 m hurdles | — | 13.00 | 40 |
| 110 m hurdles | 13.47 | — | 40 |
| 400 m hurdles | 49.50 | 55.20 | 40 |
| High jump | 2.28 m | 1.94 m | 32 |
| Pole vault | 5.65 m | 4.50 m | 32 |
| Long jump | 8.10 m | 6.70 m | 32 |
| Triple jump | 16.90 m | 14.20 m | 32 |
| Shot put | 20.45 m | 17.75 m | 32 |
| Discus throw | 65.00 m | 61.00 m | 32 |
| Hammer throw | 76.00 m | 70.00 m | 32 |
| Javelin throw | 82.00 m | 61.00 m | 32 |
| Heptathlon | — | 6100 pts | 32 |
| Decathlon | 8075 pts | — | 32 |
| 20 km race walk | 1:25:00 | 1:36:00 | no size qual. only |
| 50 km race walk | 4:06:00 | — | no size qual. only |
| 4 × 100 m relay | Top 8 at IAAF World Relays plus top 8 ranked teams | | |
| 4 × 400 m relay | Top 8 at IAAF World Relays plus top 8 ranked teams | | |
