= Adanaca Brown =

Bahamian hurdler

Personal information
- Full name: Adanaca Brown-Ponder
- Born: 23 October 1993 (age 32)

Sport
- Country: Bahamas
- Sport: Track and field
- Event: 100 metres hurdles
- Updated on 29 August 2015

Adanaca Brown-Ponder (née Brown, born 23 October 1993) is a hurdler from the Bahamas. She competed in the 100 metres hurdles event at the 2015 World Championships in Beijing without qualifying for the semifinals.

Her personal best in the 100 metres hurdles is 13.00 seconds (-0.1 m/s) set in Nassau in 2015. With that result she is the co-holder of the national record.

== Competition record ==
Year	Competition	Venue	Position	Event	Notes
Representing the Bahamas
2015	Pan American Games	Toronto, Ontario, Canada	12th (h)	100 m hurdles	13.18 (w)
2015	Pan American Games	Toronto, Ontario, Canada	7th	4 × 100 m relay	44.38
2015	NACAC Championships	San José, Costa Rica	14th (h)	100 m hurdles	14.04 (w)
2015	NACAC Championships	San José, Costa Rica	4th	4 × 100 m relay	44.28
2015	World Championships	Beijing, China	34th (h)	100 m hurdles	13.74

== See also ==
- Bahamas at the 2015 World Championships in Athletics
