= JaCorian Duffield =

American high jumper

Personal information
- Full name: JaCorian Kevon Duffield
- Born: September 2, 1992 (age 34) Wichita, Kansas

Sport
- Sport: Track and field
- Event: High jump
- College team: Texas Tech Red Raiders

Achievements and titles
- Personal best: 2.34 m (7 ft 8 in)

JaCorian Kevon Duffield (born September 2, 1992) is an American track and field athlete who competes in the high jump. His personal record for the event is 2.34 m (7 ft 8 in), set as he was the 2015 runner-up at the USA Outdoor Track and Field Championships.

Duffield competed for Texas Tech University collegiately and won both the indoor and outdoor NCAA titles in 2015.

== Career ==
=== Early life and college ===
Born in Wichita, Kansas, his family moved to Texas and he grew up in the state in Schertz, Texas, attending Randolph High School. While at high school he competed in basketball and the high jump, becoming state champion in the latter. After graduation he went on to study business management at Texas Tech University. He began to compete for the school's Texas Tech Red Raiders college athletics team.

In his freshman year he took fifth place at the Big 12 Conference Championships and ranked seventeenth at the NCAA Men's Outdoor Track and Field Championships, being one of five freshmen athletes to have qualified for the top level meet. Though he was only eighth at the 2013 Big 12 indoor meet, he managed runner-up at the conference outdoor event. He again qualified for the NCAA Outdoor Championships and improved to seventh place with a personal record equalling mark of 2.20 m (7 ft 2 1/2 in). A new best of 2.23 m (7 ft 3 3/4 in) followed at the Big 12 indoors (ranking second) and on his debut at the NCAA Men's Indoor Track and Field Championships he placed fifth. Outdoors, he cleared 2.23 m (7 ft 3 3/4 in) to place third at the Texas Relays before setting an outright best of 2.27 m (7 ft 5 1/4 in) in Lubbock, Texas in May. He was somewhat short of that height at the Big 12 Outdoor Championships, repeating his runner-up finish, and was down to tenth place at that year's NCAA Outdoor Championships. Better results came at the 2014 USA Outdoor Track and Field Championships, where he achieved a height of 2.25 m (7 ft 4 1/2 in) and ranked sixth in the top level national competition. He gained his first international selection for the 2014 NACAC Under-23 Championships in Athletics, but failed to record a height.

Duffield showed marked improvement in the 2015 season, setting a new best of 2.28 m (7 ft 5 3/4 in) indoors in February. He added a further centimeter to that at the NCAA Indoor Championships to win his first collegiate title. He and fellow Texas Tech alumnus Bradley Adkins made it the first time in over forty years since a school had provided the top two athletes in the NCAA high jump. Two weeks later he jumped higher again, clearing 2.31 m (7 ft 6 3/4 in) to win at the Texas Relays. This performance raised him to the top of the global rankings at that point of the season. He extended his winning streak to include the Drake Relays and then the Big 12 Conference outdoor championship. At the 2015 NCAA Outdoor Championships Duffield and Adkins repeated their 1–2 placings, with the former achieving an NCAA indoor/outdoor double to match the feat of Derek Drouin in 2013. This was the peak performance of his career as a Texas Tech athlete, and also his last for the school.

=== Professional career ===
At the 2015 USA Outdoor Track and Field Championships he improved his personal best to 2.34 m (7 ft 8 in) and was beaten only by Erik Kynard (the 2012 Olympic runner-up). This earned Duffield the right to represent the United States at the 2015 World Championships in Athletics. He was knocked out in the qualification and failed to reach the final.

== Personal bests ==
- High jump outdoor: 2.34 m (7 ft 8 in) (2015)
- High jump indoor: 2.29 m (7 ft 6 in) (2015)

== National titles ==
- NCAA Men's Outdoor Track and Field Championships
  - High jump: 2015
- NCAA Men's Indoor Track and Field Championships
  - High jump: 2015

== International competitions ==
Year	Competition	Venue	Position	Notes
2014	NACAC Under-23 Championships	Kamloops, Canada	—	NH
2015	NACAC Championships	San José, Costa Rica	1st	2.25
2015	World Championships	Beijing, China	16th (q)	2.29 m
