= Shalaya Kipp =

American middle-distance runner

Personal information
- Born: August 19, 1990 (age 35) Salt Lake City, Utah
- Height: 5 ft 7 in (170 cm)
- Weight: 130 lb (59 kg)

Sport
- Country: United States
- Event: 3000m Steeplechase
- College team: Colorado Buffaloes
- Coached by: Mark Wetmore

Achievements and titles
- Personal best: 3000 m Steeplechase: 9:28.72
Medal record
Women's athletics
Representing the United States
Pan American Games
Silver medal – second place	2015 Toronto	3000 m steeplechase
NACAC Championships
Silver medal – second place	2015 Costa Rica	3000 m steeplechase

Shalaya Kipp (born August 19, 1990) is an American middle-distance runner who competed at the 2012 Summer Olympics in the 3000 meter steeplechase.

== Career ==
=== 2011 ===
Kipp finished 9th in the final at 2011 USA Outdoor Track and Field Championships in 10:01.85.

=== 2012 ===
Kipp was the NCAA outdoor steeplechase champion in 2012 with a time of 9:49.91.

Kipp qualified for the 2012 Summer Olympics by placing third at the U.S. Olympic trials in the 3000 meter steeplechase with a time of 9:35.73. She beat her personal best by more than 7 seconds and achieved the Olympic A standard for the first time.

At the 2012 Olympics, Kipp finished twelfth in her heat with a time of 9:48.33 and did not qualify for the final.

=== 2013 ===
Kipp was 3rd at 2013 USA Outdoor Track and Field Championships steeplechase with a time of 9:46.83. Kipp qualified for the 2013 World Championships in Athletics by placing third at the U.S. Championship in the 3000 meter steeplechase with a time of 9:46.83 and achieving a qualifying time of 9:37.23 to place 4th at Monaco. At the 2013 World Championship, Kipp finished 9th in her prelim with a time of 9:45.97. Kipp was ranked 13th in the world in the steeplechase in 2013.

=== 2014 ===
Kipp earned Pac-12 student athlete honors on April 22. Kipp won the steeplechase in Pullman, Washington (10:04.19) on 17 May. Kipp earned All-American with a 5th-place finish (9:48.90) in Eugene, Oregon on 13 June. Kipp placed 7th at 2014 USA Outdoor Track and Field Championships steeplechase with a time of 9:46.57 in Sacramento, California where the temperature approached 95 degrees.

=== 2015 ===
Shalaya ran a 1500 m personal best at the Payton Jordan Invitational with a time of 4:14. Shalaya won the Portland track festival steeplechase. Kipp earned a CU graduate scholastic honors by making the 4.0 club. Kipp finished 6th in a time of 9:37.09 at 2015 USA Outdoor Track and Field Championships steeplechase. At the 2015 USA Outdoor Track and Field Championships Kipp placed 6th in a time of 9:37.09 to qualify for the NACAC Championships in Costa Rica where she earned a silver medal. Shalaya finished 2nd in 9:49.96 at 2015 Pan American Games in Toronto.

=== 2016 ===
Kipp scored points for team Philadelphia placing 3rd in a time of 9:45.05 in the steeplechase at the July 29 Track Town Summer Series in Eugene, Oregon and finished 4th in a time of 9:34.12 after hitting a barrier at July 23 London Diamond League steeplechase.

Kipp ran a personal best time of 9:28.72 to place fourth in the steeplechase behind Team USA teammates Emma Coburn, Courtney Frerichs and Colleen Quigley at the 2016 United States Olympic Trials (track and field) and was an alternate to represent United States at Athletics at the 2016 Summer Olympics.

Kipp opened her outdoor season on May 1 running in the steeplechase at the Payton Jordan Invitational, finishing third in a time of 9:43.72 and on May 20 she placed second at the steeplechase at USATF Hoka One One Middle Distance Classic hosted at Occidental College, in a time of 9:42.31. On March 12, 2016, Shalaya Kipp placed third in women 3000 meters in 8:59.85 at 2016 USA Indoor Track and Field Championships.

=== 2017 ===
On November 4, Kipp placed 9th in 16:08 at USATF 5 km road championships at Abbott Dash to the Finish Line 5K in New York, New York.

On October 1, Kipp placed 7th in 55:56 at USATF 10 mile road championships at Medtronic TC 10 Mile in St Paul/Minneapolis, Minnesota.

On September 4, Kipp placed 9th in 1:09:25 at USATF 20 km road championships at Faxon Law New Haven Road Race in New Haven, Connecticut.

== Personal life ==
She is the only child of Ron Kipp and Shannon Clay-Gillette born on August 19, 1990. Kipp attended Skyline High School in Millcreek, Utah.

Collegiate Honors:

- 2010, 11, 12, 14 Steeplechase All-American
- 2014 (i) 5000 All-American
- 2010 (40th), 11 (19th), 12 (18th), 13 (9th) Cross Country All-American
- Three-time All-Big 12 honoree
- Pac-12 Steeplechase Champion (2012)
- Placed ninth at the 2011 USATF Championships in the steeplechase
- Placed third at the 2012 U.S. Olympic Team Trials (9:35.73)
- 2012 Olympian (steeplechase)

She currently lives in Rochester, Minnesota with her family.

She was also a competitive alpine ski racer for 10 years before focusing on track and field.
