= 2015 USA Outdoor Track and Field Championships =

- Dates: June 25–28
- Host city: Eugene, Oregon, United States
- Venue: Hayward Field, University of Oregon
- Level: Senior
- Type: Outdoor
- Events: 40 (men: 20; women: 20)

The 2015 USA Outdoor Track and Field Championships were held at Hayward Field, University of Oregon in Eugene, Oregon. Organized by USA Track and Field, the four-day competition took place June 25–28 and served as the national championships in track and field for the United States. The event was held in conjunction with the USA Junior Outdoor Track & Field Championships.

== Schedule ==
Event schedule
| Day | Events |
|---|---|
| June 25 | Decathlon (day 1), 800 m heats (men and women), triple jump final (women), 400 m heats (men and women), 1500 m heats (men), javelin final (men), hammer throw (men), discus throw final (men), shot put (women), 400 m hurdles heats (men), 100 m heats (men and women), steeplechase heats (women), 10,000 meters final (men and women) |
| June 26 | Decathlon (day 2), 100 m hurdles heats (women), 100 m semi-finals and finals (men and women), triple jump final (women), javelin final (women), high jump final (men), steeplechase heats (men), 1500 m heats (women), 400 m semi-finals (men and women), 800 m semi-finals (men and women) |
| June 27 | Heptathlon (day 1), hammer throw final (women), pole vault final (men), long jump final (women), discus throw final (women), 100 m hurdles semi-finals and finals (women), 200 m heats (men and women), 110 m hurdles heats (men), 400 m hurdles semi-finals (women), 400 m hurdles final (men), steeplechase final (women), 1500 m final (men), 400 m final (men and women) |
| June 28 | 20 km walk final (men and women), 5000 m final (men and women), heptathlon (day 2), 200 m semi-finals and finals (men and women), pole vault final (women), high jump final (women), triple jump final (men), shot put (men), 110 m hurdles semi-finals and final (men), 400 m hurdles final (women), 800 m final (men and women), steeplechase final (men), 1500 m final (women) |

== Men's results ==
Key: ≠ Not yet selected in respective event because the athlete has not achieved the required qualifying standard. However, athletes can still pursue standards following this meet and still make the team provided they attain it before the August 10 cutoff date.

=== Men track events ===
| Event | Gold | | Silver | | Bronze | |
|---|---|---|---|---|---|---|
| 100 meters^{[a]} +0.0 | Tyson Gay | 9.87 | Trayvon Bromell | 9.96 | Michael Rodgers | 9.97 |
| 200 meters +0.4 | Justin Gatlin | 19.57 | Isiah Young | 19.93 | Wallace Spearmon | 20.10 |
| 400 meters^{[g]} | David Verburg | 44.63 | LaShawn Merritt | 44.66 | Vernon Norwood | 44.80 |
| 800 meters | Nicholas Symmonds | 1:44.53 | Erik Sowinski | 1:44.84 | Casimir Loxsom | 1:45.35 |
| 1500 meters^{[h]} | Matthew Centrowitz | 3:37.25 | Robby Andrews | 3:38.75 | Leonel Manzano | 3:38.76 |
| 5000 meters^{[n]} | Ryan Hill | 13:50.69 | Benjamin True | 13:51.09 | Galen Rupp | 13:51.54 |
| 10,000 meters | Galen Rupp | 28:11.61 | Benjamin True | 28:14.26 | Hassan Mead | 28:16.54 |
| 110 m hurdles^{[o]} +0.4 | David Oliver | 13.04 | Ronnie Ash | 13.13 | Aries Merritt | 13.19 |
| 400 m hurdles | Bershawn Jackson | 48.29 | Johnny Dutch | 48.43 | Kerron Clement | 48.44 |
| 3000 m steeplechase | Evan Jager | 8:12.29 | Donald Cabral | 8:13.37 | Daniel Huling | 8:14.11 |
| 20 kilometers walk | John Nunn≠ | 1:28:39.48 | Nick Christie≠ | 1:30:51.69 | Patrick Stroupe≠ | 1:31:28.34 |

=== Men field events ===
| Event | Gold | | Silver | | Bronze | |
|---|---|---|---|---|---|---|
| High jump | Erik Kynard | 2.37 m (7 ft 9 1/4 in) | JaCorian Duffield | 2.34 m (7 ft 8 in) | Jesse Williams | 2.31 m (7 ft 6 3/4 in) |
| Pole vault | Sam Kendricks | 5.75m (18-10¼ ) | Brad Walker | 5.60m (18-4½ ) | Jacob Blankenship | 5.60m (18-4½ ) |
| Long jump | Marquis Dendy | 8.68 m (28 ft 5 1/2 in)w (wind: +3.7 m/s) | Jeffery Henderson | 8.44 m (27 ft 8 1/4 in) -0.3 | Michael Hartfield | 8.42 m (27 ft 7 1/4 in)w (wind: +2.5 m/s) |
| Triple jump | Omar Craddock | 17.53m (57-6¼ ) +1.0 | Will Claye | 17.48m (57-4¼ ) +0.5 | Marquis Dendy | 17.23m (56-6½ ) +1.0 |
| Shot put | Joe Kovacs | 21.84m (71-8 ) | Christian Cantwell | 21.64m (71-0 ) | Jordan Clarke | 21.49m (70-6¼ ) |
| Discus throw ^{[b]} | Jared Schuurmans | 64.64 m (212 ft 3/4 in) | Russell Winger | 64.34 m (211 ft 1 in) | Andrew Evans≠ | 63.67 m (208 ft 10 1/2 in) |
| Hammer throw | Kibwe Johnson | 76.95 m (252 ft 5 1/2 in) | Conor McCullough | 76.09 m (249 ft 7 1/2 in) | A.G. Kruger | 76.01 m (249 ft 4 1/2 in) |
| Javelin throw ^{[c]} | Sean Furey | 83.08 m (272 ft 6 3/4 in) | Riley Dolezal | 80.75 m (264 ft 11 in) | Samuel Crouser | 75.93 m (249 ft 1 1/4 in) |
| Decathlon | Trey Hardee | 8725 pts | Jeremy Taiwo | 8264 pts | Zach Ziemek | 8107 pts |

==== Notes ====
^{a} Remontay McClain 9.82 (+4.9) in the heats; Bromell 9.76 (+3.7), Gay 9.79 (+3.0) in semis

^{b} Winger and Evans had not yet achieved the qualifying standard of 65.00 m. Fourth place Rodney Brown threw 65.04 at the Penn Relays on April 18 and seventh place Chase Madison threw 65.42 on the same day in Rock Island, Illinois. Though neither Winger or Evans reached the standard, Winger qualified for the World Championships by winning the NACAC Championship; Brown will take the third entry into the world championships.

^{c} Dolezal and Crouser had not yet achieved the qualifying standard of 82.00 m. Crouser threw 83.33 m in Portland, Oregon on August 1. Dolezal did not meet the standard, but qualified by winning the NACAC championship. Fourth place Tim Glover, who threw 84.09 m on April 11, would have been the next in line to qualify.

^{g} Because Merritt already has a bye (doubly so), 4th place finisher Bryshon Nellum 45.18 is likely to get the third US entry into the World Championships

^{h} Of the top 3, only Centrowitz had reached the qualifying standard (3:36.20, or 3:53.30 in the mile) before the National Championships. Andrews ran 3:35.82 in Portland, Oregon on July 2; Manzano ran 3:36.16 in Monaco on July 17.

^{n} True, who also qualified in the 10,000 m, had not achieved the qualification standard of 13:23 before the USATF Championships. He ran 13:06.15 in Heusden-Zolder on July 18.

^{o} Since Oliver already holds a bye into the world championships, 4th place finisher Aleec Harris (13.241, .005 ahead of Jeffrey Porter) is likely to get the third US entry into the World Championships.

== Women's results ==
Key: ≠ Not yet selected in respective event because the athlete has not achieved the required qualifying standard. However, athletes can still pursue standards following this meet and still make the team provided they attain it before the August 10 cutoff date.

=== Women track events ===
| Event | Gold | | Silver | | Bronze | |
|---|---|---|---|---|---|---|
| 100 meters^{[d]} +1.2 | Tori Bowie | 10.81 | English Gardner | 10.86 | Jasmine Todd | 10.92 |
| 200 meters +0.4 | Jenna Prandini | 22.20 | Candyce McGrone | 22.38 | Jeneba Tarmoh | 22.44 |
| 400 meters | Allyson Felix | 50.19 | Natasha Hastings | 50.25 | Phyllis Francis | 50.67 |
| 800 meters | Alysia Montano | 1:59.15 | Brenda Martinez | 1:59.71 | Ajee' Wilson | 2:00.05 |
| 1500 meters^{[l]} | Jennifer Simpson | 4:14.86 | Shannon Rowbury | 4:14.99 | Kerri Gallagher | 4:15.81 |
| 5000 meters | Nicole Tully | 15:06.44 | Marielle Hall | 15:06.45 | Abbey D'Agostino | 15:06.59 |
| 10,000 meters | Molly Huddle | 31:39.20 | Shalane Flanagan | 31:42.29 | Emily Infeld | 31:42.60 |
| 100 m hurdles^{[p]} -0.1 | Dawn Harper-Nelson | 12.55 | Keni Harrison | 12.56 | Sharika Nelvis | 12.59 |
| 400 m hurdles | Shamier Little | 53.83 | Cassandra Tate | 54.01 | Kori Carter | 54.41 |
| 3000 m s'chase | Emma Coburn | 9:15.59 | Stephanie Garcia | 9:23.48 | Colleen Quigley | 9:24.92 |
| 20 kilometers walk^{[m]} | Miranda Melville | 1:36:33.99 | Maria Michta-Coffey | 1:38:45.92 | Katie Burnett≠ | 1:40:00.57 |

=== Women field events ===
| Event | Gold | | Silver | | Bronze | |
|---|---|---|---|---|---|---|
| High jump^{[k]} | Chaunte Lowe≠ | 1.91m (6-3¼ ) | Elizabeth Patterson≠ | 1.88m (6-2 ) | Amy Acuff≠ | 1.88m (6-2 ) |
| Pole vault | Jennifer Suhr | 4.82m (15-9¾ ) | Sandi Morris | 4.65m (15-3 ) | Demi Payne | 4.60m (15-1 ) |
| Long jump^{[j]} | Tianna Bartoletta | 7.12m (23-4½ ) -0.4 | Brittney Reese | 6.97m (22-10½ ) -0.1 | Janay DeLoach | 6.95m (22-9¾ ) +1.1 |
| Triple jump^{[e]} | Christina Epps≠ | 14.09 m (46 ft 2 1/2 in) | April Sinkler≠ | 13.83 m (45 ft 4 1/4 in) | Keturah Orji≠ | 13.81 m (45 ft 3 1/2 in) |
| Shot put | Michelle Carter | 20.02 m (65 ft 8 in) | Tia Brooks | 18.93 m (62 ft 1 1/4 in) | Jeneva Stevens | 18.84 m (61 ft 9 1/2 in) |
| Discus throw | Gia Lewis-Smallwood | 63.09m (207-0 ) | Whitney Ashley | 62.21m (204-1 ) | Shelbi Vaughan | 60.76m (199-4 ) |
| Hammer throw | Amber Campbell | 72.36m (237-5 ) | DeAnna Price | 72.30m (237-2 ) | Amanda Bingson | 70.60m (231-7 ) |
| Javelin throw^{[f]} | Kara Winger | 64.94 m (213 ft 1/2 in) | Brittany Borman | 61.80 m (202 ft 9 in) | Hannah Carson≠ | 59.57 m (195 ft 5 1/4 in) |
| Heptathlon | Barbara Nwaba | 6500 | Sharon Day-Monroe | 6458 | Erica Bougard | 6288 |

==== Notes ====
- ^{d} Bowie 10.72 and Carmelita Jeter 10.76 (both +3.2); Gardner 10.79 (+1.5) in semis. Gardner moves to a tie for #14 on the all-time list
- ^{e} As of the National Championships, no American has achieved the 14.20 m qualification standard. Orji, with a 14.15 set two weeks earlier at the 2015 NCAA Division I Outdoor Track and Field Championships was ranked the highest worldwide (18th) and might be invited to fill out the world championship field if none of these athletes are able to achieve the standard by August 10. Epps, ranked 21st globally, also has an outside chance.

^{f} Carson did not meet the qualifying standard of 61.00 m, nor did any other Americans. Consequently, only two Americans were named to the team in this event.

^{j} Since Reese already held a bye into the world championships, Jasmine Todd, who placed 4th with 6.84m (22-5¼ ) +1.2, got the third US entry into the World Championships. Todd also qualified in the 100 meters.

^{k} None of the finalists had achieved the qualifying standard of 1.94m by the time of the National Championships. The only American to achieve the standard is high schooler Vashti Cunningham who entered and won the Junior National Championship.

^{l} Since Simpson held a bye into the world championships, 4th place finisher Lauren Johnson (4:16.08) also qualified for the World Championships. At the end of the championships, neither Kerri Gallagher or Johnson had run a qualifying time, but both of them met the standard later; Gallagher ran 4:03.56 in Lignano on July 7 to qualify for world championships, while Johnson ran 4:04.17 in Heusden-Zolder on July 18.

^{m} Melville and Michta are the only Americans to achieve the qualifying standard before the National Championships

^{p} Nelvis 12.34 (+1.9) in the prelims puts her as #7 on the all time list

== Qualification ==
The 2015 USA Outdoor Track and Field Championships serve as the qualification meet for United States representatives in international competitions, including the 2015 World Championships in Athletics. In order to be entered, athletes need to achieve a qualifying standard mark and place in the top 3 in their event. The United States team, as managed by USATF can also bring a qualified back up athlete in case one of the team members is unable to perform. Area champions (meaning, for North American athletes, gold medalists at the 2015 NACAC Championships) did not need to meet the qualifying standard; NACAC conducted its championships three weeks before the World Championships, thus providing one additional opportunity for qualification.

Additionally, defending World Champions and 2014 Diamond League Champion received byes into the World Championships.

The athletes eligible for a bye are:

=== Defending World Champions ===
- LaShawn Merritt - 400 meters
- David Oliver - 110 m hurdles
- Ashton Eaton - Decathlon
- Brianna Rollins - 100 m hurdles
- Brittney Reese - Long jump

=== Diamond League Champions ===
- Justin Gatlin - 100 meters
- LaShawn Merritt - 400 meters (already qualified as World Champion)
- Michael Tinsley - 400 m hurdles
- Christian Taylor - Triple jump
- Reese Hoffa - Shot put
- Allyson Felix - 200 meters
- Jennifer Simpson - 1500 meters

Not eligible for a bye because the Diamond League Champion cannot displace a World Champion

- Dawn Harper-Nelson - 100 m hurdles
- Tianna Bartoletta - Long jump

Both qualified by winning their respective events in the championships.
