= Qualifying standards in athletics =

Eligibility requirements for competition

In sports under the athletics banner, certain competitions require an athlete to meet a qualifying standard, meaning a mark as good or better than this set mark, in order to be eligible to compete. Naturally, an elite level competition does not want to embarrass its reputation nor the competitor in an event beyond their competition level. With a limited number of lanes on the track (or field event facilities) they must limit the number of competitors participating in a given amount of time at a meet.

== High level competition ==
For the highest elite level competitions like the Olympics and World Athletics Championships, World Athletics, the world governing body for athletics, publishes standards in advance of the competitions. The currently expressed standards are intended to qualify about 2,000 athletes across all disciplines (24 men's events and 23 women's events) to be eligible to compete in these meets.

Normally an athlete has a window of time to achieve their mark at any competition "organised or authorised by the IAAF, its Area Associations or its National Member Federations in conformity with IAAF Rules. Results achieved at university or school competitions must be certified by the National Federation of the country in which the competition was organised." These qualitative conduct standards would be equivalent to those requirements to certify a world record.

Entries for these high level competitions must be selected by the national governing body (NGB) or in the case of the Olympics, must be submitted by the National Olympic Committee (NOC). Each country is allowed to choose their own method of selecting the names submitted. The United States Olympic Committee, for example, conducts the Olympic Trials, through its national governing body USATF, and for events other than relays, selection is based purely on placement in that meet. However UK Athletics has a selection committee that uses a variety of athletic results in an evaluation process.

== A and B standards ==
Prior to 2014 the Olympics and World Championships used a system with A standards and B standards, for example in qualification for the 2012 Summer Olympics and qualification the 2013 World Championships.

The A standard was the most difficult to achieve. A rule said an NOC "may enter up to three athletes for each event on the athletics program, provided they have achieved the A standard. In addition they can enter one reserve athlete for the same event provided he/she has also achieved the A standard."

Alternatively NOCs could enter one athlete for each event on the athletics program if he/she had achieved at least the B standard. In addition they could enter one reserve athlete for the same event provided he/she had also achieved at least the B standard.

The qualification for the 2015 World Championships and the qualification for the 2016 Summer Olympics uses single entry standards. The rules are similar to the previous A standards with up to three athletes per NOC. The requirements are generally a little lower than the old A standard but higher than the B standard. If a country has no athletes who satisfy the standard in an event then it can no longer get one place for an athlete satisfying a lower standard.

In 2017, the World Athletics Rankings were announced, and this new system was used in combination with 'A' standards to fill the fields of global championships starting in athletics at the 2021 Summer Olympics. This new system has led to more difficult 'A' standards being set, with the idea that most of the fields should be filled by descending order of world rankings position rather than achievement of any single standard.

== Unqualified competitors ==
In order to make the meet globally encompassing, every NOC or NGB, is allowed to submit one athlete to compete, even if they have not achieved the standards. The hosting country for the meet is allowed to enter one athlete per event.

== Other meets ==
Other championship meets that have qualifying standards include the NCAA meets. While currently the Div. 1 outdoor championships is based on regional qualifying other outdoor divisions and all indoor divisions have standards.
