= Athletics at the 2015 Pan American Games – Men's 800 metres =

Men's 800 metres at the 2015 Pan American Games
- Venue: CIBC Pan Am and Parapan Am Athletics Stadium
- Dates: July 22 – July 23
- Competitors: 15 from 10 nations
- Winning time: 1:47.19

Medalists
Gold medal	Clayton Murphy	United States
Silver medal	Rafith Rodríguez	Colombia
Bronze medal	Ryan Martin	United States

The men's 800 metres sprint competition of the athletics events at the 2015 Pan American Games will take place between the 22 and 23 of July at the CIBC Pan Am and Parapan Am Athletics Stadium in Toronto, Canada. The defending Pan American Games champion is Andy González of Cuba.

== Records ==
Prior to this competition, the existing world and Pan American Games records were as follows:

World record	David Rudisha (KEN)	1:41.01	Rieti, Italy	August 29, 2010
Pan American Games record	Yeimer López (CUB)	1:44.58	Rio de Janeiro, Brazil	July 28, 2007

== Qualification ==
Each National Olympic Committee (NOC) was able to enter up to two entrants providing they had met the minimum standard (1.50.00) in the qualifying period (January 1, 2014 to June 28, 2015).

== Schedule ==
Date	Time	Round
July 22, 2015	11:35	Semifinals
July 23, 2015	18:40	Final

== Results ==
All times shown are in seconds.

KEY:	q	Fastest non-qualifiers	Q	Qualified	NR	National record	PB	Personal best	SB	Seasonal best	DQ	Disqualified

=== Semifinals ===
Rank	Heat	Name	Nationality	Time	Notes
1	1	Clayton Murphy	United States	1:48.88	Q
2	2	Ryan Martin	United States	1:48.99	Q
3	1	Rafith Rodríguez	Colombia	1:49.06	Q
4	1	Ricardo Cunningham	Jamaica	1:49.22	Q
4	2	Jowayne Hibbert	Jamaica	1:49.22	Q
6	1	Aaron Evans	Bermuda	1:49.30	q
7	2	Cleiton Abrao	Brazil	1:49.32	Q
8	2	Andrés Arroyo	Puerto Rico	1:49.36	q
9	2	Brandon McBride	Canada	1:49.65	
10	2	James Eichberger	Mexico	1:49.68	
11	1	Lutimar Paes	Brazil	1:49.76	
12	2	Lucirio Antonio Garrido	Venezuela	1:49.84	
13	1	Andy Gonzalez	Cuba	1:51.14	
14	2	Shaquille Dill	Bermuda	1:52.25	
15	1	Anthony Romaniw	Canada	1:56.55	

=== Final ===
Rank	Name	Nationality	Time	Notes
1st place, gold medalist(s)	Clayton Murphy	United States	1:47.19	
2nd place, silver medalist(s)	Rafith Rodríguez	Colombia	1:47.23	
3rd place, bronze medalist(s)	Ryan Martin	United States	1:47.73	
4	Ricardo Cunningham	Jamaica	1:48.65	
5	Cleiton Abrao	Brazil	1:48.82	
6	Aaron Evans	Bermuda	1:49.07	
7	Andrés Arroyo	Puerto Rico	1:49.08	
8	Jowayne Hibbert	Jamaica	1:49.24	
