= 2015 NACAC Championships in Athletics =

Sport competition

II NACAC Championships
- Dates: August 7–9, 2015
- Host city: San José, Costa Rica
- Venue: Estadio Nacional de Costa Rica
- Level: Senior
- Events: 38
- Participation: 369 athletes from 31 nations

The 2015 North American, Central American and Caribbean Championships was a regional track and field competition held at the Estadio Nacional de Costa Rica in San José, Costa Rica from August 7–9, 2015. It was the second edition of a senior track and field championship for the NACAC region, held eight years after the first.

== Medal summary ==
Complete results were published.

=== Men ===
Event	Gold		Silver		Bronze	
100 metres -0.1	Remontay McClain (USA)	10.09 (.152)	Ramon Gittens (BAR)	10.11 (.190)	Levi Cadogan (BAR)	10.13 (.146).003 faster than Jason Livermore (JAM)
200 metres +1.8	Rasheed Dwyer (JAM)	20.12(.190) CR	Yancarlos Martínez (DOM)	20.28 (.181)	Antoine Adams (SKN)	20.47 (.162)
400 metres	Lalonde Gordon (TTO)	44.89 (.286) CR	Nery Brenes (CRC)	45.22 (.232)	Ricardo Chambers (JAM)	45.37 (.200)
800 metres	Ryan Martin (USA)	1:45.79 CR	Clayton Murphy (USA)	1:46.38	Jamaal James (TTO)	1:47.07
1500 metres	Andrew Wheating (USA)	3:45.08 CR	Daniel Winn (USA)	3:45.43	Daniel Gorman (CAN)	3:46.73
5000 metres	Lopez Lomong (USA)	13:57.53 CR	José Juan Esparza (MEX)	14:03.81	Fabian Guerrero (MEX)	14:06.64
110 m hurdles+1.5	Mikel Thomas (TTO)	13.23 (.217) CR	Jhoanis Portilla (CUB)	13.30 (.138)	Eddie Lovett (ISV)	13.31 (.186) NR
400 m hurdles	Javier Culson (PUR)	48.70 (.175)	José Luis Gaspar (CUB)	49.67 (.424)	Trevor Brown (USA)	49.88 (.476)
3000 m steeplechase	Andrew Bayer (USA)	8:44.88	Stanley Kebenei (USA)	8:52.82	Christopher Dulhanty (CAN)	9:01.44
4 × 100 m relay	Jamaica • Mario Forsythe • Jason Livermore • Oshane Bailey • Sheldon Mitchell	38.07 (.197) CR	United States • Trell Kimmons • Harry Adams • Beejay Lee • Remontay McClain	38.45 (.238)	Barbados • Levi Cadogan • Ramon Gittens • Nicholas Deshong • Burkheart Ellis	38.55 (.214) NR
4 × 400 m relay	United States • Clayton Parros • Calvin Smith • Marcus Chambers • James Harris	3:00.07 CR	Bahamas • LaToy Williams • Alonzo Russell • Wesley Neymour • Ramon Miller	3:00.53	Cuba • Williams Collazo • Adrián Chacón • Osmaidel Pellicier • Yoandys Lescay	3:01.22
High jump	JaCorian Duffield (USA)	2.25 m (7 ft 4 1/2 in) CR	Trevor Barry (BAH)	2.20 m (7 ft 2 1/2 in)	Ryan Ingraham (BAH)	2.20 m (7 ft 2 1/2 in)
Pole vault	Natan Armando Rivera (ESA)	4.70 m (15 ft 5 in)	Only competitor to clear a height Abbey Joshua Alcon (DOM), Brad Walker (USA), Lázaro Eduardo Borges (CUB). Pedro Daniel Figueroa (ESA), Nick Mossberg (USA) all NH			
Long jump	Cameron Burrell (USA)	8.06 m (26 ft 5 1/4 in) -0.4 CR	Kamal Fuller (JAM)	7.90 m (25 ft 11 in) 2.4 (7.88 m (25 ft 10 in) +2.0)	Ifeanyichukwu Otuonye (TCA)	7.71 m (25 ft 3 1/2 in) 1.1
Triple jump	Yordanis Durañona (DMA)	16.98 m (55 ft 8 1/2 in) 1.4 CR	Josh Honeycutt (USA)	16.57 m (54 ft 4 1/4 in) 2.2 16.34 m (53 ft 7 1/4 in)(0.4)	Leevan Sands (BAH)	16.53 m (54 ft 2 3/4 in) 0.2
Shot put	Jonathan Jones (USA)	20.54 m (67 ft 4 1/2 in) CR	Darrell Hill (USA)	19.67 m (64 ft 6 1/4 in)	Raymond Brown (JAM)	19.28 m (63 ft 3 in)
Discus throw	Russ Winger (USA)	60.68 m (199 ft 3/4 in) CR	Andrew Evans (USA)	59.32 m (194 ft 7 1/4 in)	Quincy Wilson (TTO)	56.82 m (186 ft 5 in)
Hammer throw	Roberto Janet (CUB)	72.72 m (238 ft 6 3/4 in) CR	Colin Dunbar (USA)	71.74 m (235 ft 4 1/4 in)	Diego Del Real (MEX)	70.83 m (232 ft 4 1/2 in)
Javelin throw	Riley Dolezal (USA)	79.30 m (260 ft 2 in) CR	Guillermo Martínez (CUB)	78.15 m (256 ft 4 3/4 in)	Albert Reynolds (LCA)	77.71 m (254 ft 11 1/4 in)

=== Women ===
Event	Gold		Silver		Bronze	
100 metres -0.1	Barbara Pierre (USA)	11.12 (.148)	Charonda Williams (USA)	11.21 (.172)	Michelle-Lee Ahye (TTO)	11.22 (.226)
200 metres +1.3	Kyra Jefferson (USA)	22.50 (.166) CR	Semoy Hackett (TTO)	22.51 (.217)	Dezerea Bryant (USA)	22.58 (.231)
400 metres	Courtney Okolo (USA)	51.57 (.312) CR	Kala Funderburk (USA)	52.22 (.392)	Bobby-Gaye Wilkins-Gooden (JAM)	52.45 (.325)
800 metres	Chanelle Price (USA)	2:00.48 CR	Gabriela Medina (MEX)	2:02.13	Kimarra McDonald (JAM)	2:02.14
1500 metres	Rachel Schneider (USA)	4:14.78 CR	Shelby Houlihan (USA)	4:16.61	Cristina Guadalupe Guevara (MEX)	4:24.75
5000 metres	Kellyn Taylor (USA)	16:24.86 CR	Rosa Elizabeth del Toro (ESA)	17:51.74	Gabriela Trana (CRC)	18:41.98
100 m hurdles +4.1	Lolo Jones (USA)	12.63	Tenaya Jones (USA)	12.68; 13.05 -0.3 CR in prelims	Kierre Beckles (BAR)	12.88
400 m hurdles	Tiffany Williams (USA)	54.35 (.190) CR	Sparkle McKnight (TTO)	55.41 (.308)	Zurian Hechavarría (CUB)	55.97 (.316)
3000 m steeplechase	Ashley Higginson (USA)	9:56.75 CR	Shalaya Kipp (USA)	10:03.91	Ana Cristina Narváez (MEX)	10:16.25
4 × 100 m relay	United States • Barbara Pierre • Lekeisha Lawson • Dezerea Bryant • Kyra Jefferson	42.24 (.268)	Puerto Rico • Beatriz Cruz • Celiangeli Morales • Genoiska Cancel • Carol Rodríguez	43.51 (.655)	Trinidad and Tobago • Kamaria Durant • Reyare Thomas • Lisa Wickham • Peli Alzola	44.24 (.495)
4 × 400 m relay	United States • Kala Funderburk • Charonda Williams • Tiffany Williams • Courtney Okolo	3:25.39 CR	Jamaica • Sonikqua Walker • Verone Chambers • Jonique Day • Bobby-Gaye Wilkins-Gooden	3:28.65	Bahamas • Lanece Clarke • Christine Amertil • Katrina Seymour • Adanaca Brown	3:31.80
High jump	Levern Spencer (LCA)	1.91 m (6 ft 3 in) CR	Priscilla Frederick (ATG)	1.88 m (6 ft 2 in)	Deandra Daniel (TTO)	1.85 m (6 ft 3/4 in)
Pole vault	Kristen Hixson (USA)	4.50 m (14 ft 9 in) CR	Kelsie Ahbe (CAN)	4.40 m (14 ft 5 in)	Katie Nageotte (USA)	4.30 m (14 ft 1 1/4 in)
Long jump	Quanesha Burks (USA)	6.93 m (22 ft 8 3/4 in) +2.0 CR	Chantel Malone (IVB)	6.69 m (21 ft 11 1/4 in) 0.0 NR	Sha'Keela Saunders (USA)	6.57 m (21 ft 6 1/2 in) +1.7
Triple jump	Shanieka Thomas (JAM)	14.23 m (46 ft 8 in) +1.3 CR	Ana José (DOM)	14.21 m (46 ft 7 1/4 in) +3.3; 14.03 m (46 ft 1/4 in)(0.9) NR	Lynnika Pitts (USA)	14.02 m (45 ft 11 3/4 in) +4.2; 13.83 m (45 ft 4 1/4 in)(1.5)
Shot put	Jill Camarena-Williams (USA)	18.62 m (61 ft 1 in) CR	Jeneva Stevens (USA)	17.61 m (57 ft 9 1/4 in)	Yaniuvis López (CUB)	16.76 m (54 ft 11 3/4 in)
Discus throw	Summer Pierson (USA)	56.64 m (185 ft 9 3/4 in)	Jaleesa Williams (TTO)	37.06 m (121 ft 7 in)	Alma Ondina Guitiérrez (HON)	36.67 m (120 ft 3 1/2 in)
Hammer throw	Amber Campbell (USA)	72.41 m (237 ft 6 3/4 in)	DeAnna Price (USA)	71.27 m (233 ft 9 3/4 in)	Yirisleydis Ford (CUB)	69.91 m (229 ft 4 1/4 in)
Javelin throw	Kara Winger (USA)	60.34 m (197 ft 11 1/2 in) CR	Yulenmi Aguilar (CUB)	56.79 m (186 ft 3 3/4 in)	Hannah Carson (USA)	50.34 m (165 ft 1 3/4 in)

== Participating nations ==
According to an unofficial count, 369 athletes from 31 countries participated.

- Anguilla (1)
- Antigua and Barbuda (4)
- Aruba (6)
- Bahamas (22)
- Barbados (14)
- Belize (7)
- Bermuda (3)
- British Virgin Islands (6)
- Canada (19)
- Cayman Islands (2)
- Costa Rica (22)
- Cuba (28)
- Curaçao (4)
- Dominica (7)
- Dominican Republic (16)
- El Salvador (11)
- Guatemala (1)
- Haiti (12)
- Honduras (5)
- Jamaica (34)
- Mexico (12)
- Montserrat (2)
- Nicaragua (1)
- Puerto Rico (7)
- Saint Kitts and Nevis (7)
- Saint Lucia (6)
- Saint Vincent and the Grenadines (2)
- Trinidad and Tobago (33)
- Turks and Caicos Islands (1)
- United States (67)
- U.S. Virgin Islands (7)
