= Riley Dolezal =

American javelin thrower (b. 1985)

Personal information
- Nationality: American
- Born: November 16, 1985 (age 40) Stanley, North Dakota
- Height: 6 ft 2 in (188 cm)
- Weight: 225 lb (102 kg; 16 st 1 lb)

Sport
- Sport: Track and field
- Event: Javelin
- College team: North Dakota State
- Club: Nike
- Turned pro: 2009

Achievements and titles
- Personal best: Javelin: 83.50 m (273 ft 11 1/4 in)
Medal record
Men's athletics
Representing the United States
Pan American
Silver medal – second place	2015 Toronto	Javelin
NACAC
Gold medal – first place	2015 San José, Costa Rica	Javelin
- Updated on July 15, 2018

Riley Dolezal (born November 16, 1985) is an American track and field athlete who competes in the javelin throw. His personal record for the event is 83.50 m (273 ft 11 1/4 in) and he is the 2013 and 2017 United States Javelin champion. He now works at Horace High School as a gym and health teacher.

== Personal and Prep ==
Born in Stanley, North Dakota, Dolezal attended Stanley High School. Outside of throwing Dolezal enjoys hunting, welding, boating, auto repair, Motorsport, video and yard games. Riley Dolezal grew up in a town of 1200 and taught himself how to throw javelin his junior year of high school. A multi-sport athlete, he had an opportunity to play football and baseball in college.

== NCAA ==
Dolezal attended North Dakota State University from 2005 to 2009 and competed in the javelin. He gradually improved from a personal record of 67.89 m (222 ft 8 3/4 in) in 2008 to 69.78 m (228 ft 11 in) in 2009.

== Professional ==
Dolezal teaches high school physical education and works as an assistant coach at North Dakota State University.

He cleared seventy metres for the first time in 2012: that year he had a best of 72.60 m (238 ft 2 1/4 in) and competed in the qualifying round of the 2012 United States Olympic Trials.

In 2013 he placed third at the Mt. SAC Relays before winning at the Drake Relays with a throw of 74.22 m (243 ft 6 in). At the 2013 USA Outdoor Track and Field Championships Dolezal had a startling breakthrough. All four of his valid throws at the competition bettered his previous record: he improved from 74.87 m to 76.10 m to 76.93 m and had his best in the fourth round with a throw of 83.50 m (273 ft 11 1/4 in). This moved him up to eighth on the all-time American lists and brought him the national title, finishing ahead of reigning NCAA champion Sam Humphreys.

Dolezal placed second in javelin at the 2014 USA Outdoor Track and Field Championships with a throw of 79.27 m (260 ft 3/4 in).

Dolezal placed second in javelin at the 2015 USA Outdoor Track and Field Championships with a throw of 80.75 m (264 ft 11 in).

Dolezal placed third in javelin at the 2016 United States Olympic Trials (track and field) with a throw of 79.67 m (261 ft 4 1/2 in).

Dolezal won the javelin title at the 2017 USA Outdoor Track and Field Championships with a throw of 81.77 m (268 ft 3 1/4 in).

Dolezal placed third in the javelin at the 2018 USA Outdoor Track and Field Championships with a throw of 75.10 m (246 ft 4 1/2 in).

Year	Competition	Venue	Position	Notes
Representing United States
2019	2019 World Championships	Doha, Qatar	26th (q)	75.62 m (248 ft 1 in)
2017	DécaNation	France	3rd	74.08 m (243 ft 1/2 in)
2015	2015 World Championships	Beijing, China	24th	77.64 m (254 ft 8 1/2 in)
2015	2015 NACAC	San José, Costa Rica	1st	79.30 m (260 ft 2 in) CR
2015	2015 Pan Am	Toronto, Canada	2nd	81.62 m (267 ft 9 1/4 in)
2013	2013 World Championships	Moscow, Russia	19th	78.76 m (258 ft 4 3/4 in)

Year	Competition	Venue	Position	Notes
USATF Championships
2012	2012 United States Olympic Trials	Eugene, Oregon	17th	70.78 m (232 ft 2 1/2 in)
2013	USA Outdoor Track and Field Championships	Des Moines, Iowa	1st	83.50 m (273 ft 11 1/4 in)
2014	USA Outdoor Track and Field Championships	Sacramento, California	2nd	79.27 m (260 ft 3/4 in)
2015	USA Outdoor Track and Field Championships	Eugene, Oregon	2nd	80.75 m (264 ft 11 in)
2016	USA Olympic Trials Track and Field Championships	Eugene, Oregon	3rd	79.67 m (261 ft 4 1/2 in)
2017	USA Outdoor Track and Field Championships	Sacramento, California	1st	81.77 m (268 ft 3 1/4 in)
2018	USA Outdoor Track and Field Championships	Des Moines, Iowa	3rd	75.10 m (246 ft 4 1/2 in)

== Seasonal bests by year ==
- 2008 – 67.89
- 2009 – 69.78
- 2010 – 69.54
- 2011 – 68.54
- 2012 – 72.60
- 2013 – 83.50
- 2014 – 79.27
- 2015 – 81.16
- 2016 – 80.42
- 2017 – 81.77
