= Kyra Jefferson =

American sprinter (born 1994)

Personal information
- Born: September 23, 1994 (age 31)

Achievements and titles
- National finals: 2011 USA U20s; • 200m, 6th; 2015 USA Champs; • 200m, 6th; 2017 USA Champs; • 200m, 5th; 2018 USA Champs; • 200m, 3rd (bronze); 2019 USA Champs; • 200m, 7th
Medal record
Women's athletics
Representing United States
Pan American Games
Silver medal – second place	2015 Toronto	200 m
Gold medal – first place	2015 Toronto	4 × 400 m relay
NACAC Championships
Gold medal – first place	2022 Freeport	4 × 400 m relay

Kyra Jefferson (born September 23, 1994) is an American professional sprinter. She competed for the University of Florida through 2017 before receiving a Nike sponsorship. She won a silver medal at the 2015 Pan American Games in the 200m and a gold in the 4 × 400 m relay.

At the 2017 NCAA Division I Women's Outdoor Track and Field Championships, she defeated pre-race favorite and Olympian Deajah Stevens of Oregon to break the American collegiate record in the 200m with a time of 22.02 seconds.

== Major international competitions ==
Year	Competition	Venue	Position	Event	Notes
2015	Herculis	Monaco	2nd	4 × 100 m	42.27
2015	Athletics at the Pan American Games	Toronto, Canada	2nd	200m	22.72
2015	Athletics at the Pan American Games	Toronto, Canada	1st	4 × 400 m	3:25.68
2017	Athletissima	Lausanne, Switzerland	3rd	200m	22.34
2017	Herculis	Monaco	2nd	200m	22.42
2017	Herculis	Monaco	2nd	4 × 100 m	43.07
2017	Weltklasse Zurich	Zürich, Switzerland	5th	200m	22.61
2017	Weltklasse Zurich	Zürich, Switzerland	5th	4 × 100 m	43.68

== Domestic competitions ==
Year	Competition	Venue	Position	Event	Notes
2011	United States Junior Championships	Eugene, Oregon	6th	200m	23.75
2012	United States Junior Championships	Bloomington, Indiana	5th (Heat 2, Heats)	100m	11.73
2014	NCAA Division I Women's Indoor Track and Field Championships	Albuquerque, New Mexico	1st (Race B)	200m	22.79
2015	NCAA Division I Women's Indoor Track and Field Championships	Fayetteville, Arkansas	1st	200m	22.63
2015	NCAA Division I Women's Outdoor Track and Field Championships	Eugene, Oregon	4th	200m	22.24
2015	United States Championships	Eugene, Oregon	6th	200m	22.56
2016	NCAA Division I Women's Indoor Track and Field Championships	Birmingham, Alabama	1st (Race B)	200m	22.83
2016	NCAA Division I Women's Indoor Track and Field Championships	Birmingham, Alabama	4th	400m	52.28
2016	United States Championships	Eugene, Oregon	7th (Heat 3, Semifinals)	200m	23.14
2017	NCAA Division I Women's Outdoor Track and Field Championships	Eugene, Oregon	1st	200m	22.02 CR
2017	United States Championships	Sacramento, California	5th	200m	22.68
2023	United States Championships	Eugene, Oregon	8th (Heat 1, Semifinals)	200m	23.08
