= Deborah John =

Trinidad and Tobago hurdler

Personal information
- Nationality: Trinidad and Tobago
- Born: 10 April 1990 (age 35)

Sport
- Sport: Hurdling
- Event: 100 metres hurdles

Deborah John (born 10 April 1990) is a Trinidad and Tobago hurdler. She competed in the women's 100 metres hurdles at the 2017 World Championships in Athletics.
