= Stanley Kebenei =

Kenyan-American distance runner

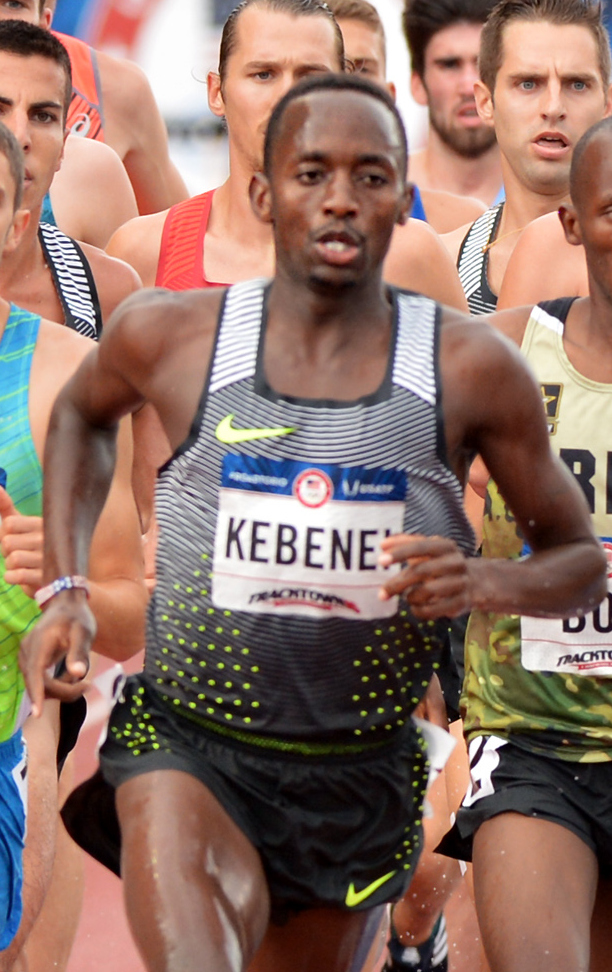
- Kebenei running steeplechase at the 2016 Olympic Trials

Personal information
- Nationality: American
- Born: November 6, 1989 (age 36)
- Height: 5.9

Sport
- Sport: Athletics
- Event(s): 3000 meters steeplechase, 5000 meters
- College team: Arkansas
- Club: Nike
- Turned pro: 2015
- Coached by: Scott simmos

Achievements and titles
- Highest world ranking: 15TH
- Personal bests: 3000 meters steeplechase: 8:08.32; 1500 meters: 3:46.13; 5000 meters: 13:42.15; 10,000 meters: 29:33.58
Medal record
Representing United States
NACAC Championships
Silver medal – second place	2015 Costa Rica	3000 m steeplechase

Stanley Kebenei (born November 6, 1989) is a Kenyan-American distance runner who ran for Iowa Central Community College and the University of Arkansas.

== Career ==
=== Iowa Central (2011–13) ===
Stanley Kebenei earned nine NJCAA national championship titles at Iowa Central Community College.

=== University of Arkansas ===
In 2014, Stanley Kebenei became the most recent senior in Arkansas history to earn all American honor at the NCAA National Cross Country Championships.

Stanley Kebenei earned six NCAA Division I Track and Field All-American honors and two NCAA Division I cross country awards.

=== Professional ===
Stanley Kebenei is a professional runner for Nike, Inc.

Kebenei won in 44:37 in the 2016 USATF 15 km championships in Jacksonville, Florida. Interview after 2016 USATF 15 km championship victory

Kebenei placed second in steeplechase at 2016 Payton Jordan Invitational in 8:22.85. Kebenei placed fifth in steeplechase at 2016 Diamond League Golden Gala in Rome in 8:18.52. As of June 3, 2016, Kebenei is ranked in the United States and twenty-sixth in the world going into the Trials.
