= Ryan Martin (athlete) =

American middle-distance runner

Personal information
- Nationality: American
- Born: March 23, 1989 (age 37) Laguna Niguel, California, U.S.
- Height: 1.85 m (6 ft 1 in)
- Weight: 63.3 kg (140 lb)

Sport
- Sport: Running
- Event: 800 metres

Achievements and titles
- Personal best: 800 m: 1:44.77
Medal record
Men's athletics
Representing the United States
Pan American Games
Bronze medal – third place	2015 Toronto	800 m
NACAC Championships
Gold medal – first place	2015 Costa Rica	800 m

Ryan Martin (born March 23, 1989) is an American Middle distance runner. Martin tried out to compete for the United States in the men's 800 m at the 2012 Summer Olympics in London, England. He is a professional runner for Asics.

== Personal ==
Martin was born in 1989 in Orange County, California, the son of Debra and Chris Martin.

== High school ==
Martin ran four seasons of track during his stay at Santa Margarita Catholic High School. Ryan Martin is the current school record holder at 800 meters with his time of 1:53.23 set at the CIF California State Meet where he finished in second place, and is a member of the 4x800m record setting team (7:51.51) with Kary Yergler, Mark Hirschboeck, and Jon Telles

Martin was a State Runner-up, 2-time C.I.F. SS Champion (2006, 2007), Orange County Champion, and League Champion numerous times.

During his senior season of track in his senior year, he burst onto the track scene, ranking nationally with a time of 1:53.28 in the 800 metres.

== College career ==
Martin attended the University of California, Santa Barbara; his majors were Business Economics and Art History. During his first year of track during the 2008–2012 season, Martin ran the 800 m for the first time, and led the Gauchos in the 800.

Martin advanced to the 2009 NCAA Outdoor finals of the 800m by placing second in Heat 3. The top two times in each heat, plus the next two fastest times overall, advanced to the final. Martin's time of 1:50.23 edged him past a runner from BYU who finished at 1:50.37. On Saturday, Martin finished eighth in the 800m final with a time of 1:52.12. It was a close race, with the winner crossing the line in 1:49.48. The fifth-place runner clocked a time of 1:50.60.

Martin earned points in Big West competition multiple years. He won the Big West 800m Championships in 2009 and 2011 running 1:49.85 and 1:45.34 respectfully. In 2010 and 2012 he placed 2nd running 1:48.43 and 1:44.77 respectfully. His time of 1:44.77 placed him 5th in the world at the time for 2012.

His time of 1:44.77 at the 2012 Big West Conference Championship was good for first on the all-time University of California, Santa Barbara 800 metres list. He was an NCAA all american three times in the 800, 2010, 2011 and 2012. The three-time All-American at UCSB was one of the youngest runners in at the 2012 Olympic Trails in Eugene and narrowly missed a berth to the London Olympic Games.

== Professional ==
In 2012, Martin placed 4th at the USA Trials. He made it through the semi-finals of the 2012 United States Olympic trials (track and field), but failed to qualify to the Olympics by placing 4th and running a 1:44.90 in his Final.

In 2013 Martin failed to qualify for the IAAF World Championships in Moscow, Russia by placing 23rd at the USA Outdoor Track Championships, running a 1:49.72.

At the 2014 USA Outdoor Track and Field Championships Martin placed 6th in 1:52.62 in the final.

At the 2015 USA Outdoor Track and Field Championships Martin placed 5th in 1:46.04 to qualify for the NACAC Championships in Costa Rica where Ryan won the 800 meters in championship and meet records running 1:45.79.

== Personal bests ==
Event	Time	Venue	Date
800 m (outdoor)	1:44.77	University of California, Irvine	May 13, 2012
