= 2013 World Championships in Athletics qualification standards =

The following marks are the A and B qualification standards for the 2013 World Championships in Athletics. The standards have been changed from the 2011 standards. Each country may send a maximum of four athletes who have attained the A qualification mark in each specific event. A maximum of three athletes can compete in that event, with the sole exception of the relays, in which four of a possible six athletes may compete. In the case that no athlete of that nationality has achieved the A standard in an event, a country may send two athletes with the B qualification times, of which only one may compete at the Championships.

Area Champions (i.e. athletes who have won an event at their continental level championships) are granted automatic entrance, irrespective of whether they have achieved the qualification marks. The reigning World Champion in each event is also granted a bye into the competition, and does not count as part of their country's quota of athletes in that event. Furthermore, host countries may enter one unqualified athlete if no one of the respective nationality has achieved the required mark.

== Qualification standards ==
Event	Men's		Women's	
Event	A	B	A	B
100 m	10.15	10.21	11.28	11.36
200 m	20.52	20.60	23.05	23.30
400 m	45.28	45.60	51.55	52.35
800 m	1:45.30	1:46.20	2:00.00	2:01.50
1500 m	3:35.00	3:37.00	4:05.50	4:09.00
5000 m	13:15.00	13:20.00	15:18.00	15:24.00
10,000 m	27:40.00	28:05.00	31:15.00	32:05.00
Marathon	2:17:00		2:43:00	
3000 m steeplechase	8:26.10	8:32.00	9:43.00	9:48.00
100 m hurdles	—	—	12.94	13.10
110 m hurdles	13.40	13.50	—	—
400 m hurdles	49.40	49.60	55.40	56.55
High jump	2.31 m	2.28 m	1.95 m	1.92 m
Pole vault	5.70 m	5.60 m	4.60 m	4.50 m
Long jump	8.25 m	8.10 m	6.75 m	6.65 m
Triple jump	17.20 m	16.85 m	14.40 m	14.20 m
Shot put	20.60 m	20.10 m	18.30 m	17.20 m
Discus throw	66.00 m	64.00 m	62.00 m	59.50 m
Hammer throw	79.00 m	76.00 m	72.00 m	69.50 m
Javelin throw	83.50 m	81.00 m	62.00 m	60.00 m
Heptathlon	—	—	6100 pts	5950 pts
Decathlon	8200 pts	8000 pts	—	—
20 km race walk	1:24:00	1:26:00	1:36:00	1:38:00
50 km race walk	4:02:00	4:16:00	—	—
4 × 100 m relay	39.20		44.00	
4 × 400 m relay	3:05:00		3:33.00	
