= Jamaal James =

Trinidadian athletics competitor

Personal information
- Born: 4 September 1988 (age 37) Port of Spain, Trinidad and Tobago

Sport
- Sport: Track and field

Jamaal James (born September 4, 1988) is a former professional 800m runner from Trinidad and Tobago, he represented his country internationally at the age group and elite level. James graduated from Louisiana State University(LSU) in 2010 with a degree in Communication Studies. At LSU James earned both National Collegiate Athletic Association (NCAA) Indoor All-American and South Eastern Conference (SEC) honors between 2007 and 2010. His personal record is 1:46.57 achieved in Ninove, Belgium. He is also the national junior 800m record holder for his country with the time of 1:47.00.

== Collegiate career ==
He ran for Louisiana State University as a member of the LSU Tigers track and field team, and became a 3x All American, 2x South Eastern Conference (SEC) Champion and 6x ALL SEC performer, from 2007 to 2010.

== International competitions ==
Year	Competition	Venue	Position	Event	Notes
Representing Trinidad and Tobago
2003	CARIFTA Games (U17)	Port of Spain, Trinidad and Tobago	1st	800m	1:56.15
2004	CARIFTA Games (U17)	Hamilton, Bermuda	2nd	800m	1:55.76
2004	CARIFTA Games (U17)	Hamilton, Bermuda	1st	4x400m relay	3:47.24
2004	Central American and Caribbean Junior Championships (U17)	Veracruz, Mexico	1st	800m	1:53.93
2005	Pan American Junior Athletics Championships (U20)	Windsor, Ontario, Canada,	4th	800m	1:51.01
2005	World Youth Championships (U18)	Marrakesh, Morocco	5th	800m	1:50.31
2006	CARIFTA Games (U20)	Les Abymes, Guadeloupe	1st	800m	1:52.64
2006	Central American and Caribbean Junior Championships (U20)	Port of Spain, Trinidad and Tobago	1st	800m	1:51.73
2006	Central American and Caribbean Games	Cartagena, Colombia	6th	800m	1:48.98
2006	World Junior Championships in Athletics	Beijing, China	7sf1	800m	1:50.42
2007	Pan American Junior Athletics Championships	São Paulo, Brazil	2nd	800m	1:48.87
2012	IAAF World Indoor Championships	Istanbul, Turkey	3h5	800m	1:52.71
2014	Athletics at the 2014 Commonwealth Games	Glasgow, Scotland	4h4	800m	1:51.62
2015	2015 NACAC Championships in Athletics	San José, Costa Rica	3rd	800m	1:47.07
