= Tiffany Williams =

American hurdler (born 1983)

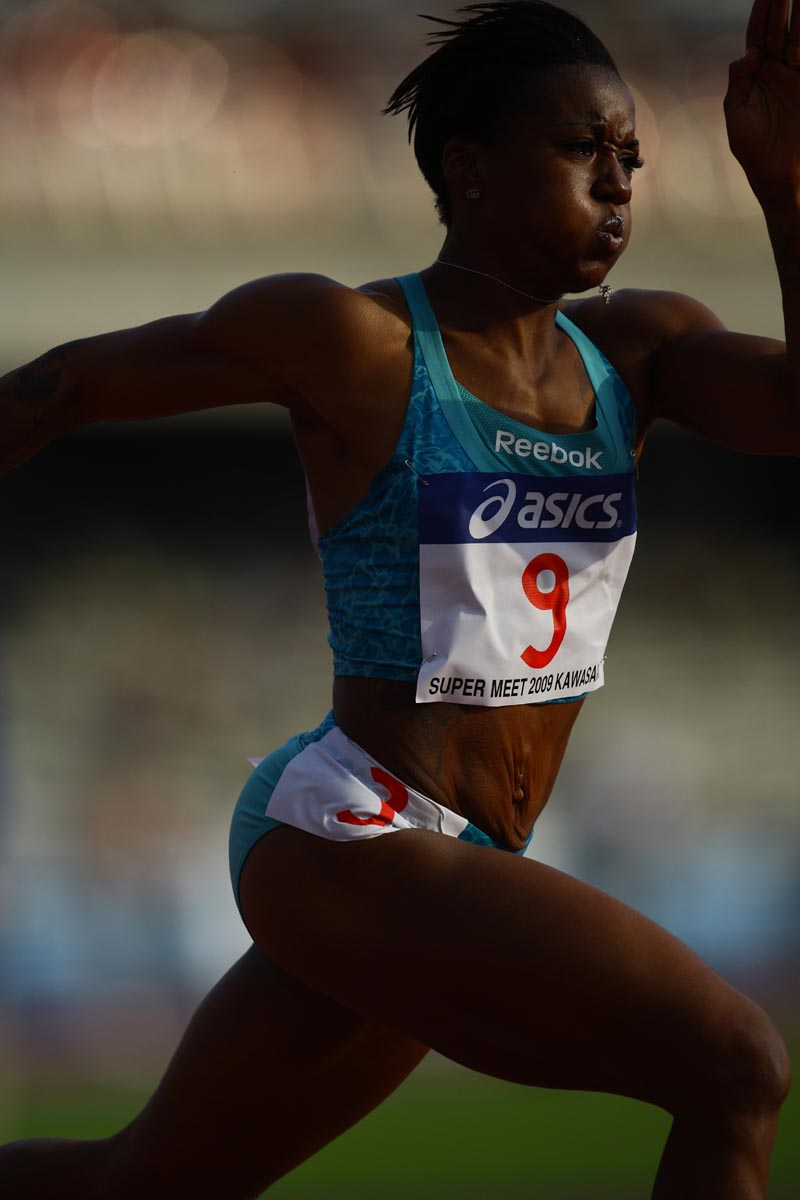

Personal information
- Born: February 5, 1983 (age 43) Miami, Florida, U.S.

Sport
- Sport: Running
- Event: 400 metres hurdles
Medal record
US National Championships
Gold medal – first place	2008	400 m hurdles
Gold medal – first place	2007	400 m hurdles
IAAF World Athletics Final
Silver medal – second place	2006 Stuttgart	400 m hurdles

Tiffany Williams (née Ross; born 5 February 1983 in Miami, Florida) is an American hurdler who is a former US 400m hurdles champion in 2007 and 2008.

She had a standout collegiate career at the University of South Carolina, as SEC champion 3 years in a row and a 15 time all American.

She finished fourth at the 2002 World Junior Championships and second at the 2006 World Athletics Final. In addition she won a silver medal in 4 x 400 metres relay at the 2006 World Indoor Championships. She qualified for the 2008 US Olympic team by winning the final of the 400 m hurdles at the 2008 US Olympic Trials in Eugene, Oregon.

Her personal best time for the 400 m hurdles is 53.28 seconds, achieved in June 2007 in Indianapolis.

Williams returned to form in 2012 running 55.01 her fastest time in 3 years in a meeting in Turkey.
