= Harry Adams (sprinter) =

American sprinter (born 1989)

Personal information
- Nationality: United States
- Born: November 27, 1989 (age 36) Fort Lauderdale, Florida, U.S.
- Height: 6 ft 0 in (183 cm)
- Weight: 180 lb (82 kg)

Sport
- Sport: Running
- Events: 100 metres, 200 metres
- College team: Auburn Tigers

Achievements and titles
- Personal bests: 100 m: 9.96 (Des Moines 2012); 200 m: 20.10 (Coral Gables 2012)

Harry Adams (born November 27, 1989) is an American sprinter who specialises in the 100 and 200 metres. He attended Auburn University. At the 2012 NCAA outdoor track championships in Des Moines, Iowa, Adams became the 81st sprinter to break the 10-second barrier over 100 metres. His 9.96 sec also broke Auburn's school record, previously held by Coby Miller.

A native of Fort Lauderdale, Florida, Adams attended Dillard High School, where he excelled in track and football. Regarded as a three-star recruit by Rivals.com, Adams was ranked as the No. 56 wide receiver prospect of his class. As a sophomore, Adams was named to the 2006 USA Today All-USA boys high school track team.

Adams attended Auburn University, where he was also part of the football varsity in 2008 and 2009. Adams is currently a graduate assistant sprints coach at Concord University
