= Russell Winger =

American track and field athlete

Personal information
- Nickname: Russ
- Born: August 2, 1984 (age 41) Colorado Springs, Colorado
- Height: 6 ft 3 in (191 cm)
- Weight: 280 lb (127 kg)

Sport
- Sport: Track and field
- Event: Discus throw
- College team: University of Idaho
- Coached by: Ty Sevin
Medal record
Representing United States
Pan American Games
Bronze medal – third place	2015 Toronto	Discus throw
- Updated on August 31, 2015

Russell Adam Winger (born August 2, 1984) is an American track and field athlete specializing in the discus throw and shot put. He competed in the discus throw at the 2015 World Championships in Beijing without qualifying for the final. In addition, he won the bronze medal at the 2015 Pan American Games and gold at the 2015 NACAC Championships.

His wife, Kara Winger is also an athlete, the North American Continental record holder in the javelin throw under her maiden name of Patterson.

== Competition record ==
Year	Competition	Venue	Position	Event	Notes
Representing the United States
2006	NACAC U23 Championships	Santo Domingo, Dominican Republic	2nd	Shot put	19.35 m
2011	Pan American Games	Guadalajara, Mexico	8th	Discus throw	19.11 m
2015	Pan American Games	Toronto, Canada	3rd	Discus throw	62.64 m
2015	NACAC Championships	San José, Costa Rica	1st	Discus throw	60.68 m
2015	World Championships	Beijing, China	26th (q)	Discus throw	58.69 m

== Personal bests ==
Outdoor

- Shot put – 21.25 (Tucson 2010)
- Discus throw – 66.04 (Chula Vista 2011)
- Javelin throw – 64.54 (Claremont 2014)

Indoor

- Shot put – 21.29 (Fayetteville 2008)

== See also ==
- United States at the 2015 World Championships in Athletics
