= 2010 World Junior Championships in Athletics – Men's 4 × 100 metres relay =

The men's 4×100 metres relay event at the 2010 World Junior Championships in Athletics was held in Moncton, New Brunswick, Canada, at Moncton Stadium on 23 and 24 July.

== Medalists ==
Gold	Michael Granger; Charles Silmon; Eric Harris; Oliver Bradwell; United States
Silver	Brandon Tomlinson; Bernard Brady; O'Dean Skeen; Dexter Lee; Jamaica
Bronze	Jamol James; Sabian Cox; Moriba Morain; Shermund Allsop; Trinidad and Tobago

== Results ==
=== Final ===
24 July

Rank	Nation	Competitors	Time	Notes
1st place, gold medalist(s)	United States	Michael Granger; Charles Silmon; Eric Harris; Oliver Bradwell	38.93	
2nd place, silver medalist(s)	Jamaica	Brandon Tomlinson; Bernard Brady; O'Dean Skeen; Dexter Lee	39.55	
3rd place, bronze medalist(s)	Trinidad and Tobago	Jamol James; Sabian Cox; Moriba Morain; Shermund Allsop	39.72	
4	Japan	Takumi Kuki; Ryo Onabuta; Jun Kimura; Shōta Iizuka	39.89	
5	Germany	Roy Schmidt; Robin Erewa; Florian Hübner; Felix Gehne	39.97	
6	Thailand	Jirapong Meenapra; Tossaporn Boonhan; Weerawat Pharueang; Suppachai Chimdee	40.26	
	Nigeria	Jonathan Nmaju; Elvis Ukale; Ayobani Oyebiyi; Isah Salihu	DQ	IAAF rule 163.3
	United Kingdom	Jordan Huggins; Daniel Talbot; Henry Tobais; Kieran Showler-Davis	DNF	

=== Heats ===
23 July

==== Heat 1 ====
Rank	Nation	Competitors	Time	Notes
1	Jamaica	Dwayne Extol; Bernard Brady; O'Dean Skeen; Dexter Lee	39.74	Q
2	Trinidad and Tobago	Jamol James; Sabian Cox; Kevin Haynes; Shermund Allsop	39.88	Q
3	France	Jean-Pierre Bertrand; Jimmy Vicaut; Vincent Michalet; Jeffrey John	40.11	
4	South Africa	Waide Jooste; Wayde Van Niekerk; Gideon Trotter; Dean Goosen	40.32	
5	Canada	Tyler Macleod; Segun Makinde; Phillip Hayle; Gregory MacNeill	40.38	
	Czech Republic	Martin Ricar; Pavel Maslák; Lukáš Haloun; Rostislav Navrátil	DNF	
	Saudi Arabia	Rashed Al-Huzali; Mahmoud Ibrahim; Abdullah Al-Asiri; Mohamed Sico Ibrahim	DNF	

==== Heat 2 ====
Rank	Nation	Competitors	Time	Notes
1	United States	Michael Granger; Charles Silmon; Joeal Hotchkins; Marvin Bracy	39.69	Q
2	Nigeria	Jonathan Nmaju; Elvis Ukale; Ayobani Oyebiyi; Isah Salihu	39.95	Q
3	Thailand	Jirapong Meenapra; Tossaporn Boonhan; Weerawat Pharueang; Suppachai Chimdee	40.00	q
4	Poland	Mateusz Jędrusik; Adam Pawłowski; Artur Szczęśniak; Grzegorz Zimniewicz	40.24	
5	Belgium	Pieter-Jan Buyens; Frederick Claes; Pieter De Rycke; Julien Watrin	40.43	
6	Bahamas	Trevorvano Mackey; Warren Fraser; Geno Jones; Alfred Higgs	40.58	
	Australia	Jake Hammond; Patrick Fakiye; Mathew Turk; Tom Gamble	DNF	

==== Heat 3 ====
Rank	Nation	Competitors	Time	Notes
1	Japan	Takumi Kuki; Ryo Onabuta; Jun Kimura; Shōta Iizuka	40.04	Q
2	Germany	Roy Schmidt; Robin Erewa; Florian Hübner; Patrick Kuhn	40.06	Q
3	United Kingdom	Jordan Huggins; Sam Watts; Henry Tobais; Junior Ejehu	40.07	q
4	Brazil	Gustavo dos Santos; Jackson da Silva; Antônio Rodrigues; Caio Cézar dos Santos	40.56	
5	Spain	David Alejandro; Alberto Gavaldá; Adrián Pérez; Eusebio Cáceres	40.82	
6	Zimbabwe	Michael Chiduku; Paul Madzivire; Narada Jackson; Fungai Bvekerwa	42.21	
7	Bahrain	Husain Mohamed Hasan; Mohamed Jassim Mohamed; Ali Al-Doseri; Salman Dawood Al-Balooshi	42.93	

== Participation ==
According to an unofficial count, 91 athletes from 21 countries participated in the event.

- Australia (4)
- Bahamas (4)
- Bahrain (4)
- Belgium (4)
- Brazil (4)
- Canada (4)
- Czech Republic (4)
- France (4)
- Germany (5)
- Jamaica (5)
- Japan (4)
- Nigeria (4)
- Poland (4)
- Saudi Arabia (4)
- South Africa (4)
- Spain (4)
- Thailand (4)
- Trinidad and Tobago (5)
- United Kingdom (6)
- United States (6)
- Zimbabwe (4)
