= 2010 World Junior Championships in Athletics – Men's 200 metres =

The men's 200 metres event at the 2010 World Junior Championships in Athletics was held in Moncton, New Brunswick, Canada, at Moncton Stadium on 22 and 23 July.

== Medalists ==
Gold	Shōta Iizuka; Japan
Silver	Aliaksandr Linnik; Belarus
Bronze	Aaron Brown; Canada

== Results ==
=== Final ===
23 July
Wind: +0.5 m/s

Rank	Name	Nationality	Time	Notes
1st place, gold medalist(s)	Shōta Iizuka	Japan	20.67	
2nd place, silver medalist(s)	Aliaksandr Linnik	Belarus	20.89	
3rd place, bronze medalist(s)	Aaron Brown	Canada	21.00	
4	Wayde Van Niekerk	South Africa	21.02	
5	Robin Erewa	Germany	21.09	
6	Moriba Morain	Trinidad and Tobago	21.10	
7	Pavel Maslák	Czech Republic	21.13	
8	Mateusz Biegajlo	Poland	21.47	

=== Semifinals ===
22 July

==== Semifinal 1 ====
Wind: +2.1 m/s

Rank	Name	Nationality	Time	Notes
1	Wayde Van Niekerk	South Africa	21.05 w	Q
2	Aaron Brown	Canada	21.12 w	Q
3	Oliver Bradwell	United States	21.12 w	
4	Daniel Talbot	United Kingdom	21.19 w	
5	Roy Schmidt	Germany	21.25 w	
6	Mathew Turk	Australia	21.28 w	
7	Jun Kimura	Japan	21.53 w	
	Jackson da Silva	Brazil	DQ	IAAF rule 162.7

==== Semifinal 2 ====
Wind: +2.0 m/s

Rank	Name	Nationality	Time	Notes
1	Aliaksandr Linnik	Belarus	20.81	Q
2	Moriba Morain	Trinidad and Tobago	21.03	Q
3	Mateusz Biegajlo	Poland	21.08	q
4	Robin Erewa	Germany	21.08	q
5	Suppachai Chimdee	Thailand	21.11	
6	Kieran Showler-Davis	United Kingdom	21.18	
7	Trevorvano Mackey	Bahamas	21.71	
	Bruno Hortelano	Spain	DNS	

==== Semifinal 3 ====
Wind: +2.3 m/s

Rank	Name	Nationality	Time	Notes
1	Shōta Iizuka	Japan	20.93 w	Q
2	Pavel Maslák	Czech Republic	21.07 w	Q
3	Julien Watrin	Belgium	21.12 w	
4	Segun Makinde	Canada	21.13 w	
5	Eric Harris	United States	21.23 w	
6	Jake Hammond	Australia	21.28 w	
7	Remigiusz Olszewski	Poland	21.31 w	
8	Arturo Ramírez	Venezuela	21.80 w	

=== Heats ===
22 July

==== Heat 1 ====
Wind: +0.2 m/s

Rank	Name	Nationality	Time	Notes
1	Wayde Van Niekerk	South Africa	21.10	Q
2	Eric Harris	United States	21.22	Q
3	Jake Hammond	Australia	21.37	Q
4	Arturo Ramírez	Venezuela	21.56	q
5	Antônio Rodrigues	Brazil	21.60	
6	Bruno Fernandes	Portugal	21.80	
7	Jonathan Nmaju	Nigeria	21.82	
8	Carlos Sullivan	Puerto Rico	21.96	

==== Heat 2 ====
Wind: +0.7 m/s

Rank	Name	Nationality	Time	Notes
1	Shōta Iizuka	Japan	21.13	Q
2	Mateusz Biegajlo	Poland	21.23	Q
3	Segun Makinde	Canada	21.43	Q
4	Delano Williams	Turks and Caicos Islands	21.56	
5	Alessandro Pedrazzoli	Italy	21.75	
6	Shekeim Greaves	Barbados	21.77	
7	Adolphe Ehui	Côte d'Ivoire	74.03	
	Joseph Suberan	Cayman Islands	DNF	

==== Heat 3 ====
Wind: +0.7 m/s

Rank	Name	Nationality	Time	Notes
1	Roy Schmidt	Germany	21.21	Q
2	Pavel Maslák	Czech Republic	21.31	Q
3	Kieran Showler-Davis	United Kingdom	21.38	Q
4	Remigiusz Olszewski	Poland	21.42	q
5	Vadim Grigoryev	Russia	21.92	
6	Mohamed Jassim Mohamed	Bahrain	22.11	
7	Mohamed Al-Jumaah	Iraq	22.15	
8	John Rivan	Papua New Guinea	22.54	

==== Heat 4 ====
Wind: +0.5 m/s

Rank	Name	Nationality	Time	Notes
1	Robin Erewa	Germany	21.14	Q
2	Mathew Turk	Australia	21.44	Q
3	Jackson da Silva	Brazil	21.73	Q
4	Joseph Millar	New Zealand	21.80	
5	Sean De Klerk	South Africa	22.14	
	Dexter Lee	Jamaica	DQ	IAAF rule 162.7
	Hensley Paulina	Netherlands Antilles	DQ	IAAF rule 162.7
	Jeffrey John	France	DQ	IAAF rule 162.7

==== Heat 5 ====
Wind: +0.9 m/s

Rank	Name	Nationality	Time	Notes
1	Aliaksandr Linnik	Belarus	21.14	Q
2	Moriba Morain	Trinidad and Tobago	21.30	Q
3	Daniel Talbot	United Kingdom	21.36	Q
4	Oliver Bradwell	United States	21.42	q
5	Jun Kimura	Japan	21.52	q
6	Lorenzo Valentini	Italy	21.60	
7	Jossuah Brena	France	22.15	
8	Laron Hield	Bahamas	22.15	

==== Heat 6 ====
Wind: +0.3 m/s

Rank	Name	Nationality	Time	Notes
1	Julien Watrin	Belgium	21.18	Q
2	Aaron Brown	Canada	21.21	Q
3	Suppachai Chimdee	Thailand	21.39	Q
4	Trevorvano Mackey	Bahamas	21.42	q
5	Bruno Hortelano	Spain	21.51	q
6	Jeneko Place	Bermuda	22.07	
7	Sin Jin-Suk	South Korea	22.27	

== Participation ==
According to an unofficial count, 47 athletes from 35 countries participated in the event.

- Australia (2)
- Bahamas (2)
- Bahrain (1)
- Barbados (1)
- Belarus (1)
- Belgium (1)
- Bermuda (1)
- Brazil (2)
- Canada (2)
- Cayman Islands (1)
- Côte d'Ivoire (1)
- Czech Republic (1)
- France (2)
- Germany (2)
- Iraq (1)
- Italy (2)
- Jamaica (1)
- Japan (2)
- Netherlands Antilles (1)
- New Zealand (1)
- Nigeria (1)
- Papua New Guinea (1)
- Poland (2)
- Portugal (1)
- Puerto Rico (1)
- Russia (1)
- South Africa (2)
- South Korea (1)
- Spain (1)
- Thailand (1)
- Trinidad and Tobago (1)
- Turks and Caicos Islands (1)
- United Kingdom (2)
- United States (2)
- Venezuela (1)
