= 2008 World Junior Championships in Athletics – Men's 4 × 100 metres relay =

The men's 4x100 metres relay event at the 2008 World Junior Championships in Athletics was held in Bydgoszcz, Poland, at Zawisza Stadium on 11 and 12 July.

== Medalists ==
Gold	Dante Sales; Antonio Sales; Marquise Goodwin; Terrell Wilks; United States
Silver	Oshane Bailey; Dexter Lee; Nickel Ashmeade; Yohan Blake; Jamaica
Bronze	Johannes Mosala; Roscoe Engel; Patrick Vosloo; Wilhelm van der Vyver; South Africa

== Results ==
=== Final ===
12 July

Rank	Nation	Competitors	Time	Notes
1st place, gold medalist(s)	United States	Dante Sales; Antonio Sales; Marquise Goodwin; Terrell Wilks	38.98	
2nd place, silver medalist(s)	Jamaica	Oshane Bailey; Dexter Lee; Nickel Ashmeade; Yohan Blake	39.25	
3rd place, bronze medalist(s)	South Africa	Johannes Mosala; Roscoe Engel; Patrick Vosloo; Wilhelm van der Vyver	39.70	
4	Japan	Genki Kawai; Seiya Hane; Masanori Kaji; Yuichi Kobayashi	39.89	
5	United Kingdom	Olufunmi Sobodu; Junior Ejehu; James Alaka; Richard Kilty	39.89	
6	Trinidad and Tobago	Abiola Glasgow; Kendall Bacchus; Zwade Edwards; Shermund Allsop	40.16	
7	Chinese Taipei	Liang Tse-Ching; Wang Ming-En; Pan Po-Yu; Su Yung-Chun	40.17	
8	Thailand	Poommanus Jankem; Wattana Deewong; Weerawat Pharueang; Suppachai Chimdee	40.28	

=== Heats ===
11 July

==== Heat 1 ====
Rank	Nation	Competitors	Time	Notes
1	United Kingdom	Olufunmi Sobodu; Junior Ejehu; James Alaka; Richard Kilty	39.84	Q
2	Japan	Genki Kawai; Seiya Hane; Masanori Kaji; Yuichi Kobayashi	39.95	Q
3	Thailand	Poommanus Jankem; Wattana Deewong; Weerawat Pharueang; Suppachai Chimdee	40.16	q
4	Italy	Edoardo Baini; Diego Marani; Davide Manenti; Valerio Rosichini	40.41	
5	Poland	Gustaw Jacewicz; Artur Zaczek; Michal Partyka; Lukasz Gauza	40.61	
6	France	Romain Burel; Martin Lamy; Frédéric Mignot; Tom Chouquet	40.83	
7	Turkey	Ferhat Altunkalem; Izzet Safer; Emre Karademir; Semih Sencer	41.65	

==== Heat 2 ====
Rank	Nation	Competitors	Time	Notes
1	Jamaica	Oshane Bailey; Dexter Lee; Rasheed Dwyer; Yohan Blake	39.62	Q
2	Chinese Taipei	Liang Tse-Ching; Wang Ming-En; Pan Po-Yu; Su Yung-Chun	40.16	Q
3	Czech Republic	Martin Ricar; Lukáš Štastný; Pavel Maslák; Václav Zich	40.60	
4	Sweden	Maximus Fröjd; Alexander Nordkvist; Benjamin Olsson; Oskar Åberg	40.72	
5	Nigeria	Olawuyi Rahmeen; Femi Owolade; Ufomba Chime; Ayokunle Odelusi	40.74	
6	Canada	Michael Robertson; Phillip Hayle; Daniel Harper; Tyrone Halstead	41.33	
	Germany	Roy Schmidt; Robert Hering; Jasper Henkel; Markus Brandt	DNF	

==== Heat 3 ====
Rank	Nation	Competitors	Time	Notes
1	United States	Dante Sales; Antonio Sales; Marquise Goodwin; Terrell Wilks	39.37	Q
2	South Africa	Johannes Mosala; Roscoe Engel; Patrick Vosloo; Wilhelm van der Vyver	39.59	Q
3	Trinidad and Tobago	Abiola Glasgow; Kendall Bacchus; Zwade Edwards; Shermund Allsop	40.40	q
4	Russia	Mikhail Yakovlev; Aleksandr Shpaer; Konstantin Shabanov; Igor Borzov	40.43	
5	Austria	Stephan Ender; Bernhard Chudarek; Lukas Reiter; Dominik Distelberger	40.80	
6	Senegal	Papa Ousmane Ndiaye; Aliou Wagne; Ibrahima Seye; Edouard Ndecky	42.44	
	Spain	Sergio González; Javier Sanz; Alberto Gavaldá; Eusebio Cáceres	DNF	

== Participation ==
According to an unofficial count, 85 athletes from 21 countries participated in the event.

- Austria (4)
- Canada (4)
- Chinese Taipei (4)
- Czech Republic (4)
- France (4)
- Germany (4)
- Italy (4)
- Jamaica (5)
- Japan (4)
- Nigeria (4)
- Poland (4)
- Russia (4)
- Senegal (4)
- South Africa (4)
- Spain (4)
- Sweden (4)
- Thailand (4)
- Trinidad and Tobago (4)
- Turkey (4)
- United Kingdom (4)
- United States (4)
