= 2010 Central American and Caribbean Junior Championships =

XVIII Central American and Caribbean Junior Championships
- Dates: 2–4 July
- Host city: Santo Domingo, Dominican Republic
- Venue: Felix Sanchez Olympic Stadium
- Level: Junior and Youth
- Events: 80 (44 junior, 36 youth)
- Participation: 532/500 (205 junior, 195 youth) athletes from 27 nations
- Records set: 12 championship records

The 18th Central American and Caribbean Junior Championships were held in the Estadio Olímpico Félix Sánchez in Santo Domingo, Dominican Republic, between 2–4 July 2011, and organized by the Federación Dominicana de Asociaciones de Atletismo (FDAA). The event was open for athletes from the invited countries, that are members of the Central American and Caribbean Athletic Confederation (CACAC), in two categories: Junior A Category: 17 to 19 years as of 31 December 2010 (Born between 1991 and 1993), and Junior B Category: 14 to 16 years as of 31 December 2010 (Born between 1994 and 1996). By IAAF standards, Junior A is equal to Junior, while Junior B is equal to Youth.

In the Junior A category, a lot of athletes were preparing for the 13th World Junior Championships in Moncton, New Brunswick, Canada on 19–25 July 2010, while in the Junior B category, many athletes were preparing for the inaugural Youth Olympic Games in Singapore 14–26 August.

The team from Jamaica dominated the games gaining a total of 63 medals (25 gold, 20 silver, 18 bronze), more than twice as much as the next team, Mexico with 28 medals. Moreover, Jamaica won the team trophies in all categories leading the corresponding point classifications.

The results are appreciated in detail.

== Records ==
A total of 12 new championship records were set.

| Event | Record | Athlete | Country | Type |
Boys Under 20 (Junior)
| 400 m hurdles | 50.26 | Jehue Gordon | Trinidad and Tobago | CR |
| Shot put | 18.32m | Chad Wright | Jamaica | CR |
| Discus throw | 62.93m | Quincy Wilson | Trinidad and Tobago | CR |
| 4 × 100 m relay | 39.77 | Jamol James; Sabian Cox; Moriba Morain; Shermund Allsop | Trinidad and Tobago | CR |
Girls Under 20 (Junior)
| 2000 m steeplechase | 6:54.14 | Azucena Rodríguez | Mexico | CR |
Boys Under 17 (Youth)
| Triple jump | 15.20m | Lathone Collie-Minns | Bahamas | CR |
| Shot put | 17.46m | Hezekiel Romeo | Trinidad and Tobago | CR |
| 4 × 400 m relay | 3:16.30 | Michael Lockhart; Andre Wells; Ashley Riley; Stephen Newbold | Bahamas | CR |
Girls Under 17 (Youth)
| 400 m | 53.39 | Shaunae Miller | Bahamas | CR |
| High jump | 1.81m | Catherine Nina | Dominican Republic | CR |
| High jump | 1.81m | Akela Jones | Barbados | CR |
| Javelin throw | 41.83m | Daliadiz Ortíz | Puerto Rico | CR |

Key

AR – Area record • CR – Championship record • NR – National record

== Medal summary ==
The results are published. Events marked as "Exhibition" did not meet the official conditions with respect to the minimum number of participants ("not less than five (5) competitors of three (3) countries"). In the Male Junior B category, there is no information on the originally scheduled events "5000 m race walk" and "octathlon".

=== Male Junior A (under 20) ===
| Event | Gold | | Silver | | Bronze | |
|---|---|---|---|---|---|---|
| 100 metres (−1.4 m/s) | Bernardo Breads (JAM) | 10.64 | Jason Rogers (SKN) | 10.66 | Sabian Cox (TRI) | 10.68 |
| 200 metres (−2.4 m/s) | Moriba Morain (TRI) | 21.26 | Brandon Tomlinson (JAM) | 21.58 | Arturo Ramírez (VEN) | 21.71 |
| 400 metres | Omar Longart (VEN) | 46.75 | Luguelín Santos (DOM) | 46.94 | Deon Lendore (TRI) | 47.16 |
| 800 metres | Shaquille Dill (BER) | 1:52.92 | Henry Stevens-Carty (BER) | 1:53.74 | Christopher Sandoval (MEX) | 1:54.23 |
| 1500 metres | Kemoy Campbell (JAM) | 3:52.13 | Erick Estrada (PUR) | 3:52.92 | Christopher Sandoval (MEX) | 3:53.30 |
| 5000 metres | Fernando Román (PUR) | 15:35.68 | Diego Bautista (MEX) | 15:43.20 | Delohnni Nicol-Samuel (VIN) | 16:05.68 |
| 10,000 metres (exhibition) | Diego Bautista (MEX) | 33:22.28 | José Rubiera (DOM) | 34:06.17 | | |
| 110 metres hurdles (−1.0 m/s) | Greggmar Swift (BAR) | 13.90 | Stefan Fennell (JAM) | 14.07 | Raymundo Domínguez (DOM) | 14.34 |
| 400 metres hurdles | Jehue Gordon (TRI) | 50.26 CR | Leslie Murray (ISV) | 51.45 | Juan Pablo Martínez (DOM) | 52.01 |
| 3000 m steeplechase (exhibition) | Fernando Román (PUR) | 9:13.84 | Álvaro Abreu (DOM) | 9:19.86 | Delohnni Nicol-Samuel (VIN) | 9:46.97 |
| High jump | Jeffrey Burgos (PUR) | 2.14m | Raymond Higgs (BAH) | 2.11m | Troy Bullard (BAH) | 2.08m |
| Pole vault | Roberto Patiño (MEX) | 4.50m | Emmanuel Rivera (PUR) | 4.35m | Devon Dobson (JAM) | 4.00m |
| Long jump | Kamal Fuller (JAM) | 7.56m (1.0 m/s) | Jeffrey Burgos (PUR) | 7.40m (0.4 m/s) | Raymond Higgs (BAH) | 7.35m (−0.4 m/s) |
| Triple jump | Elton Walcott (TRI) | 15.42m (−1.2 m/s) | Alberto Álvarez (MEX) | 15.21m (−1.6 m/s) | Jason Castro (HON) | 14.87m (−1.4 m/s) |
| Shot put | Chad Wright (JAM) | 18.32m CR | Robert Collingwood (TRI) | 17.75m | Quincy Wilson (TRI) | 17.43m |
| Discus throw | Quincy Wilson (TRI) | 62.93m CR | Chad Wright (JAM) | 60.52m | Travis Smikle (JAM) | 57.20m |
| Hammer throw | Enrique Gaitán (GUA) | 56.47m | Alexis Figueroa (PUR) | 56.15m | José Gaticia (MEX) | 53.97m |
| Javelin throw | Keshorn Walcott (TRI) | 67.01m | David Ocampo (MEX) | 63.44m | Kenny Méndez (PUR) | 62.40m |
| Decathlon | Gustavo Morua (MEX) | 6861 | Ricardo Herrada (VEN) | 6158 | Tre Adderley (BAH) | 5373 |
| 10,000 metres race walk | Cristian Gómez (MEX) | 45:45.36 | Luis Ángel López (PUR) | 47:09.40 | Gabriel Calvo (CRC) | 49:33.38 |
| 4 × 100 metres relay | Trinidad and Tobago; Jamol James; Sabian Cox; Moriba Morain; Shermund Allsop | 39.77 CR | Jamaica; Bernado Breads; Julian Forte; Jeffrey Josephs; Brandon Tomlinson | 40.07 | Dominican Republic; Enamnuel Brioso; Lewis Gonnel; Jorge Ortíz; Andimin Santana | 40.36 |
| 4 × 400 metres relay | Trinidad and Tobago; Kishon Dempster; Deon Lendore; Osei Alleyne-Forte; Jehue Gordon | 3:08.19 | Jamaica; Jermaine Gayle; Dwayne Extol; Naseive Denton; Demar Murray | 3:09.18 | Dominican Republic; Luguelín Santos; Josue Beltre; Juan Pablo Martínez; Joel Mejía | 3:10.55 |

=== Female Junior A (under 20) ===
| Event | Gold | | Silver | | Bronze | |
|---|---|---|---|---|---|---|
| 100 metres (−1.8 m/s) | Seidatha Palmer (JAM) | 11.88 | Fany Chalas (DOM) | 11.97 | Diandra Gilbert (JAM) | 12.01 |
| 200 metres (−1.3 m/s) | Allison Peter (ISV) | 23.32 | Kai Selvon (TRI) | 23.42 | Fany Chalas (DOM) | 23.94 |
| 400 metres | Chantel Malone (IVB) | 53.10 | Janieve Russell (JAM) | 53.68 | Rashan Brown (BAH) | 53.76 |
| 800 metres | Natoya Goule (JAM) | 2:07.20 | Alena Brooks (TRI) | 2:09.29 | Jessica James (TRI) | 2:09.80 |
| 1500 metres | Sharlene Nickle (JAM) | 4:44.39 | Maria Mencebo (DOM) | 4:44.40 | Mackola Joseph (JAM) | 4:45.80 |
| 3000 metres | Vianney Villanueva (MEX) | 10:24.38 | Azucena Rodríguez (MEX) | 10:28.89 | Yordania Díaz (DOM) | 10:55.10 |
| 5000 metres (exhibition) | Vianney Villanueva (MEX) | 17:51.88 | Leomelky Novas (DOM) | 20:31.79 | | |
| 100 metres hurdles (-3.2 m/s) | Danielle Williams (JAM) | 14.11 | Ivanique Kemp (BAH) | 14.35 | Natshalie Isaac (PUR) | 14.60 |
| 400 metres hurdles | Ristananna Tracey (JAM) | 58.59 | Danielle Dowie (JAM) | 58.94 | Gabriela Cumberbatch (TRI) | 59.44 |
| 2000 m steeplechase (exhibition) | Azucena Rodríguez (MEX) | 6:54.14 CR | Ashley Laureano (PUR) | 7:28.66 | | |
| High jump | Massiel Jiménez (DOM) | 1.79m | Alysbeth Felix (PUR) | 1.73m ^{†} | Peta-Gaye Reid (JAM) | 1.73m ^{†} |
| Pole vault (exhibition) | Tiziana Ruíz (MEX) | 3.45m | Hiyadili Melo (DOM) | 3.30m | | |
| Long jump | Meruska Eduarda (AHO) | 6.13m (0.0 m/s) | Chantel Malone (IVB) | 6.10m (−1.1 m/s) | Rochelle Farquharson (JAM) | 5.86m (−0.5 m/s) |
| Triple jump | Yudelsy González (VEN) | 12.52m (−1.6 m/s) | Janelle McCleod (JAM) | 12.44m (−1.0 m/s) | Rochelle Farquharson (JAM) | 12.03m (−0.3 m/s) |
| Shot put | Cecilia Dzul (MEX) | 14.84m | Candicea Bernard (JAM) | 12.73m | Racquel Williams (BAH) | 12.60m |
| Discus throw | Ashlee Smith (TRI) | 47.32m | Candicea Bernard (JAM) | 46.93m | Ana González (MEX) | 45.58m |
| Hammer throw | Ana Sánchez (MEX) | 51.90m | Karla Cartagena (PUR) | 44.74m | Keyshla Luna (PUR) | 43.79m |
| Javelin throw | Betzabet Menéndez (MEX) | 48.35m | Milagros Montes (DOM) | 42.43m | Génova Arias (CRC) | 41.19m |
| Heptathlon | Ana Maria Porras (CRC) | 4534 | Milagros Montes (DOM) | 4302 | Kanishque Todman (IVB) | 3548 |
| 5000 metres race walk (exhibition) | Yanelli Caballero (MEX) | 23:22.86 | Maria Mena (MEX) | 24:32.07 | Andreina González (DOM) | 29:14.23 |
| 4 × 100 metres relay | Jamaica; Seidatha Palmer; Danielle Williams; Yanique Ellington; Diandra Gilbert | 45.03 | Bahamas; V'Alonee Robinson; Ivanique Kemp; Rashan Brown; Katrina Seymour | 45.54 | Trinidad and Tobago; Breanna Gomes; Kai Selvon; T'Keyah Dumoy; Gabriela Cumberbatch | 45.55 |
| 4 × 400 metres relay | Jamaica; Jodi-Ann Muir; Janieve Russell; Danielle Dowie; Ristananna Tracey | 3:34.41 | Trinidad and Tobago; Sparkle Mc Knight; Gabriela Cumberbatch; Kai Selvon; Alena Brooks | 3:38.49 | Bahamas; Katrina Seymour; Devinn Cartwright; Anthonique Strachan; Rashan Brown | 3:38.81 |

==== Tiebreaker in High jump ====
^{†}: Alysbeth Felix from Puerto Rico cleared 1.70m in the first attempt, while Peta-Gaye Reid from Jamaica only in the second attempt. The medal table was corrected accordingly.

=== Male Junior B (under 17) ===
| Event | Gold | | Silver | | Bronze | |
|---|---|---|---|---|---|---|
| 100 metres (−2.3 m/s) | Odean Skeen (JAM) | 10.84 | Odail Todd (JAM) | 10.97 | Jeneko Place (BER) | 11.02 |
| 200 metres (−2.1 m/s) | Odean Skeen (JAM) | 21.64 | Jeneko Place (BER) | 21.91 | Tahir Walsh (ATG) | 22.03 |
| 400 metres | Lennox Williams (JAM) | 47.94 | Machel Cedenio (TRI) | 48.12 | Jerrard Mason (BAR) | 48.13 |
| 800 metres | Jerrard Mason (BAR) | 1:53.80 | Wesley Vázquez (PUR) | 1:55.00 | Kevon Robinson (JAM) | 1:55.54 |
| 1500 metres | Wesley Vázquez (PUR) | 4:05.70 | Edgar García (MEX) | 4:05.80 | Felix Montalvo (PUR) | 4:06.78 |
| 3000 metres | Giancarlo Baez (PUR) | 9:09.62 | Osmar Pacheco (MEX) | 9:12.32 | Mark London (TRI) | 9:18.34 |
| 100 metres hurdles (−1.2 m/s) | Omar McLeod (JAM) | 13.14 | Davian Dennis (JAM) | 13.39 | Daley Carter (BAR) | 13.60 |
| 400 metres hurdles | Stephen Newbold (BAH) | 54.25 | Tramaine Maloney (BAR) | 54.51 | Dario Scantlebury (BAR) | 55.52 |
| 2000 m steeplechase (exhibition) | Giancarlo Baez (PUR) | 6:18.76 | Juan Feliz (DOM) | 6:49.77 | Orbis Hernández (DOM) | 6:58.45 |
| High jump | José González (MEX) | 1.96m | Ashani Wright (JAM) | 1.90m | Jayden Cline (IVB) | 1.85m |
| Pole vault (exhibition) | Juan Rivera (MEX) | 4.00m | | | | |
| Long jump | Javari Fairclough (JAM) | 7.17m^{‡} (−0.9 m/s) | Juan Mosquera (PAN) | 7.17m^{‡} (−0.2 m/s) | Clive Pullen (JAM) | 6.74m (−1.2 m/s) |
| Triple jump | Lathone Collie-Minns (BAH) | 15.20m CR (−1.4 m/s) | Latario Collie-Minns (BAH) | 15.05m (−0.7 m/s) | Demar Robinson (JAM) | 14.89m (−0.2 m/s) |
| Shot put | Hezekiel Romeo (TRI) | 17.46m CR | Chadrick Dacosta (JAM) | 16.98m | Kashif Ford (JAM) | 16.83m |
| Discus throw | Chadrick Dacosta (JAM) | 51.82m | Fedrick Dacres (JAM) | 47.88m | Tristan Whitehall (BAR) | 41.52m |
| Hammer throw (exhibition) | Diego del Real (MEX) | 61.27m | | | | |
| Javelin throw | Nicholia Bovelle (BAR) | 57.52m | Adrian Williams (SKN) | 57.25m | Janiel Craigg (BAR) | 56.50m |
| Octathlon | | | | | | |
| 5000 m race walk (exhibition) | | | | | | |
| 4 × 100 metres relay | Jamaica; Oshane Burrell; Odean Skeen; Odail Todd; Ramoy Booner | 40.88 | Bahamas; Delano Davis; Anthony Farrington; James Cash; Julian Munroe | 41.72 | Trinidad and Tobago; Breon Mullings; Ayodele Taffe; Jereem Richards; John-Mark Constantine | 41.98 |
| 4 × 400 metres relay | Bahamas; Michael Lockhart; Andre Wells; Ashley Riley; Stephen Newbold | 3:16.30 CR | Trinidad and Tobago; Theon Lewis; Jereem Richards; Mark London; Machel Cedenio | 3:17.54 | Jamaica; Alex Willis; Lennox Williams; Christopher Regent; Kevon Robinson | 3:18.67 |

==== Tiebreaker in Long jump ====
^{‡}: Javari Fairclough from Jamaica had the second best performance of 7.11m, while the second best jump of Juan Mosquera from Panamá was only 6.97m. The medal table was corrected accordingly.

=== Female Junior B (under 17) ===
| Event | Gold | | Silver | | Bronze | |
|---|---|---|---|---|---|---|
| 100 metres (−1.2 m/s) | Saqukine Cameron (JAM) | 12.11 | Kadisha Dallas (JAM) | 12.23 | Marvar Etienne (BAH) | 12.27 |
| 200 metres (−1.2 m/s) | Shericka Jackson (JAM) | 24.23 | Saqukine Cameron (JAM) | 24.40 | Shaunae Miller (BAH) | 24.51 |
| 400 metres | Shaunae Miller (BAH) | 53.39 CR | Chrisann Gordon (JAM) | 54.13 | Olivia James (JAM) | 55.54 |
| 800 metres | Domonique Williams (TRI) | 2:13.09 | Vanessa Philbert (AHO) | 2:13.64 | Sonia Gaskin (BAR) | 2:14.42 |
| 1200 metres | Angelin Figueroa (PUR) | 3:39.94 | Vanessa Philbert (AHO) | 3:40.03 | Carla Thompson (JAM) | 3:41.65 |
| 100 metres hurdles (-3.8 m/s) | Megan Simmonds (JAM) | 14.32 | Shakera Hall (BAR) | 14.80 | Kimone Green (JAM) | 15.06 |
| 300 metres hurdles | Kernesha Spann (TRI) | 43.22 | Shakera Hall (BAR) | 43.31 | Claudette Allen (JAM) | 43.78 |
| High jump | Catherine Nina (DOM) | 1.81m CR | Akela Jones (BAR) | 1.81m CR | Ashleigh Nalty (CAY) | 1.69m |
| Long jump | Chanice Porter (JAM) | 5.91m (0.5 m/s) | Akela Jones (BAR) | 5.74m (0.4 m/s) | Tamara Moncrieffe (JAM) | 5.54m (−1.2 m/s) |
| Triple jump | Cinthia Moreno (MEX) | 11.45m (−0.8 m/s) | Opal James (JAM) | 11.32m (−0.3 m/s) | Evilin del Carmen (DOM) | 11.18m (−0.6 m/s) |
| Shot put | Cherisse Murray (TRI) | 12.08m | Gisela Henríquez (PAN) | 11.61m | Gleneve Grange (JAM) | 11.25m |
| Discus throw | Sheena Powell (JAM) | 36.70m | Rosario Álvarez (MEX) | 34.50m | Samanthia Johnson (JAM) | 34.38m |
| Javelin throw (exhibition) | Daliadiz Ortíz (PUR) | 41.83m CR | Shanice Yankey (DMA) | 38.96m | Haydee Grijalba (CRC) | 36.33m |
| Heptathlon | Chelsey Linton (DMA) | 4504 | Andrea Vargas (CRC) | 3972 | Dannielle Gibson (BAH) | 3963 |
| 4000m race walk (exhibition) | Angelin Figueroa (PUR) | 21:51.10 | Franchesca Duran (DOM) | 28:52.14 | | |
| 4 × 100 metres relay | Jamaica; Chanice Bonner; Kadisha Dallas; Saqukine Cameron; Shericka Jackson | 45.67 | Bahamas; Devynne Charlton; Shaunae Miller; Gregria Higgs; Marvar Etienne | 46.64 | Barbados; Akela Taylor; Akela Jones; Shakera Hall; Shavonne Husbands | 46.80 |
| 4 × 400 metres relay | Jamaica; Olivia James; Shericka Jackson; Janikee Gardner; Yanique McNeil | 3:43.08 | Bahamas; Marvar Etienne; Shaunae Miller; Rachante Colebrooke; Talia Thompson | 3:51.27 | Trinidad and Tobago; Shirnelle Ettienne; Domonique Williams; Onika Murray; Kernesha Spann | 3:55.22 |

== Medal table ==
The combined medal count was published.

* Host nation (Dominican Republic)

| Rank | Nation | Gold | Silver | Bronze | Total |
|---|---|---|---|---|---|
| 1 | Jamaica^[a] | 25 | 19 | 63 | 107 |
| 2 | Mexico | 16 | 8 | 4 | 28 |
| 3 | Trinidad and Tobago | 12 | 6 | 9 | 27 |
| 4 | Puerto Rico | 9 | 9 | 4 | 22 |
| 5 | Bahamas | 4 | 7 | 9 | 20 |
| 6 | Barbados | 3 | 5 | 7 | 15 |
| 7 | Dominican Republic* | 2 | 11 | 9 | 22 |
| 8 | Venezuela | 2 | 1 | 1 | 4 |
| 9 | Bermuda | 1 | 2 | 1 | 4 |
| 10 | Netherlands Antilles | 1 | 2 | 0 | 3 |
| 11 | Costa Rica | 1 | 1 | 3 | 5 |
| 12 | British Virgin Islands | 1 | 1 | 2 | 4 |
| 13 | Dominica | 1 | 1 | 0 | 2 |
| 13 | U.S. Virgin Islands | 1 | 1 | 0 | 2 |
| 15 | Guatemala | 1 | 0 | 0 | 1 |
| 16 | Saint Kitts and Nevis | 0 | 2 | 0 | 2 |
| 17 | Panama^[b] | 0 | 0 | 2 | 2 |
| 17 | Saint Vincent and the Grenadines | 0 | 0 | 2 | 2 |
| 19 | Antigua and Barbuda | 0 | 0 | 1 | 1 |
| 19 | Cayman Islands | 0 | 0 | 1 | 1 |
| 19 | Honduras | 0 | 0 | 1 | 1 |
| Totals (21 entries) | | 80 | 76 | 119 | 275 |

Notes:

- ^[a] Corrected due to tiebreaking procedure.
- ^[b] Corrected due to tiebreaking procedure.

== Team trophies ==
Team trophies were distributed to the 1st place of the women category, to the 1st place of the men category, and to the 1st place overall (men and women categories). The results were published.

=== Overall ===
The host country is highlighted in lavender blue

| Rank | Nation | Points |
|---|---|---|
| 1st place, gold medalist(s) | Jamaica | 597 |
| 2 | Trinidad and Tobago | 337 |
| 3 | Bahamas | 256.5 |
| 4 | Dominican Republic | 246 |
| 5 | Mexico | 211 |
| 6 | Puerto Rico | 198 |
| 7 | Barbados | 188 |
| 8 | Bermuda | 67 |
| 9 | British Virgin Islands | 55 |
| 10 | Costa Rica | 50 |
| 11 | Venezuela | 39 |
| 12 | Netherlands Antilles | 38.5 |
| 13 | Panama | 29 |
| 14 | Dominica | 27 |
| 15 | Guatemala | 25 |
| 16 | Honduras | 24 |
| 16 | Saint Kitts and Nevis | 24 |
| 18 | Cayman Islands | 22.5 |
| 19 | Antigua and Barbuda | 21 |
| 19 | United States Virgin Islands | 21 |
| 21 | El Salvador | 17.5 |
| 22 | Saint Vincent and the Grenadines | 12 |
| 23 | Anguilla | 7.5 |
| 24 | Saint Lucia | 7 |
| 25 | Turks and Caicos Islands | 3.5 |
| 26 | Haiti | 3 |

=== Male ===
The host country is highlighted in lavender blue

| Rank | Nation | Points |
|---|---|---|
| 1st place, gold medalist(s) | Jamaica | 283.5 |
| 2 | Trinidad and Tobago | 201 |
| 3 | Bahamas | 138.5 |
| 4 | Puerto Rico | 136 |
| 5 | Mexico | 117.5 |
| 6 | Barbados | 116 |
| 7 | Dominican Republic | 113.5 |
| 8 | Bermuda | 42 |
| 9 | Venezuela | 29 |
| 10 | Saint Kitts and Nevis | 20 |
| 11 | Guatemala | 19 |
| 12 | Honduras | 18 |
| 13 | Antigua and Barbuda | 16 |
| 13 | Costa Rica | 16 |
| 15 | Panama | 29 |
| 16 | Saint Vincent and the Grenadines | 12 |
| 17 | Cayman Islands | 11.5 |
| 18 | British Virgin Islands | 9 |
| 18 | Dominica | 9 |
| 20 | United States Virgin Islands | 8 |
| 21 | Netherlands Antilles | 7.5 |
| 22 | El Salvador | 5.5 |
| 23 | Turks and Caicos Islands | 3.5 |
| 24 | Haiti | 3 |
| 24 | Anguilla | 3 |
| 26 | Saint Lucia | 2 |

=== Female ===
The host country is highlighted in lavender blue

| Rank | Nation | Points |
|---|---|---|
| 1st place, gold medalist(s) | Jamaica | 313.5 |
| 2 | Trinidad and Tobago | 136 |
| 3 | Dominican Republic | 132.5 |
| 4 | Bahamas | 118 |
| 5 | Mexico | 93.5 |
| 6 | Barbados | 72 |
| 7 | Puerto Rico | 62 |
| 8 | British Virgin Islands | 46 |
| 9 | Costa Rica | 34 |
| 10 | Netherlands Antilles | 31 |
| 11 | Bermuda | 25 |
| 12 | Dominica | 18 |
| 13 | Panama | 15 |
| 14 | United States Virgin Islands | 13 |
| 15 | El Salvador | 12 |
| 16 | Cayman Islands | 11 |
| 17 | Venezuela | 10 |
| 18 | Honduras | 6 |
| 18 | Guatemala | 6 |
| 20 | Antigua and Barbuda | 5 |
| 20 | Saint Lucia | 5 |
| 22 | Anguilla | 4.5 |
| 23 | Saint Kitts and Nevis | 4 |

== Participation ==
The published team roster comprise 532 athletes from 27 countries. Working through the results, an unofficial count yields the number of about 500 athletes (205 junior, 195 youth) in the start list. Following, the numbers in brackets refer to (athletes in published team roster/athletes in start list):

- Anguilla (6)
- Antigua and Barbuda (6/5)
- Bahamas (59/55)
- Barbados (27)
- Bermuda (16)
- British Virgin Islands (15)
- Cayman Islands (11)
- Costa Rica (14/13)
- Dominica (9)
- Dominican Republic (75/70)
- El Salvador (5)
- Guatemala (8)
- (Haiti) Haïti (5/3)
- Honduras (13/12)
- Jamaica (91/82)
- (Mexico) México (39/36)
- Montserrat (3)
- Netherlands Antilles (10)
- (Panama) Panamá (6)
- Puerto Rico (31)
- Saint Kitts and Nevis (11/9)
- Saint Lucia (4/3)
- Saint Vincent and the Grenadines (5)
- Trinidad and Tobago (52/49)
- Turks and Caicos Islands (3)
- U.S. Virgin Islands (3)
- Venezuela (5)
