= 2008 World Junior Championships in Athletics – Men's 100 metres =

The men's 100 metres event at the 2008 World Junior Championships in Athletics was held in Bydgoszcz, Poland, at Zawisza Stadium on 8 and 9 July.

== Medalists ==
Gold	Dexter Lee; Jamaica
Silver	Wilhelm van der Vyver; South Africa
Bronze	Terrell Wilks; United States

== Results ==
=== Final ===
9 July
Wind: -0.8 m/s

Rank	Name	Nationality	Time	Notes
1st place, gold medalist(s)	Dexter Lee	Jamaica	10.40	
2nd place, silver medalist(s)	Wilhelm van der Vyver	South Africa	10.42	
3rd place, bronze medalist(s)	Terrell Wilks	United States	10.45	
4	Yohan Blake	Jamaica	10.51	
5	Benjamin Olsson	Sweden	10.67	
6	David Lescay	Cuba	10.71	
7	Shehan Abeypitiyage	Sri Lanka	10.71	
8	Kemar Hyman	Cayman Islands	10.79	

=== Semifinals ===
8 July

==== Semifinal 1 ====
Wind: -0.6 m/s

Rank	Name	Nationality	Time	Notes
1	Terrell Wilks	United States	10.37	Q
2	Benjamin Olsson	Sweden	10.57	Q
3	David Ambler	New Zealand	10.63	
4	Lai Chun Ho	Hong Kong	10.67	
5	Ufomba Chime	Nigeria	10.73	
6	Valerio Rosichini	Italy	10.75	
7	Calvin Kang Li Loong	Singapore	10.75	
8	Aleksandr Shpaer	Russia	10.78	

==== Semifinal 2 ====
Wind: +0.3 m/s

Rank	Name	Nationality	Time	Notes
1	Wilhelm van der Vyver	South Africa	10.38	Q
2	Dexter Lee	Jamaica	10.42	Q
3	Kemar Hyman	Cayman Islands	10.57	q
4	Shehan Abeypitiyage	Sri Lanka	10.59	q
5	Václav Zich	Czech Republic	10.63	
6	Tsui Chi Ho	Hong Kong	10.74	
7	Romain Burel	France	10.82	
	Antonio Sales	United States	DQ	IAAF rule 162.7

==== Semifinal 3 ====
Wind: -0.4 m/s

Rank	Name	Nationality	Time	Notes
1	Yohan Blake	Jamaica	10.42	Q
2	David Lescay	Cuba	10.59	Q
3	Tyrone Halstead	Canada	10.65	
4	Emmanouíl Koutsouklákis	Greece	10.66	
5	Pascal Mancini	Switzerland	10.67	
6	David Walters	U.S. Virgin Islands	10.74	
7	Su Wai'bou Sanneh	Gambia	10.75	
8	Miguel López	Puerto Rico	10.75	

=== Heats ===
8 July

==== Heat 1 ====
Wind: -0.2 m/s

Rank	Name	Nationality	Time	Notes
1	Antonio Sales	United States	10.49	Q
2	Tsui Chi Ho	Hong Kong	10.67	Q
3	Bernhard Chudarek	Austria	10.70	
4	Philippos Spastris	Cyprus	10.72	
5	Philip Berntsen	Norway	10.74	
6	Izzet Safer	Turkey	10.90	
7	Ángel Miret	Andorra	11.51	
8	Jesus Iguel	Northern Mariana Islands	11.71	
9	Tim Natua	Kiribati	11.88	

==== Heat 2 ====
Wind: +1.1 m/s

Rank	Name	Nationality	Time	Notes
1	David Lescay	Cuba	10.47	Q
2	Václav Zich	Czech Republic	10.58	Q
3	Valerio Rosichini	Italy	10.63	q
4	Romain Burel	France	10.66	q
5	Roscoe Engel	South Africa	10.72	
6	Alvaro Cassiani	Venezuela	10.77	
7	Mohd Zabidi Ahmed	Malaysia	10.96	
8	Bali Ram Chaudhari	Nepal	11.72	
	Liang Tse-Ching	Chinese Taipei	DQ	IAAF rule 162.7

==== Heat 3 ====
Wind: +0.2 m/s

Rank	Name	Nationality	Time	Notes
1	Terrell Wilks	United States	10.28	Q
2	Calvin Kang Li Loong	Singapore	10.62	Q
3	Emmanouíl Koutsouklákis	Greece	10.68	q
4	Edoardo Baini	Italy	10.75	
5	Oskar Åberg	Sweden	10.88	
6	Alonso Edward	Panama	10.91	
7	Gordon Heather	Cook Islands	11.57	
8	Bryan Brown	Costa Rica	12.12	

==== Heat 4 ====
Wind: +0.1 m/s

Rank	Name	Nationality	Time	Notes
1	Benjamin Olsson	Sweden	10.58	Q
2	Pascal Mancini	Switzerland	10.58	Q
3	David Walters	U.S. Virgin Islands	10.66	q
4	Ufomba Chime	Nigeria	10.68	q
5	Kendall Bacchus	Trinidad and Tobago	10.77	
6	Martin Lamy	France	10.79	
7	Mosito Lehata	Lesotho	11.09	
8	Denvil Ruan	Anguilla	11.43	
9	Azneem Ahmed	Maldives	11.55	

==== Heat 5 ====
Wind: +0.1 m/s

Rank	Name	Nationality	Time	Notes
1	David Ambler	New Zealand	10.58	Q
2	Kemar Hyman	Cayman Islands	10.65	Q
3	Dexter Lee	Jamaica	10.65	q
4	Pavel Maslák	Czech Republic	10.75	
5	Weerawat Pharueang	Thailand	10.87	
6	Thomas Slowinski	French Polynesia	11.42	
7	Emile Nisap	Vanuatu	11.64	
	Matic Molicnik	Slovenia	DQ	IAAF rule 162.7

==== Heat 6 ====
Wind: +0.5 m/s

Rank	Name	Nationality	Time	Notes
1	Tyrone Halstead	Canada	10.60	Q
2	Lai Chun Ho	Hong Kong	10.60	Q
3	Su Yung-Chun	Chinese Taipei	10.74	
4	Semih Sencer	Turkey	10.90	
5	Thamer Nasser Thani	Qatar	11.03	
6	Bartosz Wojciechowski	Poland	11.14	
7	Sadio Diallo	Mali	11.17	
8	Alfred Adison	Solomon Islands	11.19	

==== Heat 7 ====
Wind: -0.7 m/s

Rank	Name	Nationality	Time	Notes
1	Shehan Abeypitiyage	Sri Lanka	10.68	Q
2	Aleksandr Shpaer	Russia	10.77	Q
3	Genki Kawai	Japan	10.86	
4	Artur Zaczek	Poland	10.86	
5	Tre Houston	Bermuda	10.92	
6	Silyan Georgiev	Bulgaria	10.95	
7	Courtney Williams	Saint Vincent and the Grenadines	11.19	

==== Heat 8 ====
Wind: -0.7 m/s

Rank	Name	Nationality	Time	Notes
1	Yohan Blake	Jamaica	10.56	Q
2	Miguel López	Puerto Rico	10.69	Q
3	Phillip Hayle	Canada	10.70	
4	Youssouf Mhadjou	Comoros	10.72	
5	James Alaka	United Kingdom	10.75	
6	Artyom Kravtsov	Russia	11.01	
7	Dayne O'Hara	Norfolk Island	12.03	
8	Jeffrey Tago	American Samoa	13.18	

==== Heat 9 ====
Wind: -0.7 m/s

Rank	Name	Nationality	Time	Notes
1	Wilhelm van der Vyver	South Africa	10.50	Q
2	Su Wai'bou Sanneh	Gambia	10.62	Q
3	Femi Owolade	Nigeria	10.89	
4	Yuichi Kobayashi	Japan	10.97	
5	Edi Sousa	Portugal	11.00	
6	Ahmed Al-Merjabi	Oman	11.20	
7	Kethsada Phengsawath	Laos	11.85	
8	Khiev Samnang	Cambodia	11.88	
9	Ahmed Farhad Tawabi	Afghanistan	12.39	

== Participation ==
According to an unofficial count, 75 athletes from 60 countries participated in the event.

- Afghanistan (1)
- American Samoa (1)
- Andorra (1)
- Anguilla (1)
- Austria (1)
- Bermuda (1)
- Bulgaria (1)
- Cambodia (1)
- Canada (2)
- Cayman Islands (1)
- Chinese Taipei (2)
- Comoros (1)
- Cook Islands (1)
- Costa Rica (1)
- Cuba (1)
- Cyprus (1)
- Czech Republic (2)
- France (2)
- French Polynesia (1)
- Gambia (1)
- Greece (1)
- Hong Kong (2)
- Italy (2)
- Jamaica (2)
- Japan (2)
- Kiribati (1)
- Laos (1)
- Lesotho (1)
- Malaysia (1)
- Maldives (1)
- Mali (1)
- Nepal (1)
- New Zealand (1)
- Nigeria (2)
- Norfolk Island (1)
- Northern Mariana Islands (1)
- Norway (1)
- Oman (1)
- Panama (1)
- Poland (2)
- Portugal (1)
- Puerto Rico (1)
- Qatar (1)
- Russia (2)
- Saint Vincent and the Grenadines (1)
- Singapore (1)
- Slovenia (1)
- Solomon Islands (1)
- South Africa (2)
- Sri Lanka (1)
- Sweden (2)
- Switzerland (1)
- Thailand (1)
- Trinidad and Tobago (1)
- Turkey (2)
- United Kingdom (1)
- United States (2)
- U.S. Virgin Islands (1)
- Vanuatu (1)
- Venezuela (1)
