= 2010 World Junior Championships in Athletics – Men's 100 metres =

The men's 100 metres at the 2010 World Junior Championships in Athletics was held at the Moncton 2010 Stadium on 20 & 21 July.

== Medalists ==
Gold	Silver	Bronze
Dexter Lee; Jamaica	Charles Silmon; United States	Jimmy Vicaut; France

== Records ==
Prior to the competition, the existing world junior and championship records were as follows.

World Junior Record	Darrel Brown (TRI)	10.01	Paris, France	24 August 2003
World Junior Record	Jeff Demps (USA)	10.01	Eugene, United States	28 June 2008
Championship Record	Darrel Brown (TRI)	10.09	Kingston, Jamaica	17 July 2002
World Junior Leading	Jimmy Vicaut (FRA)	10.16	Mannheim, Germany	3 July 2010
World Junior Leading	Dexter Lee (JAM)	10.16	Barcelona, Spain	9 July 2010

No new records were established during the competition.

== Results ==
=== Final ===
21 July
Wind: -0.7 m/s

Rank	Name	Nationality	Time	Notes
1st place, gold medalist(s)	Dexter Lee	Jamaica	10.21	
2nd place, silver medalist(s)	Charles Silmon	United States	10.23	Personal Best
3rd place, bronze medalist(s)	Jimmy Vicaut	France	10.28	
4	Michael Granger	United States	10.32	
5	Aaron Brown	Canada	10.48	Seasonal Best
6	Jason Rogers	Saint Kitts and Nevis	10.49	
7	Julien Watrin	Belgium	10.56	
8	Patrick Fakiye	Australia	10.62	

Key: PB = Personal best, SB = Seasonal best

=== Semifinals ===
21 July

Qual. rule: first 2 of each heat (Q) plus the 2 fastest times (q) qualified.

==== Semifinal 1 ====
Wind: +2.6 m/s

Rank	Name	Nationality	Time	Notes
1	Michael Granger	United States	10.51 w	Q
2	Jason Rogers	Saint Kitts and Nevis	10.56 w	Q
3	Julien Watrin	Belgium	10.62 w	q
4	Patrick Fakiye	Australia	10.71 w	q
5	Takumi Kuki	Japan	10.71 w	
6	Gideon Trotter	South Africa	10.76 w	
7	Shermund Allsop	Trinidad and Tobago	10.86 w	
8	Caio Cézar dos Santos	Brazil	DQ	IAAF rule 162.7

==== Semifinal 2 ====
Wind: +2.2 m/s

Rank	Name	Nationality	Time	Notes
1	Jimmy Vicaut	France	10.38 w	Q
2	Charles Silmon	United States	10.48 w	Q
3	Waide Jooste	South Africa	10.72 w	
4	Deji Tobais	United Kingdom	10.73 w	
5	Dario Horvat	Croatia	10.75 w	
6	Ryo Onabuta	Japan	10.77 w	
7	Bernardo Brady	Jamaica	10.78 w	
8	Grzegorz Zimniewicz	Poland	DQ	IAAF rule 162.7

==== Semifinal 3 ====
Wind: +0.9 m/s

Rank	Name	Nationality	Time	Notes
1	Aaron Brown	Canada	10.62	Q
2	Dexter Lee	Jamaica	10.66	Q
3	Warren Fraser	Bahamas	10.72	
4	Ayobami Oyebiyi	Nigeria	10.81	
5	Hassan Taftian	Iran	10.89	
6	Delmas Obou	Italy	10.89	
7	Sabian Cox	Trinidad and Tobago	11.00	
8	Kukyoung Kim	South Korea	11.05	

=== Heats ===
20 July

==== Heat 1 ====
Wind: +2.2 m/s

Rank	Name	Nationality	Time	Notes
1	Julien Watrin	Belgium	10.31 w	Q
2	Aaron Brown	Canada	10.37 w	Q
3	Grzegorz Zimniewicz	Poland	10.37 w	q
4	Takumi Kuki	Japan	10.46 w	q
5	Patrick Fakiye	Australia	10.50 w	q
6	Chavez Ageday	Guyana	10.87 w	
7	Ao Chan Hong	Macau	11.27 w	
8	Rodman Teltul	Palau	11.47 w	

==== Heat 2 ====
Wind: +1.3 m/s

Rank	Name	Nationality	Time	Notes
1	Dexter Lee	Jamaica	10.38	Q
2	Shermund Allsop	Trinidad and Tobago	10.64	Q
3	Delano Williams	Turks and Caicos Islands	10.75	
4	Patrick Kuhn	Germany	10.77	
5	Lawrence Ho Man Lok	Hong Kong	10.78	
6	Taron Kachatryan	Armenia	11.09	
7	Anousone Sayasenh	Laos	11.86	

==== Heat 3 ====
Wind: +0.8 m/s

Rank	Name	Nationality	Time	Notes
1	Henry Tobais	United Kingdom	10.49	Q
2	Delmas Obou	Italy	10.65	Q
3	Geno Jones	Bahamas	10.66	
4	Jirapong Meenapra	Thailand	10.70	
5	Alberto Gavaldá	Spain	10.75	
6	Mathew Sukulu	Solomon Islands	11.50	
7	Fodé Braima	Guinea-Bissau	11.81	

==== Heat 4 ====
Wind: +0.4 m/s

Rank	Name	Nationality	Time	Notes
1	Warren Fraser	Bahamas	10.46	Q
2	Kim Kuk-Young	South Korea	10.48	Q
3	Ayobani Oyebiyi	Nigeria	10.54	q
4	Ryo Onabuta	Japan	10.61	q
5	Vincent Michalet	France	10.96	
6	Kicio Welsh	Anguilla	11.67	
7	Correy Abraham	Federated States of Micronesia	11.95	

==== Heat 5 ====
Wind: +1.0 m/s

Rank	Name	Nationality	Time	Notes
1	Charles Silmon	United States	10.33	Q
2	Dario Horvat	Croatia	10.51	Q
3	Bernard Brady	Jamaica	10.52	q
4	Hassan Taftian	Iran	10.60	q
5	Florian Hübner	Germany	10.70	
6	Andrew Cavilla	Gibraltar	12.03	
7	Jamodre Lalita	Marshall Islands	12.46	

==== Heat 6 ====
Wind: +0.2 m/s

Rank	Name	Nationality	Time	Notes
1	Michael Granger	United States	10.47	Q
2	Waide Jooste	South Africa	10.60	Q
3	Dániel Karlik	Hungary	10.66	
4	Franklin Buruni	Indonesia	10.66	
5	Martin Ricar	Czech Republic	10.89	
6	Tsepo Qhotsokoane	Lesotho	10.93	
7	Dédé Manganda	Gabon	11.89	

==== Heat 7 ====
Wind: +1.3 m/s

Rank	Name	Nationality	Time	Notes
1	Gideon Trotter	South Africa	10.52	Q
2	Sabian Cox	Trinidad and Tobago	10.67	Q
3	Artur Szczesniak	Poland	10.70	
4	Emmanuel Mtimbe-Titi	Cameroon	10.73	
5	Yigitcan Hekimoglu	Turkey	10.82	
6	Lester Ryan	Montserrat	10.84	
7	Weerawat Pharueang	Thailand	10.87	

==== Heat 8 ====
Wind: +1.3 m/s

Rank	Name	Nationality	Time	Notes
1	Jimmy Vicaut	France	10.53	Q
2	Jason Rogers	Saint Kitts and Nevis	10.54	Q
3	Caio Cézar dos Santos	Brazil	10.62	q
4	Édgar Hernández	Puerto Rico	10.70	
5	Adrián Pérez	Spain	10.81	
6	Matteo Mosconi	San Marino	12.24	
7	Bukitaua Tiire Tebau	Kiribati	12.43	

== Participation ==
According to an unofficial count, 57 athletes from 46 countries participated in the event.

- Anguilla (1)
- Armenia (1)
- Australia (1)
- Bahamas (2)
- Belgium (1)
- Brazil (1)
- Cameroon (1)
- Canada (1)
- Croatia (1)
- Czech Republic (1)
- France (2)
- Gabon (1)
- Germany (2)
- Gibraltar (1)
- Guinea-Bissau (1)
- Guyana (1)
- Hong Kong (1)
- Hungary (1)
- Indonesia (1)
- Iran (1)
- Italy (1)
- Jamaica (2)
- Japan (2)
- Kiribati (1)
- Laos (1)
- Lesotho (1)
- Macau (1)
- Marshall Islands (1)
- Federated States of Micronesia (1)
- Montserrat (1)
- Nigeria (1)
- Palau (1)
- Poland (2)
- Puerto Rico (1)
- Saint Kitts and Nevis (1)
- San Marino (1)
- Solomon Islands (1)
- South Africa (2)
- South Korea (1)
- Spain (2)
- Thailand (2)
- Trinidad and Tobago (2)
- Turkey (1)
- Turks and Caicos Islands (1)
- United Kingdom (1)
- United States (2)
