= Charles Silmon =

American sprinter (born 1991)

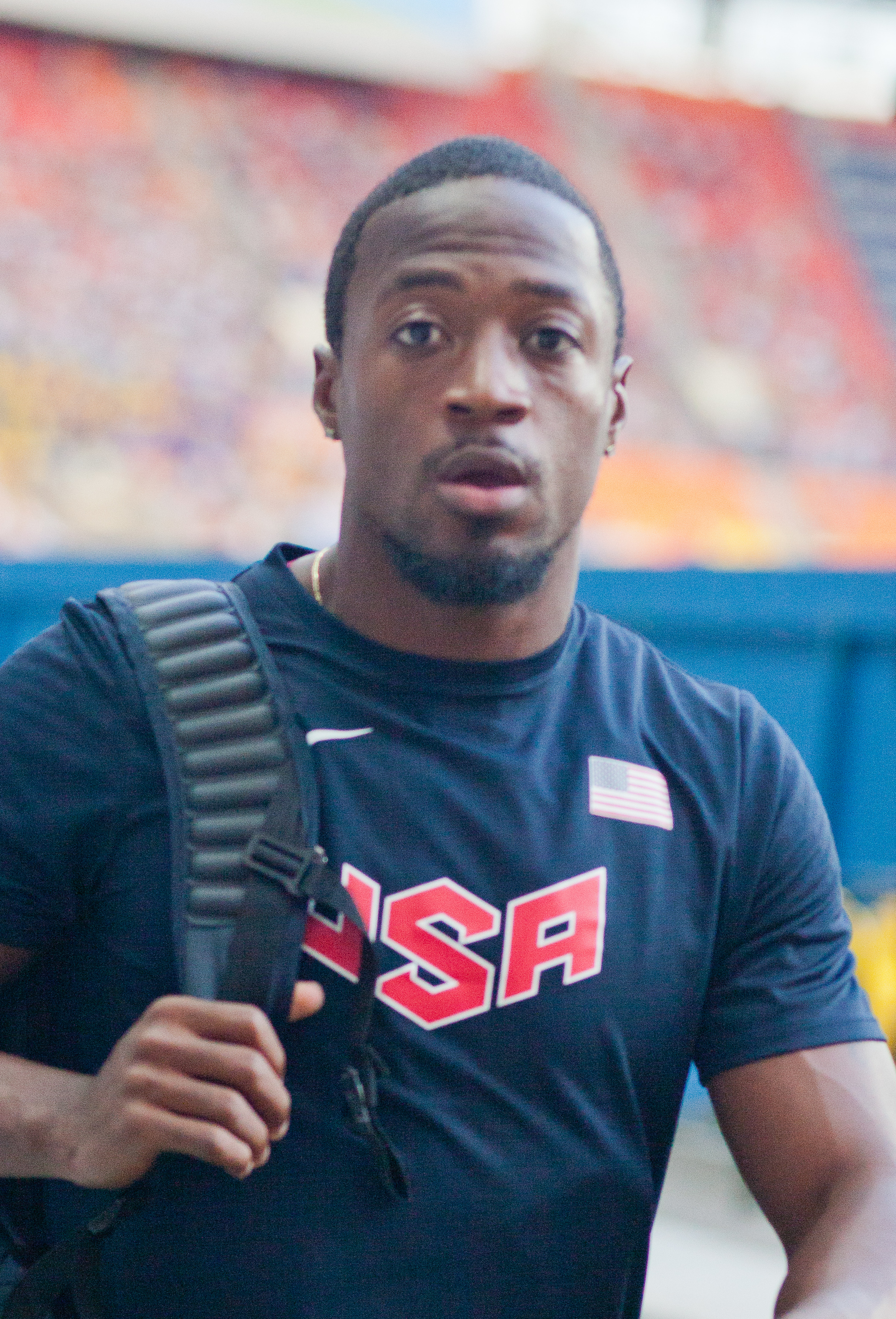
- Silmon at 2013 World Championships

Personal information
- Nationality: American
- Born: July 4, 1991 (age 34) Waco, Texas, US
- Height: 5 ft 8 in (173 cm)

Sport
- Sport: Running
- Event(s): 100 metres, 200 metres

Achievements and titles
- Personal best(s): 100 m: 9.98 s (Des Moines 2013); 200 m: 20.23 s (Austin)
Medal record
Men's athletics
Representing the United States
World Championships
Silver medal – second place	2013 Moscow	4×100 m relay
World Junior Championships
Gold medal – first place	2010 Moncton	4×100 m relay
Silver medal – second place	2010 Moncton	100 m

Charles Silmon (born July 4, 1991) is an American sprinter who specialises in the 100 and 200 metres. He won a two medals (one gold, one silver) at the 2010 World Junior Championships in Athletics. A native of Waco, Texas, Silmon attended Texas Christian University.

== Career ==
Running for Waco High School, Silmon won the Texas University Interscholastic League championships in the 100 meters his senior year.

Silmon was an NCAA champion sprinter for the TCU Horned Frogs track and field team, winning the 100 meters at the 2013 NCAA Division I Outdoor Track and Field Championships. He also qualified for the 2012 United States Olympic trials in the 100 m.

At the 2010 World Junior Championships in Athletics, Silmon won a silver medal in the 100 metres, finishing behind Dexter Lee in a personal best time of 10.23 s. Silmon then combined with Mike Granger, Eric Harris, and Oliver Bradwell in the 4×100 metres relay to finish first ahead of Jamaica and Trinidad and Tobago. On June 7, 2013, Silmon became the NCAA 100m Champion, clocking in a wind-aided 9.89 seconds. The time tied the meet record under all conditions, though the wind (3.2 meters/second) disqualified it as an NCAA record. On the 21st June 2013, Silmon clocked 9.98 in the 100m at the US World Trials. He will be competing at the World Championships at Moscow in August.

== Personal life ==
Silmon is from Waco, Texas where he attended Waco High School. He originally played gridiron football but tore his ACL twice, requiring two surgeries. Silmon majored in history at Texas Christian University with interest in U.S. history and the American Civil War.

== Personal bests ==
Event	Time	Wind	Venue	Date
100 m	9.98 s	1.1 m/s	Des Moines, Iowa	June 21, 2013
200 m	20.23 s	0.6 m/s	Austin, Texas	May 25, 2013
