= Oluwasegun Makinde =

Canadian sprinter

Personal information
- National team: Canada
- Born: 6 July 1991 (age 35) Maiduguri, Nigeria
- Education: University of Ottawa
- Height: 179 cm (5 ft 10 in)
- Weight: 81 kg (179 lb)

Sport
- Sport: Athletics
- Event: 4x100m relay

Oluwasegun Makinde (born 6 July 1991) is a Nigeria-born Canadian athlete competing in sprinting events.

Born in Maiduguri, Nigeria, Makinde moved with his family to Canada in 1992. He was an unused relay member at the 2012 Summer Olympics in London. He won the gold medal in the 200 metres at the 2013 Jeux de la Francophonie. In July 2016, he was named to Canada's Olympic team. He went to the 2018 Commonwealth Games with the Canadian team.

As of 2019, he was on the board of Athletics Canada.

== Competition record ==
Year	Competition	Venue	Position	Event	Notes
Representing Canada
2007	World Youth Championships	Ostrava, Czech Republic	22nd (sf)	200 m	22.70
2010	World Junior Championships	Moncton, New Brunswick, Canada	12th (sf)	200m	21.13 w (+2.3 m/s)
2010	World Junior Championships	Moncton, New Brunswick, Canada	15th (sf)	110m hurdles	14.05 (+0.4 m/s)
2010	World Junior Championships	Moncton, New Brunswick, Canada	12th (h)	4 × 100 m relay	40.38
2011	Universiade	Shenzhen, China	5th	200 m	20.83
2013	Universiade	Kazan, Russia	4th	200 m	20.61
2013	Universiade	Kazan, Russia	2nd (h)	4 × 100 m relay	39.64
2013	Jeux de la Francophonie	Nice, France	1st	200 m	20.80
2013	Jeux de la Francophonie	Nice, France	1st	4 × 100 m relay	39.14
2015	NACAC Championships	San José, Costa Rica	4th (sf)	200m	20.81 (+0.8 m/s)
2015	NACAC Championships	San José, Costa Rica	7th	4 × 100 m relay	39.30
2017	Universiade	Taipei, Taiwan	25th (h)	100 m	10.58
2017	Universiade	Taipei, Taiwan	10th (h)	4 × 100 m relay	40.01
2018	Commonwealth Games	Gold Coast, Australia	36th (h)	100 m	10.59
2018	Commonwealth Games	Gold Coast, Australia	–	4 × 100 m relay	DQ

== Personal best ==
- 100 metres – 10.24 (+1.4) (Toronto CAN, 11 June 2016)
- 200 metres – 20.51 (+1.7) (Lynchburg USA, 1 May 2014)
