= Takumi Kuki =

Japanese sprinter (born 1992)

Personal information
- Nationality: Japan
- Born: 18 May 1992 (age 34) Arida, Wakayama, Japan
- Height: 1.70 m (5 ft 7 in)
- Weight: 64 kg (141 lb)

Sport
- Sport: Running
- Event: Sprints
- University team: Waseda University
- Club: NTN Track and Field Club

Achievements and titles
- Personal bests: 100 m: 10.19 (Tokyo 2013); 60 m: 6.72 (Osaka 2011)
Medal record
Men's athletics
Representing Japan
East Asian Games
Silver medal – second place	2009 Hong Kong	4×100 m relay
World Youth Championships
Bronze medal – third place	2009 Brixen	Medley relay

Takumi Kuki (九鬼 巧, Kuki Takumi; born 18 May 1992) is a Japanese sprinter who specializes in the 100 metres.

He won the bronze medal in the Medley relay at the 2009 World Youth Championships in Athletics.

== Personal bests ==
Event	Time	Wind	Venue	Date
Outdoor
100 m	10.19 s	+0.3 m/s	Tokyo, Japan	6 September 2013
Indoor
60 m	6.72 s		Osaka, Japan	5 February 2011

== International competition record ==
Year	Competition	Venue	Position	Event	Notes
2009	World Youth Championships	Brixen, Italy	6th	100 m	10.88 (-1.2 m/s)
2009	World Youth Championships	Brixen, Italy	3rd	Medley relay	1:52.82 (1st leg)
2009	East Asian Games	Hong Kong, China	2nd	4 × 100 m relay	39.40 (1st leg)
2010	World Junior Championships	Moncton, Canada	9th (sf)	100 m	10.71
2010	World Junior Championships	Moncton, Canada	4th	4 × 100 m relay	39.89 (1st leg)
2017	Asian Championships	Bhubaneswar, India	12th (sf)	100 m	10.54 (wind: +1.4 m/s)
