= Mike Granger =

American sprinter (born 1991)

Personal information
- Nationality: American
- Born: March 17, 1991 (age 35) Hickory, Mississippi, U.S.

Sport
- Sport: Running
- Events: 100 metres, 200 metres

Achievements and titles
- Personal best: 100 m: 10.19 (Oxford 2012)
Medal record
Men's athletics
Representing the United States
World Junior Championships
Gold medal – first place	2010 Moncton	4×100 m relay

Michael Granger (born March 17, 1991) is an American sprinter who specialises in the 100 and 200 metres. He studied at the University of Mississippi. Granger finished fourth in the 100 metres at the 2010 World Junior Championships, behind Dexter Lee, Charles Silmon, and Jimmy Vicaut. Teaming up with Silmon, Eric Harris and Oliver Bradwell in the 4 x 100 metres relay, Granger helped the U.S. to a winning time of 38.93 sec, which was the second-fastest ever at the World Junior Championships (behind the 38.66 s WJR ran by the 2004 U.S. squad). Granger is the second Ole Miss athlete ever to win a gold medal at the World Junior Championships, following Antwon Hicks' 110-meter hurdles title in 2002.

== Personal best ==
Distance	Time	venue
100 m	10.19 s	Oxford, Mississippi, USA (31 March 2012)
