= Yuichi Kobayashi =

Japanese sprinter

Personal information
- Nationality: Japanese
- Born: 25 August 1989 (age 37) Itabashi, Tokyo, Japan
- Education: Hosei University
- Height: 1.72 m (5 ft 8 in)
- Weight: 60 kg (130 lb)

Sport
- Country: Japan
- Sport: Track and field
- Events: 100 metres 200 metres
- Club: NTN

Achievements and titles
- Personal bests: 100 m: 10.38 (2016); 200 m: 20.46 (2013)
Medal record
Men's athletics
Representing Japan
Asian Championships
Silver medal – second place	2013 Pune	4×100 m relay

Yuichi Kobayashi (小林 雄一, Kobayashi Yūichi; born 25 August 1989 in Itabashi, Tokyo) is a Japanese track and field sprinter who specialises in the 200 metres. He represented his country at two consecutive World Championships, in 2011 and 2013.

His mother Sumiko Kobayashi (née Kaibara) is a gold medalist in the 200 metres and 4 × 100 metres relay at the 1979 Asian Championships in Tokyo. She was also the former Japanese record holder in the 200 metres with a time of 24.27 seconds.

== Personal bests ==
Event	Time (s)	Competition	Venue	Date	Notes
100 m	10.38 (wind: +1.5 m/s)	Niigata Corporate Championships	Niigata, Japan	22 May 2016	
100 m	10.33 (wind: +3.0 m/s)	Tokyo Six University Meet	Tokyo, Japan	5 April 2009	Wind-assisted
200 m	20.46 (wind: +0.9 m/s)	National Championships	Chōfu, Japan	9 June 2013	

== International competition ==
Year	Competition	Venue	Position	Event	Time	Notes
Representing Japan
2006	Asian Junior Championships	Macau, China	7th	200 m	22.07 (wind: -0.9 m/s)	
2008	World Junior Championships	Bydgoszcz, Poland	49th (h)	100 m	10.97 (wind: -0.7 m/s)	
2008	World Junior Championships	Bydgoszcz, Poland	4th	4×100 m relay	39.89 (relay leg: 4th)	SB
2011	Asian Championships	Kobe, Hyogo	20th (h)	200 m	32.11 (wind: +2.1 m/s)	
2011	Asian Championships	Kobe, Hyogo	1st (h) (Note: Did not compete in the final where Japan won the gold medal)	4×100 m relay	38.92 (relay leg: 1st)	
2011	World Championships	Daegu, South Korea	46th (h)	200 m	21.27 (wind: -1.1 m/s)	
2011	World Championships	Daegu, South Korea	9th (h)	4×100 m relay	38.66 (relay leg: 1st)	SB
2013	Asian Championships	Pune, India	5th	200 m	21.02 (wind: +0.7 m/s)	
2013	Asian Championships	Pune, India	2nd	4×100 m relay	39.11 (relay leg: 1st)	
2013	World Championships	Moscow, Russia	34th (h)	200 m	20.97 (wind: +0.2 m/s)	
2014	World Relays	Nassau, Bahamas	9th (h)	4×200 m relay	1:23.87 (relay leg: 1st)	SB

== National titles ==
Year	Competition	Venue	Event	Time	Notes
Representing Hozen High School and Tokyo (National Sports Festival only)
2007	National High School Championships	Saga, Saga	100 m	10.56 (wind: +0.7 m/s)	
2007	National High School Championships	Saga, Saga	200 m	21.98 (wind: -4.3 m/s)	
2007	National Sports Festival	Akita, Akita	100 m (U19)	10.35 (wind: +4.1 m/s)	
2007	National Sports Festival	Akita, Akita	4×100 m relay	40.51 (relay leg: 4th)	
2007	National Junior Championships	Oita, Oita	200 m	21.27 (wind: -0.5 m/s)	
Representing Hosei University
2010	National University Championships	Shinjuku, Tokyo	200 m	20.52 (wind: +3.8 m/s)	
2011	National University Individual Championships	Hiratsuka, kanagawa	200 m	20.90 (wind: +0.8 m/s)	
