= Weerawat Pharueang =

Thai sprinter (born 1991)

Weerawat Pharueang (born 11 March 1991) is a retired Thai sprinter who specialized in the 100 metres.

Individually he competed at the 2007 World Youth Championships (200 m), the 2008 World Junior Championships (100 m), and the 2010 World Junior Championships (100 m) without reaching the final.

In the 4 × 100 metres relay he finished eighth at the 2008 World Junior Championships, won a silver medal at the 2008 Asian Junior Championships, gold medal at the 2010 Asian Junior Championships, finished sixth at the 2010 World Junior Championships, and were disqualified in the final at the 2011 Summer Universiade. He also competed at the 2011 World Championships without reaching the final.

His personal best time was 10.61 seconds, achieved in December 2012 in Vientiane.
