= Aliaksandr Linnik =

Belarusian sprinter (born 1991)

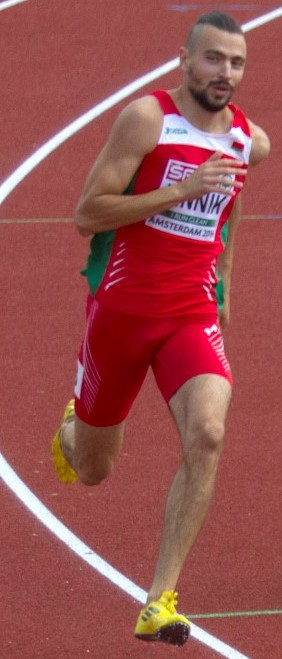
- Aliaksandr Linnik in 2016

Personal information
- Nationality: Belarus
- Born: 28 January 1991 (age 35)

Sport
- Sport: Running
- Event(s): 100 metres, 200 metres

Achievements and titles
- Personal best(s): 100 m: 10.42 s (Grodno 2010) 200 m: 20.81 s (Moncton 2010) 110 m h: 13.41 s (Novi Sad 2009)
Medal record
Representing Belarus
Men's athletics
World Junior Championships
| Silver medal – second place | 2010 Moncton | 200 m |
European Junior Championships
| Bronze medal – third place | 2009 Novi Sad | 110 m hurdles |

Aliaksandr Linnik (Belarusian: Аляксандар Ліньнік; born 28 January 1991) is a Belarusian sprinter who specialises in the 100 and 200 metres, as well as 110 metres hurdles.

At the 2009 European Athletics Junior Championships in Novi Sad, Serbia, he won a bronze medal over 110 m hurdles, establishing a new Belarusian record with 13.41 seconds in the semis.

== Personal best ==
| Distance | Time | venue |
|---|---|---|
| 100 m | 10.42 s | Grodno (26 Juni 2010) |
| 200 m | 20.81 s | Moncton (22 July 2010) |
| 110 m hurdles | 13.41 s | Novi Sad (25 July 2009) |
