= Odean Skeen =

Jamaican sprinter (born 1994)

Personal information
- Nationality: Jamaica
- Born: 28 August 1994 (age 31) Saint Andrew Parish, Jamaica
- Height: 1.73 m (5 ft 8 in)
- Weight: 67 kg (148 lb)

Sport
- Sport: Running
- Event: Sprints

Achievements and titles
- Personal bests: 100 m: 9.98 (Auburn 2017); 200 m: 20.84 (George Town 2010)
Medal record
Men's athletics
Representing Jamaica
World Junior Championships
Silver medal – second place	2010 Moncton	4×100 m relay
Silver medal – second place	2012 Barcelona	4×100 m relay
Bronze medal – third place	2012 Barcelona	100 m
Youth Olympic Games
Gold medal – first place	2010 Singapore	100 m
Gold medal – first place	2010 Singapore	Medley relay
CAC Youth Championships
Gold medal – first place	2010 Santo Domingo	100 m
Gold medal – first place	2010 Santo Domingo	200 m
Gold medal – first place	2010 Santo Domingo	4×100 m relay
CARIFTA Games (Youth)
Gold medal – first place	2009 Vieux Fort	4×100 m relay
Gold medal – first place	2010 George Town	100 m
Gold medal – first place	2010 George Town	200 m
Gold medal – first place	2010 George Town	4×100 m relay

Odean Skeen (born 28 August 1994) is a Jamaican sprinter.

== Career ==
At the inaugural 2010 Summer Youth Olympics in Singapore, Skeen won the 100 metres in his then-personal best of 10.42 seconds, ahead of Masaki Nashimoto and David Bolarinwa. On 21 April 2017, while competing for Auburn University at the War Eagle Invitational in Auburn, Alabama, Skeen set a new personal best of 9.98, becoming the 15th Jamaican to break the 10-second barrier.

== Achievements ==
Year	Competition	Venue	Position	Event	Notes
Representing Jamaica
2009	CARIFTA Games (U-17)	Vieux Fort, Saint Lucia	1st	4 × 100 m relay	40.76 CR
2010	CARIFTA Games (U-17)	George Town, Cayman Islands	1st	100 m	10.53 (0.6 m/s)
2010	CARIFTA Games (U-17)	George Town, Cayman Islands	1st	200 m	20.84 CR (1.2 m/s)
2010	CARIFTA Games (U-17)	George Town, Cayman Islands	1st	4 × 100 m relay	41.62
2010	Central American and Caribbean Junior Championships (U-17)	Santo Domingo, Dominican Republic	1st	100 m	10.84 (-2.3 m/s)
2010	Central American and Caribbean Junior Championships (U-17)	Santo Domingo, Dominican Republic	1st	200 m	21.64 (-2.1 m/s)
2010	Central American and Caribbean Junior Championships (U-17)	Santo Domingo, Dominican Republic	1st	4×100 m relay	40.88
2010	World Junior Championships	Moncton, New Brunswick, Canada	2nd	4 × 100 m relay	39.55
