= 2013 Asian Athletics Championships – Men's 200 metres =

The men's 200 metres event at the 2013 Asian Athletics Championships was held at the Shree Shiv Chhatrapati Sports Complex on 5–6 July.

== Medalists ==
| Gold | Silver | Bronze |
|---|---|---|
| Xie Zhenye; China | Fahad Al-Subaie; Saudi Arabia | Kei Takase; Japan |

== Results ==
=== Heats ===
First 3 in each heat (Q) and 4 best performers (q) advanced to the semifinals.

Wind: Heat 1: -0.4 m/s, Heat 2: -0.6 m/s, Heat 3: +1.1 m/s, Heat 4: -0.4 m/s

| Rank | Heat | Name | Nationality | Time | Notes |
|---|---|---|---|---|---|
| 1 | 3 | Fahad Al-Subaie | Saudi Arabia | 20.89 | Q |
| 2 | 3 | Xie Zhenye | China | 21.05 | Q |
| 3 | 4 | Samuel Francis | Qatar | 21.13 | Q |
| 4 | 4 | Reza Ghasemi | Iran | 21.15 | Q |
| 5 | 2 | Kei Takase | Japan | 21.26 | Q |
| 6 | 1 | Yuichi Kobayashi | Japan | 21.37 | Q |
| 7 | 4 | Hassan Saaid | Maldives | 21.49 | Q |
| 8 | 2 | Lo Yen-Yao | Chinese Taipei | 21.58 | Q |
| 9 | 4 | Pratik Ninawe | India | 21.59 | q |
| 10 | 4 | Liaquat Ali | Pakistan | 21.60 | q |
| 11 | 3 | Chan Yan Lam | Hong Kong | 21.64 | Q |
| 12 | 1 | Amiya Mallick | India | 21.77 | Q |
| 13 | 4 | Aleksandr Pronzhenko | Tajikistan | 21.95 | q |
| 14 | 1 | Ali Hassan Al-Jassim | Qatar | 22.06 | Q |
| 15 | 2 | Leung Ki Ho | Hong Kong | 22.12 | Q |
| 16 | 2 | Pin Wanheab | Cambodia | 22.22 | q |
| 17 | 2 | Ritesh Anand | India | 22.24 | |
| 18 | 2 | Azneem Ahmed | Maldives | 22.30 | |
| 19 | 4 | Mesbah Ahmmed | Bangladesh | 22.35 | |
| 20 | 2 | Tilak Ram Tharu | Nepal | 22.50 | |
| 21 | 3 | Khalifa Ibrahim | United Arab Emirates | 22.61 | |
| 22 | 3 | Lam Kin Hang | Macau | 22.77 | |
| 23 | 1 | Mohammad Abu Rayhan Musafa | Bangladesh | 22.86 | |
| 24 | 3 | Salim Saleh Al-Hekr | Yemen | 23.23 | |
| 25 | 1 | Chan Kin Fong | Macau | 23.38 | |
| 26 | 1 | Sundui Munkhsaikhan | Mongolia | 23.61 | |
| 27 | 2 | Myagmar Davaakhuu | Mongolia | 23.73 | |
| 28 | 1 | Cho Kyu-won | South Korea | 31.98 | |
| | 1 | Mohamed Salman | Bahrain | DQ | FS |
| | 3 | Ali Al-Doseri | Bahrain | DQ | |
| | 3 | Hassan Taftian | Iran | DNS | |

=== Semi-finals ===
First 3 in each heat (Q) and 2 best performers (q) advanced to the final.

Wind: Heat 1: -0.3 m/s, Heat 2: -0.1 m/s

| Rank | Heat | Name | Nationality | Time | Notes |
|---|---|---|---|---|---|
| 1 | 1 | Fahad Al-Subaie | Saudi Arabia | 20.78 | Q |
| 2 | 1 | Xie Zhenye | China | 20.88 | Q |
| 3 | 2 | Kei Takase | Japan | 20.89 | Q |
| 4 | 2 | Reza Ghasemi | Iran | 20.93 | Q |
| 5 | 2 | Samuel Francis | Qatar | 21.02 | Q |
| 6 | 1 | Yuichi Kobayashi | Japan | 21.04 | Q |
| 7 | 2 | Liaquat Ali | Pakistan | 21.24 | q |
| 8 | 2 | Lo Yen-Yao | Chinese Taipei | 21.25 | q |
| 9 | 1 | Hassan Saaid | Maldives | 21.37 | NR |
| 10 | 1 | Amiya Mallick | India | 21.67 | |
| 11 | 2 | Pratik Ninawe | India | 21.72 | |
| 12 | 1 | Leung Ki Ho | Hong Kong | 21.84 | |
| 13 | 2 | Aleksandr Pronzhenko | Tajikistan | 21.89 | |
| 14 | 1 | Pin Wanheab | Cambodia | 22.03 | |
| 15 | 1 | Ali Hassan Al-Jassim | Qatar | 22.04 | |
| 16 | 2 | Chan Yan Lam | Hong Kong | 23.58 | |

=== Final ===
Wind: +0.7 m/s

| Rank | Name | Nationality | Time | Notes |
|---|---|---|---|---|
| 1st place, gold medalist(s) | Xie Zhenye | China | 20.87 | |
| 2nd place, silver medalist(s) | Fahad Al-Subaie | Saudi Arabia | 20.912 | |
| 3rd place, bronze medalist(s) | Kei Takase | Japan | 20.918 | |
| 4 | Reza Ghasemi | Iran | 20.98 | |
| 5 | Yuichi Kobayashi | Japan | 21.02 | |
| 6 | Lo Yen-Yao | Chinese Taipei | 21.39 | |
| 7 | Liaquat Ali | Pakistan | 21.41 | |
| | Samuel Francis | Qatar | DNS | |
