= Andre Wells =

Bahamian sprinter

Personal information
- Nationality: Bahamas
- Born: 9 November 1994 (age 31)

Sport
- Sport: Running
- Events: 200 metres, 400 metres
- College team: Florida State Seminoles

Achievements and titles
- Personal best: 400 m: 46.87 s (Freeport 2011)
Medal record
Men's athletics
Representing the Bahamas
Pan American Junior Championships
Bronze medal – third place	2011 Miramar	4×400 m relay
CAC Junior Championships (Youth)
Gold medal – first place	2010 Santo Domingo	4×400 m relay
CARIFTA Games (Youth)
Silver medal – second place	2010 George Town	4×400 m relay

Andre Wells (born 9 November 1994) is a Bahamian sprinter. He attended Florida State University.

He won a gold medal in the 4×400 metre relay at the 2010 Central American and Caribbean Junior Championships.
