= Kei Takase =

Japanese sprinter

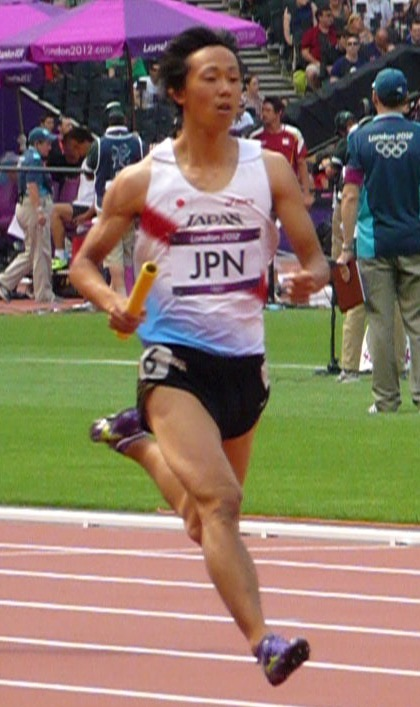
- Takase at 2012 Olympics

Personal information
- Born: 25 November 1988 (age 37) Shizuoka, Japan
- Height: 1.79 m (5 ft 10 in)
- Weight: 67 kg (148 lb)

Sport
- Country: Japan
- Sport: Athletics
- Event(s): 100 metres 200 metres

Achievements and titles
- Personal best(s): 100 metres 10.09 (-0.1 m/s) (Kawasaki 2015); 200 metres 20.14 (+1.0 m/s) (Kumagaya 2015)

Kei Takase (髙瀬 慧, Takase Kei; born 25 November 1988 in Shizuoka) is a Japanese sprinter. He competed in 200 metres at the 2012 Summer Olympics in London, and was part of the Japanese 4 × 400 m team. He also competed in the 2013 World Championships in Athletics, held in Moscow. More recently he took part in 100 metres races in various meetings, clocking 10.09 into a slight headwind in Kawasaki in May 2015, performing well enough to represent Japan in the 100 m at the 2015 World Championships as well as in the 200 m. He competed at the 2016 Olympics in the 200 m, only.

== International competitions ==
Year	Competition	Venue	Position	Event	Notes
Representing Japan
2011	Asian Championships	Kobe, Japan	1st	4 × 400 m relay	3:04.72
2011	World Championships	Daegu, South Korea	13th (h)	4 × 400 m relay	3:02.64
2012	Olympic Games	London, United Kingdom	18th (sf)	200 m	20.70
2012	Olympic Games	London, United Kingdom	12th (h)	4 × 400 m relay	3:03.86
2013	Asian Championships	Pune, India	3rd	200 m	20.92
2013	Asian Championships	Pune, India	2nd	4 × 100 m relay	39.11
2013	World Championships	Moscow, Russia	33rd (h)	200 m	20.96
2013	World Championships	Moscow, Russia	6th	4 × 100 m relay	38.39
2014	IAAF World Relays	Nassau, Bahamas	5th	4 × 100 m relay	38.40
2014	Asian Games	Incheon, South Korea	3rd	100 m	10.15
2014	Asian Games	Incheon, South Korea	2nd	4 × 100 m relay	38.49
2015	World Championships	Beijing, China	25th (h)	100 m	10.15
2015	World Championships	Beijing, China	24th (sf)	200 m	20.64
2016	Olympic Games	Rio de Janeiro, Brazil	55th (h)	200 m	20.71

== Personal bests ==
Outdoor

- 100 metres – 10.09 (-0.1 m/s, Kawasaki 2015)
- 200 metres – 20.14 (+1.0 m/s, Kumagaya 2015)
