= Moriba Morain =

Trinidad and Tobago sprinter

Personal information
- Nationality: Trinidad and Tobago
- Born: 8 October 1992 (age 33)
- Education: Wiley College
- Height: 1.83 m (6 ft 0 in)
- Weight: 76 kg (168 lb)

Sport
- Sport: Track and field
- Event(s): 100 metres, 200 metres
- College team: Wiley Wildcats

Achievements and titles
- Personal best(s): 100 m: 10.33 s (2010); 200 m: 20.85 s (2011)
Medal record
Men's athletics
Representing Trinidad and Tobago
World Junior Championships
Bronze medal – third place	2010 Moncton	4×100 m relay
- Updated on 28 January 2015

Moriba Joseph Morain (born 8 October 1992) is a Trinidadian sprinter.

He won a gold medal in the 200 metres at the 2010 Central American and Caribbean Junior Championships in Santo Domingo.

In 2011, Morain finished second behind Rondel Sorrillo in the 200 metres at the Sagicor National Open Track and Field Championship.

== Personal bests ==
Event	Result	Venue	Date
100 m	10.22 s (wind: +1.7 m/s)	Port of Spain, Trinidad and Tobago	27 May 2012
200 m	20.77 s (wind: +0.6 m/s)	Port of Spain, Trinidad and Tobago	19 May 2012

== Competition record ==
Year	Competition	Venue	Position	Event	Notes
Representing Trinidad and Tobago
2008	CARIFTA Games (U17)	Basseterre, Saint Kitts and Nevis	2nd	100 m	10.84 (wind: -1.6 m/s)
2008	CARIFTA Games (U17)	Basseterre, Saint Kitts and Nevis	2nd	200 m	21.74 (wind: +2.0 m/s)
2008	CARIFTA Games (U17)	Basseterre, Saint Kitts and Nevis	2nd	4 × 100 m relay	42.29
2009	CARIFTA Games (U20)	Vieux Fort, Saint Lucia	5th	200m	21.40 w (wind: +2.3 m/s)
2009	CARIFTA Games (U20)	Vieux Fort, Saint Lucia	2nd (h)^{1}	4 × 100 m relay	40.46^{1}
2009	World Youth Championship	Bressanone, Italy	8th	100m	10.94 (wind: -1.2 m/s)
2009	World Youth Championship	Bressanone, Italy	8th (sf)	200 m	21.56 (wind: +1.4 m/s)
2009	World Youth Championship	Bressanone, Italy	5th	800m Medley relay	1:53.51
2009	Pan American Junior Championships	Port of Spain, Trinidad and Tobago	4th	4 × 100 m relay	40.33
2010	Central American and Caribbean Junior Championships (U20)	Santo Domingo, Dominican Republic	—	100 m	DQ
2010	Central American and Caribbean Junior Championships (U20)	Santo Domingo, Dominican Republic	1st	200 m	21.26 (wind: -2.4 m/s)
2010	Central American and Caribbean Junior Championships (U20)	Santo Domingo, Dominican Republic	1st	4 × 100 m relay	39.77
2010	World Junior Championships	Moncton, Canada	6th	200 m	21.10 (wind: +0.5 m/s)
2010	World Junior Championships	Moncton, Canada	3rd	4 × 100 m relay	39.72
2011	CARIFTA Games (U20)	Montego Bay, Jamaica	2nd	200m	21.05 (wind: -1.1 m/s)
2011	CARIFTA Games (U20)	Montego Bay, Jamaica	2nd	4 × 100 m relay	39.91
2011	Pan American Junior Championships	Miramar, United States	4th	200m	21.15 w (wind: +2.2 m/s)
2011	Pan American Junior Championships	Miramar, United States	2nd	4 × 400 m relay	3:13.27
2011	Pan American Games	Guadalajara, Mexico	18th (sf)	200 m	20.91 (wind: +0.2 m/s) A
2011	Pan American Games	Guadalajara, Mexico	—	4 × 100 m relay	DNF
2012	NACAC Under-23 Championships	Irapuato, Mexico	12th (h)	200 m	21.64 (wind: -0.9 m/s)
2014	NACAC Under-23 Championships	Kamloops, Canada	10th (h)	100 m	10.57 w (wind: +2.4 m/s)
2017	IAAF World Relays	Nassau, Bahamas	1st (B)	4 × 100 m relay	39.04
2017	IAAF World Relays	Nassau, Bahamas	4th	4 × 200 m relay	1:21.39
2017	World Championships	London, United Kingdom	9th (h)	4 × 100 m relay	38.61
2017	Universiade	Taipei, Taiwan	5th (h)	100 m	10.34^{2}
2017	Universiade	Taipei, Taiwan	11th (h)	4 × 100 m relay	40.13

^{1}Disqualified in the final
^{2}Did not finish in the quarterfinals
