= David Adley Smith II =

Puerto Rican track and field Olympic athlete

David Smith
Personal information
- Full name: David Adley Smith II
- Nationality: Puerto Rican
- Born: May 2, 1992 (age 34) United States
- Height: 6 ft 4 in (193 cm)
- Weight: 181 lb (82 kg)

Sport
- Country: Puerto Rico
- Sport: Athletics
- Event: High jump

Achievements and titles
- Olympic finals: 2016 Summer Olympics

David Adley Smith II (born May 2, 1992) is a Puerto Rican track and field athlete who competes in the high jump event. He competed at the 2016 Summer Olympics. In late 2017, Smith won a $2 million lawsuit for a car accident which resulted in a hip injury, leaving him unable to compete as well as he had in the past.
