= Jeneko Place =

Bermudian sprinter

Personal information
- Nationality: Bermuda
- Born: 27 January 1994 (age 32)

Sport
- Sport: Running
- Event(s): 100 metres, 200 metres

Achievements and titles
- Personal best(s): 100 m: 10.71 s (George Town 2010); 200 m: 21.27 s (George Town 2010)
Medal record
Men's athletics
Representing Bermuda
CAC Junior Championships (Youth)
Bronze medal – third place	2010 Santo Domingo	100 m
Silver medal – second place	2010 Santo Domingo	200 m
CARIFTA Games (Youth)
Silver medal – second place	2010 George Town	100 m
Silver medal – second place	2010 George Town	200 m

Jeneko Place (born 27 January 1994) is a Bermudian sprinter.

He finished fifth in the boys' 200 metres at the 2010 Summer Youth Olympics.
