= Juan Pablo Martínez =

Mexican footballer (born 1999)

Personal information
- Full name: Juan Pablo Martínez Rodríguez
- Date of birth: 4 February 1999 (age 27)
- Place of birth: Guadalupe, Nuevo León, Mexico
- Height: 1.80 m (5 ft 11 in)
- Position: Full back

Youth career
- 2018–2019: Tigres

Senior career*
Years	Team	Apps	(Gls)
2019–2022	Tigres	4	(0)
2020–2022	→ Venados (loan)	67	(1)
2022–2023	Atlético San Luis	5	(0)
2023	→ Botafogo-SP (loan)	1	(0)
2024	Oaxaca	26	(0)
2025–2026	Correcaminos	0	(0)
- * Club domestic league appearances and goals as of 20:27, 25 July 2024 (UTC)

Juan Pablo Martínez Rodríguez (born 4 February 1999) is a Mexican professional footballer who plays as a full back.

== Career ==
Martínez began his professional career with Tigres UANL, making his Liga MX debut during the 2019–20 season. Seeking regular playing time, he was loaned to Venados F.C., where he became a regular starter in the Liga de Expansión MX between 2020 and 2022.

In 2022, he joined Atlético San Luis, returning to Liga MX. The following year, Martínez moved abroad for the first time in his career after being loaned to Brazilian club Botafogo-SP. He was announced as a new signing in July 2023, arriving on loan from Atlético San Luis.

Upon his presentation, Martínez highlighted the club's structure and stated that he was ready to play whenever called upon by the coaching staff.

After his stint in Brazil, he returned to Mexico, playing for Alebrijes de Oaxaca in 2024 before joining Correcaminos in 2025.

== Career statistics ==
=== Club ===
As of 10 May 2023

Club	Season	League			Cup		Continental		Other		Total	
Club	Season	Division	Apps	Goals	Apps	Goals	Apps	Goals	Apps	Goals	Apps	Goals
Tigres	2019–20	Liga MX	4	0	—		1 (Note: Appearance in CONCACAF Champions League)	0	—		5	0
Venados (loan)	2020–21	Liga de Expansión MX	32	1	—		—		—		32	1
Venados (loan)	2021–22	Liga de Expansión MX	35	0	—		—		—		35	0
Venados (loan)	Total		67	1	—		—		—		67	1
Atlético San Luis	2022–23	Liga MX	5	0	—		—		—		5	0
Career total			76	1	0	0	1	0	0	0	77	1
