= Antonio Sales =

American sprinter (born 1989)

Personal information
- Nationality: United States
- Born: January 26, 1989 (age 37) Chapel Hill, North Carolina

Sport
- Sport: Running
- Event(s): 100 metres 200 metres

Achievements and titles
- Personal best(s): 100 m: 10.33 s (Columbus 2008); 200 m: 20.54 s (Greensboro 2010)
Medal record
Representing United States
Men's athletics
World Junior Championships
Gold medal – first place	2008 Bydgoszcz	4×100 m relay

Antonio Sales (born January 26, 1989) is an American sprinter who specialises in the 200 metres.

At the 2008 World Junior Championships in Athletics held in Bydgoszcz, Poland, Sales won a gold medal over 4×100 metres relay.

== Personal best ==
Distance	Time	venue
100 m	10.33 s	Columbus, United States (June 20, 2008)
200 m	20.54 s	Greensboro, United States (May 29, 2010)
