= Eric Harris (athlete) =

American sprinter (born 1991)

Personal information
- Born: June 7, 1991 (age 35) Marietta, Georgia
- Height: 5 ft 10 in (1.78 m)

Sport
- Sport: Running
- Event(s): 100 metres, 200 metres
Medal record
Men's athletics
Representing the United States
World Junior Championships
Gold medal – first place	2010 Moncton	4×100 m relay

Eric Harris (born June 7, 1991) is an American sprinter who specialises in the 100 and 200 metres.

At the 2010 USA Junior Championships in Des Moines, Iowa, Harris finished third in the 100 metres (10.48 s), behind Mike Granger (10.30 s) and Charles Silmon (10.33 s). He finished runner-up in the 200 metres (21.53 s) behind Oliver Bradwell (21.48 s).

Teaming up with Silmon, Granger, and Bradwell in the 4 x 100 metres relay at the 2010 World Junior Championships in Athletics, Harris helped the U.S. to a winning time of 38.93 sec, which was the second-fastest ever at the World Junior Championships (behind the 38.66 s WJR run by the 2004 U.S. squad). Harris also participated in the 200 metres, but did not make it past the semifinal round.
