= Dexter Lee =

Jamaican sprinter (born 1991)

Personal information
- Nationality: Jamaica
- Born: 18 January 1991 (age 35) Montego Bay, Jamaica

Sport
- Sport: Athletics
- Event(s): 100 metres, 200 metres

Achievements and titles
- Personal best(s): 100 m: 10.06 (São Paulo 2011); 200 m: 20.86 (Spanish Town 2010)
Medal record
Men's athletics
Representing Jamaica
World Championships
Gold medal – first place	2011 Daegu	4 × 100 m relay
CAC Championships
Gold medal – first place	2011 Mayagüez	4 × 100 m relay
Bronze medal – third place	2011 Mayagüez	100 m
World Junior Championships
Gold medal – first place	2008 Bydgoszcz	100 m
Gold medal – first place	2010 Moncton	100 m
Silver medal – second place	2008 Bydgoszcz	4 × 100 m relay
Silver medal – second place	2010 Moncton	4 × 100 m relay
CARIFTA Games (Junior)
Gold medal – first place	2008 Basseterre	4 × 100 m relay
Silver medal – second place	2008 Basseterre	100 m
World Youth Championships
Gold medal – first place	2007 Ostrava	100 m
Bronze medal – third place	2007 Ostrava	Medley relay
CAC Junior Championships (U17)
Gold medal – first place	2006 Port of Spain	4 × 100 m relay
Silver medal – second place	2006 Port of Spain	100 m
CARIFTA Games (Youth)
Gold medal – first place	2006 Les Abymes	100 m
Gold medal – first place	2006 Les Abymes	4 × 100 m relay
Gold medal – first place	2007 Providenciales	100 m
Gold medal – first place	2007 Providenciales	200 m
Gold medal – first place	2007 Providenciales	4 × 100 m relay

Dexter Lee (born 18 January 1991) is a retired Jamaican sprinter who specialised in the 100 and 200 metres. He became the first athlete to win back-to-back titles at World Junior Championships in Athletics when he won the 100 metres in 2008 and 2010.

== Career ==
In 2006, his first international appearance ended with the win of two gold medals (100 metres, and 4 × 100 metres relay) at the CARIFTA Games., followed by three gold medals (100 metres, 200 metres, and 4 × 100 metres relay) at the 2007 CARIFTA Games. He won the 100 metres at the 2007 World Youth Championships in Athletics in a time of 10.51 seconds, before backing that up with the 100 metre title at the 2008 World Junior Championships in 10.40 seconds. In 2010, he won the 100 metres at the championships in Moncton with a time of 10.21 seconds. He was disqualified after a false start in the 200 m first round heats. He also won a silver medal in the 4 × 100 m relay at the 2010 World Junior Championships in Athletics.

In October 2009, Lee moved to Atlanta, Georgia, where he joined a training group that includes two-time Olympic 200 m champion Veronica Campbell-Brown. He has plans to enroll in a junior college in Atlanta.

Lee is a former student of Herbert Morrison Technical High School in Montego Bay. He is one of nine children—seven boys and two girls—and his older brother Keniel was himself a finalist in the Jamaican high school championships 100 metres.

== Personal Bests ==
Distance	Time	venue
100 m	10.06 s	São Paulo (22 May 2011)
200 m	20.86 s	Spanish Town (13 June 2010)

== Achievements ==
Year	Competition	Venue	Position	Event	Notes
Representing Jamaica
2006	CARIFTA Games (U-17)	Les Abymes, Guadeloupe	1st	100 m	10.72 (0.8 m/s)
2006	CARIFTA Games (U-17)	Les Abymes, Guadeloupe	1st	4 × 100 m relay	41.39
2006	Central American and Caribbean Junior Championships (U-17)	Port of Spain, Trinidad and Tobago	2nd	100 m	10.68 (1.8 m/s)
2006	Central American and Caribbean Junior Championships (U-17)	Port of Spain, Trinidad and Tobago	1st	4 × 100 m relay	40.83
2007	CARIFTA Games (U-17)	Providenciales, Turks and Caicos Islands	1st	100 m	10.34 CR (1.0 m/s)
2007	CARIFTA Games (U-17)	Providenciales, Turks and Caicos Islands	1st	200 m	21.09 CR (1.2 m/s)
2007	CARIFTA Games (U-17)	Providenciales, Turks and Caicos Islands	1st	4 × 100 m relay	41.11
2007	World Youth Championships	Ostrava, Czech Republic	1st	100 m	10.51 (-0.4 m/s)
2007	World Youth Championships	Ostrava, Czech Republic	3rd	1000 m Medley Relay (100 m + 200 m + 300 m + 400 m)	1:52.18
2008	CARIFTA Games (U-20)	Basseterre, Saint Kitts and Nevis	2nd	100 m	10.48 (0.1 m/s)
2008	CARIFTA Games (U-20)	Basseterre, Saint Kitts and Nevis	1st	4 × 100 m relay	39.80
2008	World Junior Championships	Bydgoszcz, Poland	1st	100 m	10.40 (-0.8 m/s)
2008	World Junior Championships	Bydgoszcz, Poland	2nd	4 × 100 m relay	39.25
2010	World Junior Championships	Moncton, New Brunswick, Canada	1st	100 m	10.21 (wind: -0.7 m/s)
2010	World Junior Championships	Moncton, New Brunswick, Canada	—	200 m	DQ
2010	World Junior Championships	Moncton, New Brunswick, Canada	2nd	4 × 100 m relay	39.55
