= Jake Hammond =

Australian sprinter

Jake Hammond (born 5 December 1991) is an Australian sprinter, who competed in the 2014 IAAF World Relays (4 × 100 metres relay, DNF in Final B) and the 2014 Commonwealth Games (4 × 100 metres relay, DQ in heat).

He works for KONE Australia as an employee of the technical services team (TSG).
