= Terrell Wilks =

American sprinter (born 1989)

Personal information
- Nationality: United States
- Born: December 30, 1989 (age 36) New Haven, Connecticut

Sport
- Sport: Running
- Event(s): 100 metres, 200 metres
- College team: Florida Gators

Achievements and titles
- Personal best(s): 100m: 10.11 (Gainesville 2009); 200m: 20.51 (Gainesville 2011)
Medal record
Men's athletics
Representing the United States
World Junior Championships
Gold medal – first place	2008 Bydgoszcz	4×100 m relay
Bronze medal – third place	2008 Bydgoszcz	100 m

Terrell Wilks (born December 30, 1989) is an American sprinter who specializes in the 100 and 200 metres. He competed for University of Florida and had numerous All American Honors. He then signed a professional contract with Saucony

A native of New Haven, Connecticut, Wilks attended Hillhouse High School where he won several state championships.

== Personal bests ==
Event	Time (seconds)	Venue	Date
60 meters	6.59	College Station, Florida	March 13, 2009
100 meters	10.11	Athens, Georgia	May 15, 2011
200 meters	20.51	Gainesville, Florida	April 16, 2011
