= Sabian Cox =

Trinidadian sprinter

Personal information
- Nationality: Trinidad and Tobago
- Born: 23 February 1991 (age 35)

Sport
- Sport: Running
- Event(s): 100 metres, 200 metres

Achievements and titles
- Personal best(s): 100 m: 10.35 (Port of Spain 2010); 200 m: 21.45 (George Town 2010)
Medal record
Men's athletics
Representing Trinidad & Tobago
World Junior Championships
Bronze medal – third place	2010 Moncton	4×100 m relay
CAC Junior Championships (Junior)
Bronze medal – third place	2010 Santo Domingo	100 m
Gold medal – first place	2010 Santo Domingo	4×100 m relay
CARIFTA Games (Junior)
Silver medal – second place	2010 George Town	4×100 m relay

Sabian Cox (born 23 February 1991) is a Trinidadian sprinter.

He won a bronze medal in the 100 metres at the 2010 Central American and Caribbean Junior Championships in Santo Domingo.
