= Oliver Bradwell =

American sprinter (born 1992)

Oliver Bradwell Jr.
Personal information
- Nationality: American
- Born: August 21, 1992 (age 33) Wichita, Kansas
- Height: 5 ft 10 in (1.78 m)
- Weight: 175 lb (79 kg)

Sport
- Sport: Running
- Event(s): 100m, 200m, 60m

Achievements and titles
- Personal best(s): 100m: 10.34s (Albuquerque 2010); 200m: 20.97s (Eugene 2011)
Medal record
Men's athletics
Representing the United States
World Junior Championships
| Gold medal – first place | 2010 Moncton | 4×100m relay |
Pan American Junior Championships
| Gold medal – first place | 2011 Miramar | 4×100 m relay |

Oliver Warren Bradwell Jr. (born August 21, 1992) is an American sprinter, who specializes in the 100 and 200 m dash. In 2010, he won a gold medal at the 13th IAAF World Junior Championships in Athletics at Stade Moncton in New Brunswick, Canada. He is a native of Wichita, Kansas.

== Early life ==
Born in Wichita, Kansas on August 21, 1992, Bradwell grew up excelling at many sports including soccer, football, and track and field. He was first discovered as having deceptive speed from a childhood track coach. When Bradwell started out running for Wichita Unity Track Club as an eight-year-old, he immediately had success in the 100 and 200 meters by breaking multiple meet and state records in his age group, which some still hold today and AAU Junior Olympic Games championships. In addition, he was an anchor leg of a nationally successful 4 × 100 m relay team along with second leg Deveon Dinwiddie (an incoming freshman as a Kansas State University running back), third leg Corey Henley (an incoming freshman at Northern Virginia Community College), and first leg D.J. Hubbard (a senior Running Back at La Hoya Community High School), who all possessed rare speed at a young age, toured the Missouri Valley Region with Bradwell throughout his early AAU career. Bradwell was also an All-Metro soccer player for Wichita East High School.

== Career ==
Bradwell also won the 100 m AAU Youth Outdoor national championship in 2009. Bradwell won an IAAF World Junior title anchoring Team USA in the 4 × 100 m relay at Moncton, New Brunswick, Canada in 2010. Teaming up with Charles Silmon, Eric Harris and Michael Granger, he helped the U.S. to a world-leading WL winning time of 38.93s, which was the third-fastest time ever run at the World Junior Championships in Athletics, behind the 38.66s WJR blazed by the 2004 U.S. team and the 38.92s posted by the 2002 U.S. team.

Despite being considered the top United States prep sprinter in 2010, Bradwell did not graduate from high school. He instead attended Barton County Community College, where he competed for the Barton Cougars track and field team in the NJCAA.

Bradwell is the first Kansas high school sprinter ever to win an IAAF world championship title and gold medal, and is currently the 100 m AAU and USATF Youth Outdoor national champion, and the 200 m USATF U20 Outdoor Championships national champion. Each of these titles were attained by Bradwell at the age of 17 in a 15,000 mile North American tour running from late June 2010 through early August 2010.

He won the young men's 100-meter dash for a second year at the USA Track and Field Junior Olympics in 2011 at Cessna Stadium with a time of 10.24 seconds.

He suffered a hamstring injury in 2011, but was reported to be back in training two years later.

== Personal Bests (PB) ==
| Distance | Time | Venue |
|---|---|---|
| 200 m | 20.97s | Eugene, Oregon (25 June 2011) |
| 60 m (Indoor) | 6.85s | Columbia, Missouri (20 February 2010) |

== Battery conviction ==
On November 3, 2015, Bradwell was sentenced to 45 months in prison for the August 2014 attack of a newly wed couple.

On September 4, he pled guilty to one count of aggravated battery. As part of 36 months post release supervision, Bradwell was ordered to pay over $12,600 in restitution.
