= 2010 World Junior Championships in Athletics =

- Host city: Moncton, New Brunswick, Canada
- Nations: 163
- Athletes: 1313
- Events: 44
- Dates: 19–25 July
- Opened by: Michaëlle Jean
- Main venue: Moncton Stadium

The 2010 World Junior Championships in Athletics was an international athletics competition for athletes under the age of 20 which was held at Moncton Stadium in Moncton, New Brunswick, Canada from 19 to 25 July 2010. A total of 44 athletics events were contested at the Championships, 22 by male and 22 by female athletes. It was the second time that the event took place in Canada, after the 1988 edition in Sudbury. This became the last event announced by Scott Davis.

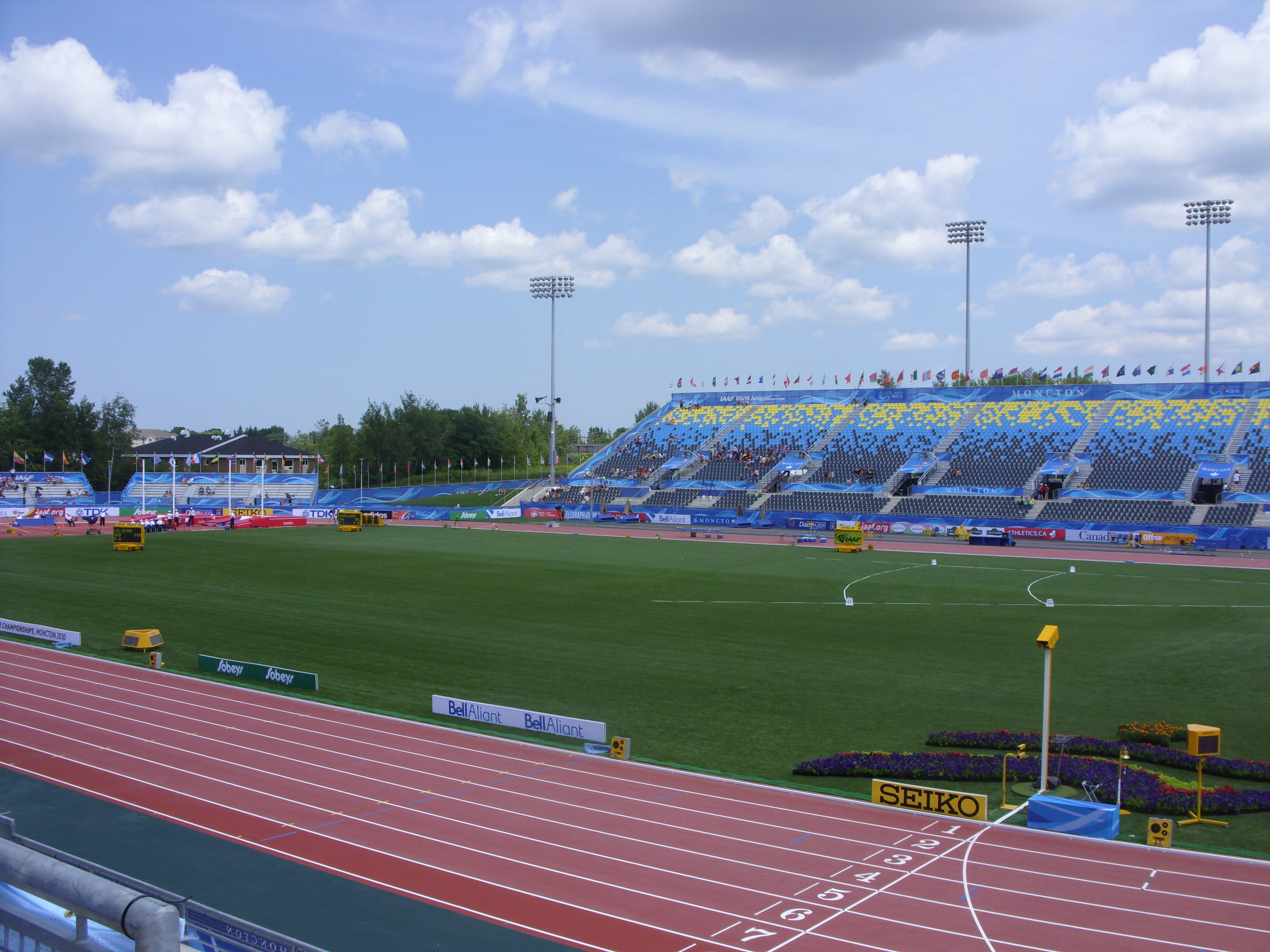
The New Moncton Stadium was built specifically to host the championships

Katsiaryna Artsiukh of Belarus, the winner of the women's 400 m hurdles title, had a positive test for Metenolone (a banned steroid) on the day of her victory. She was banned from the sport for two years.

== Opening ceremony ==
The competition opened the evening of 19 July and, following a ninety-minute light and music presentation, the championships were officially opened by the Prime Minister of Canada Stephen Harper and Gary Lunn, the Minister for Sport. One event was held on the first day, the women's 3000 metres, and the Prime Minister awarded Mercy Cherono with the first gold medal of the competition.

== Men's results ==
=== Track ===
Event	Gold		Silver		Bronze	
100 m	Dexter Lee; Jamaica	10.21	Charles Silmon; United States	10.23 PB	Jimmy Vicaut; France	10.28
100 m	Pre-race favourite Dexter Lee became the first man to win two consecutive 100 m titles at the competition.					
200 m	Shōta Iizuka; Japan	20.67	Aliaksandr Linnik; Belarus	20.89	Aaron Brown; Canada	21.00 PB
200 m	Iizuka became Japan's first sprint winner at the championships. The highly favoured Dexter Lee had a false start in the heats.					
400 m	Kirani James; Grenada	45.89	Marcell Deák-Nagy; Hungary	46.09	Errol Nolan; United States	46.36
400 m	James won but was still disappointed with his performance, saying: "I don't care about championships, I just care about running fast."					
800 m	David Mutinda Mutua; Kenya	1:46.41 PB	Casimir Loxsom; United States	1:46.57 PB	Robby Andrews; United States	1:47.00
800 m	With their second- and third-place finish, Loxsom and Andrews became the first American males to medal in a middle distance event at the world junior championships.					
1500 m	Caleb Mwangangi Ndiku; Kenya	3:37.30 PB	Abderrahmane Anou; Algeria	3:38.86	Mohamad Al-Garni; Qatar	3:38.91
5000 m	David Kiprotich Bett; Kenya	13:23.76	John Kipkoech; Kenya	13:26.03 PB	Aziz Lahbabi; Morocco	13:28.92 NJR
10,000 m	Dennis Chepkongin Masai; Kenya	27:53.88 WJL	Gebretsadik Abraha; Ethiopia	28:03.45 PB	Paul Kipchumba Lonyangata; Kenya	28:14.55 PB
10,000 m	Dennis Masai won his first international medal, following his siblings Moses Ndiema Masai and Linet Masai onto the global stage.					
110 m hurdles (99.0 cm)	Pascal Martinot-Lagarde; France	13.52	Vladimir Vukicevic; Norway	13.59	Jack Meredith; Great Britain	13.59
400 m hurdles	Jehue Gordon; Trinidad and Tobago	49.30	Takatoshi Abe; Japan	49.46 PB	Leslie Murray; U.S. Virgin Islands	50.22 SB
3000 m steeplechase	Jonathan Muia Ndiku; Kenya	8:23.48	Albert Kiptoo Yator; Kenya	8:33.55 PB	Jacob Araptany; Uganda	8:37.02
4×100 m relay	United States; Michael Granger; Charles Silmon; Eric Harris; Oliver Bradwell	38.93 WJL	Jamaica; Brandon Tomlinson; Bernardo Brady; Odean Skeen; Dexter Lee	39.55 SB	Trinidad and Tobago; Jamol James; Sabian Cox; Moriba Morain; Shermund Allsop	39.72 SB
4×400 m relay	United States; Joshua Mance; Errol Nolan; David Verburg; Michael Berry	3:04.76 WJL	Nigeria; Japhet Samuel; Tobi Ogunmola; Jonathan Nmaju; Salihu Isah	3:06.36 NJR	Great Britain; Nathan Wake; Dan Putnam; Sebastian Rodger; Jack Green	3:06.49 SB
10,000 m walk	Valery Filipchuk; Russia	40:43.17 WJL	Cai Zelin; China	40:43.59 PB	Petr Bogatyrev; Russia	40:50.37 PB

=== Field ===
Event	Gold		Silver		Bronze	
High jump	Mutaz Essa Barshim; Qatar	2.30	David Smith; United States	2.24 PB	Naoto Tobe; Japan	2.21 SB
Pole vault	Anton Ivakin; Russia	5.50 WJL	Claudio Stecchi; Italy	5.40 PB	Andrew Sutcliffe; Great Britain	5.35 PB
Long jump	Luvo Manyonga; South Africa	7.99	Eusebio Cáceres; Spain	7.90	Taylor Stewart; Canada	7.63
Long jump	Manyonga emulated Godfrey Khotso Mokoena to become the second African ever to medal in the long jump at the championships. Stewart won Canada's first medal with his final effort.					
Triple jump	Aleksey Fyodorov; Russia	16.68	Ernesto Revé; Cuba	16.47	Omar Craddock; United States	16.23
Shot put (6 kg)	Jacko Gill; New Zealand	20.76 WJL	Božidar Antunović; Serbia	20.20 NJR	Ding Yongheng; China	20.14 PB
Shot put (6 kg)	The 15-year-old Gill beat out Antunovic (age 18) and Ding (age 19), surpassing Usain Bolt as the youngest ever world junior champion.					
Discus throw (1.750 kg)	Andrius Gudžius; Lithuania	63.78	Andrei Gag; Romania	61.85 PB	Julian Wruck; Australia	61.09
Hammer throw (6 kg)	Conor McCullough; United States	80.79 CR, NJR	Ákos Hudi; Hungary	78.37	Alaa El-Din El-Ashry; Egypt	76.66 PB
Javelin throw	Till Wöschler; Germany	82.52 WJL	Genki Dean; Japan	76.44 PB	Dmitri Tarabin; Russia	76.42
Decathlon (junior)	Kevin Mayer; France	7928 PB	Ilya Shkurenev; Russia	7830 PB	Marcus Nilsson; Sweden	7751 PB
Decathlon (junior)	Kevin Mayer defended a first-day lead and won the title in the 1500 m final event, overtaking Russian Ilya Shkurenev.					

== Women's results ==
=== Track ===
Event	Gold		Silver		Bronze	
100 m	Jodie Williams; Great Britain	11.40	Takeia Pinckney; United States	11.49	Jamile Samuel; Netherlands	11.56
100 m	Reigning youth champion Jodie Williams extended her undefeated streak to win her first junior title.					
200 m	Stormy Kendrick; United States	22.99 PB	Jodie Williams; Great Britain	23.19	Jamile Samuel; Netherlands	23.27
200 m	Kendrick produced a lifetime best to finally bring an end to Jodie Williams' four-year-long, 151-race winning streak.					
400 m	Shaunae Miller; Bahamas	52.52	Margaret Etim; Nigeria	53.05	Bianca Răzor; Romania	53.17
400 m	Sixteen-year-old Miller overhauled the more favoured Etim, who held the world junior leading time.					
800 m	Elena Mirela Lavric; Romania	2:01.85	Cherono Koech; Kenya	2:02.29	Annet Negesa; Uganda	2:02.51
1500 m	Tizita Bogale; Ethiopia	4:08.06 PB	Ciara Mageean; Ireland	4:09.51 NJR	Nancy Chepkwemoi; Kenya	4:11.04 PB
3000 m	Mercy Cherono; Kenya	8:55.07 WJL	Emebet Anteneh; Ethiopia	8:55.24 PB	Layes Abdullayeva; Azerbaijan	8:55.33 NJR
3000 m	Cherono took her second consecutive World Junior title, becoming the first woman to repeat as World Junior champion in the 3000 m.					
5000 m	Genzebe Dibaba; Ethiopia	15:08.06 CR	Mercy Cherono; Kenya	15:09.19	Alice Aprot Nawowuna; Kenya	15:17.39 PB
5000 m	A fraught duel between Mercy Cherono and Genzebe Dibaba was decided when Cherono stumbled in the final stages, allowing the Ethiopian to win.					
100 m hurdles	Isabelle Pedersen; Norway	13.30 NJR	Jenna Pletsch; Germany	13.35	Miriam Hehl; Germany	13.46
400 m hurdles	Vera Rudakova; Russia	57.16 PB	Evonne Britton; United States	57.32 PB	Shiori Miki; Japan	57.35 NJR
3000 m steeplechase	Purity Cherotich Kirui; Kenya	9:36.34 PB	Birtukan Adamu; Ethiopia	9:43.23 PB	Lucia Kamene Muangi; Kenya	9:43.71 PB
3000 m steeplechase	A pile up at the water jump enabled Kirui to construct her victory. German, Spanish, Italian and Mexican junior records were broken and home athlete Genevieve Lalonde set a NACAC junior record.					
4×100 m relay	United States; Stormy Kendrick; Takeia Pinckney; Dezerea Bryant; Ashley Collier	43.44; WJL	Germany; Nadja Bahl; Leena Günther; Tatjana Pinto; Stefanie Pähler	43.74; NJR	Netherlands; Dafne Schippers; Loreanne Kuhurima; Eva Lubbers; Jamile Samuel	44.09; NJR
4×400 m relay	United States; Diamond Dixon; Stacey-Ann Smith; Laura Roesler; Regina George	3:31.20; WJL	Nigeria; Nkiruka Florence Uwakwe; Bukola Abogunloko; Chizoba Okodogbe; Margaret Etim	3:31.84; SB	Jamaica; Jody Ann Muir; Janieve Russell; Natoya Goule; Chris-Ann Gordon	3:32.24; SB
10,000 m walk	Elena Lashmanova; Russia	44:11.90 WJL	Anna Lukyanova; Russia	44:17.98 PB	Kumiko Okada; Japan	45:56.15
10,000 m walk	Elena Lashmanova and Anna Lukyanova controlled the race for a Russian 1–2, leaving pre race favourite Kumiko Okada trailing for bronze.					

=== Field ===
Event	Gold		Silver		Bronze	
High jump	Marija Vuković; Montenegro	1.91 NR	Airinė Palšytė; Lithuania	1.89	Elena Vallortigara; Italy	1.89
High jump	Vuković became the first Montenegrin to win a medal of any kind in athletics.					
Pole vault	Angelica Bengtsson; Sweden	4.25 NJR	Victoria von Eynatten; Germany	4.20	Holly Bleasdale; Great Britain	4.15
Long jump	Irisdaymi Herrera; Cuba	6.41 PB	Wang Wupin; China	6.23	Marharyta Tverdohlib; Ukraine	6.20
Triple jump	Dailenys Alcántara; Cuba	14.09	Laura Samuel; Great Britain	13.75 NJR	Deng Lina; China	13.72 PB
Shot put	Meng Qianqian; China	16.94	Cui Shuang; China	16.13	Evgeniya Smirnova; Russia	15.75
Shot put	Brazilian Geisa Arcanjo initially won the gold medal, but later was disqualified for doping.					
Discus throw	Yaime Pérez; Cuba	56.01	Erin Pendleton; United States	54.96	Yuliya Kurylo; Ukraine	53.96
Hammer throw	Sophie Hitchon; Great Britain	66.01 NJR	Barbara Špiler; Slovenia	65.28	Zhang Li; China	63.96
Javelin throw	Sanni Utriainen; Finland	56.69 PB	Līna Mūze; Latvia	56.64 PB	Tazmin Brits; South Africa	54.55
Heptathlon	Dafne Schippers; Netherlands	5967 PB	Sara Gambetta; Germany	5770 PB	Helga Margrét Thorsteinsdóttir; Iceland	5706

== Medal table ==
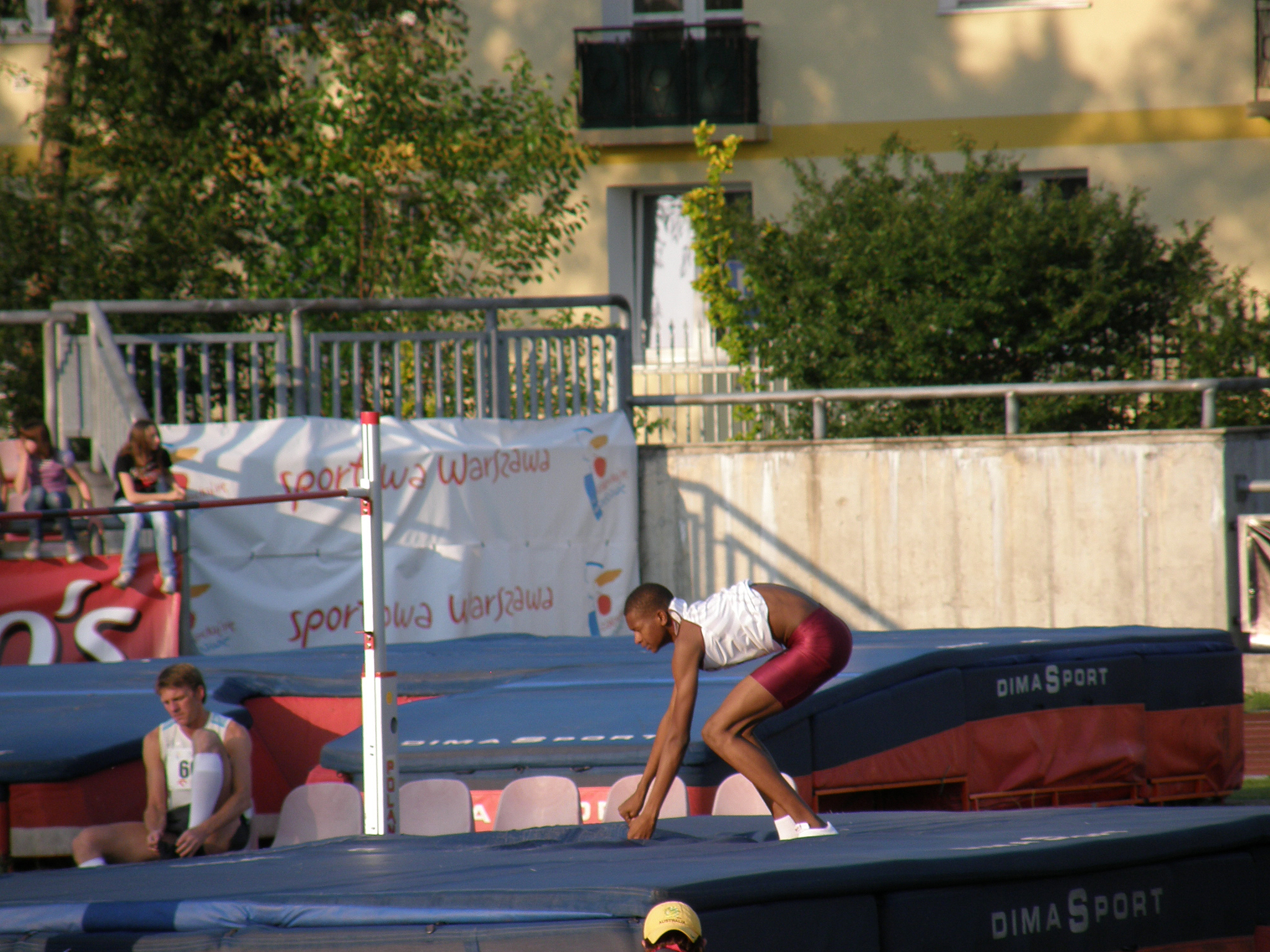
Mutaz Essa Barshim won Qatar's only gold in the men's high jump.

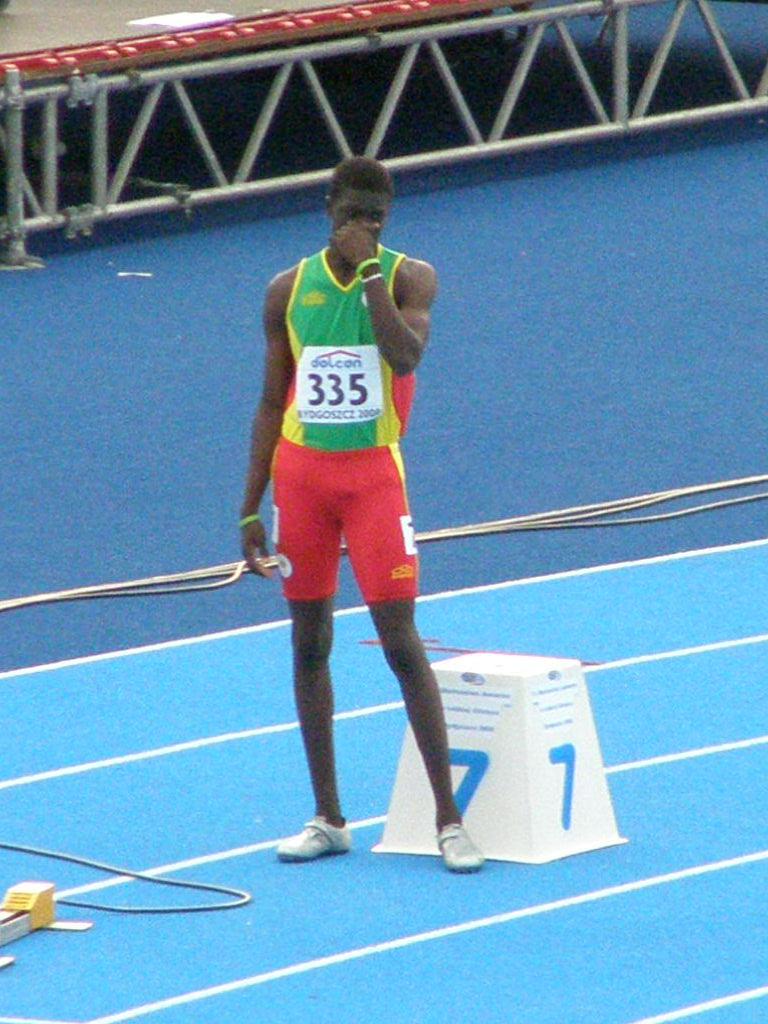
Kirani James of Grenada won 400 m gold after his silver in 2008.

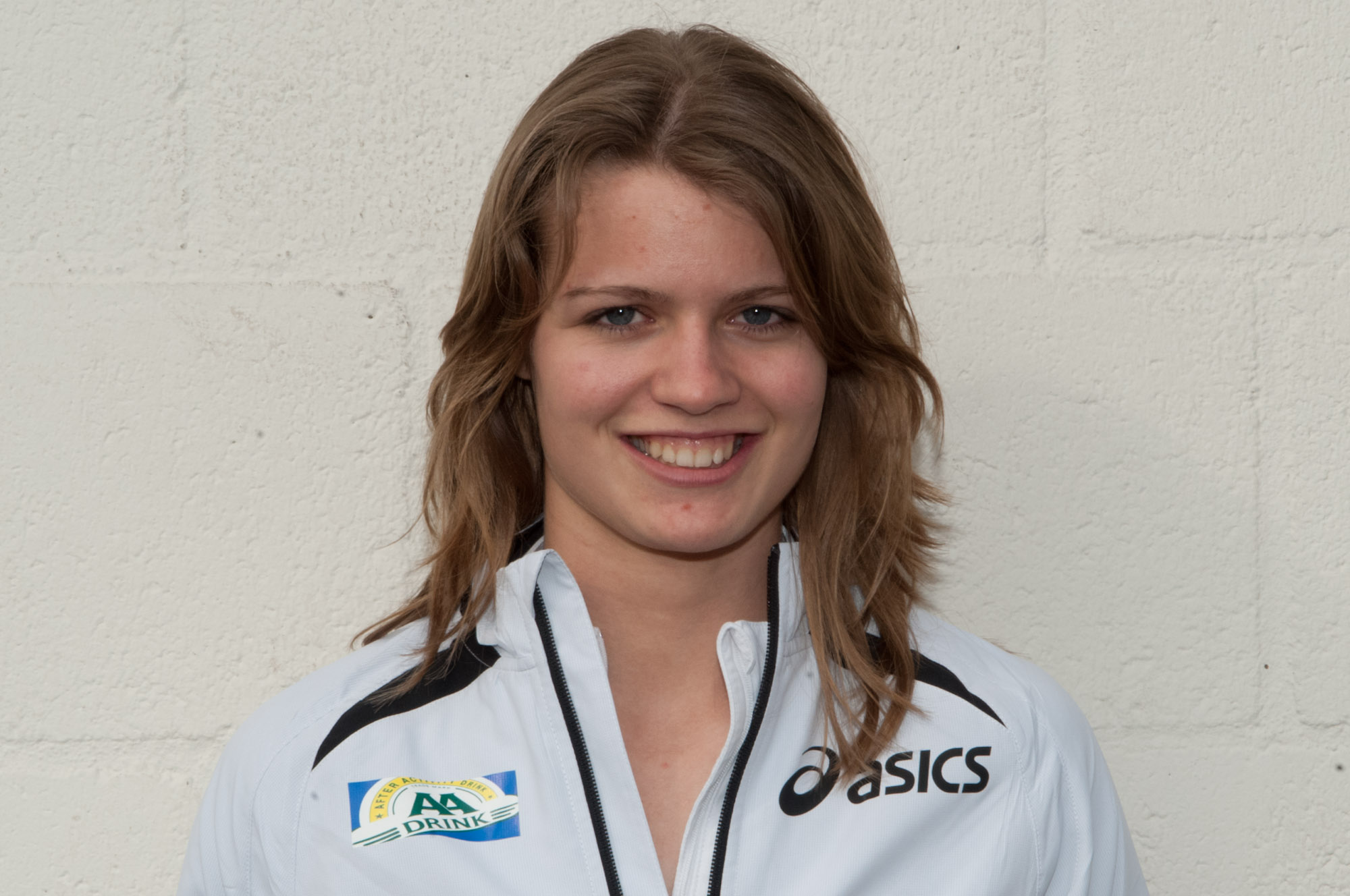
Dafne Schippers won the heptathlon gold for the Netherlands.

* Host nation (Canada)

Rank	Nation	Gold	Silver	Bronze	Total
1	Kenya (KEN)	7	4	4	15
2	United States (USA)	6	6	3	15
3	Russia (RUS)	5	2	3	10
4	Cuba (CUB)	3	1	0	4
5	Ethiopia (ETH)	2	3	0	5
6	Great Britain (GBR)	2	2	4	8
7	France (FRA)	2	0	1	3
8	Germany (GER)	1	4	1	6
9	China (CHN)	1	3	3	7
10	Japan (JPN)	1	2	3	6
11	Jamaica (JAM)	1	1	1	3
11	Romania (ROU)	1	1	1	3
13	Lithuania (LTU)	1	1	0	2
13	Norway (NOR)	1	1	0	2
15	Netherlands (NED)	1	0	3	4
16	Qatar (QAT)	1	0	1	2
16	South Africa (RSA)	1	0	1	2
16	Sweden (SWE)	1	0	1	2
16	Trinidad and Tobago (TRI)	1	0	1	2
20	Bahamas (BAH)	1	0	0	1
20	Finland (FIN)	1	0	0	1
20	Grenada (GRN)	1	0	0	1
20	Montenegro (MNE)	1	0	0	1
20	New Zealand (NZL)	1	0	0	1
25	Nigeria (NGA)	0	3	0	3
26	Hungary (HUN)	0	2	0	2
27	Italy (ITA)	0	1	1	2
28	Algeria (ALG)	0	1	0	1
28	Belarus (BLR)	0	1	0	1
28	Ireland (IRL)	0	1	0	1
28	Latvia (LAT)	0	1	0	1
28	Serbia (SRB)	0	1	0	1
28	Slovenia (SLO)	0	1	0	1
28	Spain (ESP)	0	1	0	1
35	Canada (CAN)*	0	0	2	2
35	Uganda (UGA)	0	0	2	2
35	Ukraine (UKR)	0	0	2	2
38	Australia (AUS)	0	0	1	1
38	Azerbaijan (AZE)	0	0	1	1
38	Egypt (EGY)	0	0	1	1
38	Iceland (ISL)	0	0	1	1
38	Morocco (MAR)	0	0	1	1
38	U.S. Virgin Islands (ISV)	0	0	1	1
Totals (43 entries)		44	44	44	132

- All Information taken from IAAF's website.

== Participation ==
According to an unofficial count through an unofficial result list, 1313 athletes from 163 countries participated in the event. This is in agreement with the official numbers as published.

- Albania (1)
- Algeria (13)
- Anguilla (2)
- Argentina (4)
- Armenia (1)
- Aruba (1)
- Australia (35)
- Austria (5)
- Azerbaijan (2)
- Bahamas (22)
- Bahrain (8)
- Barbados (4)
- Belarus (12)
- Belgium (15)
- Benin (1)
- Bermuda (1)
- Botswana (4)
- Brazil (20)
- British Virgin Islands (2)
- Bulgaria (5)
- Burkina Faso (1)
- Burundi (1)
- Cameroon (1)
- Canada (57)
- Cayman Islands (1)
- Central African Republic (1)
- Chile (3)
- China (21)
- Chinese Taipei (13)
- Colombia (4)
- Comoros (1)
- DR Congo (1)
- Cook Islands (1)
- Costa Rica (1)
- Côte d'Ivoire (1)
- Croatia (6)
- Cuba (10)
- Cyprus (10)
- Czech Republic (14)
- Denmark (2)
- Dominica (1)
- Dominican Republic (4)
- Ecuador (4)
- Egypt (8)
- El Salvador (1)
- Estonia (9)
- Ethiopia (19)
- Fiji (1)
- Finland (18)
- France (43)
- French Polynesia (1)
- Gabon (1)
- Gambia (1)
- Germany (64)
- Ghana (1)
- Gibraltar (1)
- Great Britain (43)
- Greece (8)
- Grenada (2)
- Guam (1)
- Guatemala (1)
- Guinea (1)
- Guinea-Bissau (1)
- Guyana (1)
- Haiti (1)
- Hong Kong (2)
- Hungary (16)
- Iceland (3)
- India (10)
- Indonesia (2)
- Iran (3)
- Iraq (2)
- Ireland (9)
- Israel (4)
- Italy (41)
- Jamaica (33)
- Japan (36)
- Jordan (1)
- Kazakhstan (6)
- Kenya (24)
- Kiribati (1)
- Kuwait (3)
- Laos (1)
- Latvia (8)
- Lebanon (1)
- Lesotho (1)
- Lithuania (4)
- Luxembourg (2)
- Macau (1)
- Macedonia (1)
- Malawi (1)
- Malaysia (1)
- Maldives (1)
- Malta (1)
- Marshall Islands (1)
- Mauritius (1)
- Mexico (16)
- Micronesia (1)
- Moldova (2)
- Mongolia (1)
- Montenegro (2)
- Montserrat (1)
- Morocco (8)
- Namibia (1)
- Nauru (1)
- Netherlands (15)
- Netherlands Antilles (2)
- New Zealand (22)
- Niger (1)
- Nigeria (14)
- Norway (13)
- Palau (1)
- Panama (1)
- Papua New Guinea (1)
- Paraguay (1)
- Peru (3)
- Poland (38)
- Portugal (8)
- Puerto Rico (5)
- Qatar (6)
- Romania (22)
- Russia (38)
- Rwanda (1)
- Saint Kitts and Nevis (2)
- Saint Lucia (1)
- Saint Vincent and the Grenadines (1)
- Samoa (1)
- San Marino (1)
- São Tomé and Príncipe (1)
- Saudi Arabia (9)
- Senegal (1)
- Serbia (8)
- Seychelles (1)
- Singapore (1)
- Slovakia (2)
- Slovenia (11)
- Solomon Islands (1)
- South Africa (22)
- South Korea (12)
- Spain (35)
- Sri Lanka (1)
- Sudan (2)
- Suriname (1)
- Sweden (26)
- Switzerland (9)
- Syria (1)
- Tajikistan (2)
- Tanzania (1)
- Thailand (6)
- Trinidad and Tobago (19)
- Tunisia (3)
- Turkey (14)
- Turks and Caicos Islands (1)
- Uganda (5)
- Ukraine (23)
- United States (81)
- Uruguay (1)
- U.S. Virgin Islands (3)
- Uzbekistan (3)
- Vanuatu (1)
- Venezuela (4)
- Zambia (1)
- Zimbabwe (5)

== See also ==
- List of junior world records in athletics
- 2010 in athletics (track and field)
