= 2014 NACAC Under-23 Championships in Athletics – Results =

These are the results of the 2014 NACAC Under-23 Championships in Athletics which took place from August 8 to 10 at the Hillside Stadium in Kamloops, British Columbia, Canada.

== Men's results ==
=== 100 meters ===
Heats – 8 August Wind: Heat 1: +2.4 m/s, Heat 2: +2.6 m/s

Rank	Heat	Name	Nationality	Time	Notes
1	2	Trevorvano Mackey	Bahamas	10.21 w	Q
2	1	Diondre Batson	United States	10.30 w	Q
3	2	Julius Morris	Montserrat	10.31 w	Q
4	2	Antwan Wright	United States	10.32 w	Q
5	1	Tyquendo Tracey	Jamaica	10.34 w	Q
6	2	Kwisi McFarlane	Jamaica	10.39 w	q
7	2	Juan Carlos Alanis	Mexico	10.47 w	q
8	2	Carlos Rodríguez	Puerto Rico	10.49 w	
9	1	Benjamin Williams	Canada	10.54 w	Q
10	1	Moriba Morain	Trinidad and Tobago	10.57 w	
11	1	Lester Ryan	Montserrat	10.66 w	
12	1	Kemner Watson	Costa Rica	10.92 w	

Final – 8 August – Wind: +0.2 m/s

Rank	Name	Nationality	Time	Notes
1st place, gold medalist(s)	Diondre Batson	United States	10.08	
2nd place, silver medalist(s)	Tyquendo Tracey	Jamaica	10.21	
3rd place, bronze medalist(s)	Trevorvano Mackey	Bahamas	10.30	
4	Julius Morris	Montserrat	10.41	
5	Antwan Wright	United States	10.44	
6	Benjamin Williams	Canada	10.46	
7	Kwisi McFarlane	Jamaica	10.49	
8	Juan Carlos Alanis	Mexico	10.54	

=== 200 meters ===
Final – 10 August – Wind: +1.5 m/s

Rank	Name	Nationality	Time	Notes
1st place, gold medalist(s)	Remonty McClain	United States	20.32	
2nd place, silver medalist(s)	Trevorvano Mackey	Bahamas	20.46	
3rd place, bronze medalist(s)	Everton Clarke	Jamaica	20.51	
4	Julius Morris	Montserrat	20.52	NR
5	Aaron Ernest	United States	20.81	
6	Drelan Bramwell	Canada	21.07	
7	Benjamin Williams	Canada	21.15	
8	Nicholas Deshong	Barbados	21.24	

=== 400 meters ===
Heats – 8 August

Rank	Heat	Name	Nationality	Time	Notes
1	2	Bralon Taplin	Grenada	45.64	Q
2	2	Vernon Norwood	United States	45.65	Q
3	1	Brycen Spratling	United States	46.37	Q
4	2	Benjamin Ayesu-Attah	Canada	47.10	Q
5	1	Burkheart Ellis	Barbados	47.28	Q
6	2	Lestrod Roland	Saint Kitts and Nevis	47.25	q
7	2	Kavoy Nelson	Jamaica	47.31	q
8	1	Nathan George	Canada	47.41	Q
9	1	Marzel Miller	Jamaica	48.40	
10	2	Denovan Hernández	Costa Rica	48.65	
11	1	César Vásquez	Costa Rica	49.13	

Final – 9 August

Rank	Name	Nationality	Time	Notes
1st place, gold medalist(s)	Brycen Spratling	United States	45.18	
2nd place, silver medalist(s)	Bralon Taplin	Grenada	45.52	
3rd place, bronze medalist(s)	Vernon Norwood	United States	45.56	
4	Benjamin Ayesu-Attah	Canada	47.06	
5	Burkheart Ellis	Barbados	47.10	
6	Nathan George	Canada	47.21	
7	Lestrod Roland	Saint Kitts and Nevis	47.79	
8	Kavoy Nelson	Jamaica	50.38	

=== 800 meters ===
Heats – 9 August

Rank	Heat	Name	Nationality	Time	Notes
1	2	Alexis Sotelo	Mexico	1:52.13	Q
2	1	Tyler Smith	Canada	1:52.75	Q
3	2	Christopher Low	United States	1:52.86	Q
4	2	Thomas Riva	Canada	1:52.90	Q
5	2	David Hodgson	Costa Rica	1:53.00	q
6	2	Mark London	Trinidad and Tobago	1:53.02	q
7	1	Bryan Martínez	Mexico	1:53.10	Q
8	1	Drew Windle	United States	1:54.83	Q
9	1	Víctor Emilio Ortíz	Costa Rica	1:57.06	
10	1	Alexshandro Rodriguez	United States Virgin Islands	1:59.74	

Final – 10 August

Rank	Name	Nationality	Time	Notes
1st place, gold medalist(s)	Bryan Martínez	Mexico	1:47.90	
2nd place, silver medalist(s)	Thomas Riva	Canada	1:48.19	
3rd place, bronze medalist(s)	Christopher Low	United States	1:48.46	
4	Tyler Smith	Canada	1:49.51	
5	Drew Windle	United States	1:51.62	
6	Alexis Sotelo	Mexico	1:51.85	
7	Mark London	Trinidad and Tobago	1:52.87	
8	David Hodgson	Costa Rica	1:53.58	

=== 1500 meters ===
Final – 8 August

Rank	Name	Nationality	Time	Notes
1st place, gold medalist(s)	Matthew Hillenbrand	United States	3:54.85	
2nd place, silver medalist(s)	Connor Darlington	Canada	3:55.36	
3rd place, bronze medalist(s)	Edgar Alan García	Mexico	3:55.67	
4	Trey Simons	Bermuda	3:58.83	

=== 5000 meters ===
Final – 9 August

Rank	Name	Nationality	Time	Notes
1st place, gold medalist(s)	Edgar Alan García	Mexico	14:35.00	
2nd place, silver medalist(s)	Christopher Bendtsen	United States	15:17.80	
3rd place, bronze medalist(s)	Juan Francisco Félix	Dominican Republic	15:39.41	

=== 10,000 meters ===
Final – 8 August

Rank	Name	Nationality	Time	Notes
1st place, gold medalist(s)	Christopher Bendtsen	United States	31:43.37	
2nd place, silver medalist(s)	Christopher Enriquez	United States	31:47.77	
3rd place, bronze medalist(s)	Kenneth Robles	Costa Rica	33:51.53	

=== 3000 meters steeplechase ===
Final – 10 August

Rank	Name	Nationality	Time	Notes
1st place, gold medalist(s)	Christopher Dulhanty	Canada	8:56.60	
2nd place, silver medalist(s)	Mason Ferlic	United States	9:04.78	
3rd place, bronze medalist(s)	Edward Owens	United States	9:18.87	
4	Juan Francisco Félix	Dominican Republic	9:20.08	
5	Luis López Rivera	Puerto Rico	9:31.86	

=== 110 meters hurdles ===
Final – 9 August – Wind: +2.1 m/s

Rank	Name	Nationality	Time	Notes
1st place, gold medalist(s)	Eddie Lovett	United States Virgin Islands	13.39 w	
2nd place, silver medalist(s)	Vincent Wyatt	United States	13.55 w	
3rd place, bronze medalist(s)	Gregory MacNeill	Canada	13.83 w	
4	Freddie Crittenden	United States	13.89 w	
5	Stefan Fennell	Jamaica	14.22 w	
6	Jonathan Santiago	Puerto Rico	14.50 w	
7	César Humberto Ramírez	Mexico	14.54 w	

=== 400 meters hurdles ===
Final – 10 August

Rank	Name	Nationality	Time	Notes
1st place, gold medalist(s)	Trevor Brown	United States	49.92	
2nd place, silver medalist(s)	Michael Stigler	United States	49.98	Warning 162.5
3rd place, bronze medalist(s)	Gerald Drummond	Costa Rica	51.05	
4	Andre Clarke	Jamaica	51.73	

=== High jump ===
Final – 10 August

Rank	Name	Nationality	Result	Notes
1st place, gold medalist(s)	Ryan Ingraham	Bahamas	2.28m	CR
2nd place, silver medalist(s)	Dakarai Hightower	United States	2.10m	
3rd place, bronze medalist(s)	Domanique Missick	Turks and Caicos Islands	2.00m	
4	George Rivera	Puerto Rico	1.90m	
5	Theron Niles	Anguilla	1.90m	
	JaCorian Duffield	United States	NH	

=== Pole vault ===
Final – 10 August

Rank	Name	Nationality	Result	Notes
1st place, gold medalist(s)	Jacob Blankenship	United States	5.50m	
2nd place, silver medalist(s)	Chase Wolfle	United States	5.20m	
3rd place, bronze medalist(s)	Víctor Manuel Castillero	Mexico	4.80m	
4	Joel Paris Castro	Puerto Rico	4.60m	

=== Long jump ===
Final – 8 August

Rank	Name	Nationality	Result	Notes
1st place, gold medalist(s)	Braxton Drummond	United States	7.64m (1.1 m/s)	
2nd place, silver medalist(s)	Devin Field	United States	7.51m (1.7 m/s)	
3rd place, bronze medalist(s)	Sedeekie Edie	Jamaica	7.41m (1.3 m/s)	
4	Sendy Mercedes	Dominican Republic	7.38m (1.9 m/s)	
5	Michane Ricketts	Jamaica	7.23m (1.2 m/s)	
6	Irvin Basorio	Mexico	7.18m (-0.9 m/s)	
7	Alfredo Smith	Bahamas	6.93m (0.4 m/s)	
8	Jumonne Exeter	Saint Vincent and the Grenadines	6.57m (1.1 m/s)	
9	Ifeanyichukwu Otuonye	Turks and Caicos Islands	3.84m (-1.2 m/s)	
	Kyode Simmons	Grenada	FOUL ( m/s)	

=== Triple jump ===
Final – 10 August

Rank	Name	Nationality	Result	Notes
1st place, gold medalist(s)	Eric Sloan	United States	16.20m (0.1 m/s)	
2nd place, silver medalist(s)	Steve Waithe	Trinidad and Tobago	15.94m (1.2 m/s)	
3rd place, bronze medalist(s)	Lathone Collie-Minns	Bahamas	15.86m (1.0 m/s)	
4	Matthew O'Neal	United States	15.70m (0.2 m/s)	
5	Jumonne Exeter	Saint Vincent and the Grenadines	15.12m (0.4 m/s)	
6	Aubrey Allen	Jamaica	14.98m (0.6 m/s)	
7	Kyode Simmons	Grenada	14.54m (0.7 m/s)	
8	Sendy Mercedes	Dominican Republic	14.43m (0.4 m/s)	

=== Shot put ===
Final – 10 August

Rank	Name	Nationality	Result	Notes
1st place, gold medalist(s)	Willy Irwin	United States	19.44m	
2nd place, silver medalist(s)	Darrell Hill	United States	18.85m	
3rd place, bronze medalist(s)	Akeem Stewart	Trinidad and Tobago	17.76m	
4	Sullivan Parker	Canada	17.68m	
5	Eldred Henry	British Virgin Islands	16.98m	
6	Tristan Whitehall	Barbados	16.36m	

=== Discus throw ===
Final – 8 August

Rank	Name	Nationality	Result	Notes
1st place, gold medalist(s)	Rodney Brown	United States	63.34m	CR
2nd place, silver medalist(s)	Tavis Bailey	United States	57.37m	
3rd place, bronze medalist(s)	Jordan Young	Canada	53.42m	
4	Eldred Henry	British Virgin Islands	52.15m	
5	Kellon Alexis	Grenada	51.09m	
6	Tristan Whitehall	Barbados	47.99m	
	Lindon Victor	Grenada	FOUL	

=== Hammer throw ===
Final – 10 August

Rank	Name	Nationality	Result	Notes
1st place, gold medalist(s)	Diego del Real	Mexico	69.42m	
2nd place, silver medalist(s)	Matthias Tayala	United States	68.93m	
3rd place, bronze medalist(s)	Adam Keenan	Canada	68.35m	
4	Gregory Skipper	United States	68.15m	
5	Jordan Young	Canada	62.24m	
6	Alexis Figueroa	Puerto Rico	61.70m	
7	Kellon Alexis	Grenada	53.59m	

=== Javelin throw ===
Final – 9 August

Rank	Name	Nationality	Result	Notes
1st place, gold medalist(s)	Michael Shuey	United States	76.02m	
2nd place, silver medalist(s)	David Ocampo	Mexico	75.28m	
3rd place, bronze medalist(s)	Raymond Dykstra	Canada	73.63m	
4	Christopher Carper	United States	72.75m	
5	Evan Karakolis	Canada	66.78m	
6	Lindon Victor	Grenada	65.28m	

=== Decathlon ===
Final – 10 August

The highest mark recorded in each event is highlighted in yellow

Rank	Name	Nationality	100m	LJ	SP	HJ	400m	110m H	DT	PV	JT	1500m	Points	Notes
1st place, gold medalist(s)	James Turner	Canada	10.99 (0.1); 863	7.13m (-0.7); 845	12.93m 663	1.83m 653	49.06 858	15.12 (0.1); 835	36.29m 590	4.30m 702	59.19m 726	4:21:52 801	7536	CR
2nd place, silver medalist(s)	Soloman Ijah	United States	11.38 (0.1); 778	6.22m (0.8); 635	14.07m 733	1.83m 653	50.20 805	14.93 (0.1); 858	38.29m 630	4.30m 702	54.24m 652	5:02:21 547	6993	
3rd place, bronze medalist(s)	Kale Wolken	United States	11.42 (0.1); 769	6.97m (-0.5); 807	11.39m 569	NH 0	DNF 0	DNF (0.1); 0	31.34m 491	NH 0	40.13m 444	DNF 0	3080	

=== 20,000 meters walk ===
Final – 10 August

Rank	Name	Nationality	Time	Notes
1st place, gold medalist(s)	Benjamin Thorne	Canada	1:29:08.64	
2nd place, silver medalist(s)	Emmanuel Corvera	United States	1:31:30.86	
3rd place, bronze medalist(s)	Alejandro Chavez	United States	1:33:26.31	

=== 4 x 100 meters relay ===
Final – 9 August

Rank	Nation	Competitors	Time	Notes
1st place, gold medalist(s)	United States	Remonty McClain; Aaron Ernest; Christopher Royster; Diondre Batson	38.47	
2nd place, silver medalist(s)	Jamaica	Kwisi McFarlane; Tyquendo Tracey; Everton Clarke; Jazeel Murphy	38.78	
3rd place, bronze medalist(s)	Canada	Drelan Bramwell; Benjamin Williams; Gregory MacNeill; James Linde	39.89	

=== 4 x 400 meters relay ===
Final – 10 August

Rank	Nation	Competitors	Time	Notes
1st place, gold medalist(s)	United States	Najee Glass; Brycen Spratling; Akeem Alexander; Vernon Norwood	3:04.34	
2nd place, silver medalist(s)	Canada	Nathan George; Devin Biocchi; Gregory MacNeill; Benjamin Ayesu-Attah	3:08.78	
3rd place, bronze medalist(s)	Costa Rica	Jocksan Morales; César Vásquez; Denovan Hernández; Gerald Drummond	3:14.29	
4	Jamaica	Marzel Miller; Kavoy Nelson; Andre Clarke; Everton Clarke	3:14.66	

== Women's results ==
=== 100 meters ===
Final – 8 August – Wind: +0.2 m/s

Rank	Name	Nationality	Time	Notes
1st place, gold medalist(s)	Cierra White	United States	11.32	
2nd place, silver medalist(s)	Katie Wise	United States	11.58	
3rd place, bronze medalist(s)	Shaina Harrison	Canada	11.70	
4	Joy Spear Chief-Morris	Canada	11.84	
5	Iza Daniela Flores	Mexico	12.09	
6	Sharolyn Joseph	Costa Rica	12.09	
7	Janelle Kelly	Jamaica	12.10	

=== 200 meters ===
Final – 10 August – Wind: +0.2 m/s

Rank	Name	Nationality	Time	Notes
1st place, gold medalist(s)	Cierra White	United States	23.05	
2nd place, silver medalist(s)	Allison Peter	United States Virgin Islands	23.47	
3rd place, bronze medalist(s)	Ashton Purvis	United States	23.86	
4	Whitney Rowe	Canada	23.97	
5	Tameran Defreitas	Canada	24.05	
6	Iza Daniela Flores	Mexico	24.20	
7	Sharolyn Joseph	Costa Rica	24.50	

=== 400 meters ===
Final – 9 August

Rank	Name	Nationality	Time	Notes
1st place, gold medalist(s)	Allison Peter	United States Virgin Islands	51.92	
2nd place, silver medalist(s)	Taylor Ellis-Watson	United States	52.05	
3rd place, bronze medalist(s)	Brianna Nelson	United States	52.95	
4	Grace Claxton	Puerto Rico	53.55	
5	Rosalie Pringle	Saint Kitts and Nevis	56.68	

=== 800 meters ===
Final – 10 August

Rank	Name	Nationality	Time	Notes
1st place, gold medalist(s)	Shelby Houlihan	United States	2:03.00	CR
2nd place, silver medalist(s)	Rachel Francois	Canada	2:03.18	
3rd place, bronze medalist(s)	Jenna Westaway	Canada	2:04.16	
4	Megan Malasarte	United States	2:04.34	
5	Rosalie Pringle	Saint Kitts and Nevis	2:18.18	

=== 1500 meters ===
Final – 8 August

Rank	Name	Nationality	Time	Notes
1st place, gold medalist(s)	Jenna Westaway	Canada	4:15.52	CR
2nd place, silver medalist(s)	Hillary Holt	United States	4:17.82	
3rd place, bronze medalist(s)	Carise Thompson	Canada	4:22.02	

=== 5000 meters ===
Final – 10 August

Rank	Name	Nationality	Time	Notes
1st place, gold medalist(s)	Erin Finn	United States	16:06.26	CR
2nd place, silver medalist(s)	Elisa Hernández	Mexico	17:11.41	

=== 10,000 meters ===
Final – 10 August

Rank	Name	Nationality	Time	Notes
1st place, gold medalist(s)	Margo Malone	United States	36:07.71	
2nd place, silver medalist(s)	Cindy Meza	Mexico	37:57.50	

=== 3000 meters steeplechase ===
Final – 9 August

Rank	Name	Nationality	Time	Notes
1st place, gold medalist(s)	Rachel Johnson	United States	9:46.79	CR
2nd place, silver medalist(s)	Maria Bernard	Canada	9:55.69	
3rd place, bronze medalist(s)	Julie-Anne Staehli	Canada	10:04.99	
4	Courtney Frerichs	United States	10:10.51	
5	Ashley Laureano	Puerto Rico	11:30.46	

=== 100 meters hurdles ===
Final – 9 August – Wind: +2.2 m/s

Rank	Name	Nationality	Time	Notes
1st place, gold medalist(s)	LeTristan Pledger	United States	13.04 w	
2nd place, silver medalist(s)	Megan Simmonds	Jamaica	13.06 w	
3rd place, bronze medalist(s)	Ashlea Maddex	Canada	13.19 w	
4	Chrisdale McCarthy	Jamaica	13.41 w	
5	Natshalie Isaac	Puerto Rico	14.09 w	
	Michelle Young	Canada	DNF	

=== 400 meters hurdles ===
Final – 10 August

Rank	Name	Nationality	Time	Notes
1st place, gold medalist(s)	Kiah Seymour	United States	56.35	
2nd place, silver medalist(s)	Tyler Brockington	United States	58.29	
3rd place, bronze medalist(s)	Rushell Clayton	Jamaica	1:03.68	
	Katrina Seymour	Bahamas	DNF	

=== High jump ===
Final – 8 August

Rank	Name	Nationality	Result	Notes
1st place, gold medalist(s)	Alyxandria Treasure	Canada	1.85m	
2nd place, silver medalist(s)	Shanay Briscoe	United States	1.76m	
3rd place, bronze medalist(s)	Rebecca Haworth	Canada	1.76m	
4	Deandra Daniel	Trinidad and Tobago	1.73m	
5	Ronea Saunders	United States	1.73m	

=== Pole vault ===
Final – 9 August

Rank	Name	Nationality	Result	Notes
1st place, gold medalist(s)	Sandi Morris	United States	4.40m	CR
2nd place, silver medalist(s)	Robin Bone	Canada	3.80m	
3rd place, bronze medalist(s)	Tiziana Ruiz	Mexico	3.75m	
	Kaitlin Petrillos	United States	NH	

=== Long jump ===
Final – 10 August

Rank	Name	Nationality	Result	Notes
1st place, gold medalist(s)	Shakeela Saunders	United States	6.40m (1.3 m/s)	
2nd place, silver medalist(s)	Sydney Conley	United States	5.98m (-0.9 m/s)	

=== Triple jump ===
Final – 9 August

Rank	Name	Nationality	Result	Notes
1st place, gold medalist(s)	Tori Franklin	United States	13.42m (0.6 m/s)	
2nd place, silver medalist(s)	Ivonne Rangel	Mexico	13.19m (0.5 m/s)	
3rd place, bronze medalist(s)	Ellie Ewere	United States	12.80m (0.1 m/s)	
	Allison Outerbridge	Bermuda	FOUL	

=== Shot put ===
Final – 9 August

Rank	Name	Nationality	Result	Notes
1st place, gold medalist(s)	Kelsey Card	United States	17.32m	
2nd place, silver medalist(s)	Christina Hillman	United States	17.25m	
3rd place, bronze medalist(s)	Brittany Crew	Canada	16.59m	
4	Alex Porlier Langlois	Canada	15.21m	

=== Discus throw ===
Final – 8 August

Rank	Name	Nationality	Result	Notes
1st place, gold medalist(s)	Kelsey Card	United States	53.82m	
2nd place, silver medalist(s)	Alex Collatz	United States	53.20m	
3rd place, bronze medalist(s)	Brittany Crew	Canada	49.64m	
4	Alex Porlier Langlois	Canada	46.77m	

=== Hammer throw ===
Final – 8 August

Rank	Name	Nationality	Result	Notes
1st place, gold medalist(s)	Brooke Pleger	United States	64.60m	
2nd place, silver medalist(s)	Jillian Weir	Canada	63.85m	
3rd place, bronze medalist(s)	Brittany Funk	United States	60.99m	
4	Kayla Gallagher	Canada	56.22m	
5	Keishla Luna	Puerto Rico	56.02m	

=== Javelin throw ===
Final – 10 August

Rank	Name	Nationality	Result	Notes
1st place, gold medalist(s)	Fawn Miller	United States	54.90m	
2nd place, silver medalist(s)	Hannah Carson	United States	51.96m	

=== Heptathlon ===
Final – 10 August

The highest mark recorded in each event is highlighted in yellow

Rank	Name	Nationality	100m H	HJ	SP	200m	LJ	JT	800m	Points	Notes
1st place, gold medalist(s)	Nicole Oudenaarden	Canada	14.47 (2.4); 913	1.68m 830	12.94m 723	25.36 (1.3); 854	5.71m (-0.3); 762	48.90m 839	2:23:89 771	5692	
2nd place, silver medalist(s)	Milagros Montes de Oca	Dominican Republic	14.02 (2.4); 976	1.62m 759	11.62m 636	25.36 (1.3); 854	5.48m (1.4); 694	43.03m 726	2:21:29 806	5451	
3rd place, bronze medalist(s)	Quintunya Chapman	United States	13.81 (2.4); 1005	1.56m 689	13.06m 731	24.50 (1.3); 933	5.62m (0.4); 735	28.43m 447	2:22:31 792	5332	
4	Rachel Machin	Canada	14.21 (2.4); 949	1.80m 978	10.79m 581	26.79 (1.3); 729	5.64m (-0.1); 741	35.16m 575	2:27:80 721	5274	
5	Brittany Howell	United States	13.81 (2.4); 1005	1.71m 867	11.53m 630	25.29 (1.3); 860	5.67m (0.4); 750	26.08m 403	2:29:14 704	5219	

=== 10,000 meters walk ===
Final – 8 August

Rank	Name	Nationality	Time	Notes
1st place, gold medalist(s)	Andreina Gonzales	Dominican Republic	52:12.40	
2nd place, silver medalist(s)	Molly Josephs	United States	55:48.23	

=== 4 x 100 meters relay ===
Final – 9 August

Rank	Nation	Competitors	Time	Notes
1st place, gold medalist(s)	United States	Cierra White; Katie Wise; Ebony Eutsey; Octavis Freeman	43.89	
2nd place, silver medalist(s)	Canada	Whitney Rowe; Joy Spear Chief-Morris; Tameran Defreitas; Shaina Harrison	45.19	
3rd place, bronze medalist(s)	Jamaica	Rushell Clayton; Janelle Kelly; Chrisdale McCarthy; Megan Simmonds	45.90	

=== 4 x 400 meters relay ===
Final – 10 August

Rank	Nation	Competitors	Time	Notes
1st place, gold medalist(s)	United States	Kiara Porter; Taylor Ellis-Watson; Brianna Nelson; Kala Funderburk	3:35.79	
2nd place, silver medalist(s)	Canada	Tameran Defreitas; Jenna Westaway; Ashlea Maddex; Whitney Rowe	3:53.16	
