= Balkwill =

Balkwill is a surname. Notable people with the surname include:

- Alexander Balkwill (1877–1947), Scottish footballer
- Andrew Balkwill (born 1972), Australian footballer
- Bryan Balkwill (1922–2007), English conductor
- Fran Balkwill (born 1952), English scientist
- Kelsey Balkwill (born 1992), Canadian athlete
