= Katrina Seymour-Stamps =

Bahamian athlete

Personal information
- Full name: Katrina Seymour-Stamps
- Nationality: Bahamian
- Born: Katrina Seymour; 7 January 1993 (age 33) New Providence, Bahamas
- Education: East Tennessee State University
- Height: 5 ft 7 in (170 cm)
- Weight: 135 lb (61 kg)

Sport
- Country: Bahamas
- Sport: Track and field
- Event(s): 400 meters 400 meters hurdles

Katrina Seymour-Stamps (née Seymour; born 7 January 1993) is a Bahamian athlete competing in the 400 metres and 400 metres hurdles. She competed in the 4 × 400 metres relay at the 2009 and 2015 World Championships without qualifying for the final.

== International competitions ==
Year	Competition	Venue	Position	Event	Notes
Representing the Bahamas
2009	CARIFTA Games (U17)	Vieux Fort, Saint Lucia	3rd (h)	400 m	56.03^{1}
2009	CARIFTA Games (U17)	Vieux Fort, Saint Lucia	2nd	4 × 400 m relay	3:45.61
2009	World Youth Championships	Brixen, Italy	14th (sf)	400 m	56.24
2009	World Youth Championships	Brixen, Italy	4th	Medley relay	2:09.33
2009	Pan American Junior Championships	Port of Spain, Trinidad and Tobago	–	400 m	DNF
2009	Pan American Junior Championships	Port of Spain, Trinidad and Tobago	3rd	4 × 400 m relay	3:42.17
2009	World Championships	Berlin, Germany	–	4 × 400 m relay	DQ
2010	CARIFTA Games (U20)	George Town, Cayman Islands	–	4 × 400 m relay	DQ
2010	Central American and Caribbean; Junior Championships (U20)	Santo Domingo, Dominican Republic	2nd	4 × 100 m relay	45.54
2010	Central American and Caribbean; Junior Championships (U20)	Santo Domingo, Dominican Republic	3rd	4 × 400 m relay	3:38.81
2010	World Junior Championships	Moncton, Canada	4th	4 × 400 m relay	3:33.43
2011	CARIFTA Games (U20)	Montego Bay, Jamaica	2nd	400 m hurdles	58.04
2011	CARIFTA Games (U20)	Montego Bay, Jamaica	3rd	4 × 400 m relay	3:41.05
2011	Central American and Caribbean Championships	Mayagüez, Puerto Rico	3rd	400 m hurdles	57.24
2011	Pan American Junior Championships	Miramar, United States	1st	400 m hurdles	57.87
2011	Pan American Junior Championships	Miramar, United States	3rd	4 × 400 m relay	3:42.61
2011	Pan American Games	Guadalajara, Mexico	10th (h)	400 m hurdles	60.34
2012	CARIFTA Games (U20)	Hamilton, Bermuda	4th	400 m hurdles	60.70
2012	CARIFTA Games (U20)	Hamilton, Bermuda	2nd	4 × 400 m relay	3:40.44
2014	Commonwealth Games	Glasgow, United Kingdom	19th (h)	400 m hurdles	61.34
2014	Commonwealth Games	Glasgow, United Kingdom	6th	4 × 100 m relay	44.25
2014	NACAC U23 Championships	Kamloops, Canada	–	400 m hurdles	DNF
2014	Central American and Caribbean Games	Xalapa, Mexico	9th (h)	400 m hurdles	59.89
2015	IAAF World Relays	Nassau, Bahamas	3rd (B)	4 × 400 m relay	3:35.01
2015	Pan American Games	Toronto, Canada	5th	4 × 400 m relay	3:31.60
2015	NACAC Championships	San José, Costa Rica	11th (h)	400 m hurdles	58.47
2015	NACAC Championships	San José, Costa Rica	3rd	4 × 400 m relay	3:31.80
2015	World Championships	Beijing, China	10th (h)	4 × 400 m relay	3:28.46
2018	Commonwealth Games	Gold Coast, Australia	9th (h)	400 m hurdles	55.69
2018	Central American and Caribbean Games	Barranquilla, Colombia	11th (h)	400 m hurdles	58.37
2018	NACAC Championships	Toronto, Canada	9th (h)	400 m hurdles	57.79
2019	Pan American Games	Lima, Peru	14th (h)	400 m hurdles	60.71
2025	NACAC Championships	Freeport, Bahamas	9th (h)	400 m hurdles	58.49

^{1}Disqualified in the final

== Personal bests ==
Outdoor

- 400 metres – 54.89 (Clermont 2009)
- 400 metres hurdles – 55.69 (Gold Coast 2017) NR
