= Allison Peter =

Virgin Islands sprinter (born 1992)

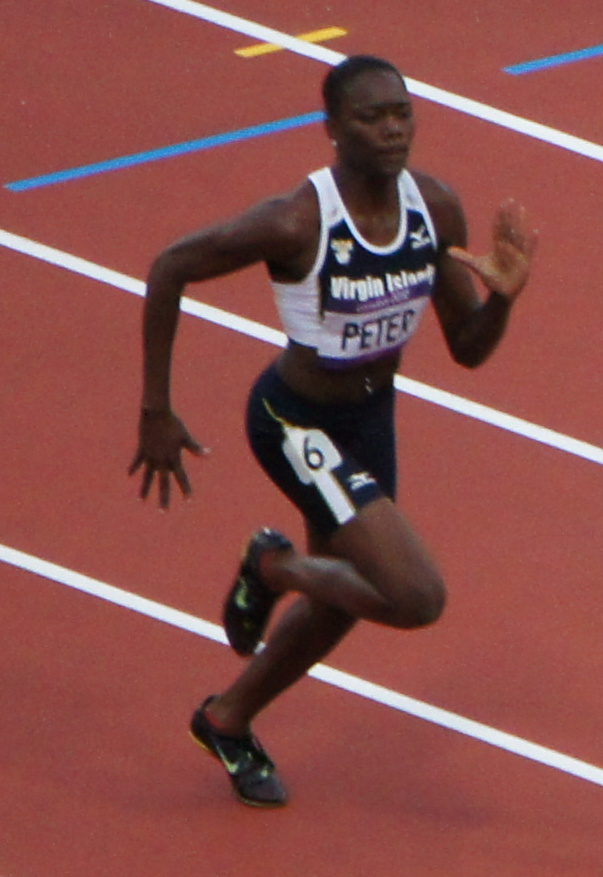
- Allison Peter at the 2012 Olympics

Personal information
- Full name: Allison Pauline Peter
- Born: 4 July 1992 (age 33) Christiansted, United States Virgin Islands
- Height: 1.73 m (5 ft 8 in)
- Weight: 59 kg (130 lb)

Sport
- Country: United States Virgin Islands
- Sport: Athletics
- Event: Sprint
- Updated on 29 December 2014

Allison Pauline Peter (born 4 July 1992) is a Virgin Islands sprinter. At the 2012 Summer Olympics, she competed in the Women's 100 metres and the Women's 200 metres.

Peter competed for the Texas Longhorns track and field team in the NCAA.

== Personal bests ==
| Event | Result | Venue | Date |
Outdoor
| 100 m | 11.17 s (wind: +1.9 m/s) | Manhattan, United States | 13 May 2012 |
| 200 m | 22.77 s (wind: +0.2 m/s) | Manhattan, United States | 12 May 2012 |
| 400 m | 51.92 s | Kamloops, Canada | 9 Aug 2014 |
Indoor
| 60 m | 7.40 s | Houston, United States | 28 Jan 2012 |
| 200 m | 22.95 s | Nampa, United States | 9 Mar 2012 |

== Achievements ==
| Year | Competition | Venue | Position | Event | Notes |
Representing the United States Virgin Islands
| 2007 | CARIFTA Games (U17) | Providenciales, Turks and Caicos Islands | 8th | 100 m | 12.67 (wind: +0.5 m/s) |
| 2007 | CARIFTA Games (U17) | Providenciales, Turks and Caicos Islands | 5th (h) | 200 m | 25.19 w (wind: +2.6 m/s) |
| 2007 | World Youth Championships | Ostrava, Czech Republic | 6th (qf) | 100 m | 12.21 (wind: -1.2 m/s) |
| 2007 | World Youth Championships | Ostrava, Czech Republic | 4th (sf) | 200 m | 24.48 (wind: -1.8 m/s) |
| 2008 | CARIFTA Games (U17) | Basseterre, Saint Kitts and Nevis | 2nd | 100 m | 11.91 (wind: +0.4 m/s) |
| 2008 | CARIFTA Games (U17) | Basseterre, Saint Kitts and Nevis | 1st | 200 m | 23.99 (wind: +1.6 m/s) |
| 2008 | World Junior Championships | Bydgoszcz, Poland | 41st (h) | 100m | 12.16 (wind: -0.8 m/s) |
| 2008 | World Junior Championships | Bydgoszcz, Poland | 33rd (h) | 200m | 24.61 (wind: +0.2 m/s) |
| 2009 | CARIFTA Games (U20) | Vieux Fort, Saint Lucia | 3rd | 100 m | 11.50 w (wind: +2.5 m/s) |
| 2009 | CARIFTA Games (U20) | Vieux Fort, Saint Lucia | 3rd | 200 m | 23.51 (wind: +1.5 m/s) |
| 2009 | World Youth Championship | Bressanone, Italy | 2nd | 100 m | 11.47 (wind: +0.7 m/s) |
| 2009 | World Youth Championship | Bressanone, Italy | 2nd | 200 m | 23.08 (wind: +0.9 m/s) |
| 2010 | CARIFTA Games (U20) | George Town, Cayman Islands | 2nd | 100 m | 11.51 (wind: +0.7 m/s) |
| 2010 | CARIFTA Games (U20) | George Town, Cayman Islands | 1st | 200 m | 23.29 (wind: +0.5 m/s) |
| 2010 | Central American and Caribbean Junior Championships (U20) | Santo Domingo, Dominican Republic | 1st | 200 m | 23.32 (wind: -1.3 m/s) |
| 2010 | World Junior Championships | Moncton, Canada | 7th | 200 m | 23.70 (wind: -0.5 m/s) |
| 2011 | Central American and Caribbean Championships | Mayagüez, Puerto Rico | 16th (h) | 100 m | 12.05 (wind: -1.4 m/s) |
| 2011 | Central American and Caribbean Championships | Mayagüez, Puerto Rico | 4th | 200 m | 23.25 (wind: +1.4 m/s) |
| 2011 | Pan American Junior Championships | Miramar, United States | 4th | 200 m | 23.25 (wind: +2.0 m/s) |
| 2011 | World Championships | Daegu, South Korea | 21st (sf) | 200 m | 23.56 (wind: -0.1 m/s) |
| 2012 | NACAC Under-23 Championships | Irapuato, Mexico | 2nd | 200 m | 22.92 A (wind: +0.9 m/s) |
| 2012 | Olympic Games | London, United Kingdom | 7th (h) | 100 m | 11.41 w (wind: +2.2 m/s) |
| 2012 | Olympic Games | London, United Kingdom | 8th (sf) | 200 m | 23.35 (wind: +1.0 m/s) |
| 2014 | NACAC Under-23 Championships | Kamloops, Canada | 2nd | 200 m | 23.47 (wind: +0.2 m/s) |
| 2014 | NACAC Under-23 Championships | Kamloops, Canada | 1st | 400 m | 51.92 |
| 2014 | Pan American Sports Festival | Mexico City, Mexico | 2nd | 200m | 23.03 w A (wind: +2.1 m/s) |
| 2014 | Central American and Caribbean Games | Xalapa, Mexico | 3rd | 200m | 23.54 A (wind: -1.6 m/s) |
