= Athletics at the 2017 Summer Universiade – Men's 400 metres =

The men's 400 metres event at the 2017 Summer Universiade was held on 23, 24 and 25 August at the Taipei Municipal Stadium.

== Medalists ==
Gold	Silver	Bronze
Luguelín Santos; Dominican Republic	Yoandys Lescay; Cuba	Rafał Omelko; Poland

== Results ==
=== Heats ===
Qualification: First 2 in each heat (Q) and next 6 fastest (q) qualified for the semifinals.

Rank	Heat	Name	Nationality	Time	Notes
1	1	Rafał Omelko	Poland	46.77	Q
2	8	Nathaniel George	Canada	46.91	Q
3	1	Mikhail Litvin	Kazakhstan	46.92	Q, SB
4	8	Mateo Ružić	Croatia	46.93	Q
5	7	Zakithi Nene	South Africa	46.97	Q
6	7	Othman Al-Busaidi	Oman	47.05	Q, PB
7	5	Yoandys Lescay	Cuba	47.06	Q
8	8	Li Runyu	China	47.14	q
9	3	Darren Alfred	Trinidad and Tobago	47.18	Q
10	1	Jan Tesař	Czech Republic	47.22	q
11	2	Luguelín Santos	Dominican Republic	47.34	Q
11	3	Daniele Angelella	Switzerland	47.34	Q
13	2	Silvan Lutz	Switzerland	47.40	Q
14	6	Luis Charles	Dominican Republic	47.42	Q
15	5	Denis Danáč	Slovakia	47.50	Q
16	9	Kajetan Duszyński	Poland	47.57	Q
17	5	Batuhan Altıntaş	Turkey	47.59	q
18	9	Benjamin Ayesu-Attah	Canada	47.65	Q
19	1	Bienvenu Sawadogo	Burkina Faso	47.69	q
19	9	Ibrahima Mbengue	Senegal	47.69	q
21	9	Ayodeji Akinkuowo	Nigeria	47.69	q, PB
22	3	Takamasa Kitagawa	Japan	47.85	
23	4	Davide Re	Italy	47.87	Q
24	2	Yang Lung-hsiang	Chinese Taipei	47.95	
25	6	Daniele Corsa	Italy	47.97	Q
26	4	Jordan Clarke	United States	48.02	Q
27	8	Cliffton Meshack	Botswana	48.03	
28	8	Abdelrahman Abualhummos	Jordan	48.16	PB
29	3	Andrey Sokolov	Kazakhstan	48.19	
30	1	Rokas Pacevičius	Lithuania	48.27	
31	6	Duncan Agyemang	Ghana	48.53	
32	5	Anchois Aron	Malaysia	48.56	
33	3	Daniel Bingi	Uganda	48.57	
34	6	Kwong Kar Jun	Malaysia	48.65	
35	4	Charles Shimukowa	Zambia	48.72	
36	7	Benson Okot	Uganda	48.87	
37	4	Yang Zeping	China	49.03	
38	7	Wijesundara Mudiyanselage	Sri Lanka	49.06	
39	4	Sten Ütsmüts	Estonia	49.20	SB
40	5	Mohammed Mahnashi	Saudi Arabia	49.22	SB
41	1	Tan Zong Yang	Singapore	49.25	SB
42	4	Umar Sadat	Pakistan	49.27	
43	2	Pankaj Malik	India	49.61	
44	2	Isaac Olumbe	Kenya	49.66	
45	3	Obrey Chabala	Zambia	49.80	
46	8	Jakob Goroško	Estonia	49.81	
47	2	Lim Hyoung-bin	South Korea	49.97	
48	2	Disanayaka Mudiyanselage	Sri Lanka	50.02	
49	6	Usama Al-Gheilani	Oman	50.04	
50	5	Luis Iriarte	Peru	50.05	
51	4	Jan Jamnik	Slovenia	50.19	
52	9	Krištof Knap	Slovenia	50.83	
53	7	Malek Chatila	Lebanon	51.08	
54	8	Musaad Ahmed Bali	Saudi Arabia	51.53	
55	9	Ilvars Ieviņš	Latvia	51.65	
56	6	Rasmus Jensen	Denmark	52.63	
57	3	Shukhrat Usmanov	Tajikistan	54.59	
	9	Johan Nicolai Hartling	Denmark	DNF	
	7	Amoj Jacob	India	DQ	163.3a
	7	Mohamed Islem Bekar	Algeria	DQ	163.3a
	5	Arinze Chance	Guyana	DNS	
	6	Gideon Narib	Namibia	DNS	
	8	Mmaduabuchi Ogbukwo	Nigeria	DNS	
	9	Alimamy Kamara	Sierra Leone	DNS	

=== Semifinals ===
Qualification: First 2 in each heat (Q) and the next 2 fastest (q) qualified for the final.

Rank	Heat	Name	Nationality	Time	Notes
1	1	Luguelín Santos	Dominican Republic	45.85	Q
2	2	Yoandys Lescay	Cuba	46.02	Q, SB
3	2	Benjamin Ayesu-Attah	Canada	46.23	Q, SB
4	1	Kajetan Duszyński	Poland	46.30	Q, PB
5	2	Davide Re	Italy	46.32	q
6	2	Mikhail Litvin	Kazakhstan	46.40	q, SB
7	1	Nathaniel George	Canada	46.47	
8	2	Zakithi Nene	South Africa	46.55	
9	1	Daniele Corsa	Italy	46.56	
10	3	Rafał Omelko	Poland	46.73	Q
11	1	Jan Tesař	Czech Republic	46.77	SB
12	2	Batuhan Altıntaş	Turkey	46.86	
13	1	Silvan Lutz	Switzerland	46.89	
14	1	Mateo Ružić	Croatia	46.90	
15	3	Darren Alfred	Trinidad and Tobago	47.15	Q
16	3	Othman Al-Busaidi	Oman	47.20	
17	3	Luis Charles	Dominican Republic	47.33	
18	3	Li Runyu	China	47.53	
19	1	Ibrahima Mbengue	Senegal	47.61	
20	3	Ayodeji Akinkuowo	Nigeria	47.75	
21	3	Daniele Angelella	Switzerland	47.75	
22	3	Jordan Clarke	United States	47.76	
23	2	Denis Danáč	Slovakia	47.82	
24	2	Bienvenu Sawadogo	Burkina Faso	48.15	

=== Final ===
Official Video

Rank	Lane	Name	Nationality	Time	Notes
1st place, gold medalist(s)	3	Luguelín Santos	Dominican Republic	45.24	SB
2nd place, silver medalist(s)	5	Yoandys Lescay	Cuba	45.31	SB
3rd place, bronze medalist(s)	4	Rafał Omelko	Poland	45.56	
4	7	Kajetan Duszyński	Poland	46.50	
5	6	Benjamin Ayesu-Attah	Canada	46.53	
6	1	Davide Re	Italy	46.87	
7	2	Mikhail Litvin	Kazakhstan	46.93	
8	8	Darren Alfred	Trinidad and Tobago	47.93	
