= 2014 NACAC U23 Championships in Athletics =

VIII NACAC Under-23 Championships in Athletics
- Dates: August 8–10
- Host city: Kamloops, British Columbia, Canada
- Venue: Hillside Stadium
- Level: U-23
- Events: 44
- Participation: 197 athletes from 19 nations

The 8th NACAC Under-23 Championships in Athletics were held at the Hillside Stadium in Kamloops, British Columbia, Canada from August 8–10, 2014. A total of 44 track and field events were contested, divided evenly between the sexes.

== Medal summary ==
For medal winners and complete results, see footnote

=== Men ===
Event	Gold		Silver		Bronze	
100 metres (wind: +0.2 m/s)	Diondre Batson; United States	10.08	Tyquendo Tracey; Jamaica	10.21	Trevorvano Mackey; Bahamas	10.30
200 metres (wind: +1.5 m/s)	Remontay McClain; United States	20.32	Trevorvano Mackey; Bahamas	20.46	Everton Clarke; Jamaica	20.51
400 metres	Brycen Spratling; United States	45.18	Bralon Taplin; Grenada	45.52	Vernon Norwood; United States	45.56
800 metres	Bryan Martínez; Mexico	1:47.90	Thomas Riva; Canada	1:48.19	Christopher Low; United States	1:48.46
1500 metres	Matthew Hillenbrand; United States	3:54.85	Connor Darlington; Canada	3:55.36	Edgar Alan García; Mexico	3:55.67
5000 metres	Edgar Alan García; Mexico	14:35.00	Christopher Bendtsen; United States	15:17.80	Juan Francisco Félix; Dominican Republic	15:39.41
10000 metres	Christopher Bendtsen; United States	31:43.37	Christopher Enriquez; United States	31:47.77	Kenneth Robles; Costa Rica	33:51.53
3000 metres steeplechase	Christopher Dulhanty; Canada	8:56.60	Mason Ferlic; United States	9:04.78	Edward Owens; United States	9:18.87
110 metres hurdles (wind: +2.1 m/s)	Eddie Lovett; U.S. Virgin Islands	13.39 w	Vincent Wyatt; United States	13.55 w	Gregory MacNeill; Canada	13.83 w
400 metres hurdles	Trevor Brown; United States	49.92	Michael Stigler; United States	49.98	Gerald Drummond; Costa Rica	51.05
High jump	Ryan Ingraham; Bahamas	2.28m CR	Dakarai Hightower; United States	2.10m	Domanique Missick; Turks and Caicos Islands	2.00m
Pole vault	Jacob Blankenship; United States	5.50m	Chase Wolfle; United States	5.20m	Víctor Manuel Castillero; Mexico	4.80m
Long jump	Braxton Drummond; United States	7.64m (wind: +1.1 m/s)	Devin Field; United States	7.51m (wind: +1.7 m/s)	Sedeekie Edie; Jamaica	7.41m (wind: +1.3 m/s)
Triple jump	Eric Sloan; United States	16.20m (wind: +0.1 m/s)	Steve Waithe; Trinidad and Tobago	15.94m (wind: +1.2 m/s)	Lathone Collie-Minns; Bahamas	15.86m (wind: +1.0 m/s)
Shot put	Willy Irwin; United States	19.44m	Darrell Hill; United States	18.85m	Akeem Stewart; Trinidad and Tobago	17.76m
Discus throw	Rodney Brown; United States	63.34m CR	Tavis Bailey; United States	57.37m	Jordan Young; Canada	53.42m
Hammer throw	Diego del Real; Mexico	69.42m	Matthias Tayala; United States	68.93m	Adam Keenan; Canada	68.35m
Javelin throw	Michael Shuey; United States	76.02m	David Ocampo; Mexico	75.28m	Raymond Dykstra; Canada	73.63m
Decathlon	James Turner; Canada	7536 pts CR	Soloman Ijah; United States	6993 pts	Kale Wolken; United States	3080 pts
20,000 metres track walk	Benjamin Thorne; Canada	1:29:08.64	Emmanuel Corvera; United States	1:31:30.86	Alejandro Chavez; United States	1:33:26.31
4 x 100 metres relay	United States; Remontay McClain; Aaron Ernest; Christopher Royster; Diondre Batson	38.47	Jamaica; Kwisi McFarlane; Tyquendo Tracey; Everton Clarke; Jazeel Murphy	38.78	Canada; Drelan Bramwell; Benjamin Williams; Gregory MacNeill; James Linde	39.89
4 x 400 metres relay	United States; Najee Glass; Brycen Spratling; Akeem Alexander; Vernon Norwood	3:04.34	Canada; Nathan George; Devin Biocchi; Gregory MacNeill; Benjamin Ayesu-Attah	3:08.78	Costa Rica; Jocksan Morales; César Vásquez; Denovan Hernández; Gerald Drummond	3:14.29

=== Women ===
Event	Gold		Silver		Bronze	
100 metres (wind: +0.2 m/s)	Cierra White; United States	11.32	Katie Wise; United States	11.58	Shaina Harrison; Canada	11.70
200 metres (wind: +0.2 m/s)	Cierra White; United States	23.05	Allison Peter; U.S. Virgin Islands	23.47	Ashton Purvis; United States	23.86
400 metres	Allison Peter; U.S. Virgin Islands	51.92	Taylor Ellis-Watson; United States	52.05	Brianna Nelson; United States	52.95
800 metres	Shelby Houlihan; United States	2:03.00 CR	Rachel Francois; Canada	2:03.18	Jenna Westaway; Canada	2:04.16
1500 metres	Jenna Westaway; Canada	4:15.52 CR	Hillary Holt; United States	4:17.82	Carise Thompson; Canada	4:22.02
5000 metres	Erin Finn; United States	16:06.26 CR	Elisa Hernández; Mexico	17:11.41		
10000 metres	Margo Malone; United States	36:07.71	Cindy Meza; Mexico	37:57.50		
3000 metres steeplechase	Rachel Johnson; United States	9:46.79 CR	Maria Bernard; Canada	9:55.69	Julie-Anne Staehli; Canada	10:04.99
100 metres hurdles (wind: +2.2 m/s)	LeTristan Pledger; United States	13.04 w	Megan Simmonds; Jamaica	13.06 w	Ashlea Maddex; Canada	13.19 w
400 metres hurdles	Kiah Seymour; United States	56.35	Tyler Brockington; United States	58.29	Rushell Clayton; Jamaica	1:03.68
High jump	Alyxandria Treasure; Canada	1.85m	Shanay Briscoe; United States	1.76m	Rebecca Haworth; Canada	1.76m
Pole vault	Sandi Morris; United States	4.40m CR	Robin Bone; Canada	3.80m	Tiziana Ruiz; Mexico	3.75m
Long jump	Shakeela Saunders; United States	6.40m (wind: +1.3 m/s)	Sydney Conley; United States	5.98m (wind: -0.9 m/s)		
Triple jump	Tori Franklin; United States	13.42m (wind: +0.6 m/s)	Ivonne Rangel; Mexico	13.19m (wind: +0.5 m/s)	Ellie Ewere; United States	12.80m (wind: +0.1 m/s)
Shot put	Kelsey Card; United States	17.32m	Christina Hillman; United States	17.25m	Brittany Crew; Canada	16.59m
Discus throw	Kelsey Card; United States	53.82m	Alex Collatz; United States	53.20m	Brittany Crew; Canada	49.64m
Hammer throw	Brooke Pleger; United States	64.60m	Jillian Weir; Canada	63.85m	Brittany Funk; United States	60.99m
Javelin throw	Fawn Miller; United States	54.90m	Hannah Carson; United States	51.96m		
Heptathlon	Nicole Oudenaarden; Canada	5692 pts	Milagros Montes de Oca; Dominican Republic	5451 pts	Quintunya Chapman; United States	5332 pts
10,000 metres track walk	Andreina Gonzales; Dominican Republic	52:12.40	Molly Josephs; United States	55:48.23		
4 x 100 metres relay	United States; Cierra White; Katie Wise; Ebony Eutsey; Octavis Freeman	43.89	Canada; Whitney Rowe; Joy Spear Chief-Morris; Tameran Defreitas; Shaina Harrison	45.19	Jamaica; Rushell Clayton; Janelle Kelly; Chrisdale McCarthy; Megan Simmonds	45.90
4 x 400 metres relay	United States; Kiara Porter; Taylor Ellis-Watson; Brianna Nelson; Kala Funderburk	3:35.79	Canada; Tameran Defreitas; Jenna Westaway; Ashlea Maddex; Whitney Rowe	3:53.16		

== Medal table (unofficial) ==
* Host nation (Canada)

Rank	Nation	Gold	Silver	Bronze	Total
1	United States (USA)	31	23	10	64
2	Canada (CAN)*	6	9	13	28
3	Mexico (MEX)	3	4	3	10
4	U.S. Virgin Islands (VIR)	2	1	0	3
5	Bahamas (BAH)	1	1	2	4
6	Dominican Republic (DOM)	1	1	1	3
7	Jamaica (JAM)	0	3	4	7
8	Trinidad and Tobago (TTO)	0	1	1	2
9	Grenada (GRN)	0	1	0	1
10	Costa Rica (CRC)	0	0	3	3
11	Turks and Caicos Islands (TKS)	0	0	1	1
Totals (11 entries)		44	44	38	126

== Participation ==
According to an unofficial count, 197 athletes from 19 countries participated.

- Anguilla (1)
- Bahamas (5)
- Barbados (3)
- Bermuda (2)
- British Virgin Islands (1)
- Canada (37)
- Costa Rica (9)
- Dominican Republic (4)
- Grenada (4)
- Jamaica (15)
- Mexico (14)
- Montserrat (2)
- Puerto Rico (10)
- Saint Kitts and Nevis (2)
- Saint Vincent and the Grenadines (1)
- Trinidad and Tobago (5)
- Turks and Caicos Islands (2)
- United States (77)
- U.S. Virgin Islands (3)
