= Jenna Westaway =

Canadian middle-distance runner

Personal information
- Full name: Jenna Rae Eilee Westaway
- Nationality: Canadian
- Born: 19 June 1994 (age 31)
- Education: University of Calgary

Sport
- Sport: Track and field
- Event: 800m

Jenna Rae Eilee Westaway (born 19 June 1994) is a Canadian middle-distance runner. She competed in the 800 metres event at the 2014 IAAF World Indoor Championships and 2018 IAAF World Indoor Championships.

== Competition record ==
Year	Competition	Venue	Position	Event	Notes
Representing Canada
2011	World Youth Championships	Villeneuve d'Ascq, France	7th (h)	800 m	2:15.34
2013	Pan American Junior Championships	Medellín, Colombia	1st	800 m	2:06.94
2013	Pan American Junior Championships	Medellín, Colombia	2nd	4 × 400 m relay	3:41.53
2014	World Indoor Championships	Sopot, Poland	14th (h)	800 m	2:03.52
2014	NACAC U-23 Championships	Kamloops, British Columbia, Canada	3rd	800 m	2:04.16
2014	NACAC U-23 Championships	Kamloops, British Columbia, Canada	1st	1500 m	4:15.52
2014	NACAC U-23 Championships	Kamloops, British Columbia, Canada	2nd	4 × 400 m relay	3:53.16
2016	NACAC U-23 Championships	San Salvador, El Salvador	2nd	800 m	2:03.90
2016	NACAC U-23 Championships	San Salvador, El Salvador	1st	1500 m	4:16.03
2016	NACAC U-23 Championships	San Salvador, El Salvador	3rd	4 × 400 m relay	3:44.45
2017	Universiade	Taipei, Taiwan	11th (sf)	800 m	2:04.59
2017	Universiade	Taipei, Taiwan	4th	4 × 400 m relay	3:36.44
2018	World Indoor Championship	Birmingham, United Kingdom	12th (h)	800 m	2:03.91
2019	Universiade	Naples, Italy	5th	800 m	2:02.65
2019	Universiade	Naples, Italy	5th	4 × 400 m relay	3:34.62
