= Nathan George (sprinter) =

Canadian athlete

Personal information
- Nationality: Canadian
- Born: 7 January 1994 (age 32)

Sport
- Sport: Athletics
- Event: Sprint

Achievements and titles
- Personal best(s): 60m: 6.91s (2014); 100m: 10.75s (2019); 200m: 20.99s (2022); 400m: 45.54s (2022)
Medal record
Men's Athletics
Representing Canada
NACAC U-23 Championships
Silver medal – second place	2014 Kamloops	4×400 m relay

Nathan George (born 7 January 1994) is a Canadian sprinter. He is a two-time Canadian champion over 400 metres.

== Biography ==
George was a silver medalist competing for Canada in the men's 4 x 400 metres relay at the 2014 NACAC U23 Championships. He won a gold medal at the 2016 Canadian University Indoor Track and Field Championships competing for Trinity Western University over 300 metres, ahead of Bismark Boateng and Rayshaun Franklin, becoming the first athlete in school history to win a men’s CIS gold medal, and set a school record running 33.52 seconds.

Later a member of the Coquitlam Cheetahs, he ran a 45.94 seconds personal best at the 2016 Canadian Track and Field championships. He became Canadian champion over 400 metres again in 2022, lowering his personal best to 45.54 seconds.

He was selected for the Canadian relay pool for the 2025 World Athletics Relays in China in May 2025, helping the mixed 4 x 400 metres team qualify for the upcoming world championships, running alongside Austin Cole, Lauren Gale and Zoe Sherar. George placed second over 400 metres to Christopher Morales Williams at the 2025 Canadian Athletics Championships in August 2025, running a time of 46.25 seconds. George was a member of the Canadian team for the 2025 World Championships in Tokyo, Japan.

He was selected as part of the Canadian team for the 2026 World Athletics Relays, and ran in the mixed 4 x 400 metres relay with the team running a national record time of 3:12.43.
