= Rodney Brown (athlete) =

American discus thrower

Personal information
- Born: May 21, 1993 (age 33) Chappell Hill, Texas, United States
- Height: 6 ft 0 in (183 cm)

Sport
- Sport: Track and field
- Event: Discus throw
- College team: Louisiana State University
Medal record
Men's athletics
Representing the United States
NACAC Under-23 Championships
Gold medal – first place	2014 Kamloops	Discus throw
- Updated on January 24, 2017

Rodney Andrey Brown (born May 21, 1993, in Chappell Hill, Texas) is an American track and field athlete specializing in the discus throw. He competed at the 2015 World Championships in Beijing without recording a valid throw. Earlier he won the gold medal at the 2014 NACAC U23 Championships.

His personal best in the event is 66.00 metres set at the Mt. SAC Relays held in Norwalk, California in 2016. He holds the Louisiana State University school record at 65.06 meters set at the Penn Relays in 2015.

== Competition record ==
Year	Competition	Venue	Position	Event	Notes
Representing the United States
2012	World Junior Championships	Barcelona, Spain	18th (q)	Discus throw (1.75 kg)	54.66 m
2014	NACAC U23 Championships	Kamloops, Canada	1st	Discus throw	63.34 m
2015	World Championships	Beijing, China	–	Discus throw	NM
2017	World Championships	London, United Kingdom	–	Discus throw	NM

== See also ==
- United States at the 2015 World Championships in Athletics
