= Everton Clarke =

Jamaican sprinter

Personal information
- Born: 24 December 1992 (age 33) Trelawny, Jamaica

Sport
- Sport: Athletics
- Event(s): 100 m, 200 m
- Coached by: Maurice Wilson
Medal record
Men's Athletics
Representing Jamaica
Commonwealth Games
| Bronze medal – third place | 2018 Gold Coast | 4x100 m |

Everton Clarke (born 24 December 1992) is a Jamaican sprinter. He represented his country in the 60 metres at the 2018 World Indoor Championships reaching the semifinals. He also was part of the Jamaican 4x100 m team to win bronze at the 2018 Commonwealth Games.

== International competitions ==
| Year | Competition | Venue | Position | Event | Notes |
Representing Jamaica
| 2014 | NACAC U23 Championships | Kamloops, Canada | 3rd | 200 m | 20.51 |
| 2014 | NACAC U23 Championships | Kamloops, Canada | 2nd | 4 × 100 m relay | 38.78 |
| 2014 | NACAC U23 Championships | Kamloops, Canada | 4th | 4 × 400 m relay | 3:14.66 |
| 2017 | World Relays | Nassau, Bahamas | – | 4 × 100 m relay | DNF |
| 2018 | World Indoor Championships | Birmingham, United Kingdom | 11th (sf) | 60 m | 6.63 |
| 2018 | Commonwealth Games | Gold Coast, Australia | 3rd | 4 × 100 m | 38.35 |

== Personal bests ==
Outdoor

- 100 metres – 10.08 (+0.4 m/s, Kingston 2016)
- 200 metres – 20.45 (+1.0 m/s, Kingston 2016)

Indoor

- 60 metres – 6.54 (Karlsruhe 2018)
