= Jacob Blankenship =

American pole vaulter (born 1994)

Personal information
- Born: 15 March 1994 (age 32) Blacklick, Ohio, United States

Sport
- Sport: Track and field
- Event: Pole vault
Medal record
Representing United States
Pan American Games
Bronze medal – third place	2015 Toronto	Pole vault
World Youth Championships
Bronze medal – third place	2011 Lille	Pole vault

Jacob "Jake" Blankenship (born March 15, 1994) is an American track and field athlete who competes in the pole vault. He holds a personal record of 5.80 m (19 ft 1/4 in) for the event, set in 2015. He placed third at the USA Outdoor Track and Field Championships in 2015.

Blankenship won medals at the World Youth Championships in Athletics in 2011 and NACAC Under-23 Championships in Athletics in 2014. He represents Tennessee Volunteers team collegiately and has had top three finishes both indoors and outdoors in NCAA competition, including winning the 2016 Outdoor Championships.

== Career ==
From Blacklick, Ohio, he attended Gahanna Lincoln High School. While there he established a reputation in the pole vault, setting Ohio state records both indoors and outdoors. He gained the William H. Suddarth Athletic Scholarship for his efforts and reached the podium on his international debut, taking the bronze at the 2011 World Youth Championships in Athletics.

He went on to study at the University of Tennessee in 2012 and began to compete collegiately for their Tennessee Volunteers team. Despite being a freshman, he quickly proved himself among the top collegiate vaulters in the United States, with a runner-up finish at the Southeastern Conference indoor championships and then a new personal record of 5.60 m (18 ft 4 1/4 in) for fourth at the NCAA Men's Indoor Track and Field Championships. In his first outdoor meet of the 2013 season, he set an absolute best of 5.61 m (18 ft 4 3/4 in) to place fourth at the Texas Relays. He won the Penn Relays meet, but performed less well at the main championships that year, coming fifth at the SEC event and 15th at the NCAA Men's Outdoor Track and Field Championships.

Blankenship missed most of the 2014 indoor season, but returned to form outdoors with a win at the Penn Relays and a new personal record of 5.64 m (18 ft 6 in) to place second at the SEC Championships. He made his first podium at the NCAA Outdoor Championships, placing third. He entered the 2014 USA Outdoor Track and Field Championships, but failed to record a valid height. He went unmatched at the 2014 NACAC Under-23 Championships in Athletics, however, easily taking the gold medal some thirty centimeters ahead of compatriot Chase Wolfle.

Heading into his third year for the Tennessee Volunteers, he had runner-up placings at both the SEC and 2015 NCAA Indoor Championships, being beaten at the latter competition only by an American collegiate record performance by Shawnacy Barber. Blankenship improved his best to 5.80 m (19 ft 1/4 in) – a mark which ranked him in the top ten athletes indoors globally for the season. He matched that best outdoors at the Texas Relays later two weeks later, again losing to Barber. He then had a string of wins, including the Penn Relays and SEC Outdoor Championships (his first conference title). This was streak was broken at the 2015 NCAA Outdoor Championships, where he was some forty centimeters off his best and finished in sixth.

Blankenship established himself at the top national level at the 2015 USA Outdoor Track and Field Championships, taking third place in the open event behind Sam Kendricks and Brad Walker.

== Personal bests ==
- Pole vault outdoor – 5.80 m (19 ft 1/4 in) (2015)
- Pole vault indoor – 5.80 m (19 ft 1/4 in) (2015)

== International competitions ==
Year	Competition	Venue	Position	Notes
2011	World Youth Championships	Lille, France	3rd	5.05 m
2014	NACAC U23 Championships	Kamloops, Canada	1st	5.50 m
2015	Pan American Games	Toronto, Canada	3rd	5.40 m
2015	World Championships	Beijing, China	27th (q)	5.55 m
