= Alyxandria Treasure =

Canadian high jumper (born 1992)

Personal information
- Born: May 15, 1992 (age 34) Prince George, British Columbia
- Height: 175 cm (5 ft 9 in)
- Weight: 63.5 kg (140 lb)

Sport
- Country: Canada
- Sport: Athletics
- Event: High jump

Achievements and titles
- Personal best: 1.94m

Alyxandria Treasure (born May 15, 1992 in Prince George, British Columbia) is a Canadian track and field athlete competing in the high jump. She competed in the high jump event at the 2015 Pan American Games in Toronto, where she finished 7th.

In 2016, she jumped her personal best of 1.93, thereby qualifying for the Olympic team. She placed 17th in the Rio de Janeiro Olympics.

Treasure was an All-American jumper for the Kansas State Wildcats track and field team, finishing runner-up in the high jump at the 2014 NCAA Division I Outdoor Track and Field Championships.

== Personal best ==
Event	Result	Venue	Date
Outdoor
High jump	1.94 m	(Brazil) Rio de Janeiro	18 August 2016
Indoor
High jump	1.90 m	(United States) Ann Arbor	16 February 2018

== Achievements ==
Year	Competition	Venue	Position	Event	Notes
Representing Canada
2010	World Junior Championships	Moncton, Canada	29th (q)	High jump	1.70 m
2011	Pan American Junior Championships	Miramar, United States	2nd	High jump	1.80 m
2014	NACAC U-23 Championships	Kamloops, Canada	1st	High jump	1.85 m
2015	Pan American Games	Toronto, Canada	7th	High jump	1.85 m
2016	Olympic Games	Rio de Janeiro, Brazil	17th	High jump	1.88 m
2017	World Championships	London, Great Britain	21st (q)	High jump	1.85 m
2018	Commonwealth Games	Gold Coast, Australia	4th	High jump	1.91 m
2018	NACAC Championships	Toronto, Canada	–	High jump	NM

Sporting positions
Preceded by (Canada) Michelle Kinsella	Women's Canadian National Champion; 2014-2018	Succeeded by Emma Kimoto
Preceded by (United States) Tynita Butts	NACAC Under-23 High jump Champion; 2014	Succeeded by (Barbados) Akela Jones
