= Benjamin Ayesu-Attah =

Canadian sprinter

Personal information
- Born: 28 April 1993 (age 33) Saint-Isidore, Canada
- Education: University of Idaho
- Height: 1.83 m (6 ft 0 in)
- Weight: 70 kg (154 lb)

Sport
- Sport: Athletics
- Event(s): 400 metres, 200 metres
- College team: Idaho Vandals
- Club: Coquitlam Cheetahs

Benjamin Kweku Ayesu-Attah (born 28 April 1993) is a Canadian sprinter specialising in the 400 metres. He won the gold medal at the 2017 Jeux de la Francophonie.

== International competitions ==
| Year | Competition | Venue | Position | Event | Notes |
Representing Canada
| 2009 | World Youth Championships | Brixen, Italy | 18th (sf) | 400 m | 48.72 |
| 2009 | World Youth Championships | Brixen, Italy | 5th | Medley relay | 1:53.51 |
| 2012 | World Junior Championships | Barcelona, Spain | 40th (h) | 400 m | 48.08 |
| 2012 | World Junior Championships | Barcelona, Spain | 14th (h) | 4 × 400 m relay | 3:13.68 |
| 2013 | Universiade | Kazan, Russia | 14th (sf) | 400 m | 47.11 |
| 2013 | Universiade | Kazan, Russia | 1st | 4 × 400 m relay | 3:05.26 |
| 2014 | NACAC U23 Championships | Kamloops, Canada | 4th | 400 m | 47.06 |
| 2014 | NACAC U23 Championships | Kamloops, Canada | 2nd | 4 × 400 m relay | 3:08.78 |
| 2017 | IAAF World Relays | Nassau, Bahamas | 7th (B) | 4 × 400 m relay | 3:12.52 |
| 2017 | Jeux de la Francophonie | Abidjan, Ivory Coast | 1st | 400 m | 46.43 |
| 2017 | Jeux de la Francophonie | Abidjan, Ivory Coast | 4th | 4 × 400 m relay | 3:14.29 |
| 2017 | Universiade | Taipei, Taiwan | 5th | 400 m | 46.53 |
| 2017 | Universiade | Taipei, Taiwan | 6th | 4 × 400 m relay | 3:11.09 |

== Personal bests ==
Outdoor

- 200 metres – 21.31 (-0.8 m/s) (Orem 2014)
- 400 metres – 46.20 (Edmonton 2016)

Indoor

- 200 metres – 21.90 (Moscow, ID 2016)
- 400 metres – 47.23 (Albuquerque 2013)
