= 2013 in the sport of athletics =

2013 in athletics
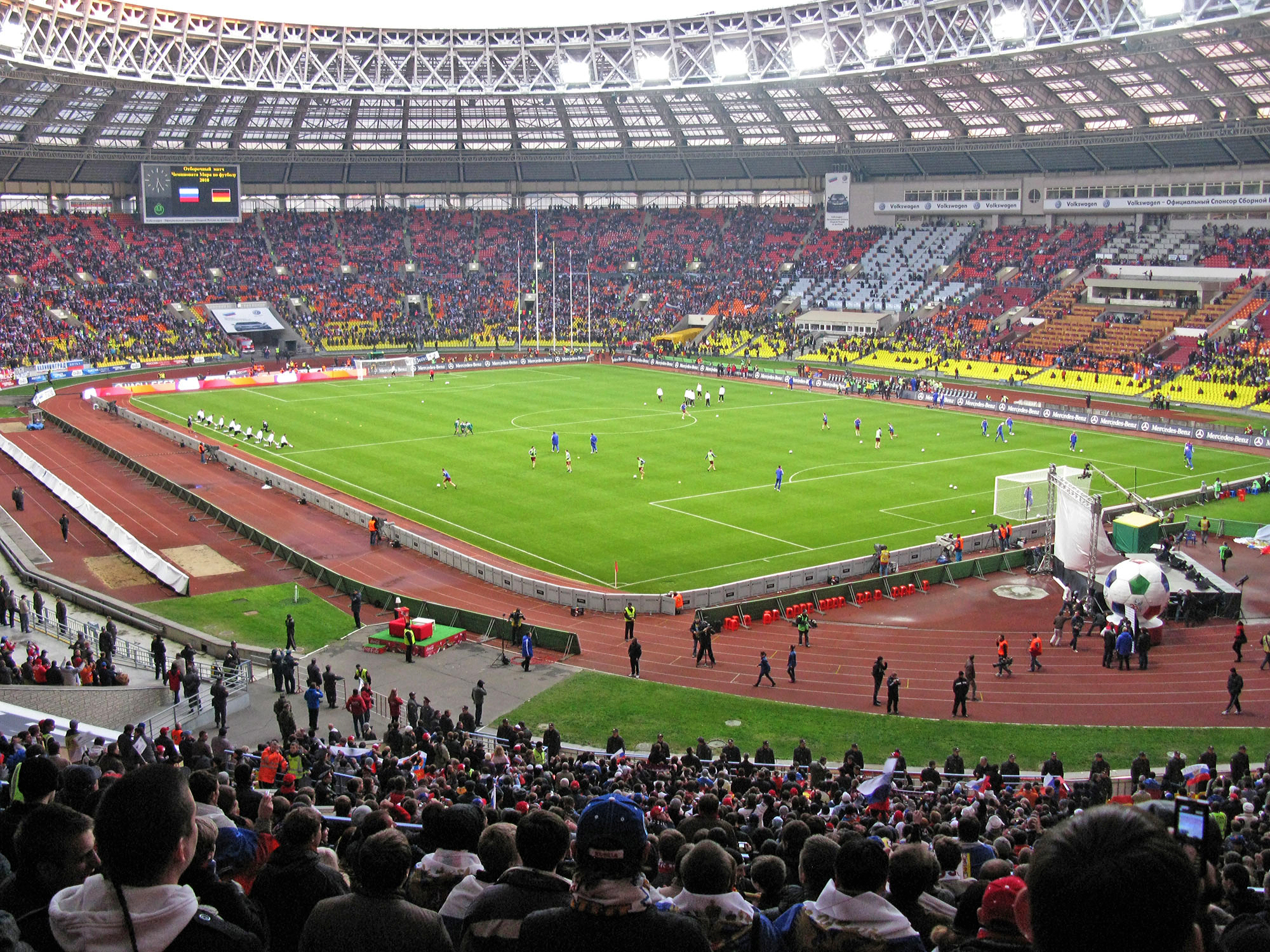
- The Luzhniki Stadium, which hosted the 2013 World Championships
- Major world events: 2013 World Championships

In 2013, the foremost competition in athletics was the 2013 World Championships in Athletics in Moscow. The International Association of Athletics Federations will hold two other global level competitions this year: the 2013 IAAF World Cross Country Championships and the 2013 World Youth Championships in Athletics. The IAAF World Cross Country Championships will return after its move to a biennial format.

The Diamond League enters its fourth year as the foremost seasonal track and field series.

== Major events ==
=== World ===
- World Championships
- World Cross Country Championships
- Diamond League
- World Youth Championships
- World Mountain Running Championships
- IPC Athletics World Championships
- Summer Universiade
- Gymnasiade
- World Military Cross Country Championships
- IAU 100km World Championships
- IAU 24 Hour World Championships
- World Police and Fire Games

=== Regional ===
- European Indoor Championships
- European Team Championships
- European U23 Championships
- European Junior Championships
- European Cross Country Championships
- European Mountain Running Championships
- European Cup Winter Throwing
- European Cup Race Walking
- European Cup 10000m
- European Cup Combined Events
- IAU 100 km European Championships
- Games of the Small States of Europe
- European Youth Olympic Festival
- Mediterranean Games
- Jeux de la Francophonie
- Balkan Games
- Asian Athletics Championships
- Asian Race Walking Championships
- Asian Cross Country Championships
- Asian Youth Games
- Arab Championships
- East Asian Games
- Southeast Asian Games
- Islamic Solidarity Games
- African Junior Championships
- African Youth Championships
- African Race Walking Championships
- African Combined Events Championships
- Oceania Athletics Championships
- Island Games
- Maccabiah Games
- Bolivarian Games
- CARIFTA Games
- Central American and Caribbean Championships
- Central American Championships
- Central American Games
- NACAC Cross Country Championships
- Pan American Race Walking Cup
- Pan American Combined Events Cup
- Pan American Junior Championships
- South American Athletics Championships
- South American Cross Country Championships
- South American Junior Championships

=== National ===
- Canada Summer Games
- Chinese National Games
- German Championships
- Italian Championships
- Italian Indoor Championships
- Japanese Championships
- USA Track and Field Championships

=== Marathons ===
- Tokyo Marathon
- Boston Marathon
- London Marathon
- Berlin Marathon
- Chicago Marathon
- New York City Marathon

== Season's bests ==
Best marks of the year
Event	Men			Women		
Event	Athlete	Mark	Notes	Athlete	Mark	Notes
60 metres	Jimmy Vicaut (FRA)	6.48		Murielle Ahouré (CIV)	6.99	
100 metres	Usain Bolt (JAM)	9.77^{[nb1]}		Shelly-Ann Fraser-Pryce (JAM)	10.71	
200 metres	Usain Bolt (JAM)	19.66		Shelly-Ann Fraser-Pryce (JAM)	22.13	
400 metres	LaShawn Merritt (USA)	43.74		Amantle Montsho (BOT)	49.33	
800 metres	Mohammed Aman (ETH)	1:42.37		Francine Niyonsaba (BDI)	1:56.72	
1500 metres	Asbel Kiprop (KEN)	3:27.72		Abeba Aregawi (ETH)	3:56.60	
Mile run	Silas Kiplagat (KEN)	3:49.48		Sheila Reid (CAN)	4:27.02i	
3000 metres	Galen Rupp (USA)	7:30.16i		Genzebe Dibaba (ETH)	8:26.95i	
5000 metres	Edwin Soi (KEN)	12:51.34		Tirunesh Dibaba (ETH)	14:23.68	
10,000 metres	Dejen Gebremeskel (ETH)	26:51.02		Meseret Defar (ETH)	30:08.06	
60 metres hurdles	Sergey Shubenkov (RUS)	7.49		Brianna Rollins (USA)	7.78	
100/110 metres hurdles	David Oliver (USA)	13.00		Brianna Rollins (USA)	12.26	
400 metres hurdles	Jehue Gordon (TRI)	47.69		Zuzana Hejnová (CZE)	52.83	
3000 metres steeplechase	Ezekiel Kemboi (KEN)	7:59.03		Milcah Chemos (KEN)	9:11.65	
10K run	Adugna Takele (ETH)	27:30		Tirunesh Dibaba (ETH)	30:30	
Half marathon	Geoffrey Kipsang (KEN)	58:54 ^{[nb2]}		Lucy Kabuu (KEN)	66:09	
Marathon	Wilson Kipsang (KEN)	2:03:23		Rita Jeptoo (KEN)	2:19:57	
20 kilometres race walk	Pyotr Trofimov (RUS)	1:18:28		Yelena Lashmanova (RUS)	1:25:49	
50 kilometres race walk	Robert Heffernan (IRL)	3:37:56		—		
Pole vault	Renaud Lavillenie (FRA)	6.02 m		Jenn Suhr (USA)	5.02 mi	
High jump	Bohdan Bondarenko (UKR)	2.41 m		Brigetta Barrett (USA)	2.04 m	
Long jump	Aleksandr Menkov (RUS)	8.56 m		Brittney Reese (USA)	7.25 m	
Triple jump	Teddy Tamgho (FRA)	18.04 m		Olha Saladuha (UKR)	14.88 mi	
Shot put	Ryan Whiting (USA)	22.28 m		Valerie Adams (NZL)	20.98 mi	
Discus throw	Piotr Małachowski (POL)	71.84 m		Sandra Perković (CRO)	68.96 m	
Javelin throw	Tero Pitkämäki (FIN)	89.03 m		Mariya Abakumova (RUS)	70.53 m	
Hammer throw	Krisztián Pars (HUN)	82.40 m		Tatyana Lysenko (RUS)	78.80 m	
Pentathlon	—			Ekaterina Bolshova (RUS)	4851 pts	
Heptathlon	Eelco Sintnicolaas (NED)	6372 pts		Tatyana Chernova (RUS)	6623 pts	
Decathlon	Ashton Eaton (USA)	8809 pts		—		
4×100 metres relay	Jamaica (JAM); Nesta Carter; Kemar Bailey-Cole; Nickel Ashmeade; Usain Bolt	37.36		Jamaica (JAM); Carrie Russell; Kerron Stewart; Schillonie Calvert; Shelly-Ann Fraser-Pryce	41.29	
4×400 metres relay	United States (USA); David Verburg; Tony McQuay; Arman Hall; LaShawn Merritt	2:58.71		Russia (RUS); Yulia Gushchina; Tatyana Firova; Kseniya Ryzhova; Antonina Krivoshapka	3:20.19	

- ^{nb1} Tyson Gay, with 9.75 seconds, had a faster 100 m in 2013, but was disqualified due to doping.
- ^{nb2} Bernard Koech, with 58:41 minutes, had a faster half marathon time but this was set on an aided San Diego course which was not eligible for record purposes.
- ^{nb3} Priscah Jeptoo, with 65:45 minutes, had a faster half marathon time but this was set on an aided course at the Great North Run which was not eligible for record purposes.
