= Kelsey Card =

American track and field athlete

Personal information
- Born: August 20, 1992 (age 33) Plainview, Illinois, U.S.
- Home town: Carlinville, Illinois, U.S.
- Height: 5 ft 10 in (1.78 m)

Sport
- Sport: Track and field
- Event: Discus throw
- College team: University of Wisconsin–Madison
- Turned pro: 2016
- Coached by: David Astrauskas

Achievements and titles
- Personal bests: Discus throw 63.52 m (208 ft 4 3/4 in) Weight throw 22.14 m (72 ft 7 1/2 in); Shot put 18.56 m (60 ft 10 1/2 in); Hammer throw 61.67 m (202 ft 3 3/4 in) as of September 3, 2019
Medal record
Women's athletics
Representing the United States
NACAC U23 Championships
Gold medal – first place	2014 Kamloops	Discus
Gold medal – first place	2014 Kamloops	Shot put
Pan American Junior Championships
Bronze medal – third place	2011 Miramar	Shot put

Kelsey Card (born August 20, 1992) is an American track and field athlete whose specialty is the discus throw.

== Career ==
Kelsey Card finished a master's degree in 2019 and opened Marriage and family therapy business in Madison, Wisconsin.

During the 2016 season, Card won the individual title at the Big Ten Conference outdoor track and field championships and took first place for All-American honors at NCAA national championships in discus.

Kelsey Card placed third in Discus behind Team USA teammates Whitney Ashley and Shelbi Vaughan at 2016 United States Olympic Trials (track and field) to qualify to represent United States at Athletics at the 2016 Summer Olympics.

She represented the United States at the 2020 Summer Olympics.

== International competitions ==
Year	Competition	Venue	Position	Event	Notes
Representing the United States
2011	Pan American Junior Championships	Miramar, United States	3rd	Shot put	15.03 m (49 ft 3 1/2 in)
2014	NACAC U23 Championships	Kamloops, Canada	1st	Shot put	17.32 m (56 ft 9 3/4 in)
2014	NACAC U23 Championships	Kamloops, Canada	1st	Discus	53.82 m (176 ft 6 3/4 in)
2015	Pan American Games	Toronto, Canada	7th	Discus	57.00 m (187 ft 0 in)
2016	Olympic Games	Rio de Janeiro, Brazil	25th (q)	Discus	56.41 m (185 ft 3/4 in)
2019	Pan American Games	Lima, Peru	8th	Discus	58.94 m (193 ft 4 1/4 in)
2019	World Championships	Doha, Qatar	14th (q)	Discus	61.32 m (201 ft 2 in)
2021	Olympic Games	Tokyo, Japan	28th (q)	Discus	56.04 m (183 ft 10 1/4 in)

== USA National Championships ==
Year	Competition	Venue	Position	Event	Notes
2011	USA Junior Championships	Eugene, Oregon	1st	Shot put	15.46 m (50 ft 8 1/2 in)
2011	USA Junior Championships	Eugene, Oregon	9th	Discus	43.63 m (143 ft 1 1/2 in)
2012	US Olympic Trials	Eugene, Oregon	20th	Shot put	15.78 m (51 ft 9 1/4 in)
2014	USA Championships	Sacramento, California	6th	Discus	58.41 m (191 ft 7 1/2 in)
2014	USA Championships	Sacramento, California	4th	Shot put	17.77 m (58 ft 3 1/2 in)
2015	USA Championships	Eugene, Oregon	4th	Discus	60.16 m (197 ft 4 1/2 in)
2015	USA Championships	Eugene, Oregon	18th	Shot put	16.43 m (53 ft 10 3/4 in)
2016	US Olympic Trials	Eugene, Oregon	3rd	Discus	60.13 m (197 ft 3 1/4 in)
2017	USA Championships	Sacramento, California	5th	Discus	56.84 m (186 ft 5 3/4 in)
2017	USA Championships	Sacramento, California	11th	Shot put	16.86 m (55 ft 3 3/4 in)
2018	USA Championships	Des Moines, Iowa	6th	Discus	60.07 m (197 ft 3/4 in)
2019	USA Championships	Des Moines, Iowa	2nd	Discus	63.33 m (207 ft 9 1/4 in)
2021	US Olympic Trials	Eugene, Oregon	4th	Discus	59.37 m (194 ft 9 1/4 in)

== NCAA and Big Ten Championships representing Wisconsin ==
Kelsey earned 11 USTFCCCA NCAA Division I All-American awards and Big Ten Conference honors 14-times.

Representing Wisconsin Badgers women's track and field
Year	Big Ten Indoor Track and Field Championship	NCAA Division I Women's Indoor Track and Field Championships	Big Ten Outdoor Track and Field Championship	NCAA Division I Women's Outdoor Track and Field Championships
2012	Weight Throw 17.42 m (57 ft 1 3/4 in) 20th Shot put 16.14 m (52 ft 11 1/4 in) 3rd	Shot put 16.98 m (55 ft 8 1/2 in) 6th	Big Ten Conference Outdoor Track and Field; Discus 53.49 m (175 ft 5 3/4 in) 5th Shot Put 15.94 m (52 ft 3 1/2 in) 4th	Discus 51.72 m (169 ft 8 in) 16th
2013	Weight Throw 18.36 m (60 ft 2 3/4 in) 10th Shot put 16.10 m (52 ft 9 3/4 in) 3rd	Shot put 16.21 m (53 ft 2 in) 13th	Discus 47.62 m (156 ft 2 3/4 in) 8th Shot Put 16.02 m (52 ft 6 1/2 in) 6th	Discus 50.10 m (164 ft 4 1/4 in) 17th
2014	–	–	–	–
2015	Weight Throw 21.18 m (69 ft 5 3/4 in) 1st Shot put 17.25 m (56 ft 7 in) 1st	Weight Throw 20.26 m (66 ft 5 1/2 in) 11th Shot Put 17.25 m (56 ft 7 in) 4th	Shot put 17.66 m (57 ft 11 1/4 in) 1st Discus 58.71 m (192 ft 7 1/4 in) 2nd	Discus 59.38 m (194 ft 9 3/4 in) 2nd Shot Put 17.96 m (58 ft 11 in) 2nd
2016	Weight Throw 22.14 m (72 ft 7 1/2 in) 1st Shot put 17.55 m (57 ft 6 3/4 in) 1st	Weight Throw 19.77 m (64 ft 10 1/4 in) 13th Shot Put 17.60 m (57 ft 8 3/4 in) 5th	Shot put 18.22 m (59 ft 9 1/4 in) 1st Discus 62.22 m (204 ft 1 1/2 in) 1st Hammer throw 61.67 m (202 ft 3 3/4 in) 3rd	Discus 63.52 m (208 ft 4 3/4 in) 1st Shot Put 17.65 m (57 ft 10 3/4 in) 4th
