= 2013 NACAC Cross Country Championships =

- Organisers: NACAC
- Edition: 9th
- Date: January 26
- Host city: Mandeville, Manchester Parish, Jamaica
- Venue: Manchester Golf Club
- Events: 4
- Distances: 8.1 km – Senior men 6.075 km – Junior men (U20); 6.075 km – Senior women 4.05 km – Junior women (U20)
- Participation: 114 athletes from 8 nations

The 2013 NACAC Cross Country Championships took place on January 26, 2013. The races were held at the Manchester Golf Club in Mandeville, Jamaica. A detailed report of the event was given.

Complete results were published.

== Medallists ==
Event	Gold		Silver		Bronze	
Individual
Senior men (8.1 km)	Craig Forys; United States	24:46	Cameron Levins; Canada	24:47	Kelly Wiebe; Canada	25:04
Junior (U20) men (6.075 km)	Edgar García (Mexico) México	19:10	Estevan De La Rosa; United States	19:13	Víctor Montañez (Mexico) México	19:16
Senior women (6.075 km)	Natasha Fraser; Canada	21:07	Rachel Cliff; Canada	21:35	Beverly Ramos; Puerto Rico	21:48
Junior (U20) women (4.05 km)	Erin Finn; United States	14:09	Madeline Yungblut; Canada	14:18	Gabriela Stafford; Canada	14:25
Team
Senior men	United States	18	Canada	22	Jamaica	74
Junior (U20) men	Canada	31	United States	35	Puerto Rico	52
Senior women	Canada	18	United States	26	Puerto Rico	49
Junior (U20) women	Canada	17	United States	21	Puerto Rico	65

== Medal table (unofficial) ==
* Host nation (Jamaica)

Rank	Nation	Gold	Silver	Bronze	Total
1	Canada (CAN)	4	4	2	10
2	United States (USA)	3	4	0	7
3	Mexico (MEX)	1	0	1	2
4	Puerto Rico (PUR)	0	0	4	4
5	Jamaica (JAM)*	0	0	1	1
Totals (5 entries)		8	8	8	24

- Note: Totals include both individual and team medals, with medals in the team competition counting as one medal.

== Participation ==
According to an unofficial count, 114 athletes from 8 countries participated.

- Bahamas (3)
- Bermuda (10)
- Canada (23)
- Jamaica (22)
- (Mexico) México (8)
- Puerto Rico (17)
- Trinidad and Tobago (11)
- United States (20)

== See also ==
- 2013 in athletics (track and field)
