= Rushell Clayton =

Jamaican hurdler (born 1992)

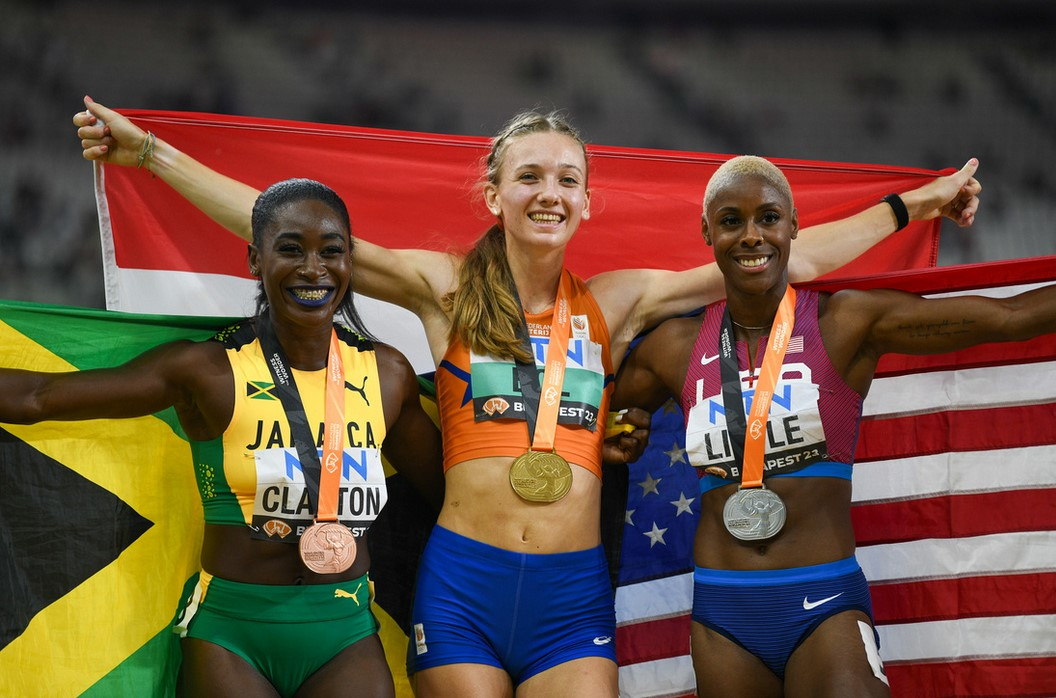
- Rushell Clayton with her bronze medal at the 2023 World Championships in Budapest

Personal information
- Nationality: Jamaican
- Born: 18 October 1992 (age 34) Bath Mountain, Westmoreland
- Education: Mico University College; University of the West Indies
- Height: 5 ft 7 in (170 cm)
- Weight: 140 lb (64 kg)

Sport
- Country: Jamaica
- Sport: Athletics
- Event: 400 metres hurdles
- Club: Elite Performance Track Club; Swept Track Club
- Coached by: Reynaldo Walcott; Okeil Stewart
Medal record
Women's athletics
Representing Jamaica
World Championships
Bronze medal – third place	2019 Doha	400 m hurdles
Bronze medal – third place	2023 Budapest	400 m hurdles
World Relays
Silver medal – second place	2026 Gaborone	Mixed 4 × 400 m relay
Pan Am Games
Bronze medal – third place	2019 Lima	400 m hurdles
Wanda Diamond League
Third place	2023 Eugene	400 mh
NACAC U23 Championships
Bronze medal – third place	2014 Kamloops	400 m hurdles
Bronze medal – third place	2014 Kamloops	4×100 m relay

Rushell Clayton (born 18 October 1992) is a Jamaican athlete specialising in the 400 metres hurdles. She won the bronze medal at the 2019 World Championships and again at the 2023 World Championships, setting her personal best of 52.81 seconds, In 2024, she became the first Jamaican woman since 2011 to break the 53-second barrier in the 400m hurdles.

== Early life ==
Clayton was born in Bath Mountain, Westmoreland. She attended Vere Technical High School in Clarendon, Jamaica.

== Career ==
2014-2022

In 2014 Clayton competed at the NACAC U23 Championships in Kamloops, where she won bronze medals in the 4x100 m relay and 400 m hurdles.

Clayton had a breakthrough year in 2019, winning the 400 m hurdles at the Jamaican Championships in a personal best time of 54.73 s. She won a bronze medal over the same distance at the Pan American Games. At the World Championships in Doha, Clayton claimed a shock bronze medal in a big personal best of 53.74 s, her first time under the 54-second barrier.

She was unable to compete for the majority of the 2021 season due to a leg injury. But returned in the 2022 season, finishing sixth at the 2022 World Championships. Clayton also placed fourth at that year's Commonwealth Games. She set a personal best to win her first Diamond League in Monaco, clocking 53.33 s. She ended her season by setting a meet record of 53.89 s at the Hanžeković Memorial.

== 2023 ==
In 2023, Clayton finished third at the Jamaican Championships to qualify for the World Championships. At the Championships, she won the bronze medal in a personal best of 52.81 s. On 2 September, she won at the Xiamen Diamond League leading a Jamaican 1-2-3 with compatriots Andrenette Knight and Janieve Russell.

== 2024 ==
On 13 April 2024, Clayton set a new personal best of 51.81 s over 400 m at the Tom Jones Memorial in Gainesville. She set a new personal best over 400 m hurdles in winning the 2024 Jamaican Championships, with a time of 52.51 s. At the 2024 Paris Olympics, Clayton finished fifth in a time of 52.68 s.

On 22 October 2024, Clayton signed with Grand Slam Track to be a Racer for the 2025 season.

== 2025 ==
In 2025, she suffered a recurring leg injury which hindered participation at the 2025 World Athletics Championships in Tokyo, Japan. She had won the Jamaican National Trials and earned her place, but withdrew days before the event began.

== 2026 ==
At the 2026 World Athletics Relays in Gaborone, Botswana, she won a silver medal in 3.08:24 national record in the mixed 4 x 400 metres relay running the anchor leg.

== Statistics ==
=== Circuit performances ===
Grand Slam Track results
Slam	Race group	Event	Pl.	Time	Prize money
2025 Kingston Slam	Long hurdles	400 m hurdles	3rd	55.02	US$15,000
2025 Kingston Slam	Long hurdles	400 m		DNF	US$15,000
2025 Philadelphia Slam	Long hurdles	400 m hurdles	5th	55.14	US$15,000
2025 Philadelphia Slam	Long hurdles	400 m	4th	53.17	US$15,000

=== Personal bests ===
Information from her World Athletics profile unless otherwise noted.

Personal best times for individual events
Event	Time	Location	Date	Notes
200 metres	24.06	Kingston, Jamaica	20 April 2024	(Wind: -0.9 m/s)
400 metres	51.81	Gainesville, Florida, United States	13 April 2024	
800 metres	2:12.18	Kingston, Jamaica	30 January 2016	
100 metres hurdles	14.21	Kingston, Jamaica	1 April 2015	(Wind: +2.0 m/s)
400 metres hurdles	52.51	Kingston, Jamaica	28 June 2024	

=== International competitions ===
Representing Jamaica
Year	Competition	Venue	Position	Event	Time	Notes
2011	CARIFTA Games (U20)	Montego Bay, Jamaica	4th	400 m hurdles	59.35	
2011	Pan American Games	Guadalajara, Mexico	12th (h)	400 m hurdles	63.44	
2014	NACACU23 Championships	Kamloops, Canada	3rd	400 m hurdles	63.68	
2014	NACACU23 Championships	Kamloops, Canada	3rd	4 × 100 m relay	45.90	
2015	NACAC Championships	San José, Costa Rica	9th (h)	400 m hurdles	57.71	
2018	Central American and Caribbean Games	Barranquilla, Colombia	4th	400 m hurdles	55.30	
2019	Pan American Games	Lima, Peru	3rd	400 m hurdles	55.53	
2019	World Championships	Doha, Qatar	3rd	400 m hurdles	53.74	PB
2022	World Championships	Eugene, United States	6th	400 m hurdles	54.36	
2023	World Championships	Budapest, Hungary	3rd	400 m hurdles	52.81	PB
2024	Olympic Games	Paris, France	5th	400 m hurdles	52.68	
2026	World Relays	Gaborone, Botswana	2nd	Mixed 4 × 400 m relay	3.08:24	NR
2026	World Ultimate Championship	Budapest, Hungary	8th	400 m hurdles	54.32	
