= Bralon Taplin =

Grenadian athlete (born 1992)

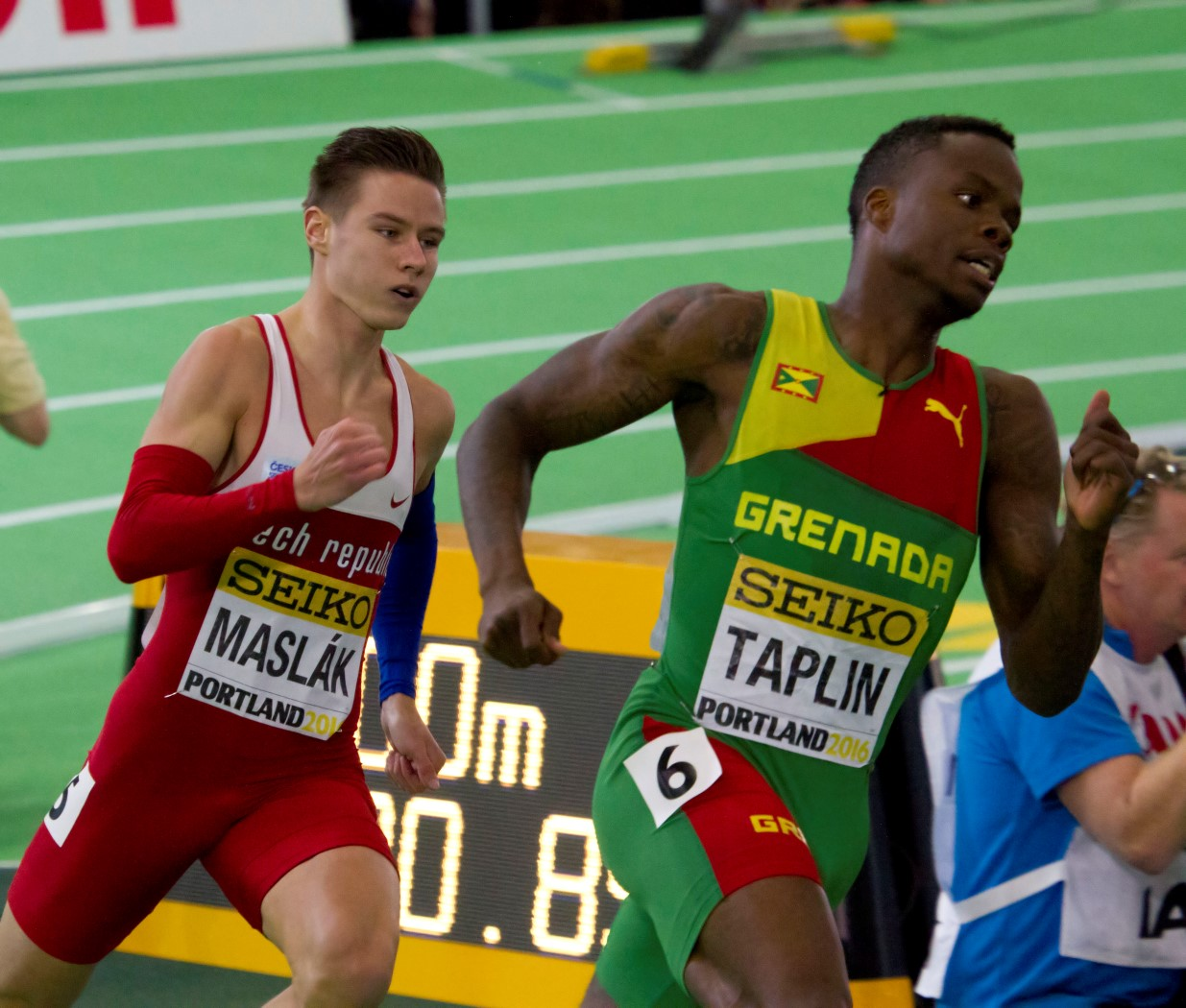
- Bralon Taplin (right) at the 2016 World Indoor Championships

Personal information
- Born: 8 May 1992 (age 34) St. George's, Grenada
- Weight: 79 kg (174 lb)

Sport
- Sport: Athletics
- Event: 400 m
- College team: Texas A&M University
- Coached by: Alleyne Francique

Bralon Taplin (born 8 May 1992) is a Grenadian sprinter.

Taplin is currently serving a seven year competition ban due to two separate violations against the World Athletics Anti-Doping Rules. His ban is due to expire in September 2026.

== Career ==
He competed in the 400 metres event at the 2015 World Championships in Beijing without advancing from the first round.

He switched his allegiance from the United States to Grenada in December 2012. Previously he ran for Stony Point High School, winning the Texas state championship in the 400. then spent two years at South Plains College, winning the NJCAA Championship. He completed his college career at Texas A&M University.

In 2016 he represented Grenada at the Rio Olympics and progressed to the final where he eventually placed 7th with a time of 44.45 seconds.

In 2017 he started his season by participating in the IAAF World Indoor Tour. The first event he would take part in as part of the Tour would be the PSD Bank Meeting, held in Düsseldorf, Germany where he finished first in his group but second overall with a time of 46.25. His second race of the Tour was the Copernicus Cup. He not only finished first overall but he also established a new meet record with a time of 45.59 seconds. The third and deciding race of the Tour was the Müller Indoor Grand Prix which took place in Birmingham, England. In this race Bralon placed fourth with a time of 46.38 seconds. The fourth-place finish meant that Bralon would have missed out on the " Wild Card" entry into the 2018 IAAF World Indoor Championships Birmingham. Aside from the Tour Bralon set a National record in the 300m sprint (indoor) with a time of 31.97 seconds. His time was the fourth fastest indoor 300m time when it was set and was achieved at the Czech Indoor Gala in Ostrava, Czech Republic.

Bralon began his individual 2018 season with a world leading 45.48 indoor at the Ted Nelson Invitational in College Station. At the Charlie Thomas Invitational in College Station, Texas on 3 February, Bralon ran a 44.88 indoor lifetime best over 400m. He became sixth man in history to better the 45-second barrier for 400m indoors. Bralon's time ranks him fifth on the world indoor all-time list, just two places and 0.08 behind his countryman Kirani James, the 2012 Olympic champion.

== Competition record ==
Year	Competition	Venue	Position	Event	Notes
Representing Grenada
2014	Commonwealth Games	Glasgow, United Kingdom	18th (sf)	400 m	46.68
2014	NACAC U23 Championships	Kamloops, Canada	2nd	400 m	45.52
2015	Pan American Games	Toronto, Canada	15th (h)	400 m	47.61
2015	World Championships	Beijing, China	41st (h)	400 m	46.27
2016	World Indoor Championships	Portland, United States	4th	400 m	46.56
2016	Olympic Games	Rio de Janeiro, Brazil	7th	400 m	44.45
2017	IAAF World Indoor Tour - International PSD Bank Meeting Düsseldorf	Düsseldorf (ARENA-SPORTPARK), Germany	2nd	400m	46.25
2017	IAAF World Indoor Tour - Copernicus Cup	Toruń (ARENA), Poland	1st	400m	45.59
2017	2017 Czech Indoor Gala	Ostrava, Czech Republic	1st	300m	31.97 'NR'
2017	IAAF World Indoor Tour -Birmingham Indoor Grand Prix	Birmingham Barclaycard Arena England	4th	400m	46.38
2017	'Villa de Madrid' international Meeting	Madrid Spain	1st	400m	45.19 PB

== Personal bests ==
Outdoor

- 200 metres – 20.83 (+0.4 m/s, San Angelo 2012)
- 400 metres – 44.38 (Monaco 2016)

Indoor

- 200 metres – 20.80 (College Station 2015)
- 300 metres – 31.97 (Ostrava, Czech Republic 2017)NR
- 400 metres – 44.88 (College Station, USA 2018)
