= Trevorvano Mackey =

Bahamian sprinter

Personal information
- Born: 5 January 1992 (age 34) Nassau, Bahamas

Sport
- Country: Bahamas
- Sport: Athletics
- Event: Sprinting
Medal record
Men's Athletics
Representing Bahamas
CAC Championships
| Gold medal – first place | 2013 Morelia | 4×100 m relay |
NACAC U-23 Championships
| Silver medal – second place | 2012 Irapuato | 4x100 m relay |
| Silver medal – second place | 2014 Kamloops | 200 m |
| Bronze medal – third place | 2014 Kamloops | 100 m |
Pan American Junior Championships
| Bronze medal – third place | 2011 Miramar | 4×100 m relay |
CARIFTA Games Junior (U20)
| Bronze medal – third place | 2010 George Town | 100 m |
| Bronze medal – third place | 2010 George Town | 4x100 m relay |
| Bronze medal – third place | 2011 Montego Bay | 4x100 m relay |
- Updated on 28 January 2015

Trevorvano Mackey (born 5 January 1992) is a Bahamian sprinter who competes in the 100m and 200m. Mackey qualified for the 2012 Summer Olympics running a personal best 20.52 over 200m placing 4th at the 2012 NACAC Under-23 Championships in Athletics in Irapuato, Mexico. Mackey is a graduate of Doris Johnson Senior High School in Nassau, Bahamas He competed for South Plains College with compatriot Shavez Hart before transferring to Texas Tech University. They both teamed up to break the Bahamian 4x100 national record in Morelia, Mexico.

== Personal bests ==
| Event | Result | Venue | Date |
Outdoor
| 100 m | 10.21 s (wind: +1.0 m/s) | Lubbock, United States | 3 May 2014 |
| 200 m | 20.46 s (wind: +1.5 m/s) | Kamloops, Canada | 10 August 2014 |
Indoor
| 60 m | 6.82 s | Ames, United States | 28 February 2014 |
| 200 m | 21.23 s | Albuquerque, United States | 7 February 2014 |

== Competition record ==
| Year | Competition | Venue | Position | Event | Notes |
Representing the Bahamas
| 2010 | CARIFTA Games (U20) | George Town, Cayman Islands | 3rd | 100 m | 10.50 (wind: +0.8 m/s) |
| 2010 | CARIFTA Games (U20) | George Town, Cayman Islands | 7th | 200 m | 21.53 (wind: +0.8 m/s) |
| 2010 | CARIFTA Games (U20) | George Town, Cayman Islands | 3rd | 4 × 100 m relay | 40.99 |
| 2010 | Central American and Caribbean Junior Championships (U20) | Santo Domingo, Dominican Republic | 3rd (h) | 100 m | 10.94 (wind: -2.4 m/s) |
| 2010 | Central American and Caribbean Junior Championships (U20) | Santo Domingo, Dominican Republic | 4th (h) | 200 m | 22.23 (wind: -1.8 m/s) |
| 2010 | World Junior Championships | Moncton, Canada | 21st (sf) | 200 m | 21.71 (wind: +2.0 m/s) |
| 2010 | World Junior Championships | Moncton, Canada | 15th (h) | 4 × 100 m relay | 40.58 |
| 2011 | CARIFTA Games (U20) | Montego Bay, Jamaica | 7th | 100m | 10.74 (wind: -0.2 m/s) |
| 2011 | CARIFTA Games (U20) | Montego Bay, Jamaica | 7th | 200m | 21.89 (wind: -1.1 m/s) |
| 2011 | CARIFTA Games (U20) | Montego Bay, Jamaica | 3rd | 4 × 100 m relay | 40.29 |
| 2011 | Pan American Junior Championships | Miramar, United States | 3rd (h) | 100m | 10.51 w (wind: +2.1 m/s) |
| 2011 | Pan American Junior Championships | Miramar, United States | 8th | 200m | 21.49 w (wind: +2.2 m/s) |
| 2011 | Pan American Junior Championships | Miramar, United States | 3rd | 4 × 100 m relay | 40.26 |
| 2012 | NACAC Under-23 Championships | Irapuato, Mexico | 4th | 200 m | 20.52 (wind: -0.5 m/s) |
| 2012 | NACAC Under-23 Championships | Irapuato, Mexico | 2nd | 4 × 100 m relay | 39.65 |
| 2012 | Olympic Games | London, United Kingdom | 48th (h) | 200m | 21.28 (wind: +0.8 m/s) |
| 2013 | Central American and Caribbean Championships | Morelia, Mexico | 9th (h) | 200m | 21.01 A (wind: -0.9 m/s) |
| 2013 | Central American and Caribbean Championships | Morelia, Mexico | 1st | 4 × 100 m relay | 38.77 A |
| 2014 | NACAC U-23 Championships | Kamloops, Canada | 3rd | 100m | 10.30 (wind: +0.2 m/s) |
| 2014 | NACAC U-23 Championships | Kamloops, Canada | 2nd | 200m | 20.46 (wind: +1.5 m/s) |
| 2015 | NACAC Championships | San José, Costa Rica | 8th | 4 × 100 m relay | 40.33 |
