= 2011 Pan American Junior Athletics Championships =

XVI Pan American Junior Athletics Championships
- Dates: 22–24 July
- Host city: Miramar, Florida, United States
- Venue: Ansin Sports Complex
- Level: Junior
- Events: 44
- Participation: about 341 athletes from 36 nations

The 16th Pan American Junior Championships were held in Miramar, Florida, United States, at the Ansin Sports Complex on July 22 to 24, 2011. A detailed report on the results was given.

== Participation (unofficial) ==
Detailed result lists can be found on the "World Junior Athletics History" website. An unofficial count yields the number of about 341 athletes from about 36 countries:

Antigua and Barbuda (5), Argentina (11), Bahamas (23), Barbados (7), Bermuda (7), Belize (1), Bolivia (1), Brazil (16), British Virgin Islands (5), Cayman Islands (2), Canada (56), Chile (6), Colombia (12), Costa Rica (2), Dominica (1), Dominican Republic (4), Ecuador (1), El Salvador (1), Grenada (1), Guatemala (4), Guyana (2), Haiti (3), Jamaica (33), Mexico (15), Panama (1), Peru (8), Puerto Rico (12), Saint Kitts and Nevis (1), Saint Vincent and the Grenadines (2), Suriname (2), Trinidad and Tobago (12), Turks and Caicos (1), United States (77), Uruguay (1), U.S. Virgin Islands (1), Venezuela (4).

== Medal summary ==
Medal winners are published. Complete results can be found on the Athletics Canada website, on the Half-Mile Timing website, on the USA Track & Field website, and on the World Junior Athletics History website.

=== Men ===
Event	Gold		Silver		Bronze	
100 m (Wind: +2.4 m/s)	Marvin Bracy (USA)	10.09	Keenan Brock (USA)	10.12	Aaron Brown (CAN)	10.25
200 m	Kirani James (GRN)	20.53	Sean McLean (USA)	20.69	Trey Hadnot (USA)	20.82
400 m	Joshua Mance (USA)	46.14	Deon Lendore (TRI)	46.50	Anderson Henriques (BRA)	46.69
800 m	Immanuel Hutchinson (USA)	1:49.04	Wesley Vázquez (PUR)	1:49.83	Lucirio Antonio Garrido (VEN)	1:49.88
1500 m	Omar Kaddurah (USA)	3:52.29	Isaac Presson (USA)	3:52.78	Ioran Etchechury (BRA)	3:53.29
5000 m	Jake Hurysz (USA)	14:55.92	José Luis Rojas (PER)	14:58.47	Andrew Kowalsky (CAN)	14:58.51
10,000 m	Parker Stinson (USA)	30:37.88	Said Díaz Ceron Jr. (MEX)	31:10.72	Alexander Monroe (USA)	31:21.42
110 m hurdles	Eddie Lovett (USA)	13.14	Roy Smith (USA)	13.24	João Vítor de Oliveira (BRA)	13.97
400 m hurdles	Monte Corley (USA)	51.21	Jordin Andrade (USA)	52.09	Kion Joseph (BAR)	52.47 PB
3000 m steeplechase	Fernando Román (PUR)	8:59.52	Eddie Owens (USA)	9:07.11	Gareth Hadfield (CAN)	9:15.94
4×100 m relay	United States (USA); Sean McLean; Marvin Bracy; Keenan Brock; Oliver Bradwell	39.43	Canada (CAN); Marlon Laidlaw-Allen; Aaron Brown; Akeem Haynes; Tremaine Harris	39.97	Bahamas (BAH); Blake Bartlett; Shavez Hart; Delano Davis; Trevorvano Mackey	40.26
4×400 m relay	United States (USA); Clayton Gravesande; William Henry; Davelle Sanders; Joshua Mance	3:08.20	Trinidad and Tobago (TRI); Jereem Richards; Machel Cedenio; Moriba Morain; Deon Lendore	3:13.27	Bahamas (BAH); Nejmi Burnside; Andre Wells; Shavez Hart; Julian Munroe	3:14.96
10,000 m race walk	Éider Arévalo (COL)	41:29.81	Trevor Barron (USA)	41:39.16	José Leonardo Montaña (COL)	42:00.88
High jump	Maalik Reynolds (USA)	2.22 m	Ryan Ingraham (BAH)	2.22 m	Brandon Baskerville (USA)	2.15 m
Pole vault	Thiago Braz da Silva (BRA)	5.20 m	Jonathon Juilfs (USA)	5.10 m	Matheus Da Silva (BRA)	4.85 m
Long jump	Devin Field (USA)	7.58 m	Terrance Williams (USA)	7.54 m	Rolyce Boston (GUY)	7.34 m
Triple jump	Elton Walcott (TRI)	16.51 m	Phillip Young (USA)	16.01 m	Latario Collie-Minns (BAH)	15.93 m
Shot put	Ashinia Miller (JAM)	19.97 m NJR	Kyle McKelvey (USA)	18.39 m	Caleb Whitener (USA)	18.29 m
Discus throw	Travis Smikle (JAM)	66.58 m CR	Gabe Hull (USA)	57.78 m	Fedrick Dacres (JAM)	57.24 m
Hammer throw	Alec Faldermeyer (USA)	72.89 m	Diego del Real (MEX)	66.77 m	Adam Keenan (CAN)	66.62 m
Javelin throw	Braian Toledo (ARG)	76.40 m CR	Cody Parker (CAN)	73.50 m	Paulo Da Silva (BRA)	72.25 m
Decathlon	Kevin Lazas (USA)	7979 CR	Gunnar Nixon (USA)	7669	Guillermo Manuel Ruggeri (ARG)	7118

=== Women ===
Event	Gold		Silver		Bronze	
100 m	Michelle-Lee Ahye (TRI)	11.25	Keilah Tyson (USA)	11.39 PB	Anthonique Strachan (BAH)	11.46
200 m	Anthonique Strachan (BAH)	22.70 CR	Kai Selvon (TRI)	22.97	Jessica Davis (USA)	22.97
400 m	Chris-Ann Gordon (JAM)	52.62	Diamond Dixon (USA)	53.10	Phyllis Francis (USA)	53.81
800 m	Kenyetta Iyevbele (USA)	2:06.27	Annie LeBlanc (CAN)	2:06.35	Samantha Levin (USA)	2:07.68
1500 m	Cory McGee (USA)	4:35.46	Lindsey Butterworth (CAN)	4:36.91	Brook Handler (USA)	4:37.17
3000 m	Kayla Beattie (USA)	9:30.63	Allison Woodward (USA)	9:31.83	Adriana da Luz (BRA)	9:41.70
5000 m	Kayla Beattie (USA)	16:48.44	Charo Inga Quinto (PER)	16:54.23	Luz Mery Rojas Llanco (PER)	17:00.10
100 m hurdles (Wind: +1.0 m/s)	Trinity Wilson (USA)	13.17	Danielle Williams (JAM)	13.32	Bridgette Owens-Mitchell (USA)	13.34
400 meter hurdles	Katrina Seymour (BAH)	57.87	Danielle Dowie (JAM)	58.55	Déborah Rodríguez (URU)	59.10
3000 m steeplechase	Alexandra Leptich (USA)	10:43.76	Grace Heymsfield (USA)	10:47.01	Jovana De La Cruz Capani (PER)	10:52.14
4×100 m relay	Bahamas (BAH); Devynne Charlton; Carmiesha Cox; V'Alonee Robinson; Anthonique Strachan	45.09	Jamaica (JAM); Danielle Williams; Celia Walters; Natasha Morrison; Cardine Copeland	45.37	Canada (CAN); Ashlea Maddex; Ocian Archer; Jellisa Westney; Katherine Reid	46.35
4×400 m relay	United States (USA); Ebony Eutsey; Phyllis Francis; Briana Nelson; Diamond Dixon	3:34.71	Canada (CAN); Kelsey Balkwill; Annie LeBlanc; Katherine Reid; Rachel Francois	3:38.99	Bahamas (BAH); Anthonique Strachan; Pedrya Seymour; Devynne Charlton; Katrina Seymour	3:42.61
10,000 m race walk	Sandra Arenas (COL)	48:15.78	Magaly Bonilla (ECU)	53:23.41	Only 2 starters	
High jump	Shanay Briscoe (USA)	1.83 m	Alyxandria Treasure (CAN)	1.80 m	Kimberly Williamson (JAM)	1.80 m
Pole vault	Morgann LeLeux (USA)	4.15 m	Sandi Morris (USA)	4.05 m	Karleigh Parker (CAN)	3.80 m
Long jump	Jessica dos Reis (BRA)	6.39 m	Ashley Stacey (USA)	6.13 m	Caroline Ehrhardt (CAN)	5.92 m
Triple jump	Giselly Landázury (COL)	13.04 m	Tamara Myers (BAH)	12.85 m	Caroline Ehrhardt (CAN)	12.83 m
Shot put	Alessandra Gamboa Dulong (PER)	15.23 m	Christina Hillman (USA)	15.11 m	Kelsey Card (USA)	15.03 m
Discus throw	Shelbi Vaughan (USA)	53.12 m	Esthefania da Costa (BRA)	52.96 m	Lidiane Cansian (BRA)	52.39 m
Hammer throw	Shelby Ashe (USA)	59.25 m	Daina Levy (JAM)	55.79 m	Karen Henning (USA)	54.18 m
Javelin throw	Avione Allgood (USA)	53.06 m	DeLoma Miller (USA)	47.26 m	Daliadiz Ortíz (PUR)	45.88 m
Heptathlon	Tamara de Sousa (BRA)	5,477	Janieve Russell (JAM)	5,352	Deanna Latham (USA)	5,277

== Medal table (unofficial) ==
* Host nation (United States)

Rank	Nation	Gold	Silver	Bronze	Total
1	United States*	26	21	12	59
2	Jamaica	3	5	2	10
3	Bahamas	3	2	5	10
4	Brazil	3	1	7	11
5	Colombia	3	0	1	4
6	Trinidad and Tobago	2	3	0	5
7	Peru	1	2	2	5
8	Puerto Rico	1	1	1	3
9	Argentina	1	0	1	2
10	Grenada	1	0	0	1
11	Canada	0	6	8	14
12	Mexico	0	2	0	2
13	Ecuador	0	1	0	1
14	Barbados	0	0	1	1
14	Guyana	0	0	1	1
14	Uruguay	0	0	1	1
14	Venezuela	0	0	1	1
Totals (17 entries)		44	44	43	131
