= Alexander Balkwill =

Scottish footballer

Personal information
- Full name: Alexander Forbes Balkwill
- Date of birth: 15 December 1877
- Place of birth: Inverness, Scotland
- Date of death: 1947 (aged 69–70)
- Position: Centre forward

Senior career*
Years	Team	Apps	(Gls)
1899–1900	Alvaston F.C.		
1900–1901	Derby County	0	(0)
1901	Ripley Town		
1901–1902	Derby County	11	(1)
Total		11	(1)
- * Club domestic league appearances and goals

Alexander Forbes Balkwill (15 December 1877 – 1947) was a Scottish footballer who played in the Football League for Derby County.
