= Kelsey Balkwill =

Canadian athlete

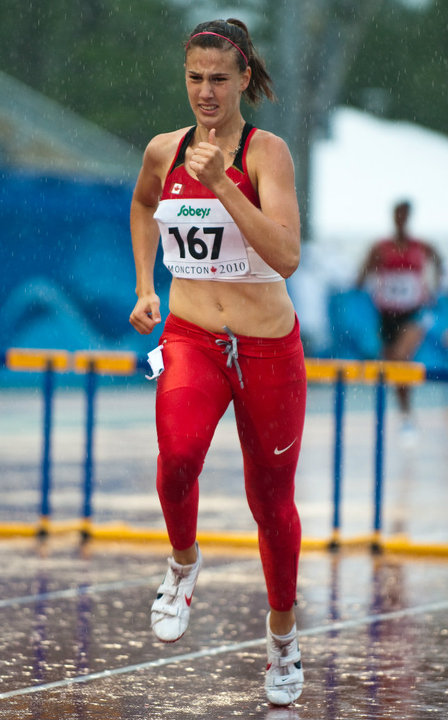

Personal information
- Full name: Kelsey Ellen Balkwill
- Nationality: Canadian
- Born: September 19, 1992 (age 33) Leamington, Ontario
- Height: 5 ft 9 in (1.75 m)

Sport
- Country: Canada
- Sport: Athletics
- Event(s): 400m, 400m hurdles

Achievements and titles
- World finals: 6th 2010 World Junior Championships in Athletics, 19th 2018 World Indoor Championships in Athletics
- Personal bests: 400 m Indoor: 52.64 (Fayetteville 2018); 400 m: 53.14 (Ottawa 2018); 400 m hurdles: 56.34 (Ninove 2018); 4x400 m relay: 3:29.23 (Baton Rouge 2018)
Medal record
Women's athletics
Representing Canada
Pan American Junior Championships
Silver medal – second place	2011 Miramar-Florida	4×400 m relay

Kelsey Ellen Balkwill (born September 19, 1992) is a Canadian athlete. She is an NCAA All-American, a U Sports All-Canadian, a silver medallist from the Pan American Junior Championships and a finalist from the 2010 World Junior Championships in Athletics.

== Personal ==
Balkwill was born in Leamington, Ontario, to Todd and Kim Balkwill, and grew up with two siblings. She graduated from Essex District High School, where she was a six-time outdoor provincial champion in the 400m and intermediate hurdles. After graduating from the University of Miami. She continued training as a member of the Windsor, Ontario track and field community.

== Career ==
At the 2010 World Junior Championships in Athletics in Moncton, Balkwill ran a personal best time of 59.04 in the semi-final in order to qualify for the final. She went on to place 6th in final of the 400m hurdles in a personal best time of 57.94 which was also an Ontario provincial Junior-U19 record for the event. At the 2011 Pan American Junior Athletics Championships in Miramar, Florida, Balkwill finished 4th in the 400m hurdles in a time of 59.21 after a 7-week layoff due to an ankle injury. She then combined with Annie LeBlanc, Katherine Reid, and Rachel Francois to win silver behind the United States and ahead of the Bahamas in the 4×400 m relay in a time of 3:38.99. In 2012 as a freshman at the University of Miami she sustained a navicular fracture to her foot, which required surgery and forced her to end her outdoor season prematurely. After a 1-year hiatus from competitive competition, Balkwill returned to the track as a redshirt freshman to post a time of 54.63 in the 400m at the Georgia Tech Invitational on May 10, 2013. 2015 was a break out year for Balkwill and she returned to form by successfully making NCAA Championships in Oregon, in the 400m Hurdles with a personal best of 56.80 and helping lead the University of Miami women's 4x400m team to a 6th-place finish earning All-American status in both events. In July 2015 she represented Canada by competing at the 2015 Summer Universiade in Gwangju, Korea narrowly missing the 400mh final. In 2017, she was named to the 2017 IAAF World Relays Championship in Nassau, Bahamas and also to the 2017 Summer Universiade in Taipei, Taiwan. During the 2018 indoor season, she had a break through in the 400m as she ran a personal best of 52.64 at the Tyson Invitational in Fayetteville, Arkansas. She subsequently was named to the 2018 IAAF World Indoor Championships in Birmingham, England, where she finished 19th in a time of 53.29.
