= Adam Keenan =

Canadian track and field athlete

Personal information
- Born: September 26, 1993 (age 32) Victoria, British Columbia, Canada
- Height: 1.80 m (5 ft 11 in)

Achievements and titles
- Personal best: 77.54 m (2022)
Medal record
Men's track and field
Representing Canada
NACAC Championships
Bronze medal – third place	Toronto 2018	Hammer throw
NACAC U23 Championships
Bronze medal – third place	2014 Kamloops	Hammer throw
Pan American Junior Championships
Bronze medal – third place	Miramar 2011	Hammer throw

Adam Keenan (born September 26, 1993) is a Canadian track and field athlete specializing in the hammer throw.

== Career ==
=== Junior ===
Keenan first competed for Canada at the 2011 Pan American Junior Athletics Championships in Miramar, Florida, where he won the bronze medal in the hammer throw with a distance of 66.62 meters. Keenan would later compete at the 2012 World Junior Championships finishing in 28th place overall.

Keenan competed for the Northern Arizona Lumberjacks track and field team in the NCAA.

=== Senior ===
At the 2014 NACAC U23 Championships in Athletics in Kamloops, British Columbia, Keenan won the bronze medal with a throw of 68.35 meters.

In 2018, Keenan competed at the 2018 Commonwealth Games in Gold Coast, Australia finishing fourth in the hammer throw event, and followed that with a bronze medal finish at the 2018 NACAC Championships in Toronto, Ontario with a throw of 72.72 metres. Keenan narrowly missed out on qualifying for the 2020 Summer Olympics in Tokyo, Japan.

In June 2022, Keenan set a new personal best of 77.54 meters, which met the World Championships standard. Later that month, Keenan won his fifth consecutive National title. Keenan was also named to compete at both the 2022 World Athletics Championships and 2022 Commonwealth Games.
