= Darren Alfred =

Trinidad and Tobago middle-distance runner

Personal information
- Nationality: Trinidad and Tobago
- Born: 28 August 1996 (age 29)

Sport
- Sport: Athletics
- Event: 400 metres

Darren Alfred (born 28 August 1996) is a Trinidad and Tobago track and field athlete who specializes in middle-distance running. He represented Trinidad and Tobago at the 2019 World Athletics Championships, competing in men's 4 × 400 metres relay.
