= Erin Finn =

American long-distance runner

Personal information
- Born: November 19, 1994 (age 31) West Bloomfield, Michigan, U.S.
- Height: 5 ft 3 in (1.60 m)

Sport
- Country: United States
- Sport: Track, long-distance running
- Event(s): 1500 meters, mile, 5000 meters, 10,000 meters
- College team: University of Michigan Wolverines
- Coached by: Mike McGuire
Medal record
Women's athletics
Representing the United States
NACAC U23
Gold medal – first place	Kamloops	5000 mCR
NACAC Cross Country Championships
Gold medal – first place	Mandeville, Jamaica	4000 m

Erin Finn (born November 19, 1994, in West Bloomfield, Michigan) is a female long-distance runner from the United States. She competed in the 2013 IAAF World Cross Country Championships – Junior women's race placing 34th in 20:03.

== Prep ==
Erin Finn won 2011 and 2012 Michigan High School Athletic Association division 1 state Cross country titles for West Bloomfield High School. Finn finished second at 2011 Foot Locker Cross Country Championships. Finn finished seventh at 2010 Foot Locker Cross Country Championships. Finn is a two-time Gatorade cross country runner of the year in Michigan. Erin held the national high school record in the 5000 meters run indoors, running 16:19.69 to win the New Balance Indoor nationals in New York's Fort Washington Avenue Armory in March 2012 before Mary Cain set a new record in 2013.

== NCAA ==
Erin Finn is a 9-time NCAA Division I All-American and 10-time Big Ten champion (4 outdoor). She placed sixth in 10,000 meters in a time of 32:50.14 at 2014 NCAA Division I Outdoor Track and Field Championships. Finn placed fifth in 5000 meters in 15:43.97 at 2015 NCAA Division I Outdoor Track and Field Championships. Finn placed 12th in 10,000 m at 2019 NCAA Division I Outdoor Track and Field Championships in 33:40.88.

Year	Big Ten Conference Cross Country Championship	NCAA Cross Country Championship	Big Ten Conference Indoor track and field Championship	NCAA Indoor track and field Championship	Big Ten Conference Outdoor track and field Championship	NCAA Outdoor track and field Championship
2018-19					10,000 m 33:23.17 7th	10,000 m 33:40.88 12th place
2017-18					10,000 m 32:45.51 1st	
2016-17	20:37.3 1st	19:44.2 2nd	5000 m 15:32.45 3rd	5000 m 15:27.36 2nd		
2016-17			3000 m 9:08.38 3rd			
2015-16	19:44.9 1st	20:10.2 19th	5000 m 15:37.31 1st	5000 m 15:23.16 2nd		
2015-16			3000 m 9:08.09 1st	3000 m 9:04.40 2nd		
2014-15					10,000 m 33:54.85 1st	
2014-15					5000 m 16:14.27 3rd	5000 m 15:43.97 5th
2013-14			3000 m 9:12.59 2nd		5000 m 15:48.90 1st	
2013-14	20:48.3 1st	20:40.2 30th	5000 m 15:52.11 1st	5000 m 16:51.10 12th	10,000 m 32:41.65 1st	10,000 m 32:50.14 6th

== International ==
Finn placed 8th in Beach to Beacon 10K in 33:16 August 5, 2017, in Cape Elizabeth, Maine. Finn won Big Ten Network 5k in 16:8 July 23, 2017, in Chicago, Illinois.

Finn placed 10th in mile in 4:26 at Kalakaua Merrie Mile in Honolulu, Hawai'i on December 10, 2016.

Finn won gold at 2014 NACAC Under-23 Championships in Athletics in 16:06.26 setting a championship record.

She competed in the 2013 IAAF World Cross Country Championships – Junior women's race placing 34th in 20:03 in 6 km in Bydgoszcz. Erin Finn won 2013 NACAC Cross Country Championships Junior Women race in 14:09 over the 4 km course in Mandeville, Jamaica, as Team USA finished second to Canada.

Year	Competition	Venue	Position	Event	Notes
2017	2017 USA Outdoor Track and Field Championships	Hornet Stadium (Sacramento)	6th	10,000 m	32:00.46
2016	2016 United States Olympic Trials (track and field)	Hayward Field	DNS	10,000 m	DNS
2015	2015 USA Outdoor Track and Field Championships	Hayward Field	DNS	10,000 m	DNS
2013	USA Cross Country Championships Junior	Forest Park (St. Louis, Missouri)	2nd	6000 m	20:48.6
2012	USA Junior Outdoor Track and Field Championships	Bloomington, Indiana	4th	5000 m	16:58.77
