= Joy SpearChief-Morris =

Indigenous Canadian hurdler

- Born: 17 March 1994 (age 32); Lethbridge, Alberta, Canada

Joy SpearChief-Morris (born 17 March 1994) is an indigenous Canadian hurdler from Lethbridge, Alberta. She is a multiple Ontario University Athletics and U Sports (formerly Canadian Interuniversity Sport) track champion and has competed for the Canadian U23 National Team. A Blackfoot from Alberta's Blood Tribe (also known as the Kainai Nation), SpearChief-Morris was the (female) recipient of the 2017 Tom Longboat Awards, awarded annually by the Aboriginal Sport Circle to the most outstanding male and female indigenous athletes in Canada. Her mother is Kainai First Nation and her father is an African-American from Los Angeles.

Currently, she holds the 115th position in the World Ranking of the International Association of Athletics Federations for 100-metre hurdles, scoring 1137 points. Her best position to date in such an event has been 111th. In the Women's Overall Ranking, she occupies the 1400th position.

In June 2019, SpearChief-Morris was announced as part of the Canadian delegation for the 2019 FISU Summer Universiade, held in July, in Italy. In the 100-metre hurdles, she obtained the fifth place in the final (13.34 seconds). That was her first time competing in the hurdles on the international stage.

She trained to win a spot on the Canadian Olympic team and compete in the 2020 Summer Olympics, in Tokyo, Japan, but was unsuccessful.

== Personal life ==
SpearChief-Morris was born in Lethbridge, Alberta, in a family that loved basketball. As a child, she was influenced by her older brother Julian SpearChief-Morris to practice sports and describes herself as a "multi-sport athlete all through school". In elementary school, SpearChief-Morris's favorite events were track and field and the high jump, but she also practised volleyball and basketball. She ultimately chose to join track and field, as she excelled in the sport above her peers. In high school, she won the 100-metre at the Alberta Provincials and eventually decided to pursue her favourite sport on a competitive level. She graduated from Lethbridge Collegiate Institute high school in 2012.

Her brother, Julian SpearChief-Morris is the first indigenous student to head Harvard Law School's venerable Legal Aid Bureau.

== Athletic career ==
As a result of her performance in high school, The University of Guelph wanted the young athlete on their team, and paid her an official visit. According to SpearChief-Morris, during her time in Guelph, she met distance runners and a jumper but, as a 100m and 200m athlete, she would have preferred to spend time with the team's sprinters.

Still looking for a place to develop as an athlete and as a student, SpearChief-Morris pursued a pathway to universities in the United States, but her options did not satisfy her academic expectations.

Eventually, SpearChief-Morris earned a scholarship to the University of British Columbia (UBC) in Vancouver with the assistance of her high school vice-principal. Despite that, most of her financial aid was based on academic performance and external entrance scholarships.

She left her hometown and headed to Vancouver in the Fall of 2012. At UBC, she first met coach Derrick Johnston. According to him, the athlete stood out since the first training sessions and started to develop as a sprinter at the 100 metres and 200 metres.

In the second year at UBC, SpearChief-Morris was not satisfied with her academic program, and changed it once to classical archaeology and once again to anthropology. All the alterations were made before the end of the year. At the same time, she did not receive a scholarship raise and the team atmosphere was not as good as before. In addition, coach Derrick Johnston accepted a job offer from the University of Western Ontario (UWO), located in London, Ontario.

Coach Derrick Johnston suggested to Western's head coach, Vickie Croley, the addition of SpearChief-Morris to the track and field team. Soon after, the athlete moved to UWO and, once again, switched her academic program to history with a minor in First Nations studies.

The athlete considers her "choice to transfer to Western one of the best decisions" she has ever made. SpearChief-Morris formerly held the UWO school records for the 60-m and 60-m hurdles events and is a four-time All-Canadian athlete. She is also the winner of seven U Sports national championship medals, including the 2016 women's 60-m sprint national title.

In 2014, SpearChief-Morris' international debuted during the NACAC Under-23 Championships in Athletics in Kamloops, British Columbia. Her 100-m relay team took home the silver, behind the United States.

Three years later, after graduating from UWO, SpearChief-Morris changed her training location, moving from London to Santa Barbara, California. There she joined the Santa Barbara Track Club, intending to make the Canadian Team for the 2020 Olympic Games in Tokyo, Japan. Since 2012, her idol is the American Olympic and World track and field sprinter champion Allyson Felix. According to SpearChief-Morris, what she most admires in Allyson is her dominance in so many events.

Initially, SpearChief-Morris thought that California would be the best training location, but she did not enjoy her experience and opted to return to Ontario.

== Education ==
Joy SpearChief-Morris has a Bachelor of Arts in History and First Nations Studies from the University of Western Ontario (UWO).

Currently, she studies a master's degree in Political Science specializing in Transitional Justice at UWO. Her research focuses on Indigenous treaties, land claims, and reconciliation in Canada.

Nowadays, SpearChief-Morris also works as a program coordinator assistant at the Indigenous Student Centre at the UWO.

== Volunteerism ==
She volunteers extensively within Canadian indigenous communities and aspires to be a role model for aboriginal youth. In 2017, she was awarded the Student Athlete Community Service Award by both the OUA and U Sports. SpearChief-Morris is both a "volunteer speaker and motivator for the Kainai 5 km Community Fun Run, which encourages health and fitness in the Kainai community. She was also the keynote speaker at the Kainai Truth and Reconciliation Conference's First Nations Track and Field Day, where she spoke about the power of sport.

== Notable accomplishments ==
- Western University Record Holder in the 60m, 60m Hurdles and 4 × 200 m First Leg Split
- 2x All American at NAIA National Track and Field Championships (100m and 200m) (2014)
- 5x Academic All Canadian achievement (2012-2017)
- 3x Western Mustangs Women's Track Most Valuable Performer (MVP) (2015-2017)
- 8x Team All-Star at the Ontario University Athletics (OUA) Championships (2015-2017)
- 4x All Canadian at the Canadian Interuniversity Sport (CIS)/USports Championships (2015-2017)
- 3x Ontario University Athletics (OUA) Champion (60mH, 60m, 4 × 200 m) (2016-2017)
- 2x Ontario University Athletics (OUA) Female Track Event Most Valuable Performer (MVP) (2016-2017)
- 2014 - North American and Caribbean Athletic Championships (NACAC) U23 Canadian National Team Member; silver medal 4 × 100 m
- 2016 - Canadian University Athletics (USPORTS) Champion in the 60m
- 2017 - Bronze W Award Winner for Western University Athletics
- 2017 - Purple Blanket Award Winner for Western University Athletics
- 2017 - Don Wright Trophy Award Winner for Western University Track and Field
- 2017 - Ontario University Athletics (OUA) and Canadian University Athletics (USports) Student Athlete Community Service Award
- 2017 - The F.W.P. Jones Award as Top Graduating Female Athlete for Western University Athletics
- 2017 - The Honourable G. Howard Ferguson Award for Western University at 309th Spring Convocation
- 2017 - Tom Longboat National Award Winner as the Canadian Female Aboriginal Athlete of the Year

== Personal records ==
Outdoor

- 100m Hurdles: 13.59 +1.1 wind (2017)
- 100m Hurdles: 13.45 +3.6 (2017)
- 100m: 11.68 +1.0 (2014)
- 100m 11.52 +3.9 (2016)
- 200m: 24.03 +2.0 (2014)

Indoor

- 60m: 7.40 (2016)
- 60m Hurdles: 8.28 (2017)
