= Maria Bernard =

Canadian track and field athlete

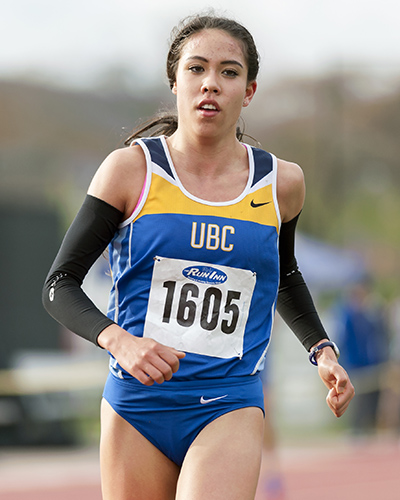
- Bernard running for the UBC Thunderbirds at the UBC Invitational track and field meet on April 3, 2015

Personal information
- Full name: Maria Bernard-Galea
- Born: April 6, 1993 (age 33) Calgary, Alberta, Canada
- Height: 1.65 m (5 ft 5 in)
- Weight: 53 kg (117 lb)

Sport
- Country: Canada
- Sport: Athletics
- Event: Middle distance
- Coached by: Mike Van Tighem / Terry Crook/ Marek Jedrzejek (at UBC)

Achievements and titles
- Personal best: 3,000 steeplechase = 9:44.81

Maria Bernard (born April 6, 1993) is a Canadian track and field athlete competing in the middle-distance events, predominantly the 3,000-meter steeplechase.

In July 2016, she was officially named to Canada's Olympic team.

Bernard competed for the UBC Thunderbirds during her time in university, leading her team to three NAIA cross country team championships from 2012 to 2014. In 2014, Bernard won the NAIA cross country individual title as well, capping off a cross country career with four All-American honours.

An eight-time NAIA All-American in track and field, she was named the 2015 Herbert B. Marett Outstanding Performer Award winner at the conclusion of the NAIA Outdoor Track and Field Championships in Gulf Shores, Ala., after winning both the steeplechase (for the second straight time) and the 5,000-meter run at the national meet. Bernard set the NAIA championship steeplechase record in the preliminaries of the event in 2015.

She also claimed the gold in the steeplechase at the NAIA meet in 2014 and anchored UBC to a victory in the women's 4x800 relay at the NAIA championship in 2013.
