= Taylor Ellis-Watson =

American track and field athlete

Taylor Washington
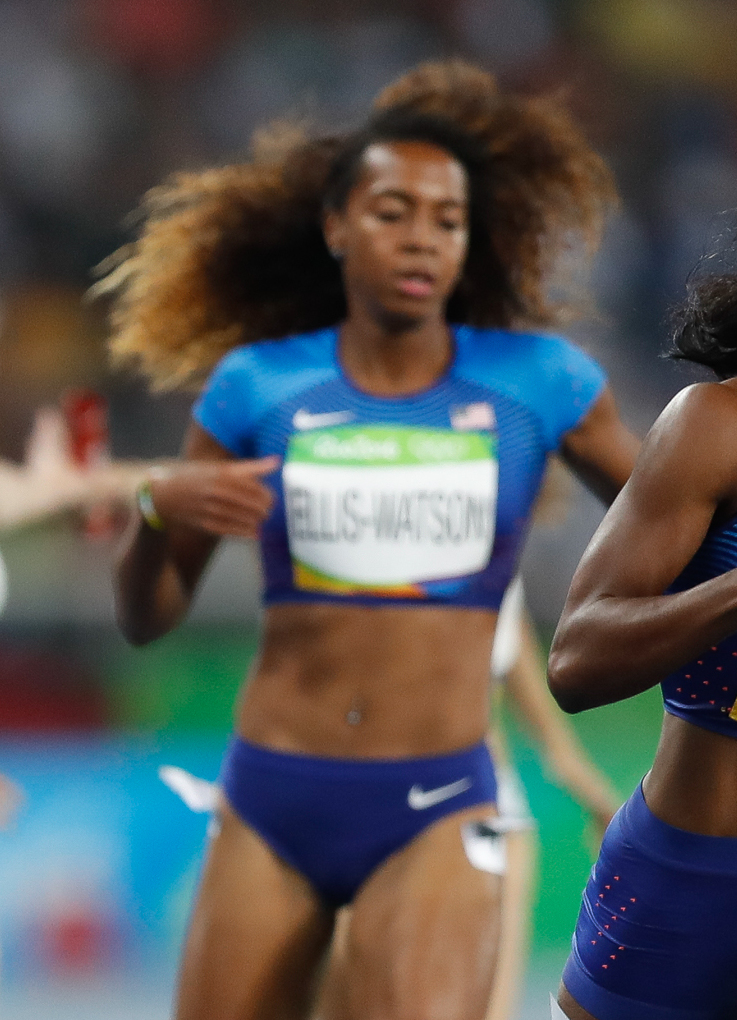
- Washington at the 2016 Summer Olympics

Personal information
- Full name: Taylor Washington
- National team: United States
- Born: Taylor Ellis-Watson; May 6, 1993 (age 33) Philadelphia, Pennsylvania, U.S.
- Height: 6 ft 0 in (1.83 m)
- Weight: 142 lb (64 kg; 10 st 2 lb)

Sport
- Sport: Track and Field
- Event: 400 meters
- College team: Arkansas
- Club: Adidas
- Turned pro: 2016
- Retired: 2018
Medal record
Women's athletics
Representing the United States
Olympic Games
Gold medal – first place	2016 Rio de Janeiro	4 × 400 m relay

Taylor Washington (née Ellis-Watson) is an American track and field athlete. She was a member of the winning relay team for the United States Olympic team in the women's 4 × 400 meter relay for the 2016 Summer Olympics in Rio de Janeiro.

== Early life ==
Taylor Ellis-Watson was born on May 6, 1993, in Philadelphia, Pennsylvania. Ellis-Watson began running at age 12, and she excelled in track as a high school student. In 2011, she graduated from Springside School, which has since been renamed Springside Chestnut Hill Academy.

== Track and field Athletic Career ==
Ellis-Watson first attended college at the University of Pittsburgh where she was named All-Big East Conference in track. After two years, she transferred from Pittsburgh to the University of Arkansas seeking the increased competition that comes at an SEC track school. In November 2013 and December 2014, Ellis-Watson had surgery on her left foot to repair a stress fracture. Ellis-Watson was an 11-time All-American at Arkansas and was part of the school's 2015 indoor track and 2016 outdoor track national championship teams. Although she graduated from college 2015, Ellis-Watson began working towards her post-graduate degree in counseling and continuing to compete in the NCAA through 2016.

At the 2016 Olympic trials in Eugene, Oregon, Ellis-Watson finished fourth in the 400 meters with a personal best time of 50.25. She missed qualifying for the individual 400 meter .08 of a second. The result was still good enough to earn Ellis-Watson a spot on the U.S. 4 × 400 women's relay team for the 2016 Summer Olympics in Rio de Janeiro. At the Olympics, Ellis-Watson ran the second leg of the preliminary round of the 4 × 400 relay with a split of 50.81 seconds. Although Ellis-Watson did not race in the finals, she won gold for being part of the winning relay team.

Former Arkansas women's track and field team captain Taylor Washington (née: Ellis-Watson) was honored at the 2017 NCAA Convention which was held January 18–21, 2017 in Nashville, Tennessee.

Taylor Washington placed 17th in 400 meters in 52.47 at 2017 USA Outdoor Track and Field Championships.

== Personal life ==
As of 2016, Ellis-Watson is engaged to be married to fellow track athlete Wesley Washington. The pair met while Ellis-Watson was a student at the University of Pittsburgh.

== Professional career ==
=== Team USA Track and Field Coaching ===
Coach Taylor Washington, Darryl Woodson, Jeremy Wariner and Kyra Jefferson teamed to coach Team USA at 2025 World Athletics Relays where 4 of the 5 relays qualified for the 2025 World Athletics Championships.

=== NCAA Coaching and Program Management ===
In 2024, coach Taylor Washington returned to University of Arkansas to assist the Razorbacks.

In July 2019, Taylor Washington joined the University of Central Florida athletic staff as coordinator of executive operations.

=== High School Coaching and Program Management ===
In July 2017, Coach Taylor Washington developed many state qualifiers for cross country and track & field at Windermere High School and Montverde Academy in Florida.

=== Ernst & Young ===
In 2021, Washington specialized in program management, organizational change management, and training as a People Advisory Services Consultant at Ernst & Young.
