= Athletics in Jamaica =

Since the early 20th century, Jamaica has won 65 Commonwealth Golds, 40 World Championship Golds and 27 Olympic gold medals in athletics alone. Jamaica has a population of 2.85 million people, making it the 138th most populous country in the world.

== History ==
=== Early times ===
Some of the first noted sprinters of Jamaican origin were Alfred R. Downer and G. C. Foster. Downer was Scottish national champion in the 100, 220, and 440 yards events for three consecutive years from 1893, but later lost his amateur status, preventing him from participating further. Foster attempted to enter the 1908 Summer Olympics, but was prevented from doing so as Jamaica was not yet affiliated to the International Olympic Committee. He later became a noted athletics coach.

Norman Manley, who would later go on to become premier of Jamaica, was an outstanding athlete at Jamaica College, winning six medals in the Jamaican schoolboy championships in 1911, including the 100 yards in 10 seconds, an island schoolboy record not broken until 1952. That time would have put young Manley into the final of that event in both the 1908 and 1912 Olympics.

=== 1930s ===
In 1930, Jamaica entered its first-ever athletics team into an international competition. It was the 1930 Central American and Caribbean Games. Joseph Mackenzie, former student at St. George's College, won a silver medal in the high jump with a jump of 1.75 m becoming Jamaica's first ever international medal winner.

In 1934, Jamaica entered their first ever team into the British Empire Games (now known as the Commonwealth Games) the team won a silver in swimming and Bernard Leopold Prendergast won a bronze in the discus throw with a 40.23m throw.

=== 1940s ===
The first part of the forties was interrupted by the Second World War. 3 years after the war in 1948, led by an African American Joseph J. Yancey Jamaica made their first ever Olympic appearance at the London Olympics and surprised the world by winning 1 gold and two silvers. These medals were won by Arthur Wint and Herbert Mckenley and started a great sprinting tradition. These two men are regarded as the pioneers of Jamaican athletics. In the 400 m final McKenley ran out of steam in the last 100 m and Wint passed him to become Jamaica's first Olympic Gold Medallist. Wint narrowly missed out on a Gold in the 800 m but still went home a hero.

=== 1950s ===
In the 1952 Helsinki Olympics, Jamaican heroes Arthur Wint and Herb Mckenley were back along with George Rhoden and Leslie Laing. Together these four made up the gold medal-winning 4 × 400 m relay team becoming the only team other than the Americans to hold a 4 × 400 m world record by running 3:03.9 in the final. George Rhoden led a Jamaican one-two with Herb Mckenley in the (individual) 400 m and Mckenley won his second silver in the closest 100 m in Olympic history. Wint won another silver in the 800 m. Jamaica finished a remarkable 13th in the medal table ahead of the likes of Japan, Great Britain and Canada.

At the 1954 British Empire and Commonwealth Games, Jamaica won one gold courtesy of Keith Gardner in the 120-yard hurdles. Jamaica sent one sole competitor to the 1956 Olympics in Melbourne. It was Keith Gardner but he failed to get through the first round leaving Jamaica with no medals.

At the 1958 British Empire and Commonwealth Games, Jamaica won a record haul of 4 golds, 2 silvers and 1 bronze. Paul Foreman led a Jamaican one-two with Deryck Taylor in the long jump, Ernest Haisley won gold in high jump and Keith Gardner retained his 120yards hurdle title by setting a new commonwealth record of 14.0 seconds and won another gold in the 100yards.

=== 1960s ===
For the 1960 Olympics, Jamaica, Trinidad and Tobago and Barbados entered a joint team known as the British West Indies Federation (BWI). The team won two bronzes from George Kerr in the 800 m and the men's 4 × 400 m relay team of Kerr, James Wedderburn, Keith Gardner and Malcolm Spence.

At the 1962 British Empire and Commonwealth Games Jamaica won two athletics golds. One in the men's 440 yards from George Kerr and one from the men's 4 × 440 yards relay of Kerr, Laurie Khan, Malcolm Spence and Mel Spence. Kerr then followed up with silver in the 880 yards.

1964: Jamaican did not win a medal but Jamaican came fourth in the women's 200 meter-young 16 years old Una L. Morris; George Kerr-800 meters; and the men's 4 × 100 meters. This is the first time that a Jamaican female so young that was placed in a final. This was the beginning of the Jamaican women's recognition internationally.

The 1966 British Empire and Commonwealth Games were the first to be held in Jamaica and the first outside the "White Commonwealth". Much to the disappointment of the Kingston crowd, Jamaica did not win any gold medals. Carmen Smith and Una Morris became Jamaica's first major female athletics medalists by winning a silver and bronzes respectively. The Jamaican Men's 4x110yards team of Lynnsworth Headley, Mike Fray, Pablo McNeill and Wellesley Clayton also got silver and there were another three bronzes won by the team on the track.

At the 1968 Olympics, Lennox Miller won a silver medal behind record breaking Jim Hines in the 100 m. The Jamaican 4 × 100 m relay team was a huge gold medal prospect as they had the 100 m silver medalist Lennox Miller, they smashed the world record in the heats but Errol Stewart, Mike Fray, Clifton Forbes and Lennox Miller could only manage fourth place in the final and looked on as the Americans broke the world record they had set only a day before. Jamaica left Mexico with a sole silver medal.

=== 1970s ===
In 1970, Jamaica equalled its 1958 record haul in the 1970 British Commonwealth Games of 4 golds 2 silvers and a bronze. Marilyn Neufville won gold for Jamaica in the 400 m after switching to Jamaica from her adopted nation, Great Britain, winning in a world record time of 51.02. A nineteen-year-old Donald Quarrie won two golds by winning the sprint double and led a one-two with Lennox Miller in the 100 m. The men's 4 × 100 m team of Carl Lawson, Don Quarrie, Erroll Stewart and Lennox Miller also won gold.

At the 1972 Olympic Games in München, it was once again Lennox Miller that won the sole medal this time it was bronze. The 1974 British Commonwealth Games were held in Christchurch, New Zealand.

Quarrie retained his Commonwealth Gold Medals. In 1976 Donald Quarrie managed to become Jamaica's first Olympic champion in 24 years when he won the 200 m at the Montreal Olympics. Quarrie also finished second in the 100 m, which earned him a silver medal. In 1978 Donald Quarrie won the 100 m Commonwealth Gold for the third time in a row. The Men's 4 × 400 m relay team of Bertland Cameron, Clive Barriffe, Colin Bradford and Floyd Brown won silver. Colin Bradford won bronze in the 200 m and another bronze with the Men's 4 × 100 m team of Errol Quarrie, Floyd Brown and Oliver Heywood.

=== 1980s ===
At the 1980 Moscow Olympics, Jamaica won a bronze medal in cycling and won two more bronze medals in athletics. Those medals came thanks to Donald Quarrie in the 200 m and 20-year-old Merlene Ottey who became the first female athlete from an English speaking Caribbean island to win an Olympic medal after winning bronze in the 200 m. The 1982 Commonwealth Games was where Ottey won her first gold medal, in the 200 m by setting a new commonwealth record of 22.19 seconds. She also won silver in the 100 m and helped the Jamaican women's 4 × 100 m team of Cathy Rattray-Williams, Grace Jackson and Leileth Hodges to bronze. Bertland "Bert" Cameron became 400 m Commonwealth champion winning him Jamaica Sportsman of the Year.

In 1983, the first ever World Championships in Athletics were held. This gave Jamaican athletes more opportunities to win major medals. Bert Cameron became the first ever 400 m World Champion.

Merlene Ottey also got silver in the 200 m. The women's 4 × 100 m team (Leleith Hodges, Jacqueline Pusey, Juliet Cuthbert, and Merlene Ottey) also won a bronze medal.

At the Los Angeles Olympics in 1984, Merlene Ottey-Page won two bronzes (in the 100 and 200 m). The men's 4 × 100 m team of Al Lawrence, Greg Meghoo, Donald Quarrie and Ray Stewart won Olympic silver as well. Jamaica boycotted the 1986 Commonwealth Games over Margaret Thatcher's stance on apartheid era South Africa. They were however at the 1987 World Athletics Championships. There were no gold medallists but Raymond Stewart won silver in the 100 m and Merlene Ottey won two more bronzes (again in the 100 m and 200 m) to put in her medal cabinet. The Men's 4 × 100 m team of John Mair, Andrew Smith, Clive Wright and Raymond Stewart won another bronze to add to the medal tally. At the 1988 Olympics in Seoul Grace Jackson won one silver in the 200 m.

So, too, did the men's 4 × 400 m relay team of Howard Davis (Earl Mellis), Devon Morris, Winthrop Graham and Bert Cameron.

=== 1990s ===
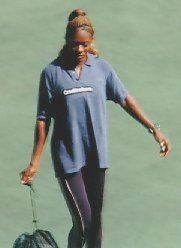
Merlene Ottey, former 200 m World Champion.

The early nineties was a successful time for Jamaican athletics with Merlene Ottey on top form. The decade started with the Commonwealth Games in Auckland. Ottey won the sprint double just like Quarrie had done 26 years before her. Both men's relay teams won bronzes. The 4 × 100 m team featured Clive Wright, John Mair, Raymond Stewart and Wayne Watson. The 4 × 400 m team featured Wright, Devon Morris, Howard Burnett and Mair. Next up was the 1991 World Championships in Japan the only gold was the women's 4 × 100 m team of Dahlia Duhaney, Juliet Cuthbert, Beverly McDonald and Ottey.

Winthrop Graham managed silver in the 400 m hurdles and Ottey once again won two bronzes in the 100 m and 200 m, and the men's 4 × 400 m team of Patrick O'Connor, Devon Morris, Winthrop Graham and Seymour Fagan also won bronze giving Jamaica a record World championship medal tally of 1 gold 1 silver and 3 bronzes.

The next Olympics were in 1992 in Barcelona and Jamaica had many athletes capable of winning the Olympic Gold medal but none rose to the occasion. Cuthbert came close but could only manage two silvers (in the 100 m and 200 m). Winthrop Graham won silver in the 400 m hurdles behind record breaking Kevin Young. Ottey won two more Olympic Bronzes (that was in the 100 m and 200 m behind younger teammate Cuthbert) and many were starting to say she should retire.

A year later at the 1993 World Championships, Ottey proved the critics wrong by becoming World 200 m Champion at the age of 33. She then won silver in the 100 m. She would return to earn a bronze medal on the women's 4 × 100 m team (Michelle Freeman, Juliet Campbell, Nikole Mitchell, and Ottey). Also Winthrop Graham in the 400 m hurdles and Sandie Richards in the women's 400 m, won bronze medals.

At the 1994 Commonwealth Games two young athletes were the only gold medallists 25-year-old Michelle Freeman won gold in the sprint hurdles and 22-year-old Inez Turner won gold in the 800 m. Ottey retained her 200 m crown at the 1995 world championships in Gothenburg. Once again she won 100 m silver. At this championships Jamaica achieved another record haul of 1 gold 4 silvers and 2 bronzes. This included silvers for James Beckford in the Long Jump, the men's 4 × 400 m team (Michael McDonald, Davian Clarke, Danny McFarlane, and Greg Haughton), and the women's 4 × 100 m team (Duhaney, Cuthbert, Beverly McDonald, and Ottey), as well as, bronzes for Greg Haughton in the men's 400 m and Deon Hemmings in the women's 400 m hurdles.

Many believed the 1996 Olympics in Atlanta would be Ottey's last as she was then 36. Ottey won silver in the closest women's Olympic 100 m in history as she and Gail Devers were given the same time of 10.94 but the judges gave it to Devers on the photo finish. Like Herb Mckenley 44 years before her this was the closest Ottey ever was to an individual Olympic gold medal. She also won a silver in the 200 and showed no signs of stopping. At this Olympics Ottey's achievements were overshadowed by Jamaica's first Olympic champion since Donald Quarrie and first female Olympic champion. Her name was Deon Hemmings and she won the 400 m hurdles in a new Olympic record of 52.82.

Beckford also managed a long jump silver medal. The women's 4 × 100 m team (Michelle Freeman, Cuthbert, Nikole Mitchell, Ottey, Gillian Russell, and Andrea Lloyd) and the men's 4 × 400 m team (Michael McDonald, Greg Haughton, Roxbert Martin, Davian Clarke, Dennis Blake, and Garth Robinson) both won bronze medals as well, so that Jamaica ended with 1 gold, 3 silver and 2 bronze.

The next year at the 1997 world championships, Jamaica won no golds but managed 3 silvers and 4 bronzes. Alexandra "Sandie" Richards won silver in the 400 m. Olympic champion Hemmings won silver in the 400 m hurdles and the women's 4 × 100 m team of Beverly McDonald, Merlene Frazer, Cuthbert and Beverly Grant won silver. The ageless wonder Ottey won bronze in the 200 m, Michelle Freeman also won bronze in the 100 m hurdles, while both 4 × 400 m men's (Michael McDonald, Greg Haughton, Danny McFarlane, and Davian Clarke) and women's (Inez Turner, Lorraine Fenton, Hemmings, and Sandie Richards) teams won bronze medals however after USA's gold was stripped because it included drug cheat Antonio Pettigrew. Jamaica were promoted to silver medal position making their revised total 4 silvers and 4 bronzes.

In Kuala Lumpur for the 1998 Commonwealth Games Jamaica managed 4 golds Gillian Russell set a new commonwealth record of 12.7 seconds in the 100 m hurdles. Sandie Richards won gold in the 400 m with a new commonwealth record of 50.17. Dinsdale Morgan won gold in the 400 m Hurdles and the men's 4 × 400 m team of Davian Clarke, Gregory Haughton, Michael McDonald and Roxbert Martin won gold in a new Commonwealth record to cap off a successful games.

The 1999 World Championships were the last championships before the new millennium. Jamaica won no golds but Beverly McDonald won silver in the 200 m. The rest of the team won 5 bronzes including Hemmings in the 400 m hurdles, Fenton in the 400 m, Merlene Frazer in the 200 m, the women's 4 × 100 m team (Aleen Bailey, Merlene Frazer, Beverly McDonald, and Peta-Gaye Dowdie), and the men's 4 × 400 m team (Michael McDonald, Greg Haughton, Danny McFarlane, and Davian Clarke). The bronze awarded to the Jamaican men's 4 × 400 m team was later upgraded to a silver medal after the US team, that originally won the event, admitted to using performance-enhancing drugs.

=== Early 2000s ===
There was a lot of controversy before the Millennium Olympics in Sydney which almost resulted in Jamaica being thrown out of the competition. The reason was that there were protests in the Olympic village because they believed Merlene Ottey had bullied herself into the team as she had finished fourth in the trials but made the team ahead of Peta-Gaye Dowdie who finished ahead of her in the trials. Jamaica won no gold medals at the 2000 Olympics but Lorraine Fenton in the 400 m, defending Olympic champion Deon Hemmings in the 400 m hurdles, the women's 4 × 400 m relay team with Sandie Richards, Catherine Scott, Deon Hemmings, and Fenton, and the women's 4 × 100 m team featuring Tanya Lawrence, Veronica Campbell, Beverly McDonald and 40-year-old Merlene Ottey, all won silvers. This made Ottey the oldest ever athletics medallist. Greg Haughton and Lawrence won bronzes in the 400 m and 100 m respectively while the men's 4 × 400 m team (Michael Blackwood, Greg Haughton, Christopher Williams, Danny McFarlane, Sanjay Ayre, and Michael McDonald) also copped a bronze medal. Jamaica ended that games with a tally of 4 silver and 3 bronzes. A year later Ottey started competing for Slovenia because of the 2000 controversy. The controversy continued after the 2000 Olympics after it was revealed that America's Marion Jones had taken performance-enhancing drugs. All her medals were stripped. This gained Lawrence a 100 m silver medal, Merlene Ottey a 100 m bronze and 200 m bronze for Beverly McDonald. This made Jamaica's revised medal total 5 silvers and 4 bronzes.

The 2001 World Championships was next and Jamaica won gold thanks to the women's 4 × 400 m team of Sandie Richards, Catherine Scott, Debbie-Ann Parris, and Fenton's world leading run. Christopher Williams and Fenton both won silvers in the 200 m and 400 m respectively, while Greg Haughton in the men's 400 m, the men's 4 × 400 m team (Brandon Simpson, Christopher Williams, Greg Haughton, and Danny McFarlane), and the women's 4 × 100 m team (Juliet Campbell, Merlene Frazer, Beverly McDonald, and Astia Walker) won bronzes. Here Jamaica finished with a tally of 1 gold, 2 silver and 3 bronze.

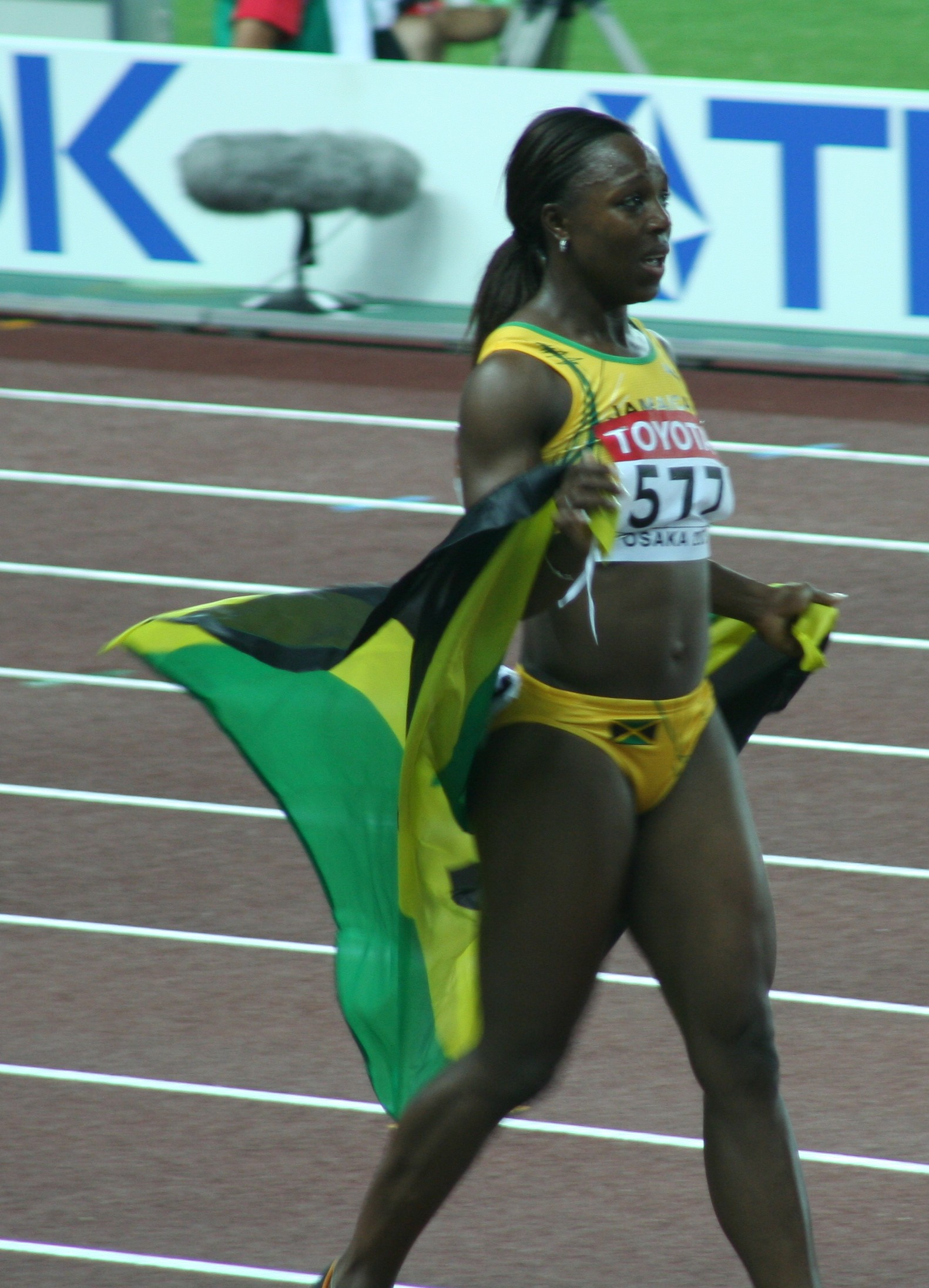
Veronica Campbell-Brown, the 2004 and 2008 Olympic 200m Champion and 2007 World 100m Champion.

2002 was a record breaking year for Jamaica as they won a record haul of medals at the Commonwealth Games. In total they won 4 gold medals 6 silvers and 7 bronzes. Claston Bernard won the Decathlon gold. Elva Goldbourne leaped to long jump gold. Blackwood sped to 400 m gold and Lacena Golding-Clarke glided to 100 m hurdles gold.

2003 was disappointing for Jamaican athletics; they won no golds at the world championships but James Beckford in the long jump, Fenton in the 400 m, Brigitte Foster-Hylton in the 100 m hurdles and the men's 4 × 400 m team (Brandon Simpson, Danny McFarlane, Davian Clarke and Blackwood) all won silver. Blackwood's bronze in the men's 400 m and the 4 × 400 m women's team (Allison Beckford, Fenton, Ronetta Smith, and Sandie Richards) also won bronze to round out the medal haul of 4 silver and 2 bronze.

The 2004 Olympics in Athens was lit up by Jamaican golden girl Veronica Campbell, first she won bronze in the 100 m, next she won gold in the 200 m to become the first Caribbean woman to win an individual sprint event at the Olympics, then she anchored the 4 × 100 m team that included Lawrence, Aleen Bailey and Sherone Simpson to a famous victory. Danny McFarlane then won a surprise silver medal in the 400 m hurdles, and the 4 × 400 m women's team (Novlene Williams, Michelle Burgher, Nadia Davy, Sandie Richards, and Ronetta Smith) got bronze, for a total of 5 medals – 2 gold, 1 silver, and 2 bronze to Jamaica.

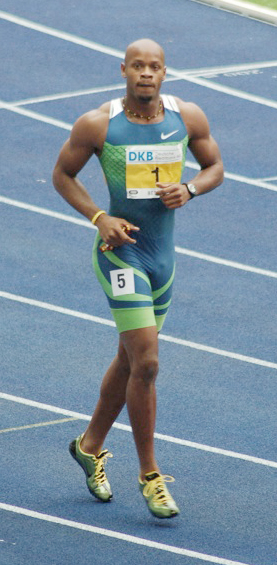
Asafa Powell, former 100 m World Record Holder.

In 2005 at the world championships, Jamaica received a record haul of medals they won 1 gold medal 5 silvers and 2 bronzes. Trecia Smith won the gold in the triple jump, the first ever by a Jamaican in a field event at the global level. Veronica Campbell in the women's 100 m, Michael Frater in the men's 100 m, Delloreen Ennis-London in the 100 m hurdles, and the women's 4 × 100 m (Daniele Browning, Sherone Simpson, Aleen Bailey, and Veronica Campbell) and 4 × 400 m (Shericka Williams, Novlene Williams, Ronetta Smith, and Fenton) teams, all won silver medals. Brigitte Foster-Hylton finished behind Ennis-London for bronze in the 100 m hurdles, and the men's 4 × 400 m team (Sanjay Ayre, Brandon Simpson, Lansford Spence, and Davian Clarke) also finished with bronze. With an overall tally of 8 medals, Jamaica finished 5th in the medal table ahead of Great Britain and Germany.

More records were broken at the 2006 Commonwealth Games as Jamaica got 10 golds more than double the previous record, making the island's medal haul second only to host country Australia in athletics. Jamaica won all the sprint events – 100 metres, 200 metres, sprint hurdles for sprint relays for both men and women, becoming only the third country after Australia in 1950 and the US in the 1984 Olympics to complete a sweep of all sprint events at a major athletics championship. In total they won 10 gold medals 4 silvers 8 bronzes. Gold medallists were the then World 100 m record-holder Asafa Powell in the men's 100 m, Sheri-Ann Brooks in the women's 100 m, Maurice Wignall in the 110 m hurdles, Trecia Smith in the triple jump, Tanto Campbell in the Men's seated discus throw, Omar Brown in the 200 m, Brigitte Foster-Hylton in the 100 m hurdles, Men's 4 × 100 m team of Ainsley Waugh, Asafa Powell, Chris Williams and Michael Frater, and the Women's 4 × 100 m team of Daniele Browning, Peta Dowdie, Sheri-Ann Brooks and Sherone Simpson.

2007 was yet another record breaking year for Jamaican athletics as there was another record haul at the 2007 World Championships, and from a field of 204 countries, Jamaica placed fourth in the overall medal count. Veronica Campbell won gold in the 100 m but had to settle for a silver in the 200 m. This championships also saw the emergence of a young Usain Bolt achieving a silver in the Men's 200 m while Asafa Powell could only manage a bronze medal in the Men's 100 m. Maurice Smith won silver in the Decathlon, and both the 4 × 100 m Men's (Marvin Anderson, Usain Bolt, Nesta Carter, and Asafa Powell) and Women's (Sheri-Ann Brooks, Kerron Stewart, Simone Facey, and Veronica Campbell) sprint relay teams finished with silvers, as well as the 4 × 400 m women's team (Shericka Williams, Shereefa Lloyd, Davita Prendergast, and Novlene Williams). Delloreen Ennis-London and Novlene Williams copped bronzes in the 100 m hurdles and 400 m respectively. In total the team won 1 gold medal 6 silver and 3 bronze.

In 2008, 21-year-old Usain Bolt proved Jamaica's dominance in the 100 m. Although it was not his favoured event, he ran a time of 9.76, becoming second on the all-time list. Then, on 1 June 2008, he ran 9.72, breaking the 100 m world record held by compatriot Asafa Powell (9.74 secs) by two hundredths of a second. This meant that the two fastest men in the world were Jamaicans, and it set up a thrilling contest between World 100 m and 200 m Champion, Tyson Gay of the United States, and the two fastest men in history.

=== Beijing 2008: "Sprint Dominance" ===
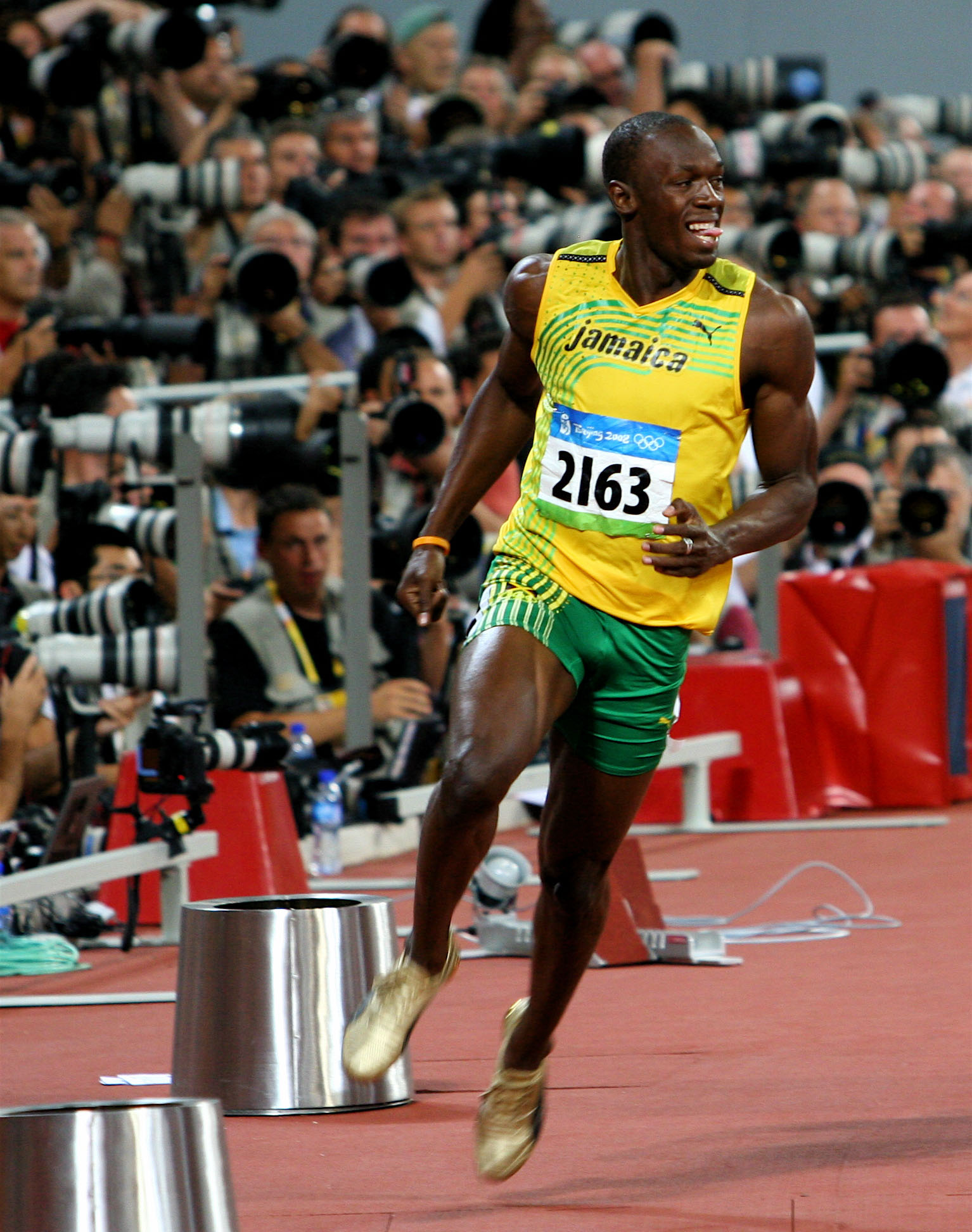
Usain Bolt, Olympic Champion in the 100 m and 200 m (2008–2016) and world record holder in the 100 m, 200 m and 4 × 100 m.

The first week of the 2008 Summer Olympics in Beijing, China was quiet for Jamaica, but on Saturday 16 August, Usain Bolt won their first of many gold medals by smashing his own 100 m World Record by 0.03 seconds in the final, recording a time of 9.69 s. In the process he became the first man to go under 9.70 seconds. The feat was made more remarkable by the fact that around 15–20 metres from the line, Bolt slowed down and started to celebrate early by lowering his hands and slapping his chest. There was no wind to either hinder or help his progress (+0.0 m/s), also it turned out that one of his shoelaces came undone during the race. Asafa Powell and Michael Frater who were also in the race for Jamaica, finished fifth and sixth respectively.

The next day was the women's 100 m which was expected to be Jamaica vs the United States. Jamaican Kerron Stewart had looked impressive in the earlier rounds, but in the final, Shelly-Ann Fraser {now Shelly-Ann Fraser-Pryce} finished well ahead of the field with Stewart and Sherone Simpson getting joint silver medals after recording identical times. This made Jamaica the first country to get a clean sweep of the medals in the women's 100 m at the Olympic Games.

On Tuesday, 19 August, Shericka Williams won silver in the women's 400 m by passing the favourite Sanya Richards (who herself is Jamaican- born), on the home straight. This medal gave Jamaica a tally of 2 golds, 3 silvers and no bronzes. However, there was much more to come from the Jamaicans.

On 20 August, Bolt was back to compete in the final of the 200 m sprint. Before the race, there was a lot of speculation over whether he could break Michael Johnson's 12-year-old World Record of 19.32 seconds. In the race, Bolt had a good start and came down the home straight with a considerable lead, continuing to pull away from the rest of the field. He passed the line in a new world-record time of 19.30 seconds. Giving Jamaica a third gold and making him the first man to complete the sprint double since Carl Lewis in 1984, and the first to do so in world record times. He also became the second Jamaican to win two gold medals at a single Olympic Games, after George Rhoden in 1952. The same day, Melaine Walker won the women's 400 m hurdles event in a new Olympic Record time of 52.64 seconds, breaking the old mark set in 1996 by Deon Hemmings.

On 21 August, Jamaica completed a clean-sweep of all the individual sprints (100 and 200 m), and confirmed the nation's dominance when Veronica Campbell-Brown successfully defended her Olympic 200 m title winning the event ahead of Allyson Felix of the United States, and Kerron Stewart who took bronze.

On 22 August, the Jamaican women's and men's 4 × 100 m relay teams took to the track. Their chances for victory were boosted when both American 4 × 100 m teams were knocked-out in the heats. The women's team of Shelly-Ann Fraser, Sherone Simpson, Kerron Stewart and Veronica Campbell-Brown were the first on the track, going reasonably well until the third changeover between Simpson and Stewart, which was poorly timed and resulted in the disqualification of the entire team. However, the men's team consisting of Nesta Carter, Michael Frater, Usain Bolt and Asafa Powell were next. Their own runs went without any problems, Powell received the baton from Bolt well ahead of the other teams, crossing the line in both the fastest electronically timed anchor run ever (8.70 seconds), and an overall world-record time of 37.10 seconds. This was a full 0.30 seconds quicker than the previous world record of 37.40 set by the Americans. Usain Bolt now had three gold medals and three World Records to his credit, and Jamaica had won 5 of the 6 available gold medals in the sprints, the only country to achieve this feat other than the American teams of 1984 and 1988. This made Jamaicans characterize this Olympic Games as the "JAlympics".

Jamaica's last medal of the games came in the women's 4 × 400 m relay. The team of Shericka Williams, Shereefa Lloyd, Rosemarie Whyte and Novlene Williams claimed bronze. This finally gave Jamaica a medal tally of 6 golds, 3 silvers and 2 bronzes, smashing the previous national record that was set in 1952, and finishing 13th in the medal table of all sports. In athletics, Jamaica placed third in the overall medal count.

=== Late 2000s ===
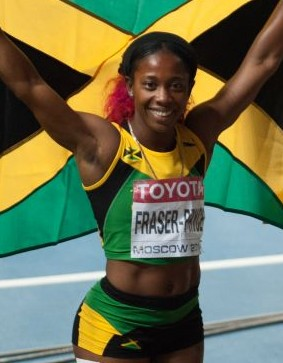
Shelly-Ann Fraser-Pryce, Olympic 100 m champion (2008, 2012), five-time world 100 m champion (2009, 2013, 2015, 2019, 2022) and 2013 world 200 m champion.

Before the 2009 World Championships in Berlin the Jamaican team was hit by two scandals, a drug scandal with five athletes failing drug tests and the Jamaican athletic association threatening to throw out members of Stephen Francis's MVP track club which includes Asafa Powell, Brigitte Foster-Hylton, Shericka Williams and Shelly-Ann Fraser after they refused to attend the pre-competition Jamaican training camp. However, this didn't hinder superstar Jamaican triple Olympic champion Usain Bolt in the 100 m on 16 August winning gold by smashing his previous world record of 9.69 by 0.11 seconds and running an astonishing 9.58 seconds beating American Tyson Gay by two metres despite Gay running a national record of 9.71. Fellow Jamaican former world record holder Asafa Powell won bronze in a season's best of 9.84. Bolt broke the 100 m world record by the biggest margin ever in the modern era and became the first human to go under 9.6 seconds.

The very next day on 17 August was the final of the women's 100 m. Four Jamaicans had made the final (Aleen Bailey, Shelly-Ann Fraser, Kerron Stewart and Veronica Campbell-Brown) and although the possible 1-2-3-4 failed to materialise Shelly-Ann Fraser sprinted to World gold in 10.73 seconds breaking the great Merlene Ottey 13-year-old national record. Kerron Stewart closed quickly in final stages to get her first World Championship silver in 10.75 seconds equalling her personal best. This meant that after day 3 of the Championships Jamaica were top of the medal table.

On 18 August in the final of the women's 400 m Shericka Williams followed her Olympic silver with World silver in a personal best time of 49.32 behind Jamaican-born Sanya Richards.

On day 5 of the championships Jamaicans Brigitte Foster-Hylton and Delloreen Ennis-London made the 100 m hurdles final and Brigitte Foster-Hylton finally delivered on her potential and winning her first world title in 12.51 at the age of 34 with Ennis-London getting bronze with 12.55 also at the age of 35. This brought the Jamaican medal tally to 3 golds 2 silvers and 2 bronzes.

The next day was the night of the women's 400 m hurdles final and the men's 200 m final. First up was the women's 400 m hurdles with Olympic champion Melaine Walker despite not being favourite Walker flew to a new championship record of 52.42 to win the gold in the second fastest time in history. This took Jamaica above United States at the top of the medal table for the second time of the championships.

On the same night Usain Bolt lined up for the 200 m final despite looking fatigued for the preliminary rounds in the final he ran a world record time of 19.19 seconds meaning that for everyone of his golds he had broken the world record and also that in Berlin he had knocked more than a tenth of a second of both his previous world records. The final was the first to have five men going under 20 seconds but despite this Bolt was two metres ahead of the field coming of the bend and just kept on running.

On 21 August double Olympic champion Veronica Campbell-Brown couldn't replicate Bolt's 200 m success as she won silver in the 200 m final behind American Allyson Felix in a time of 22.35.

On day eight of the Championships was the day of the sprint relays and the women's 4 × 100 m was without United States meaning that Jamaica were clear favourites as long as they got the baton round which is what they did as the team of Simone Facey 200 m finalist, Shelly-Ann Fraser 100 m gold medalist, Aleen Bailey 100 m finalist and Kerron Stewart 100 m silver medalist on the final leg ran 42.06 to win Jamaica's 6th gold medal. The male quartet were seemingly inspired by their female counterparts as the team of Steve Mullings 200 m finalist, Michael Frater 100 m semi-finalist, Usain Bolt Double World Champion, Triple Olympic champion and Triple world record holder and on the last leg Asafa Powell world bronze medalist as he anchored the team to a new championship record of 37.31.

This also meant Jamaica had seven championship golds doubling the tally of all previous championships altogether with one more event to go.

Jamaica's final medal came in women's 4 × 400 m relay as the quartet of Rosemarie Whyte, Novlene Williams-Mills, Shereefa Lloyd and Shericka Williams comfortably beat the Russia team to win a silver medal meaning Jamaica finished the Championships 2nd on the medal table with 7 golds, 4 silvers and 2 bronzes.

=== 2010s ===
Many of Jamaica's superstars didn't attend the 2010 Commonwealth Games in Delhi mainly because of it being held outside of the traditional athletics season. The weakened Jamaica team came back from Delhi with 2 golds, 4 silvers and 1 bronze. The golds came from Lerone Clarke in the men's 100m winning despite being only the 8th ranked Jamaican in the world that year and Trecia Smith retained her women's triple jump title from Melbourne with a jump of 14.19m. The four silvers came from Dorian Scott in the men's shot put, Sheeree Francis in the women's high jump, Lansford Spence in the men's 200 m and the Men's 4x100 m relay team. Nickiesha Wilson won bronze in the women's 400 m hurdles.

The 2011 World Championships were held in Daegu, South Korea. Usain Bolt was favourite was defend to his titles from Berlin but in the 100 m Final on 28 August he controversially false started allowing training partner Yohan Blake to win in 9.92 seconds. Veronica Campbell-Brown finally won the women's 200 m World title on 2 September when she ran a season's best of 22.22 to beat reigning champion Allyson Felix into bronze. Usain Bolt redeemed himself in the men's 200 m final on 3 September when he won gold in a world-leading time of 19.40. 2009 World 400 m Hurdles Champion. Melaine Walker had to settle for silver in Daegu behind American Lashinda Demus in a season's best of 52.73. The Jamaica team won a medal in all 4 relays with a bronze in the Men's 4x400 m relay, a silver in the Women's 4x400 m and 4x100 m and finally the men's 4x100 m relay team (Dexter Lee, Nesta Carter, Michael Frater, Yohan Blake, Usain Bolt) retained their title winning in a new world record time of 37.04. Jamaica's final medal tally was 4 golds 4 silvers and 1 bronze leaving them 4th on the medal table behind USA, Kenya and Russia.

At the Brussels Diamond League Final on 19 September, new 100 m World Champion Yohan Blake ran 19.26 which was a world leading time and the second fastest time in history, just 7 hundreds outside Usain Bolt's Berlin world record and it was over half a second faster than Blake's previous best of 19.78.

=== London 2012 Olympics ===
Jamaica's first medals of the London 2012 Olympics were in the women's 100m final on Saturday 4 August. Shelly-Ann Fraser-Pryce became the third woman in history and the first Jamaican to retain the 100m title as she won in 10.75 with Veronica Campbell-Brown winning her 6th Olympic medal as she took bronze.

Reigning triple Olympic Champion Usain Bolt's first final was the men's 100m on 5 August despite being Olympic champion and world record holder many doubted Bolt's form and fitness as he had come second in the 100m and 200m at the Jamaican Championships to his training partner the world 100m champion Yohan Blake. Despite the doubters, Bolt blazed to gold in 9.63 breaking his own Olympic record with Blake taking the silver in an equal personal best of 9.75. The win meant Bolt became the second man in history to defend the Olympic 100m title.

Veronica Campbell-Brown was attempting to become the woman to win three athletics golds in a row in the women's 200m final however it was the double Olympic 100m champion Shelly-Ann Fraser-Pryce that was Jamaica's only medalist in the event as she won silver behind Allyson Felix of USA in a personal best of 22.09, Veronica Campbell-Brown came fourth. Later that evening Jamaica won a shock bronze as Hansle Parchment set a national record of 13.12 in the Men's 110 hurdles winning Jamaica's first Olympic medal in the event.

The men's 200m final was on 9 August this was the second clash between training partners Bolt and Blake but once again Usain Bolt took the gold in a world-leading time of 19.32 leading a historic Jamaican 1-2-3 which they had never before achieved in the 200m with Yohan Blake taking silver in a season's best and Warren Weir taking bronze in a personal best of 19.84. Usain Bolt became the first man to defend both the 100m and 200m titles and won his 5th Olympic gold medal.

Jamaica won their 10th Olympic medal of the London Olympics in the women's 4 × 100 m relay as the Jamaica squad (Shelly-Ann Fraser-Pryce, Sherone Simpson, Veronica Campbell-Brown, Kerron Stewart, Samantha Henry-Robinson*, Schillonie Calvert*) won silver in a national record of 41.41 behind the world record breaking USA team.

On the final day of the track athletics program at the 2012 Olympics Jamaica won 2 more medals. In the women's 4 × 400 m relay Jamaica (Christine Day, Rosemarie Whyte, Shericka Williams, Novlene Williams-Mills, Shereefa Lloyd*) won bronze behind the US and Russia in a season's best 3:20.95. In the men's 4 × 100 m relay Jamaica were defending champions as well as reigning world champions and world record holders, the team (Kemar Bailey-Cole*, Nesta Carter, Michael Frater, Yohan Blake, Usain Bolt) won gold in a new world record time of 36.84 seconds. They did it without former 100 world-record holder and the third Jamaican finalist in 100 metres in this Olympics, Asafa Powell. Originally tabbed to be a part of this team, Asafa suffered a groin injury in the 100 metres final that prevented him from running the relay. Bolt gained his 3rd Gold of the games and his 6th in Olympic history. Jamaica ended the games with 4 golds, 4 silvers and 4 bronzes finishing 18th on the medal table their second most successful games after Beijing 2008 although they won more medals.

=== 2013–2019 ===
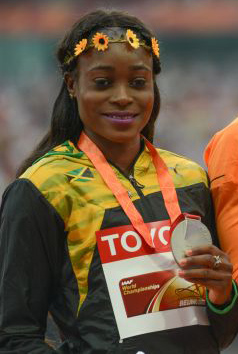
Elaine Thompson-Herah, the fastest woman alive and the 2016 and 2020 Olympic champion in both the 100m and 200m.

The 2013 World Athletics Championships were held in Moscow, Russia. Jamaica's star sprinters Usain Bolt and Shelly-Ann Fraser-Pryce both won three golds (100m, 200m, 4 × 100 m) becoming the most successful athletes of the championships. For Bolt it was his second 100m World Gold after he missed out in 2011 due to a false start, and his third consecutive 200m World Gold leading a 1–2 with Warren Weir taking silver. This brought Bolt up to eight World Championship Golds making him the most successful athlete in the Championships history (a record he would hold until 2019). This was the second major championships after the London 2012 Olympics that Shelly-Ann Fraser-Pryce was attempting the sprint double, and she was the first woman to complete the double since Germany's Katrin Krabbe, 22 years previously and the first woman ever to sweep the 100m, 200m and 4 × 100 m relay.

Behind Bolt in the Men's 100m, Nesta Carter won bronze winning his first individual global outdoor medal. Carter, Bolt, Nickel Ashmeade, Kemar Bailey-Cole, Oshane Bailey* formed Jamaica's gold medal-winning Men's 4 × 100 m relay team. In the Women's 4 × 100 m Jamaica won gold with a Championship Record, National Record and World Lead 41.29, which at the time was the second fastest time in history behind the World Record. The team consisted of Carrie Russell, Kerron Stewart, Schillonie Calvert, Shelly-Ann Fraser-Pryce, and Sheri-Ann Brooks who ran in the heats. Jamaica also won silver in the Men's 4 × 400 m (Rusheen McDonald, Edino Steele, Omar Johnson, Javon Francis and Javere Bell*), and bronze in the women's 400m (Stephenie Ann McPherson). Jamaica finished the championships 2nd on the medal table behind the US with 6 golds, 2 silvers and 5 bronzes, Jamaica's strongest performance since 2009 and an equal-highest medal table finish.

At the 2014 World Indoor Championships in Sopot, Poland Shelly-Ann Fraser-Pryce won Jamaica's solitary gold in the Women's 60m with a World Lead 6.98. Jamaica won silvers in the Women's 400m (Kaliese Spencer) and the Women's 4 × 400 m relay (Patricia Hall, Anneisha McLaughlin, Spencer, Stephenie Ann McPherson, Verone Chambers* and Natoya Goule*). Jamaica also won two bronzes in the Women's Triple Jump (Kimberly Williams) and the Men's 4 × 400 m Relay (Errol Nolan, Alodin Fothergill, Akheem Gauntlett, Edino Steele, Dane Hyatt* and Jermaine Brown*). Jamaica finished 6th on the medal table, their best performance since 2004.

As has become commonplace in recent Commonwealth Games, Jamaica's team was not full-strength in Glasgow 2014 however despite this Jamaica dominated the athletics programme coming 2nd on the medal table behind Kenya with 10 golds, 3 silvers and 6 bronzes. Jamaica got clean sweeps in the Men's 200m (Rasheed Dwyer – gold, Warren Weir -silver, Jason Livermore – bronze) and Women's 400m (Stephenie Ann McPherson, Novlene Williams-Mills and Christine Day). In the Men's 100m Kemar Bailey-Cole became Commonwealth champion with Nickel Ashmeade taking bronze. Jamaica also took gold and bronze in the Women's 400m hurdles with Kaliese Spencer and Janieve Russell. Games Records were set during golds in the: Men's 4 × 100 m relay (Livermore, Bailey-Cole, Ashmeade, Usain Bolt, Kimmari Roach* and Julian Forte*); Women's 4 × 100 m Relay (Kerron Stewart, Veronica Campbell-Brown, Schillonie Calvert, Shelly-Ann Fraser-Pryce and Elaine Thompson*); Women's 4 × 400 m Relay (Day, Williams-Mills, Anastasia le-Roy, McPherson, Russell* and Shericka Williams*) and the Men's Shot Put (O'Dayne Richards). Jamaica's other golds were in the Men's 110m hurdles (Andrew Riley), and the Women's Triple Jump (Kimberly Williams). In the Women's 100m, Jamaica won silver (Campbell-Brown) and bronze (Stewart). Jamaica also won bronze in the Men's discus (Jason Morgan). This was Jamaica's best Commonwealth Games performance in athletics since 2006. Jamaica's overall Commonwealth Games tally (including medals in swimming and netball), equalled Jamaica's best ever performance in 2006.

The 2015 World Championships were in Beijing, China the same location as Jamaica's record Olympic performance. Usain Bolt as in 2009 and 2013 won three golds in the Men's 100m, 200m and 4 × 100 m setting world leads in the 200m and 4 × 100 m. In the 200m it was Bolt's fourth consecutive gold medal, and the fifth consecutive championships he had medalled in the event and for the 100m it was his third world title. The Men's 4 × 100 m gold medal-winning team consisted of Nesta Carter, Asafa Powell, Nickel Ashmeade, Bolt and Rasheed Dwyer*. Shelly-Ann Fraser-Pryce added two more gold medals to her World Championship haul winning a third World gold in the women's 100m and also winning the Women's 4 × 100 m relay along with Veronica Campbell-Brown, Natasha Morrison, Elaine Thompson, Sherone Simpson* and Kerron Stewart*. Jamaica also won a surprise gold in the Women's 100m Hurdles through Danielle Williams and gold in the Women's 4 × 400 m Relay (Christine Day, Shericka Jackson, Stephenie Ann McPherson, Novlene Williams-Mills, Anastasia Le-Roy* and Chrisann Gordon*) inflicting the USA's first World Championship defeat in the event in 10 years. In the Women's 200m, Elaine Thompson won silver in her first ever major championships with a 21.66 PB and the multiple World and Olympic gold medallist Veronica Campbell-Brown took bronze. In the Men's 110m hurdles Olympic bronze medallist Hansle Parchment won silver, and in the Men's Shot Put Commonwealth champion O'Dayne Richards won bronze in a new Jamaican Record 21.69m to win Jamaica's first global medal in the event. In the Women's 400m Jackson won bronze. Jamaica's 7 golds, 2 silvers and 3 bronzes earned them second on the medal table behind Kenya (notably above the traditionally dominant USA), and it was Jamaica's best ever World Championship performance since 2009.

At the 2016 World Indoor Championships in Portland, USA, Jamaica won gold in the Men's 60m Hurdles with Omar McLeod. Former 100m World Record holder Asafa Powell won silver in the Men's 60m and World 200m silver medallist Elaine Thompson won bronze in the Women's 60m. Jamaica were 4th on the medal table.

At the Rio 2016 Olympics, the Usain Bolt cemented his legacy by becoming the first athlete ever to do the sprint double in three consecutive Olympics. He was also part of the gold medal-winning Men's 4 × 100 m Relay team along with Asafa Powell, Yohan Blake, Nickel Ashmeade, Jevaughn Minzie*and Kemar Bailey-Cole*. This was Bolt's final Olympics and his eight Olympic Gold Medal, making him Jamaica's most successful Olympic athlete and second only to Carl Lewis as the most successful Olympic track and field athlete ever. He has six individual Olympic sprint golds.

Shelly-Ann Fraser-Pryce was unable to become the first female athlete to win three consecutive Olympic Golds in the same event, as she could only get bronze in the Women's 100m. However the title would remain in Jamaica as World 200m silver medallist would take the title in her first Olympics. It would be first stage of an Olympic sprint double as she also won Gold in the Women's 200m becoming the first woman to do the double since Florence Griffith Joyner in 1988. In the Men's 110m Hurdles, World Indoor Champion Omar McLeod won Jamaica's first ever Olympic gold in the event with 13.05. Jamaica also won three relay silvers in the games in: the Men's 4 × 400 m (Peter Matthews, Nathon Allen, Fitzroy Dunkley, Javon Francis and Rusheen McDonald*); Women's 4 × 100 m (Christania Williams, Thompson, Veronica Campbell-Brown, Fraser-Pryce, Simone Facey* and Sashalee Forbes*); and the Women's 4 × 400 m (Stephenie Ann McPherson, Anneisha McLaughlin-Whilby, Shericka Jackson, Novlene Williams-Mills, Christine Day* and Chrisann Gordon*). In the Women's 400m Jackson won bronze. Jamaica's 6 golds, 3 silvers and 2 bronzes put them third on the athletics medal table and equalled the record medal tally from eight years previously. They placed 16th on the overall Olympic medal table.

Olympic champion Omar McLeod won Jamaica's only gold of the 2017 World Championships in London, UK. In the Men's 100m Usain Bolt won bronze, his last ever championship medal and his first ever bronze. Bolt retired as the most successful athlete in the history of the World Championships and remains the most successful male athlete with 11 golds, 2 silvers and 1 bronze. Jamaica also won bronzes in the Women's 400m Hurdles (Ristananna Tracey) and the Women's 4 × 100 m (Jura Levy, Natasha Morrison, Simone Facey, Sashalee Forbes and Christania Williams*). Ultimately it was a disappointing championships following the highs of the previous few years.

At the 2018 World Indoor Championships in Birmingham, Jamaica won two field silvers – Danniel Thomas-Dodd with a Jamaican Record 19.22m in the Women's Shot Put and Kimberly Williams in the Women's Triple Jump.

The 2018 Commonwealth Games in Gold Coast, Australia were held in April which is early in the traditional athletics season. In line with recent Commonwealth Games, Jamaica performed strongly. Jamaica got 1-2s in the Men's 110m Hurdles with Ronald Levy taking the title ahead of Hansle Parchment, the Women's Triple Jump with Kimberly Williams pipping Shanieka Ricketts by 12 cm and in the Men's Discus with Fedrick Dacres setting a Games Record 68.20m to beat Traves Smikle. Dacres and Smikle were Jamaica's first Discus medallists since their first Commonwealth athletics medallist Bernard Leopold Prendergast in 1934. In the Women's Shot Put Danniel Thomas-Dodd set a Jamaican Record with 19.36m to win Gold ahead of former Olympic and World Champion Valerie Adams. Aisha Praught-Leer won gold in the Women's 3000m steeplechase, Jamaica's first ever medal in the event. Jamaica also won Commonwealth titles in the Women's 400m Hurdles (Janieve Russell) and the Women's 4 × 400 m (Christine Day, Anastasia Le-Roy, Janieve Russell and Stephenie Ann McPherson) . In the Women's 100m, 100m hurdles and 400m Jamaica picked up silver (Christania Williams, Danielle Williams, Anastasia Le-Roy) and bronze (Gayon Evans, Yanique Thompson, McPherson). In addition to the aforementioned 1-2s Jamaica also won silvers in the Women's 200m (Shericka Jackson), Women's 4 × 100 m (Christania Williams, Natasha Morrison, Gayon Evans, Elaine Thompson). Jamaica won bronzes in: the Women's 800m (Natoya Goule); the Men's T47 100m (Tevaughn Thomas); Men's 4 × 400 m relay (Jermaine Gayle, Demish Gaye, Jamari Rose, Javon Francis and Peter Matthews*); Men's 4 × 100 m relay (Everton Clarke, Oshane Bailey, Warren Weir, Yohan Blake and Nigel Ellis*); Men's 400m hurdles (Jaheel Hyde); and Men's 400m (Francis). Jamaica were again 2nd on the athletics medal table for a second consecutive Games.

At the 2019 World Championships in Doha, Qatar for the first time since 2007 Jamaica won no male track golds. In the Men's Long Jump Tajay Gayle won a shock gold with a World Lead and Jamaican Record 8.69m, winning Jamaica's first ever title in the event. In the Women's 100m Shelly-Ann Fraser-Pryce returned from maternity leave to win her 4th gold in the Women's 100m an incredible 10 years after her first World title in Berlin, Fraser-Pryce would go on to win her 9th World Championship gold in the Women's 4 × 100 m alongside Natalliah Whyte, Jonielle Smith, Shericka Jackson and Natasha Morrison*. Fedrick Dacres won silver in the Men's Discus, this was Jamaica's first ever global medal in the event. In the Woman's Shot Put Danniel Thomas-Dodd became the first Jamaican woman to win a world medal in the event as she took silver. Jamaica also won silvers in the Men's 4 × 400 m (Akeem Bloomfield, Nathon Allen, Terry Thomas, Demish Gayle and Javon Francis*), the Women's Triple Jump (Shanieka Ricketts) and the inaugural mixed 4 × 400 m relay (Allen, Roneisha McGregor, Tiffany James, Javon Francis and Janieve Russell*). Jamaica won bronzes in the Women's 4 × 400 m (Anastasia Le-Roy, James, Stephenie Ann McPherson, Jackson and McGregor); Women's 400m Hurdles (Rushell Clayton), Women's 100m Hurdles (Danielle Williams) and Women's 400m (Jackson). Jamaica finished 3rd on the medal table behind USA and Kenya.

== Youth athletic development in Jamaica ==
Most Jamaican schools have an athletics program in the curriculum, so Jamaican children are into athletics at a young age. Budding young athletes have to impress at primary school level as this can get them recognised by good athletics schools like St. Jago High, Kingston College and Vere Technical High. The most important athletics event in Jamaica is the VMBS Boys and Girls Athletics Championships (colloquially known simply as 'Champs') which began in 1910 at Sabina Park and were won by Wolmer's High School. These championships are a chance for athletes under 19 to show off their talents to national and overseas coaches. The championships are incredibly popular in Jamaica and the athletes are normally competing to crowds of 20–25,000 people, which is good preparation for major championships and some of the championship records are world class. The championships are the climax of a series of athletics meetings for under-19s in Jamaica, and this is similar to the grand prix series whose climax is normally a major championships in Senior athletics. Dominant athletes are normally picked for the Penn Relays, a competition where the best Jamaican schools and universities compete against American counterparts. Herb McKenley entered the first Jamaican high school team into the Penn Relays in 1964; since then, Jamaicans have won more than half the events.

=== Top 5 Jamaican 100 m athletes — women ===
Updated 07 October 2025

Rank	Time	Athlete	Nation	Date	Location
1.	10.54	Elaine Thompson	Jamaica	21 August 2021	Eugene, Oregon
2.	10.60	Shelly-Ann Fraser-Pryce	Jamaica	26 August 2021	Lausanne, Switzerland
3.	10.65	Shericka Jackson	Jamaica	7 July 2023	Kingston, Jamaica
4.	10.74	Merlene Ottey	Jamaica	7 September 1996	Milan, Italy
5.	10.75	Kerron Stewart	Jamaica	10 July 2009	Rome, Italy

=== Top 5 Jamaican 100 m athletes — men ===
Updated 07 October 2025

Rank	Time	Athlete	Nation	Date	Location
1	9.58	Usain Bolt	Jamaica	16 August 2009	Berlin, Germany
2	9.69	Yohan Blake	Jamaica	23 August 2012	Lausanne, Switzerland
3	9.72	Asafa Powell	Jamaica	2 September 2008	Lausanne, Switzerland
4	9.75	Kishane Thompson	Jamaica	27 June 2025	Kingston, Jamaica
5	9.77	Oblique Seville	Jamaica	14 September 2025	Tokyo, Japan

== Coaching in Jamaica ==
In recent years, many Jamaican athletes have decided to stay in Jamaica to train. Stephen Francis a Jamaican coach created the MVP ("Maximising Velocity and Power") club in 2001 based in University of Technology (UTech), Kingston. He created this club because he felt Jamaican athletes were becoming "Americans" not interested in coming back to Jamaica.

In 2001 Brigitte Foster-Hylton came from America and joined this club. Foster was an unknown in the first year, so no one was interested in sponsoring her. Francis sold his car to keep funding the club. In late 2001 Asafa Powell an athlete with a personal best of 10.70 joined the club. In the years to come Asafa Powell smashed the 100 m world record twice. Bridgette set a new national record in the 100 m hurdles and is now Commonwealth champion.

Sherone Simpson had not won a race and since joining the club she is now one of the world's top sprinters and an Olympic silver medallist. Francis also coaches 100 m Olympic Champion Shelly-Ann Fraser, Olympic 400 m silver medallist Shericka Williams and 400 m hurdles Olympic Gold medalist Melaine Walker. Francis has also influenced the careers of Ainsley Waugh and Germaine Mason. Jamaica's recent successes are thanks to home-based coaches like Stephen Francis.

A few years ago, the Jamaican Amateur Athletic Association (JAAA) built the High Performance Training Centre in UTech, to try to get athletes to stay in Jamaica. Since then there are several high-profile athletes from all over the Caribbean training there, including triple Olympic champion Usain Bolt, under the tutelage of Jamaican Sprint Guru Glen Mills. Mills has recently set up a new club in Jamaica called the Racers Track Club, which has athletes such as Usain Bolt and Daniel Bailey from Antigua.

On 13 October 2013, Usain Bolt's coach, Glen Mills, defended Usain Bolt and other Jamaican sprinters from an investigation by the World Anti Doping Agency and allegations that the Jamaican anti-doping program was insufficient, stating that the sprinters were being unfairly targeted due to their dominance in the sport. Mills stated that the agency was "targeting Jamaican sprinters due to their success."

== Jamaican-born athletes who have competed for other countries ==
Many Jamaican-born athletes have chosen to compete for other nations.

- Linford Christie was born in Saint Andrew, Jamaica he immigrated to Britain at the age of seven and competed for them. He won three European Championship golds, three Commonwealth golds, one World gold and an Olympic gold medal in the 100m.
- Tessa Sanderson was born in Saint Catherine, Jamaica. She immigrated to Britain, for whom she won two Commonwealth golds and an Olympic Gold.
- Former world record holder Donovan Bailey was born in Manchester, Jamaica but immigrated to Canada at the age of 13. He went on to win 3 World Championship golds and 2 Olympic Golds for Canada.
- Merlene Ottey competed for Jamaica up to the 2000 Olympic Games, when she was controversially chosen over Peta-Gay Dowdie who finished before her in the national trials. The next year, Merlene Ottey went on to compete for Slovenia.
- Sanya Richards was born in Kingston, Jamaica. She moved to America at twelve years old. Despite being the daughter of a Jamaican football player, Sanya chose to compete for the United States. In 2005 she won a silver medal at the World Championships and in 2008 won Olympic bronze. However, in 2009 she finally fulfilled her potential by becoming world champion in the 400m.
- Canadian Ben Johnson was born in Falmouth, Jamaica and immigrated to Canada at the age of 15. He has won two Olympic bronzes.
- Angella Taylor was born in Jamaica but competed for Canada. She won two Commonwealth golds. It was later discovered that she was part of a doping regime with Ben Johnson.
- Sprinter Charmaine Crooks competed at four consecutive Olympics for Canada, winning a silver medal in the 4 × 400 m relay, but was actually born in Mandeville, Jamaica.
- High jumper Germaine Mason originally competed for Jamaica as he was born in Kingston, but switched to Great Britain as his father was born there. He won an Olympic silver medal in 2008.
- Derrick Atkins won 100 m silver at the 2007 World Championships. He is the cousin of former world record holder Asafa Powell, and was born in Kingston, Jamaica.
- Jak Ali Harvey, formerly Jacques Montgomery Harvey (born 4 May 1989 in Hanover Parish, Jamaica) is a former Jamaican sprinter. He now competes for Turkey.
- Emre Zafer Barnes, (born Winston Barnes on 7 November 1988) is a Jamaica-born Turkish sprinter.
- Andrew Fisher (born 15 December 1991) is a Bahraini sprinter, who represented Jamaica until 2015.
- Kemarley Brown (born 20 July 1992) is a Bahraini track and field sprinter competed for Jamaica until 2015.
- Julian Walsh (ウォルシュ・ジュリアン・ジャミイ Uorusyu Jurian Jamii, born 18 September 1996 in Kingston, Jamaica) is a Jamaican-born Japanese track and field athlete competing in the sprints. He is the son of reggae drummer Emanuel Walsh
- Alex Wilson (born 19 September 1990 in Kingston, Jamaica) is a Swiss sprinter of Jamaican origin. He finished third at the 2018 European Championships in the 200 metres event.
- Gavin Smellie (born 26 June 1986) is a Jamaican-born Canadian sprinter.
- O'Jay Ferguson (born 17 October 1993) is a Jamaican born Bahamian sprinter . He won a silver medal in the 4 × 400 m Relay at the 2018 Commonwealth Games
- Jackie Edwards (born 14 April 1971 in Falmouth, Trelawny Parish) is a Bahamian long jumper.
- Cydonie Mothersille (born 19 March 1978) is a female former track and field sprinter from the Cayman Islands. She was born in Jamaica.
- Jerome Blake is a Canadian Sprinter that won a bronze medal in the 4 × 100 m at the 2020 Olympic Games. He was born in Buff Bay, Jamaica

== Athletes with Jamaican parentage ==
- There are also some star athletes with Jamaican parentage. Kelly Holmes’ father is Jamaican. Kelly won two Olympic Golds in 2004 and has won two Commonwealth Golds for Great Britain.
- Denise Lewis’ mother was born in Hanover, Jamaica. Denise won Olympic gold in 2000. She also won a European Championship gold and two Commonwealth golds for Great Britain.
- Both of hurdler Colin Jackson's parents were born in Jamaica, but he competed for Great Britain. Colin won two World Championship golds and an Olympic Silver.
- American sprinter Inger Miller is the daughter of Jamaican Olympic legend Lennox Miller. Inger won two World Championship golds.
- Italian long jumper Fiona May has Jamaican parentage. Fiona won two World Championship golds.
- Great Britain's 2009 world heptathlon champion Jessica Ennis's father was born in St Catherine, Jamaica and moved to Britain when he was young.
- The mother of former Trinidad sprinter Ato Boldon is Montego Bay, Jamaica
- The parents of high jumper Dalton Grant, European and Commonwealth gold medallist and triple Olympian, were both born in Jamaica, in Kingston and St. Thomas respectively.
- Japanese sprinter Asuka Cambridge, who competed in the semi-finals for the 100 meter race in the Rio de Janeiro Olympics, was born in Jamaica to a Jamaican father and Japanese mother.
- Kemar Hyman (born 11 October 1989) is a Caymanian sprinter of Jamaican descent.
- Zharnel Hughes (born 13 July 1995) is a British sprinter born in Anguilla who specialises in the 100 metres and 200 metres. Hughes Has a Jamaican Mother.
- Dina Asher-Smith Is a British sprint olympic medalist and 200m World Champion. Both of her Parents were born in Jamaica.
- Asha Philip Is a British sprint olympic medalist that has a Jamaican mother.
- Dalton Grant Former 3xOlympian High jumper. Was a European & Commonwealth Champion. His parents was from Kingston and St Thomas.
- Natasha Hastings American Sprinter and olympic gold Medalist has a Jamaican father
- Gabrielle Thomas American Sprinter who won a bronze medal in the 200m at the 2020 Olympics has a Jamaican father.
- Olusoji Fasuba (born 9 July 1984) is a Nigerian sprinter who specializes in the 100 metres. He was the African record holder in the event with 9.85 seconds until Akani Simbine broke it in July 2021 with 9.84 seconds. He has Jamaican mother who is a cousin to Don Quarrie
- Alonso Edward (born 8 December 1989), is a Panamanian sprinter who specialises in the 100 and 200 metres. He holds the South American record in the 200m. He has a Jamaican mother.
- Nethaneel Mitchell-Blake (born 2 April 1994) is a British sprinter who specialises in the 200 metres. Jamaican Parentage and moved to Jamaica at age 13.
- Bianca Williams (born 18 December 1993) is a British athlete of Jamaican descent.
- Leon Reid (born 26 July 1994) is a male track and field British born sprinter who competes for Ireland. Has English-Jamaican father.
- Jazmin Sawyers is British Long Jumper who has competed at the 2020 Olympics. Sawyers has a Jamaican father.
- Briana Williams is an American born Jamaican Sprinter who won an Olympic gold medal for Jamaica at the 2020 Olympic Games.

== See also ==
- Jamaica at the Olympics
- Jamaica at the 2006 Commonwealth Games
