= Jason Young (sprinter) =

Jamaican sprinter

Personal information
- Nationality: Jamaica
- Born: 21 March 1991 (age 35) Jamaica

Sport
- Sport: Athletics
- Event(s): 100 metres, 200 metres
- College team: UWI Mona
- Club: Racers Track Club
- Coached by: Glen Mills

Achievements and titles
- Personal best(s): 100 metres: 10.06 (+1.0 m/s) (Luzern 2012); 200 metres: 19.86 (+1.5 m/s) (Luzern 2012)
Medal record
CAC Championships
Gold medal – first place	2011 Mayagüez	4×100 metres relay
Bronze medal – third place	2011 Mayagüez	200 metres
Summer Universiade
Silver medal – second place	2011 Shenzhen	200 m

Jason Young (born 21 March 1991) is a Jamaican sprinter, competing in the 100 metres and 200 metres.

Jason is a student at University of the West Indies, Mona and won a joint silver medal in the 200 m at the 2011 Summer Universiade.

Young attracted attention in July 2012 when he set a massive new personal best of 19.86 s in the 200 metres at the Spitzen Leichtathletik meeting in Lucerne, beating Warren Weir. Earlier in the evening he had set a new personal best of 10.06 s in the 100 metres.
