= Spitzen Leichtathletik Luzern =

Annual track and field meet in Lucerne, Switzerland

- Date: June–July
- Location: Lucerne, Switzerland
- Event type: Track and field
- Established: 1987
- Website: spitzenleichtathletik.ch/en/Homepage.html

The Spitzen Leichtathletik Luzern (English: Top Athletics Lucerne) is an annual track and field meet that takes place in Lucerne, Switzerland. First held in 1987, the meeting usually takes place in July at Stadion Allmend.

== Meeting records ==
=== Men ===
Men's meeting records of the Spitzen Leichtathletik Luzern
Event	Record	Athlete	Nationality	Date	Ref.
100 m	9.85 (+1.6 m/s)	Yohan Blake	Jamaica	17 July 2012	
200 m	19.86 (+1.5 m/s)	Jason Young	Jamaica	17 July 2012	
400 m	44.45	Butch Reynolds	United States	14 July 1997	
800 m	1:44.35 (Note: by World Athletics source; 1:44.30 by event sources, pobably his time of 1:44.30 on August 16, 2002 at Weltklasse Zürich was erroneously attributed to the Lucerne event)	André Bucher	Switzerland	4 July 2000	
1500 m	3:34.60	José Carlos Pinto	Portugal	15 July 2025	
3000 m	7:37.50	Dominic Lokinyomo Lobalu	South Sudan	16 July 2024	
5000 m	12:55.60	Jacob Kiplimo	Uganda	29 June 2021	
10,000 m	29:29.85	Markus Graf	Switzerland	1992	
110 m hurdles	13.02 (+1.5 m/s)	Mark Crear	United States	10 July 1995	
400 m hurdles	47.68	Derrick Adkins	United States	10 July 1995	
3000 m steeplechase	8:13.52	Wilson Boit Kipketer	Kenya	2002	
High jump	2.30 m	Yaroslav Rybakov	Russia	4 July 2004	
Pole vault	5.75 m	Denis Petushinsky	Russia	1994	
Long jump	8.28 m (−0.7 m/s)	Dwight Phillips	United States	4 July 2004	
Triple jump	17.41 m (+0.3 m/s)	Aarik Wilson	United States	2007	
Shot put	22.12 m	Werner Günthör	Switzerland	15 July 1987	
Discus throw	67.42 m	Gerd Kanter	Estonia	14 July 2009 (Note: by event source; 15 July 2009 by World Athletics source)	
Hammer throw	78.66 m	Aleksey Sokirskiy	Ukraine	17 July 2012	
Javelin throw	94.44 m	Johannes Vetter	Germany	11 July 2017	
4 × 100 m relay	38.39	Kevin Kranz; Marvin Schulte; Heiko Gussmann; Lucas Ansah-Peprah	Germany	16 July 2026	
4 × 400 m relay	3:06.19		Great Britain	2016	

=== Women ===
Women's meeting records of the Spitzen Leichtathletik Luzern
Event	Record	Athlete	Nationality	Date	Ref.
100 m	10.82 (+0.3 m/s)	Shelly-Ann Fraser-Pryce	Jamaica	20 July 2023	
200 m	22.05 (+0.1 m/s)	Brittany Brown	United States	20 July 2023	
400 m	50.35	Cathy Freeman	Australia	8 July 1998	
800 m	1:58.66	Suzy Hamilton	United States	8 July 1998	
1500 m	4:04.82	Sarah Jamieson	Australia	4 July 2004	
3000 m	8:45.93	Mercy Cherono	Kenya	17 July 2012	
5000 m	15:15.14	Stacy Ndiwa	Kenya	2014	
100 m hurdles	12.41 (+0.3 m/s)	Jasmine Camacho-Quinn	Puerto Rico	16 July 2024	
400 m hurdles	53.63	Janieve Russel	Jamaica	9 July 2018	
3000 m steeplechase	9:32.61	Caroline Tuigong	Kenya	9 July 2018	
High jump	1.98 m	Stefka Kostadinova	Bulgaria	16 July 1993	
Pole vault	4.81 m	Yarisley Silva	Cuba	17 July 2013	
Long jump	6.89 m (+1.0 m/s)	Erica Johansson	Sweden	6 July 1999	
Triple jump	14.76 m (+0.9 m/s)	Galina Chistyakova	Russia	10 July 1995	
Shot put	21.11 m	Valerie Adams	New Zealand	17 July 2012	
Discus throw	64.09 m	Yarelis Barrios	Cuba	8 August 2010	
Hammer throw	69.38 m	Samantha Borutta	Germany	29 June 2021	
Javelin throw	67.70 m	Kelsey-Lee Barber	Australia	9 July 2019	
4 × 100 m relay	43.64	Chloé Rabac; Soraya Becerra; Ajla Del Ponte; Natacha Kouni	Switzerland	16 July 2026	
4 × 400 m relay	3:34.73	Bergmann, Strand, Fernstroem, Skoglund	Sweden	1986	

== See also ==
- Athletissima
- Weltklasse Zürich
