= Warren Weir =

Jamaican sprinter

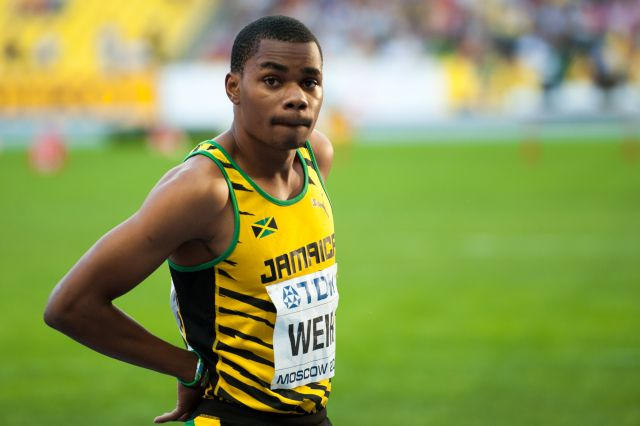
- Warren Weir during the 2013 World Championships in Moscow

Personal information
- Born: 31 October 1989 (age 37)^{[nb]} Bunkers Hill, Jamaica
- Height: 5 ft 11 in (180 cm)
- Weight: 160 lb (73 kg)

Sport
- Sport: Athletics
- Event: 200 metres
- College team: Calabar High School
- Club: Racers Track Club
- Coached by: Glen Mills

Achievements and titles
- Personal bests: 100m 10.02 (+1.5 m/s) (Kingston, Jamaica 2013); 200 m 19.79 (+0.9 m/s) (Kingston, Jamaica 2013)
Medal record
Olympic Games
Bronze medal – third place	2012 London	200 m
World Championships
Gold medal – first place	2013 Moscow	4x100 m relay
Silver medal – second place	2013 Moscow	200 m
Commonwealth Games
Silver medal – second place	2014 Glasgow	200 m
Bronze medal – third place	2018 Gold Coast	4x100 m relay
Diamond League
First place	2013	200 m

Warren Weir (born 31 October 1989) is a retired Jamaican sprinter who specialized in the 200 metres. He was the bronze medallist in the event at the 2012 London Olympics, helping Jamaica sweep the event. In 2013, at the Moscow World Championships, Warren Weir won the silver medal equalling his personal best. He finished behind Usain Bolt, who set a world leading time. His personal best is 19.79 seconds, set at the National Stadium in his home country Jamaica. He has since equalled his personal best in Moscow, in the World Championship final. He trained with the Glen Mills-coached Racers Track Club, alongside Usain Bolt and Yohan Blake.

== Career ==
At the start of his career, Weir competed in short sprints and the 110 metres hurdles. Born in Trelawny Parish, he ran the 100 m and 200 m for Calabar High School at the Jamaican High School Championships. At the 2007 Jamaican junior championships, he set a hurdles best of 13.65 seconds for second place and a 100 m dash best of 10.69 seconds. He was a hurdles finalist at the 2007 Pan American Junior Athletics Championships and a silver medallist at the 2008 CARIFTA Games, where he also shared the 4×100 metres relay gold medal. In his first appearance on the global stage, Weir reached the semi-finals at the 2008 World Junior Championships in Athletics. He competed sparingly in his first years as a senior, although he did run personal bests in the 100 m (10.50) and the 400 metres hurdles (53.28) in 2009.

Weir began to emerge as a 200 m specialist in 2011 after joining the Racers Track Club under coach Glen Mills. He and Mills noticed that the hurdles were leaving him with knee pain and both decided that Weir should focus on sprinting instead. He dipped under 21 second barrier for the first time and placed sixth at the Jamaican Championships. He was invited to European meetings for the first time and performed well at his first Diamond League meeting, taking second place to Walter Dix with a personal best of 20.43 seconds into a strong headwind. He began 2012 by bringing his 200 m best down to 20.21, then 20.13 seconds. A time of 20.08 seconds brought him third place at the Adidas Grand Prix in New York in June.

At the Jamaican Olympic Trials in 2012, Weir broke twenty seconds with a personal best of 19.99 seconds in the 200 m semi final and a third-place finish in the final, behind Yohan Blake and Usain Bolt, earned him a spot on the Jamaican team for the 2012 Summer Olympics. In the Olympic 200 m final, he was a surprise bronze medallist, securing a new personal best of 19.84 seconds in the process. His medal made it an all-Jamaican podium finish alongside fellow Racers Track Club athletes Bolt and Blake – the first time Jamaican men had achieved such a medal sweep at the Olympics.

Weir started out his 2013 season with a victory of 20.11 seconds in the Adidas Grand Prix in New York City. In June, he registered a 10.02 100m run, a massive personal best from his previous record of 10.51 seconds in 2008. Later in the 2013 Jamaican National Championships, Weir cruised to the finish line in the 200m final in 19.79 seconds, tying Bolt's world leading mark at that point. Having won the first two of his diamond league 200m races (in the Golden Grand Prix and the Adidas Grand Prix), Weir finished second to Bolt at the Meeting Areva, where Bolt set a world lead and meeting record of 19.73. Despite the clear loss to Bolt in Paris, Weir looked to be the closest to a challenger for Bolt at the World Championships that year. At the London Anniversary Games, Weir clocked an impressive 19.89 and followed this up with a meeting record in the relay, clocking 37.75.

During the 2013 World Championships, Weir advanced through the heats easily and made it to the final. In the final, Bolt won the race in a world leading time of 19.66 to become the first man to win the 200m at the World Championships three times. Weir won a clear silver at 19.79, equalling his best, while Curtis Mitchell the bronze in 20.04. Weir would later collect a gold in the 4 × 100 m, after running in the heats. Weir finished his season off by winning the 200m at the Memorial Van Damme in Brussels and hence won the Diamond League.

In 2014, Weir competed in the Commonwealth Games, running the 200m. After winning his heats, Weir won the silver medal in the final.

He is known for saying "No English, straight Patois", sparking calls on social networks for T-shirts to be printed with the phrase.

In August 2017, Weir announced his retirement from competition via his Instagram account, after not advancing from the heats in the 200 m at the 2017 World Championships in London.

In a change of sport, Weir was a member of the Jamaica rugby sevens team that came third at the 2018 Central American and Caribbean Games.

== Statistics ==
=== Personal bests ===
- 100 metres: 10.02 sec (2013)
- 200 metres: 19.79 sec (2013)
- 400 metres: 46.10 sec (2013)
- 110 metres hurdles (junior): 13.65 sec (2007)
- 400 metres hurdles: 53.28 sec (2009)

=== International competition record ===
Year	Competition	Venue	Position	Event	Notes
2007	Pan American Junior Championships	São Paulo, Brazil	6th (h)	110 m hurdles (99.0 cm)	14.40 (wind: +0.1 m/s)
2008	CARIFTA Games (under-20)	Basseterre, Saint Kitts and Nevis	2nd	110 m hurdles (99.0 cm)	14.13 (wind: -0.5 m/s)
2008	CARIFTA Games (under-20)	Basseterre, Saint Kitts and Nevis	1st	4 × 100 m relay	39.80
2008	World Junior Championships	Bydgoszcz, Poland	24th (sf)	110m hurdles (99.0 cm)	15.54 (wind: -0.9 m/s)
2012	Olympic Games	London, United Kingdom	3rd	200 m	19.84 (wind: +0.4 m/s)
2013	World Championships	Moscow, Russia	2nd	200 m	19.79
2014	Commonwealth Games	Glasgow, United Kingdom	2nd	200 m	20.26
2015	World Championships	Beijing, China	18th (sf)	200 m	20.43
2017	World Championships	London, United Kingdom	27th (h)	200 m	20.60
2018	Commonwealth Games	Gold Coast, Australia	7th	200 m	20.71
