= Athletics at the 2011 Summer Universiade – Men's 200 metres =

The men's 200 metres event at the 2011 Summer Universiade was held on 18–19 August.

== Medalists ==
Gold	Silver	Bronze
Rasheed Dwyer; Jamaica	Thuso Mpuang; South Africa; Jason Young; Jamaica	

== Results ==
=== Heats ===
Qualification: First 3 in each heat (Q) and the next 7 fastest (q) qualified for the quarterfinals.

Wind:
Heat 1: -1.0 m/s, Heat 2: -0.5 m/s, Heat 3: -1.0 m/s, Heat 4: -0.1 m/s, Heat 5: -0.4 m/s, Heat 6: +0.1 m/s
Heat 7: -0.1 m/s, Heat 8: -0.3 m/s, Heat 9: +1.2 m/s, Heat 10: +1.1 m/s, Heat 11: +0.4 m/s

Rank	Heat	Name	Nationality	Time	Notes
1	9	Oluwasegun Makinde	Canada	20.90	Q, PB
2	11	Obinna Metu	Nigeria	20.99	Q, SB
3	3	Reza Ghasemi	Iran	21.08	Q, NR
4	9	Rasheed Dwyer	Jamaica	21.09	Q
5	3	Jason Young	Jamaica	21.12	Q
6	11	Aleksandr Khyutte	Russia	21.17	Q
7	2	Jesse Uri Khob	Namibia	21.19	Q, PB
7	7	Ratu Banuve Tabakaucoro	Fiji	21.19	Q, PB
9	6	Egidijus Dilys	Lithuania	21.20	Q, PB
10	1	Obakeng Ngwigwa	Botswana	21.21	Q
11	6	Shōta Iizuka	Japan	21.25	Q
12	8	Anton Yurataev	Russia	21.31	Q
13	4	James Alaka	Great Britain	21.32	Q
14	9	Wilfried Koffi Hua	Ivory Coast	21.33	Q
15	2	Rapula Sefanyetso	South Africa	21.40	Q
16	4	Ho Manloklawrence	Hong Kong	21.41	Q, SB
17	7	Justin Murdock	United States	21.42	Q
18	1	Aivaras Pranckevičius	Lithuania	21.42	Q
19	2	Liemarvin Bonevacia	Netherlands Antilles	21.45	Q, PB
20	8	Ryota Yamagata	Japan	21.47	Q
21	6	Aliaksandr Linnik	Belarus	21.48	Q
22	9	Leung Kiho	Hong Kong	21.50	q
23	8	Kael Becerra	Chile	21.57	Q
23	4	Lee Cheng Wei	Singapore	21.57	Q, PB
23	11	Fernando Lumain	Indonesia	21.57	Q
26	10	Kao Haichao	China	21.58	Q
27	11	Somchai Kittisuntornrak	Thailand	21.68	q, SB
28	5	Thuso Mpuang	South Africa	21.69	Q
29	1	Nicklas Hyde	Denmark	21.70	Q
29	4	Mohammad Noor Imran A Hadi	Malaysia	21.70	q
31	2	Franklin Nazareno	Ecuador	21.75	q
32	4	Marvin Kamuingona	Namibia	21.79	q
32	10	Adnan Tammar	Morocco	21.79	Q
34	8	Krasimir Braykov	Bulgaria	21.80	q
35	7	Marek Niit	Estonia	21.81	Q
36	11	Mike Kalisz	Denmark	21.89	q
37	5	Loato Kelediyakgotla	Botswana	21.94	Q
38	10	Yeo Fu Ee Gary	Singapore	21.98	Q
39	7	Anthos Christofides	Cyprus	21.99	
40	6	Jānis Baltušs	Latvia	22.06	
41	10	Lee Jaeha	South Korea	22.07	
42	6	Amadou Ndiaye	Senegal	22.14	
42	9	Gary Robinson	Costa Rica	22.14	
42	9	Jurgen Themen	Suriname	22.14	
45	11	Kim Minkyun	South Korea	22.19	
46	1	Manqoba Benni Nyoni	Swaziland	22.25	
47	8	Bilal Alsalfa	United Arab Emirates	22.30	
48	6	Agampodi de Silva	Sri Lanka	22.35	
49	5	Jorge Jímenez	Costa Rica	22.41	Q
50	5	Gert Glukmann	Estonia	22.48	
51	10	Mohamad Tamim	Lebanon	22.50	
52	7	Ramzi Naim	Lebanon	22.55	
53	3	Nor Mohd Ikhwan	Malaysia	22.55	Q
54	5	Pius Ocilaje	Uganda	22.59	
54	10	Farrel Octaviandi	Indonesia	22.59	
56	2	Elorm Amenakpor	Ghana	22.67	
57	11	Paulus Mathijsen	Netherlands Antilles	23.00	
58	4	Hammam Hassan Al Farsi	Oman	23.01	
59	4	Richard Ongom	Uganda	23.24	
60	6	Mussa Abdu Howsawi	Saudi Arabia	23.33	
61	1	Ismail Alkindi	Oman	23.48	
62	3	Anthony Metto	Kenya	23.55	
63	3	Lei Honweng	Macau	23.95	
64	9	Wong Chongsam	Macau	24.07	
65	2	Tony Kazimoto	Tanzania	24.26	
66	1	Md Abdul Momin Mamun	Bangladesh	24.54	
67	2	Jason McCaffrey	Federated States of Micronesia	24.60	
68	8	Ralf Tafaj	Albania	27.96	
69	4	Petar Kremenski	Bulgaria	53.00	
	1	Đặng Văn Thành	Vietnam	DNS	
	3	Mounir Mahadi	Chad	DNS	
	3	Denvil Ruan	Anguilla	DNS	
	5	Akwasi Frimpong	Netherlands	DNS	
	5	Gregor Kokalovič	Slovenia	DNS	
	6	Itai Vambe	Zimbabwe	DNS	
	7	Diego Cavalvanti	Brazil	DNS	
	7	Bob Niamali Madrakile	Democratic Republic of the Congo	DNS	
	7	Dontae Richards-Kwok	Canada	DNS	
	8	James Anyona Getengah	Kenya	DNS	
	8	Gérard Kobéané	Burkina Faso	DNS	
	10	Enoch Sekum	Ghana	DNS	

=== Quarterfinals ===
Qualification: First 3 in each heat (Q) and the next 1 fastest (q) qualified for the semifinals.

Wind:
Heat 1: 0.0 m/s, Heat 2: -1.0 m/s, Heat 3: 0.0 m/s, Heat 4: +0.2 m/s, Heat 5: -0.3 m/s

Rank	Heat	Name	Nationality	Time	Notes
1	2	Oluwasegun Makinde	Canada	20.72	Q, PB
2	5	Jason Young	Jamaica	20.86	Q
3	1	Aleksandr Khyutte	Russia	20.89	Q, PB
4	2	Thuso Mpuang	South Africa	20.91	Q
4	5	Reza Ghasemi	Iran	20.91	Q, NR
6	1	Obakeng Ngwigwa	Botswana	20.94	Q
7	4	Rasheed Dwyer	Jamaica	21.00	Q
8	2	Marek Niit	Estonia	21.00	Q
9	4	Obinna Metu	Nigeria	21.07	Q
10	3	Shōta Iizuka	Japan	21.08	Q
11	3	Aliaksandr Linnik	Belarus	21.10	Q
12	5	Wilfried Koffi Hua	Ivory Coast	21.11	Q, PB
13	4	James Alaka	Great Britain	21.13	Q
14	2	Ryota Yamagata	Japan	21.17	q
15	2	Kao Haichao	China	21.19	
16	3	Egidijus Dilys	Lithuania	21.23	Q
17	1	Jesse Uri Khob	Namibia	21.25	Q
18	3	Ratu Banuve Tabakaucoro	Fiji	21.26	
19	3	Rapula Sefanyetso	South Africa	21.28	
20	5	Anton Yurataev	Russia	21.29	
21	1	Ho Manloklawrence	Hong Kong	21.32	SB
22	4	Justin Murdock	United States	21.41	
22	5	Aivaras Pranckevičius	Lithuania	21.41	
24	4	Krasimir Braykov	Bulgaria	21.55	
25	3	Mohammad Noor Imran A Hadi	Malaysia	21.59	
26	1	Liemarvin Bonevacia	Netherlands Antilles	21.60	
27	3	Leung Kiho	Hong Kong	21.62	
28	1	Kael Becerra	Chile	21.65	
28	5	Fernando Lumain	Indonesia	21.65	
30	4	Nicklas Hyde	Denmark	21.70	
31	3	Lee Cheng Wei	Singapore	21.78	
32	5	Nor Mohd Ikhwan	Malaysia	21.85	
33	2	Adnan Tammar	Morocco	21.89	
34	2	Yeo Fu Ee Gary	Singapore	21.91	
35	2	Mike Kalisz	Denmark	21.91	
36	1	Franklin Nazareno	Ecuador	21.94	
37	1	Somchai Kittisuntornrak	Thailand	22.08	
38	5	Marvin Kamuingona	Namibia	22.09	
39	4	Jorge Luis Jímenez	Costa Rica	22.53	
	4	Loato Kelediyakgotla	Botswana	DNF	

=== Semifinals ===
Qualification: First 4 of each semifinal qualified directly (Q) for the final.

Wind:
Heat 1: -0.1 m/s, Heat 2: 0.0 m/s

Rank	Heat	Name	Nationality	Time	Notes
1	1	Rasheed Dwyer	Jamaica	20.70	Q
2	1	Oluwasegun Makinde	Canada	20.74	Q
3	2	Jason Young	Jamaica	20.76	Q
4	1	James Alaka	Great Britain	20.81	Q
5	1	Wilfried Koffi Hua	Ivory Coast	20.82	Q, PB
6	2	Thuso Mpuang	South Africa	20.88	Q
7	2	Reza Ghasemi	Iran	20.92	Q
8	2	Marek Niit	Estonia	20.94	Q
9	1	Shōta Iizuka	Japan	21.02	
10	2	Aleksandr Khyutte	Russia	21.10	
11	2	Aliaksandr Linnik	Belarus	21.11	
12	1	Obakeng Ngwigwa	Botswana	21.14	
13	2	Ryota Yamagata	Japan	21.15	
14	2	Egidijus Dilys	Lithuania	21.30	
15	1	Obinna Metu	Nigeria	21.30	
16	1	Jesse Uri Khob	Namibia	21.39	

=== Final ===
Wind: -0.3 m/s

Rank	Lane	Name	Nationality	Time	Notes
1st place, gold medalist(s)	6	Rasheed Dwyer	Jamaica	20.20	PB
2nd place, silver medalist(s)	5	Thuso Mpuang	South Africa	20.59	
2nd place, silver medalist(s)	4	Jason Young	Jamaica	20.59	
4	7	James Alaka	Great Britain	20.67	
5	3	Oluwasegun Makinde	Canada	20.83	
6	8	Reza Ghasemi	Iran	20.88	NR
7	1	Wilfried Koffi Hua	Ivory Coast	21.02	
8	2	Marek Niit	Estonia	21.09	
