= Racers Track Club =

Sprint training group

Racers Track Club is a sprint training group located at 3 Port of Spain Drive, University of the West Indies, Mona, Kingston, Jamaica. It was established by Glen Mills with the stated aim of producing a greater number of world champions than any other track club. The club is known for training some of the world's best sprinters, world champions currently training with the group include Usain Bolt and Yohan Blake.

== Current athletes ==
Athletes currently training with Racers Track Club include:

=== Men ===
- (Antigua and Barbuda) Daniel Bailey
- (United Kingdom) Miguel Francis
- (Jamaica) Jason Young
- (United Kingdom) Zharnel Hughes
- (Jamaica) Jevaughn Minzie
- (Jamaica) Kimmari Roach
- (United Kingdom) Delano Williams

=== Women ===
- (Jamaica) Schillonie Calvert
- (Jamaica) Kerron Stewart
- (Jamaica) Rosemarie Whyte

== Current staff ==
- Glen Mills, Head Coach & Director
- Patrick Dawson, Technical Director
