= Julian Walsh =

Jamaican-born Japanese sprinter

Personal information
- Full name: Julian Jrummi Walsh
- Born: 18 September 1996 (age 29) Kingston, Jamaica
- Height: 1.75 m (5 ft 9 in)
- Weight: 75 kg (165 lb)

Sport
- Country: Japan
- Sport: Track and field
- Event: 400 metres
Medal record
Men's athletics
Representing Japan
Asian Championships
Gold medal – first place	2019 Doha	4 × 400 metres relay

Julian Jrummi Walsh (ウォルシュ・ジュリアン・ジャミイ Uorushu Jurian Jamii, born 18 September 1996 in Kingston, Jamaica) is a Jamaican-born Japanese track and field athlete competing in the sprints. He is the son of reggae drummer Emanuel Walsh (Pablo Moses, the Mighty Diamonds, Garnett Silk and John Holt), who married a Japanese woman and has lived in Japan for almost 20 years. Walsh moved to Japan as a toddler and grew up in Higashimurayama. He started running track in 10th grade, but his school had no facilities to practice on and no coach. He couldn't take track seriously until the following year. After two seasons, he led off the Japanese silver medal winning relay team at the 2014 World Junior Championships in Athletics. That same summer he moved into senior level competition, anchoring the Asian-Pacific 4x400 metres relay team at the 2014 IAAF Continental Cup. Two years later, he qualified for the 2016 Olympics in the 400 metres, by running a 45.35 at the Japanese Olympic Trials in Nagoya at age 19.
