= Kimmari Roach =

Jamaican sprinter

Kimmari Roach (born 21 September 1990) is a Jamaican track and field sprinter who specialises in the 100 metres. He has a personal best of 10.12 seconds and was a 60 metres finalist at the 2014 IAAF World Indoor Championships. Roach is a member of Racers Track Club and is coached by Glen Mills.

Born in Saint Andrew Parish, Jamaica, Roach competed at the Jamaican High School Champs as a teenager but did not reach the podium. He made his impact at national level in 2009, winning the Jamaican universities 100 m title and setting a personal best of 10.38 seconds for third at the Kingston Classic meet. He improved to 10.34 to win at the 2010 Penn Relays. At the Jamaican Athletics Championships he ran a new best of 10.13 seconds in the semi-final, then placed third in the 100 m final. He competed in Europe for the first time that year with a win at the Weltklasse in Biberach being his highlight. He was twice runner-up on the 2011 Brazilian Athletics Grand Prix circuit. Roach failed to improve upon his best or make the Jamaican 100 m final that year and the two years after.

A performance of 6.59 seconds in the 60 metres to take third at the 2014 Millrose Games gained him selection for the 2014 IAAF World Indoor Championships. In the semi-final he had a personal best run of 6.55 seconds, but was a little slower in the final, placing eighth in a close race.

== Personal bests ==
- 50 metres – 5.74 sec (2012)
- 60 metres – 6.55 sec (2014)
- 100 metres – 10.12 sec (2014)
