= Emanuel Walsh =

Reggae Singer and Drummer from Jamaica

Emanuel Walsh (born 1962 in St. Mary, Jamaica, West Indies) is a reggae singer and drummer from Jamaica. He worked with a number of artists and bands including Emanuel Walsh (Pablo Moses, the Mighty Diamonds, Garnett Silk and John Holt). Together with bass player Ian Knight, Walsh formed the band Black Blood. Walsh also performed at the Jamaican Song Festival, after which point he signed a five-year contract with Sony Records. He has appeared regularly on Nippon TV and his son is 2016 Rio Olympian Julian Walsh. Walsh has also been a regular performer at the Reggae Sunsplash festival.
