= Pablo Moses =

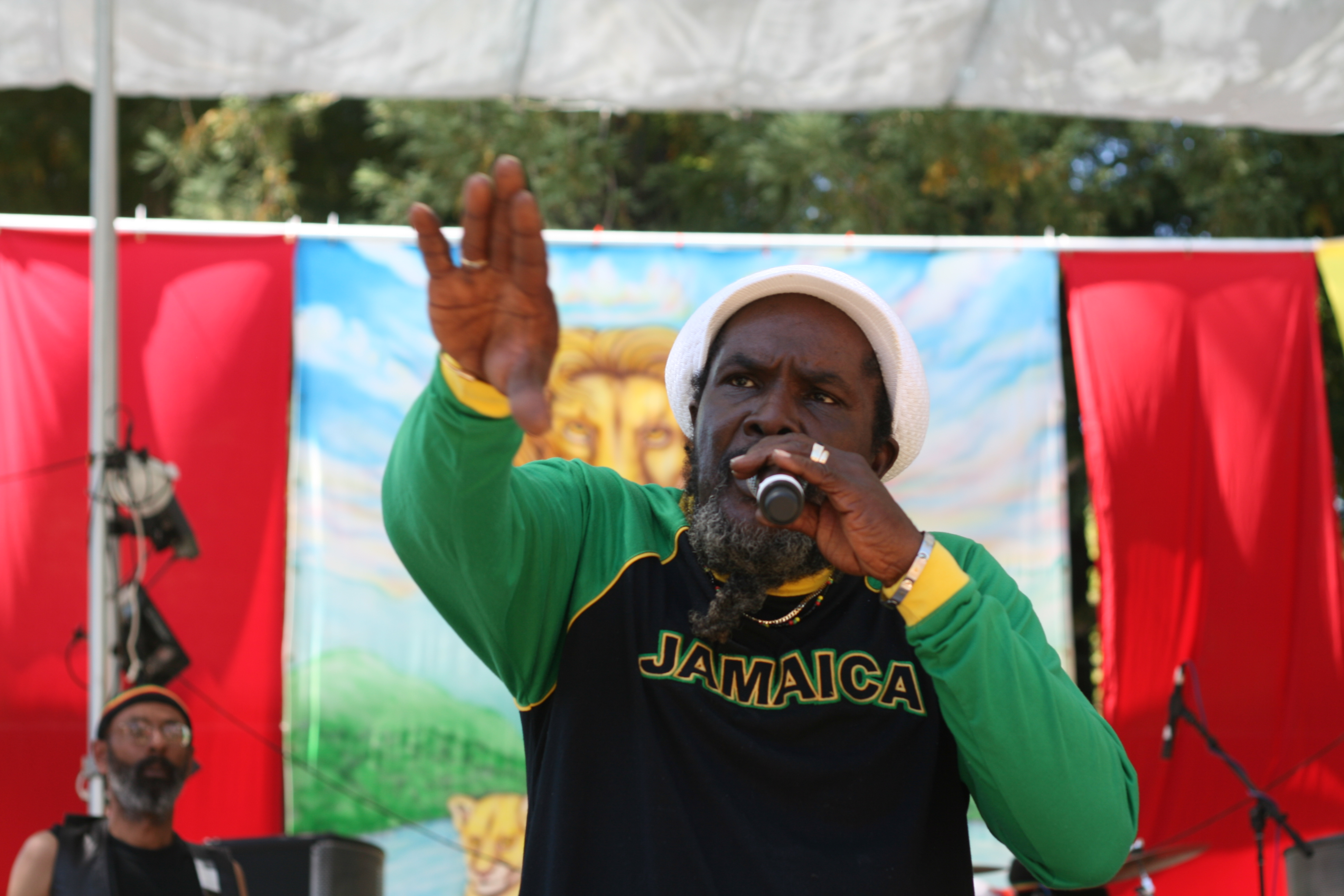
- Performing at Reggae on the River in 2010

Background information
- Born: Pablo Henry; 28 June 1948 (age 77)
- Origin: Manchester, Jamaica
- Genres: Reggae
- Instrument: Vocals

Pablo Moses (born Pablo Henry, 28 June 1948, Manchester, Jamaica) is a Jamaican roots reggae vocalist.

Moses got his start in music performing with informal school bands. He and Don Prendes formed a group and entered talent shows, performing under the name, "The Canaries". Moses released a number of records over several decades, but he is best known for his debut, 1975's Revolutionary Dream, produced by Geoffrey Chung, which included "I Man A Grasshopper", engineered at The Black Ark by Lee "Scratch" Perry. His 1980 follow up, A Song, was well received by his fans and music critics. Also well received was the single "Ready, Aim, Fire" off his 1983 album In The Future.

Reviewing the 1978 I Love I Bring LP in Christgau's Record Guide: Rock Albums of the Seventies (1981), Robert Christgau said "a lot of these charming, moralistic reggae ditties have the lyrical and melodic simplicity of Sunday School hymns—'Be Not a Dread' could almost be a roots 'Jesus Loves the Little Children.' And whoever devised the synthesizer riffs that set off Moses's spacey singsong deserves a gold star."

== Album discography ==
- Revolutionary Dream (1976, Jigsaw) (also released in 1978 as I Love I Bring)
- A Song (1980, Island)
- Pave The Way (1981, Island/Mango)
- In The Future (1983, Alligator/Mercury)
- Tension (1985, Alligator/Mercury)
- Live to Love (1988, Rohit)
- We Refuse (1990, Profile)
- Charlie (1990, Profile)
- Confession of a Rastaman (1993, Musidisc)
- Mission (1995, RAS)
- Reggae Live Sessions (1998, CRS)
- The Rebirth (2010)
- The Itinuation (2017)
