= Glen Mills =

Jamaican track and field coach

Glen Mills OD (born 14 August 1949) is a sprinting athletics coach from Jamaica. He was the head coach of the Jamaican Olympic athletics team between 1987 and 2009. He is currently head coach of the Racers Track Club which includes world and Olympic record holder Usain Bolt and the 100-metre World Champion Yohan Blake. Other athletes that he has coached in the past include Kim Collins, and Ray Stewart.

== Early years ==
Mills enjoyed athletics from an early age and, after moving to Camperdown High School, promptly joined the sprinting team at age 13. After his first year he was dissatisfied with his performances and gave up on the idea of becoming a professional sprinter. Despite this setback Mills was still enamoured with athletics and frequently attended the practice meetings to watch the others run. The high school coach, Henry McDonald Messam, noticed his interest and reluctance to participate and so assigned him various tasks and chores to keep him busy. Two years after, Mills had learnt well from the head coach and was given the job of coaching a class of younger track and field athletes. He retained the job after graduation, progressing to form an official part of the Camperdown High School coaching staff. The arrival of a new head of the sports department threatened Mills coaching opportunities and he was sacked in favour of a more experienced coach. The move backfired as many of the school's better athletes chose to stand by Mills, training with him at his new, unofficial training ground. Mills was quickly reinstated at the school and went on to train many successful sprinters, including Olympic silver medallist Raymond Stewart.

By the early 1970s, Mills had trained a significant number of male sprinters in the national junior team. The Jamaica Amateur Athletic Association (JAAA) called on him to work on the team, for the CARIFTA Games. Following this appointment Mills became a prominent coach in the Jamaican athletics scene. He continued to work on his coaching style and earned a diploma from the International Olympic Committee training centre in Mexico and a qualification in High-Level Sprint Tech training at the IAAF Training Centre in Puerto Rico. During his time as a coach in Jamaica he has worked with a number of Caribbean athletes including Yohan Blake, Aleen Bailey, Xavier Brown, Leroy Reid and Kim Collins. In addition, Mills also coached British sprinter Dwain Chambers when his athletics ban expired.

== Training Bolt ==
Mills was approached by Usain Bolt shortly after the Athens Olympics and he became the sprinter's coach in late 2004. Bolt was initially a 200 metres specialist but Mills suggested that his young charge should improve his stamina to run over 400 metres. With upcoming competitions for Bolt, there was no time for him to prepare for 400m and Bolt asked if he could run the 100m. Bolt completed 100m in 10.03, an excellent time without any explosive training. At the 2007 Jamaican Championships in June, Bolt broke Donald Quarrie's 36-year-old record by 0.11 seconds, running 19.75 seconds. Mills agreed to Bolt's demands and let him run the 100 m event. The acceptance of the request paid dividends for both sprinter and coach as Mills was impressed with Bolt's new drive and focus in training. By the end of 2007, Mills was pleased with Bolt's performances and the coaching had improved his technique, particularly with a more efficient stride frequency and better balancing. In a trade-off the two agreed to a two part training programme in preparation for the 2008 Beijing Olympics. Mills would help Bolt work on his speed for the 100 m initially then turn his focus to the stamina needed for the 200 m. The program paid off as Bolt set three world records and took gold in both 100 m and 200 m events in Beijing. Bolt praised Mills, saying it was his coaching which made him improve, not only as an athlete, but also as a person. Despite Bolt's unprecedented achievements in Beijing, Mills still felt he could improve if his stride frequency was further improved and his technique perfected.

Mills stepped down as the Olympic Jamaican athletics coach in late 2009, having overseen athletes to 71 world championship and 33 Olympic medals in his 22 years in the role. He said other prominent coaches deserved a chance at undertaking the position and decided he wanted to focus more on his Racers Track Club team.

== Drug controversy ==
In June 2009, five Jamaican athletes were found positive for banned substances. At least two of the athletes belong to the Racers Track Club and were coached by Mills. The athletes were later revealed to be Yohan Blake, Marvin Anderson, Allodin Fothergill, Lansford Spence and Sheri-Ann Brooks, who all tested positive for the stimulant Methylhexanamine, a compound similar to Tuaminoheptane, and were subsequently banned for three months by the Jamaica Anti-Doping Commission.

== Awards ==
- NACAC Coach of the Year 2008
