= July 2011 in sports =

<<	July 2011					>>
Su	Mo	Tu	We	Th	Fr	Sa
					1	2
3	4	5	6	7	8	9
10	11	12	13	14	15	16
17	18	19	20	21	22	23
24	25	26	27	28	29	30
31
Sports

This list shows notable sports-related deaths, events, and notable outcomes that occurred in July of 2011.

== Deaths in July ==
- 5: Mika Myllylä
- 6: John Mackey
- 7: Dick Williams

== Sporting seasons ==
=== Australian rules football 2011 ===
- Australian Football League

=== Auto racing 2011 ===
- Formula One
- Sprint Cup
- Nationwide Series
- Camping World Truck Series
- IRL IndyCar Series
- World Rally Championship
- WTCC
- V8 Supercar
- Formula Two
- GP2 Series
- GP3 Series
- American Le Mans
- Le Mans Series
- Rolex Sports Car Series
- FIA GT1 World Championship
- Auto GP
- World Series by Renault
- Deutsche Tourenwagen Masters
- Super GT

=== Baseball 2011 ===
- Major League Baseball
- Nippon Professional Baseball

=== Basketball 2011 ===
- WNBA
- Philippines professional:
  - Governors Cup
- Philippines collegiate:
  - NCAA
  - UAAP

=== Canadian football 2011 ===
- Canadian Football League

=== Cricket 2011 ===
- England:
  - County Championship
  - Clydesdale Bank 40
  - Friends Life t20

=== Football (soccer) 2011 ===
National teams competitions

- 2011 Copa América
- UEFA Euro 2012 qualifying
- 2012 Africa Cup of Nations qualification
- 2014 FIFA World Cup qualification

International clubs competitions

- UEFA (Europe) Champions League
- UEFA Europa League
- AFC (Asia) Champions League
- AFC Cup
- CAF (Africa) Champions League
- CAF Confederation Cup
- CONCACAF (North & Central America) Champions League

Domestic (national) competitions

- Brazil
- Japan
- Norway
- Russia
- Scotland
- Major League Soccer (USA & Canada)
- Women's Professional Soccer (USA)

=== Golf 2011 ===
- PGA Tour
- European Tour
- LPGA Tour
- Champions Tour

=== Motorcycle racing 2011 ===
- Moto GP
- Superbike World Championship
- Supersport World Championship

=== Rugby league 2011 ===
- Super League
- NRL

=== Rugby union 2011 ===
- Super Rugby
- Currie Cup
- ITM Cup

=== Tennis 2011 ===
- ATP World Tour
- WTA Tour

=== Volleyball 2011 ===
National teams competitions

- World League
- Men's European League
- Women's European League

== Days of the month ==
=== July 31, 2011 (Sunday) ===
==== Auto racing ====
- Formula One:
  - Hungarian Grand Prix in Mogyoród, Hungary: (1) Jenson Button (GBR) (McLaren–Mercedes) (2) Sebastian Vettel (GER) (Red Bull–Renault) (3) Fernando Alonso (ESP) (Ferrari)
    - Drivers' championship standings (after 11 of 19 races): (1) Vettel 234 points (2) Mark Webber (AUS) (Red Bull-Renault) 149 (3) Lewis Hamilton (GBR) (McLaren-Mercedes) 146
- Sprint Cup Series:
  - Brickyard 400 in Speedway, Indiana: (1) (Wisconsin) Paul Menard (Chevrolet; Richard Childress Racing) (2) (California) Jeff Gordon (Chevrolet; Hendrick Motorsports) (3) (New York (state)) Regan Smith (Chevrolet; Furniture Row Racing)
    - Drivers' championship standings (after 20 of 36 races): (1) (Missouri) Carl Edwards (Ford; Roush Fenway Racing) 682 points (2) (California) Jimmie Johnson (Chevrolet; Hendrick Motorsports) 671 (3) (California) Kevin Harvick (Chevrolet; Richard Childress Racing) 670
- World Touring Car Championship:
  - Race of Germany in Oschersleben:
    - Race 1: (1) Yvan Muller (FRA) (Chevrolet; Chevrolet Cruze) (2) Robert Huff (GBR) (Chevrolet; Chevrolet Cruze) (3) Gabriele Tarquini (ITA) (Lukoil – SUNRED; SEAT León)
    - Race 2: (1) Franz Engstler (GER) (Engstler Motorsport; BMW 320 TC) (2) Alain Menu (SUI) (Chevrolet; Chevrolet Cruze) (3) Tarquini
      - Drivers' championship standings (after 8 of 12 rounds): (1) Huff 289 points (2) Muller 283 (3) Menu 220

==== Basketball ====
- FIBA Under-19 World Championship for Women in Puerto Montt, Chile:
  - 3rd place game: Australia 67–70 (bronze) **Brazil**
  - Final: (silver) Spain 46–69 (gold) **United States**
    - The United States win the title for the fourth consecutive time, and fifth time overall.
- FIBA Europe Under-18 Championship in Wrocław, Poland:
  - Bronze medal game: Italy 65–69 (bronze) **Turkey**
  - Final: (gold) **Spain** 71–65 (silver) Serbia
    - Spain win the title for the first time since 2004, and third time overall.

==== Cricket ====
- India in England:
  - 2nd Test in Nottingham, day 3: England 221 & 441/6 (101 overs; Ian Bell 159); India 288. England lead by 374 runs with 4 wickets remaining.
- ICC Intercontinental Cup, round 1:
  - In Nairobi, day 4: United Arab Emirates 213 & 439/8d; Kenya 219 & 167 (61.1 overs). **United Arab Emirates win by 266 runs.**

==== Cycling ====
- UCI World Tour:
  - Tour de Pologne, stage 1: (gold) Marcel Kittel (GER) (Skil–Shimano) 2h 07' 26" (silver) Alexander Kristoff (NOR) (BMC Racing Team) s.t. (bronze) Francesco Chicchi (ITA) (Quick-Step) s.t.
    - General classification (after stage 1): (1) Kittel 2h 07' 16" (2) Kristoff + 4" (3) Adrian Kurek (POL) (Team Poland BGŻ) + 5"
- UCI Women's Road World Cup:
  - Open de Suède Vårgårda, Road Race: (gold) Annemiek van Vleuten (NED) (Nederland bloeit) 3h 19' 49" (silver) Ellen van Dijk (NED) (HTC–Highroad Women) s.t. (bronze) Nicole Cooke (GBR) s.t.

==== Equestrianism ====
- Royal International Horse Show in Hickstead, United Kingdom:
  - Show jumping – King Georges V Gold Cup (Grand Prix) (CSIO 5*): (gold) Kent Farrington (USA) on Uceko (silver) Robert Smith (GBR) on Talan (bronze) Leon Thijssen (NED) on Tyson
  - Dressage – World Dressage Masters (CDI 5*):
    - Grand Prix Freestyle (A-Final): (gold) Adelinde Cornelissen (NED) on Parzival (silver) Carl Hester (GBR) on Uthopia (bronze) Emma Hindle (GBR) on Lancet
    - Grand Prix Spécial (B-Final): (gold) Charlotte Dujardin (GBR) on Valegro (silver) Leida Collins-Strijk (NED) on On Top (bronze) Sander Marijnissen (NED) on Moedwil

==== Extreme sports ====
- X Games XVII in Los Angeles (USA unless stated):
  - Hometown Heroes Amateur Skateboard Street: (gold) Julian Christianson 88.33 (silver) Brendon Villanueva 86.66 (bronze) Dan Coe 80.00
  - RallyCross: (gold) Brian Deegan 5:02.585 (silver) Tanner Foust 5:08.816 (bronze) Marcus Grönholm (FIN) 5:09.213
  - BMX Street: (gold) Garrett Reynolds 92 (silver) Dennis Enarson 85 (bronze) Dakota Roche 84
  - Skateboard Game of SK8: (gold) Ryan Decenzo (CAN) (silver) Brandon Westgate (bronze) Silas Baxter-Neal
  - Men's Moto X Enduro: (gold) Taddy Blazusiak (POL) 9:06.439 (silver) Mike Brown 9:20.930 (bronze) Justin Soule 9:33.448
  - Women's Moto X Enduro: (gold) Maria Forsberg 8:31.375 (silver) Tarah Gieger (PUR) 9:37.734 (bronze) Kacy Martinez 10:01.286

==== Football (soccer) ====
- FIFA U-20 World Cup in Colombia:
  - Group C in Manizales:
    - Costa Rica 1–4 Spain
    - Australia 1–1 Ecuador
  - Group D in Armenia:
    - Nigeria 5–0 Guatemala
    - Croatia 0–2 Saudi Arabia
- UEFA Women's Under-17 Championship in Nyon, Switzerland:
  - Third place match: Iceland 2–8 (bronze) **Germany**
  - Final: (gold) **Spain** 1–0 (silver) France
    - Spain win the title for the second successive time.
- CAF Confederation Cup, Group stage, Matchday 2:
  - Group A:
    - Inter Luanda (Angola) 1–0 (Ivory Coast) ASEC Mimosas
    - Club Africain (Tunisia) 0–0 (Nigeria) Kaduna United
      - Standings (after 2 matches): Inter Luanda 4 points, Club Africain, Kaduna United 2, ASEC Mimosas 1.
  - Group B: Motema Pembe (Democratic Republic of the Congo) 1–1 (Morocco) Maghreb de Fès
    - Standings (after 2 matches): (Nigeria) Sunshine Stars 6 points, Maghreb de Fès 4, Motema Pembe 1, (Algeria) JS Kabylie 0.

==== Golf ====
- Women's majors:
  - Ricoh Women's British Open in Carnoustie, Angus, Scotland:
    - Leaderboard after final round: (1) Yani Tseng (TWN) 272 (−16) (2) Brittany Lang (USA) 276 (−12) (3) Sophie Gustafson (SWE) 277 (−11)
      - Tseng wins her second consecutive British Open, for her second major of the year, and fifth of her career.
- Senior majors:
  - U.S. Senior Open Championship in Toledo, Ohio:
    - Leaderboard after final round (all USA): (1) Olin Browne 269 (−15) (2) Mark O'Meara 272 (−12) (3) Mark Calcavecchia 273 (−11)
      - Browne wins his first senior major.
- PGA Tour:
  - Greenbrier Classic in White Sulphur Springs, West Virginia:
    - Winner: Scott Stallings (USA) 270 (−10)^{PO}
      - Stallings defeats Bob Estes (USA) & Bill Haas (USA) on the first playoff hole to win his first PGA Tour title.
- European Tour:
  - Irish Open in Killarney, Ireland:
    - Winner: Simon Dyson (ENG) 269 (−15)
      - Dyson wins his fifth European Tour title.

==== Motorcycle racing ====
- Superbike:
  - Silverstone World Championship round in Silverstone, Great Britain:
    - Race 1: (1) Carlos Checa (ESP) (Ducati 1098R) (2) Eugene Laverty (IRL) (Yamaha YZF-R1) (3) Marco Melandri (ITA) (Yamaha YZF-R1)
    - Race 2: (1) Checa (2) Laverty (3) Melandri
      - Riders' championship standings (after 9 of 13 rounds): (1) Checa 343 points (2) Max Biaggi (ITA) (Aprilia RSV4) 281 (3) Melandri 272
- Supersport:
  - Silverstone World Championship round in Silverstone, Great Britain: (1) Chaz Davies (GBR) (Yamaha YZF-R6) (2) David Salom (ESP) (Kawasaki Ninja ZX-6R) (3) Fabien Foret (FRA) (Honda CBR600RR)
    - Riders' championship standings (after 8 of 12 rounds): (1) Davies 146 points (2) Salom 104 (3) Foret 101

==== Swimming ====
- World Aquatics Championships in Shanghai, China:
  - Women's 50m breaststroke: (gold) Jessica Hardy (USA) 30.19 (silver) Yuliya Yefimova (RUS) 30.49 (bronze) Rebecca Soni (USA) 30.58
    - Hardy wins the event for the second time.
  - Men's 400m individual medley: (gold) Ryan Lochte (USA) 4:07.13 (silver) Tyler Clary (USA) 4:11.17 (bronze) Yuya Horihata (JPN) 4:11.98
    - Lochte wins the event for the second successive time, and his fifth title of the championships and twelfth world title overall.
  - Women's 50m freestyle: (gold) Therese Alshammar (SWE) 24.14 (silver) Ranomi Kromowidjojo (NED) 24.27 (bronze) Marleen Veldhuis (NED) 24.49
    - Alshammar wins her second world title, and becomes the oldest woman to win an individual title at the age of 33.
  - Men's 50m backstroke: (gold) Liam Tancock (GBR) 24.50 (silver) Camille Lacourt (FRA) 24.57 (bronze) Gerhard Zandberg (RSA) 24.66
    - Tancock wins the event for the second successive time.
  - Men's 1500m freestyle: (gold) Sun Yang (CHN) 14:34.14 (WR) (silver) Ryan Cochrane (CAN) 14:44.46 (bronze) Gergő Kis (HUN) 14:45.66
    - Sun wins his second title of the championships.
    - Sun breaks the longest-standing long-course world record previously held by Grant Hackett (AUS) from July 2001.
  - Women's 400m individual medley: (gold) Elizabeth Beisel (USA) 4:31.78 (silver) Hannah Miley (GBR) 4:34.22 (bronze) Stephanie Rice (AUS) 4:34.23
  - Men's 4 × 100 m medley relay: (gold) United States (Nick Thoman, Mark Gangloff, Michael Phelps, Nathan Adrian) 3:32.06 (silver) Australia (Hayden Stoeckel, Brenton Rickard, Geoff Huegill, James Magnussen) 3:32.26 (bronze) Germany (Helge Meeuw, Hendrik Feldwehr, Benjamin Starke, Paul Biedermann) 3:32.60
    - Phelps wins the event for the fourth time, and his fourth title of the championships and 26th world title overall.
    - Gangloff wins the event for the third time.
    - Adrian wins the event for the second successive time and his third world title.

==== Tennis ====
- ATP World Tour:
  - Credit Agricole Suisse Open Gstaad in Gstaad, Switzerland:
    - Final: **Marcel Granollers** (ESP) def. Fernando Verdasco (ESP) 6–4, 3–6, 6–3
      - Granollers wins his second ATP Tour title, and first since 2008.
  - Farmers Classic in Los Angeles, United States:
    - Final: **Ernests Gulbis** (LAT) def. Mardy Fish (USA) 5–7, 6–4, 6–4
      - Gulbis wins his second ATP Tour title.
  - Studena Croatia Open in Umag, Croatia:
    - Final: **Alexandr Dolgopolov** (UKR) def. Marin Čilić (CRO) 6–4, 3–6, 6–3
      - Dolgopolov wins his first ATP Tour title.
- WTA Tour:
  - Bank of the West Classic in Stanford, United States:
    - Final: **Serena Williams** (USA) def. Marion Bartoli (FRA) 7–5, 6–1
      - Williams wins her 38th career title.
  - Citi Open in Washington, D.C., United States:
    - Final: **Nadia Petrova** (RUS) def. Shahar Pe'er (ISR) 7–5, 6–2
      - Petrova wins her tenth WTA Tour title, and first since 2008.

==== Volleyball ====
- FIVB Women's Junior World Championship in Lima, Peru:
  - 3rd place match: (bronze) **China** 3–1 United States
  - Final: (gold) **Italy** 3–1 (silver) Brazil
    - Italy win the title for the first time.

=== July 30, 2011 (Saturday) ===
==== Auto racing ====
- Nationwide Series:
  - Kroger 200 in Clermont, Indiana: (1) (Michigan) Brad Keselowski (Dodge; Penske Racing) (2) (Texas) James Buescher (Chevrolet; Turner Motorsports) (3) (Mississippi) Ricky Stenhouse Jr. (Ford; Roush Fenway Racing)
    - Drivers' championship standings (after 21 of 34 races): (1) Stenhouse Jr. 740 points (2) (Georgia (U.S. state)) Reed Sorenson (Chevrolet; Turner Motorsports) 737 (3) (Virginia) Elliott Sadler (Chevrolet; Kevin Harvick Incorporated) 716
- World Rally Championship:
  - Rally Finland in Jyväskylä, Finland: (1) Sébastien Loeb (FRA)/Daniel Elena (MON) (Citroën DS3 WRC) (2) Jari-Matti Latvala (FIN)/Miikka Anttila (FIN) (Ford Fiesta RS WRC) (3) Sébastien Ogier (FRA)/Julien Ingrassia (FRA) (Citroën DS3 WRC)
    - Drivers' championship standings (after 8 of 13 rallies): (1) Loeb 171 points (2) Mikko Hirvonen (FIN) (Ford Fiesta RS WRC) 144 (3) Ogier 140

==== Cricket ====
- India in England:
  - 2nd Test in Nottingham, day 2: England 221 & 24/1 (11 overs); India 288 (91.1 overs; Rahul Dravid 117, Stuart Broad 6/46). England trail by 43 runs with 9 wickets remaining.
    - Broad bowls the 39th hat-trick in Test cricket, claiming the wickets of Mahendra Singh Dhoni, Harbhajan Singh and Praveen Kumar. Broad becomes the twelfth Englishman to achieve a hat-trick and the first since Ryan Sidebottom in 2008.
- ICC Intercontinental Cup, round 1:
  - In Nairobi, day 3: United Arab Emirates 213 & 439/8d (114.2 overs; Saqib Ali 153, Khurram Khan 113, Amjad Javed 100); Kenya 219 & 76/4 (25 overs). Kenya require another 358 runs with 6 wickets remaining.

==== Cycling ====
- UCI World Tour:
  - Clásica de San Sebastián: (gold) Philippe Gilbert (BEL) (Omega Pharma–Lotto) 5h 48' 52" (silver) Carlos Barredo (ESP) (Rabobank) + 12" (bronze) Greg Van Avermaet (BEL) (BMC Racing Team) + 14"
    - UCI World Tour standings (after 18 of 27 races): (1) Cadel Evans (AUS) (BMC Racing Team) 574 points (2) Gilbert 482 (3) Alberto Contador (ESP) (Saxo Bank–SunGard) 471

==== Extreme sports ====
- X Games XVII in Los Angeles (USA unless stated):
  - BMX Park: (gold) Daniel Dhers (VEN) 81 (silver) Dennis Enarson 81 (bronze) Scotty Cranmer 72
  - Rally Car Racing: (gold) Liam Doran (GBR) (silver) Marcus Grönholm (FIN) (bronze) David Higgins (GBR)
  - Skateboard Street: (gold) Nyjah Huston 91.66 (silver) Luan Oliveira (BRA) 91.00 (bronze) Ryan Sheckler 89.00
  - Women's Moto X Racing: (gold) Vicki Golden 3:43.258 (silver) Tarah Gieger (PUR) 3:47.636 (bronze) Livia Lancelot (FRA) 3:54.441
  - Skateboard Vert: (gold) Shaun White 93.00 (silver) Pierre-Luc Gagnon (CAN) 91.66 (bronze) Bucky Lasek 87.66
  - Moto X Speed & Style: (gold) Nate Adams 90.00 (silver) Mike Mason 88.53 (bronze) Ronnie Faisst 91.01

==== Football (soccer) ====
- FIFA U-20 World Cup in Colombia:
  - Group A in Bogotá:
    - Mali 0–2 South Korea
    - Colombia 4–1 France
  - Group B in Cali:
    - Cameroon 1–1 New Zealand
    - Portugal 0–0 Uruguay
- CAF Champions League Group stage, Matchday 2:
  - Group A: Coton Sport (Cameroon) 2–3 (Nigeria) Enyimba
    - Standings (after 2 matches): Enyimba, (Sudan) Al-Hilal 4 points, Coton Sport, (Morocco) Raja Casablanca 1.
  - Group B:
    - Wydad Casablanca (Morocco) 4–0 (Algeria) MC Alger
    - Espérance ST (Tunisia) 1–0 (Egypt) Al-Ahly
      - Standings (after 2 matches): Wydad Casablanca, Espérance ST 4 points, Al-Ahly, MC Alger 1.

==== Golf ====
- Women's majors:
  - Ricoh Women's British Open in Carnoustie, Angus, Scotland:
    - Leaderboard after third round: (1) Caroline Masson (GER) 201 (−15) (2) Yani Tseng (TWN) 203 (−13) (T3) Catriona Matthew (SCO) & Inbee Park (KOR) 207 (−9)
- Senior majors:
  - U.S. Senior Open Championship in Toledo, Ohio:
    - Leaderboard after third round (USA unless stated): (1) Olin Browne 198 (−15) (2) Mark O'Meara 200 (−13) (T3) Mark Calcavecchia, Peter Senior (AUS), Joey Sindelar & Jeff Sluman 204 (−9)

==== Handball ====
- Men's Junior World Championship in Thessaloniki, Greece:
  - 3rd place game: (bronze) **Tunisia** 24–18 Egypt
  - Final: (gold) **Germany** 27–18 (silver) Denmark
    - Germany win the title for the second successive time.

==== Mixed martial arts ====
- Strikeforce: Fedor vs. Henderson in Hoffman Estates, Illinois, United States:
  - Heavyweight bout: **Dan Henderson** (USA) def. Fedor Emelianenko (RUS) via TKO (punches)
  - Women's Welterweight Championship bout: **Miesha Tate** (USA) def. Marloes Coenen (NED) (c) via submission (arm triangle)
  - Middleweight bout: **Tim Kennedy** (USA) def. Robbie Lawler (USA) via unanimous decision (30–27, 30–27, 30–27)
  - Welterweight bout: **Tyron Woodley** (USA) def. Paul Daley (ENG) via unanimous decision (29–28, 29–28, 29–28)
  - Welterweight bout: **Tarec Saffiedine** (BEL) def. Scott Smith (USA) via unanimous decision (30–27, 30–27, 30–26)

==== Rugby union ====
- Tri Nations Series:
  - New Zealand 40–7 South Africa in Wellington
    - The All Blacks' Dan Carter reclaims the career lead in Test points from England's Jonny Wilkinson.
    - Standings: New Zealand, Australia 5 points (1 match), South Africa 0 (2)

==== Swimming ====
- World Aquatics Championships in Shanghai, China:
  - Women's 50m butterfly: (gold) Inge Dekker (NED) 25.71 (silver) Therese Alshammar (SWE) 25.76 (bronze) Mélanie Henique (FRA) 25.86
    - Dekker wins her second title of the championships and third world title overall.
  - Men's 50m freestyle: (gold) César Cielo (BRA) 21.52 (silver) Luca Dotto (ITA) 21.90 (bronze) Alain Bernard (FRA) 21.92
    - Cielo wins the event for the second successive time, and his second title of the championships and fourth world title overall.
  - Women's 200m backstroke: (gold) Missy Franklin (USA) 2:05.10 (AM) (silver) Belinda Hocking (AUS) 2:06.06 (bronze) Sharon van Rouwendaal (NED) 2:07.78
    - Franklin wins her second title of the championships.
  - Men's 100m butterfly: (gold) Michael Phelps (USA) 50.71 (silver) Konrad Czerniak (POL) 51.15 (bronze) Tyler McGill (USA) 51.26
    - Phelps wins the event for the third successive time, and his third title of the championships and 25th world title overall.
  - Women's 800m freestyle: (gold) Rebecca Adlington (GBR) 8:17.51 (silver) Lotte Friis (DEN) 8:18.20 (bronze) Kate Ziegler (USA) 8:23.36
  - Women's 4 × 100 m medley relay: (gold) United States (Natalie Coughlin, Rebecca Soni, Dana Vollmer, Franklin) 3:52.36 (silver) China (Zhao Jing, Ji Liping, Lu Ying, Tang Yi) 3:55.61 (bronze) Australia (Hocking, Leisel Jones, Alicia Coutts, Merindah Dingjan) 3:57.13
    - The United States win the event for the first time since 1998.
    - Coughlin wins her sixth world title.
    - Soni wins her third title of the championships and fourth world title overall.
    - Vollmer wins her second title of the championships and third world title overall.
    - Franklin wins her third title of the championships.

==== Volleyball ====
- Asian Men's Club Championship in Palembang, Indonesia:
  - 3rd place match: Osaka Blazers Sakai (Japan) 0–3 (bronze) (China) **Shanghai Tang Dynasty**
  - Final: (silver) Almaty (Kazakhstan) 0–3 (gold) (Iran) **Paykan Tehran**
    - Paykan Tehran win the title for the sixth successive time and seventh time overall.

==== Water polo ====
- World Aquatics Championships in Shanghai, China:
  - Men's tournament:
    - 7th place game: Germany 5–8 **Montenegro**
    - 5th place game: United States 10–11 **Spain**
    - Bronze medal game: Hungary 11–12 (bronze) **Croatia**
    - Gold medal game: (silver) Serbia 7–8 (gold) **Italy**
      - Italy win the title for the third time.

=== July 29, 2011 (Friday) ===
==== Athletics ====
- Samsung Diamond League:
  - DN Galan in Stockholm, Sweden:
    - Men:
      - 110m hurdles: Jason Richardson (USA) 13.17
      - 200m: Usain Bolt (JAM) 20.03
      - 400m: Jermaine Gonzales (JAM) 44.69
      - 1500m: Silas Kiplagat (KEN) 3:33.94
      - 3000m steeplechase: Paul Kipsiele Koech (KEN) 8:05.92
      - Discus throw: Virgilijus Alekna (LTU) 65.05m
      - High jump: Ivan Ukhov (RUS) 2.34m
      - Javelin throw: Andreas Thorkildsen (NOR) 88.43m
      - Long jump: Mitchell Watt (AUS) 8.54m
    - Women:
      - 100m: Carmelita Jeter (USA) 11.15
      - 400m hurdles: Kaliese Spencer (JAM) 53.74
      - 800m: Kenia Sinclair (JAM) 1:58.21
      - 5000m: Vivian Cheruiyot (KEN) 14:20.87
      - Pole vault: Yelena Isinbayeva (RUS) 4.76m
      - Triple jump: Olha Saladukha (UKR) 15.06m

==== Cricket ====
- India in England:
  - 2nd Test in Nottingham, day 1: England 221 (68.4 overs); India 24/1 (15 overs). India trail by 197 runs with 9 wickets remaining in the 1st innings.
- ICC Intercontinental Cup, round 1:
  - In Nairobi, day 2: United Arab Emirates 213 & 155/3 (46 overs); Kenya 219 (70.5 overs). United Arab Emirates lead by 149 runs with 7 wickets remaining.

==== Cycling ====
- UCI Women's Road World Cup:
  - Open de Suède Vårgårda, Team Time Trial: (gold) | **HTC–Highroad Women** Ellen van Dijk, Judith Arndt, Charlotte Becker, Amber Neben (silver) **AA-Drink Cycling Team** Lucinda Brand, Linda Melanie Villumsen, Kirsten Wild, Trixi Worrack (bronze) **Garmin–Cervélo** Elizabeth Armitstead, Noemi Cantele, Sharon Laws, Emma Pooley, Iris Slapendel

==== Equestrianism ====
- Royal International Horse Show in Hickstead, United Kingdom:
  - Show jumping – FEI Nations Cup:
    - Nations Cup of the United Kingdom (CSIO 5*): (gold) Germany (Janne Friederike Meyer, Holger Wulschner, Philipp Weishaupt, Marcus Ehning) (silver) France (Olivier Guillon, Roger-Yves Bost, Pénélope Leprevost, Kevin Staut) (bronze) United States (Christine McCrea, Kent Farrington, Laura Kraut, Beezie Madden)
      - Standings (after 6 of 8 events): (1) Netherlands 42 points (2) Germany 37 (3) Ireland 32.5

==== Extreme sports ====
- X Games XVII in Los Angeles (USA unless stated):
  - Women's Skateboard Street: (gold) Marisa Dal Santo 88.00 (silver) Alexis Sablone 84.33 (bronze) Leticia Bufoni (BRA) 78.00
  - Moto X Freestyle: (gold) Nate Adams 91 (silver) Adam Jones 86 (bronze) Dany Torres (ESP) 86
  - BMX Vert: (gold) Jamie Bestwick (GBR) 92 (silver) Steve McCann (AUS) 90 (bronze) Vince Byron (AUS) 79
    - Bestwick wins the gold for the fifth consecutive year.
  - Skateboarding Big Air: (gold) Bob Burnquist (BRA) 92.66 (silver) Adam Taylor 89.66 (bronze) Edgard Pereira (BRA) 87.00

==== Football (soccer) ====
- FIFA U-20 World Cup in Colombia:
  - Group E:
    - Austria 0–0 Panama in Cartagena
    - Brazil 1–1 Egypt in Barranquilla
  - Group F in Medellín:
    - England 0–0 North Korea
    - Argentina 1–0 Mexico
- UEFA European Under-19 Championship in Romania:
  - Semifinals:
    - **Czech Republic** 4–2 Serbia in Mogoşoaia
    - **Spain** 5–0 Republic of Ireland in Chiajna
- CAF Champions League Group stage, Matchday 2:
  - Group A: Al-Hilal (Sudan) 1–0 (Morocco) Raja Casablanca
    - Standings: Al-Hilal 4 points (2 matches), (Nigeria) Enyimba, (Cameroon) Coton Sport 1 (1), Raja Casablanca 1 (2).
- CAF Confederation Cup Group stage, Matchday 2:
  - Group B: JS Kabylie (Algeria) 1–2 (Nigeria) Sunshine Stars
    - Standings: Sunshine Stars 6 points (2 matches), (Morocco) Maghreb de Fès 3 (1), JS Kabylie 0 (2), (Democratic Republic of the Congo) Motema Pembe 0 (1).

==== Golf ====
- Women's majors:
  - Ricoh Women's British Open in Carnoustie, Angus, Scotland:
    - Leaderboard after second round: (1) Caroline Masson (GER) 133 (−11) (T2) Meena Lee (KOR) & Inbee Park (KOR) 134 (−10)
- Senior majors:
  - U.S. Senior Open Championship in Toledo, Ohio:
    - Leaderboard after second round (all USA): (1) Olin Browne 133 (−9) (2) Mark O'Meara 134 (−8) (T3) Michael Allen, Mark Calcavecchia & Joey Sindelar 135 (−7)

==== Swimming ====
- World Aquatics Championships in Shanghai, China:
  - Women's 100m freestyle: (gold) Jeanette Ottesen (DEN) & Aleksandra Gerasimenya (BLR) 53.45 (bronze) Ranomi Kromowidjojo (NED) 53.66
  - Men's 200m backstroke: (gold) Ryan Lochte (USA) 1:52.96 (silver) Ryosuke Irie (JPN) 1:54.11 (bronze) Tyler Clary (USA) 1:54.69
    - Lochte wins the event for the second time, and his third title of the championships and tenth world title overall.
  - Women's 200m breaststroke: (gold) Rebecca Soni (USA) 2:21.47 (silver) Yuliya Yefimova (RUS) 2:22.22 (bronze) Martha McCabe (CAN) 2:24.81
    - Soni wins her second title of the championships, and third world title overall.
  - Men's 200m breaststroke: (gold) Dániel Gyurta (HUN) 2:08.41 (silver) Kosuke Kitajima (JPN) 2:08.63 (bronze) Christian vom Lehn (GER) 2:09.06
    - Gyurta wins the event for the second successive time.
  - Men's 4 × 200 m freestyle relay: (gold) United States (Michael Phelps, Peter Vanderkaay, Ricky Berens, Lochte) 7:02.67 (silver) France (Yannick Agnel, Grégory Mallet, Jérémy Stravius, Fabien Gilot) 7:04.81 (bronze) China (Wang Shun, Zhang Lin, Li Yunqi, Sun Yang) 7:05.67
    - The United States win the event for the fourth successive time, with Phelps, Lochte and Vanderkaay among the winning teams.
    - Phelps wins his second title of the championships and 24th world title overall.
    - Lochte wins his fourth title of the championships and 11th world title overall.
    - Berens wins the event for the second successive time and his third world title overall.

==== Water polo ====
- World Aquatics Championships in Shanghai, China:
  - Women's tournament:
    - 7th place game: Canada 7–8 **Netherlands**
    - 5th place game: United States 5–10 **Australia**
    - Bronze medal game: (bronze) **Russia** 8–7 Italy
    - Gold medal game: (silver) China 8–9 (gold) **Greece**
      - Greece win the title for the first time.

=== July 28, 2011 (Thursday) ===
==== Athletics ====
- Samsung Diamond League:
  - DN Galan in Stockholm, Sweden:
    - Men's shot put: Christian Cantwell (USA) 21.70m
    - Women's shot put: Valerie Adams (NZL) 20.57m

==== Cricket ====
- ICC Intercontinental Cup, round 1:
  - In Nairobi, day 1: United Arab Emirates 213 (67.3 overs); Kenya 91/3 (22.5 overs). Kenya trail by 122 runs with 7 wickets remaining in the 1st innings.

==== Extreme sports ====
- X Games XVII in Los Angeles (USA unless stated):
  - Moto X Step Up: (gold) Matt Buyten 37' 0" (silver) Ronnie Renner 35' 6" (bronze) Myles Richmond & Brian Deegan 35' 6"
  - Skateboard Park: (gold) Raven Tershy 82 (silver) Pedro Barros (BRA) 81 (bronze) Ben Hatchell 75
  - Moto X Best Whip: (gold) Jeremy Stenberg 27% (silver) Todd Potter 24% (bronze) Jarryd McNeil (AUS) 22%
  - Moto X Best Trick: (gold) Jackson Strong (AUS) 95.66 (silver) Cam Sinclair (AUS) 94.66 (bronze) Josh Sheehan (AUS) 93.33
  - BMX Freestyle Big Air: (gold) Steve McCann (AUS) 91.66 (silver) Vince Byron (AUS) 90.66 (bronze) Chad Kagy 89.33

==== Football (soccer) ====
- 2014 FIFA World Cup qualification (AFC) Second round, second leg (first leg scores in parentheses):
  - Myanmar 0–2 (0–2) Oman — Match abandoned after 40 minutes due to crowd trouble.
  - Nepal 1–1 (0–9) **Jordan**. Jordan win 10–1 on aggregate.
  - Laos 1–6 (2–7) **China**. China PR win 13–3 on aggregate.
  - Philippines 1–2 (0–3) **Kuwait**. Kuwait win 5–1 on aggregate.
  - Tajikistan 0–4 (1–2) **Syria**. Syria win 6–1 on aggregate.
  - Kyrgyzstan 0–3 (0–4) **Uzbekistan**. Uzbekistan win 7–0 on aggregate.
  - Bangladesh 2–0 (0–4) **Lebanon**. Lebanon win 4–2 on aggregate.
  - **Indonesia** 4–3 (1–1) Turkmenistan. Indonesia win 5–4 on aggregate.
  - Hong Kong 0–5 (0–3) **Saudi Arabia**. Saudi Arabia win 8–0 on aggregate.
  - Vietnam 2–1 (0–3) **Qatar**. Qatar win 4–2 on aggregate.
  - Malaysia 1–1 (3–5) **Singapore**. Singapore win 6–4 on aggregate.
  - India 2–2 (0–3) **United Arab Emirates**. United Arab Emirates win 5–2 on aggregate.
  - Palestine 2–2 (0–1) **Thailand**. Thailand win 3–2 on aggregate.
  - Maldives 0–1 (0–4) **Iran**. Iran win 5–0 on aggregate.
  - Yemen 0–0 (0–2) **Iraq** in Al Ain, United Arab Emirates. Iraq win 2–0 on aggregate.
- UEFA Women's Under-17 Championship in Nyon, Switzerland:
  - Semifinals:
    - Iceland 0–4 **Spain**
    - Germany 2–2 (5–6 pen.) **France**
- UEFA Europa League third qualifying round, first leg:
  - Śląsk Wrocław (Poland) 0–0 (Bulgaria) Lokomotiv Sofia
  - AEK Larnaca (Cyprus) 3–0 (Czech Republic) Mladá Boleslav
  - Ventspils (Latvia) 1–2 (Serbia) Red Star Belgrade
  - Alania Vladikavkaz (Russia) 1–1 (Kazakhstan) Aktobe
  - Karpaty Lviv (Ukraine) 2–0 (Republic of Ireland) St Patrick's Athletic
  - Olimpija Ljubljana (Slovenia) 1–1 Austria Wien
  - Aalesund (Norway) 4–0 (Sweden) Elfsborg
  - Metalurgist Rustavi (Georgia (country)) 2–5 (France) Rennes
  - Red Bull Salzburg (Austria) 1–0 (Slovakia) Senica
  - Anorthosis (Cyprus) 0–2 (North Macedonia) Rabotnički
  - Sparta Prague (Czech Republic) 5–0 (Bosnia and Herzegovina) Sarajevo
  - Vorskla Poltava (Ukraine) 0–0 (Republic of Ireland) Sligo Rovers
  - Vålerenga (Norway) 0–2 (Greece) PAOK
  - Young Boys (Switzerland) 3–1 (Belgium) Westerlo
  - Bursaspor (Turkey) 2–1 (Belarus) Gomel
  - Hapoel Tel Aviv (Israel) 4–0 (Liechtenstein) Vaduz
  - Omonia (Cyprus) 3–0 (Netherlands) ADO Den Haag
  - Split (Croatia) 0–0 (England) Fulham
  - Levski Sofia (Bulgaria) 2–1 (Slovakia) Spartak Trnava
  - AZ Alkmaar (Netherlands) 2–0 (Czech Republic) Jablonec
  - Gaziantepspor (Turkey) 0–1 (Poland) Legia Warsaw
  - Dinamo București (Romania) 2–2 (Croatia) Varaždin
  - Differdange 03 (Luxembourg) 0–3 (Greece) Olympiacos Volos
  - Paks (Hungary) 1–1 (Scotland) Heart of Midlothian
  - Željezničar (Bosnia and Herzegovina) 0–2 (Israel) Maccabi Tel Aviv
  - Club Brugge (Belgium) 4–1 (Azerbaijan) Qarabağ
  - Mainz 05 (Germany) 1–1 (Romania) Gaz Metan Mediaș
  - Palermo (Italy) 2–2 (Switzerland) Thun
  - Stoke City (England) 1–0 (Croatia) Hajduk Split
  - Nacional (Portugal) 3–0 (Sweden) Häcken
  - Atlético Madrid (Spain) 2–1 (Norway) Strømsgodset
  - Midtjylland (Denmark) 0–0 (Portugal) Vitória Guimarães
  - Ried (Austria) 2–0 (Denmark) Brøndby
  - KR Reykjavík (Iceland) 1–4 (Georgia (country)) Dinamo Tbilisi
- CONCACAF Champions League preliminary round, first leg:
  - Morelia (Mexico) 5–0 (Haiti) Tempête
  - Alianza (El Salvador) 0–1 (United States) FC Dallas
  - Motagua (Honduras) 4–0 (Guatemala) Municipal

==== Golf ====
- Women's majors:
  - Ricoh Women's British Open in Carnoustie, Angus, Scotland:
    - Leaderboard after first round: (1) Meena Lee (KOR) 65 (−7) (2) Brittany Lincicome (USA) 67 (−5) (T3) Sophie Gustafson (SWE), Caroline Masson (GER), Angela Stanford (USA) & Amy Yang (KOR) 68 (−4)
- Senior majors:
  - U.S. Senior Open Championship in Toledo, Ohio:
    - Leaderboard after first round (all USA): (1) Olin Browne 64 (−7) (T2) Michael Allen & Mark O'Meara 66 (−5)

==== Swimming ====
- World Aquatics Championships in Shanghai, China:
  - Men's 200m individual medley: (gold) Ryan Lochte (USA) 1:54.00 (WR) (silver) Michael Phelps (USA) 1:54.16 (bronze) László Cseh (HUN) 1:57.69
    - Lochte wins the event for the second successive time, and his second title of the championships and ninth world title overall.
    - Lochte breaks his own world record by 0.10 seconds and sets the first long-course world record since non-textile swimsuits were outlawed at the end of 2009.
  - Men's 100m freestyle: (gold) James Magnussen (AUS) 47.63 (silver) Brent Hayden (CAN) 47.95 (bronze) William Meynard (FRA) 48.00
    - Magnussen wins his second title of the championships.
  - Women's 200m butterfly: (gold) Jiao Liuyang (CHN) 2:05.55 (silver) Ellen Gandy (GBR) 2:05.59 (bronze) Liu Zige (CHN) 2:05.90
    - Jiao wins her second world championship title.
  - Women's 50m backstroke: (gold) Anastasia Zuyeva (RUS) 27.79 (silver) Aya Terakawa (JPN) 27.93 (bronze) Missy Franklin (USA) 28.01
  - Women's 4 × 200 m freestyle relay: (gold) United States (Franklin, Dagny Knutson, Katie Hoff, Allison Schmitt) 7:46.14 (silver) Australia (Bronte Barratt, Blair Evans, Angie Bainbridge, Kylie Palmer) 7:47.42 (bronze) China (Chen Qian, Pang Jiaying, Liu Jing, Tang Yi) 7:47.66
    - Hoff wins her seventh world championship title.

==== Water polo ====
- World Aquatics Championships in Shanghai, China:
  - Men's tournament:
    - Semifinals:
      - Hungary 14–15 **Serbia**
      - Croatia 8–9 **Italy**
    - Classification 5–8 Semifinals:
      - **United States** 9–8 Germany
      - Montenegro 9–10 **Spain**
    - 11th place game: Romania 15–18 **Japan**
    - 9th place game: Canada 6–8 **Australia**

=== July 27, 2011 (Wednesday) ===
==== American football ====
- The University of North Carolina fires head coach Butch Davis after four seasons, in the midst of an NCAA investigation.

==== Baseball ====
- Major League Baseball: Los Angeles Angels 3, Cleveland Indians 1
  - Ervin Santana pitches the third no-hitter of the season, the first solo no-hitter by an Angels pitcher since Mike Witt's perfect game in 1984 and the first non-shutout no-hitter since Darryl Kile in 1993.

==== Football (soccer) ====
- UEFA Champions League third qualifying round, first leg:
  - HJK Helsinki (Finland) 1–2 (Croatia) Dinamo Zagreb
  - Copenhagen (Denmark) 1–0 (Republic of Ireland) Shamrock Rovers
  - Odense (Denmark) 1–1 (Greece) Panathinaikos
  - Maccabi Haifa (Israel) 2–1 (Slovenia) Maribor
  - Standard Liège (Belgium) 1–1 (Switzerland) Zürich
  - Rosenborg (Norway) 0–1 (Czech Republic) Viktoria Plzeň
  - Benfica (Portugal) 2–0 (Turkey) Trabzonspor
- CONCACAF Champions League preliminary round, first leg:
  - Toronto FC (Canada) 2–1 (Nicaragua) Real Estelí
  - Isidro Metapán (El Salvador) 2–0 Puerto Rico Islanders
  - Santos Laguna (Mexico) 3–1 (Honduras) Olimpia
- (United States) (Canada) 2011 MLS All-Star Game in Harrison, New Jersey: MLS All-Stars 0–4 (England) Manchester United
- (France) Trophée des Champions in Tangier, Morocco: Lille 4–5 **Marseille**
  - Marseille win the title for the second time.

==== Swimming ====
- World Aquatics Championships in Shanghai, China:
  - Men's 200m butterfly: (gold) Michael Phelps (USA) 1:53.34 (silver) Takeshi Matsuda (JPN) 1:54.01 (bronze) Wu Peng (CHN) 1:54.67
    - Phelps wins the event for a record fifth time and his 23rd world championship title.
  - Women's 200m freestyle: (gold) Federica Pellegrini (ITA) 1:55.58 (silver) Kylie Palmer (AUS) 1:56.04 (bronze) Camille Muffat (FRA) 1:56.10
    - Pellegrini wins the event for the second time and her fourth world championship title.
  - Men's 800m freestyle: (gold) Sun Yang (CHN) 7:38.47 (silver) Ryan Cochrane (CAN) 7:41.86 (bronze) Gergő Kis (HUN) 7:44.94
  - Men's 50m breaststroke: (gold) Felipe França Silva (BRA) 27.01 (silver) Fabio Scozzoli (ITA) 27.17 (bronze) Cameron van der Burgh (RSA) 27.19

==== Water polo ====
- World Aquatics Championships in Shanghai, China:
  - Women's tournament:
    - Semifinals:
      - **Greece** 14–11 Italy
      - Russia 12–13 **China**
        - Greece and China reach the final for the first time.
    - Classification 5–8 Semifinals:
      - **United States** 8–4 Canada
      - Netherlands 7–12 **Australia**
    - 11th place game: New Zealand 7–15 **Spain**
    - 9th place game: Cuba 7–12 **Hungary**

=== July 26, 2011 (Tuesday) ===
==== Cricket ====
- ICC Intercontinental Cup One-Day, round 1:
  - 4th Match in Nairobi: Kenya 230/9 (50 overs; Rakep Patel 124); United Arab Emirates 233/6 (46.4 overs). **United Arab Emirates win by 4 wickets.**

==== Football (soccer) ====
- UEFA European Under-19 Championship in Romania (teams in **bold** advance to semifinals):
  - Group A:
    - **Czech Republic** 1–0 Greece in Mogoşoaia
    - **Republic of Ireland** 0–0 Romania in Berceni
      - Final standings: Czech Republic 9 points, Republic of Ireland 4, Greece 3, Romania 1.
  - Group B:
    - Turkey 3–0 **Spain** in Chiajna
    - Belgium 1–1 **Serbia** in Buftea
      - Final standings: Spain 6 points, Serbia, Turkey 4, Belgium 2.
- UEFA Champions League third qualifying round, first leg:
  - Zestaponi (Georgia (country)) 1–1 (Austria) Sturm Graz
  - Ekranas (Lithuania) 0–0 (Belarus) BATE Borisov
  - APOEL (Cyprus) 0–0 (Slovakia) Slovan Bratislava
  - Litex Lovech (Bulgaria) 1–2 (Poland) Wisła Kraków
  - Dynamo Kyiv (Ukraine) 0–2 (Russia) Rubin Kazan
  - Genk (Belgium) 2–1 (Serbia) Partizan
  - Rangers (Scotland) 0–1 (Sweden) Malmö FF
  - Twente (Netherlands) 2–0 (Romania) Vaslui
- UEFA Europa League third qualifying round, first leg: Bnei Yehuda (Israel) 1–0 (Sweden) Helsingborg
- CONCACAF Champions League preliminary round, first leg:
  - San Francisco (Panama) 1–0 (United States) Seattle Sounders FC
  - Herediano (Costa Rica) 8–0 (Guyana) Alpha United

==== Swimming ====
- World Aquatics Championships in Shanghai, China:
  - Men's 200m freestyle: (gold) Ryan Lochte (USA) 1:44.44 (silver) Michael Phelps (USA) 1:44.79 (bronze) Paul Biedermann (GER) 1:44.88
    - Lochte wins his eighth world championship title.
  - Women's 100m backstroke: (gold) Zhao Jing (CHN) 59.05 (silver) Anastasia Zuyeva (RUS) 59.06 (bronze) Natalie Coughlin (USA) 59.15
    - Zhao wins her third world championship title.
  - Women's 1500m freestyle: (gold) Lotte Friis (DEN) 15:49.59 (silver) Kate Ziegler (USA) 15:55.60 (bronze) Li Xuanxu (CHN) 15:58.02
    - Friis wins her second world championship title.
  - Men's 100m backstroke: (gold) Camille Lacourt (FRA) & Jérémy Stravius (FRA) 52.76 (bronze) Ryosuke Irie (JPN) 52.98
  - Women's 100m breaststroke: (gold) Rebecca Soni (USA) 1:05.05 (silver) Leisel Jones (AUS) 1:06.25 (bronze) Ji Liping (CHN) 1:06.52
    - Soni wins the event for the second successive time.

==== Water polo ====
- World Aquatics Championships in Shanghai, China:
  - Men's tournament:
    - Quarterfinals (winners qualify for 2012 Olympics):
      - **Hungary** 9–8 United States
      - **Serbia** 9–4 Germany
      - **Croatia** 9–6 Montenegro
      - **Italy** 10–6 Spain
    - Classification 9–12 Semifinals:
      - Romania 8–12 **Canada**
      - **Australia** 15–9 Japan
    - 13th place game: **Kazakhstan** 9–7 Brazil
    - 15th place game: **China** 9–4 South Africa

=== July 25, 2011 (Monday) ===
==== Cricket ====
- India in England:
  - 1st Test in London, day 5: England 474/8d & 269/6d; India 286 & 261 (96.3 overs; James Anderson 5/65). **England win by 196 runs; lead 4-match series 1–0.**
- ICC Intercontinental Cup One-Day, round 1:
  - 3rd Match in Nairobi: Kenya 210 (49.3 overs; Shoaib Sarwar 5/23); United Arab Emirates 119/8 (35/35 overs; Rajesh Bhudia 5/21). **Kenya win by 66 runs (D/L).**

==== Swimming ====
- World Aquatics Championships in Shanghai, China:
  - Women's 100m butterfly: (gold) Dana Vollmer (USA) 56.87 (silver) Alicia Coutts (AUS) 56.94 (bronze) Lu Ying (CHN) 57.06
    - Vollmer wins her second world championship title.
  - Men's 50m butterfly: (gold) César Cielo (BRA) 23.10 (silver) Matt Targett (AUS) 23.28 (bronze) Geoff Huegill (AUS) 23.35
    - Cielo wins his third world championship title.
  - Women's 200m individual medley: (gold) Ye Shiwen (CHN) 2:08.90 (silver) Alicia Coutts (AUS) 2:09.00 (bronze) Ariana Kukors (USA) 2:09.12
  - Men's 100m breaststroke: (gold) Alexander Dale Oen (NOR) 58.71 (silver) Fabio Scozzoli (ITA) 59.42 (bronze) Cameron van der Burgh (RSA) 59.49
    - Dale Oen becomes the first Norwegian world champion in swimming.

==== Water polo ====
- World Aquatics Championships in Shanghai, China:
  - Women's tournament:
    - Quarterfinals:
      - United States 7–9 **Russia**
      - **Greece** 12–10 Netherlands
      - **Italy** 14–12 Australia
      - Canada 7–9 **China**
    - Classification 9–12 Semifinals:
      - New Zealand 10–11 **Cuba**
      - **Hungary** 17–13 Spain
    - 15th place game: Uzbekistan 5–6 **South Africa**
    - 13th place game: **Kazakhstan** 9–5 Brazil

=== July 24, 2011 (Sunday) ===
==== Athletics ====
- European Junior Championships in Tallinn, Estonia:
  - Men's 800m: (gold) Pierre-Ambroise Bossé (FRA) 1:47.14 (silver) Zan Rudolf (SLO) 1:47.73 (bronze) Johan Rogestedt (SWE) 1:47.88
  - Men's 400m hurdles: (gold) Varg Königsmark (GER) 49.70 (silver) Stef Vanhaeren (BEL) 50.01 (bronze) José Reynaldo Bencosme (ITA) 50.30
  - Men's 3000m steeplechase: (gold) Ilgizar Safiullin (RUS) 8:37.94 (silver) Muhammet Emin Tan (TUR) 8:46.74 (bronze) Martin Grau (GER) 8:48.79
  - Men's 4 × 100 m relay: (gold) France (Vincent Michalet, Jimmy Vicaut, Jeffrey John, Ken Romain) 39.35 (silver) Great Britain (Dannish Walker-Khan, Sam Watts, Adam Gemili, David Bolarinwa) 39.48 (bronze) Poland (Konrad Donczew, Kamil Supiński, Kamil Bijowski, Tomasz Kluczynski) 40.42
  - Men's 4 × 400 m relay: (gold) Italy (Michele Tricca, Paolo Danesini, Alberto Rontini, Marco Lorenzi) 3:06.46 (silver) Russia (Evgeny Khokhlov, Radel Kashefrazov, Denis Nesmashnyy, Nikita Uglov) 3:07.47 (bronze) Germany (Königsmark, Lukas Schmitz, Lukas Hamich, Johannes Trefz) 3:08.56
  - Men's pole vault: (gold) Emile Denecker (FRA) 5.50m (silver) Kévin Ménaldo (FRA) 5.50m (bronze) Didac Salas (ESP) 5.40m
  - Men's triple jump: (gold) Alexander Yurchenko (RUS) 16.31m (silver) Murad Ibadullayev (AZE) 16.25m (bronze) Georgi Tsonov (BUL) 15.90m
  - Men's discus throw: (gold) Lukas Weisshaidinger (AUT) 63.83m (silver) Danijel Furtula (MNE) 63.54m (bronze) Benedikt Stienen (GER) 62.33m
  - Men's decathlon: (gold) Kevin Mayer (FRA) 8124 points (silver) Matthias Brugger (GER) 7853 (bronze) Johannes Hock (GER) 7806
  - Women's 1500m: (gold) Amela Terzic (SRB) 4:15.40 (silver) Ciara Mageean (IRL) 4:16.82 (bronze) Ioana Doaga (ROM) 4:20.73
  - Women's 5000m: (gold) Esma Aydemir (TUR) 16:12.16 (silver) Emelia Gorecka (GBR) 16:13.04 (bronze) Annabel Gummow (GBR) 16:14.62
  - Women's 400m hurdles: (gold) Vera Rudakova (RUS) 57.24 (silver) Aurélie Chaboudez (FRA) 57.35 (bronze) Maëva Contion (FRA) 58.03
  - Women's 4 × 100 m relay: (gold) Germany (Alexandra Burghardt, Katharina Grompe, Tatjana Lofamakanda Pinto, Anna-Lena Freese) 43.42 (silver) Italy (Oriana De Fazio, Irene Siragusa, Anna Bongiorni, Gloria Hooper) 44.52 (bronze) Great Britain (Marylyn Nwawulor, Bianca Williams, Jennie Batten, Jodie Williams) 45.00
  - Women's 4 × 400 m relay: (gold) Great Britain (Katie Kirk, Lucy James, Amelia Clifford, Kirsten Mcaslan) 3:35.29 (silver) Poland (Patrycja Wyciszkiewicz, Malgorzata Holub, Justyna Swiety, Magdalena Gorzkowska) 3:35.35 (bronze) Germany (Sabrina Häfele, Stefanie Gotzhein, Kim Carina Schmidt, Christina Zwirner) 3:36.26
  - Women's high jump: (gold) Mariya Kuchina (RUS) 1.95m (silver) Airinė Palšytė (LTU) 1.91m (bronze) Nadja Kampschulte (GER) 1.88m
  - Women's long jump: (gold) Lena Malkus (GER) 6.40m (silver) Alina Rotaru (ROM) 6.36m (bronze) Polina Yurchenko (RUS) 6.11m
  - Women's javelin throw: (gold) Liina Laasma (EST) 55.99m (silver) Līna Mūze (LAT) 55.83m (bronze) Laura Henkel (GER) 55.37m

==== Auto racing ====
- Formula One:
  - German Grand Prix in Nürburg, Germany: (1) Lewis Hamilton (GBR) (McLaren–Mercedes) (2) Fernando Alonso (ESP) (Ferrari) (3) Mark Webber (AUS) (Red Bull–Renault)
    - Drivers' championship standings (after 10 of 19 races): (1) Sebastian Vettel (GER) (Red Bull-Renault) 216 points (2) Webber 139 (3) Hamilton 134
- IndyCar Series:
  - Honda Indy Edmonton in Edmonton: (1) Will Power (AUS) (Team Penske) (2) Hélio Castroneves (BRA) (Team Penske) (3) Dario Franchitti (GBR) (Chip Ganassi Racing)
    - Drivers' championship standings (after 11 of 18 races): (1) Franchitti 388 points (2) Power 350 (3) Scott Dixon (NZL) (Chip Ganassi Racing) 282

==== Baseball ====
- Nippon Professional Baseball All-Star Series:
  - Game 3 in Sendai: Pacific League 5, Central League 0. **Pacific League win series 2–1.**
    - Hokkaido Nippon-Ham Fighters first baseman Atsunori Inaba is named game MVP with three hits and three RBIs.

==== Basketball ====
- FIBA Europe Under-20 Championship in Bilbao, Spain:
  - Bronze medal game: (bronze) **France** 66–50 Russia
  - Final: (silver) Italy 70–82 (gold) **Spain**
    - Spain win the title for the first time.

==== Cricket ====
- India in England:
  - 1st Test in London, day 4: England 474/8d & 269/6d (71 overs; Matt Prior 103*); India 286 & 80/1 (27 overs). India require another 378 runs with 9 wickets remaining.

==== Cycling ====
- Grand Tours:
  - Tour de France, Stage 21: (gold) Mark Cavendish (GBR) (HTC–Highroad) 2h 27' 02" (silver) Edvald Boasson Hagen (NOR) (Team Sky) s.t. (bronze) André Greipel (GER) (Omega Pharma–Lotto) s.t.
    - Cavendish wins the Champs-Élysées stage for the third straight year, further extending his record. His victory also secures the points classification for the first time.
    - Final general classification: (1) Cadel Evans (AUS) (BMC Racing Team) 86h 12' 22" (2) Andy Schleck (LUX) (Leopard Trek) + 1' 34" (3) Fränk Schleck (LUX) (Leopard Trek) + 2' 30"
      - Evans becomes the first Australian to win a Grand Tour.
    - UCI World Tour standings (after 17 of 27 races): (1) Evans 574 points (2) Alberto Contador (ESP) (Saxo Bank–SunGard) 471 (3) Philippe Gilbert (BEL) (Omega Pharma–Lotto) 402

==== Diving ====
- World Aquatics Championships in Shanghai, China:
  - Men's 10 m platform: (gold) Qiu Bo (CHN) 585.45 (silver) David Boudia (USA) 544.25 (bronze) Sascha Klein (GER) 534.50
    - China win all ten titles.
    - Qiu wins his second title of the championships.

==== Football (soccer) ====
- Copa América in Argentina:
  - Final in Buenos Aires: **Uruguay** 3–0 Paraguay
    - Uruguay win the title for a record 15th time.

==== Golf ====
- Senior majors:
  - The Senior Open Championship in Surrey, England:
    - Leaderboard after final round (all USA): (1) Russ Cochran 276 (−12) (2) Mark Calcavecchia 278 (−10) (T3) Corey Pavin & Tom Watson 279 (−9)
      - Cochran wins his first senior major title.
- PGA Tour:
  - RBC Canadian Open in Vancouver:
    - Winner: Sean O'Hair (USA) 276 (−4)^{PO}
      - O'Hair defeats Kris Blanks (USA) on the first playoff hole, to win his fourth PGA Tour title.
- European Tour:
  - Nordea Scandinavian Masters in Upplands-Bro, Sweden:
    - Winner: Alexander Norén (SWE) 273 (−15)
      - Norén wins his second title of the year, and third of his career.
- LPGA Tour:
  - Evian Masters in Évian-les-Bains, France:
    - Winner: Ai Miyazato (JPN) 273 (−15)
      - Miyazato wins her seventh LPGA Tour title.

==== Motorcycle racing ====
- Moto GP:
  - United States Grand Prix in Laguna Seca, United States:
    - MotoGP: (1) Casey Stoner (AUS) (Honda) (2) Jorge Lorenzo (ESP) (Yamaha) (3) Dani Pedrosa (ESP) (Honda)
      - Riders' championship standings (after 10 of 18 races): (1) Stoner 193 points (2) Lorenzo 173 (3) Andrea Dovizioso (ITA) (Honda) 143

==== Snooker ====
- Australian Goldfields Open in Bendigo, Australia:
  - Final: **Stuart Bingham** (ENG) 9–8 Mark Williams (WAL)
    - Bingham wins his first ranking title.

==== Surfing ====
- Men's World Tour:
  - Billabong Pro in Jeffreys Bay, South Africa: (1) Jordy Smith (RSA) (2) Mick Fanning (AUS) (3) Adrian Buchan (AUS) & Joel Parkinson (AUS)
    - Standings (after 4 of 11 events): (1) Parkinson 25,700 points (2) Smith 24,750 (3) Adriano De Souza (BRA) 22,250

==== Swimming ====
- World Aquatics Championships in Shanghai, China:
  - Men's 400m freestyle: (gold) Park Tae-Hwan (KOR) 3:42.04 (silver) Sun Yang (CHN) 3:43.24 (bronze) Paul Biedermann (GER) 3:44.14
    - Park wins the event for the second time.
  - Women's 400m freestyle: (gold) Federica Pellegrini (ITA) 4:01.97 (silver) Rebecca Adlington (GBR) 4:04.01 (bronze) Camille Muffat (FRA) 4:04.06
    - Pellegrini wins the event for the second time and her third world championships title.
  - Women's 4 × 100 m freestyle relay: (gold) Netherlands (Inge Dekker, Ranomi Kromowidjojo, Marleen Veldhuis, Femke Heemskerk) 3:33.96 (silver) United States (Natalie Coughlin, Missy Franklin, Jessica Hardy, Dana Vollmer) 3:34.47 (bronze) Germany (Britta Steffen, Silke Lippok, Lisa Vitting, Daniela Schreiber) 3:36.05
    - The Dutch quartet win the event for the second successive time.
  - Men's 4 × 100 m freestyle relay: (gold) Australia (James Magnussen, Matt Targett, Matthew Abood, Eamon Sullivan) 3:11.00 (silver) France (Alain Bernard, Jérémy Stravius, William Meynard, Fabien Gilot) 3:11.14 (bronze) United States (Michael Phelps, Garrett Weber-Gale, Jason Lezak, Nathan Adrian) 3:11.96
    - Sullivan wins his second world championship title.

==== Tennis ====
- ATP World Tour:
  - International German Open in Hamburg, Germany:
    - Final: **Gilles Simon** (FRA) def. Nicolás Almagro (ESP) 6–4, 4–6, 6–4
      - Simon wins his second title of the year, and the ninth of his career.
  - Atlanta Championships in Atlanta, United States:
    - Final: **Mardy Fish** (USA) def. John Isner (USA) 3–6, 7–6(6), 6–2
      - Fish defeats Isner in the final for the second consecutive year, to win his sixth ATP Tour title.
- WTA Tour:
  - Baku Cup in Baku, Azerbaijan:
    - Final: **Vera Zvonareva** (RUS) def. Ksenia Pervak (RUS) 6–1, 6–4
      - Zvonareva wins her second title of the year, and the twelfth of her career.

==== Water polo ====
- World Aquatics Championships in Shanghai, China:
  - Men's tournament:
    - Playoff round:
      - **Montenegro** 8–4 Romania
      - **Spain** 9–8 Australia
      - Canada 4–17 **United States**
      - Japan 6–8 **Germany**
    - Classification 13–16 Semifinals:
      - **Kazakhstan** 8–7 China
      - **Brazil** 7–4 South Africa

=== July 23, 2011 (Saturday) ===
==== Athletics ====
- European Junior Championships in Tallinn, Estonia:
  - Men's 200m: (gold) David Bolarinwa (GBR) 21.07 (silver) Pierre Vincent (FRA) 21.22 (bronze) Jeffrey John (FRA) 21.24
  - Men's 1500m: (gold) Adam Cotton (GBR) 3:43.98 (silver) Thomas Solberg Eide (NOR) 3:44.70 (bronze) Alexander Schwab (GER) 3:44.82
  - Men's 5000m: (gold) Gabriel Navarro (ESP) 14:07.06 (silver) Bartosz Kowalczyk (POL) 14:07.17 (bronze) Jonathan Hay (GBR) 14:07.78
  - Men's 110m hurdles: (gold) Jack Meredith (GBR) 13.50 (silver) Andy Pozzi (GBR) 13.57 (bronze) Rahib Mammadov (AZE) 13.78
  - Men's 10 km walk: (gold) Hagen Pohle (GER) 40:43.73 (silver) Ihor Lyashchenko (UKR) 41:10.43 (bronze) Luís Alberto Amezcua (ESP) 41:34.13
  - Men's high jump: (gold) Nikita Anishchenkov (RUS) 2.27m (silver) Janick Klausen (DEN) 2.25m (bronze) Gianmarco Tamberi (ITA) 2.25m
  - Men's javelin throw: (gold) Zigismunds Sirmais (LAT) 81.53m (silver) Marcin Krukowski (POL) 79.19m (bronze) Pavel Mialeshka (BLR) 76.59m
  - Women's 200m: (gold) Jodie Williams (GBR) 22.94 (silver) Jamile Samuel (NED) 23.31 (bronze) Jennifer Galais (FRA) 23.55
  - Women's 800m: (gold) Anastasiya Tkachuk (UKR) 2:02.73 (silver) Rowena Cole (GBR) 2:03.43 (bronze) Ayvika Malanova (RUS) 2:03.59
  - Women's 3000m: (gold) Amela Terzic (SRB) 9:17.61 (silver) Esma Aydemir (TUR) 9:19.61 (bronze) Lisa Jäsert (GER) 9:30.23
  - Women's 100m hurdles: (gold) Nooralotta Neziri (FIN) 13.34 (silver) Isabelle Pedersen (NOR) 13.37 (bronze) Ekaterina Bleskina (RUS) 13.47
  - Women's 3000m steeplechase: (gold) Gesa-Felicitas Krause (GER) 9:51.08 (silver) Gulshat Fazlitdinova (RUS) 9:56.98 (bronze) Elena Panaet (ROM) 10:17.37
  - Women's pole vault: (gold) Angelica Bengtsson (SWE) 4.57m (silver) Lilli Schnitzerling (GER) 4.20m (bronze) Natalia Demidenko (RUS) 4.20m
  - Women's shot put: (gold) Lena Urbaniak (GER) 16.31m (silver) Anna Wloka (POL) 16.23m (bronze) Anna Rüh (GER) 16.01m
  - Women's hammer throw: (gold) Barbara Špiler (SLO) 67.06m (silver) Kıvılcım Kaya (TUR) 66.74m (bronze) Alexia Sedykh (FRA) 65.02m

==== Auto racing ====
- Nationwide Series:
  - Federated Auto Parts 300 in Gladeville, Tennessee: (1) (Missouri) Carl Edwards (Ford; Roush Fenway Racing) (2) (Mississippi) Ricky Stenhouse Jr. (Ford; Roush Fenway Racing) (3) (North Carolina) Austin Dillon (Chevrolet; Kevin Harvick Incorporated)
    - Drivers' championship standings (after 20 of 34 races): (1) (Georgia (U.S. state)) Reed Sorenson (Chevrolet; Turner Motorsports) 702 points (2) Stenhouse Jr. 697 (3) (Virginia) Elliott Sadler (Chevrolet; Kevin Harvick Incorporated) 688

==== Baseball ====
- Nippon Professional Baseball All-Star Series:
  - Game 2 in Chiba: Pacific League 4, Central League 3. Series tied 1–1.
    - Saitama Seibu Lions third baseman Takeya Nakamura wins game MVP after hitting two home runs.

==== Basketball ====
- WNBA All-Star Game in San Antonio: Eastern Conference 118, Western Conference 113
  - The Eastern Conference win their first All-Star Game since 2007.

==== Cricket ====
- India in England:
  - 1st Test in London, day 3: England 474/8d & 5/0 (5 overs); India 286 (95.5 overs; Rahul Dravid 103*). England lead by 193 runs with 10 wickets remaining.

==== Cycling ====
- Grand Tours:
  - Tour de France, Stage 20: (gold) Tony Martin (GER) (HTC–Highroad) 55' 33" (silver) Cadel Evans (AUS) (BMC Racing Team) + 7" (bronze) Alberto Contador (ESP) (Saxo Bank–SunGard) + 1' 06"
    - General classification (after stage 20): (1) Evans 83h 45' 20" (2) Andy Schleck (LUX) (Leopard Trek) + 1' 34" (3) Fränk Schleck (LUX) (Leopard Trek) + 2' 30"

==== Diving ====
- World Aquatics Championships in Shanghai, China:
  - Women's 3 m springboard: (gold) Wu Minxia (CHN) 380.85 points (silver) He Zi (CHN) 379.15 (bronze) Jennifer Abel (CAN) 365.10
    - Wu wins her second title of the championships and her sixth world title overall.

==== Equestrianism ====
- Show jumping – Global Champions Tour:
  - 7th Competition in Chantilly, Oise (CSI 5*): (gold) Edwina Alexander (AUS) on Itot du Château (silver) Luciana Diniz (POR) on Lennox (bronze) Pénélope Leprevost (FRA) on Mylord Carthago
    - Standings (after 7 of 10 competitions): (1) Alexander 195 points (2) Ludger Beerbaum (GER) 186.5 (3) Diniz 186

==== Football (soccer) ====
- 2014 FIFA World Cup qualification (AFC), Second round, first leg:
  - Thailand 1–0 Palestine
  - Lebanon 4–0 Bangladesh
  - China 7–2 Laos
  - Turkmenistan 1–1 Indonesia
  - Kuwait 3–0 Philippines
  - Oman 2–0 Myanmar
  - Saudi Arabia 3–0 Hong Kong
  - Iran 4–0 Maldives
  - Syria 2–1 Tajikistan in Amman, Jordan
  - Qatar 3–0 Vietnam
  - Iraq 2–0 Yemen
  - Singapore 5–3 Malaysia
  - Uzbekistan 4–0 Kyrgyzstan
  - United Arab Emirates 3–0 India
  - Jordan 9–0 Nepal
- Copa América in Argentina:
  - Third-place match in La Plata: (bronze) **Peru** 4–1 Venezuela
- UEFA European Under-19 Championship in Romania (team in **bold** advances to semifinals):
  - Group A:
    - Czech Republic 2–1 Republic of Ireland in Mogoşoaia
    - Romania 0–1 Greece in Berceni
      - Standings (after 2 matches): Czech Republic 6 points, Republic of Ireland, Greece 3, Romania 0.
  - Group B:
    - Turkey 1–1 Belgium in Buftea
    - Serbia 0–4 **Spain** in Chiajna
      - Standings (after 2 matches): Spain 6 points, Serbia 3, Turkey, Belgium 1.
- (Germany) DFL-Supercup in Gelsenkirchen: Borussia Dortmund 0–0 (3–4 pen.) **FC Schalke 04**
  - Schalke win the Cup for the first time.

==== Golf ====
- Senior majors:
  - The Senior Open Championship in Surrey, England:
    - Leaderboard after third round: (T1) Mark Calcavecchia (USA), Russ Cochran (USA) & David Frost (RSA) 209 (−7)

==== Open water swimming ====
- World Aquatics Championships in Shanghai, China:
  - Men's 25 km: (gold) Petar Stoychev (BUL) 5:10:39.8 (silver) Vladimir Dyatchin (RUS) 5:11:15.6 (bronze) Csaba Gercsák (HUN) 5:11:18.1
  - Women's 25 km: (gold) Ana Marcela Cunha (BRA) 5:29:22.9 (silver) Angela Maurer (GER) 5:29:25.0 (bronze) Alice Franco (ITA) 5:29:30.8

==== Rugby union ====
- Tri Nations Series:
  - Australia 39–20 South Africa in Sydney

==== Snooker ====
- Australian Goldfields Open in Bendigo, Australia, semi-finals:
  - Shaun Murphy (ENG) 2–6 **Stuart Bingham** (ENG)
    - Bingham reaches his first ranking final.
  - Ken Doherty (IRL) 2–6 **Mark Williams** (WAL)

==== Synchronized swimming ====
- World Aquatics Championships in Shanghai, China:
  - Team free routine: (gold) Russia (Anastasia Davydova, Natalia Ishchenko, Elvira Khasyanova, Svetlana Kolesnichenko, Daria Korobova, Aleksandra Patskevich, Alla Shishkina, Angelika Timanina) 98.620 points (silver) China (Chang Si, Fan Jiachen, Huang Xuechen, Jiang Tingting, Jiang Wenwen, Liu Ou, Luo Xi, Wu Yiwen) 96.580 (bronze) Spain (Clara Basiana, Alba María Cabello, Ona Carbonell, Margalida Crespí, Andrea Fuentes, Thaïs Henríquez, Paula Klamburg, Irene Montrucchio) 96.150
    - Russia win all seven events contested.
    - Ishchenko wins her sixth title of the championships and 15th world title overall.
    - Khasyanova wins her third title of the championships and eighth world title overall.
    - Davydova wins her third title of the championships and fifth world title overall.
    - Kolesnichenko, Korobova, Patskevich, Shishkina and Timanina win their third title of the championships.

==== Water polo ====
- World Aquatics Championships in Shanghai, China:
  - Women's tournament:
    - Playoff round:
      - **Netherlands** 14–6 New Zealand
      - Hungary 9–10 **Australia**
      - **Russia** 26–4 Cuba
      - Spain 6–15 **China**
    - Classification 13–16 Semifinals:
      - **Kazakhstan** 14–13 Uzbekistan
      - **Brazil** 10–9 South Africa

=== July 22, 2011 (Friday) ===
==== Athletics ====
- Samsung Diamond League:
  - Herculis in Fontvieille, Monaco:
    - Men:
      - 100m: Usain Bolt (JAM) 9.88
      - 800m: David Rudisha (KEN) 1:42.61
      - 1500m: Silas Kiplagat (KEN) 3:30.47
      - 5000m: Mo Farah (GBR) 12:53.11
      - 400m hurdles: Angelo Taylor (USA) 47.97
      - 3000m steeplechase: Brimin Kipruto (KEN) 7:53.64
      - Triple jump: Phillips Idowu (GBR) 17.36m
      - Pole vault: Renaud Lavillenie (FRA) 5.90m
      - Shot put: Reese Hoffa (USA) 21.25m
    - Women:
      - 200m: Carmelita Jeter (USA) 22.20
      - 400m: Amantle Montsho (BOT) 49.71
      - 1500m: Maryam Yusuf Jamal (BHR) 4:00.59
      - 100m hurdles: Sally Pearson (AUS) 12.51
      - Long jump: Brittney Reese (USA) 6.82m
      - High jump: Blanka Vlašić (CRO) 1.97m
      - Discus throw: Nadine Müller (GER) 65.90m
      - Javelin throw: Barbora Špotáková (CZE) 69.45m
- European Junior Championships in Tallinn, Estonia:
  - Men's 100m: (gold) Jimmy Vicaut (FRA) 10.07 (silver) Adam Gemili (GBR) 10.41 (bronze) David Bolarinwa (GBR) 10.46
  - Men's 400m: (gold) Marcell Deák-Nagy (HUN) 45.42 (silver) Nikita Uglov (RUS) 46.01 (bronze) Michele Tricca (ITA) 46.09
  - Men's long jump: (gold) Sergey Morgunov (RUS) 8.18m (silver) Tomasz Jaszczuk (POL) 8.11m (bronze) Evgeny Antonov (RUS) 7.83m
  - Men's hammer throw: (gold) Quentin Bigot (FRA) 78.45m (silver) Serghei Marghiev (MDA) 76.60m (bronze) Elias Håkansson (SWE) 74.99m
  - Women's 100m: (gold) Jodie Williams (GBR) 11.18 (silver) Jamile Samuel (NED) 11.43 (bronze) Tatjana Lofamakanda Pinto (GER) 11.48
  - Women's 400m: (gold) Bianca Răzor (ROM) 51.96 (silver) Yulia Yurenya (BLR) 53.03 (bronze) Madiea Ghafoor (NED) 53.73
  - Women's triple jump: (gold) Yana Borodina (RUS) 14.00m (silver) Kristiina Mäkelä (FIN) 13.67m (bronze) Ganna Aleksandrova (UKR) 13.14m
  - Women's discus throw: (gold) Shanice Craft (GER) 58.65m (silver) Anna Rüh (GER) 58.10m (bronze) Viktoriya Klochko (UKR) 54.03m
  - Women's heptathlon: (gold) Dafne Schippers (NED) 6153 points (silver) Sara Gambetta (GER) 6108 (bronze) Laura Ikauniece (LAT) 6063

==== Baseball ====
- Nippon Professional Baseball All-Star Series:
  - Game 1 in Nagoya: Central League 9, Pacific League 4. Central League lead series 1–0.
    - Tokyo Yakult Swallows first baseman Kazuhiro Hatakeyama is named game MVP after hitting a game-winning three-run home run in the 5th inning.

==== Cricket ====
- India in England:
  - 1st Test in London, day 2: England 474/8d (131.4 overs; Kevin Pietersen 202*, Praveen Kumar 5/106); India 17/0 (6 overs). India trail by 457 runs with 10 wickets remaining in the 1st innings.

==== Cycling ====
- Grand Tours:
  - Tour de France, Stage 19: (gold) Pierre Rolland (FRA) (Team Europcar) 3h 13' 25" (silver) Samuel Sánchez (ESP) (Euskaltel–Euskadi) + 14" (bronze) Alberto Contador (ESP) (Saxo Bank–SunGard) + 23"
    - General classification (after stage 19): (1) Andy Schleck (LUX) (Leopard Trek) 82h 48' 43" (2) Fränk Schleck (LUX) (Leopard Trek) + 53" (3) Cadel Evans (AUS) (BMC Racing Team) + 57"

==== Diving ====
- World Aquatics Championships in Shanghai, China:
  - Men's 3 m springboard: (gold) He Chong (CHN) 554.30 (silver) Ilya Zakharov (RUS) 508.95 (bronze) Evgeny Kuznetsov (RUS) 493.55
    - He wins the event for the second successive time, and third world title overall.

==== Golf ====
- Senior majors:
  - The Senior Open Championship in Surrey, England:
    - Leaderboard after second round: (T1) Mark Calcavecchia (USA), Lee Rinker (USA) & Rod Spittle (CAN) 137 (−7)

==== Open water swimming ====
- World Aquatics Championships in Shanghai, China:
  - Men's 5 km: (gold) Thomas Lurz (GER) 56:16.2 (silver) Spyridon Gianniotis (GRE) 56:17.4 (bronze) Evgeny Drattsev (RUS) 56:18.5
    - Lurz wins the event for the fourth successive time, and fifth world title overall.
  - Women's 5 km: (gold) Swann Oberson (SUI) 1:00:39.7 (silver) Aurélie Muller (FRA) 1:00:40.1 (bronze) Ashley Twichell (USA) 1:00:40.2
    - Switzerland wins its first ever gold medal at a World Aquatics Championships.

==== Snooker ====
- Australian Goldfields Open in Bendigo, Australia, quarter-finals:
  - Matthew Selt (ENG) 3–5 **Shaun Murphy** (ENG)
  - Mark Allen (NIR) 3–5 **Stuart Bingham** (ENG)
  - Mark Selby (ENG) 3–5 **Ken Doherty** (IRL)
  - Dominic Dale (WAL) 4–5 **Mark Williams** (WAL)

==== Synchronized swimming ====
- World Aquatics Championships in Shanghai, China:
  - Duet free routine: (gold) Natalia Ishchenko/Svetlana Romashina (RUS) 98.200 points (silver) Jiang Tingting/Jiang Wenwen (CHN) 96.810 (bronze) Ona Carbonell/Andrea Fuentes (ESP) 96.500
    - Ishchenko wins the event for the second successive time, and her fifth title of the championships and 14th world title overall.
    - Romashina wins the event for the second successive time, and her third title of the championships and 10th world title overall.

==== Water polo ====
- World Aquatics Championships in Shanghai, China (teams in **bold** advance to quarterfinals, teams in italic advance to playoff round):
  - Men's tournament:
    - Group A:
      - **Hungary** 12–11 Spain
      - Kazakhstan 5–16 Montenegro
        - Final standings: Hungary 6 points, Montenegro 4, Spain 2, Kazakhstan 0.
    - Group B:
      - **Serbia** 12–9 Australia
      - Romania 14–10 China
        - Final standings: Serbia 6 points, Australia 4, Romania 2, China 0.
    - Group C:
      - Brazil 9–13 Canada
      - Japan 7–18 **Croatia**
        - Final standings: Croatia 6 points, Canada 4, Japan 2, Brazil 0.
    - Group D:
      - United States 20–3 South Africa
      - **Italy** 7–6 Germany
        - Final standings: Italy 6 points, Germany 4, United States 2, South Africa 0.

=== July 21, 2011 (Thursday) ===
==== Athletics ====
- European Junior Championships in Tallinn, Estonia:
  - Men's 10,000m: (gold) Gabriel Navarro (ESP) 30:02.18 (silver) Emmanuel Lejeune (BEL) 31:35.19 (bronze) Szymon Kulka (POL) 31:50.13
  - Men's shot put: (gold) Krzysztof Brzozowski (POL) 20.92m (silver) Daniele Secci (ITA) 20.45m (bronze) Christian Jagusch (GER) 19.80m
  - Women's 10 km walk (all RUS): (gold) Elena Lashmanova 42:59.48 (WJR) (silver) Svetlana Vasileva 44:52.98 (bronze) Anna Ermin 46:49.00

==== Cricket ====
- India in England:
  - 1st Test in London, day 1: England 127/2 (49.2 overs); India.

==== Cycling ====
- Grand Tours:
  - Tour de France, Stage 18: (gold) Andy Schleck (LUX) (Leopard Trek) 6h 07' 56" (silver) Fränk Schleck (LUX) (Leopard Trek) + 2' 07" (bronze) Cadel Evans (AUS) (BMC Racing Team) + 2' 15"
    - General classification (after stage 18): (1) Thomas Voeckler (FRA) (Team Europcar) 79h 34' 06" (2) Andy Schleck + 15" (3) Fränk Schleck + 1' 08"

==== Diving ====
- World Aquatics Championships in Shanghai, China:
  - Women's 10 m platform: (gold) Chen Ruolin (CHN) 405.30 (silver) Hu Yadan (CHN) 394.00 (bronze) Paola Espinosa (MEX) 377.15
    - Chen wins her second title of the championships and fourth world title overall.

==== Football (soccer) ====
- UEFA European Under-19 Championship in Romania:
  - Group B: Spain 4–1 Belgium in Mogoşoaia
- UEFA Europa League Second qualifying round, second leg (first leg scores in parentheses):
  - Irtysh Pavlodar (Kazakhstan) 0–2 (1–1) (Georgia (country)) **Metalurgist Rustavi**. Metalurgist Rustavi win 3–1 on aggregate.
  - Mika (Armenia) 0–1 (0–1) (Norway) **Vålerenga**. Vålerenga win 2–0 on aggregate.
  - **Gaz Metan Mediaș** (Romania) 2–0 (0–1) (Finland) KuPS. Gaz Metan Mediaș win 2–1 on aggregate.
  - Vojvodina (Serbia) 1–3 (2–0) (Liechtenstein) **Vaduz**. 3–3 on aggregate; Vaduz win on away goals.
  - **Ventspils** (Latvia) 3–2 (1–0) (Belarus) Shakhtyor Soligorsk. Ventspils win 4–2 on aggregate.
  - Khazar Lankaran (Azerbaijan) 0–0 (1–3) (Israel) **Maccabi Tel Aviv**. Maccabi Tel Aviv win 3–1 on aggregate.
  - Levadia Tallinn (Estonia) 0–1 (0–0) (Luxembourg) **Differdange 03**. Differdange 03 win 1–0 on aggregate.
  - **Elfsborg** (Sweden) 3–0 (1–1) (Lithuania) Sūduva Marijampolė. Elfsborg win 4–1 on aggregate.
  - Sheriff Tiraspol (Moldova) 0–0 (0–1) (Bosnia and Herzegovina) **Željezničar**. Željezničar win 1–0 on aggregate.
  - **Aktobe** (Kazakhstan) 0–0 (1–1) (Hungary) Kecskemét. 1–1 on aggregate; Aktobe win on away goals.
  - Honka (Finland) 0–2 (0–1) (Sweden) **Häcken**. Häcken win 3–0 on aggregate.
  - **Qarabağ** (Azerbaijan) 0–0 (1–1) (Faroe Islands) EB/Streymur. 1–1 on aggregate; Qarabağ win on away goals.
  - **Bnei Yehuda** (Israel) 2–0 (2–0) (Andorra) Sant Julià. Bnei Yehuda win 4–0 on aggregate.
  - **Varaždin** (Croatia) 3–1 (1–1) (Moldova) Iskra-Stal. Varaždin win 4–2 on aggregate.
  - **Vorskla Poltava** (Ukraine) 3–0 (2–0) (Northern Ireland) Glentoran. Vorskla Poltava win 5–0 on aggregate.
  - **Sarajevo** (Bosnia and Herzegovina) 2–0 (0–0) (Sweden) Örebro. Sarajevo win 2–0 on aggregate.
  - **Dinamo Tbilisi** (Georgia (country)) 5–0 (1–2) (Wales) Llanelli. Dinamo Tbilisi win 6–2 on aggregate.
  - **AEK Larnaca** (Cyprus) 1–0 (8–0) (Malta) Floriana. AEK Larnaca win 9–0 on aggregate.
  - **Spartak Trnava** (Slovakia) 3–1 (0–0) (Albania) Tirana. Spartak Trnava win 3–1 on aggregate.
  - **Aalesund** (Norway) 3–1 (a.e.t.) (1–2) (Hungary) Ferencváros. Aalesund win 4–3 on aggregate.
  - **Red Bull Salzburg** (Austria) 0–0 (4–1) (Latvia) Liepājas Metalurgs. Red Bull Salzburg win 4–1 on aggregate.
  - Gagra (Georgia (country)) 2–0 (0–3) (Cyprus) **Anorthosis**. Anorthosis win 3–2 on aggregate.
  - Tromsø (Norway) 0–3 (1–1) (Hungary) **Paks**. Paks win 4–1 on aggregate.
  - **Midtjylland** (Denmark) 5–2 (3–1) (Wales) The New Saints. Midtjylland win 8–3 on aggregate.
  - **Lokomotiv Sofia** (Bulgaria) 3–2 (0–0) (North Macedonia) Metalurg Skopje. Lokomotiv Sofia win 3–2 on aggregate.
  - Žilina (Slovakia) 2–0 (0–3) (Iceland) **KR Reykjavík**. KR Reykjavík win 3–2 on aggregate.
  - **Thun** (Switzerland) 2–1 (0–0) (Albania) Vllaznia Shkodër. Thun win 2–1 on aggregate.
  - **Gaziantepspor** (Turkey) 4–1 (1–1) (Belarus) Minsk. Gaziantepspor win 5–2 on aggregate.
  - **ADO Den Haag** (Netherlands) 2–0 (3–2) (Lithuania) Tauras Tauragė. ADO Den Haag win 5–2 on aggregate.
  - **Rabotnički** (North Macedonia) 3–0 (1–0) (San Marino) Juvenes/Dogana. Rabotnički win 4–0 on aggregate.
  - **Jablonec** (Czech Republic) 5–1 (2–0) (Albania) Flamurtari Vlorë. Jablonec win 7–1 on aggregate.
  - **Olympiacos Volos** (Greece) 1–1 (1–0) (Serbia) Rad. Olympiakos Volou win 2–1 on aggregate.
  - **Westerlo** (Belgium) 0–0 (1–0) (Finland) TPS. Westerlo win 1–0 on aggregate.
  - **Fulham** (England) 4–0 (3–1) (Northern Ireland) Crusaders. Fulham win 7–1 on aggregate.
  - **Split** (Croatia) 3–1 (2–1) (Slovenia) Domžale. Split win 5–2 on aggregate.
  - Bohemians (Republic of Ireland) 1–1 (0–2) (Slovenia) **Olimpija Ljubljana**. Olimpija Ljubljana win 3–1 on aggregate.
  - Dundee United (Scotland) 3–2 (0–1) (Poland) **Śląsk Wrocław**. 3–3 on aggregate, Śląsk Wrocław win on away goals.
  - **St Patrick's Athletic** (Republic of Ireland) 2–0 (1–2) (Kazakhstan) Shakhter Karagandy. St Patrick's Athletic win 3–2 on aggregate.
  - **Nacional** (Portugal) 2–0 (1–1) (Iceland) FH. Nacional win 3–1 on aggregate.
  - **Austria Wien** 2–0 (3–0) (Montenegro) Rudar Pljevlja. Austria Wien win 5–0 on aggregate.

==== Golf ====
- Senior majors:
  - The Senior Open Championship in Surrey, England:
    - Leaderboard after first round: (T1) Mark Calcavecchia (USA), Mike Harwood (AUS) & Mark McNulty (IRL) 68 (−4)

==== Open water swimming ====
- World Aquatics Championships in Shanghai, China:
  - Team: (gold) Andrew Gemmell, Ashley Twichell, Sean Ryan (USA) 57:00.6 (silver) Melissa Gorman, Ky Hurst, Rhys Mainstone (AUS) 57:01.8 (bronze) Isabelle Härle, Thomas Lurz, Jan Wolfgarten (GER) 57:44.2

==== Snooker ====
- Australian Goldfields Open in Bendigo, Australia, Last 16:
  - David Gilbert (ENG) 2–5 **Mark Williams** (WAL)
  - Marcus Campbell (SCO) 1–5 **Mark Allen** (NIR)
  - **Mark Selby** (ENG) 5–3 Mark Davis (ENG)
  - Tom Ford (ENG) 0–5 **Stuart Bingham** (ENG)
  - Neil Robertson (AUS) 4–5 **Dominic Dale** (WAL)
  - Liang Wenbo (CHN) 4–5 **Ken Doherty** (IRL)

==== Synchronized swimming ====
- World Aquatics Championships in Shanghai, China:
  - Free routine combination: (gold) Russia (Anastasia Davydova, Mariya Gromova, Natalia Ishchenko, Elvira Khasyanova, Svetlana Kolesnichenko, Daria Korobova, Aleksandra Patskevich, Svetlana Romashina, Alla Shishkina, Angelika Timanina) 98.470 (silver) China (Chang Si, Chen Xiaojun, Fan Jiachen, Guo Li, Huang Xuechen, Liu Ou, Luo Xi, Sun Wenyan, Wu Yiwen, Yu Lele) 96.390 (bronze) Canada (Genevieve Belanger, Marie-Pier Boudreau Gagnon, Stéphanie Durocher, Jo-Annie Fortin, Chloé Isaac, Stéphanie Leclair, Tracy Little, Élise Marcotte, Karine Thomas, Valerie Welsh) 96.150
    - Ishchenko wins her fourth title of the championships and 13th world title overall.
    - Romashina wins her second title of the championships and ninth world title overall.
    - Khasyanova wins her second title of the championships and eighth world title overall.
    - Davydova wins her second title of the championships and fourth world title overall.
    - Gromova, Kolesnichenko, Korobova, Patskevich, Shishkina and Timanina win their second title of the championships.

==== Water polo ====
- World Aquatics Championships in Shanghai, China (teams in **bold** advance to quarterfinals, teams in italic advance to playoff round):
  - Women's tournament:
    - Group A:
      - Netherlands 9–9 Hungary
      - Kazakhstan 4–14 **United States**
        - Final standings: United States 5 points, Netherlands 4, Hungary 3, Kazakhstan 0.
    - Group B:
      - Australia 27–2 Uzbekistan
      - New Zealand 4–11 **Canada**
        - Final standings: Canada 6 points, Australia 4, New Zealand 2, Uzbekistan 0.
    - Group C:
      - Brazil 4–12 Spain
      - **Greece** 6–5 Russia
        - Final standings: Greece 6 points, Russia 4, Spain 2, Brazil 0.
    - Group D:
      - South Africa 9–9 Cuba
      - **Italy** 10–9 China
        - Final standings: Italy 6 points, China 4, Cuba, South Africa 1.

=== July 20, 2011 (Wednesday) ===
==== Cycling ====
- Grand Tours:
  - Tour de France, Stage 17: (gold) Edvald Boasson Hagen (NOR) (Team Sky) 4h 18' 00" (silver) Bauke Mollema (NED) (Rabobank) + 40" (bronze) Sandy Casar (FRA) (FDJ) + 50"
    - General classification (after stage 17): (1) Thomas Voeckler (FRA) (Team Europcar) 73h 23' 49" (2) Cadel Evans (AUS) (BMC Racing Team) + 1' 18" (3) Fränk Schleck (LUX) (Leopard Trek) + 1' 22"

==== Football (soccer) ====
- Copa América in Argentina:
  - Semifinals in Mendoza: **Paraguay** 0–0 (5–3 pen.) Venezuela
    - Paraguay reach the final for the first time since 1979.
- UEFA European Under-19 Championship in Romania:
  - Group A:
    - Greece 1–2 Republic of Ireland in Buftea
    - Romania 1–3 Czech Republic in Chiajna
  - Group B:
    - Serbia 2–0 Turkey in Berceni
    - Spain 1–0 Belgium in Mogoşoaia — match abandoned after 15 minutes; rescheduled for 21 July.
- UEFA Champions League Second qualifying round, second leg (first leg scores in parentheses):
  - **APOEL** (Cyprus) 4–0 (2–0) (Albania) Skënderbeu Korçë. APOEL win 6–0 on aggregate.
  - Dacia Chişinău (Moldova) 2–0 (0–3) (Georgia (country)) **Zestaponi**. Zestaponi win 3–2 on aggregate.
  - Videoton (Hungary) 3–2 (0–2) (Austria) **Sturm Graz**. Sturm Graz win 4–3 on aggregate.
  - Borac Banja Luka (Bosnia and Herzegovina) 3–2 (1–5) (Israel) **Maccabi Haifa**. Maccabi Haifa win 7–4 on aggregate.
  - Breiðablik (Iceland) 2–0 (0–5) (Norway) **Rosenborg**. Rosenborg win 5–2 on aggregate.

==== Golf ====
- The LPGA announces that the Evian Masters will become that tour's fifth major championship effective in 2013. The event, already a Ladies European Tour major, will be renamed the Evian Championship when it becomes an LPGA major.

==== Open water swimming ====
- World Aquatics Championships in Shanghai, China:
  - Men's 10 km: (gold) Spyridon Gianniotis (GRE) 1:54:24.7 (silver) Thomas Lurz (GER) 1:54:27.2 (bronze) Sergey Bolshakov (RUS) 1:54:31.8

==== Snooker ====
- Australian Goldfields Open in Bendigo, Australia:
  - Last 32:
    - Stephen Maguire (SCO) 2–5 **Ken Doherty** (IRL)
    - **Mark Williams** (WAL) 5–2 Barry Pinches (ENG)
    - **Mark Selby** (ENG) 5–3 Joe Perry (ENG)
    - Matthew Stevens (WAL) 4–5 **Liang Wenbo** (CHN)
    - Ding Junhui (CHN) 2–5 **Stuart Bingham** (ENG)
  - Last 16: **Matthew Selt** (ENG) 5–1 Stephen Hendry (SCO)

==== Synchronized swimming ====
- World Aquatics Championships in Shanghai, China:
  - Solo free routine: (gold) Natalia Ishchenko (RUS) 98.550 points (silver) Andrea Fuentes (ESP) 96.520 (bronze) Sun Wenyan (CHN) 95.840
    - Ishchenko wins the event for the second successive time, and her third title of the championships and 12th world title overall.

==== Water polo ====
- World Aquatics Championships in Shanghai, China:
  - Men's tournament:
    - Group A:
      - Spain 7–9 Montenegro
      - Hungary 16–5 Kazakhstan
        - Standings (after 2 games): Hungary 4 points, Spain, Montenegro 2, Kazakhstan 0.
    - Group B:
      - Serbia 12–5 Romania
      - Australia 12–7 China
        - Standings (after 2 games): Serbia, Australia 4 points, Romania, China 0.
    - Group C:
      - Canada 4–11 Croatia
      - Brazil 11–13 Japan
        - Standings (after 2 games): Croatia 4 points, Canada, Japan 2, Brazil 0.
    - Group D:
      - South Africa 8–16 Germany
      - United States 5–8 Italy
        - Standings (after 2 games): Italy, Germany 4 points, United States, South Africa 0.

=== July 19, 2011 (Tuesday) ===
==== Cycling ====
- Grand Tours:
  - Tour de France, Stage 16: (gold) Thor Hushovd (NOR) (Garmin–Cervélo) 3h 31' 38" (silver) Edvald Boasson Hagen (NOR) (Team Sky) s.t. (bronze) Ryder Hesjedal (CAN) (Garmin–Cervélo) + 2"
    - General classification (after stage 16): (1) Thomas Voeckler (FRA) (Team Europcar) 69h 00' 56" (2) Cadel Evans (AUS) (BMC Racing Team) + 1' 45" (3) Fränk Schleck (LUX) (Leopard Trek) + 1' 49"

==== Diving ====
- World Aquatics Championships in Shanghai, China:
  - Women's 1 m springboard: (gold) Shi Tingmao (CHN) 318.65 points (silver) Wang Han (CHN) 310.20 (bronze) Tania Cagnotto (ITA) 295.45
  - Men's 3 m synchro springboard: (gold) Qin Kai / Luo Yutong (CHN) 463.98 points (silver) Ilya Zakharov / Evgeny Kuznetsov (RUS) 451.89 (bronze) Yahel Castillo / Julián Sánchez (MEX) 437.61
    - Qin wins the event for the third successive time and his fifth world championship title.
    - Luo wins his second world championship title.

==== Fencing ====
- European Championships in Sheffield, United Kingdom:
  - Men's sabre team: (gold) Italy (Aldo Montano, Diego Occhuizzi, Gianpiero Pastore, Luigi Tarantino) (silver) Germany (Max Hartung, Björn Hübner, Nicolas Limbach, Benedikt Wagner) (bronze) Russia (Pavel Bykov, Nikolay Kovalev, Veniamin Reshetnikov, Aleksey Yakimenko)
  - Women's épée team: (gold) Romania (Simona Alexandru, Ana Maria Brânză, Loredana Iordăchioiu, Anca Măroiu) (silver) Russia (Violetta Kolobova, Tatiana Logunova, Lyubov Shutova, Anna Sivkova) (bronze) France (Sarah Daninthe, Laura Flessel-Colovic, Joséphine Jacques-André-Coquin, Maureen Nisima)

==== Football (soccer) ====
- Copa América in Argentina:
  - Semifinals in La Plata: Peru 0–2 **Uruguay**
    - Uruguay reach the final for the first time since 1999.
- UEFA Champions League Second qualifying round, second leg (first leg scores in parentheses):
  - Flora Tallinn (Estonia) 0–0 (0–1) (Republic of Ireland) **Shamrock Rovers**. Shamrock Rovers win 1–0 on aggregate.
  - F91 Dudelange (Luxembourg) 1–3 (0–2) (Slovenia) **Maribor**. Maribor win 5–1 on aggregate.
  - Tobol Kostanay (Kazakhstan) 1–1 (0–2) (Slovakia) **Slovan Bratislava**. Slovan Bratislava win 3–1 on aggregate.
  - Neftchi Baku (Azerbaijan) 0–0 (0–3) (Croatia) **Dinamo Zagreb**. Dinamo Zagreb win 3–0 on aggregate.
  - **Ekranas** (Lithuania) 1–0 (3–2) (Malta) Valletta. Ekranas win 4–2 on aggregate.
  - **HJK Helsinki** (Finland) 10–0 (3–0) (Wales) Bangor City. HJK Helsinki win 13–0 on aggregate.
  - **BATE Borisov** (Belarus) 2–0 (1–1) (Northern Ireland) Linfield. BATE Borisov win 3–1 on aggregate.
  - **Litex Lovech** (Bulgaria) 3–0 (2–1) (Montenegro) Mogren. Litex Lovech win 5–1 on aggregate.
  - HB Tórshavn (Faroe Islands) 1–1 (0–2) (Sweden) **Malmö FF**. Malmö FF win 3–1 on aggregate.
  - **Viktoria Plzeň** (Czech Republic) 5–1 (4–0) (Armenia) Pyunik. Viktoria Plzeň win 9–1 on aggregate.
  - **Wisła Kraków** (Poland) 2–0 (1–0) (Latvia) Skonto. Wisła Kraków win 3–0 on aggregate.
  - Škendija (North Macedonia) 0–1 (0–4) (Serbia) **Partizan**. Partizan win 5–0 on aggregate.

==== Open water swimming ====
- World Aquatics Championships in Shanghai, China:
  - Women's 10 km: (gold) Keri-anne Payne (GBR) 2:01:58.1 (silver) Martina Grimaldi (ITA) 2:01:59.9 (bronze) Marianna Lymperta (GRE) 2:02:01.8
    - Payne wins the title for the second successive time.

==== Snooker ====
- Australian Goldfields Open in Bendigo, Australia:
  - Last 32:
    - **Dominic Dale** (WAL) 5–2 Steve Mifsud (AUS)
    - John Higgins (SCO) 4–5 **Matthew Selt** (ENG)
    - Ali Carter (ENG) 3–5 **Marcus Campbell** (SCO)
    - **Neil Robertson** (AUS) 5–2 Nigel Bond (ENG)
    - **Mark Allen** (NIR) 5–3 Ryan Day (WAL)
  - Last 16: Rory McLeod (ENG) 1–5 **Shaun Murphy** (ENG)

==== Synchronized swimming ====
- World Aquatics Championships in Shanghai, China:
  - Team technical routine: (gold) Russia (Anastasia Davydova, Mariya Gromova, Elvira Khasyanova, Svetlana Kolesnichenko, Daria Korobova, Aleksandra Patskevich, Alla Shishkina, Angelika Timanina) 98.300 points (silver) China (Chang Si, Huang Xuechen, Jiang Tingting, Jiang Wenwen, Liu Ou, Luo Xi, Sun Wenyan, Wu Yiwen) 96.800 (bronze) Spain (Clara Basiana, Alba María Cabello, Ona Carbonell, Margalida Crespí, Andrea Fuentes, Thaïs Henríquez, Paula Klamburg, Cristina Salvador) 96.000

==== Water polo ====
- World Aquatics Championships in Shanghai, China:
  - Women's tournament:
    - Group A:
      - Hungary 7–16 United States
      - Netherlands 13–3 Kazakhstan
        - Standings (after 2 games): Netherlands, United States 3 points, Hungary 2, Kazakhstan 0.
    - Group B:
      - Uzbekistan 6–22 Canada
      - Australia 12–4 New Zealand
        - Standings (after 2 games): Canada 4 points, Australia, New Zealand 2, Uzbekistan 0.
    - Group C:
      - Spain 8–18 Russia
      - Brazil 8–11 Greece
        - Standings (after 2 games): Russia, Greece 4 points, Spain, Brazil 0.
    - Group D:
      - Italy 18–2 South Africa
      - China 19–6 Cuba
        - Standings (after 2 games): China, Italy 4 points, Cuba, South Africa 0.

=== July 18, 2011 (Monday) ===
==== Diving ====
- World Aquatics Championships in Shanghai, China:
  - Men's 1 m springboard: (gold) Li Shixin (CHN) 463.90 points (silver) He Min (CHN) 444.00 (bronze) Pavlo Rozenberg (GER) 436.50
  - Women's 10 m synchro platform: (gold) Wang Hao/Chen Ruolin (CHN) 362.58 points (silver) Alex Croak/Melissa Wu (AUS) 325.92 (bronze) Christin Steuer/Nora Subschinski (GER) 316.29
    - Chen wins the event for the third successive time.

==== Fencing ====
- European Championships in Sheffield, United Kingdom:
  - Men's épée team: (gold) France (Yannick Borel, Gauthier Grumier, Ronan Gustin, Jean-Michel Lucenay) (silver) Hungary (Gábor Boczkó, Géza Imre, András Rédli, Péter Somfai) (bronze) Russia (Anton Avdeev, Sergey Khodos, Pavel Sukhov, Alexey Tikhomirov)
  - Women's foil team: (gold) Italy (Elisa Di Francisca, Arianna Errigo, Ilaria Salvatori, Valentina Vezzali) (silver) Russia (Inna Deriglazova, Larisa Korobeynikova, Yevgeniya Lamonova, Aida Shanaeva) (bronze) Germany (Sandra Bingenheimer, Carolin Golubytskyi, Anja Schache, Katja Wächter)

==== Snooker ====
- Australian Goldfields Open in Bendigo, Australia, last 32:
  - **David Gilbert** (ENG) 5–1 James Mifsud (AUS)
  - **Shaun Murphy** (ENG) 5–3 Andrew Higginson (ENG)
  - Jamie Cope (ENG) 3–5 **Tom Ford** (ENG)
  - Judd Trump (ENG) 3–5 **Mark Davis** (ENG)
  - **Stephen Hendry** (SCO) 5–3 Martin Gould (ENG)
  - Peter Ebdon (ENG) 3–5 **Rory McLeod** (ENG)

==== Synchronized swimming ====
- World Aquatics Championships in Shanghai, China:
  - Duet technical routine: (gold) Natalia Ishchenko/Svetlana Romashina (RUS) 98.200 points (silver) Huang Xuechen/Liu Ou (CHN) 96.500 (bronze) Ona Carbonell/Andrea Fuentes (ESP) 95.400
    - Ishchenko wins her second title of the championships and eleventh world title overall.
    - Romashina wins the event for the second successive time and her eighth world title overall.

==== Water polo ====
- World Aquatics Championships in Shanghai, China:
  - Men's tournament:
    - Group A:
      - Hungary 11–10 Montenegro
      - Kazakhstan 5–18 Spain
    - Group B:
      - Romania 8–9 Australia
      - Serbia 17–5 China
    - Group C:
      - Brazil 5–14 Croatia
      - Japan 5–11 Canada
    - Group D:
      - United States 7–9 Germany
      - Italy 17–1 South Africa

=== July 17, 2011 (Sunday) ===
==== Athletics ====
- European U23 Championships in Ostrava, Czech Republic:
  - Men's 1500m: (gold) Florian Carvalho (FRA) 3:50.42 (silver) James Shane (GBR) 3:50.58 (bronze) David Bustos (ESP) 3:50.59
  - Men's 3000m steeplechase: (gold) Sebastián Martos (ESP) 8:35.35 (silver) Abdelaziz Merzougui (ESP) 8:36.21 (bronze) Alexandru Ghinea (ROM) 8:38.51
  - Men's 4 × 100 metres relay: (gold) Italy (Michael Tumi, Francesco Basciani, Davide Manenti, Delmas Obou) 39.05 (silver) Great Britain (Andrew Robertson, Kieran Showler-Davis, Richard Kilty, Daniel Talbot) 39.10 (bronze) Germany (Florian Hübner, Maximilian Kessler, Robin Erewa, Felix Göltl) 39.19
  - Men's 4 × 400 metres relay: (gold) Great Britain (Nigel Levine, Thomas Phillips, Jamie Bowie, Luke Lennon-Ford) 3:03.53 (silver) Poland (Michal Pietrzak, Jakub Krzewina, Lukasz Krawczuk, Mateusz Fórmanski) 3:03.62 (bronze) Russia (Aleksey Kenig, Anton Volobuev, Artem Vazhov, Vladimir Krasnov) 3:04.01
  - Men's 20km walk: (gold) Petr Bogatyrev (RUS) 1:24:20 (silver) Dawid Tomala (POL) 1:24:21 (bronze) Denis Strelkov (RUS) 1:24:25
  - Men's discus throw: (gold) Lawrence Okoye (GBR) 60.70m (silver) Mykyta Nesterenko (UKR) 59.67m (bronze) Fredrik Amundgård (NOR) 59.42m
  - Men's hammer throw: (gold) Paweł Fajdek (POL) 78.54m (silver) Javier Cienfuegos (ESP) 73.03m (bronze) Aleh Dubitski (BLR) 72.52m
  - Men's high jump: (gold) Bohdan Bondarenko (UKR) 2.30m (silver) Sergey Mudrov (RUS) 2.30m (bronze) Miguel Ángel Sancho (ESP) 2.21m
  - Men's triple jump: (gold) Sheryf El-Sheryf (UKR) 17.72m (silver) Aleksey Fyodorov (RUS) 16.85m (bronze) Yuriy Kovalyov (RUS) 16.82m
  - Women's 1500m: (gold) Elena Arzhakova (RUS) 4:20.55 (silver) Tuğba Karakaya (TUR) 4:20.80 (bronze) Corinna Harrer (GER) 4:21.52
  - Women's 5000m: (gold) Layes Abdullayeva (AZE) 15:29.47 (silver) Yekaterina Gorbunova (RUS) 15:45.14 (bronze) Stevie Stockton (GBR) 15:58.51
  - Women's 4 × 100 metres relay: (gold) Ukraine (Olena Yanovska, Darya Pizhankova, Viktoriya Pyatachenko, Ulyana Lepska) 44.00 (silver) Russia (Yekaterina Filatova, Alena Tamkova, Yekaterina Kuzina, Nina Argunova) 44.14 (bronze) France (Yariatou Toure, Sarah Goujon, Orlann Ombissa, Cornnelly Calydon) 44.26
  - Women's 4 × 400 metres relay: (gold) Russia (Yevgeniya Subbotina, Yekaterina Yefimova, Yuliya Terekhova, Olga Topilskaya) 3:27.72 (silver) Ukraine (Kateryna Plyashechuk, Alina Lohvynenko, Hanna Yaroshchuk, Yuilya Olishevska) 3:30.13 (bronze) France (Clemence Sorgnard, Marie Gayot, Elea-Mariama Diarra, Florie Guei) 3:31.73
  - Women's 20km walk: (gold) Tatyana Mineyeva (RUS) 1:31:42 (silver) Nina Okhotnikova (RUS) 1:31:51 (bronze) Julia Takacs (ESP) 1:31:55
  - Women's long jump: (gold) Darya Klishina (RUS) 7.05m (silver) Ivana Španović (SRB) 6.74m (bronze) Sosthene Moguenara (GER) 6.74m
  - Women's pole vault: (gold) Holly Bleasdale (GBR) 4.55m (silver) Katerina Stefanidi (GRE) 4.45m (bronze) Annika Roloff (GER) 4.40m
  - Women's heptathlon: (gold) Grit Šadeiko (EST) 6134 points (silver) Kateřina Cachová (CZE) 6123 (bronze) Yana Maksimava (BLR) 6075
- Central American and Caribbean Championships in Mayagüez, Puerto Rico:
  - Men's 110m hurdles: (gold) Eric Keddo (JAM) 13.49 (silver) Hector Cotto (PUR) 13.54 (bronze) Paulo Villar (COL) 13.60
  - Men's 200m: (gold) Michael Mathieu (BAH) 20.60 (silver) Rondel Sorrillo (TRI) 20.64 (bronze) Jason Young (JAM) 20.78
  - Men's 800m: (gold) Andy González (CUB) 1:48.15 (silver) Moise Joseph (HAI) 1:48.94 (bronze) Joel Mejia (DOM) 1:49.67
  - Men's 4 × 400 metres relay: (gold) Bahamas (Latoya Williams, Avard Moncur, Mathieu, Ramon Miller) 3:01.33 (silver) Trinidad and Tobago (Lalonde Gordon, Jarrin Solomon, Deon Lendore, Renny Quow) 3:01.65 (bronze) Jamaica (Dwight Mullings, Riker Hylton, Dawayne Barrett, Leford Green) 3:02.00
  - Men's 20 km walk: (gold) Allan Segura (CRC) 1:28:56.08 (silver) Joe Bonilla (PUR) 1:40:18.94 (bronze) Luis Ángel López (PUR) 1:40:34.16
  - Men's half-marathon: (gold) Luis Collazo (PUR) 1:07:08 (silver) Luis Rivera (PUR) 1:08:38 (bronze) Oscar Ceron (MEX) 1:09:17
  - Men's high jump: (gold) Trevor Barry (BAH) 2.28m (silver) James Grayman (ATG) 2.25m (bronze) Darwin Edwards (LCA) 2.25m
  - Men's triple jump: (gold) Samir Layne (HAI) 17.09m (silver) Osniel Tosca (CUB) 16.22m (bronze) Wilbert Walker (JAM) 16.01m
  - Women's 100m hurdles: (gold) Vonette Dixon (JAM) 12.77 (silver) Brigitte Merlano (COL) 12.89 (bronze) Lina Flórez (COL) 12.94
  - Women's 200m: (gold) Nivea Smith (BAH) 22.80 (silver) Anthonique Strachan (BAH) 22.90 (bronze) Anastasia Le-Roy (JAM) 23.13
  - Women's 800m: (gold) Gabriela Medina (MEX) 2:01.50 (silver) Rosemary Almanza (CUB) 2:02.23 (bronze) Natoya Goule (JAM) 2:02.83
  - Women's 3000m steeplechase: (gold) Korene Hinds (JAM) 9:54.67 (silver) Beverly Ramos (PUR) 9:58.11 (bronze) Sara Prieto (MEX) 10:42.65
  - Women's 4 × 400 metres relay: (gold) Jamaica (Andrea Sutherland, Shereefa Lloyd, Natoya Goule, Patricia Hall) 3:29.86 (silver) Dominican Republic (Raysa Sanchez, Diana Taylor, Rosa Fabian, Yolanda Osana) 3:34.73 (bronze) Trinidad and Tobago (Alena Harriman, Magnolia Howell, Josanne Lucas, Afiya Walker) 3:34.84
  - Women's 10 km walk: (gold) Milanggela Rosales (VEN) 47:19.91 (silver) Sandra Galvis (COL) 48:23.59 (bronze) Wilane Cuebas (PUR) 55:52.53
  - Women's half-marathon: (gold) Michelle Coira (PUR) 1:21:07 (silver) Maria del Pilar Diaz (PUR) 1:21:45 (bronze) Maria Montilla (VEN) 1:22:20
  - Women's javelin throw: (gold) Fresa Nuñez (DOM) 54.29m (silver) Flor Ruiz (COL) 54.02m (bronze) Abigail Gomez (MEX) 53.13m
  - Women's long jump: (gold) Bianca Stuart (BAH) 6.81m (silver) Arantxa King (BER) 6.47m (bronze) Yvonne Trevino (MEX) 6.30m
  - Women's shot put: (gold) Cleopatra Borel-Brown (TRI) 19.00m (silver) Angela Rivas (COL) 17.12m (bronze) Annie Alexander (TRI) 17.05m
  - Women's heptathlon: (gold) Gretchen Quintana (CUB) 5704 points (silver) Francia Manzanillo (DOM) 5601 (bronze) Peaches Roach (JAM) 5589

==== Auto racing ====
- Sprint Cup Series:
  - Lenox Industrial Tools 301 in Loudon, New Hampshire: (1) (Indiana) Ryan Newman (Chevrolet; Stewart Haas Racing) (2) (Indiana) Tony Stewart (Chevrolet; Stewart Haas Racing) (3) (Virginia) Denny Hamlin (Toyota; Joe Gibbs Racing)
    - Drivers' championship standings (after 19 of 36 races): (1) (Missouri) Carl Edwards (Ford; Roush Fenway Racing) 652 points (2) (California) Jimmie Johnson (Chevrolet; Hendrick Motorsports) 645 (3) (Nevada) Kurt Busch (Dodge; Penske Racing) 641
- World Touring Car Championship:
  - Race of UK in Castle Donington, Leicestershire:
    - Race 1: (1) Yvan Muller (FRA) (Chevrolet; Chevrolet Cruze) (2) Robert Huff (GBR) (Chevrolet; Chevrolet Cruze) (3) Alain Menu (SUI) (Chevrolet; Chevrolet Cruze)
    - Race 2: (1) Muller (2) Huff (3) Franz Engstler (GER) (Liqui Moly Team Engstler; BMW 320 TC)
      - Drivers' championship standings (after 7 of 12 rounds): (1) Huff 263 points (2) Muller 248 (3) Menu 192

==== Basketball ====
- FIBA Europe Under-20 Championship for Women in Novi Sad, Serbia:
  - Bronze medal game: (bronze) **Poland** 67–65 Serbia
  - Final: (silver) Russia 53–62 (gold) **Spain**
    - Spain win the title for the second time.

==== Cycling ====
- Grand Tours:
  - Tour de France, Stage 15: (gold) Mark Cavendish (GBR) (HTC–Highroad) 4h 20' 24" (silver) Tyler Farrar (USA) (Garmin–Cervélo) s.t. (bronze) Alessandro Petacchi (ITA) (Lampre–ISD) s.t.
    - General classification (after stage 15): (1) Thomas Voeckler (FRA) (Team Europcar) 65h 24' 34" (2) Fränk Schleck (LUX) (Leopard Trek) + 1' 49" (3) Cadel Evans (AUS) (BMC Racing Team) + 2' 06"

==== Diving ====
- World Aquatics Championships in Shanghai, China:
  - Men's 10 m synchro platform: (gold) Qiu Bo/Huo Liang (CHN) 480.03 points (silver) Patrick Hausding/Sascha Klein (GER) 443.01 (bronze) Oleksandr Gorshkovozov/Oleksandr Bondar (UKR) 435.36
    - Huo wins the event for the third successive time.

==== Equestrianism ====
- CHIO Aachen in Aachen, Germany:
  - Dressage – Grand Prix Freestyle (CDIO 5*): (gold) Matthias Alexander Rath (GER) on Totilas (silver) Steffen Peters (USA) on Ravel (bronze) Adelinde Cornelissen (NED) on Parzival
  - Show jumping – Grand Prix (CSIO 5*): (gold) Janne Friederike Meyer (GER) on Lambrasco (silver) Kevin Staut (FRA) on Silvana (bronze) Andreas Kreuzer (NED) on Chacco-Blue

==== Fencing ====
- European Championships in Sheffield, United Kingdom:
  - Men's foil team: (gold) Italy (Valerio Aspromonte, Giorgio Avola, Andrea Baldini, Andrea Cassarà) (silver) France (Brice Guyart, Erwann Le Péchoux, Marcel Marcilloux, Victor Sintès) (bronze) Russia (Aleksey Cheremisinov, Renal Ganeev, Dmitry Rigin, Artem Sedov)
  - Women's sabre team: (gold) Italy (Ilaria Bianco, Paola Guarneri, Gioia Marzocca, Irene Vecchi) (silver) Ukraine (Olha Kharlan, Olena Khomrova, Halyna Pundyk, Olha Zhovnir) (bronze) Russia (Yekaterina Dyachenko, Dina Galiakbarova, Yuliya Gavrilova, Sofiya Velikaya)

==== Football (soccer) ====
- FIFA Women's World Cup in Germany:
  - Final in Frankfurt: (gold) **Japan** 2–2 (3–1 pen.) (silver) United States
    - Japan become the first Asian team to win the World Cup.
- 2014 FIFA World Cup qualification (CONCACAF) First round, second leg (first leg score in parentheses):
  - **Belize** 3–1 (5–2) Montserrat. Belize win 8–3 on aggregate.
- Copa América in Argentina:
  - Quarterfinals:
    - Brazil 0–0 (0–2 pen.) **Paraguay** in La Plata
    - Chile 1–2 **Venezuela** in San Juan
- CAF Champions League Group stage, matchday 1:
  - Group A: Enyimba (Nigeria) 2–2 (Sudan) Al-Hilal
  - Group B: Al-Ahly (Egypt) 3–3 (Morocco) Wydad Casablanca
- CAF Confederation Cup Group stage, matchday 1:
  - Group A: ASEC Mimosas (Ivory Coast) 1–1 (Tunisia) Club Africain

==== Golf ====
- Men's majors:
  - The Open Championship in Sandwich, Kent, United Kingdom:
    - Leaderboard after final round: (1) Darren Clarke (NIR) 275 (−5) (T2) Dustin Johnson (USA) & Phil Mickelson (USA) 278 (−2)
      - Clarke becomes the fourth Northern Irish player to win a major, after Fred Daly at the 1947 Open Championship, Graeme McDowell at the 2010 U.S. Open & Rory McIlroy at the 2011 U.S. Open.
- PGA Tour:
  - Viking Classic in Madison, Mississippi:
    - Winner: Chris Kirk (USA) 266 (−22)
      - Kirk wins his first PGA Tour title.

==== Horse racing ====
- Canadian Thoroughbred Triple Crown:
  - Prince of Wales Stakes in Fort Erie, Ontario: (gold) Pender Harbour (trainer: Mike De Paulo; jockey: Luis Contreras) (silver) Bowman's Causeway (trainer: Chad Brown; jockey: Eurico Rosa da Silva) (bronze) Oh Canada (trainer: Bob Tiller; jockey: Krista Carignan)

==== Motorcycle racing ====
- Moto GP:
  - German Grand Prix in Hohenstein-Ernstthal, Germany:
    - MotoGP: (1) Dani Pedrosa (ESP) (Honda) (2) Jorge Lorenzo (ESP) (Yamaha) (3) Casey Stoner (AUS) (Honda)
      - Riders' championship standings (after 9 of 18 races): (1) Stoner 168 points (2) Lorenzo 153 (3) Andrea Dovizioso (ITA) (Honda) 132
    - Moto2: (1) Marc Márquez (ESP) (Suter) (2) Stefan Bradl (GER) (Kalex) (3) Alex de Angelis (SMR) (Motobi)
      - Riders' championship standings (after 9 of 17 races): (1) Bradl 167 points (2) Márquez 120 (3) Simone Corsi (ITA) (FTR) 84
    - 125cc: (1) Héctor Faubel (ESP) (Aprilia) (2) Johann Zarco (FRA) (Derbi) (3) Maverick Viñales (ESP) (Aprilia)
      - Faubel and Zarco finish the race in a dead heat, with Faubel awarded victory by virtue of having set a faster race lap than Zarco.
      - Riders' championship standings (after 9 of 17 races): (1) Nicolás Terol (ESP) (Aprilia) 166 points (2) Zarco 134 (3) Viñales 122

==== Synchronized swimming ====
- World Aquatics Championships in Shanghai, China:
  - Solo technical routine: (gold) Natalia Ishchenko (RUS) 98.300 points (silver) Huang Xuechen (CHN) 96.500 (bronze) Andrea Fuentes (ESP) 95.300
    - Ishchenko wins the event for the third successive time, and her tenth world title overall.

==== Snooker ====
- World Cup in Bangkok, Thailand:
  - Semi-finals:
    - Wales 1–4 **China**
    - Hong Kong 3–4 **Northern Ireland**
  - Final: **China** 4–2 Northern Ireland
    - China win the title for the first time.

==== Tennis ====
- ATP World Tour:
  - MercedesCup in Stuttgart, Germany:
    - Final: **Juan Carlos Ferrero** (ESP) def. Pablo Andújar (ESP) 6–4, 6–0
      - Ferrero wins his 16th career title.
  - SkiStar Swedish Open in Båstad, Sweden:
    - Final: **Robin Söderling** (SWE) def. David Ferrer (ESP) 6–2, 6–2
      - Söderling wins the title for the second time in three years, winning his fourth title of the year and tenth of his career.
- WTA Tour:
  - Internazionali Femminili di Palermo in Palermo, Italy:
    - Final: **Anabel Medina Garrigues** (ESP) def. Polona Hercog (SLO) 6–3, 6–2.
      - Medina Garrigues wins her second title of the year and 11th of her career. She wins the event for the fifth time.
  - Gastein Ladies in Bad Gastein, Austria:
    - Final: **María José Martínez Sánchez** (ESP) def. Patricia Mayr-Achleitner (AUT) 6–0, 7–5
      - Martínez Sánchez wins her fourth career title.

==== Triathlon ====
- ITU World Championships, Leg 4 in Hamburg, Germany:
  - Women (all AUS): (gold) Emma Moffatt 1:53:37 (silver) Emma Jackson 1:53.44 (bronze) Emma Snowsill 1:53:44
    - Standings (after 4 of 6 events): (1) Bárbara Riveros Díaz (CHI) 2498 points (2) Paula Findlay (CAN) 2400 (3) Andrea Hewitt (NZL) 2318

==== Volleyball ====
- Men's European League Final Four in Košice, Slovakia:
  - Bronze medal match: (bronze) **Slovenia** 3–0 Romania
  - Final: (silver) Spain 2–3 (gold) **Slovakia**
    - Slovakia win the title for the second time.

==== Water polo ====
- World Aquatics Championships in Shanghai, China:
  - Women's tournament:
    - Group A:
      - Netherlands 7–7 United States
      - Kazakhstan 6–21 Hungary
    - Group B:
      - Australia 7–10 Canada
      - New Zealand 19–6 Uzbekistan
    - Group C:
      - Brazil 4–15 Russia
      - Greece 10–9 Spain
    - Group D:
      - Italy 12–4 Cuba
      - South Africa 5–22 China

=== July 16, 2011 (Saturday) ===
==== American football ====
- IFAF World Championship in Vienna, Austria:
  - 5th place match: France 17–21 **Germany**
  - Gold medal match: (silver) Canada 7–50 (gold) **United States**
    - The United States win the title for the second successive time.

==== Athletics ====
- European U23 Championships in Ostrava, Czech Republic:
  - Men's 200m: (gold) Lykourgos-Stefanos Tsakonas (GRE) 20.56 (silver) James Alaka (GBR) 20.60 (bronze) Pavel Maslák (CZE) 20.67
  - Men's 400m: (gold) Nigel Levine (GBR) 46.10 (silver) Brian Gregan (IRL) 46.12 (bronze) Luke Lennon-Ford (GBR) 46.22
  - Men's 5000m: (gold) Sindre Buraas (NOR) 14:22.69 (silver) Ross Millington (GBR) 14:22.78 (bronze) Jesper van der Wielen (NED) 14:23.31
  - Men's 110m hurdles: (gold) Sergey Shubenkov (RUS) 13.56 (silver) Balázs Baji (HUN) 13.58 (bronze) Lawrence Clarke (GBR) 13.62
  - Men's 400m hurdles: (gold) Jack Green (GBR) 49.13 (silver) Nathan Woodward (GBR) 49.28 (bronze) Emir Bekric (SRB) 49.61
  - Men's pole vault: (gold) Paweł Wojciechowski (POL) 5.70m (silver) Karsten Dilla (GER) 5.60m (bronze) Dmitriy Zhelyabin (RUS) 5.55m
  - Men's javelin throw: (gold) Till Wöschler (GER) 84.38m (silver) Fatih Avan (TUR) 84.11m (bronze) Dmitry Tarabin (RUS) 83.18m
  - Women's 200m: (gold) Darya Pizhankova (UKR) 23.20 (silver) Anna Kielbasinska (POL) 23.23 (bronze) Moa Hjelmer (SWE) 23.24
  - Women's 400m: (gold) Olga Topilskaya (RUS) 51.45 (silver) Yuliya Terekhova (RUS) 52.63 (bronze) Lena Schmidt (GER) 52.66
  - Women's 100m hurdles: (gold) Alina Talay (BLR) 12.91 (silver) Lisa Urech (SUI) 13.00 (bronze) Cindy Roleder (GER) 13.10
  - Women's 400m hurdles: (gold) Hanna Yaroshchuk (UKR) 54.77 (silver) Hanna Titimets (UKR) 54.91 (bronze) Meghan Beesley (GBR) 55.69
  - Women's 3000m steeplechase: (gold) Gülcan Mıngır (TUR) 9:47.83 (silver) Jana Sussmann (GER) 9:48.01 (bronze) Mariya Shatalova (UKR) 9:48.22
  - Women's high jump: (gold) Esthera Petre (ROM) 1.98m (silver) Oksana Okuneva (UKR) 1.94m (bronze) Burcu Ayhan (TUR) 1.94m
  - Women's hammer throw: (gold) Bianca Perie (ROM) 71.59m (silver) Joanna Fiodorow (POL) 70.06m (bronze) Sophie Hitchon (GBR) 69.59m
  - Women's javelin throw: (gold) Sarah Mayer (GER) 59.29m (silver) Vira Rebryk (UKR) 58.95m (bronze) Oona Sormunen (FIN) 58.54m
- Central American and Caribbean Championships in Mayagüez, Puerto Rico:
  - Men's 5000m: (gold) José Uribe (MEX) 14:08.10 (silver) Luis Orta (VEN) 14:14.30 (bronze) Julio Pérez (MEX) 14:22.01
  - Men's 3000m steeplechase: (gold) Luis Enrique Ibarra (MEX) 8:55.86 (silver) Fernando Roman (PUR) 8:58.95 (bronze) Aaron Arias (MEX) 9:01.35
  - Men's 400m hurdles: (gold) Leford Green (JAM) 49.03 (silver) Félix Sánchez (DOM) 49.41 (bronze) Jehue Gordon (TRI) 50.10
  - Men's pole vault: (gold) Cristian Sanchez (MEX) 5.00m (silver) Alexander Castillo (PUR) 4.90m (bronze) César González (VEN) 4.90m
  - Men's long jump: (gold) Tyrone Smith (BER) 8.06m (silver) Damar Forbes (JAM) 7.81m (bronze) Raymond Higgs (BAH) 7.75m
  - Men's hammer throw: (gold) Roberto Janet (CUB) 71.65m (silver) Roberto Sawyer (CRC) 65.96m (bronze) Pedro Muñoz (VEN) 63.63m
  - Men's javelin throw: (gold) Guillermo Martínez (CUB) 81.55m (silver) Arley Ibargüen (COL) 75.71m (bronze) Jaime Dayron Marquez (COL) 74.07m
  - Men's decathlon: (gold) Marcos Sanchez (PUR) 7397 points (silver) Claston Bernard (JAM) 7299 (bronze) Jonathan Davis (VEN) 6766
  - Men's 4 × 100 m relay: (gold) Jamaica (Lerone Clarke, Dexter Lee, Jason Young, Oshane Bailey) 38.81 (silver) Trinidad and Tobago (Aaron Armstrong, Darrel Brown, Emmanuel Callander, Keston Bledman) 38.89 (bronze) Saint Kitts and Nevis (Jason Rogers, Kim Collins, Antoine Adams, Brijesh Lawrence) 39.07
  - Women's 5000m: (gold) Marisol Romero (MEX) 16:05.68 (silver) Sandra Lopez (MEX) 16:06.83 (bronze) Johana Rivero (COL) 17:23.01
  - Women's 400m hurdles: (gold) Andrea Sutherland (JAM) 56.75 (silver) Yolanda Osana (DOM) 57.23 (bronze) Katrina Seymour (BAH) 57.24
  - Women's high jump: (gold) Levern Spencer (LCA) 1.82m (silver) Marielys Rojas (VEN) 1.82m (bronze) Fabiola Ayala (MEX) 1.79m
  - Women's 4 × 100 m relay: (gold) Trinidad and Tobago (Magnolia Howell, Michelle-Lee Ayhe, Ayanna Hutchinson, Semoy Hackett) 43.47 (silver) Jamaica (Jura Levy, Anastasia Le-Roy, Simone Facey, Patricia Hall) 43.63 (bronze) Bahamas (V'Alonne Robinson, Nivea Smith, Cache Armbrister, Anthonique Strachan) 43.74

==== Auto racing ====
- Nationwide Series:
  - New England 200 in Loudon, New Hampshire: (1) (Nevada) Kyle Busch (Toyota; Joe Gibbs Racing) (2) (California) Kevin Harvick (Chevrolet; Kevin Harvick Incorporated) (3) (Washington (state)) Kasey Kahne (Chevrolet; JR Motorsports)
    - Busch wins his 49th race in the secondary class, tying Mark Martin's record. Busch's victory is also his 100th in the NASCAR national series — Sprint Cup, Nationwide Series and Camping World Truck Series — and becomes the third person to reach that mark, after Richard Petty and David Pearson.
    - Drivers' championship standings (after 19 of 34 races): (1) (Virginia) Elliott Sadler (Chevrolet; Kevin Harvick Incorporated) 673 points (2) (Georgia (U.S. state)) Reed Sorenson (Chevrolet; Turner Motorsports) 666 (3) (Mississippi) Ricky Stenhouse Jr. (Ford; Roush Fenway Racing) 655

==== Cycling ====
- Grand Tours:
  - Tour de France, Stage 14: (gold) Jelle Vanendert (BEL) (Omega Pharma–Lotto) 5h 13' 25" (silver) Samuel Sánchez (ESP) (Euskaltel–Euskadi) + 21" (bronze) Andy Schleck (LUX) (Leopard Trek) + 46"
    - General classification (after stage 14): (1) Thomas Voeckler (FRA) (Team Europcar) 61h 04' 10" (2) Fränk Schleck (LUX) (Leopard Trek) + 1' 49" (3) Cadel Evans (AUS) (BMC Racing Team) + 2' 06"

==== Diving ====
- World Aquatics Championships in Shanghai, China:
  - Women's 3 m synchro springboard: (gold) Wu Minxia/He Zi (CHN) 356.40 points (silver) Émilie Heymans/Jennifer Abel (CAN) 313.50 (bronze) Anabelle Smith/Sharleen Stratton (AUS) 306.90
    - Wu wins the event for the fifth time. He wins her first synchro springboard title and second world championship title.

==== Equestrianism ====
- CHIO Aachen in Aachen, Germany:
  - Dressage – Grand Prix Spécial: (gold) Matthias Alexander Rath (GER) on Totilas (silver) Adelinde Cornelissen (NLD) on Parzival (bronze) Isabell Werth (GER) on El Santo NRW
  - Eventing – CICO 3*:
    - Team result: (gold) Great Britain (William Fox-Pitt, Mary King, Polly Stockton, Nicola Wilson) (silver) New Zealand Clarke Johnstone, Caroline Powell, Andrew Nicholson, Jonathan Paget) (bronze) Sweden (Sara Algotsson-Ostholt, Christoffer Forsberg, Malin Petersen, Katrin Norling)
    - Individual result: (gold) Michael Jung (GER) on Sam FBW (silver) Stefano Brecciaroli (ITA) on Apollo van de Wendi Kurt Hoeve (bronze) Fox-Pitt on Neuf des Coeurs
  - Show jumping – Best of Champions: (gold) Janne Friederike Meyer (GER) on Holiday by Solitour (silver) Rolf-Göran Bengtsson (SWE) on Carusso (bronze) Denis Lynch (IRL) on Lord Luis

==== Fencing ====
- European Championships in Sheffield, United Kingdom:
  - Men's sabre individual: (gold) Aleksey Yakimenko (RUS) (silver) Bolade Apithy (FRA) (bronze) Max Hartung (GER) & Áron Szilágyi (HUN)
  - Women's épée individual: (gold) Tiffany Geroudet (SUI) (silver) Britta Heidemann (GER) (bronze) Ana Maria Brânză (ROM) & Nathalie Möllhausen (ITA)

==== Football (soccer) ====
- FIFA Women's World Cup in Germany:
  - Third place play-off in Sinsheim: (bronze) **Sweden** 2–1 France
- Copa América in Argentina:
  - Quarterfinals:
    - Colombia 0–2 (a.e.t.) **Peru** in Córdoba
    - Argentina 1–1 (4–5 pen.) **Uruguay** in Santa Fe
- CAF Champions League Group stage, matchday 1:
  - Group A: Raja Casablanca (Morocco) 0–0 (Cameroon) Coton Sport
  - Group B: MC Alger (Algeria) 1–1 (Tunisia) Espérance ST
- CAF Confederation Cup Group stage, matchday 1:
  - Group A: Kaduna United (Nigeria) 1–1 (Angola) Inter Luanda
  - Group B:
    - Sunshine Stars (Nigeria) 2–0 (Democratic Republic of the Congo) Motema Pembe
    - Maghreb de Fès (Morocco) 1–0 (Algeria) JS Kabylie

==== Golf ====
- Men's majors:
  - The Open Championship in Sandwich, Kent, United Kingdom:
    - Leaderboard after third round: (1) Darren Clarke (NIR) 205 (−5) (2) Dustin Johnson (USA) 206 (−4) (T3) Thomas Bjørn (DEN) & Rickie Fowler (USA) 208 (−2)

==== Snooker ====
- World Cup in Bangkok, Thailand:
  - Quarter-finals:
    - **Wales** 4–2 Australia
    - **China** 4–1 Republic of Ireland
    - England 3–4 **Hong Kong**
    - Scotland 3–4 **Northern Ireland**

==== Triathlon ====
- ITU World Championships, Leg 4 in Hamburg, Germany:
  - Men: (gold) Brad Kahlefeldt (AUS) 1:44:08 (silver) William Clarke (GBR) 1:44:09 (bronze) David Hauss (FRA) 1:44:09
    - Standings (after 4 of 6 events): (1) Javier Gómez (ESP) 2027 points (2) Clarke 1935 (3) Hauss 1907

==== Volleyball ====
- Women's European League Final Four in Istanbul, Turkey:
  - Bronze medal match: Czech Republic 0–3 (bronze) **Bulgaria**
  - Final: (gold) **Serbia** 3–0 (silver) Turkey
    - Serbia win the title for the third successive time.
- Men's European League Final Four in Košice, Slovakia:
  - Semifinals:
    - Slovenia 2–3 **Spain**
    - **Slovakia** 3–0 Romania

=== July 15, 2011 (Friday) ===
==== American football ====
- IFAF World Championship in Vienna, Austria:
  - 7th place match: Australia 10–48 **Austria**
  - Bronze medal match: Mexico 14–17 (bronze) **Japan**

==== Athletics ====
- European U23 Championships in Ostrava, Czech Republic:
  - Men's 100m: (gold) James Alaka (GBR) 10.45 (silver) Michael Tumi (ITA) 10.47 (bronze) Andrew Robertson (GBR) 10.52
  - Men's 800m: (gold) Adam Kszczot (POL) 1:46.71 (silver) Kevin López (ESP) 1:46.93 (bronze) Mukhtar Mohammed (GBR) 1:48.01
  - Men's long jump: (gold) Aleksandr Menkov (RUS) 8.08m (silver) Marcos Chuva (POR) 7.94m (bronze) Guillaume Victorin (FRA) 7.86m
  - Men's decathlon: (gold) Thomas van der Plaetsen (BEL) 8157 points (silver) Eduard Mikhan (BLR) 8152 (bronze) Mihail Dudas (SRB) 8117
  - Women's discus throw: (gold) Julia Fischer (GER) 59.60m (silver) Nastassia Kashtanava (BLR) 56.25m (bronze) Anita Márton (HUN) 54.14m
  - Women's triple jump: (gold) Paraskevi Papahristou (GRE) 14.40m (silver) Carmen Toma (ROM) 13.92m (bronze) Anna Jagaciak (POL) 13.86m
  - Women's 100m: (gold) Andreea Ograzeanu (ROM) 11.65 (silver) Darya Pizhankova (UKR) 11.69 (bronze) Leena Günther (GER) 11.75
  - Women's 800m: (gold) Elena Arzhakova (RUS) 1:59.41 (silver) Merve Aydın (TUR) 2:00.46 (bronze) Lynsey Sharp (GBR) 2:00.65
  - Women's 10,000m: (gold) Layesh Abdullayeva (AZE) 32:18.05 (silver) Lyudmyla Kovalenko (UKR) 33:35.36 (bronze) Catarina Ribeiro (POR) 34:10.39
  - Women's shot put: (gold) Yevgeniya Kolodko (RUS) 18.87m (silver) Sophie Kleeberg (GER) 17.92m (bronze) Melissa Boekelman (NED) 17.88m
- Central American and Caribbean Championships in Mayagüez, Puerto Rico:
  - Men's 100m: (gold) Keston Bledman (TRI) 10.05 (silver) Daniel Bailey (ATG) 10.11 (bronze) Dexter Lee (JAM) 10.18
  - Men's 400m: (gold) Renny Quow (TRI) 45.44 (silver) Ramon Miller (BAH) 45.56 (bronze) Erison Hurtault (DMA) 45.93
  - Men's 1500m: (gold) Nico Herrera (VEN) 3:44.92 (silver) Jose Esparza (MEX) 3:45.78 (bronze) Jon Rankin (CAY) 3:46.09
  - Men's 10,000m: (gold) Juan Romero (MEX) 28:54.06 (silver) Alejandro Suárez (MEX) 29:15.49 (bronze) Milton Ayala (COL) 30:55.71
  - Men's shot put: (gold) O'Dayne Richards (JAM) 19.16m (silver) Stephen Saenz (MEX) 18.66m (bronze) Eder Moreno (COL) 18.52m
  - Men's discus throw: (gold) Jason Morgan (JAM) 60.20m (silver) Mario Cota (MEX) 58.80m (bronze) Quincy Wilson (TRI) 56.85m
  - Women's 100m: (gold) Semoy Hackett (TRI) 11.27 (silver) Jura Levy (JAM) 11.36 (bronze) Simone Facey (JAM) 11.39
  - Women's 400m: (gold) Shereefa Lloyd (JAM) 51.69 (silver) Patricia Hall (JAM) 51.85 (bronze) Norma Gonzalez (COL) 51.90
  - Women's 1500m: (gold) Sandra Lopez (MEX) 4:22.65 (silver) Korene Hinds (JAM) 4:23.78 (bronze) Pilar McShine (TRI) 4:24.93
  - Women's triple jump: (gold) Ayanna Alexander (TRI) 13.50m (silver) Aida Villareal (MEX) 13.40m (bronze) Ana José (DOM) 13.11m
  - Women's pole vault: (gold) Keisa Monterola (VEN) 4.00m (silver) Milena Agudelo (COL) 3.95m (bronze) Andrea Zambrana (PUR) 3.80m
  - Women's discus throw: (gold) Denia Caballero (CUB) 62.06m (silver) Brittany Borrero (PUR) 54.03m (bronze) Allison Randall (JAM) 52.75m
  - Women's hammer throw: (gold) Johana Moreno (COL) 67.97m (silver) Rosa Rodríguez (VEN) 65.74m (bronze) Natalie Grant (JAM) 62.46m

==== Cycling ====
- Grand Tours:
  - Tour de France, Stage 13: (gold) Thor Hushovd (NOR) (Garmin–Cervélo) 3h 47' 36" (silver) David Moncoutié (FRA) (Cofidis) + 10" (bronze) Jérémy Roy (FRA) (FDJ) + 26"
    - General classification (after stage 13): (1) Thomas Voeckler (FRA) (Team Europcar) 55h 49' 57" (2) Fränk Schleck (LUX) (Leopard Trek) + 1' 49" (3) Cadel Evans (AUS) (BMC Racing Team) + 2' 06"

==== Fencing ====
- European Championships in Sheffield, United Kingdom:
  - Men's épée individual: (gold) Jörg Fiedler (GER) (silver) Bas Verwijlen (NED) (bronze) Max Heinzer (SUI) & Tomasz Motyka (POL)
  - Women's foil individual: (gold) Elisa Di Francisca (ITA) (silver) Valentina Vezzali (ITA) (bronze) Edina Knapek (HUN) & Yevgeniya Lamonova (RUS)

==== Golf ====
- Men's majors:
  - The Open Championship in Sandwich, Kent, United Kingdom:
    - Leaderboard after second round: (T1) Darren Clarke (NIR) & Lucas Glover (USA) 136 (−4) (T3) Thomas Bjørn (DEN), Chad Campbell (USA), Martin Kaymer (GER) & Miguel Ángel Jiménez (ESP) 137 (−3)

==== Snooker ====
- World Cup in Bangkok, Thailand (teams in **bold** advance to quarter-finals):
  - Group A:
    - Egypt 2–3 Pakistan
    - **Wales** 3–2 **Republic of Ireland**
      - Final standings: Wales 14 points, Republic of Ireland 11, Pakistan 10, Germany 9, Egypt 6.
  - Group B:
    - United Arab Emirates 1–4 **Australia**
    - Thailand 1 1–4 **China**
      - Final standings: China, Australia 13 points, Malta 12, Thailand 1 8, United Arab Emirates 4.
  - Group C:
    - Brazil 1–4 India
    - **England** 3–2 **Northern Ireland**
      - Final standings: England 14 points, Northern Ireland 13 points, India 9, Belgium 8, Brazil 6.
  - Group D:
    - Thailand 2 4–1 Poland
    - **Scotland** 3–2 **Hong Kong**
      - Final standings: Scotland 13 points, Hong Kong 11, Thailand 2 10, Afghanistan 9, Poland 7.

==== Surfing ====
- Women's World Tour:
  - Roxy Pro in Biarritz, France: (1) Stephanie Gilmore (USA) (2) Carissa Moore (USA) (3) Sally Fitzgibbons (AUS) & Pauline Ado (FRA)
    - Standings (after 6 of 7 events): (1) Moore 55,000 points (2) Fitzgibbons 48,150 (3) Gilmore 39,350

==== Volleyball ====
- Women's European League Final Four in Istanbul, Turkey:
  - Semifinals:
    - **Serbia** 3–0 Czech Republic
    - **Turkey** 3–0 Bulgaria

=== July 14, 2011 (Thursday) ===
==== Athletics ====
- European U23 Championships in Ostrava, Czech Republic:
  - Men's shot put: (gold) David Storl (GER) 20.45m (silver) Dmytro Savytskyy (UKR) 19.18m (bronze) Marin Premeru (CRO) 18.83m
  - Men's 10,000m: (gold) Sondre Nordstad Moen (NOR) 28:41.66 (silver) Ahmed El Mazoury (ITA) 28:46.97 (bronze) Musa Roba-Kinkal (GER) 28:57.91

==== Cycling ====
- Grand Tours:
  - Tour de France, Stage 12: (gold) Samuel Sánchez (ESP) (Euskaltel–Euskadi) 6h 01' 15" (silver) Jelle Vanendert (BEL) (Omega Pharma–Lotto) + 7" (bronze) Fränk Schleck (LUX) (Leopard Trek) + 10"
    - General classification (after stage 12): (1) Thomas Voeckler (FRA) (Team Europcar) 51h 54' 44" (2) Schleck + 1' 49" (3) Cadel Evans (AUS) (BMC Racing Team) + 2' 06"

==== Equestrianism ====
- CHIO Aachen in Aachen, Germany:
  - Dressage – Grand Prix de Dressage (CDIO 5*):
    - Team result (Nations Cup of Germany): (gold) Germany (Anabel Balkenhol, Christoph Koschel, Isabell Werth, Matthias Alexander Rath) (silver) Great Britain (Richard Davison, Charlotte Dujardin, Emile Faurie, Laura Bechtolsheimer) (bronze) Netherlands (Marlies van Baalen, Hans Peter Minderhoud, Edward Gal, Adelinde Cornelissen)
    - Individual result: (gold) Rath on Totilas (silver) Bechtolsheimer on Mistral Hojris (bronze) Werth on El Santo NRW
  - Show jumping – FEI Nations Cup:
    - Nations Cup of Germany (CSIO 5*): (gold) Netherlands (Eric van der Vleuten, Jur Vrieling, Gerco Schröder, Jeroen Dubbeldam) (silver) Ireland (Shane Breen, Shane Sweetnam, Denis Lynch, Billy Twomey), Great Britain (Guy Williams, Nick Skelton, Scott Brash, Michael Whitaker) & Germany (Christian Ahlmann, Janne Friederike Meyer, Carsten-Otto Nagel, Ludger Beerbaum)
      - Standings (after 5 of 8 events): (1) Netherlands 39.5 points (2) Ireland 30 (3) Germany 27

==== Fencing ====
- European Championships in Sheffield, United Kingdom:
  - Women's sabre individual: (gold) Olha Kharlan (UKR) (silver) Aleksandra Socha (POL) (bronze) Julia Gavrilova (RUS) & Halyna Pundyk (UKR)
  - Men's foil individual (ITA unless stated): (gold) Giorgio Avola (silver) Andrea Cassarà (bronze) Andrea Baldini & Alexey Cheremisinov (RUS)

==== Football (soccer) ====
- UEFA Europa League Second qualifying round, first leg:
  - Shakhter Karagandy (Kazakhstan) 2–1 (Republic of Ireland) St Patrick's Athletic
  - Metalurgist Rustavi (Georgia (country)) 1–1 (Kazakhstan) Irtysh Pavlodar
  - Śląsk Wrocław (Poland) 1–0 (Scotland) Dundee United
  - Rad (Serbia) 0–1 (Greece) Olympiacos Volos
  - KuPS (Finland) 1–0 (Romania) Gaz Metan Mediaș
  - Flamurtari Vlorë (Albania) 0–2 (Czech Republic) Jablonec
  - Iskra-Stal (Moldova) 1–1 (Croatia) Varaždin
  - Tauras Tauragė (Lithuania) 2–3 (Netherlands) ADO Den Haag
  - Rudar Pljevlja (Montenegro) 0–3 Austria Wien
  - TPS (Finland) 0–1 (Belgium) Westerlo
  - Sant Julià (Andorra) 0–2 (Israel) Bnei Yehuda
  - Minsk (Belarus) 1–1 (Turkey) Gaziantepspor
  - Örebro (Sweden) 0–0 (Bosnia and Herzegovina) Sarajevo
  - Shakhtyor Soligorsk (Belarus) 0–1 (Latvia) Ventspils
  - Vålerenga (Norway) 1–0 (Armenia) Mika
  - Ferencváros (Hungary) 2–1 (Norway) Aalesund
  - Häcken (Sweden) 1–0 (Finland) Honka
  - Anorthosis (Cyprus) 3–0 (Georgia (country)) Gagra
  - Floriana (Malta) 0–8 (Cyprus) AEK Larnaca
  - Maccabi Tel Aviv (Israel) 3–1 (Azerbaijan) Khazar Lankaran
  - Llanelli (Wales) 2–1 (Georgia (country)) Dinamo Tbilisi
  - Sūduva Marijampolė (Lithuania) 1–1 (Sweden) Elfsborg
  - Olimpija Ljubljana (Slovenia) 2–0 (Republic of Ireland) Bohemians
  - Differdange 03 (Luxembourg) 0–0 (Estonia) Levadia Tallinn
  - Tirana (Albania) 0–0 (Slovakia) Spartak Trnava
  - The New Saints (Wales) 1–3 (Denmark) Midtjylland
  - Vaduz (Liechtenstein) 0–2 (Serbia) Vojvodina
  - EB/Streymur (Faroe Islands) 1–1 (Azerbaijan) Qarabağ
  - Paks (Hungary) 1–1 (Norway) Tromsø
  - Kecskemét (Hungary) 1–1 (Kazakhstan) Aktobe
  - Željezničar (Bosnia and Herzegovina) 1–0 (Moldova) Sheriff Tiraspol
  - Juvenes/Dogana (San Marino) 0–1 (North Macedonia) Rabotnički
  - Liepājas Metalurgs (Latvia) 1–4 (Austria) Red Bull Salzburg
  - Vllaznia Shkodër (Albania) 0–0 (Switzerland) Thun
  - Metalurg Skopje (North Macedonia) 0–0 (Bulgaria) Lokomotiv Sofia
  - Glentoran (Northern Ireland) 0–2 (Ukraine) Vorskla Poltava
  - Crusaders (Northern Ireland) 1–3 (England) Fulham
  - Domžale (Slovenia) 1–2 (Croatia) Split
  - KR Reykjavík (Iceland) 3–0 (Slovakia) Žilina
  - FH (Iceland) 1–1 (Portugal) Nacional

==== Golf ====
- Men's majors:
  - The Open Championship in Sandwich, Kent, United Kingdom:
    - Leaderboard after first round: (T1) Thomas Bjørn (DEN) & Tom Lewis (ENG) (a) 65 (−5) (T3) Lucas Glover (USA), Miguel Ángel Jiménez (ESP) & Webb Simpson (USA) 66 (−4)
      - Lewis records the lowest score by an amateur at the Open, and becomes the first amateur to hold the lead of the Open since Michael Bonallack (ENG) in 1968. He is also the first amateur to lead any major since Mike Reid (USA) led after the first round of the 1976 U.S. Open.

==== Snooker ====
- World Cup in Bangkok, Thailand (teams in **bold** advance to quarter-finals):
  - Group A:
    - Wales 3–2 Pakistan
    - Germany 2–3 Republic of Ireland
      - Standings: Wales 11 points (3 matches), Republic of Ireland 9 (3), Germany 9 (4), Pakistan 7 (3), Egypt 4 (3).
  - Group B:
    - United Arab Emirates 0–5 Malta
    - China 3–2 Australia
      - Standings: Malta 12 points (4 matches), China, Australia 9 (3), Thailand 1 7 (3), United Arab Emirates 3 (3).
  - Group C:
    - Belgium 2–3 **Northern Ireland**
    - **England** 4–1 India
      - Standings: England, Northern Ireland 11 points (3 matches), Belgium 8 (4), Brazil, India 5 (3).
  - Group D:
    - Poland 1–4 Afghanistan
    - Scotland 3–2 Thailand 2
      - Standings: Scotland 10 points (3 matches), Hong Kong 9 (3), Afghanistan 9 (4), Poland, Thailand 2 6 (3).

=== July 13, 2011 (Wednesday) ===
==== American football ====
- IFAF World Championship in Austria (team in **bold** advances to final):
  - Group 2 in Graz:
    - Japan 27–31 **Canada**
    - Austria 16–24 France
      - Final standings: Canada 3–0, Japan 2–1, France 1–2, Austria 0–3.

==== Cricket ====
- Tri-nation series in Scotland in Edinburgh: Sri Lanka 284/7 (50 overs); Scotland 101 (32.4 overs; Lasith Malinga 5/30). **Sri Lanka win by 183 runs.**
  - Final standings: Sri Lanka 7 points, Scotland 4, Ireland 2.

==== Cycling ====
- Grand Tours:
  - Tour de France, Stage 11: (gold) Mark Cavendish (GBR) (HTC–Highroad) 3h 46' 07" (silver) André Greipel (GER) (Omega Pharma–Lotto) s.t. (bronze) Tyler Farrar (USA) (Garmin–Cervélo) s.t.
    - General classification (after stage 11): (1) Thomas Voeckler (FRA) (Team Europcar) 45h 52' 39" (2) Luis León Sánchez (ESP) (Rabobank) + 1' 49" (3) Cadel Evans (AUS) (BMC Racing Team) + 2' 26"

==== Equestrianism ====
- CHIO Aachen in Aachen, Germany:
  - Show jumping – Prize of Europe (CSIO 5*): (gold) Meredith Michaels-Beerbaum (GER) on Shutterfly (silver) Ludger Beerbaum (GER) on Chaman (bronze) Laura Kraut (USA) on Teirra

==== Football (soccer) ====
- FIFA Women's World Cup in Germany:
  - Semifinals:
    - France 1–3 **United States** in Mönchengladbach
      - The United States reach the final for a record-equalling third time.
    - **Japan** 3–1 Sweden in Frankfurt
      - Japan reach the final for the first time.
- Copa América in Argentina (teams in **bold** advance to quarterfinals):
  - Group B:
    - **Paraguay** 3–3 **Venezuela** in Salta
    - **Brazil** 4–2 Ecuador in Córdoba
      - Final standings: Brazil, Venezuela 5 points, Paraguay 3, Ecuador 1.
- UEFA Champions League Second qualifying round, first leg:
  - Zestaponi (Georgia (country)) 3–0 (Moldova) Dacia Chişinău
  - Maccabi Haifa (Israel) 5–1 (Bosnia and Herzegovina) Borac Banja Luka
  - Malmö FF (Sweden) 2–0 (Faroe Islands) HB Tórshavn
  - Bangor City (Wales) 0–3 (Finland) HJK Helsinki
  - Skënderbeu Korçë (Albania) 0–2 (Cyprus) APOEL
  - Dinamo Zagreb (Croatia) 3–0 (Azerbaijan) Neftchi Baku
  - Sturm Graz (Austria) 2–0 (Hungary) Videoton
  - Skonto (Latvia) 0–1 (Poland) Wisła Kraków
  - Partizan (Serbia) 4–0 (North Macedonia) Škendija
  - Rosenborg (Norway) 5–0 (Iceland) Breiðablik
  - Linfield (Northern Ireland) 1–1 (Belarus) BATE Borisov

==== Rugby union ====
- IRB Pacific Nations Cup, round 3 in Lautoka, Fiji:
  - Tonga 29–19 Samoa
  - Japan 24–13 Fiji
    - Final standings: Japan, Tonga 10 points, Fiji, Samoa 5.
      - Japan win the title for the first time.

==== Snooker ====
- World Cup in Bangkok, Thailand:
  - Group A:
    - Egypt 1–4 Republic of Ireland
    - Wales 3–2 Germany
      - Standings: Wales 8 points (2 matches), Germany 7 (3), Republic of Ireland 6 (2), Pakistan 5 (2), Egypt 4 (3).
  - Group B:
    - Thailand 1 2–3 Malta
    - China 3–2 United Arab Emirates
      - Standings: Australia 7 points (2 matches), Malta, Thailand 1 7 (3), China 6 (2), United Arab Emirates 3 (2).
  - Group C:
    - Brazil 1–4 Northern Ireland
    - England 3–2 Belgium
      - Standings: Northern Ireland 8 points (2 matches), England 7 (2), Belgium 6 (3), Brazil 5 (3), India 4 (2).
  - Group D:
    - Scotland 4–1 Afghanistan
    - Thailand 2 1–4 Hong Kong
      - Standings: Hong Kong 9 points (3 matches), Scotland 7 (2), Poland, Afghanistan 5 (3), Thailand 2 4 (2).

=== July 12, 2011 (Tuesday) ===
==== American football ====
- IFAF World Championship in Austria (team in **bold** advances to final):
  - Group 1 in Innsbruck:
    - Germany 30–20 Australia
    - Mexico 7–17 **United States**
      - Final standings: United States 3–0, Mexico 2–1, Germany 1–2, Australia 0–3.

==== Baseball ====
- Major League Baseball All-Star Game in Phoenix: National League 5, American League 1.
  - The National League win back-to-back All-Star Games for the first time since winning three in succession between 1994 and 1996. Milwaukee Brewers first baseman Prince Fielder is named as Most Valuable Player, after a three-run go-ahead home run in the fourth inning.

==== Cricket ====
- Tri-nation series in Scotland in Edinburgh: Ireland 320/8 (50 overs; Paul Stirling 113); Scotland 323/5 (48.3 overs). **Scotland win by 5 wickets.**
  - Standings: Scotland 4 points (1 match), Ireland 2 (2), Sri Lanka 2 (1).

==== Cycling ====
- Grand Tours:
  - Tour de France, Stage 10: (gold) André Greipel (GER) (Omega Pharma–Lotto) 3h 31' 21" (silver) Mark Cavendish (GBR) (HTC–Highroad) s.t. (bronze) José Joaquín Rojas (ESP) (Movistar Team) s.t.
    - General classification (after stage 10): (1) Thomas Voeckler (FRA) (Team Europcar) 42h 06' 32" (2) Luis León Sánchez (ESP) (Rabobank) + 1' 49" (3) Cadel Evans (AUS) (BMC Racing Team) + 2' 26"

==== Football (soccer) ====
- 2014 FIFA World Cup qualification (CONCACAF) First round, second leg (first leg scores in parentheses):
  - **Saint Lucia** 4–2 (2–4) Aruba. 6–6 on aggregate; Saint Lucia win 5–4 on penalties.
- Copa América in Argentina:
  - Group C (teams in **bold** advance to quarterfinals):
    - **Chile** 1–0 **Peru** in Mendoza
    - **Uruguay** 1–0 Mexico in La Plata
      - Final standings: Chile 7 points, Uruguay 5, Peru 4, Mexico 0.
- UEFA Champions League Second qualifying round, first leg:
  - Pyunik (Armenia) 0–4 (Czech Republic) Viktoria Plzeň
  - Valletta (Malta) 2–3 (Lithuania) Ekranas
  - Mogren (Montenegro) 1–2 (Bulgaria) Litex Lovech
  - Maribor (Slovenia) 2–0 (Luxembourg) F91 Dudelange
  - Slovan Bratislava (Slovakia) 2–0 (Kazakhstan) Tobol Kostanay
  - Shamrock Rovers (Republic of Ireland) 1–0 (Estonia) Flora Tallinn

==== Snooker ====
- World Cup in Bangkok, Thailand:
  - Group A:
    - Pakistan 2–3 Germany
    - Wales 5–0 Egypt
      - Standings: Wales 5 points (1 match), Germany, Pakistan 5 (2), Egypt 3 (2), Republic of Ireland 2 (1).
  - Group B:
    - Malta 2–3 Australia
    - Thailand 1 4–1 United Arab Emirates
      - Standings: Australia 7 points (2 matches), Thailand 1 5 (2), Malta 4 (2), China 3 (1), United Arab Emirates 1 (1).
  - Group C:
    - India 3–2 Belgium
    - England 4–1 Brazil
      - Standings: England, Northern Ireland 4 points (1 match), India, Brazil, Belgium 4 (2).
  - Group D:
    - Scotland 3–2 Poland
    - Afghanistan 2–3 Hong Kong
      - Standings: Poland, Hong Kong 5 points (2 matches), Afghanistan 4 (2), Scotland, Thailand 2 3 (1).

=== July 11, 2011 (Monday) ===
==== American football ====
- IFAF World Championship in Austria:
  - Group 2 in Graz:
    - France 10–35 Japan
    - Austria 14–36 Canada
      - Standings: Japan, Canada 2–0, Austria, France 0–2.

==== Baseball ====
- Major League Baseball Home Run Derby in Phoenix: New York Yankees second baseman Robinson Canó defeats Boston Red Sox first baseman Adrián González in the finals, 12–11, to win the event.

==== Cricket ====
- Tri-nation series in Scotland in Edinburgh: Ireland vs. Sri Lanka. **Match abandoned without a ball bowled.**

==== Football (soccer) ====
- Copa América in Argentina (team in **bold** advances to quarterfinals):
  - Group A in Córdoba: **Argentina** 3–0 Costa Rica
    - Final standings: **Colombia** 7 points, Argentina 5, Costa Rica 3, Bolivia 1.

==== Golf ====
- Women's majors:
  - U.S. Women's Open in Colorado Springs, Colorado:
    - Leaderboard after final round: (T1) Hee Kyung Seo (KOR) & So Yeon Ryu (KOR) 281 (−3) (3) Cristie Kerr (USA) 283 (−1)
    - 3 holes playoff: Ryu 10 (−2) def. Seo 13 (+1)
      - Ryu wins her first major title.

==== Snooker ====
- World Cup in Bangkok, Thailand:
  - Group A:
    - Pakistan 3–2 Republic of Ireland
    - Egypt 3–2 Germany
  - Group B:
    - Thailand 1 1–4 Australia
    - China 3–2 Malta
  - Group C:
    - Brazil 3–2 Belgium
    - India 1–4 Northern Ireland
  - Group D:
    - Thailand 2 3–2 Afghanistan
    - Hong Kong 2–3 Poland

=== July 10, 2011 (Sunday) ===
==== American football ====
- IFAF World Championship in Austria:
  - Group 1 in Innsbruck:
    - Australia 0–65 Mexico
    - United States 48–7 Germany
      - Standings: United States, Mexico 2–0, Germany, Australia 0–2.

==== Archery ====
- World Championships in Turin, Italy:
  - Men's individual recurve: (gold) Kim Woojin (KOR) (silver) Oh Jin-Hyek (KOR) (bronze) Brady Ellison (USA)
  - Women's individual recurve: (gold) Denissé van Lamoen (CHI) (silver) Kristine Esebua (GEO) (bronze) Fang Yuting (CHN)
  - Men's team recurve: (gold) South Korea (Oh, Kim, Im Dong-Hyun) (silver) France (Gaël Prévost, Jean-Charles Valladont, Romain Girouille) (bronze) Italy (Michele Frangilli, Marco Galiazzo, Mauro Nespoli)
  - Women's team recurve: (gold) Italy (Natalia Valeeva, Guendalina Sartori, Jessica Tomasi) (silver) India (Deepika Kumari, Bombayala Devi, Chekrovolu Swuro) (bronze) South Korea (Han Gyeonghee, Jung Dasomi, Ki Bo-Bee)
  - Mixed team recurve: (gold) South Korea (Im, Ki Bo-Bae) (silver) Mexico (Juan René Serrano, Aída Román) (bronze) Great Britain (Laurence Godfrey, Amy Oliver)

==== Athletics ====
- Samsung Diamond League:
  - Aviva Birmingham Grand Prix in Birmingham, United Kingdom:
    - Men:
      - 100m: Asafa Powell (JAM) 9.91
      - 400m hurdles: Dai Greene (GBR) 48.20
      - 800m: Abubaker Kaki Khamis (SUD) 1:44.54
      - 5000m: Mo Farah (GBR) 13:06.14
      - Triple jump: Phillips Idowu (GBR) 17.54m
      - Shot put: Dylan Armstrong (CAN) 21.55m
      - Javelin throw: Andreas Thorkildsen (NOR) 88.30m
    - Women:
      - 100m hurdles: Sally Pearson (AUS) 12.48
      - 200m: Bianca Knight (USA) 22.59
      - 400m: Amantle Montsho (BOT) 50.20
      - 800m: Jenny Meadows (GBR) 2:02.06
      - 1500m: Morgan Uceny (USA) 4:05.64
      - 3000m steeplechase: Sofia Assefa (ETH) 9:25.87
      - Long jump: Janay DeLoach (USA) 6.78m
      - High jump: Blanka Vlašić (CRO) 1.99m
      - Pole vault: Silke Spiegelburg (GER) 4.66m
      - Discus throw: Nadine Müller (GER) 65.75m
- World Youth Championships in Lille Métropole, France:
  - Boys' 200m: (gold) Stephen Newbold (BAH) 20.89 (silver) Odail Todd (JAM) 21.00 (bronze) Ronald Darby (USA) 21.08
  - Boys' 1500m: (gold) Teshome Dirirsa (ETH) 3:39.13 (silver) Vincent Mutai (KEN) 3:39.17 (bronze) Jonathan Kiplimo (KEN) 3:39.54
  - Boys' 3000m: (gold) William Malel Sitonik (KEN) 7:40.10 (silver) Patrick Mutunga Mwikya (KEN) 7:40.47 (bronze) Abrar Osman Adem (ERI) 7:40.89
  - Boys' medley relay: (gold) United States (Darby, Aldrich Bailey, Najee Glass, Arman Hall) 1:49.47 (silver) Japan (Kazuma Oseto, Akiyuki Hashimoto, Shotaro Aikyo, Takuya Fukunaga) 1:50.69 (bronze) France (Wilhem Belocian, Mickaël Zézé, Jordan Geenen, Thomas Jordier) 1:51.81
  - Boys' javelin throw: (gold) Reinhard van Zyl (RSA) 82.96m (silver) Morné Moolman (RSA) 80.99m (bronze) Guisheng Zhang (CHN) 77.62m
  - Boys' pole vault: (gold) Robert Renner (SLO) 5.25m (silver) Melker Svärd Jacobsson (SWE) 5.15m (bronze) Jacob Blankenship (USA) 5.05m
  - Girls' 200m: (gold) Desirèe Henry (GBR) 23.25 (silver) Christian Brennan (CAN) 23.47 (bronze) Shericka Jackson (JAM) 23.62
  - Girls' 800m: (gold) Ajee' Wilson (USA) 2:02.64 (silver) Chunyu Wang (CHN) 2:03.23 (bronze) Jessica Judd (GBR) 2:03.43
  - Girls' 2000m steeplechase: (gold) Norah Jeruto Tanui (KEN) 6:16.41 (silver) Fadwa Sidi Madane (MAR) 6:20.98 (bronze) Lilian Jepkorir Chemweno (KEN) 6:21.85
  - Girls' medley relay: (gold) Jamaica (Christania Williams, Jackson, Chrisann Gordon, Olivia James) 2:03.42 (silver) United States (Jennifer Madu, Bealoved Brown, Kendall Baisden, Robin Reynolds) 2:03.92 (bronze) Canada (Shamelle Pless, Khamica Bingham, Brennan, Sage Watson) 2:05.72
  - Girls' long jump: (gold) Chanice Porter (JAM) 6.22m (silver) Anastassia Angioi (ITA) 6.17m (bronze) Marina Buchelnikova (RUS) 6.11m
- Asian Championships in Kobe, Japan:
  - Men's 110m hurdles: (gold) Liu Xiang (CHN) 13.22 (silver) Shi Dongpeng (CHN) 13.56 (bronze) Park Tae-Kyong (KOR) 13.66
  - Men's 200m: (gold) Femi Seun Ogunode (QAT) 20.41 (silver) Hitoshi Saito (JPN) 20.75 (bronze) Omar Jouma Al-Salfa (UAE) 20.97
  - Men's 4 × 100 m relay: (gold) Japan (Sota Kawatsura, Masashi Eriguchi, Shinji Takahira, Saito) 39.18 (silver) Hong Kong (Tang Yik Chun, Lai Chun Ho, Ng Ka Fung, Chi Ho Tsui) 39.26 (bronze) Chinese Taipei (Wang Wen-Tang, Liu Yuan-Kai, Tsai Meng-Lin, Yi Wei-Che) 39.30
  - Men's 800m: (gold) Mohammad Al-Azemi (KUW) 1:46.14 (silver) Sajjad Moradi (IRN) 1:46.35 (bronze) Ghamnda Ram (IND) 1:46.46
  - Men's 4 × 400 m relay: (gold) Japan (Yusuke Ishitsuka, Kei Takase, Hideyuki Hirose, Yuzo Kanemaru) 3:04.72 (silver) Saudi Arabia (Mohammed Ali Albishi, Hamed Al-Bishi, Y. I. Alhezam, Yousef Ahmed Masrahi) 3:08.03 (bronze) Iran (Peyman Rajabi, A. Ghelichizokhanou, Ehsan Mohajer Shojaei, Sajjad Hashemiahangari) 3:08.58
  - Men's long jump: (gold) Su Xiongfeng (CHN) 8.19m (silver) Supanara Sukhasvasti (THA) 8.05m (bronze) Rikiya Saruyama (JPN) 8.05m
  - Men's javelin throw: (gold) Yukifumi Murakami (JPN) 83.27m (silver) Park Jae-Myong (KOR) 80.19m (bronze) Ivan Zaitcev (UZB) 79.22m
  - Women's 100m hurdles: (gold) Sun Yawei (CHN) 13.04 (silver) Jung Hye-Lim (KOR) 13.11 (bronze) Natalya Ivoninskaya (KAZ) 13.15
  - Women's 200m: (gold) Chisato Fukushima (JPN) 23.49 (silver) Gretta Taslakian (LIB) 24.01 (bronze) Saori Imai (JPN) 24.06
  - Women's 4 × 100 m relay: (gold) Japan (Nao Okabe, Momoko Takahashi, Fukushima, Saori Imai) 44.05 (silver) China (Tao Yujia, Liang Qiuping, Jiang Lan, Wei Yongli) 44.23 (bronze) Thailand (Phatsorn Jaksuninkorn, Orranut Klomdee, Laphassaporn Tawoncharoen, Nongnuch Sanrat) 44.62
  - Women's 800m: (gold) Truong Thanh Hang (VIE) 2:01.41 (silver) Margarita Matsko (KAZ) 2:02.46 (bronze) Tintu Luka (IND) 2:02.55
  - Women's 4 × 400 m relay: (gold) Japan (Sayaka Aoki, Chisato Tanaka, Satomi Kubokura, Miho Shingu) 3:35.00 (silver) Kazakhstan (Tatyana Roslanova, Matsko, Alexandra Kuzina, Olga Tereshkova) 3:36.61 (bronze) Iraq (Alaa Al-Qaysi, Inam Al Sudani, Gulustan Ieso, Danah Abdulrazzaq) 3:41.91
  - Women's 3000m steeplechase: (gold) Minori Hayakari (JPN) 9:52.42 (silver) Sudha Singh (IND) 10:08.52 (bronze) Thi Phuong Nguyen (VIE) 10:14.94
  - Women's high jump: (gold) Zheng Xingjuan (CHN) 1.92m (silver) Svetlana Radzivil (UZB) 1.92m (bronze) Marina Aitova (KAZ) 1.89m
  - Women's shot put: (gold) Meng Qianqian (CHN) 18.31m (silver) Liu Xiangrong (CHN) 18.30m (bronze) Leila Rajabi (IRI) 16.60m

==== Auto racing ====
- Formula One:
  - British Grand Prix in Silverstone, Great Britain: (1) Fernando Alonso (ESP) (Ferrari) (2) Sebastian Vettel (GER) (Red Bull–Renault) (3) Mark Webber (AUS) (Red Bull-Renault)
    - Drivers' championship standings (after 9 of 19 races): (1) Vettel 204 points (2) Webber 124 (3) Alonso 112
- IndyCar Series:
  - Honda Indy Toronto in Toronto: (1) Dario Franchitti (GBR) (Chip Ganassi Racing) (2) Scott Dixon (NZL) (Chip Ganassi Racing) (3) Ryan Hunter-Reay (USA) (Andretti Autosport)
    - Drivers' championship standings (after 10 of 18 races): (1) Franchitti 353 points (2) Will Power (AUS) (Team Penske) 298 (3) Dixon 270
- V8 Supercars:
  - Sucrogen Townsville 400 in Townsville, Queensland:
    - Race 15: (1) Jamie Whincup (AUS) (Triple Eight Race Engineering; Holden VE Commodore) (2) Craig Lowndes (AUS) (Triple Eight Race Engineering; Holden VE Commodore) (3) Mark Winterbottom (AUS) (Ford Performance Racing; Ford FG Falcon)
      - Drivers' championship standings (after 15 of 28 races): (1) Whincup 1683 points (2) Lowndes 1497 (3) Shane van Gisbergen (NZL) (Stone Brothers Racing; Ford FG Falcon) 1317

==== Baseball ====
- All-Star Futures Game in Phoenix: U.S. Futures 6, World Futures 4.
  - U.S. win the game for the second successive year and the seventh time overall. Oakland Athletics shortstop Grant Green is named game MVP.

==== Basketball ====
- FIBA Under-19 World Championship in Riga, Latvia:
  - Bronze medal game: Argentina 72–77 (bronze) **Russia**
  - Final: (silver) Serbia 67–85 (gold) **Lithuania**
    - Lithuania win the title for the first time.

==== Cricket ====
- India in the West Indies:
  - 3rd Test in Roseau, Dominica; day 5: West Indies 204 & 322 (131.3 overs; Shivnarine Chanderpaul 116*); India 347 & 94/3 (32 overs). **Match drawn; India win 3-match series 1–0.**

==== Cycling ====
- Grand Tours:
  - Tour de France, Stage 9: (gold) Luis León Sánchez (ESP) (Rabobank) 5h 27' 09" (silver) Thomas Voeckler (FRA) (Team Europcar) + 5" (bronze) Sandy Casar (FRA) (FDJ) + 13"
    - General classification (after stage 9): (1) Voeckler 38h 35' 11" (2) Sánchez + 1' 49" (3) Cadel Evans (AUS) (BMC Racing Team) + 2' 26"

==== Equestrianism ====
- Falsterbo Horse Show in Skanör med Falsterbo, Sweden:
  - Show jumping – Grand Prix (CSIO 5*): (gold) Patrice Delaveau (FRA) on Orient Express (silver) Angelica Augustsson (SWE) on Mic Mac du Tillard (bronze) Maikel van der Vleuten (NED) on Verdi
- CHIO Aachen in Aachen, Germany:
  - Show jumping – Olympic Qualification for Central and Eastern Europe, Asia and Oceania (CSI 2*):
    - Best team: Ukraine (Cassio Rivetti, Björn Nagel, Oleg Krasyuk, Katharina Offel)
    - Best South East Asia or Oceania competitor: Taizo Sugitani (JPN)
  - Vaulting – Nations Cup of Germany (combined competition): (gold) Germany I (Pia Engelberty, Jannik Heiland, RSV Neuss Grimlinghausen) (silver) Germany II (bronze) Austria

==== Football (soccer) ====
- FIFA Women's World Cup in Germany:
  - Quarterfinals:
    - **Sweden** 3–1 Australia in Augsburg
      - Sweden qualify for the 2012 Olympic Tournament.
    - Brazil 2–2 (3–5 pen.) **United States** in Dresden
      - The United States advance to the semifinals for the sixth successive time.
- 2014 FIFA World Cup qualification (CONCACAF) First round, second leg (first leg score in parentheses):
  - British Virgin Islands 1–2 (0–2) **U.S. Virgin Islands**. U.S. Virgin Islands win 4–1 on aggregate.
  - **Dominican Republic** 4–0 (2–0) Anguilla. Dominican Republic win 6–0 on aggregate.
- FIFA U-17 World Cup in Mexico City, Mexico:
  - Third-place match: Brazil 3–4 (bronze) **Germany**
  - Final: (silver) Uruguay 0–2 (gold) **Mexico**
    - Mexico win the title for the second time.
- Copa América in Argentina (team in **bold** advances to quarterfinals):
  - Group A in Santa Fe: **Colombia** 2–0 Bolivia
    - Standings: Colombia 7 points (3 matches), Costa Rica 3 (2), Argentina 2 (2), Bolivia 1 (3).
- International friendly:
  - South Sudan 1–3 (Kenya) Tusker
    - South Sudan plays its first football fixture during its independence celebration.

==== Golf ====
- Women's majors:
  - U.S. Women's Open in Colorado Springs, Colorado:
    - Leaderboard after third round (USA unless indicated): (T1) Cristie Kerr, So Yeon Ryu (KOR) & Angela Stanford 212 (−1)
    - Leaderboard after fourth day: (1) Hee Kyung Seo (KOR) 281 (−3) (2) Ryu −2 after 69 holes (3) Kerr −1 after 70 holes
      - 30 players will complete their rounds tomorrow.
- PGA Tour:
  - John Deere Classic in Silvis, Illinois:
    - Winner: Steve Stricker (USA) 262 (−22)
      - Stricker wins the tournament for the third consecutive year, for his eleventh PGA Tour title.
- European Tour:
  - Barclays Scottish Open in Inverness, Scotland:
    - Winner: Luke Donald (ENG) 197 (−19)
      - Donald wins his third European Tour title of the season and sixth of his career.
- Champions Tour:
  - Nature Valley First Tee Open at Pebble Beach in Pebble Beach, California:
    - Winner: Jeff Sluman (USA) 206 (−10)
      - Sluman wins the tournament for the third time in four years, for his fourth Champions Tour title.

==== Motorcycle racing ====
- Superbike:
  - Brno World Championship round in Brno, Czech Republic:
    - Race 1: (1) Marco Melandri (ITA) (Yamaha YZF-R1) (2) Max Biaggi (ITA) (Aprilia RSV4) (3) Carlos Checa (ESP) (Ducati 1098R)
    - Race 2: (1) Biaggi (2) Melandri (3) Checa
      - Riders' championship standings (after 8 of 13 rounds): (1) Checa 293 points (2) Biaggi 263 (3) Melandri 240
- Supersport:
  - Brno World Championship round in Brno, Czech Republic: (1) Gino Rea (GBR) (Honda CBR600RR) (2) Fabien Foret (FRA) (Honda CBR600RR) (3) Chaz Davies (GBR) (Yamaha YZF-R6)
    - Riders' championship standings (after 7 of 12 rounds): (1) Davies 121 points (2) Broc Parkes (AUS) (Kawasaki Ninja ZX-6R) & Foret 85

==== Netball ====
- World Championships in Singapore:
  - Bronze medal match: (bronze) **England** 70–49 Jamaica
  - Gold medal match: (silver) New Zealand 57–58 (gold) **Australia**
    - Australia win the title for the second successive time and tenth time overall.

==== Snooker ====
- Wuxi Classic in Wuxi, China:
  - Final: Ali Carter (ENG) 7–9 **Mark Selby** (ENG)
    - Selby wins his fifth professional title.

==== Tennis ====
- Davis Cup World Group Quarterfinals:
  - Sweden 1–4 **Serbia**
    - Janko Tipsarević (SRB) def. Michael Ryderstedt (SWE) 6–2, 7–5, 6–3
    - Viktor Troicki (SRB) def. Robert Lindstedt (SWE) 3–6, 6–4 retired
  - United States 1–3 **Spain**
    - David Ferrer (ESP) def. Mardy Fish (USA) 7–5, 7–6(3), 5–7, 7–6(5)
  - Germany 1–4 **France**
    - Philipp Petzschner (GER) def. Michaël Llodra (FRA) 6–3, 6–4
    - Jo-Wilfried Tsonga (FRA) def. Philipp Kohlschreiber (GER) 7–6(3), 7–6(5)
- ATP World Tour:
  - Campbell's Hall of Fame Tennis Championships in Newport, United States:
    - Final: **John Isner** (USA) def. Olivier Rochus (BEL) 6–3, 7–6(6)
      - Isner wins his second career title.
- WTA Tour:
  - Poli-Farbe Grand Prix in Budapest, Hungary:
    - Final: **Roberta Vinci** (ITA) def. Irina-Camelia Begu (ROU) 6–4, 1–6, 6–4
      - Vinci wins her third title of the year and sixth of her career.

==== Volleyball ====
- FIVB World League Final four in Gdańsk and Sopot, Poland:
  - Bronze medal match: Argentina 0–3 (bronze) **Poland**
  - Final: (silver) Brazil 2–3 (gold) **Russia**
    - Russia win the title for the second time.
- Men's European League, Leg 6 (teams in **bold** advance to final four):
  - Pool A:
    - **Slovenia** 0–3 Belgium
    - Croatia 3–2 Great Britain
      - Final standings: Slovenia 26 points, Belgium 18, Croatia 16, Great Britain 12.
  - Pool B:
    - Netherlands 0–3 **Spain**
    - Greece 0–3 Austria
      - Final standings: Spain 30 points, Netherlands 24, Greece 11, Austria 7.
  - Pool C: **Slovakia** 3–2 Turkey
    - Final standings: **Romania** 24 points, Slovakia 23, Belarus 17, Turkey 8.
- Women's European League, Leg 6 (teams in **bold** advance to final four):
  - Pool A: Greece 0–3 **Serbia**
    - Final standings: Serbia 35 points, France 21, Spain 14, Greece 2.

=== July 9, 2011 (Saturday) ===
==== American football ====
- IFAF World Championship in Austria:
  - Group 2 in Graz:
    - Japan 24–6 Austria
    - Canada 45–10 France

==== Archery ====
- World Championships in Turin, Italy:
  - Men's individual compound: (gold) Christopher Perkins (CAN) (silver) Jesse Broadwater (USA) (bronze) Reo Wilde (USA)
  - Women's individual compound: (gold) Albina Loginova (RUS) (silver) Pascale Lebecque (FRA) (bronze) Erika Anschutz (USA)
  - Men's team compound: (gold) United States (Broadwater, Braden Gellenthien, Wilde) (silver) Denmark (Martin Damsbo, Torben Johannessen, Patrick Laursen) (bronze) Canada (Perkins, Simon Rousseau, Dietmar Trillus)
  - Women's team compound: (gold) United States (Anschutz, Christie Colin, Jamie Van Natta), (silver) Iran (Vida Halimian, Mahtab Parsamehr, Shabnam Sarlak) (bronze) Venezuela (Olga Bosh, Luzmary Guédez, Ana Mendoza)
  - Mixed team compound: (gold) Italy (Sergio Pagni, Marcella Tonioli) (silver) Netherlands (Peter Elzinga, Inge van Caspel) (bronze) South Korea (Choi Yong-Hee, Seok Ji-Hyun)

==== Athletics ====
- World Youth Championships in Lille Métropole, France:
  - Boys' 400m hurdles: (gold) Egor Kuznetsov (RUS) 50.97 (silver) Ibrahim Mohammed Saleh (KSA) 51.14 (bronze) Takahiro Matsumoto (JPN) 51.26
  - Boys' 800m: (gold) Leonard Kirwa Kosencha (KEN) 1:44.08 (silver) Mohammed Aman (ETH) 1:44.68 (bronze) Timothy Kitum (KEN) 1:44.98
  - Boys' 10,000m walk: (gold) Pavel Parshin (RUS) 40:51.31 (silver) Kenny Martín Pérez (COL) 40:59.25 (bronze) Erwin González (MEX) 41:09.60
  - Boys' triple jump: (gold) Latario Collie-Minns (BAH) 16.06m (silver) Albert Janki (RSA) 15.95m (bronze) Lathone Collie-Minns (BAH) 15.51m
  - Boys' high jump: (gold) Gaël Levécque (FRA) 2.13m (silver) Usman Usmanov (RUS) 2.13m (bronze) Justin Fondren (USA) 2.13m
  - Girls' 400m hurdles: (gold) Nnenya Hailey (USA) 57.93 (silver) Sarah Carli (AUS) 58.05 (bronze) Surian Hechavarría (CUB) 58.37
  - Girls' 1500m: (gold) Faith Chepngetich Kipyegon (KEN) 4:09.48 (silver) Senbere Teferi (ETH) 4:10.54 (bronze) Genet Tibieso (ETH) 4:11.56
  - Girls' pole vault: (gold) Desiree Singh (GER) 4.25m (silver) Liz Parnov (AUS) 4.20m (bronze) Lucy Bryan (GBR) 4.10m
  - Girls' discus throw: (gold) Rosalía Vázquez (CUB) 53.51m (silver) Yan Liang (CHN) 52.89m (bronze) Shelbi Vaughan (USA) 52.58m
  - Girls' hammer throw: (gold) Louisa James (GBR) 57.13m (silver) Malwina Kopron (POL) 57.03m (bronze) Roxana Perie (ROM) 56.75m
  - Girls' heptathlon: (gold) Yusleidys Mendieta (CUB) 5697 points (silver) Yorgelis Rodríguez (CUB) 5671 (bronze) Marjolein Lindemans (BEL) 5532
- Asian Championships in Kobe, Japan:
  - Men's 400m hurdles: (gold) Takatoshi Abe (JPN) 49.64 (silver) Yuta Imazeki (JPN) 50.22 (bronze) Chieh Chen (TPE) 50.39
  - Men's 5000m: (gold) Dejenee Mootumaa (BHR) 13:40.78 (silver) Yuki Sato (JPN) 13:41.93 (bronze) Alemu Bekele Gebre (BHR) 13:48.81
  - Men's high jump: (gold) Mutaz Essa Barshim (QAT) 2.35m (silver) Majd Eddin Ghazal (SYR) 2.28m (bronze) Wang Chen (CHN) 2.26m
  - Men's shot put: (gold) Chang Ming-Huang (TPE) 20.14m (silver) Zhang Jun (CHN) 19.77m (bronze) Om Prakash Karhana (IND) 19.47m
  - Women's 400m hurdles: (gold) Satomi Kubokura (JPN) 56.52 (silver) Qi Yang (CHN) 56.69 (bronze) Christine Merrill (SRI) 57.30
  - Women's 5000m: (gold) Tejitu Daba Chalchissa (BHR) 15:22.48 (silver) Hitomi Niiya (JPN) 15:34.19 (bronze) (bronze) Yuriko Kobayashi (JPN) 15:42.59
  - Women's pole vault: (gold) Wu Sha (CHN) 4.35m (silver) Li Ling (CHN) 4.30m (bronze) Choi Yun-hee (KOR) 4.00m
  - Women's triple jump: (gold) Xie Limei (CHN) 14.58m (silver) Valeriya Kanatova (UZB) 14.14m (bronze) Mayookha Johny (IND) 14.11m
  - Women's heptathlon: (gold) Wassana Winatho (THA) 5710 points (silver) Humie Takehara (JPN) 5491 (bronze) Chie Kiriyama (JPN) 5442

==== Auto racing ====
- Sprint Cup Series:
  - Quaker State 400 in Sparta, Kentucky: (1) (Nevada) Kyle Busch (Toyota; Joe Gibbs Racing) (2) (Florida) David Reutimann (Toyota; Michael Waltrip Racing) (3) (California) Jimmie Johnson (Chevrolet; Hendrick Motorsports)
    - Drivers' championship standings (after 18 of 36 races): (1) Busch 624 points (2) (Missouri) Carl Edwards (Ford; Roush Fenway Racing) 620 (3) (California) Kevin Harvick (Chevrolet; Richard Childress Racing) 614
- V8 Supercars:
  - Sucrogen Townsville 400 in Townsville, Queensland:
    - Race 14: (1) Garth Tander (AUS) (Holden Racing Team; Holden VE Commodore) (2) Jamie Whincup (AUS) (Triple Eight Race Engineering; Holden VE Commodore) (3) Will Davison (AUS) (Ford Performance Racing; Ford FG Falcon)
      - Drivers' championship standings (after 14 of 28 races): (1) Whincup 1533 points (2) Craig Lowndes (AUS) (Triple Eight Race Engineering; Holden VE Commodore) 1359 (3) Shane van Gisbergen (NZL) (Stone Brothers Racing; Ford FG Falcon) 1206

==== Baseball ====
- Derek Jeter becomes the 28th player in Major League Baseball history with 3,000 career hits, and the first to reach the mark with the New York Yankees. He entered the club with a home run off David Price in the third inning of the Yankees' game against the Tampa Bay Rays.

==== Beach handball ====
- European Championship in Umag, Croatia:
  - Men's:
    - 3rd place game: Ukraine 1–2 (bronze) **Spain**
    - Final: (gold) **Croatia** 2–0 (silver) Russia
      - Croatia win the title for the second successive time.
  - Women's:
    - 3rd place game: (bronze) **Italy** 2–1 Norway
    - Final: (silver) Denmark 1–2 (gold) **Croatia**
      - Croatia win the title for the second time.

==== Cricket ====
- India in the West Indies:
  - 3rd Test in Roseau, Dominica; day 4: West Indies 204 & 224/6 (83 overs; Kirk Edwards 110); India 347 (108.2 overs; Fidel Edwards 5/103). West Indies lead by 81 runs with 4 wickets remaining.
- Sri Lanka in England:
  - 5th ODI in Manchester: England 268/9 (50 overs; Suraj Randiv 5/42); Sri Lanka 252 (48.2 overs). **England win by 16 runs; win 5-match series 3–2.**

==== Cycling ====
- Grand Tours:
  - Tour de France, Stage 8: (gold) Rui Costa (POR) (Movistar Team) 4h 36' 46" (silver) Philippe Gilbert (BEL) (Omega Pharma–Lotto) + 12" (bronze) Cadel Evans (AUS) (BMC Racing Team) + 15"
    - General classification (after stage 8): (1) Thor Hushovd (NOR) (Garmin–Cervélo) 33h 06' 28" (2) Evans + 1" (3) Fränk Schleck (LUX) (Leopard Trek) + 4"

==== Equestrianism ====
- Falsterbo Horse Show in Skanör med Falsterbo, Sweden:
  - Dressage – World Dressage Masters (CDI 5*):
    - Grand Prix Freestyle (A-Final): (gold) Patrik Kittel (SWE) on Scandic (silver) Anky van Grunsven (NED) on Salinero (bronze) Tinne Vilhelmson-Silfven (SWE) on Don Auriello
    - Grand Prix Spécial (B-Final): (gold) Michal Rapcewicz (POL) on Randon (silver) Jenny Schreven (NED) on Krawall (bronze) Siril Helljesen (NOR) on Dorina
  - Show jumping – Falsterbo Derby (CSIO 5*): (gold) Patrice Delaveau (FRA) on Ornella Mail (silver) Shane Breen (IRL) on Gold Rain (bronze) Erika Lickhammer (SWE) on Hip Hop

==== Football (soccer) ====
- FIFA Women's World Cup in Germany:
  - Quarterfinals:
    - England 1–1 (3–4 pen.) **France** in Leverkusen
      - France qualify for the 2012 Olympic Tournament.
    - Germany 0–1 (a.e.t.) **Japan** in Wolfsburg
      - Two times defending champion Germany suffer their first defeat after 15 World Cup matches.
- 2014 FIFA World Cup qualification (CONCACAF) First round, second leg (first leg score in parentheses):
  - **Bahamas** 6–0 (4–0) Turks and Caicos Islands. Bahamas win 10–0 on aggregate.
- Copa América in Argentina:
  - Group B:
    - Brazil 2–2 Paraguay in Córdoba
    - Venezuela 1–0 Ecuador in Salta
      - Standings (after 2 matches): Venezuela 4 points, Brazil, Paraguay 2, Ecuador 1.

==== Golf ====
- Women's majors:
  - U.S. Women's Open in Colorado Springs, Colorado:
    - Leaderboard after second round and after third day: (1) Mika Miyazato (JPN) 137 (−5) (2) Ai Miyazato (JPN) 138 (−4) (3) I.K. Kim (KOR) 139 (−3)
      - With only 19 of the 72 players who made the cut having begun their third round, the USGA will attempt to complete the tournament with two rounds on Sunday.

==== Rugby union ====
- Super Rugby Final in Brisbane: **Reds** (Australia) 18–13 (New Zealand) Crusaders
  - The Reds win their first championship in the competition's professional era, and for the third time including their 1994 and 1995 titles in the amateur Super 10.
- IRB Pacific Nations Cup, round 2 in Suva, Fiji:
  - Japan 28–27 Tonga
  - Fiji 36–18 Samoa
    - Standings (after 2 games): Tonga 6 points, Samoa, Fiji, Japan 5.

==== Snooker ====
- Wuxi Classic in Wuxi, China, semi-finals:
  - Shaun Murphy (ENG) 3–6 **Ali Carter** (ENG)
  - Ding Junhui (CHN) 5–6 **Mark Selby** (ENG)

==== Tennis ====
- Davis Cup World Group Quarterfinals:
  - Sweden 1–2 Serbia
    - Simon Aspelin/Robert Lindstedt (SWE) def. Novak Djokovic/Nenad Zimonjić (SRB) 6–4, 7–6(5), 7–5
  - **Argentina** 5–0 Kazakhstan
    - Juan Ignacio Chela (ARG) def. Evgeny Korolev (KAZ) 2–6, 6–2, 6–0
    - Juan Mónaco (ARG) def. Mikhail Kukushkin (KAZ) 6–4, 6–1
  - United States 1–2 Spain
    - Bob Bryan/Mike Bryan (USA) def. Marcel Granollers/Fernando Verdasco (ESP) 6–7(3), 6–4, 6–4, 6–4
  - Germany 0–3 **France**
    - Michaël Llodra/Jo-Wilfried Tsonga (FRA) def. Christopher Kas/Philipp Petzschner (GER) 7–6(4), 6–4, 6–4
- WTA Tour:
  - Swedish Open in Båstad, Sweden:
    - Final: **Polona Hercog** (SLO) def. Johanna Larsson (SWE) 6–4, 7–5
      - Hercog wins her first career title.

==== Volleyball ====
- FIVB World League Final four in Gdańsk and Sopot, Poland:
  - Semifinals:
    - Argentina 0–3 **Brazil**
    - **Russia** 3–1 Poland
- Men's European League, Leg 6 (teams in **bold** advance to final four):
  - Pool A:
    - **Slovenia** 3–1 Belgium
    - Croatia 3–0 Great Britain
      - Standings (after 11 matches): Slovenia 26 points, Belgium 15, Croatia 14, Great Britain 11.
  - Pool B:
    - Netherlands 3–2 Spain
    - Greece 3–0 Austria
      - Standings (after 11 matches): Spain 27 points, Netherlands 24, Greece 11, Austria 4.
  - Pool C:
    - **Romania** 0–3 Belarus
    - **Slovakia** 3–0 Turkey
      - Standings: Romania 24 points (12 matches), Slovakia 21 (11), Belarus 17 (12), Turkey 7 (11).
- Women's European League, Leg 6 (teams in **bold** advance to final four):
  - Pool A:
    - Greece 0–3 **Serbia**
    - France 3–0 Spain
      - Standings: Serbia 32 points (11 matches), France 21 (12), Spain 14 (12), Greece 2 (11).
  - Pool B:
    - **Bulgaria** 3–1 **Czech Republic**
    - Hungary 3–2 Israel
      - Final standings: Bulgaria 29, Czech Republic 27, Hungary 10, Israel 6.
  - Pool C:
    - **Turkey** 3–0 Croatia
    - Romania 3–1 Belarus
      - Final standings: Turkey 30 points, Romania 22, Belarus 16, Croatia 4.
- Women's Pan-American Cup in Ciudad Juárez, Mexico:
  - Seventh place match: Peru 0–3 **Canada**
  - Fifth place match: Argentina 2–3 **Puerto Rico**
  - Bronze medal match: Cuba 0–3 (bronze) **United States**
  - Final: (gold) **Brazil** 3–0 (silver) Dominican Republic
    - Brazil win the Cup for the third time.

=== July 8, 2011 (Friday) ===
==== American football ====
- IFAF World Championship in Austria:
  - Group 1 in Innsbruck:
    - Australia 0–61 United States
    - Mexico 22–15 Germany

==== Athletics ====
- Samsung Diamond League:
  - Meeting Areva in Saint-Denis, France:
    - Men:
      - 200m: Usain Bolt (JAM) 20.03
      - 400m: Chris Brown (BAH) 44.94
      - 1500m: Amine Laâlou (MAR) 3:32.15
      - 110m hurdles: Dayron Robles (CUB) 13.09
      - 3000m steeplechase: Mahiedine Mekhissi-Benabbad (FRA) 8:02.09
      - Discus throw: Robert Harting (GER) 67.32m
      - High jump: Jaroslav Bába (CZE) & Aleksey Dmitrik (RUS) 2.32m
      - Long jump: Irving Saladino (PAN) 8.40m
      - Pole vault: Renaud Lavillenie (FRA) 5.73m
    - Women:
      - 100m: Kelly-Ann Baptiste (TRI) 10.91
      - 800m: Caster Semenya (RSA) 2:00.18
      - 5000m: Meseret Defar (ETH) 14:29.52
      - 400m hurdles: Zuzana Hejnová (CZE) 53.29
      - Javelin throw: Christina Obergföll (GER) 68.01m
      - Shot put: Valerie Adams (NZL) 20.78m
      - Triple jump: Yargelis Savigne (CUB) 14.99m
- World Youth Championships in Lille Métropole, France:
  - Boys' 2000m steeplechase: (gold) Conseslus Kipruto (KEN) 5:28.65 (silver) Gilbert Kirui (KEN) 5:30.49 (bronze) Zacharia Kiprotich (UGA) 5:37.98
  - Boys' hammer throw: (gold) Bence Pásztor (HUN) 82.60m (silver) Özkan Baltaci (TUR) 78.63m (bronze) Serhiy Reheda (UKR) 74.06m
  - Boys' 400m: (gold) Arman Hall (USA) 46.01 (silver) Alphas Leken Kishoyan (KEN) 46.58 (bronze) Patryk Dobek (POL) 46.67
  - Boys' 110m hurdles: (gold) Andries van der Merwe (RSA) 13.41 (silver) Joshua Hawkins (NZL) 13.44 (bronze) Wilhem Belocian (FRA) 13.51
  - Girls' high jump: (gold) Ligia Grozav (ROM) 1.87m (silver) Iryna Herashchenko (UKR) 1.87m (bronze) Chanice Porter (JAM) 1.82m
  - Girls' 5000m walk: (gold) Kate Veale (IRL) 21:45.59 (silver) Yanxue Mao (CHN) 22:00.15 (bronze) Nadezhda Leontyeva (RUS) 22:00.84
  - Girls' triple jump: (gold) Sokhna Galle (FRA) 13.62m (silver) Jingyu Li (CHN) 13.57m (bronze) Ana Peleteiro (ESP) 12.92m
  - Girls' 400m: (gold) Shaunae Miller (BAH) 51.84 (silver) Christian Brennan (CAN) 52.12 (bronze) Olivia James (JAM) 52.14
- Asian Championships in Kobe, Japan:
  - Men's 100m: (gold) Su Bingtian (CHN) 10.21 (silver) Masashi Eriguchi (JPN) 10.28 (bronze) Sota Kawatsura (JPN) 10.30
  - Men's 400m: (gold) Yousef Ahmed Masrahi (KSA) 45.79 (silver) Hideyuki Hirose (JPN) 46.03 (bronze) Yuzo Kanemaru (JPN) 46.38
  - Men's 1500m: (gold) Mohammad Al-Azemi (KUW) 3:42.49 (silver) Sajjad Moradi (IRI) 3:43.30 (bronze) Chaminda Wijekoon (SRI) 3:44.01
  - Men's 3000m steeplechase: (gold) Abubaker Ali Kamal (QAT) 8:30.23 (silver) Artem Kossinov (KAZ) 8:35.11 (bronze) Tareq Mubarak Taher (BHR) 8:45.47
  - Men's pole vault: (gold) Daichi Sawano (JPN) 5.50m (silver) Hiroki Ogita (JPN) 5.40m (bronze) Yang Yansheng (CHN) 5.40m
  - Men's triple jump: (gold) Yevgeniy Ektov (KAZ) 16.91m (silver) Li Yanxi (CHN) 16.70m (bronze) Roman Valiyev (KAZ) 16.62m
  - Men's decathlon: (gold) Hadi Sepehrzad (IRN) 7506 points, (silver) Akihiko Nakamura (JPN) 7478 (bronze) Bharatinder Singh (IND) 7358
  - Women's 100m: (gold) Guzel Khubbieva (UZB) 11.39 (silver) Wei Yongli (CHN) 11.70 (bronze) Tao Yujia (CHN) 11.74
  - Women's 400m: (gold) Olga Tereshkova (KAZ) 52.37 (silver) Gulustan Ieso (IRQ) 52.80 (bronze) Chen Jingwen (CHN) 52.89
  - Women's 1500m: (gold) Genzeb Shumi Regasa (BHR) 4:15.91 (silver) Truong Thanh Hang (VIE) 4:18.40 (bronze) O. P. Jaisha (IND) 4:21.41
  - Women's discus throw: (gold) Sun Taifeng (CHN) 60.89m (silver) Ma Xuejun (CHN) 59.67m (bronze) Harwant Kaur (IND) 57.99m

==== Auto racing ====
- Nationwide Series:
  - Feed the Children 300 in Sparta, Kentucky: (1) (Michigan) Brad Keselowski (Dodge; Penske Racing) (2) (California) Kevin Harvick (Chevrolet; Kevin Harvick Incorporated) (3) (Nevada) Kyle Busch (Toyota; Joe Gibbs Racing)
    - Drivers' championship standings (after 18 of 34 races): (1) (Virginia) Elliott Sadler (Chevrolet; Kevin Harvick Incorporated) 641 points (2) (Georgia (U.S. state)) Reed Sorenson (Chevrolet; Turner Motorsports) 637 (3) (Mississippi) Ricky Stenhouse Jr. (Ford; Roush Fenway Racing) 614

==== Cricket ====
- India in the West Indies:
  - 3rd Test in Roseau, Dominica; day 3: West Indies 204; India 308/6 (98 overs). India lead by 104 runs with 4 wickets remaining in the 1st innings.

==== Cycling ====
- Grand Tours:
  - Tour de France, Stage 7: (gold) Mark Cavendish (GBR) (HTC–Highroad) 5h 38' 53" (silver) Alessandro Petacchi (ITA) (Lampre–ISD) s.t. (bronze) André Greipel (GER) (Omega Pharma–Lotto) s.t.
    - General classification (after stage 7): (1) Thor Hushovd (NOR) (Garmin–Cervélo) 28h 29' 27" (2) Cadel Evans (AUS) (BMC Racing Team) + 1" (3) Fränk Schleck (LUX) (Leopard Trek) + 4"

==== Equestrianism ====
- FEI Nations Cup Show Jumping:
  - Nations Cup of Sweden in Skanör med Falsterbo (CSIO 5*): (gold) Germany (Marco Kutscher, Thomas Voß, Carsten-Otto Nagel, Ludger Beerbaum) (silver) France (Pénélope Leprevost, Simon Delestre, Kevin Staut, Michel Robert) & Sweden (Malin Baryard-Johnsson, Angelica Augustsson, Peder Fredricson, Rolf-Göran Bengtsson)
    - Standings (after 4 of 8 events): (1) Netherlands 29.5 points (2) Ireland 24 (3) Germany 21

==== Football (soccer) ====
- 2014 FIFA World Cup qualification (CONCACAF) First round, first leg:
  - Anguilla 0–2 Dominican Republic in San Cristóbal, Dominican Republic
  - Aruba 4–2 Saint Lucia
- Copa América in Argentina:
  - Group C in Mendoza:
    - Uruguay 1–1 Chile
    - Peru 1–0 Mexico
      - Standings (after 2 matches): Chile, Peru 4 points, Uruguay 2, Mexico 0.

==== Golf ====
- Women's majors:
  - U.S. Women's Open in Colorado Springs, Colorado:
    - Leaderboard after first round (all USA): (1) Stacy Lewis 68 (−3) (T2) Amy Anderson (a), Ryann O'Toole & Lizette Salas 69 (−2)
    - Leaderboard after second day (USA unless indicated): (1) I.K. Kim (KOR) −4 after 32 holes (T2) Anderson (a; after 18 holes), Lewis (after 34 holes) & Wendy Ward (after 33 holes) −2
      - Weather delays continue, with 66 players yet to begin their second round, and another 57 on the course. The second round resumes tomorrow.

==== Snooker ====
- Wuxi Classic in Wuxi, China, quarter-finals:
  - **Shaun Murphy** (ENG) 5–1 Peter Ebdon (ENG)
  - **Ali Carter** (ENG) 5–3 Yu Delu (CHN)
  - **Ding Junhui** (CHN) 5–4 Stephen Maguire (SCO)
  - **Mark Selby** (ENG) 5–0 Graeme Dott (SCO)

==== Tennis ====
- Davis Cup World Group Quarterfinals:
  - Sweden 0–2 Serbia
    - Viktor Troicki (SRB) def. Michael Ryderstedt (SWE) 6–3, 6–1, 6–7(6), 7–5
    - Janko Tipsarević (SRB) def. Ervin Eleskovic (SWE) 6–2, 1–0 retired
  - **Argentina** 3–0 Kazakhstan
    - Juan Ignacio Chela/Eduardo Schwank (ARG) def. Evgeny Korolev/Yuri Schukin (KAZ) 6–3, 6–2, 7–5
  - United States 0–2 Spain
    - Feliciano López (ESP) def. Mardy Fish (USA) 6–4, 3–6, 6–3, 6–7(2), 8–6
    - David Ferrer (ESP) def. Andy Roddick (USA) 7–6(9), 7–5, 6–3
  - Germany 0–2 France
    - Richard Gasquet (FRA) def. Florian Mayer (GER) 4–6, 4–6, 7–5, 6–3, 6–3
    - Gaël Monfils (FRA) def. Philipp Kohlschreiber (GER) 7–6(3), 7–6(5), 6–4

==== Volleyball ====
- FIVB World League Final round in Gdańsk and Sopot, Poland (teams in **bold** advance to final four):
  - Pool E:
    - Italy 0–3 Bulgaria
    - **Poland** 3–2 **Argentina**
      - Final standings: Argentina 7 points, Poland, Bulgaria 4, Italy 3.
  - Pool F:
    - United States 3–2 Cuba
    - **Brazil** 0–3 **Russia**
      - Final standings: Russia 9 points, Brazil 5, United States, Cuba 2.
- Men's European League, Leg 6 (teams in **bold** advance to final four):
  - Pool C: **Romania** 3–1 Belarus
    - Standings: Romania 24 points (11 matches), **Slovakia** 18 (10), Belarus 14 (11), Turkey 7 (10).
- Women's European League, Leg 6 (teams in **bold** advance to final four):
  - Pool A: France 3–2 Spain
    - Standings: **Serbia** 29 points (10 matches), France 18 (11), Spain 14 (11), Greece 2 (10).
  - Pool B:
    - **Bulgaria** 1–3 **Czech Republic**
    - Hungary 3–2 Israel
      - Standings (after 11 matches): Czech Republic 27 points, Bulgaria 26, Hungary 8, Israel 5.
  - Pool C:
    - **Turkey** 3–0 Croatia
    - Romania 3–2 Belarus
      - Standings (after 11 matches): Turkey 27 points, Romania 19, Belarus 16, Croatia 4.
- Women's Pan-American Cup in Ciudad Juárez, Mexico:
  - Ninth place match: Trinidad and Tobago 1–3 **Mexico**
  - Classification 5–8:
    - **Puerto Rico** 3–1 Canada
    - **Argentina** 3–2 Peru
  - Semifinals:
    - **Brazil** 3–1 Cuba
    - **Dominican Republic** 3–1 United States

=== July 7, 2011 (Thursday) ===
==== Athletics ====
- World Youth Championships in Lille Métropole, France:
  - Boys' 100m: (gold) Odail Todd (JAM) 10.51 (silver) Kazuma Oseto (JPN) 10.52 (bronze) Mickaël Zézé (FRA) 10.57
  - Boys' shot put: (gold) Jacko Gill (NZL) 24.35m (silver) Tyler Schultz (USA) 20.35m (bronze) Braheme Days Jr. (USA) 20.14m
  - Boys' long jump: (gold) Qing Lin (CHN) 7.83m (silver) Johan Taléus (SWE) 7.44m (bronze) Stefano Braga (ITA) 7.42m
  - Boys' octathlon: (gold) Jake Stein (AUS) 6491 points (silver) Fredrick Ekholm (SWE) 6127 (bronze) Felipe dos Santos (BRA) 5966
  - Girls' 100m: (gold) Jennifer Madu (USA) 11.57 (silver) Myasia Jacobs (USA) 11.61 (bronze) Christania Williams (JAM) 11.63
  - Girls' 100m hurdles: (gold) Trinity Wilson (USA) 13.11 (silver) Noemi Zbären (SUI) 13.17 (bronze) Kendell Williams (USA) 13.28
  - Girls' javelin throw: (gold) Christin Hussong (GER) 59.74m (silver) Sofi Flinck (SWE) 54.62m (bronze) Monique Cilione (AUS) 52.77m
- Asian Championships in Kobe, Japan:
  - Men's 10,000 metres: (gold) Ali Hasan Mahboob (BHR) 28:35.49 (silver) Bilisuma Shugi Gelassa (BHR) 28:36.30 (bronze) Akinobu Murasawa (JPN) 28:40.63
  - Men's discus throw: (gold) Ehsan Haddadi (IRI) 62.27m (silver) Vikas Gowda (IND) 61.58m (bronze) Wu Jian (CHN) 56.61
  - Women's 10,000 metres: (gold) Shitaye Eshete (BHR) 32:47.80 (silver) Kareema Saleh Jasim (BHR) 32:50.70 (bronze) Preeja Sreedharan (IND) 33:15.55
  - Women's long jump: (gold) Mayookha Johny (IND) 6.56m (silver) Lu Minjia (CHN) 6.52m (bronze) Saeko Okayama (JPN) 6.51m
  - Women's hammer throw: (gold) Masumi Aya (JPN) 67.19m (silver) Liu Tingting (CHN) 65.42m (bronze) Yuka Murofushi (JPN) 62.50m
  - Women's javelin throw: (gold) Liu Chunhua (CHN) 58.05m (silver) Wang Ping (CHN) 55.80m (bronze) Yuka Sato (JPN) 54.16m

==== Cricket ====
- India in the West Indies:
  - 3rd Test in Roseau, Dominica; day 2: West Indies 204 (76.3 overs; Ishant Sharma 5/77); India 8/0 (4 overs). India trail by 196 runs with 10 wickets remaining in the 1st innings.
    - India's Harbhajan Singh, with his dismissal of Carlton Baugh, becomes the eleventh bowler to claim 400 Test wickets.

==== Cycling ====
- Grand Tours:
  - Tour de France, Stage 6: (gold) Edvald Boasson Hagen (NOR) (Team Sky) 5h 13' 37" (silver) Matthew Goss (AUS) (HTC–Highroad) s.t. (bronze) Thor Hushovd (NOR) (Garmin–Cervélo) s.t.
    - General classification (after stage 6): (1) Hushovd 22h 50' 34" (2) Cadel Evans (AUS) (BMC Racing Team) + 1" (3) Fränk Schleck (LUX) (Leopard Trek) + 4"

==== Football (soccer) ====
- Copa América in Argentina:
  - Group A in Jujuy: Bolivia 0–2 Costa Rica
    - Standings (after 2 matches): Colombia 4 points, Costa Rica 3, Argentina 2, Bolivia 1.
- FIFA U-17 World Cup in Mexico:
  - Semifinals:
    - **Uruguay** 3–0 Brazil in Guadalajara
    - Germany 2–3 **Mexico** in Torreón
- UEFA Europa League First qualifying round, second leg (first leg scores in parentheses):
  - **Shakhter Karagandy** (Kazakhstan) 2–1 (1–1) (Slovenia) Koper. Shakhter Karagandy win 3–2 on aggregate.
  - **Metalurgist Rustavi** (Georgia (country)) 1–1 (1–0) (Armenia) Banants. Metalurgist Rustavi win 2–1 on aggregate.
  - **Irtysh Pavlodar** (Kazakhstan) 2–0 (0–1) (Poland) Jagiellonia Białystok. Irtysh Pavlodar win 2–1 on aggregate.
  - Ulisses (Armenia) 0–2 (0–3) (Hungary) **Ferencváros**. Ferencváros win 5–0 on aggregate.
  - **Flamurtari Vlorë** (Albania) 1–2 (3–1) (Montenegro) Budućnost Podgorica. Flamurtari Vlorë win 4–3 on aggregate.
  - Milsami Orhei (Moldova) 1–3 (0–2) (Georgia (country)) **Dinamo Tbilisi**. Dinamo Tbilisi win 5–1 on aggregate.
  - Zeta (Montenegro) 2–1 (0–3) (Slovakia) **Spartak Trnava**. Spartak Trnava win 4–2 on aggregate.
  - **Qarabağ** (Azerbaijan) 3–0 (4–0) (Lithuania) Banga Gargždai. Qarabağ win 7–0 on aggregate.
  - Fola Esch (Luxembourg) 1–1 (0–4) (Sweden) **Elfsborg**. Elfsborg win 5–1 on aggregate.
  - Nõmme Kalju (Estonia) 0–2 (0–0) (Finland) **Honka**. Honka win 2–0 on aggregate.
  - Lusitanos (Andorra) 0–1 (1–5) (Croatia) **Varaždin**. Varaždin win 6–1 on aggregate.
  - **Tromsø** (Norway) 2–1 (5–0) (Latvia) Daugava Daugavpils. Tromsø win 7–1 on aggregate.
  - **Häcken** (Sweden) 5–1 (1–1) (Luxembourg) Käerjéng 97. Häcken win 6–2 on aggregate.
  - **Vllaznia Shkodër** (Albania) 1–1 (1–0) (Malta) Birkirkara. Vllaznia Shkodër win 2–1 on aggregate.
  - **Minsk** (Belarus) 2–1 (1–1) (Azerbaijan) AZAL Baku. Minsk win 3–2 on aggregate.
  - NSÍ Runavík (Faroe Islands) 0–0 (0–3) (England) **Fulham**. Fulham win 3–0 on aggregate.
  - **Paks** (Hungary) 4–0 (1–0) (Andorra) UE Santa Coloma. Paks win 5–0 on aggregate.
  - Neath (Wales) 0–2 (1–4) (Norway) **Aalesund**. Aalesund win 6–1 on aggregate.
  - **Rabotnički** (North Macedonia) 3–0 (4–1) (Estonia) Narva Trans. Rabotnički win 7–1 on aggregate.
  - **Olimpija Ljubljana** (Slovenia) 3–0 (0–0) (Bosnia and Herzegovina) Široki Brijeg. Olimpija Ljubljana win 3–0 on aggregate.
  - Tre Penne (San Marino) 1–3 (0–6) (Serbia) **Rad**. Rad win 9–1 on aggregate.
  - **St Patrick's Athletic** (Republic of Ireland) 2–0 (0–1) (Iceland) ÍBV Vestmannaeyar. St Patrick's Athletic win 2–1 on aggregate.
  - Cliftonville (Northern Ireland) 0–1 (1–1) (Wales) **The New Saints**. The New Saints win 2–1 on aggregate.
  - **Glentoran** (Northern Ireland) 2–1 (a.e.t.) (1–2) (North Macedonia) Renova. 3–3 on aggregate; Glentoran win 3–2 on penalties.
  - **KR Reykjavík** (Iceland) 5–1 (3–1) (Faroe Islands) ÍF Fuglafjørður. KR Reykjavík win 8–2 on aggregate.

==== Golf ====
- Women's majors:
  - U.S. Women's Open in Colorado Springs, Colorado:
    - Leaderboard after first day: (T1) Cristie Kerr (USA) −2 after 15 holes & Amy Anderson (USA) −2 after 12 (T3) Inbee Park (KOR) −1 after 17, Ai Miyazato (JPN) −1 after 15 & Silvia Cavalleri (ITA) −1 after 1
      - 131 players will complete their first rounds on July 8.

==== Snooker ====
- Wuxi Classic in Wuxi, China, round 1:
  - **Peter Ebdon** (ENG) 5–3 Rouzi Maimaiti (CHN)
  - Matthew Stevens (WAL) 4–5 **Yu Delu** (CHN)
  - **Stephen Maguire** (SCO) 5–2 Liang Wenbo (CHN)
  - **Graeme Dott** (SCO) 5–2 Cao Yupeng (CHN)

==== Tennis ====
- Davis Cup World Group Quarterfinals:
  - Argentina 2–0 Kazakhstan
    - Juan Mónaco (ARG) def. Andrey Golubev (KAZ) 6–3, 6–0, 6–4
    - Juan Martín del Potro (ARG) def. Mikhail Kukushkin (KAZ) 6–2, 6–1, 6–2

==== Volleyball ====
- FIVB World League Final round in Gdańsk and Sopot, Poland (teams in **bold** advance to final four):
  - Pool E:
    - Bulgaria 0–3 **Argentina**
    - Italy 3–0 Poland
      - Standings (after 2 matches): Argentina 6 points, Italy 3, Poland 2, Bulgaria 1.
  - Pool F:
    - Cuba 0–3 **Russia**
    - United States 1–3 **Brazil**
      - Standings (after 2 matches): Russia 6 points, Brazil 5, Cuba 1, United States 0.
- Women's Pan-American Cup in Ciudad Juárez, Mexico:
  - Eleventh place match: Chile 0–3 **Costa Rica**
  - Classification 7–10:
    - **Canada** 3–0 Trinidad and Tobago
    - **Peru** 3–0 Mexico
  - Quarterfinals:
    - **Cuba** 3–0 Puerto Rico
    - **United States** 3–0 Argentina

=== July 6, 2011 (Wednesday) ===
==== Athletics ====
- World Youth Championships in Lille Métropole, France:
  - Boys' discus throw: (gold) Fedrick Dacres (JAM) 67.05m (silver) Ethan Cochran (USA) 61.37m (bronze) Gerhard de Beer (RSA) 60.63m
  - Girls' 3000m: (gold) Gotytom Gebreslase (ETH) 8:56.36 (silver) Ziporah Wanjiru Kngori (KEN) 8:56.82 (bronze) Caroline Chepkoech Kipkirui (KEN) 8:58.63
  - Girls' shot put: (gold) Tiangian Guo (CHN) 15.24m (silver) Sophie McKinna (GBR) 14.90m (bronze) Katinka Urbaniak (GER) 14.71m

==== Cricket ====
- Sri Lanka in England:
  - 4th ODI in Nottingham: Sri Lanka 174 (43.4 overs); England 171/0 (23.5/48 overs). **England win by 10 wickets (D/L); 5-match series tied 2–2.**
- India in the West Indies:
  - 3rd Test in Roseau, Dominica; day 1: West Indies 75/3 (31.1 overs); India

==== Cycling ====
- Grand Tours:
  - Tour de France, Stage 5: (gold) Mark Cavendish (GBR) (HTC–Highroad) 3h 38' 32" (silver) Philippe Gilbert (BEL) (Omega Pharma–Lotto) s.t. (bronze) José Joaquín Rojas (ESP) (Movistar Team) s.t.
    - General classification (after stage 5): (1) Thor Hushovd (NOR) (Garmin–Cervélo) 17h 36' 57" (2) Cadel Evans (AUS) (BMC Racing Team) + 1" (3) Fränk Schleck (LUX) (Leopard Trek) + 4"

==== Football (soccer) ====
- FIFA Women's World Cup in Germany (teams in **bold** advance to quarterfinals):
  - Group C:
    - **Sweden** 2–1 **United States** in Wolfsburg
    - North Korea 0–0 Colombia in Bochum
      - Final standings: Sweden 9 points, United States 6, North Korea, Colombia 1.
  - Group D:
    - Equatorial Guinea 0–3 **Brazil** in Frankfurt
    - **Australia** 2–1 Norway in Leverkusen
      - Final standings: Brazil 9 points, Australia 6, Norway 3, Equatorial Guinea 0.
- Copa América in Argentina:
  - Group A in Santa Fe: Argentina 0–0 Colombia
    - Standings: Colombia 4 points (2 matches), Argentina 2 (2), Bolivia 1 (1), Costa Rica 0 (1).
- UEFA Champions League First qualifying round, second leg (first leg score in parentheses):
  - **Valletta** (Malta) 2–1 (3–0) (San Marino) Tre Fiori. Valletta win 5–1 on aggregate.

==== Olympic Games ====
- Pyeongchang, South Korea is selected as host of the 2018 Winter Olympics at the 123rd IOC Session in Durban.

==== Rugby league ====
- State of Origin Series:
  - Game III in Brisbane: Queensland 34–24 New South Wales. **Queensland win series 2–1.**
    - Queensland win the series for the sixth successive time and 18th time overall.

==== Volleyball ====
- FIVB World League Final round in Gdańsk and Sopot, Poland:
  - Pool E:
    - Argentina 3–1 Italy
    - Poland 3–2 Bulgaria
  - Pool F:
    - Russia 3–1 United States
    - Brazil 3–2 Cuba

=== July 5, 2011 (Tuesday) ===
==== Cricket ====
- ICC Intercontinental Cup One-Day:
  - 2nd Match in Belfast: Namibia 175 (36/38 overs); Ireland 176/2 (30.2 overs). **Ireland win by 8 wickets.**

==== Cycling ====
- Grand Tours:
  - Tour de France, Stage 4: (gold) Cadel Evans (AUS) (BMC Racing Team) 4h 11' 39" (silver) Alberto Contador (ESP) (Saxo Bank–SunGard) s.t. (bronze) Alexander Vinokourov (KAZ) (Astana) s.t.
    - General classification (after stage 4): (1) Thor Hushovd (NOR) (Garmin–Cervélo) 13h 58' 25" (2) Evans + 1" (3) Fränk Schleck (LUX) (Leopard Trek) + 4"

==== Football (soccer) ====
- FIFA Women's World Cup in Germany (teams in **bold** advance to quarterfinals):
  - Group A:
    - **France** 2–4 **Germany** in Mönchengladbach
    - Canada 0–1 Nigeria in Dresden
      - Final standings: Germany 9 points, France 6, Nigeria 3, Canada 0.
  - Group B:
    - **England** 2–0 **Japan** in Augsburg
    - New Zealand 2–2 Mexico in Sinsheim
      - Final standings: England 7 points, Japan 6, Mexico 2, New Zealand 1.
- UEFA Champions League First qualifying round, second leg (first leg score in parentheses):
  - **F91 Dudelange** (Luxembourg) 2–0 (2–0) (Andorra) FC Santa Coloma. F91 Dudelange win 4–0 on aggregate.

==== Volleyball ====
- Women's Pan-American Cup in Ciudad Juárez, Mexico (teams in **bold** advance to semifinals, teams in italics advance to quarterfinals):
  - Group A:
    - Canada 3–0 Chile
    - Cuba 1–3 **Dominican Republic**
    - Mexico 0–3 Argentina
      - Final standings: Dominican Republic 15 points, Cuba 12, Argentina 9, Canada 6, Mexico 3, Chile 0.
  - Group B:
    - Costa Rica 0–3 Trinidad and Tobago
    - Peru 1–3 Puerto Rico
    - **Brazil** 3–2 United States
      - Final standings: Brazil 14 points, United States 13, Puerto Rico 9, Peru 6, Trinidad and Tobago 3, Costa Rica 0.

=== July 4, 2011 (Monday) ===
==== Cricket ====
- ICC Intercontinental Cup One-Day:
  - 1st Match in Belfast: Ireland 241 (49.5 overs); Namibia 215 (48.4 overs). **Ireland win by 26 runs.**

==== Cycling ====
- Grand Tours:
  - Tour de France, Stage 3: (gold) Tyler Farrar (USA) (Garmin–Cervélo) 4h 40' 21" (silver) Romain Feillu (FRA) (Vacansoleil–DCM) s.t. (bronze) José Joaquín Rojas (ESP) (Movistar Team) s.t.
    - General classification (after stage 3): (1) Thor Hushovd (NOR) (Garmin–Cervélo) 9h 46' 46" (2) David Millar (GBR) (Garmin–Cervélo) + 0" (3) Cadel Evans (AUS) (BMC Racing Team) + 1"

==== Football (soccer) ====
- FIFA U-17 World Cup in Mexico:
  - Quarterfinals:
    - **Germany** 3–2 England in Morelia
    - France 1–2 **Mexico** in Pachuca
- Copa América in Argentina:
  - Group C in San Juan:
    - Uruguay 1–1 Peru
    - Chile 2–1 Mexico

==== Volleyball ====
- Women's Pan-American Cup in Ciudad Juárez, Mexico:
  - Group A:
    - Argentina 3–0 Chile
    - Cuba 3–0 Canada
    - Dominican Republic 3–0 Mexico
      - Standings (after 4 matches): Cuba, Dominican Republic 12 points, Argentina 6, Canada, Mexico 3, Chile 0.
  - Group B:
    - Puerto Rico 3–0 Trinidad and Tobago
    - Brazil 3–0 Peru
    - United States 3–0 Costa Rica
      - Standings (after 4 matches): United States, Brazil 12 points, Puerto Rico, Peru 6, Trinidad and Tobago, Costa Rica 0.

=== July 3, 2011 (Sunday) ===
==== Auto racing ====
- World Touring Car Championship:
  - Race of Portugal in Porto:
    - Race 1: (1) Alain Menu (SUI) (Chevrolet; Chevrolet Cruze) (2) Yvan Muller (FRA) (Chevrolet; Chevrolet Cruze) (3) Robert Huff (GBR) (Chevrolet; Chevrolet Cruze)
    - Race 2: (1) Huff (2) Muller (3) Tiago Monteiro (POR) (Sunred Engineering; SEAT León)
      - Drivers' championship standings (after 6 of 12 rounds): (1) Huff 227 points (2) Muller 198 (3) Menu 167
- Intercontinental Le Mans Cup
  - 6 Hours of Imola in Imola, Italy: (gold) France #7 Peugeot Sport Total (Sébastien Bourdais (FRA), Anthony Davidson (GBR)) (silver) France #8 Peugeot Sport Total (Franck Montagny (FRA), Stéphane Sarrazin (FRA)) (bronze) Germany #1 Audi Sport Team Joest (Timo Bernhard (DEU), Marcel Fässler (SUI))

==== Basketball ====
- EuroBasket Women in Łódź, Poland:
  - Bronze medal game: Czech Republic 56–63 (bronze) **France**
  - Final: (gold) **Russia** 59–42 (silver) Turkey
    - Russia win the title for the third time and qualify for 2012 Olympic Tournament.
    - Turkey, France, Czech Republic and Croatia qualify for 2012 FIBA Olympic Qualifying Tournament.

==== Cricket ====
- Sri Lanka in England:
  - 3rd ODI in London: England 246/7 (50 overs; Alastair Cook 119); Sri Lanka 249/4 (48.2 overs; Dinesh Chandimal 105*). **Sri Lanka win by 6 wickets; lead 5-match series 2–1.**

==== Cycling ====
- Grand Tours:
  - Tour de France, Stage 2: (gold) Garmin–Cervélo 24' 48" (silver) BMC Racing Team + 4" (bronze) Team Sky + 4"
    - General classification (after stage 2): (1) Thor Hushovd (NOR) (Garmin–Cervélo) 5h 06' 25" (2) David Millar (GBR) (Garmin–Cervélo) + 0" (3) Cadel Evans (AUS) (BMC Racing Team) + 1"

==== Field hockey ====
- Women's Champions Trophy in Amsterdam, Netherlands:
  - 7th place match: Germany 3–5 **China**
  - 5th place match: **England** 2–0 Australia
  - 3rd place match: South Korea 2–3 (bronze) **New Zealand**
  - Final: (gold) **Netherlands** 3–3 (3–2 pen.) (silver) Argentina
    - Netherlands win the title for the sixth time.

==== Football (soccer) ====
- FIFA Women's World Cup in Germany:
  - Group D (team in **bold** advances to quarterfinals):
    - Australia 3–2 Equatorial Guinea in Bochum
    - **Brazil** 3–0 Norway in Wolfsburg
      - Standings (after 2 matches): Brazil 6 points, Australia, Norway 3, Equatorial Guinea 0.
- 2014 FIFA World Cup qualification (AFC) First round, second leg (first leg scores in parentheses):
  - Chinese Taipei 3–2 (1–2) **Malaysia**. 4–4 on aggregate, Malaysia win on away goals.
  - Pakistan 0–0 (0–3) **Bangladesh**. Bangladesh win 3–0 on aggregate.
  - **Laos** 6–2 (a.e.t.) (2–4) Cambodia. Laos win 8–6 on aggregate.
  - **Philippines** 4–0 (1–1) Sri Lanka. Philippines win 5–1 on aggregate.
  - **Palestine** 1–1 (2–0) Afghanistan. Palestine win 3–1 on aggregate.
  - Macau 1–7 (0–6) **Vietnam**. Vietnam win 13–1 on aggregate.
  - **Myanmar** 2–0 (0–1) Mongolia. Myanmar win 2–1 on aggregate.
- 2014 FIFA World Cup qualification (CONCACAF) First round, first leg: U.S. Virgin Islands 2–0 British Virgin Islands
- FIFA U-17 World Cup in Mexico:
  - Quarterfinals:
    - **Uruguay** 2–0 Uzbekistan in Monterrey
    - Japan 2–3 **Brazil** in Querétaro
- Copa América in Argentina:
  - Group B:
    - Brazil 0–0 Venezuela in La Plata
    - Paraguay 0–0 Ecuador in Santa Fe

==== Golf ====
- PGA Tour:
  - AT&T National in Newtown Square, Pennsylvania:
    - Winner: Nick Watney (USA) 267 (−13)
      - Watney wins his second PGA Tour title of the season and fourth of his career.
- European Tour:
  - Alstom Open de France in Guyancourt, France:
    - Winner: Thomas Levet (FRA) 277 (−7)
      - Levet wins his sixth European Tour title.
- Champions Tour:
  - Montreal Championship in Blainville, Quebec, Canada:
    - Winner: John Cook (USA) 195 (−21)
      - Cook wins his third Champions Tour title of the season, and eighth of his career.

==== Motorcycle racing ====
- Moto GP:
  - Italian Grand Prix in Mugello, Italy:
    - MotoGP: (1) Jorge Lorenzo (ESP) (Yamaha) (2) Andrea Dovizioso (ITA) (Honda) (3) Casey Stoner (AUS) (Honda)
      - Riders' championship standings (after 8 of 18 races): (1) Stoner 152 points (2) Lorenzo 133 (3) Dovizioso 119
    - Moto2: (1) Marc Márquez (ESP) (Suter) (2) Stefan Bradl (GER) (Kalex) (3) Bradley Smith (GBR) (Tech 3)
      - Riders' championship standings (after 8 of 17 races): (1) Bradl 147 points (2) Márquez 95 (3) Smith 79
    - 125cc: (1) Nicolás Terol (ESP) (Aprilia) (2) Johann Zarco (FRA) (Derbi) (3) Maverick Viñales (ESP) (Aprilia)
      - Riders' championship standings (after 8 of 17 races): (1) Terol 153 points (2) Zarco 114 (3) Viñales 106

==== Taekwondo ====
- World Olympic Qualification Tournament in Baku, Azerbaijan (top 3 qualify for 2012 Olympics):
  - Men's +80 kg: (gold) Cha Dong-Min (KOR) (silver) Gadzhi Umarov (RUS) (bronze) Alexandros Nikolaidis (GRE)
  - Women's 57 kg: (gold) Tseng Pei-hua (TPE) (silver) Hou Yuzhuo (CHN) (bronze) Ana Zaninović (CRO)

==== Tennis ====
- Grand Slams:
  - Wimbledon Championships in London, England, day 13:
    - Men's singles – Final: **Novak Djokovic** (SRB) [2] def. Rafael Nadal (ESP) [1] 6–4, 6–1, 1–6, 6–3
      - Djokovic wins his first Wimbledon title, and the second Grand Slam title of the year and third overall.
    - Mixed doubles – Final: **Jürgen Melzer** (AUT) / **Iveta Benešová** (CZE) [9] def. Mahesh Bhupathi (IND) / Elena Vesnina (RUS) [4] 6–3, 6–2
      - Melzer and Benešová win their first Grand Slam title in mixed doubles.
    - Girls' singles – Final: **Ashleigh Barty** (AUS) [12] def. Irina Khromacheva (RUS) [3] 7–5, 7–6(3)
      - Barty wins her first girls' Grand Slam title.
    - Boys' doubles – Final: **George Morgan** (GBR) / **Mate Pavić** (CRO) [2] def. Oliver Golding (GBR) / Jiří Veselý (CZE) [1] 3–6, 6–4, 7–5
    - Girls' doubles – Final: **Eugenie Bouchard** (CAN) / **Grace Min** (USA) [2] def. Demi Schuurs (NED) / Tang Haochen (CHN) 5–7, 6–2, 7–5
    - Gentlemen's Invitation Doubles Final: **Jacco Eltingh** (NED) / **Paul Haarhuis** (NED) def. Jonas Björkman (SWE) / Todd Woodbridge (AUS) 3–6, 6–3, [13–11]
    - Ladies' Invitation Doubles Final: **Lindsay Davenport** (USA) / **Martina Hingis** (SUI) def. Martina Navratilova (USA) / Jana Novotná (CZE) 6–4, 6–4
    - Senior Gentlemen's Invitation Doubles Final: **Pat Cash** (AUS) / **Mark Woodforde** (AUS) def. Jeremy Bates (GBR) / Anders Järryd (SWE) 6–3, 5–7, [10–5]
    - Wheelchair men's doubles final: **Maikel Scheffers** (NED) / **Ronald Vink** (NED) [1] def. Stéphane Houdet (FRA) / Michaël Jérémiasz (FRA) 7–5, 6–2
    - Wheelchair women's doubles final: **Esther Vergeer** (NED) / **Sharon Walraven** (NED) [1] def. Jiske Griffioen (NED) / Aniek van Koot (NED) [2] 6–4, 3–6, 7–5

==== Volleyball ====
- Women's Pan-American Cup in Ciudad Juárez, Mexico:
  - Group A:
    - Cuba 3–0 Chile
    - Dominican Republic 3–0 Argentina
    - Canada 3–0 Mexico
      - Standings (after 3 matches): Dominican Republic, Cuba 9 points, Canada, Argentina, Mexico 3, Chile 0.
  - Group B:
    - Peru 3–0 Costa Rica
    - United States 3–0 Trinidad and Tobago
    - Brazil 3–0 Puerto Rico
      - Standings (after 3 matches): Brazil, United States 9 points, Peru 6, Puerto Rico 3, Trinidad and Tobago, Costa Rica 0.

=== July 2, 2011 (Saturday) ===
==== Auto racing ====
- Sprint Cup Series:
  - Coke Zero 400 in Daytona Beach, Florida: (1) (Georgia (U.S. state)) David Ragan (Ford; Roush Fenway Racing) (2) (Wisconsin) Matt Kenseth (Ford; Roush Fenway Racing) (3) (Connecticut) Joey Logano (Toyota; Joe Gibbs Racing)
    - Drivers' championship standings (after 17 of 36 races): (1) (California) Kevin Harvick (Chevrolet; Richard Childress Racing) 586 points (2) (Missouri) Carl Edwards (Ford; Roush Fenway Racing) 581 (3) (Nevada) Kyle Busch (Toyota; Joe Gibbs Racing) 576

==== Basketball ====
- EuroBasket Women in Łódź, Poland:
  - 7th place game: Latvia 56–75 **Lithuania**
  - 5th place game (winner qualifies for 2012 FIBA Olympic Qualifying Tournament): **Croatia** 73–59 Montenegro

==== Cricket ====
- India in the West Indies:
  - 2nd Test in Bridgetown, Barbados, day 5: India 201 & 269/6d (102 overs; Fidel Edwards 5/76); West Indies 190 & 202/7 (71.3 overs). **Match drawn; India lead 3-match series 1–0.**

==== Cycling ====
- Grand Tours:
  - Tour de France, Stage 1: (gold) Philippe Gilbert (BEL) (Omega Pharma–Lotto) 4h 41' 31" (silver) Cadel Evans (AUS) (BMC Racing Team) + 3" (bronze) Thor Hushovd (NOR) (Garmin–Cervélo) + 6"

==== Equestrianism ====
- Show jumping – Global Champions Tour:
  - 6th Competition in Cascais (CSI 5*): (gold) Christian Ahlmann (GER) on Taloubet Z (silver) Luciana Diniz (POR) on Winningmood (bronze) Ludger Beerbaum (GER) on Chaman
    - Standings (after 6 of 10 competitions): (1) Beerbaum 186.5 points (2) Edwina Alexander (AUS) 155 (3) Diniz 149

==== Field hockey ====
- Women's Champions Trophy in Amsterdam, Netherlands (teams in **bold** advance to the final):
  - Pool C:
    - **Argentina** 3–2 New Zealand
    - South Korea 0–2 **Netherlands**
      - Final standings: Netherlands 7 points, Argentina, Korea 4, New Zealand 1.

==== Football (soccer) ====
- FIFA Women's World Cup in Germany:
  - Group C (teams in **bold** advance to quarterfinals):
    - North Korea 0–1 **Sweden** in Leverkusen
    - **United States** 3–0 Colombia in Sinsheim
      - Standings (after 2 matches): United States, Sweden 6 points, North Korea, Colombia 0.
- 2014 FIFA World Cup qualification (AFC) First round, second leg (first leg scores in parentheses):
  - Timor-Leste 0–5 (1–2) **Nepal** in Kathmandu. Nepal win 7–1 on aggregate.
- 2014 FIFA World Cup qualification (CONCACAF) First round, first leg: Turks and Caicos Islands 0–4 Bahamas
- Copa América in Argentina:
  - Group A in Jujuy: Colombia 1–0 Costa Rica
- (Canada) Canadian Championship Final, second leg (first leg score in parentheses):
  - **Toronto FC** 2–1 (1–1) Vancouver Whitecaps FC. Toronto win 3–2 on aggregate.
    - Toronto win the title for the third successive time.

==== Handball ====
- Pan American Women's Championship in São Bernardo do Campo, Brazil:
  - Bronze medal game: (bronze) **Cuba** 37–27 Uruguay
  - Gold medal match: (silver) Argentina 16–35 (gold) **Brazil**
    - Brazil win the title for the seventh time. Argentina, Cuba and Uruguay qualify for the World Championship, along with hosts Brazil.

==== Mixed martial arts ====
- UFC 132 in Las Vegas, United States:
  - Bantamweight Championship bout: **Dominick Cruz** (USA) (c) def. Urijah Faber (USA) via unanimous decision (50–45, 49–46, 48–47)
  - Middleweight bout: **Chris Leben** (USA) def. Wanderlei Silva (BRA) via KO (punches)
  - Light Heavyweight bout: **Tito Ortiz** (USA) def. Ryan Bader (USA) via submission (guillotine choke)
  - Welterweight bout: **Carlos Condit** (USA) def. Kim Dong-hyun (ROK) via TKO (flying knee and punches)
  - Lightweight bout: **Dennis Siver** (GER) def. Matt Wiman (USA) via unanimous decision (29–28, 29–28, 29–28)

==== Rugby union ====
- Super Rugby finals:
  - Semi-finals:
    - In Brisbane: **Reds** (Australia) 30–13 (New Zealand) Blues
    - In Cape Town: Stormers (South Africa) 10–29 (New Zealand) **Crusaders**
- IRB Pacific Nations Cup, round 1:
  - Tonga 45–21 Fiji in Lautoka, Fiji
  - Samoa 34–15 Japan in Tokyo, Japan

==== Taekwondo ====
- World Olympic Qualification Tournament in Baku, Azerbaijan (top 3 qualify for 2012 Olympics):
  - Men's 80 kg: (gold) Ramin Azizov (AZE) (silver) Yousef Karami (IRI) (bronze) Mauro Sarmiento (ITA)
  - Women's 49 kg: (gold) Wu Jingyu (CHN) (silver) Lucija Zaninović (CRO) (bronze) Yang Shu-chun (TPE)

==== Tennis ====
- Grand Slams:
  - Wimbledon Championships in London, England, day 12:
    - Women's singles – Final: **Petra Kvitová** (CZE) [8] def. Maria Sharapova (RUS) [5] 6–3, 6–4
      - Kvitová wins her first Grand Slam title, and becomes the first Czech woman since Jana Novotná at the 1998 Wimbledon Championships to win a Grand Slam singles title.
    - Men's doubles – Final: **Bob Bryan** (USA) / **Mike Bryan** (USA) [1] def. Robert Lindstedt (SWE) / Horia Tecău (ROM) [8] 6–3, 6–4, 7–6(2)
      - The Bryans win their second Wimbledon title and a record-equalling11th Grand Slam title in men's doubles, tying the all-time record of Todd Woodbridge and Mark Woodforde.
    - Women's doubles – Final: **Květa Peschke** (CZE) / **Katarina Srebotnik** (SLO) [2] def. Sabine Lisicki (GER) / Samantha Stosur (AUS) 6–3, 6–1
      - Peschke and Srebotnik win their first women's doubles Grand Slam title.
    - Boys' singles – Final: **Luke Saville** (AUS) [16] def. Liam Broady (GBR) [15] 2–6, 6–4, 6–2
      - Saville wins his first boys' Grand Slam title.

==== Volleyball ====
- FIVB World League, Week 6 (teams in **bold** advance to final round):
  - Pool A: **United States** 3–0 Puerto Rico
    - Final standings: **Brazil** 30 points, United States 23, **Poland** 18, Puerto Rico 1.
- Women's Pan-American Cup in Ciudad Juárez, Mexico:
  - Group A:
    - Dominican Republic 3–0 Chile
    - Canada 1–3 Argentina
    - Cuba 3–0 Mexico
      - Standings (after 2 matches): Dominican Republic, Cuba 6 points, Mexico, Argentina 3, Canada, Chile 0.
  - Group B:
    - Peru 3–0 Trinidad and Tobago
    - Brazil 3–0 Costa Rica
    - United States 3–0 Puerto Rico
      - Standings (after 2 matches): Brazil, United States 6 points, Puerto Rico, Peru 3, Trinidad and Tobago, Costa Rica 0.

=== July 1, 2011 (Friday) ===
==== Auto racing ====
- Nationwide Series:
  - Subway Jalapeño 250 in Daytona Beach, Florida: (1) (Connecticut) Joey Logano (Toyota; Joe Gibbs Racing) (2) (California) Jason Leffler (Chevrolet; Turner Motorsports) (3) (Georgia (U.S. state)) Reed Sorenson (Chevrolet; Turner Motorsports)
    - Drivers' championship standings (after 17 of 34 races): (1) Sorenson 610 points (2) (Virginia) Elliott Sadler (Chevrolet; Kevin Harvick Incorporated) 603 (3) (Mississippi) Ricky Stenhouse Jr. (Ford; Roush Fenway Racing) 579

==== Basketball ====
- EuroBasket Women in Łódź, Poland:
  - Classification round: **Montenegro** 68–59 Lithuania
  - Semifinals:
    - **Russia** 85–53 Czech Republic
    - **Turkey** 68–62 (OT) France

==== Cricket ====
- Sri Lanka in England:
  - 2nd ODI in Leeds: Sri Lanka 309/5 (50 overs; Mahela Jayawardene 144); England 240 (45.5 overs). **Sri Lanka win by 69 runs; 5-match series tied 1–1.**
- India in the West Indies:
  - 2nd Test in Bridgetown, Barbados, day 4: India 201 & 229/3 (89 overs); West Indies 190. India lead by 240 runs with 7 wickets remaining.

==== Field hockey ====
- Women's Champions Trophy in Amsterdam, Netherlands:
  - Pool D:
    - China 1–4 Germany
    - England 3–2 Australia
      - Final standings: England 7 points, Australia 4, Germany 3, China 2.

==== Football (soccer) ====
- FIFA Women's World Cup in Germany:
  - Group B (team in **bold** advances to quarterfinals):
    - **Japan** 4–0 Mexico in Leverkusen
    - New Zealand 1–2 England in Dresden
      - Standings (after 2 matches): Japan 6 points, England 4, Mexico 1, New Zealand 0.
- Copa América in Argentina:
  - Group A in La Plata: Argentina 1–1 Bolivia

==== Taekwondo ====
- World Olympic Qualification Tournament in Baku, Azerbaijan (top 3 qualify for 2012 Olympics):
  - Men's 68 kg: (gold) Servet Tazegül (TUR) (silver) Mohammad Bagheri Motamed (IRN) (bronze) Diogo Silva (BRA)
  - Women's +67 kg: (gold) Gwladys Épangue (FRA) (silver) An Sae-Bom (KOR) (bronze) Anastasia Baryshnikova (RUS)

==== Tennis ====
- Grand Slams:
  - Wimbledon Championships in London, England, day 11:
    - Men's Singles Semi-finals:
      - **Rafael Nadal** (ESP) [1] def. Andy Murray (GBR) [4] 5–7, 6–2, 6–2, 6–4
        - Nadal reaches his fifth Wimbledon final in six years, and 13th Grand Slam final overall.
      - **Novak Djokovic** (SRB) [2] def. Jo-Wilfried Tsonga (FRA) [12] 7–6(4), 6–2, 6–7(9), 6–3
        - Djokovic reaches his first Wimbledon final, and fifth Grand Slam final overall. In doing so, Djokovic becomes the world number 1 player in the ATP rankings.

==== Volleyball ====
- FIVB World League, Week 6 (teams in **bold** advance to final round):
  - Pool A: United States 3–2 Puerto Rico
    - Standings: **Brazil** 30 points (12 matches), United States 20 (11), **Poland** 18 (12), Puerto Rico 1 (11).
  - Pool B:
    - **Bulgaria** 2–3 **Russia**
    - Germany 3–0 Japan
      - Final standings: Russia 31 points, Bulgaria 22, Germany 15, Japan 4.
  - Pool C: Finland 3–0 Portugal
    - Final standings: **Argentina** 25 points, Serbia 21, Finland 17, Portugal 9.
  - Pool D:
    - **Italy** 0–3 **Cuba**
    - France 3–0 South Korea
      - Final standings: Italy 28 points, Cuba 23, France 11, Korea 10.
- Women's Pan-American Cup in Ciudad Juárez, Mexico:
  - Group A:
    - Cuba 3–1 Argentina
    - Dominican Republic 3–0 Canada
    - Chile 0–3 Mexico
  - Group B:
    - Puerto Rico 3–0 Costa Rica
    - Brazil 3–0 Trinidad and Tobago
    - United States 3–0 Peru
