= June 2011 in sports =

<<	June 2011					>>
Su	Mo	Tu	We	Th	Fr	Sa
			1	2	3	4
5	6	7	8	9	10	11
12	13	14	15	16	17	18
19	20	21	22	23	24	25
26	27	28	29	30
Sports

This list shows notable sports-related deaths, events, and notable outcomes that occurred in June of 2011.

== Deaths in June ==
- 9: Josip Katalinski
- 9: Mike Mitchell

== Current sporting seasons ==
=== Australian rules football 2011 ===
- Australian Football League

=== Auto racing 2011 ===
- Formula One
- Sprint Cup
- Nationwide Series
- Camping World Truck Series
- IRL IndyCar Series
- World Rally Championship
- WTCC
- V8 Supercar
- Formula Two
- GP2 Series
- GP3 Series
- American Le Mans
- Le Mans Series
- Superleague Formula
- Rolex Sports Car Series
- FIA GT1 World Championship
- Auto GP
- Formula Renault 3.5 Series
- Deutsche Tourenwagen Masters
- Super GT

=== Baseball 2011 ===
- Major League Baseball
- Nippon Professional Baseball

=== Basketball 2011 ===
- NBA (NBA Finals)
- WNBA
- France
- Germany
- Greece
- Italy
- Philippines
  - Governors Cup
- Russia
- Spain (Playoffs)
- Turkey

=== Canadian football 2011 ===
- Canadian Football League

=== Cricket 2011 ===
- England:
  - County Championship
  - Clydesdale Bank 40
  - Friends Life t20

=== Football (soccer) 2011 ===
National teams competitions

- UEFA Euro 2012 qualifying
- 2012 Africa Cup of Nations qualification
- 2014 FIFA World Cup qualification

International clubs competitions

- UEFA (Europe) Champions League
- UEFA Europa League
- Copa Libertadores (South America)
- AFC (Asia) Champions League
- AFC Cup
- CAF (Africa) Champions League
- CAF Confederation Cup

Domestic (national) competitions

- Argentina
- Brazil
- Japan
- Norway
- Russia
- Major League Soccer (USA & Canada)
- Women's Professional Soccer (USA)

=== Golf 2011 ===
- PGA Tour
- European Tour
- LPGA Tour
- Champions Tour

=== Ice hockey 2011 ===
- National Hockey League (Stanley Cup Finals)

=== Motorcycle racing 2011 ===
- Moto GP
- Superbike World Championship
- Supersport World Championship

=== Rugby league 2011 ===
- Super League
- NRL

=== Rugby union 2011 ===
- Top 14
- Super Rugby

=== Snooker 2011 ===
- Players Tour Championship

=== Tennis 2011 ===
- ATP World Tour
- WTA Tour

=== Volleyball 2011 ===
National teams competitions

- World League
- Men's European League
- Women's European League

== Days of the month ==
=== June 30, 2011 (Thursday) ===
==== Athletics ====
- Samsung Diamond League:
  - Athletissima in Lausanne, Switzerland:
    - Men:
      - 100m: Asafa Powell (JAM) 9.78
      - 110m hurdles: Dayron Robles (CUB) 13.12
      - 400m: Jermaine Gonzales (JAM) 45.27
      - 400m hurdles: David Greene (GBR) 48.41
      - 800m: David Rudisha (KEN) 1:44.15
      - 5000m: Vincent Chepkok (KEN) 12:59.13
      - Triple jump: Teddy Tamgho (FRA) 17.91m
      - Pole vault: Renaud Lavillenie (FRA) 5.83m
      - Shot put: Christian Cantwell (USA) 21.83m
      - Javelin throw: Andreas Thorkildsen (NOR) 88.19m
    - Women:
      - 100m hurdles: Sally Pearson (AUS) 12.47
      - 200m: Mariya Ryemyen (UKR) 22.85
      - 400m: Amantle Montsho (BOT) 50.23
      - 1500m: Morgan Uceny (USA) 4:05.52
      - 3000m steeplechase: Milcah Chemos Cheywa (KEN) 9:19.87
      - Long jump: Brittney Reese (USA) 6.85m
      - High jump: Anna Chicherova (RUS) 1.95m
      - Discus throw: Yarelis Barrios (CUB) 64.29m

==== Basketball ====
- EuroBasket Women in Łódź, Poland:
  - Quarterfinals:
    - Montenegro 44–56 **Turkey**
    - Lithuania 58–66 **France**
  - Classification round: Latvia 75–84 **Croatia**

==== Cricket ====
- India in the West Indies:
  - 2nd Test in Bridgetown, Barbados, day 3: India 201 & 23/0 (5.4 overs); West Indies 190 (73.5 overs; Ishant Sharma 6/55). India lead by 34 runs with 10 wickets remaining.

==== Field hockey ====
- Women's Champions Trophy in Amsterdam, Netherlands:
  - Pool C:
    - South Korea 5–3 New Zealand
    - Argentina 1–2 Netherlands
      - Standings (after 2 matches): Korea, Netherlands 4 points, Argentina, New Zealand 1.
  - Pool D:
    - China 2–2 Australia
    - England 1–0 Germany
      - Standings (after 2 matches): Australia, England 4 points, China 2, Germany 0.

==== Football (soccer) ====
- FIFA Women's World Cup in Germany:
  - Group A (teams in **bold** advance to the quarterfinals):
    - Canada 0–4 **France** in Bochum
    - **Germany** 1–0 Nigeria in Frankfurt
      - Standings (after 2 matches): France, Germany 6 points, Nigeria, Canada 0.
- FIFA U-17 World Cup in Mexico:
  - Round of 16:
    - **Germany** 4–0 United States in Querétaro
    - **England** 1–1 (4–2 pen.) Argentina in Pachuca
    - **France** 3–2 Ivory Coast in Querétaro
    - **Mexico** 2–0 Panama in Pachuca
- UEFA Europa League First qualifying round, first leg:
  - Banants (Armenia) 0–1 (Georgia (country)) Olimpi Rustavi
  - AZAL Baku (Azerbaijan) 1–1 (Belarus) Minsk
  - Banga Gargždai (Lithuania) 0–4 (Azerbaijan) Qarabağ
  - Narva Trans (Estonia) 1–4 (North Macedonia) Rabotnički
  - Rad (Serbia) 6–0 (San Marino) Tre Penne
  - Daugava Daugavpils (Latvia) 0–5 (Norway) Tromsø
  - Elfsborg (Sweden) 4–0 (Luxembourg) Fola Esch
  - Honka (Finland) 0–0 (Estonia) Nõmme Kalju
  - Varaždin (Croatia) 5–1 (Andorra) Lusitanos
  - Ferencváros (Hungary) 3–0 (Armenia) Ulisses
  - UE Santa Coloma (Andorra) 0–1 (Hungary) Paks
  - Aalesund (Norway) 4–1 (Wales) Neath
  - Dinamo Tbilisi (Georgia (country)) 2–0 (Moldova) Milsami Orhei
  - Spartak Trnava (Slovakia) 3–0 (Montenegro) Zeta
  - ÍF Fuglafjørður (Faroe Islands) 1–3 (Iceland) KR Reykjavík
  - ÍBV Vestmannaeyar (Iceland) 1–0 (Republic of Ireland) St Patrick's Athletic
  - Käerjéng 97 (Luxembourg) 1–1 (Sweden) Häcken
  - The New Saints (Wales) 1–1 (Northern Ireland) Cliftonville
  - Fulham (England) 3–0 (Faroe Islands) NSÍ Runavík
  - Jagiellonia Białystok (Poland) 1–0 (Kazakhstan) Irtysh Pavlodar
  - Birkirkara (Malta) 0–1 (Albania) Vllaznia Shkodër
  - Renova (North Macedonia) 2–1 (Northern Ireland) Glentoran
  - Koper (Slovenia) 1–1 (Kazakhstan) Shakhter Karagandy
  - Široki Brijeg (Bosnia and Herzegovina) 0–0 (Slovenia) Olimpija Ljubljana
  - Budućnost Podgorica (Montenegro) 1–3 (Albania) Flamurtari Vlorë

==== Taekwondo ====
- World Olympic Qualification Tournament in Baku, Azerbaijan (top 3 qualify for 2012 Olympics):
  - Men's 58 kg: (gold) Penek Karaket (THA) (silver) Gabriel Mercedes (DOM) (bronze) Lee Dae-Hoon (KOR)
  - Women's 67 kg: (gold) Kim Mi-Kyung (KOR) (silver) Farida Azizova (AZE) (bronze) Elin Johansson (SWE)

==== Tennis ====
- Grand Slams:
  - Wimbledon Championships in London, England, day 10:
    - Women's singles Semi-finals:
      - **Petra Kvitová** (CZE) [8] def. Victoria Azarenka (BLR) [4] 6–1, 3–6, 6–2
        - Kvitová reaches her first Grand Slam final, and becomes the first Czech woman to reach a Grand Slam singles final since Jana Novotná at the 1998 Wimbledon Championships.
      - **Maria Sharapova** (RUS) [5] def. Sabine Lisicki (GER) 6–4, 6–3
        - Sharapova reaches her second Wimbledon final, and her fifth Grand Slam final overall.

==== Volleyball ====
- FIVB World League, Week 6 (teams in **bold** advance to the final round):
  - Pool A: **Poland** 0–3 **Brazil**
    - Standings: Brazil 30 points (12 matches), United States 18 (10), Poland 18 (12), Puerto Rico 0 (10).
  - Pool B:
    - Bulgaria 3–1 **Russia**
    - Germany 3–1 Japan
      - Standings (after 11 matches): Russia 29 points, Bulgaria 21, Germany 12, Japan 4.
  - Pool C:
    - Finland 3–2 Portugal
    - Serbia 0–3 **Argentina**
      - Standings: Argentina 25 points (12 matches), Serbia 21 (12), Finland 14 (11), Portugal 9 (11).

=== June 29, 2011 (Wednesday) ===
==== Basketball ====
- EuroBasket Women in Łódź, Poland:
  - Quarterfinals:
    - Latvia 72–83 **Russia**
    - **Czech Republic** 79–63 Croatia

==== Cricket ====
- India in the West Indies:
  - 2nd Test in Bridgetown, Barbados, day 2: India 201; West Indies 98/5 (37.3 overs). West Indies trail by 103 runs with 5 wickets remaining in the 1st innings.
- Netherlands in Scotland:
  - 2nd ODI in Aberdeen: Netherlands 180/9 (50 overs); Scotland 162/5 (39.1/41 overs). **Scotland win by 5 wickets (D/L); win 2-match series 2–0.**

==== Football (soccer) ====
- FIFA Women's World Cup in Germany:
  - Group D:
    - Norway 1–0 Equatorial Guinea in Augsburg
    - Brazil 1–0 Australia in Mönchengladbach
- 2014 FIFA World Cup qualification (AFC) First round, first leg:
  - Malaysia 2–1 Chinese Taipei
  - Bangladesh 3–0 Pakistan
  - Cambodia 4–2 Laos
  - Sri Lanka 1–1 Philippines
  - Afghanistan 0–2 Palestine
  - Vietnam 6–0 Macau
  - Nepal 2–1 Timor-Leste
  - Mongolia 1–0 Myanmar
- FIFA U-17 World Cup in Mexico:
  - Round of 16:
    - **Uzbekistan** 4–0 Australia in Torreón
    - **Brazil** 2–0 Ecuador in Guadalajara
    - Congo 1–2 **Uruguay** in Morelia
    - **Japan** 6–0 New Zealand in Monterrey

==== Tennis ====
- Grand Slams:
  - Wimbledon Championships in London, England, day 9:
    - Men's singles Quarterfinals:
      - **Rafael Nadal** (ESP) [1] def. Mardy Fish (USA) [10] 6–3, 6–3, 5–7, 6–4
      - **Novak Djokovic** (SRB) [2] def. Bernard Tomic (AUS) 6–2, 3–6, 6–3, 7–5
      - **Jo-Wilfried Tsonga** (FRA) [12] def. Roger Federer (SUI) [3] 3–6, 6–7(3), 6–4, 6–4, 6–4
      - **Andy Murray** (GBR) [4] def. Feliciano López (ESP) 6–3, 6–4, 6–4

==== Volleyball ====
- FIVB World League, Week 6 (teams in **bold** advance to the final round):
  - Pool A: **Poland** 1–3 **Brazil**
    - Standings: Brazil 27 points (11 matches), Poland 18 (11), United States 18 (10), Puerto Rico 0 (10).
  - Pool C: Serbia 3–1 Argentina
    - Standings: Argentina 22 points (11 matches), Serbia 21 (11), Finland 12 (10), Portugal 8 (10).
  - Pool D:
    - **Italy** 3–0 Cuba
    - France 3–1 South Korea
      - Standings (after 11 matches): Italy 28 points, Cuba 20, South Korea 10, France 8.

=== June 28, 2011 (Tuesday) ===
==== Baseball ====
- College World Series Final in Omaha, Nebraska (best-of-3 series):
  - Game 2: South Carolina 5, Florida 2. **South Carolina wins series 2–0.**
    - The Gamecocks win their second successive NCAA baseball title.

==== Cricket ====
- Sri Lanka in England:
  - 1st ODI in London: England 229/8 (32/32 overs); Sri Lanka 121 (27 overs). **England win by 110 runs (D/L); lead 5-match series 1–0.**
- India in the West Indies:
  - 2nd Test in Bridgetown, Barbados, day 1: India 201 (68 overs); West Indies 30/3 (12 overs). West Indies trail by 171 runs with 7 wickets remaining in the 1st innings.
- Netherlands in Scotland:
  - 1st ODI in Aberdeen: Scotland 255/7 (50 overs); Netherlands 240 (49 overs). **Scotland win by 15 runs; lead 2-match series 1–0.**

==== Field hockey ====
- Women's Champions Trophy in Amsterdam, Netherlands (teams in **bold** advance to pool C):
  - Pool A:
    - England 0–0 China
    - **Argentina** 1–1 **South Korea**
      - Final standings: Argentina 7 points, Korea 3, England, China 2.
  - Pool B:
    - Australia 1–0 Germany
    - **Netherlands** 0–0 **New Zealand**
      - Final standings: Netherlands 7 points, New Zealand 4, Germany, Australia 3.

==== Football (soccer) ====
- FIFA Women's World Cup in Germany:
  - Group C:
    - Colombia 0–1 Sweden in Leverkusen
    - United States 2–0 North Korea in Dresden
- UEFA Champions League First qualifying round, first leg:
  - FC Santa Coloma (Andorra) 0–2 (Luxembourg) F91 Dudelange
  - Tre Fiori (San Marino) 0–3 (Malta) Valletta

==== Ice hockey ====
- The Hockey Hall of Fame announces its 2011 induction class, consisting of Ed Belfour, Doug Gilmour, Mark Howe, and Joe Nieuwendyk.

==== Tennis ====
- Grand Slams:
  - Wimbledon Championships in London, England, day 8:
    - Women's singles Quarter-Finals:
      - **Victoria Azarenka** (BLR) [4] def. Tamira Paszek (AUT) 6–3, 6–1
      - **Maria Sharapova** (RUS) [5] def. Dominika Cibulková (SVK) [24] 6–1, 6–1
      - **Petra Kvitová** (CZE) [8] def. Tsvetana Pironkova (BUL) [32] 6–3, 6–7(5), 6–2
      - **Sabine Lisicki** (GER) def. Marion Bartoli (FRA) [9] 6–4, 6–7(4), 6–1

=== June 27, 2011 (Monday) ===
==== Baseball ====
- College World Series Final in Omaha, Nebraska (best-of-3 series):
  - Game 1: South Carolina 2, Florida 1 (11 innings). South Carolina lead series 1–0.

==== Basketball ====
- EuroBasket Women in Poland (teams in **bold** advance to the quarter-finals):
  - Group E in Bydgoszcz:
    - **Russia** 62–59 Great Britain
    - **Czech Republic** 63–59 **Lithuania**
    - Belarus 56–65 **Turkey**
      - Final standings: Czech Republic, Lithuania 9 points, Russia 8, Turkey, Belarus 7, Great Britain 5.

==== Football (soccer) ====
- FIFA Women's World Cup in Germany:
  - Group B:
    - Japan 2–1 New Zealand in Bochum
    - Mexico 1–1 England in Wolfsburg
- FIFA U-17 World Cup in Mexico (teams in **bold** advance to the knockout stage):
  - Group F: **Australia** 1–1 Denmark in Querétaro
    - Final standings: **Brazil** 7 points, **Ivory Coast**, Australia 4, Denmark 1.

==== Tennis ====
- Grand Slams:
  - Wimbledon Championships in London, England, day 7:
    - Men's singles Fourth round:
      - **Rafael Nadal** (ESP) [1] def. Juan Martín del Potro (ARG) [24] 7–6(6), 3–6, 7–6(4), 6–4
      - **Novak Djokovic** (SRB) [2] def. Michaël Llodra (FRA) [19] 6–3, 6–3, 6–3
      - **Roger Federer** (SUI) [3] def. Mikhail Youzhny (RUS) [18] 6–7(5), 6–3, 6–3, 6–3
      - **Andy Murray** (GBR) [4] def. Richard Gasquet (FRA) [17] 7–6(3), 6–3, 6–2
      - **Mardy Fish** (USA) [10] def. Tomáš Berdych (CZE) [6] 7–6(5), 6–4, 6–4
      - **Jo-Wilfried Tsonga** (FRA) [12] def. David Ferrer (ESP) [7] 6–3, 6–4, 7–6(1)
      - **Feliciano López** (ESP) def. Łukasz Kubot (POL) 3–6, 6–7(5), 7–6(7), 7–5, 7–5
      - **Bernard Tomic** (AUS) def. Xavier Malisse (BEL) 6–1, 7–5, 6–4
    - Women's singles Fourth round:
      - **Dominika Cibulková** (SVK) [24] def. Caroline Wozniacki (DEN) [1] 1–6, 7–6(5), 7–5
      - **Victoria Azarenka** (BLR) [4] def. Nadia Petrova (RUS) 6–2, 6–2
      - **Maria Sharapova** (RUS) [5] def. Peng Shuai (CHN) [20] 6–4, 6–2
      - **Marion Bartoli** (FRA) [9] def. Serena Williams (USA) [7] 6–3, 7–6(6)
      - **Petra Kvitová** (CZE) [8] def. Yanina Wickmayer (BEL) [19] 6–0, 6–2
      - **Tsvetana Pironkova** (BUL) [32] def. Venus Williams (USA) [23] 6–2, 6–3
      - **Sabine Lisicki** (GER) def. Petra Cetkovská (CZE) 7–6(3), 6–1
      - **Tamira Paszek** (AUT) def. Ksenia Pervak (RUS) 6–2, 2–6, 6–3

=== June 26, 2011 (Sunday) ===
==== Auto racing ====
- Formula One:
  - European Grand Prix in Valencia, Spain: (1) Sebastian Vettel (GER) (Red Bull–Renault) (2) Fernando Alonso (ESP) (Ferrari) (3) Mark Webber (AUS) (Red Bull-Renault)
    - Drivers' championship standings (after 8 of 19 races): (1) Vettel 186 points (2) Jenson Button (GBR) (McLaren–Mercedes) & Webber 109
- Sprint Cup Series:
  - Toyota/Save Mart 350 in Sonoma, California: (1) (Nevada) Kurt Busch (Dodge; Penske Racing) (2) Jeff Gordon (Chevrolet; Hendrick Motorsports) (3) (Missouri) Carl Edwards (Ford; Roush Fenway Racing)
    - Drivers' championship standings (after 16 of 36 races): (1) Edwards 573 points (2) (California) Kevin Harvick (Chevrolet; Richard Childress Racing) 548 (3) (California) Jimmie Johnson (Chevrolet; Hendrick Motorsports) 540

==== Badminton ====
- BWF Super Series:
  - Indonesia Super Series Premier in Jakarta:
    - Men's singles: **Lee Chong Wei** (MAS) def. Peter Gade (DEN) 21–11, 21–7
    - Women's singles: **Wang Yihan** (CHN) def. Saina Nehwal (IND) 12–21, 23–21, 21–14
    - Men's doubles: **Cai Yun** (CHN)/**Fu Haifeng** (CHN) def. Chai Biao (CHN)/Guo Zhendong (CHN) 21–13, 21–12
    - Women's doubles: **Wang Xiaoli** (CHN)/**Yu Yang** (CHN) def. Vita Marissa (INA)/Nadya Melati (INA) 21–12, 21–10
    - Mixed doubles: **Zhang Nan** (CHN)/**Zhao Yunlei** (CHN) def. Tontowi Ahmad (INA)/Liliyana Natsir (INA) 20–22, 21–14, 21–9

==== Basketball ====
- EuroBasket Women in Poland:
  - Group F in Katowice (teams in **bold** advance to the quarter-finals):
    - **France** 58–54 Poland
    - Spain 71–75 **Croatia**
    - **Latvia** 70–74 **Montenegro**
      - Final standings: Montenegro 10 points, Latvia, France 8, Croatia, Spain 7, Poland 5.

==== Equestrianism ====
- Show jumping – British Jumping Derby meeting at Hickstead (CSI 4*): (gold) Tina Fletcher (GBR) on Promised Land (silver) five-way tie; best time: Shane Breen (IRL) on Gold Rain

==== Field hockey ====
- Women's Champions Trophy in Amsterdam, Netherlands (teams in **bold** advance to pool C):
  - Pool A:
    - England 2–2 South Korea
    - China 1–4 **Argentina**
      - Standings (after 2 matches): Argentina 6 points, Korea 2, England, China 1.
  - Pool B:
    - Australia 2–3 New Zealand
    - Germany 1–2 **Netherlands**
      - Standings (after 2 matches): Netherlands 6 points, New Zealand, Germany 3, Australia 0.

==== Football (soccer) ====
- FIFA Women's World Cup in Germany:
  - Group A:
    - Nigeria 0–1 France in Sinsheim
    - Germany 2–1 Canada in Berlin
- FIFA U-17 World Cup in Mexico (teams in **bold** advance to the knockout stage):
  - Group E:
    - Burkina Faso 0–2 **Ecuador** in Guadalajara
    - **Panama** 0–2 **Germany** in Querétaro
      - Final standings: Germany 9 points, Ecuador 6, Panama 3, Burkina Faso 0.
  - Group F:
    - Australia 0–1 Denmark in Querétaro — match abandoned after 25 minutes due to heavy rain and lightning.
    - **Ivory Coast** 3–3 **Brazil** in Guadalajara
      - Standings: Brazil 7 points (3 matches), Côte d'Ivoire 4 (3), Australia 3 (2), Denmark 0 (2).

==== Golf ====
- Women's majors:
  - Wegmans LPGA Championship in Pittsford, New York:
    - Leaderboard after final round (USA unless stated): (1) Yani Tseng (TWN) 269 (−19) (2) Morgan Pressel 279 (−9) (T3) Paula Creamer, Cristie Kerr & Suzann Pettersen (NOR) 280 (−8)
      - Tseng wins the tournament for the second time, for her fourth major title and eighth LPGA Tour title. Her score in relation to par ties the record shared by Dottie Pepper at the 1999 Kraft Nabisco Championship, Karen Stupples at the 2004 British Open, and Kerr at the 2010 LPGA Championship.
- PGA Tour:
  - Travelers Championship in Cromwell, Connecticut:
    - Winner: Fredrik Jacobson (SWE) 260 (−20)
      - Jacobson wins his first PGA Tour title.
- European Tour:
  - BMW International Open in Munich, Germany:
    - Winner: Pablo Larrazábal (ESP) 272 (−16)^{PO}
      - Larrazábal defeats Sergio García (ESP) on the fifth playoff hole to win his second European Tour title.
- Champions Tour:
  - Dick's Sporting Goods Open in Endicott, New York:
    - Winner: John Huston (USA) 200 (−16)
      - In his third Tour start, Huston wins his first title.

==== Horse racing ====
- Canadian Thoroughbred Triple Crown:
  - Queen's Plate in Toronto: (gold) Inglorious (trainer: Josie Carroll; jockey: Luis Contreras) (silver) Hippolytus (trainer: Mark Casse; jockey: Tyler Pizarro) (bronze) Pender Harbour (trainer: Michael De Paulo; jockey: Chantal Sutherland)
- Irish Derby in Newbridge, County Kildare (all trained by Aidan O'Brien): (gold) Treasure Beach (jockey: Colm O'Donoghue) (silver) Seville (jockey: Seamie Heffernan) (bronze) Memphis Tennessee (jockey: Joseph O'Brien)
  - Aidan O'Brien trains the race winner for the sixth consecutive year, and a record-extending ninth time overall.

==== Mixed martial arts ====
- UFC Live: Kongo vs. Barry in Pittsburgh, Pennsylvania, United States:
  - Heavyweight bout: **Cheick Kongo** (FRA) def. Pat Barry (USA) via KO (punch)
  - Welterweight bout: **Charlie Brenneman** (USA) def. Rick Story (USA) via unanimous decision (29–28, 29–28, 29–28)
  - Welterweight bout: **Matt Brown** (USA) def. John Howard (USA) via unanimous decision (29–28, 29–28, 29–28)
  - Heavyweight bout: **Matt Mitrione** (USA) def. Christian Morecraft (USA) via KO (punches)

==== Rugby union ====
- IRB Junior World Championship in Italy:
  - 11th place game in Rovigo: Tonga 22–34 **Italy**
  - 9th place game in Rovigo: Scotland 14–15 **Argentina**
  - 7th place game in Treviso: **Wales** 38–24 Ireland
  - 5th place game in Treviso: Fiji 17–104 **South Africa**
  - Third place game in Padua: France 17–30 **Australia**
  - Final in Padua: England 22–33 **New Zealand**
    - New Zealand win the title for the fourth successive time.

==== Volleyball ====
- FIVB World League, Week 5 (teams in **bold** advance to the final round):
  - Pool B: Bulgaria 3–2 Japan
    - Standings (after 10 matches): **Russia** 29 points, Bulgaria 18, Germany 9, Japan 4.
  - Pool C: Portugal 1–3 Serbia
    - Standings (after 10 matches): **Argentina** 22 points, Serbia 18, Finland 12, Portugal 8.
  - Pool D:
    - France 1–3 Cuba
    - **Italy** 3–0 South Korea
      - Standings (after 10 matches): Italy 25 points, Cuba 20, South Korea 10, France 5.
- Men's European League, Leg 5 (team in **bold** advances to the final round):
  - Pool B: Greece 2–3 Netherlands
    - Standings (after 10 matches): Spain 26 points, Netherlands 22, Greece 8, Austria 4.
  - Pool C:
    - **Slovakia** 1–3 Romania
    - Belarus 3–0 Turkey
      - Standings (after 10 matches): Romania 21 points, Slovakia 18, Belarus 14, Turkey 7.
- Women's European League, Leg 5 (teams in **bold** advance to the final round):
  - Pool A:
    - Greece 1–3 France
    - **Serbia** 3–0 Spain
      - Standings (after 10 matches): Serbia 29 points, France 16, Spain 13, Greece 2.
  - Pool C:
    - Belarus 3–1 **Turkey**
    - Croatia 3–0 Romania
      - Standings (after 10 matches): Turkey 24 points, Romania 17, Belarus 15, Croatia 4.

=== June 25, 2011 (Saturday) ===
==== Auto racing ====
- Nationwide Series:
  - Bucyrus 200 in Elkhart Lake, Wisconsin: (1) (Georgia (U.S. state)) Reed Sorenson (Chevrolet; Turner Motorsports) (2) (Canada) Ron Fellows (Chevrolet; JR Motorsports) (3) (Canada) Jacques Villeneuve (Dodge; Penske Racing)
    - Drivers' championship standings (after 16 of 34 races): (1) Sorenson 568 points (2) (Virginia) Elliott Sadler (Chevrolet; Kevin Harvick Incorporated) 563 (3) (Mississippi) Ricky Stenhouse Jr. (Ford; Roush Fenway Racing) 561
- IndyCar Series:
  - Iowa Corn Indy 250 in Newton, Iowa: (1) Marco Andretti (USA) (Andretti Autosport) (2) Tony Kanaan (BRA) (KV Racing Technology – Lotus) (3) Scott Dixon (NZL) (Chip Ganassi Racing)
    - Drivers' championship standings (after 9 of 18 races): (1) Dario Franchitti (GBR) (Chip Ganassi Racing) 303 points (2) Will Power (AUS) (Team Penske) 283 (3) Dixon 230

==== Basketball ====
- EuroBasket Women in Poland (teams in **bold** advance to the quarter-finals):
  - Group E in Bydgoszcz:
    - Great Britain 57–64 Turkey
    - **Russia** 69–55 **Czech Republic**
    - **Lithuania** 68–50 Belarus
      - Standings (after 4 matches): Lithuania 8 points, Czech Republic 7, Russia, Belarus 6, Turkey 5, Great Britain 4.

==== Cricket ====
- Sri Lanka in England:
  - Only T20I in Bristol: England 136/9 (20 overs); Sri Lanka 137/1 (17.2 overs). **Sri Lanka win by 9 wickets.**

==== Equestrianism ====
- Show jumping – Global Champions Tour:
  - 5th Competition in Monte Carlo (CSI 5*): (gold) Rolf-Göran Bengtsson (SWE) on Casall (silver) Christian Ahlmann (GER) on Taloubet Z (bronze) Rodrigo Pessoa (BRA) on Let's Fly
    - Standings (after 5 of 10 competitions): (1) Edwina Alexander (AUS) 155 points (2) Ludger Beerbaum (GER) 151.5 (3) Álvaro de Miranda Neto (BRA) 123

==== Field hockey ====
- Women's Champions Trophy in Amsterdam, Netherlands:
  - Pool A:
    - China 2–2 South Korea
    - Argentina 1–0 England
  - Pool B:
    - Germany 1–0 New Zealand
    - Netherlands 3–0 Australia

==== Football (soccer) ====
- CONCACAF Gold Cup in the United States:
  - Final: United States 2–4 **Mexico** in Pasadena
    - Mexico win the title for the sixth time and a spot in the 2013 FIFA Confederations Cup in Brazil.
- UEFA European Under-21 Championship in Denmark:
  - Olympic play-off: Czech Republic 0–1 **Belarus** in Aalborg
    - Belarus qualify for the 2012 Olympic tournament.
  - Final: **Spain** 2–0 Switzerland in Aarhus
    - Spain win the title for the third time.
- FIFA U-17 World Cup in Mexico (teams in **bold** advance to the knockout stage):
  - Group C:
    - **Uruguay** 0–2 **England** in Torreón
    - Canada 0–0 Rwanda in Pachuca
      - Final standings: England 7 points, Uruguay 6, Canada 2, Rwanda 1.
  - Group D:
    - **United States** 0–0 **New Zealand** in Pachuca
    - Czech Republic 1–2 **Uzbekistan** in Torreón
      - Final standings: Uzbekistan 6 points, United States, New Zealand 4, Czech Republic 3.

==== Golf ====
- Women's majors:
  - Wegmans LPGA Championship in Pittsford, New York:
    - Leaderboard after third round: (1) Yani Tseng (TWN) 203 (−13) (T2) Cindy LaCrosse (USA) & Morgan Pressel (USA) 208 (−8)

==== Inline hockey ====
- IIHF World Championship in Pardubice, Czech Republic:
  - Bronze medal game: (bronze) **Canada** 13–7 Sweden
  - Gold medal match: (gold) **Czech Republic** 3–2 (silver) United States
    - The Czech Republic win the title for the first time.

==== Motorcycle racing ====
- Moto GP:
  - Dutch TT in Assen, Netherlands:
    - MotoGP: (1) Ben Spies (USA) (Yamaha) (2) Casey Stoner (AUS) (Honda) (3) Andrea Dovizioso (ITA) (Honda)
      - Riders' championship standings (after 7 of 18 races): (1) Stoner 136 points (2) Jorge Lorenzo (ESP) (Yamaha) 108 (3) Dovizioso 99
    - Moto2: (1) Marc Márquez (ESP) (Suter) (2) Kenan Sofuoğlu (TUR) (Suter) (3) Bradley Smith (GBR) (Tech 3)
      - Riders' championship standings (after 7 of 17 races): (1) Stefan Bradl (GER) (Kalex) 127 points (2) Márquez 70 (3) Simone Corsi (ITA) (FTR) 67
    - 125cc: (1) Maverick Viñales (ESP) (Aprilia) (2) Luis Salom (ESP) (Aprilia) (3) Sergio Gadea (ESP) (Aprilia)
      - Riders' championship standings (after 7 of 17 races): (1) Nicolás Terol (ESP) (Aprilia) 128 points (2) Jonas Folger (GER) (Aprilia) 101 (3) Sandro Cortese (GER) (Aprilia) & Johann Zarco (FRA) (Derbi) 94

==== Rugby union ====
- Super Rugby Finals:
  - Qualifier 2 in Nelson: **Crusaders** (New Zealand) 36–8 (South Africa) Sharks

==== Tennis ====
- Grand Slams:
  - Wimbledon Championships in London, England, day 6:
    - Men's singles Third round:
      - **Rafael Nadal** (ESP) [1] def. Gilles Müller (LUX) 7–6(6), 7–6(5), 6–0
      - **Novak Djokovic** (SRB) [2] def. Marcos Baghdatis (CYP) [32] 6–4, 4–6, 6–3, 6–4
      - **Roger Federer** (SUI) [3] def. David Nalbandian (ARG) [28] 6–4, 6–2, 6–4
      - **Bernard Tomic** (AUS) def. Robin Söderling (SWE) [5] 6–1, 6–4, 7–5
      - **Tomáš Berdych** (CZE) [6] def. Alex Bogomolov Jr. (USA) 6–2, 6–4, 6–3
      - **David Ferrer** (ESP) [7] def. Karol Beck (SVK) 6–4, 6–3, 6–3
      - **Łukasz Kubot** (POL) def. Gaël Monfils (FRA) [9] 6–3, 3–6, 6–3, 6–3
      - **Mardy Fish** (USA) [10] def. Robin Haase (NED) 6–3, 6–7(5), 6–2, 1–1 retired
    - Women's singles Third round:
      - **Caroline Wozniacki** (DEN) [1] def. Jarmila Gajdošová (AUS) [27] 6–3, 6–2
      - **Maria Sharapova** (RUS) [5] def. Klára Zakopalová (CZE) 6–2, 6–3
      - **Tamira Paszek** (AUT) def. Francesca Schiavone (ITA) [6] 6–3, 4–6, 11–9
      - **Serena Williams** (USA) [7] def. Maria Kirilenko (RUS) [26] 6–3, 6–2
      - **Marion Bartoli** (FRA) [9] def. Flavia Pennetta (ITA) [21] 7–5, 4–6, 9–7

==== Volleyball ====
- FIVB World League, Week 5 (teams in **bold** advance to the final round):
  - Pool A:
    - **Poland** 3–0 Puerto Rico
    - United States 3–1 **Brazil**
      - Standings (after 10 matches): Brazil 24 points, Poland, United States 18, Puerto Rico 0.
  - Pool B: Bulgaria 3–0 Japan
    - Standings: **Russia** 29 points (10 matches), Bulgaria 16 (9), Germany 9 (10), Japan 3 (9).
  - Pool C: Portugal 2–3 Serbia
    - Standings: Argentina 22 points (10 matches), Serbia 15 (9), Finland 12 (10), Portugal 8 (9).
- Men's European League, Leg 5 (teams in **bold** advance to the final round):
  - Pool A:
    - Great Britain 3–2 Belgium
    - Croatia 3–1 **Slovenia**
      - Standings (after 10 matches): Slovenia 23 points, Belgium 15, Great Britain, Croatia 11.
  - Pool B:
    - Greece 0–3 Netherlands
    - Austria 2–3 Spain
      - Standings: Spain 26 points (10 matches), Netherlands 20 (9), Greece 7 (9), Austria 4 (10).
  - Pool C:
    - **Slovakia** 3–1 Romania
    - Belarus 2–3 Turkey
      - Standings (after 9 matches): Romania, Slovakia 18 points, Belarus 11, Turkey 7.
- Women's European League, Leg 5 (teams in **bold** advance to the final round):
  - Pool A:
    - Greece 1–3 France
    - **Serbia** 3–1 Spain
      - Standings (after 9 matches): Serbia 26 points, France, Spain 13, Greece 2.
  - Pool B:
    - Bulgaria 3–0 Hungary
    - Czech Republic 3–0 Israel
      - Standings (after 10 matches): Bulgaria 26 points, Czech Republic 24, Hungary 6, Israel 4.
  - Pool C:
    - Belarus 1–3 **Turkey**
    - Croatia 0–3 Romania
      - Standings (after 9 matches): Turkey 24 points, Romania 17, Belarus 12, Croatia 1.
- Asian Women's Club Championship in Vĩnh Phúc, Vietnam:
  - 3rd place: Thong Tin Lien Viet Bank (Vietnam) 0–3 (bronze) (Kazakhstan) **Zhetysu Almaty**
  - Final: (gold) **Chang** (Thailand) 3–0 (silver) (China) Tianjin Bridgestone
    - Chang win the title for the first time.

=== June 24, 2011 (Friday) ===
==== Basketball ====
- EuroBasket Women in Poland (teams in **bold** advance to the quarter-finals):
  - Group F in Katowice:
    - Spain 66–57 **Latvia**
    - Croatia 64–56 Poland
    - **Montenegro** 73–68 **France**
      - Standings (after 4 matches): Montenegro 8 points, Latvia 7, France, Spain 6, Croatia 5, Poland 4.

==== Boxing ====
- European Men's Championships in Ankara, Turkey:
  - Light flyweight: (gold) Salman Alizade (AZE) (silver) Belik Galanov (RUS) (bronze) Georgi Andonov (BUL) & Charlie Edwards (ENG)
  - Flyweight: (gold) Andrew Selby (WAL) (silver) Georgy Balakshin (RUS) (bronze) Alexander Riscan (MDA) & Vincenzo Picardi (ITA)
  - Bantamweight: (gold) Veaceslav Gojan (MDA) (silver) Dmitriy Polyanskiy (RUS) (bronze) Razvan Andreiana (ROU) & Furkan Ulaş Memiş (TUR)
  - Lightweight: (gold) Fatih Keleş (TUR) (silver) Domenico Valentino (ITA) (bronze) Vladimir Saruhanyan (ARM) & Volodymyr Matviychuk (UKR)
  - Light welterweight: (gold) Ray Moylette (IRL) (silver) Tom Stalker (ENG) (bronze) Vincenzo Mangiacapre (ITA) & Gaybatulla Hajialiyev (AZE)
  - Welterweight: (gold) Fred Evans (WAL) (silver) Magomed Nurutdinov (BLR) (bronze) Adriani Vastine (FRA) & Zaal Kvachatadze (GEO)
  - Middleweight: (gold) Maxim Koptyakov (RUS) (silver) Adem Kılıççı (TUR) (bronze) Jaba Khocitashvili (GEO) & Dmitro Mitrofanov (UKR)
  - Light heavyweight: (gold) Joe Ward (IRL) (silver) Nikita Ivanov (RUS) (bronze) Imre Szellő (HUN) & Hrvoje Sep (CRO)
  - Heavyweight: (gold) Teymur Mammadov (AZE) (silver) Tervel Pulev (BUL) (bronze) Bahram Muzaffer (TUR) & Johann Witt (GER)
  - Super heavyweight: (gold) Magomed Omarov (RUS) (silver) Roberto Cammarelle (ITA) (bronze) Mikheil Bakhtidze (GEO) & Mihai Nistor (ROU)

==== Cricket ====
- ICC Intercontinental Cup, round 1:
  - In Aberdeen, day 4: Scotland 309 (107 overs; Majid Haq 120*, Mudassar Bukhari 5/79); Netherlands 306/8 (70 overs). **Match drawn.**

==== Football (soccer) ====
- FIFA U-17 World Cup in Mexico (teams in **bold** advance to the quarter-finals):
  - Group A:
    - North Korea 1–1 **Congo** in Morelia
    - **Mexico** 3–2 Netherlands in Monterrey
      - Final standings: Mexico 9 points, Congo 4, North Korea 2, Netherlands 1.
  - Group B:
    - **Japan** 3–1 Argentina in Morelia
    - Jamaica 1–1 **France** in Monterrey
      - Final standings: Japan 7 points, France 5, Argentina 3, Jamaica 1.

==== Golf ====
- Women's majors:
  - Wegmans LPGA Championship in Pittsford, New York (USA unless stated):
    - Leaderboard after first round: (1) Yani Tseng (TWN) 66 (−6) (2) Paula Creamer 67 (−5) (T3) Diana D'Alessio, Meena Lee (KOR), Stacy Prammanasudh & Angela Stanford 68 (−4)
    - Leaderboard after second round: (1) Tseng 136 (−8) (2) Pat Hurst 137 (−7) (T3) Minea Blomqvist (FIN), Hee Young Park (KOR) & Morgan Pressel 138 (−6)

==== Ice hockey ====
- NHL entry draft in St. Paul, Minnesota: Ryan Nugent-Hopkins of the Red Deer Rebels is selected as the number one overall pick by the Edmonton Oilers.

==== Rugby union ====
- Super Rugby Finals:
  - Qualifier 1 in Auckland: **Blues** (New Zealand) 26–13 (Australia) Waratahs

==== Tennis ====
- Grand Slams:
  - Wimbledon Championships in London, England, day 5:
    - Men's singles:
      - Second round: **David Ferrer** (ESP) [7] def. Ryan Harrison (USA) 6–7(6), 6–1, 4–6, 6–3, 6–2
      - Third round:
        - Rafael Nadal (ESP) [1] vs. Gilles Müller (LUX) 7–6(6) (match suspended)
        - **Andy Murray** (GBR) [4] def. Ivan Ljubičić (CRO) 6–4, 4–6, 6–1, 7–6(4)
        - Alex Bogomolov Jr. (USA) vs. Tomáš Berdych (CZE) [6] 2–6, 4–6, 3–4 (match suspended)
        - **Feliciano López** (ESP) def. Andy Roddick (USA) [8] 7–6(2), 7–6(2), 6–4
        - Gaël Monfils (FRA) [9] vs. Łukasz Kubot (POL) 3–6, 6–3, 3–3 (match suspended)
    - Women's singles:
      - Second round:
        - **Caroline Wozniacki** (DEN) [1] def. Virginie Razzano (FRA) 6–1, 6–3
        - **Maria Sharapova** (RUS) [5] def. Laura Robson (GBR) 7–6(4), 6–3
        - **Marion Bartoli** (FRA) [9] def. Lourdes Domínguez Lino (ESP) 4–6, 7–5, 6–2
      - Third round:
        - **Tsvetana Pironkova** (BUL) [32] def. Vera Zvonareva (RUS) [2] 6–2, 6–3
        - **Victoria Azarenka** (BLR) [4] def. Daniela Hantuchová (SVK) [25] 6–3, 3–6, 6–2
        - Francesca Schiavone (ITA) [6] vs. Tamira Paszek (AUT) 6–3, 4–6, 2–3 (match suspended)
        - **Petra Kvitová** (CZE) [8] def. Roberta Vinci (ITA) [29] 6–3, 6–3

==== Volleyball ====
- FIVB World League, Week 5 (teams in **bold** advance to the final round):
  - Pool A:
    - **Poland** 3–1 Puerto Rico
    - United States 1–3 Brazil
      - Standings (after 9 matches): Brazil 24 points, Poland, United States 15, Puerto Rico 0.
  - Pool B: Germany 1–3 **Russia**
    - Standings: Russia 29 points (10 matches), Bulgaria 13 (8), Germany 9 (10), Japan 3 (8).
  - Pool C: Argentina 1–3 Finland
    - Standings: Argentina 22 points (10 matches), Serbia 13 (8), Finland 12 (10), Portugal 7 (8).
  - Pool D:
    - Italy 3–0 South Korea
    - France 2–3 Cuba
      - Standings (after 9 matches): Italy 22 points, Cuba 17, South Korea 10, France 5.
- Men's European League, Leg 5:
  - Pool A:
    - Great Britain 2–3 Belgium
    - Croatia 0–3 Slovenia
      - Standings (after 9 matches): Slovenia 23 points, Belgium 14, Great Britain 9, Croatia 8.
  - Pool B: Austria 1–3 Spain
    - Standings: Spain 24 points (9 matches), Netherlands 17 (8), Greece 7 (8), Austria 3 (9).
- Women's European League, Leg 5:
  - Pool B:
    - Bulgaria 3–1 Hungary
    - Czech Republic 3–1 Israel
      - Standings (after 9 matches): Bulgaria 23 points, Czech Republic 21, Hungary 6, Israel 4.

=== June 23, 2011 (Thursday) ===
==== Basketball ====
- EuroBasket Women in Poland (teams in **bold** advance to the quarter-finals):
  - Group E in Bydgoszcz:
    - Great Britain 63–64 **Lithuania**
    - Belarus 62–51 Russia
    - Turkey 51–56 **Czech Republic**
      - Standings (after 3 matches): Czech Republic, Lithuania 6 points, Belarus 5, Russia 4, Turkey, Great Britain 3.
- NBA draft in Newark, New Jersey: Kyrie Irving of the Duke Blue Devils is selected as the number one overall pick by the Cleveland Cavaliers.

==== Cricket ====
- ICC Intercontinental Cup, round 1:
  - In Aberdeen, day 3: Scotland 237/3 (75 overs); Netherlands.
- India in the West Indies:
  - 1st Test in Kingston, Jamaica, day 4: India 246 & 252; West Indies 173 & 262 (68.2 overs). **India win by 63 runs; lead 3-match series 1–0.**

==== Football (soccer) ====
- FIFA U-17 World Cup in Mexico (teams in **bold** advance to the knockout stage):
  - Group E in Querétaro:
    - Burkina Faso 0–3 **Germany**
    - Panama 1–2 Ecuador
      - Standings (after 2 matches): Germany 6 points, Panama, Ecuador 3, Burkina Faso 0.
  - Group F in Guadalajara:
    - Australia 0–1 **Brazil**
    - Ivory Coast 4–2 Denmark
      - Standings (after 2 matches): Brazil 6 points, Côte d'Ivoire, Australia 3, Denmark 0.
- Friendly international (top 10 in FIFA World Rankings):
  - (7) Uruguay 3–0 Estonia
- Friendly women's internationals (top 10 in FIFA Women's World Rankings):
  - (4) Japan 1–1 (5) Sweden
  - Australia 2–0 (10) England

==== Golf ====
- Women's majors:
  - Wegmans LPGA Championship in Pittsford, New York:
    - Leaderboard after first day (USA unless stated): (1) Yani Tseng (TWN) 66 (−6) (2) Paula Creamer 67 (−5) (T3) Diana D'Alessio, Meena Lee (KOR), Stacy Prammanasudh & Angela Stanford 68 (−4)
      - Six players will complete their first rounds on June 24.

==== Tennis ====
- Grand Slams:
  - Wimbledon Championships in London, England, day 4:
    - Men's singles second round:
      - **Novak Djokovic** (SRB) [2] def. Kevin Anderson (RSA) 6–3, 6–4, 6–2
      - **Roger Federer** (SUI) [3] def. Adrian Mannarino (FRA) 6–2, 6–3, 6–2
      - **Robin Söderling** (SWE) [5] def. Lleyton Hewitt (AUS) 6–7(5), 3–6, 7–5, 6–4, 6–4
      - David Ferrer (ESP) [7] vs. Ryan Harrison (USA) 6–7(6), 6–1, 4–6, 4–2 (match suspended)
    - Women's singles Second round:
      - **Sabine Lisicki** (GER) def. Li Na (CHN) [3] 3–6, 6–4, 8–6
      - **Francesca Schiavone** (ITA) [6] def. Barbora Záhlavová-Strýcová (CZE) 7–5, 6–3
      - **Serena Williams** (USA) [7] def. Simona Halep (ROU) 3–6, 6–2, 6–1

==== Volleyball ====
- FIVB World League, Week 5 (team in **bold** advances to the Final round):
  - Pool B: Germany 2–3 **Russia**
    - Standings: Russia 26 points (9 matches), Bulgaria 13 (8), Germany 9 (9), Japan 3 (8).
  - Pool C: Argentina 3–2 Finland
    - Standings: Argentina 22 points (8 matches), Serbia 13 (7), Finland 9 (8), Portugal 7 (7).

=== June 22, 2011 (Wednesday) ===
==== Basketball ====
- EuroBasket Women in Poland (teams in **bold** advance to the quarter-finals):
  - Group F in Katowice:
    - Croatia 60–81 **Montenegro**
    - Poland 53–62 **Latvia**
    - France 79–55 Spain
      - Standings (after 3 matches): Montenegro, Latvia 6 points, France 5, Spain 4, Croatia, Poland 3.

==== Cricket ====
- ICC Intercontinental Cup, round 1:
  - In Aberdeen, day 2: Scotland vs. Netherlands; No play due to rain.
- India in the West Indies:
  - 1st Test in Kingston, Jamaica, day 3: India 246 & 252 (94.5 overs; Rahul Dravid 112); West Indies 173 & 131/3 (33 overs). West Indies require another 195 runs with 7 wickets remaining.

==== Football (soccer) ====
- CONCACAF Gold Cup in the United States:
  - Semifinals in Houston:
    - **United States** 1–0 Panama
    - Honduras 0–2 (a.e.t.) **Mexico**
- UEFA European Under-21 Championship in Denmark:
  - Semifinals: (winners qualify for 2012 Olympic tournament)
    - **Spain** 3–1 (a.e.t.) Belarus in Viborg
    - **Switzerland** 1–0 (a.e.t.) Czech Republic in Herning
- FIFA U-17 World Cup in Mexico (team in **bold** advances to the knockout stage):
  - Group C in Pachuca:
    - **Uruguay** 1–0 Rwanda
    - Canada 2–2 England
      - Standings (after 2 matches): Uruguay 6 points, England 4, Canada 1, Rwanda 0.
  - Group D in Torreón:
    - United States 1–2 Uzbekistan
    - Czech Republic 1–0 New Zealand
      - Standings (after 2 matches): New Zealand, United States, Uzbekistan, Czech Republic 3 points.
- Copa Libertadores Finals, second leg (first leg score in parentheses):
  - **Santos** (Brazil) 2–1 (0–0) (Uruguay) Peñarol. Santos win 4–1 on points.
    - Santos win the title for the third time, and their first since 1963.

==== Rugby union ====
- IRB Junior World Championship in Italy:
  - 9–12th place play-offs in Rovigo:
    - **Scotland** 30–11 Tonga
    - **Argentina** 12–8 Italy
  - 5–8th place play-offs in Padua:
    - Wales 20–34 **Fiji**
    - **South Africa** 57–15 Ireland
  - Semifinals in Treviso:
    - **England** 33–18 France
    - **New Zealand** 37–7 Australia

==== Snooker ====
- Players Tour Championship:
  - Event 1 in Sheffield, England:
    - Final: Joe Perry (ENG) 0–4 **Ronnie O'Sullivan** (ENG)
      - O'Sullivan wins the 46th professional title of his career.

==== Tennis ====
- Grand Slams:
  - Wimbledon Championships in London, England, day 3:
    - Men's singles second round:
      - **Rafael Nadal** (ESP) [1] def. Ryan Sweeting (USA) 6–3, 6–2, 6–4
      - **Andy Murray** (GBR) [4] def. Tobias Kamke (GER) 6–3, 6–3, 7–5
      - **Tomáš Berdych** (CZE) [6] def. Julien Benneteau (FRA) 6–1, 6–4, 6–2
      - **Andy Roddick** (USA) [8] def. Victor Hănescu (ROU) 6–4, 6–3, 6–4
      - **Gaël Monfils** (FRA) [9] def. Grega Žemlja (SLO) 4–6, 6–3, 6–3, 7–6(7)
      - **Mardy Fish** (USA) [10] def. Denis Istomin (UZB) 7–6(4), 6–4, 6–4
    - Women's singles Second round:
      - **Vera Zvonareva** (RUS) [2] def. Elena Vesnina (RUS) 6–1, 7–6(5)
      - **Victoria Azarenka** (BLR) [4] def. Iveta Benešová (CZE) 6–0, 6–3
      - **Petra Kvitová** (CZE) [8] def. Anne Keothavong (GBR) 6–2, 6–1

=== June 21, 2011 (Tuesday) ===
==== Cricket ====
- ICC Intercontinental Cup, round 1:
  - In Aberdeen, day 1: Scotland vs. Netherlands; No play due to rain.
- India in the West Indies:
  - 1st Test in Kingston, Jamaica, day 2: India 246 & 91/3 (41 overs); West Indies 173 (67.5 overs). India lead by 164 runs with 7 wickets remaining.

==== Football (soccer) ====
- FIFA U-17 World Cup in Mexico (team in **bold** advances to the knockout stage):
  - Group A in Morelia:
    - North Korea 1–1 Netherlands
    - **Mexico** 2–1 Congo
      - Standings (after 2 matches): Mexico 6 points, Congo 3, Netherlands, North Korea 1.
  - Group B in Monterrey:
    - Japan 1–1 France
    - Jamaica 1–2 Argentina
      - Standings (after 2 matches): France, Japan 4 points, Argentina 3, Jamaica 0.
- Friendly women's internationals (top 10 in FIFA Women's World Rankings):
  - (5) Sweden 1–1 (1) United States

==== Ice hockey ====
- NHL news: The NHL Board of Governors unanimously approve the move of the Atlanta Thrashers to Winnipeg.

==== Tennis ====
- Grand Slams:
  - Wimbledon Championships in London, England, day 2:
    - Men's singles first round:
      - **Novak Djokovic** (SRB) [2] def. Jérémy Chardy (FRA) 6–4, 6–1, 6–1
      - **Roger Federer** (SUI) [3] def. Mikhail Kukushkin (KAZ) 7–6(2), 6–4, 6–2
      - **Robin Söderling** (SWE) [5] def. Philipp Petzschner (GER) 6–4, 6–4, 2–6, 7–6(5)
      - **David Ferrer** (ESP) [7] def. Benoît Paire (FRA) 6–4, 6–4, 6–4
      - **Andy Roddick** (USA) [8] def. Andreas Beck (GER) 6–4, 7–6(6), 6–3
    - Women's singles first round:
      - **Caroline Wozniacki** (DEN) [1] def. Arantxa Parra Santonja (ESP) 6–2, 6–1
      - **Li Na** (CHN) [3] def. Alla Kudryavtseva (RUS) 6–3, 6–3
      - **Victoria Azarenka** (BLR) [4] def. Magdaléna Rybáriková (SVK) 6–4, 3–2 retired
      - **Maria Sharapova** (RUS) [5] def. Anna Chakvetadze (RUS) 6–2, 6–1
      - **Serena Williams** (USA) [7] def. Aravane Rezaï (FRA) 6–3, 3–6, 6–1
      - **Petra Kvitová** (CZE) [8] def. Alexa Glatch (USA) 6–2, 6–2
      - **Marion Bartoli** (FRA) [9] def. Kristýna Plíšková (CZE) 6–0, 6–2
      - **Melinda Czink** (HUN) def. Samantha Stosur (AUS) [10] 6–3, 6–4

=== June 20, 2011 (Monday) ===
==== Basketball ====
- EuroBasket Women in Poland (teams in **bold** advance to the Main round):
  - Group A in Bydgoszcz:
    - Slovakia 57–46 **Lithuania**
    - **Turkey** 65–80 **Russia**
      - Final standings: Lithuania 6 points, Russia 5, Turkey 4, Slovak Republic 3.
  - Group B in Bydgoszcz:
    - **Great Britain** 74–51 Israel
    - **Czech Republic** 67–62 **Belarus**
      - Final standings: Czech Republic 6 points, Belarus 5, Great Britain 4, Israel 3.
  - Group C in Katowice:
    - Germany 64–76 **Montenegro**
    - **Poland** 63–78 **Spain**
      - Final standings: Montenegro 6 points, Spain 5, Poland 4, Germany 3.
  - Group D in Katowice:
    - **Croatia** 61–67 **Latvia**
    - Greece 55–64 **France**
      - Final standings: Latvia, France 5 points, Croatia, Greece 3.

==== Cricket ====
- Sri Lanka in England:
  - 3rd Test in Southampton, day 5: Sri Lanka 184 & 334/5 (104 overs; Kumar Sangakkara 119); England 377/8d. **Match drawn; England win 3-match series 1–0.**
- India in the West Indies:
  - 1st Test in Kingston, Jamaica, day 1: India 246 (61.2 overs); West Indies 34/1 (20 overs). West Indies trail by 212 runs with 9 wickets remaining in the 1st innings.

==== Football (soccer) ====
- Friendly international (top 10 in FIFA World Rankings):
  - (5) Argentina 4–0 Albania
- FIFA U-17 World Cup in Mexico:
  - Group E in Querétaro:
    - Germany 6–1 Ecuador
    - Burkina Faso 0–1 Panama
  - Group F in Guadalajara:
    - Brazil 3–0 Denmark
    - Australia 2–1 Ivory Coast

==== Tennis ====
- Grand Slams:
  - Wimbledon Championships in London, England, day 1:
    - Men's singles first round:
      - **Rafael Nadal** (ESP) [1] def. Michael Russell (USA) 6–4, 6–2, 6–2
      - **Andy Murray** (GBR) [4] def. Daniel Gimeno Traver (ESP) 4–6, 6–3, 6–0, 6–0
      - **Tomáš Berdych** (CZE) [6] def. Filippo Volandri (ITA) 6–2, 6–2, 6–1
      - **Gaël Monfils** (FRA) [9] def. Matthias Bachinger (GER) 6–4, 7–6(3), 6–3
      - **Mardy Fish** (USA) [10] def. Marcel Granollers (ESP) 7–6(3), 7–6(5), 6–4
    - Women's singles first round:
      - **Vera Zvonareva** (RUS) [2] def. Alison Riske (USA) 6–0, 3–6, 6–3
      - Victoria Azarenka (BLR) [4] vs. Magdaléna Rybáriková (SVK) 6–4, 3–2 (match suspended)
      - **Francesca Schiavone** (ITA) [6] def. Jelena Dokić (AUS) 6–4, 1–6, 6–3

=== June 19, 2011 (Sunday) ===
==== Athletics ====
- European Team Championships Super League in Stockholm, Sweden:
  - Men:
    - Hammer: Markus Esser (GER) 79.28m
    - 110m hurdles: Andy Turner (GBR) 13.42
    - Pole vault: Maksym Mazuryk (UKR) 5.72m
    - 800m: Adam Kszczot (POL) 1:46.50
    - Discus: Robert Harting (GER) 65.63m
    - 3000m: Juan Carlos Higuero (ESP) 8:03.43
    - Triple jump: Fabrizio Schembri (ITA) 16.95m
    - 200m: Christophe Lemaitre (FRA) 20.28
    - 3000m steeplechase: Vincent Zouaoui-Dandrieux (FRA) 8:30.85
    - 4 × 400 m: Russia (Maksim Dyldin, Dmitry Buryak, Pavel Trenikhin, Denis Alekseyev) 3:02.42
  - Women:
    - Shot put: Nadine Kleinert (GER) 17.81m
    - Long jump: Darya Klishina (RUS) 6.74m
    - 200m: Mariya Ryemyen (UKR) 23.10
    - High jump: Emma Green (SWE) 1.89m
    - 100m hurdles: Tatyana Dektyareva (RUS) 13.16
    - 1500m: Charlene Thomas (GBR) 4:06.85
    - Discus: Kateryna Karsak (UKR) 63.35m
    - 5000m: Dolores Checa (ESP) 15:16.89
    - 4 × 400 m: Russia (Kseniya Vdovina, Ksenia Zadorina, Tatyana Firova, Lyudmila Litvinova) 3:27.17
  - Final standings: (1) Russia 385 points (2) Germany 331.5 (3) Ukraine 304
    - Russia win the title for the second successive time.

==== Auto racing ====
- Sprint Cup Series:
  - Heluva Good! Sour Cream Dips 400 in Brooklyn, Michigan: (1) (Virginia) Denny Hamlin (Toyota; Joe Gibbs Racing) (2) (Wisconsin) Matt Kenseth (Ford; Roush Fenway Racing) (3) (Nevada) Kyle Busch (Toyota; Joe Gibbs Racing)
    - Drivers' championship standings (after 15 of 36 races): (1) (Missouri) Carl Edwards (Ford; Roush Fenway Racing) 532 points (2) (California) Kevin Harvick (Chevrolet; Richard Childress Racing) 512 (3) (North Carolina) Dale Earnhardt Jr. (Chevrolet; Hendrick Motorsports) 505
- IndyCar Series:
  - Milwaukee 225 in West Allis, Wisconsin: (1) Dario Franchitti (GBR) (Chip Ganassi Racing) (2) Graham Rahal (USA) (Chip Ganassi Racing) (3) Oriol Servià (ESP) (Newman/Haas Racing)
    - Franchitti's 29th victory in American open-wheel racing moves him into a tie for ninth on the all-time list, with Rick Mears.
    - Drivers' championship standings (after 8 of 18 races): (1) Will Power (AUS) (Team Penske) & Franchitti 271 points (3) Servià 198
- V8 Supercars:
  - Skycity Triple Crown in Darwin, Northern Territory:
    - Race 13: (1) Shane van Gisbergen (NZL) (Stone Brothers Racing, Ford FG Falcon) (2) Craig Lowndes (AUS) (Triple Eight Race Engineering, Holden VE Commodore) (3) Mark Winterbottom (AUS) (Ford Performance Racing, Ford FG Falcon)
      - Drivers' championship standings (after 13 of 28 races): (1) Jamie Whincup (AUS) (Triple Eight Race Engineering, Holden VE Commodore) 1395 points (2) Lowndes 1239 (3) Van Gisbergen 1134
- World Rally Championship:
  - Acropolis Rally of Greece in Loutraki, Greece: (1) Sébastien Ogier (FRA)/Julien Ingrassia (FRA) (Citroën DS3 WRC) (2) Sébastien Loeb (FRA)/Daniel Elena (MON) (Citroën DS3 WRC) (3) Mikko Hirvonen (FIN)/Jarmo Lehtinen (FIN) (Ford Fiesta RS WRC)
    - Drivers' championship standings (after 7 of 13 rallies): (1) Loeb 146 points (2) Hirvonen 129 (3) Ogier 124
- World Touring Car Championship:
  - Race of the Czech Republic in Brno:
    - Race 1: (1) Rob Huff (GBR) (Chevrolet; Chevrolet Cruze) (2) Yvan Muller (FRA) (Chevrolet; Chevrolet Cruze) (3) Alain Menu (SUI) (Chevrolet; Chevrolet Cruze)
    - Race 2: (1) Muller (2) Tom Coronel (NED) (ROAL Motorsport; BMW 320 TC) (3) Menu
      - Drivers' championship standings (after 5 of 12 rounds): (1) Huff 187 points (2) Muller 162 (3) Menu 134

==== Badminton ====
- BWF Super Series:
  - Singapore Super Series in Singapore:
    - Men's singles: **Chen Jin** (CHN) def. Lin Dan (CHN) walkover
    - Women's singles: **Wang Xin** (CHN) def. Tine Baun (DEN) 21–19, 21–17
    - Men's doubles: **Cai Yun** (CHN)/**Fu Haifeng** (CHN) def. Alvent Yulianto Chandra (INA)/Hendra Aprida Gunawan (INA) 21–17, 21–13
    - Women's doubles: **Tian Qing** (CHN)/Zhao Yunlei (CHN) def. Ha Jung-eun (KOR)/Kim Min-jung (KOR) 21–13, 21–16
    - Mixed doubles: **Tontowi Ahmad** (INA)/**Liliyana Natsir** (INA) def. Chen Hung-ling (TPE)/Cheng Wen-hsing (TPE) 21–14, 27–25

==== Basketball ====
- EuroBasket Women in Poland (teams in **bold** advance to the Main round):
  - Group A in Bydgoszcz:
    - Slovakia 60–76 **Turkey**
    - **Lithuania** 76–64 **Russia**
      - Standings (after 2 games): Lithuania 4 points, Turkey, Russia 3, Slovak Republic 2.
  - Group B in Bydgoszcz:
    - Israel 41–68 **Belarus**
    - Great Britain 45–60 **Czech Republic**
      - Standings (after 2 games): Belarus, Czech Republic 4 points, Great Britain, Israel 2.
  - Group C in Katowice:
    - **Montenegro** 66–57 **Spain**
    - Germany 60–75 **Poland**
      - Standings (after 2 games): Montenegro 4 points, Spain, Poland 3, Germany 2.
  - Group D in Katowice:
    - Croatia 65–63 Greece
    - Latvia 59–56 (OT) France
      - Standings (after 2 games): France, Greece, Latvia, Croatia 3 points.
- (Italy) Lega Basket Serie A Finals, Game 5: Montepaschi Siena 63–61 Bennet Cantù. **Montepaschi Siena win best-of-7 series 4–1**.
  - Montepaschi Siena win the championship for the fifth successive time and sixth time overall.

==== Beach volleyball ====
- World Championships in Rome, Italy:
  - Men's:
    - Bronze medal Match: Pļaviņš–Šmēdiņš (LAT) 1–2 (bronze) **Brink–Reckermann** (GER)
    - Gold medal Match: (silver) Araújo–Ricardo (BRA) 0–2 (gold) **Emanuel–Alison** (BRA)
      - Emanuel wins his third title after a break of 8 years, while Alison wins for the first time.
  - Women's:
    - Bronze medal Match: (bronze) **Xue–Zhang** (CHN) 2–0 Klapalová–Hajecková (CZE)
    - Gold medal Match: (silver) May-Treanor–Walsh (USA) 1–2 (gold) **Larissa–Juliana** (BRA)
      - Larissa and Juliana defeat 3-times winners May-Treanor and Walsh to win their first title.

==== Canoeing ====
- Sprint European Championships in Belgrade, Serbia:
  - Men:
    - C-1 500m: Valentyn Demyanenko (AZE) 1:50.681 (silver) Paweł Baraszkiewicz (POL) 1:50.693 (bronze) Dzianis Harazha (BLR) 1:50.939
    - K-1 500m: Yury Postrigay (RUS) 1:39.418 (silver) Anders Gustafsson (SWE) 1:39.532 (bronze) Kasper Bleibach (DEN) 1:39.550
    - C-2 500m: Romania (Alexandru Dumitrescu, Victor Mihalachi) 1:41.641 (silver) Azerbaijan (Sergiy Bezugliy, Maksym Prokopenko) 1:41.689 (bronze) Poland (Roman Rynkiewicz, Mariusz Kruk) 1:41.959
    - K-2 500m: Belarus (Raman Piatrushenka, Vadzim Makhneu) 1:30.355 (silver) Slovakia (Erik Vlček, Peter Gelle) 1:30.601 (bronze) Portugal (Emanuel Silva, João Ribeiro) 1:30.739
    - K-1 200m: Piotr Siemionowski (POL) 35.418 (silver) Péter Molnár (HUN) 35.460 (bronze) Ed McKeever (GBR) 35.538
    - C-1 200m: Demyanenko (AZE) 39.855 (silver) Alfonso Benavides López de Ayala (ESP) 40.047 (bronze) Yuriy Cheban (UKR) 40.161
    - K-2 200m: United Kingdom (Liam Heath, Jon Schofield) 32.487 (silver) Belarus (Piatrushenka, Makhneu) 32.775 (bronze) Sweden (Anders Svensson, Christian Svanqvist) 32.793
    - C-2 200m: Lithuania (Raimundas Labuckas, Tomas Gadeikis) 37.416 (silver) Belarus (Aleksandr Vauchetskiy, Dzmitry Rabchanka) 37.866 (bronze) Hungary (Attila Bozsik, Gábor Horváth) 37.914
    - C-1 5000m: Sebastian Brendel (GER) 24:07.383 (silver) José Luis Bouza (ESP) 24:15.819 (bronze) Lukáš Koranda (CZE) 24:28.725
    - K-1 5000m: Aleh Yurenia (BLR) 20:45.612 (silver) Eirik Verås Larsen (NOR) 20:45.966 (bronze) René Holten Poulsen (DEN) 21:04.908
  - Women:
    - C-2 500m: Belarus (Katsiaryna Herasimenka, Svitlana Tulupava) 2:14.554 (silver) Hungary (Kincso Takacs, Dorina Obermayer) 2:14.554 (bronze) Russia (Vetra Bardak, Anastasia Ganina) 2:14.554
    - K-1 500m: Danuta Kozák (HUN) 1:51.552 (silver) Inna Osypenko-Radomska (UKR) 1:53.154 (bronze) Ewelina Wojnarowska (POL) 1:54.204
    - K-2 500m: Hungary (Tamara Csipes, Katalin Kovács) 1:40.207 (silver) Poland (Aneta Konieczna, Beata Mikołajczyk) 1:40.339 (bronze) Russia (Yuliana Salakhova, Anastasia Sergeeva) 1:41.671
    - K-4 500m: (gold) Belarus (Iryna Pamialova, Nadzeya Papok, Volha Khudzenka, Maryna Paltaran) 1:33.088 (silver) Hungary (Dalma Benedek, Kozák, Anna Karasz, Gabriella Szabó) 1:34.006 (bronze) Germany (Tina Dietze, Carolin Leonhardt, Silke Hoermann, Franziska Weber) 1:34.834
    - C-1 200m: Maria Kazakova (RUS) 50.455 (silver) Lydia Weber (GER) 52.999 (bronze) Herasimenka (BLR) 53.275
    - K-1 200m: Natalia Lobova (RUS) 40.120 (silver) Maria Teresa Portela (ESP) 40.282 (bronze) Teresa Portela (POR) 40.300
    - K-2 200m: Hungary (Kozák, Kovács) 37.820 (silver) Germany (Dietze, Weber) 38.036 (bronze) Belarus (Paltaran, Khudzenka) 38.300
    - K-1 5000m: Paltaran (BLR) 23:12.661 (silver) Lani Belcher (GBR) 23:21.415 (bronze) Ludmila Galushko (UKR) 23:28.315

==== Cricket ====
- Sri Lanka in England:
  - 3rd Test in Southampton, day 4: Sri Lanka 184 & 112/3 (49 overs); England 377/8d (92.4 overs; Ian Bell 119*). Sri Lanka trail by 81 runs with 7 wickets remaining.

==== Cycling ====
- UCI World Tour:
  - Tour de Suisse, Stage 9: (gold) Fabian Cancellara (SUI) (Leopard Trek) 41' 01" (silver) Andreas Klöden (GER) (Team RadioShack) + 9" (bronze) Levi Leipheimer (USA) (Team RadioShack) + 13"
    - Final general classification: (1) Leipheimer 31h 45' 02" (2) Damiano Cunego (ITA) (Lampre–ISD) + 4" (3) Steven Kruijswijk (NED) (Rabobank) + 1' 02"
    - UCI World Tour standings (after 16 of 27 races): (1) Philippe Gilbert (BEL) (Omega Pharma–Lotto) 356 points (2) Alberto Contador (ESP) (Saxo Bank–SunGard) 349 (3) Michele Scarponi (ITA) (Lampre–ISD) 348

==== Equestrianism ====
- Eventing – Luhmühlen Horse Trials (CCI 4*) in Salzhausen: (gold) Andreas Dibowski (GER) on Butts Leon (silver) Sandra Auffarth (GER) on Opgun Louvo (bronze) Frank Ostholt (GER) on Little Paint

==== Football (soccer) ====
- CONCACAF Gold Cup in the United States:
  - Quarterfinals in Washington, D.C.:
    - Jamaica 0–2 **United States**
    - **Panama** 1–1 (5–3 pen.) El Salvador
- UEFA European Under-21 Championship in Denmark (teams in **bold** advance to the semifinals):
  - Group B:
    - England 1–2 **Czech Republic** in Viborg
    - Ukraine 0–3 **Spain** in Herning
      - Final standings: Spain 7 points, Czech Republic 6, England 2, Ukraine 1.
- FIFA U-17 World Cup in Mexico:
  - Group C in Pachuca:
    - Rwanda 0–2 England
    - Uruguay 3–0 Canada
  - Group D in Torreón:
    - Uzbekistan 1–4 New Zealand
    - United States 3–0 Czech Republic
- Friendly women's internationals (top 10 in FIFA Women's World Rankings):
  - (5) Sweden 0–4 (1) United States
- CAF Confederation Cup Play-off for group stage, second leg (first leg score in parentheses):
  - **Motema Pembe** (Democratic Republic of the Congo) 2–0 (0–1) (Tanzania) Simba. Motema Pembe win 2–1 on aggregate.

==== Golf ====
- Men's majors:
  - U.S. Open in Bethesda, Maryland, United States:
    - Leaderboard after final round: (1) Rory McIlroy (NIR) 268 (−16) (2) Jason Day (AUS) 276 (−8) (T3) Kevin Chappell (USA), Robert Garrigus (USA), Lee Westwood (ENG) & Y. E. Yang (KOR) 278 (−6)
      - McIlroy wins his first major, setting records for the lowest 72-hole score both in absolute terms and in relation to par at the U.S. Open. He becomes the third Northern Irish player to win a major after Fred Daly at the 1947 Open Championship and Graeme McDowell at the 2010 U.S. Open.
- European Tour:
  - Saint-Omer Open in Saint-Omer, France:
    - Winner: Matthew Zions (AUS) 276 (−8)
      - Zions wins his first European Tour title.

==== Motorcycle racing ====
- Superbike:
  - Aragon World Championship round in Alcañiz, Spain:
    - Race 1: (1) Marco Melandri (ITA) (Yamaha YZF-R1) (2) Max Biaggi (ITA) (Aprilia RSV4) (3) Leon Camier (GBR) (Aprilia RSV4)
    - Race 2: (1) Biaggi (2) Melandri (3) Carlos Checa (ESP) (Ducati 1198)
      - Riders' championship standings (after 7 of 13 rounds): (1) Checa 261 points (2) Biaggi 218 (3) Melandri 195
- Supersport:
  - Aragon World Championship round in Alcañiz, Spain: (1) Chaz Davies (GBR) (Yamaha YZF-R6) (2) Sam Lowes (GBR) (Honda CBR600RR) (3) David Salom (ESP) (Kawasaki Ninja ZX-6R)
    - Riders' championship standings (after 6 of 12 rounds): (1) Davies 105 points (2) Broc Parkes (AUS) (Kawasaki Ninja ZX-6R) 85 (3) Salom 71

==== Triathlon ====
- ITU World Championships, Leg 3 in Kitzbühel, Austria:
  - Men: (gold) Alistair Brownlee (GBR) 1:51:54 (silver) Alexander Brukhankov (RUS) 1:52:38 (bronze) Sven Riederer (SUI) 1:52:59
    - Standings (after 3 of 6 legs): (1) Alistair Brownlee 1690 points (2) Brukhankov 1663 (3) Javier Gómez (ESP) 1485
  - Women: (gold) Paula Findlay (CAN) 2:05:52 (silver) Helen Jenkins (GBR) 2:05:56 (bronze) Sarah Groff (USA) 2:06:27
    - Standings (after 3 of 6 legs): (1) Findlay 2400 points (2) Barbara Riveros Diaz (CHI) 1912 (3) Andrea Hewitt (NZL) 1685

==== Volleyball ====
- FIVB World League, Week 4 (team in **bold** advances to the final round):
  - Pool A: Brazil 3–0 Puerto Rico
    - Standings (after 8 matches): Brazil 21 points, United States 15, **Poland** 12, Puerto Rico 0.
  - Pool B:
    - Russia 3–0 Japan
    - Germany 1–3 Bulgaria
      - Standings (after 8 matches): Russia 24 points, Bulgaria 13, Germany 8, Japan 3.
  - Pool C: Argentina 3–0 Portugal
    - Standings (after 8 matches): Argentina 20 points, Serbia 13, Finland 8, Portugal 7.
  - Pool D: South Korea 0–3 Cuba
    - Standings (after 8 matches): Italy 19 points, Cuba 15, South Korea 10, France 4.
- Men's European League, Leg 4:
  - Pool A:
    - Slovenia 0–3 Great Britain
    - Belgium 3–2 Croatia
      - Standings (after 8 matches): Slovenia 20 points, Belgium 12, Great Britain, Croatia 8.
  - Pool B: Austria 3–1 Netherlands
    - Standings (after 8 matches): Spain 21 points, Netherlands 17, Greece 7, Austria 3.
  - Pool C: Belarus 3–1 Slovakia
    - Standings (after 8 matches): Romania 18 points, Slovakia 15, Belarus 10, Turkey 5.
- Women's European League, Leg 4:
  - Pool C: Croatia 1–3 Belarus
    - Standings (after 8 matches): Turkey 21 points, Romania 14, Belarus 12, Croatia 1.

=== June 18, 2011 (Saturday) ===
==== Athletics ====
- European Team Championships Super League in Stockholm, Sweden:
  - Men:
    - 400m hurdles: David Greene (GBR) 49.21
    - Shot put: David Storl (GER) 20.81m
    - Long jump: Aleksandr Menkov (RUS) 8.20m
    - 400m: Maksim Dyldin (RUS) 45.82
    - High jump: Dmytro Dem'yanyuk (UKR) 2.35m
    - 100m: Christophe Lemaitre (FRA) 9.95
    - 1500m: Manuel Olmedo (ESP) 3:38.63
    - Javelin: Dmytro Kosynskyy (UKR) 81.29m
    - 5000m: Jesús España (ESP) 13:39.25
    - 4 × 100 m: Great Britain (Christian Malcolm, Craig Pickering, James Ellington, Harry Aikines-Aryeetey) 38.60
  - Women:
    - Hammer: Betty Heidler (GER) 73.43m
    - Pole vault: Anna Rogowska (POL) 4.75m
    - 100m: Véronique Mang (FRA) 11.23
    - Javelin: Christina Obergföll (GER) 66.22m
    - 800m: Mariya Savinova (RUS) 1:58.75
    - 3000m: Olesya Syreva (RUS) 8:53.20
    - 400m hurdles: Zuzana Hejnová (CZE) 53.87
    - Triple jump: Olha Saladukha (UKR) 14.85m
    - 3000m steeplechase: Gulnara Samitova-Galkina (RUS) 9:31.20
    - 400m: Antonina Yefremova (UKR) 51.02
    - 4 × 100 m: Ukraine (Olesya Povh, Nataliya Pohrebnyak, Mariya Ryemyen, Hrystyna Stuy) 42.85
  - Standings after day 1: (1) Russia 213 points (2) Germany 183.5 (3) Great Britain 166.

==== Auto racing ====
- Nationwide Series:
  - Alliance Truck Parts 250 in Brooklyn, Michigan: (1) (Missouri) Carl Edwards (Ford; Roush Fenway Racing) (2) (Mississippi) Ricky Stenhouse Jr. (Ford; Roush Fenway Racing) (3) (Nevada) Kyle Busch (Toyota; Joe Gibbs Racing)
    - Drivers' championship standings (after 15 of 34 races): (1) Stenhouse Jr. 525 points (2) (Virginia) Elliott Sadler (Chevrolet; Kevin Harvick Incorporated) 523 (3) (Georgia (U.S. state)) Reed Sorenson (Chevrolet; Turner Motorsports) 521
- V8 Supercars:
  - Skycity Triple Crown in Darwin, Northern Territory:
    - Race 12: (1) Rick Kelly (AUS) (Kelly Racing, Holden VE Commodore) (2) Steven Johnson (AUS) (Dick Johnson Racing, Ford FG Falcon) (3) Craig Lowndes (AUS) (Triple Eight Race Engineering, Holden VE Commodore)
      - Drivers' championship standings (after 12 of 28 races): (1) Jamie Whincup (AUS) (Triple Eight Race Engineering, Holden VE Commodore) 1293 points (2) Lowndes 1101 (3) Kelly 1037

==== Basketball ====
- EuroBasket Women in Poland:
  - Group A in Bydgoszcz:
    - Turkey 58–64 Lithuania
    - Russia 68–66 Slovakia
  - Group B in Bydgoszcz:
    - Belarus 55–40 Great Britain
    - Czech Republic 72–56 Israel
  - Group C in Katowice:
    - Spain 79–69 Germany
    - Poland 53–70 Montenegro
  - Group D in Katowice:
    - Greece 67–57 Latvia
    - France 86–40 Croatia
- (Germany) Bundesliga Finals, Game 5: Brose Baskets 72–65 Alba Berlin. **Brose Baskets win best-of-5 series 3–2.**
  - Brose Baskets win the championship for the second successive time and fourth time overall.

==== Canoeing ====
- Sprint European Championships in Belgrade, Serbia:
  - Men:
    - K-1 1000 m: (gold) Max Hoff (GER) 3:22.485 (silver) Aleh Yurenia (BLR) 3:25.029 (bronze) Fernando Pimenta (POR) 3:25.881
    - C-1 1000 m: (gold) Sebastian Brendel (GER) 3:47.155 (silver) Josif Chirilă (ROM) 3:49.645 (bronze) José Luis Bouza (ESP) 3:50.065
    - K-2 1000 m: (gold) Germany (Andreas Ihle, Martin Hollstein) 3:07.095 (silver) Russia (Vitaly Yurchenko, Vasily Pogreban) 3:07.827 (bronze) Hungary (Roland Kökény, Rudolf Dombi) 3:08.205
    - C-2 1000 m: (gold) Russia (Alexey Korovashkov, Ilya Pervukhin) 3:28.584 (silver) Belarus (Andrei Bahdanovich, Aliaksandr Bahdanovich) 3:28.614 (bronze) Romania (Victor Mihalachi, Liviu Alexandru Dumitrescu Lazăr) 3:28.818
    - K-4 1000 m: (gold) Portugal (Pimenta, João Ribeiro, Emanuel Silva, David Fernandes) 2:49.618 (silver) Germany (Hoff, Marcus Gross, Norman Bröckl, Robert Gleinert) 2:49.960 (bronze) Romania (Ionel Gavrila, Ştefan Vasile, Toni Ioneticu, Traian Neagu) 2:50.056
    - C-4 1000 m: (gold) Hungary (Márton Tóth, Mátyás Sáfrán, Mihaly Sáfrán, Róbert Mike) 3:16.042 (silver) Belarus (Andrei Bahdanovich, Dzmitry Rabchanka, Aliaksandr Bahdanovich, Aleksandr Vauchetskiy) 3:16.270 (bronze) Russia (Ivan Kuznetsov, Rasul Ishmukhamedov, Kirill Shamshurin, Vladimir Chernyshkov) 3:16.528
  - Women:
    - K-1 1000 m: (gold) Katalin Kovács (HUN) 3:55.232 (silver) Antonija Nadj (SRB) 3:57.716 (bronze) Edyta Dzieniszewska (POL) 4:02.732
    - K-2 1000 m: (gold) Hungary (Tamara Csipes, Gabriella Szabó) 3:31.741 (silver) Germany (Franziska Weber, Tina Dietze) 3:32.629 (bronze) Russia (Anastasia Sergeeva, Yuliana Salakhova) 3:34.927

==== Cricket ====
- Sri Lanka in England:
  - 3rd Test in Southampton, day 3: Sri Lanka 184 (64.2 overs; Chris Tremlett 6/48); England 195/4 (48 overs). England lead by 11 runs with 6 wickets remaining in the 1st innings.

==== Cycling ====
- UCI World Tour:
  - Tour de Suisse, Stage 8: (gold) Peter Sagan (SVK) (Liquigas–Cannondale) 3h 52' 00" (silver) Matthew Goss (AUS) (HTC–Highroad) s.t. (bronze) Ben Swift (GBR) (Team Sky) s.t.
    - General classification (after stage 8): (1) Damiano Cunego (ITA) (Lampre–ISD) 31h 01' 49" (2) Steven Kruijswijk (NED) (Rabobank) + 1' 36" (3) Fränk Schleck (LUX) (Leopard Trek) + 1' 41"

==== Equestrianism ====
- FEI Nations Cup Show Jumping – Promotional League, Europe:
  - FEI Nations Cup of Norway in Drammen (CSIO 3*): (gold) Switzerland (Arthur Gustavo da Silva, Niklaus Schurtenberger, Claudia Gisler, Christina Liebherr) (silver) Turkey (Gerry Flynn, Çağrı Başel, Omer Karaevli, Burak Azak) (bronze) Poland (Msciwoj Kiecon, Piotr Sawicki, Antoni Tomaszewski)
    - Standings (after 4 of 6 events): (1) Switzerland 40.5 points (2) Sweden 35 (3) Italy 32.5

==== Football (soccer) ====
- CONCACAF Gold Cup in the United States:
  - Quarterfinals in East Rutherford:
    - Costa Rica 1–1 (2–4 pen.) **Honduras**
    - **Mexico** 2–1 Guatemala
- Friendly women's internationals (top 10 in FIFA Women's World Rankings):
  - (4) Japan 1–1 South Korea
  - (7) France 7–0 Belgium
- UEFA European Under-21 Championship in Denmark (teams in **bold** advance to the semifinals):
  - Group A:
    - Iceland 3–1 Denmark in Aalborg
    - **Switzerland** 3–0 **Belarus** in Aarhus
      - Final standings: Switzerland 9 points, Belarus, Iceland, Denmark 3.
- FIFA U-17 World Cup in Mexico:
  - Group A in Morelia:
    - Mexico 3–1 North Korea
    - Congo 1–0 Netherlands
  - Group B in Monterrey:
    - France 3–0 Argentina
    - Japan 1–0 Jamaica
- (Colombia) Categoría Primera A Campeonato Apertura Finals, second leg (first leg score in parentheses):
  - **Atlético Nacional** 2–1 (1–2) La Equidad. 3–3 on aggregate; Atlético Nacional win 3–2 on penalties.
    - Atlético win the title for the eleventh time.

==== Golf ====
- Men's majors:
  - U.S. Open in Bethesda, Maryland, United States:
    - Leaderboard after third round: (1) Rory McIlroy (NIR) 199 (−14) (2) Y. E. Yang (KOR) 207 (−6) (T3) Jason Day (AUS), Robert Garrigus (USA) & Lee Westwood (ENG) 208 (−5)
- The Amateur Championship in Southport, England:
  - Final: **Bryden Macpherson** (AUS) def. Michael Stewart (SCO) 3 & 2
    - Macpherson becomes the second Australian to win the title, after Doug Bachli in 1954.

==== Mixed martial arts ====
- Strikeforce: Overeem vs. Werdum in Dallas, Texas, United States:
  - Heavyweight Grand Prix Quarterfinal bout: **Alistair Overeem** (NED) def. Fabrício Werdum (BRA) via unanimous decision
  - Heavyweight Grand Prix Quarterfinal bout: **Josh Barnett** (USA) def. Brett Rogers (USA) via submission (arm triangle choke)
  - Lightweight bout: **Jorge Masvidal** (USA) def. K. J. Noons (USA) via unanimous decision
  - Heavyweight bout: **Daniel Cormier** (USA) def. Jeff Monson (USA) via unanimous decision
  - Heavyweight bout: **Chad Griggs** (USA) def. Valentijn Overeem (NED) via submission (strikes)

==== Rugby union ====
- IRB Junior World Championship in Italy (teams in **bold** advance to the semi-finals):
  - Pool A:
    - Italy 6–56 Wales in Treviso
    - Argentina 15–48 **New Zealand** in Padua
      - Final standings: New Zealand 15 points, Wales 10, Argentina 4, Italy 0.
  - Pool B:
    - Fiji 36–18 Tonga in Rovigo
    - **Australia** 25–31 **France** in Treviso
      - Final standings: France 14 points, Australia 11, Fiji 5, Tonga 0.
  - Pool C:
    - **England** 26–20 South Africa in Padua
    - Ireland 30–13 Scotland in Rovigo
      - Final standings: England 14 points, South Africa 11, Ireland 4, Scotland 0.

==== Tennis ====
- ATP World Tour:
  - UNICEF Open in 's-Hertogenbosch, Netherlands:
    - Final: **Dmitry Tursunov** (RUS) def. Ivan Dodig (CRO) 6–3, 6–2
      - Tursunov wins the seventh title of his career.
  - Aegon International in Eastbourne, United Kingdom:
    - Final: **Andreas Seppi** (ITA) def. Janko Tipsarević (SRB) 7–6(7–5), 3–6, 5–3 retired
      - Seppi wins the first title of his career.
- WTA Tour:
  - UNICEF Open in 's-Hertogenbosch, Netherlands:
    - Final: **Roberta Vinci** (ITA) def. Jelena Dokić (AUS) 6–7(7–9), 6–3, 7–5
      - Vinci wins the fifth title of her career and second of the year.
  - Aegon International in Eastbourne, United Kingdom:
    - Final: **Marion Bartoli** (FRA) def. Petra Kvitová (CZE) 6–1, 4–6, 7–5
      - Bartoli wins the sixth title of her career, and her second Premier-level title.

==== Volleyball ====
- FIVB World League, Week 4 (team in **bold** advances to the final round):
  - Pool A:
    - Brazil 3–0 Puerto Rico
    - United States 3–1 **Poland**
      - Standings: Brazil 18 points (7 matches), United States 15 (8), Poland 12 (8), Puerto Rico 0 (7).
  - Pool B:
    - Russia 3–0 Japan
    - Germany 3–2 Bulgaria
      - Standings (after 7 matches): Russia 21 points, Bulgaria 10, Germany 8, Japan 3.
  - Pool C:
    - Finland 3–2 Serbia
    - Argentina 3–1 Portugal
      - Standings: Argentina 17 points (7 matches), Serbia 13 (8), Finland 8 (8), Portugal 7 (7).
  - Pool D:
    - South Korea 0–3 Cuba
    - Italy 3–1 France
      - Standings: Italy 19 points (8 matches), Cuba 12 (7), South Korea 10 (7), France 4 (8).
- Men's European League, Leg 4:
  - Pool A:
    - Slovenia 3–1 Great Britain
    - Belgium 3–2 Croatia
      - Standings (after 7 matches): Slovenia 20 points, Belgium 10, Croatia 7, Great Britain 5.
  - Pool B:
    - Austria 1–3 Netherlands
    - Spain 3–0 Greece
      - Standings: Spain 21 points (8 matches), Netherlands 17 (7), Greece 7 (8), Austria 0 (7).
  - Pool C:
    - Romania 3–0 Turkey
    - Belarus 0–3 Slovakia
      - Standings: Romania 18 points (8 matches), Slovakia 15 (7), Belarus 7 (7), Turkey 5 (8).
- Women's European League, Leg 4:
  - Pool A:
    - Spain 3–0 Greece
    - France 1–3 Serbia
      - Standings (after 8 matches): Serbia 23 points, Spain 13, France 10, Greece 2.
  - Pool B:
    - Hungary 2–3 Czech Republic
    - Israel 0–3 Bulgaria
      - Standings (after 8 matches): Bulgaria 20 points, Czech Republic 18, Hungary 6, Israel 4.
  - Pool C:
    - Romania 0–3 Turkey
    - Croatia 2–3 Belarus
      - Standings: Turkey 21 points (8 matches), Romania 14 (8), Belarus 9 (7), Croatia 1 (7).
- Men's Pan-American Cup in Gatineau, Canada:
  - Classification 7–8: **Argentina** 3–1 Dominican Republic
  - Classification 5–6: Venezuela 0–3 **Mexico**
  - Classification 3–4: (bronze) **Canada** 3–0 Puerto Rico
  - Final: (gold) **Brazil** 3–1 (silver) United States
    - Brazil win the Cup for the first time.

=== June 17, 2011 (Friday) ===
==== Basketball ====
- (Turkey) Turkish League Finals, Game 4: Galatasaray 88–91 Fenerbahçe Ülker. **Fenerbahçe Ülker win best-of-7 series 4–2**.
  - Fenerbahçe Ülker win the title for the fourth time in five years, and fifth time overall.

==== Cricket ====
- Sri Lanka in England:
  - 3rd Test in Southampton, day 2: Sri Lanka 177/9 (61.2 overs; Chris Tremlett 6/42); England.

==== Cycling ====
- UCI World Tour:
  - Tour de Suisse, Stage 7: (gold) Thomas De Gendt (BEL) (Vacansoleil–DCM) 5h 38' 42" (silver) Andy Schleck (LUX) (Leopard Trek) + 35" (bronze) José Joaquín Rojas (ESP) (Movistar Team) + 48"
    - General classification (after stage 7): (1) Damiano Cunego (ITA) (Lampre–ISD) 27h 09' 49" (2) Bauke Mollema (NED) (Rabobank) + 1' 23" (3) Steven Kruijswijk (NED) (Rabobank) + 1' 36"

==== Football (soccer) ====
- Friendly women's internationals (top 10 in FIFA Women's World Rankings):
  - (1) United States 2–3 (9) Norway

==== Golf ====
- Men's majors:
  - U.S. Open in Bethesda, Maryland, United States:
    - Leaderboard after second day (USA unless stated): (1) Rory McIlroy (NIR) 131 (−11) (2) Y. E. Yang (KOR) 137 (−5) (T3) Sergio García (ESP), Robert Garrigus, Zach Johnson, Matt Kuchar & Brandt Snedeker 140 (−2)
      - 21 players will complete their second rounds on June 18, due to rain and electrical disturbances.

==== Volleyball ====
- FIVB World League, Week 4 (team in **bold** advances to the final round):
  - Pool A: United States 0–3 **Poland**
    - Standings: Brazil 15 points (6 matches), Poland, United States 12 (7), Puerto Rico 0 (6).
  - Pool C: Finland 2–3 Serbia
    - Standings: Argentina 14 points (6 matches), Serbia 12 (7), Portugal 7 (6), Finland 6 (7).
  - Pool D: Italy 1–3 France
    - Standings: Italy 16 points (7 matches), South Korea 10 (6), Cuba 9 (6), France 4 (7).
- Men's European League, Leg 4:
  - Pool B: Spain 3–0 Greece
    - Standings: Spain 18 points (7 matches), Netherlands 14 (6), Greece 7 (7), Austria 0 (6).
  - Pool C: Romania 3–0 Turkey
    - Standings: Romania 15 points (7 matches), Slovakia 12 (6), Belarus 7 (6), Turkey 5 (7).
- Women's European League, Leg 4:
  - Pool A:
    - Spain 3–0 Greece
    - France 0–3 Serbia
      - Standings (after 7 matches): Serbia 20 points, France, Spain 10, Greece 2.
  - Pool B:
    - Israel 1–3 Bulgaria
    - Hungary 0–3 Czech Republic
      - Standings (after 7 matches): Bulgaria 17 points, Czech Republic 16, Hungary 5, Israel 4.
  - Pool C: Romania 3–1 Turkey
    - Standings: Turkey 18 points (7 matches), Romania 14 (7), Belarus 7 (6), Croatia 0 (6).
- Men's Pan-American Cup in Gatineau, Canada:
  - Classification 9–10: Panama 1–3 Bahamas
  - Classification 5–8:
    - Argentina 1–3 **Venezuela**
    - **Mexico** 3–0 Dominican Republic
  - Semifinals:
    - **Brazil** 3–0 Canada
    - **United States** 3–0 Puerto Rico

=== June 16, 2011 (Thursday) ===
==== Basketball ====
- (Russia) Russian Professional League Finals, Game 4: Khimki Moscow 63–74 CSKA Moscow. **CSKA Moscow win best-of-5 series 3–1.**
  - CSKA Moscow win the Russian championship for the eighth successive time and the 18th time in 20 years.

==== Cricket ====
- Sri Lanka in England:
  - 3rd Test in Southampton, day 1: Sri Lanka 81/4 (38 overs); England.
- India in the West Indies:
  - 5th ODI in Kingston, Jamaica: India 251 (47.3 overs); West Indies 255/3 (48.4 overs). **West Indies win by 7 wickets; India win 5-match series 3–2.**

==== Cycling ====
- UCI World Tour:
  - Tour de Suisse, Stage 6: (gold) Steven Kruijswijk (NED) (Rabobank) 4h 12' 03" (silver) Levi Leipheimer (USA) (Team RadioShack) + 9" (bronze) Damiano Cunego (ITA) (Lampre–ISD) + 18"
    - General classification (after stage 6): (1) Cunego 21h 26' 28" (2) Bauke Mollema (NED) (Rabobank) + 1' 23" (3) Kruijswijk + 1' 36"

==== Football (soccer) ====
- Friendly women's internationals (top 10 in FIFA Women's World Rankings):
  - (2) Germany 3–0 (9) Norway
  - (3) Brazil – Argentina — cancelled due to air travel disruption caused by the Puyehue eruption.
  - (5) Sweden 2–0 Mexico

==== Golf ====
- Men's majors:
  - U.S. Open in Bethesda, Maryland, United States:
    - Leaderboard after first round: (1) Rory McIlroy (NIR) 65 (−6) (T2) Charl Schwartzel (RSA) & Y. E. Yang (KOR) 68 (−3)

==== Volleyball ====
- Men's Pan-American Cup in Gatineau, Canada:
  - Classification 5–10:
    - Panama 0–3 **Venezuela**
    - **Dominican Republic** 3–2 Bahamas
  - Quarterfinals:
    - Argentina 1–3 **Puerto Rico**
    - **Canada** 3–1 Mexico

=== June 15, 2011 (Wednesday) ===
==== Cycling ====
- UCI World Tour:
  - Tour de Suisse, Stage 5: (gold) Borut Božič (SLO) (Vacansoleil–DCM) 4h 44' 48" (silver) Óscar Freire (ESP) (Rabobank) s.t. (bronze) Peter Sagan (SVK) (Liquigas–Cannondale) s.t.
    - General classification (after stage 5): (1) Damiano Cunego (ITA) (Lampre–ISD) 17h 14' 11" (2) Mauricio Soler (COL) (Movistar Team) + 54" (3) Bauke Mollema (NED) (Rabobank) + 1' 16"

==== Football (soccer) ====
- 2014 FIFA World Cup qualification (CONCACAF) First round, first leg in Couva, Trinidad and Tobago: Montserrat 2–5 Belize
- UEFA European Under-21 Championship in Denmark:
  - Group B:
    - Czech Republic 0–2 Spain in Viborg
    - Ukraine 0–0 England in Herning
      - Standings (after 2 matches): Spain 4 points, Czech Republic 3, England 2, Ukraine 1.
- Friendly women's internationals (top 10 in FIFA Women's World Rankings):
  - Belgium 1–2 (7) France
  - (5) Sweden 2–5 (9) Norway
- Copa Libertadores Finals, first leg: Peñarol (Uruguay) 0–0 (Brazil) Santos

==== Ice hockey ====
- Stanley Cup Finals (best-of-7 series):
  - Game 7 in Vancouver: Boston Bruins 4, Vancouver Canucks 0. **Bruins win series 4–3.**
    - The Bruins win the championship for the sixth time, and their first since 1972, with goaltender Tim Thomas awarded the Conn Smythe Trophy as the MVP of the playoffs. Patrice Bergeron becomes a member of the Triple Gold Club, adding the Cup to his previous gold medals at the World Championships and Olympics.
    - With the Bruins victory, Boston becomes the first city to win championships in all four major professional leagues (NFL, NBA, MLB and NHL) in the 21st century.

==== Rugby league ====
- State of Origin Series:
  - Game II in Sydney: New South Wales 18–8 Queensland. 3-match series tied 1–1.

==== Volleyball ====
- Men's Pan-American Cup in Gatineau, Canada (teams in **bold** advance to the semifinals; teams in italics advance to quarterfinal playoffs):
  - Group A: **Brazil** 3–0 Venezuela
    - Final standings: Brazil 6 points, Mexico 2, Venezuela 1.
  - Group B: Canada 3–0 Dominican Republic
    - Final standings: Canada 6 points, Puerto Rico 3, Dominican Republic 0.
  - Group C:
    - Panama 3–1 Bahamas
    - **United States** 3–0 Argentina
      - Final standings: United States 9 points, Argentina 6, Panama 3, Bahamas 0.

=== June 14, 2011 (Tuesday) ===
==== Basketball ====
- (Spain) ACB Playoffs Finals Game 3: Bilbao 55–64 Barcelona. **Barcelona win best-of-5 series 3–0**.
  - Barcelona win the title for the 16th time.

==== Cycling ====
- UCI World Tour:
  - Tour de Suisse, Stage 4: (gold) Thor Hushovd (NOR) (Garmin–Cervélo) 4h 46' 05" (silver) Peter Sagan (SVK) (Liquigas–Cannondale) s.t. (bronze) Marco Marcato (ITA) (Vacansoleil–DCM) + 2"
    - General classification (after stage 4): (1) Damiano Cunego (ITA) (Lampre–ISD) 12h 29' 23" (2) Mauricio Soler (COL) (Movistar Team) + 54" (3) Bauke Mollema (NED) (Rabobank) + 1' 16"

==== Football (soccer) ====
- CONCACAF Gold Cup in the United States (teams in **bold** advance to the quarterfinals):
  - Group C in Kansas City:
    - Canada 1–1 **Panama**
    - Guadeloupe 0–1 **United States**
      - Final standings: Panama 7 points, United States 6, Canada 4, Guadeloupe 0.
- UEFA European Under-21 Championship in Denmark:
  - Group A:
    - Switzerland 2–0 Iceland in Aalborg
    - Denmark 2–1 Belarus in Aarhus
      - Standings (after 2 matches): Switzerland 6 points, Denmark, Belarus 3, Iceland 0.
- Friendly women's internationals (top 10 in FIFA Women's World Rankings):
  - (6) Canada 2–0 (8) North Korea

==== Rugby union ====
- IRB Junior World Championship in Italy:
  - Pool A in Rovigo:
    - New Zealand 92–0 Wales
    - Italy 3–27 Argentina
      - Standings (after 2 matches): New Zealand 10 points, Wales 5, Argentina 4, Italy 0.
  - Pool B in Padua:
    - Australia 50–25 Fiji
    - France 27–14 Tonga
      - Standings (after 2 matches): Australia 10 points, France 9, Fiji, Tonga 0.
  - Pool C in Treviso:
    - England 39–18 Scotland
    - Ireland 26–42 South Africa
      - Standings (after 2 matches): South Africa, England 10 points, Ireland, Scotland 0.

==== Volleyball ====
- Men's Pan-American Cup in Gatineau, Canada:
  - Group A: Venezuela 2–3 Mexico
    - Standings: Brazil 3 points (1 match), Mexico 2 (2), Venezuela 1 (1).
  - Group B: Dominican Republic 1–3 Puerto Rico
    - Standings: Canada 3 points (1 match), Puerto Rico 3 (2), Dominican Republic 0 (1).
  - Group C:
    - Argentina 3–0 Bahamas
    - United States 3–0 Panama
      - Standings (after 2 matches): Argentina, United States 6 points, Bahamas, Panama 0.

=== June 13, 2011 (Monday) ===
==== Cricket ====
- India in the West Indies:
  - 4th ODI in North Sound, Antigua: West Indies 249/8 (50 overs); India 146 (39 overs). **West Indies win by 103 runs; India lead 5-match series 3–1.**

==== Cycling ====
- UCI World Tour:
  - Tour de Suisse, Stage 3: (gold) Peter Sagan (SVK) (Liquigas–Cannondale) 3h 09' 47" (silver) Damiano Cunego (ITA) (Lampre–ISD) s.t. (bronze) Jakob Fuglsang (DEN) (Leopard Trek) + 21"
    - General classification (after stage 3): (1) Cunego 7h 43' 16" (2) Mauricio Soler (COL) (Movistar Team) + 54" (3) Bauke Mollema (NED) (Rabobank) + 1' 16"

==== Football (soccer) ====
- CONCACAF Gold Cup in the United States (teams in **bold** advance to the quarterfinals):
  - Group B in Harrison:
    - **Guatemala** 4–0 Grenada
    - **Honduras** 0–1 **Jamaica**
      - Final standings: Jamaica 9 points, Honduras, Guatemala 4, Grenada 0.

==== Ice hockey ====
- Stanley Cup Finals (best-of-7 series):
  - Game 6 in Boston: Boston Bruins 5, Vancouver Canucks 2. Series tied 3–3.

==== Tennis ====
- ATP World Tour:
  - Aegon Championships in London, United Kingdom:
    - Final: **Andy Murray** (GBR) def. Jo-Wilfried Tsonga (FRA) 3–6, 7–6(2), 6–4
      - Murray wins the tournament for the second time after 2009, for his first title of the year and 17th of his career.
- WTA Tour:
  - Aegon Classic in Birmingham, United Kingdom:
    - Final: **Sabine Lisicki** (GER) def. Daniela Hantuchová (SVK) 6–3, 6–2
      - Lisicki wins the second title of her career.

==== Volleyball ====
- Men's Pan-American Cup in Gatineau, Canada:
  - Group A: Brazil 3–0 Mexico
  - Group B: Canada 3–0 Puerto Rico
  - Group C:
    - Argentina 3–0 Panama
    - United States 3–0 Bahamas

=== June 12, 2011 (Sunday) ===
==== Auto racing ====
- Formula One:
  - Canadian Grand Prix in Montreal, Canada: (1) Jenson Button (GBR) (McLaren–Mercedes) (2) Sebastian Vettel (GER) (Red Bull–Renault) (3) Mark Webber (AUS) (Red Bull-Renault)
    - Drivers' championship standings (after 7 of 19 races): (1) Vettel 161 points (2) Button 101 (3) Webber 94
- Sprint Cup Series:
  - 5-hour Energy 500 in Long Pond, Pennsylvania: (1) (California) Jeff Gordon (Chevrolet; Hendrick Motorsports) (2) (Nevada) Kurt Busch (Dodge; Penske Racing) (3) (Nevada) Kyle Busch (Toyota; Joe Gibbs Racing)
    - Gordon wins his 84th career Cup Series race, moving him into a tie with Darrell Waltrip for the most wins in NASCAR's modern era.
    - Drivers' championship standings (after 14 of 36 races): (1) (Missouri) Carl Edwards (Ford; Roush Fenway Racing) 492 points (2) (California) Jimmie Johnson (Chevrolet; Hendrick Motorsports) 486 (3) (North Carolina) Dale Earnhardt Jr. (Chevrolet; Hendrick Motorsports) 482
- Intercontinental Le Mans Cup:
  - 24 Hours of Le Mans in Le Mans, France: (1) (Germany) #2 Audi Sport Team Joest (Marcel Fässler (SUI), André Lotterer (DEU), Benoît Tréluyer (FRA)) (2) #9 Team Peugeot Total (Sébastien Bourdais (FRA), Simon Pagenaud (FRA), Pedro Lamy (POR)) (3) #8 Team Peugeot Total (Stéphane Sarrazin (FRA), Franck Montagny (FRA), Nicolas Minassian (FRA))

==== Basketball ====
- (United States) NBA Finals (best-of-7 series):
  - Game 6 in Miami: Dallas Mavericks 105, Miami Heat 95. **Mavericks win series 4–2.**
    - The Mavericks win the championship for the first time, with their longtime leader Dirk Nowitzki named series MVP.

==== Cycling ====
- UCI World Tour:
  - Critérium du Dauphiné, Stage 7: (gold) Joaquim Rodríguez (ESP) (Team Katusha) 3h 24' 30" (silver) Thibaut Pinot (FRA) (FDJ) + 7" (bronze) Robert Gesink (NED) (Rabobank) + 7"
    - Final general classification: (1) Bradley Wiggins (GBR) (Team Sky) 26h 40' 51" (2) Cadel Evans (AUS) (BMC Racing Team) + 1' 26" (3) Alexander Vinokourov (KAZ) (Astana) + 1' 49"
    - UCI World Tour standings (after 15 of 27 races): (1) Philippe Gilbert (BEL) (Omega Pharma–Lotto) 356 points (2) Alberto Contador (ESP) (Saxo Bank–SunGard) 349 (3) Michele Scarponi (ITA) (Lampre–ISD) 348
  - Tour de Suisse, Stage 2: (gold) Mauricio Soler (COL) (Movistar Team) 4h 23' 20" (silver) Damiano Cunego (ITA) (Lampre–ISD) + 12" (bronze) Fränk Schleck (LUX) (Leopard Trek) + 12"
    - General classification (after stage 2): (1) Soler 4h 33' 19" (2) Cunego + 16" (3) Bauke Mollema (NED) (Rabobank) + 22"

==== Football (soccer) ====
- CONCACAF Gold Cup in the United States (teams in **bold** advance to the quarterfinals):
  - Group A in Chicago:
    - El Salvador 6–1 Cuba
    - **Mexico** 4–1 **Costa Rica**
      - Final standings: Mexico 9 points, Costa Rica, El Salvador 4, Cuba 0.
- UEFA European Under-21 Championship in Denmark:
  - Group B:
    - Czech Republic 2–1 Ukraine in Viborg
    - Spain 1–1 England in Herning
- CAF Confederation Cup Play-off for group stage:
  - Second leg (first leg score in parentheses):
    - **Kaduna United** (Nigeria) 3–0 (0–1) (Algeria) ES Sétif. Kaduna United win 3–1 on aggregate.
    - Sofapaka (Kenya) 3–1 (0–3) (Tunisia) **Club Africain**. Club Africain win 4–3 on aggregate.
  - Only leg: **Sunshine Stars** (Nigeria) 1–0 (Libya) Al-Ittihad
  - First leg: Simba (Tanzania) 1–0 (Democratic Republic of the Congo) Motema Pembe
- (Argentina) Argentine Primera División Torneo Clausura, matchday 18 of 19:
  - Huracán 0–2 Vélez Sarsfield
  - Lanús 0–1 Argentinos Juniors
    - Standings: Vélez Sársfield 36 points, Lanús 32, Godoy Cruz 31.
      - Vélez Sársfield win the title for the eighth time.
- Chilean Primera División Campeonato Apertura Final, second leg (first leg score in parentheses):
  - Universidad Católica 1–4 (2–0) **Universidad de Chile**. Universidad de Chile win 4–3 on aggregate.
    - Universidad de Chile win the title for the 14th time.
- (Colombia) Categoría Primera A Campeonato Apertura Finals, first leg: La Equidad 2–1 Atlético Nacional
- (Uruguay) Uruguayan Primera División Championship playoffs in Montevideo: Defensor Sporting 0–1 **Nacional**
  - Nacional win the title for the 43rd time.

==== Golf ====
- PGA Tour:
  - FedEx St. Jude Classic in Memphis, Tennessee:
    - Winner: Harrison Frazar (USA) 267 (−13)^{PO}
      - Frazar defeats Robert Karlsson (SWE) on the third playoff hole to win his first PGA Tour title.
- European Tour:
  - BMW Italian Open in Turin, Italy:
    - Winner: Robert Rock (ENG) 267 (−21)
      - Rock wins his first European Tour title.
- LPGA Tour:
  - LPGA State Farm Classic in Springfield, Illinois:
    - Winner: Yani Tseng (TWN) 267 (−21)
      - Tseng wins her seventh LPGA Tour title.
- Champions Tour:
  - Greater Hickory Classic at Rock Barn in Conover, North Carolina:
    - Winner: Mark Wiebe (USA) 197 (−19)^{PO}
      - Wiebe defeats James Mason (USA) on the third playoff hole to win his third Champions Tour title.

==== Motorcycle racing ====
- Moto GP:
  - British Grand Prix in Silverstone, United Kingdom:
    - MotoGP: (1) Casey Stoner (AUS) (Honda) (2) Andrea Dovizioso (ITA) (Honda) (3) Colin Edwards (USA) (Yamaha)
      - Riders' championship standings (after 6 of 18 races): (1) Stoner 116 points (2) Jorge Lorenzo (ESP) (Yamaha) 98 (3) Dovizioso 83
    - Moto2: (1) Stefan Bradl (GER) (Kalex) (2) Bradley Smith (GBR) (Tech 3) (3) Michele Pirro (ITA) (Moriwaki)
      - Riders' championship standings (after 6 of 17 races): (1) Bradl 127 points (2) Simone Corsi (ITA) (FTR) 65 (3) Yuki Takahashi (JPN) (Moriwaki) 56
    - 125cc: (1) Jonas Folger (GER) (Aprilia) (2) Johann Zarco (FRA) (Derbi) (3) Héctor Faubel (ESP) (Aprilia)
      - Riders' championship standings (after 6 of 17 races): (1) Nicolás Terol (ESP) (Aprilia) 128 points (2) Folger 93 (3) Zarco 83
- Superbike:
  - Misano World Championship round in Misano Adriatico, Italy:
    - Race 1: (1) Carlos Checa (ESP) (Ducati 1198) (2) Max Biaggi (ITA) (Aprilia RSV4) (3) Marco Melandri (ITA) (Yamaha YZF-R1)
    - Race 2: (1) Checa (2) Biaggi (3) Noriyuki Haga (JPN) (Aprilia RSV4)
      - Riders' championship standings (after 6 of 13 rounds): (1) Checa 245 points (2) Biaggi 173 (3) Melandri 150
- Supersport:
  - Misano World Championship round in Misano Adriatico, Italy: (1) Broc Parkes (AUS) (Kawasaki Ninja ZX-6R) (2) Fabien Foret (FRA) (Honda CBR600RR) (3) Sam Lowes (GBR) (Honda CBR600RR)
    - Riders' championship standings (after 5 of 12 rounds): (1) Parkes 85 points (2) Chaz Davies (GBR) (Yamaha YZF-R6) 80 (3) Luca Scassa (ITA) (Yamaha YZF-R6) 70

==== Tennis ====
- ATP World Tour:
  - Gerry Weber Open in Halle, Germany:
    - Final: **Philipp Kohlschreiber** (GER) def. Philipp Petzschner (GER) 7–6(5), 2–0 retired
      - Kohlschreiber wins the third title of his career.
  - Aegon Championships in London, United Kingdom:
    - Final: Jo-Wilfried Tsonga (FRA) vs. Andy Murray (GBR) — postponed to June 13 due to rain.
- WTA Tour:
  - Aegon Classic in Birmingham, United Kingdom:
    - Final: Sabine Lisicki (GER) vs. Daniela Hantuchová (SVK) — postponed to June 13 due to rain.
  - e-Boks Sony Ericsson Open in Farum, Denmark:
    - Final: **Caroline Wozniacki** (DEN) def. Lucie Šafářová (CZE) 6–1, 6–4
      - Wozniacki wins the title for the second successive time, for her fifth title of the year and the 17th title of her career.

==== Volleyball ====
- FIVB World League, Week 3 (team in **bold** advances to the final round):
  - Pool A: Brazil 1–3 United States
    - Standings (after 6 matches): Brazil 15 points, United States 12, **Poland** 9, Puerto Rico 0.
  - Pool B: Germany 2–3 Japan
    - Standings (after 6 matches): Russia 18 points, Bulgaria 9, Germany 6, Japan 3.
  - Pool D: South Korea 2–3 Italy
    - Standings (after 6 matches): Italy 16 points, South Korea 10, Cuba 9, France 1.
- Men's European League, Leg 3:
  - Pool A: Croatia 0–3 Belgium
    - Standings (after 6 matches): Slovenia 17 points, Belgium 8, Croatia 6, Great Britain 5.
  - Pool B:
    - Netherlands 3–0 Austria
    - Greece 0–3 Spain
      - Standings (after 6 matches): Spain 15 points, Netherlands 14, Greece 7, Austria 0.
  - Pool C: Belarus 3–1 Romania
    - Standings (after 6 matches): Romania, Slovakia 12 points, Belarus 7, Turkey 5.
- Women's European League, Leg 3:
  - Pool A:
    - Greece 1–3 Spain
    - Serbia 3–0 France
      - Standings (after 6 matches): Serbia 17 points, France 10, Spain 7, Greece 2.
  - Pool C: Belarus 0–3 Romania
    - Standings (after 6 matches): Turkey 18 points, Romania 11, Belarus 7, Croatia 0.

=== June 11, 2011 (Saturday) ===
==== Athletics ====
- Samsung Diamond League:
  - Adidas Grand Prix in New York City, United States:
    - Men:
      - 100m: Steve Mullings (JAM) 10.26
      - 400m: Jeremy Wariner (USA) 45.13
      - 400m hurdles: Javier Culson (PUR) 48.50
      - 800m: Alfred Kirwa Yego (KEN) 1:46.57
      - 1500m: David Torrence (USA) 3:36.15
      - 5000m: Dejen Gebremeskel (ETH) 13:05.22
      - Triple jump: Phillips Idowu (GBR) 16.67m
      - Pole vault: Romain Mesnil (FRA) 5.52m
    - Women:
      - 100m: Marshevet Myers (USA) 11.36
      - 100m hurdles: Danielle Carruthers (USA) 13.04
      - 200m: Allyson Felix (USA) 22.92
      - 400m: Kaliese Spencer (JAM) 50.98
      - 800m: Molly Beckwith (USA) 2:01.09
      - 1500m: Kenia Sinclair (JAM) 4:08.06
      - 3000m steeplechase: Milcah Chemos Cheywa (KEN) 9:27.29
      - Long jump: Funmi Jimoh (USA) 6.48m
      - High jump: Emma Green (SWE) 1.94m
      - Pole vault: Lacy Janson (USA) 4.27m
      - Discus throw: Stephanie Brown Trafton (USA) 62.94m
      - Javelin throw: Christina Obergföll (GER) 64.43m

==== Auto racing ====
- IndyCar Series:
  - Firestone Twin 275s in Fort Worth, Texas:
    - Race 1: (1) Dario Franchitti (GBR) (Chip Ganassi Racing) (2) Scott Dixon (NZL) (Chip Ganassi Racing) (3) Will Power (AUS) (Team Penske)
    - Race 2: (1) Power (2) Dixon (3) Ryan Briscoe (AUS) (Team Penske)
      - Drivers' championship standings (after 7 of 18 races): (1) Power 239 points (2) Franchitti 218 (3) Dixon 169

==== Basketball ====
- (France) Ligue Nationale de Basketball Playoffs Final in Paris: Cholet 74–76 **Nancy**
  - Nancy win the championship for the second time.

==== Cricket ====
- India in the West Indies:
  - 3rd ODI in North Sound, Antigua: West Indies 225/8 (50 overs); India 228/7 (46.2 overs). **India win by 3 wickets; lead 5-match series 3–0.**

==== Cycling ====
- UCI World Tour:
  - Critérium du Dauphiné, Stage 6: (gold) Joaquim Rodríguez (ESP) (Team Katusha) 5h 12' 47" (silver) Robert Gesink (NED) (Rabobank) + 31" (bronze) Jurgen Van den Broeck (BEL) (Omega Pharma–Lotto) + 39"
    - General classification (after stage 6): (1) Bradley Wiggins (GBR) (Team Sky) 23h 16' 11" (2) Cadel Evans (AUS) (BMC Racing Team) + 1' 26" (3) Alexander Vinokourov (KAZ) (Astana) + 1' 52"
  - Tour de Suisse, Stage 1: (gold) Fabian Cancellara (SUI) (Leopard Trek) 9' 41" (silver) Tejay van Garderen (USA) (HTC–Highroad) + 9" (bronze) Peter Sagan (SVK) (Liquigas–Cannondale) + 17"

==== Equestrianism ====
- Show jumping – Global Champions Tour:
  - 4th Competition in Cannes (CSI 5*): (gold) Edwina Alexander (AUS) on Itot du Château (silver) Sergio Alvarez Moya (ESP) on Action-Breaker (bronze) Ludger Beerbaum (GER) on Gotha FRH
    - Standings (after 4 of 10 competitions): (1) Beerbaum 128.5 points (2) Alexander 125 (3) Denis Lynch (IRL) 120

==== Football (soccer) ====
- CONCACAF Gold Cup in the United States (team in **bold** advances to the quarterfinals):
  - Group C in Tampa:
    - Canada 1–0 Guadeloupe
    - United States 1–2 **Panama**
      - Standings (after 2 matches): Panama 6 points, United States, Canada 3, Guadeloupe 0.
- UEFA European Under-21 Championship in Denmark:
  - Group A:
    - Belarus 2–0 Iceland in Aarhus
    - Denmark 0–1 Switzerland in Aalborg
- UEFA Women's U-19 Championship in Italy:
  - Final in Imola: Norway 1–8 **Germany**
    - Germany win the title for the sixth time.
- CAF Confederation Cup Play-off for group stage, second leg (first leg score in parentheses):
  - 1º de Agosto (Angola) 1–1 (0–4) (Ivory Coast) **ASEC Mimosas**. ASEC Mimosas win 5–1 on aggregate.
  - Difaa El Jadida (Morocco) 2–2 (0–3) (Angola) **Inter Luanda**. Inter Luanda win 5–2 on aggregate.
  - **Maghreb de Fès** (Morocco) 2–0 (0–1) (Zambia) ZESCO United. Maghreb de Fès win 2–1 on aggregate.

==== Horse racing ====
- U.S. Thoroughbred Triple Crown:
  - Belmont Stakes in Elmont, New York: (gold) Ruler on Ice (trainer: Kelly J. Breen; jockey: Jose Valdivia Jr.) (silver) Stay Thirsty (trainer: Todd Pletcher; jockey: Javier Castellano) (bronze) Brilliant Speed (trainer: Thomas Albertrani; jockey: Joel Rosario)

==== Mixed martial arts ====
- UFC 131 in Vancouver, British Columbia, Canada:
  - Heavyweight bout: **Junior dos Santos** (BRA) def. Shane Carwin (USA) via unanimous decision (30–27, 30–27, 30–26)
  - Featherweight bout: **Kenny Florian** (USA) def. Diego Nunes (BRA) via unanimous decision (29–28, 29–28, 30–27)
  - Heavyweight bout: **Dave Herman** (USA) def. Jon Olav Einemo (NOR) via TKO (punches)
  - Middleweight bout: **Mark Muñoz** (USA) def. Demian Maia (BRA) via unanimous decision (29–28, 29–28, 30–27)
  - Lightweight bout: **Donald Cerrone** (USA) def. Vagner Rocha (BRA) via unanimous decision (30–27, 30–27, 30–26)

==== Volleyball ====
- FIVB World League, Week 3 (team in **bold** advances to the final round):
  - Pool A:
    - Brazil 3–1 United States
    - Puerto Rico 0–3 **Poland**
      - Standings: Brazil 15 points (5 matches), United States 9 (5), Poland 9 (6), Puerto Rico 0 (6).
  - Pool B:
    - Russia 3–0 Bulgaria
    - Germany 3–2 Japan
      - Standings: Russia 18 points (6 matches), Bulgaria 9 (6), Germany 5 (5), Japan 1 (5).
  - Pool C:
    - Finland 0–3 Argentina
    - Serbia 3–0 Portugal
      - Standings (after 6 matches): Argentina 14 points, Serbia 10, Portugal 7, Finland 5.
  - Pool D:
    - South Korea 1–3 Italy
    - France 2–3 Cuba
      - Standings: Italy 14 points (5 matches), South Korea 9 (5), Cuba 9 (6), France 1 (6).
- Men's European League, Leg 3:
  - Pool A:
    - Great Britain 0–3 Slovenia
    - Croatia 2–3 Belgium
      - Standings: Slovenia 17 points (6 matches), Croatia 6 (5), Belgium 5 (5), Great Britain 5 (6).
  - Pool B:
    - Netherlands 3–0 Austria
    - Greece 1–3 Spain
      - Standings (after 5 matches): Spain 12 points, Netherlands 11, Greece 7, Austria 0.
  - Pool C:
    - Belarus 1–3 Romania
    - Turkey 0–3 Slovakia
      - Standings: Romania 12 points (5 matches), Slovakia 12 (6), Turkey 5 (6), Belarus 4 (5).
- Women's European League, Leg 3:
  - Pool A:
    - Greece 3–2 Spain
    - Serbia 3–2 France
      - Standings (after 5 matches): Serbia 14 points, France 10, Spain 4, Greece 2.
  - Pool B:
    - Czech Republic 2–3 Hungary
    - Bulgaria 3–0 Israel
      - Standings (after 6 matches): Bulgaria 14 points, Czech Republic 13, Hungary 5, Israel 4.
  - Pool C:
    - Belarus 2–3 Romania
    - Croatia 0–3 Turkey
      - Standings: Turkey 18 points (6 matches), Romania 8 (5), Belarus 7 (5), Croatia 0 (6).

=== June 10, 2011 (Friday) ===
==== Basketball ====
- (Czech Republic) National Basketball League Final, Game 6: BK Prostějov 65–82 ČEZ Nymburk. **ČEZ Nymburk win best-of-7 series 4–2**.
  - ČEZ Nymburk win the title for the eighth successive time.

==== Cycling ====
- UCI World Tour:
  - Critérium du Dauphiné, Stage 5: (gold) Christophe Kern (FRA) (Team Europcar) 5h 05' 03" (silver) Chris Anker Sørensen (DEN) (Saxo Bank–SunGard) + 7" (bronze) Thomas Voeckler (FRA) (Team Europcar) + 9"
    - General classification (after stage 5): (1) Bradley Wiggins (GBR) (Team Sky) 18h 02' 30" (2) Cadel Evans (AUS) (BMC Racing Team) + 1' 11" (3) Janez Brajkovič (SLO) (Team RadioShack) + 1' 21"

==== Football (soccer) ====
- CONCACAF Gold Cup in the United States (team in **bold** advances to the quarterfinals):
  - Group B in Miami:
    - **Jamaica** 2–0 Guatemala
    - Grenada 1–7 Honduras
      - Standings (after 2 matches): Jamaica 6 points, Honduras 4, Guatemala 1, Grenada 0.
- CAF Confederation Cup Play-off for group stage, second leg (first leg score in parentheses):
  - **JS Kabylie** (Algeria) 2–0 (1–1) (Senegal) Diaraf. Kabylie win 3–1 on aggregate.

==== Ice hockey ====
- Stanley Cup Finals (best-of-7 series):
  - Game 5 in Vancouver: Vancouver Canucks 1, Boston Bruins 0. Canucks lead series 3–2.

==== Rugby league ====
- International Origin Match in Leeds: England 12–16 Exiles

==== Rugby union ====
- IRB Junior World Championship in Italy:
  - Pool A:
    - Argentina 8–34 Wales in Padua
    - Italy 7–64 New Zealand in Treviso
  - Pool B in Rovigo:
    - Australia 54–7 Tonga
    - France 24–12 Fiji
  - Pool C:
    - England 33–25 Ireland in Treviso
    - South Africa 33–0 Scotland in Padua

==== Volleyball ====
- FIVB World League, Week 3 (team in **bold** advances to the final round):
  - Pool A: Puerto Rico 0–3 **Poland**
    - Standings: Brazil 12 points (4 matches), United States 9 (4), Poland 6 (5), Puerto Rico 0 (5).
  - Pool B: Russia 3–0 Bulgaria
    - Standings: Russia 15 points (5 matches), Bulgaria 9 (5), Germany 3 (4), Japan 0 (4).
  - Pool C:
    - Finland 2–3 Argentina
    - Serbia 2–3 Portugal
      - Standings (after 5 matches): Argentina 11 points, Portugal, Serbia 7, Finland 5.
- Men's European League, Leg 3:
  - Pool A: Great Britain 1–3 Slovenia
    - Standings: Slovenia 14 points (5 matches), Croatia 5 (4), Great Britain 5 (5), Belgium 3 (4).
  - Pool C: Turkey 3–2 Slovakia
    - Standings: Romania 9 points (4 matches), Slovakia 9 (5), Turkey 5 (5), Belarus 4 (4).
- Women's European League, Leg 3:
  - Pool B:
    - Czech Republic 3–0 Hungary
    - Bulgaria 3–2 Israel
      - Standings (after 5 matches): Czech Republic 12 points, Bulgaria 11, Israel 4, Hungary 3.
  - Pool C: Croatia 0–3 Turkey
    - Standings: Turkey 15 points (5 matches), Belarus, Romania 6 (4), Croatia 0 (5).

=== June 9, 2011 (Thursday) ===
==== Athletics ====
- Samsung Diamond League:
  - Bislett Games in Oslo, Norway:
    - Men:
      - 110m hurdles: Aries Merritt (USA) 13.12
      - 200m: Usain Bolt (JAM) 19.86
      - 800m Nordic: Johan Rogestedt (SWE) 1:48.60
      - 1500m: Nicholas Kemboi (KEN) 3:37.25
      - One mile: Asbel Kiprop (KEN) 3:50.86
      - 3000m steeplechase: Paul Kipsiele Koech (KEN) 8:01.83
      - Long jump: Godfrey Khotso Mokoena (RSA) 8.08m
      - High jump: Kyriakos Ioannou (CYP) 2.28m
      - Discus throw: Gerd Kanter (EST) 65.14m
      - Javelin throw: Matthias de Zordo (GER) 83.94m
    - Women:
      - 100m: Ivet Lalova (BUL) 11.01
      - 100m hurdles: Christina Vukicevic (NOR) 12.79
      - 400m: Amantle Montsho (BOT) 50.10
      - 400m hurdles: Zuzana Hejnová (CZE) 54.38
      - 800m: Halima Hachlaf (MAR) 1:58.27
      - 1500m: Viktoria Tegenfeldt (SWE) 4:16.99
      - 5000m: Meseret Defar (ETH) 14:37.32
      - Triple jump: Yargelis Savigne (CUB) 14.81m
      - Pole vault: Fabiana Murer (BRA) 4.60m
      - Shot put: Valerie Adams (NZL) 20.26m

==== Baseball ====
- Major League Baseball news: The Oakland Athletics, currently in last place in the American League West and in the midst of a 9-game losing streak, fire manager Bob Geren, becoming the first team to do so this season. Former Arizona Diamondbacks and Seattle Mariners manager Bob Melvin is named as Geren's interim replacement.

==== Basketball ====
- (United States) NBA Finals (best-of-7 series):
  - Game 5 in Dallas: Dallas Mavericks 112, Miami Heat 103. Mavericks lead series 3–2.

==== Cycling ====
- UCI World Tour:
  - Critérium du Dauphiné, Stage 4: (gold) John Degenkolb (GER) (HTC–Highroad) 4h 15' 41" (silver) Edvald Boasson Hagen (NOR) (Team Sky) s.t. (bronze) Juan José Haedo (ARG) (Saxo Bank–SunGard) s.t.
    - General classification (after stage 4): (1) Bradley Wiggins (GBR) (Team Sky) 12h 57' 18" (2) Cadel Evans (AUS) (BMC Racing Team) + 1' 11" (3) Janez Brajkovič (SLO) (Team RadioShack) + 1' 21"

==== Football (soccer) ====
- CONCACAF Gold Cup in the United States (team in **bold** advances to the quarterfinals):
  - Group A in Charlotte:
    - Costa Rica 1–1 El Salvador
    - Cuba 0–5 **Mexico**
      - Standings (after 2 matches): Mexico 6 points, Costa Rica 4, El Salvador 1, Cuba 0.
- Chilean Primera División Campeonato Apertura Final, first leg: Universidad de Chile 0–2 Universidad Católica

==== Volleyball ====
- FIVB World League, Week 3:
  - Pool D: France 1–3 Cuba
    - Standings: Italy 11 points (4 matches), South Korea 9 (4), Cuba 7 (5), France 0 (5).

=== June 8, 2011 (Wednesday) ===
==== Basketball ====
- League of Serbia Final, Game 3: Partizan 86–69 Hemofarm. **Partizan win best-of-5 series 3–0.**
  - Partizan win the title for the tenth successive time and 18th time overall.

==== Cricket ====
- India in the West Indies:
  - 2nd ODI in Port of Spain, Trinidad: West Indies 240/9 (50 overs); India 183/3 (33.4/37 overs). **India win by 7 wickets (D/L); lead 5-match series 2–0.**

==== Cycling ====
- UCI World Tour:
  - Critérium du Dauphiné, Stage 3: (gold) Tony Martin (GER) (HTC–Highroad) 55' 27" (silver) Bradley Wiggins (GBR) (Team Sky) + 11" (bronze) Edvald Boasson Hagen (NOR) (Team Sky) + 43"
    - General classification (after stage 3): (1) Wiggins 8h 41' 37" (2) Cadel Evans (AUS) (BMC Racing Team) + 1' 11" (3) Janez Brajkovič (SLO) (Team RadioShack) + 1' 21"

==== Football (soccer) ====
- Friendly international (top 10 in FIFA World Rankings):
  - (7) Uruguay 1–1 (2) Netherlands
- UEFA Women's U-19 Championship in Italy:
  - Semifinals:
    - Italy 2–3 **Norway** in Bellaria
    - **Germany** 3–1 Switzerland in Imola
- (Brazil) Copa do Brasil Finals, second leg (first leg score in parentheses):
  - Coritiba 3–2 (0–1) **Vasco da Gama**. 3–3 on points, 3–3 on aggregate; Vasco da Gama win on away goals.
    - Vasco win the Cup for the first time.

==== Ice hockey ====
- Stanley Cup Finals (best-of-7 series):
  - Game 4 in Boston: Boston Bruins 4, Vancouver Canucks 0. Series tied 2–2.

=== June 7, 2011 (Tuesday) ===
==== Basketball ====
- (United States) NBA Finals (best-of-7 series):
  - Game 4 in Dallas: Dallas Mavericks 86, Miami Heat 83. Series tied 2–2.

==== Cricket ====
- Sri Lanka in England:
  - 2nd Test in London, day 5: England 486 & 335/7d (78.1 overs; Alastair Cook 106); Sri Lanka 479 & 127/3 (43 overs). **Match drawn; England lead 3-match series 1–0.**

==== Cycling ====
- UCI World Tour:
  - Critérium du Dauphiné, Stage 2: (gold) John Degenkolb (GER) (HTC–Highroad) 4h 02' 39" (silver) Samuel Dumoulin (FRA) (Cofidis) s.t. (bronze) Sébastien Hinault (FRA) (Ag2r–La Mondiale) s.t.
    - General classification (after stage 2): (1) Alexander Vinokourov (KAZ) (Astana) 7h 45' 48" (2) Jurgen Van den Broeck (BEL) (Omega Pharma–Lotto) + 11" (3) Bradley Wiggins (GBR) (Team Sky) + 11"

==== Football (soccer) ====
- CONCACAF Gold Cup in the United States:
  - Group C in Detroit:
    - Panama 3–2 Guadeloupe
    - United States 2–0 Canada
- UEFA Euro 2012 qualifying, matchday 8:
  - Group A: Azerbaijan 1–3 Germany
    - Standings: Germany 21 points (7 matches), Belgium 11 (7), Turkey 10 (6), Austria 7 (6), Kazakhstan, Azerbaijan 3 (6).
  - Group C: Faroe Islands 2–0 Estonia
    - Standings: Italy 16 points (6 matches), Slovenia 11 (7), Serbia 8 (6), Estonia 7 (7), Northern Ireland 6 (5), Faroe Islands 4 (7).
  - Group D:
    - Belarus 2–0 Luxembourg
    - Bosnia and Herzegovina 2–0 Albania
      - Standings: France 13 points (6 matches), Belarus 12 (7), Bosnia and Herzegovina 10 (6), Romania, Albania 8 (6), Luxembourg 1 (7).
  - Group E:
    - Sweden 5–0 Finland
    - San Marino 0–3 Hungary
      - Standings: Netherlands 18 points (6 matches), Sweden 15 (6), Hungary 12 (7), Moldova, Finland 6 (6), San Marino 0 (7).
- Friendly internationals (top 10 in FIFA World Rankings):
  - Venezuela 0–3 (1) Spain
  - (3) Brazil 1–0 Romania
  - (9) Italy 0–2 Republic of Ireland in Liège, Belgium
- Friendly women's internationals (top 10 in FIFA Women's World Rankings):
  - (2) Germany 5–0 Netherlands
  - Hungary 0–1 (6) Canada

=== June 6, 2011 (Monday) ===
==== Cricket ====
- Sri Lanka in England:
  - 2nd Test in London, day 4: England 486 & 149/2 (41 overs); Sri Lanka 479 (131.4 overs). England lead by 156 runs with 8 wickets remaining.
- India in the West Indies:
  - 1st ODI in Port of Spain, Trinidad: West Indies 214/9 (50 overs); India 217/6 (44.5 overs). **India win by 4 wickets; lead 5-match series 1–0.**

==== Cycling ====
- UCI World Tour:
  - Critérium du Dauphiné, Stage 1: (gold) Jurgen Van den Broeck (BEL) (Omega Pharma–Lotto) 3h 36' 42" (silver) Joaquim Rodríguez (ESP) (Team Katusha) + 6" (bronze) Cadel Evans (AUS) (BMC Racing Team) + 7"
    - General classification (after stage 1): (1) Alexander Vinokourov (KAZ) (Astana) 3h 43' 09" (2) Van Den Broeck + 5" (3) Evans + 7"

==== Football (soccer) ====
- CONCACAF Gold Cup in the United States:
  - Group B in Carson:
    - Jamaica 4–0 Grenada
    - Honduras 0–0 Guatemala

==== Ice hockey ====
- Stanley Cup Finals (best-of-7 series):
  - Game 3 in Boston: Boston Bruins 8, Vancouver Canucks 1. Canucks lead series 2–1.

=== June 5, 2011 (Sunday) ===
==== Auto racing ====
- Sprint Cup Series:
  - STP 400 in Kansas City, Kansas: (1) (Michigan) Brad Keselowski (Dodge; Penske Racing) (2) (North Carolina) Dale Earnhardt Jr. (Chevrolet; Hendrick Motorsports) (3) (Virginia) Denny Hamlin (Toyota; Joe Gibbs Racing)
    - Drivers' championship standings (after 13 of 36 races): (1) (Missouri) Carl Edwards (Ford; Roush Fenway Racing) 485 points (2) (California) Jimmie Johnson (Chevrolet; Hendrick Motorsports) 445 (3) Earnhardt Jr. 444
- World Touring Car Championship:
  - Race of Hungary in Budapest:
    - Race 1: (1) Alain Menu (SUI) (Chevrolet; Chevrolet Cruze) (2) Norbert Michelisz (HUN) (Zengõ-Dension Team, BMW 320 TC) (3) Javier Villa (ESP) (Proteam Racing, BMW 320 TC)
    - Race 2: (1) Yvan Muller (FRA) (Chevrolet; Chevrolet Cruze) (2) Rob Huff (GBR) (Chevrolet; Chevrolet Cruze) (3) Gabriele Tarquini (ITA) (Lukoil – SUNRED, SEAT León)
      - Drivers' championship standings (after 4 of 12 rounds): (1) Huff 150 points (2) Muller 119 (3) Menu 104

==== Basketball ====
- FIBA Asia Champions Cup in Pasig, Philippines:
  - 7th place game: **Al-Ittihad Jeddah** (Saudi Arabia) 104–95 (Iraq) Duhok Sports Club
  - 5th place game: Al-Jalaa Aleppo (Syria) 65–72 (Jordan) **ASU Sports**
  - 3rd place game: Smart Gilas (Philippines) 64–71 (bronze) (Qatar) **Al-Rayyan**
  - Finals game: (silver) Mahram Tehran (Iran) 82–91 (gold) (Lebanon) **Al-Riyadi Beirut**
    - Al-Riyadi Beirut win the title for the first time.
- (United States) NBA Finals (best-of-7 series):
  - Game 3 in Dallas: Miami Heat 88, Dallas Mavericks 86. Heat lead series 2–1.
- (Greece) HEBA A1 Playoffs Final, Game 4: Panathinaikos 101–94 (OT) Olympiacos. **Panathinaikos win best-of-5 series 3–1**.
  - Panathinaikos win the title for the ninth successive time and 32nd time overall.

==== Cricket ====
- Sri Lanka in England:
  - 2nd Test in London, day 3: England 486; Sri Lanka 372/3 (102.2 overs; Tillakaratne Dilshan 193). Sri Lanka trail by 114 runs with 7 wickets remaining in the 1st innings.

==== Cycling ====
- UCI World Tour:
  - Critérium du Dauphiné, Prologue: (gold) Lars Boom (NED) (Rabobank) 6' 18" (silver) Alexander Vinokourov (KAZ) (Astana) + 2" (bronze) Bradley Wiggins (GBR) (Team Sky) + 5"

==== Equestrianism ====
- Show jumping – CSIO Schweiz in St. Gallen (CSIO 5*):
  - Grand Prix: (gold) Nick Skelton (GBR) on Carlo (silver) Rich Fellers (USA) on Flexible (bronze) Christine McCrea (USA) on Take One
- Show jumping – Deutsches Spring-Derby in Hamburg: (gold) Andre Thieme (GER) on Nacorde (silver) Torben Köhlbrandt (GER) on C-Trenton Z (bronze) Marcel Ewen (LUX) on Orgueil Fontaine

==== Football (soccer) ====
- CONCACAF Gold Cup in the United States:
  - Group A in Arlington:
    - Costa Rica 5–0 Cuba
    - Mexico 5–0 El Salvador
- Africa Cup of Nations qualification, matchday 4: (teams in **bold** qualify for the Finals)
  - Group A:
    - Zimbabwe 2–1 Mali
    - Liberia 1–0 Cape Verde
      - Standings (after 4 matches): Cape Verde 7 points, Mali 6, Zimbabwe 5, Liberia 4.
  - Group B:
    - Ethiopia 2–2 Nigeria
    - Guinea 4–1 Madagascar
      - Standings (after 4 matches): Guinea 10 points, Nigeria 7, Ethiopia 4, Madagascar 1.
  - Group C: Comoros 1–1 Libya
    - Standings (after 4 matches): Zambia 9 points, Libya 8, Mozambique 4, Comoros 1.
  - Group D: Central African Republic 2–1 Tanzania
    - Standings (after 4 matches): Morocco, Central African Republic 7 points, Tanzania, Algeria 4.
  - Group E: Mauritius 1–2 Congo DR
    - Standings (after 4 matches): Senegal 10 points, Congo DR 7, Cameroon 5, Mauritius 0.
  - Group G: Egypt 0–0 South Africa
    - Standings (after 4 matches): South Africa 8 points, Niger 6, Sierra Leone 5, Egypt 2.
  - Group H:
    - Burundi 3–1 Rwanda
    - Benin 2–6 **Ivory Coast**
      - Standings (after 4 matches): Côte d'Ivoire 12 points, Burundi, Benin 4, Rwanda 3.
  - Group I: Swaziland 1–2 Sudan
    - Standings (after 4 matches): Ghana, Sudan 10 points, Congo 3, Swaziland 0.
  - Group J: Angola 1–0 Kenya
    - Standings (after 4 matches): Uganda 10 points, Angola 6, Kenya 4, Guinea-Bissau 3.
  - Group K:
    - **Botswana** 0–0 Malawi
    - Tunisia 5–0 Chad
      - Standings: Botswana 17 points (7 matches), Tunisia, Malawi 10 (6), Togo 3 (6), Chad 2 (7).
- Friendly international (top 10 in FIFA World Rankings):
  - Poland 2–1 (5) Argentina
- Friendly women's international (top 10 in FIFA Women's World Rankings):
  - (1) United States 1–0 Mexico
- UEFA Women's U-19 Championship in Italy: (teams in **bold** advance to the semifinals)
  - Group A:
    - Belgium 1–3 **Italy** in Bellaria
    - Russia 0–0 **Switzerland** in Cervia
      - Final standings: Italy 9 points, Switzerland, Russia 4, Belgium 0.
  - Group B:
    - Netherlands 1–2 **Germany** in Imola
    - **Norway** 5–1 Spain in Forlì
      - Final standings: Germany 9 points, Norway 6, Netherlands, Spain 1.

==== Golf ====
- PGA Tour:
  - Memorial Tournament in Dublin, Ohio:
    - Winner: Steve Stricker (USA) 272 (−16)
      - Stricker wins his tenth PGA Tour title.
- European Tour:
  - Saab Wales Open in Newport, Wales:
    - Winner: Alex Norén (SWE) 275 (−9)
      - Norén wins his second European Tour title.
- LPGA Tour:
  - ShopRite LPGA Classic in Galloway, New Jersey:
    - Winner: Brittany Lincicome (USA) 202 (−11)
      - Lincicome wins her fourth LPGA Tour title.
- Champions Tour:
  - Principal Charity Classic in West Des Moines, Iowa:
    - Winner: Bob Gilder (USA) 199 (−14)
      - Gilder wins his tenth Champions Tour title, and first since 2006.

==== Motorcycle racing ====
- Moto GP:
  - Catalan Grand Prix in Montmeló, Spain:
    - MotoGP: (1) Casey Stoner (AUS) (Honda) (2) Jorge Lorenzo (ESP) (Yamaha) (3) Ben Spies (USA) (Yamaha)
      - Riders' championship standings (after 5 of 18 races): (1) Lorenzo 98 points (2) Stoner 91 (3) Andrea Dovizioso (ITA) (Honda) 63
    - Moto2: (1) Stefan Bradl (GER) (Kalex) (2) Marc Márquez (ESP) (Suter) (3) Aleix Espargaró (ESP) (Pons Kalex)
      - Riders' championship standings (after 5 of 17 races): (1) Bradl 102 points (2) Simone Corsi (ITA) (FTR) 59 (3) Andrea Iannone (ITA) (Suter) & Julián Simón (ESP) (Suter) 49
    - 125cc: (1) Nicolás Terol (ESP) (Aprilia) 120 points (2) Maverick Viñales (ESP) (Aprilia) (3) Jonas Folger (GER) (Aprilia)
      - Riders' championship standings (after 5 of 17 races): (1) Terol 120 points (2) Sandro Cortese (GER) (Aprilia) 72 (3) Folger 68

==== Rugby union ====
- IRB Junior World Trophy in Georgia:
  - 7th place game: **United States** 30–29 Zimbabwe
  - 5th place game: Russia 24–49 **Canada**
  - 3rd place game: Uruguay 15–20 (bronze) **Georgia**
  - Final: (gold) **Samoa** 31–24 (silver) Japan
    - Samoa qualify for the 2012 IRB Junior World Championship.

==== Tennis ====
- French Open in Paris, France, day 15:
  - Men's singles – Final: **Rafael Nadal** [1] (ESP) def. Roger Federer (SUI) [3] 7–5, 7–6(3), 5–7, 6–1
    - Nadal wins the French Open for the sixth time and equals the record of Björn Borg (SWE), and his tenth Grand Slam title.
  - Boys' singles – Final: **Bjorn Fratangelo** (USA) def. Dominic Thiem (AUS) [14] 3–6, 6–3, 8–6
    - Fratangelo wins his first junior Grand Slam title.
  - Girls' singles – Final: **Ons Jabeur** (TUN) [9] def. Monica Puig (PUR) [5] 7–6(8), 6–1
    - Jabeur wins her first junior Grand Slam title, and becomes the first Tunisian player to win any Grand Slam title.
  - Legends Under 45 Doubles Final: **Fabrice Santoro** (FRA)/**Todd Woodbridge** (AUS) def. Arnaud Boetsch (FRA)/Cédric Pioline (FRA) 6–2, 6–4
  - Legends Over 45 Doubles Final: **Guy Forget** (FRA)/**Henri Leconte** (FRA) def. Andrés Gómez (ECU)/John McEnroe (USA) 6–3, 5–7, [10–8]
  - Women's Legends Doubles Final: **Lindsay Davenport** (USA)/**Martina Hingis** (SUI) def. Martina Navratilova (USA)/Jana Novotná (CZE) 6–1, 6–2

==== Triathlon ====
- ITU World Championships, Leg 2 in Madrid, Spain:
  - Women: (gold) Paula Findlay (CAN) 2:03:46 (silver) Helen Jenkins (GBR) 2:03:49 (bronze) Emmie Charayron (FRA) 2:03:58
    - Standings (after 2 of 6 legs): (1) Findlay 1600 points (2) Barbara Riveros Diaz (CHI) 1326 (3) Andrea Hewitt (NZL) 1318

==== Volleyball ====
- FIVB World League, Week 2 (team in **bold** advances to the final round):
  - Pool A: Brazil 3–1 **Poland**
    - Standings (after 4 matches): Brazil 12 points, United States 9, Poland 3, Puerto Rico 0.
  - Pool B: Bulgaria 3–0 Japan
    - Standings (after 4 matches): Russia 12 points, Bulgaria 9, Germany 3, Japan 0.
  - Pool D:
    - South Korea 3–1 France
    - Italy 3–2 Cuba
      - Standings (after 4 matches): Italy 11 points, South Korea 9, Cuba 4, France 0.
- Men's European League, Leg 2:
  - Pool A:
    - Belgium 3–1 Great Britain
    - Slovenia 3–2 Croatia
      - Standings (after 4 matches): Slovenia 11 points, Great Britain, Croatia 5, Belgium 3.
  - Pool B: Netherlands 3–0 Greece
    - Standings (after 4 matches): Spain 9 points, Netherlands 8, Greece 7, Austria 0.
  - Pool C:
    - Turkey 1–3 Romania
    - Slovakia 3–1 Belarus
      - Standings (after 4 matches): Romania 9 points, Slovakia 8, Belarus 4, Turkey 3.
- Women's European League, Leg 2:
  - Pool C:
    - Belarus 3–0 Croatia
    - Turkey 3–0 Romania
      - Standings (after 4 matches): Turkey 12 points, Belarus, Romania 6, Croatia 0.

=== June 4, 2011 (Saturday) ===
==== Athletics ====
- Samsung Diamond League:
  - Prefontaine Classic in Eugene, United States:
    - Men:
      - 100m: Steve Mullings (JAM) 9.80
      - 110m hurdles: David Oliver (USA) 12.94
      - 200m: Walter Dix (USA) 20.19
      - 400m: Angelo Taylor (USA) 45.16
      - 800m: Abubaker Kaki Khamis (SUD) 1:43.68
      - Bowerman mile: Haron Keitany (KEN) 3:49.09
      - International mile: Ryan Gregson (AUS) 3:53.86
      - 3000m steeplechase: Ezekiel Kemboi (KEN) 8:08.34
      - 2 miles: Bernard Lagat (USA) 8:13.62
      - High jump: Raúl Spank (GER) 2.32m
      - Long jump: Greg Rutherford (GBR) 8.32m
      - Shot put: Reese Hoffa (USA) 21.65m
      - Discus throw: Robert Harting (GER) 68.40m
    - Women:
      - 100m: Carmelita Jeter (USA) 10.70
      - 400m: Amantle Montsho (BOT) 50.59
      - 400m hurdles: Lashinda Demus (USA) 53.31
      - 800m: Kenia Sinclair (JAM) 1:58.29
      - 1500m: Gelete Burka (ETH) 4:04.63
      - Triple jump: Olha Saladukha (UKR) 14.98m
      - Pole vault: Anna Rogowska (POL) 4.68m
      - Shot put: Nadzeya Astapchuk (BLR) 20.59m
      - Javelin throw: Christina Obergföll (GER) 65.48m

==== Auto racing ====
- Nationwide Series:
  - STP 300 in Joliet, Illinois: (1) Justin Allgaier (Chevrolet; Turner Motorsports) (2) (Missouri) Carl Edwards (Ford; Roush Fenway Racing) (3) (Tennessee) Trevor Bayne (Ford; Roush Fenway Racing)
    - Drivers' championship standings (after 14 of 34 races): (1) (Georgia (U.S. state)) Reed Sorenson (Chevrolet; Turner Motorsports) 488 points (2) (Virginia) Elliott Sadler (Chevrolet; Kevin Harvick Incorporated) 486 (3) (Mississippi) Ricky Stenhouse Jr. (Ford; Roush Fenway Racing) 482

==== Basketball ====
- FIBA Asia Champions Cup in Pasig, Philippines:
  - 5th to 8th classification:
    - Al-Ittihad Jeddah (Saudi Arabia) 77–85 (Syria) **Al-Jalaa Aleppo**
    - Duhok Sports Club (Iraq) 90–98 (Jordan) **ASU Sports**
  - Semi-finals:
    - **Mahram Tehran** (Iran) 80–77 (Philippines) Smart Gilas
    - **Al-Riyadi Beirut** (Lebanon) 71–52 (Qatar) Al-Rayyan

==== Cricket ====
- Sri Lanka in England:
  - 2nd Test in London, day 2: England 486 (112.5 overs; Matt Prior 126); Sri Lanka 231/1 (63 overs; Tillakaratne Dilshan 127*). Sri Lanka trail by 255 runs with 9 wickets remaining in the 1st innings.
- India in the West Indies:
  - Only T20I in Port of Spain, Trinidad: India 159/6 (20 overs); West Indies 143/5 (20 overs). **India win by 16 runs**.

==== Equestrianism ====
- Show jumping – Global Champions Tour:
  - 3rd Competition in Hamburg (CSI 5*): (gold) Rolf-Göran Bengtsson (SWE) on Casall (silver) Ludger Beerbaum (GER) on Chaman (bronze) Janne Friederike Meyer (GER) on Lambrasco
    - Standings (after 3 of 10 competitions): (1) Álvaro de Miranda Neto (BRA) 98 points (2) Beerbaum 93.5 (3) Denis Lynch (IRL) 88
- Show jumping – CSIO Schweiz in St. Gallen (CSIO 5*):
  - Grosses Jagdspringen: (gold) Ben Maher (GBR) on Oscar IX (silver) Rich Fellers (USA) on Mc Guinness (bronze) Janika Sprunger (SUI) on Komparse

==== Football (soccer) ====
- UEFA Euro 2012 qualifying, matchday 7:
  - Group B:
    - Russia 3–1 Armenia
    - Slovakia 1–0 Andorra
    - North Macedonia 0–2 Republic of Ireland
      - Standings (after 6 matches): Slovakia, Russia, Republic of Ireland 13 points, Armenia 8, Macedonia 4, Andorra 0.
  - Group F:
    - Latvia 1–2 Israel
    - Greece 3–1 Malta
      - Standings: Greece 14 points (6 matches), Croatia 13 (6), Israel 13 (7), Georgia 9 (7), Latvia 4 (6), Malta 0 (6).
  - Group G:
    - England 2–2 Switzerland
    - Montenegro 1–1 Bulgaria
      - Standings: England, Montenegro 11 points (5 matches), Switzerland, Bulgaria 5 (5), Wales 0 (4).
  - Group H:
    - Iceland 0–2 Denmark
    - Portugal 1–0 Norway
      - Standings: Portugal, Norway, Denmark 10 points (5 matches), Cyprus 2 (4), Iceland 1 (5).
- Africa Cup of Nations qualification, matchday 4:
  - Group C: Zambia 3–0 Mozambique
    - Standings: Zambia 9 points (4 matches), Libya 7 (3), Mozambique 4 (4), Comoros 0 (3).
  - Group D: Morocco 4–0 Algeria
    - Standings: Morocco 7 points (4 matches), Central African Republic, Tanzania 4 (3), Algeria 4 (4).
  - Group E: Cameroon 0–0 Senegal
    - Standings: Senegal 10 points (4 matches), Cameroon 5 (4), Congo DR 4 (3), Mauritius 0 (3).
  - Group F: Namibia 1–4 Burkina Faso
    - Standings: Burkina Faso 9 points (3 matches), Gambia 3 (2), Namibia 0 (3).
  - Group G: Sierra Leone 1–0 Niger
    - Standings: South Africa 7 points (3 matches), Niger 6 (4), Sierra Leone 5 (4), Egypt 1 (3).
  - Group J: Uganda 2–0 Guinea-Bissau
    - Standings: Uganda 10 points (4 matches), Kenya 4 (3), Angola 3 (3), Guinea-Bissau 3 (4).
- Friendly international: (top 10 in FIFA World Rankings)
  - United States 0–4 (1) Spain
  - (3) Brazil 0–0 (2) Netherlands

==== Horse racing ====
- English Thoroughbred Triple Crown:
  - Epsom Derby in Epsom: (gold) Pour Moi (trainer: André Fabre; jockey: Mickael Barzalona) (silver) Treasure Beach (trainer: Aidan O'Brien; jockey: Colm O'Donoghue) (bronze) Carlton House (trainer: Michael Stoute; jockey: Ryan L. Moore)

==== Ice hockey ====
- Stanley Cup Finals (best-of-7 series):
  - Game 2 in Vancouver: Vancouver Canucks 3, Boston Bruins 2 (OT). Canucks lead series 2–0.

==== Mixed martial arts ====
- The Ultimate Fighter 13 Finale in Las Vegas, United States:
  - Welterweight bout: **Chris Cope** (USA) def. Chuck O'Neil (USA) via unanimous decision
  - Light Heavyweight bout: **Kyle Kingsbury** (USA) def. Fabio Maldonado (BRA) via unanimous decision
  - Middleweight bout: **Ed Herman** (USA) def. Tim Credeur (USA) via TKO (punches)
  - Lightweight bout: **Clay Guida** (USA) def. Anthony Pettis (USA) via unanimous decision
  - Welterweight bout: **Tony Ferguson** (USA) def. Ramsey Nijem (USA) via KO (punches)

==== Rugby union ====
- (France) Top 14 Final in Saint-Denis: **Toulouse** 15–10 Montpellier
  - Toulouse lift the Bouclier de Brennus for the 18th time.

==== Tennis ====
- French Open in Paris, France, day 14:
  - Women's singles – Final: **Li Na** (CHN) [6] def. Francesca Schiavone [5] (ITA) 6–4, 7–6(0)
    - Li becomes the first player from Asia to win a Grand Slam singles title.
  - Men's doubles – Final: **Max Mirnyi** (BLR)/**Daniel Nestor** (CAN) [2] def. Juan Sebastián Cabal (COL)/Eduardo Schwank(ARG) 7–6(3), 3–6, 6–4
    - Mirnyi and Nestor both win their third French Open men's doubles title; Mirnyi wins his fifth Grand Slam men's doubles title, and Nestor his seventh.
  - Boys' doubles – Final: **Andrés Artunedo** (ESP)/**Roberto Carballés** (ESP) [4] def. Mitchell Krueger (USA)/Shane Vinsant (USA) 5–7, 7–6(5), [10–5]
    - Artunedo and Carballes both win their first junior Grand Slam title.
  - Girls' doubles – Final: **Irina Khromacheva** (RUS)/**Maryna Zanevska** (UKR) [2] def. Victoria Kan (RUS)/Demi Schuurs (NED) 6–4, 7–5
    - Khromacheva wins her first junior Grand Slam doubles title, and Zanevska wins her second.

==== Triathlon ====
- ITU World Championships, Leg 2 in Madrid, Spain:
  - Men: (gold) Alistair Brownlee (GBR) 1:51:06 (silver) Jonathan Brownlee (GBR) 1:51:09 (bronze) Javier Gómez (ESP) 1:51:51
    - Standings (after 2 of 6 legs): (1) Gómez 1485 points (2) Jonathan Brownlee 1480 (3) Dmitry Polyanski (RUS) 983

==== Volleyball ====
- FIVB World League, Week 2 (team in **bold** advances to the final round):
  - Pool A:
    - Brazil 3–0 **Poland**
    - Puerto Rico 1–3 United States
      - Standings: Brazil 9 points (3 matches), United States 9 (4), Poland 3 (3), Puerto Rico 0 (4).
  - Pool B:
    - Russia 3–0 Germany
    - Bulgaria 3–1 Japan
      - Standings: Russia 12 points (4 matches), Bulgaria 6 (3), Germany 3 (4), Japan 0 (3).
  - Pool C:
    - Serbia 3–0 Finland
    - Portugal 1–3 Argentina
      - Standings (after 4 matches): Argentina 9 points, Serbia 6, Portugal 5, Finland 4.
  - Pool D: South Korea 3–1 France
    - Standings (after 3 matches): Italy 9 points, South Korea 6, Cuba 3, France 0.
- Men's European League, Leg 2:
  - Pool A:
    - Slovenia 3–0 Croatia
    - Belgium 0–3 Great Britain
      - Standings (after 3 matches): Slovenia 9 points, Great Britain 5, Croatia 4, Belgium 0.
  - Pool B:
    - Spain 3–1 Austria
    - Netherlands 3–2 Greece
      - Standings: Spain 9 points (4 matches), Greece 7 (3), Netherlands 5 (3), Austria 0 (4).
  - Pool C:
    - Turkey 0–3 Romania
    - Slovakia 3–2 Belarus
      - Standings (after 3 matches): Romania 6 points, Slovakia 5, Belarus 4, Turkey 3.
- Women's European League, Leg 2:
  - Pool A:
    - Spain 0–3 Serbia
    - France 3–0 Greece
      - Standings (after 4 matches): Serbia 12 points, France 9, Spain 3, Greece 0.
  - Pool B:
    - Hungary 0–3 Bulgaria
    - Israel 0–3 Czech Republic
      - Standings (after 4 matches): Czech Republic, Bulgaria 9 points, Hungary, Israel 3.
  - Pool C:
    - Belarus 3–0 Croatia
    - Turkey 3–0 Romania
      - Standings (after 3 matches): Turkey 9 points, Romania 6, Belarus 3, Croatia 0.

=== June 3, 2011 (Friday) ===
==== Athletics ====
- Samsung Diamond League:
  - Prefontaine Classic in Eugene, United States:
    - Men:
      - 10000m: Mo Farah (GBR) 26:46.57
      - 25000m: Moses Mosop (KEN) 1:12:25.4 (WR)
      - 30000m: Mosop 1:26:47.4 (WR)
    - Women's 5000m: Vivian Cheruiyot (KEN) 14:33.96

==== Basketball ====
- FIBA Asia Champions Cup in Pasig, Philippines:
  - Quarter-finals:
    - **Al-Riyadi Beirut** (Lebanon) 106–80 (Iraq) Duhok Sports Club
    - **Mahram Tehran** (Iran) 102–65 (Saudi Arabia) Al-Ittihad Jeddah
    - **Smart Gilas** (Philippines) 85–80 (Syria) Al-Jalaa Aleppo
    - ASU Sports (Jordan) 77–83 (Qatar) **Al-Rayyan**

==== Cricket ====
- Sri Lanka in England:
  - 2nd Test in London, day 1: England 342/6 (88 overs); Sri Lanka.

==== Equestrianism ====
- FEI Nations Cup Show Jumping:
  - Nations Cup of Switzerland in St. Gallen (CSIO 5*): (gold) Netherlands (Eric van der Vleuten, Piet Raijmakers jr., Maikel van der Vleuten, Jur Vrieling) (silver) Great Britain (Tim Stockdale, Robert Smith, Scott Brash, Nick Skelton) & Switzerland (Steve Guerdat, Werner Muff, Janika Sprunger, Pius Schwizer)
    - Standings (after 3 of 8 events): (1) Netherlands 23.5 points (2) Ireland 19 (3) Belgium 18

==== Football (soccer) ====
- UEFA Euro 2012 qualifying, matchday 7:
  - Group A:
    - Kazakhstan 2–1 Azerbaijan
    - Austria 1–2 Germany
    - Belgium 1–1 Turkey
      - Standings: Germany 18 points (6 matches), Belgium 11 (7), Turkey 10 (6), Austria 7 (6), Azerbaijan 3 (5), Kazakhstan 3 (6).
  - Group C:
    - Faroe Islands 0–2 Slovenia
    - Italy 3–0 Estonia
      - Standings: Italy 16 points (6 matches), Slovenia 11 (7), Serbia 8 (6), Estonia 7 (6), Northern Ireland 6 (5), Faroe Islands 1 (6).
  - Group D:
    - Romania 3–0 Bosnia and Herzegovina
    - Belarus 1–1 France
      - Standings: France 13 points (6 matches), Belarus 9 (6), Albania 8 (5), Romania 8 (6), Bosnia and Herzegovina 7 (5), Luxembourg 1 (6).
  - Group E:
    - San Marino 0–1 Finland
    - Moldova 1–4 Sweden
      - Standings: Netherlands 18 points (6 matches), Sweden 12 (5), Hungary 9 (6), Moldova 6 (6), Finland 6 (5), San Marino 0 (6).
  - Group F: Croatia 2–1 Georgia
    - Standings: Croatia 13 points (6 matches), Greece 11 (5), Israel 10 (6), Georgia 9 (7), Latvia 4 (5), Malta 0 (5).
  - Group I: Liechtenstein 2–0 Lithuania
    - Standings: Spain 15 points (5 matches), Czech Republic 9 (5), Scotland 4 (4), Lithuania 4 (5), Liechtenstein 3 (5).
- Africa Cup of Nations qualification, matchday 4:
  - Group I: Ghana 3–1 Congo
    - Standings: Ghana 10 points (4 matches), Sudan 7 (3), Congo 3 (4), Swaziland 0 (3).
- Friendly women's international (top 10 in FIFA Women's World Rankings):
  - (2) Germany 5–0 Italy

==== Tennis ====
- French Open in Paris, France, day 13:
  - Men's singles – Semifinals:
    - **Rafael Nadal** (ESP) [1] def. Andy Murray (GBR) [4] 6–4, 7–5, 6–4
      - Nadal reaches his sixth French Open final in seven years, which ties Björn Borg's record for the Open era, and his twelfth Grand Slam final.
    - **Roger Federer** (SUI) [3] def. Novak Djokovic (SRB) [2] 7–6(5), 6–3, 3–6, 7–6(5)
      - Federer reaches his fifth French Open final, and his 23rd Grand Slam final.
      - Djokovic's 43-match winning streak ends, the third longest streak behind Ivan Lendl and Guillermo Vilas.
  - Women's doubles – Final: **Andrea Hlaváčková** (CZE)/**Lucie Hradecká** (CZE) def. Sania Mirza (IND)/Elena Vesnina (RUS) [7] 6–4, 6–3
    - Hlaváčková and Hradecká both win their first Grand Slam title.
  - Wheelchair men's singles Final: **Maikel Scheffers** (NED) def. Nicolas Peifer (FRA) 7–6(3), 6–3
    - Scheffers wins his first Grand Slam title.
  - Wheelchair women's singles Final: **Esther Vergeer** (NED) [1] def. Marjolein Buis (NED) 6–0, 6–2
    - Vergeer wins her fifth consecutive French Open singles title and her 18th Grand Slam singles title.
  - Wheelchair men's doubles Final: **Shingo Kunieda** (JPN)/**Peifer** (FRA) [1] def. Robin Ammerlaan (NED)/Stefan Olsson (SWE) 6–2, 6–3
    - Kunieda wins his third French Open doubles title, and tenth Grand Slam doubles title.
    - Peifer wins his first Grand Slam title.
  - Wheelchair women's doubles Final: **Vergeer** (NED)/**Sharon Walraven** (NED) [1] def. Jiske Griffioen (NED)/Aniek van Koot (NED) [2] 5–7, 6–4, [10–5]
    - Vergeer wins her fourth French Open doubles title, and 17th Grand Slam doubles title.
    - Walraven wins her fourth consecutive Grand Slam title.

==== Volleyball ====
- FIVB World League, Week 2 (team in **bold** advances to the final round):
  - Pool A: Puerto Rico 1–3 United States
    - Standings: Brazil 6 points (2 matches), United States 6 (3), **Poland** 3 (2), Puerto Rico 0 (3).
  - Pool B: Russia 3–0 Germany
    - Standings: Russia 9 points (3 matches), Bulgaria 3 (2), Germany 3 (3), Japan 0 (2).
  - Pool C:
    - Serbia 1–3 Finland
    - Portugal 0–3 Argentina
      - Standings (after 3 matches): Argentina 6 points, Portugal 5, Finland 4, Serbia 3.
- Men's European League, Leg 2:
  - Pool B: Spain 3–1 Austria
    - Standings: Greece 6 points (2 matches), Spain 6 (3), Netherlands 3 (2), Austria 0 (3).
- Women's European League, Leg 2:
  - Pool A:
    - Spain 0–3 Serbia
    - France 3–0 Greece
      - Standings (after 3 matches): Serbia 9 points, France 6, Spain 3, Greece 0.
  - Pool B:
    - Israel 0–3 Czech Republic
    - Hungary 1–3 Bulgaria
      - Standings (after 3 matches): Czech Republic, Bulgaria 6 points, Hungary, Israel 3.

=== June 2, 2011 (Thursday) ===
==== Basketball ====
- (United States) NBA Finals (best-of-7 series):
  - Game 2 in Miami: Dallas Mavericks 95, Miami Heat 93. Series tied 1–1.

==== Football (soccer) ====
- UEFA Women's U-19 Championship in Italy (teams in **bold** advance to the semi-finals):
  - Group A:
    - **Italy** 1–0 Switzerland in Cervia
    - Russia 3–1 Belgium in Forlì
      - Standings (after 2 matches): Italy 6 points, Switzerland, Russia 3, Belgium 0.
  - Group B:
    - **Germany** 1–0 Spain in Bellaria
    - Norway 3–0 Netherlands in Imola
      - Standings (after 2 matches): Germany 6 points, Norway 3, Spain, Netherlands 1.
- Copa Libertadores Semifinals, second leg: (first leg score in parentheses)
  - Vélez Sarsfield (Argentina) 2–1 (0–1) (Uruguay) **Peñarol**. 3–3 on points, 2–2 on aggregate; Peñarol win on away goals.

==== Tennis ====
- French Open in Paris, France, day 12:
  - Women's singles – Semifinals:
    - **Li Na** (CHN) [6] def. Maria Sharapova (RUS) [7] 6–4, 7–5
      - Li reaches her second consecutive Grand Slam final.
    - **Francesca Schiavone** (ITA) [5] def. Marion Bartoli (FRA) [11] 6–3, 6–3
      - Schiavone reaches the final for the second successive year.
  - Mixed doubles – Final: **Casey Dellacqua** (AUS)/**Scott Lipsky** (USA) def. Katarina Srebotnik (SVK)/Nenad Zimonjić (SRB) [1] 7–6(6), 4–6, [10–7]
    - Dellacqua and Lipsky both win their first Grand Slam title.

==== Volleyball ====
- FIVB World League, Week 2:
  - Pool D: Italy 3–0 Cuba
    - Standings: Italy 9 points (3 matches), South Korea 3 (2), Cuba 3 (3), France 0 (2).

=== June 1, 2011 (Wednesday) ===
==== Basketball ====
- FIBA Asia Champions Cup in Pasig, Philippines (teams in **bold** advance to the quarterfinals):
  - Group A:
    - **Al-Ittihad Jeddah** (Saudi Arabia) 98–76 (Malaysia) KL Dragons
    - **ASU Sports** (Jordan) 74–76 (Philippines) **Smart Gilas**
      - Final standings: Smart Gilas 8 points, ASU Sports 7, Al-Ittihad Jeddah 6, (Iraq) **Duhok Sports Club** 5, KL Dragons 4.
  - Group B:
    - **Mahram Tehran** (Iran) 81–64 (Qatar) **Al-Rayyan Sports**
    - **Al-Riyadi Beirut** (Lebanon) 86–73 (Syria) **Al-Jalaa Aleppo**
      - Final standings: Al-Riyadi Beirut 8 points, Mahram Tehran 7, Al-Rayyan Sports 6, Al-Jalaa Aleppo 5, (United Arab Emirates) Al Shabab 4.

==== Football (soccer) ====
- Friendly international: (top 10 in FIFA World Rankings)
  - Nigeria 4–1 (5) Argentina
- Copa Libertadores Semifinals, second leg: (first leg score in parentheses)
  - Cerro Porteño (Paraguay) 3–3 (0–1) (Brazil) **Santos**. Santos win 4–1 on points.
- (Brazil) Copa do Brasil Finals, first leg: Vasco da Gama 1–0 Coritiba

==== Ice hockey ====
- Stanley Cup Finals (best-of-7 series):
  - Game 1 in Vancouver: Vancouver Canucks 1, Boston Bruins 0. Canucks lead series 1–0.

==== Rugby union ====
- IRB Junior World Trophy in Georgia (teams in **bold** advance to the final):
  - Group A:
    - Uruguay 33–5 United States
    - **Samoa** 50–14 Russia
      - Final standings: Samoa 15 points, Uruguay 9, Russia 5, United States 2.
  - Group B:
    - Canada 49–23 Zimbabwe
    - Georgia 14–29 **Japan**
      - Final standings: Japan 14 points, Georgia 10, Canada 5, Zimbabwe 0.

==== Tennis ====
- French Open in Paris, France, day 11:
  - Men's singles – Quarterfinals:
    - **Rafael Nadal** (ESP) [1] def. Robin Söderling (SWE) [5] 6–4, 6–1, 7–6(3)
    - **Andy Murray** (GBR) [4] def. Juan Ignacio Chela (ARG) 7–6(2), 7–5, 6–2
  - Women's singles – Quarterfinals:
    - **Li Na** (CHN) [6] def. Victoria Azarenka (BLR) [4] 7–5, 6–2
    - **Maria Sharapova** (RUS) [7] def. Andrea Petkovic (GER) [15] 6–0, 6–3
