= 2011 World Youth Championships in Athletics – Girls' pole vault =

Girls' pole vault at the 2011 World Youth Championships in Athletics
- Venue: Stadium Lille Métropole
- Dates: 7 July (qualification); 9 July (final)
- Competitors: 24
- Winning height: 4.25 WYL

Medalists
gold medal	Desiree Singh	Germany
silver medal	Liz Parnov	Australia
bronze medal	Lucy Bryan	Great Britain

The girls' pole vault at the 2011 World Youth Championships in Athletics was held at the Stadium Lille Métropole on 7 and 9 July.

== Medalists ==
Gold	Silver	Bronze
Desiree Singh; Germany	Liz Parnov; Australia	Lucy Bryan; Great Britain

== Records ==
Prior to the competition, the following records were as follows.

World Youth Best	Angelica Bengtsson (SWE)	4.47	Moscow, Russia	22 May 2010
Championship Record	Vicky Parnov (AUS)	4.35	Ostrava, Czech Republic	14 July 2007
World Youth Leading	Desiree Singh (GER)	4.24	Holzminden, Germany	11 June 2011

== Qualification ==
Qualification rule: qualification standard 3.90 m or at least best 12 qualified.

=== Group A ===
Rank	Name	Nationality	3.35	3.50	3.65	3.75	3.85	3.90	Result	Notes
1	Alissa Söderberg	Sweden	–	–	o	o	o		3.85	q
1	Paris McCathrion	Australia	–	–	o	o	o		3.85	q
3	Roberta Bruni	Italy	–	–	–	o	xo		3.85	q
3	Franziska Kappes	Germany	–	–	o	o	xo		3.85	q
5	Kristina Bondarenko	Russia	–	o	–	xo	xo		3.85	q
6	Elmas Seda Fırtına	Turkey	–	o	xo	xo	xxx		3.75	
7	Maëva Alves	France	o	xxo	xxo	xo	xxx		3.75	PB
8	Robin Bone	Canada	–	–	o	xxo	xxx		3.75	
9	Lu Shaowen	China	–	xo	xo	xxo	xxx		3.75	
10	Laura Izquierdo	Spain	–	o	xo	xxx			3.65	
11	Margaux Quirin	Belgium	o	o	xxx				3.50	
	Mette Gravlund Hansen	Denmark	xxx						NM	

=== Group B ===
Rank	Name	Nationality	3.35	3.50	3.65	3.75	3.85	3.90	Result	Notes
1	Liz Parnov	Australia	–	–	–	–	–	o	3.90	Q
2	Desiree Singh	Germany	–	–	–	o	o		3.85	q
2	Lucy Bryan	Great Britain	–	o	o	o	o		3.85	q
2	Clara Amat	Spain	o	o	o	o	o		3.85	q, PB
2	Sydney White	United States	–	o	o	o	o		3.85	q
6	Georgia Stefanidi	Greece	–	o	o	xo	o		3.85	q
7	Alysha Newman	Canada	–	xxo	o	xxo	xxo		3.85	q
8	Taisiya Molkova	Russia	–	o	–	o	xxx		3.75	
8	Choi Ye-eun	South Korea	o	o	o	o	xxx		3.75	PB
10	Ninon Guillon-Romarin	France	o	o	xx–	x			3.50	
10	Getter Lemberg	Estonia	o	o	xxx				3.50	
	Maryna Kylypko	Ukraine	–	xxx					NM	

== Final ==
Rank	Name	Nationality	3.60	3.75	3.90	4.00	4.10	4.15	4.20	4.25	4.32	Result	Notes
1st place, gold medalist(s)	Desiree Singh	Germany	–	o	o	xo	xxo	o	xo	xo	xxx	4.25	WYL
2nd place, silver medalist(s)	Liz Parnov	Australia	–	–	–	o	o	–	xo	xxx		4.20	SB
3rd place, bronze medalist(s)	Lucy Bryan	Great Britain	o	o	o	xo	o	xxx				4.10	PB
4	Georgia Stefanidi	Greece	o	o	xo	xo	o	xxx				4.10	PB
5	Alissa Söderberg	Sweden	o	o	xo	xxo	o	xxx				4.10	PB
6	Roberta Bruni	Italy	–	o	o	o	x–	xx				4.00	
7	Kristina Bondarenko	Russia	xo	xo	o	o	xxx					4.00	PB
8	Sydney White	United States	o	xo	o	xo	xxx					4.00	PB
9	Paris McCathrion	Australia	o	o	o	xxx						3.90	
10	Clara Amat	Spain	o	xo	o	xxx						3.90	PB
11	Franziska Kappes	Germany	o	o	xo	xxx						3.90	PB
12	Alysha Newman	Canada	xxo	o	xxx							3.75	
