= 2011 Oceania Youth Athletics Championships =

XI Oceania Youth Athletics Championships
- Dates: March 10–14
- Host city: Sydney, New South Wales, Australia
- Venue: Sydney Olympic Park Athletic Centre
- Level: Youth
- Events: 40 (20 boys, 20 girls)
- Participation: 356 athletes from 3 (2 + 8 Australian States and Territories) nations

The 2011 Oceania Youth Athletics Championships were held at the Sydney Olympic Park Athletic Centre in Homebush, New South Wales, Australia, between March 10–14, 2011. They were held together with the 2011 Australian Junior Athletics Championships (U14 to U20). A total of 40 events were contested, 20 by boys and 20 by girls.

== Medal summary ==
Complete results can be found on the websites of the Athletics Australia, and of the World Junior Athletics History.

=== Boys under 18 (Youth) ===
Event	Gold		Silver		Bronze	
100 metres (wind: 3.4m/s)	(New South Wales) Jarrod Geddes (NSW)	10.45 w	(Queensland) Hugh Donovan (QLD)	10.49 w	(New South Wales) Julian Roussety (NSW)	10.62 w
200 metres (wind: 0.2m/s)	Joshua Hawkins (NZL)	21.38	(Queensland) Hugh Donovan (QLD)	21.60	(New South Wales) Rod Wainwright (NSW)	21.79
400 metres	(Victoria (state)) Jack Sheridan (VIC)	47.32	(Victoria (state)) Jarryd Buchan (VIC)	47.36	(Tasmania) Max Waldron (TAS)	47.76
800 metres	(Victoria (state)) Timas Harik (VIC)	1:54.69	(New South Wales) Robert Dredge (NSW)	1:54.72	(New South Wales) Jordan Gusman (NSW)	1:55.62
1500 metres	(Queensland) Jack Curran (QLD)	3:53.78	(Victoria (state)) Kyle Martin-Alcaide (VIC)	3:55.82	Kieron McDonald (NZL)	3:56.74
3000 metres	(South Australia) Luke Hargreaves (SA)	8:27.68	(Queensland) Patrick Tiernan (QLD)	8:33.57	(South Australia) Jacob Cocks (SA)	8:39.53
2000 metres steeplechase	(South Australia) Jacob Cocks (SA)	5:56.72	(New South Wales) Nathan Derriman (NSW)	6:09.73	(Queensland) Julian Watkins (QLD)	6:17.81
110 metres hurdles (wind: 0.6m/s)	(New South Wales) Jack Edwards (NSW)	13.89	Joshua Hawkins (NZL)	14.01	(Queensland) Anthony Collins (QLD)	14.04
400 metres hurdles	(New South Wales) Jack Bangel (NSW)	52.13	(Queensland) George Freeman (QLD)	52.58	(New South Wales) Christian Lozada (NSW)	52.76
High jump	(New South Wales) David Snowdon (NSW)	2.10	(Queensland) David Fulton (QLD)	1.96	(South Australia) William Fry (SA)	1.96
Pole vault	(Victoria (state)) Brodie Cross (VIC)	4.55	(Victoria (state)) Jack Ingram (VIC)	4.25	(Victoria (state)) Angus McLardie (VIC)	3.70
Long jump	(New South Wales) Jake Stein (NSW)	7.15 (wind: 0.0m/s)	(Australian Capital Territory) Angus Gould (ACT)	6.99 (wind: 0.3m/s)	(Queensland) Khaele Bowen (QLD)	6.98 (wind: -1.0m/s)
Triple jump	(New South Wales) Benjamin Cox (NSW)	14.37 (wind: 0.0m/s)	(Victoria (state)) Jagmandip Gill (VIC)	14.02 (wind: -1.4m/s)	(Victoria (state)) Tom Hardeman (VIC)	13.31 (wind: 0.0m/s)
Shot put	(New South Wales) Jake Stein (NSW)	16.78	Alex Fafeita (NZL)	16.51	(Western Australia) Cruz Hogan (WA)	15.61
Discus throw	(Queensland) Mitchell Cooper (QLD)	55.87	(New South Wales) Jake Stein (NSW)	53.10	Richard Callister (NZL)	50.93
Hammer throw	Alex Fafeita (NZL)	59.84	(Victoria (state)) Jack Dalton (VIC)	59.48	(Victoria (state)) Lachlan Freestone (VIC)	53.74
Javelin throw	(Queensland) William White (QLD)	71.56	(New South Wales) Elliott Lang (NSW)	71.23	(Western Australia) Darren Howard (WA)	68.74
5000 metres Walk	(Queensland) Brad Aiton (QLD)	21:27.09	Matthew Holcroft (NZL)	22:36.29	(New South Wales) Steven Washburn (NSW)	23:09.22
4 x 100 metres relay	New South Wales; Julian Roussety; Jarrod Geddes; Abdel Elkout; Rod Wainwright	41.25	Queensland; Luke Wilkinson; Hugh Donovan; Loxley Davies; Anthony Collins	42.14	New Zealand; Joshua Hawkins; Blair Grant; Jonty Rae; Dalton Coppins	42.39
4 x 400 metres relay	Victoria; Adam Fegan; Will Johns; Jarryd Buchan; Jack Sheridan	3:19.14	New South Wales; Benjamin Ambrose; Jackson Lowe; Jack Bangel; Christian Lozada	3:22.15	Queensland; Jay Meaney; Jack Aird; Ben Seymour; Samuel Cook	3:22.39

=== Girls under 18 (Youth) ===
Event	Gold		Silver		Bronze	
100 metres (wind: 2.8m/s)	(Victoria (state)) Sophie Taylor (VIC)	11.70 w	(Victoria (state)) Monica Brennan (VIC)	11.83 w	(New South Wales) Tavleen Singh (NSW)	12.13 w
200 metres (wind: 0.1m/s)	(Victoria (state)) Sophie Taylor (VIC)	24.15	(Victoria (state)) Monica Brennan (VIC)	24.26	(Victoria (state)) Angela Byrne (VIC)	24.79
400 metres	(Victoria (state)) Alexandra Bulic (VIC)	55.76	(Tasmania) Abbey De La Motte (TAS)	55.81	(Queensland) Eliza Bowers (QLD)	55.82
800 metres	(New South Wales) Anna Laman (NSW)	2:06.49	(New South Wales) Jenny Blundell (NSW)	2:08.66	(Victoria (state)) Rochelle Kennedy (VIC)	2:09.63
1500 metres	(New South Wales) Anna Laman (NSW)	4:22.94	(Queensland) Katelyn Simpson (QLD)	4:23.31	(New South Wales) Hannah Wrigley (NSW)	4:29.03
3000 metres	(Queensland) Leshay Wells (QLD)	9:53.82	(Queensland) Helen Baade (QLD)	9:57.56	(Tasmania) Natalea Smith (TAS)	9:58.03
2000 metres steeplechase	(South Australia) Leila Johnson (SA)	7:07.82	(Victoria (state)) Alanah Hayes (VIC)	7:25.36	(New South Wales) Holly Ratajec (NSW)	8:11.50
100 metres hurdles (wind: 2.6m/s)	(New South Wales) Abbie Taddeo (NSW)	13.46 w	(Queensland) Taneille Crase (QLD)	13.72 w	(South Australia) Margaret Gayen (SA)	13.94 w
400 metres hurdles	(Australian Capital Territory) Chloe Jamieson (ACT)	60.37	(New South Wales) Sarah Carli (NSW)	60.86	(Queensland) Tatum Shaw (QLD)	61.11
High jump	(Tasmania) Kaitlin Morgan (TAS)	1.86	Keeley O'Hagan (NZL)	1.76	(New South Wales) Emily Crutcher (NSW)	1.76
Pole vault	(Victoria (state)) Paris McCathrion (VIC)	3.90	(Western Australia) Liz Parnov (WA)	3.85	(Victoria (state)) Madeline Lawson (VIC)	3.50
Long jump	(South Australia) Margaret Gayen (SA)	5.89 (wind: 0.5m/s)	(Queensland) Demii Maher-Smith (QLD)	5.79 (wind: 1.1m/s)	(New South Wales) Natalie Apikotoa (NSW)	5.74 (wind: 1.6m/s)
Triple jump	(Queensland) Demii Maher-Smith (QLD)	12.64 w (wind: 2.1m/s)	(New South Wales) Natalie Apikotoa (NSW)	12.61 w (wind: 3.2m/s)	(Tasmania) Kaitlin Morgan (TAS)	12.57 w (wind: 3.9m/s)
Shot put	(New South Wales) Filoi Aokuso (NSW)	14.27	(New South Wales) Taylah Sengul (NSW)	13.72	Siositina Hakeai (NZL)	13.59
Discus throw	(New South Wales) Filoi Aokuso (NSW)	49.56	(Queensland) Keshia McGrath-Volau (QLD)	47.16	(New South Wales) Taylah Sengul (NSW)	46.97
Hammer throw	(Tasmania) Danielle McConnell (TAS)	56.16	(Tasmania) Rebecca Direen (TAS)	48.63	(Victoria (state)) Roxanne Kellow (VIC)	45.38
Javelin throw	(Victoria (state)) Monique Cilione (VIC)	52.16	(Queensland) Wasie Toolis (QLD)	47.12	(Queensland) Winifred Parker (QLD)	38.70
5000 metres Walk	(New South Wales) Amy Bettiol (NSW)	24:10.73	(Victoria (state)) Amy Burren (VIC)	24:25.44	(Queensland) Jessica Pickles (QLD)	24:53.27
4 x 100 metres relay	Victoria; Brittany Burkitt; Angela Byrne; Sophie Taylor; Monica Brennan	46.73	New South Wales; Samantha Hulme; Tavleen Singh; Dejanee Defoe; Ella Nelson	47.21	Queensland; Taneille Crase; Stevie-Marie Murdoch; Monique Hastie; Larissa Chambers	47.63
4 x 400 metres relay	Victoria; Rebecca Luke; Adelaide Robertson; Renee Doggett; Alexandra Bulic	3:50.21	Queensland; Emma Lawrence; Tatum Shaw; Taylor Mccann; Eliza Bowers	3:50.87	New South Wales; Tia O'Carroll; Jess Stafford; Jacarna Bain-Fenton; Dejanee Defoe	3:51.76

== Medal table (unofficial) ==
* Host nation (New South Wales)

Rank	Nation	Gold	Silver	Bronze	Total
1	New South Wales*	14	10	12	36
2	Victoria	11	9	7	27
3	Queensland	6	13	9	28
4	South Australia	4	0	3	7
5	New Zealand	2	4	4	10
6	Tasmania	2	2	3	7
7	Australian Capital Territory	1	1	0	2
8	Western Australia	0	1	2	3
Totals (8 entries)		40	40	40	120

== Participation (unofficial) ==
An unofficial count yields the number of about 356 athletes from 3 countries. 331 athletes were from the 8 Australian States and Territories:

- Australian Capital Territory
- New South Wales
- Northern Territory (1)
- Queensland
- South Australia
- Tasmania
- Victoria
- Western Australia

and 25 athletes from a combined team "Oceania" composed of 2 other OAA member countries:

- Fiji (2)
- New Zealand (23)
