= Australian Survivor: Heroes V Villains =

Australian reality show

- Season 10
- Presented by: Jonathan LaPaglia
- No. of days: 47
- No. of castaways: 24
- Winner: Liz Parnov
- Runners-up: Gerry Geltch; Matt Sharp
- Location: Upolu, Samoa
- No. of episodes: 24

Release
- Original network: Network 10
- Original release: 30 January – 27 March 2023

Additional information
- Filming dates: 9 August – 24 September 2022

Season chronology
- ← Previous; Blood V Water Next → Titans V Rebels

Australian Survivor: Heroes V Villains is the tenth season of Australian Survivor, which premiered on Network 10 on 30 January 2023 and is based on the international reality competition franchise Survivor. In this season, based on the twentieth American series and carrying the same sub-title, new and returning players were divided into two tribes of Heroes and Villains. Liz Parnov was named the winner of the season, defeating Gerry Geltch and Matt Sharp in a 7–0–0 vote.

The season was filmed in Upolu, Samoa, marking the third time Australian Survivor had filmed there (the first being in 2016 and the second being in 2017).

== Contestants ==
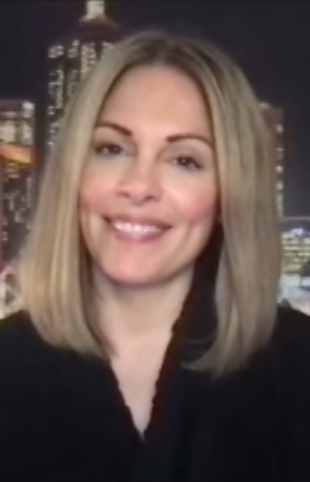
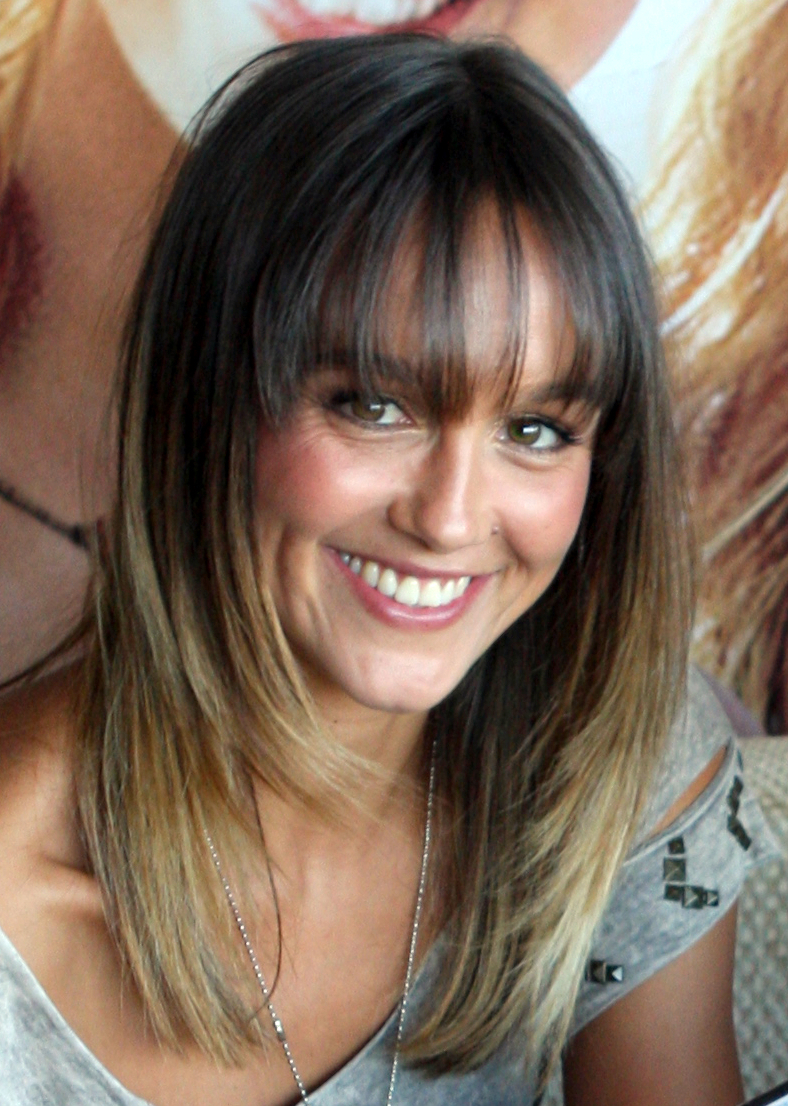
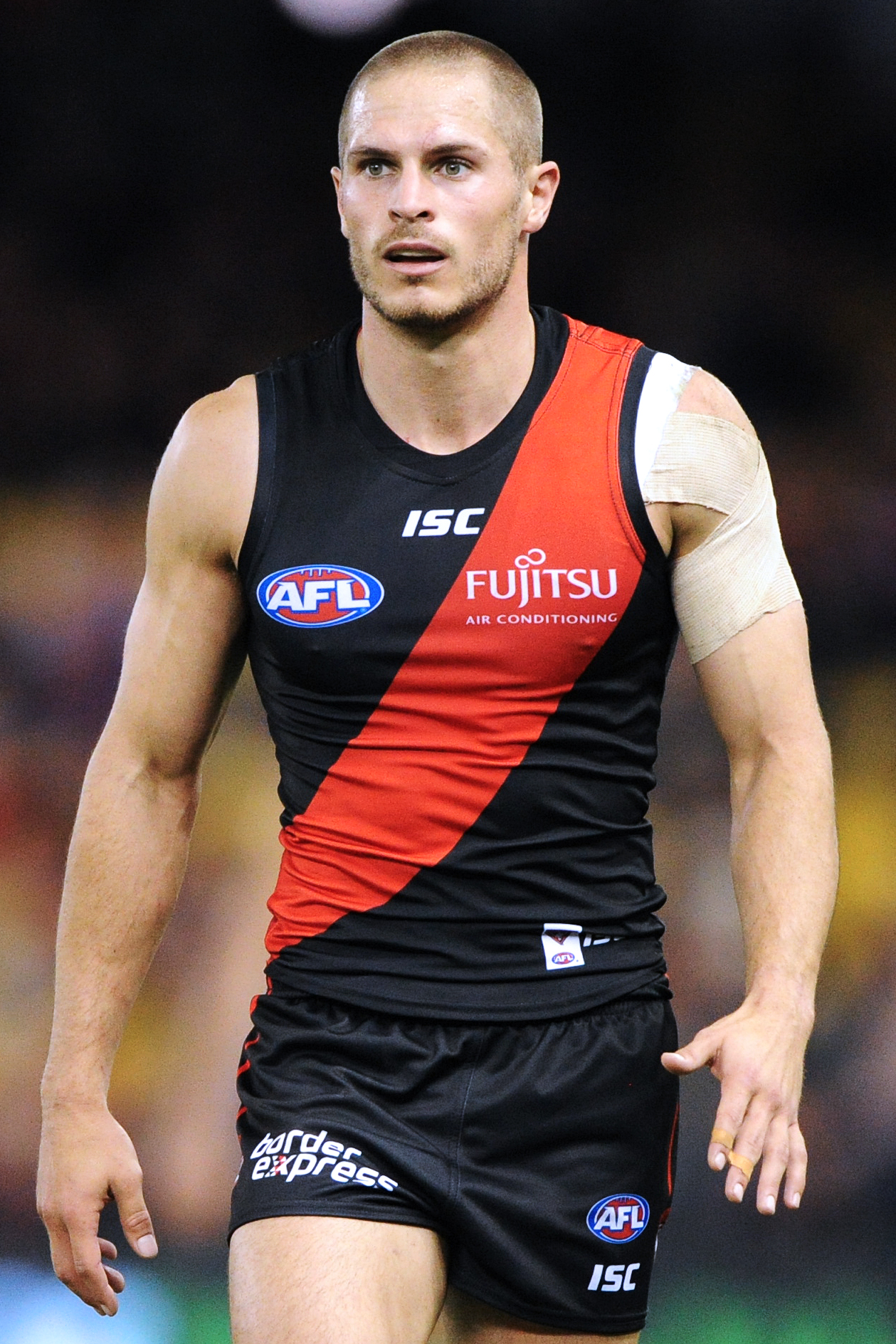
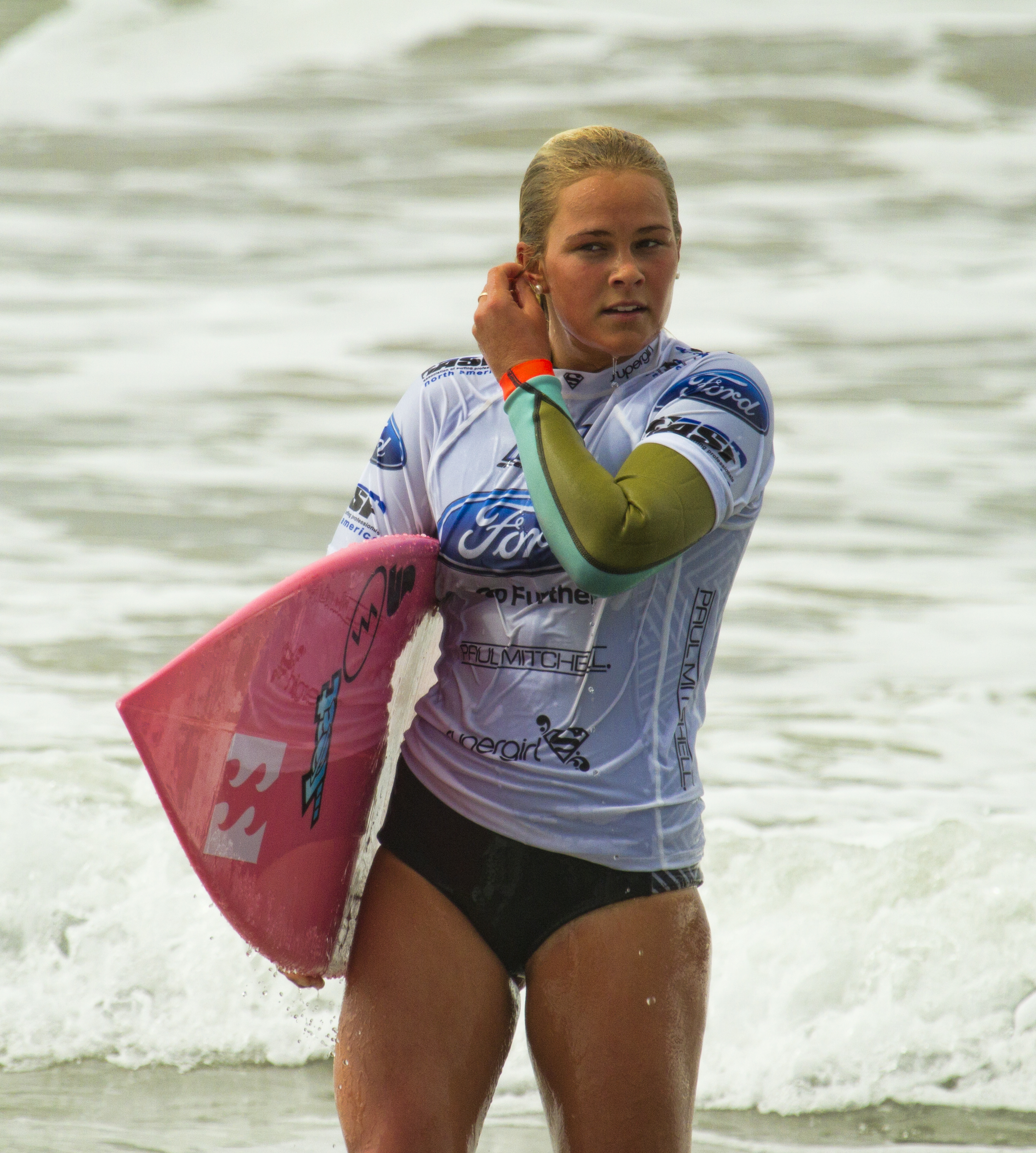
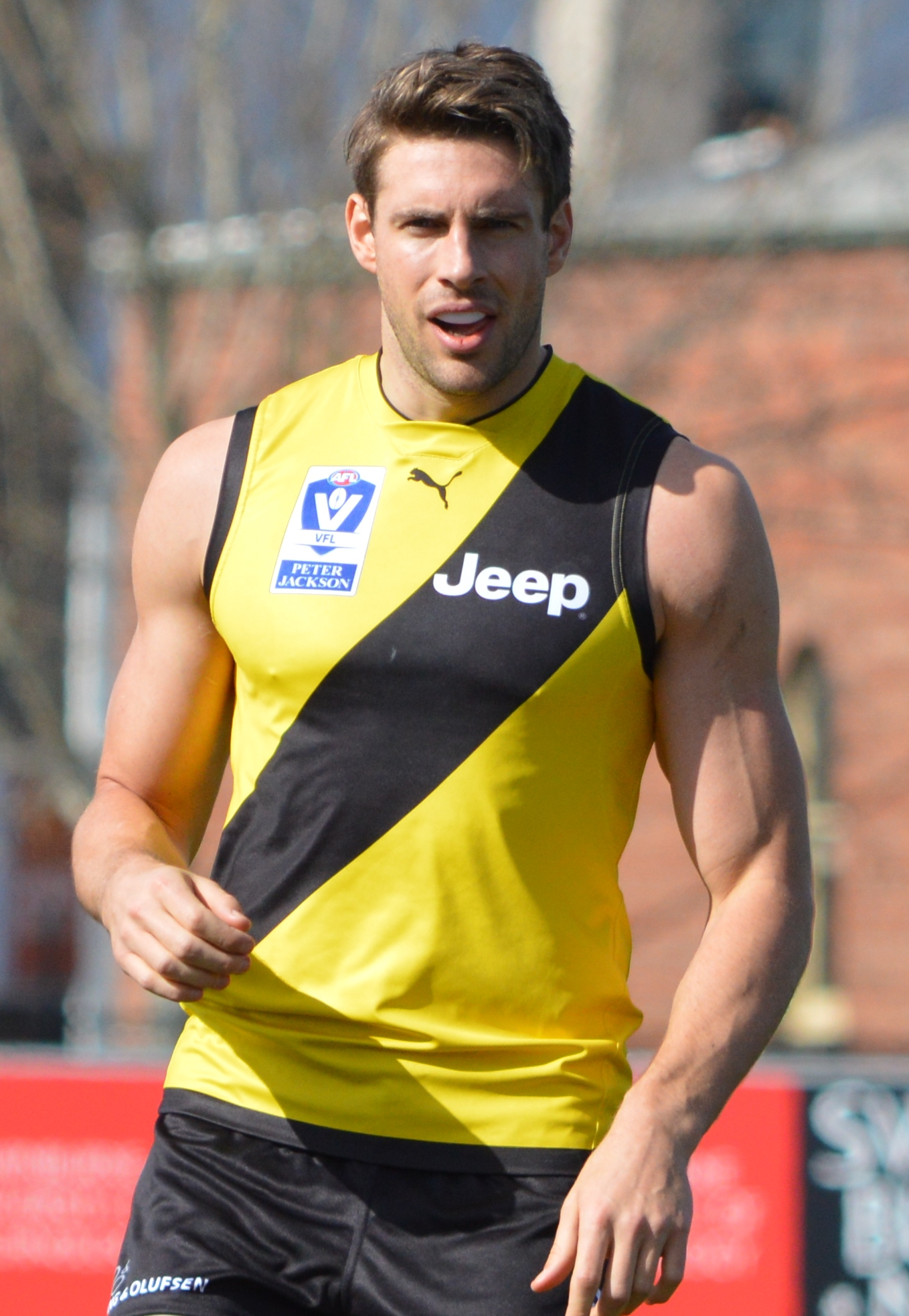
From left to right: Anjali Rao, Sharni Vinson, David Zaharakis, Flick Palmateer and Shaun Hampson

The 24 contestants, which consist of 13 new contestants and 11 returnees from previous seasons, were divided into two tribes Heroes and Villains. The new contestants were divided based on how they see themselves playing the game, while the returnees were divided based on their previous style of game play. The cast includes news anchor Anjali Rao, author Benjamin Law, AFL footballer David Zaharakis, Olympic pole vaulter Liz Parnov and actress Sharni Vinson.

| Contestant | Original tribe | Post-Swap tribes (Note: Jonathan informed the Heroes at Tribal Council of Day 12 that instead of voting someone out, they would vote someone to join the Villains tribe. If that same person would survive two days at the Villains, they would return to the Heroes. Gerry survived the Swap twist, therefore, he returned to the Heroes on day 15.) | Original tribe #2 | Shuffled tribes | Post-mutiny tribes | Merged tribe | Finish |
| Jackie Glazier; 49, Melbourne, Victoria; Champions V Contenders | Villains | | | | | | Medically evacuated Day 2 |
| Anjali Rao; 48, Melbourne, Victoria; News anchor | Villains | | | | | | 1st voted out Day 2 |
| Michael Warren; 44, Sydney, New South Wales; Journalist | Villains | | | | | | 2nd voted out Day 5 |
| Mimi Tang; 30, Melbourne, Victoria; Luxury car PR owner | Villains | | | | | | 3rd voted out Day 7 |
| Rogue Rubin; 40, Melbourne, Victoria; Animal activist | Heroes | | | | | | 4th voted out Day 9 |
| Sarah Marschke; 23, Sydney, New South Wales; Former Miss World Australia | Villains | Villains | | | | | 5th voted out Day 14 |
| Fraser Lack; 25, Melbourne, Victoria; Real estate manager | Villains | Villains | Villains | | | | 6th voted out Day 15 |
| Sharni Vinson; 39, Sydney, New South Wales; Actress | Heroes | Heroes | Heroes | | | | 7th voted out Day 17 |
| Paige Donald; 26, Tambo, Queensland; Jillaroo | Heroes | Heroes | Heroes | Heroes | | | 8th voted out Day 19 |
| Jordie Hansen; 26, Melbourne, Victoria; Blood V Water | Villains | Villains | Villains | Villains | | | 9th voted out Day 21 |
| Benjamin Law; 40, Nambour, Queensland; Author | Heroes | Heroes | Heroes | Heroes | | | 10th voted out Day 22 |
| Steve "Stevie" Khouw; 62, Sydney; Champions V Contenders | Villains | Villains | Villains | Heroes | Heroes | | 11th voted out Day 27 |
| David Zaharakis; 32, Melbourne, Victoria; Former AFL player | Heroes | Heroes | Heroes | Villains | Villains | Fa'amolemole | 12th voted out Day 29 |
| Felicity "Flick" Palmateer; 30, Margaret River, Western Australia; Brains V Brawn | Heroes | Heroes | Heroes | Heroes | Heroes | Fa'amolemole | 13th voted out 1st jury member Day 31 |
| Sam Webb; 34, Sydney, New South Wales; 2016 | Heroes | Heroes | Heroes | Villains | Villains | Fa'amolemole | 14th voted out 2nd jury member Day 33 |
| Shonee Bowtell; 30, Noosa Heads, Queensland; Champions V Contenders & All Stars | Villains | Villains | Villains | Heroes | Heroes | Fa'amolemole | 15th voted out ~~3rd jury member~~ (Note: On Day 45, the Final 4 had to vote for a jury member to be removed, which the majority decided on Shonee.); Day 35 |
| Shaun Hampson; 34, Melbourne, Victoria; Champions V Contenders II | Heroes | Heroes | Heroes | Villains | Villains | Fa'amolemole | 16th voted out 3rd jury member Day 37 |
| Hayley Leake; 32, Adelaide, South Australia; Brains V Brawn | Heroes | Heroes | Heroes | Villains | Villains | Fa'amolemole | 17th voted out 4th jury member Day 39 |
| Simon Mee; 33, Brisbane, Queensland; Brains V Brawn | Villains | Villains | Villains | Villains | Villains | Fa'amolemole | 18th voted out 5th jury member Day 42 |
| Alanna "Nina" Twine; 25, Fayetteville, North Carolina, USA; Blood V Water | Heroes | Heroes | Heroes | Villains | Villains | Fa'amolemole | 19th voted out 6th jury member Day 44 |
| George Mladenov; 32, Bankstown, New South Wales; Brains V Brawn | Villains | Villains | Villains | Heroes | Heroes | Fa'amolemole | 20th voted out 7th jury member Day 46 |
| Gerry Geltch; 62, Fraser Island, Queensland; Tourism pilot | Heroes | Villains | Heroes | Heroes | Heroes | Fa'amolemole | Co runner-up Day 47 |
| Matt Sharp; 25, Gold Coast, Queensland; Lifeguard | Heroes | Heroes | Heroes | Heroes | Heroes | Fa'amolemole | Co runner-up Day 47 |
| Liz Parnov; 28, Perth, Western Australia; Olympic pole vaulter | Villains | Villains | Villains | Villains | Heroes | Fa'amolemole | Sole Survivor; Day 47 |

=== Future appearances ===
In 2025, George Mladenov and Shonee Bowtell competed on Australian Survivor: Australia V The World.

In 2026, Simon Mee competed on Australian Survivor: Redemption.

Outside of Survivor, George Mladenov appeared on Dogs Behaving (Very) Badly and competed on The Amazing Race Australian: Celebrity Edition in 2023 with his sister Pam. In 2024, Nina Twine competed on the USA Network show The Anonymous. In 2025, Mladenov competed on Deal or No Deal. Twine competed on the second season of Extracted in 2026.

== Season summary ==
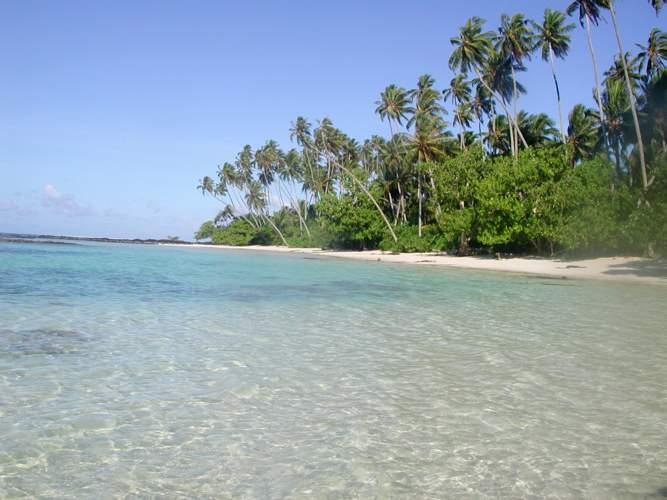
The season filmed in Upolu in Samoa.

Thirteen new players and eleven returnees arrived in Samoa, where they were divided into two tribes based on their personality, occupation and/or past gameplay: “Heroes” and “Villains”. The Heroes dominated the early immunity challenges, with a hierarchy forming around the strong men like Shaun and Sam while social threats like Hayley and Flick kept the target focused on the weaker members. The Villains tribe was primarily run by the "Spice Girls" trio of George, Shonee and Liz, with Simon and Jordie winding up in the minority.

After a tribe swap, George and Shonee successfully took control of the new Heroes tribe while the “alpha males” dominated the new Villains tribe under Shaun's leadership. Both swapped tribes openly exchanged information and advantages during challenges, including immunity idols. Liz found herself at the bottom of her new tribe, but when given the opportunity to mutiny to the other tribe shortly before the merge, she accepted, rejoining Shonee and George.

At the merge, George and the other Villains pulled in former Heroes Hayley, Gerry and Matt to form a new majority called “the Vigilantes”. The alliance picked off the minority one by one, with George pre-empting several blindside attempts against him by betraying former allies like Shonee and Hayley. George planned to go to the end with Matt and Gerry, but was foiled when Liz won the final two immunity challenges, resulting in George being voted out in fourth place.

Liz, Matt and Gerry then faced the jury at the final tribal council, where all three were questioned on what moves they made outside of George's influence. Matt was criticised for his lack of independent strategy, while Gerry was criticised for failing to make strong social bonds with the jury. Liz took credit for taking revenge against George on behalf of Shonee, and the jury voted unanimously in her favour, awarding her the $500,000 and title of Sole Survivor.

Challenge winners and eliminations by episode

Tribal phase (Days 1–27)
| Episode | | Challenge winner(s) | | Eliminated | Finish |
| No. | Original air date | Reward | Immunity | Eliminated | Finish |
|---|---|---|---|---|---|
| 1 | 30 January 2023 | Heroes | Heroes | Jackie | Medically evacuated Day 2 |
| 1 | 30 January 2023 | Heroes | Heroes | Anjali | 1st voted out Day 2 |
| 2 | 31 January 2023 | Villains | Heroes | Michael | 2nd voted out Day 5 |
| 3 | 1 February 2023 | Villains | Heroes | Mimi | 3rd voted out Day 7 |
| 4 | 5 February 2023 | Heroes | Villains | Rogue | 4th voted out Day 9 |
| 5 | 6 February 2023 | Heroes | Villains | No elimination on Day 12 due to a tribe swap vote. | |
| 6 | 7 February 2023 | Heroes | Heroes | Sarah | 5th voted out Day 14 |
| 7 | 12 February 2023 | None | Heroes | Fraser | 6th voted out Day 15 |
| 7 | 12 February 2023 | None | Simon (Note: At Day 15's Tribal Council, a special Individual Challenge was held. This challenge was won by Simon) | Fraser | 6th voted out Day 15 |
| 8 | 13 February 2023 | None | Villains | Sharni | 7th voted out Day 17 |
| 9 | 14 February 2023 | Survivor; Auction | Villains | Paige | 8th voted out Day 19 |
| 10 | 19 February 2023 | Villains | Heroes | Jordie | 9th voted out Day 21 |
| 11 | 20 February 2023 | None | Villains | Benjamin | 10th voted out Day 22 |
| 12 | 21 February 2023 | Villains | Heroes | No elimination on Day 25 due to the mutiny offer. (Note: Instead of voting out a member of the tribe, Villains were offered a chance to mutiny and join Heroes. Only One castaway could mutiny. Liz chose to mutiny.) | |
| 13 | 26 February 2023 | Villains | Villains | Stevie | 11th voted out Day 27 |

Merge phase (Days 28–47)
| Episode | | Challenge winner(s) | | Eliminated | Finish |
| No. | Original air date | Reward | Immunity | Eliminated | Finish |
|---|---|---|---|---|---|
| 14 | 27 February 2023 | None (Note: No Reward Challenge, due to the Merge.) | Matt | David | 12th voted out Day 29 |
| 15 | 28 February 2023 | None | Liz | Flick | 13th voted out 1st jury member Day 31 |
| 16 | 5 March 2023 | George, Hayley [Gerry, Shonee] | Simon | Sam | 14th voted out 2nd jury member Day 33 |
| 17 | 6 March 2023 | None | Simon | Shonee | 15th voted out ~~3rd jury member~~ (Note: On Day 45, the Final 4 had to vote for a jury member to be removed, which Matt earning an extra vote for winning the reward. The majority decided on Shonee.); Day 35 |
| 18 | 7 March 2023 | Simon [Hayley, Matt, Nina] | Nina | Shaun | 16th voted out 4th jury member Day 37 |
| 19 | 12 March 2023 | Liz [George, Nina] | Simon | Hayley | 17th voted out 5th jury member Day 39 |
| 20 | 13 March 2023 | None | Matt | No elimination on Day 41 due to the Isolation twist. (Note: Instead of voting out a member of the tribe, Fa'amolemole were informed after the vote that the two castaways to receive the most votes at this Tribal Council would be isolated from the tribe until the next Tribal Council. The two Isolated can only eat what is sent to them by the tribe, and cannot participate at the next Immunity Challenge. If they survive the next vote, they rejoin the tribe. Nina and Gerry received the most votes and were Isolated from the tribe.) | |
| 21 | 19 March 2023 | None | Matt | Simon | 18th voted out 6th jury member Day 42 |
| 22 | 20 March 2023 | None | Liz | Nina | 19th voted out 7th jury member Day 44 |
| 23 | 26 March 2023 | Matt | No immunity challenge or elimination on Day 45 due to the Jury Elimination. | | |
| 24 | 27 March 2023 | None | Liz | George | 20th voted out 8th jury member Day 46 |
| 24 | 27 March 2023 | | | Final vote | |
| 24 | 27 March 2023 | | | Matt | Co-Runner-up; Day 47 |
| 24 | 27 March 2023 | | | Gerry | Co-Runner-up; Day 47 |
| 24 | 27 March 2023 | | | Liz | Sole Survivor; Day 47 |

== Episodes ==
| No. overall | No. in season | Title | Timeline | Original release date |
|---|---|---|---|---|
| 199 | 1 | "Episode 1" | Days 1–2 | 30 January 2023 |
Twenty-four players arrive in Samoa, of which half are returning players. They are divided into two tribes reflecting their line of work or style of Survivor play: Heroes and Villains. Jonathan welcomes the players to the game, and introduces them to their first reward challenge.: Reward challenge: Both tribes face off gathering supplies scattered across an arena, carrying them to an elevated platform to claim for their tribe. Both tribes must then get all of their members up to the top of the elevated platform, then one player must race to collect a torch and bring it back to their tribe. First tribe to retrieve their torch wins reward and gets to keep all of their supplies.; Despite the Villains' early lead and strategy of stealing from the other team's platform, Heroes win reward. Back at the Villains' camp, Simon takes command of building the shelter, bonding early with Jordie. George begins looking for allies, making early bonds with Jackie and Anjali. Michael is eager to make a big move early and begins spreading the word that he wants to blindside George at the first Tribal Council. At the Heroes' camp, Hayley worries about her position in the tribe as the only former winner, hoping to push the target onto somebody else. She is hopeful when Rogue begins making insensitive comments to her tribemates, making people uncomfortable.: Immunity challenge: Both tribes traverse a mud pit and a wall of sticks before digging through a pile of coconuts for a sledgehammer. One player must then use the hammer to hit pegs into a ladder to allow two players to climb to the top of a tower. The players must then throw tomahawks at five suspended targets; the first team to knock down all five targets wins immunity.; Heroes win immunity. During the challenge, George and Jackie are injured in the mud pit and are taken to a nearby hospital for treatment. The remaining Villains return to camp and discuss whom to target in case George is unable to return. Shonee worries that she will be an easy target and begins to scramble for numbers, forming an alliance with Liz and petitioning to Simon that they target a non-threat like Anjali. Meanwhile, Anjali lobbies to get rid of Stevie, who is perceived as erratic and untrustworthy, and Simon agrees with her, though Anjali is unsure if she can trust him. Meanwhile, Stevie is out for revenge against Shonee after she blindsided him in their previous season, though he assures Shonee that they have buried the hatchet. At Tribal Council, Jonathan informs the Villains that Jackie and George are still being evaluated and will not be present at Tribal Council tonight. The tribe discusses how difficult it is to know whom to trust in this game. Stevie expresses concern that he could be on the chopping block, but denies holding a grudge against Shonee for their past history. Jordie hopes that the tribe will come out of this vote as a stronger and more cohesive unit. After the votes are cast, Jonathan informs the Villains that Jackie has been medically removed from the game and that George is still being treated, and may possibly be removed as well. He then gives the tribe the choice to either go back to camp without reading the votes, or continue with the elimination. After some discussion, the tribe agrees to continue with the vote and eliminate another player. Anjali is unanimously voted out, becoming the first person voted out of the game.
| 200 | 2 | "Episode 2" | Days 3–5 | 31 January 2023 |
George returns to the Villains camp, bemoaning his injured neck and forehead, though Simon and Jordie suspect he's playing it up for sympathy. Michael is disappointed by George's return and continues to plot against him; Simon also wants George out as soon as possible. Shonee and Liz discuss bringing in George as a potential ally and shield. At the Heroes camp, Paige is frustrated by the young guys slacking around camp, bonding instead with Hayley, Flick, and Gerry.: Reward challenge: Members of each tribe take turns facing off on a giant turnstile, attempting to push it across the enemy line. The first tribe to win three rounds gets to raid the opposing tribe's camp for fifteen minutes.; Villains win reward, and they disagree over how much damage to do to the Heroes’ camp. George wants to destroy their shelter and steal all their food, but Mimi convinces the others to show mercy and leave them with something to foster future goodwill. When the Heroes return to camp, they are pleased to see that their shelter is still standing and manage to restart the fire that the Villains doused with water.: Immunity challenge: Tribes race through an obstacle course and maneuver a giant ball up and over a ramp. Two members of each tribe then collect blocks to assemble a puzzle. First tribe to finish wins immunity.; Heroes win immunity after George and Fraser fail to complete the puzzle. Back at the Villains camp, Stevie is annoyed about being overruled by George on who should do the puzzle, and George apologises for his poor performance. Everyone is in agreement about targeting George, but Michael's shifty behavior starts to grate on his tribemates. Shonee appeals to Jordie and Simon to keep George as a shield for future votes, and suggests targeting Michael instead. Simon and Liz disagree, believing George is too dangerous to keep in the game. At Tribal Council, George thanks the tribe for their warm welcome when he re-entered the game. Simon recalls their chaotic afternoon and admits that his vote isn't 100% locked in tonight, which surprises Michael and Jordie. Michael reminds the tribe that George lost them the challenge on the puzzle, but Mimi defends George, saying the challenge was a group effort. When the votes are read, George and Stevie each receive a vote, but Michael becomes the second player voted out of the game.
| 201 | 3 | "Episode 3" | Days 6–7 | 1 February 2023 |
At the Villains camp, Simon and Jordie discuss their nervousness about still having George on the tribe. Shonee comments on Stevie's quirky presence around camp, believing that he is bad for her long-term game and planning to target him next if they lose immunity again.: Reward challenge: One member of each tribe races out to the water to collect a sandbag and carry it to their tribe's station before the other player. First tribe to win three rounds wins a giant jar of chocolate cookies.; Villains come back from behind to win reward. Back at the Heroes camp, the athletic men Shaun, Sam, David and Matt discuss a possible alliance of four, making Benjamin nervous about his place in the tribe. At the Villains camp, the tribe bonds over their cookies while George sneaks off to search for a hidden immunity idol, finding one in a tree trunk. Simon suspects that there may be an advantage hidden inside the cookie jar, but doesn't want to be caught digging through it. Mimi has no such concerns, sneaking out late that night to search through the jar, but she finds nothing. Liz secretly catches her in the act and tells the rest of the tribe in the morning, making them all suspicious of her.: Immunity challenge: Both tribes carry a heavy ladder through an obstacle course, then use it to climb up to release a net full of coconuts. Two players then toss the coconuts to break six tile targets. First tribe to break all their targets wins immunity.; Heroes win immunity. During the challenge, George secretly tips off Hayley to the possible location of the hidden immunity idol. Back at the Villains camp, Stevie proposes that Mimi goes home due to the cookie incident and her weak challenge performance, and Simon and Jordie agree. However, Shonee wants Stevie out because he threw her name out, despite his positive contributions around camp. George also wants to keep Mimi as an ally, tipping her off that she is a target and lobbying the other women to keep her. Meanwhile, Simon finds a wooden disc with a green gem in the centre, which he believes to be a hidden immunity idol, in the cookie jar. He tells Jordie about it and they hatch a plan to play it to save Stevie and blindside George. Simon decides to agree with the tribe's plan to vote unanimously for Stevie to ensure his plan works. However, Jordie begins to have second thoughts, worrying that his own threat level will be too high after getting rid of George. At Tribal Council, the tribe expresses frustration at their repeated immunity losses, but Simon believes the tribe is still strong enough to succeed moving forward. Jordie mentions the paranoia that the cookie jar brought to the camp, and the worry that somebody may have found an advantage. Mimi's vague answers suddenly make the other girls want to switch their vote to her, and they convince the boys to join them. Simon silently attempts to convince a reluctant Jordie to go through with his plan; Jordie privately asks Shonee and Liz if they would be okay with George going home, but they say no. After the votes are cast, Simon declines to play his object he found as an idol, and Mimi is voted out unanimously, becoming the third person voted out of the game. After his tribe leaves the room, Simon burns George's hat in the fire pit and vows to return to "finish the job".
| 202 | 4 | "Episode 4" | Days 8–9 | 5 February 2023 |
At the Villains camp, George searches for his missing hat, while Simon feigns ignorance to its whereabouts. Jordie wonders aloud if Simon's idol is real as it didn't come with a necklace or note, but Simon is sure it's real. At the Heroes camp, Gerry is dealing with an injured foot and tries to remain useful around camp as Hayley and Sharni tend to him. Sharni comments on Rogue rubbing people the wrong way, disrupting the unity of the tribe with snide comments and complaints. Flick and Hayley slip away to search for an idol, but find nothing. Flick expresses interest in working with Hayley short-term, but may seek revenge for Hayley voting her out in a previous season.: Reward challenge: Three members of each tribe race out to the water to retrieve a football, then pass it to a fourth member who tries to kick it into a goal. First tribe to score two goals wins a pizza party.; Heroes win reward. Back at the Heroes camp, the tribe discovers that the pizzas are frozen but opt to eat them as-is. Sam and David find an immunity idol clue inside one of the pizza boxes, which they share with Shaun. Hayley later talks to Shaun about possibly throwing the upcoming immunity challenge to eliminate Rogue, but Shaun secretly considers blindsiding Hayley instead as the more dangerous player.: Immunity challenge: Players hang suspended over water beneath a log for as long as possible. Last tribe with two members still on the log wins immunity.; Villains win immunity after Hayley throws the challenge. Back at the Heroes camp, Hayley discusses her risky decision but hopes that Rogue will be the easy vote tonight. She talks to the boys about splitting the votes onto Gerry to make sure she isn't the backup target. However, Shaun knows that Hayley threw the challenge and is wary of how dangerous she can be. He discusses this with Flick, who is open to a blindside, and they begin spreading the word through the tribe. The boys search for the idol to make sure Hayley doesn't find it first, and Shaun finds it hidden in a tree. At Tribal Council, Hayley discusses how well the tribe has gotten to know each other and hopes that means they'll make a good decision tonight. Flick feels like the real game has yet to begun and thinks that a line will be drawn in the sand tonight. Rogue doesn't believe that everyone on the tribe lives up to the title of a "hero" and calls out Paige on her own merits, to which Paige questions whether Rogue herself is a hero. Rogue – disappointed with being on a tribe of Trophy Hunters and those who wish to hunt – asks to be voted out. When the votes are read, Gerry and Paige each receive votes, but Rogue becomes the fourth person voted out of the game.
| 203 | 5 | "Episode 5" | Days 10–12 | 6 February 2023 |
At the Villains camp, Jordie bonds with Fraser on the beach and reconsiders his close alliance with Simon, who is viewed as bossy around camp. He is concerned about how tight George is with the girls and considers forming a side alliance with him for additional protection. At the Heroes camp, the tribe is in high spirits after removing Rogue and restoring team unity. Benjamin decides to gather supplies to build a fake idol as a team-building exercise, but it makes other tribe members nervous about his motives. Shaun encourages his allies to keep looking for the hidden idol, though he's already found it and doesn't want to tell anybody.: Reward challenge: Two members of each tribe face off throwing coconuts at a series of barrels, attempting to knock down more than the opposing pair. First tribe to win three rounds wins an assortment of baked pastries and cakes.; Heroes win reward. Back at camp, the Heroes find a scroll stating that the person who reads the scroll must decide who gets which item. Sam assigns everyone to their item, but Shaun believes he made poor decisions by giving his allies the best items and the outsiders the worst. Shaun also sees Hayley snooping for an idol and informs his allies to keep her threat level high.: Immunity challenge: Tribes push a heavy cart through a course, collecting logs and coconut husk along the way. They must then construct a fire high enough to burn through a rope hung overhead. First tribe to burn through their rope wins immunity.; Villains win immunity. Back at the Heroes camp, the tribe weighs getting rid of Gerry, whose ankle is still injured. However, Sharni and Nina pitch a Benjamin blindside to the other girls for his shady behavior. Meanwhile, the guys want to blindside Hayley, but Shaun starts to get cold feet, believing Hayley is a good shield for him. He and Flick start lobbying to save her, but Sam sees through their pitch as a self-serving game move and considers going through with his original plan anyway. At Tribal Council, Flick believes tonight's vote will be difficult because everyone gets along so well. Hayley says that she still doesn't know where everyone's loyalties lie within the big group. Gerry knows he has a target on his back due to his injury and is concerned about receiving votes tonight. Before the vote, Jonathan informs the tribe that they will not be voting to send somebody home, but rather to send them to the Villains tribe; they will then return to the Heroes tribe if they survive the next two days. The tribe begins whispering amongst themselves to discuss a plan. Paige volunteers to go, promising to bring back information if she survives, but Sam suggests that they should send someone the tribe is willing to lose. When the votes are read, Paige and Ben each receive votes, but Gerry is sent to join the Villains tribe.
| 204 | 6 | "Episode 6" | Days 13–14 | 7 February 2023 |
Gerry arrives at the Villains camp and informs them he is joining their tribe. Simon welcomes him in and plans to recruit him as an ally, but George is wary of his presence, recognizing exactly what Simon is doing. Gerry is frustrated about his old tribe turning on him and hopes to prove them wrong about his value as a player. At the Heroes camp, Sharni is upset about Gerry's departure and believes the boys are not as loyal to her as she thought.: Reward challenge: One member of each tribe squares off in a ring holding a small statue on a pole, attempting to knock the other player's statue to the ground. First tribe to win three rounds wins comfort items including pillows, blankets, a tarp, and baked lasagna.; Heroes win reward, and they enjoy lasagna and photos from their loved ones back home. At the Villains camp, George pulls Gerry aside and tells him that Hayley whispered to him at the challenge that he should work with Gerry. They fill each other in on where they sit on their respective tribes and resolve to keep each other safe.: Immunity challenge: Both tribes race into the water to a boat and paddle it to shore. They must then tie the paddles together to knock down a suspended key, use it to unlock puzzle pieces, then solve a word puzzle. First tribe to complete their puzzle wins immunity.; Heroes win immunity after Benjamin and Paige use sign language to secretly solve the word puzzle. Back at the Villains camp, Simon plans to target George and brings in Sarah as a number to blindside him. George recognises what is happening and talks to Shonee and Liz about targeting Simon, but the girls don't believe they have Sarah on their side anymore; they then discuss targeting her instead as a dangerous social player. George brings Gerry in on the plan and attempts to convince Stevie to join him. Simon starts to become nervous that he can't trust Sarah and won't have the numbers to get George out. At Tribal Council, Gerry believes he's fitting in well with his new tribe, and the others agree that he has become part of the group. George discusses the important of working with people you can trust deep into the game. Jordie believes that a tribe swap is coming, though Jonathan reminds him that it is not guaranteed. When the votes are read, the tribe unanimously turns on Sarah, and she becomes the fifth person voted out of the game.
| 205 | 7 | "Episode 7" | Day 15 | 12 February 2023 |
At the Heroes camp, Sharni expresses concern about Gerry's safety in the game whether or not he survives Tribal Council. At the Villains camp, Gerry feels good about his position in between the two primary alliances led by George and Simon respectively. George wants to go after Simon next and talks to Jordie about possibly flipping sides. When the tribes arrive at the next challenge, Jonathan informs the Villains about Gerry's situation after surviving the past two days. He gives Gerry the chance to rejoin his old tribe or stay with the Villains; Gerry elects to rejoin the Heroes tribe.: Immunity challenge: Three members of each tribe attempt to push a heavy ball through water into the enemy goal before the other tribe does the same. First tribe to score two goals wins immunity.; Heroes win immunity. Simon wants to keep it simple and target George with the four-person majority. He crafts a plan with Stevie to pretend to be a swing vote working with George's alliance, with Stevie pretending to target Simon. However, Jordie is considering flipping on Simon, and discusses options with Fraser. He tells George about Simon's "idol" and plans to leave Simon and Stevie in the dark about the new plan. At Tribal Council, George laments Gerry's decision to return to the Heroes and stresses the importance of cutting their "weakest" members. Simon insinuates that George is their weakest member, leading to an argument between the two, which makes other tribe members uncomfortable. Stevie believes that the tension between Simon and George will come to a head tonight. Before the vote, Jonathan informs the tribe that they will now be competing in an individual immunity challenge, and leads them out of the area.: Individual immunity challenge: Players fashion a pole out of sticks and twine to retrieve a flint, then use the flint to make a fire. First player to make a fire high enough to burn through a rope wins immunity.; Simon wins immunity, and the tribe returns to Tribal Council. Everyone immediately breaks off into groups to discuss a new plan; George instructs Shonee and Liz to pretend like he is going home. Simon expresses relief that he won immunity, while George admits out loud that Simon told him to target Stevie. Stevie is annoyed about Simon throwing his name around, but Simon reassures him he was never the true target. Jordie chastises Simon and George for their petty bickering and asks them to stop their personal attacks. Before the votes are read, George plays his idol for himself and informs Simon about Jordie's betrayal. He tells Simon to use his own idol to save Stevie so they can vote out Jordie and work together moving forward. Simon is torn about the situation, but ultimately apologises to Stevie and chooses not to play his idol. Two votes against George are negated and Stevie receives two, while Fraser is sent home with three votes, becoming the sixth person voted out of the game.
| 206 | 8 | "Episode 8" | Days 16–17 | 13 February 2023 |
At the Villains camp, Stevie thanks Shonee and Liz for choosing to save him. Simon confronts Jordie about his betrayal, and Jordie expresses frustration about the position George put them both in. Shonee and Liz both want to protect Jordie, and the three of them vow to work together moving forward. Shonee finds an immunity idol hidden near the water well and decides not to tell anybody about it. At the Heroes camp, Gerry reflects on his decision to leave the Villains despite being an outsider again. The tribe questions whether Gerry is still loyal to them, especially after he criticises them for voting him out and calls out the hierarchy in place. Benjamin privately agrees with Gerry's assessment of the tribe and worries that he is at the bottom. He finds an identical object to the one Simon found at the Villains camp and wonders if it could be an immunity idol.: Immunity challenge: In pairs, tribes hold up a set of blocks using only their feet. Last tribe with a block remaining upright wins immunity.; Villains win immunity after Paige and Sharni drop the last Heroes box. Back at the Heroes camp, the athletic guys plan to vote for Benjamin again and split the vote onto Gerry in case of an idol play. Benjamin locates the actual immunity idol by the well, but Matt witnesses him reading the note, solidifying the plan to target him and flush the idol. Sharni learns of the split vote plan and doesn't want Gerry to go. Meanwhile, Paige continues throwing Sharni under the bus for their failure to win the challenge, which Benjamin considers using as ammo later. At Tribal Council, Paige denies that she was responsible for dropping the box in the challenge, but declines to blame Sharni publicly. Benjamin informs the other girls that he believes Sharni threw the challenge and suggests targeting her rather than Gerry. Sharni is upset with Gerry being targeted and espouses the importance of loyalty, but Benjamin says loyalty has to be earned. Before the votes are read, Benjamin plays his idol for himself, negating six votes against him. Sharni receives the remaining votes, becoming the seventh person voted out of the game.
| 207 | 9 | "Episode 9" | Days 18–19 | 14 February 2023 |
Both tribes arrive for what they assume is an auction, but Jonathan instructs them to drop their buffs and randomly select buffs for their new tribes. The athletic men all end up on the new Villains tribe, while George and Shonee are on the new Heroes tribe separated from Liz. The new tribes then participate in the auction.: Survivor Auction: Players bid individually on items ranging from food and luxuries to game advantages. Money is shared among tribes, but items cannot be shared.; George wins an afternoon retreat away from camp, and picks Shonee and Liz to join him. At the retreat, the three feast on food, George learns he won $60,000, and Shonee finds a second immunity idol that George and Liz agree to keep secret. At the new Heroes camp, Paige is concerned about Benjamin and plans to work with George short-term to get him out. At the new Villains camp, Simon is thrilled about how stacked his new tribe is and bonds with Shaun and the other boys. Jordie is worried about still being with Simon and believes he is at the bottom of the boys’ hierarchy, but works to blend in with the others. Shaun hopes to stay Heroes strong, and he and Hayley discuss flushing Simon's idol (which George publicly informed everyone about).: Immunity challenge: One member of each tribe is locked in a cage, while the rest of the tribe navigates them through an obstacle course. Two members then work together to solve a block puzzle. First tribe to complete their puzzle wins immunity.; Villains win immunity. At the Heroes camp, the former Heroes want to get Benjamin out, but George would rather save him and target another original Hero like Paige. He brings Gerry and Stevie in on the plan and leaves the other former Heroes in the dark. Paige reconsiders her plan and wants to get George out while they have the chance, but worries about Gerry's true loyalties. Benjamin pitches Gerry on staying Hero strong to carry favour with the other tribe, but Gerry is still on the fence about who he wants to work with. Shonee is suspicious of late conversations happening around camp and considers using an idol tonight. At Tribal Council, George believes tonight's vote will determine if old tribal lines are still intact. Shonee hopes that new bonds and conversations will be enough to ensure that the minority former Villains aren't picked off one by one. Gerry espouses his loyalty but questions whether others have earned his trust after being voted out by the former Heroes. Shonee notices the former Heroes whispering to each other and expresses uncertainty about what will happen tonight. Before the votes are read, Shonee plays her idol for George, negating four votes against him. Paige receives the remaining four votes, becoming the eighth person voted out of the game.
| 208 | 10 | "Episode 10" | Days 20–21 | 19 February 2023 |
At the Heroes camp, Shonee and George both feel great about their new position of power on the tribe after Paige's departure. They entertain conversations with Benjamin, Flick and Matt, all of whom bargain for their safety. At the Villains camp, Liz feels exposed without Shonee by her side, viewing her as a sister, and feels at the bottom of her new tribe. She discusses strategy with Simon and Jordie, and Simon promises to use his idol to save any of the three of them, but Liz doesn't fully believe him.: Reward challenge: Four members of each tribe are tethered together carrying sandbags, racing around a water course to catch the other tribe. First tribe to win three rounds wins a breakfast feast.; Villains win reward. During the challenge, Liz informs Shonee that she's in trouble on her new tribe, and Shonee considers giving her idol to Liz. Back at the Villains camp, Liz sneaks off during the food reward to search for an idol and finds one. She tells Jordie about her find, and they plan to ask Shonee for her idol at the next challenge to ensure they are both safe. Meanwhile, Shaun and Sam scheme to pressure Simon into giving up his "idol" in exchange for his safety in the game. Simon is thrilled about the opportunity and agrees to give it to Shaun, but proposes that Shaun passes it on to Flick so she can use it to blindside George.: Immunity challenge: Both tribes race through an obstacle course. One member of each tribe then chops a log to release a bag full of coconuts, which another member fires from a slingshot at a series of targets. First tribe to hit all their targets wins immunity.; Heroes win immunity. After the challenge, tribes secretly exchange information as Shaun gives his "idol" to Flick and Shonee gives her idol to Jordie. Back at the Heroes camp, Hayley proposes splitting the vote onto Liz and Jordie and eliminating Jordie on the re-vote. However, Liz and Jordie show their idols to Nina and Hayley and pressure them to flip and target Sam. Hayley tells Shaun and David everything, and they begin to reconsider their plan. David proposes voting for Simon to be safe, but Shaun doesn't want to go back on his word. Simon learns about the idols and panics, deciding to rejoin Liz and Jordie for the vote. At Tribal Council, Shaun is happy with the strength of the tribe and how well everyone gets along. Jordie is worried about old tribal lines dictating alliances. Sam agrees that the old Heroes are tight-knit and espouses his loyalty to them. Sam begins to suspect that something is up and learns from Nina about the idols, which leads to many whispered conversations. Shaun proposes a new split vote between Jordie and Sam to be safe. Jordie and Liz decline to play their idols, and Sam and Jordie each receive four votes. On the re-vote, everyone but Liz votes for Jordie, making him the ninth person voted out of the game.
| 209 | 11 | "Episode 11" | Day 22 | 20 February 2023 |
At the Heroes camp, Flick and Matt approach Stevie about whether he would be open to working with them against George. They show him the "destiny" symbol that Simon told them about at the last challenge, reaffirming to Stevie that Simon is still devoted to him. Flick tells Matt about the "idol" she got from Simon, but they decide not to tell Benjamin, not quite trusting him yet. George feels threatened by Flick's social prowess and plans to throw the next challenge to vote her out. At the Villains camp, Liz considers herself a "lone wolf" after Jordie's departure, and Simon is emotional about having to vote his friend out. Sam realises that he can't trust the original Heroes alliance outside of David, and plans to be more flexible moving forward. Nina feels bad about writing Sam's name under duress and recognises that she has to stop playing so passively. Nina and Sam both talk to Liz about potentially working together to build new bonds heading into merge.: Immunity challenge: Both tribes transport giant blocks through an obstacle course, then use them to assemble a staircase puzzle. First tribe to solve the puzzle and climb the staircase wins immunity.; Villains win immunity after George and Shonee successfully throw the challenge. During the challenge, Liz informs George that Simon's "idol" was passed over to Flick, and Simon continues to flash the "destiny" symbol to Stevie. Back at the Heroes camp, George wants his alliance to put four votes on one of the three former Heroes, and Gerry suggests targeting Benjamin in case Flick plays her "idol". Stevie is discouraged from talking to the minority alliance, but he recognises that he is the swing vote and bounces between the two groups, making both sides nervous. George and Flick discuss a possible alliance moving forward, and George plans to issue her an ultimatum at Tribal Council to test her loyalty. At Tribal Council, George is disappointed by Jordie's departure and considers it a declaration of war. Flick discusses how much information is swapped between the two tribes at challenges and how much their respective votes affect one another's strategy. Stevie wants to play things safe so close to the merge and not shake up the game too much. Flick confirms that she was given an "idol" from the other side, which George says should be cause for concern for everybody. George suggests that Flick should throw it in the fire to build trust with the majority, but she declines. Before the votes are read, Flick plays her "idol" for Matt, but Jonathan informs her that it is not a real idol. Stevie stays true to the majority, and Benjamin becomes the tenth person voted out of the game.
| 210 | 12 | "Episode 12" | Days 23–25 | 21 February 2023 |
At the Heroes camp, Flick is furious with Simon for giving her a fake idol, believing he intentionally lied to the old Heroes to further his game. George is thinking ahead to the merge and decides to bring in Matt as a potential source of information against the alpha males, but Matt is hesitant to trust the old Villains. At the Villains camp, Simon feels great about his new alliance after giving up his idol for safety. Liz also feels more secure with her new bond with David, Nina and Sam, and she doesn't trust Simon at all. She publicly confronts him for his repeated lies and challenges him to reveal his idol, but he declines. Liz and David discuss going after Simon or Hayley at the next vote. When the tribes come together for the next challenge, Flick publicly calls out Simon for attempting to pass off his fake idol as real, shocking everyone on the other tribe, including Simon.: Reward challenge: One member of each tribe races up a net wall to retrieve a ring, then attempts to shoot the ring onto a high hook. First tribe to win three rounds wins a Chinese banquet.; Villains win reward. During the challenge, Flick suggests to Sam that the Villains should throw the next immunity challenge to get rid of Simon. Back at camp, the Villains confront Simon during the feast, and he swears that he didn't know his idol was fake. Shaun considers his previous promise of safety to Simon nullified because his idol wasn't real, and he contemplates throwing the next challenge.: Immunity challenge: One member of each tribe races out to a station to memorise a sequence of symbols, then returns to their own station to recreate the sequence. First tribe to win three rounds wins immunity.; Heroes win immunity after Shaun, Hayley and Nina throw the challenge. Back at the Villains camp, Hayley discusses the risk involved with throwing challenges, but is confident that Simon is going home. The tribe contemplates a split vote between Simon and Liz, but worries about Simon playing a real idol and decides to tell Simon to vote for Sam. Sam starts to get paranoid and scrambles to make sure his name isn't being discussed, and Nina comes clean that he was the decoy vote. Sam and Nina realise how good Shaun and Hayley are at lying and consider flipping the vote onto Hayley. At Tribal Council, Simon asks Jonathan what he found in the cookie jar, and Jonathan confirms that it was simply a clue to the real idol. Liz discusses her struggle to break into the tight-knit old Heroes tribe, and Simon echoes her sentiment, calling himself a "gun-for-hire". Sam says he felt awful about receiving votes last time and is worried about receiving more tonight. Before the vote, Jonathan informs the tribe that tonight will work differently, and invites the Heroes tribe into Tribal Council as spectators. He gives the Villains a chance to mutiny by writing their own name down to join the Heroes tribe; if multiple or no people write their names down, rocks will be drawn to determine who switches tribes. When the votes are read, Liz elects to mutiny, and she joins the Heroes tribe.
| 211 | 13 | "Episode 13" | Days 26–27 | 26 February 2023 |
At the Heroes camp, Shonee and George are thrilled to be reunited with Liz. Liz informs them about the failed plan to blindside Hayley, which alarms George, who wants to work with Hayley at the merge. Flick believes she is in a precarious position on the tribe and hopes to win over Shonee and Liz as potential allies. George does not trust Flick and worries that the girls are being deceived by her strong social game. He conspires with the other boys to blindside Flick.: Reward challenge: Both tribes pull a heavy cart through an obstacle course while collecting balls along the way. One member of each tribe then attempts to shoot their balls into a basket. First tribe to score all nine balls wins a trip to a deli sandwich bar.; Villains win reward. After the challenge, George secretly informs Hayley that Nina was going to betray her at the last vote. Nina notices them whispering and worries that he may have ratted her out. The Villains arrive at the sandwich reward, only to learn that they have to enter one at a time and determine their order ahead of time. They elect to draw sticks to decide on the order; multiple people search the area for idols, but nobody finds anything. Back at the Heroes camp, Matt realises that Flick is growing close to the girls, making him question his prior loyalties. He pulls George aside and proposes a formal alliance, offering to act as a mole for the other side, which George is thrilled to hear.: Immunity challenge: Tribe members hold up a sandbag for as long as possible. If they grow tired, they may pass their sandbag(s) to another tribe member and drop out. Meanwhile, one member of each tribe races to solve a puzzle; the first to solve it can choose one member of the opposing tribe to drop out. Last tribe to keep all of their sandbags upright wins immunity.; Villains win immunity after Nina solves the puzzle and knocks out Matt. Back at the Heroes camp, George continues to target Flick, but Shonee and Liz want to work with her and attempt to convince George to target Matt instead. George refuses to budge, annoying the girls with his domineering attitude. George recognises that he risks losing the girls’ trust by overriding their wishes, but still believes Flick is the right move. At Tribal Council, Liz feels more in control on her new tribe and isn't worried about tonight's vote. Flick feels the opposite, recognizing that she and Matt are on the bottom. Flick and Matt both pitch the majority alliance as to why they should choose to keep them. Shonee whispers to George that Liz will give Flick her idol if he doesn't switch his vote. George reconsiders, and proposes voting out Stevie as a compromise, to which the girls agree. When the votes are read, Flick and Matt target each other, but Stevie becomes the eleventh person voted out of the game.
| 212 | 14 | "Episode 14" | Days 28–29 | 27 February 2023 |
At the Heroes camp, Shonee feels bad about sending Stevie home but is happy to still have Flick around. Gerry worries that the boys burned themselves by not sending Flick home, but trusts George as a strategist and remains loyal to him and Matt. Gerry and Matt cement a final two deal and plan to use George as a means to get there. Both tribes arrive for a feast, and learn that the tribes have merged. George hopes to bring in Hayley as a number, but worries that Flick has switched back to the other side. Shonee and Liz also share this concern after Flick lies to them about a late-night conversation between all the former Heroes. George suggests bringing in Simon as a number since nobody else wants to work with him. He pitches a new majority alliance to Simon and Hayley, which they both strongly consider.: Immunity challenge: Players float in the ocean beneath a narrow grate as the tide slowly rises, giving them progressively less breathing space. Last player remaining beneath their grate wins immunity.; Matt wins immunity. The old Heroes decide to target Shonee, while the old Villains plan to target Sam. David informs Liz that her name has come up, but Shonee thinks that he may be lying to make her paranoid to waste her idol. George talks to Shaun about possibly flipping against Sam, but Shaun doesn't trust him and informs Sam right away. Shonee and Liz are furious with George for spilling the plan and they scramble to change the vote to David. Matt and Simon both start to get cold feet due to George's erratic play. At Tribal Council, Hayley says that the first merge vote is the most important due to unclear loyalties. George agrees, saying that tonight's decisions will determine who gets to the end of the game. Matt is grateful to have the immunity necklace to ensure he has some power in tonight's vote. Liz and Shonee both worry about their safety tonight. Before the votes are read, Liz plays her idol for Shonee, despite David trying to convince her not to. Four votes against Shonee are negated, and Liz receives a vote, but David receives all the rest, becoming the twelfth person voted out of the game.
| 213 | 15 | "Episode 15" | Days 30–31 | 28 February 2023 |
After tribal council, the new majority alliance celebrates the successful vote. Matt suggests naming the alliance “Vigilantes”, a reference to Nina's failed attempt to name the merge tribe. Shonee is perplexed why Flick turned on her after she previously saved her, and she plans to target Flick next for revenge. Nina, Sam and Shaun discuss their dire situation and consider trying to bring Simon back into the fold. Simon is still surprised that he has found himself working with George and leaves himself open to blindsiding him in the future.: Immunity challenge: Players hold onto a rope attached to a weighted barrel. Last person to drop their barrel wins immunity.; Liz wins immunity. The Vigilantes discuss voting out Flick, while the minority players attempt unsuccessfully to find a crack in the majority alliance. Flick pitches to Simon that he risks losing the chance to get rid of George if he waits too long, while Shaun appeals to Hayley that he previously kept her safe and hopes she'll do the same for him. Shaun has an idol that nobody knows about and considers using it if the moment is right. At Tribal Council, Sam believes that the previous vote didn't change much in the pecking order, while George disagrees, saying the ship has sailed to get on the winning side. Simon and George reflect on their contentious relationship early in the game and how they've buried the hatchet. Flick explains her difficult decision at the previous vote, while Shonee says she made a mistake with the side she chose. Matt believes he was in the same position as Flick, but managed to make the right decision. When the votes are read, the minority alliance votes for Matt in an attempt to scare him, but Flick becomes the thirteenth player voted out and the first member of the jury.
| 214 | 16 | "Episode 16" | Days 32–33 | 5 March 2023 |
The remaining ten players arrive for a reward challenge.: Reward challenge: In pairs, players hold onto a pole for as long as they can. At intervals, they must move down the pole to progressively smaller footholds. If either player drops, both players on the pole are out. Last pair remaining wins a KFC food reward.; Hayley and George win reward. They are allowed to invite another pair on reward with them; they choose Shonee and Gerry. Back at camp, Shaun talks to Simon, Nina and Sam about potentially blindsiding George, and reveals that he has an idol he can use for this purpose; Simon strongly considers it. George shares secrets with Hayley in an attempt to solidify a final 3 deal with her, but she recognises that he would likely beat her. She talks to Sam about potentially working with him again, and they agree that George has played the best game so far.: Immunity challenge: Players transport letter blocks one at a time from their station to a wobbly frame, which they must balance with a rope. First players to spell “HEROES VS VILLAINS” on their frame without knocking any blocks over wins immunity.; Simon wins immunity. George notices that Simon celebrates his win with Shaun and Sam, making him suspicious of his true loyalties. George suggests a split vote between Nina and Shaun with Simon present, but he later pulls the rest of the alliance aside to secretly switch the target onto Sam. Hayley tips off Nina that Sam is the target and urges the minority alliance to use an idol on him; Nina shares this with Sam and Shaun, but they aren't sure if they can trust her. The three of them search for an idol, and Nina finds one; they debate whether to play both of their idols and on whom. At Tribal Council, Shonee feels good about the majority alliance and isn't worried about anyone flipping. George agrees, stressing that anyone breaking away now would be sabotaging their own game. Hayley discusses the delicate balance of staying under the radar but still impressing the jury. Sam explains the difficulty of playing an idol correctly in a minority position. Before the votes are read, Nina and Shaun play their idols for themselves, despite Sam urging Shaun to use it on him. Neither idol is successful, as Sam becomes the second member of the jury.
| 215 | 17 | "Episode 17" | Days 34–35 | 6 March 2023 |
George feels burned by Simon's betrayal and rallies everybody to vote him out next. Shaun and Nina are frustrated by their idol misplays the night before and decide to throw Simon under the bus to survive another day. Shonee argues that Shaun and Nina are bigger jury threats and would prefer to target them first. She and Liz worry about the jury perception that George is controlling them and vow to protect one another; Shonee also finds a hidden immunity idol. George overhears the two girls discussing their alliance and realises he is a third wheel in the Spice Girls.: Immunity challenge: Players attempt to land three sandbags on a hanging disc. The first six to do so move on to phase two, where they throw sandbags to knock rungs out of a ladder, then use said rungs to build a bridge across an expanse. First three to cross the bridge move onto phase three, where they are tethered to a station attempting to stack disks on a spinning table. First player to stack all their disks wins immunity.; Simon beats Shaun and Hayley to win his second straight immunity. The majority plan to split their votes between Shaun and Nina in case of an idol. George urges Simon to vote for Shaun, or else he'll be voted out the next time he's vulnerable. However, George grows paranoid of Shonee and Liz's bond and considers taking a shot at Shonee instead. Hayley is concerned that it would turn Liz against them, but agrees to the plan, bringing in Gerry, Matt and Nina to join them. Shonee begins to sense that something has gone awry and fears that the split vote will fail. At Tribal Council, Simon knows he would have been gone without the immunity necklace, and believes Shaun or Nina will go home tonight. George hopes that the “deal” he made earlier will be upheld, and Matt and Shonee agree that George's deal are usually beneficial. The tribe debates when the right time to make a move is, and Nina implores the majority to make a move tonight. When the votes are read, Shonee declines to play her idol, and she is blindsided, becoming the third member of the jury.
| 216 | 18 | "Episode 18" | Days 36–37 | 7 March 2023 |
Back at camp, George explains his reasoning to Liz for betraying Shonee and vows his loyalty moving forward. He assumes that she will understand and forgive him, but Liz is secretly devastated and vows revenge against George. Gerry and George agree that getting rid of Simon and Shaun should be their next priority. Simon offers a top 2 deal with George, but George believes their previous deal is over and wants him out next.: Reward challenge: Using only their feet, players unwind a rope to release puzzle blocks, then assemble the blocks into a tower. First to assemble their tower wins a picnic lunch and their choice between two brand-new Isuzu cars.; Simon wins reward, and chooses Matt, Hayley and Nina to join him on the picnic. During reward, the group discusses strategy and considers George to be the biggest threat in the game. Hayley shares the fact that George won $60,000 at the auction in the hopes of poisoning others against him to get rid of him sooner rather than later.: Immunity challenge: Players squat against a wooden frame balancing a small statue. Last player with their statue still upright wins immunity.; Nina wins immunity. Back at camp, George rallies votes against Simon, and Hayley proposes a split vote between him and Shaun. George shares this plan with Shaun but assures him he will be safe, making him nervous. Simon feels paranoid about being left out of conversations and scrambles to form a new plan with Shaun, suggesting they target Matt instead. At Tribal Council, George discusses the Shonee vote as a reminder that anything can happen in the game. Liz describes being blindsided by the vote but believes it's important to forgive and move on. Simon portrays George, Matt and Gerry as the new “power trio” of the tribe that everyone should be worried about. George believes it's worse to fail at a plan than to do nothing at all, but Simon disagrees, stressing the importance of attempting moves. When the votes are read, Simon and Shaun split the votes, but Hayley flips her vote to make Shaun the fourth member of the jury. As they exit Tribal, George believes Nina is the one who flipped and plans to target her next.
| 217 | 19 | "Episode 19" | Days 38–39 | 12 March 2023 |
Back at camp, George publicly confronts Nina about flipping her vote, which she denies. She privately informs George that Hayley told her about his $60,000 reward win, making him realise that she's telling the truth and that Hayley betrayed him. He informs Liz of this and they plan to blindside her next, despite George's previous desire to get to the end with her.: Reward challenge: Players balance on a narrow beam, using a pole to stack blocks on a wobbly platform. First player to stack eight blocks without them falling wins a night away at the Survivor spa.; Liz wins reward, and elects to bring George and Nina with her. They strike a top 3 deal, planning to pretend like George and Nina were fighting constantly throughout the reward but still secretly targeting Hayley. Back at camp, Hayley and Simon confront Matt and Gerry about targeting George, but they don't believe it's the right time yet. Late that night, a frustrated Simon dumps out half of the tribe's rice, hoping to weaken them and boost his chances in the next immunity challenge.: Immunity challenge: Players build a fire on one side of a pendulum, then fill a leaky bucket of water on the other side to raise the fire up to an elevated flag. First player to burn through their flag wins immunity.; Simon wins immunity. Back at camp, George concocts a plan to split the vote between Nina and Liz, but secretly intends to vote out Hayley. He talks to Hayley and lies that Nina admitted to flipping her vote and that he wants her out. Meanwhile, Simon hatches a plan to target George, bringing in Hayley and Nina for the plan. Nina is torn between helping George or Hayley and deliberates which one will be more helpful for her game. At Tribal Council, Liz discusses how refreshing the Survivor spa was and why she chose George and Nina to join her, lying that she wanted to prevent Nina from searching for idols. Nina says that she failed to ingratiate herself with George at the spa, and George confirms that the person who flipped their vote will be "punished" tonight. Simon seemingly confirms this by saying he feels bad that he can't share the immunity necklace with Nina. Hayley says that the most important thing at this stage of the game is finding the people you want to get to the end with, and George agrees. When the votes are read, George, Nina and Liz each receive a vote, but Hayley is blindsided, becoming the fifth member of the jury.
| 218 | 20 | "Episode 20" | Days 40–41 | 13 March 2023 |
George discusses his two separate top 3 deals with Matt and Gerry vs. Liz and Nina, and feels good about his position in the game. Simon offers himself as a number to anyone who wants to make a move, and believes his lack of strategy so far could end up helping him get to the end. He tells Matt, Liz and Nina that the jury views him as George's pawns and won't respect them at the end, but they disagree. However, Matt privately worries that his resume isn't strong enough and considers making a move against George, discussing the option with Simon and Nina.: Immunity challenge: Players balance with their feet on narrow pegs and one hand on a raised idol, trying not to fall. Last player standing wins immunity.; Matt wins immunity. George wants to vote out Simon, with Nina as a split vote backup plan. However, he tells Nina to put one vote on Gerry as protection for himself. Matt tells Simon that he wants George out, but Simon worries that it's a decoy plan; he and Nina agree that Matt isn't trustworthy. George worries about the possibility of one person flipping their vote to ruin the split vote plan. At Tribal Council, Simon believes there is a high chance he goes home since he lost immunity. Nina admits that she doesn't know if she has a clear path to the end. She whispers with Simon and Matt, causing George to worry that Matt has flipped; he secretly switches the vote onto Nina to be safe. Before the votes are read, Jonathan informs the players that nobody will be going home; instead, the two highest vote earners will be sent into "Survivor isolation" with no food, water or social contact until the next tribal council, unless the tribe decides to provide it to them. Nina earns everyone else's vote, and her lone vote for Gerry means he will join her in isolation.
| 219 | 21 | "Episode 21" | Day 42 | 19 March 2023 |
Gerry and Nina arrive at Survivor isolation and express surprise about the outcome of the vote. Nina informs Gerry about her “Jacuzzi alliance” with George and Liz, making him realise that his own top 3 deal with George might not be legitimate. In the morning, George brings Gerry his favourite chair along with breakfast, but Gerry admits that he's lost trust in George. He and Nina later discuss voting out George next, planning to recruit Matt and Simon for the task, respectively.: Immunity challenge: Players stack blocks on a rotating circular platform, attempting to create and trigger a domino chain that traverses the full length of the platform. First player to do so successfully wins immunity.; Matt wins immunity. George suggests a repeat of last night's strategy, targeting Simon with Nina as a backup split vote. George and Matt share this plan with Gerry as Nina listens; once they leave, Nina criticises their attempt to make amends. Simon later approaches them to gauge their interest in blindsiding George, which they agree with. Gerry later discusses this option with Matt, and they consider which side to vote with. At Tribal Council, Gerry discusses bonding with Nina over the past 24 hours, and his frayed trust from the previous vote. George discusses his “panic” at the last tribal council and apologises to Gerry, hoping to rebuild trust tonight. Simon discusses why he called several players “pawns", praising George's game and ability to manipulate others. Gerry pushes back on his logic, considering George his “mentor” and calling their relationship mutually beneficial, which brings George to tears. Simon and Nina realise that Gerry is no longer voting with them. When the votes are read, Simon and Nina split the votes evenly, and on the re-vote, Simon becomes the sixth member of the jury.
| 220 | 22 | "Episode 22" | Days 43–44 | 20 March 2023 |
The players wake up to a special breakfast of muffins, coffee and sugar, giving them all an energy boost. George reflects on his close friendship with Gerry, and they reaffirm their top 3 deal with Matt. Liz notices how close George and Gerry have become and knows they will never betray each other; she and Nina scheme to target Matt next. Liz talks to George to convince him that Matt is too big of a challenge threat to keep around.: Immunity challenge: Players drop a ball into an overhead chute and attempt to catch it on a disk. They must then traverse an obstacle course while balancing the ball on the disk, collecting additional balls along the way. They must then navigate all three balls through a vertical maze; first to do so wins immunity.; Liz wins immunity. Nina knows she is in danger tonight but hopes that she can persuade Liz and George to vote out Matt. However, George is concerned that Nina is a bigger jury threat and is therefore more dangerous. Liz berates George for allowing Gerry to tug at his heartstrings and urges him to be more cutthroat. George knows that Matt is more loyal to Gerry and believes he may stand a better chance of winning by cutting him. At Tribal Council, Nina expresses frustration at being on the bottom for most of the merge. Liz compliments Nina's tenacity in staying alive. George expresses the importance of having an ally like Matt who can bring him to final 2, while Liz singles out Matt as her biggest challenge competition. George believes he has a clear path to the end, and credits himself for putting together the winning alliance. Nina expresses her desire as a potential juror to vote for a winner who had an active role in getting to the end, which she immediately regrets saying. When the votes are read, George decides to side with Matt and Gerry and vote out Nina, making her the seventh member of the jury.
| 221 | 23 | "Episode 23" | Day 45 | 26 March 2023 |
Liz is upset with George for putting her in a terrible position, but George insists that her game is not over yet. Liz doesn't believe him and knows that she has to win the next immunity challenge to survive. George reflects on his decision to vote out Nina as a big jury threat, and believes he will have the jury's vote if he reaches the end. Gerry feels great about his alliance with George and Matt and hopes to stay loyal to them until the very end.: Reward challenge: Players swim to shore from a platform, collecting balls along the way. They must then throw the balls into an overhead chute, crawl under a net, solve a block puzzle, climb a deck, then land sandbags on a series of perches. First player to finish wins an extra vote at tonight's tribal council.; Matt wins the extra vote. After the challenge, Jonathan reveals that tonight's vote will not send somebody home; instead, the players will vote to remove a juror from the game. George and Liz conspire to convince Matt and Gerry to vote out Simon, believing that he will vote for one of the former Heroes. However, Matt recognises George's manipulation and would rather vote out Shonee, who would definitely not vote for either of them. Gerry is less sure, weighing the merits of both sides. At Tribal Council, Jonathan fills in the jury on what is happening tonight. George stresses the importance of tonight's vote with such a narrow margin needed to win the jury vote. Matt discusses the power his extra vote gives him, as he only needs one other person to join him for a majority. George whispers to Gerry to stick with the Simon plan, but Gerry disagrees, wanting to break up the female jurors that he worries will vote for Liz. When the votes are read, Gerry and George both join Matt in voting for Shonee, removing her from the jury.
| 222 | 24 | "Episode 24" | Days 46–47 | 27 March 2023 |
The players reflect on their journeys in the game thus far before heading to their final immunity challenge. When they arrive, they are greeted by their loved ones who are there to cheer them on.: Immunity challenge: Players balance on a narrow perch while holding onto a bar overhead. At intervals, spikes are driven deeper into their backs, making it harder to balance. Last player standing wins final immunity.; Liz wins immunity. Gerry believes he is unworthy to make it to the end and offers himself to be voted out, and George agrees. However, Matt intends to vote for George to give himself a chance to win the game, and Liz still seeks revenge on George for voting out Shonee. Matt tells Gerry his plan, and Gerry promises to think about what he will do tonight. At Tribal Council, George praises Liz's challenge performance and her resilience in the game thus far. Liz believes that she would have gone home if she hadn't won the necklace. Gerry is conflicted on who to vote for between Matt and George, feeling loyal to both. Gerry ultimately decides to join Liz and Matt in voting for George, making him the final member of the jury. The following morning, Gerry, Liz and Matt enjoy a breakfast feast and discuss their different paths to the end, before heading to their Final Tribal Council to face the jury. Liz espouses her challenge prowess and strong social bonds, as well as taking out King George; Matt discusses his strategy of using his reputation as a “nice guy” in his favour; Gerry explains how he used George as a weapon of revenge against the OG Heroes. The jury grills them on how proactive they each were in the game outside of George's influence. Matt is criticised for his lack of independent strategy, while Gerry is criticised for failing to make personal connections with the jury. The jury votes unanimously in Liz's favour, awarding her $500,000 and the title of Sole Survivor.

== Voting history ==
Tribal Phase (Day 1–27)

| | Original Tribes | | | | | | Post-Swap Tribes | Original Tribes (Note: Jonathan informed the Heroes at Tribal Council of Day 12 that instead of voting someone out, they would vote someone to join the Villains tribe. If that person survived two days at the Villains, they would return to the Heroes. Gerry survived the Swap twist, therefore, he returned to the Heroes on day 15.) | | Switched Tribes | | | | Mutiny (Note: On Day 25, instead of voting out someone at Tribal Council, Villains was given the offer to mutiny from their tribe and become a member of Heroes. If multiple players or no players accepted the offer, rocks would be drawn to determine who would be sent to the Heroes tribe. Only Liz decided to leave Villains and she beceame a full member of Heroes.) | Post-mutiny |
| Episode # | 1 | | 2 | 3 | 4 | 5 | 6 | 7 | 8 | 9 | 10 | | 11 | 12 | 13 |
|---|---|---|---|---|---|---|---|---|---|---|---|---|---|---|---|
| Day # | 2 | | 5 | 7 | 9 | 12 | 14 | 15 | 17 | 19 | 21 | | 22 | 25 | 27 |
| Eliminated | Jackie | Anjali (Note: Due to medical intervention by production, Jackie and George did not attend Tribal Council. Before the vote was revealed, Jonathan revealed that Jackie fractured her collarbone and was deemed unable to continue with the game. With George still in an unknown medical state at this time, the remaining Villains were given the option on whether to Reveal the Vote (eliminating a tribemate), or Stop the Count (leaving the tribe intact) by unanimous decision, the Villains chose to reveal the vote.) | Michael | Mimi | Rogue | Gerry | Sarah | Fraser | Sharni | Paige | Tie (Note: The Tribal Council vote resulted in a tie. Per the rules, a second vote was held where the castaways involved in the tie would not vote and the remaining castaways could only vote for those who tied.) | Jordie | Benjamin | Liz | Stevie |
| Votes | Evacuated | 9–1 | 8–1–1 | 8–1 | 7–4–1 | 8–2–1 | 8–1 | 3–2–0 (Note: George played a hidden immunity idol on himself, therefore two votes against him were negated.) | 5–0 (Note: Benjamin played a hidden immunity idol on himself, therefore six votes against him were negated.) | 4–0 (Note: Shonee played a hidden immunity idol on George, therefore four votes against him were negated.) | 4–4 | 5–1 | 4–3 | Accepted | 4–2–1 |
| Voter | Vote | | | | | | | | | | | | | | |
| Liz | | Anjali | Michael | Mimi | | | Sarah | Fraser | | | Sam | Sam | | Mutinied | Stevie |
| Gerry | | | | | Rogue | Benjamin | Sarah | | ~~Benjamin~~ | Paige | | | Benjamin | | Stevie |
| Matt | | | | | Gerry | Gerry | | | ~~Benjamin~~ | ~~George~~ | | | Gerry | | Flick |
| George | Sick Day (Note: Due to medical intervention by production, George did not attend Tribal Council but had not been deemed unable to continue with the game. As he could not attend Tribal Council, he could not vote, nor be voted out.) | | Stevie | Mimi | | | Sarah | Fraser | | Paige | | | Benjamin | | Stevie |
| Nina | | | | | Rogue | Gerry | | | Sharni | | Sam | Jordie | | Denied | |
| Simon | | Anjali | Michael | Mimi | | | Sarah | ~~George~~ | | | Jordie | Jordie | | Denied | |
| Hayley | | | | | Rogue | Gerry | | | Sharni | | Sam | Jordie | | Denied | |
| Shaun | | | | | Gerry | Gerry | | | ~~Benjamin~~ | | Jordie | Jordie | | Denied | |
| Shonee | | Anjali | Michael | Mimi | | | Sarah | Fraser | | Paige | | | Benjamin | | Stevie |
| Sam | | | | | Gerry | Gerry | | | ~~Benjamin~~ | | Jordie | None (Note: Jordie and Sam were ineligible to vote in the revote.) | | Denied | |
| Flick | | | | | Rogue | Gerry | | | Sharni | ~~George~~ | | | Gerry | | Matt |
| David | | | | | Gerry | Gerry | | | ~~Benjamin~~ | | Jordie | Jordie | | Denied | |
| Stevie | | Anjali | Michael | Mimi | | | Sarah | ~~George~~ | | Paige | | | Benjamin | | Flick |
| Benjamin | | | | | Rogue | Paige | | | Sharni | ~~George~~ | | | Gerry | | |
| Jordie | | Anjali | Michael | Mimi | | | Sarah | Stevie | | | Sam | None | | | |
| Paige | | | | | Rogue | Gerry | | | Sharni | ~~George~~ | | | | | |
| Sharni | | | | | Rogue | Paige | | | ~~Benjamin~~ | | | | | | |
| Fraser | | Anjali | Michael | Mimi | | | Sarah | Stevie | | | | | | | |
| Sarah | | Anjali | Michael | Mimi | | | George | | | | | | | | |
| Rogue | | | | | Paige | | | | | | | | | | |
| Mimi | | Anjali | Michael | Stevie | | | | | | | | | | | |
| Michael | | Anjali | George | | | | | | | | | | | | |
| Anjali | | Stevie | | | | | | | | | | | | | |
| Jackie | | | | | | | | | | | | | | | |

Individual phase (Day 28–47)

| | Merged tribe | | | | | | | | | | | |
| Episode # | 14 | 15 | 16 | 17 | 18 | 19 | 20 | 21 | | 22 | 23 | 24 |
|---|---|---|---|---|---|---|---|---|---|---|---|---|
| Day # | 29 | 31 | 33 | 35 | 37 | 39 | 41 | 42 | | 44 | 45 | 46 |
| Eliminated | David | Flick | Sam | Shonee | Shaun | Hayley | Gerry & Nina (Note: After the votes were cast, Jonathan informed the tribe that instead of being eliminated, the two people with the most votes would spend the next 24 hours in Survivor Isolation and not be able to compete for immunity.) | Tie | Simon | Nina | Shonee (Note: On Day 45, the Final 4 had to vote for a jury member to be removed, which Matt earning an extra vote for winning the reward. The majority decided on Shonee.) | George |
| Votes | 7–1–0 (Note: Liz played a hidden immunity idol on Shonee, therefore four votes against her were negated.) | 7–3–1 | 6–4 | 5–3–1 | 4–3–1 | 4–1–1–1 | 5–1 | 3–3 | 4–0 | 3–2 | 4–1 | 3–1 |
| Voter | Vote | | | | | | | | | | | |
| Liz | David | Flick | Sam | Nina | Simon | Hayley | Nina | Simon | Simon | Matt | Simon | George |
| Gerry | David | Flick | Sam | Shonee | Shaun | Hayley | Nina | Nina | Simon | Nina | Shonee | George |
| Matt | David | Flick | Sam | Shonee | Shaun | Liz | Nina | Nina | Simon | Nina | Shonee (2x) | George |
| George | David | Flick | Sam | Shonee | Shaun | Hayley | Nina | Simon | Simon | Nina | Shonee | Gerry |
| Nina | ~~Shonee~~ | Matt | George | Shonee | Simon | Hayley | Gerry | Simon | None (Note: Nina and Simon were ineligible to vote in the revote.) | Matt | | |
| Simon | David | Flick | George | Shaun | Matt | George | Nina | Nina | None | | | |
| Hayley | David | Flick | Sam | Shonee | Shaun | Nina | | | | | | |
| Shaun | Liz | Matt | George | Nina | Simon | | | | | | | |
| Shonee | David | Flick | Sam | Nina | | | | | | | | |
| Sam | ~~Shonee~~ | Hayley | George | | | | | | | | | |
| Flick | ~~Shonee~~ | Matt | | | | | | | | | | |
| David | ~~Shonee~~ | | | | | | | | | | | |

Final vote
| Episode # | 24 | | |
|---|---|---|---|
| Day # | 47 | | |
| Finalist | Liz | Gerry | Matt |
| Vote | 7–0–0 | | |
| Juror | Vote | | |
| George | Liz | | |
| Nina | Liz | | |
| Simon | Liz | | |
| Hayley | Liz | | |
| Shaun | Liz | | |
| Shonee | None | | |
| Sam | Liz | | |
| Flick | Liz | | |

== Reception ==
=== Ratings ===
Ratings data is from OzTAM and represents the viewership from the 5 largest Australian metropolitan centres (Sydney, Melbourne, Brisbane, Adelaide and Perth).

| Week | Episode | Airdate | Timeslot | Overnight ratings | | Consolidated ratings | | Total ratings | | Source |
| Week | Episode | Airdate | Timeslot | Viewers | Rank | Viewers | Rank | Viewers | Rank | Source |
|---|---|---|---|---|---|---|---|---|---|---|
| 1 | 1 | 30 January 2023 | Monday 7:30 pm | 447,000 | 14 | 89,000 | 2 | 536,000 | 12 | |
| 1 | 2 | 31 January 2023 | Tuesday 7:30 pm | 410,000 | 12 | 83,000 | 2 | 493,000 | 10 | |
| 1 | 3 | 1 February 2023 | Wednesday 7:30 pm | 369,000 | 13 | 86,000 | 2 | 455,000 | 9 | |
| 2 | 4 | 5 February 2023 | Sunday 7:30 pm | 438,000 | 8 | 71,000 | 2 | 509,000 | 7 | |
| 2 | 5 | 6 February 2023 | Monday 7:30 pm | 449,000 | 13 | 92,000 | 2 | 541,000 | 11 | |
| 2 | 6 | 7 February 2023 | Tuesday 7:30 pm | 395,000 | 12 | 71,000 | 2 | 466,000 | 10 | |
| 3 | 7 | 12 February 2023 | Sunday 7:30 pm | 498,000 | 7 | 67,000 | 3 | 565,000 | 5 | |
| 3 | 8 | 13 February 2023 | Monday 7:30 pm | 469,000 | 11 | 72,000 | 3 | 541,000 | 8 | |
| 3 | 9 | 14 February 2023 | Tuesday 7:30 pm | 465,000 | 10 | 126,000 | 1 | 591,000 | 8 | |
| 4 | 10 | 19 February 2023 | Sunday 7:30 pm | 488,000 | 7 | 60,000 | 4 | 548,000 | 7 | |
| 4 | 11 | 20 February 2023 | Monday 7:30 pm | 492,000 | 9 | 60,000 | 3 | 552,000 | 9 | |
| 4 | 12 | 21 February 2023 | Tuesday 7:30 pm | 467,000 | 9 | 55,000 | 3 | 522,000 | 8 | |
| 5 | 13 | 26 February 2023 | Sunday 7:30 pm | 483,000 | 7 | 52,000 | 4 | 535,000 | 7 | |
| 5 | 14 | 27 February 2023 | Monday 7:30 pm | 474,000 | 10 | 65,000 | 3 | 539,000 | 8 | |
| 5 | 15 | 28 February 2023 | Tuesday 7:30 pm | 456,000 | 10 | 63,000 | 2 | 519,000 | 8 | |
| 6 | 16 | 5 March 2023 | Sunday 7:30 pm | 534,000 | 7 | 65,000 | 4 | 599,000 | 6 | |
| 6 | 17 | 6 March 2023 | Monday 7:30 pm | 540,000 | 8 | 51,000 | 3 | 591,000 | 8 | |
| 6 | 18 | 7 March 2023 | Tuesday 7:30 pm | 515,000 | 8 | 71,000 | 3 | 586,000 | 7 | |
| 7 | 19 | 12 March 2023 | Sunday 7:30 pm | 497,000 | 7 | 63,000 | 4 | 560,000 | 6 | |
| 7 | 20 | 13 March 2023 | Monday 7:30 pm | 536,000 | 8 | 52,000 | 4 | 588,000 | 8 | |
| 8 | 21 | 19 March 2023 | Sunday 7:30 pm | 549,000 | 5 | 57,000 | 3 | 605,000 | 4 | |
| 8 | 22 | 20 March 2023 | Monday 7:30 pm | 505,000 | 9 | 66,000 | 3 | 571,000 | 8 | |
| 9 | 23 | 26 March 2023 | Sunday 7:30 pm | 522,000 | 8 | 44,000 | 5 | 566,000 | 7 | |
| 9 | 24 (Note: The final episode was coded into two programs - the first titled "Grand Finale" and the second titled "Winner Announced". Because of this, two separate sets of ratings were produced.) | 27 March 2023 | Monday 7:30 pm | 592,000 | 8 | 52,000 | 4 | 644,000 | 9 | |
| 9 | 24 | 27 March 2023 | Monday 7:30 pm | 650,000 | 7 | 49,000 | 5 | 699,000 | 6 | |

=== Critical response ===
The seventh episode of Heroes V Villains was listed as one of the best television episodes of 2023 by The New York Times.

== Awards ==
The season won the Logie Award for Most Outstanding Reality Program at the Logie Awards of 2023.

== Controversy ==
In 2024, Jackie Glazier filed a lawsuit in the Supreme Court of Victoria against Endemol Shine Australia for the injuries that she sustained in the first Immunity Challenge due to alleged safety shortcomings.
