= Liz Parnov =

Australian pole vaulter

Elizaveta Parnov
Personal information
- Nationality: Russian-Australian
- Born: 9 May 1994 (age 32) Moscow, Russia
- Height: 178 cm (5 ft 10 in)
- Weight: 63 kg (139 lb)

Sport
- Sport: Track and field
- Event: Pole vault
- Coached by: Alex Parnov
Medal record
Women's athletics
Representing Australia
World Junior Championships
Silver medal – second place	2012 Barcelona	Pole vault
Summer Youth Olympics
Silver medal – second place	2010 Singapore	Pole vault
World Youth Championships
Silver medal – second place	2011 Lille	Pole vault
Oceania Youth Championships
Gold medal – first place	2010 Sydney	Pole vault
Silver medal – second place	2011 Sydney	Pole vault
- Updated on 18 April 2013

Elizaveta "Liz" Parnov (née Parnova born 9 May 1994 in Moscow) is a Russian-Australian athlete who competed in the pole vault at the Olympics, World Championships and Commonwealth Games. She is also the winner of Australian Survivor: Heroes V Villains.

== Early life ==
Parnov came from a family of athletes and particularly pole vaulters. She is the niece of Tatiana Grigorieva, who won the silver medal for Australia in the women's pole vault at the 2000 Summer Olympics, and the granddaughter of Natalya Pechonkina, who won the bronze medal for the USSR in the women's 400m at the 1968 Summer Olympics.

Parnov moved to Australia with her family in 1996, at the age of two. She was a competitive pole vaulter from the age of nine, where she vaulted 2.65m. She set two world age bests at 11 years (3.15m in 2005) and 12 years (3.64m in 2006). She cleared four metres just days after her 14th birthday in 2008.

== Pole vault career ==
In 2010, she competed at the first Youth Olympic Games and won silver, jumping 4.40m weeks before she turned 16 years old. She was selected to be the Australian flag bearer. Parnov then competed at the 2010 Delhi Commonwealth Games.

Parnov won a silver medal at the 2011 World Youth Championships in Athletics, held in Lille.

Her personal best of 4.50 metres, achieved on 17 February 2012 at Perth, is the Australian under-20 record, surpassing the record of her sister that she had tied in winning the Australian National Championship in 2010. While she was still age 17 at the time of the jump, which surpassed the World Youth Record, she was not eligible for the record because she turned 18 in 2012.

At the 2020 Olympic Games, her best height was 4.40m which meant that she was placed 12th in her qualifier. Parnov was eliminated from the pole vault qualifiers in controversial circumstances as officials failed to stop proceedings as rain tumbled down. She was forced to try her third attempt at 4.40m as the rain steadily increased. and in slippery, wet conditions was forced to abandon her next jump.

== After pole vaulting ==
In December 2022, Parnov announced via her Instagram that she was "excited to embark on the next chapter of my life - how lucky am I to have lived one as a pole vaulter and now I get to begin the rest of my life". Parnov is the marketing manager for the streetwear brand StreetX and studies global media and communications at Murdoch University.

In November 2022, Parnov was confirmed as a contestant on the 10th season of the reality TV show Australian Survivor, titled Heroes V Villains, which premiered in January 2023 on Network 10. Parnov ended up winning the season and the $500,000 prize.

== Personal life ==
She was coached by her father Alex Parnov, himself a former world class pole vaulter. Her older sister Vicky also competes in pole vault and is the 2012 Australian national champion.

As of 2023, Parnov is in a relationship with Daniel Bradshaw, founder of StreetX.

== Achievements ==
Year	Competition	Venue	Position	Event	Notes
Representing Australia
2010	Oceania Youth Championships	Sydney, Australia	1st	Pole vault	3.95m
2010	Youth Olympic Games	Singapore	2nd	Pole vault	4.25m
2011	Oceania Youth Championships	Sydney, Australia	2nd	Pole vault	3.85 m
2011	World Youth Championships in Athletics	Lille, France	2nd	Pole vault	4.20 m
2012	Olympic Games	London, United Kingdom	—	Pole vault	NM
2017	World Championships	London, United Kingdom	15th (q)	Pole vault	4.35 m
2018	Commonwealth Games	Gold Coast, Australia	5th	Pole vault	4.40 m
2019	World Championships	Doha, Qatar	28th (q)	Pole vault	4.35 m
2021	Olympic Games	Tokyo, Japan	24th (q)	Pole vault	4.25 m

== See also ==
- Athletics in Australia
