= Patrick Tiernan =

Australian long-distance runner (born 1994)

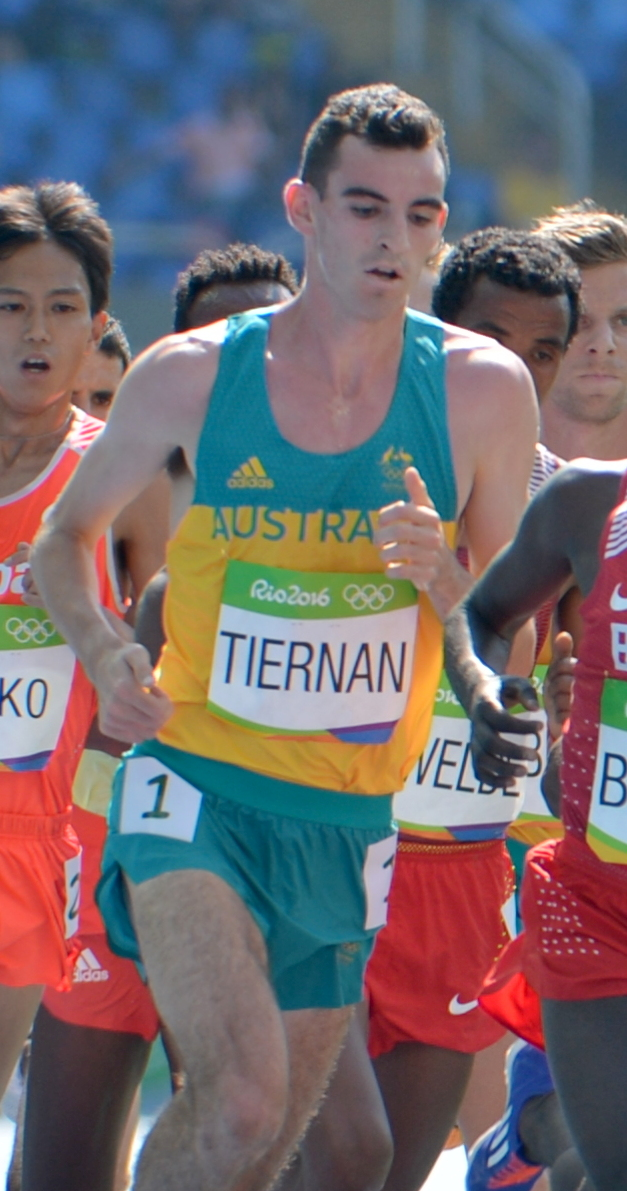
- Tiernan at the 2016 Olympics

Personal information
- Born: 11 September 1994 (age 31) Longreach, Queensland, Australia
- Height: 1.89 m (6 ft 2 in)
- Weight: 68 kg (150 lb)
- Spouse: Angel Piccirillo

Sport
- Sport: Track, long-distance running
- University team: Villanova; St Joseph's College '11
- Turned pro: Dec 2016

Achievements and titles
- Personal bests: Outdoor; 1500 m: 3:38.64 (Eugene); 3000 m: 7:37.76 (Olympic Stadium, London 2017); 5000 m: 13:12.68 (Olympic Stadium, London 2019); 10000 m: 27:22.55 (JSerra Catholic HS, San Juan Capistrano 2020); Indoor; 3000 m: 7:48.36 (New York 2019)i; 5000 m: 14:00.83 (Albuquerque 2014)i; Road; 10 Kilometres: 28:37 (Atlanta 2022); Half Marathon: 1:00:55 (Houston 2022); Marathon: 2:07:45 (Houston 2024)
Medal record
Athletics
Representing Australia
Oceania Youth Championships
Silver medal – second place	2011 Sydney	3000 m
- Updated on 14 January 2024

Patrick Tiernan (born 11 September 1994) is an Australian long-distance runner. While competing for Villanova University, he won the 2016 NCAA Division I Cross Country Championships. He has represented Australia in several global competitions, including the 2016, 2020 and 2024 Olympics. He held the Australian record in the 10000 m from 2020 to 2022. Tiernan competes professionally for Puma.

== Running career ==
=== Youth ===
Tiernan was born in Longreach, a town in Queensland, Australia. He spent his formative years in Toowoomba, also in Queensland, where he took up distance running while attending St Joseph's College, Toowoomba. In July 2012, he won the 10 kilometres race that was part of the Gold Coast Marathon.

=== College ===
==== Cross country ====
Tiernan competed for the Wildcats at Villanova University, where he earned All-American honors at each NCAA Division I Cross Country Championships in which he competed. As a freshman in 2013, Tiernan placed ninth, beating 244 other runners. He finished in eighteenth place the following year. In his junior year in 2015, Tiernan finished runner up behind University of Oregon’s Edward Cheserek. Tiernan led much of the race, before Cheserek pulled away in the final mile.

Cheserek entered the 2016 NCAA Division Cross Country Championships as favorite, having won the competition three years in a row. The race took place LaVern Gibson Cross Country Course in Terre Haute, Indiana, and it unfolded into a three-man race between Tiernan, Cheserek, and Syracuse junior Justyn Knight.

Tiernan broke away from the other competitors in the final stages of the race, becoming the first Villanova man to win the NCAA Championships since Victor Zwolak in 1963. Knight finished in second place and Cheserek third. Following his victory, the U.S. Track & Field and Cross Country Coaches Association named Tiernan its National Athlete of the Year. In reflecting on the race, LetsRun.com wrote that Tiernan "defeated arguably the most dominant runner in collegiate history in a performance that will be talked about for decades to come."

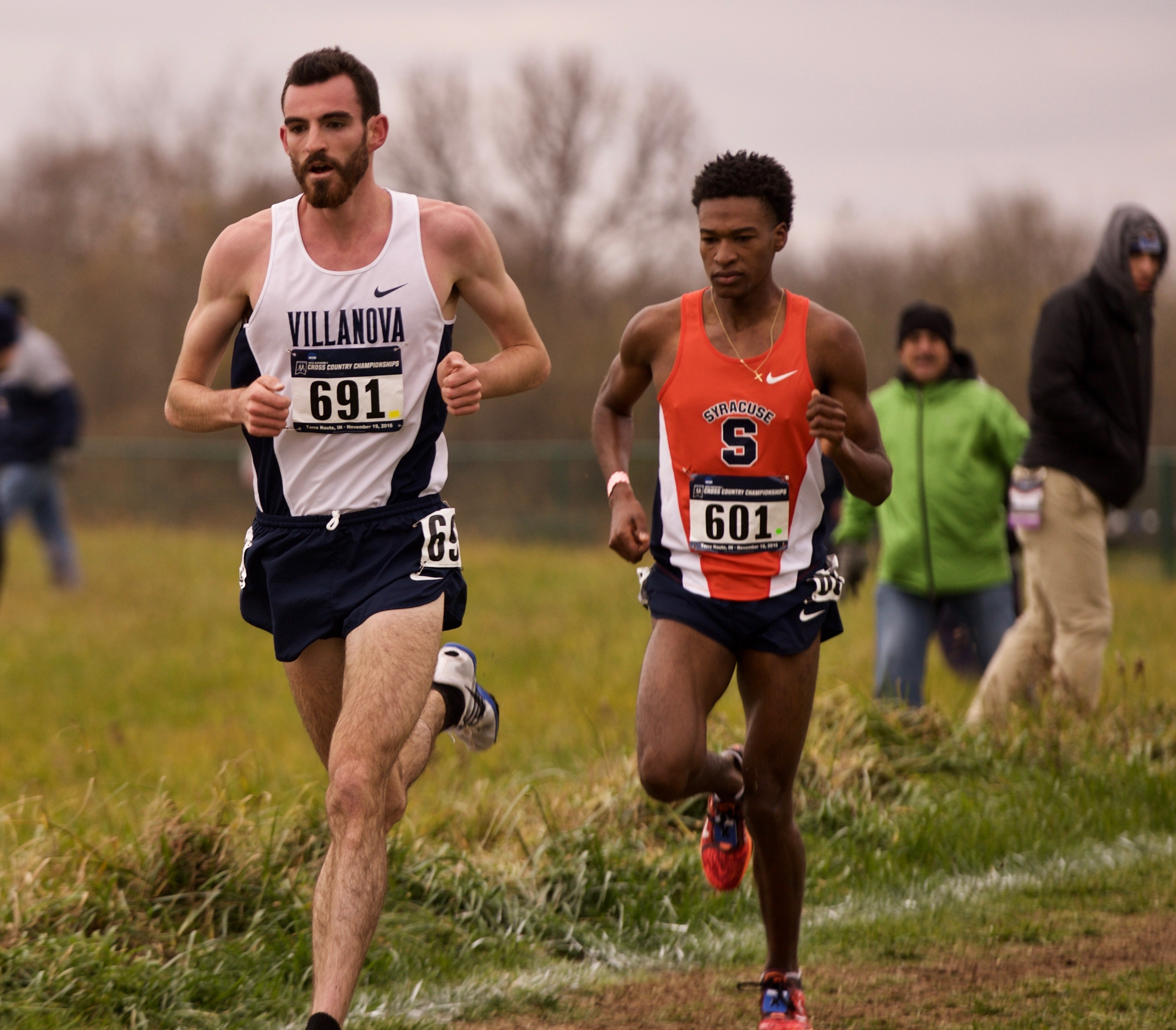
Tiernan (left) competing at the 2016 NCAA Division I Cross Country Championships.

==== Track ====
On the track, Tiernan recorded his highest finish at the 2016 NCAA Division I Outdoor Track & Field Championships finishing third in 13:27.07. Following the NCAA Championships, Tiernan continued to compete in Europe and ran 13:20.88 in the 5000 m at the Paavo Nurmi Games in Turku, Finland, on June 29. This time met the Olympic standard of 13:25.00. The following month, Tiernan was confirmed to the Olympic team for the 5000 m. At the 2016 Summer Olympics in Rio de Janeiro on August 17, Tiernan thirteenth in his heat for the 5000 m, which did not qualify him for the final.

=== Professional ===
==== 2017-19 ====
Tiernan announced that he had signed a professional sponsorship deal with Nike on 26 March 2017. The announcement came after he finished thirteenth at the 42nd IAAF World Cross Country Championships in Kampala, Uganda. The following May, he won the 10000 m of the Palo Alto Payton Jordan Invitational in a world-leading time and personal best of 27:29.81.

In August, Tiernan competed in the 2017 World Championships in Athletics. He placed last in the 10000 m. During the 5000 m, he took the lead at the 3000 m mark. He relinquished his lead shortly thereafter, eventually fading to eleventh place by the finish. Tiernan returned to compete at the 2019 World Athletics Championships. In the 5000 m, he finished in tenth place during the heats. That same year, Tiernan joined the Nike-sponsored Oregon Track Club.

==== 2020-21 ====
On 5 December 2020, Tiernan set a personal best of 27:22.55 in the 10000 m of The Track Meet in San Juan Capistrano, California. His time was an Australian record, surpassing the previous mark set by Stewart McSweyn. Tiernan's national record stood for 458 days before being surpassed by his countryman Jack Rayner on 8 March 2022.

After a hiatus due to the COVID-19 pandemic, Tiernan returned to competition in January 2021 at the Las Vegas Gold Half Marathon. He won the race in 1:02:38. Three weeks later, he dropped down in distance to compete in the mile at the Washington Invitational in Seattle, Washington, winning in 3:56.82. Tiernan competed in the 10 000 m event at the 2020 Summer Olympics on 30 July 2021. During the race, he suffered from heat exhaustion and collapsed twice. He still finished the race and afterwards required a wheelchair and medical care. Due to this episode of heat exhaustion, he withdrew from the 5000 m event at the Games.

==== 2022- present ====
In January 2022, Tiernan left the Nike Oregon Track Club to compete for Puma. Tiernan placed sixth at the Aramco Houston Half Marathon in Houston, Texas, on 16 January, clocking a time of 1:00:55. This was the second-fastest time ever recorded by an Australian in the event, with only Brett Robinson having run faster. In October 2022, he made his marathon debut at the Chicago Marathon, finishing in sixteenth place with a time of 2:11:02. Tiernan placed fourth at the 2024 Chevron Houston Marathon in 2:07:45 on the 14 January. His time was the second fastest marathon ever by an Australian and met the qualifying standard for the 2024 Summer Olympics.

== Achievements ==
=== NCAA competition ===
All results from athlete's profile on the Track & Field Results Reporting Service (TFRRS).

Year	Big East Conference Cross Country	NCAA Cross Country	Big East Conference indoor	NCAA indoor	Big East Conference Outdoor	NCAA Outdoor
2016-17	24:18.2 1st	29:22.0 1st				
2015-16	22:23.1 1st	29:11.1 2nd	5000 m 14:03.53 1st		5000 m 14:12.53 1st	5000 m 13:27.07 3rd
2015-16			3000 m 8:13.16 1st			
2014-15	23:45.8 1st	30:41.4 18th	5000 m 14:18.04 1st		5000 m 14:36.85 1st	5000 m 13:55.81 10th
2014-15			3000 m 8:18.73 2nd			
2013-14	23:51.0 1st	30:15.7 9th	5000 m 14:04.26 1st	5000 m 14:00.83 7th	5000 m 13:56.01 1st	5000 m 13:31.25 6th
2013-14			3000 m 8:10.71 2nd			

=== International competition ===
All results from athlete's profile on World Athletics.

Year	Competition	Venue	Position	Event	Notes
Representing Australia
2011	Oceania Youth Championships	Sydney, Australia	2nd	3000 m	8:33.57
2016	Olympic Games	Rio de Janeiro, Brazil	19th	5000 m	13:28.48
2017	World Cross Country Championships	Kampala, Uganda	13th	10,000 m	29:19
2017	World Championships	London, United Kingdom	11th	5000 m	13:40.01
2017	World Championships	London, United Kingdom	22nd	10,000 m	29:23.72
2018	Commonwealth Games	Gold Coast, Australia	DQ 10th	10,000 m	DQ 28:22.9
2019	World Championships	Doha, Qatar	20th (h)	5000 m	13:28.42
2021	Olympic Games	Tokyo, Japan	19th	10,000 m	28:35.06

2011: 1st, Australian Junior (U18) cross country champion
2012: 1st, Gold Coast 10km run, Gold Coast, Queensland, Australia
2012: 1st, 1500 meters (3:50.67) U20 Australian Championships
2012: 1st, 5000 meters (14:40.59) U20 Australian Championships
2012: 1st, U20 Australian Championships cross country
2016: 4th, 5000 m 13:41.37, Australian Athletics Championships Sydney Olympic Park Athletic Centre Sydney New South Wales
2016: 20th, 5000 m 13:28, Athletics at the 2016 Summer Olympics – Men's 5000 metres Brazil
2017: 13th, 10000 m 29:19, 2017 IAAF World Cross Country Championships – Senior men's race Kampala Uganda
2018: 4th, 5000 m 13:26.38 Australian Championships Gold Coast, Queensland
