= Desiree Singh =

German pole vaulter

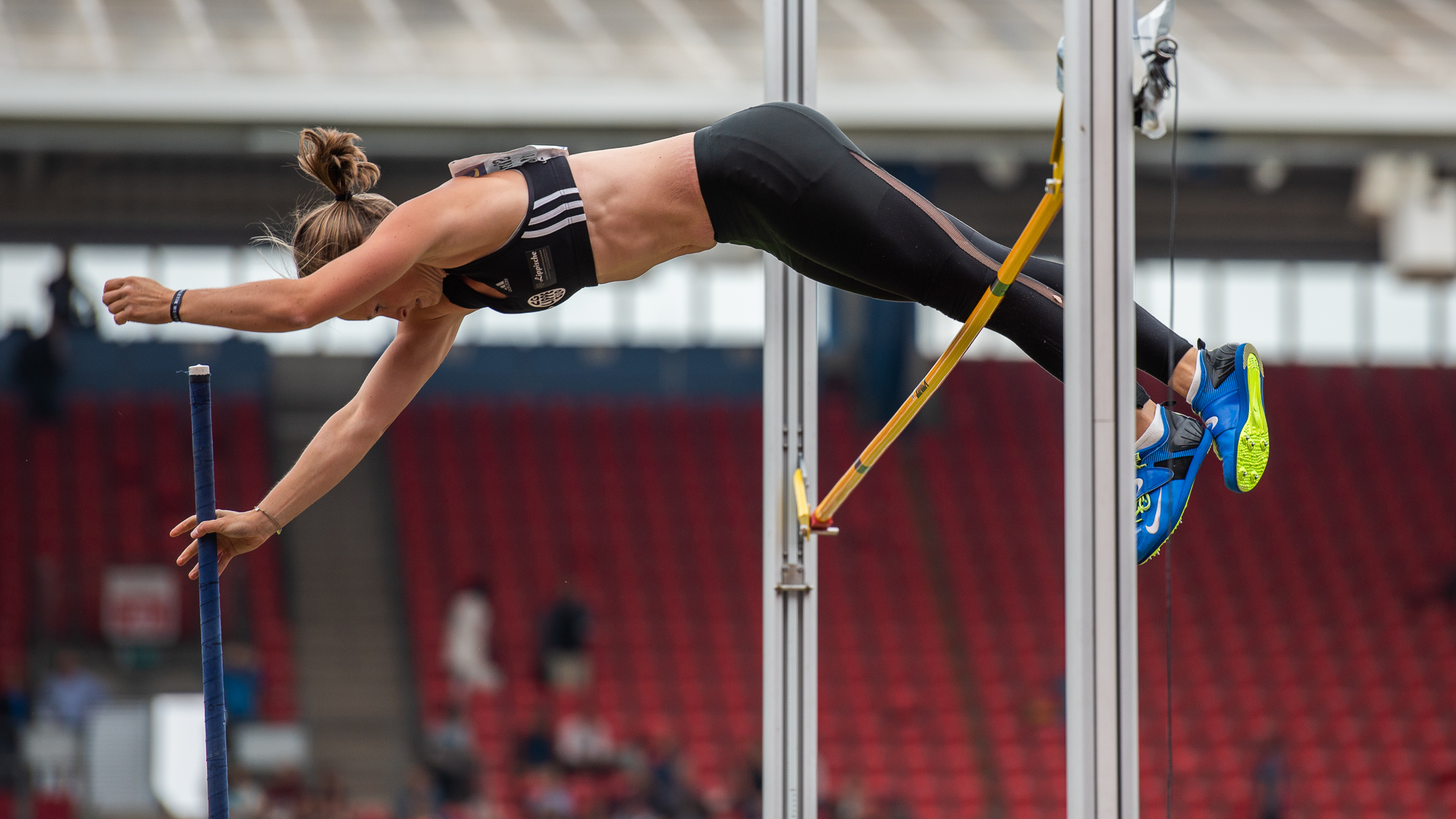
- Desiree Singh (2018)

Personal information
- Born: 17 August 1994 (age 31)

Sport
- Country: Germany
- Sport: Athletics
- Event: Pole vault

Achievements and titles
- Personal best: Pole vault: 4.40 m (2015)

Desiree Singh (born 17 August 1994) is a German female Pole vaulter, who won an individual gold medal at the Youth World Championships.
